= BYU College of Fine Arts and Communications =

Fine arts school of Brigham Young University

Coordinates: 40°15′2″N 111°39′8″W

Brigham Young University College of Fine Arts and Communications
- Type: Private coeducational
- Established: 1925
- Affiliations: The Church of Jesus Christ of Latter-day Saints
- Dean: Ed Adams
- Faculty: 141
- Undergraduates: 3,418 (2019)
- Postgraduates: 85 (2019)
- Location: Provo, Utah, USA
- Campus: Suburban, 560 acres (2.3 km^{2})
- Website: http://cfac.byu.edu

The Brigham Young University (BYU) College of Fine Arts and Communications (CFAC) is one of the nine colleges at the university, a private institution operated by the Church of Jesus Christ of Latter-day Saints (LDS Church) and located in Provo, Utah. Founded in 1925, the college has grown from a small college of the arts with minimal faculty and only 100 students to the second largest college on campus.

With more than 3,400 students and 141 full-time faculty, the expansive college has spread across the university's campus and occupies 11 buildings (including the Music Building, West Campus Central Building, George H. Brimhall Building, Jesse Knight Building, Stephen L. Richards Building, B66, and the BYU Museum of Art).

With four departments (Dance, Theatre and Media Arts, Art, Design) and two schools (Communications, Music), the CFAC offers 14 undergraduate degrees (with 38 emphases) and eight graduate degrees.

Since 1971, BYU performing arts groups have performed more than 14,000 shows in all 50 states and more than 100 countries of the world. Worldwide audiences totaling more than 12 million people, have also included radio and TV broadcasts reaching billions.

== History ==
With BYU owned and operated by the LDS Church, the CFAC has close ties to the church's religious history and its members' passion for the arts. As Mormon pioneers crossed the plains in the efforts to reach the Great Salt Lake Valley, many pioneer men and women renewed themselves through music and dancing. Following their arrival in the valley, church leaders established several different communities, and the arts were central to the settlements they erected and were equally important to the pioneers' individual lives.

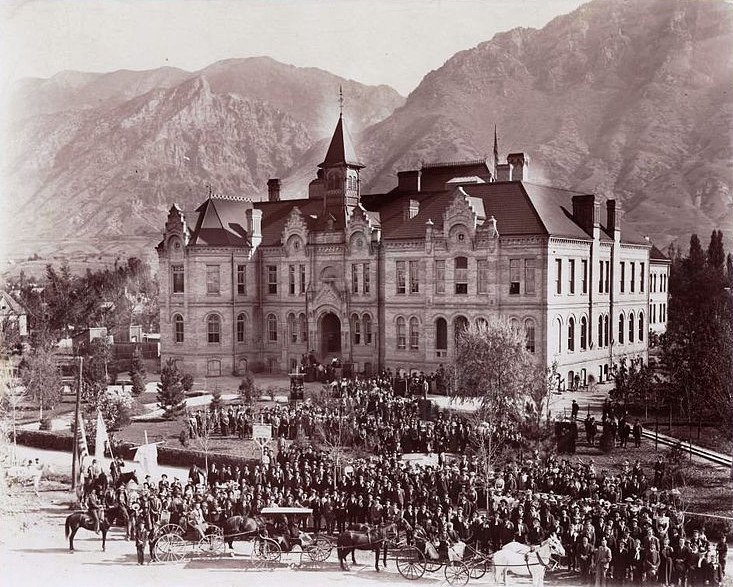
Brigham Young Academy

Brigham Young Academy was organized in 1875 and shortly after its establishment, a choir was organized to sing at events and religious services. By 1883 the Department of Music was organized as an extracurricular body and by the early 1900s the Academy had a band, orchestra, and choir; music was being integrated into the school's core curriculum and departments of art and speech were both organized. In 1925, under the direction of BYU president Franklin Stewart Harris, the College of Fine Arts was organized with Gerrit de Jong as its first dean. The new college became the first fine arts college in the western United States and brought together the pre-existing departments of music, art and dramatic arts and speech.

The music department was initially composed of a vocal and instrumental division. At the time the college was created, the department had limited full-time faculty (Robert Sauer, Franklin Madsen, Florence Jepperson Madsen. and Margaret Summerhays). Each of these faculty members was responsible for conducting all the classes for the department and the school's group ensembles. The art department consisted of Bent Franklin Larsen and Elbert Hindley Eastmond. Within the next decade the faculty gained the skills of Verla L. Birrell, Lynn Taylor, and J. Roman Andrus. The department not only managed the instruction of the arts, but also began a standing collection of art pieces to be housed at the university. By the end of Franklin's administration, the department had accumulated roughly 700 pieces on behalf of the university. The department of public speaking and dramatic arts was originally headed by T. Earl Pardoe.

The organization of the college was a major accomplishment for the arts at BYU but the programs lacked a central building. Musicians in need of practice space would often congregate in bathrooms. Rehearsals for plays and productions were held in the Joseph Smith Building in shifts (one in the afternoon, one in the evening, and one starting around midnight). Musical productions struggled to overcome the poor acoustics and lighting in the Smith Fieldhouse however, despite the many space issues, the programs were academically strong and continually succeeded. After attending several rehearsals the 1956 University Accreditation Team reported the arts instruction to be of superior quality and the college began its path to national and international recognition.

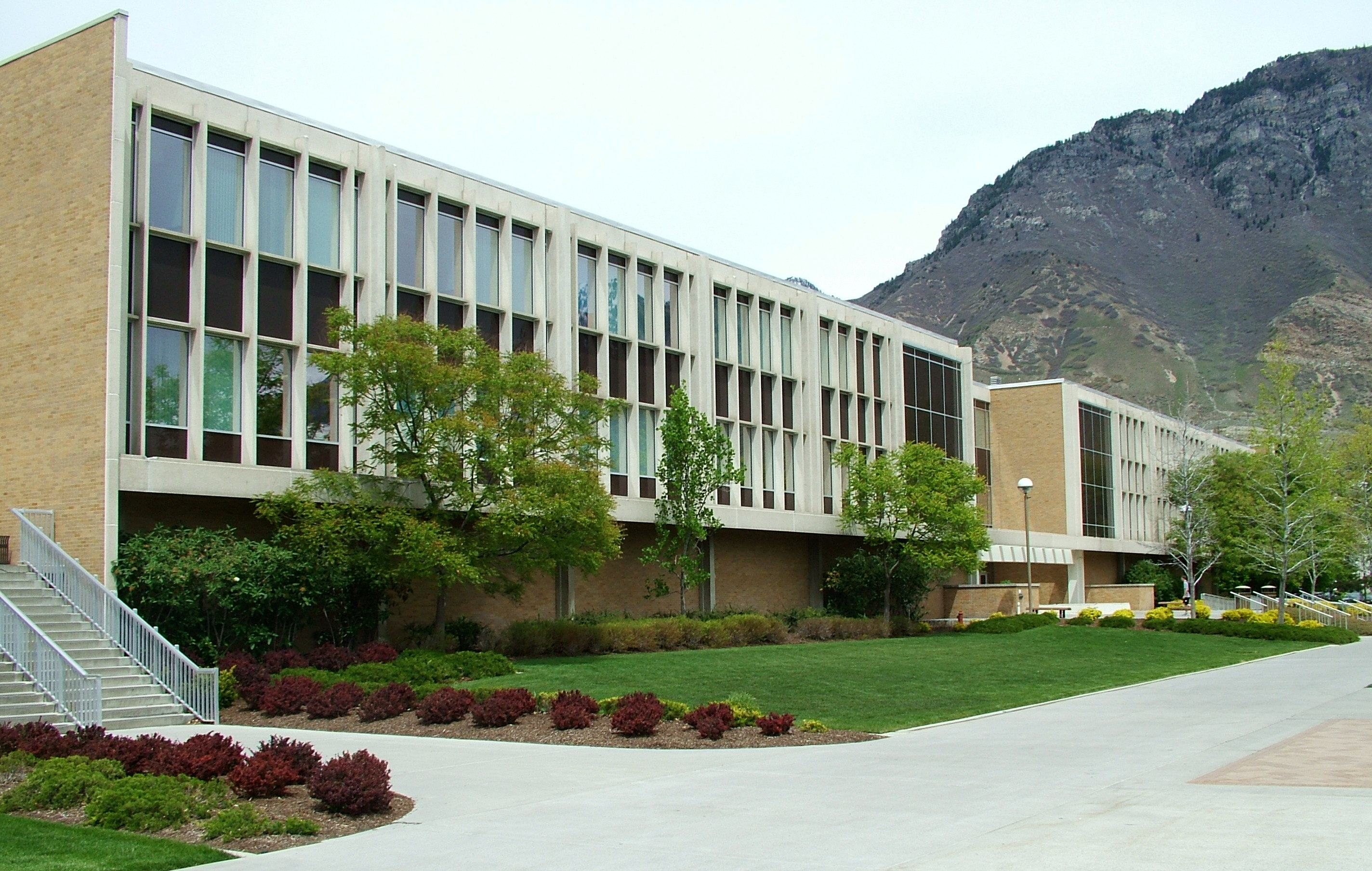
Franklin S. Harris Fine Arts Center (HFAC), at the heart of BYU's Provo, Utah, campus

In the 1958, the university allotted a portion of its budget to construct a fine arts center. The building was projected to cost $5 million, 80 percent of which came directly from the LDS Church. Internationally acclaimed architect William L. Pereira was hired to design the building and construction on the Franklin S. Harris Fine Arts Center (HFAC) began in 1962. It was completed in 1964 at a cost of $7 million making it the most expensive building on campus at the time. While the HFAC was under construction, another major change was made to the college – the university's administration approved the addition of a Department of Communications to the growing college.

The department's addition to the college officially changed its name to the College of Fine Arts and Communications. The new department adopted the former Department of Journalism (formerly housed in the College of Humanities and Social Sciences), the broadcasting program (formerly housed in the Department of Dramatic Arts and the photography program (formerly housed in the Department of Visual Arts. Responding to a request from the university's administration, the college piloted an academic advisement program. In 1973, the College Advisement Center opened its doors. It was the first center of its kind on campus, offering one-on-one consultations to students regarding their class schedules and graduation plans. The pilot program was successful and the College of Fine Arts and Communications Advisement Center became the model for similar centers started across campus.

From 1968 to 1974 the Department of Theatre operated the BYU Touring Repertory Theatre. The program was set up like professional repertory theaters with actors learning multiple parts for multiple productions. The program toured regularly and had a total of approximately 200,000 spectators.

In 2003, the BYU Adlab was created and has won numerous student advertising awards. The college continued to undergo numerous changes and transitions over the years, but the most significant change occurred in 2009 when university added the Department of Dance (The department had previously been housed in the former College of Health and Human Performance prior to its dissolution in the summer of 2009.).

In 2022, as the new Music Building neared completion and the HFAC began preparations for demolition, the departments of Art, Design, and Theatre and Media Arts, as well as administrative offices, moved into the West Campus Buildings, a mix of repurposed and new buildings on the site of the former Provo High School. In early 2023, the Music Building opened for use and the HFAC was demolished.

== Campus ==
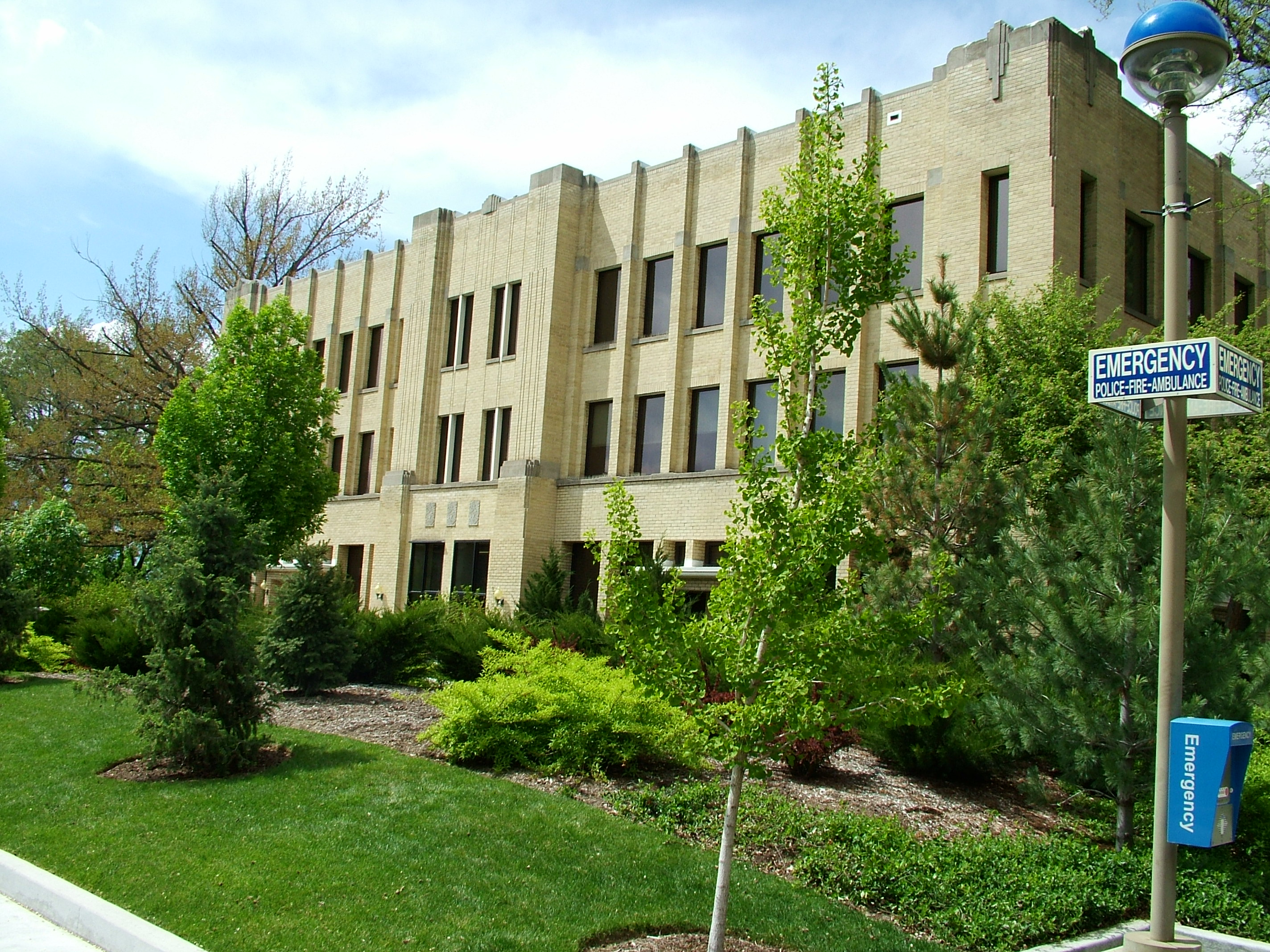
The George H. Brimhall Building, home of the Department of Communications, is located on the south end of the Provo, Utah, Campus

BYU is located in Provo, Utah, approximately 45 minutes from Utah's capital, Salt Lake City.

As of 2023, the college is principally housed in the West Campus Central Building, with administrative offices found in the nearby West Campus Office Building.

The HFAC, the college’s previous core building, was demolished in 2023 to make way for the construction of a new fine arts building on the same location in the center of BYU's campus.

The George H. Brimhall Building was built in 1918 and is located in the southwestern corner of campus and houses the School of Communications. Recently renovated in 2005, the building previously served as the Student Army Training Corps, blacksmithing and wood working facility, mechanics' garage, storage, and eventually journalism and art classes.

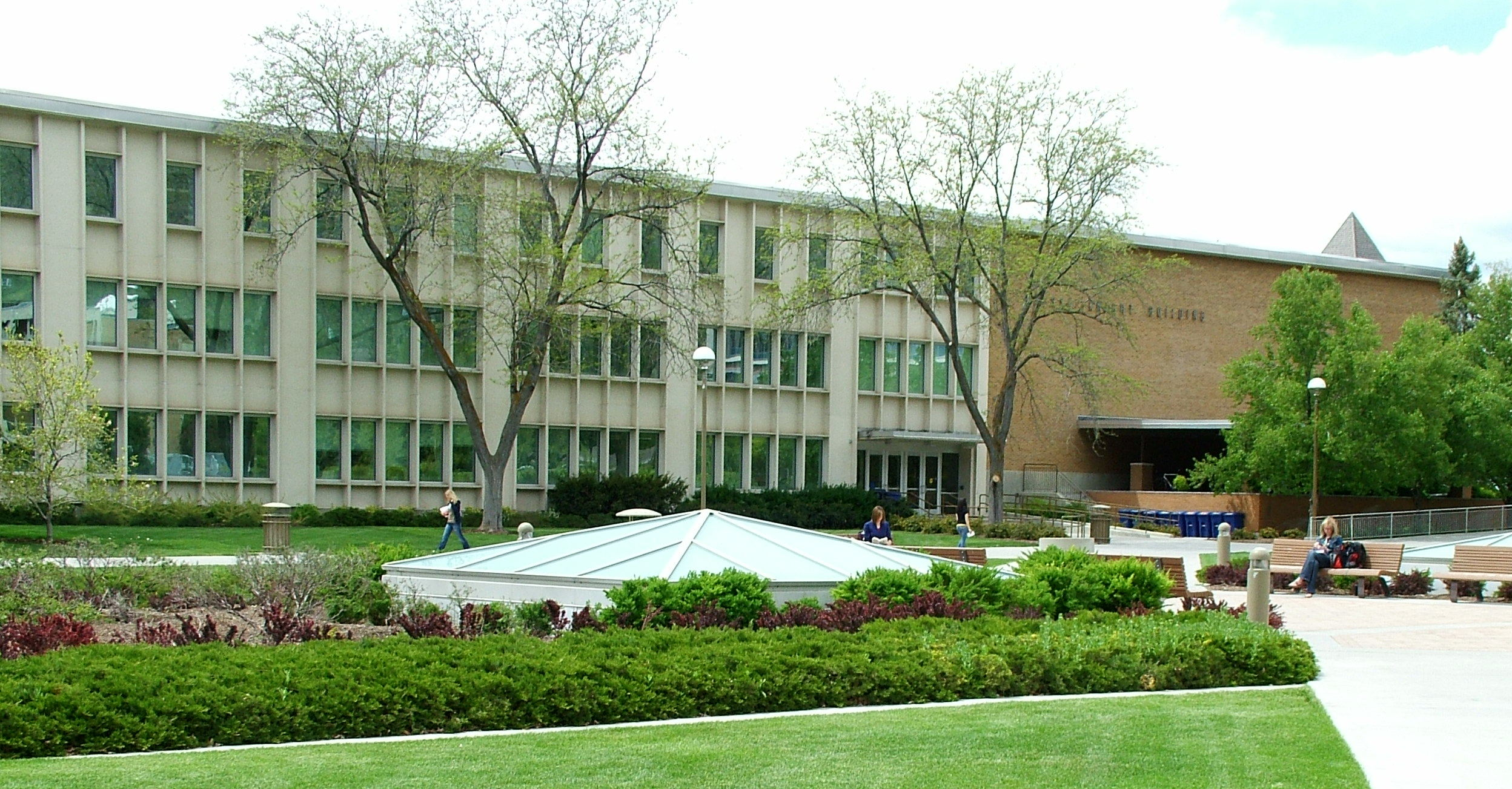
The Jessie Knight Building is the former home of the College of Humanities and is now a multi-use building on the north end of campus that is home to Art History and Education courses.

As of 2023, the building hosts the Advanced Advertising Lab (BYU Adlab), Bradley Public Relations (BYU's nationally affiliated, student-run firm), ElevenNEWS (daily, student produced broadcast that airs on BYU Television), The Universe (student-produced campus newspaper with an approximate readership of 18,000) the Eye Tracking Lab, as well as three floors of classrooms, computer labs, graduate study rooms, student organization offices, conference rooms, and faculty and administrative offices.

Jesse Knight Building (JKB) was built in 1960 and was first occupied by the BYU Commercial College (or business school). After the Tanner Building was built, the JKB became the location of the College of Humanities. However, with the completion of the new Joseph F. Smith building in 2005, most humanities functions were shifted to the new facility and other institutions moved into the building. As of 2023, the JKB is the home of the BYU Police, Freshman Academy administration, Human Resource Development, the Department of Art, the English Writing Center, the Humanities Publications Center, School of Management computer laboratories, and many classrooms.

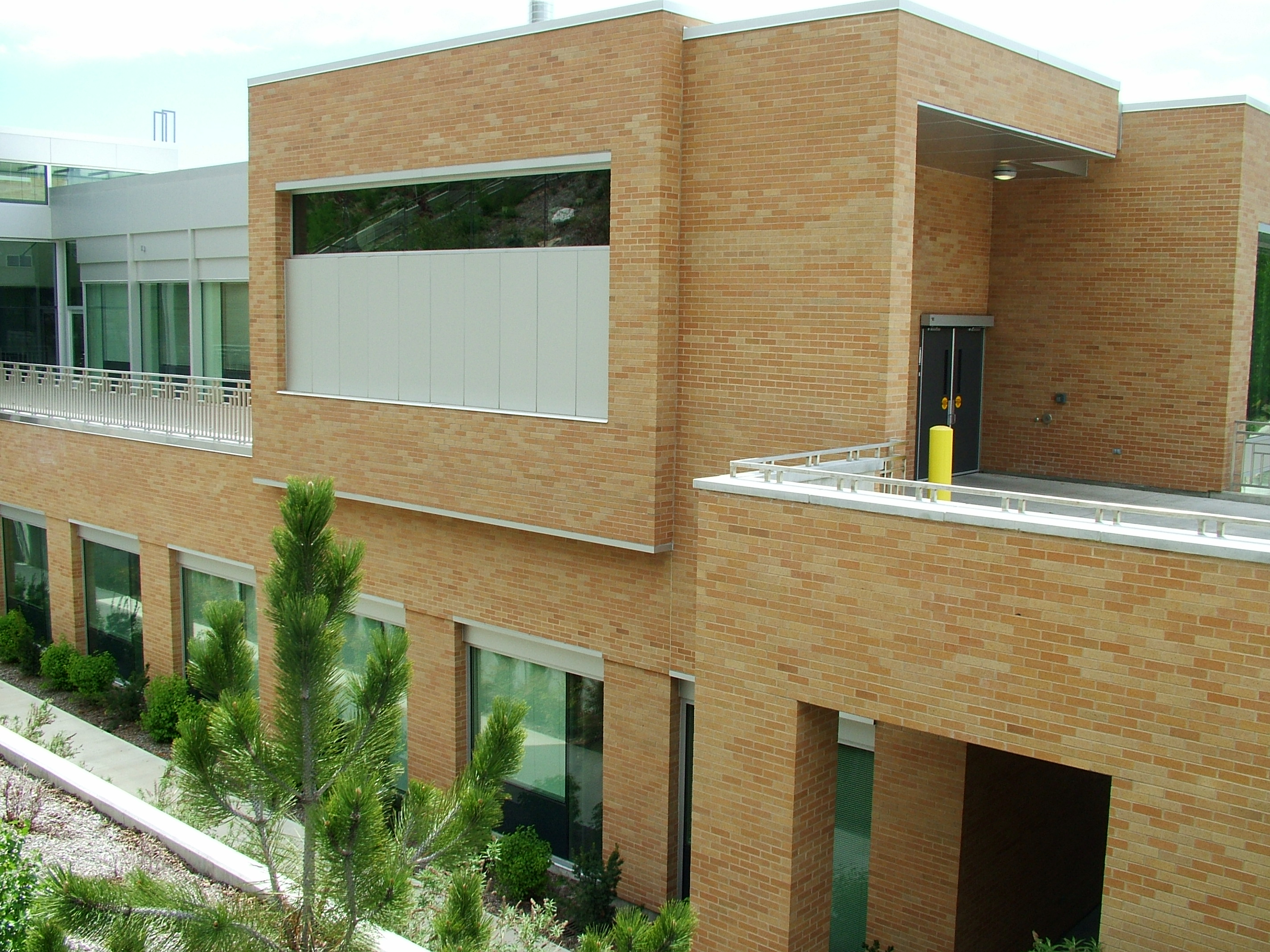
Stephen L. Richards building, home to many of the university's athletic events and the college's Department of Dance

The Stephen L. Richards Building, built in 1971, was named for Stephen L. Richards, a proponent of physical education and good sportsmanship. Richards also served on the BYU Board of Trustees, as assistant commissioner of church education and as a counselor in the LDS Church's First Presidency. The facility includes three Olympic-size heated swimming pools, numerous dance studios, administrative offices, basketball, volleyball, and racquetball courts, locker rooms, and classrooms. The facility also houses the CFAC's Department of Dance and portions of the School of Music.

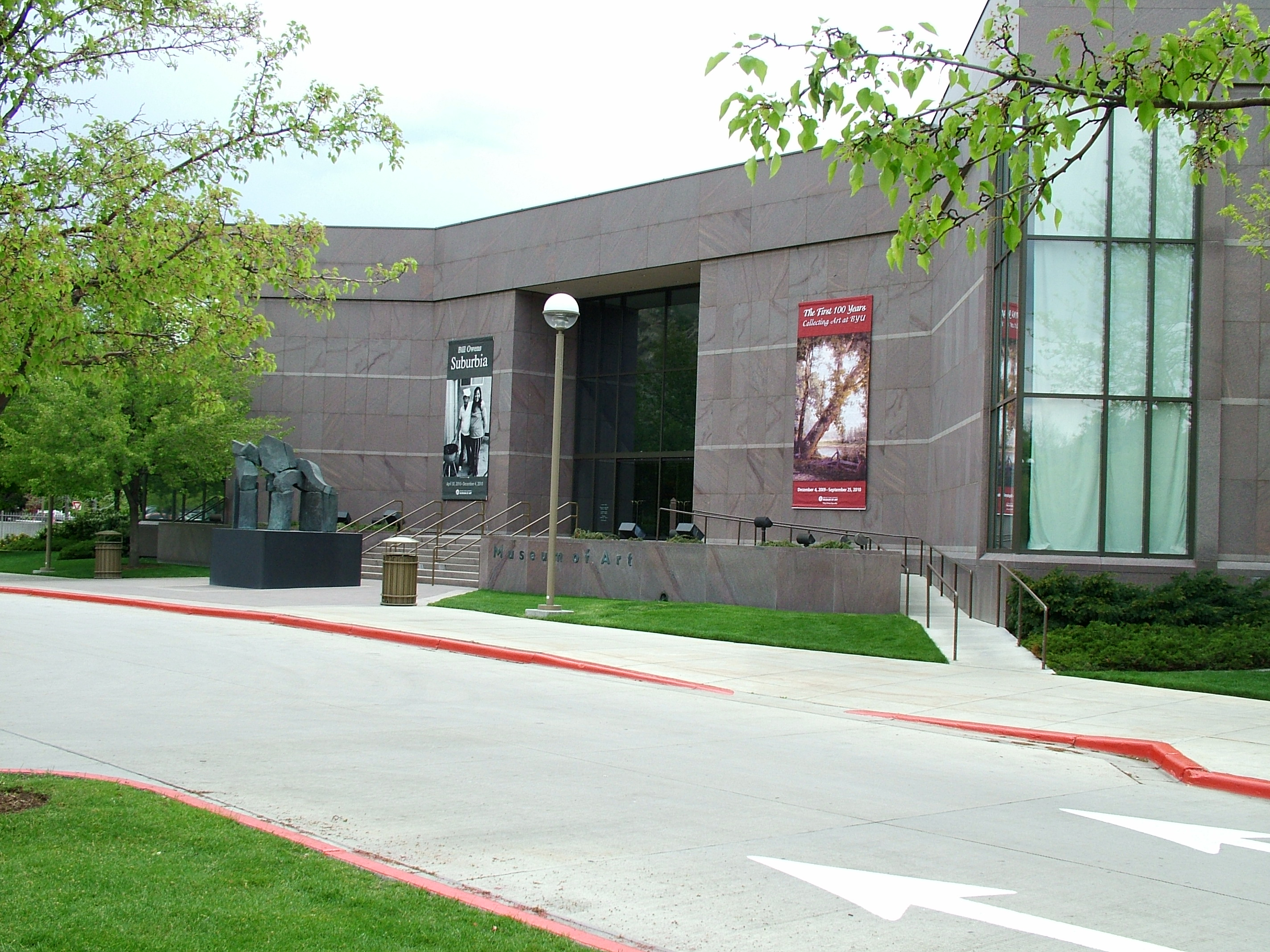
BYU's renowned Museum of Art is located on north end of the Provo, Utah, Campus

B66 is an industrial-style building that houses some classrooms and the Department of Visual Arts' ceramic studios.

The BYU Museum of Art (MOA) is one of the best attended university-campus art museums in the United States. The museum, which had been discussed for more than fifty years, opened in a 10,000-square-foot (930 m2) space in 1993. According to a 2004 survey, the museum ranked first in attendance among university campus art museums with 334,774 visitors. Among all art museums, the museum comes in 31st in attendance out of 157 member art museums from the United States, Canada and Mexico.

The museum displays paintings, drawings, prints, sculptures, installations, video, and photography. The permanent collection contains works of art from many renowned artists including Carl Bloch, Maynard Dixon, Rembrandt, Norman Rockwell, Earl W. Bascom and Minerva Teichert. The MOA also houses a café, gift shop, and a small theatre.

The Music Building (MB), which opened in 2023, is the home of the School of Music. The 170,000-square-foot building has a main concert hall, a recital hall, and various smaller rooms specifically tailored for groups such as digital music production and opera performance.

== Departments and schools ==
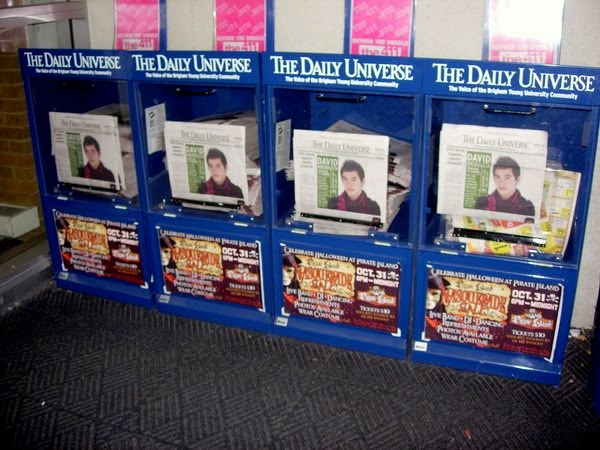
BYU's daily newspaper, The Universe, is produced by the School of Communications

=== Art ===
The department offers Bachelor of Art degrees in Art and Art Education, and a Bachelor of Fine Arts in Art. The department also offers graduate degrees in Studio Arts and Art Education. Notable alumni include Janis Mars Wunderlich, Miranda Meeks, Kathleen Peterson, and Paige Crosland Anderson.

=== Communications ===
The Department of Communications was established in 1933, and accredited in 1984. In February 2015, it achieved school status and became The School of Communications. It is currently housed in the Brimhall building, located on the south end of BYU campus. The school offers a bachelor's degree in communications, with various emphases, including Advertising, News Media and Public Relations. The school also offers a master's degree in communications. The school includes various student organizations, such as the American Advertising Foundation (AAF), the Public Relations Student Society of America (PRSSA), and the Society of Professional Journalists (SPJ) to help students prepare for the professional chapters. The BYU Adlab, Bradley Public Relations Agency, The Universe, and ElevenNEWS are also accommodated in the school and building.

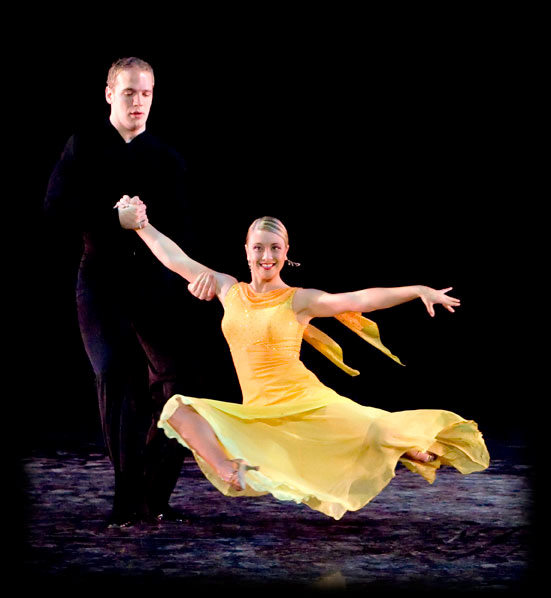
Members of one of BYU's competitive dance teams

=== Dance ===
The Department of Dance joined the CFAC on June 1, 2009 after the dissolution of the College of Health and Human Performance bringing all of the arts at BYU under one administrative umbrella.

The Department of Dance provides an extensive academic dance program . More than 13,000 students take classes every year in one or more of the department's four areas of emphasis: ballet, ballroom, modern dance, and world dance. The department also has offerings in tap, jazz, and aerobic dance.

See also BYU Ballroom Dance Company.

=== Design ===
The Department of Design prepares students in the following areas of study: Animation, Art Direction, Branding, Character Design, Concept Design, Fine Art Photography, Game Development, Graphic Design, Illustration, Interaction Design, Motion Design, Photography, Videography and Visual Development.

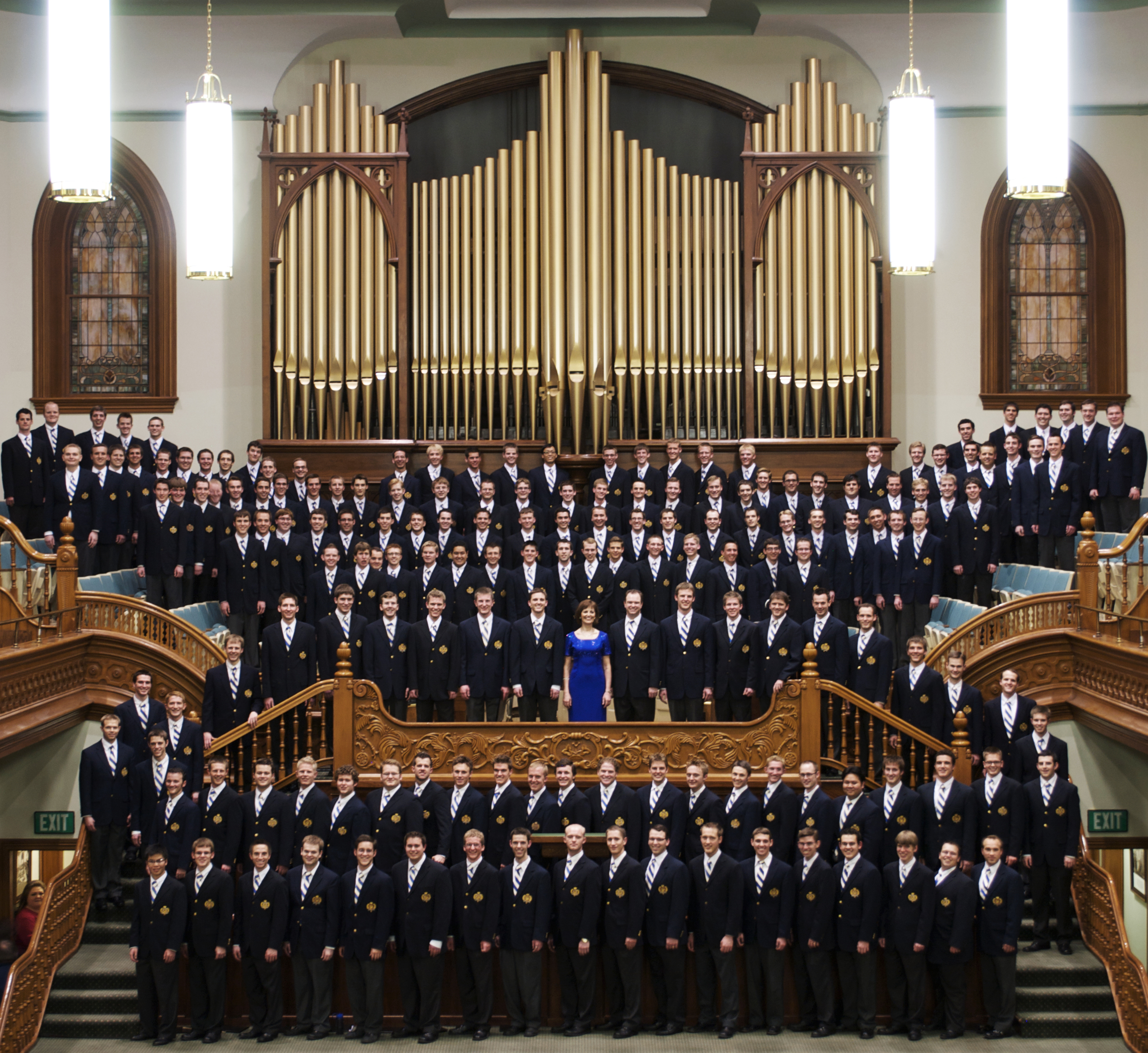
Members of BYU's Men's Chorus under the direction of Rosalind Hall

=== Music ===
The school is home to audition choirs, bands, and orchestras.

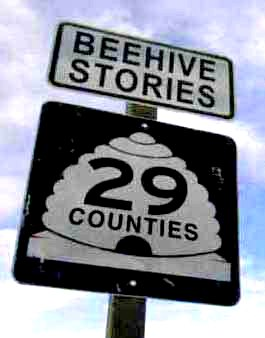
One of the Department of Theatre and Media Arts' ongoing projects is a series of mini documentaries on each of Utah's counties, called "Beehive Stories".

The School of Music also runs the New Horizons Orchestra, a program for adults 40 years old and above to teach playing of string instruments.

BYU's Opera Workshop is run by the School of Music. The Opera Workshop was begun in 1947 under the direction of Dol L. Earl. Earl directed the Opera Workshop until 1963, when he was succeeded by Brandt Curtis. Clayne Robison became the director of the opera workshop in 1973.

BYU has had an orchestra since at least 1925. It was at that time that Leroy Robertson became the director of the BYU Symphonic Orchestra. He served in that position until 1946 when he was succeeded by Lawrence Sardoni. In 1951, Sardoni inaugurated a touring program for the orchestra. From 1964 until 1966 Crawford Gates was the conductor of the orchestra. He was succeeded in 1966 by Ralph G. Laycock. Under Laycock's leadership the orchestra was renamed the Brigham Young University Philharmonic Orchestra, its current name.

Currently, Kory Katseanes holds the title of Director of Orchestras within the School of music. He directs both the 98-member Philharmonic Orchestra and the 47-member chamber orchestra, all of whose members are also in the Philharmonic Orchestra. There is also a Symphony Orchestra which functions as the preparatory orchestra for the Philharmonic Orchestra. There are also two non-audition orchestras that are open to any student enrolled at BYU.

See also BYU bands and ensembles, BYU Young Ambassadors and BYU choirs.

=== Theatre and Media Arts ===
The college's theatre program is designed to educate students in basic foundations of dramatic literature, theatre history, theory, and performance skills as both an actor and director while providing new, innovative techniques in all areas of theatre design technology and production. The College also supervises the BYU Center for Animation.

BYU's theatre students have performed in Broadway casts of Mamma Mia!, Les Misérables, Miss Saigon, Thoroughly Modern Millie, Hair, and 42nd Street. Additionally, students have been with the Broadway national tours of Cats, Fosse, Footloose, Titanic, Sunset Boulevard, and Annie Get Your Gun. Graduates have also worked with the Boston Ballet, Milwaukee Repertory Theater, and the Sacramento Ballet.

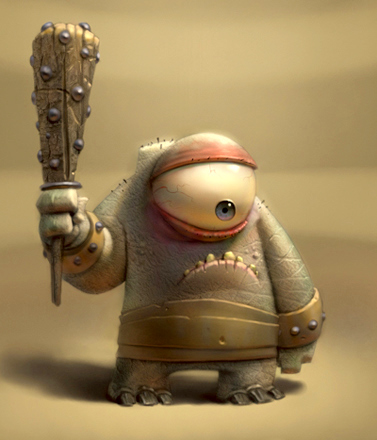
One of the monsters from BYU Animation's short film, "Pajama Gladiator"

Film students from the department have created several successful independent films (Napoleon Dynamite, God's Army, Saints and Soldiers, The Singles Ward, Out of Step, Brigham City, and Charly). Many students have competed in film competitions including the Sundance Film Festival and Slamdance. Students have also worked on the crews for national television programs (Touched by an Angel and Everwood).
