= Kathleen Peterson =

Kathleen Peterson may refer to:

- Kathleen Peterson (murder victim)
- Kathleen Peterson (artist)
