= Brigham Young University Museum of Art =

BYU Museum of Art
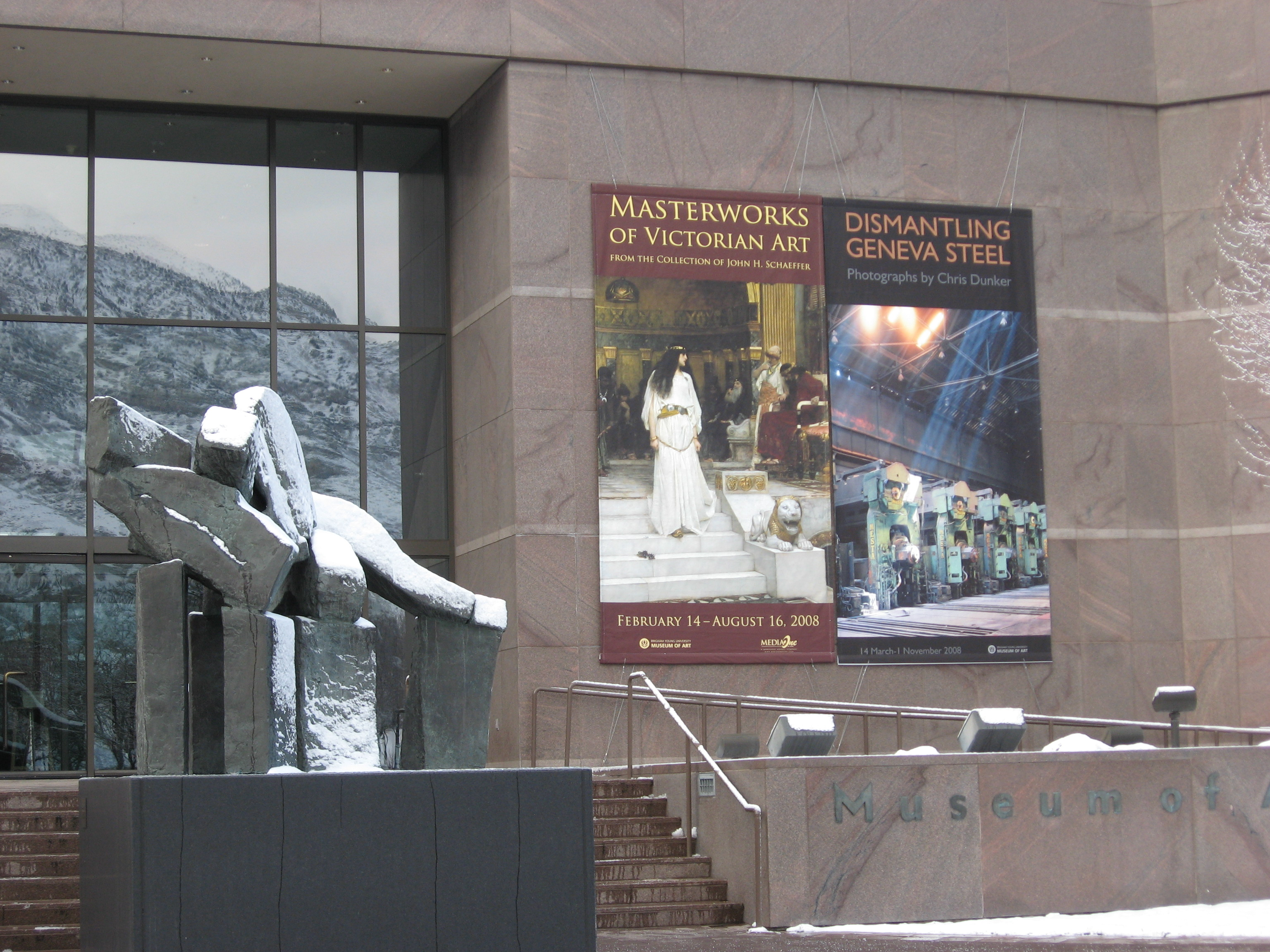
- Established: 1993
- Location: Brigham Young University, Provo, Utah, United States
- Coordinates: 40°15′03″N 111°38′53″W
- Type: University museum
- Visitors: 334,774
- Website: moa.byu.edu

The Brigham Young University Museum of Art, located in Provo, Utah, United States is the university's primary art museum and is one of the best attended university-campus art museums in the United States. The museum, which had been discussed for more than fifty years, opened in a 10,000-square-foot (930 m^{2}) space in October 1993 with a large exhibit on the Etruscans. The museum is an integral part of the BYU College of Fine Arts and Communications and provides opportunities for students across the college and the university's campus.

== History ==
In 1960 or 1959, Brigham Young University received a donation of Mahonri Young's art collection, which included over 10,000 works of art. Before the museum was created, artwork was stored in the Harris Fine Arts Center. Lacking a museum, the university allowed professors into storage rooms to select art to decorate their offices, even though some of the paintings were very valuable. One art professor, Wesley M. Burnside, recognized the value of the collection and as a curator, started to sell, trade, and purchase pieces, eventually becoming the collection's acquisitions director, though his role was supposed to be limited to making recommendations to the faculty committee. Several art dealers recognized Burnside's inexperience in art dealing and took advantage of his naivete and lack of record keeping to make unfair trades or outright steal works. When Burnside retired in 1984, the new dean of the art department, James Mason, ordered an audit and found that more than 900 artworks were stolen, missing, or sold without authorization, at a loss of almost 4 million dollars.

After breaking ground two years prior, the museum opened in October 1993 as a location to house BYU's extensive collection of more than 17,000 pieces of art which, due to a lack of space, had never been able to be displayed permanently.

According to a 2004 survey, the museum ranked first in attendance among university campus art museums with 334,774 visitors. Among all art museums, the museum comes in 31st in attendance out of 157 member art museums from the United States, Canada and Mexico. The museum's philosophy of reaching out to the students and the community has been cited as one of the reasons for its success to date. In addition to having the largest university museum attendance, the museum also has the highest level of student attendance because its staff works closely with faculty to incorporate the museum into school curriculum.

In 1997, a Rodin exhibit that would have included 4 nude works of art was modified. The exclusion of those four pieces surprised museum professionals and angered some students.

== Collection ==
The museum displays paintings, drawings, prints, sculptures, installations, video, and photography. The permanent collection contains works of art from many renowned artists including Carl Bloch, Maynard Dixon, Rembrandt, Norman Rockwell, John Singer Sargent, and Minerva Teichert. The museum's permanent collection is augmented by a number of partnerships with other organizations and traveling exhibits and other special exhibits, including one that coincided with the 2002 Winter Olympics that were held in nearby Salt Lake City. The museum's collection includes more than 170 works related to Jesus Christ showing how his portrayal has changed.

== See also ==
- Mormon art
