= Cougar Marching Band =

Cougar Marching Band may refer to multiple university marching bands including:

- BYU Cougar Marching Band, also known as the "Power of the Wasatch"
- Spirit of Houston, the University of Houston Marching Band
- Washington State University Cougar Marching Band
