= Del Parson =

American painter

- Born: 1948 (age 77–78); Ogden, Utah, U.S.
- Notable work: Christ in Red Robe (1983)

Delwin Oliver Parson (born 1948) is an American painter who is well known for his Latter-day Saint-themed paintings. His painting of Jesus, "Christ in Red Robe," is recognizable from its wide use by the Church of Jesus Christ of Latter-day Saints (LDS Church).

== Biography ==
Parson was born in Ogden, Utah and grew up in Rexburg, Idaho, where his father was an art professor at Ricks College. He is one of nine children, three of whom became professional artists.

Parson attended Ricks College and later Brigham Young University (BYU), where he received a B.A. in Life Sciences in 1972 and a Master of Fine Arts in drawing and painting in 1975. Parson was a gallery and portrait artist before becoming a professor of art at Dixie College in 1988. There he was awarded the Teaching Excellence Award from the Utah College Council in 1990.

After the death of his wife, Joycel, and oldest daughter in a 1978 car accident, Parson felt inspired to begin painting primarily religious subjects.

In 1983, he was commissioned by the LDS Church to paint "Christ in Red Robe," his first portrait of Jesus, which has since been used in many church materials. This portrait is the subject of popular Mormon folklore, with claims that Parson produced the work under the direction of church general authorities, who suggested how to make it more accurate, until it was deemed the closest resemblance of Jesus Christ. Parson denies this, stating the work's commission and revisions were according to the needs of the church curriculum department.

In April 2011, the biographical film "Del Parson: Portraits of Love" premiered on BYUtv.

Parson lives in Cedar City, Utah with his wife, Lynette, and has six children.

== Artistic work ==
Parson is a traditional realist artist and creates mostly Latter-day Saint art, but also works on other themes, such as landscapes. The LDS Church has commissioned Parson to paint over 240 works, many of which are of Jesus Christ. One painting in particular, of the resurrected Christ exiting the tomb, is found in many the church's meetinghouses and homes of its members.

Parson has received regional and national awards for his work. His work has been displayed at the Allied Artists of America, National Academy of Design, Knickerbocker Artist, American Artists Professional League, the Amarillo Rotary Show, the Springville Museum of Art, the Morrison-Knudsen corporate headquarters, the Church History Museum, and the National Center for Constitutional Studies. His work has been the sole subject of exhibits at Dixie State University, BYU, BYU–Idaho, the Las Vegas Art Museum, and the James M. Haney Art Gallery in Amarillo, Texas.

== See also ==
- Mormon art
