= Kyle Andrews =

American singer

- Born: May 22, 1982 (age 44); Chicago, Illinois, U.S.
- Genre: Indie rock
- Occupation: Recording Artist
- Instruments: Vocals, guitar, piano
- Years active: 2006–present
- Labels: Badman Recording Co., Elephant Lady Records, Stay U
- Website: http://www.kyleandrews.com

Kyle Andrews is an American indie rock songwriter and performer born in Chicago and based in Nashville, Tennessee.

== Career ==
Andrews has released albums on Portland's Badman Recording Co. as well as his own Elephant Lady Records imprint.

His 2010 song "You Always Make Me Smile" (co-written with friend Neil Mason) was featured in a worldwide Holiday Inn ad. Andrews worked with students from the BYU AdLab and ad agency McCann Erickson to concept a music video for the song. The resulting music video was filmed in Provo, Utah, featuring Andrews singing in the middle of an attempt to break the Guinness World Record for the largest water balloon fight with 3927 participants and 120,021 water balloons. The video went viral.

His interactive video for "Sushi" (directed by Dennis Liu) was made from 1.4 million tiles, and thousands of unique YouTube video stills. In 2010 it was shortlisted for the Guggenheim's YouTube Play Exhibit.

His music has been used in other TV shows and commercials, including a worldwide television ad for Dell ("We Were Colors") and a national television ad for Doritos ("Bombs Away"). "You Always Make Me Smile" also appeared in an episode of ABC's Grey's Anatomy.

Although Kyle performs as a first-name/last-name artist, and self-recorded the majority of his discography, he plays live with a full band.

Andrews' fifth album, Robot Learn Love, was released August 16, 2011.

== Discography ==
- 2006 – Amos In Ohio
- 2007 – Find Love, Let Go
- 2008 – Real Blasty
- 2010 – Kangaroo EP
- 2010 – Bombs Away / We Were Colors (digital-only single)
- 2011 – Robot Learn Love
- 2013 – Brighter Than The Sun
- 2016 – Escape
- 2018 – Big Hearts Exploding
