= The Universe (student newspaper) =

Student newspaper of Brigham Young University

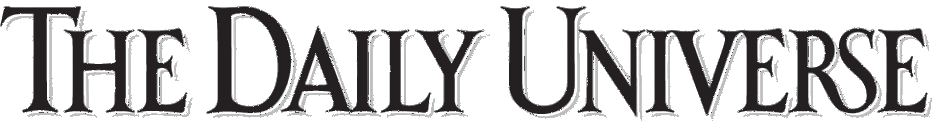
- Type: Online daily student newspaper
- Format: Digital
- Owner: Brigham Young University
- Founded: 1956; 70 years ago
- Language: English
- Headquarters: 770 E University Pkwy, Provo, Utah 84604
- Circulation: 18,500
- Website: The Digital Universe

The Universe (formerly The Daily Universe) is the official student newspaper for Brigham Young University (BYU) and was started in 1956.

== History ==
BYU's student-published newspaper was first titled White and Blue (1898–1921), later becoming the Y News (1921–1948). In 1948, the title was changed to the Brigham Young Universe (1948–1956), and in 1956 this was updated to simply The Daily Universe. The Universe is part of a larger news organization called BYU NewsNet, which was one of the first integrated (web, radio, newspaper, and television) news organization in the world.

The paper was printed Monday through Friday, except during school breaks and some holidays. It was distributed free of charge on BYU campus and is sent around the world to alumni and friends of the university for a small fee. On January 12, 2012, the BYU College of Fine Arts and Communications announced the newspaper's move to digital. Beginning in 2012, content would continue to be published online daily, while the print newspaper would only be published once a week.

In 2017, The Universe partnered with HuffPost on a series called Listen to America to investigate issues facing Mormon millennials. In 2017 a satirical website was launched by BYU students called The Alternate Universe, mimicking The Onion on issues related to BYU and students.

== Operations ==
The editors, writers, photographers and copy editors are all students, some paid, some reporting for a journalism class. These students are overseen by a collection of school professors and other full-time staff, who help train students and maintain professional standards. The opinion pieces in the paper are overseen by an editorial board which includes student staff, professional staff, university professors and local professionals. Limitations on what the paper can publish has been an issue in years past with debate over content appropriate for the campus audience. Student editors are required to avoid any topic that is critical of the Church of Jesus Christ of Latter-day Saints (LDS Church), including examinations of polygamy and segregation in church history. Rules about content were established in 1970 and forbade coverage of drugs, sex education, birth control, and specifically, acid rock music. One student editor said there were many spoken and unspoken rules about what topics were permitted.

One of the paper's most popular features is the letter to the editor section, which routinely becomes a forum for campus issues or ideas. Police Beat is a popular ongoing round-up of eccentric reports to campus police.

== Notable alumni ==
- McKay Coppins, political journalist and staff writer at The Atlantic
- Caleb Turner, Real Salt Lake beat writer for KSL.com
- Jackson Payne, sportswriter for the Deseret News
