= BYU AdLab =

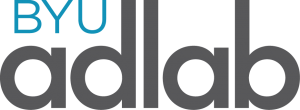
- Type: Private
- Industry: Advertising & Marketing
- Founded: 2003
- Founder: Jeff Sheets; Doug McKinlay
- Headquarters: Provo, UT, USA
- Owner: Brigham Young University
- Website: byuadlab.com

The BYU AdLab is an American advertising agency housed within the College of Fine Arts and Communications at Brigham Young University (BYU) in Provo, Utah. Founded by Jeff Sheets and Doug McKinlay, it is one of only a few university-sponsored advertising agencies in the world. The AdLab exists as a student-run, professionally mentored ad agency, bridging the gap between student and professional work.

The BYU AdLab is the only student agency to win a Professional One Show Pencil and is the only student agency of record for The Ad Council, producing over 40 national public service campaigns. The program has won hundreds of awards and was recognized as the One Show’s School of the Year in 2021 and 2024.

== History ==
Founded in 2003, the BYU AdLab first gained prominence with a campaign for the Office of the National Drug Control Policy portraying pictures of teenagers who made the choice themselves to say no to drugs. Jeff Sheets and Doug McKinlay realized that students didn't need fake assignments, but work in the real world. “If we want to produce the best ad graduates in the nation, we have to provide the educational experience in the nation.” Since then, the AdLab has collaborated with dozens of advertising agencies nationwide to produce numerous national clients, including Airbnb, Gatorade, Old Spice, Nike, Taco Bell, Volkswagen, Burger King, L'Oreal, EA Sports, the UNICEF Tap Project, Doritos, Haagen Dazs, Holiday Inn, Nestle, Ford, Verizon, General Mills, Taco Bell, Levi's, Spotify, Amazon, and more.

As a volunteer agency with the Ad Council, the AdLab has produced projects for the Library of Congress, the Office of National Drug Control Policy, the Coalition for Healthy Children, the American Cancer Society, and the United States Forest Service.

In 2011, the BYU AdLab became the first student-run ad agency to win a professional Pencil from the One Show. The program partnered with ad agency McCann Erickson to create a music video for Kyle Andrews, which received a Bronze Pencil in the music category. The music video featured an attempt at setting a Guinness World Record for the world's largest water balloon fight with 3927 participants and 120,021 water balloons.

The AdLab receives no funding from BYU, but generates all money from client projects. BYU Adlab graduates have gone on to work for notable ad agencies across the country, including Ogilvy, Leo Burnett, Wieden+Kennedy, Crispin Porter + Bogusky, Goodby, Silverstein & Partners, McCann Erickson, BBDO, Deutsch LA, TBWA\Chiat\Day, Innocean, and more. AdLab alumni have gone on to create notable ad campaigns including Allstate's "Mayhem", Apple's "Welcome Home," Old Spice's "The Man Your Man Can Smell Like," and Gatorade's "Be Like Mike" remix. Notable alumni who have had a significant impact in the advertising industry include Brent Anderson, Matt Miller, and Pierce Thiot.

== Awards and Recognition ==
The BYU AdLab has collected numerous awards and press mentions since being established.

=== 2018 ===
- Students from the AdLab won the top student award at the ANDYs for their commercial "Pests Do Not Mess With the Orkin Man," which was subsequently featured in Adweek.

=== 2019 ===
- In 2019 the AdLab was named the top college advertising program in the country by College Magazine.
- The BYU AdLab won the Student Gold ADDY Award for the Dorito's Nemesis campaign, one of only eight gold awards awarded by the American Advertising Federation from more than 60,000 applicants.

=== 2022 ===
- In 2022, BYU students claimed the Best Commercial award at the student Emmys with their commercial "Life's Journey," created by Tyler Richardson, Asher Huskinson, Rebekah Baker, and Campell George.

=== 2023 ===
- In 2023, the BYU AdLab won 28 Gold awards at the annual AAF American Advertising Awards competition.
- The AdLab won 11 Clio awards, 4 D&AD awards, 3 International ANDYs, Communication Arts Advertising Award of Excellence, and National Best of Show for the AAF ADDYs.
- The program was ranked second in the world for the One Club's Best Global Creative College
- The AdLab swept the annual Student Emmy awards competition for best Student Commercial with Andrew Rhee and Madi Hill’s commercial “Dear Vanessa”.

=== 2024 ===
- In 2024, the BYU AdLab was named School of the Year by the One Club Young Ones student competition.
- Students won 51 awards during the One Club’s Creative Week in New York.
- Professor Jeff Sheets was named the 2024 Distinguished Advertising Educator of the Year by the American Advertising Federation.
- The BYU AdLab was named the winner of the 2024 Coca-Cola Refreshing Films program. Students Adam Sheets and Destinee Neville won both the competition’s Grand Prize and the Cinemark Fan Favorite Award for their commercial “Signs of Friendship.”
- For the fifth year in a row, the BYU AdLab swept the Student Emmy nominations for Best Student TVCommercial/PSA in the annual College Television Awards. Students Remington Butler, Alex McBride, and Tanner Jackson won the school’s fifth straight award for their commercial “No One is Alone.”
- Students Abby Jensen and Shelby Moore won the 15th Annual Washington Media Scholars Foundation Competition for their work on the Media Plan Case Competition.
- The program took third place in the annual National Student Advertising Competition.

== AAF Most Promising Multicultural Student Award Winners ==
The BYU AdLab has a long history of students being recognized as Most Promising Multicultural Students by the American Advertising Federation. Since 2019, 25 program graduates have received this recognition.

AAF Most Promising Multicultural Student Award Winners
Class of 2019	Erin Gazdik, Jessica Nugent, Lorien Pereyra, Pablo Perez
Class of 2020	Enoch Lui, Ashley Poelman
Class of 2021	Kofi Aidoo, Rebekah Baker, Evelyn Harper, Haliamai Kealoha, Lillian Maero, Joseph Nugent, Donna Wilson
Class of 2022	Madison Hill, Andrew Rhee
Class of 2023	Brianna Aguilar, John Starkweather, Christopher Mercado, Bri Lucero
Class of 2024	Gabriel Bori, Eli Wright
Class of 2025	Joel Garcia, Ariela Hernandez, Jeremy Lewis, Abish Lopez
