= Harry Anderson (artist) =

American illustrator and painter

- self portrait
- Born: August 11, 1906; Chicago, Illinois, US
- Died: November 19, 1996 (aged 90); Danbury, Connecticut
- Education: Syracuse University School of Art
- Known for: Painting, Illustration
- Awards: New York Art Directors Club, Society of Illustrators' Hall of Fame
- Patrons: Seventh-day Adventist Church, LDS Church, Exxon, numerous magazines

Joseph Harry Anderson (August 11, 1906 – November 19, 1996) was an American illustrator and a member of the Illustrator's Hall of Fame. A devout Seventh-day Adventist artist, he is best known for Christian-themed illustrations he painted for the Adventist church and the Church of Jesus Christ of Latter-day Saints (LDS Church). He was also a popular illustrator of short stories in American weekly magazines during the 1930s and early 1940s.

== Biography ==
Harry's father Joseph named all his male children "Joseph" so each son went by their middle names, thus Harry Anderson is the name he went by. Originally intending to be a mathematician, in 1925 while attending the University of Illinois, Joseph Harry Anderson discovered a talent and love for drawing and painting. In 1927, he moved to Syracuse, New York, and attended the Syracuse University School of Art with friend and fellow artist Tom Lovell for classical art education. He graduated in 1931 during the Great Depression and had difficulty making a living. Within a year he earned enough by doing art for magazines to return home to Chicago. By 1937 he was working on national advertising campaigns and doing work for several major magazines; the names of his clients were American Airlines, American Magazine, Buster Brown Shoes, Coca-Cola, Collier's, Cosmopolitan, Cream of Wheat, Esso, Ford, Good Housekeeping, Humble Oil, John Hancock Mutual Life Insurance Company, Ladies' Home Journal, Massachusetts Mutual, Ovaltine, Redbook, The Saturday Evening Post, Woman's Home Companion, Wyeth and others.

The painting What Happened to Your Hand? became a ubiquitous print in Sunday schools and churches during the 1950s and 1960s.

In 1938, Anderson married Ruth Young Huebel, a girl who worked in his building and posed for him on one occasion. The following year he went to work for Haddon Sundblom's studio. In 1944, Anderson and his wife joined the Seventh-day Adventist Church and, by request, in 1945 he did his first painting of Jesus. Anderson's painting, What Happened to Your Hand?, depicting Jesus with modern-day children was decried as blasphemous by some adults, but was eventually printed in the publishing program after the editor's daughter longingly wished that she too could sit on Jesus' lap like the girl in the painting. This was the very first painting of Jesus done showing Him in a modern-day setting. From that time on, he split his time between commercial illustrations and religious ones. He painted approximately 300 religious-themed illustrations for Review and Herald Publishing Association at near minimum wage.

Anderson was featured in a 1956 issue of American Artist and received awards from several associations throughout his career. He was awarded the New York Art Directors Club. In 1994, he was inducted into the Society of Illustrators' Hall of Fame.

In the mid-1960s, he was commissioned to create a number of paintings for the Church of Jesus Christ of Latter-day Saints. He painted a large oil mural of Jesus ordaining his apostles for the church's pavilion at the 1964 New York World's Fair. Following this, he did nearly two dozen more paintings for the LDS Church; enlarged re-paintings of many of these are displayed in the Temple Square Visitors Center and the lobby of the Church Office Building in Salt Lake City, Utah, and at other prominent church locations. Re-prints of some of Anderson's paintings can be found hanging in nearly every LDS Church meetinghouse and temple in the world. The paintings are also still widely used by the church for many of its printed and online materials.

In his 70s and 80s, Anderson made western-themed paintings for several fine art galleries.

== Biographies ==
- Harry Anderson: The Man Behind the Paintings, Woolsey, Raymond H. and Anderson, Ruth.
- Tippett, H. M. "Harry Anderson: Nationally Known Illustrator". I Became a Seventh-day Adventist. Washington, D.C.: Review and Herald. pp. 53–56.
- Illustration Magazine #12, Winter 2004, pages 44–62

== See also ==
- Mormon art
