= Paige Crosland Anderson =

American abstract painter

- Born: Paige Elizabeth Crosland
- Known for: Painting
- Awards: Purchase Award, International Art Competition, Church History Museum
- Website: paigeandersonart.com

Paige Crosland Anderson is an abstract painter from the United States.

== Career ==
In 2011, Anderson obtained a BFA from Brigham Young University (BYU) as a valedictorian and was named a commencement speaker. Known for her geometric paintings that invoke pioneer quilts and Mormon culture. After graduating from BYU, Anderson gained representation and then began to show work in a number of galleries and shows.

The themes of Anderson's work included quilts, geometric shapes, patterns, endlessness, and eternity. Anderson explains, "Pioneer quilt patterns are symbols of my cultural heritage. Not only I am the descendant of Mormon pioneers who crossed the plains but also my grandmother Donna was an expert quilter. Quilting is work that reveals its toil only on close inspection. That is the way I want my artwork to be. I believe it's a metaphor for a life well-lived. In my art-making process, I paint the same pattern several times in different colors until there are an indiscernible number of underlayers. The viewer may only see hints of the effort that is behind the final product but that is intentional. The layers, the repetition, the colors, and the pattern itself are all avenues by which my work could be accessed by the viewer."

== Awards ==
Anderson was a Purchase Award winner at the 10th International Art Competition, Tell Me The Stories of Jesus, a juried exhibition at the Church History Museum in Salt Lake City, Utah. She received Honorable Mention from the annual Zion Art Competition in 2016. She was selected honorable mention at the 96th Annual Spring Salon, a juried exhibition at the Springville Art Museum in Springville, Utah.

== Personal life ==
Anderson grew up in Provo, Utah and lives in Salt Lake City, Utah. She is a member of the Church of Jesus Christ of Latter-day Saints and is married with two daughters. She and her husband previously lived in Washington, D.C. and Bologna, Italy.
