= BYU bands and ensembles =

BYU has a broad array of bands and ensembles. Most of which are a part of the programs of the School of Music in the BYU College of Fine Arts and Communications, primarily either in the Department of Bands or the Jazz Studies Department.

== History ==
The first band at the original Brigham Young Academy (BYA) was organized in about 1900 by Albert Miller (birth name Ernest Ludwig Adelbert Muller, lived 1875–1906), a German Mormon who was recruited to be on the music faculty at BYA by Anthony C. Lund in 1901. In 1901 Miller recruited as his assistant Robert Sauer, who he had known in Dresden, Germany before immigrating to America.

In 1906, after Miller died, Robert Sauer (1873–1944), a German convert to the Church of Jesus Christ of Latter-day Saints, became the director of the BYU band. Sauer remained the band director until 1942. At the end of Sauer's time as band director, BYU had one band that had 35 instruments.

John R. Halliday then became the band director in 1942. During his eight-year tenure, BYU's band department expanded to 3 bands with 225 people playing instruments. Halliday would remain with BYU, with the exception of two years he did post-doctoral studies at the University of Southern California until his retirement in 1976 (when he became president of the Italy Milan Mission) but would spend most of the next 25 years as a director of choirs.

In 1950, Norman Hunt became the director of BYU bands. In 1953, Ralph G. Laycock became the director of BYU bands.

== Wind Symphony ==
The BYU Wind Symphony has 45 members. Over the years it has performed in many locations across the United States and twenty other countries. It is currently directed by Dr. Shawn Smith.

== Symphonic Band ==
The BYU Symphonic Band is an auditioned band with about 75 members. Many members are music-majors but the audition is offered to students from all majors of study. The band performs two concerts per semester.

== University Bands ==
There are two non-auditioned University Bands. Each group rehearses one night per week during Winter semester in preparation for their annual concert at the end of the semester.

== Cougar Marching Band ==
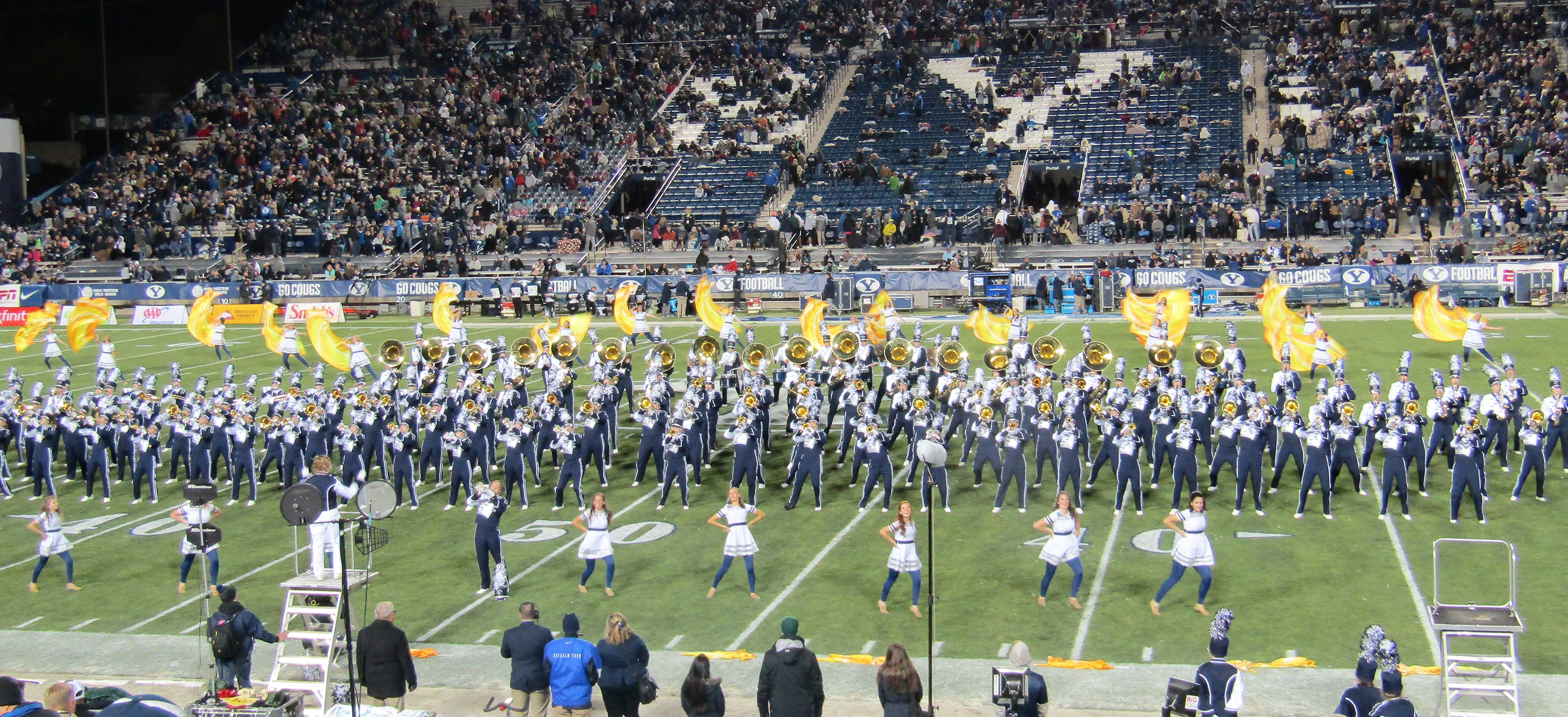
BYU Cougar Marching Band at halftime

Known today as the "Power of the Wasatch", The BYU Cougar Marching Band was first organized in 1908 by Robert Sauer who wrote the well known tune "When It's Springtime in the Rockies". Years later, in 1943, the band was found as part of the school´s ROTC. In 1953, control of the band was given to the College of Fine Arts (which still sponsors the band today) with Richard A. Ballou as its director and Grant Elkington as the first drum major. Since then the band has been led under the direction of Elkington, Bruce Bastian, Dan Bachelder, David Blackinton, and Donald Peterson.

Today the Marching Band is a 225-member band directed by Fred McInnis. Prior to 2008, the band held rehearsals in the parking lot of the Marriott Center and utilized storage space inside Conference Center, which sits adjacent to the Caroline Hemenway Harman Building. The current home of the BYU Marching Band is the Cougar Marching Band Hall, which includes rehearsal space, instrument storage areas, and band staff offices. It was built and completed in 2008 and is located in the southwest corner of LaVell Edwards Stadium. The band rehearses in the west stadium parking lot next to Lavell Edwards Stadium. In 2011 a permanent rehearsal tower, with an integrated sound system and two observation levels, was built in the parking lot for use by the marching band.

The band puts on pregame and halftime shows at all home football games and will generally travel with the team versus in state rivals and for postseason bowl appearances. The band has a tradition of marching from the baseball complex into LaVell Edwards Stadium about forty-five minutes before each game begins, stopping in front of the Cougar statue outside the southwest corner of the stadium to play for fans about to enter the stands. Shortly after the conclusion of each game, the band lines up and marches to the same spot outside the stadium to offer a short concert to fans lingering after the game, always concluding with the singing of BYU's traditional "College Song".

The band also performs at the Rocky Mountain Marching Band Invitational, a high school competition hosted by the school the second Tuesday of October each year, and in its own concert towards the end of the season in November in the Concert Hall on campus.

To become part of the BYU Cougar Marching Band, potential participants must be actively attending Brigham Young University.

The main cadence for the drumline is called synergy and is a collection of different cadences and changes in some way every year. The band participates via vocals which are scattered throughout the piece. The average size of the drumline is 5 bases, 5 tenors, 8–10 snares, and 8–10 cymbals. The Drumline holds their camp one week prior to the general band camp.

=== Visitor's Fight Song (since 2023) ===
Under Fred McInnis's leadership, the Cougar Marching Band began playing visiting team fight songs in every home game pregame show.

== ROC Bands ==
BYU has two pep bands that perform at both men's and women's basketball games respectively. Referred to as the ROC (Roar Of Cougars) Bands, named after the BYU Student Sections at athletic events, the pep bands perform at most regular season home games and often travel with the team in post-season tournaments. Through their music they help pump up the crowd and create the excitement found in the college hoops atmosphere at the Marriott Center.

== Jazz ensembles ==
BYU has a large array of Jazz ensembles. Three of these perform music in the Big Band tradition. The premier band in this group is Synthesis which was founded by K. Newell Dayley and is currently directed by Ray Smith. Synthesis has performed at several Jazz festivals in many locations in the US as well as in some other countries. The Jazz Ensemble functions as the training group for Synthesis and is currently directed by Mark Ammons. Their performance schedule is less expansive than Synthesis', primarily performing in Provo and its immediate vicinity when performing beyond BYU Campus. There is also the Jazz Lab Band, which performs twice a year on campus.

Smaller groups in different styles include Q'd Up the Faculty Jazz quintet that as of 2011 consisted of Ray Smith, Steve Lindeman, Matt Larson, Jay Lawrence and Ron Brough. There is also the Jazz Legacy Dixieland Band which has performed across the US, the Salsa Combo and then 5 other groups that perform in "casual" format. The salsa and other five combos are all directed by Jay Lawrence.

There are also three Jazz vocal groups. Jazz Voices, Vocal Point and Vocal Jazz Ensemble.

== Other ensembles ==
BYU has three other faculty ensembles: Orpheus Winds, Brassworks, and the American Piano Quartet.

Other student ensembles include the Clarinet Choir, the Flute Choir, the Trombone Choir, The Brass Chamber Music group, the String Chamber Music Group, and the Woodwind Chamber Music Group. There is also a collection of folk music ensembles, some of which work with the BYU International Folk Dancers.

== Percussion ==
Besides performing in many of the bands listed above, BYU's percussion section also has a percussion ensemble.
