= Orpheus Winds =

Faculty woodwind quintet at Brigham Young University

Orpheus Winds is the faculty woodwind quintet at Brigham Young University (BYU).

== History ==
Orpheus Winds was formed in the 1970s at Brigham Young University by one of its charter members, Glenn Willams, a BYU music professor. The ensemble is one of the most renowned woodwind quintets in Western North America. The ensemble performs nationally and internationally including tours in Canada, the United Kingdom, Mexico, and Brazil. They regularly perform at BYU in the Franklin S. Harris Fine Arts Center. The ensemble does not have a director and members of the ensemble choose pieces of music to perform.

== Members ==
The members include professors at the BYU School of Music Christina Castellanos (flute), Christian Tran (oboe), Brian Blanchard (horn), Jaren Hinckley (clarinet), and Christian Smith (bassoon).
