= Kathleen Peterson (artist) =

American painter

- Born: Kathleen Peterson; 1951 (age 74–75)
- Known for: Painting, Illustration
- Awards: International Art Competition, Church History Museum
- Website: kathleenpetersonart.com

Kathleen Peterson (born 1951) is a painter and illustrator from the United States.

== Career ==
Peterson studied art and dance at Brigham Young University (BYU). She works primarily in watercolor, pastel, pen and ink, batik, and oils. One reviewed explained, "There is much about sisterhood and motherhood in Peterson's oils; her warm palette narratives plead for peace, love and understanding."

Peterson's work has been included in numerous art exhibits including at the Central Utah Art Center. A series of 11 paintings of women from the scriptures were exhibited at the LDS Conference Center in Salt Lake City, Utah. She has been commissioned by Deseret Book Company for numerous book illustrations. Peterson is the illustrator for the Girls Who Choose God series of books.

=== Books ===
- Girls Who Choose God: Stories of Courageous Women from the Bible by McArthur Krishna and Bethany Brady Spalding. Illustrated by Kathleen Peterson. (Deseret Book Company, August 25, 2014, ISBN 978-1609078829)
- Girls Who Choose God: Stories of Strong Women from the Book of Mormon by McArthur Krishna and Bethany Brady Spalding. Illustrated by Kathleen Peterson. (Deseret Book Company, October 12, 2015, ISBN 978-1629721019)
- Pele and Poliahu by Malia Collins. Illustrated by Kathleen Peterson. (BeachHouse Publishing, September 10, 2018, ISBN 978-1949000030)
- Girls Who Choose God: Stories of Extraordinary Women from Church History by McArthur Krishna and Bethany Brady Spalding. Illustrated by Kathleen Peterson. (Deseret Book Company, October 8, 2019, ISBN 978-1629726274)

== Awards ==
Peterson was included in the 10th International Art Competition, Tell Me The Stories of Jesus, a juried exhibition at the Church History Museum in Salt Lake City, Utah.

== Personal life ==
Peterson grew up in Provo, Utah and now lives in Spring City, Utah. She is a member of the Church of Jesus Christ of Latter-day Saints and is married and the mother of four children. She has been working to save two historic buildings in Utah's Sanpete Valley.
