= Minerva Teichert =

American painter of Western and LDS art (1888–1976)

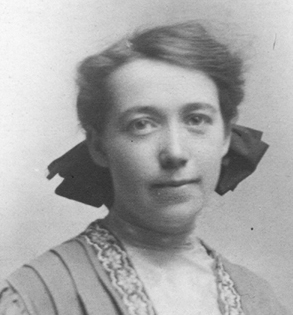
- Teichert in 1908
- Born: August 28, 1888; Ogden, Utah Territory
- Died: May 3, 1976 (aged 87); Provo, Utah, U.S.
- Education: Art Institute of Chicago, Art Students League of New York
- Known for: Western Art, Mormon Art
- Notable work: Christ in a Red Robe, Queen Esther, and Return of Captive Israel

Minerva Bernetta Kohlhepp Teichert (August 28, 1888 – May 3, 1976) was a 20th-century American artist who painted Western and Mormon subjects, including murals of scenes from the Book of Mormon. She received her art education from the Art Institute of Chicago and the Art Students League of New York, and was a member of the Church of Jesus Christ of Latter-day Saints (LDS Church). Religious-themed artwork by Teichert includes Christ in a Red Robe, Queen Esther, and Rescue of the Lost Lamb. She painted 42 murals related to stories in the Book of Mormon which reside in Brigham Young University's (BYU) Museum of Art. Teichert was the first woman invited to paint a mural for an LDS Church temple.

== Early life ==
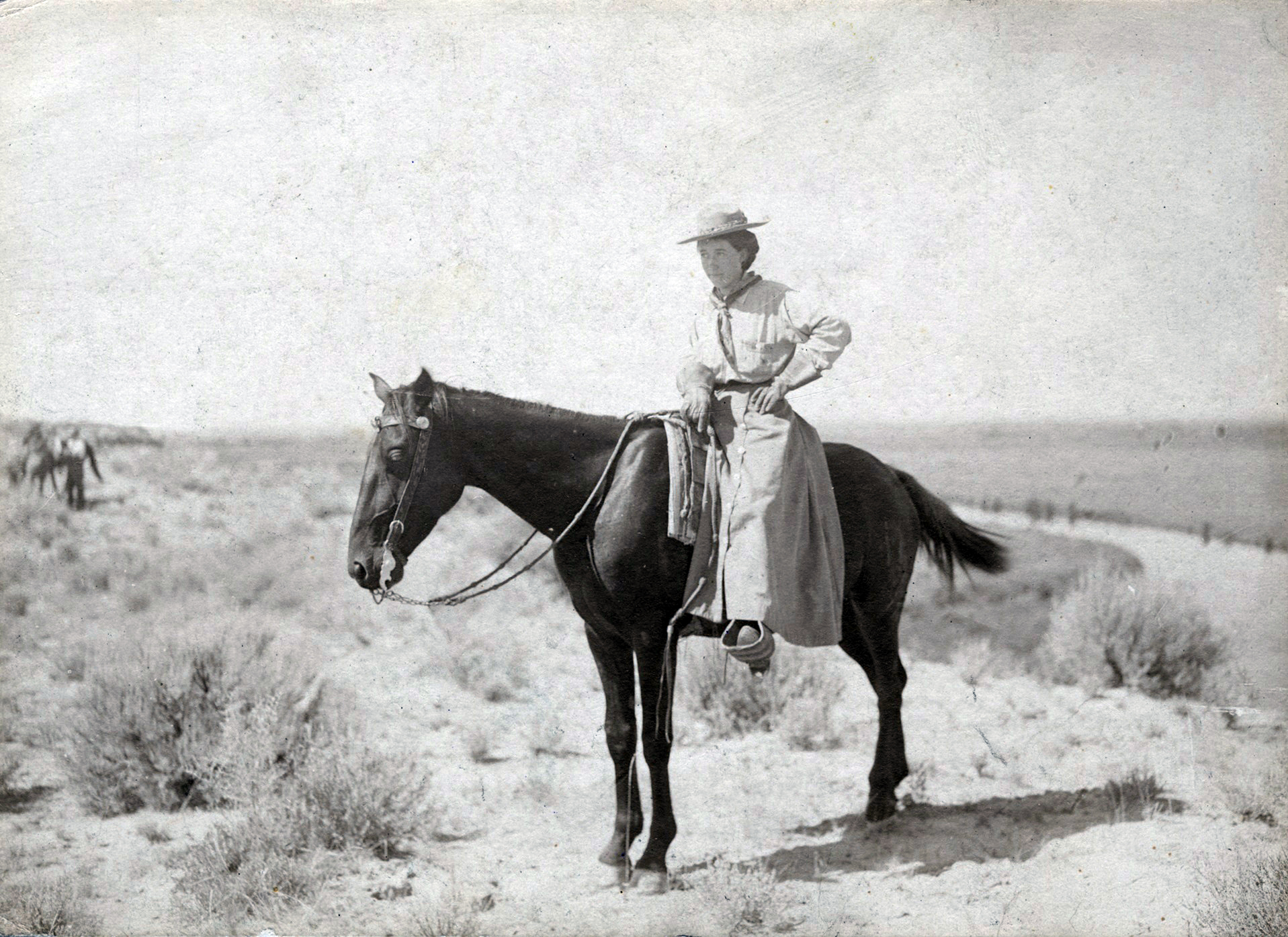
Portrait of Teichert on horseback

Minerva Teichert was born on August 28, 1888, in Ogden, Utah Territory. She was the second of ten children born to Frederick John Kohlhepp, a railroad worker and rancher, and Mary Ella Hickman, a suffragette and pamphleteer. Teichert grew up on a ranch in Idaho, taking advantage of her upbringing by sketching horses and ranch life from a young age. Her mother gave Teichert her first set of watercolors when she was just four years old. For entertainment, she acted out plays and helped her father work on the farm. She enjoyed riding her horse, and exploring and sketching scenes from nature. Both of her parents supported her creativity and imagination. She was named after her maternal grandmother, Minerva Wade Hickman, who was one of the wives of frontier lawman and express rider "Wild Bill" Hickman, and also a descendant of Colonial Governor Thomas Roberts of New Hampshire.

Teichert's mother was an educated woman, who attended the Sacred Heart Academy in Ogden, Utah, instructed in language, arts, and music. She was of English, Scottish, Irish, Welsh, French, Belgian, Spanish, and German ancestry. Teichert's father had come from a wealthy German-immigrant Jewish family in Boston, Massachusetts. He moved west as a young man in 1878. He hunted bison and bear, and worked on ranches near Buffalo, Wyoming, and in the Powder River area. He drifted into Utah through Brown's Hole and the Uintah Basin, finally making it to the mining town of Stockton, Utah, southwest of the Salt Lake Valley. He was baptized into the LDS Church in 1886. Fred and Mary married in 1887, and moved to Pocatello, Idaho, a few years later. Fred sustained an eye injury while working in the railroad yards, which required the family to move frequently to various rural communities where they would open and run small shops. Due to the lack of schools in the area, Teichert and her siblings were frequently homeschooled, therefore Teichert did not receive a formal primary education.

She left Idaho at age 14 to be a nursemaid in San Francisco. It was in San Francisco that she saw an art museum for the first time. She also took some classes at the Mark Hopkins Art School. She returned home, and after graduating from Pocatello High School, she taught in Idaho to earn money to travel east.

== Chicago and New York education ==
Teichert studied at the Art Institute of Chicago under John Vanderpoel. While in Chicago, she became known as "Miss Idaho". She finished her courses in 1912 and returned to Indian Warm Springs, Idaho, to earn more money. During this time, she was courted by two young men. She also met her future husband, Herman Teichert. She left Herman and Idaho to pursue art. She studied at the Art Students League of New York in 1914, where she studied under Robert Henri, George Bridgman, and Dimitri Romanoffski. Henri gave Minerva a scholarship and ranked her among his best three students. Minerva earned money for school by sketching cadavers for medical schools. She also illustrated children's books and performed rope tricks and Indian dances. She was known for a headband that she wore throughout her life, which may have come from these performances. Teichert was offered a scholarship to study in London, but instead returned home to get married.

In 1917, she returned to Idaho. On September 15, 1917, she married Herman Adolph Teichert. After their marriage, he left to fight in World War I. The couple had five children. Minerva spent most of her life on a ranch in Cokeville, Wyoming, while painting the things she knew and loved best: scenes from western Americana, and religious artwork expressing her deeply held convictions. During her early years of marriage, she sketched on scraps of wood and paper because there wasn't enough money to buy art supplies.

== Career ==
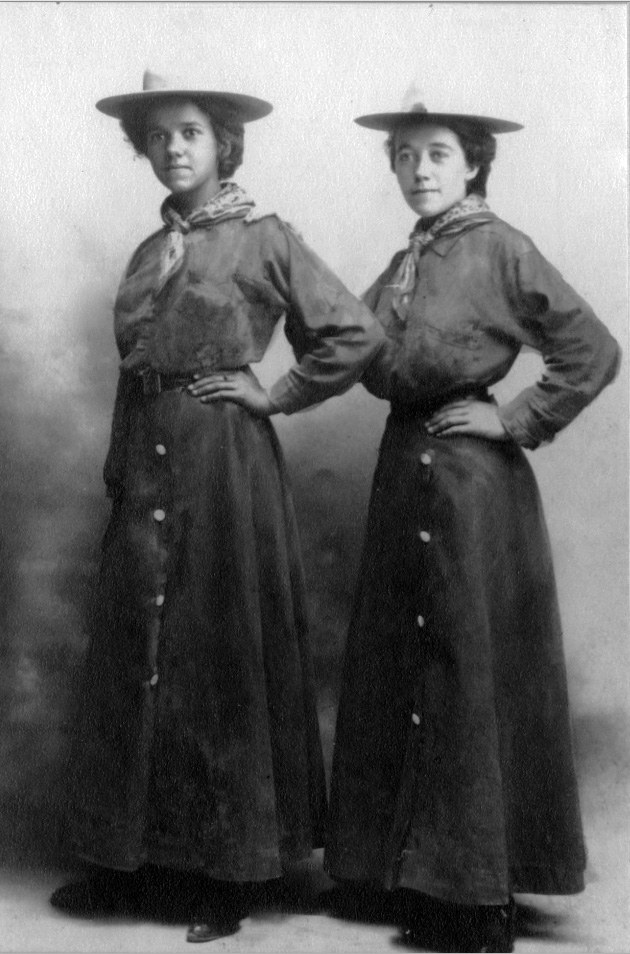
Minerva Teichert (then Kohlhepp) at age 20 (on the right) with her sister Eda (age 16)

Teichert painted throughout her life. She painted in her living room; while working on murals, she folded her canvas and used the large end of a pair of binoculars to look at her work in perspective. She once explained "I must paint", when asked about how she persisted in painting despite being in near-complete artistic isolation, without a dedicated studio or even much free time to create. Teichert was an independent, opinionated woman who stood up for women's rights and was an outspoken political conservative. She shared her talents with others and gave art lessons out of her home. In addition to her art career, she raised five children and took care of her homestead and ranch.

In 1947, Teichert won first prize in the LDS Church's centennial art contest and was the first woman to paint a mural for an LDS temple. In the mid-1940s, having achieved success painting murals, Teichert began painting a series of murals related to stories from the Book of Mormon. She originally considered making plays on the subject of the Book of Mormon, but instead made paintings. She used live models, costumes based on sketches she had done while traveling in Mexico, and painted backdrops. She gained inspiration through scholarly writers such as Hugh Nibley.

== Style and works ==
Women and western themes feature prominently in Teichert's works, such as The Madonna of 1847, which depicts a mother and child in a covered wagon, crossing the plains to settle in Utah. Teichert painted over 400 murals, and is known for those inside the Manti Utah Temple, as well as a set of 42 murals depicting events in the Book of Mormon. In the mid-1950s, she put the Book of Mormon murals on slides for presentations. Despite wanting to make them available in book form, this would not happen in her lifetime. Though among her most noted works, Teichert did not paint the Book of Mormon murals under specific commission, but intended them for display at a "temple of art." She corresponded with high LDS Church officials such as J. Reuben Clark regarding her hopes dreamed this museum and school of art would someday be built in Salt Lake City. Teichert also painted murals for the LDS Church's tabernacle in Montpelier, Idaho. They were temporarily removed to make space for a heating system, and returned during the tabernacle's renovation.

Teichert's distinctive style can be seen in the painting Christ in the Red Robe, in which women can be seen reaching out to Christ. He is depicted in a red robe at his second coming, referencing Isaiah. The colors are mostly subdued, except for the central figure who is brightly illustrated.

Teichert painted much of the clothing with patterns, a detail unique to her paintings. She would also include the color red to add contrast. She often left the edges unfinished or just sketched. Many of her paintings are filled with the colors from the desert and feature distant mountains. Teichert submitted many pieces of artwork to the LDS Church; however, during her lifetime, many of them were rejected. She gave several paintings to BYU and also painted a mural for the university in exchange for tuition for 19 family members and friends. These beneficiaries included Barbara Dayton Perry. Her works are prolifically displayed around the BYU campus. Several of her paintings can be seen in the Joseph Smith Building, the Wilkinson Student Center, and the Museum of Art. One of Teichert's most famous exhibits, "Pageants in Paint", has been on display in the Museum of Art. Several of Teichert's works are also on display on the campus of Brigham Young University–Idaho. Teichert's Book of Mormon murals are part of the collection at the BYU Museum of Art.

== Church service ==
Teichert was a member of the LDS Church, and her faith impacted the subjects of much of her work. She was the first woman sent on an art mission by the church, first to Chicago, and then to New York City before she attended the Art Students League. She served in various responsibilities in the church, including Primary president and on the Stake Sunday School Board. She also worked in the Young Women organization.

Her husband, Herman, was not a member of the church when the couple was married. He supported her activity in the church and donated tithing. He was later baptized in 1933. The couple was sealed the following year in the Logan Utah Temple. She and her husband had five children.

Teichert continued painting into her seventies. She had to stop painting due to a hip fracture from a fall in 1970. She entered a nursing home in 1973 and died in Provo, Utah, on May 3, 1976. She was buried in the cemetery in Cokeville, Wyoming.

== Legacy ==
During Teichert's lengthy career, she is believed to have created thousands of paintings. The Utah Museum of Fine Arts in Salt Lake City, Utah, currently owns two works by Teichert: "Battle of the Bulls", dated circa 1946, and "Market Girl", circa 1912. "Pioneers: Water Scene," from 1936, is in the collection of the Brigham City Museum. Along with other renowned American artists of the twentieth-century, Teichert's work was featured in the semi-permanent exhibition "Becoming America" at BYU's Museum of Art from 2019 to 2022.

== Lost work ==
In the aftermath of the 17 December 2010 Provo Tabernacle fire, the fate of the 1934 Teichert painting Restoration of the Melchizedek Priesthood, which had been inside the tabernacle, remained unknown until 22 December. Due to the significance of the painting, the Provo fire marshal permitted members of the fire task force to enter the east end of the ruined building despite dangerous conditions. In the late afternoon, searchers located the remnants of the painting. The material was photographed and diagrammed before being turned over to BYU Risk Management officials for transportation to the property owners for preservation. Fire crews stated that, had they been aware of the significance of the painting, they would have made efforts to recover it prior to the collapse of the building's roof.

The painting was almost completely destroyed by the fire–its remnants were identifiable primarily by the melted Plexiglass of its protective cover. A charred, L-shaped fragment approximately 72.5" by 19.5" that had been wrapped around a wooden support near the bottom of the canvas was all that remained of the painting after the fire. The fragment was displayed along with 45 original Teichert paintings at an exhibit at the Church History Museum from July 2023-July 2024.

The painting, valued at $1.5 million (10% of the building's total estimated loss in the fire), was self-insured by the church. The loss resulted in a project to catalog all original artworks in the church's buildings throughout the United States and Canada, an effort which tallied ten Teichert paintings in need of restoration or preservation.

Some other Teichert work was painted over by the artist herself. For example, an unnamed painting depicting seagulls saving Mormon pioneers from a plague of crickets was shown in the Salt Lake Tribune in 1931. No other image of the work was known until the 2021 conservation efforts to the Teichert painting Saved by Seagulls. During conservation, infrared photography of the canvas revealed the remnants of the earlier gull painting, which included an elderly man in a central position rather than the young woman featured in the later version.

== Conservation ==
In March 2021, the LDS Church announced that historic murals had been removed from the interior of the Salt Lake Temple during a renovation project aimed at increasing temple capacity. As part of a similar project, it was also announced that nearly 4000 square feet of mural painting by Teichert would be removed from the World Room of Manti Utah Temple. The mural covered the entire interior wall surface of the room, which Teichert's grandson described as the Latter-day Saint equivalent of the Sistine Chapel. Plans called for the murals at both the Manti and Salt Lake temples to be "carefully photographed and documented before removal," and noted "some of the original portions are being preserved in the church's archives."

The plan attracted considerable public outcry, and 12 days later, officials amended the plans for the Manti Temple, announcing their intent to secure the advice of art preservation experts. In May, it was announced the Teichert mural would remain in place, and instead of making the extensive planned interior changes at the Manti Temple, the church would build the Ephraim Utah Temple seven miles away.

Teichert's mural in the Manti Temple underwent conservation efforts by Parma Conservation between fall 2021 and spring 2024. Following this and associated renovations to the temple, the murals were viewable by the general public for the first time since 1985 during an open house in March and April 2024. The Church History Department indicated the art was in "very good condition" and that, following minor repair, about 98% of the mural was original, giving an overall appearance very close to Teichert's original work. Conservation workers also removed potentially problematic protective varnish that had been applied to the lower 8 feet of the mural during earlier preservation efforts, replacing it with modern, conservation-grade varnish over the entire mural surface for the first time.

== Ownership disputes ==
In June 2021, Tim Teichert, a grandson of the artist and the executor of her estate, filed a lawsuit against the church in the Wyoming 3rd Judicial District court after he noticed three original Teichert paintings, Relief Society Quilting, Cast Your Nets on the Other Side, and Handcart Pioneers had been removed from the faith's meetinghouse in Cokeville, Wyoming. The Teichert estate alleged that during March or April 2020, while the building was closed and inaccessible to the public in consequence of the COVID-19 pandemic, the paintings had been replaced with prints of the same works by the Church History Department. Alan Johnson, director of the Church History Museum indicated the paintings had been removed at the direction of the church’s First Presidency as part of a series of removals of Teichert originals from various local meetinghouses ahead of an exhibition at the BYU Museum of Art. Johnson also pointed to the loss of an original Teichert painting in the 2010 Provo Tabernacle fire, which prompted a cataloging of original artworks in the church's possession. Noting the conditions and capabilities of local buildings and the large numbers of people who had access to them, Johnson noted that church leaders had instructed the Teichert paintings should be relocated to Church Headquarters.

The removal of the three Cokeville paintings during the COVID-19 pandemic followed the 2014 removal of another Teichert painting, The Song of Quetzalcoatl (over which the estate did not claim copyright ownership), to the Star Valley Wyoming Temple over the family's objections. The Teichert estate said the artist had placed the paintings in the Cokeville meetinghouse in 1955 with the understanding they would remain there, and if they were ever removed, they would be returned to estate heirs. Members of the family said they had reached out to LDS apostle L. Tom Perry, (whose wife, Barbara Dayton Perry, grew up in Cokeville and whose father had served as one of Teichert's models for Christ). Perry reportedly visited with the Church Historian and Recorder, and subsequently assured the family the paintings would not be removed from the Cokeville chapel. The church, in turn, said Teichert had donated the art prior to her death. The matter was set for decision by jury trial in Wyoming federal court in September 2023.

In a separate case, the Teichert estate filed a federal suit in January 2023 in the California Central District Court against the church, BYU, the BYU Museum of Art, Deseret Management Corporation, Desert Book Company, and Latter-day Home LLC. The suit claimed the defendants had each violated copyright by selling unauthorized reproductions of numerous Teichert artworks and profiting from unauthorized use of the artist's name and image. Representatives of the church and BYU claim they own both the disputed paintings and their copyrights.

== See also ==
- Mormon art
