= Miranda Meeks =

American illustrator

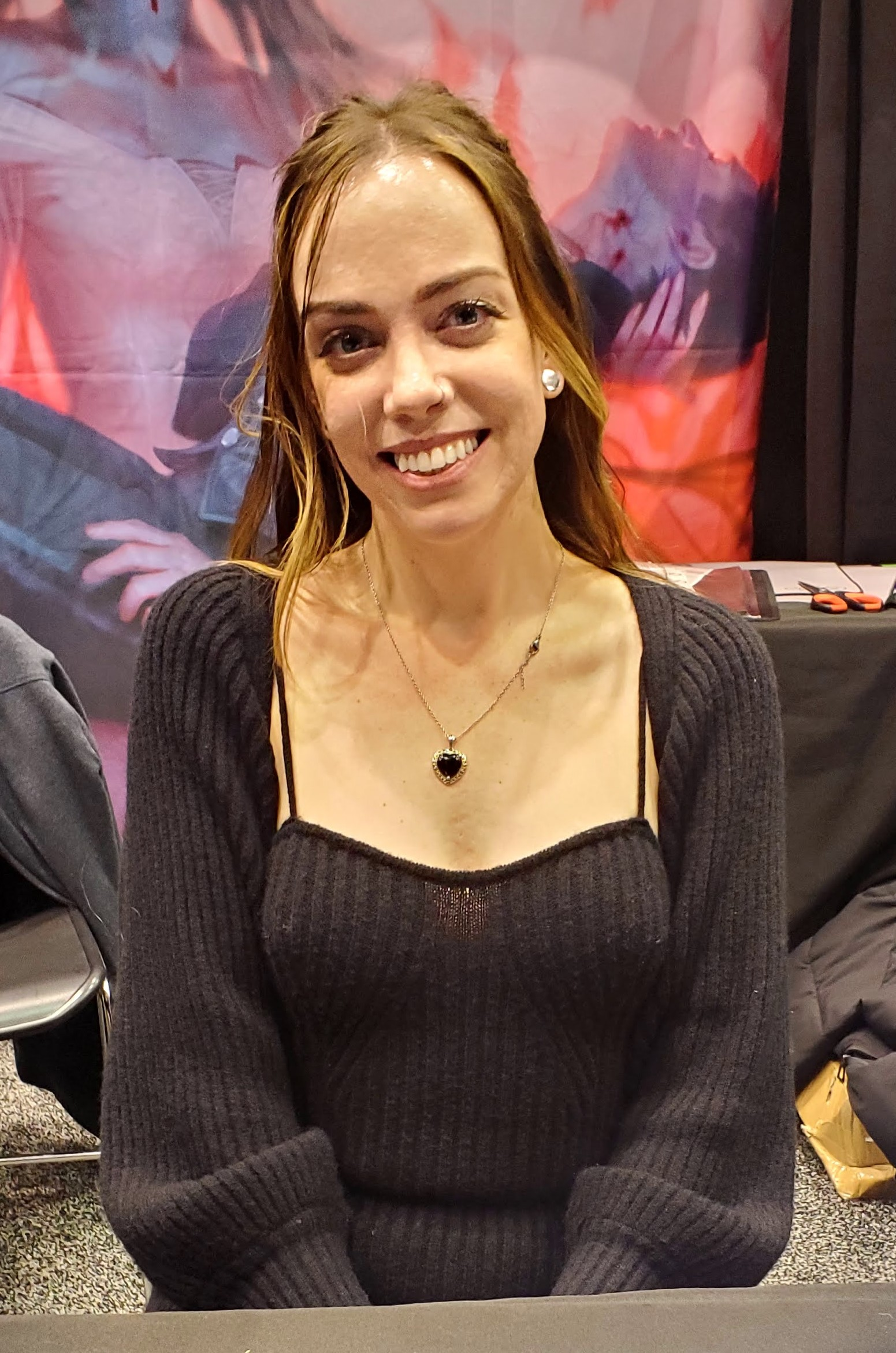
- Meeks at MagicCon Chicago in 2024
- Known for: Illustration, Digital Artist
- Website: mirandameeks.com

Miranda Meeks is an American illustrator and digital artist.

Her work, mostly digital, has been described as "soft and detailed with a touch of mystery," "haunting atmosphere," and "a dark, haunting aesthetic".

== Career ==
Meeks studied art and illustration at Brigham Young University (BYU) and attributes some of her inspiration and style to Alfred Hitchcock and Chris Van Allsburg. She explains her style, "Not only is my work defined by the subjects it portrays, but I try really hard to represent certain values and ideals in it. There’s this juxtaposition of beauty and strangeness that I find really intriguing and I’d love to help others who see my work to feel the same thing."

Meeks' work has been seen in editorial, concept art, video game art, and t-shirt designs. Clients include HarperCollins, Penguin Random House, Simon & Schuster, and Tor Books. Meeks created cover art for James Patterson's Maximum Ride series. She has been commissioned to create art for Magic: The Gathering.

In 2021, she was commissioned to create the art for Neil Gaiman's The Monarch of the Glen and Black Dog vinyl edition box set. Her work has been included in numerous exhibits, art shows, and online collections.

=== Books ===
- Feylin Lore: Reflections by P.A. Wikoff. Illustrated by Miranda Meeks. (Modern Tunic, June 8, 2017, ISBN 978-0999005804)
- The Fisher of Bones by Sarah Gailey. Illustrated by Miranda Meeks. (Fireside Fiction Company, September 15, 2017, ISBN 978-0998778327)

== Awards ==
Meeks received the 2018 Rising Star Award, American Illustration Award, Society of Illustrations 2013 Student Competition, and was nominated for the 2017 and 2018 Chesley Awards.

== Personal life ==
She is a member of the Church of Jesus Christ of Latter-day Saints and lives in Utah with her husband and two children.
