= Mormon art =

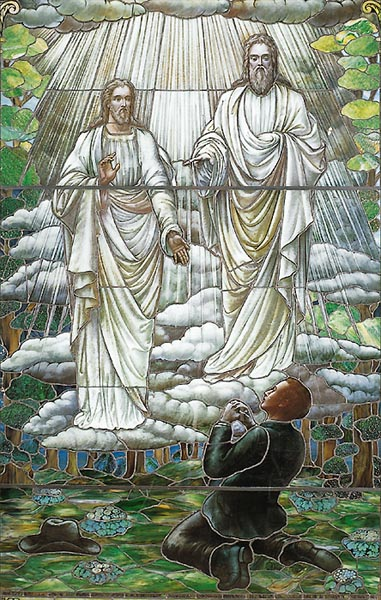
Joseph Smith's first vision (1913)

Mormon art comprises all visual art created to depict the principles and teachings of the Church of Jesus Christ of Latter-day Saints (LDS Church), as well as art deriving from the inspiration of an artist's LDS religious views. Mormon art includes painting, sculpture, quilt work, photography, graphic art, and other mediums, and shares common attributes reflecting Latter-day Saint teachings and values.

== Themes ==
Although the most common themes in Mormon art are historical and principle-based, specific to the LDS faith, the decade following the founding of the church on April 6, 1830, and continuing on through the end of second half of the 19th century, revealed little of these themes. Most artists who converted to the Mormon faith came from England and primarily exercised their talents by depicting the surrounding landscapes of the Mormon pioneer migration route. Their British art education concentrated on the traditional English Romantic style and theme rather than genre and historical themes. These themes are a rarity during the initial growth of the church. One of the few exceptions that strays from this category of Romantic art is a painting by William Armitage (1817–1890) of London. The painting depicts LDS founder Joseph Smith preaching to the Native Americans, and was commissioned by the church for the Salt Lake Temple.

The LDS Church places great importance on the power and use of art. Mormon art is circulated primarily within the church community via monthly magazines published by the church and church posters used for teaching Sunday School classes, Home and Visiting, and missionary work. The magazines that are distributed monthly to members with a subscription are the Ensign, the Liahona, the New Era, and The Friend. The purpose of Mormon art creation and circulation is to provide inspiration and encouragement to LDS members, and to instruct and remind them of the teaching and values of the church.

A popular method of reaching out to the youth is through "Mormonads" (posters with social or religious messages), which are available through the New Era (the LDS Church's youth magazine), the church's website, and independent church bookstores. Mormonads are available in poster-size and index-card sizes.

== Aesthetic diversity and commonality ==
Mormon art does not claim a particular style or aesthetic. Considered a young religion, Mormonism was founded in the early 19th century and has primarily expanded in the 20th century, when artistic and cultural freedom concurrently increased. Today, there are more members of the LDS church outside of the United States than within. Accordingly, Mormon art varies widely in style.

Richard G. Oman, expert on LDS art and curator of acquisitions for the LDS Church History Museum prior to 2010, states in an excerpt on visual artists in the Encyclopedia of Mormonism that the church purposefully holds no limitations on LDS artistic style to promote stylistic diversity:

"The absence of an official liturgical art has kept the Church from directing its artists into specified stylistic traditions. This has been especially conducive to variety in art as the Church has expanded into many different cultures, with differing artistic styles and traditions."

=== Diversity ===
The LDS church has tried to recognize the diverse demography and cultural differences within the LDS Church. Oman says that the church consequently embraces and promotes the various artistic attributes to "broaden [perspectives] so the Saints all over the world would be celebrated." The LDS Church's International Art Competition, started in 1987, encouraged submissions from members internationally. The juried competition and exhibition is held every three years, inviting LDS artists worldwide to create and submit works of art related to a gospel theme dedicated to the year in which it is held. A number of art pieces are then exhibited at the Church History Museum. The most recent was the Ninth International Art Competition, running from March 16, 2012 – October 14, 2012.

Despite this variety of styles produced by LDS artists from around the globe, all LDS art is interrelated by means of a shared religious belief. Oman also wrote of aesthetic uniformity: "Some of the aesthetic constants of LDS artists are the narrative tradition in painting, a reverence for nature, absence of nihilism, support of traditional societal values, respect for the human body, a strong sense of aesthetic structure, and rigorous craftsmanship" Another contributor to the Encyclopedia of Mormonism is Martha Moffitt Peacock, Professor in Art History and Associate Director for the Center for the Study of Europe at Brigham Young University. In regards to Mormon art and its spiritual commonality, she wrote that this spirituality also encourages aesthetic diversity, stating that "the very personal nature of this spiritual artistic quest prevents the attainment of a prevalent aesthetic."

== Notable Mormon artists ==
- C. C. A. Christensen
- James C. Christensen, American illustrator
- Caitlin Connolly, American painter and sculptor
- Rose Datoc Dall, American painter
- Avard Fairbanks
- Arnold Friberg, American illustrator and painter noted for his religious and patriotic works
- Brian Kershisnik, American painter
- Del Parson
- Walter Rane, American painter and illustrator
- Jorge Cocco Santángelo, painter and professor of art from Argentina
- Liz Lemon Swindle, painter and artist known for her religious paintings
- Minerva Teichert, American painter and muralist
- Stanley J. Watts
- Janis Mars Wunderlich, ceramic artist and professor of art at Monmouth College

== Popular non-Mormon artists used by the LDS Church ==
- Harry Anderson
- Carl Heinrich Bloch
- Heinrich Hofmann

== See also ==
- List of Latter Day Saints: artists
- List of Utah artists
- List of Mormon Cartoonists
- Mormon folklore: Material objects
- Mormon literature
- Mormon music
- Phrenology's impact on Mormon artwork
- Symbolism in The Church of Jesus Christ of Latter-day Saints
