= Church History Museum =

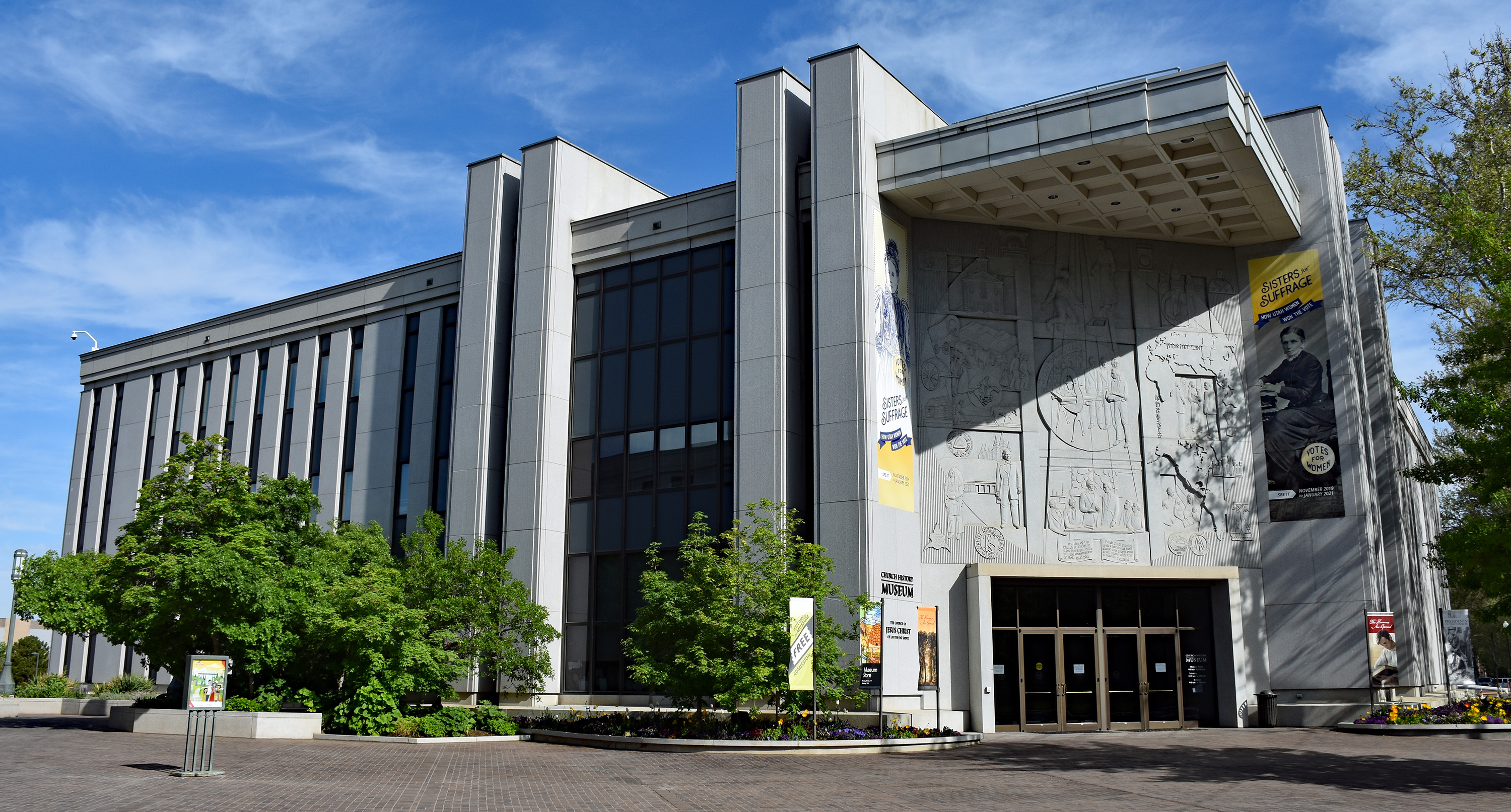
- Established: 1984
- Location: Salt Lake City, Utah, United States
- Coordinates: 40.7708°N 111.8943°W
- Type: History and art museum
- Director: Riley Lorimer
- Website: Church History Museum

The Church History Museum, formerly the Museum of Church History and Art, is the premier museum operated by the Church History Department of the Church of Jesus Christ of Latter-day Saints. It is located in Salt Lake City, Utah, and is opposite the west gates of the church's Temple Square.

The museum has collections of art, artifacts, documents, photographs, tools, clothing and furniture from the almost two-century history of the Church. Outside of the curators, administrative, and other staff, a large volunteer workforce of Latter-day Saints from the surrounding communities conduct tours of the museum's exhibits and put on many of the museum programs. The Church History Museum is open six days a week and admission is free.

== Museum history ==
A major proponent of the creation of the museum was Florence S. Jacobsen, a church curator and a former general president of the Young Women organization of the church. It was dedicated and opened on April 4, 1984. When the museum opened it had 63,500-square-feet of space and early exhibits included the Mormon Panorama, the 22 historic paintings by C. C. A. Christensen about the early Church and the exhibit Paintings and Prints by Contemporary Latter-day Saint Artists. In 2012, the museum was reviewed in The New York Times, "The museum shows how earthly a religion Mormonism is, how practical its actions have been and how intimately connected its history is to the American past. The printing press, the farm, depictions of the ordinary citizens who were the first church members—we see a vision of early American democracy."

In 2013, the museum hosted two exhibits to mark the 100th anniversary of the Boy Scouts of America, featuring 23 paintings by Norman Rockwell. The museum closed in October 2014 for a year-long refurbishment and remodeling of the first-floor exhibits with a renewed emphasis on Jesus Christ and the faith's founder, Joseph Smith. When the museum reopened in September 2015 the improvements and new exhibits included a replica of the Newel K. Whitney Store, the seer stone Joseph Smith purportedly used to produce the Book of Mormon, and a specially constructed 220-degree-view theater that takes viewers into a thicket of trees in upstate New York where Smith claimed a vision of God and Christ. The museum also contains the printing press that produced the first edition of the Book of Mormon in 1830 and a chair that carpenter Brigham Young built before joining the Church through baptism in 1832. In 2020, the Church History Museum and many of the other buildings on Temple Square were closed in response to the coronavirus pandemic.

== International Art Competition ==
In 1987, Richard Oman started the "International Art Competition" at the Church History Museum. The competition is held every 3–4 years for artists worldwide to submit works of art in assorted mediums around specific church and gospel themes. The "11th International Art Competition" held in 2019 included 151 artists from 26 countries chosen from 947 submitted works. A ceremony honoring artists whose works were purchased for the permanent collection or earned awards of merit is held as part of each competition.

== Museum Store ==
The Museum Store was founded along with the museum to support the many exhibits and programs. Over 200 works of reproduced art have been made available to the general public from the Museum's and Church's extensive collections by prominent historical Latter-day Saint artists such as C. C. A. Christensen, John Hafen, and Minerva Teichert, in addition to contemporary Latter-day Saint artists such as Walter Rane, Robert Barrett, and Arnold Friberg. The store also sells historical toys, literature, statuary, and pioneer-era clothing, such as bonnets.

== See also ==
- Mormon art
