= Tantara Records =

- Parent company: Brigham Young University
- Founded: 1993
- Founder: K. Newell Dayley
- Genre: Choral, classical, contemporary, jazz, a capella, world music
- Country of origin: U.S.
- Location: Provo, Utah
- Official website: www.tantararecords.com

Tantara Records is a recording label owned by Brigham Young University (BYU) and operated by the BYU School of Music. The mission of Tantara is to promote the musical works of BYU, both by its various vocal and instrumental ensembles and also the works of its faculty who are musical composers, artists or directors.

Multiple works by the BYU Singers, BYU Concert Choir, BYU Men's Chorus, BYU Women's Chorus, Vocal Point, and Noteworthy have been published by Tantara. Tantara also distributes works by BYU's various bands, orchestras and ensembles. It also operates the Heritage endowment to promote the works of major LDS composers and serves as the distribution arm for the Barlow Endowment.

The senior producer for Tantara Records was Benjamin R. Fales, a 2002 BYU graduate who served as General Manager of BYU Music Group from 2010 to 2025. Zach Collier became the General Manager and Senior Music Producer for BYU Music Group in 2025.

The idea for Tantara Records was developed by K. Newell Dayley, who was then the chair of BYU's School of Music, along the model of the university press. The decision to go through with it was brought about in large part because of the non-standard rates music publishers threatened to charge BYU in the matter of its publication of the album An American Tradition of Folk Hymns.
