= Edvard Schiffauer =

Czech composer of classical music

- Edvard Schiffauer in 2011
- Born: Tomáš Edvard Schiffauer; 26 March 1942 (age 83); Ostrava, Bohemia and Moravia
- Occupations: Composer, professor of composition
- Notable work: Rural Christmas Mass (op.4), Children's opera Vrat' nám, ptáku, Hastermana! (op.5)
- Spouse: Věra Heřmánková
- Children: Jakub, Filip, Sylvie
- Parents: Leopold Schiffauer (father); Marta Dušková (mother)

Tomáš Edvard Schiffauer (born 26 March 1942), more commonly known as Edvard Schiffauer, is a Czech composer of contemporary classical music. Although his oeuvre consists largely of incidental music, along with a significant output in chamber music, ranging from duets to large wind ensemble works often characterized by unorthodox instrumental combinations, he is also recognized for his vocal works, including operas, an oratorio, and a mass.

== Biography ==
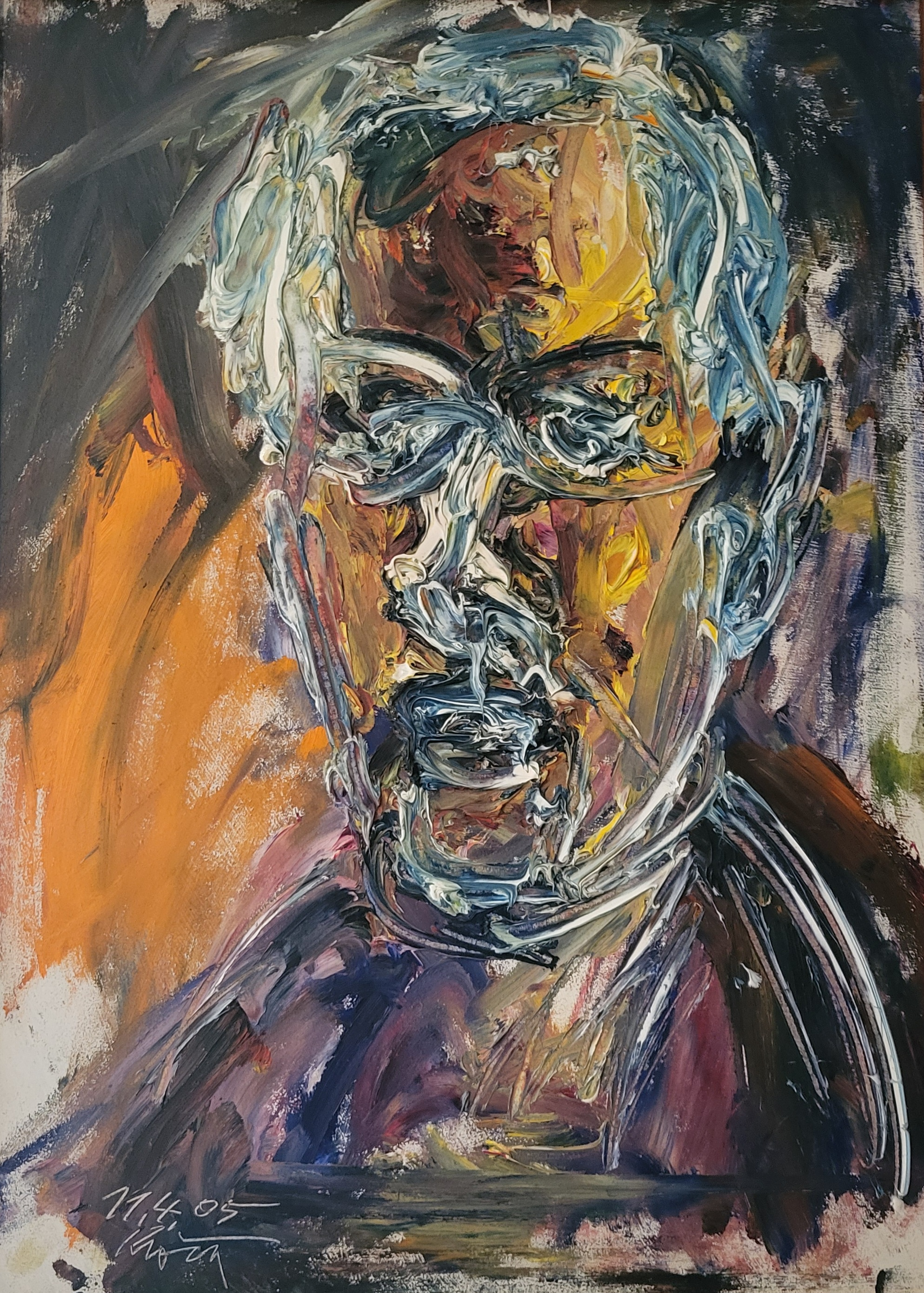
Portrait by Antonín Kroča, 2005

Edvard Schiffauer was born in Ostrava in the Protectorate of Bohemia and Moravia (now the Czech Republic) in an educated upper-middle-class family. However, the family's quality of life degraded after the communist 1948 Czechoslovak coup d'état. In 1960, Schiffauer started his studies at the Technical University of Ostrava, which he discontinued, instead completing his master's degree at the Pedagogical Institute of the University of Ostrava in 1964. He also began studying musical composition in the Academy of Performing Arts in Prague.

In 1961, Schiffauer and other students established the theatre Divadélko Pod okapem (Little Theatre under the Gutter), which became an Ostrava equivalent of the Semafor Theatre, in Prague. Furthermore, he was involved in the foundation of the Divadlo Waterloo (Waterloo Theatre), where his musical Syn Pluku (Son of the Regiment) was performed in 1968. Later, the Waterloo Theatre was banned by authorities in the normalization era in Czechoslovakia, and a large-scale court trial against those involved in the theatre and specifically in this musical's production was held. As a result, Schiffauer was expelled from the Academy of Performing Arts and sentenced to nine months of imprisonment.

He served his sentence in the prison in Plzeň-Bory, where he drafted early versions of his children's opera Vrať nám, ptáku, hastrmana (Bring us Hasterman back, Bird) with author Ivan Binar, his friend and later Charter 77 signatory. Schiffauer was employed as a coal mine worker and was permanently interrogated by the State Security Police throughout the normalization era. This experience was briefly summarized by Schiffauer in an interview published on YouTube in February 2019.

After the Velvet Revolution, Schiffauer was allowed to complete his university education, which he did at the Janáček Academy of Music and Performing Arts, and could fully dedicate his time to musical composition. During his career he taught in the Janáček Conservatory in Ostrava and in the Silesian University in Opava.

== Works ==
| Opus Number | Title | Year | Notes |
|---|---|---|---|
| 1 | Agent 3,14159 | 1969 | Incidental music for the play of the same name.; Premiered on 2 December 1969 in the theatre Waterloo. |
| 2 | Pamphlets | 1969 | Original: Pamflety. Collection of scenic music and songs.; Premiered on 14 January 1969 in the Theatre Waterloo. |
| 3 | Son of the Regiment | 1969 | Original: Syn Pluku.; This satirical musical was the cause of Schiffauer's arrest in 1972.; Premiered 1 April 1969 in the Theatre Waterloo. |
| 4 | Rural Christmas Mass | 1969 | Original: Venkovská Vánoční mše.; Libretto by Ivan Bianr.; One of Schiffauer's best-known compositions.; Included in a CD named Vánoce (Christmas) (also contains op.17 and op.21), released in 1998.; Premiered in the Church of Mokré Lazce by the Kostelní sbor a orchestr v Mokrých Lazcích (Church Choir and Orchestra of the Mokré Lazce).; Also performed in churches of the Czech Republic, Poland, Slovakia, the Netherlands, and Denmark.; This piece was also published on YouTube. Listen to this mass |
| 5 | Bring us Hasterman back, Bird! | 1973 | Original: Vrať nám, ptáku, hastrmana!.; This is an opera for kids.; One of Schiffauer's best-known compositions.; The outline for the opera was drawn with Ivan Binar in the prison of Plzeň-Bory.; Released on a standalone CD titled Vrať nám, ptáku, hastrmana.; This opera was premiered on 4 September 2015 in the Puppet Theatre of Ostrava.; Under the title Zob, Zob, Zoban!, this opera was premiered in the National Moravian-Silesian Theatre (in Antonín Dvořák Theatre), on 24 September 2017. Also, under the name of "Nøkkemannen Lucian", this opera was premiered in Norway in the Ringsaker Opera Theatre, in Ringsaker, on 29 May 2019.Listen to a part of this piece. |
| 6 | Teasings | 1975 | Original: Škádlení.; For three mixed choirs and capella. |
| 7 | Sneers | 1982 | Original: Jízlivosti.; For male voice and harp.; Premiered in 1982 in the Hudební současnost (Musical Contemporaneity) festival, in Ostrava. |
| 8 | Little Evening Entry Fees | 1983 | Original: Malé večerní vstupné.; For French horn quartet. |
| 9 | Sonata for Violin and Guitar | 1984–1985 | – |
| 10 | Zoo Suite | 1984 | Original: Zoologická suita.; For brass quintet.; Premiered in 1985 in the Hudební současnost (Musical Contemporaneity) festival, in Ostrava. |
| 11 | Hymn of Moravia | 1985 | Original: Hymnus Moravy.; For fourteen brass instruments. |
| 12 | Sonatina for French Horn and Guitar | 1985 | – |
| 13 | String Quartet Vzepětí | 1989 | – |
| 14 | Music to Go with White Wine (Best if from a Barrel) | 1992 | Original: Hudba k bílému vínu (Nejlépe sudové).; This composition was published in a CD. |
| 15 | ...and the Flower Remains | 1993 | Original: ...a kytička zůstává.; For flute, cello and piano.; Written while grieving the composer's mother's death. The title refers to Schiffauer's memory of his mother's funeral, at which her coffin was adorned by a flower, the final ornament of her coffin (and thus indeed of her existence) that was perceived by the composer before she was ceremoniously taken away. |
| 16 | Crusade | 1994 | Original: Křížová výprava.; Scenic oratorio buffo. |
| 17 | Christmas Caroling at Home, or Elsewhere | 1994 | Original: Vánoční zpívání doma, i jinde.; For mixed choir.; Collection of carols from all over the world edited by Schiffauer, included in the CD titled Vánoce (Christmas) (also contains op.4 and op.21), released in 1998. |
| 18 | A Hare, a Hare! | 1995 | Original: Zajíc, zajíc!.; Incidental music. |
| 19 | Ondras and Juras, Lord of the Bald Mountain | 1996 | Original: Ondráš a Juráš, Pán Lysé hory.; Tragic opera comedy. |
| 20 | Whispers | 1996 | Original: Šepoty.; For female voice and string trio. |
| 21 | Three Small Christmas Pastorales | 1997 | Original: Tři malé Vánoční pastorely.; For wind octet.; Included in the CD Vánoce (Christmas) (also contains op.4 and op.17) released in 1998. |
| 22 | Clevernesses | 1998 | Original: Chytrosti.; For three female voices and magnetic tape. |
| 23 | Singing about Rusalka | 1998 | Original: Zpívání o Rusalce.; Incidental music. |
| 24 | Czardas for solo tuba | 1999 | – |
| 25 | Prelude and Toccata for Organ, Sinful | 1999 | Original: Hříšná toccata. |
| 26 | Nausikaa | 1999 | Incidental music. |
| 27 | Sonatina for French Horn and Student Orchestra | 1999 | – |
| 28 | Returns | 2000 | Original: Návraty.; For solo bayan. |
| 29 | Escapades on a Folk Song | 2000 | Original: Úlety s lidovou písní.; For female vocal trio, viola and guitar. |
| 30 | Pictures to Vernissage II, Correctly Music to Vernissage II | 2001 | Original: Obrázky k vernisáži II, správně Hudba k vernisáži II.; For harp. |
| 31 | The Scream | 2002 | Original: Výkřik.; For string orchestra. |
| 32 | Fragment of a Neo-Baroque Sonata | 2002 | Original: Fragment neubarokní sonáty.; For string orchestra and violin. |
| 33 | Little Moravian Suite or Moravian Suitek | 2006 | Original: "Moravský Suitek".; For clarinet quartet.; The Suitek is the name of a musical form invented by Schiffauer. The suffix "-ek" indicates a diminutive in Czech. "Suitek" thus roughly translates to "little suite." |
| 34 | Chickens | 2006 | Original: Slépky.; For three flutes, string orchestra, and whip. |
| 35 | A Maid in Trouble | 2008 | Original: Komorná v nesnázích.; For soprano and violin. |
| 36 | Five on Five | 2020 | Original: Za pět na pět.; For cello, piano, and percussion instruments.; A march composed of two movements. |
| 37 | Three-Flute Pele Mele for Fiala the Rabbit | 2021 | Original: Třífletnové pelemele pro králíka Fialu.; For three flutes and various percussion instruments.; Composed of six movements, each corresponding to a chapter of a tale written by Ivan Binar (who also wrote, notably, the libretto for Op. 5), titled Králík Fiala (Fiala the Rabbit).; This piece has been published on YouTube. Listen to this work. |
| 38 | Transatlantic Serenade | 2020-2022 | Original: Serenáda transatlantická.; For solo piano.; Collaborative composition involving Schiffauer as well as his great-nephew Jakub Edward Schiffauer Medraj and his brother Leopold Jiří Schiffauer, whereby each composer wrote a continuation, however long as deemed natural, on material written by another participant prior. This was carried out in 2020–2021, the three composers sending each other their continuations back and forth across the Atlantic Ocean (hence the title) during the COVID-19 pandemic. Later, in 2022, the entirety of the work was revised and molded together by Schiffauer Medraj, filling gaps, rearranging, and adding more coherent transitions as suit a more natural flow of the music. |

=== Unknown dates ===
| Title | Notes |
|---|---|
| But I, I... | Original: Ale já přece....; Dark grotesque opera. |
| Just like Tree Trunks | Original: Jako kmeny stromů.; For symphonic orchestra. |
| Sonata for Solo Cello Jotunheimen | – |
| Moravian Boy on a Crossing in Sydney | Original: Kluk z Moravy na přechodu v Sydney.; For solo piano. |
| About Love with Us | Original: O lásce u nás.; For voice and piano. |
| A Fairytale about Love, Fantasy in three Parts | Original: Pohádka o lásce, fantazie ve třech částech.; This piece appeared in a CD released in 2011 named Czech and Moravian Oboe Music.; Performed on 11 January 2013 by Czech oboist Marlen Vavriková in the Madsen Recital Hall and was assisted by BYU faculty pianist Jeffrey Shumway. |
| Seven Variations for Piano | Original: Sedm variací pro klavír. |
| The Happy Prince | Original: Št'astný princ.; For two female voices, recitation, violin, and guitar.; Music to accompany the recounting of Binar's adaptation of Oscar Wilde's tale "The Happy Prince" from his collection The Happy Prince and Other Tales |
| Monologue from Mrštík brothers' play for solo voice Maryša | Premiered on 13 November 2019 in the Academy of Performing Arts in Prague Gallery. |
| Brenpartija, or Scenes from the Slag Heap | Original: Brenpartija, aneb Scény ze struskové haldy.; Premiered on 26 May 2009 in the Lower Vítkovice.; Also performed on 30 October 2009 in the Komorní Scéna Aréna (Aréna Chamber Theatre). |
