= Nonstop =

Nonstop or non-stop may refer to:

== Computing ==
- NonStop (server computers), a fault-tolerant computer architecture by Tandem Computers (later Compaq, now Hewlett-Packard)
- NonStop SQL, relational database software by Tandem Computers (later Compaq, now Hewlett-Packard)
- UnixWare NonStop Clusters, a fault tolerant computer system sold by SCO

== Film and TV ==
- Non-Stop, a 2013 film starring Lacey Chabert
- Non-Stop (film) (2014), starring Liam Neeson
- Cozi TV, a network of digital subchannels on NBC's owned-and-operated television stations formerly known as NBC Nonstop
- Nonstop (South Korean TV series), a South Korean sitcom, 2000-2006
- Nonstop (Chinese TV series), the Chinese version of the South Korean sitcom, 2009
- Non-Stop, 6-hour-daily live news show on BFMTV

== Music ==
- Nonstop (band), a Portuguese girl band

=== Albums ===
- Nonstop!, James Brown album
- Nonstop (Vocal Point album)
- NonStop (Fun Factory album)
- Non Stop (Julio Iglesias album)
- Non Stop (Reflex album)
- Non-Stop (Andy Bell album)
- Non-Stop (B. T. Express album)
- Nonstop (EP), an EP by Oh My Girl, or the title song
- XXV Nonstop, by Sick of It All

=== Songs ===
- "Nonstop" (song), a song by Drake
- "Non Stop", a song by Exo from the album Obsession
- "Non Stop", a song by Gen Hoshino included on the box set Gen Hoshino Singles Box: Gratitude
- "Non-Stop" (Hamilton song), a song from the musical Hamilton
- "Non-Stop", a song by the Human League from the 1981 single "Open Your Heart"
- "Non stop", a song by Michal David from the album Kroky Františka Janečka
- "Nonstop", an instrumental piano solo by Juan María Solare

== Other uses ==
- Non-Stop (novel), a 1958 science fiction novel by Brian Aldiss
- 24/7 service, a service available at all times
- Non-stop decay, cellular mechanism to prevent translation of mRNA molecules lacking a stop codon
- Non-stop flight, an airplane flight with no intermediate stops
