= Brigham Young University Men's Chorus =

- Choir
- Founded: 1901
- Director: Brent Wells
- Headquarters: Brigham Young University
- Associated groups: BYU Singers BYU Concert Choir BYU Women's Chorus
- Website: menschorus.byu.edu

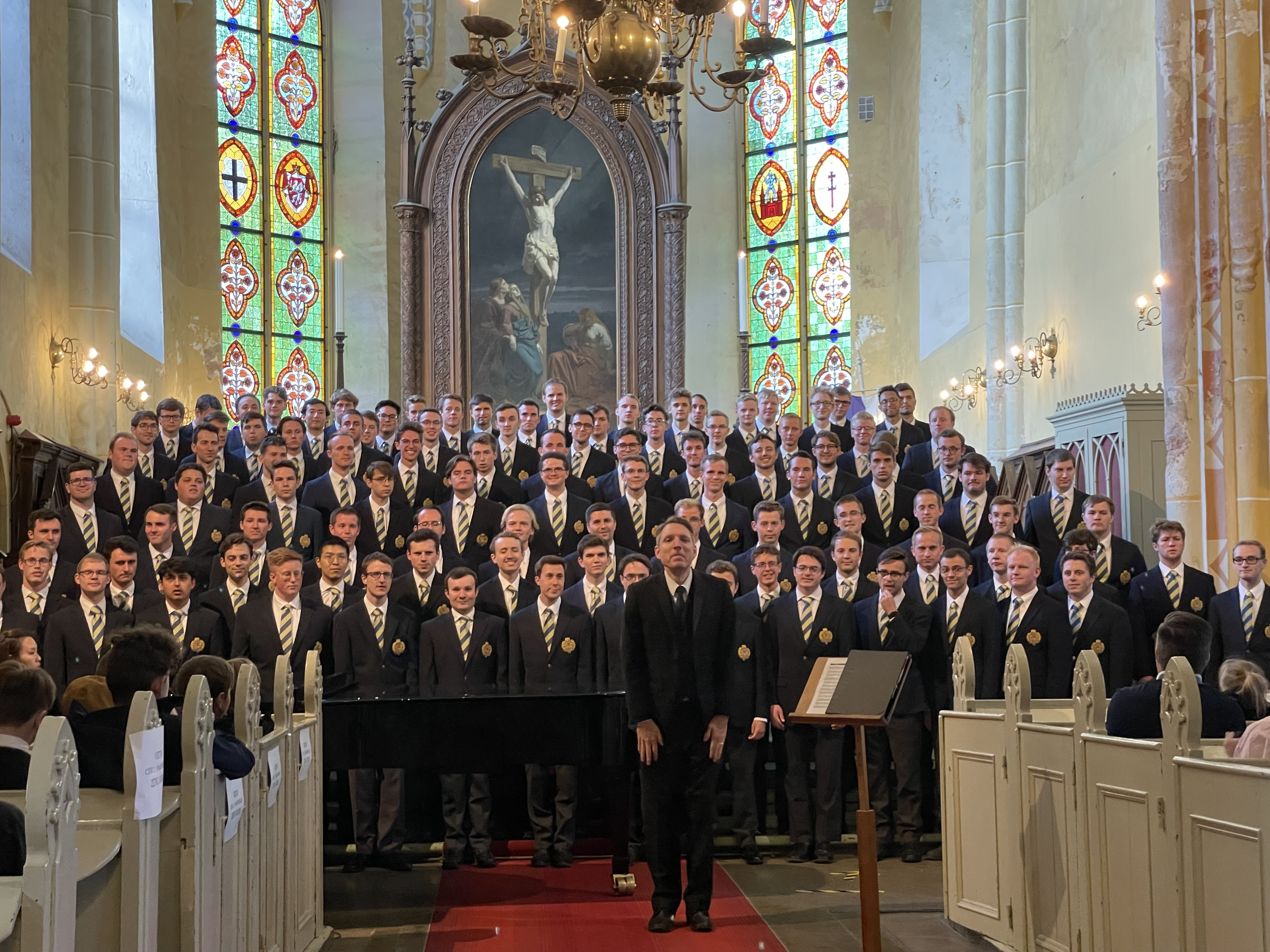
Men's Chorus directed by Dr. Brent Wells in the Baltic States - May 2022

BYU Men's Chorus is the largest collegiate men's choir in the United States. With 180 auditioned members, the choir began more than 100 years ago as a small male glee club.

== History ==
The BYU Men's Chorus began in 1901 as Male Glee. In 1958, it became an official BYU class. In 1984, with Mack Wilberg's appointment as director, the choir had grown to be the largest collegiate male choir in the United States with 180 members. Under Wilberg's direction, the choir was named one of the most outstanding and unique collegiate choirs in the United States by Choral Journal. In 1995, they released their first album entitled Shout with Glory. Two years later, the choir released another album Awake My Soul. After Wilberg retired in 1999, Rosalind Hall replaced him as choir director. In 2005, Men's Chorus released a full-length album Praise Him, followed by a 2013 album entitled Set Apart which was released in response to the Church of Jesus Christ of Latter-day Saints's announcement to lower to age requirement for missionary service. This album was made free to download. In 2020, Hall announced her retirement as director of the Men's Chorus. In August 2020, Brent Wells replaced Hall as Men's Chorus director.

== Discography ==
- Shout with Glory (1995)
- Awake My Soul (1997)
- Praise Him (2005)
- Set Apart (2013)

== See also ==
- Choirs at Brigham Young University
