= BYU Vocal Point =

Male collegiate a cappella group

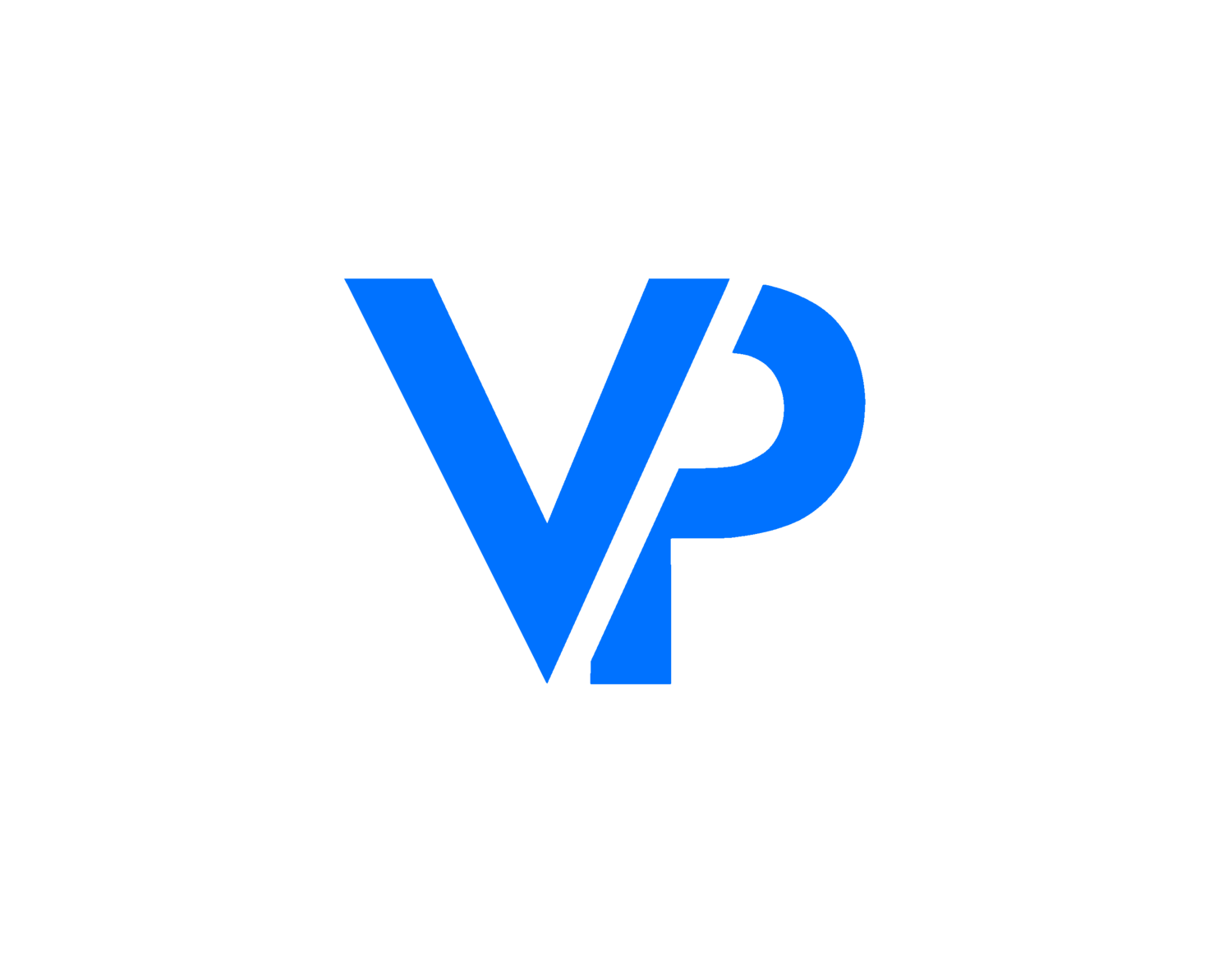
- BYU Vocal Point Logo

Background information
- Origin: Brigham Young University
- Genre: A cappella
- Years active: 1991–present
- Label: BYU Records
- Members: Donovan Blackham Zak Brown Trace Glick Anden Goit Matt Hinck Jensen Underwood Noah Yuvienco
- Past members: Bob Ahlander; Dave Boyce; Rick McFarland; Ryan Innes; Buck Mangum; James Stevens; Jake Hunsaker; Tanner Nilsson; Logan Shelton; Jantzen Dalley; Yaphet Bustos; McKay Crockett; Jensen Diederich & more
- Website: www.byuvocalpoint.com

YouTube information
- Channel: BYU Vocal Point
- Years active: 2011–present
- Genre: Music
- Subscribers: 816 thousand
- Views: 214 million
- Last updated: April, 2026

BYU Vocal Point, or simply Vocal Point, is a seven to nine-member, male a cappella group at Brigham Young University (BYU). Founded by two students, Bob Ahlander & Dave Boyce, in 1991, Vocal Point is under the direction of former member Carson Trautman.

The group has won three Pearl Awards and it was the winner of the 2006 International Championship of Collegiate A Cappella (ICCA). In 2011, the group placed fifth on NBC's third season of The Sing Off.

== History ==
Vocal Point was founded in 1991 by two students at BYU, Dave Boyce and Bob Ahlander. Boyce and Ahlander became introduced to modern a cappella while visiting the Eastern United States, where a cappella had become popular among colleges. Jill Petersen-Lex became the group's first artistic director as the group hoped to introduce the Western United States to contemporary a cappella. The three held auditions in the fall of 1991. Although the group intended to have eight members, a double-quartet, they could not choose between two singers so they accepted both and became a group of nine. In 1992, the group recorded its first album, "If Rocks Could Sing" on cassette. In 1994, Vocal Point was absorbed into BYU's School of Music and Jim Anglesey (1947-2005) was appointed as the group’s next director.

The group won the ICCA semifinals for the 2003–04 and 2004-05 competitions, but the group chose to not participate in the finals in New York, because they took place on Sundays. In 2004, Vocal Point performed eighteen shows in Nauvoo, Illinois, for three weeks at the Joseph Smith Academy Theater. The group's former member James Stevens became the group's director in 2004, directing the group until 2012. In 2006, Vocal Point received three Pearl Awards from the Faith Centered Music Association for "Best Sacred Recorded Song of the Year", "Best Group Recording Artist of the Year", and "Best Performing Artist of the Year" for their album "Standing Room Only".

Vocal Point performed at BYU's Homecoming Spectacular in 2006. The same year, they hosted a reunion concert for Vocal Point's 15th anniversary. Competing in the 2006 ICCA competition, the group was awarded first place in the quarterfinals and semifinals before winning first place at the ICCA finals in the Lincoln Center for the Performing Arts in New York

Directed by the group's former tenor and beatboxer, Buck Mangum, in early 2011, Vocal Point again competed in the ICCA. They placed first at quarter finals in Eugene, Oregon. At the semi-finals in Los Angeles, Vocal Point again placed first. At finals in New York, Vocal Point received awards for "best vocal percussionist" to Tanner Nilsson, again "best soloist" to Jake Hunsaker, and second place in the entire competition. The songs they competed with in their set were Michael Jackson's "Beat It," Michael Bublé's "Meglio Stassera," a Polish hymn entitled "Infant Holy," and Louis Prima's "Jump Jive an' Wail."

In 2011, Vocal Point competed as part of season 3 of NBC's reality TV series, The Sing Off. The members of the group that competed in the show were Michael "Mike" Christensen, McKay Crockett, Keith Evans, Jake Hunsaker, Ben Murphy, Tanner Nilsson, Robert Seely, Tyler Sterling, and Ross Welch. They were accompanied by Stevens. As a result of their participation in the show, the group was featured in a CNN article discussing how the group represented BYU and the Church of Jesus Christ of Latter-day Saints. From 2012 to 2022, the group's former member, McKay Crockett, serve as the group's producer and artistic director. Vocal Point has performed the United States national anthem at Utah Jazz games. On tour in the United States, their concerts frequently sell out. In 2018, Vocal Point won several CASA A Capella Video Awards including Outstanding Collaborative Video and Best Show Tunes/Soundtrack/Theme Song for "Beauty and the Beast A Cappella Medley" featuring Lexi Walker and the award for Best Religious Video for "It Is Well With My Soul".

In 2019, Vocal Point participated in the BYU China Spectacular along with BYU Young Ambassadors and BYU Cougarettes after being approved to travel in 2018. Ever since the approval, they were able to perform in other countries such as Thailand, Philippines, Cuba, Japan, and South Korea. In 2022, they made an all Disney album called Magic: Disney Through Time. They collaborated with many singers to make this album including the voice of Encanto's Dolores, Adassa, Anthem Lights, Laura Osnes, & former member Yaphet Bustos. The same year, they performed at the LDS Church for Vocal Point's 30th anniversary with 62 former members performing with its 2022 members. In late 2022, Carson Trautman became the group's director. In 2023, the group reduced the number of members from nine to seven. In an Instagram story, one of the members Jensen Diederich explained that they reduced to 7 members so they can travel easier.

== Awards ==
- Pearl Award for Best Performing Artist (2005)
- Pearl Award for Best Performing Group (2005)
- ICCA International Champions (2006)
- ICCA Second place (2011)
- Fifth place on NBC's third season of The Sing Off (2011)
- Regional Emmy Award in the Arts/Entertainment - Program/Special Category (2017)

== Discography ==
Discography from 2004 to 2022 was retrieved from BYU Music Store.

Albums:

- If Rocks Could Sing (1992)
- Instruments Not Included (1994)
- Fatter Than Ever (1996)
- Mouthing Off (1999)
- Grand Slam (2003)
- Standing Room Only (2004)
- Nonstop (2008)
- Back In Blue (2011)
- Lead Thou Me On: Hymns and Inspiration (2012)
- Spectrum (2014)
- He Is Born (2015)
- Music Video Hits (Vol. 1) (2016)
- Music Video Hits (Vol. 2) (2018)
- Vocal Point (2020)
- Grace (2021)
- Magic Disney Through Time (2022)
- Creamery on Ninth (2025)

EPs:

- Christmas Under the Stars (Live on BYUtv) (2017)
- Newborn King (2020)
- In Every Thought (2024)

Singles:

- Good Time (2013)
- Brave (2013)
- O Come, O Come, Emmanuel (2013)
- Nearer, My God, to Thee (feat. James Stevens & BYU Men's Choir) (2014)
- I Lived (2015)
- Homeward Bound (2015)
- Drag Me Down / As Long as You Love Me (Mashup) (2015)
- Ultimate A Cappella Mashup: 25 Hits, 25 Years (2016)
- When She Loved Me (2016)
- It Is Well with My Soul (2017)
- Beauty and the Beast Medley (feat. Lexi Walker) (2017)
- You Will Be Found (2017)
- EDM A Cappella Mashup (2017)
- I Stand All Amazed (2017)
- The Greatest Showman A Cappella Mashup (2018)
- You Raise Me Up (2018)
- What Child Is This? (2018)
- Circle Of Life (2019)
- Love Wins (2019)
- Everything About You (2019)
- Be Thou My Vision (2020)
- Dynamite (2021)
- Anyone (2021)
- Brillan rayos de clemencia (2022)
- This Christmas (2023)
- Nearer, My God, to Thee (feat. Peter Hollens) (2023)
- Butter (2024)
- Wicked Medley (feat. Savannah Stevenson) (2024)
- Merry Christmas, Happy Holidays (2024)
- The Prayer (feat. Madilyn Paige) (2025)
- Joyful Joyful (2025)
- The Christmas Song (2025)
- Angels We Have Heard On High (2025)
- I Will Walk With Jesus (feat. Rise Up Children's Choir) (2026)
- Blame It on the Boogie (2026)
- Blue Christmas (feat. Bear Bachmeier) (2026)

== Awards and nominations ==
Year	Award	Category	Nominee(s)	Result	Ref.
2016	Contemporary A Cappella Recording Awards	Best Classical Song	"Homeward Bound" (single)	Nominated	
2016	Contemporary A Cappella Recording Awards	Best Holiday Album	He Is Born	Runner-up	
2016	Contemporary A Cappella Recording Awards	Best Holiday Song	"God Rest Ye Merry, Gentlemen" from He Is Born	Runner-up	
2016	Contemporary A Cappella Recording Awards	Best Religious Album	He Is Born	Won	
2016	Contemporary A Cappella Recording Awards	Best Religious Song	"He Is Born" from He Is Born	Won	
2016	Contemporary A Cappella Recording Awards	Best Male Collegiate Solo	Ryan Innes for "He Is Born" from He Is Born	Won	
2016	Contemporary A Cappella Recording Awards	Best Male Collegiate Song	"Christmas Eve / Sarajevo 12/24" from He Is Born	Nominated	
2017	A Cappella Video Awards (Note: Before 2017, there were no awards related to a cappella music videos. The Contemporary A Cappella Society announced Video Awards for the first time in 2017.)	Outstanding Collaborative Video	"Go the Distance (from Hercules)" ft. The All-American Boys Chorus	Nominated	
2017	A Cappella Video Awards	Outstanding Costume / Makeup	"Ultimate A Cappella Mashup: 25 Hits, 25 Years"	Nominated	
2017	A Cappella Video Awards	Outstanding Video Editing	"I LIVED"	Nominated	
2017	A Cappella Video Awards	Best Musical / Soundtrack Video	"Go the Distance (from Hercules)"	Nominated	
2017	A Cappella Video Awards	Best Male Collegiate Video	"Ultimate A Cappella Mashup: 25 Hits, 25 Years"	Won	
2017	A Cappella Video Awards	Best Male Collegiate Video	"I LIVED"	Nominated	
2018	A Cappella Video Awards	Outstanding Choreography / Staging	"Beauty and the Beast A Cappella Medley" ft. Lexi Walker	Runner-up	
2018	A Cappella Video Awards	Outstanding Collaborative Video	"Beauty and the Beast A Cappella Medley" ft. Lexi Walker and the BYU Ballroom Dance Company	Won	
2018	A Cappella Video Awards	Outstanding Costume / Makeup	"Beauty and the Beast A Cappella Medley" ft. Lexi Walker	Runner-up	
2018	A Cappella Video Awards	Outstanding Video Editing	"Beauty and the Beast A Cappella Medley" ft. Lexi Walker	Nominated	
2018	A Cappella Video Awards	Best Male Collegiate Video	"EDM A Cappella Mashup"	Nominated	
2018	A Cappella Video Awards	Best Electronic / Experimental Video	"EDM A Cappella Mashup"	Nominated	
2018	A Cappella Video Awards	Best Holiday Video	"Carol of the Bells" by Peter Hollens, ft. BYU Vocal Point, One Voice Children's Choir, BYU Men's Chorus	Runner-up	
2018	A Cappella Video Awards	Best Religious Video	"It Is Well with My Soul"	Won	
2018	A Cappella Video Awards	Best Show Tunes / Soundtrack / Theme Song	"Beauty and the Beast A Cappella Medley" ft. Lexi Walker	Won	
2018	A Cappella Video Awards	Best Show Tunes / Soundtrack / Theme Song	"You Will Be Found"	Nominated	
2019	Contemporary A Cappella Recording Awards	Best Show Tunes / Soundtrack / Theme Song	"Beauty and the Beast Medley" from Music Video Hits, Vol. 2	Nominated	
2019	Contemporary A Cappella Recording Awards	Best Male Collegiate Album	Music Video Hits, Vol. 2	Nominated	
2019	Contemporary A Cappella Recording Awards	Best Male Collegiate Solo	Jantzen Dalley and Logan Shelton for "You Will Be Found" from Music Video Hits, Vol. 2	Nominated	
2019	A Cappella Video Awards	Outstanding Choreography / Staging	"The Greatest Showman A Cappella Mashup"	Won	
2019	A Cappella Video Awards	Best Male Collegiate Video	"You Raise Me Up"	Nominated	
2019	A Cappella Video Awards	Best Show Tunes / Soundtrack / Theme Song Video	"The Greatest Showman A Cappella Mashup"	Won	
2020	A Cappella Video Awards	Best Male Collegiate Video	"Circle Of Life"	Won	
2020	A Cappella Video Awards	Best Holiday Video	"What Child Is This?"	Runner-up	
2020	A Cappella Video Awards	Best Religious Video	"What Child Is This?"	Won	
2020	A Cappella Video Awards	Best Show Tunes / Soundtrack / Theme Song Video	"Circle Of Life"	Won	
2021	Contemporary A Cappella Recording Awards	Best Holiday Song	"All Is Well"	Nominated	
2021	Contemporary A Cappella Recording Awards	Best Religious Song	"Be Thou My Vision"	Won	
2021	Contemporary A Cappella Recording Awards	Best Show Tunes / Soundtrack / Theme Song	"Believe (Polar Express Medley)"	Nominated	
2021	Contemporary A Cappella Recording Awards	Best Professional Arrangement for a Scholastic Group	Abner Apsley: "High Hopes"	Nominated	
2021	Contemporary A Cappella Recording Awards	Best Lower Voices Collegiate Album	Vocal Point	Won	
2022	Contemporary A Cappella Recording Awards	Best Lower Voices Collegiate Song	"Dynamite"	Nominated	
2022	A Cappella Video Awards	Best Classical / Traditional Video	"Amazing Grace"	Won	
2022	A Cappella Video Awards	Best Holiday Video	"Believe (Polar Express Medley)"	Runner-up	
2022	A Cappella Video Awards	Best Religious Video	"Amazing Grace"	Won	
2022	A Cappella Video Awards	Best Show Tunes / Soundtrack / Theme Song Video	"Tarzan at the Museum"	Won	
2022	A Cappella Video Awards	Best Lower Voices Collegiate Video	"Tarzan at the Museum"	Won	
2022	A Cappella Video Awards	Outstanding Choreography / Staging	"Believe (Polar Express Medley)"	Won	
2022	A Cappella Video Awards	Outstanding Collaborative Video	"Believe (Polar Express Medley)"	Won	
2022	A Cappella Video Awards	Outstanding Costume / Makeup	"Believe (Polar Express Medley)"	Won	
2023	A Cappella Video Awards	Outstanding Collaborative Video	"We Don’t Talk About Bruno" ft. Adassa & One Voice Children's Choir	Won	
2023	A Cappella Video Awards	Best Show Tunes / Soundtrack / Theme Song	"We Don’t Talk About Bruno" ft. Adassa & One Voice Children's Choir	Won	
2025	Contemporary A Cappella Recording Awards	Best Religious Album or EP	"In Every Thought"	Runner-up	
2025	Contemporary A Cappella Recording Awards	Best Religious Song	"Trenches" from In Every Thought	Won	
2025	Contemporary A Cappella Recording Awards	Best Lower Voices Collegiate Album or EP	"In Every Thought"	Nominated	
2025	Contemporary A Cappella Recording Awards	Best Lower Voices Collegiate Lead Vocal	"My Light"	Nominated	
2025	Contemporary A Cappella Recording Awards	Best Lower Voices Collegiate Song	"Gratitude"	Nominated	
2025	A Cappella Video Awards	Outstanding Choreography / Staging	"Butter"	Won	
2025	A Cappella Video Awards	Best Lower Voices Collegiate Video	"Butter"	Won	
2025	A Cappella Video Awards	Best Holiday Video	"This Christmas"	Nominated	
2025	A Cappella Video Awards	Best Pop Video	"Butter"	Won	
2025	A Cappella Video Awards	Best Religious Video	"Gratitude"	Won	
2026	A Cappella Video Awards	Outstanding Choreography / Staging	"Wicked Medley" ft. Savannah Stevenson	Runner-up	
2026	A Cappella Video Awards	Outstanding Collaborative Video	"Wicked Medley" ft. Savannah Stevenson	Won	
2026	A Cappella Video Awards	Outstanding Costume / Makeup	"Merry Christmas, Happy Holidays"	Nominated	
2026	A Cappella Video Awards	Outstanding Video Editing	"Wicked Medley" ft. Savannah Stevenson	Nominated	
2026	A Cappella Video Awards	Best Collegiate Video	"Merry Christmas, Happy Holidays"	Nominated	
2026	A Cappella Video Awards	Best Holiday Video	"Merry Christmas, Happy Holidays"	Won	
2026	A Cappella Video Awards	Best Religious Video	"The Prayer" ft. Madilyn Paige	Nominated	
2026	A Cappella Video Awards	Best Soundtrack / Theme Song Video	"Wicked Medley" ft. Savannah Stevenson	Runner-up	

== See also ==
- List of collegiate a cappella groups in the United States
- Noteworthy (vocal group), the all female BYU a cappella group
