= Florence Jepperson Madsen =

American music professor (1886–1977)

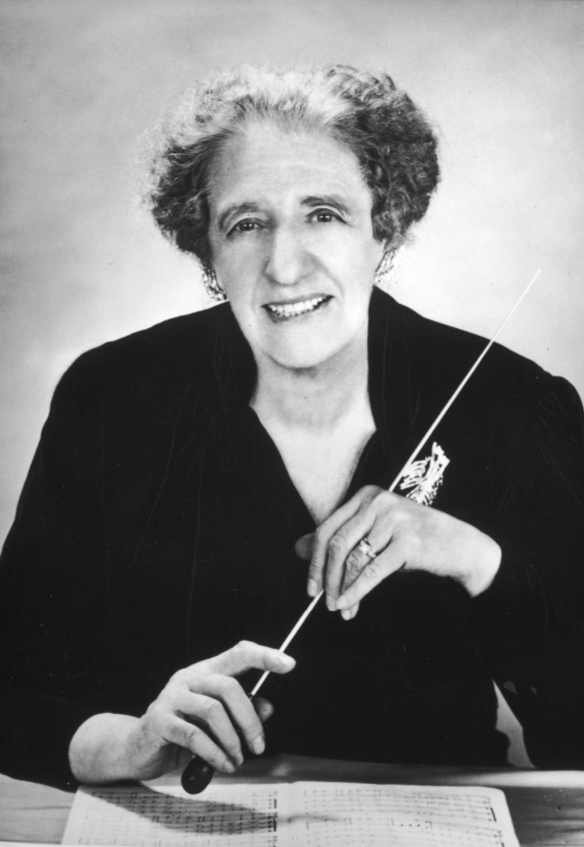
- Born: Florence Jepperson; December 15, 1886; Provo, Utah, U.S.
- Died: April 8, 1977 (aged 90); Provo, Utah, U.S.
- Burial place: Provo City Cemetery
- Education: Brigham Young Academy; New England Conservatory of Music; Chicago Musical College
- Occupations: Professor of Music; Vocal Instructor; Choir Director
- Spouse: H. Franklin Madsen (m. 1922; died 1971)
- Children: 3 (adopted)

Florence Jepperson Madsen (December 15, 1886 – April 8, 1977) was an American contralto singer, vocal instructor, and professor of music. She served as the head of the music department of Brigham Young University (BYU) for ten years.

She was born in Provo, Utah into an artistically-inclined family, learning to sing and play instruments at a young age. After receiving a degree in music from Brigham Young University, Madsen lived in Boston, Massachusetts, for many years, attending the New England Conservatory of Music, receiving private vocal lessons, teaching music, and performing at various prestigious venues.

She accepted an offer to teach at BYU, soon began directing choirs herself, and was then selected as the head of BYU's Department of Music and had a lasting influence upon the institution; she directed multiple music programs, helped establish new choirs, and wrote articles asserting the value of music. Madsen received a master's degree in music from the Chicago Musical College, as well as honorary doctorate degrees from the Chicago and Boguslawski colleges of music.

In 1941, she was appointed a member of the General Board of the Relief Society, the women's organization of the Church of Jesus Christ of Latter-day Saints. Her responsibilities included overseeing the development of new music for the Relief Society, traveling to visit local chapters of the organization, and directing women's choirs such as the "Singing Mothers." Madsen was also a composer, and created more than 100 musical arrangements during her lifetime. In 1952, she was made a professor emeritus after 44 total years at BYU. She died in 1977 at the age of 90. As of 2021 a recital room in the Harris Fine Arts Center on BYU's campus bears her name.

== Early life ==
Madsen was born on December 15, 1886, to Samuel H. Jepperson and Minnie Johnson Jepperson in Provo, Utah. Her grandparents were Danish immigrants to the United States who crossed the Great Plains with other Mormon pioneers. Her father was a musician and made a career constructing and repairing instruments. Her mother was among the first students to enroll in Brigham Young Academy. The Jepperson home was centered around music. At a young age, Florence Madsen took an interest in learning the organ. She would play the instrument "before she was tall enough to see the keyboard" and sing simultaneously. She also learned to play the piano and guitar. Making music together was a frequent Jepperson family pastime. Madsen often sang alongside her mother and sister Marguerite. She had five siblings: brothers Parley, Samuel J., and Walter, and sisters Annie and Marguerite. By the age of eight, Madsen was volunteering as the organist for her local church congregation. She suffered from spinal meningitis as a twelve-year-old, but fully recovered.

In addition to singing with her family members, Madsen formed a trio group with her friends. She also joined her brother Sam's mandolin and guitar club. Her grade school teachers inspired her to pursue music; and, at the age of thirteen, she was chosen to be the contralto soloist at the Provo Tabernacle. At the age of sixteen, she began working as an assistant music teacher at various schools in Provo. In high school, Madsen earned a special certificate in vocal music. She also took voice lessons from Anthony C. Lund, a professor at Brigham Young Academy (BYA). She enrolled in BYA in 1902, and the Academy changed its name to Brigham Young University while she was a student. Lund and Alice Louise Reynolds were Madsen's two greatest influences during her schooling. She later taught a course on hymnology alongside Reynolds. She graduated from BYA's music school in 1905. The following year, she moved to Boston, Massachusetts to attend the New England Conservatory of Music. It was here that her singing career began.

== Music career ==
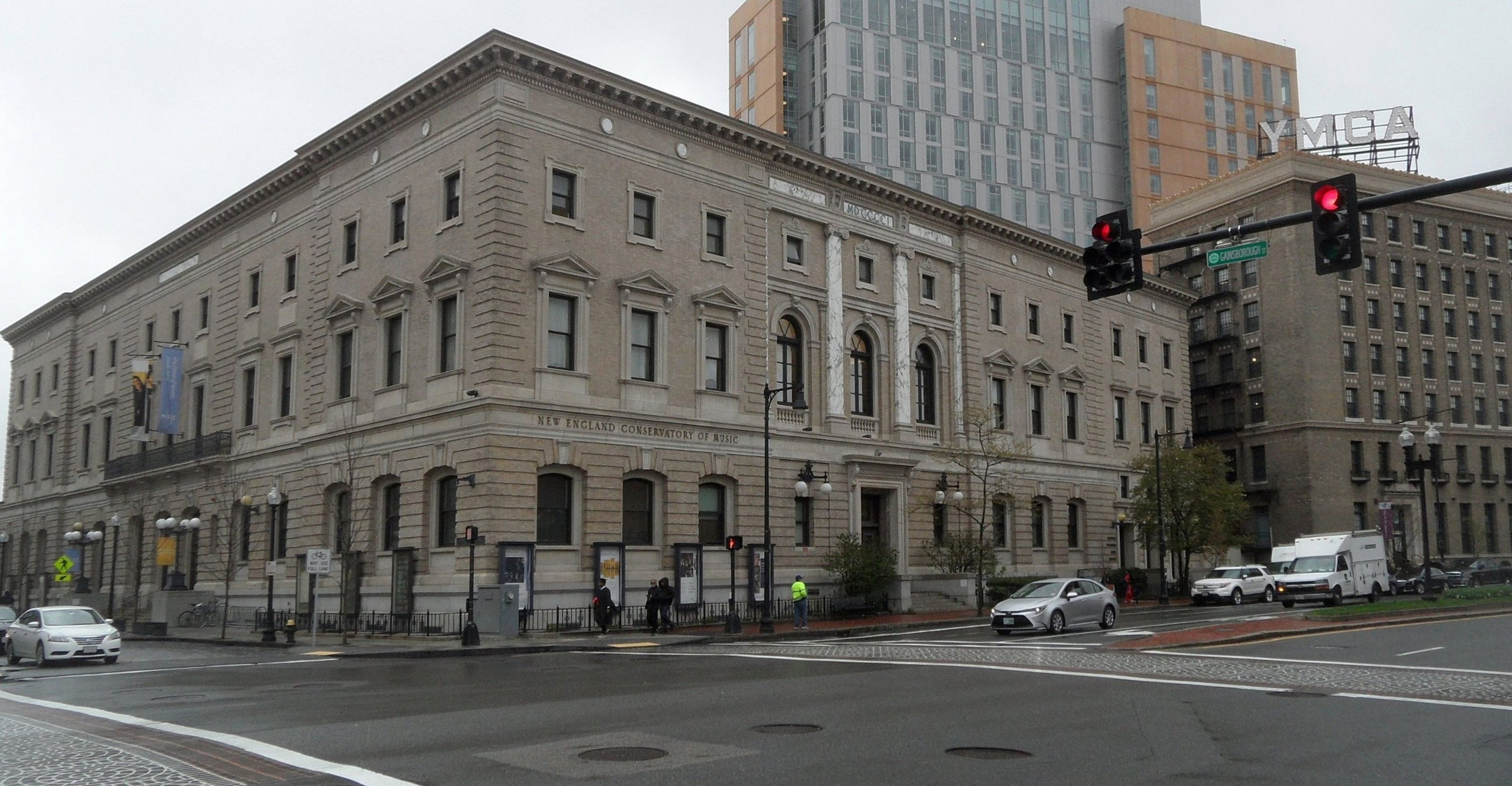
The New England Conservatory of Music in Boston, Massachusetts, where Madsen studied from 1906 to 1909

=== Boston years ===
While a student in Boston, Madsen supported herself by singing at various venues and teaching. She had a happy home life, and would come home to spend her school breaks with her family. Her music career blossomed on the East Coast; renowned opera baritone David Bispham heard her perform at the New England Conservatory in May 1909, and enthusiastically encouraged her to continue singing. Madsen sang at various prestigious venues while studying in Boston. On June 22, 1909, Madsen graduated from the Conservatory with "high honors." The following year, she returned to Utah to take care of her sick mother. When her mother's health stabilized in 1911, Madsen returned to Boston and was hired as a vocal teacher at Lasell Seminary, where she remained for five years. During this time, Madsen also maintained her own studio in Boston for providing private vocal lessons. She also took a music course from Emil Mollenhauer, and soon sang the contralto part in The Messiah at Symphony Hall in Boston under Mollenhauer's direction. She visited New York City in December 1911, singing before various symphony directors. Many of these praised her voice. Madsen sang pieces by English, American, French, German, Scandinavian, Italian, and Russian composers. A few of her favorite works to sing were Bach's Passions, Saint-Saëns's Samson and Delilah, and Rossini's Stabat Mater. She felt that the highest function of music was to praise God. Her time on the east coast was spent serving an unofficial LDS mission; she assisted in sharing her faith via her musical talents whenever the local missionaries requested her help. For example, she performed at a small concert held to convince the owner of the Cumorah property (a hill in Palmyra, New York) of the place's historical significance to the Latter-day Saint movement.

=== Teaching, performing, and directing ===
After seven years in Boston, Madsen moved back to Provo to teach at what by then had become Brigham Young University (BYU). Her time at BYU began with giving private vocal lessons to music students. She also taught at the Latter-day Saint School of Music and sang with the Tabernacle Choir from time to time. In 1917, she organized the Provo Choral Society. During her breaks from teaching, she would travel back to Boston to study and perform. After a few years at BYU, Madsen lived for a brief time in New York City, singing in famous churches and studying under opera manager Herbert Witherspoon. She was described as having a "rich contralto voice." In January 1921, she sang for the Salt Lake Oratorio Society. Later in her life, Madsen directed the choir that sang at the dedication of the Hyde Park Chapel; she was applauded for her work in blending together the voices of people from the U.S., England, Scotland, Wales, and Ireland into one cohesive sound. She performed as a vocalist for a total of fourteen years before becoming a full-time professor of music.

== Personal life ==
Madsen spent the 1918 Spanish Flu pandemic in Utah Valley's quarantine. Her brother Parley died of influenza in 1920. She returned home from New York at this time to tend to her sister Marguerite's double pneumonia diagnosis and her brother's funeral. After growing up in an artistically inclined family, Madsen took up painting as a hobby during her adult years. She later hung many of her brother Parley's paintings on the walls of her office in the College Building on Brigham Young University's campus.

While living in Boston, Madsen had met a woman named Virtue Cook Gilchrist, whom she'd befriended, along with Gilchrist's three daughters. After Gilchrist's husband died, Madsen promised her friend that she would look after the girls if anything happened to Gilchrist. Then, on February 28, 1922, Madsen received word that Cook had died of pneumonia. Her daughters—ages nine, seven, and five—had been orphaned. Madsen's promise to Gilchrist turned into a legal battle; by the time Madsen arrived in Boston, another woman had assumed custody of Gilchrist's daughters, and she opposed their being relocated to Utah's "Mormon environment." During the court case, Madsen battled both anti-Mormon opinion and concerns over her being a single woman. Testimonies from her former vocal instructors, as well as a character witness from U.S. Senator Reed Smoot, helped Madsen win the case. Also influencing the court's decision was Madsen's promise that she would marry soon after returning to Utah and raise the girls in a household with a father figure.

Madsen kept her word, marrying Franklin Madsen on August 30, 1922 in the Salt Lake Temple. Franklin had first met Florence Madsen as one of her vocal students during the summer of 1914. He then spent some time in Boston as a student at the New England Conservatory, and continued taking voice lessons from Madsen. Her tutoring helped him go on to become a singer in the Tabernacle Choir. In the early part of the year 1920, Franklin came to BYU to teach, and the two began to spend more time together. He decided to propose to Madsen after her custody court case. He supported her in her musical endeavors; her career was very important to him. "Together," writes author Grace H. C. Christensen, "they have earned the highest educational honors and recognition in the music world." They adopted and raised Marion, Ruth, and Georgia Gilchrist. Each of the girls possessed musical talent, specifically with the violin, piano, and cello. The family would attend operas together in their free time.

== Head of the Brigham Young University Department of Music ==
George H. Brimhall selected Madsen to be the head of Brigham Young University's music department, a role she held for ten years. She began her work in this capacity by directing multiple singing groups—including BYU Women's Chorus and BYU's glee club—and providing private vocal lessons. She directed the department's performance of the opera Priscilla in May 1921. Madsen set multiple goals for improving the music department, and it most definitely grew under her influence. Some of her efforts "became established traditions" at BYU. She and her husband Dr. Franklin Madsen organized an a cappella choir. As head of the Department of Music, Madsen directed multiple musicals and oratorios and began to compose her own music. She also delivered speeches and wrote articles on the power of music, such as a piece for the Deseret News published in July 1937. At the outbreak of World War II, Florence and Franklin Madsen focused their efforts on providing music to comfort souls in a changing world environment.

== Further education in Chicago ==
In June 1925, the Madsens decided to leave Provo and relocate to Chicago, Illinois to attend the Chicago Musical College. They'd chosen to attend the school both because of its being accredited and also for its balance of musical and traditional education. Both Franklin and Florence studied under Herbert Witherspoon, who had been Madsen's vocal instructor previously, in Boston. In addition to these private lessons, they took courses in composition, accompaniment, and philosophy. While attending school in Chicago, Madsen traveled back to Boston to sing with the Boston Symphony Orchestra. In 1927, Madsen received her Master of Music degree from the Chicago Musical College. Thereafter until 1942, the Madsens returned to Chicago every summer to teach at the college's Master Summer School. This involved instructing students seeking to become directors or music teachers. Additionally, Madsen received an Honorary Doctor of Music degree from the Chicago College of Music (a separate entity from the Chicago Musical College) in August 1934. The Boguslawski College of Music also awarded her an Honorary Doctorate of Music.

== Relief Society service ==
Florence Madsen was appointed a member of the Relief Society General Board in August 1941. She was called specifically to oversee the organization's musical efforts. Her main responsibility included "suggesting choral repertoire and music techniques for approximately 2,564 choral groups, with a total membership of about 38,896 singers." She directed groups from Utah and Idaho to sing in more than thirty-eight sessions of the General Conference of the LDS Church. She also directed choirs from Hawaii, Canada, and the UK. She planned the musical program for the Relief Society centennial celebration, slotted for March 17, 1942; however, the project was cancelled months before, due to the outbreak of the World War II.

Alongside Belle S. Spafford, president of the Relief Society at the time, Madsen traveled around the U.S., attending conventions in various cities, such as the National Council of Women of the United States in New York City. She also traveled to Denver, Colorado; Lethbridge, Alberta, Canada; multiple cities along the East Coast, and the Hawaiian Islands. Madsen's Relief Society contributions also included the creation of musical compositions and instructional materials pertaining to directing and singing.

=== The "Singing Mothers" ===
Madsen was also in charge of the Singing Mothers, a rotating choir that performed at the twice-yearly Relief Society conferences. The term "Singing Mothers" also referred to local choirs, small and large, within ward and stake Relief Societies. Different groups were invited biannually to perform at the conferences. For years, Madsen directed a group of more than 500 Singing Mothers for each October conference. She strived to give each group at least forty-two hours of vocal training before their performance. Various members of the Relief Society made sacrifices of time and money to travel long distances and train under Florence Madsen. On multiple occasions, she was praised for being able to direct such large groups of women with varying vocal ranges. A poem published in the Relief Society Magazine thanked her for her work; and Herbert B. Maw, the governor of Utah at the time, wrote her a letter praising the Singing Mothers' performance. Under Madsen's direction, the Singing Mothers performed at the 1951 convention of the National Federation of Music Clubs. She also directed a choir for the Wide Wide World telecast on January 6, 1957, and received praise from viewers. She strongly believed that everyone, provided the proper training, could sing. Her motto was: "Every Mother a Singing Mother." Madsen and the Singing Mothers "had tremendous influence in raising [the] standards of music in the church."

== Compositions ==
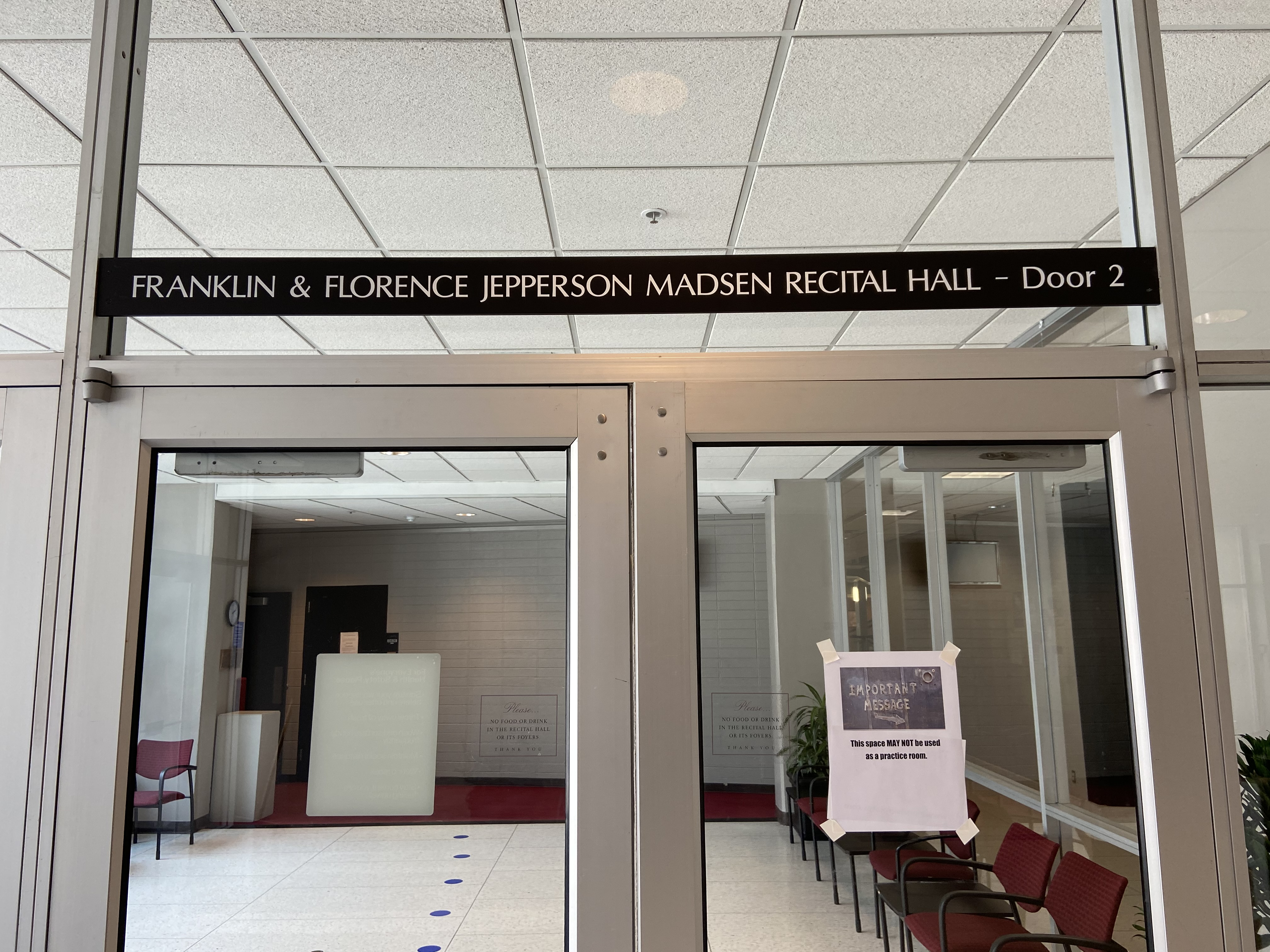
Entrance to the Franklin & Florence Jepperson Madsen Recital Hall in the Harris Fine Arts Center on BYU campus

Madsen also served on the church's General Music Committee. Her particular assignment in this capacity was to compose hymns for women's voices alone. Forty-one of her compositions were featured in the LDS hymnal, and she composed over 100 songs during her lifetime. Madsen focused her composing efforts on creating music for LDS church services. She, her husband, Franklin, and sister Marguerite wrote the lyrics for her works. Both her published and unpublished works range from simple songs written only for women's voices to complex compositions involving as many as eight parts. Three of Madsen's compositions were published in April 1935 by a Boston company. In the fall of that same year, she traveled to Los Angeles to take a break from BYU and focus her efforts on composing.

According to The Springville Herald she was called "one of the outstanding composers of the state [of Utah]" by "having won national reputation for her compositions." In 1945, Madsen was honored by the Provo Women's Council for her compositions. She was appointed a member of the Music Committee of the National Council of Women of the United States. Frank W. Asper, organist at the Salt Lake Tabernacle, wrote that, "as a composer, she ranks at the top". Of her compositions, her biographer Grace Hildy Croft Christenson wrote: "She has written music capable of expressing love, pleasure, despair, resignation, pain, sympathy, hope, uplift, strength, virility, and praise".

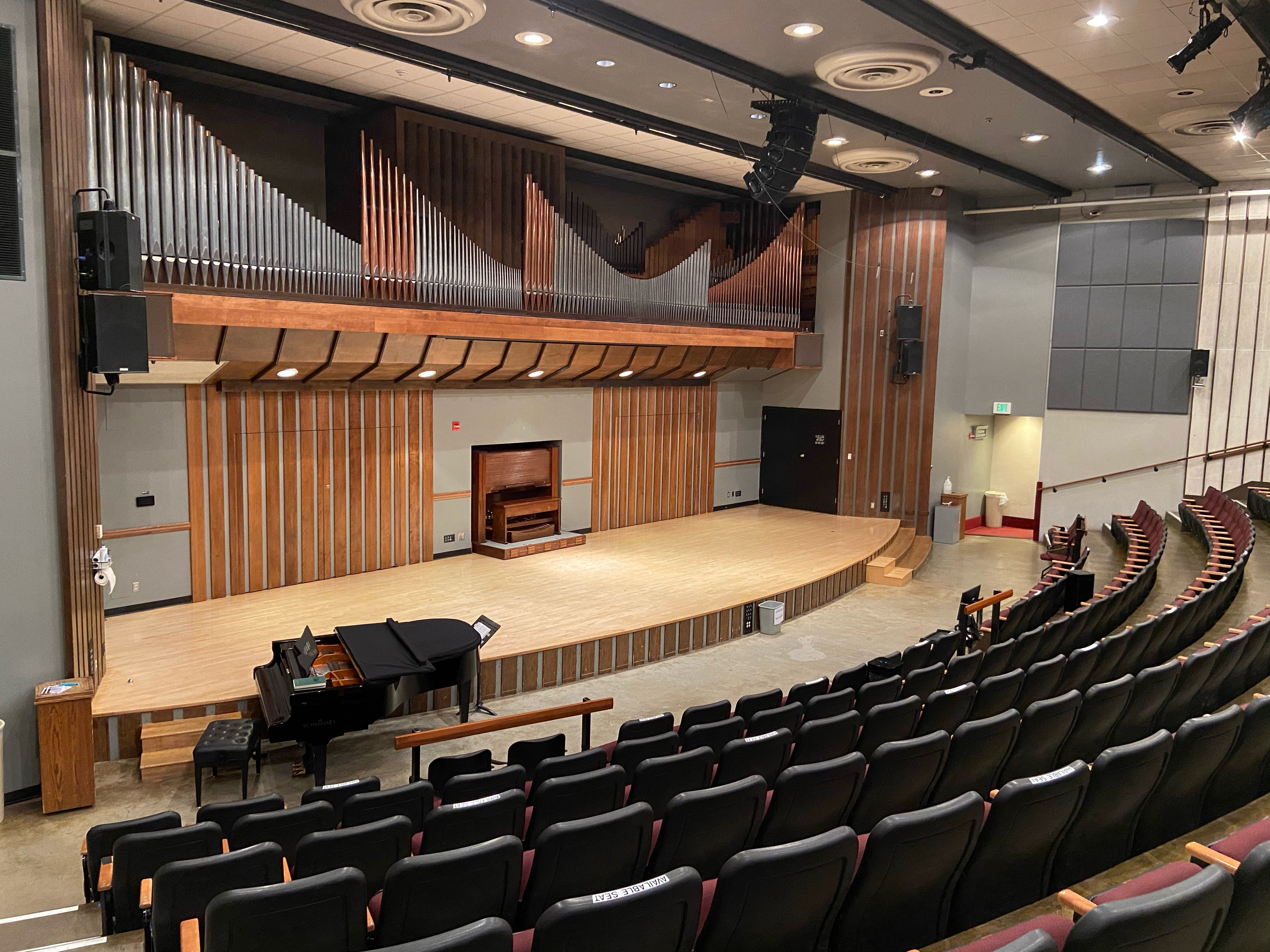
Interior of the Madsen Recital Hall

== Legacy ==
On April 8, 1977, Florence Madsen died at the age of 90. In 1952, she was made professor emeritus after 37 consecutive years of teaching at BYU. She had been a faculty member for a total of 44 years. She had worked with five university presidents: George H. Brimhall, Franklin S. Harris, Christen Jensen, Howard S. McDonald, and Ernest L. Wilkinson. She was one of the recipients of T. Earl Pardoe's 1952 certificates of recognition for "outstanding service to humanity, the nation, state, community, the University, or the Church." She was also awarded the Brigham Young University Alumni Association Distinguished Service Award in 1952 and the David O. McKay Humanities Award for Distinguished Service in 1961. At the Harris Fine Arts Center on BYU campus, a recital room was named after Franklin and Florence Madsen. She is buried in the Provo City Cemetery.

== Selected discography ==
Published Compositions
Title	Date Published	Lyricist/Scripture References
Indian Love Lament (Little White Dove)	1935	Marguerite Jepperson
My Soul is Athirst for God	1936	Psalms 42:2–3
Oh, May I Know the Lord as Friend (My Desire)	1938	George H. Brimhall
Go Ye Forth with My Word	1939	Doctrine and Covenants 84:87–89
In Thy Form	1941	Carlton Culmsee
O Father, Keep Us We Pray	1941	Florence Jepperson Madsen
Sing, Glad Heart	1946	Vilate Raile
Build, Thou, for Life's Immortal Goal	1948	Florence Jepperson Madsen and Franklin Madsen
If Ye Love Me, Keep My Commandments	1950	John 14:5–7, 15–18
Still, Still with Thee	1955	Harriet Beecher Stowe
Thy Blessing on This House, Dear Lord	1956	Alberta Huish Christensen
O, Lovely Land, America	1958	Alberta Huish Christensen

Unpublished Compositions
Title	Lyricist/Scripture References
Love's Overtone	Marguerite Jepperson
Love's Garden	Florence Jepperson Madsen
Song of the Morn	Marguerite Jepperson
The Lovely Spring Is Here	Florence Jepperson Madsen
I Know Thee Who Hast Kept My Path	Robert Browning
The Lord Bless Thee and Keep Thee	Numbers 5:24–26
Come Unto Me	Matthew 11:28
Rose So Tender	Florence Jepperson Madsen
Our Savior's Birth	Florence Jepperson Madsen and Franklin Madsen
Father in Heaven	Hibbard
