= Noteworthy (vocal group) =

American all-female a cappella group

BYU Noteworthy
- BYU Noteworthy Logo

Background information
- Origin: Brigham Young University, Provo, Utah, United States
- Genres: A cappella
- Years active: 2003–present
- Members: Addi Call; Lydia Evans; Savannah Glick; Ally Johnston; Kalea Marler; Aubrie Putnam; Lena Suckow
- Website: pam.byu.edu/group/noteworthy/

BYU Noteworthy is a seven to nine-member, female Brigham Young University (BYU) a cappella group, based in Provo, Utah, United States. They won 1st place at the International Championship of Collegiate A Cappella (ICCA) in 2007 and appeared on the first season of NBC's a cappella competition reality show The Sing-Off in 2009. Esther Yoder formed the group in 2003, aided by members of BYU's Vocal Point. Noteworthy began operating under the direction of the Performing Arts Management (PAM) at BYU in 2014. One of their most popular music videos is a cover of Amazing Grace, which won the Contemporary A Cappella Society (CARA) award for Best Religious Video and has garnered millions of views on YouTube since its release. Noteworthy has released six albums since its formation in 2003. In 2018, Noteworthy performed "Come Thou Fount of Every Blessing" for a Mormon Message for the Church of Jesus Christ of Latter-day Saints (LDS Church).

A former member of Noteworthy, Amy Whitcomb, appeared on the fourth season of The Voice; she was eliminated in the knockout rounds.

== History ==
Noteworthy was founded in 2003 by BYU student Esther Yoder. She consulted with co-founder and then-director of Vocal Point, Bob Ahlander, and recruited Vocal Point members Dave Brown and Dan Dunn to help create the new group. The group was established with nine female members in 2004. Noteworthy competed in the ICCA in 2004. In the semifinal round, Noteworthy placed second in the West region, and Yoder received the award for Most Outstanding Vocal Percussion, the first woman to receive the award. In 2006, the group released its debut album, On the Horizon. They again competed at the ICCA and placed second to Vocal Point in the Quarterfinal round. Noteworthy member Camille Hancock won the award for Most Outstanding Choreography. A Bulgarian track on the album, "Kaval Sviri," was nominated for a CARA Recording Award in the best female collegiate song category.

In 2007, Noteworthy took first place in the Quarterfinals, Semifinals, and the Final round of the competition at the Lincoln Center in New York City, making them the 2007 International Champions. Director Catherine Papworth received the Most Outstanding Arrangement Award for "How Great Thou Art" in both the Quarterfinal and Semifinal rounds. Member Kristin Papworth received the award for Most Outstanding Choreography for Noteworthy's full set in the Finals round. The group's second album Green Means Go was released in 2009. "Listen," a cover track from Green Means Go was selected to appear on the Best of Collegiate A Cappella (BOCA) compilation for 2010. In 2009, Noteworthy appeared on NBC's a cappella competition reality show The Sing-Off. The show debuted on NBC on December 14, 2009. Noteworthy was eliminated in the second episode on December 15, 2009.

After performing on The Sing-Off, Noteworthy went on to compete in the ICCA quarter finals in Eugene, Oregon, where they took first place and the award for Outstanding Choreography, Outstanding Soloist, Outstanding Arrangement, and Outstanding Vocal Percussion. Noteworthy's third album Defined was released in 2010. The CD received four CARA nominations, Best Scholastic Original Song, Best Female Collegiate Album, Best Female Collegiate Solo, and Best Female Collegiate Arrangement. In 2012, Noteworthy performed in two joint concerts with the Whiffenpoofs of Yale while the ensemble was on tour in Utah. The same year, Noteworthy competed in the ICCA, taking first place at the Quarterfinal. Former members Amy Whitcomb and Laina Walker were featured on the third season of NBC's TV Show The Sing-Off with a group called Delilah. Additionally, Whitcomb appeared on the fourth season of The Voice, where she was eliminated in the knockout rounds. In 2013, Noteworthy made its first YouTube music video.

In 2014, Noteworthy released a new album, "Unbound". On April 12, 2014, alumni traveled to Provo for a 10-Year Anniversary Concert, which included performances by the current Noteworthy group as well as past generations. In 2014, the group performed as an opener for Home Free, the Season 4 winning group of NBC's "The Sing-Off," on Memorial Day in Orem, Utah. In 2014, Noteworthy joined Vocal Point as the second university-sponsored a cappella group at BYU, under the administrative direction of BYU's PAM. Keith Evans, a former member of Vocal Point, was hired as the artistic director.

In 2015, Noteworthy gained significant popularity after recording and filming their cover of Amazing Grace, which has garnered millions of views since its release. Noteworthy's "Amazing Grace" won The Contemporary A Cappella Society award for Best Religious Video. They recorded two other music videos that year--"Star Wars: A Cappella Strikes Back" (a medley of Star Wars tunes) and "Be Thou My Vision". Noteworthy returned to compete in the ICCA, winning the Northwest Regional Round (with Sarah Cunha taking the award for Outstanding Vocal Percussion) but was unable to advance due to a scheduling conflict. Touring opportunities took them to the Four Corners to perform on The Today Show with Al Roker, opening for Jay Leno at the Tuacahn Center for the Arts, and a two-week mainstage tour in Nauvoo, IL.

In 2016, Noteworthy released a new 15-track album, "Ready for a Miracle". They also filmed three new music videos, including "Vivir Mi Vida" by Marc Anthony, "Gloria (Angels We Have Heard on High)", and "Unsteady" by X Ambassadors with the BYU Cougarettes; the latter two were released as new singles. The group performed at the University of Alaska Anchorage in October 2016 at the 23rd annual A Cappella Festivella; this was their first time performing outside of the continental United States. In 2017, Noteworthy released album, "How Sweet the Sound: Songs of Inspiration". In 2018, Noteworthy sang "Come Thou Fount of Every Blessing" for a Mormon Message for the LDS Church.

== Directors, alumni, and members ==
Information obtained from Deseret Book and BYU Music Store.

Year	Director(s)	Members
2004	Esther Yoder	Stephanie Call, Nykelle Cloward, LeeElle Jex, Rachel Kocherhans, Rosa Parma, Ellen Pratt, Ashley Tanabe, Esther Yoder, Jessica Zabawa
2004-2005	Dave Brown	Stephanie Call (2004), Suzie Hall, Lauren Hart, Alexis Munoa (2005), Catherine Papworth, Rosa Parma, Ellen Pratt, Ashley Tanabe, Esther Yoder, Jessica Zabawa
2005-2006	Jimmy Dunn	Sommer Anderson (2005), Ashley Cazier (2006), Jackie Donkin (2006), Camille Hancock, Lauren Hart, Erica Neuffer, Catherine Papworth, Kristin Papworth, Megan Schmidt, Ashley Tanabe, Mikelle Young (2005)
2006-2007	Catherine Papworth	Ashley Cazier, Jackie Donkin, Camille Hancock, Courtney Jensen, Kaity McGuire, Ashley Mordwinow, Erica Neuffer, Kristin Papworth, Nabby Parkinson, Megan Schmidt
2007-2008	Catherine Papworth, Esther Yoder	Camrie Copier, Courtney Jensen, Kaity McGuire, Ashley Mordwinow, Erica Neuffer, Michelle Osmond, Kristin Papworth, Nabby Parkinson, Amy Whitcomb
2008-2009	Catherine Papworth, Esther Yoder	Catherine Cooley, Jenna Engebretsen, Courtney Jensen, Katie Jensen, Ashley Mordwinow, Nabby Parkinson, Kelsey Pratt, Rachel Sonderegger, Amy Whitcomb
2009-2010	Courtney Jensen, Amy Whitcomb	Siri Alemany, Amber Catherall, Cassie Crabb, Lizzy Early, Courtney Jensen, Katie Jensen, Kelsey Pratt, Laina Walker, Amy Whitcomb
2010-2011	Kelsey Pratt, Cassie Crabb	Amber (Catherall) Asay, Cassie (Crabb) Brimhall, Lizzy Early, McKenzie Giles, Katie (Jensen) Hall, Kristen Metzger, Taylor Olson, Sara (Parkinson) Phelps, Laina (Walker) Blackner, Brooke Weenig
2011-2012	Amanda Crabb, Kelsey Pratt	Cassie (Crabb) Brimhall, McKenzie Giles, Katie (Jensen) Hall, Sara Phelps, Hollie Pratt, Tatiana Quinn, Cassie Tobler, Brooke Weenig, Rebecca Woahn
2012-2013	Katie Hall, Kelsey Pratt	Brianna Boyd, Brittany Bruner, Cassie Gonzalez, Liz (Hilton) Tyler, Jillian Innes, Lauren Myrick, Emily Parkinson, Tatiana Quinn, Jennifer Riding
2013-2014	Tatiana Quinn	Shirley Cole, Jordyn Crowley, Cassie Gonzalez, Janae Klumpp, Mariah Kolts, Diana Kramer, Elicia Merwin, Marissa Quinn, Hanna Zenger
2014-2015	Keith Evans	Alyssa Aramaki, Sarah Cunha, Allyssa Jex, Janae Klumpp, Janessa Lyons, Jessica McKay, Mariella Roberts, Tressa Roberts, Bethany Simmons
2015-2016	Keith Evans	Alyssa Aramaki, Sarah Cunha, Allyssa Blake (Jex), Janae Klumpp, Jessica Johnson (McKay), Tressa Roberts, Alyssa Flake, Rachael Holt, Taylor Whitlock
2016-2017	Keith Evans	Alyssa Aramaki Hazen, Bronwyn Bent, Sarah Cunha, Caitlin Dudley Wilcox, Alyssa Flake, Amy Geis (2017), Rachael Holt Garner (2016), Megan Sackett, Taylor Whitlock Smith, Hanna Zenger
2017-2018	Keith Evans	Bronwyn Bent, Kristen Bodine, Beth Campbell, Caitlin Dudley Wilcox (2017), Allie Gardner, Amy Geis, Cami Jones (2018), Jessica Osai, Catie Porter, Maryn Smyth
2018-2019	Amy Whitcomb	Meg Ackerman, Allie Gardner, Ellie Hughes, Cami Jones, Amy Geis-Lorsch, Lizzy Newbold, Maryn Smyth, Anna Slezak, Kacey Sorenson
2019-2020	Amy Whitcomb	Meg Ackerman, Aitana Alapa, Ellie Hughes, Grace Ibarra, Lizzy Newbold, Tiffany Parker, Anna Slezak, Maryn Smyth, Brittan Wawro
2020-2021	Amy Whitcomb	Meg Ackerman, Ellie Hughes, Grace Ibarra, Augustine Larsen, Skylar Mertz, Lizzy Newbold, Tiffany Parker (2020), Anna Slezak, Brittan Wawro
2021-2022	Scott Shattuck	Whitney Anderson, Grace Christensen, Rosie Durland, Grace Ibarra, Augustine Larsen, Skylar Mertz, Kate Miller, Claire Quigley, Brittan Wawro
2022-2023	Amy Geis-Lorsch	Whitney Anderson, Grace Christensen, Rosie Durland, Mikayla Hunter, Grace Ibarra, Kylie Linton, Becca Livingston, Kate Miller, Claire Quigley
2023-2024	Carson Trautman	Hope Ambridge, Alexa Ballard, Addi Chandler, Emma Hooper, Savannah Packer, Kassie Sanders, Randi Sanofsky
2024-2025	Carson Trautman	Addi Call (Chandler), Aubrie Dyer, Emma King (Hooper), Savannah Packer, Kassie Sanders, Randi Sanofsky, Halle Sundberg
2025-2026	Carson Trautman	Addi Call (Chandler), Aubrie Dyer, Emma King (Hooper), Savannah Packer, Kassie Sanders, Randi Sanofsky, Halle Sundberg
2026-2027	Carson Trautman	Addi Call, Lydia Evans, Savannah Glick (Packer), Ally Johnston, Kalea Marler, Aubrie Putnam (Dyer), Lena Suckow

== Discography ==
Album discography retrieved from BYU Music Store. Single discography retrieved from Apple Music and the BYU Music Store.

Albums:

- This Is Noteworthy (2021)
- How Sweet the Sound: Songs of Inspiration (2017)
- Ready for a Miracle (2016)
- Unbound (2014)
- Defined (2010)
- Green Means Go (2009)
- On the Horizon (2006)

Singles:

- ”Oceans (Where Feel May Fail)” (2022)
- ”Olivia Rodrigo Medley: deja vu - drivers license - good 4 u” (2022)
- "What Child Is This?" (2021)
- "Salute" (2021)
- "River Deep - Mountain High" (2021)
- ”Castles” (2021)
- "Grow As We Go" (2021)
- "Amazing Grace (feat. The Bonner Family)" (2021)
- "The First Noel" (2020)
- "Proud Mary" (2020)
- "You Say" (2019)
- "Bird Set Free" (2019)
- "I Can Only Imagine" (2019)
- "Hark! The Herald Angels Sing - Go Tell It on the Mountain" (2018)
- "You'll Be in My Heart (From "Tarzan")" (2018)
- "Feeling Good" (2018)
- "Unsteady" (2017)
- "Gloria (Angels We Have Heard on High)" (2016)
- "Be Thou My Vision" (2016)
- "Star Wars: A Cappella Strikes Back" (2015)
- "Amazing Grace (My Chains Are Gone)" (2015)
- "Geronimo" (2015)
- "Madness" (2014)
- "I Was Here" (2014)
- "Feel Again" (2014)
- "O Holy Night" (2013)
- "I Knew You Were Trouble / We Are Never Getting Back Together" (2013)
- "Without You / I Will Wait Mashup" (2013)
