= Rosalind Hall =

British-American conductor and academic

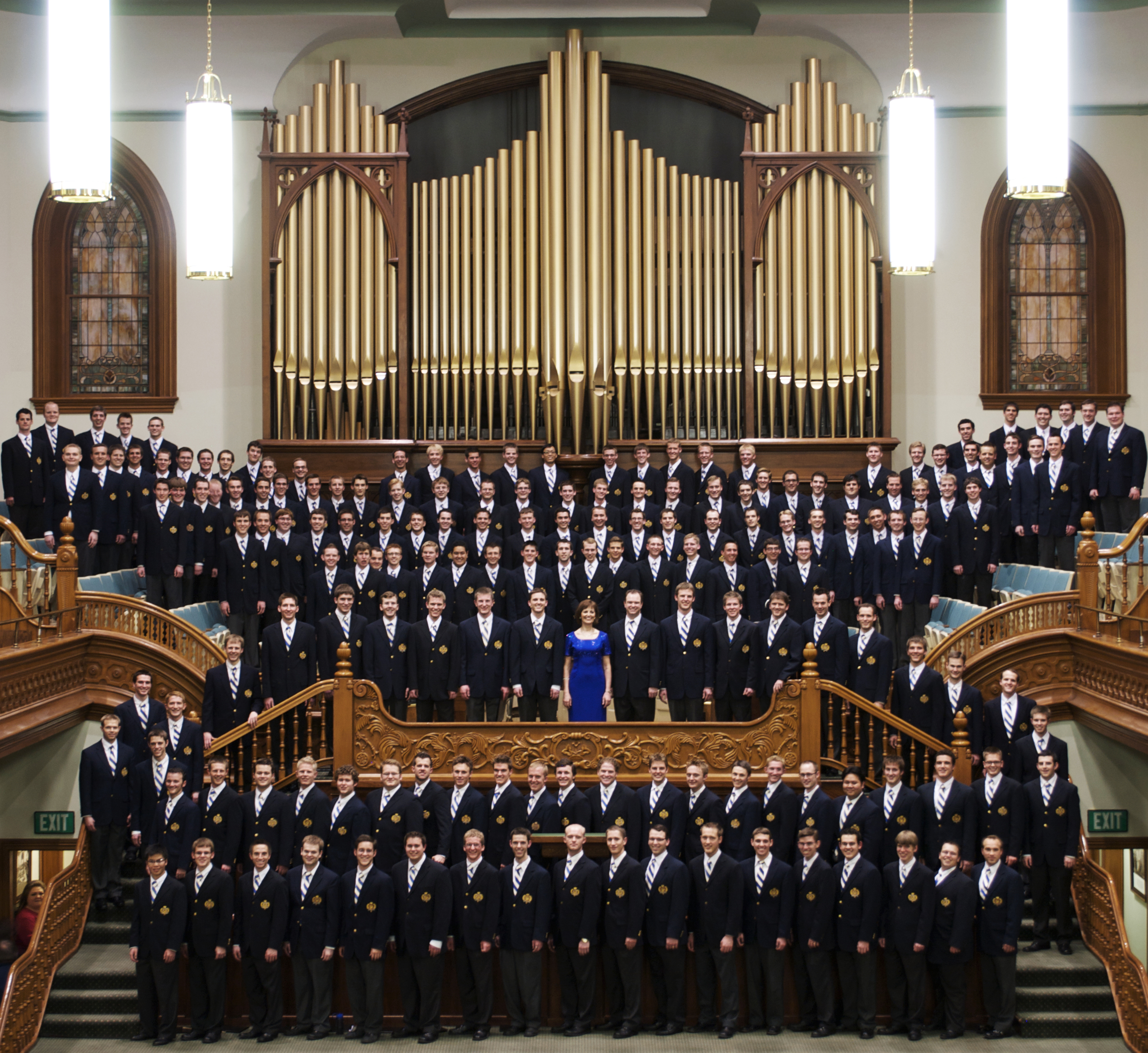
Members of BYU's Men's Chorus, under the direction of Rosalind Hall.

Rosalind Hall is a former director of the Men's Chorus and Concert Choir at Brigham Young University (BYU). In 2020, Hall retired after over 20 years in that role.

Hall is a native of Wales. She was educated at the University of London, the University of Edinburgh and London's Royal Academy of Music, receiving degrees in Voice and Piano. She received a Bachelor of Music degree from the Royal Academy in 1977. Hall moved to the United States in 1989 to pursue post-graduate studies in choral conducting at BYU. While she was a graduate student she also directed the BYU Women's Chorus. Hall received a Master of Music degree in 1993 from BYU.

From 1992 to 1999, Hall was chair of the music department at the Waterford School, where she was instrumental in helping develop the Fine Arts Academy. She became the first female director of BYU's Men's Chorus and Concert Choir when Mack Wilberg left to become the assistant director of the Mormon Tabernacle Choir in the fall of 1999. In addition to conducting these two choirs at BYU, Hall taught undergraduate courses in choral conducting and graduate courses in choral literature at the BYU College of Fine Arts and Communications. Following the 2015 retirement of Ronald Staheli, Hall served as the Division Coordinator for the Choral Division of the BYU School of Music until her own retirement in 2020.

Hall's tenure at BYU was prolific for the choirs and marked by increased visibility for the choral program. She led the choirs numerous times at LDS Church general conferences. In 2006, Hall and the choirs were invited to perform at the annual conference of the American Choral Directors Association, premiering the work "Dances to Life" by Wilberg. She has led the Men's Chorus through collaborative performances with high-profile performers, including Brian Stokes Mitchell, Kristin Chenoweth, Peter Hollens, Alex Boyé, and Ben Rector.

Hall produced a number of recordings with the choirs, including solo albums, composite albums with the other BYU choirs, and music videos. With the Concert Choir, she produced their second solo album, Beautiful River, in 2005. With the Men's Chorus, she recorded the solo album Praise Him in 2005 and released an album of live concert recordings titled Live and Kicking in 2009. Following the October 2012 announcement by Thomas S. Monson lowering the minimum age for LDS missionary service, Hall produced a special missionary-themed album with the Men's Chorus that would be offered free of charge as a download. The album, titled Set Apart, was released in April 2013 and subsequent free tracks have been added each year since the release. She also oversaw the creation of the choirs' first music videos, including teaming up with BYU Vocal Point for a rendition of "Nearer, My God, to Thee" that has garnered over 40 million views on YouTube.

In 2012, Hall was selected as one of the 300 best professors in the nation by the Princeton Review.

Hall was included multiple times on RateMyProfessors.com's annual list of top university professors, ranking 4th on the list in 2012-2013, 12th in 2013-2014, 24th in 2014-2015, 20th in 2015-2016, and 15th in 2017-2018.

In 2015, Hall and Staheli were awarded BYU's Creative Works Award by BYU president Kevin J Worthen for their "outstanding achievement in the development of creative works that have had wide acceptance and national or international distribution."
