= Savannah Stevenson =

English singer and actress

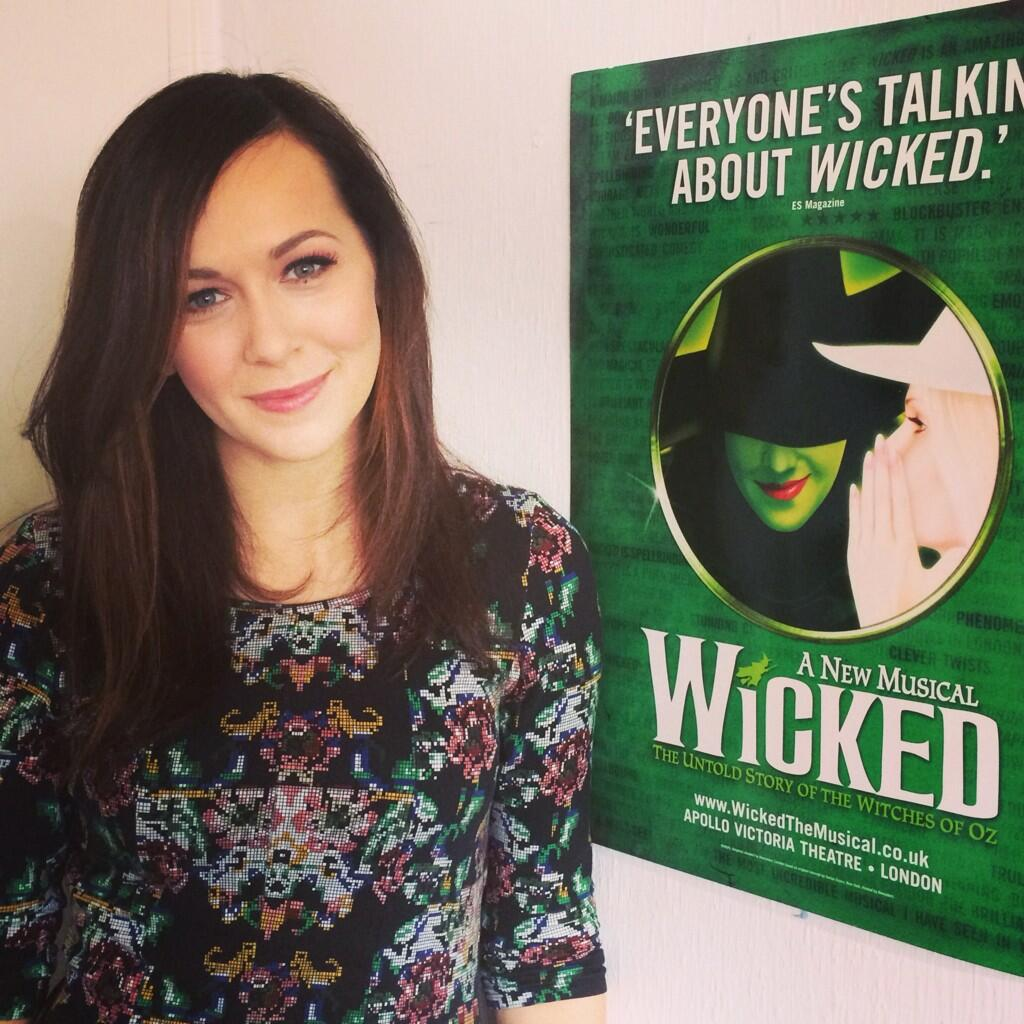
- Savannah Stevenson in 2016
- Born: 1983 (age 42–43)
- Education: The Guildford School of Acting
- Occupations: Actress, singer
- Known for: Wicked

Savannah Stevenson (born 1983) is an English singer and actress. She is best known for her work in the theatre.

== Career ==
=== Early life and training ===
Stevenson was raised in Derbyshire and began performing at a young age. At the age of fifteen, she was accepted into the prestigious National Youth Theatre, and in 2001 began attending the Guildford School of Acting, where she graduated in 2004 with first class honours.

=== Stage work ===
Stevenson made her West End debut as part of the original cast of Mary Poppins. She was cast three months before her graduation from the Guildford School of Acting, and starred as part of the ensemble in the role of Fannie. Stevenson appeared in the show's out-of-town tryout at the Bristol Hippodrome in September 2004, and reprised the role when the show made its transfer to the West End's Prince Edward Theatre in December 2004. In addition, Stevenson served as an understudy to the roles of Winifred Banks and the title character Mary Poppins, and took part in the show's original cast recording.

In April 2008, she served as understudy to Jill Paice in the role of Scarlett O'Hara, in Sir Trevor Nunn's short-lived West End production of Gone with the Wind. After performing in the opening night of the production, Paice unexpectedly fell ill, resulting in Stevenson having to step into the role of Scarlett at the next day's matinee performance, despite having yet to take part in any formal rehearsals for the show. Despite the show receiving a poor critical response, Stevenson received positive reviews for her performance, and acclaim for successfully stepping into the lead role at such short notice. From July to September 2010, Stevenson was reunited with Trevor Nunn when she took part in his revival of Aspects of Love.

In May 2012, Stevenson took part in the Hampstead Theatre production of Chariots of Fire, playing the role of Sybil Evers. In June 2012, the play moved to the West End's Gielgud Theatre, where it remained until January 2013.

In July 2013, it was announced that Stevenson would join the West End production of Wicked, replacing Gina Beck in the lead role of Glinda. She began performances on 18 November, starring opposite Willemijn Verkaik, and later Kerry Ellis, Jennifer DiNoia and Emma Hatton in the role of Elphaba. In March 2015, Stevenson was forced to take a break from Wicked while recovering from a broken foot, though returned to performances in May. She played her final show in the role of Glinda on 3 September 2016.

In addition, Stevenson has taken part in the 2011 national tour of Cowardy Custard, the tour of The Wings of the Dove as "Kate Croy", and she appeared at the Finborough Theatre's production of Our Miss Gibbs. She has also starred as "Martha Sowerby" at the West Yorkshire Playhouse's production of The Secret Garden, "Bet" in the Hampton Court Palace's production of She Stoops to Conquer, "Young Sally" in Follies at Northampton's Royal Theatre, and in addition, she originated the role of "Cinderella" in Simply Cinderella at the Leicester Curve. In 2018, she played Guenevere in the London Musical Theatre Orchestra production of Camelot at the London Palladium. She starred opposite David Thaxton and Charles Rice as Arthur and Lancelot.

Stevenson has credits in multiple workshops - Women on the Verge of a Nervous Breakdown as "Paulina", Pride and Prejudice as "Caroline Bingley", The Loved One as "Aimee", The Count of Monte Cristo as "Haydee", Moonlanding as "Pat Collins" and ‘Seance’ as Theresa (William’s Dead Wife). She also performed on the original concept album of Andrew Lloyd Webber's Love Never Dies.

=== Other work ===
Following worldwide auditions, Stevenson was chosen to portray the role of Mary, mother of Jesus, in a series of videos distributed by the Church of Jesus Christ of Latter-day Saints, filmed on location in Goshen, Utah, and described the role as a 'spiritual experience'. This footage was later used as part of a major viral Christmas campaign called "He is the Gift" which was viewed by over 11.2 Million people on YouTube and Facebook in December 2014. As part of this campaign, Stevenson's image was used on billboards in Times Square, NYC. In 2024, she collaborated with the Latter-Day Saint a capella group BYU Vocal Point for a Wicked medley.

She has made guest appearances in several television shows, including Casualty, Playing the Field, Peak Practice, and Doctors (2000 TV series), and has also appeared in advertisements for T-Mobile and Ask.com.
