= Harris Fine Arts Center =

Arts education complex in Provo, Utah, United States

Coordinates: 40°15′0″N 111°38′53″W

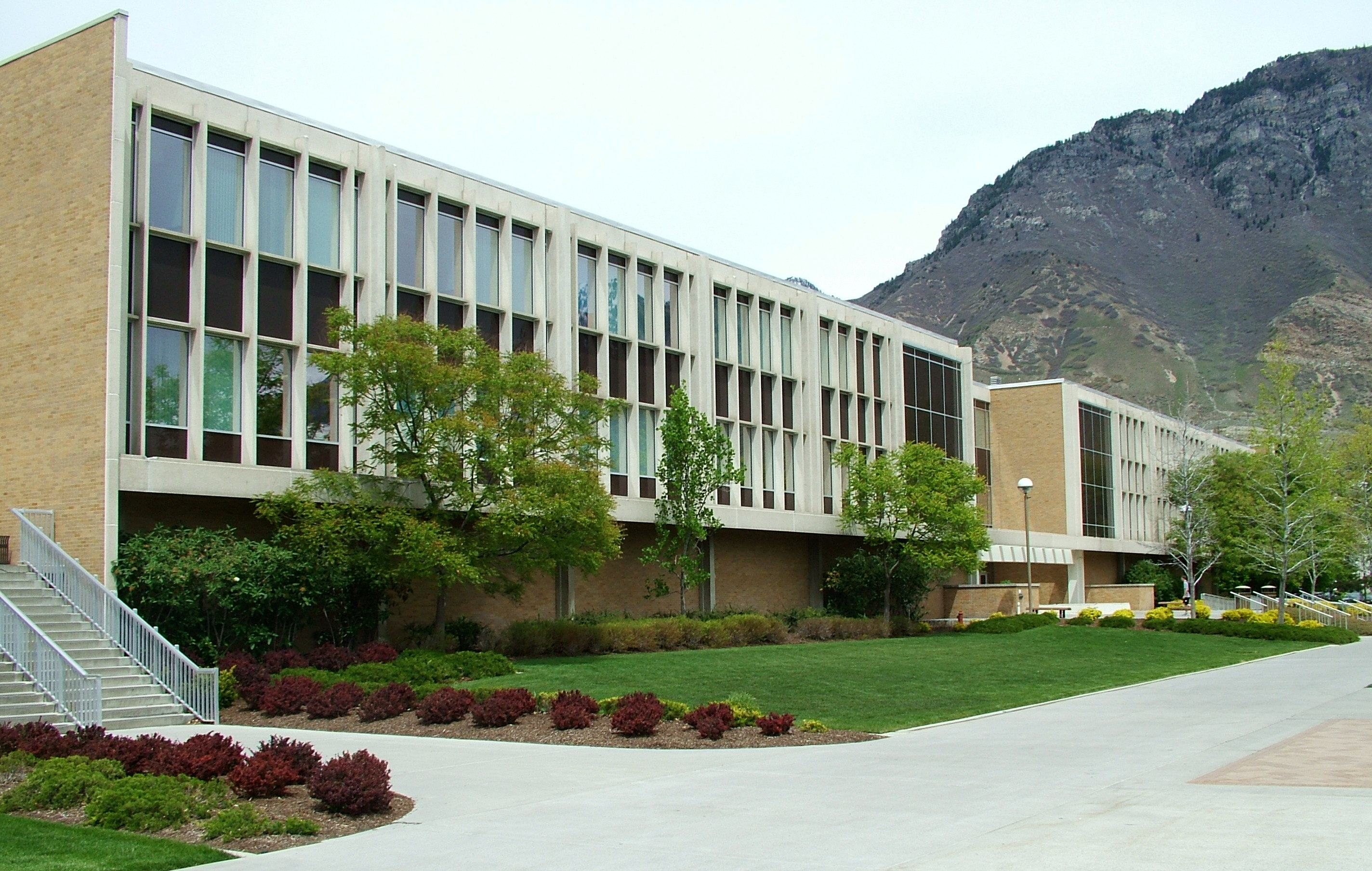
BYU Harris Fine Arts Center

The Franklin S. Harris Fine Arts Center (HFAC) was previously the main location for Brigham Young University's (BYU) College of Fine Arts and Communications (CFAC). In early 2023, the building was demolished to make way for a new arts building on the same site.

The HFAC was inaugurated in 1964 and was designed by architect William Pereira in the modernist style popular at the time of its construction. The building was notable for its dramatic multi-floor, open, interior atrium that served as an exhibition gallery and an acoustically-resonate space for occasional concerts. The building’s entrances featured four dramatic open patios. The open design of the patios maximized natural light to multiple wings and created exterior workspaces for students.

The HFAC was located immediately to the south of the Museum of Art, and just north of the Wilkinson Student Center.

In 2022, BYU announced plans to demolish the building and build a new arts building in its place, in addition to the new music building announced a few years prior. Demolition began in early 2023. In the meantime, non-musical programs formerly housed in the HFAC will temporarily occupy renovated space in the former Provo High School building, now called the West Campus Central Building.

== General overview ==
The HFAC housed the School of Music, the Theatre and Media Arts, Art, and Design departments, along with BYU Arts Production.

The HFAC had over 100 rooms of various types, including 53 practice rooms and four art galleries.

The building had seven pipe organs that were considered to be amongst the most notable in Utah, the oldest of which dates back to 1970, although it had been largely rebuilt.

== Named areas ==
Following is a list and short explanations of named areas in the HFAC.

=== de Jong Concert Hall ===
The De Jong Concert Hall was the largest room in the HFAC. It was named for Gerrit de Jong, Jr. who was the first dean of the College of Fine Arts at BYU. The hall had a seating capacity of 1,269. It was used for most concerts, both by choral groups and symphonic groups as well as many musicals, operas and dance performances. It was also used during the spring and summer terms for the weekly university devotionals. While most concerts at the de Jong were by BYU groups, outside groups such as the Utah Symphony also performed there.

Events at the de Jong not only generated articles in the BYU paper but were also mentioned in Salt Lake City publications such as the Deseret News and the Salt Lake Tribune as well as in independent Latter-day Saint oriented magazines such as Meridian Magazine.

The hall was so central to the school of music's operations that studies aimed at getting ideal sound quality in the hall have been published by the Audio Engineering Society.

The de Jong hall was designed by Harvey Fletcher.

=== B. Cecil Gates Opera Workshop ===
Located next to the de Jong Concert Hall, this room was used for rehearsals of student produced operas. It was named for B. Cecil Gates.

=== Bent F. Larsen Art Gallery ===
This was a three-level gallery, with most of the space being on the main floor and the two higher floors opening onto the main floor. Besides being used for various art displays, it served as the lobby for most of the main theatres, such as the Pardoe, the Madsen Recital Hall, and the de Jong Concert Hall.

The Larsen Art Gallery was also periodically used as a site for dances. It was also used for presentations by the BYU Conservation Laboratory of Fine Art. It was rated as one of the best art galleries in Provo.

=== Franklin and Florence Jepperson Madsen Recital Hall ===
The Franklin and Florence Jepperson Madsen Recital Hall accommodated choral group practices during the week. It was also used for solo and chamber productions by students, faculty and even at times visiting groups.

The Madsen Recital Hall was the main location of the 2005 Primrose International Viola Competition, sponsored by the American Viola Society.

=== Elbert H. Eastmond Art Seminar Room ===
This room of slightly more than 700 square feet (65 m^{2}) was designed for short showings of a broad variety of art objects.

=== Philip N. Margetts Arena Theatre ===
This theatre was designed so that seating and acting can occur in any part of the room.

=== Miriam Nelke Experimental Theatre ===
Besides being used for theatre productions, this theatre was also at times used for the College of Fine Arts and Communications Thursday forums.

=== T. Earl and Kathryn Pardoe Drama Theatre ===
This theatre seated 509 people and was designed in a tradition proscenium stage setup.

=== Laycock Endowment ===
The Laycock Endowment began in 2003 and works to connect students with actual projects for clients, that normally involve inter-disciplinary cooperation. From 2011 to 2016, the Laycock Center for Creative Collaboration in the Arts (created to house the endowment work) operated as an official center in the CFAC. The Center included work for various BYU entities, and a reading application developed for the Library of Congress.
