= Nonstop (Vocal Point album) =

- Nonstop 2008

Studio album by BYU Vocal Point
- Released: 2008
- Genres: A cappella, Pop
- Length: 54:08
- Label: G

BYU Vocal Point chronology
| Standing Room Only (2004) | Nonstop (2008) | Back in Blue (2011) |

Nonstop is the seventh album recorded by BYU Vocal Point, recorded in 2008.

== Track listing ==
| No. | Title | Artist(s) | Length |
|---|---|---|---|
| 1. | "Medley: THX/20th Century Fox Fanfare [Live]" | N/A | 0:55 |
| 2. | "Spider-Man Theme" | Michael Bublé | 3:07 |
| 3. | "Take On Me" | a-Ha | 3:16 |
| 4. | "Superstition" | Stevie Wonder | 2:53 |
| 5. | "Black Balloon" | Goo Goo Dolls | 4:17 |
| 6. | "Sing, Sing, Sing" | Louis Prima, Benny Goodman | 2:46 |
| 7. | "Sunshine Medley: Walking on Sunshine/Ain't No Sunshine/Let the Sunshine" | Kimberley Rew/Bill Withers/Labrinth | 6:00 |
| 8. | "No, Not Much" | Four Lads, Forever Plaid | 2:42 |
| 9. | "Home" | Marc Broussard | 3:24 |
| 10. | "When You Come Back to Me Again" | Garth Brooks | 3:58 |
| 11. | "Praise to the Man" | William Wines Phelps | 2:59 |
| 12. | "Super Mario Medley (Music from Nintendo's Super Mario Bros. Video Game/Mission Impossible/Shining Star" | N/A | 4:20 |
| 13. | "Thriller" | Michael Jackson | 3:51 |
| 14. | "Home" | Michael Bublé | 3:43 |
| 15. | "Bigger than My Body" | John Mayer | 2:52 |
| 16. | "Nearer, My God, to Thee" | Sarah Flower Adams | 3:08 |

== Personnel ==
BYU Vocal Point

2004-2005 members:

- Adam Lancaster - tenor/baritone backing vocals
- Buck Mangum (winter) - tenor backing vocals
- Dan Dunn - baritone/tenor backing vocals
- Dave Brown - baritone lead and backing vocals
- David Anderson - tenor lead and backing vocals
- Jeremiah Jackson - tenor lead and backing vocals
- Jimmy Dunn - vocal percussion and spoken vocals on "Super Mario Medley"
- Josh Rich - baritone lead and backing vocals
- Nate George (fall) - tenor backing vocals
- Ricky Parkinson - vocal bass, bass lead on "Praise to the Man", and backing vocals

2005-2006 members:

- Buck Mangum
- Dan Cahoon - baritone lead and backing vocals
- David Anderson
- Jimmy Dunn
- JJ Haines - baritone lead and backing vocals
- Jordan Keith - tenor lead and backing vocals
- Josh Rich
- Ricky Parkinson
- Ryan Innes - high tenor lead and backing vocals

2006-2007 members:

- Ben Henry - vocal bass and backing vocals
- Brad McOmber - tenor lead and backing vocals
- Buck Mangum - vocal percussion and backing vocals
- Chase Weed - baritone backing vocals
- Jeremiah Jackson
- JJ Haines
- Micah Lorenc - tenor lead and backing vocals
- Michael Sackett - tenor lead and backing vocals
- Ryan Innes

Production

- James Stevens - tenor lead on "Nearer, My God, to Thee", producer, and group director
- Ron Simpson - executive producer
- David Anderson - audio engineering
