= Aréna chamber theatre =

Chamber theatre in Ostrava, Czech Republic

- Komorní scéna Aréna
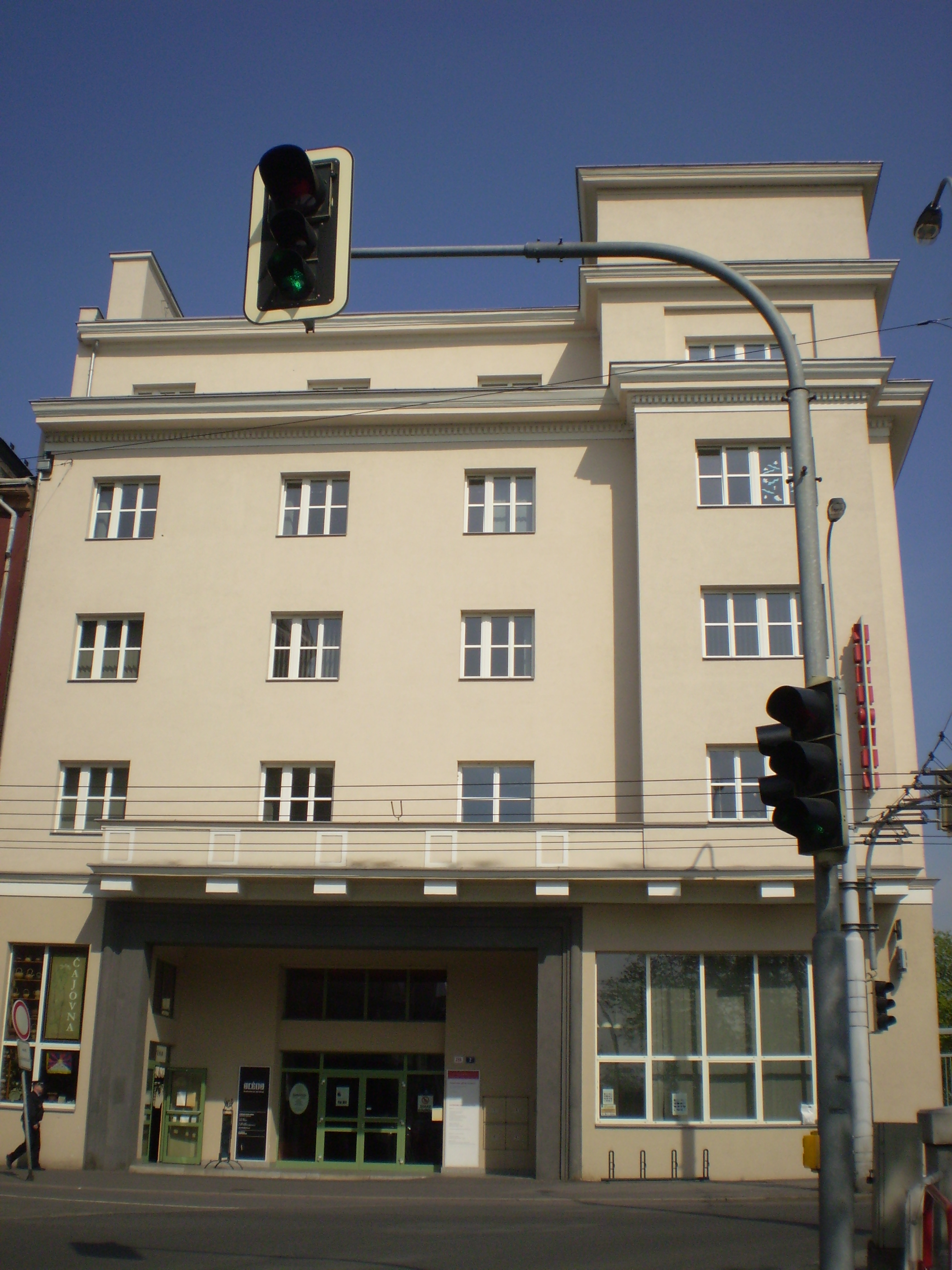
- Komorní scéna Aréna
- Interactive map of Aréna chamber theatre
- Address: 28. října 289/2; Ostrava; Czech Republic
- Coordinates: 49°50′14.72″N 18°17′43.78″E

Construction
- Opened: 1994

Website
- Official website

Aréna Chamber Theatre (Czech: Komorní scéna Aréna) is a chamber theatre in Ostrava, Czech Republic. Founded in 1994, it continues in the tradition of the Music Theatre (Divadlo hudby), which had existed since 1951.

== History ==
Aréna Chamber Theatre was nominated as a candidate for Best theatre of the year in 1996 in the categories "Best actress" and "Best play". Its biggest triumph was celebrated in the year 2003, when it won the Alfréd Radok award for "Best play" and "Best actor" of the year. Both prizes were awarded to the theatre for the Mikhail Bulgakov play Psí srdce (Heart of a Dog), directed by Sergej Fedotov, starring Michal Čapka.

Since the beginning of the 2005/06 season the theatre has been situated in the reconstructed building of the Municipal Library.
