= K. Newell Dayley =

K. Newell Dayley (born 1939) is a prominent Latter Day Saint composer, hymnwriter and musician. He was a professor of music at Brigham Young University (BYU) and later served as the associate academic vice president for undergraduate studies at that institution. He retired from BYU in September 2007.

Dayley is married to Diane Wilcox and they are the parents of eight children.

Dayley received his bachelor's degree from BYU in 1964. He received his MM degree from the University of Southern California in 1966 and a DA from the University of Northern Colorado in 1986.

Dayley joined the BYU faculty in 1967. Dayley was the first director of the BYU jazz ensemble, Synthesis. He also directed the brass ensemble and other organizations as well as many musical theatre productions. He has taught classes from trumpet to music theory and from film scoring to music business. He also wrote the 1975 musical celebration of BYU called Brigham! The Man and His School.

On the trumpet Dayley has performed with the Utah Symphony and many professional ensembles. He also has performed as a soloist with the Tabernacle Choir at Temple Square.

Prior to his appointment as assistant academic vice president, Dayley served as Dean of the BYU College of Fine Arts and Communications as well as Chair of the Music Department and Associate Dean of General Education and Honors. Dayley is currently serving as the dean for the School of the Arts at Utah Valley University.

Among his works are "Bring Forth My Zion", "First You Have A Dream", the music to LDS hymn # 220 "Lord, I Would Follow Thee", words and music to "Faith in Every Footstep", and the music to "I Feel My Savior's Love", "Every Star is Different", "Hum Your Favorite Hymn", "Home" and "The World Is So Big" in the LDS Church Primary's Children's Songbook. Dayley has also written musical sections for passages in the Book of Mormon.

In 2002, Dayley became president of the Church's BYU 2nd stake, succeeding fellow BYU professor Byron R. Merrill in this position.
