= BYU Cougarettes =

Brigham Young University dance team

Cougarettes
- Sport: Dance
- Founded: 1946
- Based in: Provo, Utah, United States 40°15′N 111°39′W
- Coach: Stacy Bills and Morgan St. Pierre (current coaches), Jodi Maxfield (former coach)
- Dancers: 24
- Affiliations: Brigham Young University, College of Fine Arts and Communications, Department of Dance
- Website: byucougars.com

The BYU Cougarettes are a dance team for Brigham Young University, in Provo, Utah. They perform at athletic events on the BYU campus and compete in national events in various genres including jazz and hip-hop. As of 2026, they have won 27 National Championships.

== About the team ==
The Cougarettes are an audition only team. In order to be considered for the team, those auditioning must be accepted as students at Brigham Young University, must be experienced dancers, and must learn and perform the audition material provided. The dancers are required to have knowledge and practical abilities in ballet, modern, and jazz techniques. Each year over 100 dancers audition for the team of 18 to 23 dancers.

== History ==
The Cougarettes were originally established in 1946. In 1998, "Dance Spirit" magazine named the Cougarettes as one of the top 25 collegiate dance teams in the nation, and in the year 2000, the Cougarettes began performing with the Cheer Squad at sporting competitions in halftime performances.

As of 2026, the Cougarettes have won 26 National Championships since 1997: eight National Dance Alliance (NDA) Open Division/Jazz IA championships (2013, 2014, 2015, 2016, 2019, 2022, 2023, 2024), nine NDA Hip Hop Division IA championships (2011, 2012, 2013, 2015, 2019, 2021, 2022, 2023, 2024, 2026), eight NDA Team Performance Division IA championships (1997, 1998, 1999, 2001, 2005, 2006, 2007, 2010), and one Dance Team Union Hip Hop Division IA title (2017). They were also United Spirit Association National Champions in 2005 and 2006, and they won first prize in the New Prague Dance Festival in 2012.
