= Choirs at Brigham Young University =

US choir

The choirs at Brigham Young University (BYU) consist of four auditioned groups: BYU Singers, BYU Concert Choir, BYU Men's Chorus, and BYU Women's Chorus. Each choir is highly accomplished and performs from an extensive repertoire. Together, the choirs have recorded and released over 40 albums. The choirs perform frequently throughout the academic year, both as individual ensembles as well as a combined group.

== BYU Singers ==
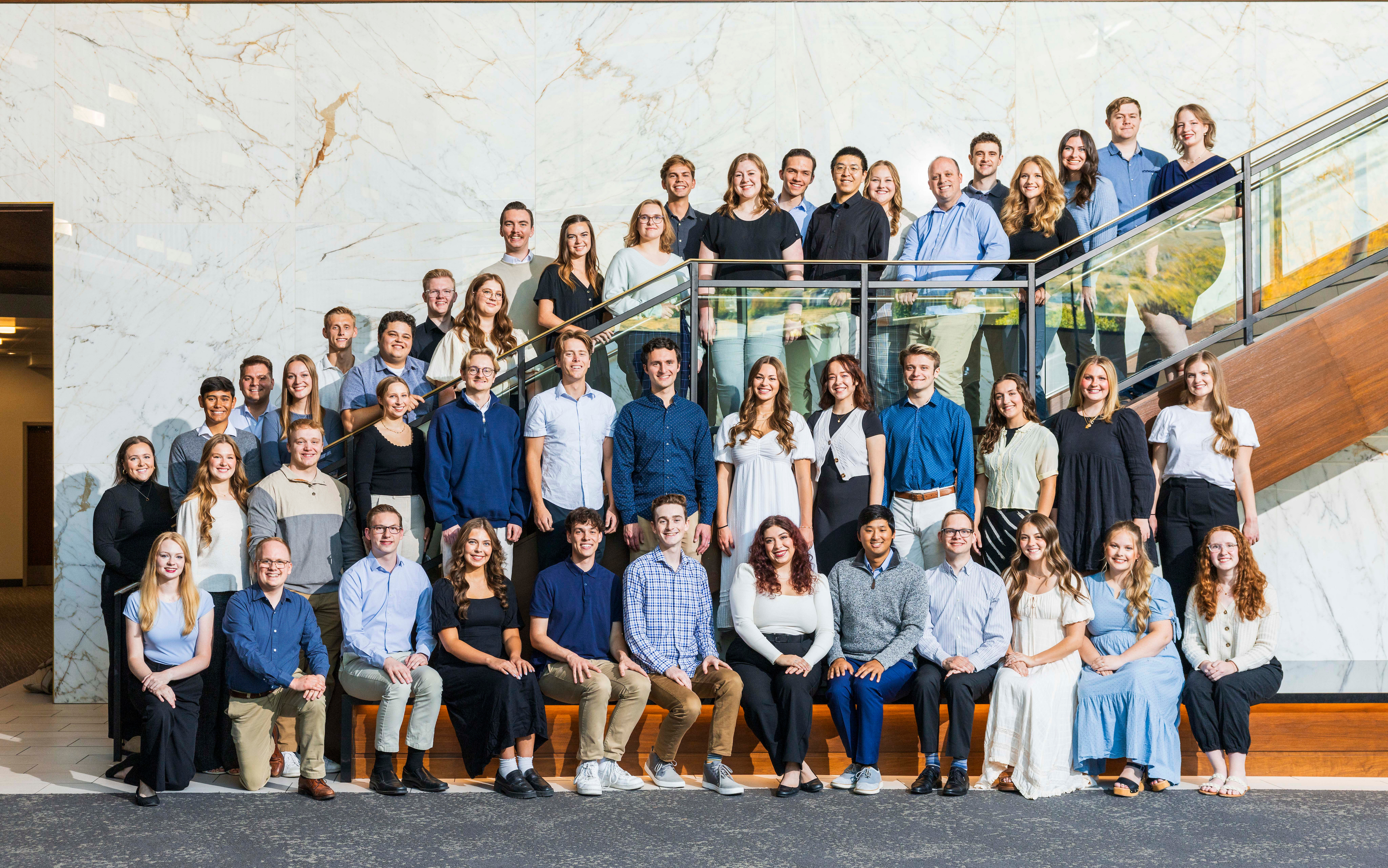
BYU Singers 2024-2025

BYU Singers was founded in 1984 by Ronald Staheli and is a mixed choir consisting of approximately 40 students pursuing a variety of graduate and undergraduate degrees. The choir performs pieces from nearly every musical genre as well as many original works written or arranged specifically for the group and is conducted by Andrew Crane as of 2023.

As the university’s flagship touring choir, BYU Singers has performed at many prestigious venues around the world, including: Carnegie Hall, the Kennedy Center, the Sydney Opera House and Town Hall, the Kauffman Center, the Hanoi Opera House, the Kapella in St. Petersburg, the Musikverein, and the Walt Disney Concert Hall. The group has traveled throughout the United States and to 27 countries including Russia, Germany, Switzerland, Italy, England, Egypt,

30 second sample of Agnus Dei, performed by BYU Singers, composed by Ernesto Herrera, conducted by Andrew Crane

Australia, Ghana, Ireland, China, Indonesia, Vietnam, and the Baltic states.

Since its inception, the group has received many accolades at choral competitions as well as recognition within the choral community. In May 2022, BYU Singers received multiple first place prizes at the 22nd International Stasys Šimkus Choir Competition (Klaipėda, Lithuania), including the Grand Amber award for best choir. In 2021, the group placed first in the mixed choir category, and earned the overall Gran Prix award in the International Youth Choir Festival “Aegis Carminis” (Koper, Slovenia). The ensemble also received multiple awards at the 53rd Tolosa (Spain) Choral Contest in October 2022. The choir was the United States representative at the Fourth World Choral Symposium in 1996, performed at the inaugural conference of the National Collegiate Choral Organization in 2006, and participated in the 2009 Cork International Choral Festival, where they received the PEACE Award, an honor given to the audience’s favorite choir. BYU Singers has performed numerous times at state, national, and regional conferences of the American Choral Directors Association, National Association for Music Education, and National Collegiate Choral Organization since 1985. The choir appeared on national television in four programs created for the Corporation for Public Broadcasting.

== BYU Concert Choir ==
BYU Concert Choir - A Prayer Of The Middle Ages
30 second sample of BYU Concert Choir.

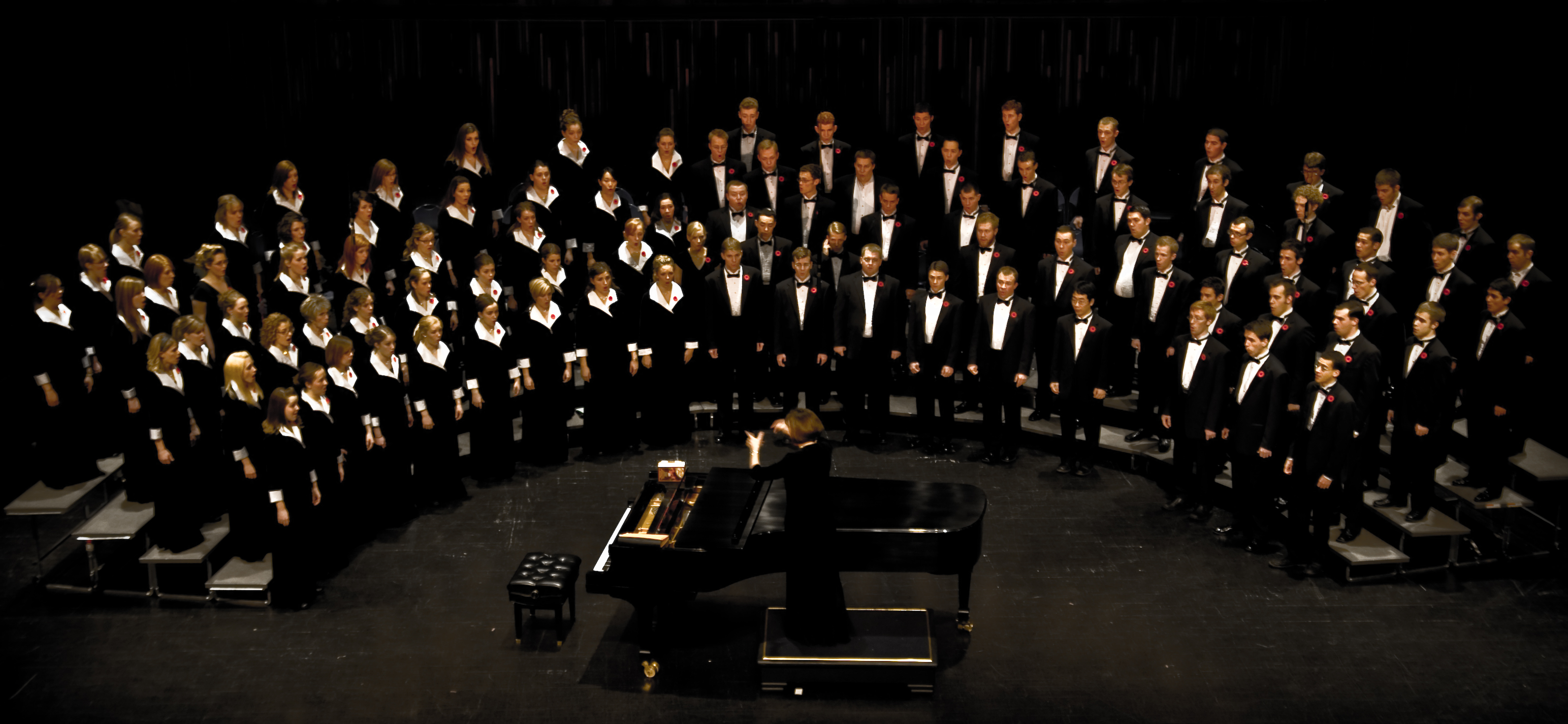
BYU Concert Choir conducted by Rosalind Hall

The BYU Concert Choir is a mixed chorus of approximately 90 men and women. The group performs a wide variety of choral repertoire ranging from the Renaissance to modern, and all from memory. The choir was first organized in 1984 by Mack Wilberg, who has also written a number of songs and arrangements specifically for the ensemble. When Wilberg left BYU in 1999 to become an assistant conductor for the Mormon Tabernacle Choir, Rosalind Hall was appointed to conduct the Concert Choir. Hall retired in 2020 after 21 years as director and was succeeded by Dr. Brent Wells, who began his tenure in August 2020 and continues to lead the group.

The choir has performed at the ACDA convention and with the Utah Symphony. The choir has released two albums on Tantara Records: "All Creatures of Our God and King" and "Beautiful River". In 2006, the Concert Choir performed the premiere of two works by Mack Wilberg: "Till All Eternity Shall Ring," and "Dances to Life."

== BYU Men's Chorus ==
BYU Men's Chorus - El Yivneh Hagalil
30 Second sample of BYU Men's Chorus.

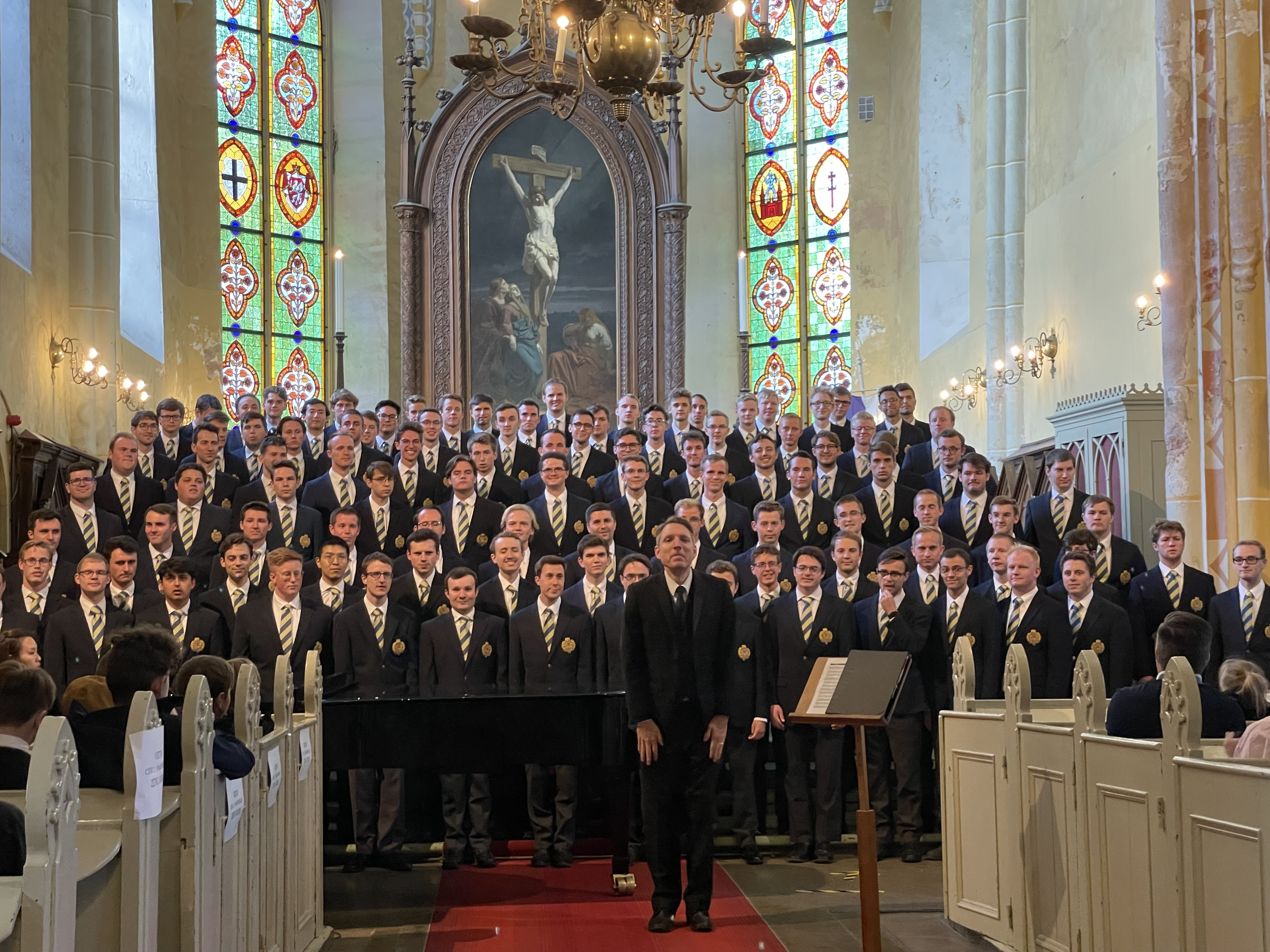
Men's Chorus directed by Dr. Brent Wells in the Baltic States - May 2022

The BYU Men's Chorus was founded in 1901 at BYU as "Male Glee" and has grown to be the largest collegiate male choir in the United States. Anthony C. Lund directed the choir until the 1920s when the choir came under the direction of Florence Jepperson Madsen and her husband Franklin Madsen, though there were short periods where the group was conducted by William F. Hanson and John R. Halliday. In 1955, the Male Chorus became an official class at BYU, conducted by Ralph Woodward, until his retirement in 1984. Mack Wilberg became the conductor of the ensemble in 1984, and the name was changed to Men's Chorus. The choir gained reputation and fame through performances on BYU campus, short tours, and nationally broadcast videos. In 1999, Wilberg was replaced as choral director by Rosalind Hall. In April 2020, Hall retired as director of Men's Chorus and Concert Choir with Brent Wells filling her position.

The choir has performed at the ACDA conventions and performs frequently to sold-out audiences. The choir is limited to about 200 members. The repertoire frequently includes Latin and classical pieces, folk songs from various countries, music of the Church of Jesus Christ of Latter-day Saints (LDS Church), and well-known American pieces.

Men's Chorus has released multiple volumes and albums of music over the years, with most comprising hymns, folk songs, and anthems. One notable album, the self-produced Set Apart, was released in 2013 as a response to the October 2012 announcement by Thomas S. Monson lowering the minimum age to serve as a missionary and the subsequent increase in number of missionaries choosing to serve. As a gift to missionaries and others throughout the world, it was determined that the album would be the first-ever album from a BYU choir released free of charge to the public.

== BYU Women's Chorus ==
BYU Women's Chorus "Beautiful Savior"
30 second sample of the Women's Chorus.

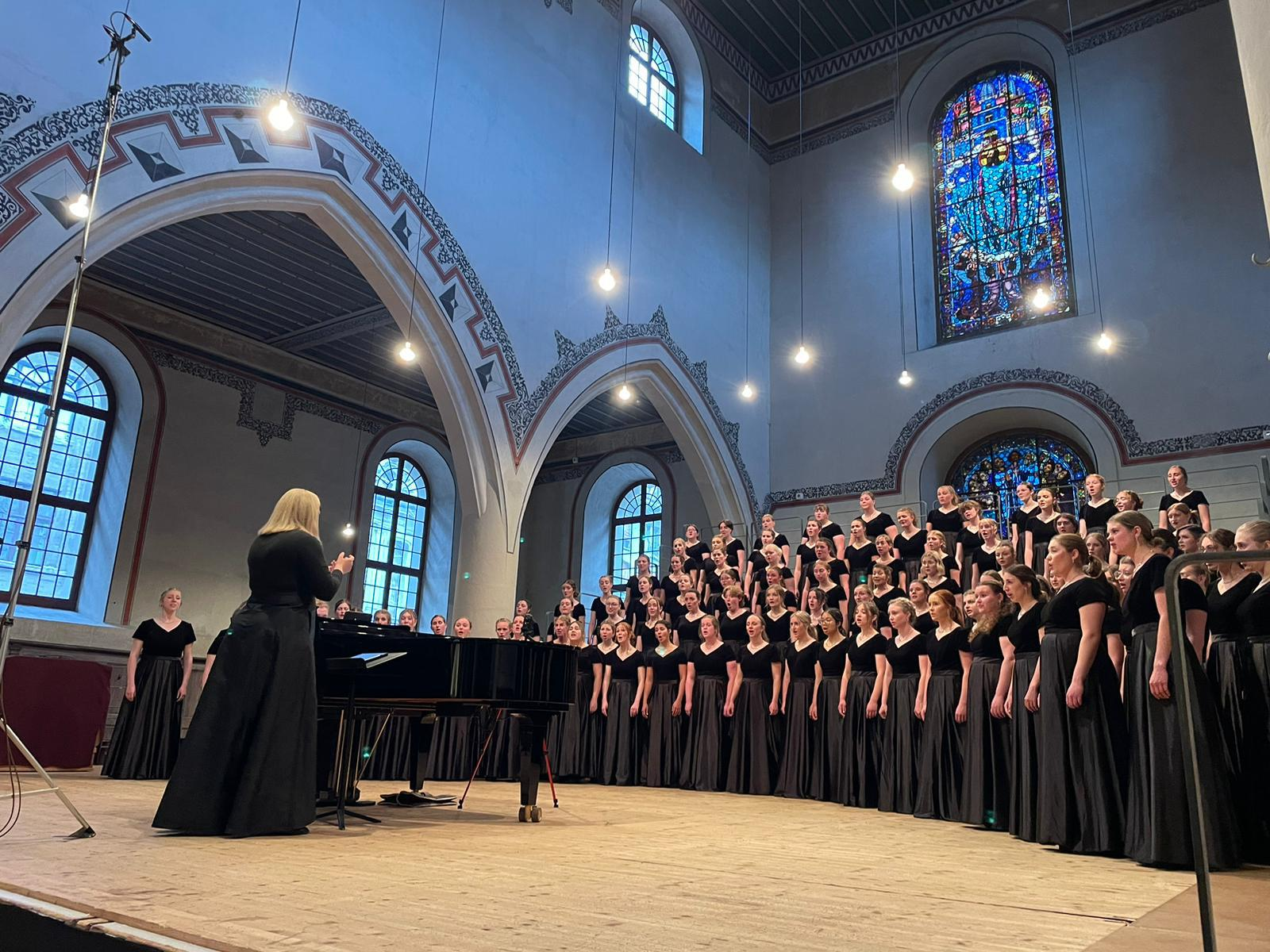
BYU Women's Chorus Directed by Dr. Sonja Poulter in Germany- 2024

The BYU Women's Chorus is made up of about 180 singers and performs a large number of concerts throughout the year. The choir was conducted by a number of different faculty and graduate students prior to 2004, when Jean Simons Applonie (who also founded and conducted the Utah-based women's choir Viva Voce) became the first faculty member to serve as its director. In 2008, the choir released its first solo recording "Wondrous Love" and has appeared on several albums featuring the combined choirs. The choir performed in the 2015 ACDA convention. In 2019, Sonja Poulter became the group's conductor. In May 2024, the Women's Chorus went on the group's first ever international tour to Germany and Switzerland.

== Past choirs ==
The BYU Madrigal Singers were formed in 1952 under the direction of John R. Halliday. Halliday (1911–1988) had bachelor's and master's degrees in music from BYU and a Ph.D. from the Eastman School of Music. He also was an assistant director of the Mormon Tabernacle Choir under J. Spencer Cornwall. For the ten years before the forming of the Madrigal Singers, Halliday was the director of the BYU Bands. The Madrigal Singers toured extensively during the 1950’s. The BYU Oratorio Choir was formed in 1961, also under Halliday's direction, with the goal of performing oratorios, cantatas and similar large-scale ensemble pieces. Other BYU singing groups organized between 1951 and 1975 included the BYU Chamber Choir, the Golden Age Singers, the BYU A Cappella Choir, the BYU Opera Workshop Chorus, and Schola Cantorum. The BYU A Cappella Choir won the International Eisteddfod competition (Llangollen, Wales) in 1968, was named "Best International Choir" at the Linz Centennial Festival in 1972, and was the first non-Catholic choir to sing in the Notre Dame Cathedral in Paris.

== The choirs in a combined setting ==
BYU Choirs & Orchestra - Wiederetwas zurückhaltend from Mahler's 2nd Symphony.
30 second sample of the combined choirs and orchestra.

The choirs perform together frequently throughout the year with a combined total of around 500 singers. Together, they perform a cappella, accompanied by keyboard or small instrumental ensemble, or with the BYU Philharmonic. They have performed Mahler's Second Symphony, Fauré's Requiem, Orff's Carmina Burana, and other major works. The choirs are often invited to provide music for sessions of the general conference of the Church of Jesus Christ of Latter-day Saints, which is broadcast worldwide. The combined choirs, along with the BYU Philharmonic, are featured in four separate hour-long PBS broadcasts: Thanksgiving of American Folk Hymns, Celebration of Christmas, Songs of Praise and Remembrance, and The Pilgrim's Journey Home.

== Discography ==
- A Thanksgiving of American Folk Hymns (BYU Combined Choirs & Philharmonic - 1994) - available on CD and DVD
- A Celebration of Christmas (BYU Combined Choirs & Philharmonic - 1995) - available on CD and DVD
- The Redeemer (BYU Concert Choir, Singers & Philharmonic - 1996)
- We Sing of Christ (BYU Singers - 1997)
- All Creatures of Our God and King (BYU Concert Choir - 1999)
- Live at Carnegie Hall (BYU Singers - 1999)
- Songs of Praise and Remembrance (BYU Combined Choirs & Philharmonic - 2000) - available on CD and DVD
- Songs of the Soul (BYU Singers - 2000)
- I Believe this Is Jesus (BYU Singers - 2001)
- Eric Whitacre: The Complete A Cappella Works (BYU Singers - 2003)
- The Road Home (BYU Combined Choirs - 2003)
- Echoes of the Sabbath (BYU Combined Choirs & Philharmonic - 2003)
- My Redeemer Lives (BYU Singers - 2004)
- Mahler: Symphony No. 2 in C Minor, "Resurrection" (BYU Philharmonic & Combined Choirs - 2005)
- Praise Him (BYU Men's Chorus - 2005)
- The Restoration Oratorio by Merrill Bradshaw (first recorded in 1974; remastered and released as CD in 2005; BYU Combined Choirs & Philharmonic)
- Beautiful River (BYU Concert Choir - 2005)
- The Secret of Christmas (BYU Singers - 2007)
- Brigham Young University Choirs and Eric Whitacre 2 (BYU Singers, Concert Choir & Women's Chorus - 2008)
- Wondrous Love (BYU Women's Chorus - 2008)
- Live and Kicking (BYU Men's Chorus - 2009)
- O Peace of Christ (BYU Singers - 2010)
- The Pilgrim's Journey Home (BYU Combined Choir & Philharmonic - 2010)
- Celebration of Christmas: Merrily on High (Combined Choirs – 2011)
- I Stand All Amazed: Peaceful Hymns of Devotion (BYU Combined Choirs - 2012)
- Celebration of Christmas: There is a Star (Combined Choirs – 2012)
- Set Apart: Beloved Missionary Hymns (BYU Men's Chorus - 2013)
- Celebration of Christmas: Come, Lord Jesus (Combined Choirs – 2013)
- Celebration of Christmas: Lost in Wonder (Combined Choirs – 2013)
- Celebration of Christmas: Carol of Joy (Combined Choirs – 2015)
- Celebration of Christmas: Holy Night (Combined Choirs – 2016)
- Come and Sing to the Lord (BYU Singers – 2017)
- An Enduring Legacy: Dr. Ralph Woodward with the BYU A Cappella Choir, 1964–84 (BYU A Cappella Choir – 2018)
- Celebration of Christmas: Noel (BYU Combined Choirs – 2018)
- Rise, My Soul (BYU Women's Chorus - 2020)
- Celebration of Christmas: Angels Sing (Combined Choirs – 2020)
- Press Forward: Singing Through a Pandemic (BYU Combined Choirs – 2021)
- How Can I Keep from Singing: A Selection of Arrangements by Dr. Ronald Staheli for BYU Singers, 1984-2015 (BYU Singers – 2022)
- Inexpressible Wonder (BYU Singers – 2023)
- In Memoriam (BYU Concert Choir – 2024)
- I Need Thee Every Hour (BYU Men's Chorus – 2024)
- Rejoice (BYU Singers – 2024)
