= Edward D. Maryon =

American painter and educator (1931–2005)

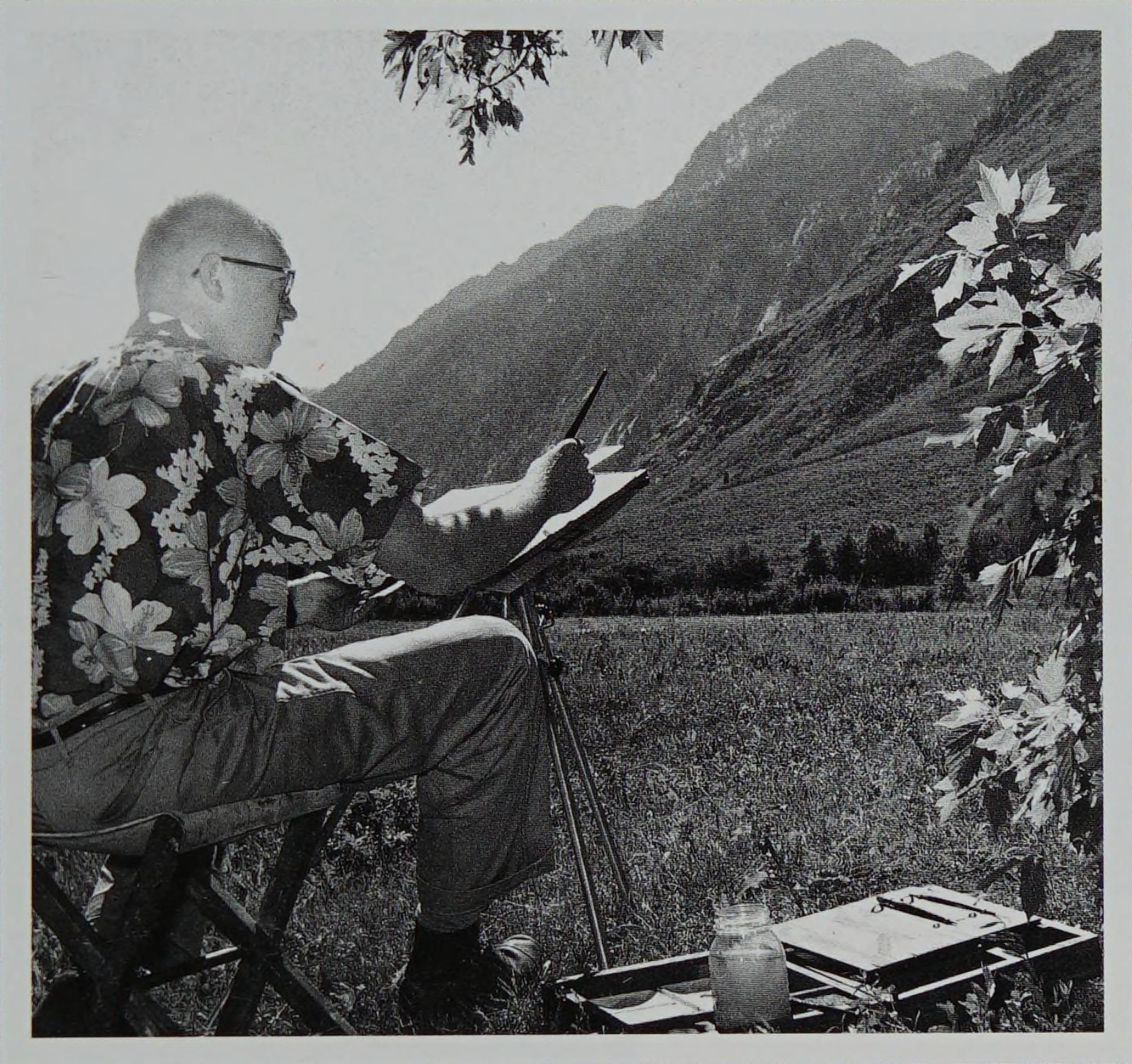
- Maryon painting at Cottonwood Canyon in 1955, aged 24 (Note: When published in The Salt Lake Tribune in 1955, the photograph was captioned as located at Little Cottonwood Canyon. When published in Maryon's biography in 2004, it was captioned as located at Big Cottonwood Canyon.)
- Born: April 5, 1931; Salt Lake City, Utah, U.S.
- Died: March 9, 2005 (aged 73); Salt Lake City, Utah, U.S.
- Resting place: Mountain View Cemetery
- Education: University of Utah (BFA, 1952; MFA, 1956)
- Occupations: Painter, educator
- Employer: University of Utah
- Spouses: Patricia Anne Bushman; Judy Kurtz
- Children: 8
- Website: http://www.edmaryon.com (archived)

Edward Deloy Maryon (April 5, 1931 – March 9, 2005) was an American painter and educator. He taught art at his alma mater, the University of Utah, from 1957 to 1991, and he was the dean of its College of Fine Arts from 1964 to 1981. He painted watercolors. According to Utah Art, Utah Artists: 150 Year Survey, "His paintings are representational but contemporary in that the colors are modified and intensified, as is the light and shade, and space is used in an arbitrary way. The subject matter is stylized freely to enhance the abstract quality of the work."

== Early life and education ==
Edward Deloy Maryon was born on April 5, 1931, to Edward Baker and Helen Sorenson Maryon. He had two sisters, Joyleen (born July 5, 1933) and Gaylo. Edward Baker Maryon, born in Idaho in 1897, had worked for the Utah tax and road commissions and spent two years as a secretary to Governor Herbert B. Maw, then served from 1950 to 1975 as the Salt Lake City tree warden (renamed forester in 1963). Helen Maryon had been born in 1905 in Bingham Canyon, Utah, to Lafayette and Annie C. Warnick Sorenson, and worked as a bookkeeper until marrying in 1927. Edward Baker's father, Percy Walter Maryon, had been born in Devonshire in 1874 and immigrated to the United States in 1889; he married Mamie Cameron of Falls City, Nebraska, in 1902. They moved to Utah sometime around 1908, and Percy Maryon naturalized there in 1913.

Ed Maryon, who sometimes went by his middle name Deloy while young, grew up in neighborhoods around Liberty Park in Salt Lake City. He went to public schools there. This included Hamilton School for elementary, (Note: Maryon's mother served as the safety chairman for the Hamilton School parent–teacher association. Later, his wife Patricia would serve as first vice president for the Bonneville Elementary PTA.) and East High School; he edited the yearbook there, winning an award for the Eastonian, and graduated on June 2, 1948.

=== Undergraduate studies ===
The same year he graduated from high school, Maryon matriculated at the University of Utah. Maryon became a part of the university's School of Fine Arts, and studied under instructors including Joseph Hirsch, LeConte Stewart (a mentor to Maryon (Note: In 1975, Maryon helped facilitate a film portrait of Stewart shot by Claudia Sizemore as part of an MFA in film. Two years later, Maryon gave remarks at an event marking the acceptance by the Utah Museum of Fine Arts of 26 paintings by Stewart into its collection.)), Alvin Gittins, George S. Dibble, and Arnold Friberg. These teachers, along with Maryon's later colleague Doug Snow, were among those Maryon would go on to credit as most influencing his own work and teaching.

During his four years at the university, Maryon was active in many organizations. As a freshman, Maryon was part of the Junior Prom Committee and Associated Students of the University of Utah (ASUU) Art Committee, (Note: Maryon's responsibilities as part of the Art Committee included designing nonpartisan get out the vote posters for the student-government elections.) and Division Editor for the university's yearbook, the Utonian. During end-of-term honors he was awarded a sweater for his involvement in student activities. As a sophomore, he was a member of the Centennial Prom Committee and the ASUU Art Committee, an editor for the Frosh Handbook, and again Division Editor for the Utonian—a post that turned into that of head editor for Maryon's junior year. At the end of his junior year Maryon ran for senior class president, losing to Thomas E. Robinson. As a senior, he was a member of the Student Affairs committee, and again edited the Frosh Handbook; he designed the metal link that, during commencement ceremonies, was added to a chain representing the long line of graduating classes. Maryon was also a four-year member of Sigma Chi. (Note: Maryon's junior-year yearbook—the 1951 Utonian—did not list him on the Sigma Chi page. The index, however, listed Maryon as appearing on that page. The page for the Utonian itself termed Maryon a "perennial Sig sweetheart", and stated that he "has a faithful sense of humor and gets a bang out of Homecoming".)

Maryon's active participation in student life led to his being one of eight named to Skull and Bones as a junior, and, as a senior, one of nine named to Owl and Key and one of an equal number named to Beehive. Skull and Bones honored junior men who were outstanding in student activities; similarly, Owl and Key consisted of senior men who had been active in student affairs, and who strove to promote class spirit and uphold university traditions. Beehive, proclaimed the "highest honorary at the University of Utah", consisted of those who had contributed greatly to campus life. (Note: Maryon remained involved in Beehive after his graduation, assisting with its annual banquet in 1956, and being noted as an alumni representative in 1964.) Maryon graduated with a Bachelor of Fine Arts in June 1952.

=== Military service ===
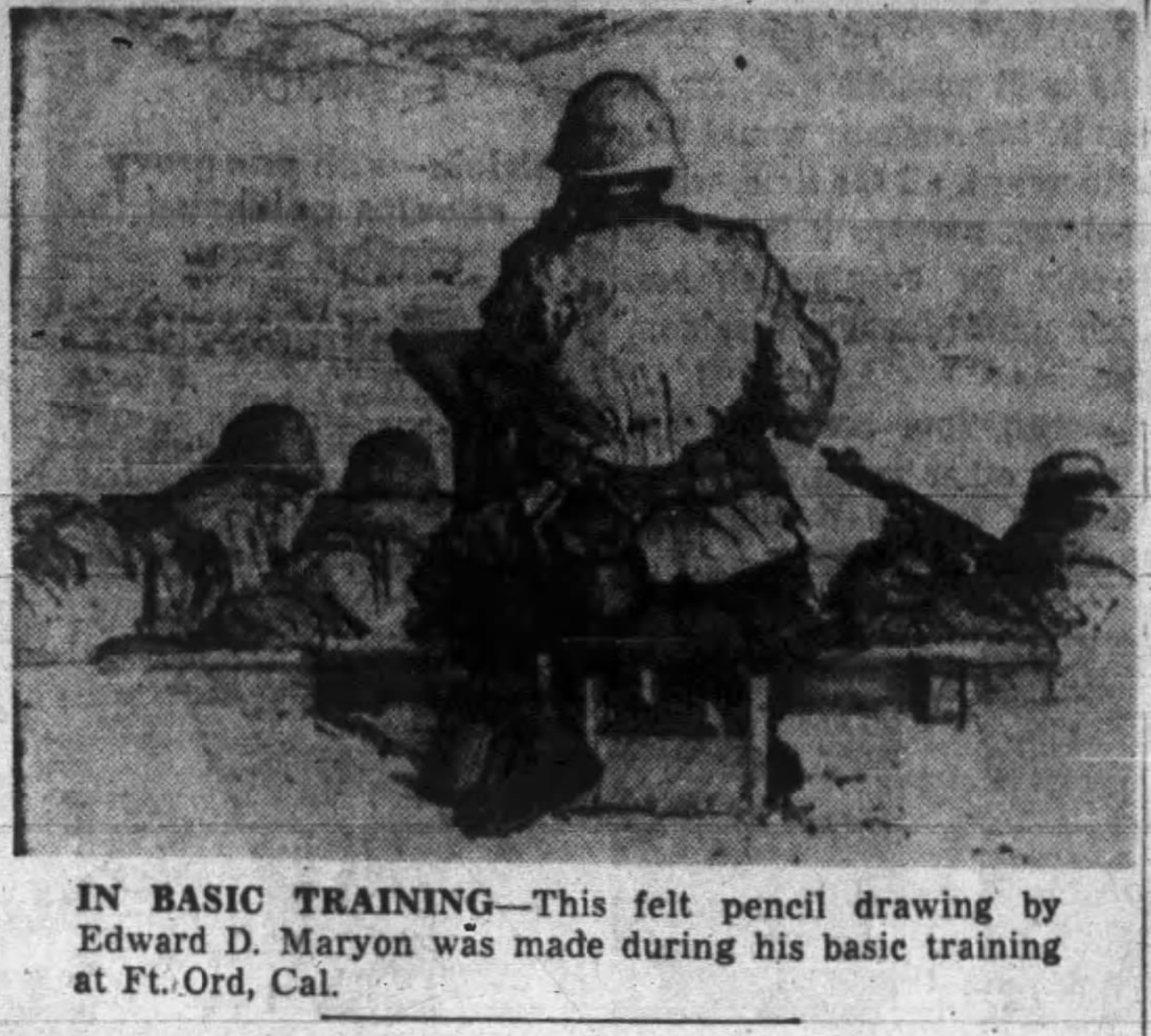
Maryon's In Basic Training, published in the Deseret News in 1953

After graduation, Maryon worked in advertising for the annual Summer Festival, then was drafted into the Army and sent to basic training at Fort Ord in California. "During basic training he kept his pencil and pad handy", the Deseret News reported, and had at least one drawing published in the paper. Maryon's unit was scheduled to ship out to Korea; the day before it did so, however, Maryon was assigned to work as an illustrator in the Army Language School's Reproductions and Publications section at the Presidio of Monterey. Maryon designed posters there alongside other drafting and art work. (Note: Maryon also helped design scenery for a production of H.M.S. Pinafore performed by a group of Fort Ord servicemen and their wives. The production was put on in September 1954 at West High School and Ogden High School in Salt Lake City.)

The assignment to the Presidio, which a later biography termed "fortunate", left open Maryon's evenings and weekends—time he would devote to his art. The Deseret News reported that he spent his spare time sketching, particularly by the wharf, along the coast, or through his barracks window, and filled multiple sketchbooks with felt-pencil and watercolor drawings. During this time, Maryon's former instructor Dibble wrote while reviewing a 1983 show of Maryon's watercolors, Maryon's work "flowered"; it also presaged a lifetime focus on waterfront scenes.

=== Graduate studies ===
In 1954, after two years in the Army and with a portfolio of artworks under his arm, Maryon returned to the University of Utah to pursue a Master of Fine Arts. His instructors there included Harry Leith-Ross, Francis de Erdely, Howard Bradford, and Joseph Hirsch. (Note: In December 1955, Maryon served as a committee member for the Salt Lake Area Quartet Festival.) Maryon wrote his thesis on Portrait in Oil, and graduated in August 1956.

== Career ==
=== Graphic design ===
Following graduate school, Maryon worked alongside Ralph Reynolds at David W. Evans Inc., where he was a designer, illustrator, and graphic artist. Maryon would do occasional graphic design into the 1960s, even after entering academia. This included for The Improvement Era, the official magazine of the Church of Jesus Christ of Latter-day Saints (LDS Church). By the November 1957 issue, Maryon was listed as an art director alongside Reynolds; Maryon's drawing for the August 1960 cover, depicting covered wagons along the Mormon Trail, received a first-place award from the Utah Advertising Artists Association; he also drew the cover for the March 1963 issue, and had a 1966 illustration recognized by Dibble as among "outstanding examples of journalistic art".

=== University of Utah ===
Shortly after Maryon's graduation from his masters program, his mentor Stewart suggested that Maryon apply to teach at the University of Utah's Department of Painting; Maryon did so, and in 1956 became an instructor in basic drawing there. In addition to instruction, Maryon was involved in and oversaw exhibitions during this time, served as a judge for exhibitions and competitions, gave talks, and served on a committee to select artwork to furnish the Salt Lake City Public Library's new central location. In 1961 Maryon was promoted to assistant professor, and the following year the Departments of Art and Sculpture merged into one, with Maryon named chairman of the surviving Department of Art. (Note: Previously, Avard Fairbanks had headed the Department of Sculpture; he retired into a role of sculptor-in-residence and consultant in fine arts. The pre-merger Department of Art, for its part, was headed by Alvin Gittins, who left administration for a teaching role.)

On October 14, 1963, Maryon was appointed assistant dean of the College of Fine Arts. Early in his tenure, he was thrust into a school controversy when the Board of Regents ordered the university to remove paintings, including impressionistic landscapes and nudes, by three artists from a student art exhibit. Maryon decried the decision in a letter as "arbitrary" and "handed down without any reasonable attempt to solve the problem", and stated that there must be "a clear understanding of what [the] exhibition policy is to be". The paintings, he added, were "of unimpeachable character", and from artists who had all won "top honors" in competitions and exhibits. (Note: Years later, in 1978, Maryon was one of several defendants, including university president David P. Gardner, in a lawsuit brought by a former professor, Stephen R. Beck. Beck alleged that he was refused a position due to the opposition, and alleged Maryon said his art has "sexual connotations" and was "an embarrassment".)

Maryon was named acting dean on May 18, 1964 (effective July 1), and in March 1966 (effective July 1), Maryon's acting deanship became permanent; he held the position until 1981. During Maryon's deanship, in 1971 the university built the Arts and Architecture Center as a replacement for the G.I. barracks that had previously housed the department. Unveiled by Bill N. Lacy and with remarks by Maryon, the center gave what Maryon said were the first permanent, individual facility in the department's history, and "one of the finest visual arts centers in the country". Similarly, the university expanded the Utah Museum of Fine Arts from a small gallery into a major museum.

Maryon's deanship also saw the university expand its focus on dance, forming the Departments of Ballet and Modern Dance, creating Ballet West (a successor to the University Theatre Ballet), and helping to found the Repertory Dance Theatre, where he served on the board. As he had in his pre-administrative days, too, Maryon continued to organize and judge exhibitions, (Note: Including American Art Week in 1963 (district director for Salt Lake City); the Murray Women's Club annual awards and reception in 1964 (judge); the Sterling Scholars Awards Program in 1964 (judge); the Annual Spring Show of the University Student Art League (organizer); the Uintah County Fair in 1966 (judge); the National Art Week in 1967 (district officer for the University of Utah); the fine arts division at the 1968 Utah State Fair (judge); a pumpkin-carving contest in 1968 (judge); an exhibit of Mormon art at the Harris Fine Arts Center at Brigham Young University in 1970 (organizer); an art exhibit at the Utah State Capitol sponsored by the Utah Institute of Fine Arts in 1970 (judge); an exhibit of Mormon art at the Harris Fine Arts Center in 1973 (judge); an art exhibit at the Utah State Capitol sponsored by the Utah Institute of Fine Arts in 1970 (judge); the Clearfield Fourth of July Art Show in 1973 (judge); the Deseret News Art Heritage Show in 1973 (judge); and the design section of the Mormon Festival of Arts in 1974.) give talks, attend conferences, and preside over events. (Note: Maryon and other administrators were also criticized by the publisher of Down Beat for planning to decrease the budget for the jazz major before reversing the decision. In 1972, the university declined a request to create a Jazz Institute autonomous from the Department of Music. Later that year, the university reviewed more than 60 applicants for visiting jazz instructor at the university, before Maryon announced the selection of Henry C. Wolking.)

In 1971, Maryon was elected to a one-year term as president of the International Council of Fine Arts Deans, and in 1974, he helped form the Utah Watercolor Society alongside Harrison T. Groutage, Richard Van Wagoner, Homer Clark, and Thomas Leek. In 1976, he helped form a National Research Institute for Arts, funded by a grant from the National Endowment for the Arts and matching funds from 30 universities, which was intended to help facilitate and disseminate research into the arts. Maryon served as a board member and vice president of the organization. From at least 1977, Maryon was a board member of the Utah State Division of Fine Arts. At various points he was also a member of the Fine Arts Commission for the National Association of State Universities and Land-grant Colleges, and chairman of the Steering Committee for the formation of the American Institute for the Arts in Higher Education.

Maryon led students on a number of trips throughout his time at the university. Most enduringly, starting in June 1970 and lasting for 30 years, he took students to spend a week in Monterey; they would paint along the Monterey Peninsula, and receive teaching and critiques from Maryon. Groutage and Snow later participated in the program as well. Even before the Monterey program became established, however, Maryon led students on trips. These included a trip to the San Francisco Bay to visit galleries and sketch with the university's Art Club over the 1959–60 winter break, and a two-month cultural trip to Europe in the summer of 1962. (Note: Maryon also taught summer programs at the university, including in 1963 and 1964, and taught summer workshops and classes for adults. In 1976, he taught a watercolor workshop at Boise State University in Idaho.)

== Personal life ==
Maryon married Patricia Bushman on August 3, 1953, while on leave from the Army Language School. They had eight children: Ann (born August 9, 1955), Ed (born November 2, 1956,), Beth (born October 1958), Daniel Christian (born September 14, 1959,), Don (born May 22, 1962.), Kris, Robin, and Jane (two of whom were born in June 1968 and October 1970). The couple divorced in 1981. In 1985, Maryon married Judy Kurtz. He kept his studio on a piece of property that he purchased from his stepson, Ken Kurtz.

Maryon was a member of the LDS Church and served in the high council for the University West Stake. In the 1960s, Maryon served as bishop of a student ward in the University Stake. (Note: In this capacity Maryon officiated at at least two weddings: the May 20, 1966, wedding of John B. Cahoon III and Karen Willmore, and the June 14, 1968, wedding of John Wesley Hagel and Elizabeth Ann Haglund.) He was a member of the Board of Editors for Dialogue: A Journal of Mormon Thought when it was conceived in 1965, and the same year helped prepare a brochure commemorating the restoration of the Aaronic priesthood. In 1964, Maryon was one of many professors at the University of Utah to endorse Lyndon B. Johnson and Hubert Humphrey in the presidential election.

In August 1951, Maryon served as best man at the wedding of Wallace Vernon Jenkins and Anna Lou Dinwoodey; Jenkins was two years above Maryon at university, and also a member of Sigma Chi and Owl and Key. Maryon also ushered at the September 1958 wedding of his sister Gaylo Maryon.

Maryon died on March 9, 2005, aged 73, in Salt Lake City, of complications of Parkinson's disease.

== Exhibitions ==
=== 1950s ===
- Before August 1956: Springville Art Show
- February 1955: Exhibition of alumni art at the university's Park Building. Included the oil painting Morning Harbor by Maryon.
- March 1955: Exhibition of student art at the University of Utah library. Maryon's works included sketches of the Utah Symphony.
- September 1955: Utah State Fair art exhibit, including Maryon's Mrs. Aikens.
- August 1956: Exhibition of watercolors at the Tower Theatre; Maryon's first major exhibition.
- December 1956: Exhibition of Maryon's works, entitled "People and Places", at the university's Art Department. Included 'Mrs. Aikens, which Dibble reviewed as "one of his best works".
- May 1957: Exhibition of works of teaching staff, including Gittins, Dibble, Snow, Angelo Caravaglia, and Maryon, at the University Union.
- May 1957: Second annual exhibit of painting and sculpture at Olympus High School. Included watercolor studies by Maryon, which Dibble wrote "mark the development of one of the area's outstanding young artists".
- August 1957: Salt Lake County Fair exhibit, including Maryon's watercolor study of a corner market. Maryon received first honors in the category of professional conservative watercolors—possibly for this work, which Dibble described as "prize-winning".
- September 1957: Utah State Fair art exhibit. Maryon received an honorable mention in the professional oil conservative division.
- November 1957: One-man exhibition of watercolors at the Salt Lake City Public Library Board Room and Art Department.
- August 1958: Salt lake County Fair Art Exhibit. Maryon won first place in the Conservative Water Color category, with County Fair.
- March–April 1959: Exhibition with Caravaglia at the University Union.
- May 1959: 56th annual exhibition of the Utah State Institute of Fine Arts, at the State Capitol. Maryon won fourth place and a $50 prize in the painting division. Groutage won first place and Dibble placed third.
- September 1959: Utah State Fair art exhibit. Maryon won first place and best of show for the oil painting Moss Landing, and was awarded $150.

=== 1960s ===
- January 1961: Annual exhibition of the Utah State Institute of Fine Arts held at the State Capitol, at which Maryon won an award.
- May 1963: Sixth annual advertising art competition of the Utah Advertising Artists Association, displayed at the Hotel Utah. Maryon won a gold award as both an artist and art director.
- October 1963: Exhibition of works of local artists engaged in commercial design, including Maryon, E. Keith Eddington, Snow, Keith Montague, William Onyon, and Warren Luch, at the University Union.
- September 1964: Utah State Fair art exhibit. Maryon received the first gold award for professional watercolor.
- October 1964: Exhibition of works by eleven members of the Art Department faculty, including Maryon, Quintin Neal, Gittins, Dibble, Earl M. Jones, Snow, Lee Deffebach, Gerald Purdy, Dorothy Bearnson, Paul Lorenzi, and Jim Haseltine.
- March 1965: Exhibition of works of twelve local artists at the Utah Museum of Fine Arts, including Maryon's pen-and-ink drawing Leo's Used Autos.
- August 1965: Exhibition sponsored by the Utah State Institute of Fine Arts and the Allied Artists of Logan at the Utah State University library, including watercolors by Maryon.
- September 1965: Exhibition of works by eleven members of the Art Department faculty, including Maryon.
- October 1965: Exhibit of 28 works by members of the Art Department faculty and former visiting instructors, including Maryon, Philip G. Morton, Bob Camblin, Caravaglia, Stewart, Purdy, Bearnson, Dibble, Earl Jones, Snow, Gittins, and Brent G. Wilson.
- October 1965: Exhibit of works by Utah artists, including Maryon, owned by the State of Utah, held at the University Union.
- March 1966: Eighth Utah Biennial of Painting and Sculpture at the Salt Lake Art Center, including paintings by Maryon.
- September 1966: Exhibit of works by Utah artists, including Maryon, Snow, and Groutage, as part of a Utah festival organized by the Utah State Industrial Promotion Commission at the Waldorf Astoria in New York City.
- September 1966: Utah State Fair art exhibit. Maryon was awarded second best in show for watercolors.
- March 1967: Intermountain Biennial Exhibition of Painting and Sculpture at the Salt Lake Art Center, including Maryon's Red Field.
- May 1967: Annual art, industrial arts and home arts exhibit at Brockbank Junior High School, including works by Maryon.
- September 1967–September 1968: Traveling exhibit of artists from eight states, including Maryon's acrylic Red Field, organized by the Federation of Rocky Mountain States, Inc. Shown at places including the Utah State Capitol in August 1967, and the Albuquerque Museum in September 1967.
- August 1967: Utah State Fair art exhibit. Maryon displayed in the professional watercolors category.
- August 1969: Annual exhibition of the Utah State Institute of Fine Arts, at the State Capitol. Maryon's abstract work Ensemble won third place; View of Newton by Groutage placed first.
- September 1969: Utah State Fair art exhibit. Maryon's watercolor September Market won best in show.
- October 1969: Exhibit by the University of Utah's Department of Fine Arts at the Park Building, including Maryon's September Market.
- November 1969: "Utah Painting '69" exhibit at Utah State University's Merrill Library Gallery.

=== 1970s ===
- January 1971: Invitational exhibit at Westminster College in the Union lounge, with a selection of paintings by Utah artists. Maryon exhibited what Dibble termed a "strong arrangement of abstract shapes".
- June 1971: Annual exhibition of the Utah State Institute of Fine Arts, at the State Capitol.
- October 1971: Exhibition of works by members of the Art Department faculty, held at the Utah Museum of Fine Arts.
- October 1972: Exhibition of works by members of the Art Department faculty, and drawings and sculpture by Ron Gasowski, held at the Utah Museum of Fine Arts.
- March 1974: Exhibition of 11 watercolor paintings by Maryon at the Waterloo, Iowa, Recreation and Arts Center.
- April 1974: Exhibition of works by Maryon, including Montery Wharf, Dry Dock, and Red's Tackle, at Rowland Hall-St. Mark's
- June 1974: Exhibition at the Pageant of the Arts at American Fork High School. Artists included Maryon, Everett Thorpe, Farrell Collett, Roger DesRosiers, Frank Magelby, Glen Turner, Robert Marshall, Stewart, Thomas Leek, and Avard Fairbanks.
- August–September 1974: Watercolor West traveling art exhibition at the Bertha Eccles Community Art Center in Ogden. Artists included Maryon, Gaell Lindstrom, Adrian Van Suchtelen, Harrison Groatage, and Leek.
- October 1974: Opening exhibition at the Bountiful Art Center in Bountiful, with paintings by Maryon, Stewart, Anton Rasmussen, and members of the center's faculty.
- October 1974: Exhibition of works by members of the Art Department faculty, held at the Utah Museum of Fine Arts. Included acrylic by Maryon, which Dibble wrote "features quasi-organic shapes in a brilliant color field".
- December 1974: Exhibition of watercolors and drawings by Maryon at the Barnes Bank in Kaysville.
- December 1975: Christmas art sale at the Bountiful Art Center, including paintings by Maryon, Nancy and Kenneth Lund, Norma Forsberg, Cynthia Fehr, Claudia Sizemore, Linda Wheadon, and Rasmussen.
- January–February 1976: Exhibition at the Bountiful Art Center of works of artist–administrators from the University of Utah, entitled "Past Chairmen, Department of Art, University of Utah, 1938-1975". Included works by Stewart, Snow, Gittins, Maryon, and DesRosiers. Included watercolours and pen studies by Maryon, including his painting Store and pen-and-ink drawing San Juan Bautista, and a portrait by Gittens of Walter P. Cottam, professor emeritus of batany at the university.
- March–April 1976: 52nd annual National Art Exhibit at the Springville Museum of Art. Maryon won second place for Big Sur Nersery. Snow took first place for The Reef, and Thorpe third, for Mountain Man. All three were purchased by the museum for its permanent collection.
- May 1976: Three-part centennial exhibition The Art Life of Utah, including two watercolors by Maryon. Reviewed by Dibble as "gems that are outstanding for crisp design and resonant color".
- September 1976: Utah State Fair art exhibit. Maryon won fourth place in the watercolor category.
- December 1976: Christmas art sale at the Bountiful Art Center, including paintings by Maryon, Forsberg, Nancy Lund, Phyllis Horne, Mary Warnock, Rasmussen, and Wheadon.
- 1977: Exhibition by the Utah Watercolor Society, where Maryon was awarded best in show.
- 1977: 53rd annual National Art Exhibit at Springville.
- March–April 1977: Exhibition at the Bountiful Art Center of works submitted for the Davis County Competition. Maryon won first prize and $450 for Dry Dock, which the center purchased. Reviewed by Dibble as "a watercolor that explores strong design qualities in luminous warm and cool statements". F. Anothy Smith won second for Fly Asthetic ($200), Robert Day won third for Fisherman's Wharf Monterey ($100), and Nancy Lund and Forsberg received honorable mentions.
- July 1977: Second annual Bountiful Summer Art Faire, including a drawing for ten paintings by Utah artists: Maryon, Ann Day, Richard Murray, Stewart, Dennis Phillips, Ken Baxter, Roger Davis, Diane Shaw, John Shaw, and Allan Thelin. Shane Moore of Bountiful won Maryon's painting.
- May 1978: Watercolor West exhibition at the Utah State University art gallery, including paintings by Maryon, Lindstrom, Groutage, and Alice Hendrickson.
- July–September 1978: Exhibition of works by Utah artists and craftsmen at the Salt Lake Art Center, taken from its permanent collection.
- October 1978: Membership social of the Bountiful Art League, at which attendants were presented with a numbered silkscreen print by Maryon.

=== 1980s ===
- October 1980: Exhibition at the Lumiere gallery of paintings and sculpture by Utah artists from the Wasatch front. Included Maryon's Early Evening, reviewed by dibble as "a recent watercolor with subtle nuances and sensitive design".
- January 1982: Exhibition of 60 of Maryon's works from the preceding two years at the Kimball Art Center.
- June–July 1982: Exhibition of works by three artists at the Monterey Peninsula Museum.
- October–November 1983: Exhibition of watercolors at the Phillips Gallery.
- December 1985: Exhibition of works by members of the Art Department faculty, held at the B.F. Larsen Gallery in the Harris Fine Arts Center at Brigham Young University.
- September 1988: Exhibit at Phillips Gallery in conjunction with Olympus Waters Inc. to celebrate its 90th year in business, with theme of "Mt. Olympus". Maryon's work Mount Olympus: A View From the Foothills won first honors.

== Publications ==
- Maryon, Edward D., ed. (1951). Utonian. University of Utah.
- Maryon, Edward D. (1956). Portrait in Oil (M.F.A.). Salt Lake City: University of Utah. OCLC 43434472.
- Maryon, Edward D. (1987). Helen & Ed: A brief history of the lives of Edward Baker Maryon and Helen Sorenson Maryon and their ancestry. Salt Lake City: Privately printed. OCLC 18497327.

== Bibliography ==
- Brewer, Annie & Harvey, Kris (2004). Maryon, Dan (ed.). Ed Maryon: Reflections of the Artist. Cedar Tree Press, LLC. ISBN 0-9764095-0-X.
- Buchanan, William E., ed. (Spring 1952). Utonian. University of Utah.
- Parmelee, Richard, ed. (May 1949). Utonian. Vol. 44. University of Utah.
- Plant, Pauline, ed. (Spring 1950). Utonian. University of Utah.
- Swanson, Vern G.; Olpin, Robert S.; Poulton, Donna L. & Rogers, Janie L. (2001). Nimori, Linda (ed.). Utah Art, Utah Artists: 150 Year Survey. Layton, Utah: Gibbs Smith. ISBN 1-58685-111-X.

=== The Improvement Era ===
Credited as art director with Ralph Reynolds

- McKay, David O. & Evans, Richard L., eds. (November 1957). The Improvement Era. Vol. 60. Salt Lake City: Mutual Improvement Associations of the Church or Jesus Christ of Latter-day Saints.
- McKay, David O. & Evans, Richard L., eds. (December 1957). The Improvement Era. Vol. 60. Salt Lake City: Mutual Improvement Associations of the Church or Jesus Christ of Latter-day Saints.
- McKay, David O. & Evans, Richard L., eds. (January 1958). The Improvement Era. Vol. 61. Salt Lake City: Mutual Improvement Associations of the Church or Jesus Christ of Latter-day Saints.
- McKay, David O. & Evans, Richard L., eds. (February 1958). The Improvement Era. Vol. 61. Salt Lake City: Mutual Improvement Associations of the Church or Jesus Christ of Latter-day Saints.
- McKay, David O. & Evans, Richard L., eds. (March 1958). The Improvement Era. Vol. 61. Salt Lake City: Mutual Improvement Associations of the Church or Jesus Christ of Latter-day Saints.
- McKay, David O. & Evans, Richard L., eds. (April 1958). The Improvement Era. Vol. 61. Salt Lake City: Mutual Improvement Associations of the Church or Jesus Christ of Latter-day Saints.
- McKay, David O. & Evans, Richard L., eds. (May 1958). The Improvement Era. Vol. 61. Salt Lake City: Mutual Improvement Associations of the Church or Jesus Christ of Latter-day Saints.
- McKay, David O. & Evans, Richard L., eds. (June 1958). The Improvement Era. Vol. 61. Salt Lake City: Mutual Improvement Associations of the Church or Jesus Christ of Latter-day Saints.

- Note: The index of the June 1958 does not include a list of editorial credits, but states that "Some of our regular Era features have been omitted from this issue because of lack of space."

- McKay, David O. & Evans, Richard L., eds. (July 1958). The Improvement Era. Vol. 61. Salt Lake City: Mutual Improvement Associations of the Church or Jesus Christ of Latter-day Saints.
- McKay, David O. & Evans, Richard L., eds. (August 1958). The Improvement Era. Vol. 61. Salt Lake City: Mutual Improvement Associations of the Church or Jesus Christ of Latter-day Saints.
- McKay, David O. & Evans, Richard L., eds. (September 1958). The Improvement Era. Vol. 61. Salt Lake City: Mutual Improvement Associations of the Church or Jesus Christ of Latter-day Saints.
- McKay, David O. & Evans, Richard L., eds. (October 1958). The Improvement Era. Vol. 61. Salt Lake City: Mutual Improvement Associations of the Church or Jesus Christ of Latter-day Saints.
- McKay, David O. & Evans, Richard L., eds. (November 1958). The Improvement Era. Vol. 61. Salt Lake City: Mutual Improvement Associations of the Church or Jesus Christ of Latter-day Saints.
- McKay, David O. & Evans, Richard L., eds. (December 1958). The Improvement Era. Vol. 61. Salt Lake City: Mutual Improvement Associations of the Church or Jesus Christ of Latter-day Saints.
- McKay, David O. & Evans, Richard L., eds. (January 1959). The Improvement Era. Vol. 62. Salt Lake City: Mutual Improvement Associations of the Church or Jesus Christ of Latter-day Saints.
- McKay, David O. & Evans, Richard L., eds. (February 1959). The Improvement Era. Vol. 62. Salt Lake City: Mutual Improvement Associations of the Church or Jesus Christ of Latter-day Saints.
- McKay, David O. & Evans, Richard L., eds. (March 1959). The Improvement Era. Vol. 62. Salt Lake City: Mutual Improvement Associations of the Church or Jesus Christ of Latter-day Saints.
- McKay, David O. & Evans, Richard L., eds. (April 1959). The Improvement Era. Vol. 62. Salt Lake City: Mutual Improvement Associations of the Church or Jesus Christ of Latter-day Saints.
- McKay, David O. & Evans, Richard L., eds. (May 1959). The Improvement Era. Vol. 62. Salt Lake City: Mutual Improvement Associations of the Church or Jesus Christ of Latter-day Saints.
- McKay, David O. & Evans, Richard L., eds. (June 1959). The Improvement Era. Vol. 62. Salt Lake City: Mutual Improvement Associations of the Church or Jesus Christ of Latter-day Saints.
- McKay, David O. & Evans, Richard L., eds. (July 1959). The Improvement Era. Vol. 62. Salt Lake City: Mutual Improvement Associations of the Church or Jesus Christ of Latter-day Saints.
- McKay, David O. & Evans, Richard L., eds. (August 1959). The Improvement Era. Vol. 62. Salt Lake City: Mutual Improvement Associations of the Church or Jesus Christ of Latter-day Saints.
- McKay, David O. & Evans, Richard L., eds. (September 1959). The Improvement Era. Vol. 62. Salt Lake City: Mutual Improvement Associations of the Church or Jesus Christ of Latter-day Saints.
- McKay, David O. & Evans, Richard L., eds. (October 1959). The Improvement Era. Vol. 62. Salt Lake City: Mutual Improvement Associations of the Church or Jesus Christ of Latter-day Saints.
- McKay, David O. & Evans, Richard L., eds. (November 1959). The Improvement Era. Vol. 62. Salt Lake City: Mutual Improvement Associations of the Church or Jesus Christ of Latter-day Saints.
- McKay, David O. & Evans, Richard L., eds. (December 1959). The Improvement Era. Vol. 62. Salt Lake City: Mutual Improvement Associations of the Church or Jesus Christ of Latter-day Saints.
- McKay, David O. & Evans, Richard L., eds. (January 1960). The Improvement Era. Vol. 63. Salt Lake City: Mutual Improvement Associations of the Church or Jesus Christ of Latter-day Saints.
- McKay, David O. & Evans, Richard L., eds. (February 1960). The Improvement Era. Vol. 63. Salt Lake City: Mutual Improvement Associations of the Church or Jesus Christ of Latter-day Saints.
- McKay, David O. & Evans, Richard L., eds. (March 1960). The Improvement Era. Vol. 63. Salt Lake City: Mutual Improvement Associations of the Church or Jesus Christ of Latter-day Saints.
- McKay, David O. & Evans, Richard L., eds. (April 1960). The Improvement Era. Vol. 63. Salt Lake City: Mutual Improvement Associations of the Church or Jesus Christ of Latter-day Saints.
- McKay, David O. & Evans, Richard L., eds. (May 1960). The Improvement Era. Vol. 63. Salt Lake City: Mutual Improvement Associations of the Church or Jesus Christ of Latter-day Saints.
- McKay, David O. & Evans, Richard L., eds. (June 1960). The Improvement Era. Vol. 63. Salt Lake City: Mutual Improvement Associations of the Church or Jesus Christ of Latter-day Saints.
- McKay, David O. & Evans, Richard L., eds. (July 1960). The Improvement Era. Vol. 63. Salt Lake City: Mutual Improvement Associations of the Church or Jesus Christ of Latter-day Saints.
- McKay, David O. & Evans, Richard L., eds. (August 1960). The Improvement Era. Vol. 63. Salt Lake City: Mutual Improvement Associations of the Church or Jesus Christ of Latter-day Saints.
- McKay, David O. & Evans, Richard L., eds. (September 1960). The Improvement Era. Vol. 63. Salt Lake City: Mutual Improvement Associations of the Church or Jesus Christ of Latter-day Saints.
- McKay, David O. & Evans, Richard L., eds. (October 1960). The Improvement Era. Vol. 63. Salt Lake City: Mutual Improvement Associations of the Church or Jesus Christ of Latter-day Saints.
- McKay, David O. & Evans, Richard L., eds. (November 1960). The Improvement Era. Vol. 63. Salt Lake City: Mutual Improvement Associations of the Church or Jesus Christ of Latter-day Saints.
- McKay, David O. & Evans, Richard L., eds. (December 1960). The Improvement Era. Vol. 63. Salt Lake City: Mutual Improvement Associations of the Church or Jesus Christ of Latter-day Saints.
- McKay, David O. & Evans, Richard L., eds. (January 1961). The Improvement Era. Vol. 64. Salt Lake City: Mutual Improvement Associations of the Church or Jesus Christ of Latter-day Saints.
- McKay, David O. & Evans, Richard L., eds. (February 1961). The Improvement Era. Vol. 64. Salt Lake City: Mutual Improvement Associations of the Church or Jesus Christ of Latter-day Saints.
- McKay, David O. & Evans, Richard L., eds. (March 1961). The Improvement Era. Vol. 64. Salt Lake City: Mutual Improvement Associations of the Church or Jesus Christ of Latter-day Saints.
- McKay, David O. & Evans, Richard L., eds. (April 1961). The Improvement Era. Vol. 64. Salt Lake City: Mutual Improvement Associations of the Church or Jesus Christ of Latter-day Saints.
- McKay, David O. & Evans, Richard L., eds. (May 1961). The Improvement Era. Vol. 64. Salt Lake City: Mutual Improvement Associations of the Church or Jesus Christ of Latter-day Saints.
- McKay, David O. & Evans, Richard L., eds. (June 1961). The Improvement Era. Vol. 64. Salt Lake City: Mutual Improvement Associations of the Church or Jesus Christ of Latter-day Saints.
- McKay, David O. & Evans, Richard L., eds. (July 1961). The Improvement Era. Vol. 64. Salt Lake City: Mutual Improvement Associations of the Church or Jesus Christ of Latter-day Saints.
- McKay, David O. & Evans, Richard L., eds. (August 1961). The Improvement Era. Vol. 64. Salt Lake City: Mutual Improvement Associations of the Church or Jesus Christ of Latter-day Saints.
- McKay, David O. & Evans, Richard L., eds. (September 1961). The Improvement Era. Vol. 64. Salt Lake City: Mutual Improvement Associations of the Church or Jesus Christ of Latter-day Saints.
- McKay, David O. & Evans, Richard L., eds. (October 1961). The Improvement Era. Vol. 64. Salt Lake City: Mutual Improvement Associations of the Church or Jesus Christ of Latter-day Saints.
- McKay, David O. & Evans, Richard L., eds. (November 1961). The Improvement Era. Vol. 64. Salt Lake City: Mutual Improvement Associations of the Church or Jesus Christ of Latter-day Saints.
- McKay, David O. & Evans, Richard L., eds. (December 1961). The Improvement Era. Vol. 64. Salt Lake City: Mutual Improvement Associations of the Church or Jesus Christ of Latter-day Saints.
- McKay, David O. & Evans, Richard L., eds. (January 1962). The Improvement Era. Vol. 65. Salt Lake City: Mutual Improvement Associations of the Church or Jesus Christ of Latter-day Saints.
- McKay, David O. & Evans, Richard L., eds. (February 1962). The Improvement Era. Vol. 65. Salt Lake City: Mutual Improvement Associations of the Church or Jesus Christ of Latter-day Saints.

Credited as artist

- McKay, David O. & Evans, Richard L., eds. (May 1962). The Improvement Era. Vol. 65. Salt Lake City: Mutual Improvement Associations of the Church or Jesus Christ of Latter-day Saints.
- McKay, David O. & Evans, Richard L., eds. (December 1962). The Improvement Era. Vol. 65. Salt Lake City: Mutual Improvement Associations of the Church or Jesus Christ of Latter-day Saints.
- McKay, David O. & Evans, Richard L., eds. (February 1963). The Improvement Era. Vol. 66. Salt Lake City: Mutual Improvement Associations of the Church or Jesus Christ of Latter-day Saints.
- McKay, David O. & Evans, Richard L., eds. (March 1963). The Improvement Era. Vol. 66. Salt Lake City: Mutual Improvement Associations of the Church or Jesus Christ of Latter-day Saints.
- McKay, David O. & Evans, Richard L., eds. (May 1963). The Improvement Era. Vol. 66. Salt Lake City: Mutual Improvement Associations of the Church or Jesus Christ of Latter-day Saints.
- McKay, David O. & Evans, Richard L., eds. (July 1963). The Improvement Era. Vol. 66. Salt Lake City: Mutual Improvement Associations of the Church or Jesus Christ of Latter-day Saints.
- McKay, David O. & Evans, Richard L., eds. (August 1963). The Improvement Era. Vol. 66. Salt Lake City: Mutual Improvement Associations of the Church or Jesus Christ of Latter-day Saints.
- McKay, David O. & Evans, Richard L., eds. (December 1963). The Improvement Era. Vol. 66. Salt Lake City: Mutual Improvement Associations of the Church or Jesus Christ of Latter-day Saints.
- McKay, David O. & Evans, Richard L., eds. (January 1964). The Improvement Era. Vol. 67. Salt Lake City: Mutual Improvement Associations of the Church or Jesus Christ of Latter-day Saints.
- McKay, David O. & Evans, Richard L., eds. (February 1964). The Improvement Era. Vol. 67. Salt Lake City: Mutual Improvement Associations of the Church or Jesus Christ of Latter-day Saints.
- McKay, David O. & Evans, Richard L., eds. (April 1964). The Improvement Era. Vol. 67. Salt Lake City: Mutual Improvement Associations of the Church or Jesus Christ of Latter-day Saints.
- McKay, David O. & Evans, Richard L., eds. (May 1964). The Improvement Era. Vol. 67. Salt Lake City: Mutual Improvement Associations of the Church or Jesus Christ of Latter-day Saints.
- McKay, David O. & Evans, Richard L., eds. (June 1964). The Improvement Era. Vol. 67. Salt Lake City: Mutual Improvement Associations of the Church or Jesus Christ of Latter-day Saints.
- McKay, David O. & Evans, Richard L., eds. (July 1964). The Improvement Era. Vol. 67. Salt Lake City: Mutual Improvement Associations of the Church or Jesus Christ of Latter-day Saints.
- McKay, David O. & Evans, Richard L., eds. (September 1964). The Improvement Era. Vol. 67. Salt Lake City: Mutual Improvement Associations of the Church or Jesus Christ of Latter-day Saints.
- McKay, David O. & Evans, Richard L., eds. (October 1964). The Improvement Era. Vol. 67. Salt Lake City: Mutual Improvement Associations of the Church or Jesus Christ of Latter-day Saints.
- McKay, David O. & Evans, Richard L., eds. (November 1964). The Improvement Era. Vol. 67. Salt Lake City: Mutual Improvement Associations of the Church or Jesus Christ of Latter-day Saints.
- McKay, David O. & Evans, Richard L., eds. (December 1964). The Improvement Era. Vol. 67. Salt Lake City: Mutual Improvement Associations of the Church or Jesus Christ of Latter-day Saints.
- McKay, David O. & Evans, Richard L., eds. (January 1965). The Improvement Era. Vol. 68. Salt Lake City: Mutual Improvement Associations of the Church or Jesus Christ of Latter-day Saints.
- McKay, David O. & Evans, Richard L., eds. (February 1965). The Improvement Era. Vol. 68. Salt Lake City: Mutual Improvement Associations of the Church or Jesus Christ of Latter-day Saints.
- McKay, David O. & Evans, Richard L., eds. (March 1965). The Improvement Era. Vol. 68. Salt Lake City: Mutual Improvement Associations of the Church or Jesus Christ of Latter-day Saints.
- McKay, David O. & Evans, Richard L., eds. (April 1965). The Improvement Era. Vol. 68. Salt Lake City: Mutual Improvement Associations of the Church or Jesus Christ of Latter-day Saints.
- McKay, David O. & Evans, Richard L., eds. (May 1965). The Improvement Era. Vol. 68. Salt Lake City: Mutual Improvement Associations of the Church or Jesus Christ of Latter-day Saints.
- McKay, David O. & Evans, Richard L., eds. (June 1965). The Improvement Era. Vol. 68. Salt Lake City: Mutual Improvement Associations of the Church or Jesus Christ of Latter-day Saints.
- McKay, David O. & Evans, Richard L., eds. (July 1965). The Improvement Era. Vol. 68. Salt Lake City: Mutual Improvement Associations of the Church or Jesus Christ of Latter-day Saints.
- McKay, David O. & Evans, Richard L., eds. (August 1965). The Improvement Era. Vol. 68. Salt Lake City: Mutual Improvement Associations of the Church or Jesus Christ of Latter-day Saints.
- McKay, David O. & Evans, Richard L., eds. (October 1965). The Improvement Era. Vol. 68. Salt Lake City: Mutual Improvement Associations of the Church or Jesus Christ of Latter-day Saints.
- McKay, David O. & Evans, Richard L., eds. (November 1965). The Improvement Era. Vol. 68. Salt Lake City: Mutual Improvement Associations of the Church or Jesus Christ of Latter-day Saints.
- McKay, David O. & Evans, Richard L., eds. (December 1965). The Improvement Era. Vol. 68. Salt Lake City: Mutual Improvement Associations of the Church or Jesus Christ of Latter-day Saints.
- McKay, David O. & Evans, Richard L., eds. (January 1966). The Improvement Era. Vol. 69. Salt Lake City: Mutual Improvement Associations of the Church or Jesus Christ of Latter-day Saints.
- McKay, David O. & Evans, Richard L., eds. (February 1966). The Improvement Era. Vol. 69. Salt Lake City: Mutual Improvement Associations of the Church or Jesus Christ of Latter-day Saints.
- McKay, David O. & Evans, Richard L., eds. (March 1966). The Improvement Era. Vol. 69. Salt Lake City: Mutual Improvement Associations of the Church or Jesus Christ of Latter-day Saints.
- McKay, David O. & Evans, Richard L., eds. (April 1966). The Improvement Era. Vol. 69. Salt Lake City: Mutual Improvement Associations of the Church or Jesus Christ of Latter-day Saints.
- McKay, David O. & Evans, Richard L., eds. (May 1966). The Improvement Era. Vol. 69. Salt Lake City: Mutual Improvement Associations of the Church or Jesus Christ of Latter-day Saints.
- McKay, David O. & Evans, Richard L., eds. (June 1966). The Improvement Era. Vol. 69. Salt Lake City: Mutual Improvement Associations of the Church or Jesus Christ of Latter-day Saints.
- McKay, David O. & Evans, Richard L., eds. (July 1966). The Improvement Era. Vol. 69. Salt Lake City: Mutual Improvement Associations of the Church or Jesus Christ of Latter-day Saints.
- McKay, David O. & Evans, Richard L., eds. (August 1966). The Improvement Era. Vol. 69. Salt Lake City: Mutual Improvement Associations of the Church or Jesus Christ of Latter-day Saints.
- McKay, David O. & Evans, Richard L., eds. (September 1966). The Improvement Era. Vol. 69. Salt Lake City: Mutual Improvement Associations of the Church or Jesus Christ of Latter-day Saints.
- McKay, David O. & Evans, Richard L., eds. (October 1966). The Improvement Era. Vol. 69. Salt Lake City: Mutual Improvement Associations of the Church or Jesus Christ of Latter-day Saints.
- McKay, David O. & Evans, Richard L., eds. (November 1966). The Improvement Era. Vol. 69. Salt Lake City: Mutual Improvement Associations of the Church or Jesus Christ of Latter-day Saints.
- McKay, David O. & Evans, Richard L., eds. (December 1966). The Improvement Era. Vol. 69. Salt Lake City: Mutual Improvement Associations of the Church or Jesus Christ of Latter-day Saints.
- McKay, David O. & Evans, Richard L., eds. (February 1967). The Improvement Era. Vol. 70. Salt Lake City: Mutual Improvement Associations of the Church or Jesus Christ of Latter-day Saints.
- McKay, David O. & Evans, Richard L., eds. (April 1967). The Improvement Era. Vol. 70. Salt Lake City: Mutual Improvement Associations of the Church or Jesus Christ of Latter-day Saints.
- McKay, David O. & Evans, Richard L., eds. (December 1967). The Improvement Era. Vol. 70. Salt Lake City: Mutual Improvement Associations of the Church or Jesus Christ of Latter-day Saints.
- McKay, David O. & Evans, Richard L., eds. (February 1968). The Improvement Era. Vol. 71. Salt Lake City: Mutual Improvement Associations of the Church or Jesus Christ of Latter-day Saints.
- McKay, David O. & Evans, Richard L., eds. (March 1968). The Improvement Era. Vol. 71. Salt Lake City: Mutual Improvement Associations of the Church or Jesus Christ of Latter-day Saints.
- McKay, David O. & Evans, Richard L., eds. (April 1968). The Improvement Era. Vol. 71. Salt Lake City: Mutual Improvement Associations of the Church or Jesus Christ of Latter-day Saints.
- McKay, David O. & Evans, Richard L., eds. (September 1968). The Improvement Era. Vol. 71. Salt Lake City: Mutual Improvement Associations of the Church or Jesus Christ of Latter-day Saints.
- McKay, David O. & Evans, Richard L., eds. (January 1969). The Improvement Era. Vol. 72. Salt Lake City: Mutual Improvement Associations of the Church or Jesus Christ of Latter-day Saints.
- McKay, David O. & Evans, Richard L., eds. (September 1969). The Improvement Era. Vol. 72. Salt Lake City: Mutual Improvement Associations of the Church or Jesus Christ of Latter-day Saints.
- McKay, David O. & Evans, Richard L., eds. (December 1969). The Improvement Era. Vol. 72. Salt Lake City: Mutual Improvement Associations of the Church or Jesus Christ of Latter-day Saints.
- McKay, David O. & Evans, Richard L., eds. (January 1970). The Improvement Era. Vol. 73. Salt Lake City: Mutual Improvement Associations of the Church or Jesus Christ of Latter-day Saints.
- Smith, Joseph Fielding & Evans, Richard L., eds. (August 1970). The Improvement Era. Vol. 73. Salt Lake City: Mutual Improvement Associations of the Church or Jesus Christ of Latter-day Saints.
- Smith, Joseph Fielding & Evans, Richard L., eds. (September 1970). The Improvement Era. Vol. 73. Salt Lake City: Mutual Improvement Associations of the Church or Jesus Christ of Latter-day Saints.
