= List of Utah artists =

The following is a list in progress of prominent Utah artists.

Works by famous Utah artists

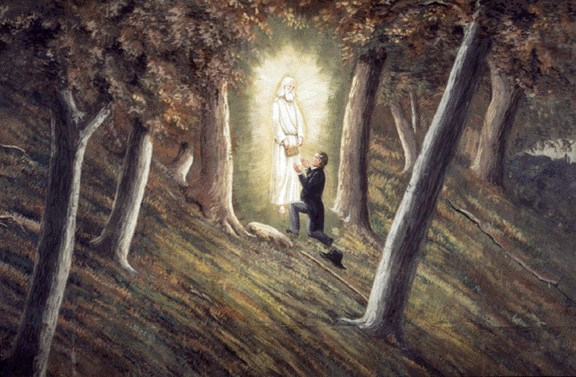
C.C.A. Christensen

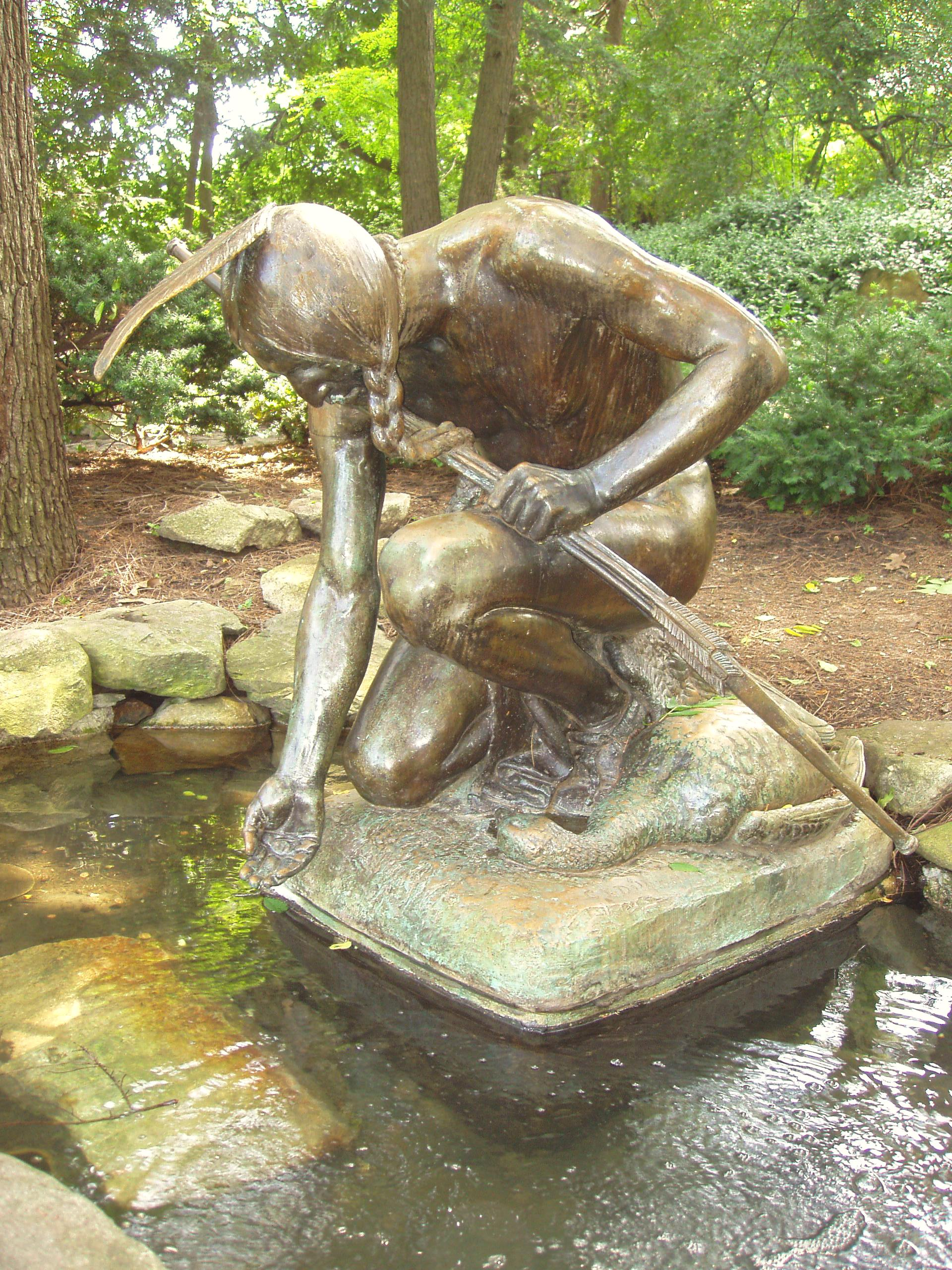
Cyrus E. Dallin

A

- George Edward Anderson, photographer
- Paige Crosland Anderson, painter

B

- Pat Bagley, editorial cartoonist and illustrator
- Earl W. Bascom, sculptor
- Milo Baughman, modern furniture designer
- Anna Campbell Bliss, visual artist and architect
- Solon Borglum, sculptor
- Don Busath, photographer
- Blair Buswell, sculptor

C

- Thomas Battersby Child, Jr., "outsider artist", known for the Gilgal Sculpture Garden
- C. C. A. Christensen, painter
- James C. Christensen, painter, illustrator
- John Willard Clawson, painter
- Henry Lavender Adolphus Culmer, painter

D

- Cyrus Edwin Dallin, sculptor

E

- Edwin Evans, painter

F

- Avard Fairbanks, sculptor
- John B. Fairbanks, painter
- Ortho R. Fairbanks, sculptor
- Dean Fausett, painter
- Lynn Fausett, painter
- Kathryn Jean Finlayson, painter
- Edward J. Fraughton, sculptor
- Arnold Friberg, painter

G

- Alvin Gittens, painter

H

- John Hafen, painter
- James Taylor Harwood, painter

J

- Parker Jacobs, illustrator
- Franz M. Johansen, sculptor/painter

K

- Brian Kershisnik, painter
- Torleif S. Knaphus, sculptor

L

- Alfred Lambourne, painter
- Bryan Larsen, painter

M

- Kenneth C. Madsen, painter
- Paul McCarthy, video/sculptor
- Jon McNaughton, painter
- Miranda Meeks, digital artist

N

O

- George M. Ottinger, painter

P

- Cat Palmer, photographer
- Del Parson, painter
- Kathleen Peterson, painter
- Lorus Pratt, painter

R

- Mary Lou Romney, painter
- Lee Greene Richards, painter

S

- Charles Roscoe Savage, photographer
- Dennis Smith, sculptor
- Sril Art, mural artist
- LeConte Stewart, painter
- Liz Lemon Swindle, painter

T

- Iosua Tai Taeoalii, mixed-media artist
- Debra Teare
- Mary H. Teasdel, impressionist painter
- Minerva Teichert, painter

U

- Ernest Untermann, painter

W

- William W. Ward, stone carver, architect
- Florence Ware, painter
- Kevin Wasden, illustrator
- Stanley J. Watts, sculptor
- Dan Weggeland, painter
- Don Weller, painter

Z

== See also ==
- List of Latter Day Saints: Artists
- List of people from Utah
- Mormon art
- Springville Museum of Art
