= Mary Lou Romney =

American painter (1929–2003)

- Born: February 5, 1929; St. Anthony, Idaho, U.S.
- Died: April 1, 2003 (aged 74); Huntsville, Alabama, U.S.
- Occupation: Painter and Illustrator
- Spouse: Richard Paul Romney
- Parent(s): David Ray Stone and Sarah Nield Hibbert Stone

Mary Lou Romney (February 5, 1929 – April 1, 2003), born Mary Louisa Stone, was an American Painter who resided in Utah. Romney studied art at the University of Utah where she earned a BFA and then completed a Post Graduate Education Certification program. She continued her education at Utah State University where she earned an MFA with a minor in Education. She was a nationally recognized painter and illustrator. She taught briefly at Utah State University, then spent many years teaching at the University of Utah, and was involved in local and regional art organizations, exhibits, and contests.

== Biography ==
Mary Louisa Stone Romney, born in St Anthony, Idaho, 1929, was well-known and recognized among artists and fine art galleries throughout Utah as one of "three of Utah's most renown water colorists"; she received national recognition as an emerging artist through the latter part of the 20th century. In her early college years, Mary Lou embraced creative techniques of master artists and studied under Utah artists LeConte Stewart, Alvin Gittins, and Avard Fairbanks at the University of Utah.

Romney delayed formal studies to marry and raise children. While raising her family she completed a correspondence program in Commercial Art through the Famous Artists School in 1972, then returned to the University in the 1970s. She enrolled in a BFA program at the University of Utah where she studied under many professors who helped shape and refine her skills and interests, such as Alvin Gittins, Robert S. Olpin, Nate Winters, Ed Maryon, and Lennox Tierney. Interested in the interaction between Eastern and Western cultures in art, Mary Lou pursued a detailed study of Notan as her thesis for an MFA degree at Utah State University in the 1980s where she studied under Harrison Groutage, Gaell Lindstrom, Adrian Van Suchtelen, and Marion R. Hyde.

After receiving her MFA from Utah State University, she taught art for the University of Utah. She further developed her interest in Asian art forms after traveling to Taiwan and after becoming acquainted with Chinese artist Ning Yeh, author of The Art of Chinese Brush Painting. As a result, she began to develop techniques using rice paper and watercolors and organized the Ching Hai Oriental Painting Society in Salt Lake City in 1986 Mary Lou Romney collaborated with Hong Kong artist Carrie Koo-Mei in workshop and exhibit entitled "Unfolding Forces" at the Alvin Gittins Gallery at the University of Utah in 1988. Mary Lou established herself "as a painter of floral subjects" eventually teaching students in botanical illustration and Oriental Ink Painting. Romney gained notoriety for her expertise in specialized Oriental watercolor, botanical illustration, paper cutting, and was known as an authority on Oriental Art. Considered to be "one of Utah's top artists" she was selected as juror for the Southern Utah Arts Council Spring Show during the St George Art Festival in 1988, offering additional lectures and demonstrations for the Dixie College Art Department.

Mary Lou explored various media in her work, but was particularly recognized for her watercolor paintings and drawings, receiving various awards and recognitions such as a cash award for "Bromeliads", an award of Excellence from Juror Frank Sanguinetti, the director of the Utah Museum of Fine Arts, and the "Juror's Choice of Excellence Award.". Mary Lou Romney also explored and offered demonstrations of her techniques of Chinese Paper Cutting. Mary Lou was Awarded Signature Status in the Utah Watercolor Society where she had served as president in 1989–90.

=== Marriage and children ===
She married Richard Paul Romney (a first cousin of the politician and businessman George W. Romney) on March 31, 1948, in Salt Lake City, UT. They had five sons and two daughters.

== Published and prominent artistic works ==
Romney, Mary Lou. The Essence of Growing Things. Utah State University. Department of Art, 1987.

"Begonia Fantasy" received Best of Show Award in Springville Art Museum's National April Salon Exhibit in 1986 and is now on permanent display in the Salt Lake County Government Center as part of the Salt Lake County Public Art Collection

Mary Lou designed the Sego Lily Fountain and had 50 of her wildflower sketches etched into sandstone benches at the Red Butte Gardens Arboretum, Salt Lake City, Utah

Mary Lou Romney was the first artist featured in the new Walter P. Cottam Visitor Center (Red Butte Garden, University of Utah Research Park at 300 Wakara Way) - "Frogs, Ferns and Fantasies," botanical paintings and illustrations by Mary Lou Romney through January.

10 years after her death, Mary Lou Romney's artwork was presented at the Walter P. Cottam building as a Posthumous exhibit in 2013 in memorial of Romney's work in the garden's entrance. Adele Flail wrote: "This botanical art exhibit is in honor of Mary Lou Romney, who spent 17 years assisting in the design, implementation, and promotion of Red Butte Garden. Her Sego Lily Fountain design is the most prominent feature as you enter." "In the plaza are carefully placed red sandstone benches which include her wildflower drawings etched into the stone."

Mary Lou's painting "African Violet Tapestry" is purchased by Mary Clark Kimball Johnson then acquired by the Springville Art Museum's permanent collection.

Mary Lou Romney's painting "Cape Primrose" receives regional and national First Place awards

== Honours, decorations, awards and distinctions ==
1988 chosen as one of six "emerging artists" by American Artist Magazine "a successful professional artist worthy of national attention"

== See also ==
- List of Utah artists

== Bibliography ==
Swanson, Vern G., et al. Utah Art. Peregrine Smith Books, 1991.
