= Gordon N. Cope =

American educator and painter

Gordon Nicholson Cope
- Born: May 14, 1906; Salt Lake City, Utah, U.S.
- Died: June 10, 1999 (aged 93); San Francisco, California, U.S.
- Education: Académie Julian
- Occupation: Painter

Gordon N. Cope (May 14, 1906 - June 10, 1999) was an American educator and painter. Trained in Utah and France, he exhibited his landscape paintings and portraits in the United States and Europe, and he believed music was related to painting.

== Life ==
Cope was born on May 14, 1906, in Salt Lake City. He was trained by Utahn artists LeConte Stewart and Lawrence Squires, and at the Académie Julian in Paris, France in 1928. He also studied singing at the Opéra-Comique.

Cope taught art at Latter-day Saints University, and he served as the chair of its Department of Art in 1930–1931. He taught at the Mountain School of Art from 1932 to 1938, and he was the director of the Art Barn School in Salt Lake City in 1939–1941. Cope painted Utahn landscapes as well as a portrait of Henry H. Blood, who served as the seventh governor of Utah from 1933 to 1941. Cope exhibited his work in the United States and Europe. According to the Deseret News, Cope "felt that music and painting are closely interrelated, and that the study of one form may be used to complement the appreciation and understanding of the other."

Cope died on June 10, 1999, in San Francisco, California.
