= E. Keith Eddington =

American painter

- Born: Elmo Keith Eddington; July 19, 1923; Philadelphia, Pennsylvania, U.S.
- Died: November 18, 2007 (aged 84); Salt Lake City, Utah, U.S.
- Education: University of Utah; Chicago Academy of Fine Arts
- Known for: Graphic design Portrait painting
- Notable work: Large painting of Jesus Christ that hangs in the Joseph Smith Memorial Building at Temple Square in Salt Lake City, Utah

Elmo Keith Eddington (July 19, 1923 – November 18, 2007) was an American artist and graphic designer from Utah. He fought in World War II. He was a professor at the University of Utah, and later at Brigham Young University. He is noted for his portraiture and for his large painting of Jesus Christ that hangs in the Joseph Smith Memorial Building at Temple Square in Salt Lake City, Utah.

== Early life ==
Elmo Keith Eddington was born on July 19, 1923, in Philadelphia, Pennsylvania, to Elmo Eddington and Rhea Felt. His father was a doctor and he grew up in Lehi, Utah. As a young man he participated in boxing and learned to play the cornet. Eddington served in the 86th Infantry Division, known as the Blackhawks, during World War II. He served in the European and Pacific theaters. During the war, he worked with military intelligence and helped draw maps and other items to assist in the war effort.

After returning home, Eddington attended the University of Utah and took pre-med courses. However, after meeting Arnold Friberg in France, he decided to pursue art. Friberg later came to teach at the university. Eddington studied art under LeConte Stewart, Alvin Gittins, and Friberg. He graduated in 1950 with a Master of Fine Arts. He later attended the Chicago Academy of Fine Arts.

== Career ==
Eddington was part of the faculty at the University of Utah. He began teaching in 1952, and remained at the university for 17 years. He taught graphic design, illustration, figure drawing, and painting, along with other courses. Eddington became their lead commercial-art teacher. He left, however, to pursue his professional art career. Eddington taught at Brigham Young University in 1980.

Eddington was the co-owner of Circuit & Eddington, which was an agency devoted to advertising and public relations. He later opened up his own design studio, Keith Eddington & Associates. His firm became one of the most respected graphic design firms in Utah. He retired in 1989 from his professional career, and built a studio where he could paint portraits. Eddington believed that portraiture was the true test of an artist. If he could not get a long sitting with a client, he would take a series of photographs in order to make a realistic portrait. He also thought that the true test of a portrait artist was how well they could paint hands.

During his career he had designed and illustrated for clients such as Cadillac, Transamerica, and Motorola. He was also a consultant for the agencies IBM and Pillsbury. He made portraits for Norman H. Bangerter, a Utah governor, and Heidi Friberg, Arnold Friberg's wife.

== Church contributions ==
Eddington was a member of the Church of Jesus Christ of Latter-day Saints (LDS Church) and served in various responsibilities. He was asked to design the hymnal currently used by the church by Thomas S. Monson. The hymn book was published in 1985. He also made a painting of Jesus Christ that is now displayed in the Joseph Smith Memorial Building at Temple Square in Salt Lake City, Utah. The painting—which hangs in the Legacy Theater—is nine feet high and six and a half feet wide. He was asked to make the painting by Gordon B. Hinckley. Eddington finished the oil painting in only one year. Eddington was also commissioned in December 1983 to make a portrait of Thomas S. Monson.

== Personal life ==
Eddington married June Anderson on June 30, 1944, in Alexandria, Louisiana. The couple was later sealed in the Salt Lake Temple on November 3, 1959. The couple had seven children together. Eddington died in his home on November 18, 2007.
