= Henry Lavender Adolphus Culmer =

British-American painter

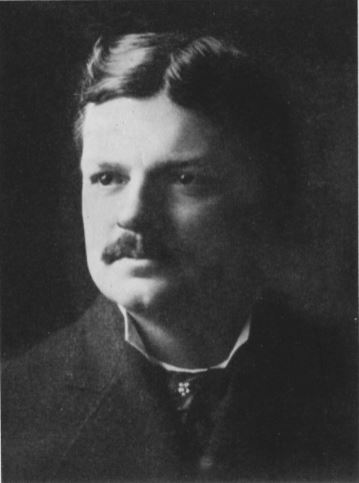
H. L. A. Culmer (date unknown)

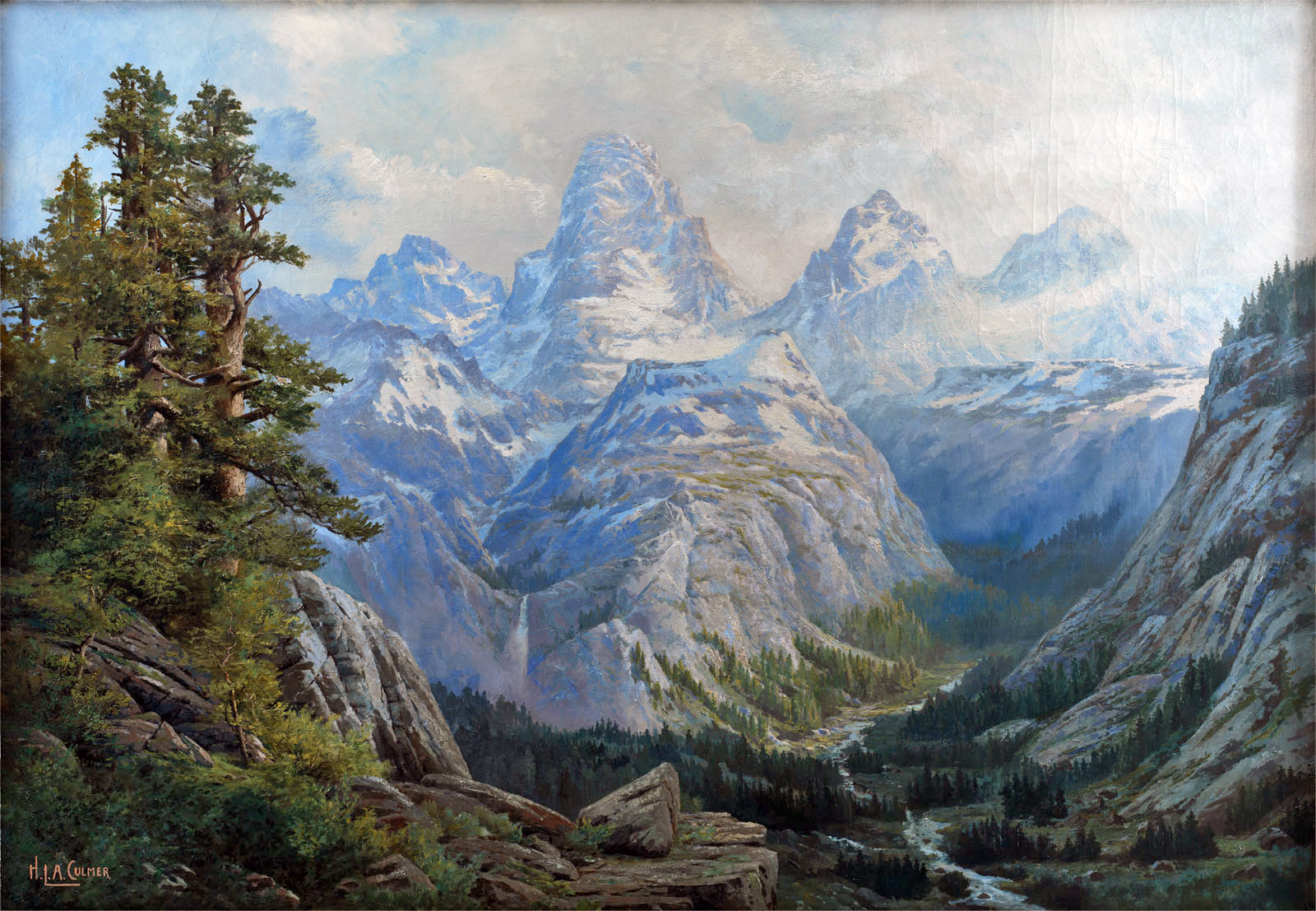
The Three Tetons

Henry Lavender Adolphus Culmer (25 March 1854 – 10 February 1914) was a painter, scientist, illustrator, and educator.

== Biography ==
He was born in Davington, England. During his younger days there, he worked as an errand boy in a print shop in London. His family joined the Church of Jesus Christ of Latter-day Saints and in 1868, immigrated to the United States.

Although he was mostly a self-taught artist, he attended the University of Utah (previously known as the University of Deseret) in the 1870s and studied with landscape painters Reuben Kirkham and Alfred Lambourne. During this same time, he also met and was influenced by Thomas Moran.

He painted landscapes and was best known for his panoramic views of the mountains and deserts. He was the first artist to explore and depict the natural bridges in southern Utah as well as the interior of Alaska. He also painted Monument Valley, the Grand Canyon, the coast of Monterey, and mountain ranges including the Teton Range and the Wasatch Range. He believed that mountains were "the most noble subject for an artists' brush." With his love of science and intense self-study, he had a deep knowledge of and admiration for nature that was noticeable in his paintings. He was especially skilled at depicting topographical details and rock formations.

In addition to his artistic activities, he worked as an associate editor for the Provo Enquirer, provided articles and illustrations for Western Galaxy Magazine, and operated a printing and publishing business. Together with his brothers, he ran a company that provided stone for some of Salt Lake City's public structures, including the City and County Building and the Post Office.

His works appear in the collections of the Utah Museum of Fine Arts, the Utah State Capitol Building, the Utah Historical Society, and the Springville Museum of Art.
