= Kenneth C. Madsen =

American artist (1927–2002)

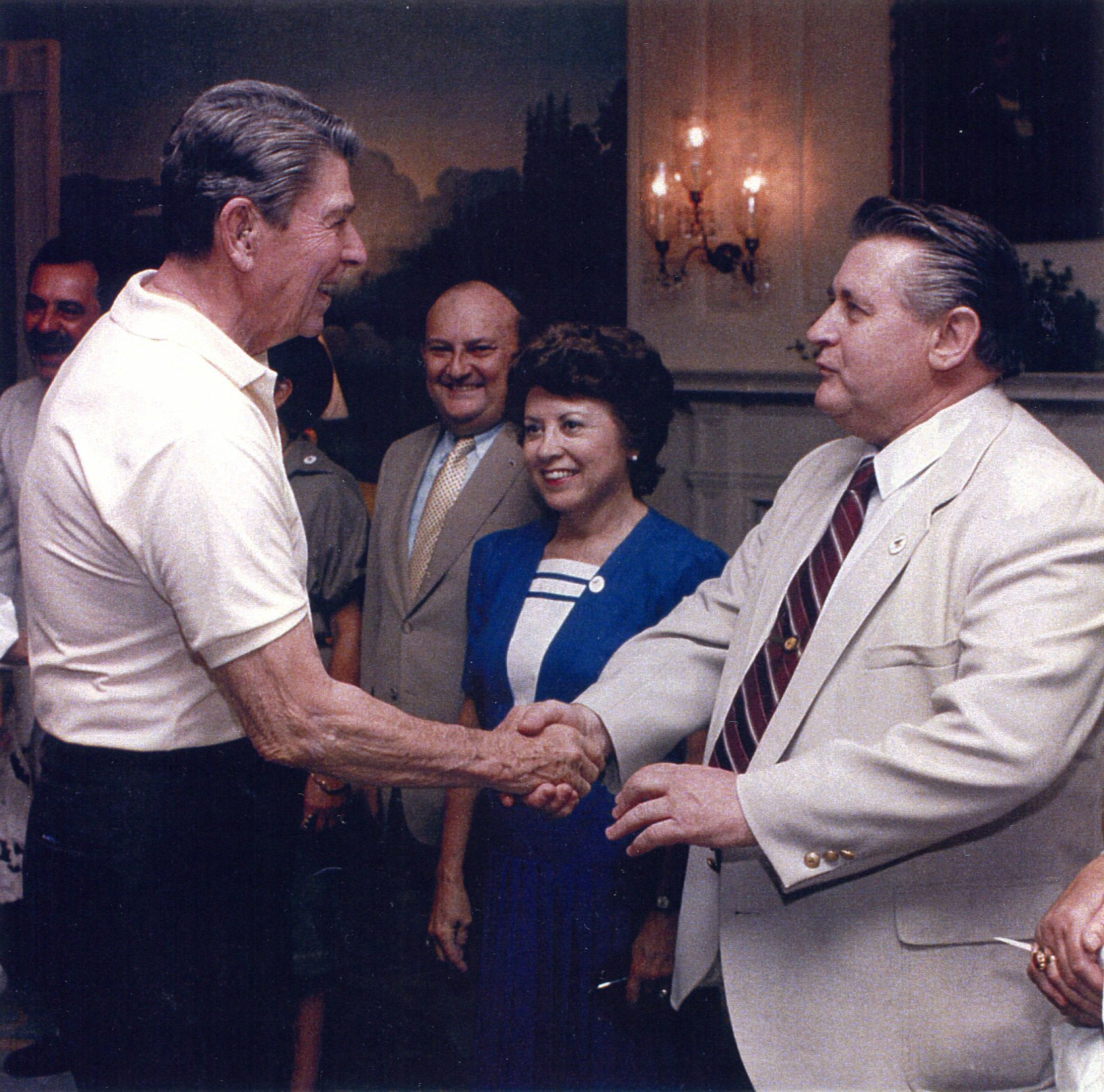
- Madsen shaking hands with U.S. President Ronald Reagan
- Born: Kenneth Cleon Madsen; October 31, 1927; Salt Lake City, Utah, U.S.
- Died: December 25, 2002; Salt Lake City, Utah, U.S.
- Known for: Oil Painting
- Notable work: Discovery

"Discovery," painted in 1991, is his most famous work.

Kenneth C. Madsen (October 31, 1927 – December 25, 2002) was an American artist. He was the son of a Danish immigrant father and a mother who influenced his interest in the arts. His most famous work is his 1991 painting, "Discovery," a representation of the voyage of Christopher Columbus. The painting graced the program cover of the National Independence Day Festival and Parade in Washington, D.C. In celebration of the Columbus Quincentennial, Utah’s governor Norman H. Bangerter joined the parade organization in presenting the original painting to U.S. President George H. W. Bush for his future Presidential library collection.

== Biography ==
Beginning at age three Kenneth showed a great interest in visual art. When he was seven years old, he met photographer Ida M. Wilcox, who encouraged him to pursue his artistic talent. On her retirement, she bequeathed to him her multi-adjustable easel and chair.

Deseret News art critic Richard P. Christenson wrote the following: "After high school, Kenneth joined the Navy and sailed extensively among the South Pacific islands. This gave him ample opportunities to sketch boats, islands, and the many moods of the ocean." In 1945 he won first prize for six pastel paintings that he entered in the Army-Navy-Marine art show, sponsored by the USO in San Diego.

After completing his military service, Kenneth entered school at the Art Barn in Salt Lake City where for nine years he studied fine art and commercial art under the direction of some of Utah’s finest artists. The following art teachers influenced his early studies: Michael Cannon, Lorin Folland, Dan Lahey, Lee Dussell, and Gertrude Teutsch.

In addition to his studies at the Art Barn, Kenneth completed art courses with the Famous Artists School of Westport, Connecticut. In 1949 he was encouraged to enter a painting in the Junior League Art Show, where he won his first cash prize. About that time, his instructor, Michael Cannon, helped him obtain his first mural commission, which launched his career in fine art.

Between commissions, Kenneth worked in commercial art and advertising, selling his work to restaurants, car dealerships, banks, pharmacies, medical centers, and schools.

On rare occasions Kenneth exhibited his paintings at private art shows and in local art galleries, including an exhibit at the Reno Little Theater in Nevada and another at the Panache Restaurant in Draper, Utah.

In 1972 Kenneth became staff artist and art history course coordinator for International Exchange School in Salt Lake City. He prepared their art course syllabus. He conducted several art studio workshops aboard cruise ships on the Mediterranean Sea. He was asked by the Greek Epirotiki Cruise Line to teach art aboard the T.S.S. Hermes. He also taught art classes aboard the Regina Prima and on the Romanza cruise ships. In addition, he conducted art workshops at the Collegio Alla Querce and other college campuses in Europe. Furthermore, his art appreciation tours to the Queen Mary College of South Woodford, England, attracted several students. During these years of European travel he also served on the Board of Directors for the House of Fine Arts, Provo, Utah.

Kenneth’s art encompassed a range of canvas sizes – from minute images of cellular amoeba to large murals, including a 12 x 90 foot mural of Lake Tahoe for a marine dealership. And he painted a large variety of subjects, including still-life, architecture, character renditions, and wildlife. But it was his free-flowing Western mountain scenes and powerful seascapes that captured the attention of scores of collectors. His paintings hang in churches, libraries, restaurants, doctor’s offices, department stores, country clubs, and schools. Private owners of his works include the late Alex Haley. Kenneth’s oil painting, "From Dugouts to Spires," hangs in the South Jordan City Hall. Another painting, a pastoral scene, hangs in Utah’s Draper City Hall.
