= Lawrence Squires =

American painter

- Born: March 14, 1887; Salt Lake City, Utah, U.S.
- Died: January 28, 1928 (aged 40); Salt Lake City, Utah, U.S.
- Resting place: Salt Lake City Cemetery
- Education: Art Students League of New York
- Occupation: Painter

Lawrence Squires (March 14, 1887 - January 28, 1928) was an American painter. His artwork can be seen at the Denver Art Museum, the Springville Museum of Art, and the Utah State Capitol.

== Life ==
Squires was born on March 14, 1887, in Salt Lake City, Utah. To pay for his artistic education, he worked as a barber like many of his relatives. Squires was a member of the Church of Jesus Christ of Latter-day Saints, he served his mission in Europe in 1907–1910. He briefly served in World War I.

Squires was trained as a painter by Mahonri Young in Utah, and by Kenneth Hayes Miller and Boardman Robinson at the Art Students League of New York. He painted in Salt Lake City, except for 1924 when he lived in Tucson, Arizona. According to the Utah Artists Project, "his technically proficient and sensitive style is well regarded in Utah art."

Squires died on January 18, 1928, and he was buried in the Salt Lake City Cemetery. His paintings can be seen at the Denver Art Museum, the Springville Museum of Art, and the Utah State Capitol.
