= Kathryn Jean Finlayson =

American artist

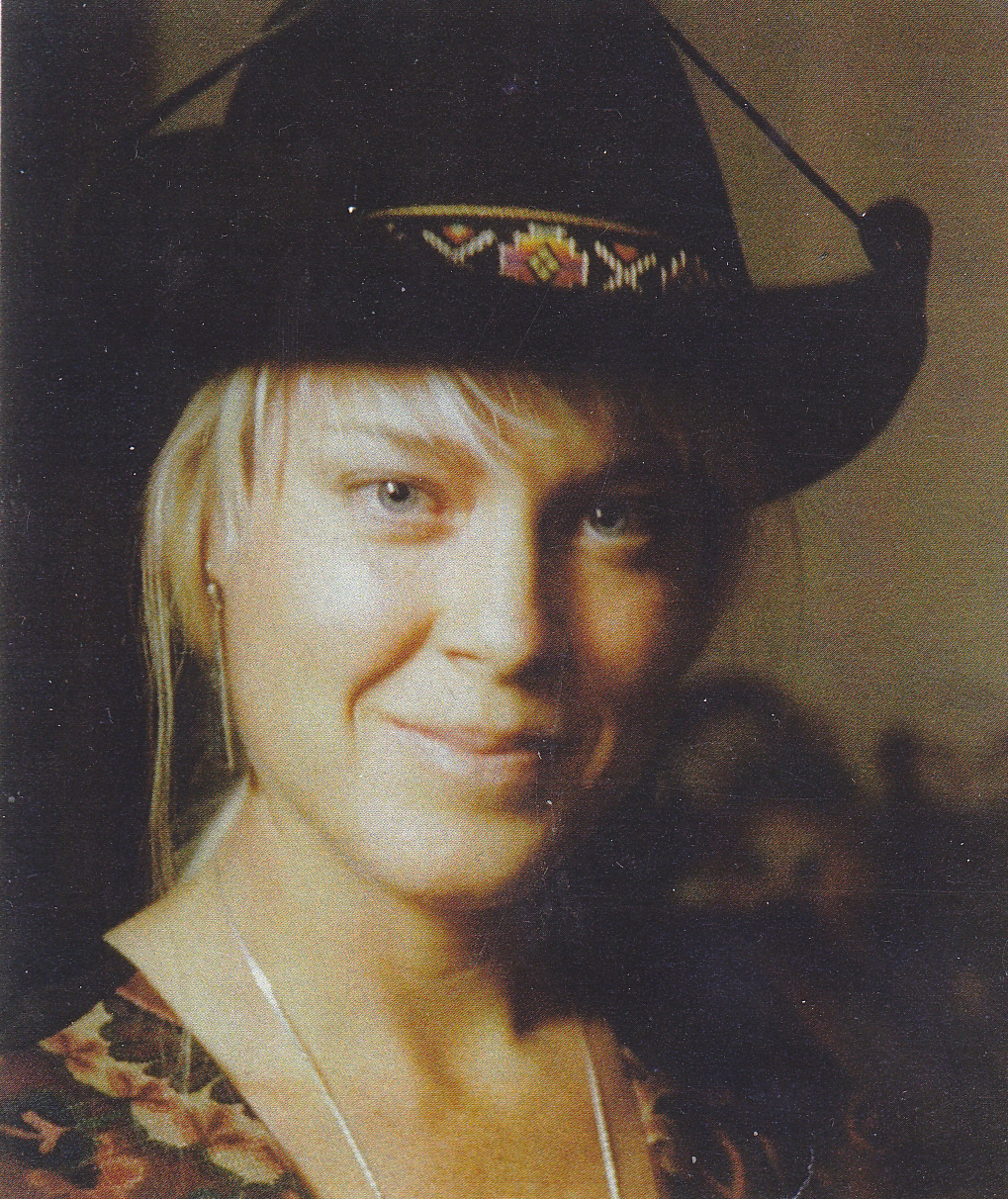
- Born: 14 February 1953; Denver, Colorado, U.S.
- Occupation: Artist

Kathryn Jean Finlayson (born 14 February 1953) is an artist from Salt Lake City, Utah. She is primarily known for her surrealistic paintings, which feature a diversity of styles and subject, including fantastic conceptualization of landscapes and animals, particularly horses. She stated " The ideas for my art come from dreams and imagination, and sometimes from impressions of memories of childhood." Her media is primarily oil paint.

Finlayson was born in Denver, Colorado. Her family eventually moved to Utah, where she studied art at Westminster College under Don Doxey. She graduated with a Bachelor of Arts degree in 1978. After concluding her education, she traveled extensively in Europe, Canada, and Mexico, where many influences contributed to the evolution of her unique style.

Finlayson has had several one-person shows, and has participated in several group shows, including the 84th, 85th, and 89th annual Spring Salon show at the Springville Museum of Art.

== Gallery ==
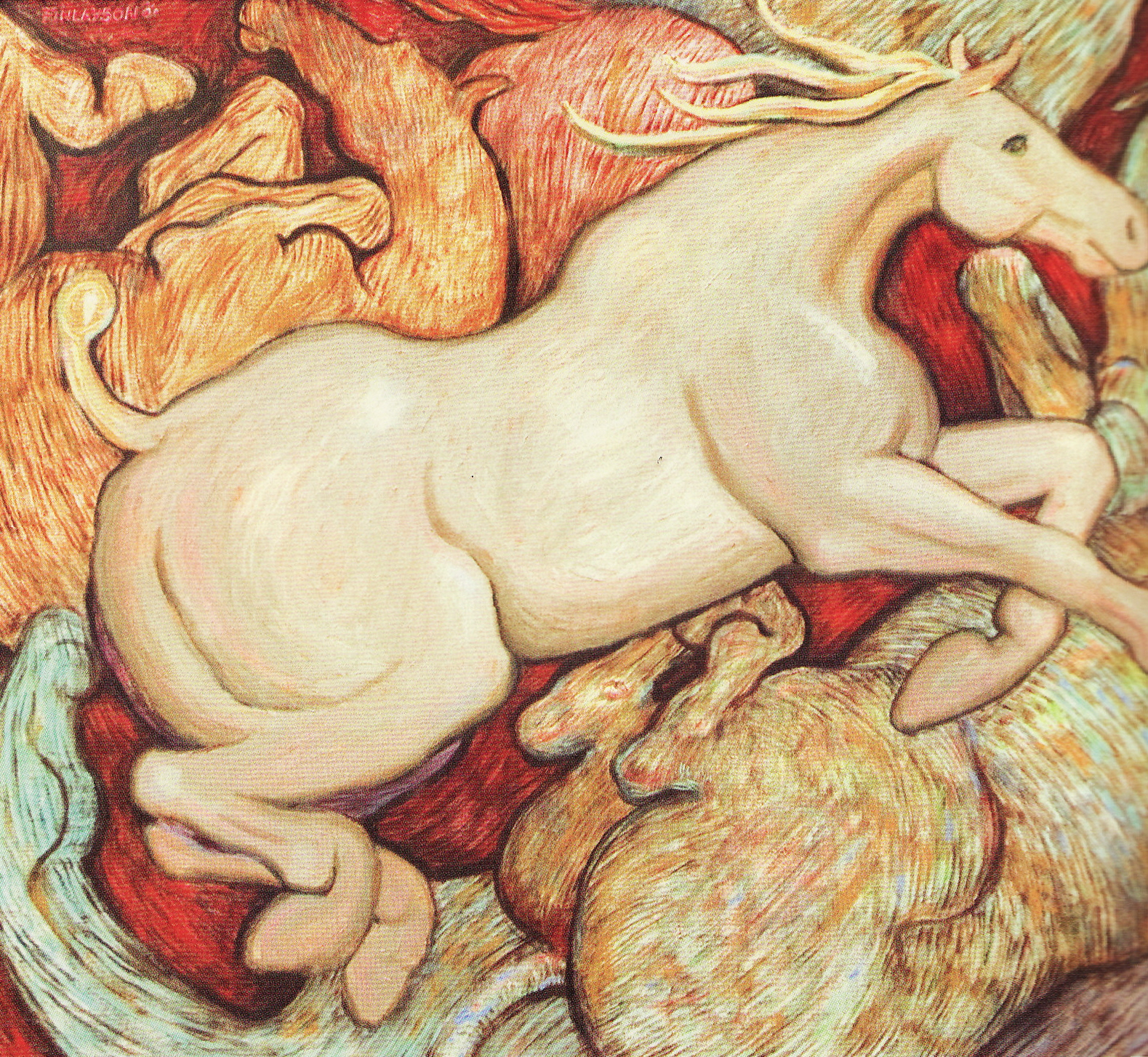
Cameo Dance, 2010

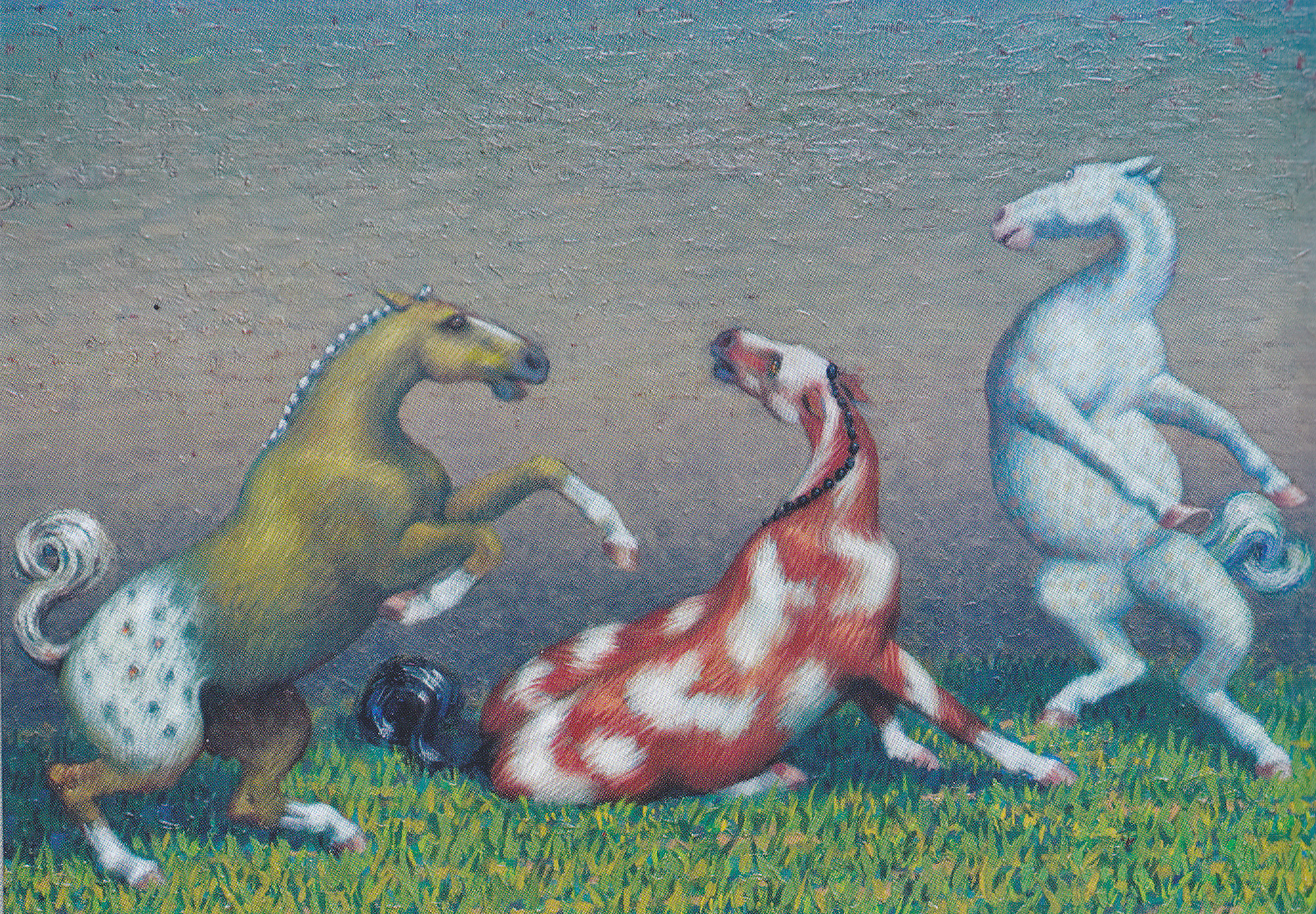
Slam Dancing, 1984

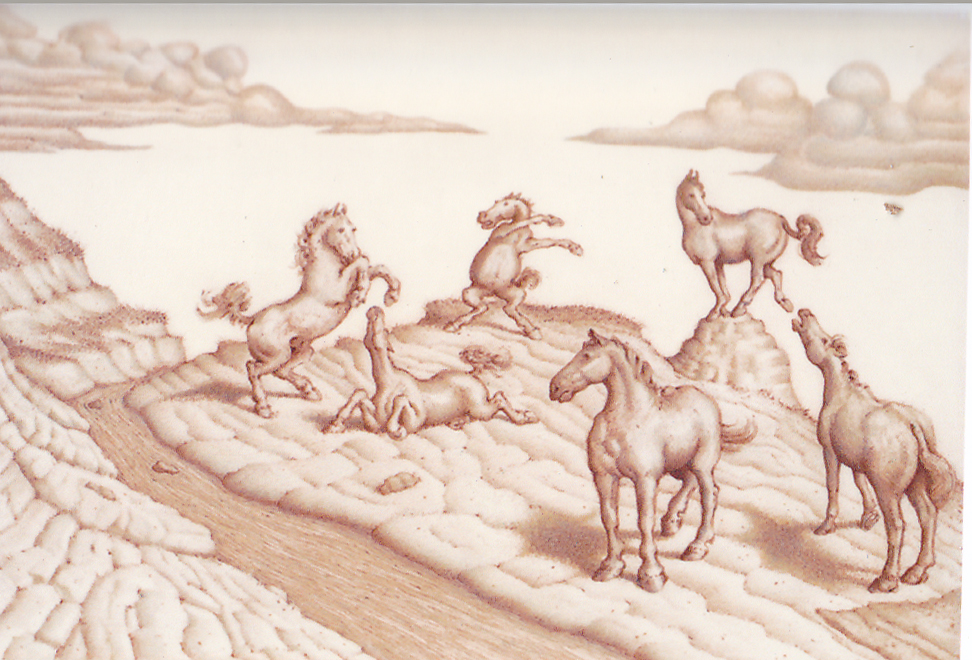
Mud Flats, 1998

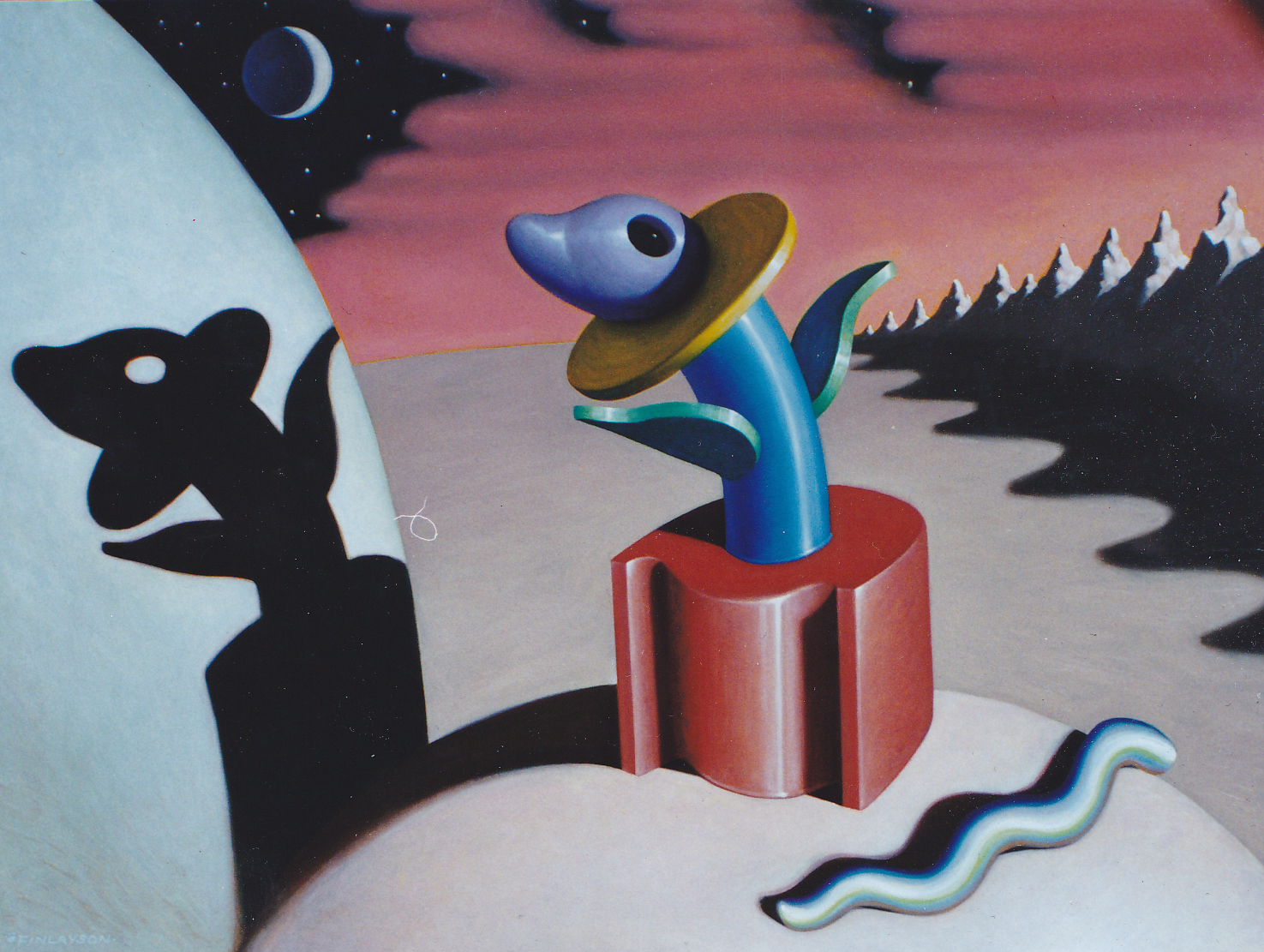
Marsscape, 2001

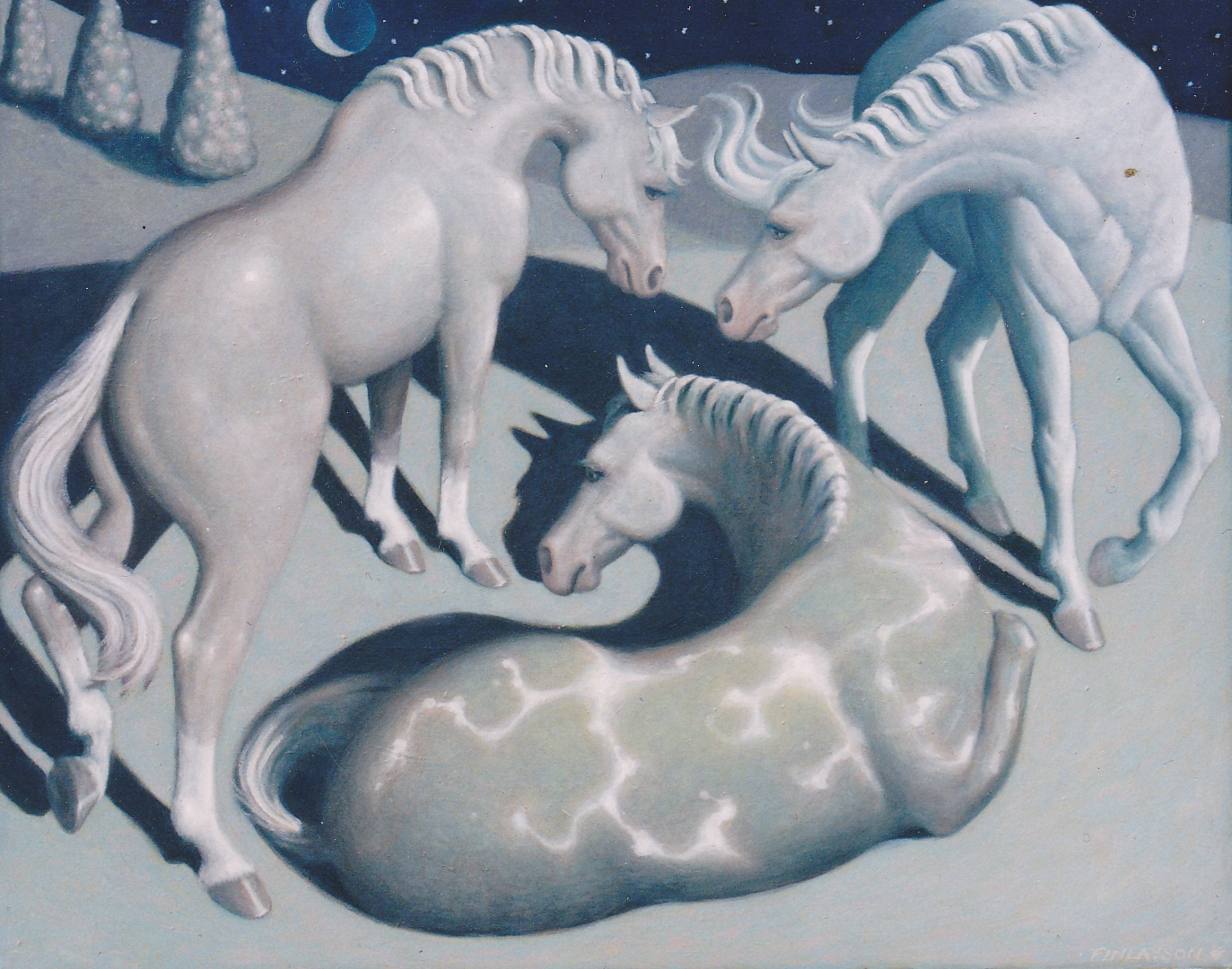
Moonscape, 1990

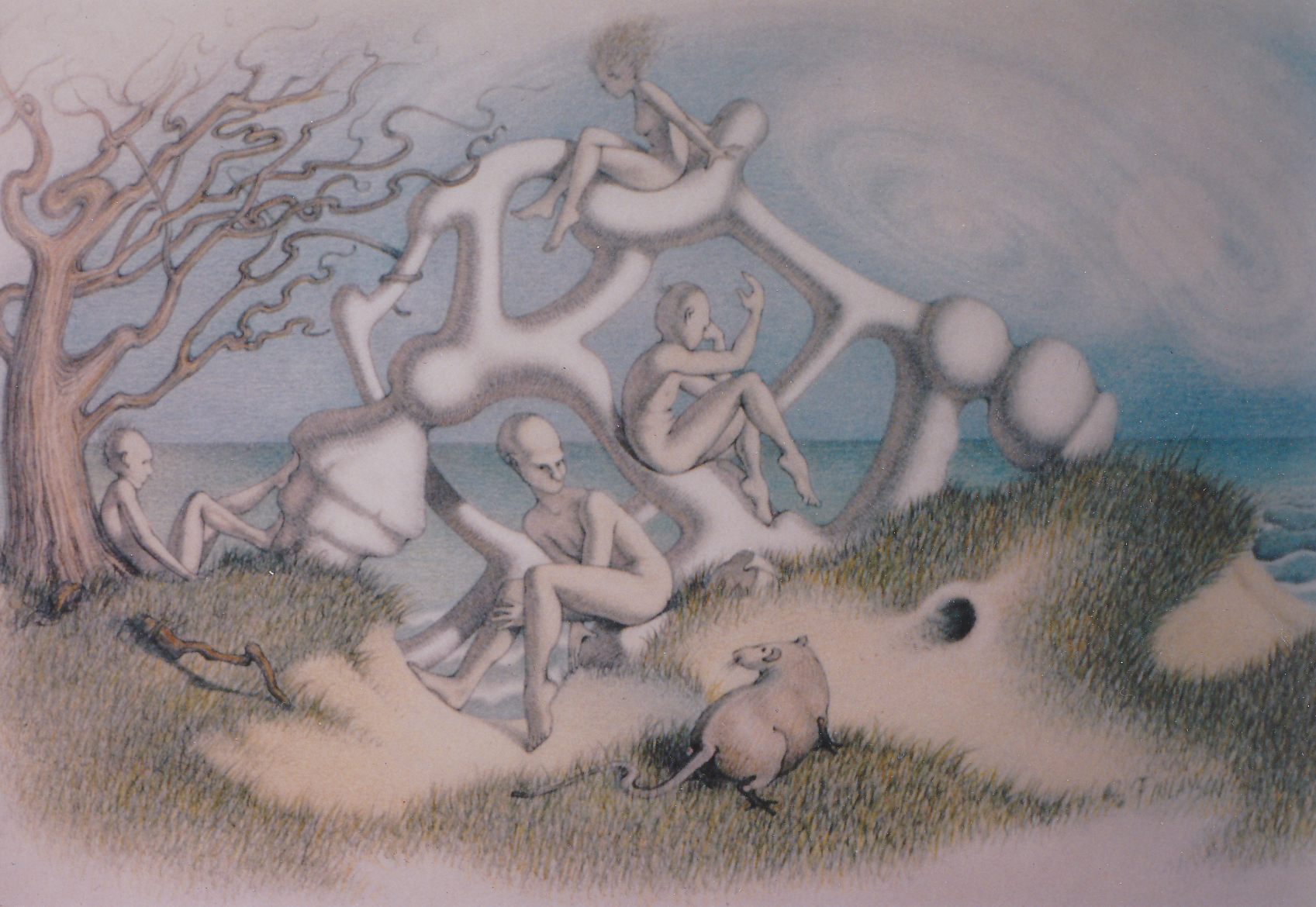
Neuter People, 1986
