= Reuben Kirkham =

American painter

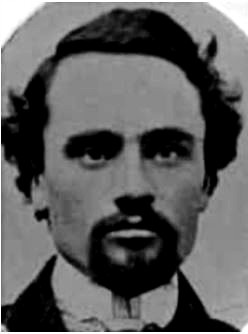
Reuben Kirkham

Reuben John Kirkham (13 October 1845, Spalding, Lincolnshire - 17 April 1886, Logan, Utah) was an American landscape painter.

== Biography ==
His family emigrated to the United States while he was still a child. His sister, Ann, married a member of the LDS Church and, eventually, the entire family converted. Various problems kept them from reaching the Salt Lake Valley for almost a decade, but they finally arrived in 1868.

The gift of a paint box several years earlier had given him the desire to become an artist, and he taught himself while performing odd jobs. After a time of wandering, he made friends with the painter, Alfred Lambourne, a fellow Englishman, and they painted scenes for the Lehi Music Hall. Many of his later landscapes would contain imaginary features. A trip back East in 1874, with the intent of taking formal lessons, ended with his money being stolen.

In 1876, he married Echo Levinia Squires (1856–1943), from an early pioneer family. They had five children.

Inspired by his early theatrical work, he began creating panoramas. The first, created together with Lambourne, featured scenery from throughout the United States. Later, he spent two years (1883–1885) touring Utah with a nineteen scene panorama, based on episodes and places from the Book of Mormon. The presentation included live performances.

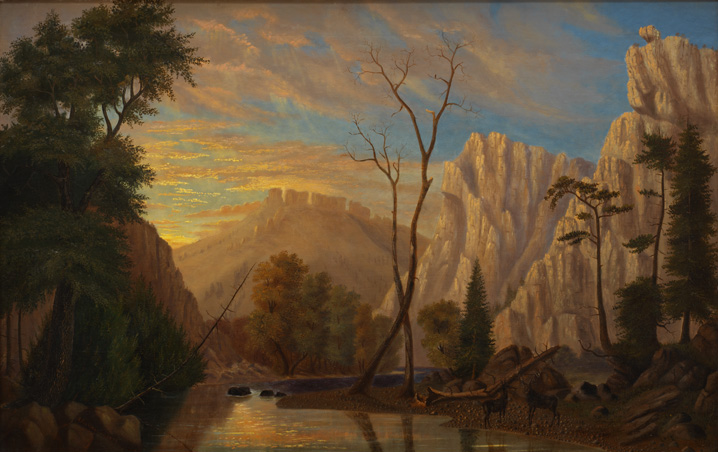
Sunset, Blacksmith Fork Canyon (near Hyrum, Utah)

Never in very good health, he died in 1886 from what was officially diagnosed as "typhoid pneumonia". Echo maintained that he died from exposure to the chemicals in his paints.
