= Bob Camblin =

American artist

- Born: August 1, 1928
- Died: December 4, 2010 (aged 82)
- Movement: Post-Impressionism, Abstract Impressionism

Bob Bilyeu Camblin (August 1, 1928 – December 4, 2010) was an American artist active in the 1970s Houston Art Scene. Over his lifetime, Camblin created more than 2,400 artworks, including paintings, drawings, and watercolors. many of which were hidden by Camblin to be rediscovered many years later.

== Early life and education ==
Camblin was born in Ponca City, Oklahoma, into a family of artists. His parents, Don and Viva Camblin, were artists who introduced him to various mediums from a young age. During high school, he continued making art and served as the art director for the school yearbook. Following graduation, Camblin briefly served in the U.S. Army and spent time in the Air Force Reserve before enrolling at the Kansas City Art Institute, where he earned a Bachelor and Master of Fine Arts, completing his graduate studies in 1955. In the same year, he was awarded a Fulbright Fellowship, which enabled him to study in Italy for a year.

During this time, he was deeply influenced by the art and architecture he encountered, particularly the collections at the Uffizi Gallery in Florence and the Capuchin Catacombs in Palermo. Exposure to Byzantine and late Medieval structures, along with the works of major European masters, contributed to the development of recurring motifs in his work—most notably skull imagery. Upon returning to the United States in 1958, his artworks from his stay in Italy were exhibited at the Art Institute of Chicago.

== Career ==
In the 1960s, Camblin moved to Houston, Texas, where he accepted a teaching position at Rice University. He also taught in various institutions, including the Ringling School of Art, University of Illinois, University of Detroit, and University of Utah. At Rice University he met fellow artist Earl Staley; they began sharing studio space and occasionally collaborated on artistic projects and public events, often inspired by Dadaist ideals.

Camblin's early work was informed by European modernism, but his style evolved through the 1970s into a more conceptual and performative direction. As his frustration with the commercial art world grew, he began experimenting with identity and authorship by adopting multiple artistic aliases. These included "Anonymous Bosch", "anonymous box company", and "ABC" (an acronym for "Another Bob Camblin"). He also performed under personas such as "Red Stick the Pirate" and "Mr. Peanut", using these pseudonyms to obscure authorship and explore themes of perception, authorship, and market reception. Despite his resistance to the commercialization of his work, Camblin was selected to exhibit in the well-regarded Fresh Paint: The Houston School exhibition at the Museum of Fine Arts, Houston in 1985. Notably, he was the only participating artist who refused to provide a written statement to accompany his work, a move consistent with his skepticism of institutional framing.

=== Mouches Volantes ===
In 1980, Camblin developed Mouches Volantes, a painting style that played on the interaction between optical illusions and the viewer's perception. This technique, influenced by artists such as M.C. Escher and Marcel Duchamp, sought to create larger perceptions from familiar objects through abstract brushstrokes. His work invited viewers to engage with the paintings beyond the surface, piecing together a narrative based on their optical experiences.

=== Major works ===
Some of Camblin's notable works include:

- Big Al: Electric Age, an example of his Mouches Volantes technique, where he blurred the line between abstract shapes and perceptual reality.
- The Marionette, one of his early works reflecting his Catholic upbringing and existential themes.
- Descent From The Cross, a pen and ink drawing depicting the crucified Christ being lowered from the cross, his lifeless body held by Joseph of Arimathea and Nicodemus.

=== Collaborations and exhibitions ===
Throughout his career, Camblin participated in several notable exhibitions, including:

- Fulbright Artists Exhibition (Rome, 1957)
- Bob Camblin: A Houston Retrospective 1968-84 (Midtown Art Center Houston, Texas, 1984)
- Fresh Paint: The Houston School (1985), where he was the only artist featured without a written statement.

His works were exhibited at institutions such as the Museum of Fine Arts (Houston), Whitney Museum of American Art, and the Akron Art Institute.

== Personal life ==
In the late 1970s, Camblin left his teaching career and relocated first to Oregon and later to Louisiana, where he continued to paint with his wife, fellow artist Nancy Giordano Echegoyen, until his death in 2010. In Louisiana, he continued to produce art outside of institutional frameworks. Despite his withdrawal from academic and commercial art circles, his work continued to be exhibited in established venues such as the Galveston Art Center, the Modern Art Museum of Fort Worth, and the Menil Collection in Houston.

His legacy is characterized by an insistence on creative autonomy, a rejection of art market conventions, and a persistent interest in viewer engagement through perceptual ambiguity.

While not widely known to mainstream audiences, Camblin has garnered scholarly interest for his contribution to experimental art practices in the United States. His use of alter egos, engagement with Dadaist techniques, and subversion of authorship align him with postmodern currents that questioned the role of the artist and the institution alike. "At once a mystic, an artiste, and a provocateur, Camblin layered his watercolors, pool paintings, drawings, and prints with hidden meanings, painstaking detail, and tongue-in-cheek humor."
