= Robert S. Olpin =

American art historian

Robert Spencer Olpin
- Born: August 30, 1940; Palo Alto, California, U.S.
- Died: November 5, 2005 (aged 65)
- Resting place: Murray City Cemetery
- Education: Palo Alto High School; University of Utah; Boston University
- Occupation: Art historian
- Spouse: Mary Florence Reynolds
- Children: 4 daughters

Robert S. Olpin (August 30, 1940 - November 5, 2005) was an American art historian. He was a professor of Art History at the University of Utah, and the (co-)author of several books.

== Life ==
Olpin was born on August 30, 1940, in Palo Alto, California. He graduated from Palo Alto High School in 1958, followed by the University of Utah, where he bachelor's degree in 1963, and Boston University, where he earned master's degree in 1965 and a PhD from Boston University in 1971.

Olpin was a professor of Art History at his alma mater, the University of Utah, for 38 years. He was also the department chair, and the dean of its College of Fine Arts. He (co-)authored several books about Utah art, especially sculpture and paintings. One of his books is about George S. Dibble, another University of Utah professor who was also a painter and a critic. In his spare time, Opin was the co-director of the Utah Fine Arts Institute and the president of Associated Art Historians, Inc., two non-profit organizations.

Olpin was a member of the Church of Jesus Christ of Latter-day Saints, and he was sealed to his wife, née Mary Florence Reynolds, in the Oakland California Temple in 1964; they had gotten married in Boston in 1963. The couple had four daughters. Olpin died on November 5, 2005, at age 65.

== Selected works ==
- Olpin, Robert S. (1980). Dictionary of Utah Art. Salt Lake City, Utah: Salt Lake Art Center. OCLC 6134403.
- Olpin, Robert S. (1988). George Dibble: Painter, Teacher, Critic: Paintings 1928-1988. Salt Lake City, Utah: Utah Museum of Fine Arts. OCLC 30937267.
- Swanson, Vern G.; Olpin, Robert S.; Seifrit, William C. (1997). Utah Painting and Sculpture. Salt Lake City, Utah: Gibbs Smith. ISBN 9780879058173. OCLC 36543531.
- Olpin, Robert S.; Seifrit, William C.; Swanson, Vern G. (1999). Artists of Utah. Salt Lake City, Utah: Gibbs Smith. ISBN 9780879059057. OCLC 40668305.
- Olpin, Robert S.; Rugh, Thomas F. (2006). Painters of the Wasatch Mountains. Salt Lake City Utah: Gibbs Smith. ISBN 9781586858506. OCLC 62344613.
