= Bountiful Davis Art Center =

Art center in Bountiful, Utah

Coordinates: 40°53′25″N 111°52′49″W

The Bountiful Davis Art Center is an art center created in 1974. It is based in the city of Bountiful, Utah.

Bountiful City and the University of Utah collaborated to establish the Bountiful Davis Art Center. The BDAC became a nonprofit organization in 1984.

They have been based in 90 N Main St., Bountiful, UT since 2015.

The art center organize public art exhibitions, art and theater classes for children and adults, and events, including the folk arts festival, Summerfest International.

The Summerfest International Art & Folk Festival is a free weekend event, held the first week in August at Bountiful City Park with live music and dance performances, ethnic food trucks, and artist booths.

== Exhibitions (selection) ==
- 2022: Urban Pop: Curated by Todd Marshall
- 2022: Traces of the West
- 2020: DOORs1
- 2019: Annual Davis School District Student Exhibit
- 2018: Echoes of a Morning Star
