= Alfred Lambourne =

American painter and author

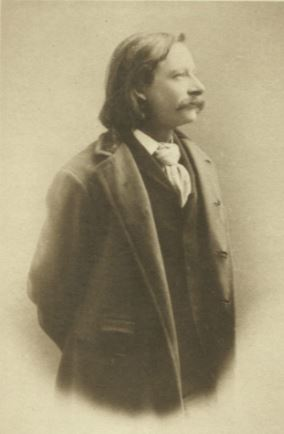
Alfred Lambourne (c.1890)

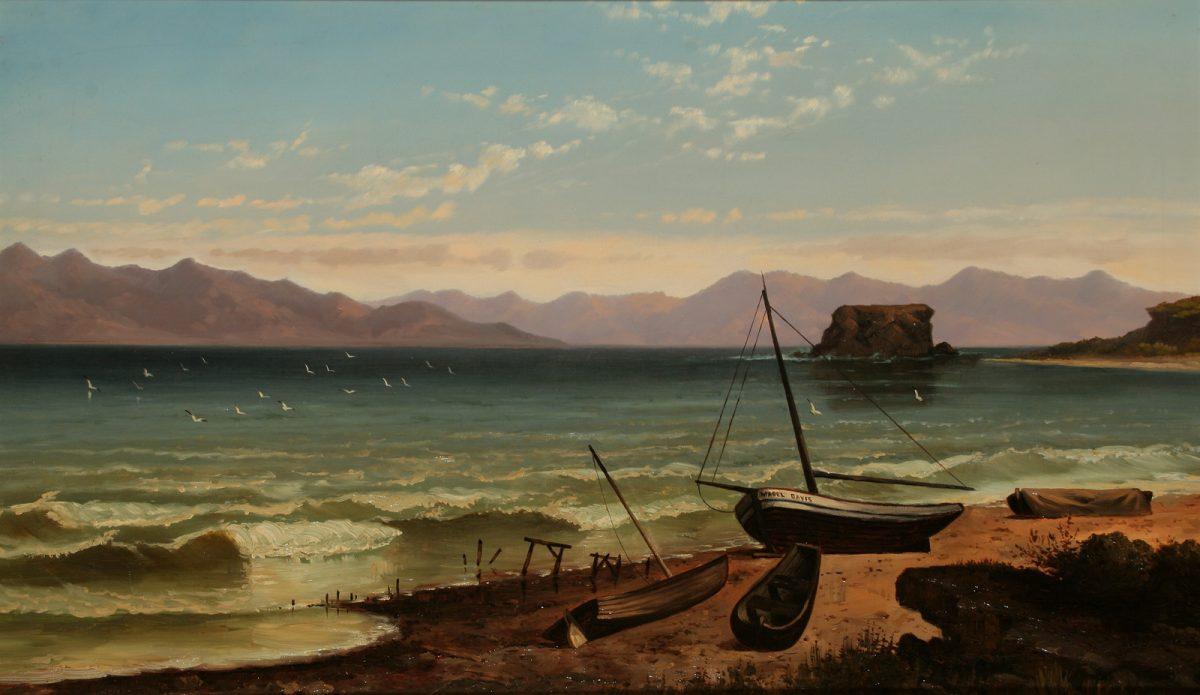
View of the Great Salt Lake by Lambourne

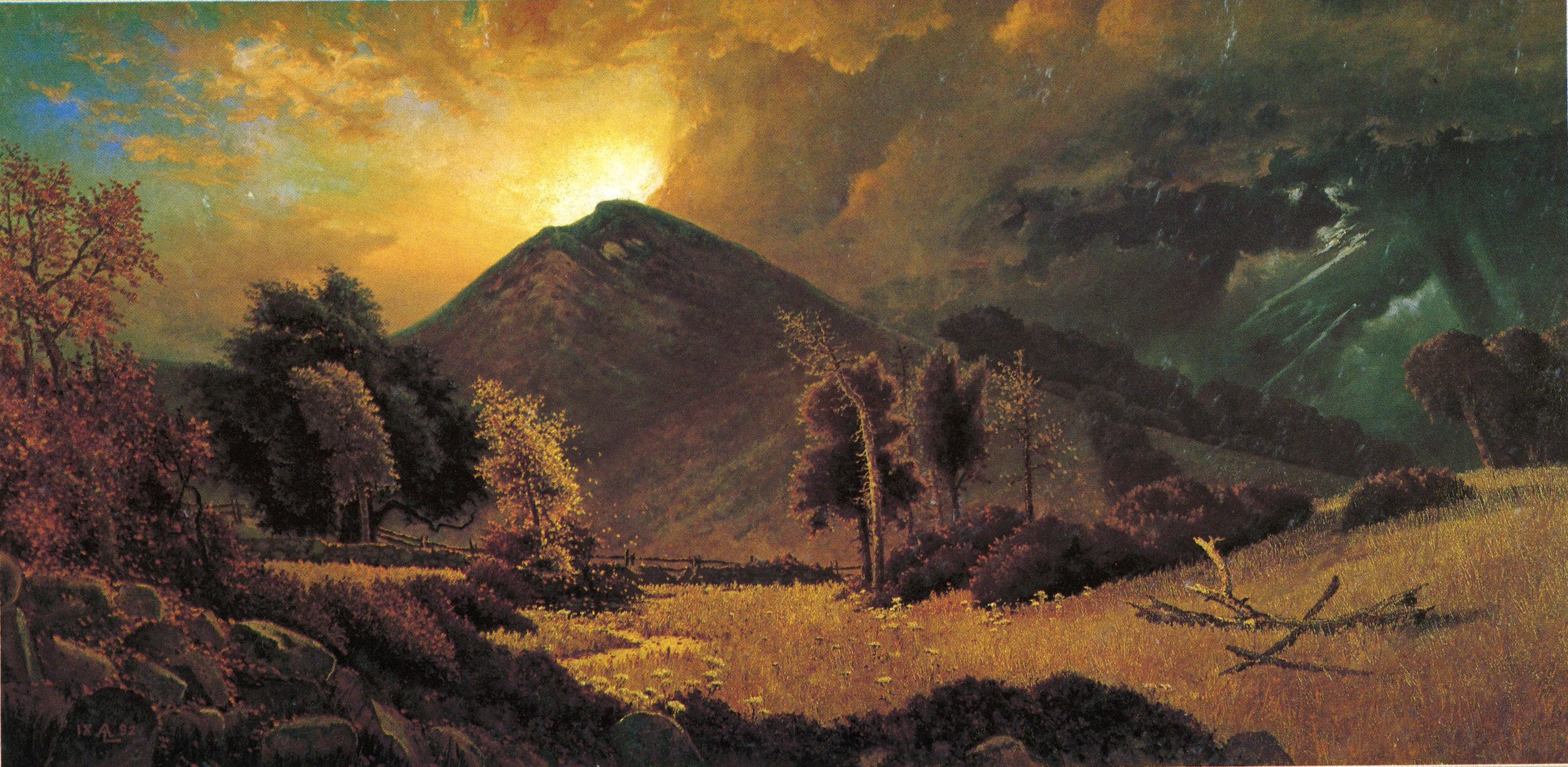
Hill Cumorah by Lambourne

Alfred Lambourne (February 2, 1850 – June 6, 1926) was an English-born American artist and author. In the 1860s, he and his family moved to the American West with the Mormon pioneers. He is best remembered for his paintings, but he also wrote short fiction for Mormon periodicals, and other works of musings and poetry.

== Biography ==
Lambourne was born to William and Martha Wernham in Chieveley, Berkshire, England on the River Lambourn. The family emigrated to the United States when he was a child. They first settled in St. Louis, Missouri before moving to Utah Territory.

His artistic talents were encouraged by his parents from an early age.

During the trip from St. Louis to Salt Lake City, Utah, he kept a sketchbook of scenery along the way. After arriving in Salt Lake City, Utah at the age of 16, Lambourne took work as a scenic artist for the Salt Lake Theatre.

In 1871, he accompanied then-President of the Church of Jesus Christ of Latter-day Saints and former Governor of the Utah Territory, Brigham Young, to Zion Canyon and made the first sketches of the area. In the same decade, Lambourne traveled the American West with photographer Charles Roscoe Savage, painting as Savage photographed, and explored the Wasatch range with H. L. A. Culmer, painting and naming features, and "painted a series of large canvasses representing his journey from the eastern coast of the United States to the Golden Gate" with Reuben Kirkham. He also visited Yosemite, Colorado and Arizona.

Later in life, he focused more on writing, sometimes illustrating his work, eventually writing 14 books. In November, 1895, he began a year living in solitude on Great Salt Lake's remote Gunnison Island, where he wrote Our Inland Sea. In March 1896, a group of guano sifters came to the island, and he included musings about them in the book. In early Winter of 1896, he left the island, along with the guano sifters.

Lambourne died June 6, 1926, in Salt Lake City.

== Legacy ==
In 2014, the annual Alfred Lambourne Arts Program was founded to showcase artwork depicting the Great Salt Lake, in order to celebrate the lake and support its conservation. Prizes awarded in multiple categories.
