= National Independence Day Festival and Parade =

The National Independence Day Festival and Parade (NIDFP) was an annual parade held in Washington, D.C., from 1981 to 1994. Charles W. Ferguson founded the National Independence Day Festival and Parade and served as its executive director. Mr. Ferguson registered the NIDFP as a non-profit organization, and received financial support for the celebration from industrial heads in the Washington D.C. area. After receiving permission from the National Park Service to hold the parade along Constitution Avenue, the first National Independence Day Parade was held July 4, 1981. The parade consisted of various entities: high school marching bands, military bands, theatrical and other musical groups. The last NIDFP parade was held on July 4, 1993 the organization being unable to meet the financial demands required to continue its activities. Fears of terrorism stemming from the Persian Gulf War and Desert Storm also led to bands and other performing groups dropping out of the parade and festival, as well as a decline in tourism and airline travel, and the ultimate termination of the NIDFP and its participation in 4 July festivities.
