= Harrison T. Groutage =

American painter

Harrison Thomas Groutage
- Born: April 21, 1925; Richmond, Utah, U.S.
- Died: February 5, 2013 (aged 87); Logan, Utah, U.S.
- Education: Utah State University; Weber State University; Brigham Young University; University of Utah
- Occupations: Painter, educator
- Spouse: Iva Lou Pilkington

Harrison T. Groutage (April 21, 1925 – February 5, 2013) was an American painter and educator. He taught art at Utah State University for more than three decades, and his artwork can be found in museums in California, Utah and New York.

== Life ==
Groutage was born on April 21, 1925, in Richmond, Utah. He attended Utah State University and Weber State University, and he earned a bachelor's degree from Brigham Young University in 1953, followed by a master in Fine Arts from the University of Utah in 1954.

Groutage taught in the Art Department at Utah State University from 1955 to 1989, and he was the chair of its department from 1965 to 1972. He painted watercolors as well as acrylic and oil paintings. Like many Utahn artists, Groutage spent his winters near St. George, Utah. He received the Governor's Award in the Arts from the State of Utah in 1999.

Groutage was a member of the Church of Jesus Christ of Latter-day Saints, and he married Iva Lou Pilkington in the Logan Utah Temple in 1943. He died on February 5, 2013. His work can be seen at the Norton Simon Museum, the National Academy of Design, and the Springville Museum of Art.
