= George S. Dibble =

American painter, academic, art critic (1904–1992)

George Smith Dibble
- Born: 1904; Oahu, Hawaii
- Died: June 2, 1992 (aged 87–88); Salt Lake City, Utah, U.S.
- Education: University of Utah; Art Students League of New York, B.A. and M. A. from Columbia University
- Occupations: Painter, academic, art critic, Professor of Art at University of Utah for 49 years, Emeritus professor of Art University of Utah

George S. Dibble (1904 – June 2, 1992) was an American painter, academic and art critic. He was a professor of Art at the University of Utah and an art critic for The Salt Lake Tribune.

== Life ==
Dibble was born in 1904 in Oahu, Hawaii. He was trained at the University of Utah and the Art Students League of New York.

Dibble first taught Art at the Murray High School in Murray, Utah, and Washington Elementary School in Salt Lake City. He later became a professor of Art at his alma mater, the University of Utah. He authored a textbook, and he was an art critic for The Salt Lake Tribune for four nearly forty years. Dibble was also a painter in his own right, and he won a prize at the Utah State Fair as early as 1935. He became known as a Cubist watercolorist.

Dibble died of cancer on June 2, 1992, in Salt Lake City, at age 88.

== Selected works ==
- Dibble, George (1966). Watercolor: Materials and Techniques. New York: Holt, Rinehart and Winston. OCLC 1029412.
