= Alvin Gittins =

English painter

Alvin Lorraine Gittins
- Born: 17 January 1922; Kidderminster, England
- Died: 7 March 1981 (aged 59)
- Spouse: Gwendolen Ellis

Alvin Loraine Gittins (17 January 1922 – 7 March 1981) was an English-born artist who was a professor at the University of Utah (U of U). He has been described as "one of [the United States] greatest portrait artists ever".

== Life and career ==
Gittins was born in Kidderminster, Worcestershire, England. He attended art school in London. Gittins was raised in the Church of Jesus Christ of Latter-day Saints (LDS Church) in England. He first came to the United States in 1946 and graduated from Brigham Young University in 1947. He was appointed a member of the U of U art faculty in 1947. From 1956 to 1962 Gittins was head of the U of U's art department.

Gittins painted 89 portraits of people connected with the U of U and at least one of his portraits hangs in almost every campus building. He focused heavily on the detail of human figures and sought to bring out his subjects feelings in his paintings. As a professor, Gittins was noted for insisting on intensive studies of anatomy and perspective at a time when most art programs focused on expressionist art.

Among the many people Gittins painted portraits of were David O. McKay, Henry Eyring, Maurice Abravanel, and Haile Selassie I. However, not all of his subjects were living. He also painted a portrait of Joseph Smith, which is a popular image of the LDS Church's founder. Work done by GIttins was exhibited at the Royal Society of Portrait Painters and the Royal Society of British Painters in London as well as at Portraits, Inc. in New York City.

Gittins married Gwendolen Ellis and they had four children.
