= LeConte Stewart =

American Latter-day Saint painter and printmaker

- Born: April 15, 1891; Glenwood, Utah, U.S.
- Died: June 6, 1990 (aged 99); Kaysville, Utah, U.S.
- Occupation: Landscape artist
- Known for: Painting, printmaking
- Spouse: Zipporah Layton
- Parent(s): Isaac John Stewart and Anna Eva Heppler

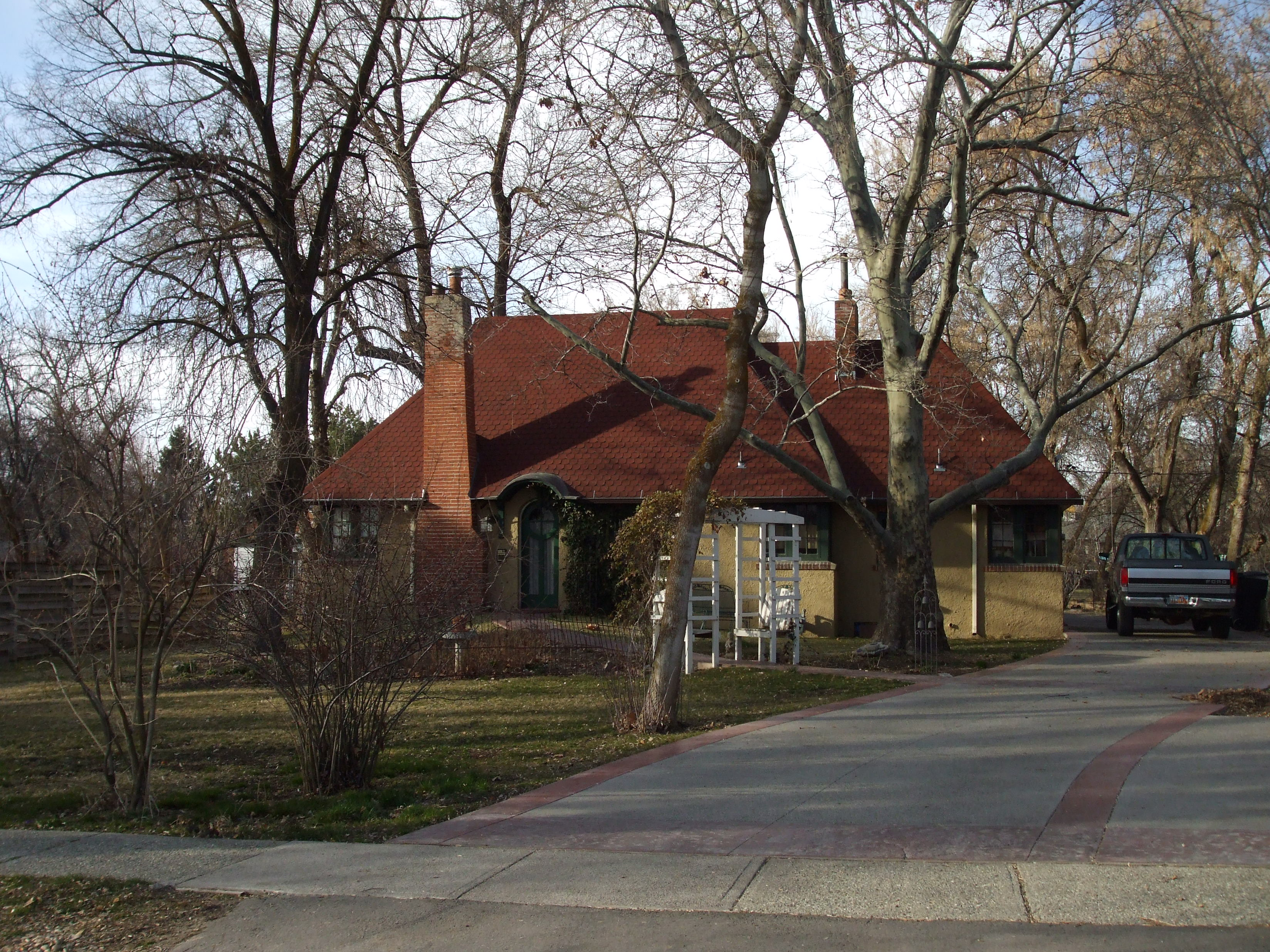
Stewart's historic home in Kaysville, Utah

LeConte Stewart (April 15, 1891 – June 6, 1990) was an American Latter-day Saint painter and printmaker, primarily known for his landscapes of rural Utah. His art media included oils, watercolors, pastel and charcoal, as well as etchings, linocuts, and lithographs. His home and art studio in Kaysville, Utah, is on the National Register of Historic Places.

== Personal life ==
Stewart was born in Glenwood, Utah. His art education began in 1912, at the University of Utah, and included studies at the Art Students League summer school at Woodstock, New York, and the Pennsylvania Academy of the Fine Arts in Chester Springs.

In 1917 Stewart went to Hawai'i as a missionary for the Church of Jesus Christ of Latter-day Saints. After being there about 3 weeks he was given the assignment to create internal murals for the various endowment rooms of the Laie Hawaii Temple. This had already been done by Lewis A. Ramsey a few months before. However Ramsey's murals had been placed directly on the walls and were already deteriorating due to high levels of moisture. Besides creating murals Stewart also oversaw the general decorative work of the temple, overseeing the choice of and placement of furniture, carpets and drapes.

While he was in Hawai'i Stewart's fiancee Zipporah Layton traveled there from Utah. They were married and Mrs. Stewart began to serve as a teacher at the school the church ran in La'ie while Stewart continued to oversee the artistic and decorative work for the temple.

Stewart became the head of the Art Department at the University of Utah in 1938, and held that post until his retirement in 1956. Stewart died in Kaysville, Utah at the age of 99. He was survived by his son, Maynard Dixon Stewart, an artist and much-beloved and respected art instructor (now retired) at San Jose State University.

== Work ==
Stewart is best known for his unidealized landscapes of rural Utah, spawning the term "LeConte Stewart Country." Stewart is quoted as saying, "It is not that I love the lyrical in nature the less, but I feel that in modern life there is no time, no inclination for it. In these pictures I'm trying to cut a slice of contemporary life as it is in the highways and biways [sic] as I have found it." Some of Stewart's paintings have a photographic quality from a distance but are actually formed with broad strokes and a thick palette.

Much of his work uses direct impressionistic techniques to convey the meaning of what he saw around him, illustrating things "...that are introspective, that you peer into, that you understand and feel." Stewart stated: "Impressionism is the most important painting innovation of all time....I thought to myself, why not use this technique to express an idea rather than making it the end goal of a painting? I have tried to think of it as a means of interpreting landscaping rather than making it merely impressionistic."

Stewart described himself as having an urgency in his work. A plaque in the Kaysville Gallery of Art reads: "I had a great urgency to work as rapidly as possible. Each Saturday I painted one large 24-by-30-inch picture in the morning and another in the afternoon. Between I painted four smaller studies. Six was an average Saturday for me."

In addition to landscapes, Stewart also did portraiture and murals. He painted several murals for the Church of Jesus Christ of Latter-day Saints (LDS Church) buildings, including works found inside the LDS temples in Hawaii, Alberta, and Arizona, as well as murals for the Salt Lake City International Airport and the historic Bigelow-Ben Lomond Hotel.

== Legacy ==
In 1985, the LDS Church published a collector's item titled LeConte Stewart: The spirit of landscape by Robert Davis, which documented some of his works. 7 November 2002 was declared as "LeConte Stewart Day" in Utah by then Governor Mike Leavitt.

The largest public exhibition of LeConte Stewart's work to date began in Salt Lake City on 21 July 2011 and continued until 15 January 2012. It was jointly hosted by the Utah Museum of Fine Arts and the LDS Church History Museum, with concurrent shows at those museum's individual locations. It was the first collaboration of this kind for those institutions, each of which holds a significant amount of fine art by Utah artists.

== See also ==
- Mormon art
- National Register of Historic Places listings in Davis County, Utah
- Springville Museum of Art
