= Alice Merrill Horne =

American painter and politician

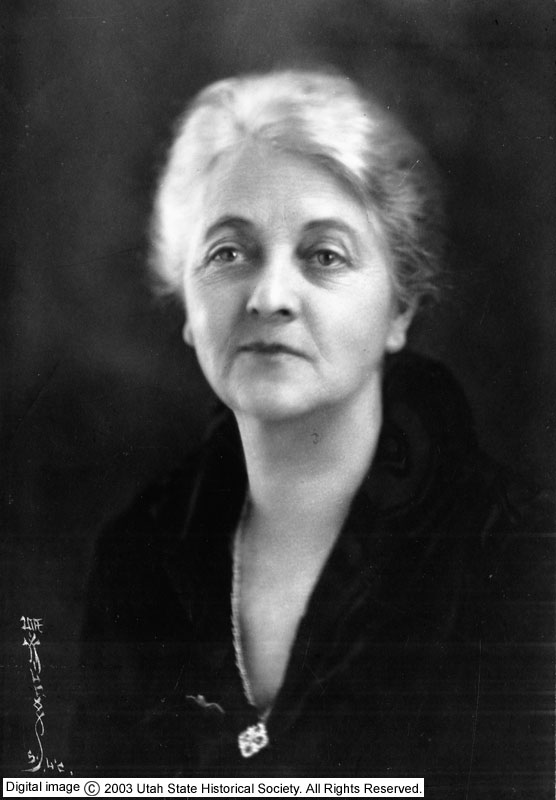
- Portrait of Alice Merrill Horne. Alice Merrill Horne was prominent in the fields of art, drama, painting, poetry, and politics.
- Born: January 2, 1868; Fillmore, Utah Territory
- Died: October 7, 1948 (aged 80); Salt Lake City, Utah, U.S.
- Education: Earned a teaching certificate and pedagogy degree from the University of Deseret in 1887; Studied at the School of the Art Institute of Chicago; Studied art under George M. Ottinger, J. T. Harwood, Mary Teasdel, John Hafen, Herman Haag, and Henry Taggart.
- Occupations: Artist; Teacher at the Washington School in Salt Lake City; Salt Lake Eighth District Representative 1898-1900
- Notable work: Devotees and Their Shrines (Book, 1914); Columbus, Westward Ho (Book, 1921)
- Title: Democratic party of Salt Lake County Chair; President of the Daughters of the Utah Pioneers; Regent of the Daughters of the Revolution; National Peace Society Utah Branch Chair
- Board member of: Relief Society General Board 1902-1916
- Spouse: George Henry Horne
- Children: 6
- Parent(s): Clarence Merrill and Bathsheba (Kate) Smith
- Honours: Salt Lake Council of Women's Hall of Fame Inductee; Medal of Honor for civic service from the Academy of Western Culture

Alice Merrill Horne (1868–1948) was a Utah artist and politician.

== Biography ==
=== Early life and education ===
Alice Merrill Horne (called Allie in her youth) was born in Fillmore, Utah Territory, to Clarence Merrill and Bathsheba (Kate) Smith. Her maternal grandparents were George A. Smith and Bathsheba W. Smith.

Horne earned a teaching certificate and degree in pedagogy at the University of Deseret (now the University of Utah). She also studied at the School of the Art Institute of Chicago and was later instructed privately by artists John Hafen, George M. Ottinger, J. T. Harwood, Herman Haag, Mary Teasdel, and Henry Taggart.

Alice Merrill Horne married George H. Horne in 1890. They met while Alice Horne was organizing a Shakespearean Society. George would spend much of his career as a banker in Salt Lake City. Early in their marriage, George served as a missionary for the Church of Jesus Christ of Latter-day Saints (LDS Church) in the southern United States, and during this time Alice worked as a schoolteacher at the Washington School in Salt Lake City. George and Alice had six children (including Lyman, Virginia, Zorah, Albert). Horne was made chair of the Utah's Liberal Arts Committee for the 1893 Columbian Exposition and World's Fair in Chicago.

=== Political career and leadership positions ===
In 1898, Horne was elected to the Utah House of Representatives (3rd Utah State Legislature) representing the Salt Lake Eighth District. She served for one term (1898-1900) and made many notable contributions in a short time. She advocated for many bills that eventually became law. While many of them revolved around the arts and education, she did not limit her influence to those areas alone. While in the state legislature, she was a key force behind enacting a bill to create a state art institute and to create a state art collection. The latter is today named the Alice Art Collection after her (State of Utah Art Collections). Professor William M. Stewart of the University of Utah brought a scholarship bill to her and asked for her help with it. It was passed, and by 1921 had provided more than 8,000 students with scholarships. Among others, Horne campaigned for a Public Health bill, an Art bill, and a Fish and Game bill. She served on the Rules, Public Health, and Education and Art committees during her term in office and was also chair of the new University Land-Site Committee that oversaw the acquisition for the current site of the University of Utah.

In 1901, Horne was called as a member of the general board of the LDS Church's Relief Society. She served on the board until 1916 and during part of this time was chair of the art committee. In 1904, she served as a delegate on behalf of the Relief Society to the International Congress of Women held in Berlin, where she delivered two addresses. She served as president of the Daughters of the Utah Pioneers from April 11, 1903, to April 24, 1905. She was a leader and advocate in numerous other ways, including as a regent of the Daughters of the Revolution and the Chair of the Utah branch of the National Peace Society. Horne also played a role in organizing the Women's Chamber of Commerce in Salt Lake City as well as the Smokeless Fuel Federation.

Horne authored two books at this time in her life: Devotees and Their Shrines and Columbus, Westward Ho!. The former is a handbook of Utah art and artists that aligns with her continual promotion of the arts throughout her life's work. A portion of her introduction to the book reads, "God has created gifts, and men work so that we are not without poets, painters, sculptors, architects, craftsmen, gardeners and home makers. So long as talent and industry unite there will be art—original, spontaneous, inspirational—the kind that lives. We are all artists to a degree, or at least let us believe that Providence so intended." Moving away from the description of art and towards the production of it, Horne's 1922 Columbus, Westward Ho! is the script of a play that she authored. Intended for young audiences, it is a retelling of the Christopher Columbus story.

Starting in the 1920s, Horne ran an art gallery with the main goal of exhibiting and selling works of inter-mountain artists. Her husband died in 1934 and she continued to run the art gallery until her own death in 1948.

== Awards and recognition ==
- First inductee to the Salt Lake City Council of Women's Hall of Fame
- Was given a Medal of Honor for civic service from the Academy of Western Culture
- 2nd woman in Utah to be elected to a state office

Non-profit organization positions
Preceded by Annie Taylor Hyde	2nd President of the Daughters of the Utah Pioneers; April 11, 1903–April 24, 1905	Succeeded by Maria Young Dougall
