= Albert Rigolot =

French painter

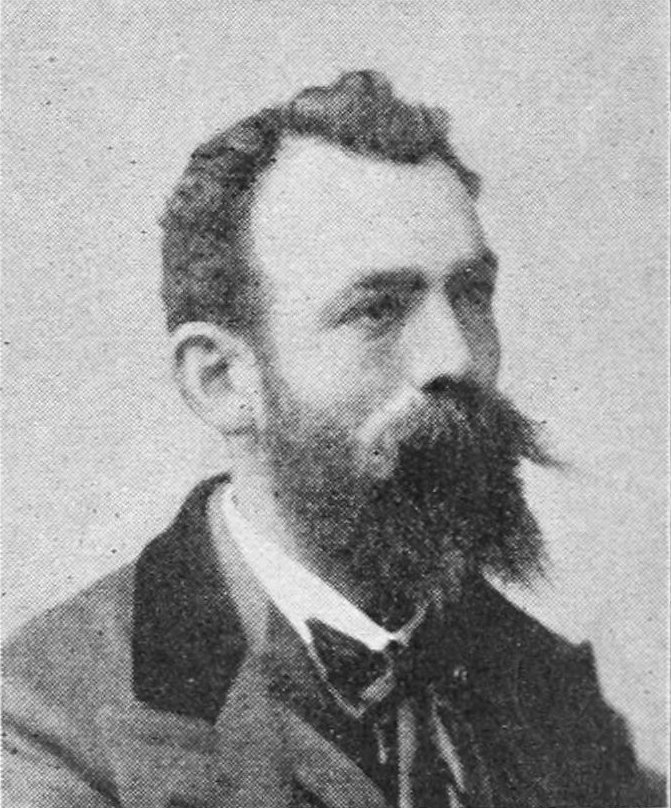
- Albert Rigolot; photograph by Pierre Petit, 1890s
- Born: Albert-Gabriel Rigolot; 28 November 1862; Paris, France
- Died: 25 April 1932 (aged 69); Paris, France
- Education: Léon Germain Pelouse and Auguste Allongé
- Known for: Painter
- Movement: Orientalist; Barbizon school
- Children: Yves Rouvre

Albert Gabriel Rigolot (French: [albɛʁ ʁiɡolo]; 28 November 1862, Paris – 25 April 1932, Paris) was a French landscape painter.

== Biography ==
He took his first art lessons in the public schools of the 16th arrondissement. Later, he studied with Léon Germain Pelouse and Auguste Allongé and had his début at the Salon des Artistes Français in 1886.

He then became a teacher at the Académie Julian, where his pupils included a group known as the "French Art Missionaries" (Lorus Pratt, John B. Fairbanks, Edwin Evans and John Hafen), who had been sent from Utah in 1890 by the LDS Church to improve their skills for painting murals in the Salt Lake Temple.

Rigolot was heavily influenced by the Barbizon school. After a trip to Algeria in 1896, he began to produce works in the Oriental style and became a member of the Société des Peintres Orientalistes Français.

In 1900, he was among those painters commissioned to provide decorations for Le Train Bleu, a famous restaurant inside the Gare de Lyon. That same year, he was awarded a Silver Medal at the Exposition Universelle. The following year, he became a Chevalier in the Legion d'Honneur.

His son Yves also became a painter; working under the name Yves Rouvre.

== See also ==
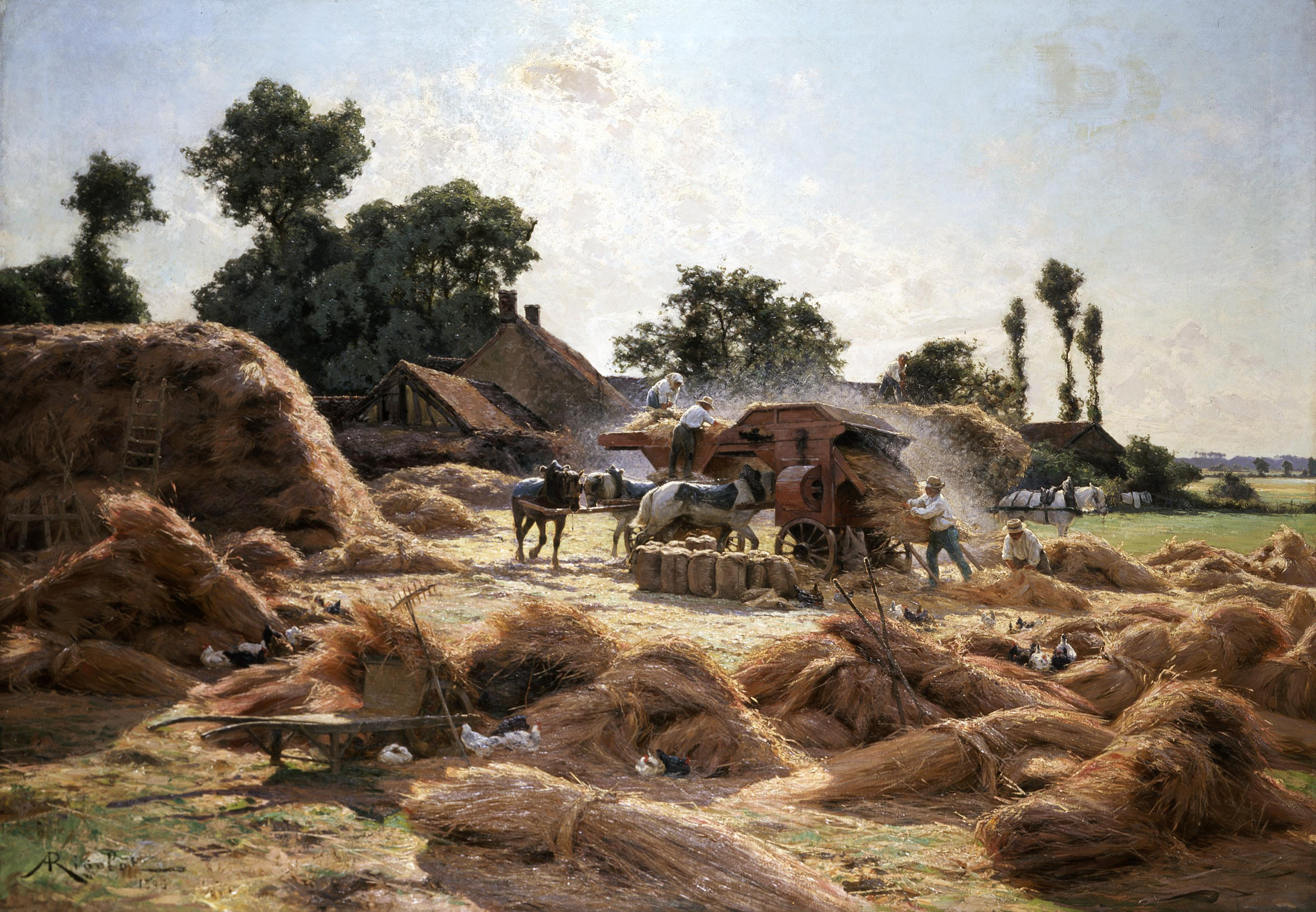
The Threshing Machine (1893)

- List of Orientalist artists
- Orientalism
