= James Harwood =

James Harwood may refer to:

- James Taylor Harwood (1860–1940), American painter, engraver and art teacher
- Jim Harwood (c. 1938–1993), American journalist, film critic, screenwriter, author, and television producer
