= Donald Beauregard =

American painter and charcoal drawer

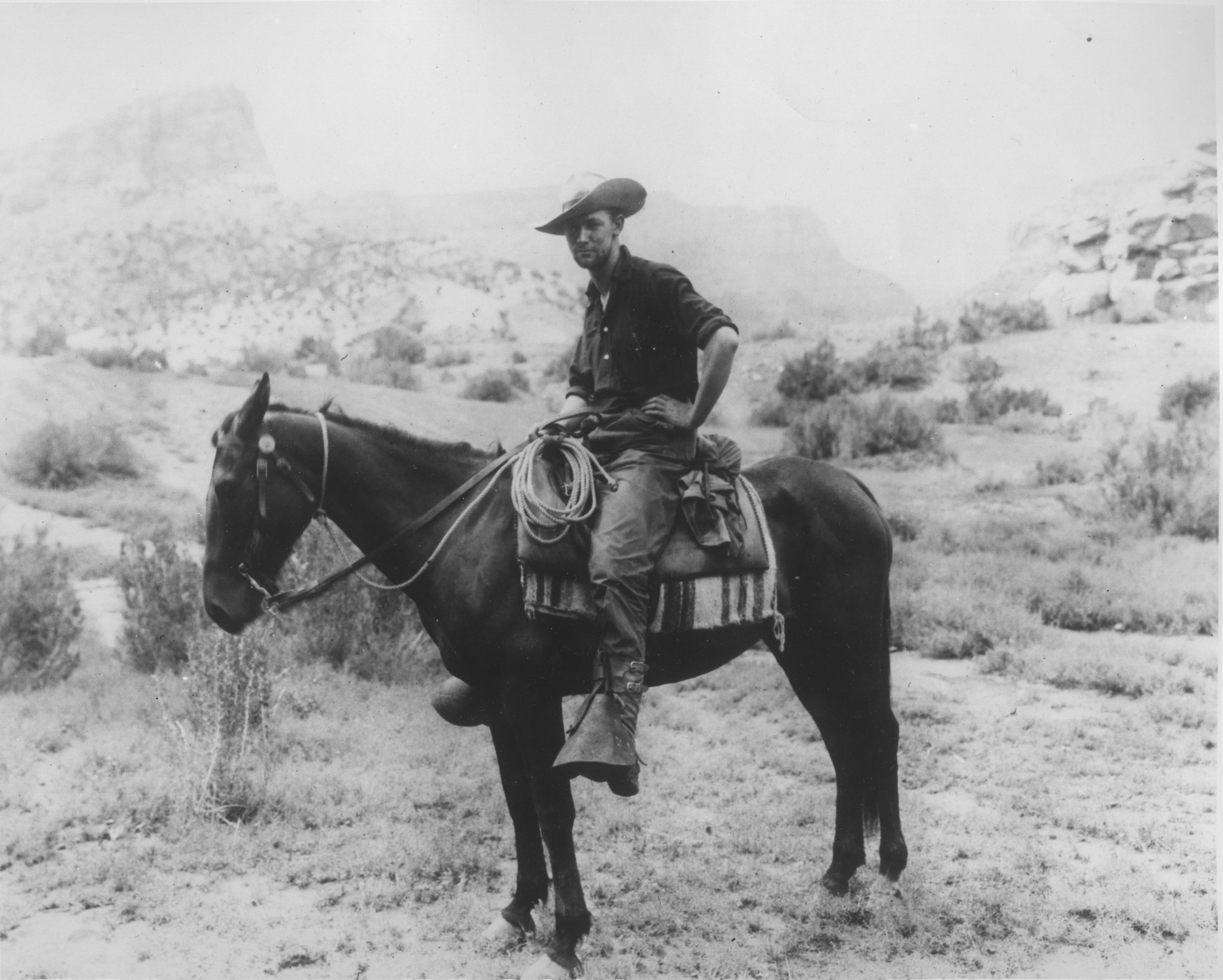
- Born: 1884; Fillmore, Utah Territory
- Died: May 2, 1914 (aged 29–30); Fillmore, Utah, U.S.
- Resting place: Fillmore Cemetery
- Education: Brigham Young University; University of Utah; Académie Julian
- Occupations: Painter, drawer

Donald Beauregard (1884 - May 2, 1914) was an American painter and charcoal drawer. Trained in Utah and France, he painted the landscapes of the American West. He died at age 30.

== Life ==
Beauregard was born in 1884 in Fillmore, Utah Territory. He attended Brigham Young University in 1901–1903, followed by the University of Utah in 1903–1906, where he was trained by Edwin Evans, and the Académie Julian in Paris, France, where he was trained by Jean-Paul Laurens. He was influenced by Paul Cézanne and Paul Gauguin.

Beauregard returned to the United States, where he became a charcoal drawer and painter of the American West, especially Utahn and New Mexican landscapes. He also painted two murals for the Panama–California Exposition. According to the Utah Artists Project, "Beauregard's painting reveals his love of rich brilliant color." Beauregard was also an art teacher at the Ogden High School in Ogden, Utah.

Beauregard was a member of the Church of Jesus Christ of Latter-day Saints. He died on May 2, 1914, in his hometown of Fillmore at age 30, and he was buried in the Fillmore Cemetery.
