= J. Leo Fairbanks =

American painter

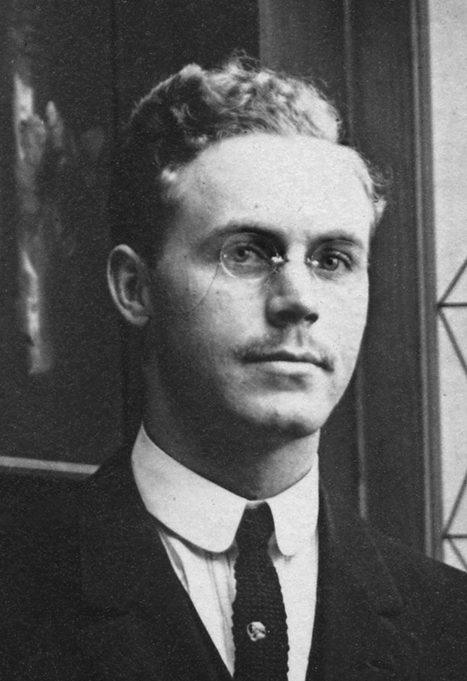
- J. Leo Fairbanks in 1912
- Born: 1878; Payson, Utah, U.S.
- Died: 1946 (aged 67–68); Corvallis, Oregon, U.S.
- Education: Brigham Young University; Académie Julian; Académie Colarossi; Académie de la Grande Chaumière
- Occupations: Art educator, painter, sculptor
- Parent: John B Fairbanks
- Relatives: Avard Tennyson Fairbanks (brother); Jonathan Leo Fairbanks (nephew)

John Leo Fairbanks (1878–1946) was an American art educator, painter and sculptor. Born in Utah, educated at Brigham Young University and trained in Paris, he headed the art department of the Salt Lake City School District until he joined Oregon State University as the chair of its department of art and architecture in 1923. He designed a sculptural frieze in the Laie Hawaii Temple.
