= Lorus Pratt =

American landscape painter (1855–1923)

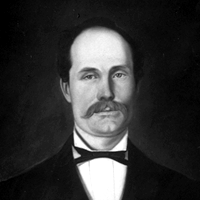
Lorus Pratt (self-portrait?, date unknown)

Lorus Bishop Pratt (November 27, 1855, Tooele, Utah – December 29, 1923, Salt Lake City) was an American landscape painter and missionary. In 1890, he was one of a group of painters who studied in Paris under the sponsorship of the Church of Jesus Christ of Latter-day Saints (LDS Church), in preparation for painting murals at the nearly completed Salt Lake Temple.

== Biography ==
Pratt's father was Orson Pratt, an early LDS Church member who became one of its leading theologians. He studied art at the University of Deseret (now the University of Utah) with Dan Weggeland and George M. Ottinger, who encouraged him to further his studies in New York and Philadelphia.

After missions in Pennsylvania and Missouri, he made his first visit to Europe in 1879, when he was called to serve at the LDS mission in England, which was led by his father, and assisted in organizing the current chapter and verse arrangement in the official LDS Church edition of the Book of Mormon. He returned to Europe in 1885, visiting Paris with his wife and children.

In 1890, together with John Fairbanks, John Hafen and Edwin Evans, Pratt was awarded a two-year scholarship to study at the Académie Julian in Paris, where their primary instructor was Albert Rigolot, and they became known as the "French Art Missionaries". While on this assignment, he held the position of president of the French Mission. Trips to the countryside to paint in plein aire inspired him to focus on paintings featuring harvests and agricultural workers. Upon their return, they executed the murals and frescoes for the Salt Lake Temple, which was completed in 1893. He was also involved in creating the artwork in the St. George Temple, Manti Temple and Logan Temple.

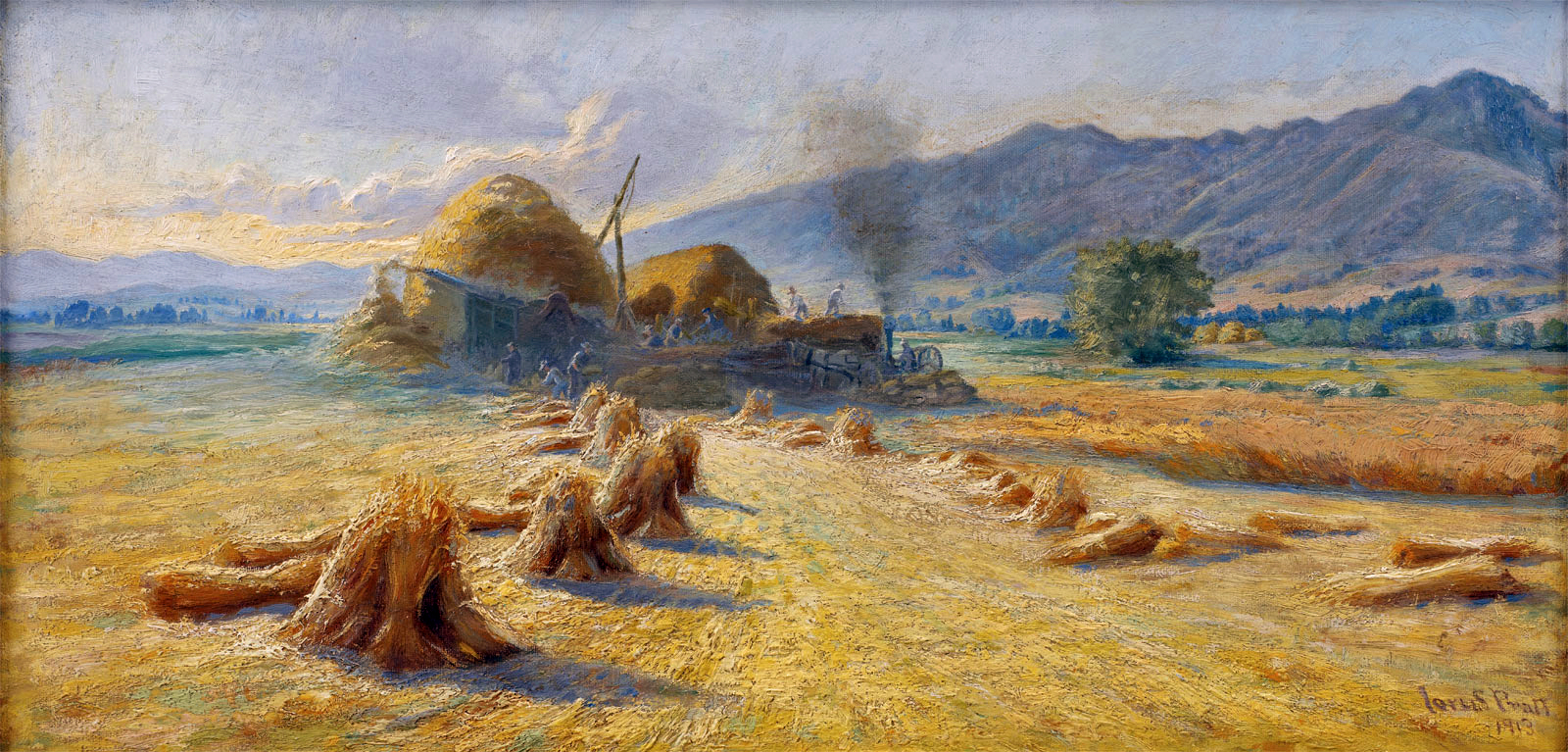
Harvest Time in the Cache Valley (1913)

Pratt's non-Church artwork found little acceptance, and some of his paintings were used to settle debts. He farmed and, for many years, also taught English at the University of Utah.
