= Auguste Allongé =

French painter

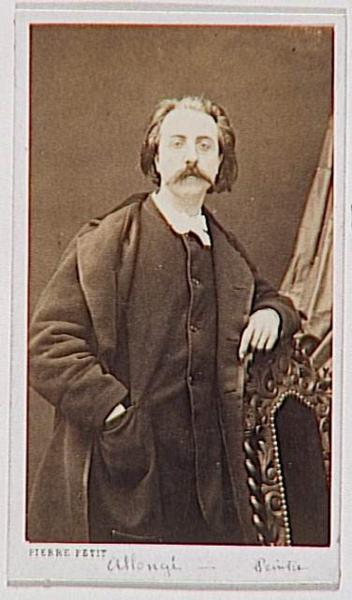
Auguste Allongé; photograph by Pierre Petit

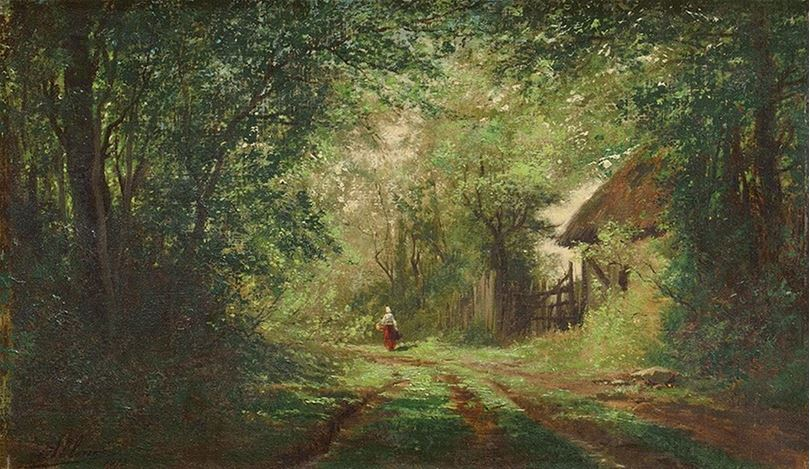
A Walk in the Forest

Auguste Allongé (19 March 1833, Paris - 4 July 1898, Bourron-Marlotte) was a French painter, illustrator and engraver.

== Biography ==
He enrolled at the École nationale supérieure des beaux-arts in 1852, where he studied with Léon Cogniet and Louis Joseph César Ducornet. He was awarded a medal there in 1853. After graduating, he chose to specialize in landscapes and worked as a drawing teacher. He was heavily influenced by the Barbizon School and became associated with the Groupe de Marlotte.

In 1873, he published a treatise on the art of drawing in charcoal (Le Fusain), which has been translated into several languages. It was reprinted in 1891 and 1907. His approach was novel, in that charcoal was normally used only for preliminary sketching, but he suggested techniques by which it could be polished into finished works with a special quality of their own.

He provided illustrations for Les promenades de Paris, by Jules Claretie, and La Forêt de Fontainebleau, by Charles Blanc. His students included Jean-Louis Forain and Albert Rigolot.

A street in Bourron-Marlotte has been named after him. His works may be seen at the Museum of modern art André Malraux (MuMa), the Musée Antoine-Lécuyer and the Musée des beaux-arts de Troyes, among others.
