= John Hafen =

Swiss-born American artist (1856–1910)

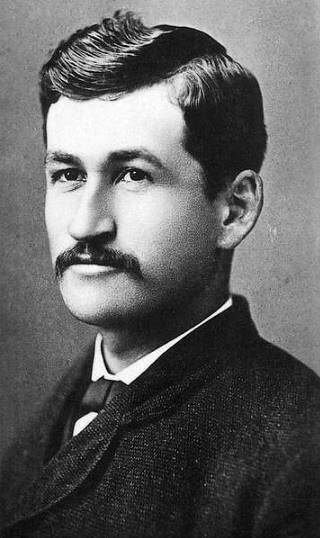
- Born: 22 March 1856; Scherzingen, Switzerland
- Died: 3 June 1910 (aged 54); Indianapolis, Indiana, U.S.
- Occupation: Artist
- Years active: 1881-1910
- Organization(s): Society of Utah Artists; Utah Art Association
- Notable work: Girl Among the Hollyhocks
- Style: Impressionism
- Spouse: Thora Twede (m. 1879)
- Children: 10; J. Leo Hafen
- Parent(s): Johann Hafen; Anna Elizabeth Ruesi
- Awards: Utah Art Institute Exhibition Prize, 1893 and 1903; Utah Art Institute Medal of Honor

John Hafen (March 22, 1856 – June 3, 1910) was a Swiss-born American artist, primarily of landscapes and portraits.

As a child, Hafen immigrated to the United States from Switzerland and settled in Utah. There, he demonstrated artistic abilities from an early age. In 1890, he was one of a group of "art missionaries" who studied at the Académie Julian in Paris under the sponsorship of the Church of Jesus Christ of Latter-day Saints (LDS Church), in preparation for painting murals at the nearly completed Salt Lake Temple. After returning home, Hafen painted landscapes of rural Utah and portraits of LDS General Authorities. He suffered intense financial difficulty throughout his life and did not receive much recognition as an artist until a few years before his death. He has been named "Utah's greatest artist" by Alice Merrill Horne and "is now considered the most appealing of the early Utah stylists."

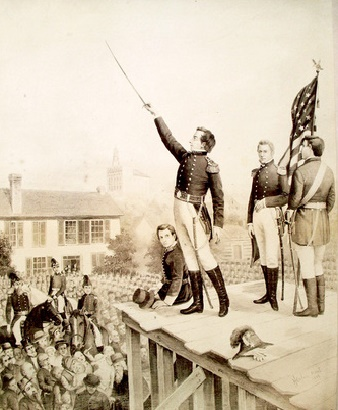
Last Public Address of Lieut. Gen. Joseph Smith (1888)

== Early life ==
Hafen was born on March 22, 1856, in Scherzingen, Switzerland. His parents, Johann Hafen and Anna Elizabeth Ruesi, were converts to the Church of Jesus Christ of Latter-day Saints. Hafen began making art as a young boy, producing sketches as early as age four. When Hafen was six years old, his family immigrated to the U.S. They then traveled westward in wagons. The journey from Switzerland to Utah lasted a total of six months. The Hafens reached the Salt Lake Valley in 1862. Young John grew up in towns such as Payson and Richfield; the former was where Hafen first met future artist J. B. Fairbanks, and the two became childhood friends.

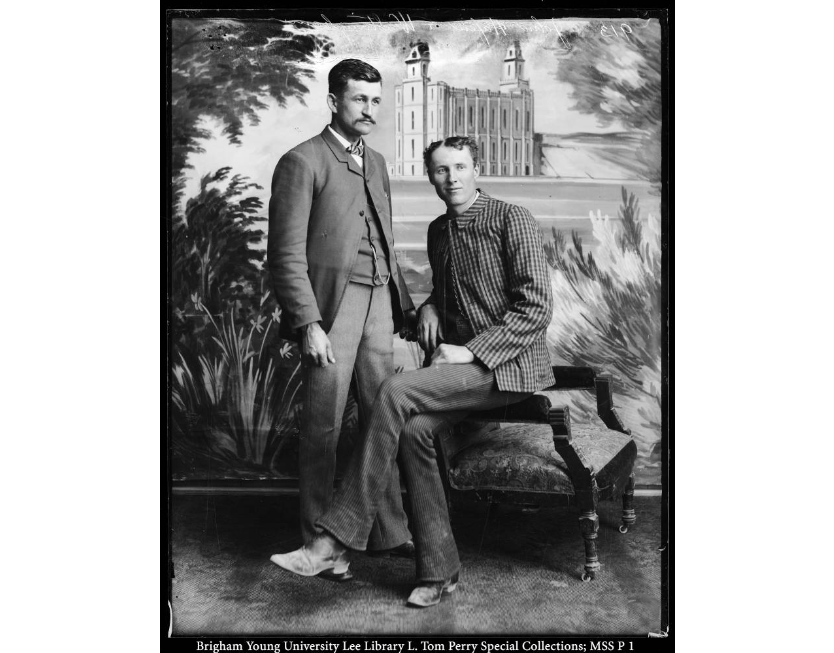
John Hafen (left) and Walter Stringham c. 1888. Taken by George Edward Anderson

During these years, Hafen would "draw with bits of charcoal from the fire on anything he could find." By age eight, he knew he wanted to become an artist; and "when he was eleven years old, his mother showed a bundle of his drawings to a friend who was impressed and gave John a dollar and a half to buy some colors and drawing paper. These were the first real art materials the young artist owned." He was also religious from a young age; after hearing a speech from Brigham Young, nine-year-old Hafen began to follow the Word of Wisdom. After moving around to various places in Utah, the Hafen family settled in Salt Lake City in 1868. There, he began to paint.

== Career ==
Hafen enrolled in Karl G. Maeser's 20th Ward Academy in Salt Lake City, where he took classes in drawing. Over the next ten years, he was tutored by George M. Ottinger and Dan Weggeland, instructors at the University of Deseret (now the University of Utah). The artists wanted Hafen to travel abroad and refine his skills, but the cost of such a trip prevented him from doing so. Still, Hafen worked to develop a career for himself as a painter, and worked as a photographer in the meantime. He started at G. R. Savage's studio in the 1870s, then worked as an assistant to George Edward Anderson. He was able to display some of his paintings of landscapes at Savage's studio, which were described as "not only credible, but decidedly praiseworthy" by a writer for the Salt Lake Herald-Republican. His photographs were also commended.

In 1881, Hafen joined other local artists in founding the Utah Art Association, which organized exhibitions and provided instruction for aspiring artists. The association served as Hafen's outlet for drawing and painting for the rest of the decade. In 1888, at the request of veterans of the Utah militia, he completed his work, Last Public Address of Lieut. Gen. Joseph Smith, a painting of an event that occurred 44 years earlier in Nauvoo, Illinois. It was shown on a poster advertising a reunion of the veterans. Though not entirely historically accurate, Last Public Address is still used today as a popular depiction of the event. During this time, Hafen also drew crayon portraits of a variety of people, including military leaders. Some were displayed at Savage's studio. His work in the photography industry continued as well; he opened a gallery in American Fork with his wife, Thora Twede. Despite the variety of his efforts, Hafen barely supported himself and his family with his artistic ability alone.

=== The French Art Mission ===
With the help of George Q. Cannon, Hafen successfully convinced the LDS Church leadership to sponsor his art studies abroad. He felt his plan was divinely inspired, and wanted to use what he believed to be his God-given talent to glorify God in return. There were no artists in the church at that time "qualified to decorate the temple", so the First Presidency authorized the subsidization of the art mission; they agreed to provide a total of $2,160 to fund the trip, and in return, the artists would use what they learned abroad to paint the murals in the Salt Lake Temple when they returned to Utah. On June 4, 1890, alongside John Fairbanks, Lorus Pratt, and Edwin Evans, Hafen was called as a full-time missionary and assigned to Paris, France. Once arrangements were made, the "French Art Missionaries" traveled east by train, stopping in New York City to visit the Metropolitan Museum of Art, then boarded the steamship Nevada to cross the Atlantic. During the voyage, they taught some passengers about their faith and made a goal to produce one sketch each day. Hafen recorded that those who lagged on this goal would "be fined 10 cents. The only fine imposed on our trip so far was Loris; one day he was so busy teaching the gospel to fellow passengers that he forgot to make a sketch."

After arriving in Paris on July 24, 1890, Hafen and Fairbanks began study at the Académie Julian, where their primary instructor was Albert Rigolot. Hafen's teachers also included Jules Lefebvre and Jean-Paul Laurens. The school taught them the basics of art through lengthy classes spent sketching plaster models and other objects. As a result of such rigorous schooling, the French Art Missionaries "became conversant with the techniques and values of impressionistic easel painting." Hafen would also leave the city to find landscapes to sketch and paint. In the fall and winter, the artists would study indoors at the Académie, then spend the warmer months outdoors in the country under the direction of professionals. Hafen struggled to meet the expectations of his mentors, particularly in drawing, and made an effort to replace what he had taught himself in Utah with these new European artistic methods.

His personal goal was to show truth through his art. He struggled to have confidence in his abilities and grew worried over the artists' financial situation, but was encouraged by a letter from George Cannon to complete his mission. At the conclusion of his year abroad, Hafen traveled to the countryside before leaving Europe to sketch and paint nature scenes. Such experiences with plein air painting inspired him to devote himself to landscapes. He fined-tuned his abilities by learning from landscape artist Arthur F. Mitchell and "returned home ... a confirmed landscapist in the tonalist tradition of the French Barbizon School." George Q. Cannon offered the art missionaries the opportunity to stay longer than the originally agreed-upon duration of a year to continue at the Académie; Hafen, however, decided to stick to the plan and come home. Hafen returned to Utah on August 17, 1891, before the rest of his comrades.

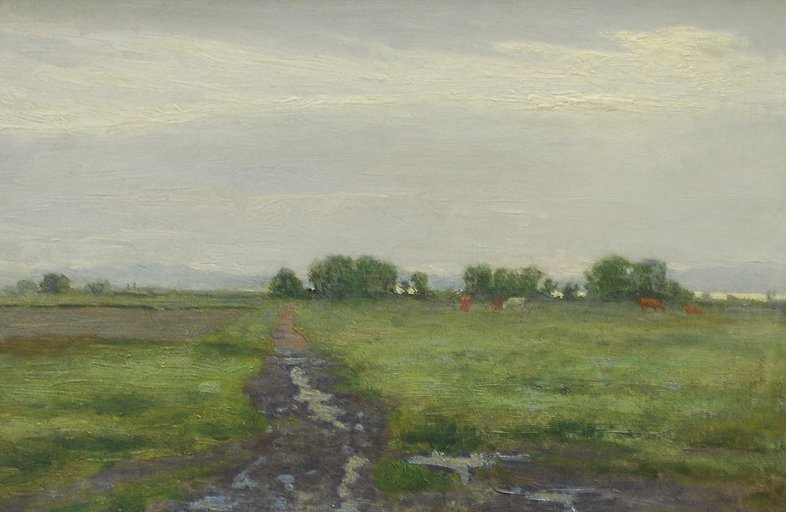
Springville Morning

=== Return to Utah ===
Hafen was the first of his group to begin work at the temple, playing a major role in the initial mural planning. He painted studies on canvas in preparation for painting the murals. Hafen began work on the walls of the garden room in 1892, and soon wrote to the other art missionaries, petitioning their return and assistance in painting the murals. He subsequently had the help of Fairbanks, Pratt, Evans, and Hafen's old mentor, Weggeland. Working together, the team finished the garden and world room murals in time for the temple's opening.

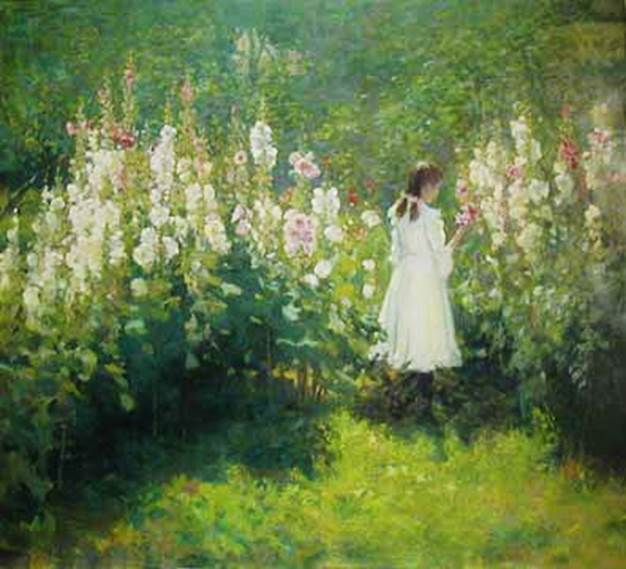
Girl Among the Hollyhocks (1902)

Hafen continued to paint following his return home, and opened up a studio of his own in Springville, where he exhibited his depictions of the rural Utah landscape from the mid-1890s until 1907. He won the 1893 Utah Art Institute Exhibition prize of $300. He also became the vice president of the Society of Utah Artists that year. His works were displayed at the organization's 1896 exhibit, and he was called "one of the best portrait artists in the west." In 1899, he was awarded third prize in the Utah Art Institute competition for his work entitled North Fork Provo Canyon.

After his experience in Paris, Hafen missed being so far from the center of the art world. Both this longing to be working among other artists and continuing financial distress inspired Hafen to leave Utah. In 1900 he decided to travel to the coast, first to Seattle and then to Pacific Grove, California. At his first stop, he encountered artists less skilled but more commercially successful than himself. At the second, he completed fifteen paintings and six drawings in 26 days, some of which were landscapes of the ocean; the artist reportedly became "enamored with painting the sea". Then, without receiving the cash or connections he'd come for, Hafen returned to Utah.

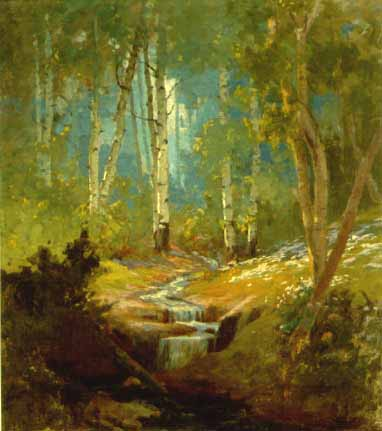
Mountain Stream (1903)

Weighed down by debt, Hafen asked for financial assistance from the LDS Church. He signed a contract with President Lorenzo Snow in 1901 to paint a certain number of landscapes and portraits each month in return for $100. Some of these portraits depicted LDS General Authorities and were "accepted as being satisfactory" by the church. With this support and income, Hafen was able to travel again. His lifelong friend John Fairbanks accompanied him to New York and Boston. Misfortune followed him east, and he again returned home without the recognition he sought. Over the years, Hafen painted an estimated 200 works for the church, including Girl Among the Hollyhocks, which has been commended as "a masterpiece of American Impressionism".

Upon his return to Utah, Hafen saw small bits of success, such as having Heber J. Grant purchase one of his paintings for $250. In 1903, after attending an art lecture at Brigham Young Academy, Hafen decided to donate his painting entitled Mountain Stream to Springville High School in an effort to inspire a new generation of artists in that community. He again won the Utah Art Institute prize that year as well.

=== Later years ===
Still struggling financially, Hafen moved to Illinois in 1908. Soon, his paintings were featured in an exhibit at Marshall Field's Gallery in Chicago. Here, he began to receive some of the recognition he'd been searching for all his life. He then moved to Nashville, Indiana, and began work on a series of eight paintings to accompany Eliza R. Snow's poem "O, My Father", notable in part for the sixth painting, which is the earliest known visual work by a Latter-day Saint artist to depict Heavenly Mother. He used family members and local LDS Church leaders as models. Hafen was offended by the LDS Church's reluctance to endorse the booklet of poems and use them as material for missionary distribution, thinking that they disliked his paintings. Church authorities responded that, while they enjoyed the paintings, they were concerned about salespeople using an endorsement from the church to pressure members into purchasing the booklet. It was subsequently published and sold by Hafen's friends and family. He finished the paintings the year before he died.

Alongside Adolph Shultz, Hafen became involved in the growth of the Brown County Art Colony. He left to visit his family in Utah for a time, then returned to Indiana with his son Virgil, an aspiring artist; together they opened up a studio in Indianapolis. Hafen began to sell more of his paintings and receive more commissions, including the task to paint Governor Thomas R. Marshall's portrait. He was awarded the Utah Art Institute Medal of Honor and first prize at the 1908 Illinois State Fair in the landscape category. His success was short-lived, however, as he died in 1910.

== Personal life ==
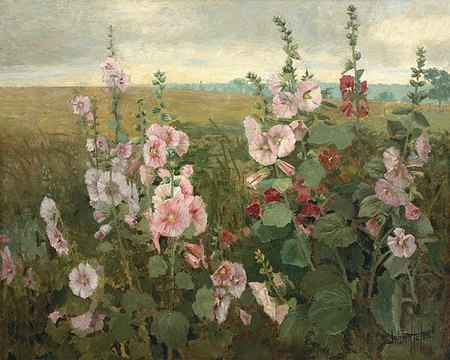
Hollyhocks (1900)

Hafen met his wife, Thora Twede, at George Edward Anderson's photography studio. The couple married on June 13, 1879, in the Salt Lake City Endowment House. Their son, J. Leo Hafen, was born on May 23 of the following year. Hafen struggled to balance his artistic endeavors with the responsibility to provide for his family financially; he entered into multiple ventures to try to make money, but none of them were fruitful. In 1888, Hafen was arrested for entering into plural marriage with his sister-in-law; the case was then dismissed when it was revealed she was engaged to a different man. By 1890, Hafen and Twede had a total of five children. According to one of their sons, theirs was a happy marriage; Twede supported him in his artistic endeavors, and both were devoted to their religion. William Conant Jr. has affirmed: "His driving force was faith in God and the surety that his calling in life was to paint." During his trip to Europe, Hafen spent a few weeks in his home country of Switzerland, continuing to improve his artistic abilities and attempting, unsuccessfully, to trace his family roots. He was deeply inspired by his time in Paris, and admired the city's devotion to art, but missed his wife and children throughout his time as an art missionary.

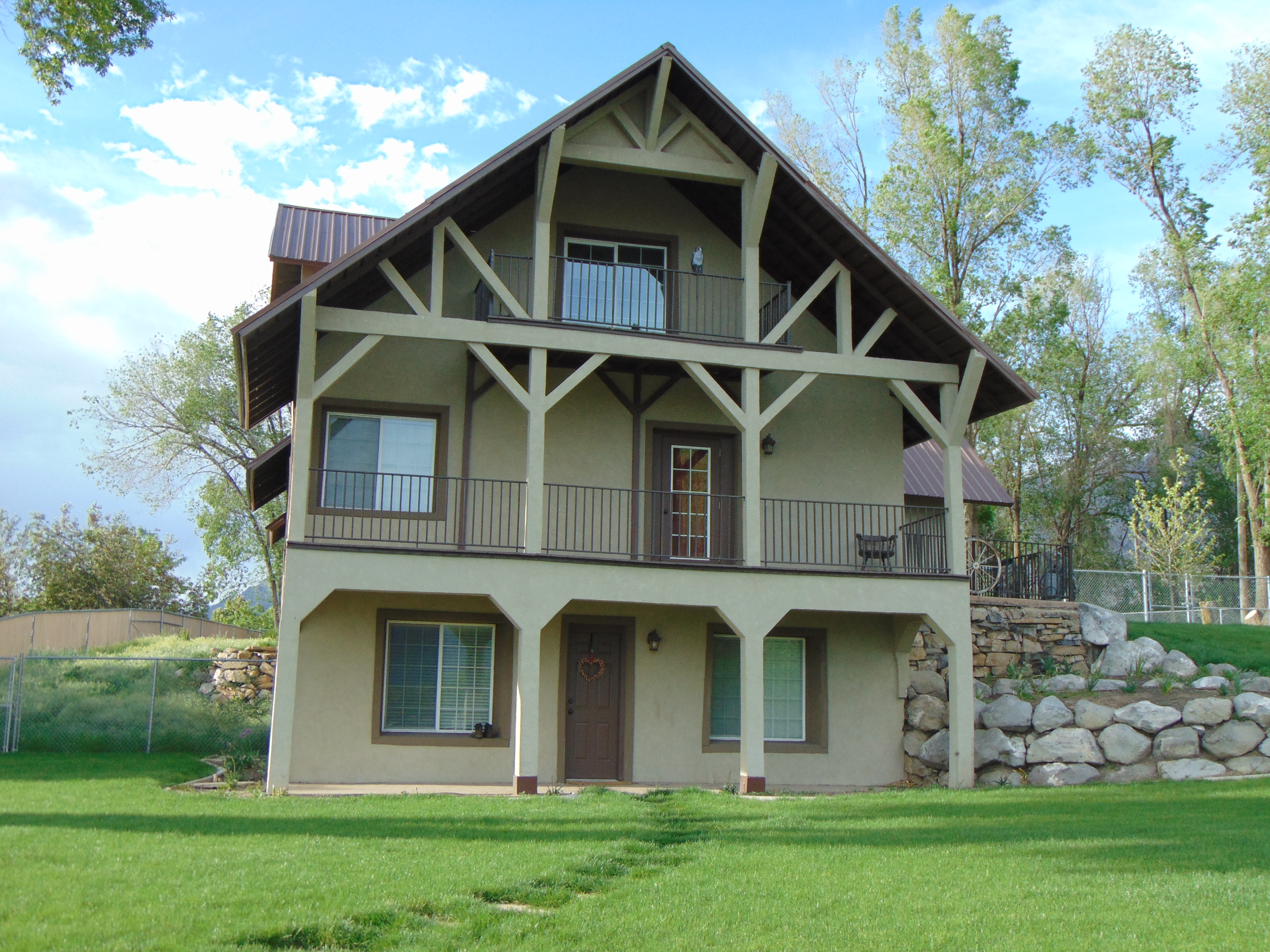
The John Hafen House, Springville, UT (May 2016)

Following Hafen's return to the U.S., Thora gave birth to three more children: Alma was born in 1892, Joseph in 1895, and Frederic in 1898. Their family eventually grew to include 10 children. The financial strain he experienced prior to his time in France continued when he returned to Utah, and Hafen combined his artistic endeavors and commissions from the LDS Church with other employment, as he had done before. As one writer describes, "extreme poverty was Hafen's almost constant companion in life, and he combatted the condition as best he could with the weapons of a romantic." Although too poor to pay his rent, by trading a painting for the right to use some land and bartering with locals for help with the construction, Hafen was able to acquire a home in Springville; a Swiss-style chalet, designed by his friend Alberto Treganza. It was built in 1900 and is now in the National Register of Historic Places as the "John Hafen House". Hafen painted a mural of hollyhocks to cover a bare wall in the house.

Hafen was separated from his family during his trips to the west coast and to the east. He sent money to his wife and children whenever he could. His finances improved during his last few years of life in Indiana, and he was able to make ends meet. Twede and the children moved to Indianapolis to be with him, but he died just five weeks after their arrival.

== Death and legacy ==
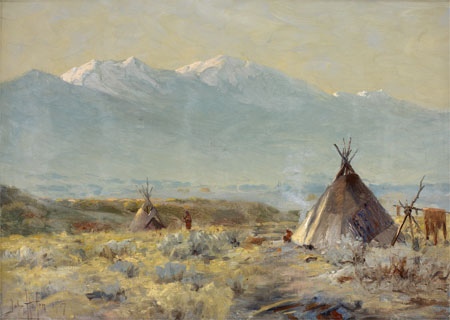
Life on the Trail

On June 3, 1910, Hafen died of pneumonia in Indianapolis. He was 56 years old. His body was brought back to Utah and buried in a Springville cemetery "where he had, years before, painted a picture looking across his beloved valley [into] the tops of the mountains." His funeral was held on June 9 in the Provo Tabernacle. Speakers included George H. Brimhall and B. H. Roberts; the latter recalled that Hafen saw art as his life's mission and "was willing to sacrifice all" for his creative pursuits.

Hafen's artistic philosophy revolved around using art to portray truth, particularly relating to religion; and this uncompromising goal made it challenging for Hafen to appeal to the mass market. Despite his inability to achieve mainstream success, art critic Alice Merrill Horne called Hafen the premier painter of his day. His works became some of the most sought-after among Utah collectors. Many of his works are now part of the collection at the Museum of Church History and Art. Hafen's donation of Mountain Stream to Springville High School sparked an art education initiative that eventually blossomed into the Springville Museum of Art. His paintings have been on display in Paris, Boston, Chicago, Philadelphia, and St. Louis at exhibitions such as that of the Society of American Artists; the John Herron Art Institute has also featured his works.
