= J. Leo Hafen =

American photographer and artist

John Leo Hafen (May 23, 1880 – June 21, 1942) was an American photographer and artist and the first person to bring color photography to Utah. Attending school in Springville, Utah, and Salt Lake City, Hafen experimented with different art forms. He received the Utah Arts Council Award for Best Amateur Work in Photography in 1899. He also won an award at the Art Institute in 1907 and won a Special Merit award from Desert Magazine in 1940. He co-owned the Olsen and Hafen photographic gallery in Provo, Utah, and toured with photographer George Edward Anderson. In 1908, Hafen married Daisy Marie Nelson, who died in childbirth in 1908. One year later, Hafen married Ella Lowry and had five children with her. A member of the Church of Jesus Christ of Latter-day Saints, Hafen was excommunicated for his involvement with the West Tintic Branch, whose members were found guilty of practicing "wife sacrifice", a form of wife swapping which they considered to be religiously justified.

== Education and career ==
J. Leo Hafen was born on May 23, 1880, in Salt Lake City, Utah, to artist John Hafen and Thora Twede. John Hafen was one of four missionaries sent to study art in Paris by the Church of Jesus Christ of Latter-day Saints (LDS Church) to prepare to paint murals for LDS temples. Hafen went to school in Springville and Salt Lake public schools. Hafen took interest in art and experimented with drawing and painting. In 1899, he was awarded the Utah Arts Council award for Best Amateur Work in Photography for his photograph titled "Peapod". He served a mission for the LDS Church in Switzerland and Austria. He attended Brigham Young University and co-created the Olsen and Hafen photographic gallery in Provo with Ed Olsen. He continued to practice photography and worked with George Edward Anderson. When Anderson quit his photography business, Hafen continued it. In 1907, he won an award for his photographs at the Art Institute exhibit and was the first person to introduce color photography to Utah. In 1916, Hafen took photos on an expedition with Levi Edgar Young, his previous mission president, to survey San Juan County.

Hafen moved his family to California where he worked as a gardener on a large estate and continued to practice photography. Deseret Magazine awarded him a Special Merit award in 1940 for his work "Cholla Cactus". Hafen died on June 21, 1942, in California.

== Personal life ==
In June 1907, Hafen married Daisy Marie Nelson, who died in 1908 in childbirth along with the baby. He married Ella Lowry, George Anderson's niece, in June 1909, and they had five children. Hafen was a member of the LDS Church and joined the West Tintic Cooperative in 1919, which began as an economic experiment of communal living and evolved into a religious group. They differed from the LDS Church in that they emphasized dream interpretation and sacrifice. They practiced "wife sacrifice" or the sharing of wives among the men of the group. The LDS Church did not have evidence that Hafen participated in wife sacrifice; however, they excommunicated Hafen for condoning the practice as branch president and for expressing loyalty to Moses Gudmundson, the group's leader. After Hafen died, his wife moved in with the Gudmundson family.
