= Jonathan Leo Fairbanks =

American artist and curator (1933–2026)

- Born: February 19, 1933; Ann Arbor, Michigan, U.S.
- Died: August 1, 2026 (aged 93)
- Education: University of Utah; University of Pennsylvania; University of Delaware
- Occupations: Artist; Curator; Director

Jonathan Leo Fairbanks (February 19, 1933 – August 1, 2026) was an American artist and expert of American arts and antiques. Fairbanks created the American Decorative Arts and Sculpture department at the Museum of Fine Arts, Boston, and served as Curator of the department from 1970 to 1999.

== Life and career ==
Fairbanks was the son of the American sculptor, Avard Fairbanks and grandson of the American painter, John B Fairbanks. He was born in Ann Arbor while his father was teaching at the University of Michigan.

He was on the board of directors of the Fairbanks Family in America, Inc., which owns and operates the immigrant ancestor Jonathan Fairbanks house. He earned a Bachelor of Fine Arts from the University of Utah and a Master of Fine Arts from the University of Pennsylvania through a joint program with the Pennsylvania Academy of Fine Arts. He earned a second master's degree, a Master of Arts in American Culture, from the University of Delaware in the Winterthur Museum Fellowship Program. He served at the museum as an Associate Curator in charge of conservation for nine years.

Fairbanks served as curator for several exhibits, including "Becoming a Nation, Americana from the Diplomatic Reception Rooms, U.S. Department of State," which toured eight cities from April 2003 until January 2005. He was also the senior vice president of AntiquesAmerica.com, the editor at large for the Catalogue of Antiques and Fine Art, and a research associate at Boston University. He was on the board of directors of the Decorative Arts Trust, of which he was president for 12 years. Fairbanks served as vice president of research for Artfact.com. In 2012, he was appointed the director of the Fuller Craft Museum in Brockton, MA. In 2017, he retired to become the museum's senior research associate and director emeritus.

Some of his artwork is owned by institutions such as the National Portrait Gallery, the Museum of Fine Arts in Boston, The Boston Public Library, the Wye House and Myrtle Grove on the Eastern Shore of Maryland, and the Alhambra in southern Spain. His work was featured in the exhibit, “Jonathan Leo Fairbanks, A Painter's Journey, 1952–2004,” which was on display at the Washington County Museum of Fine Arts in Hagerstown, MD in 2004.

He received several awards, including the Victorian Society of America Award for Conservation, the Charles F. Montgomery Award from the Decorative Arts Society, the Urban Glass Award for Exceptional Museum Glass Exhibition, the Ellen Banning Ayer Award for Contributions to Arts and Culture, and the Lifetime Achievement Medal from the Society of Arts and Crafts, Boston. In 2003 the Decorative Arts Trust announced the endowment of the Jonathan L. Fairbanks Lectureship in honor of Fairbanks’ achievements. In 2003, the Furniture Society bestowed upon Fairbanks the Award of Distinction. In 2006 Fairbanks received the Iris Foundation Award for Outstanding Contributions to the Decorative Arts by the Bard Graduate Center. In 2009, Fairbanks was honored by Fuller Craft Museum as a Luminary. In 2016, he received the President's award from Old Sturbridge Village. Jonathan was further honored in 2017 with the tenth anniversary AD 20/21 Lifetime Achievement Award.

His daughter is Theresa Fairbanks Harris, senior conservator for works on paper at the Yale Center for British Art and Yale University Art Gallery.

Fairbanks died on August 1, 2026, at the age of 93.
