= Louis Joseph César Ducornet =

French painter (1806–1856)

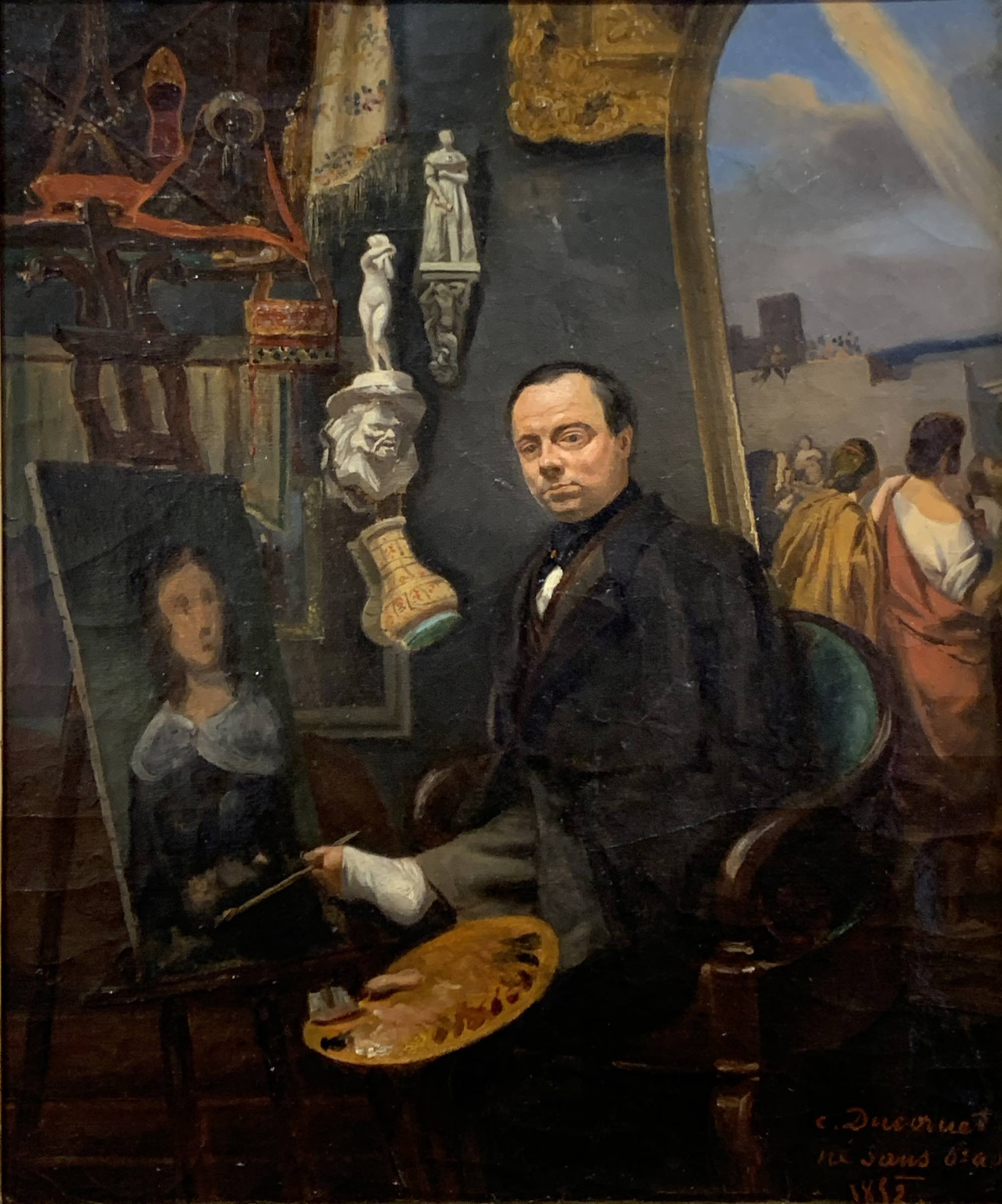
Self-portrait (1852)

Louis Joseph César Ducornet (10 January 1806, Lille – 27 April 1856, Paris) was a French painter who painted with his foot. He is known primarily for biblical and historical scenes, as well as portraits.

== Biography ==
Ducornet was born to poor parents in Lille on January 10, 1806. His father, Alexandre, was a shoemaker. He had a birth defect, now known as phocomelia. Having neither arms nor thighs, and only four toes to his right foot, he was unable to walk and had to be carried by his father. However, while still a child, he would pick up pieces of coal from the floor with his toes and draw rough sketches on the wall. The natural talent he exhibited led to his receiving some art instruction.

With the help of the municipality of Lille, he was sent to Paris in 1824, where he studied under Guillaume Guillon-Lethière, François Louis Joseph Watteau and François Gérard. During the reign of King Louis XVIII he was awarded an annual pension, in the amount of 1,200 Francs, which was continued by King Charles X.

Although his disability prevented him from entering the competition for the Prix de Rome, he was awarded several medals at the Paris Salon. He also participated in the Brussels Salon of 1836 and even took an occasional student; notably Auguste Allongé. He painted an eleven feet high depiction of Mary Magdalene at the feet of Jesus after the resurrection that was purchased by the French government. The critic Maxime Du Camp was of the opinion that "his paintings painted with the feet were hardly worse than many paintings painted with the hand".

From 1845, he had a studio on the Rue Visconti, where he died in 1856, aged 50.

== Works ==
Among his notable paintings are:

- Repentance (1828)
- The Parting of Hector and Andromache. (Lille Museum.)
- St. Louis Administering Justice. (Lille Museum.)
- Death of Mary Magdalen (1840) (Église Saint-André de Lille)
- The Holy Family Resting in Egypt (1841)
- Christ in the Sepulchre (1843)
- Edith Finding the Body of Harold (1855)

== Selected paintings ==
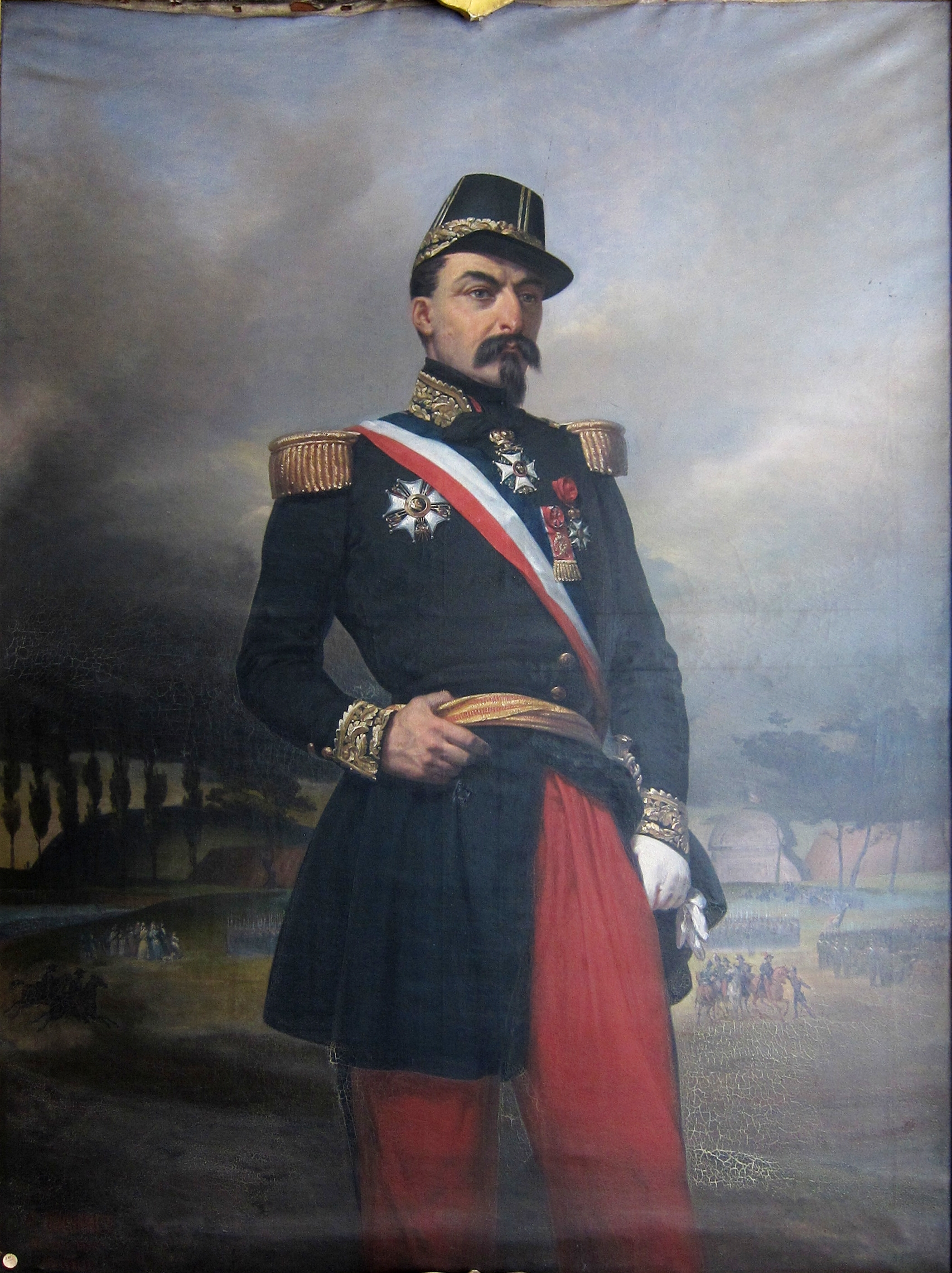
General
Oscar de Négrier

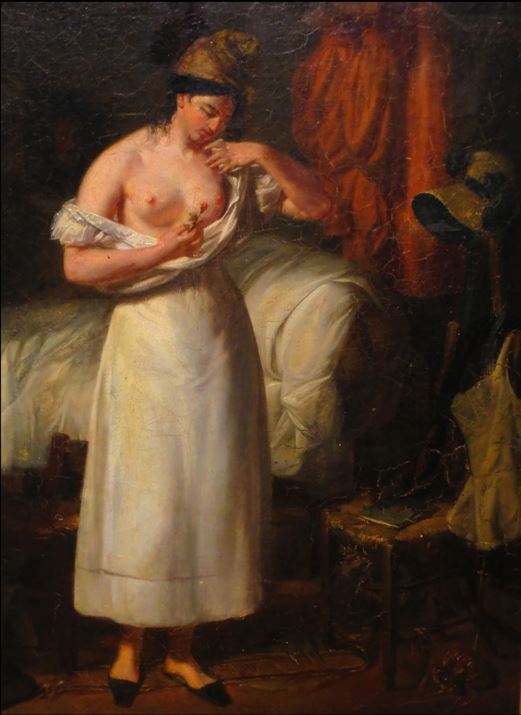
Grisette

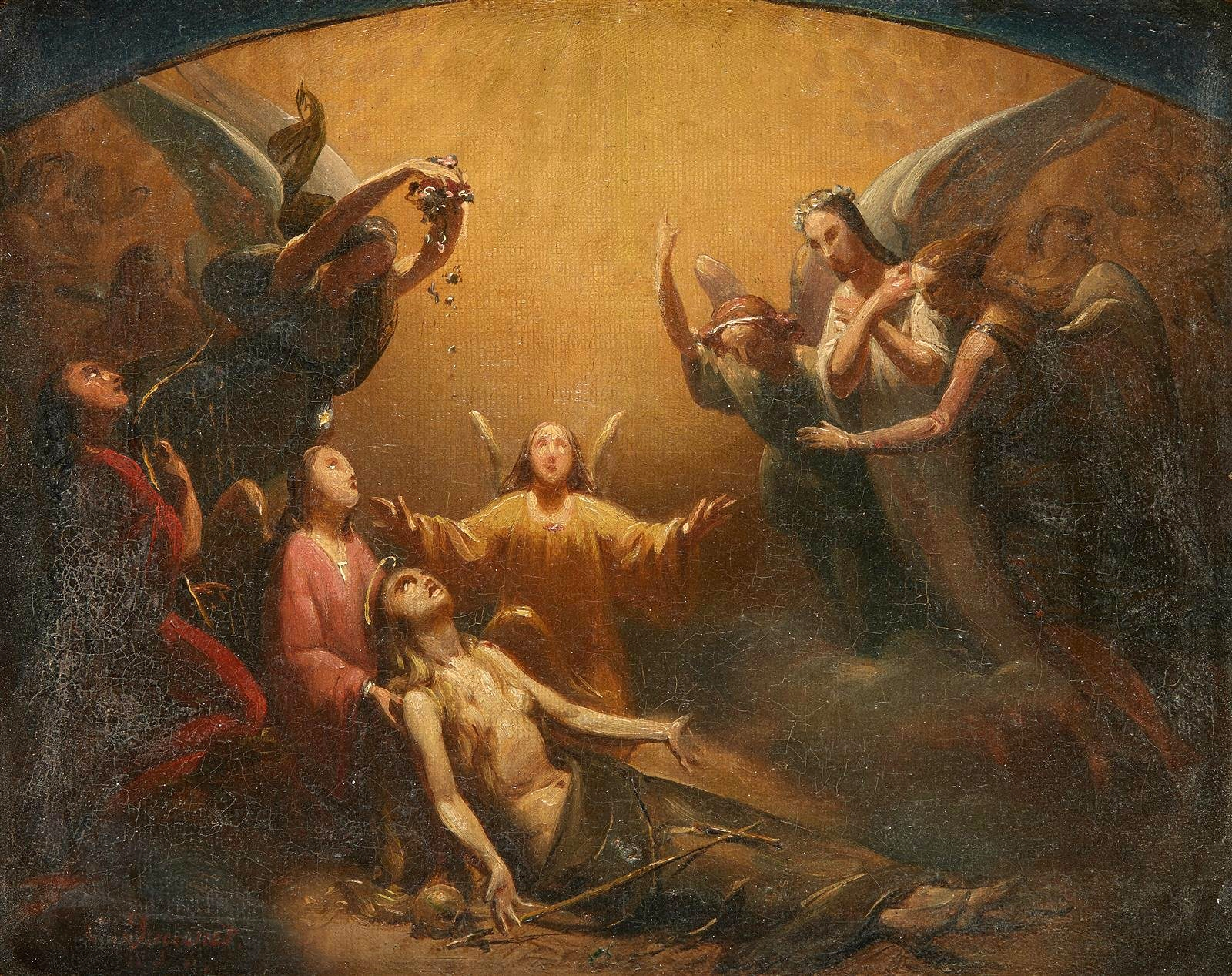
Mary Magdalene in Ecstasy

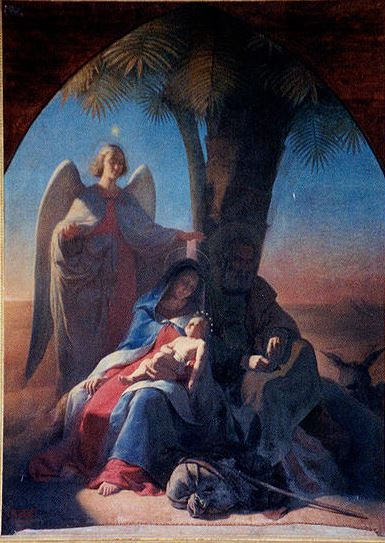
The Holy Family Resting in Egypt

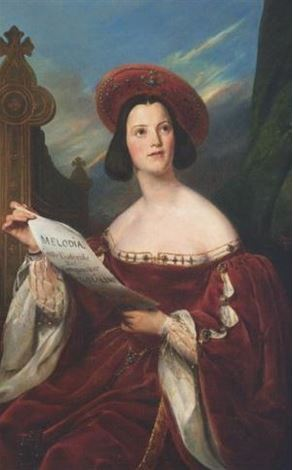
Melodia
