= Edwin Evans (artist) =

American painter (1860–1946)

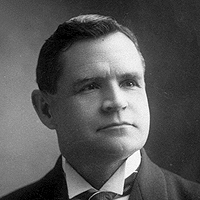
Edwin Evans (date unknown; 1890s?)

Edwin Evans (February 2, 1860, Lehi, Utah - March 3, 1946, Los Angeles) was an American landscape painter and teacher. In 1890, he was one of a group of painters who studied in Paris under the sponsorship of the Church of Jesus Christ of Latter-day Saints (LDS Church), in preparation for painting murals at the nearly completed Salt Lake Temple.

== Biography ==
His father was Bishop David Evans (1804-1883), founder of the city where he was born, which was originally called "Evansville". From an early age, he drew sketches as a hobby, but didn't consider becoming an artist. While he was employed as a railway telegraph operator, his work was noticed by Alonzo Hyde (1848-1910), the son of Orson Hyde, an early LDS Church leader. He encouraged Evans to begin studying art and offered to provide support. Soon after, in the 1880s, Evans and his wife went to Salt Lake City, where he studied with George M. Ottinger and Dan Weggeland.

In 1888, he received further support from Hyde to go to Paris. Two years later, together with John Fairbanks, John Hafen and Lorus Pratt, he was awarded a two-year scholarship to study at the Académie Julian in Paris, where their primary instructor was Albert Rigolot, and they became known as the "French Art Missionaries". Upon their return, they executed the murals and frescoes for the Salt Lake Temple, which was consecrated in 1893. He also created murals for the Cardston Alberta Temple and the Veterans' Hospital in Salt Lake City.

Later that year, with Hafen and James Taylor Harwood, he founded an "Academy of Art" in Salt Lake City. His canvas "Grain Fields" (or "Wheat Field"), painted while he was in France, won Honorable Mention at the Columbian Exposition in Chicago. In 1898, he was appointed President of the "Institute of Fine Arts" at the University of Utah and taught there until 1919. His best-known student was LeConte Stewart. He also gave lessons at his private studios, church schools and the YMCA.

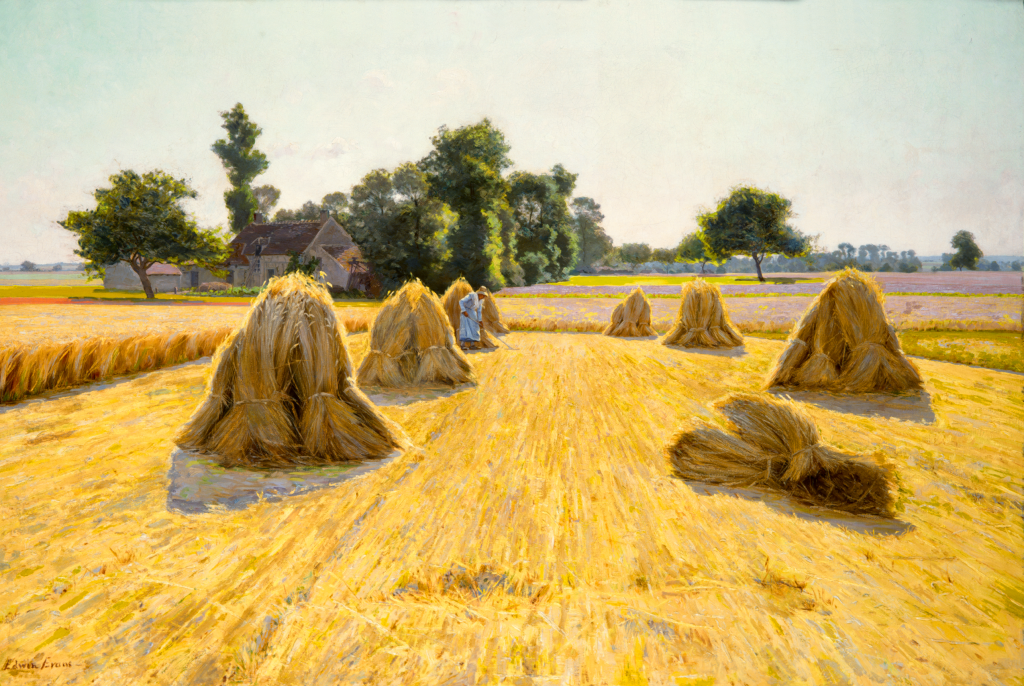
Grain Fields (1890)

During his later years, he returned to Paris for several exhibits, concentrated largely on watercolors and donated many of his paintings to Brigham Young University and Lehi High School. A major retrospective of his work was held in 1941.
