= James Taylor Harwood =

American painter (1860–1940)

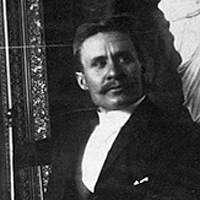
James Taylor Harwood (date unknown)

James Taylor Harwood (8 April 1860, Lehi, Utah – 16 October 1940, Salt Lake City) was an American painter, engraver and art teacher. He was the first artist from Utah to exhibit at the Paris Salon, in 1892.

== Biography ==
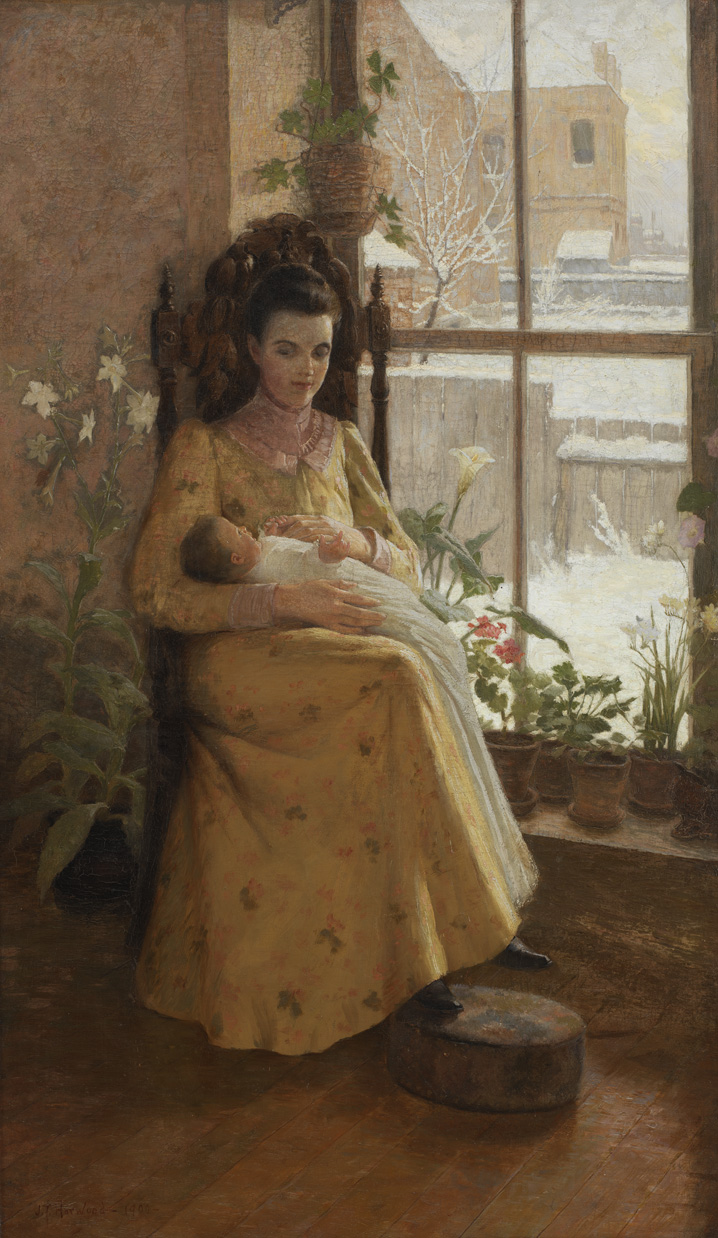
His wife, Harriet, and their son, Lawrence

He was born to James Harwood, a maker of harnesses, and his wife Sarah Jane née Taylor. He displayed an early talent for art; taking lessons with the local painters, George M. Ottinger, Alfred Lambourne and Dan Weggeland. This was followed, in 1885, by studies at the California School of Design in San Francisco, under the direction of Virgil Macey Williams.

He returned to Utah in 1887 and opened a studio, painting portraits and giving lessons. One of his students, Harriet Richards (1870-1922), would later become his wife. Her grandfather, Willard Richards, was an apostle in the LDS Church and a counselor to Brigham Young. By 1888, he had made enough money to go to Paris with his friend and former fellow student, Guy Rose. There, they shared an apartment while studying at the Académie Julian with Jean-Joseph Benjamin-Constant, Jules Joseph Lefebvre and Jean-Paul Laurens. The following year, Harwood passed the entrance exam for the École des beaux-arts, and worked under the direction of Léon Bonnat.

In 1891, he married Richards, who was also in Paris, studying at the Académie Julian. During their honeymoon trip, they stayed in Brittany, at the Pont-Aven Artists' Colony. After returning to Paris, he exhibited his painting, "Preparations for Dinner" at the Salon, which was praised by his former teacher, Bonnat. In 1893, he settled in Salt Lake City. There, together with Edwin Evans and John Hafen, he founded an "Academy of Art". That same year, Harriet exhibited one of her oils in the Utah Pavilion at the World's Columbian Exposition in Chicago, alongside "Preparations for Dinner".

He made numerous trips between Salt Lake City and Paris. During those years, his style evolved from an Academic, realistic approach to something more akin to Impressionism. Harriet died in 1922 and, after an inactive period, he was named President of the Institute of Fine Arts at the University of Utah, in 1923.

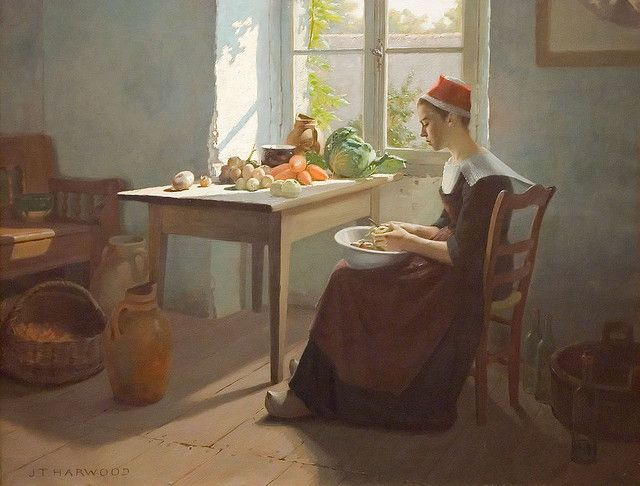
Preparations for Dinner

It was there, in 1927, that he met a young literature student named Ione Godwin. Despite a forty-seven year difference in their ages, they were married in 1929, creating a minor scandal. As a result, he resigned his position and they moved to Paris, where they had two children. He painted (experimenting with Pointillism) and exhibited until 1939, when the impending war forced them to return home. He died there the following year.
