= John Fairbanks =

American landscape painter (1855–1940)

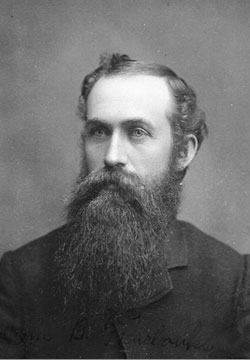
John B Fairbanks (date unknown, 1890s?)

John B Fairbanks (December 27, 1855, in Payson, Utah – June 15, 1940, in Salt Lake City) was an American landscape painter. In 1890, he was one of a group of artists who studied in Paris under the sponsorship of the Church of Jesus Christ of Latter-day Saints (LDS Church), in preparation for painting murals at the nearly completed Salt Lake Temple. He painted murals in the Salt Lake Temple and the Mesa Arizona Temple that still exist today. Fairbanks was the official photographer for the South American expeditions of Benjamin Cluff. Fairbanks was the first artist to live and paint in Zion National Park. He was an early art instructor at Brigham Young Academy and was one of the founding members of the Utah Art Institute. Fairbanks was the father of artists John Leo Fairbanks (painter and sculptor), Ortho Lane Fairbanks (1887-1962; sculptor) and Avard Tennyson Fairbanks (sculptor).

== Biography ==
=== Early life ===
John B Fairbanks was born on December 27, 1855, in Payson, Utah. He was the first Latter-day Saint artist born in Utah territory. His parents were John Boylston Fairbanks (1817-1875) and Sarah H. Van Wagoner Fairbanks (1822-1898). His father was an early pioneer who had come to Utah from Winter Quarters in 1847; and died from pneumonia on May 14, 1875, leaving Fairbanks to care for the family. Although he showed an early interest in art, he had no inclination to pursue it as a career until, in 1877, he visited the studios of John Hafen, an aspiring artist his own age. Fairbanks would sit in Hafen's studio and watch him paint in between working in the field and playing baseball. He would hide his paintings and other works, because he did not want to disappoint his family. When he eventually showed a finished painting to his mother, she initially did not believe he painted it, but was proud of Fairbanks when his sisters confirmed that he had painted it. Hafen became his lifelong friend and mentor. Fairbanks would paint in the evenings and Saturdays.

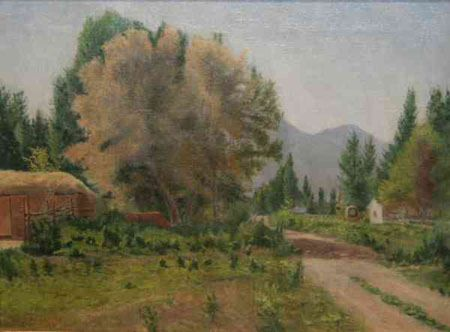
Utah Farm (1893)

=== Missionary service ===
John B Fairbanks served as a missionary for the LDS Church in the Southern States Mission from October 1881 to September 1883. He assumed he would no longer be able to pursue a painting career. Fairbanks married Lilly Annetta Huish on June 24, 1877 in Payson. His paintings were not successful, so he found it necessary to take other work, which ranged from assisting the photographer, George Edward Anderson, to selling newspapers. He painted furniture in his father-in-law's store. Additionally, he worked with Hafen to make and sell crayon enlargements of photos. In 1890, at the request of Hafen, Fairbanks joined Hafen, Edwin Evans, and Lorus Pratt to study at the Académie Julian in Paris on a two-year scholarship from the LDS Church. Their objective was to develop their art skills and techniques in order to design and paint murals for the nearly completed Salt Lake Temple. Their primary instructor was Albert Rigolot, and they became known as the "French Art Missionaries". Fairbanks was the only one of his American colleagues whose art was not accepted in the concours in the first year. Upon their return, they executed the murals and frescoes for the Salt Lake Temple, which was dedicated in 1893. Years later, he also helped to decorate the Church Administration Building and the Mesa Arizona Temple. These temple murals still exist.

=== Career ===
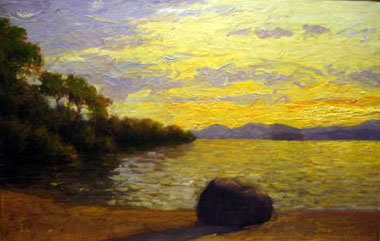
Lake Nikaragua (sic, c. 1901)

After completing murals at the Salt Lake Temple, Fairbanks began teaching one of the first college art classes at Brigham Young Academy (now Brigham Young University). He still received little public recognition despite having established a photographic studio and art gallery. Then, on May 8, 1898, his wife Lillie died from a fall downstairs. She had been carrying their baby son and may have sacrificed herself to save him. The boy, Avard, suffered no serious injuries and grew up to be a well-known sculptor. After the death of his wife, Fairbanks moved his family to Ogden, Utah and became the first supervisor in Ogden public schools. In 1902, struggling to support his seven children, he accepted an offer of employment from Benjamin Cluff to make sketches and photographs on his archaeological expedition to Latin America. There, they intended to discover evidence for the Book of Mormon. Fairbanks moved his family to Alberta, Canada to run a farm, but returned to Salt Lake City due to droughts and difficult winters. Back in Salt Lake City, Fairbanks resumed painting, giving private art lessons and running a small farm to provide for his family. Fairbanks spent time in New York City where he made copies of art pieces from the Metropolitan Museum to sell. Avard Fairbanks joined his father to copy pieces soon after. Fairbanks helped his son cultivate his work and develop his technique, hoping Avard would be able to achieve a level of success that he had not. They returned to Salt Lake City after commissions and finances dwindled. In 1914, Fairbanks accompanied Avard to Paris where he was to study at the Ecole Nationale des Beaux Arts. Here, Fairbanks studied privately.

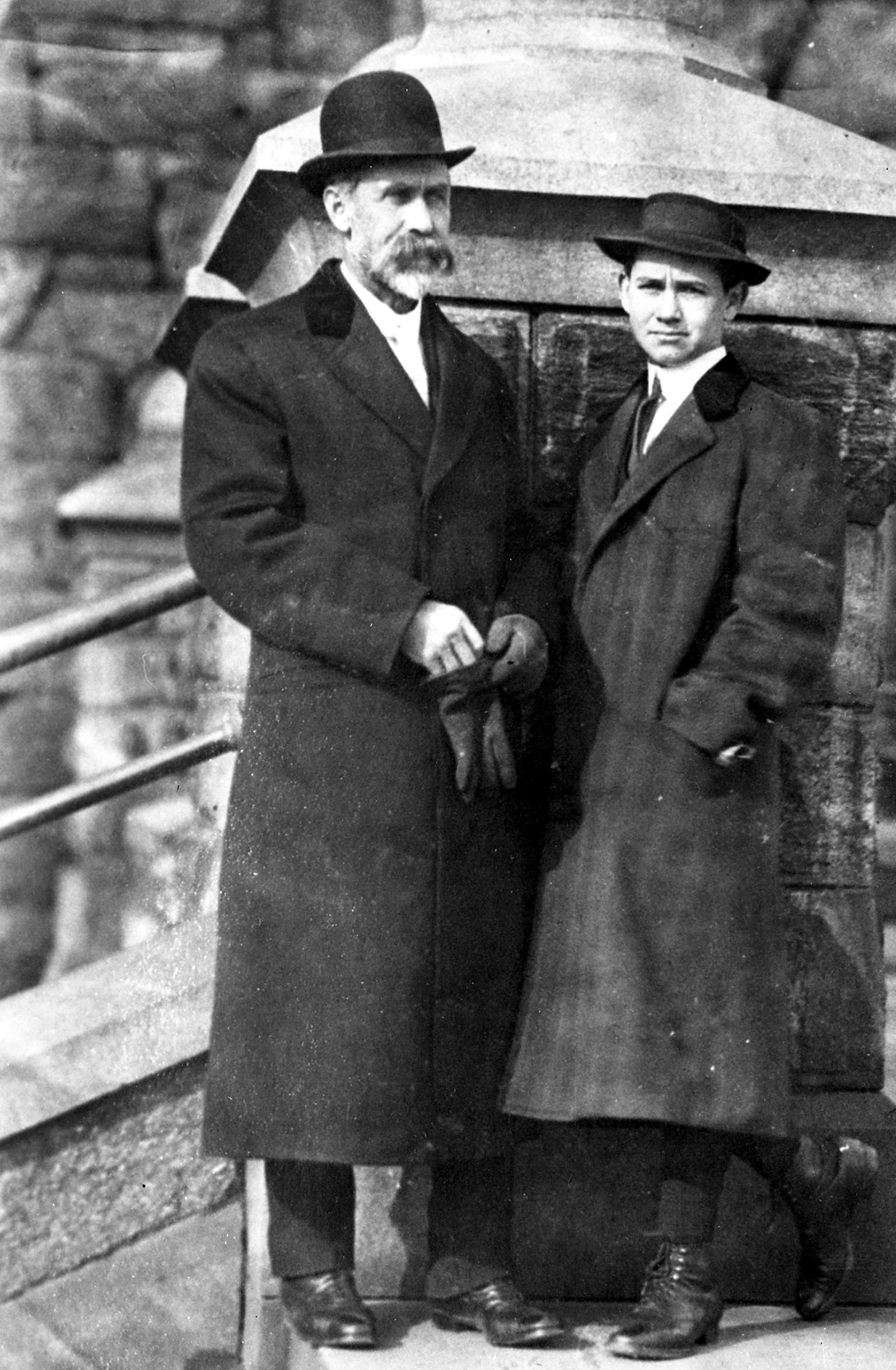
John B Fairbanks with son, Avard Tennyson Fairbanks, 1911, in New York City while both were studying art

During the late 1910s, Fairbanks traveled to Zion National Park to paint. During this time, he created more artworks in this area than any other artist. Additionally, he was the first artist to live and paint in Zion National Park. In 1917, while painting there, he met his second wife, Florence Gifford, who was almost forty years his junior. They married on September 21, 1917, in Salt Lake City and eventually had five more children. Neither his art nor his teaching was financially successful, so he supplemented his income by running a photography studio with his oldest son, John Leo Fairbanks. He was one of the founding members of the Utah Art Institute (now the Utah Division of Arts and Museums). In 1933, Fairbanks and his sons created the Mormon display to tell the story of Mormonism through art for the Columbian Exposition in Chicago. Avard sculpted, J. Leo created stained glass, and Fairbanks painted. Although he painted until the very last days of his life, he never achieved wide recognition. Fairbanks died on June 15, 1940, at the age of 84 from recurring kidney stones.

== Style ==
Fairbanks received art training in Paris, yet his landscape paintings have a distinct Utah style. He used "soft and rustic naturalistic impressionism" in his paintings.

== Children ==
Fairbanks had eleven children with Lillie Huish among whom were John Leo Fairbanks (painter and sculptor), Ortho Lane Fairbanks (sculptor) and Avard Tennyson Fairbanks (sculptor). With Florence Gifford, he had an additional five children.
