= Mary Teasdel =

American impressionist artist (1863–1937)

Mary H. Teasdel (November 6, 1863 – 1937) was an impressionist artist and the first female Utah native to exhibit in the Paris Salon.

== Personal life ==
Born to Mr. and Mrs. S. P. Teasdel on November 6, 1863, in Salt Lake City, Teasdel was raised in a relatively wealthy family and was afforded many privileges. Her father was a successful merchant and provided for her abundant education in the arts, although he did not approve of her investment in art as a career.

== Education ==
Teasdel's family ensured she was given a proper education (or what was considered such in her area at the time) and she was trained musically and artistically in her early life. She studied under George Ottinger at the University of Deseret and graduated in 1886 with a degree in art and music. She continued to study in Utah under J. T. Harwood. Beyond her training in her native land, Teasdel went on to travel to Paris and study under many great artists including William Benjamin-Constant, Jules Simon, and James Whistler.

== Career ==
Teasdel's paintings were of the impressionist tradition and usually depicted landscapes and still lifes, although she also ventured into the world of portraiture. Perhaps the greatest mark of her achievement was her exhibition in the Paris Salon in 1901, making her the first female Utahn, and second Utahn ever, to appear there. A group of her miniatures were displayed at the Salon and later two other miniatures were included in the International French Exposition. Returning to Utah after her three years in France, Teasdel continued to produce artwork. She also served as the president of the governing board for the Utah Art Institute and taught art in Salt Lake City schools.

Of her profession, Teasdel wrote, "True art is the personal expression of an idea in an artistic way. To be able to do this one must understand the language of art, its intentions and limitations. Art is infinite in its various expressions and should enter every part of our lives because art means harmony, beauty, and the eternal fitness of things."

In 1922, Teasdel exhibited at the MacDowell Club in Los Angeles along with Adolpho Brougler and Alice Daniels. Writing for the Los Angeles Times, Antony Anderson described Teasdel's "group of little water color paintings" as "very crisp and clean in handling, full of light and air." Some of the examples of her work included "Early Morning," "Windy Hilltop," "Purple Asters," "A Beach Town Street," "Los Angeles Garden," and "November."

== See also ==
Martha Bradley's "Mary Teasdel: Yet Another American in Paris" was originally published in the Utah Historical Quarterly, Volume 58, Number 3, 1990 and is available online via Issuu and archived at the Internet Archive on 14 February 2023.
