= Pierre Petit (photographer) =

French photographer (1831–1909)

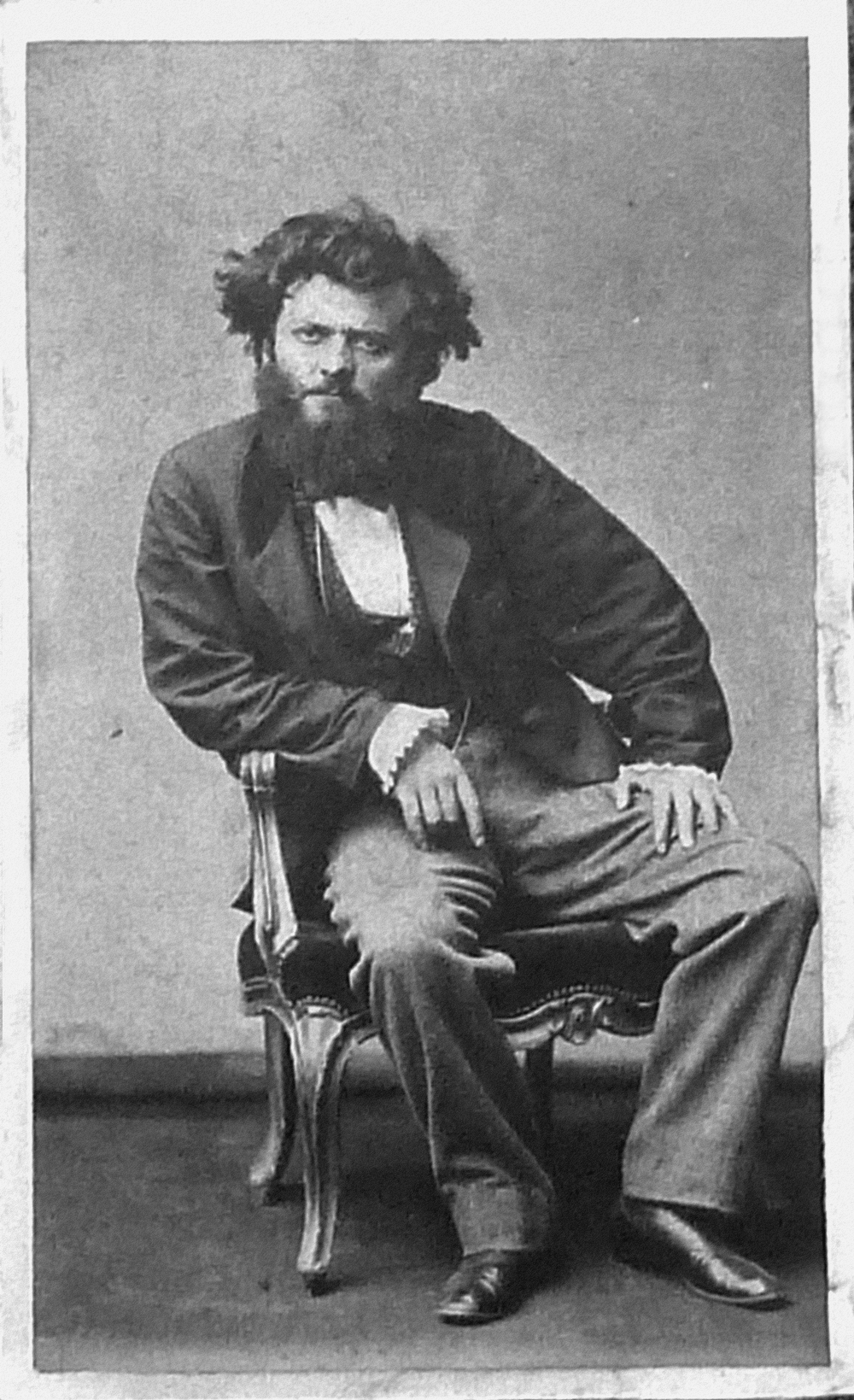
Self-portrait (c. 1870)

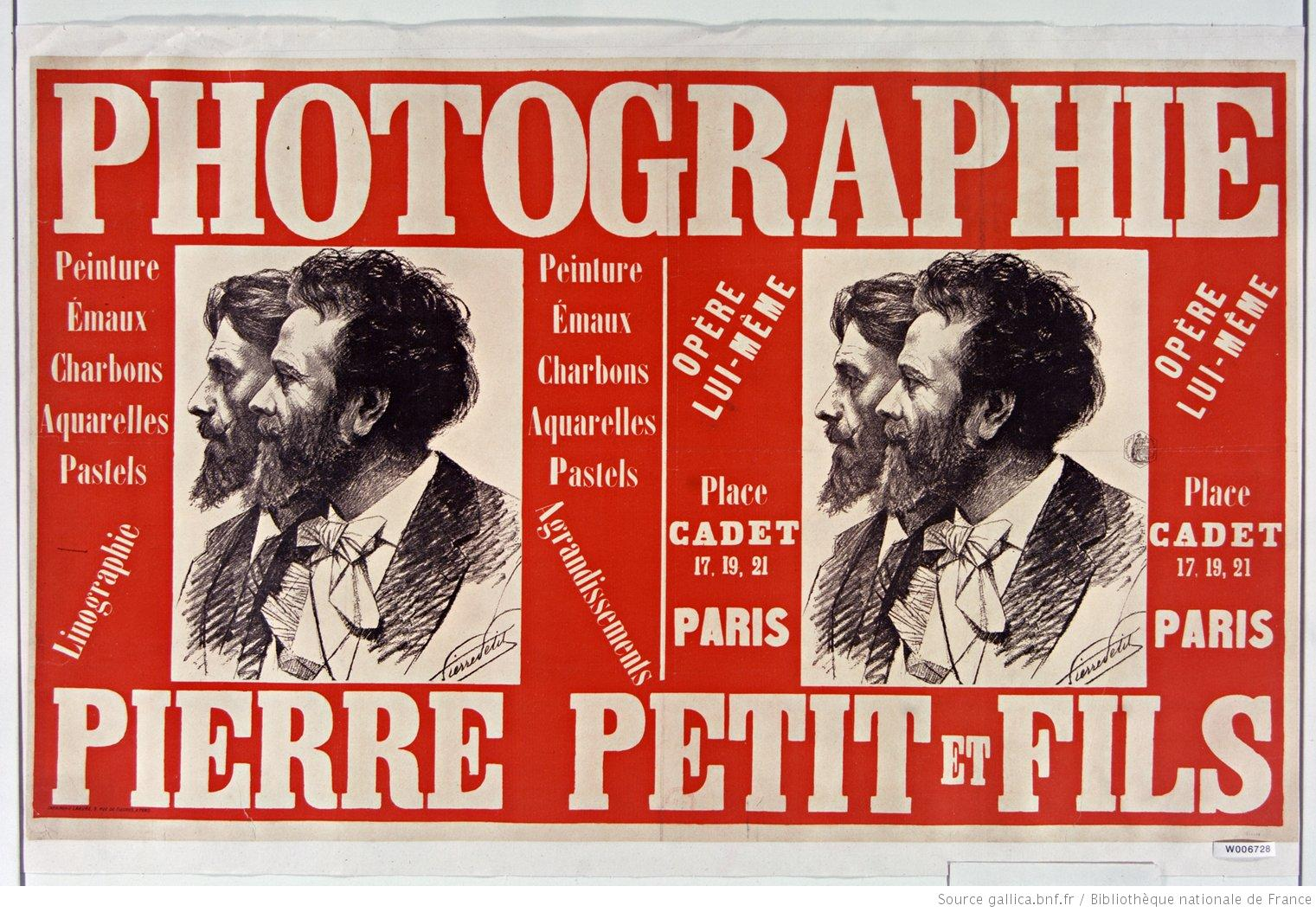
Poster for the workshop

Pierre Petit is not to be confused with (Jean) Pierre Yves-Petit (1886–1969), another French photographer who usually operated under the name Yvon.

Pierre Lanith Petit (French: [pjɛʁ pəti]; 15 August 1832 – 16 February 1909) was a French photographer. He is sometimes credited as Pierre Lamy Petit.

== Work ==
Petit learned photography in Paris in the workshop of André-Adolphe-Eugène Disdéri (1819–1889) (together with 76 other employees). In 1858, he opened his own workshop in Paris with Antoine René Trinquart, later to be called La Photographie des Deux Mondes. This proved to be very successful and workshops were opened in Baden-Baden and Marseille (in partnership with Emile Cazalis).

In his lifetime he made thousands of photographs. In 1908 he handed over the business to his son.

Some highlights in Petit's career:

- He was the official photographer of the International Exposition of 1867.
- He went to New York City several times to report on the construction of the Statue of Liberty.
- Petit made many photographs of the Siege of Paris (1870–71).
- In 1898, he made some attempts in underwater photography.
- He exhibited many times at the Société française de photographie (SFP).

== Publications ==
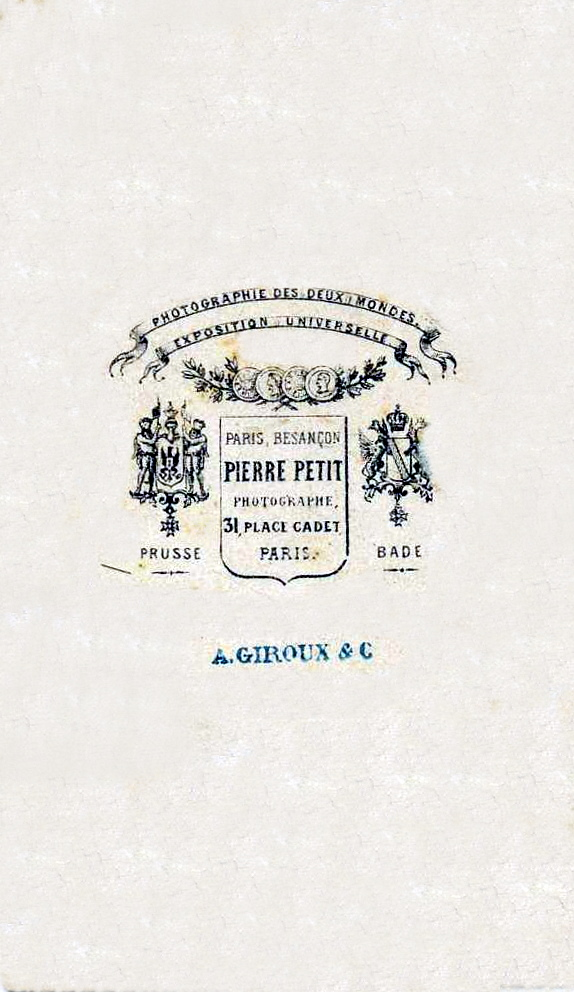
The Pierre Petit Trademark

- Galerie des hommes de jour, a series of photographs of famous French people of the day, published in 1861
- l'Episcopat français, clergé de Paris, a series of photographs of the clergy of Paris

== Museums ==
Museums that hold large collections of his photographs:

- Musée Nicéphore-Niépce in Chalon-sur-Saône
- Musée d'Orsay in Paris
- National Library of France in Paris
- National Portrait Gallery, London

== Photographs ==
=== Portraits ===
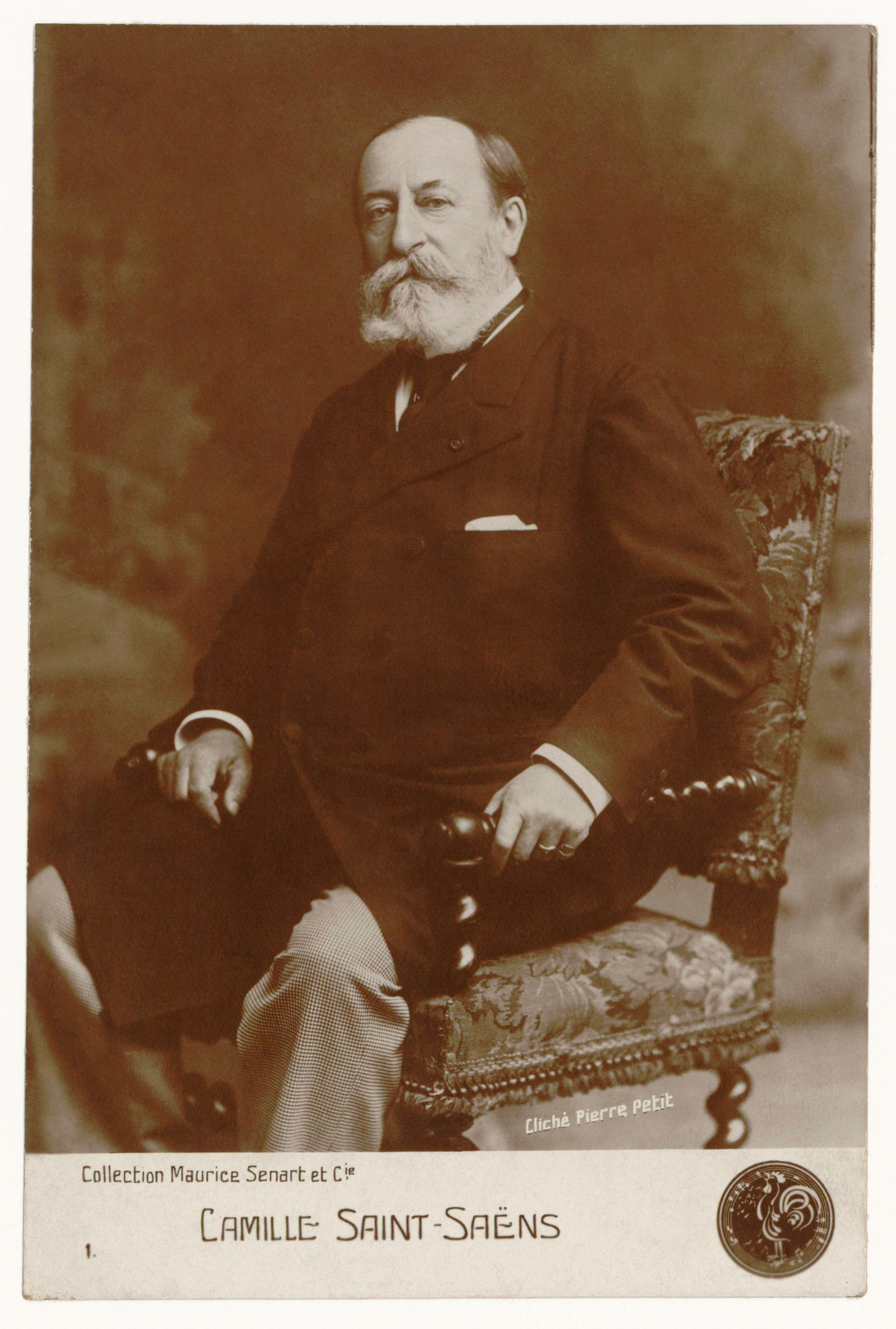
Camille Saint-Saëns (1900)

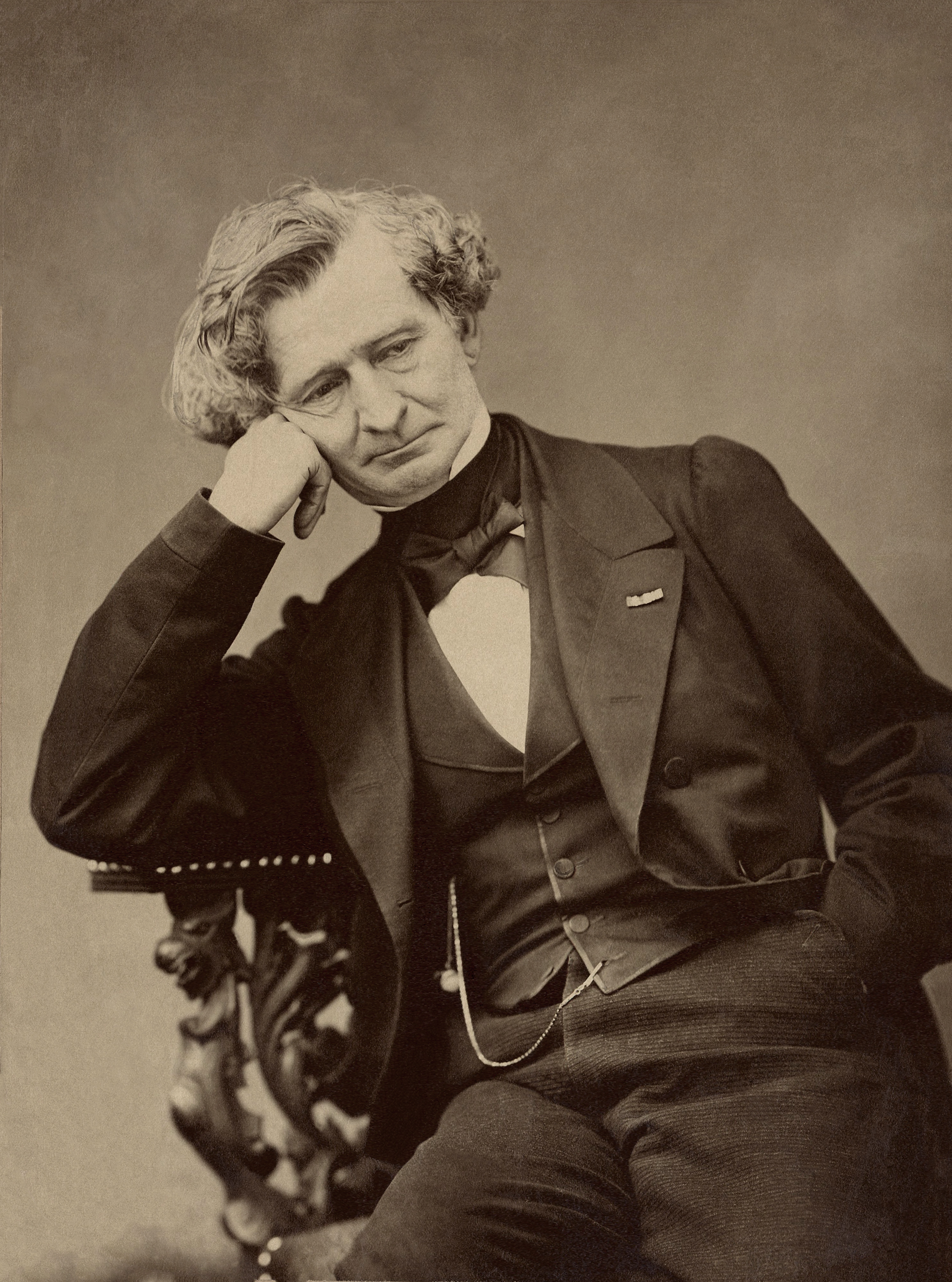
Hector Berlioz (1863)

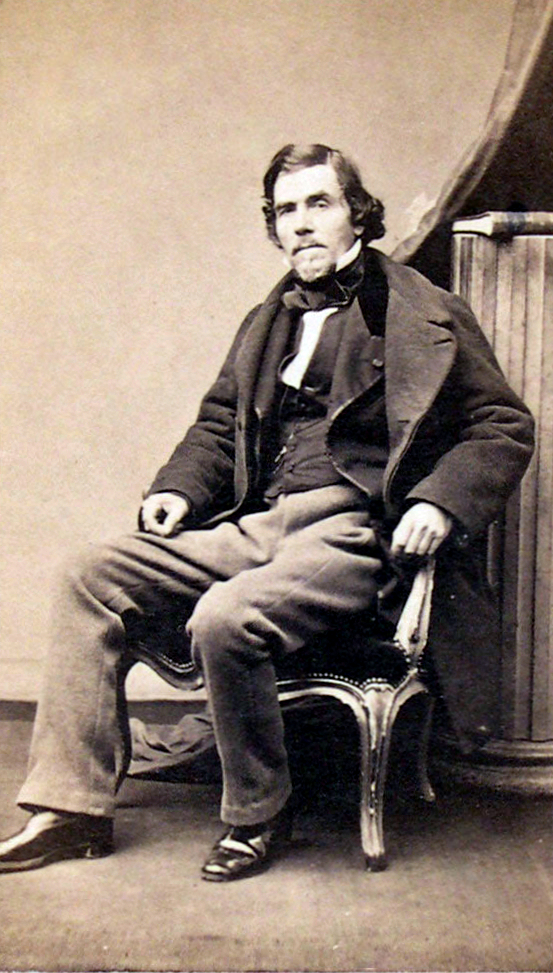
Eugène Delacroix

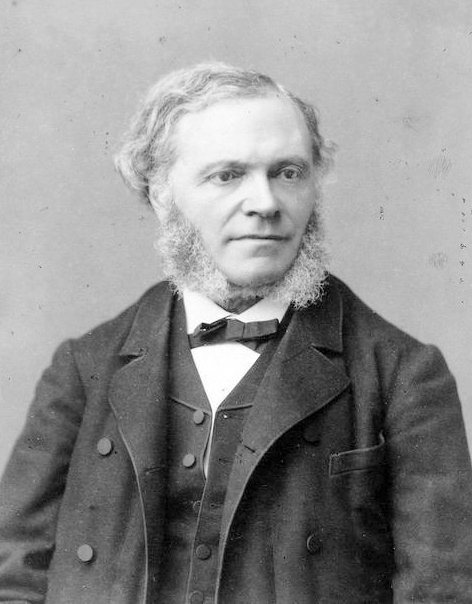
César Franck

=== Others ===
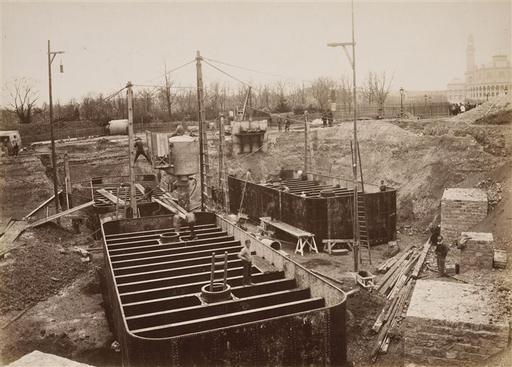
The foundation for the Eiffel Tower (1887)

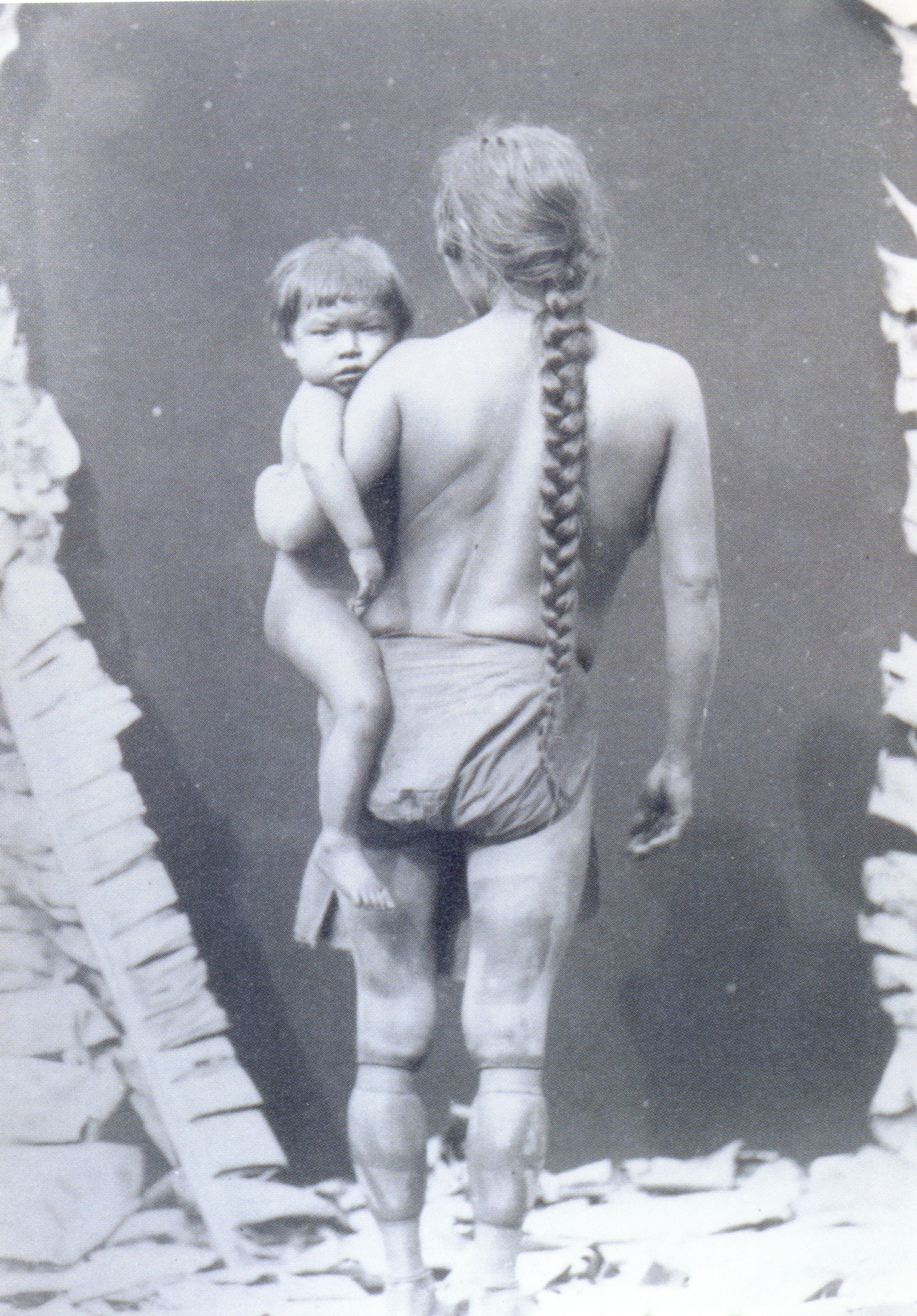
Kalina woman with child (1882)

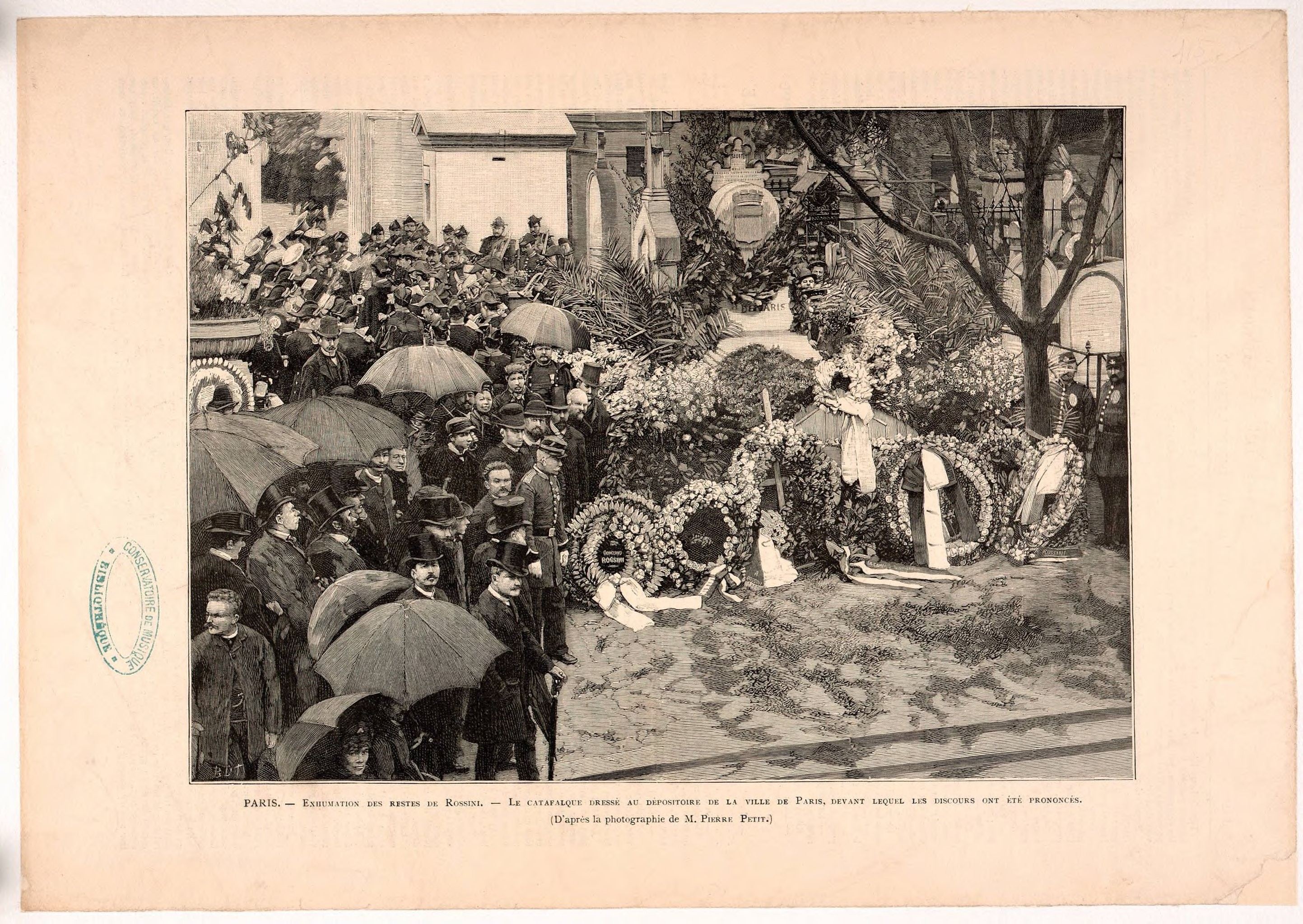
Exhumation of the remains from Gioachino Rossini. Wood-engraving based on one of his photographs (1887)
