= Dan Weggeland =

Norwegian-born American painter (1827–1918)

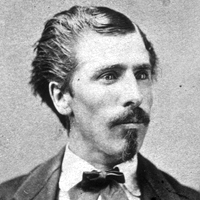
Dan Weggeland (before 1900)

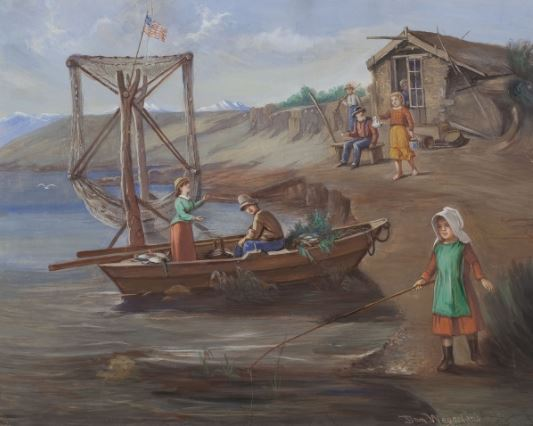
Homestead Family on Utah Lake

Danquart Anthon Weggeland, known as Dan (March 31, 1827 – June 2, 1918) was an artist and teacher in the early Utah Territory. He was sometimes referred to as the "Father of Utah Art".

== Biography ==
He was born in the city of Kristiansand, Norway. At age sixteen, he began studying with a portrait painter in Christiania and, at the age of twenty, went to Copenhagen, where he eventually studied at the Danish Royal Academy of Art. After two years in Copenhagen, he returned to Christiania, where he worked as a portrait painter and did some work for theatres.

In 1854, he was introduced to the Church of Jesus Christ of Latter-day Saints (LDS Church). One of his main teachers was a missionary who had also attended the Royal Academy of Art, C. C. A. Christensen. After being baptized as a member of the LDS Church, he moved to England. There, He served as a church missionary from 1857 to 1861. He then went to New York City, where he studied with Daniel Huntington and George Peter Alexander Healy.

He went to Florence, Nebraska in 1862, from which he left in August for Utah Territory. He journeyed there in the Henry W. Miller Company of Mormon pioneers. He made numerous sketches along the way.

During his early days in Utah Territory, he would occasionally trade a painting for a pair of well-knit socks. His first major artistic work in Utah was his joint commission with his mentor, Christensen, to do a series of paintings from the Bible and Book of Mormon. This commission came from Dimick B. Huntington.

He made many paintings involving Mormon pioneers. He also did murals for the St. George, Manti, Logan and Salt Lake Temples of the LDS Church. In addition, he served as an art instructor for most of the church's art missionaries before they went to France.

He died in Salt Lake City, Utah. His works may be seen at the Utah Museum of Fine Arts
