= Main Street (Greater Salt Lake City) =

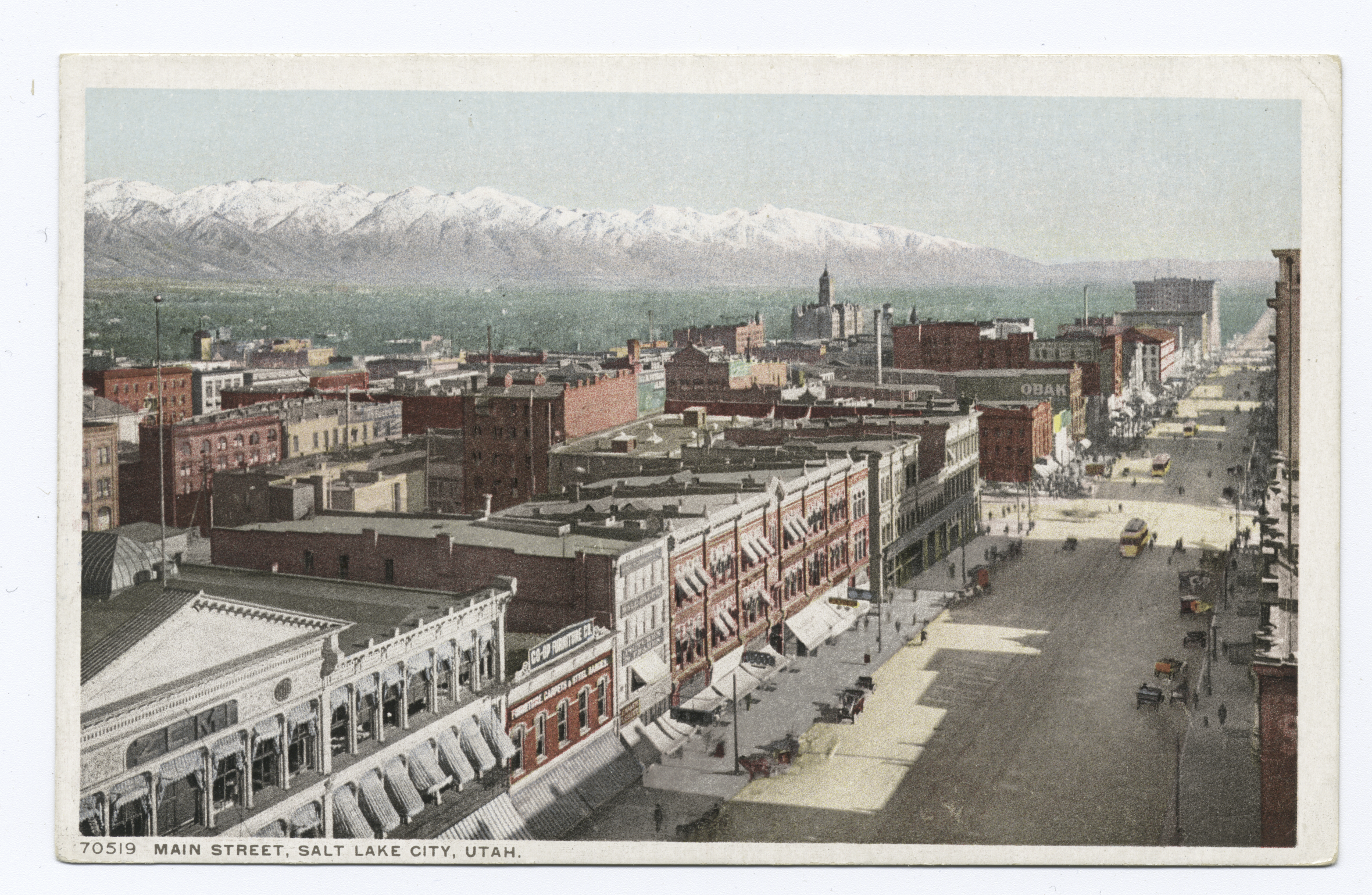
Main Street in Salt Lake City, early 20th Century

Main Street is the most important commercial street in Salt Lake City, Utah, United States, though it also extends south into the cities of South Salt Lake, Millcreek, and Murray. Its commercial importance is almost totally derived from the few blocks of the street which are immediately south of Temple Square that have attracted banks, major retailers, and heavy foot traffic throughout Salt Lake City's history; the long southern extension of Main Street south of about 500 and 600 South, in contrast, is always in the shadow of State Street (one block to the east), which (due to width, speed limit, and restraint of cross traffic) is more designed for the long-distance automobile traffic that is common away from downtown.

== Route description ==
=== Murray ===
Main Street begins in Murray at a four-way intersection with 4500 South and Auto Boulevard. Auto Boulevard is effectively a southern continuation of Main Street, though it immediately begins a curve to the east and intersects with State Street. Main Street is proposed to be extended a short distance south of this intersection (displacing the north end of Auto Boulevard) before splitting into a new one-way pair in which car traffic will be routed southward on Box Elder Street via a new connecting road and will be directed onto Main Street from the south via Hanaur Street.

North of its current terminus, Main Street leads through a former industrial area that is being redeveloped as transit oriented development associated with the Murray North TRAX station before leaving Murray on a bridge over Big Cottonwood Creek just a few blocks from the terminus.

=== Millcreek ===
The segment of Main Street within Millcreek is also just a few blocks because it passes through the narrow western end of the city. The area is mostly used for industrial and wholesale purposes.

=== South Salt Lake ===
The south end of South Salt Lake's portion of Main Street passes a park and small retail and office developments before the surroundings revert to industrial- or wholesale-related businesses. North of 3300 South, the mixture of frontage becomes more varied, with retail, office and residential buildings mixed in with industrial and wholesale ones. Main Street crosses Mill Creek at about 3000 South, and a UTA-owned abandoned railroad spur runs along the south side of the creek between Main Street at the TRAX Red and Blue Lines' route at 200 West. The Street continues north through areas with a similar mix of land uses, but also passes the South Salt Lake Police Department headquarters at Sunset Avenue and a Granite School District elementary school plus administrative building housed in a former hospital at 2500 South before passing under Interstate 80, crossing the S Line (formerly known as Sugar House Streetcar) right-of-way, and entering Salt Lake City at 2100 South. Main Street is a four lane road (with or without a center turn lane) throughout South Salt Lake and has sidewalks almost everywhere. Main Street north of 3300 South in South Salt Lake was Utah State Route 202 from 1961 to 1967.

=== Southern Salt Lake City ===
Soon after entering Salt Lake City, Main Street (which is three to four lanes wide with full bicycle lanes as well south of downtown) passes the sprawling O. C. Tanner headquarters before passing small residential, retail, and office developments south of 1300 South. Near 1300 South, the street also passes Smith's Ballpark and Horizonte High School. North of 1300 South, larger-scale retail developments and some remnant industrial uses become more dominant. TRAX light rail tracks enter the median of Main Street from 700 South and continue downtown.

=== Downtown Salt Lake City ===
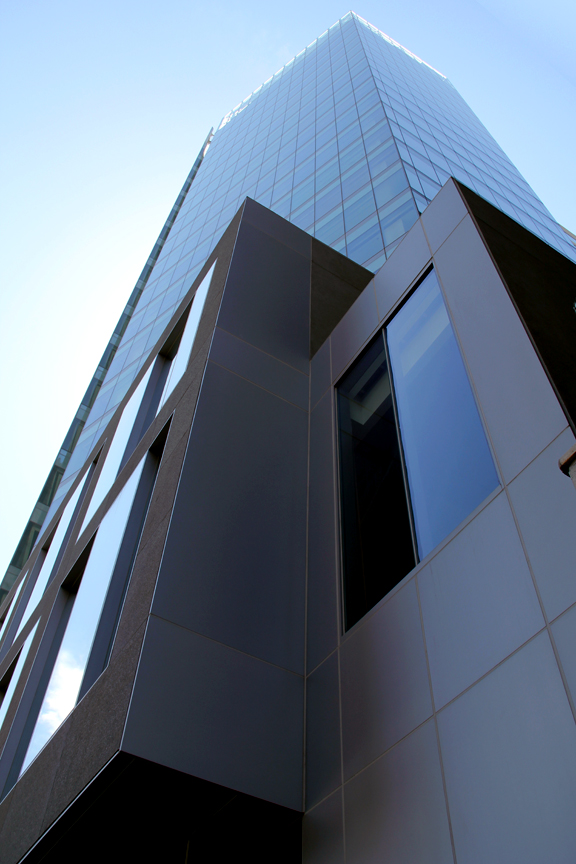
222 Main building in Salt Lake City

In downtown, Main Street consists of wide sidewalks on both sides, TRAX light rail tracks (and electrification poles) in the middle, one narrow lane in each direction with Shared lane markings (sharrows) on continuous green painted strips to encourage use by bicycles, and intermittent on-street parking and delivery-only areas. The wide sidewalks are broken up in some places by outdoor restaurant seating and landscaping elements, including many mature trees. There is only one driveway fronting onto Main Street between 400 South and South Temple. Some of the many notable and historic buildings on Main Street downtown are (from south to north):

- First Security Bank Building
- Frank E. Moss United States Courthouse
- Exchange Place Historic District
- Wells Fargo Center (Salt Lake City)
- Gallivan Plaza
- 222 Main
- One Utah Center
- Continental Bank Building (Salt Lake City)
- Walker Center
- Kearns Building
- Eccles Theater
- McIntyre Building
- City Creek Center
  - (ZCMI Cast Iron Front)

=== Main Street Plaza ===
The Church of Jesus Christ of Latter-day Saints-owned Main Street pedestrian plaza extends for one block along the east side of Temple Square. The Salt Lake Temple and the Joseph Smith Memorial Building face directly onto the plaza. The monument marking the origin of the address system and the Salt Lake Meridian is at the southwest corner of the plaza, next to the Brigham Young Monument.

=== North end ===
Main Street continues north of the pedestrian plaza, starting at an intersection with North Temple and the steep driveway leading down to underground parking beneath the pedestrianized section. It immediately starts climbing Capitol Hill and passes the LDS Conference Center and Alfred McCune Home before reaching a five-way intersection with 300 North and Columbus Street at the southwest corner of the Utah State Capitol Building's grounds. Utah State Route 186 turns from 300 North to Columbus Street at this intersection, while city-maintained 300 North continues west and Main Street continues north but veers slightly westward, losing its alignment with the Salt Lake Meridian. A lot of traffic from the south turns onto Columbus Street (which is at a very acute angle to the northern continuation of Main Street) instead of continuing on Main Street here since State Route 186 provides a through route to the north on Victory Road without sharp turns or steep grades. Main Street, in contrast, continues north-northwest through residential areas to descend a steep hill and end at Girard Avenue (560 North), where traffic heading north must turn west to reach 200 West or 300 West (US-89). Overall in its northernmost two and a half blocks, Main Street moves 110 address units west.

== Other Segments ==
A detached segment of Main Street also exists running from 5900 South to 6100 South (and beyond, in the form of a parking lot associated with the Murray Heritage Center, to Creek Drive) in southern Murray; the name Main Street was applied to it due to its alignment with the Salt Lake Meridian, but without a connection to the main segment of Main Street. Moreover, in Midvale, just south of Murray, 700 West is also known as Main Street, despite its not being aligned with the Salt Lake Meridian, and several unrelated historic streets elsewhere in Salt Lake County are also called Main Street despite the county having a mostly-unified addressing system. For example, there is a Main Street in Magna, though it follows 2700 South in the Salt Lake County scheme.

== Light rail ==
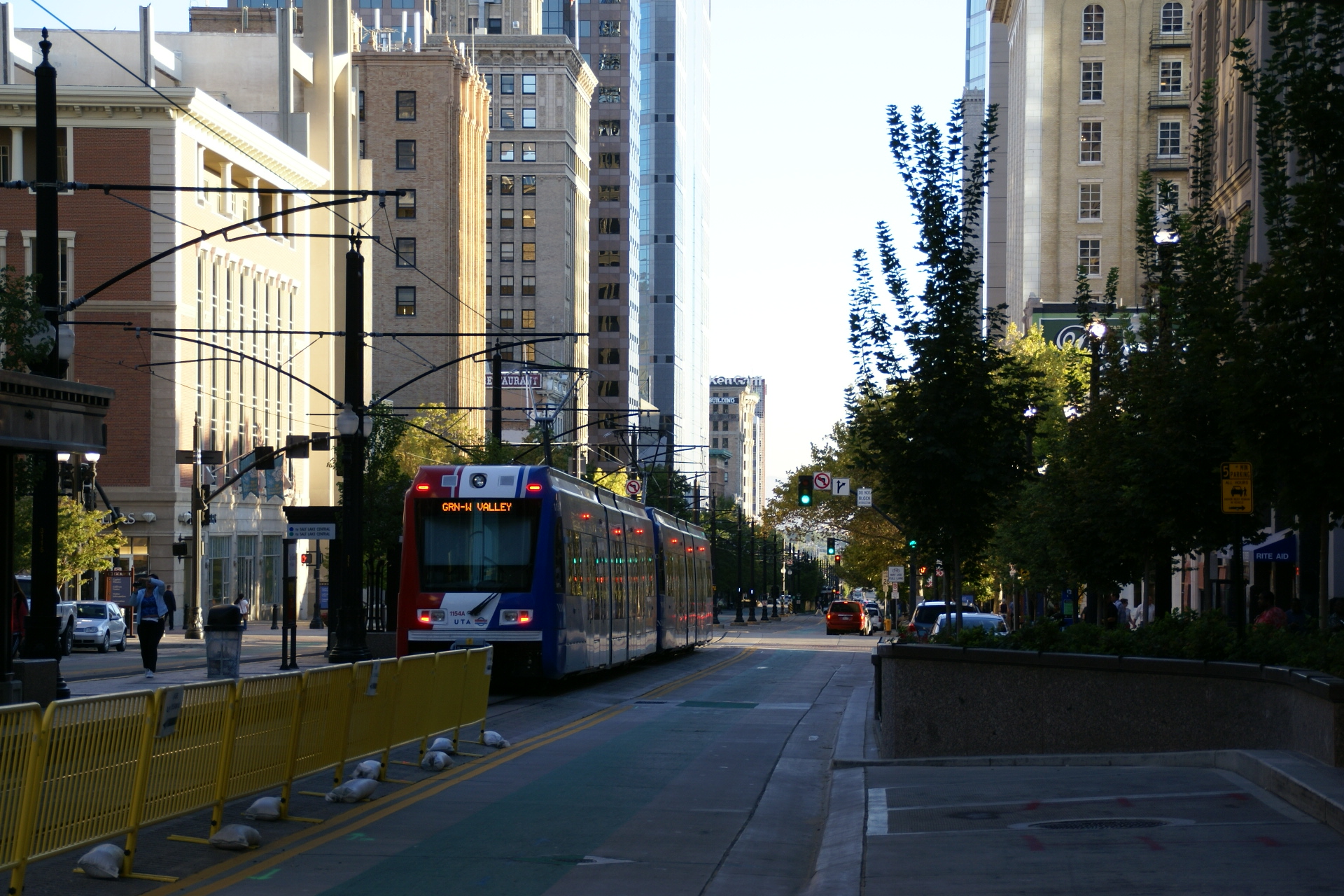
Main Street in downtown Salt Lake City looking south

TRAX light rail has run in the median of Main Street from 700 South to South Temple since 1999, recapitulating streetcars that previously connected Main Street to the rest of downtown, to other neighborhoods, and to a few further-out destinations. South of 700 South, the modern TRAX system instead uses the former Salt Lake and Utah and Union Pacific lines running two blocks west of Main Street, so the trains can attain high speeds in their dedicated corridor while never being far from Main Street. The Red Line branches off of the main north–south line at a half grand union at 400 South Main Street and heads toward University of Utah. The three stations in the median of Main Street downtown are Courthouse (on the north side of 500 South), Gallivan Plaza (on the north side of 300 South), and City Center (on the north side of 100 South).

== Addressing ==
Except on Capitol Hill, Main Street runs along the north–south axis of the Salt Lake County addressing system (essentially the Salt Lake Meridian), so addresses east of Main Street include the word East and addresses west of Main Street include the word West unless the address is along a north–south street that, like Main Street, has an official non-numeric name (see Salt Lake County addressing system). On Capitol Hill, there are some addresses that are numbered as west of the Meridian even though they are east of Main Street; this is due to Main Street's turn to the northwest at 300 North, while the north–south numbering split follows Columbus Street north of this intersection.

South of South Temple (the system's east–west axis), buildings on the east side get odd-numbered addresses and buildings on the west side get even-numbered addresses, while north of South Temple, this is reversed.

== History ==
Main Street was originally known as East Temple because it ran along the east side of the temple block. West Temple (including Utah State Route 270) retains its analogous name, as do the east–west streets South Temple and North Temple. Notable structures that previously existed on Main Street include:

- Derks Field
- Utah Theatre
- ZCMI
- ZCMI Center Mall
- Crossroads Plaza mall
- Council House
