= List of tallest buildings in Salt Lake City =

Skyline of Salt Lake City
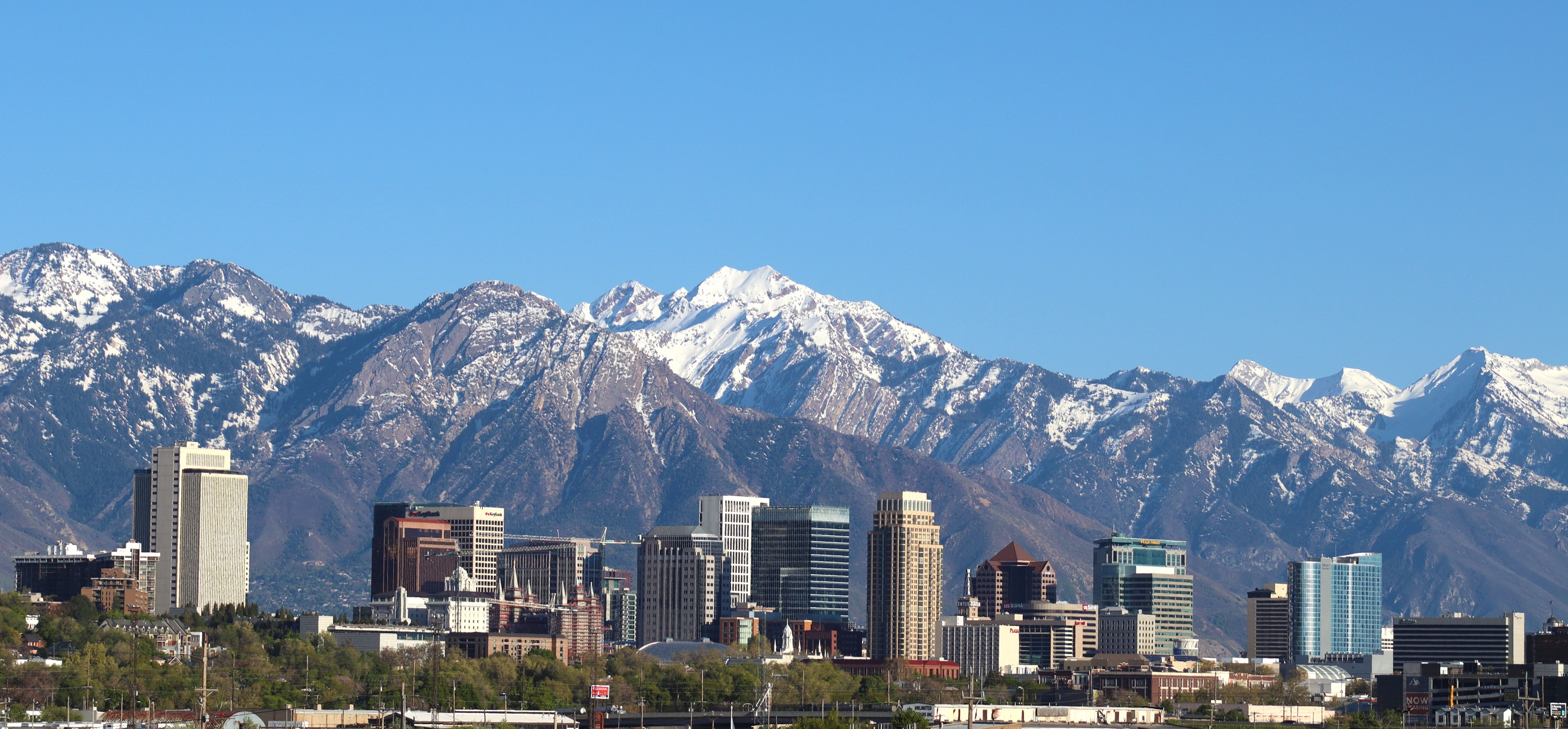
- Downtown Salt Lake City in front of the Wasatch Range in 2024
- Tallest building: Astra Tower (2024)
- Tallest building height: 449 ft (136.8 m)

Number of tall buildings (2026)
- Taller than 75 m (246 ft): 22
- Taller than 100 m (328 ft): 11

Number of tall buildings — feet
- Taller than 200 ft (61.0 m): 30
- Taller than 300 ft (91.4 m): 16

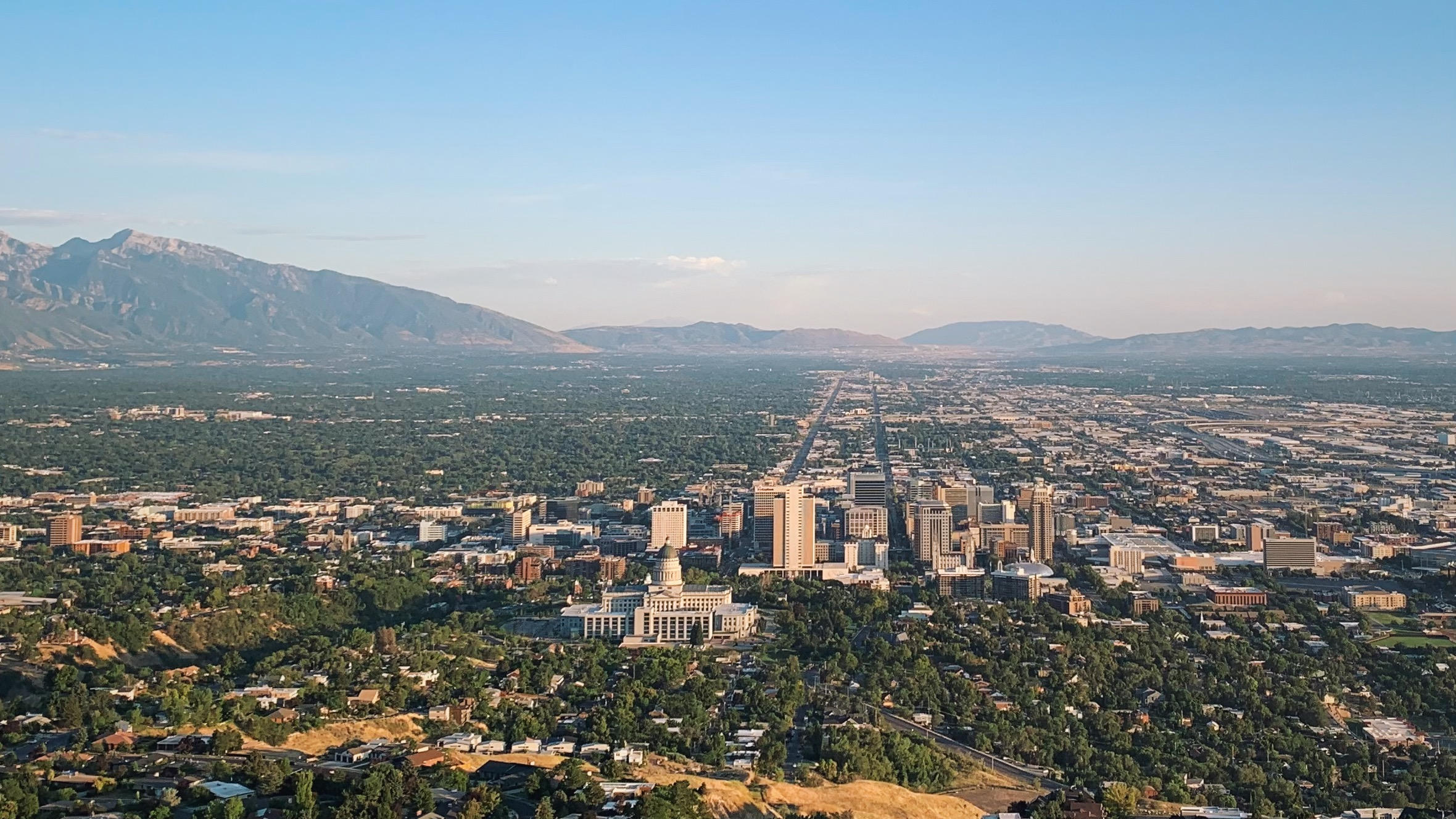
Salt Lake City from Ensign Peak in 2020

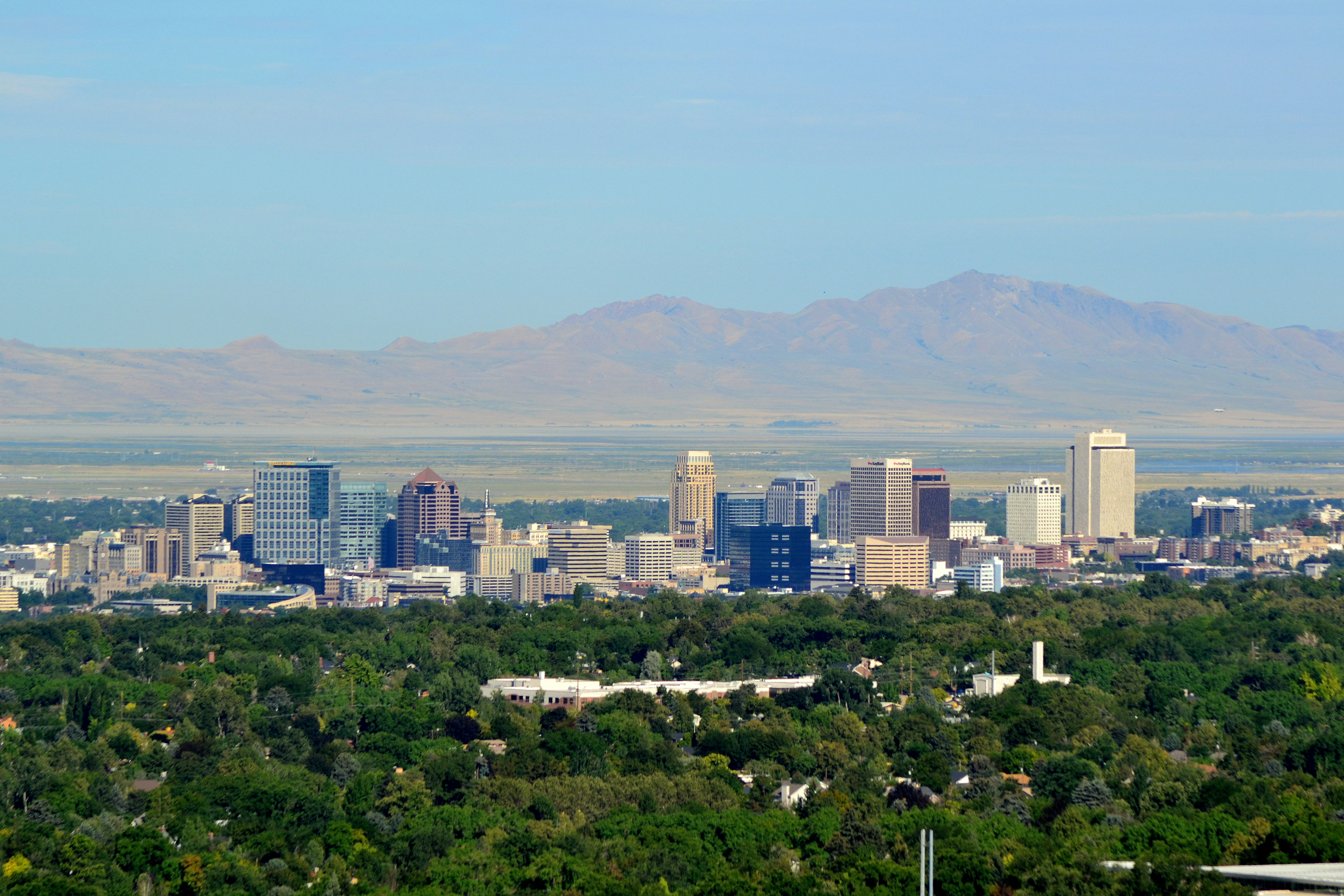
Salt Lake City's skyline, looking west, in 2011

Salt Lake City is the capital and largest city of the U.S. state of Utah. Anchoring its metropolitan area of 1.2 million inhabitants and the larger Wasatch Front of 2.8 million residents, Salt Lake City is home to the vast majority of Utah's tallest buildings. The city has 30 buildings taller than 200 feet (61 m) as of 2026. 16 of these have a height greater than 300 feet (91 m), the fourth most in the Mountain states after Las Vegas, Denver, and Phoenix. The tallest building in Salt Lake City is Astra Tower, a 449 ft (137 m), 40-story residential high-rise completed in 2024.

Shortly after the city's founding by the Mormon pioneers in 1847, work began on the Salt Lake Temple, which took 40 years to construct. Dedicated in 1893, the 222 ft (68 m) structure, the largest temple of the Church of Jesus Christ of Latter-day Saints (LDS Church) by floor area, has become an icon of Salt Lake City. It was the tallest building in the city for only a year, as the 256 ft (78 m) Salt Lake City and County Building, the city's seat of government, was completed in 1894. The Utah State Capitol was completed in 1916, becoming the city's tallest due to its dome. The first multi-story high-rise in Salt Lake City was the 10-story Kearns Building, built in 1911; the 220 ft (67 m) Walker Center opened soon after in 1912. Unlike many major American cities, Salt Lake City's skyline changed little in the 1920s. Due to the Great Depression and World War II, no high-rises were built from 1930 to 1961.

Skyscraper development resumed in the 1960s with the construction of the Zions Bank Building and the South Temple Tower that decade. In 1973, the Church Office Building was built near Salt Lake Temple to hold offices for the LDS Church. At 420 ft (128 m), it surpassed the state capitol as the tallest building in the state. More office towers were completed in the 1980s and 1990s, including the 422 ft (129 m) Wells Fargo Center in 1998, which took the title of tallest building from the Church Office Building. Since the 2000s, high-rise constructed has shifted towards residential and hotel purposes. The mixed-use City Creek Center development, which opened in 2012, incorporates several existing buildings, but also instigated the construction of residential towers such as 99 West on South Temple and The Regent. A construction boom in the 2020s has altered the city's skyline, most notably with Astra Tower, The Worthington, and 95 State at City Creek, which are all among the city's ten tallest buildings.

Most high-rises in Salt Lake City are situated in downtown. A distinctive characteristic of Salt Lake City's skyline is its uniquely large city blocks, measuring 660 ft (201 m) on each side. To the north of downtown is the Utah State Capitol, which sits on Capitol Hill. The LDS Church is involved in the development of several of Salt Lake City's high-rises, including through its commercial real estate arms, such as Property Reserve and City Creek Reserve. When viewed from the west, the city's skyline is framed by the Wasatch Range, a mountain range on the western edge of the greater Rocky Mountains. Another popular view of the skyline is from Ensign Peak, just north of Capitol Hill.

== History ==
Number of buildings by height in Salt Lake City by the end of each year, based on the information in this article. This takes into account the demolished Key Bank Building. Click on the legend to toggle a specific height on or off. View chart definition.

== Cityscape ==
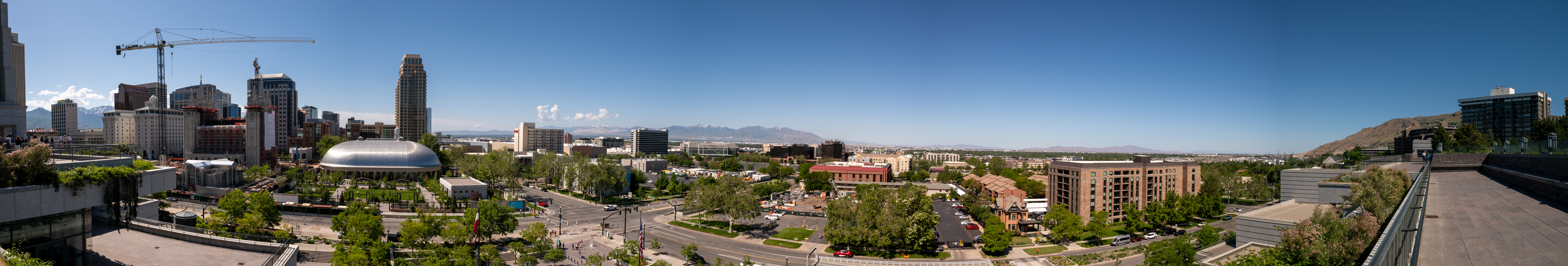
Panorama of Salt Lake City, viewed from the roof of the LDS Conference Center in 2025

== Map of tallest buildings ==
This map shows the location of every building taller than 200 ft (61 m) in Salt Lake City, most of which are located downtown. The exception is the Utah State Capitol, which is on Capitol Hill. Each marker is numbered by the building's height rank, and colored by the decade of its completion.

Buildings taller than 200 ft (61 m) in Salt Lake City.
- 1950s and before
- 1960s
- 1970s
- 1980s
- 1990s
- 2000s
- 2010s
- 2020s
1 Astra Tower
2 Wells Fargo Center
3 Church Office Building
4 95 State at City Creek
5 111 Main
6 99 West on South Temple
7 KeyBank Tower
8 One Utah Center
9 The Worthington
10 Beneficial Financial Group Tower
11 Grand America Hotel
12 Hyatt Regency Salt Lake City
13 American Tower North
14 American Tower South
15 World Trade Center at City Creek
16 222 Main
17 Utah State Capitol
18 South Temple Tower
19 Zions Bank Building
20 The Regent (City Creek)
21 Salt Lake City and County Building
22 Liberty Sky
23 250 Tower
24 Salt Lake Temple
25 Walker Center
26 Hotel Monaco
27 J.C. Penney Building
28 170 S Main
29 Orrin G. Hatch United States Courthouse
30 Ken Garff Tower

== Tallest buildings ==
This list ranks completed buildings in Salt Lake City that stand at least 200 ft (61 m) tall as of 2026, based on standard height measurement. This includes spires and architectural details but does not include antenna masts. The “Year” column indicates the year of completion. Buildings tied in height are sorted by year of completion with earlier buildings ranked first, and then alphabetically.

Was the tallest building in Salt Lake City upon completion

Rank	Name	Image	Location	Height ft (m)	Floors	Year	Purpose	Notes
1	Astra Tower		40°45′56″N 111°53′19″W	449 (136.8)	40	2024	Residential	Tallest building in Salt Lake City and Utah. Tallest building completed in Salt Lake City in the 2020s. Previously the site of a Carl's Jr. The tower encompasses 680,000 square feet, housing 376 rental units and three floors of amenities. The building is LEED Gold Certified.
2	Wells Fargo Center		40°45′48″N 111°53′27″W	422 (128.6)	26	1998	Office	Tallest building in Salt Lake City and Utah from 1998 to 2024. Tallest building completed in Salt Lake City in the 1990s. Tallest office building in Salt Lake City. Originally the American Stores Tower. The height is 400 ft (122 m) at roof level and a total height of 422 ft (129 m). Has two rooftop heliports.
3	Church Office Building		40°46′16″N 111°53′22″W	420 (128)	30	1973	Office	Tallest building in Salt Lake City and Utah from 1973 to 1998. Tallest building completed in Salt Lake City in the 1970s. There is an observation deck on the 26th floor, providing a view of the north side of the Salt Lake Temple.
4	95 State at City Creek		40°46′04″N 111°53′16″W	393 (119.8)	25	2021	Office	The tower houses retail shops, restaurants and a meetinghouse for the Church of Jesus Christ of Latter-Day Saints, as well as 515,000 square of leasable Class A Offices.
5	111 Main		40°46′01″N 111°53′26″W	387 (118)	25	2016	Office	Also known as 111 South Main. Tallest building completed in Salt Lake City in the 2010s. The property, designed by international architecture firm SOM, is directly adjacent to and shares a common lobby with the 2,468 seat Eccles Theater. The theatre was separately designed by Pelli Clarke Pelli Architects, and opened in 2016. Developed by City Creek Reserve, Inc.
6	99 West on South Temple		40°46′08″N 111°53′37″W	377 (114.9)	30	2011	Residential	Topped out in 2009 and completed in 2010. Opened in 2011. 99 West is the tallest residential tower in City Creek Center, and the second tallest residential building in Salt Lake City.
7	KeyBank Tower		40°46′06″N 111°53′20″W	351 (107)	27	1976	Office	Previously named Beneficial Life Tower, renamed when City Creek Center was developed. Not to be confused with Key Bank Building, which was demolished by implosion in 2007.
8	One Utah Center		40°45′52″N 111°53′26″W	350 (106.7)	24	1991	Office	Contains 420,000 square feet of class A office space. Completed at a cost of $102 million.
9	The Worthington		40°45′48″N 111°53′06″W	335 (102.1)	31	2024	Residential	Also known as Convexity Tower. Contains 359 residential units in 26 of the 31 stories, leaving 5,800 square feet (540 m^{2}) of space for ground-floor retail and 359 parking stalls on four stories above ground.
10	Beneficial Financial Group Tower		40°46′08″N 111°53′30″W	335 (102)	20	1998	Office	Originally the Gateway Tower West. Briefly renamed Beneficial Life Tower.
11	Grand America Hotel		40°45′27″N 111°53′25″W	330 (100.6)	24	2001	Hotel	Tallest building completed in Salt Lake City in the 2000s. The main structure, not including the cupola or flagpole, is 249 feet (76 m). The cupola and flagpole brings the hotel to 330 ft (101 m). Tallest all-hotel building in the state.
12	Hyatt Regency Salt Lake City		40°45′56″N 111°53′40″W	327 (99.7)	28	2022	Hotel	A 616,000 square foot (57,200 m^{2}) hotel that is integrated into the adjacent Salt Palace Convention Center. Includes 700 guest rooms.
13	American Tower North		40°45′49″N 111°53′33″W	324 (98.8)	26	1982	Residential	Along with the South Tower, the tallest "twin" buildings in Salt Lake City. They are the joint-tallest buildings completed in Salt Lake City in the 1980s.
14	American Tower South		40°45′47″N 111°53′33″W	324 (98.8)	26	1982	Residential	Along with the North Tower, the tallest "twin" buildings in Salt Lake City. They are the joint-tallest buildings completed in Salt Lake City in the 1980s.
15	World Trade Center at City Creek		40°46′08″N 111°53′21″W	320 (97.5)	22	1986	Office	Originally called the Eagle Gate Plaza and Eagle Gate Tower.
16	222 Main		40°45′52″N 111°53′30″W	315 (96)	22	2009	Office	Also known as 222 South Main. First high-rise building with over 20 stories completed since the Grand America Hotel in 2001. Leased by investment bank Goldman Sachs since 2014.
17	Utah State Capitol		40°46′39″N 111°53′17″W	285 (86.9)	5	1916	Government	Houses two of the three branches of Utah State government after the Supreme Court moved to the Scott M. Matheson Courthouse in 1998. Underwent major renovations between 2004 and 2008 in an effort to protect the building in the event of an earthquake. The building is now expected to withstand a 7.3 magnitude earthquake.
18	South Temple Tower		40°46′08″N 111°53′14″W	274 (83.5)	24	1966	Office	Tallest building in Salt Lake City and Utah besides the state capitol from 1966 to 1973. Tallest building completed in Salt Lake City in the 1960s. Also known as 136 East South Temple. Originally and office tower named the University Club Building. It was converted to residential use in 2025 and rebranded as Seraph.
19	Zions Bank Building		40°46′09″N 111°53′26″W	267 (81.4)	18	1962	Office	Tallest building in Salt Lake City and Utah besides the state capitol from 1962 to 1966. Also known as Gateway Tower East. Originally named the Kennecott Building, the Zion Bank Building was renovated between 2005 and 2006, receiving a post-modern stone and glass façade. Workers removed and recycled over 600,000 pounds of copper that once adorned the Kennecott Building during this renovation process.
20	The Regent (City Creek)		40°46′03″N 111°53′25″W	265 (80.8)	23	2011	Mixed-use	Mixed-use residential and office building.
21	Salt Lake City and County Building		40°45′34″N 111°53′12″W	256 (78)	5	1894	Government	Tallest building in Salt Lake City and Utah from 1894 to 1962. Built by freemasons between 1891 and 1894 to house offices for the city and county of Salt Lake. The walls, made of rough-hewn Kyune sandstone, quarried in Summit County, are faced with brick on the inside and have a width of over five feet, which slowly tapers off with height.
22	Liberty Sky		40°45′57″N 111°53′16″W	250 (76.2)	24	2021	Residential	This design intentionally showcases extensive amounts of exposed concrete. The all-concrete structural framework is a first for a high-rise in Salt Lake City. Includes 278 apartments and five parking decks.
23	250 Tower		40°45′53″N 111°53′03″W	233 (71) (Note: Sources do not state the exact height of this building. This figure was determined using Google Earth by subtracting the altitude of the building's lowest main pedestrian open-air entrance from its highest architectural point.)	16	1984	Office	Formerly known as the CenturyLink Building and the Qwest Building.
24	Salt Lake Temple		40°46′14″N 111°53′31″W	222 (67.7)	4	1893	Religious	The sixth and largest temple of the Church of Jesus Christ of Latter-day Saints. Construction started in 1853 and took 40 years to complete. The 50 moonstones on the buttresses of the temple depict the phases of the moon throughout the year; additional stones include a depiction of the constellation Ursa Major. Tallest building in Salt Lake City briefly from 1893 to 1894. Closed in 2019 for a seismic retrofitting designed to allow it to withstand a magnitude 7.3 earthquake, work on which is expected to be complete in 2026.
25	Walker Center		40°45′55″N 111°53′27″W	220 (67.1)	16	1912	Office	Originally called the Walker Bank Building, it was constructed for the Walker Brothers Bank. The tallest high-rise building in the city when completed in 1912. A 90-foot radio tower was erected in 1947 for use by the KDYL radio and television station, the first television station in Utah. The station moved the television transmitters after a few years, but the tower remained. Letters were hung on each of the four sides to spell out Walker, while Bank was around the perimeter of the top of the building's three-story tower.
26	Hotel Monaco		40°45′53″N 111°53′30″W	214 (65.2)	13	1924	Hotel	Originally called the Continental Bank Building. Its design composition is narrow and vertical and combines a Second Renaissance Revival treatment of the bottom two floors with a strictly utilitarian treatment of the upper floors. The overall design reflects a period of eclecticism during which traditional and modern elements were often joined. Decorative elements include carved stone faces and cartouches, a classical cornice and an original exterior clock.
27	J.C. Penney Building		40°45′45″N 111°53′30″W	209 (63.8)	15	1973	Office	Also known as Zions Bank Broadway Office or its street address, 310 South Main.
28	170 S Main		40°45′56″N 111°53′30″W	209 (63.8)	15	1984	Office	Formerly known as Wells Fargo Plaza, US Bank Tower (or US Bank Plaza), and First Interstate Bank Building.
29	Orrin G. Hatch United States Courthouse		40°45′41″N 111°53′35″W	207 (63)	10	2014	Government	Federal courthouse, housing the United States District Court for the District of Utah. Named after Utah senator Orrin Hatch. Locals have nicknamed it the "Borg Cube" after the Borg, the villainous alien race in Star Trek.
30	Ken Garff Tower		40°45′47″N 111°53′16″W	205 (62)	14	1992	Office	Formerly known as the Broadway Centre until 2017. Headquarters of Ken Garff Auto Group since 2017, who moved from the Ken Garff Building (also in Salt Lake City).

== Tallest under construction or proposed ==
=== Under construction ===
The following table includes buildings under construction in Salt Lake City that are expected to be at least 200 ft (61 m) tall as of 2026, based on standard height measurement. The “Year” column indicates the expected year of completion.

Name	Height ft (m)	Floors	Year	Notes
Soren Tower	278 (85)	28	2029	Located at 370 S. West Temple. This mixed-use community in downtown Salt Lake City will include a 28-story residential high-rise, retail, two floors of shared office space, and a boutique hotel. Located in a qualified Opportunity Zone, the developers claim it will feature best-in-class design, sustainability, amenities, and services and will be positioned as Salt Lake City’s premier mixed-use development. Preparations began in February 2026.

=== Proposed ===
The following table includes approved and proposed buildings in Salt Lake City that are expected to be at least 200 ft (61 m) tall as of 2026, based on standard height measurement. The “Year” column indicates the expected year of completion. A dash “–“ indicates information about the building’s height, floor count, or year of completion is unknown or has not been released.

Name	Height ft (m)	Floors	Year	Notes
Unnamed SLC Sports District Tower Project	600 (183)	N/A	–	If built, it would become the tallest building in Utah. The previous zoning limit for SLC Sports District was 125 feet. In August 2024, the Salt Lake City Council approved a zoning change in August 2024 to allow buildings in the district to be as tall as 600 feet.
Main Street Apartments	392 (119.5)	31	–	The Main Street Apartments is a residential tower planned at 150 S. Main Street. Under a legal agreement with the city, it was supposed to start construction on March 31, 2023, but missed this deadline. The tower will have 400 residential units and 424,856 square feet of space. The roof of the adjacent 5-level parking garage will house Pantages Park, a reference to the Pantages Theater that was demolished before starting construction.
Sundial Tower	344 (105)	23	–	A 23 floor 425,000 sq. ft office tower located at 477 South Main Street. The project is developed by Hines. Architecture firm is Pickard Chilton, which was inspired by Sundial Peak. Also includes a mid-block pedestrian walkway, an 8 floor garage, a 9th floor amenity space, and a 19th floor private patio space overlooking City Hall.

== Tallest demolished ==
There has been one demolished building in Salt Lake City that was taller than 200 ft (61 m).

Name	Image	Height ft (m)	Floors	Year completed	Year demolished	Purpose	Notes
Key Bank Building		270 (82.2)	20	1980	2007	Office	Also known as the Commercial Security Bank Tower. Not to be confused with the KeyBank Tower, previously named the Beneficial Life Tower. Demolished in August 2007 to make way for the City Creek Center.

== Timeline of tallest buildings ==
Name	Image	Height ft (m)	Floors	Years a tallest	Notes
Salt Lake Temple		222 (67.7)	4	1893–1894	
Salt Lake City and County Building		256 (78)	5	1894–1916	
Utah State Capitol		285 (86.9)	5	1916–1973	
Church Office Building		420 (128)	30	1973–1998	
Wells Fargo Center		422 (128.6)	26	1998–2023	
Astra Tower		449 (136.8)	40	2023–present	

== See also ==
- List of tallest buildings in Boise
- List of tallest buildings in Colorado Springs
- List of tallest buildings in Denver
