= Downtown Salt Lake City =

District in Salt Lake City, Utah, US

Coordinates: 40°46′10″N 111°53′28″W

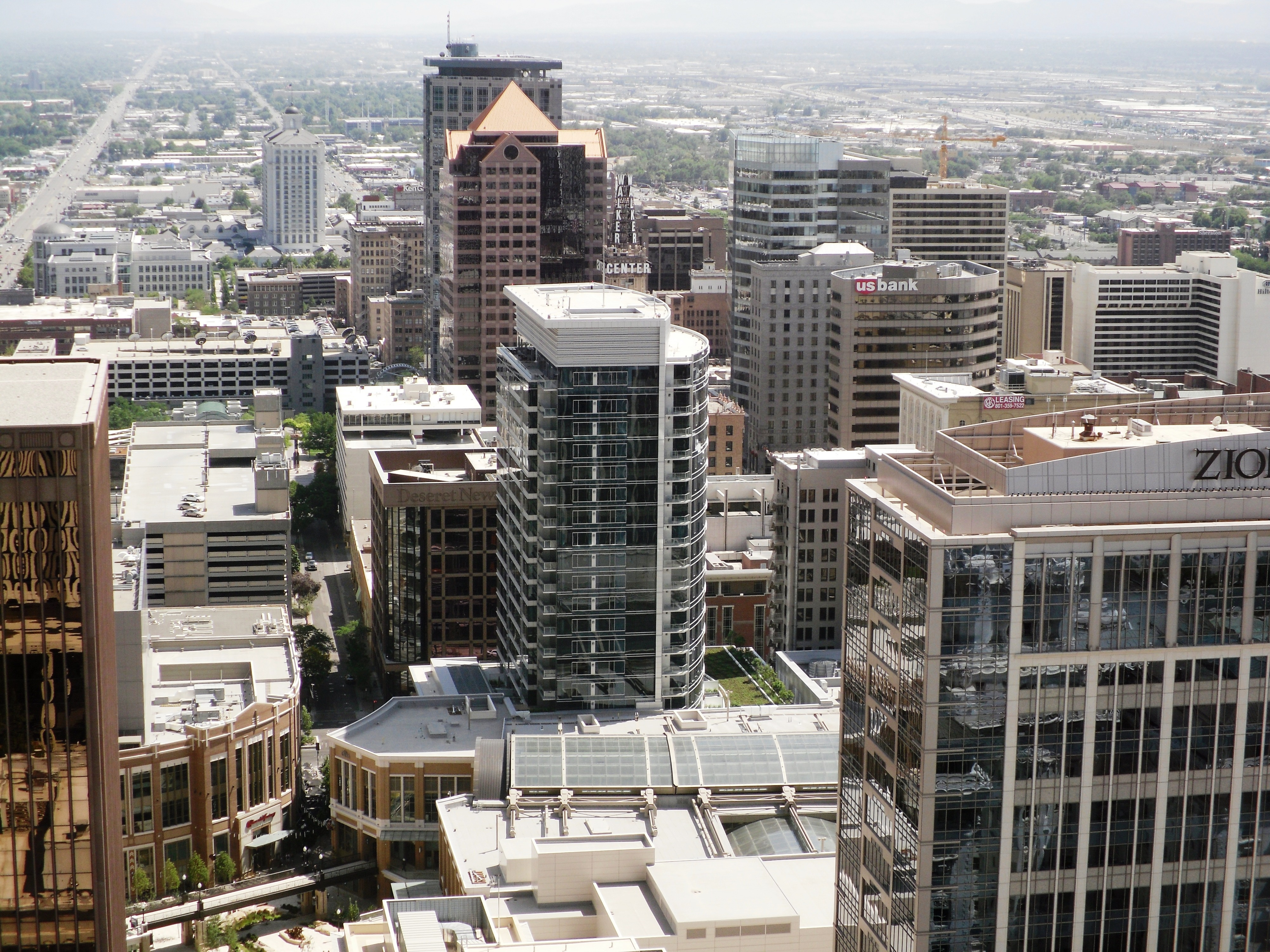
Downtown cityscape in 2012 from the top of the LDS Church Office Building

Downtown (also called City Center) is the oldest district in Salt Lake City, Utah, United States. The grid from which the entire city is laid out originates at Temple Square, the location of the Salt Lake Temple.

== Location ==
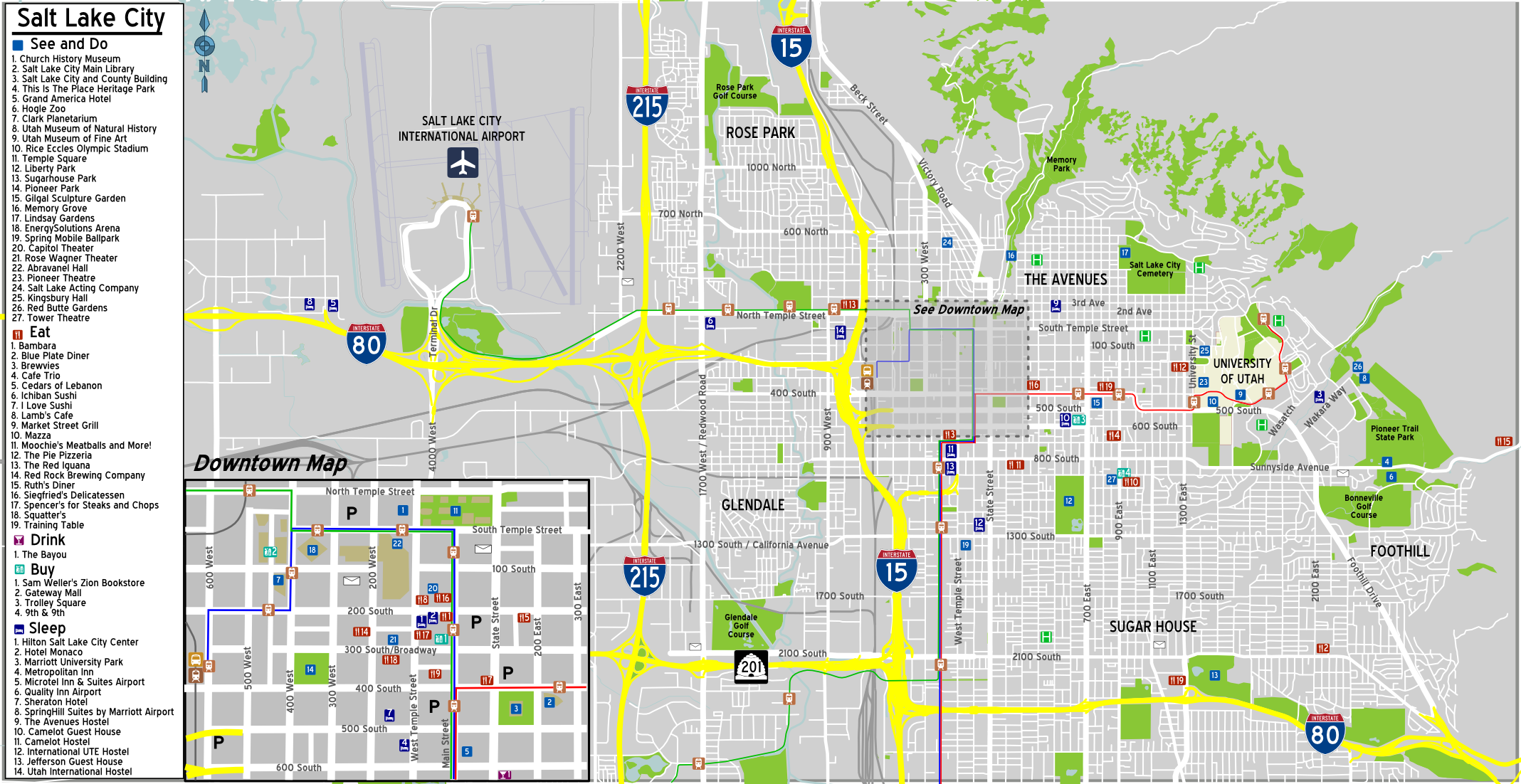
Map of Salt Lake City and Downtown

Downtown Salt Lake City is usually defined as the area approximately between North Temple and 1300 South Streets north to south and about 500 East and 600 West Streets east to west. Downtown encompasses the areas of Temple Square, The Gateway, Main Street, the central business district, South Temple, and others. Along with local and state government and non profits, two primary business organizations - the Salt Lake Chamber and the Downtown Alliance promote Salt Lake CIty's downtown as the heart of the state, and as its most lively and diverse locale.

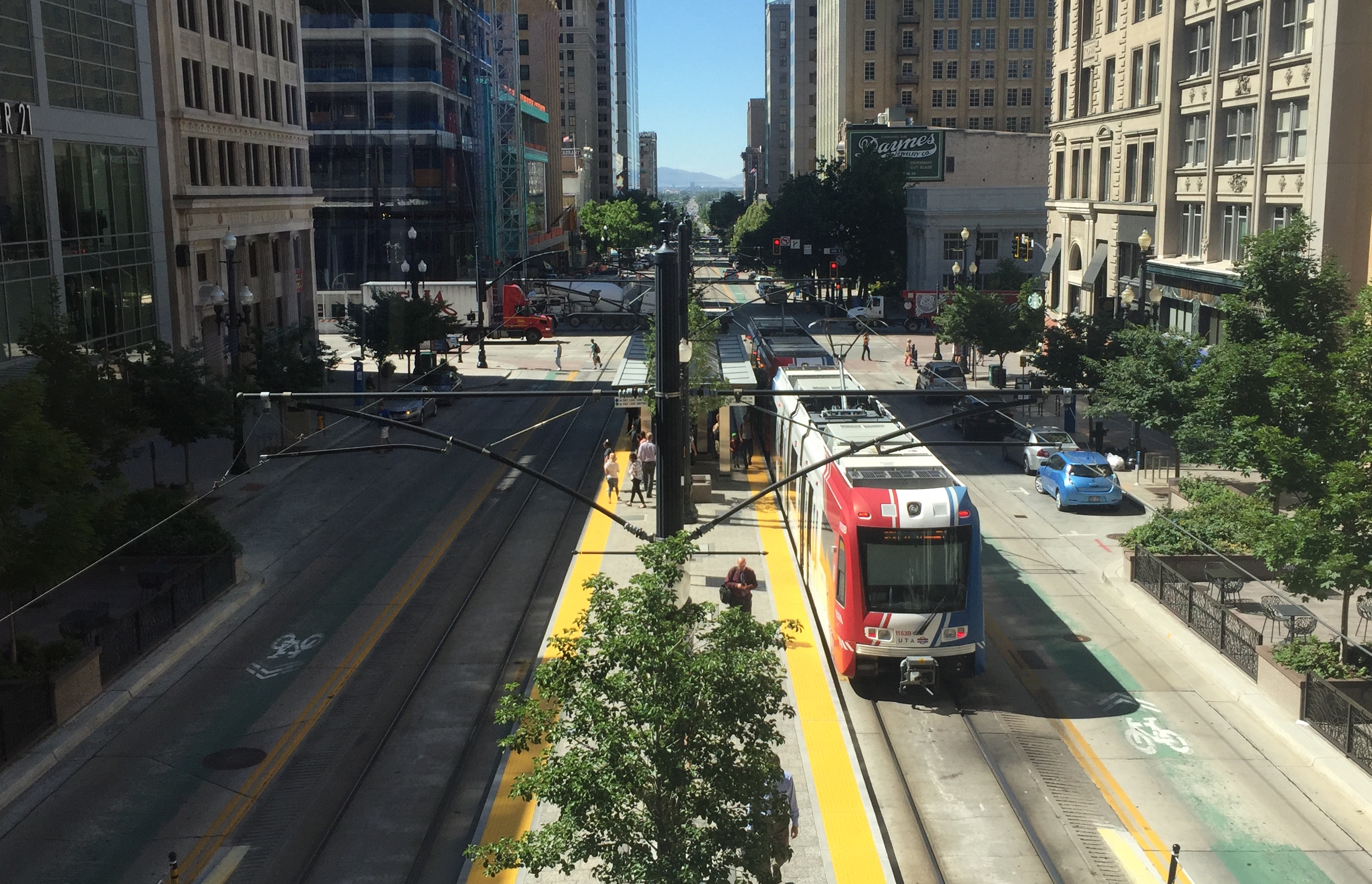
City Center TRAX Station, looking south on Main Street

== History ==
Downtown's layout was first planned in 1833, 17 years before Salt Lake City was founded. Joseph Smith designed the Plat of Zion, a plan for cities of 20,000 people each that followed city blocks with self-sufficient family farms surrounding several temples in the center. Smith meant for this plan to be applied to the City of Zion in the Midwestern United States, but following persecution and Smith's assassination, the plans were carried westward by the Mormon pioneers. Downtown Salt Lake began to form in 1847 when Brigham Young chose the site of the Salt Lake Temple of the Church of Jesus Christ of Latter-day Saints, forming the core of the settlement. Temple Square became the center of the grid system, bounded by South Temple, West Temple, North Temple, and East Temple Streets. Streets are named according to their distance and direction from the southeast corner of Temple Square; for example 200 West is two blocks west of this meridian, while 400 South is four blocks south. East Temple was popularly known as Main Street, and was officially renamed sometime in the late 19th century. It remains as the commercial and economic center of the city today.

=== Main Street ===
The early Mormon pioneers, who originally settled in Salt Lake City, adopted a form of consecration whereby crops grown and products produced were divided among members of the Church of Jesus Christ of Latter-day Saints (LDS Church) in local congregations. This enabled new settlers to have the food and products they needed after they made the rigorous journey to Salt Lake City. This exchange was eventually organized into what would become Zions Cooperative Mercantile Institution (ZCMI).

The first businesses to locate on Main Street were those founded by James A. Livingston and Charles A. Kincade, in 1850, in the area south of the Council House that was being built on the corner of Main and South Temple Streets. The Mormon pioneers lived a very secluded existence in the remote Salt Lake Valley for the first 20 years of settlement, beginning construction of the Salt Lake Temple and other monuments like the Salt Lake Theatre. However, in 1865 U.S. troops stationed in Park City discovered silver and announced it to the world.

With this announcement, an entirely new element began streaming into Salt Lake City. Prospectors completely changed the downtown district. In accommodation of the new crowd, many of the Main Street businesses were saloons, earning the street the nickname "Whiskey Street".

For many years, there existed a political and cultural divide in Salt Lake City. Mormons would mostly shop and congregate around the Salt Lake Temple, the Gardens at Temple Square and ZCMI on the north-end of Main Street, and those who were not members of the church, who were mostly prospectors in the early days, would stay south of the predominantly Mormon area. This divide still can be felt to the present day, particularly on weekend evenings when the businesses on the north side of downtown close their doors early while the bars and restaurants on the south end of downtown host crowds late into the night.

Originally, the business district extended along the west side of Main between South Temple and 100 South. By the 1880s, the area had expanded to both sides of the street and down to 200 South, and increased about a block a decade, until 1900, when it reached 400 South. Today, the southern limit of downtown Salt Lake City is usually considered to be 900 South.

=== Commercial Street ===
From 1870 to the 1930s, Commercial Street (Now known as "Regent Street") was Salt Lake's notorious red light district. Prostitution was begrudgingly tolerated as long as it was confined to Commercial Street. But prostitution continued beyond Commercial Street in brothels in other areas as well such as Plum Alley, which was Salt Lake City's China Town. In the late 1880s, the trade was unofficially licensed. Police would "arrest" all of the prostitutes and their madams each month and "fine" them $50 each. After a physical examination, they would be released and allowed to ply their trade without any further fear of molestation. Many notable Salt Lakers owned buildings on Commercial Street, including the Brigham Young Trust Company, whose board included many prominent members of the Church of Jesus Christ of Latter-day Saints (LDS Church). Brigham Young, Jr., then a church Apostle and vice president of the bank, temporarily resigned over the matter, until the building was later sold.

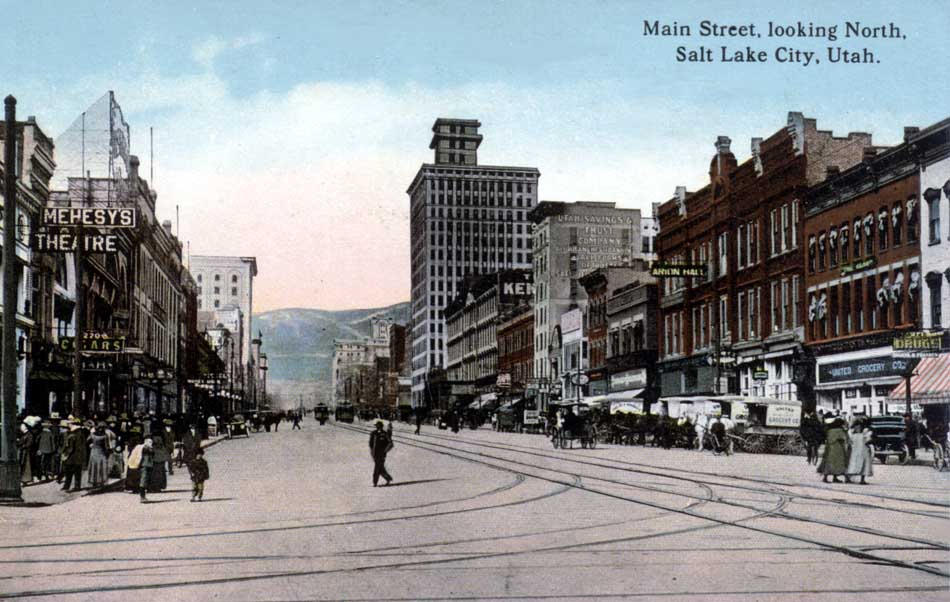
Main Street, Salt Lake City in the early 20th Century

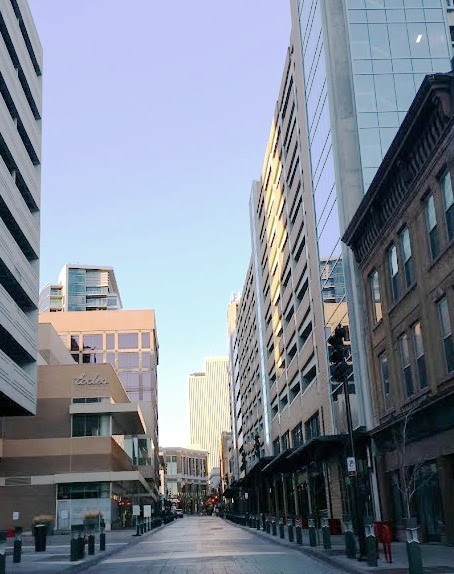
Regent Street, formerly known as Commercial Street, has been recently revitalized with the construction of the City Creek Center and the Eccles Theatre

=== 20th century ===
Salt Lake City boomed in the years before World War I and the center of mass of downtown was pulled southward by the efforts of Samuel Newhouse and other non-LDS community members. The Exchange Place Historic District encompasses the surviving structures from this era. In 1912, at the intersection of Main Street and 200 South, police officer Lester Wire installed his homemade electric traffic light, the first of its kind in the world. Salt Lake had an extensive streetcar network at the time and Trolley Square served as its main depot for years before the gradual removal of the system that came with the rise of the automobile. Though the trolley system itself is now long gone, Trolley Square remains as a noteworthy example of adaptive reuse and houses a museum dedicated to the history of the city's streetcars.

After World War II, many people could afford to move out of downtown into the suburbs. By 1971, 60% of the homes in downtown Salt Lake City were in major disrepair. Starting in the 1960s, revitalization efforts began, spearheaded by the LDS Church, which had always considered downtown its home. During the '70s, the Church built the ZCMI Center Mall on a full city block of land that had previously housed the ZCMI department store, preserving the historic storefront. The Church also leased land to a developer to build Crossroads Plaza Mall. The land for the mall originally housed the Amussen Jewelry building (1869), at the time Salt Lake City's oldest building. A study commissioned by the city found it to be Salt Lake City's most architecturally significant building, and efforts to preserve it were underway. However, before the building could be saved, it was torn down to make way for the mall. Many historic buildings were lost to urban renewal during this era, the most notable of which was the Dooly Building, built in 1892 and designed by Louis Sullivan. The LDS Church Office Building was completed in 1973 and became Salt Lake's tallest building at 28 floors and 420 ft tall. Contrary to a popular local legend, there is no formal restriction that prevents buildings from being built taller than the Church Office Building.

From 1970 to 1976, the Central Main Street shopping district saw a dramatic shift from the South-end (near Exchange Place and Broadway) to the North-end (near the L.D.S Temple). This shift was the result of a change in buying patterns, with shoppers preferring malls rather than on-street department stores. Using land and a loan provided by Zion Securities, the second Main Street mall was completed in 1978. Following the completion of the Crossroads Mall, the south-end of Main Street collapsed, beginning with 117-year-old merchant Auerbachs Department Store. Others to go under were Broadway Music, Paris Company, Baker Shoes, Pembroke's, Keith O'Brien and Keith Warshaw.

In the 1980s, a Saudi businessman, Adnan Khashoggi, had a vision of turning Salt Lake City into a major business hub. Forming a U.S. holdings company, "Triad Utah", he planned to build two 43-story skyscrapers, as well as several mid-rise buildings at the Triad Center. Khashoggi was implicated in the Iran-Contra scandal and his assets were frozen by the Federal government and the skyscrapers were never built, leaving the current Triad Center with only buildings 3, 4 and 5. Revitalization efforts of downtown continued through the 1980s and 1990s, with noteworthy projects that included the demolition of the Hotel Newhouse in 1983 and the redevelopment of Block 57 into the Gallivan Center and One Utah Center in 1991–1992. In 1985, the Radisson Hotel Salt Lake City Downtown was completed.

The Salt Palace arena, home of the Utah Jazz, was torn down and a new arena, the Delta Center (Vivint Arena), was constructed to the northwest in 1991 with the leadership of Larry H. Miller. The existing convention center connected to the arena was also demolished and a new convention center of the same name was built on the site. In 1998, the American Stores Tower (Wells Fargo Center) was completed and remained the tallest building in Salt Lake City by two feet until the Astra Tower was topped out in 2024. The LDS Church Office Building appears taller from a distance because it stands on higher ground. In 2000, the LDS Conference Center was completed and supplanted the still-existing Salt Lake Tabernacle for conferences of the Church of Jesus Christ of Latter-day Saints.

=== 21st century ===
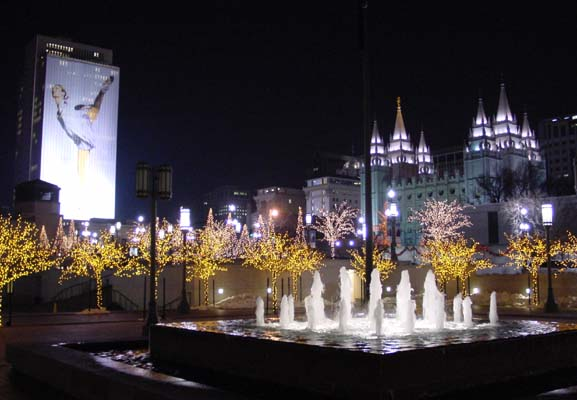
Temple Square during the 2002 Olympics. The LDS Church Office Building, along with other highrises, were decorated with large banners depicting Olympic athletes.

Downtown took center stage in the 2002 Winter Olympics, hosted by Salt Lake City, and there were efforts to beautify the city and improve transit options for visitors. The Gateway, a large outdoor, pedestrian-oriented mall, was built around the historic Union Pacific Depot and hosts the Salt Lake Olympic Plaza. The TRAX light rail system was built in the years leading up to the Olympics and directly connects downtown to the University of Utah, Salt Lake International Airport, and many of the suburbs including South Salt Lake, West Valley City, Murray, and Draper.

In 2004, Ensign College, formerly known as LDS Business College, and the BYU Salt Lake Center moved downtown to the Triad Center, which was purchased by the LDS Church.

The construction of the $1.5 billion mixed-use City Creek Center from 2006 to 2012, which covers 20 acres (81,000 m^{2}) across three city blocks, marked a significant step toward bringing business interest and pedestrian activity back to downtown. The development included nearly 725,000 sq ft (67,400 m^{2}) of retail space, new and refurbished office towers, new residential buildings, and a full-service grocery store.

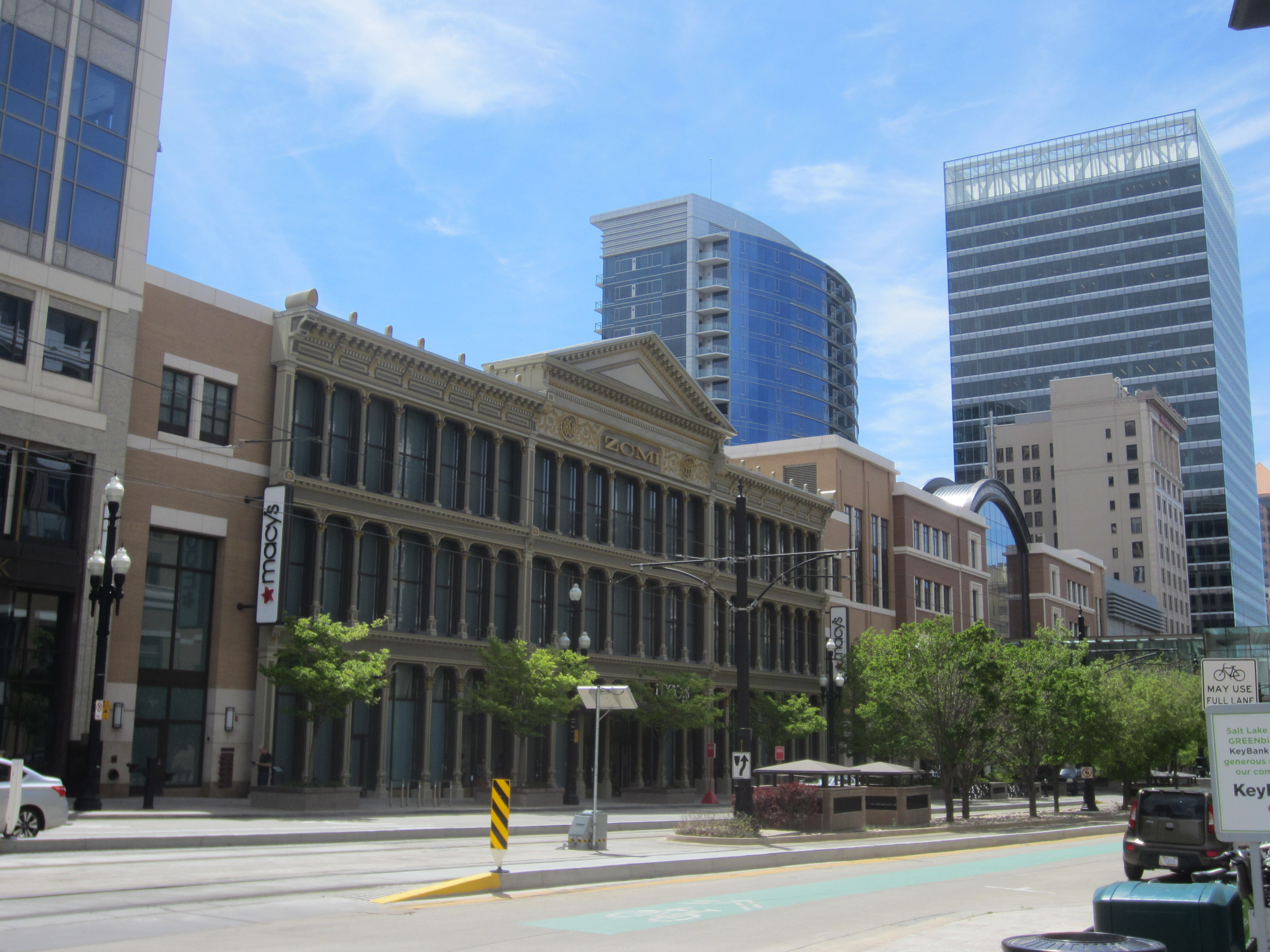
City Creek Center from Main Street in 2021, showing the reuse of the historic ZCMI facade.

In 2016, a new Broadway-style theatre, the 2,468-seat Eccles Theatre, and a connected 24-story office building, 111 Main, were completed one block south. Downtown is now seeing an "unprecedented" level of real estate development, with multiple large towers under construction despite the COVID-19 pandemic, and has more than 5,000 residential units either planned or under construction as of April 2021. This included the Astra Tower, which when completed in 2025, became the new tallest building in Utah, standing at 39-stories tall.

== Crime ==
Pioneer Park, on the western edge of downtown, developed a reputation as one of the most crime-ridden areas of the state, and as having a large number of drug dealers. During a six-day crackdown in early November, 2007, 658 people were arrested in and around the park, approximately 70% of all arrests made in the city during that time period in an area that takes up just 1% of Salt Lake City. Pioneer Park was completely renovated in early 2008 following several severe assault incidents. After the controversial Operation Rio Grande, which began in 2017, and the closure and demolition of the Road Home homeless shelter in 2019 and 2020, respectively, the Pioneer Park area has begun to see a dramatic reduction in crime and a resulting trend of gentrification.
