= 222 Main =

Skyscraper in Salt Lake City

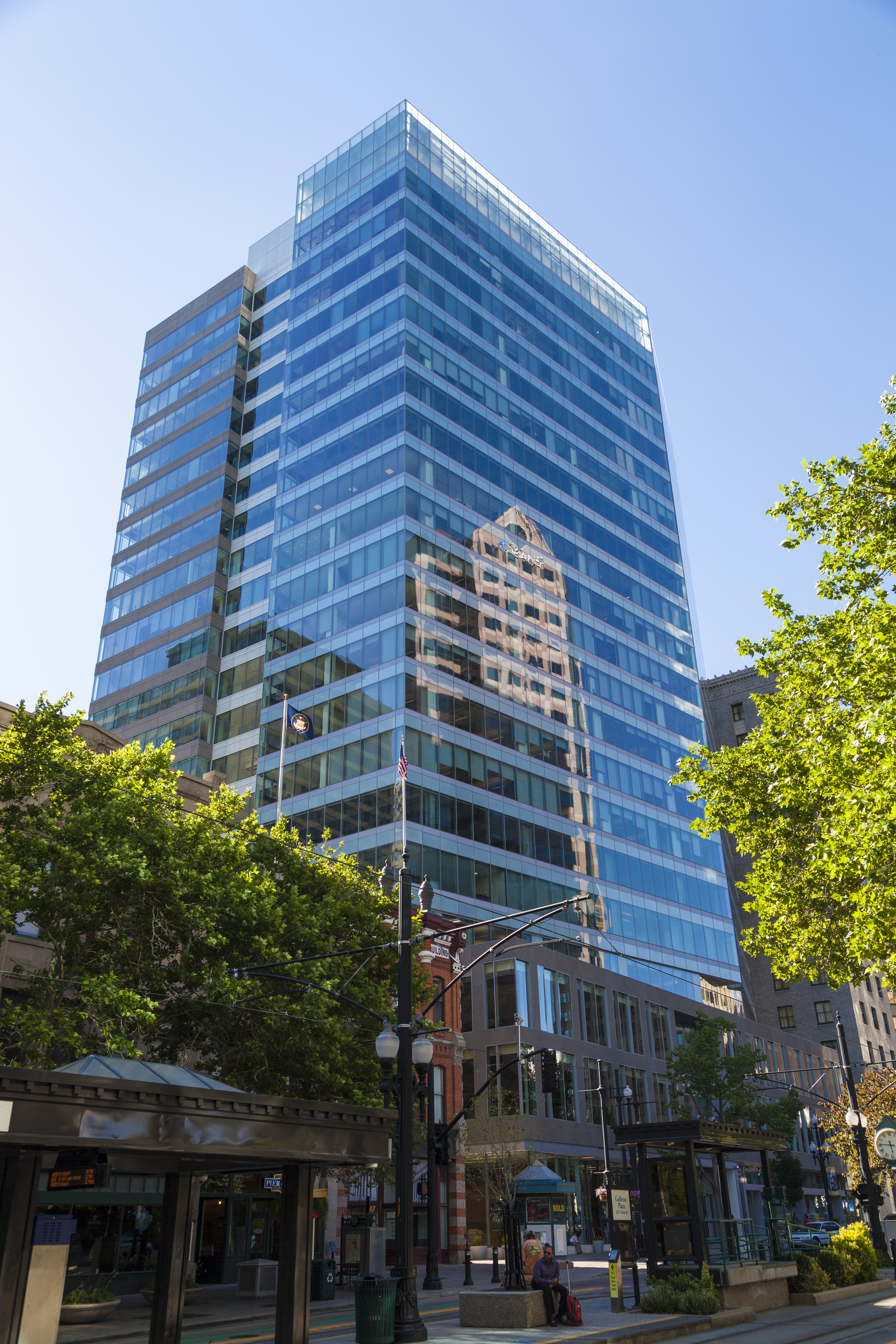
- 222 Main, July 2013
- Interactive map of the 222 Main area
- Alternative names: Hamilton Partners Tower
- Etymology: Building's street address

General information
- Status: Completed
- Type: high-rise office building
- Location: 222 South Main Street; Salt Lake City, Utah 84111; United States
- Coordinates: 40°45′51″N 111°53′28″W
- Construction started: 2008
- Completed: December 2009
- Cost: $125 million
- Owner: PRIME US-222 MAIN, LLC
- Operator: Lincoln Property Company

Height
- Antenna spire: 316 ft (96 m)
- Roof: 307 ft (94 m)

Technical details
- Floor count: 24
- Floor area: 459,000 square feet (42,600 m^{2})
- Lifts/elevators: 10

Design and construction
- Architect: Skidmore, Owings & Merrill
- Developer: Hamilton Partners Inc.
- Main contractor: Oakland Construction

Other information
- Parking: 852 spaces (paid)

Website
- 222main.info

222 Main is a high-rise office building in Salt Lake City, Utah, United States, that was Utah's first LEED Gold-certified high-rise.

== Description ==
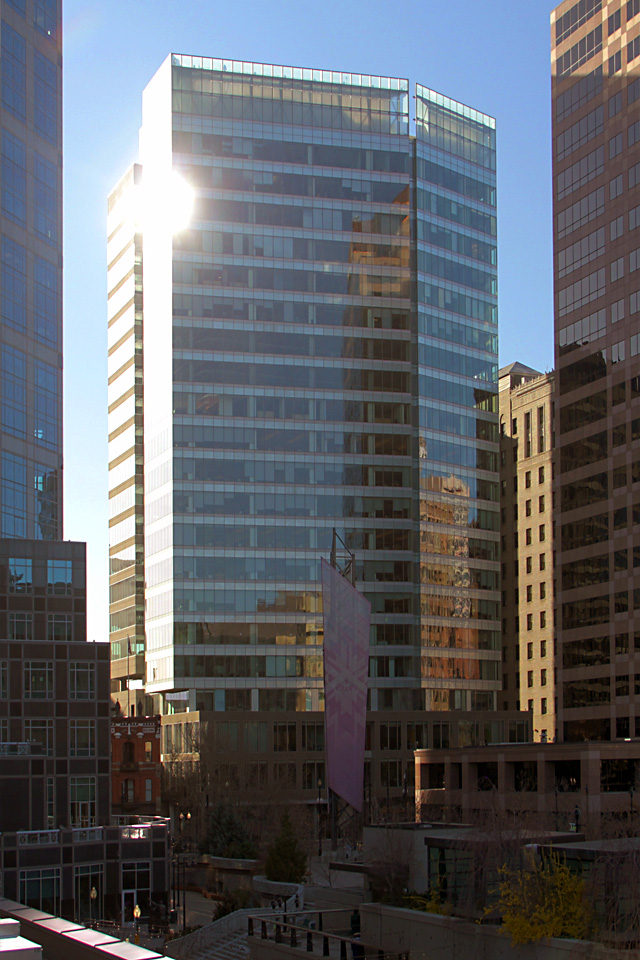
222 Main, July 2014

The structure stands 22 stories high and is located at 222 South Main Street in the Central City neighborhood. The shape of the building is designed to optimize views between currently standing buildings, includes a parking garage hidden behind the main structure and has 459,000 square feet (42,600 m^{2}) of office space with floor to ceiling windows. There are a total of 6,257 pieces of structural steel and bracing in the structure and wiring that stretches 201 miles (323 km). Atop the building is a 20-foot (6.1 m) glass veil that is illuminated with different colors at various times of the year.

The building cost $125 million (equivalent to $187.59 million in 2025) and took nearly two years to complete.

=== LEED Certification ===
Originally, the building was expected to earn LEED Silver certification, but along the way improvements were made and the building ultimately earned LEED Gold certification.

=== Architect ===
The building was designed by architectural firm Skidmore, Owings & Merrill LLP (SOM). SOM has also designed buildings such as the Willis Tower in Chicago, the Burj Khalifa in the United Arab Emirates (the world's current tallest building), and the Air Force Academy Chapel in Colorado Springs, Colorado. SOM also designed the One World Trade Center, which was built near where the destroyed World Trade Center once stood.

== History ==
Construction on the building was completed in December 2009. The building was facing serious occupancy issues, with the pre-lease rate remaining at around 25% but rates subsequently increased, especially with the largely publicized lease announcement of Goldman Sachs. The building eventually became fully occupied.

In February 2014, the property's original owners (and current building manager), Hamilton Partners, sold the building to KBS Real Estate Investment Trust III (KBS) for $170.5 million (equivalent to $231.88 million in 2025) in "a record-setting deal for commercial real estate in Utah's capital city, on a cost per-square footage basis." At the time of purchase, KBS already owned the Parkside Tower and Gateway Tech Center in Salt Lake City.

== See also ==
- Buildings and sites of Salt Lake City, Utah
- List of tallest buildings in Salt Lake City
- Leadership in Energy and Environmental Design
