= Wells Fargo Center (Salt Lake City) =

Office building in Salt Lake City, Utah, U.S.

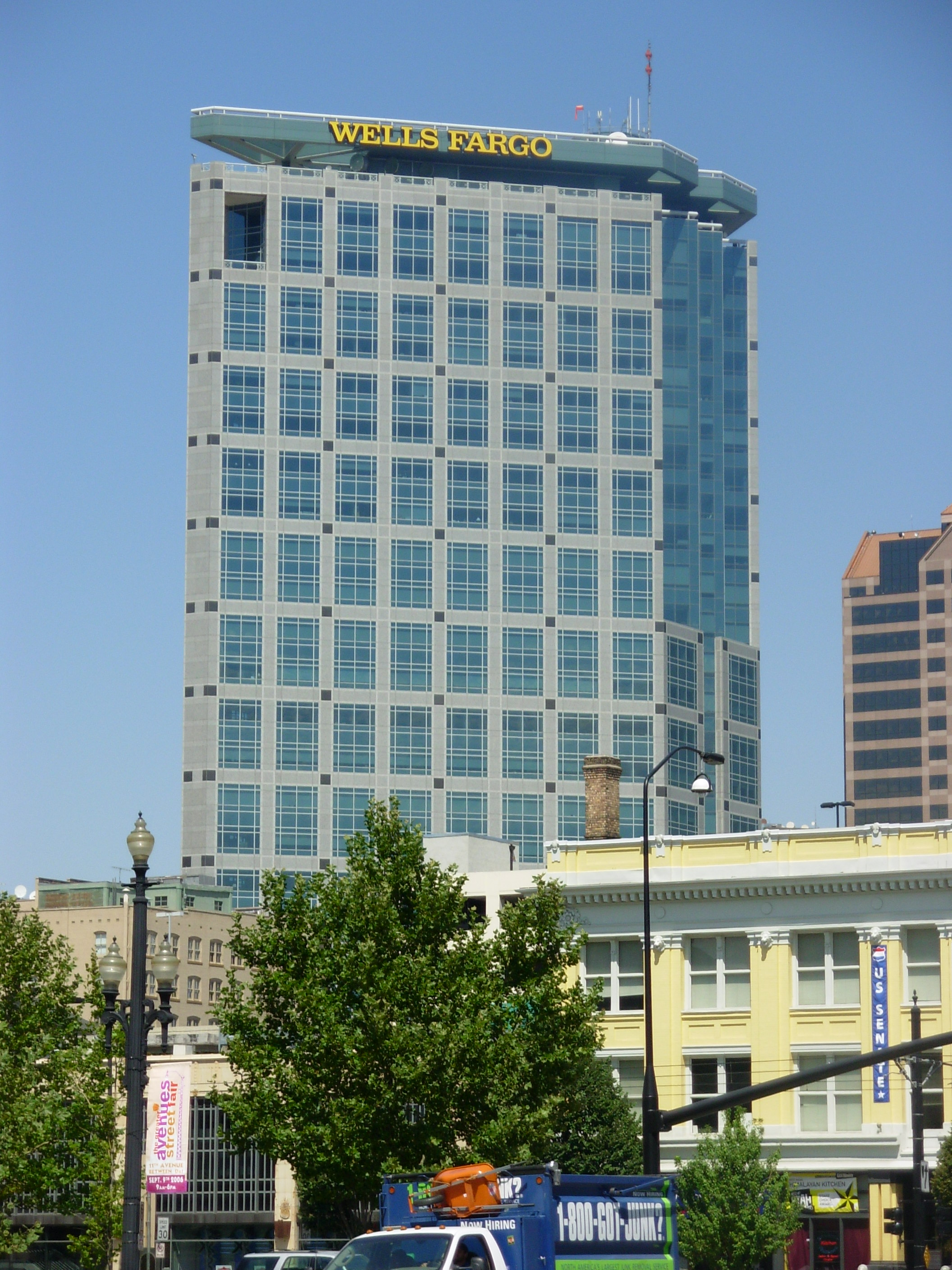
- Wells Fargo Center, August 2006
- Interactive map of the Wells Fargo Center area
- Alternative names: American Stores Center

General information
- Type: Commercial offices
- Location: Salt Lake City, Utah
- Coordinates: 40.7634°N 111.8907°W
- Construction started: 1996
- Completed: 1998

Height
- Architectural: 422 ft (129 m)
- Roof: 400 ft (120 m)

Technical details
- Floor count: 24; 1 below ground
- Floor area: 569,992 sq ft (52,954.0 m^{2})
- Lifts/elevators: 13

Design and construction
- Architect: HKS, Inc.
- Structural engineer: HKS, Inc.
- Main contractor: Howa Construction, Inc.

Website
- www.wellsfargo.com/locator/bank/299__S__MAIN__ST__1ST__FL__BANK_SALT__LAKE__CITY_UT_84111/

Wells Fargo Center is a skyscraper located in Downtown, Salt Lake City, Utah, United States. It was built in 1998 and was the tallest skyscraper in Utah until 2024 when the 449-foot (137 m) Astra Tower was completed. It stands 24 stories above street level and 400 ft (120 m) at roof level, 422 ft (129 m) at its highest point excluding the antenna.

== History ==
The American Stores Tower was originally built as the corporate headquarters for American Stores (owners of Sav-on, Osco, Jewel grocery/pharmacy stores.) Shortly after completion, the company was acquired by Albertsons on August 3, 1998, and the building became known as the Delta Tower shortly thereafter. When Albertsons decided to move operations to the Hardware Building on 400 West near North Temple, the building was purchased by Wasatch Property Management, and renamed the building Wells Fargo Center. The building was the headquarters of the Salt Lake Organizing Committee (SLOC) leading up to the 2002 Winter Olympics. Wells Fargo currently occupies numerous floors within the building.

== Details ==
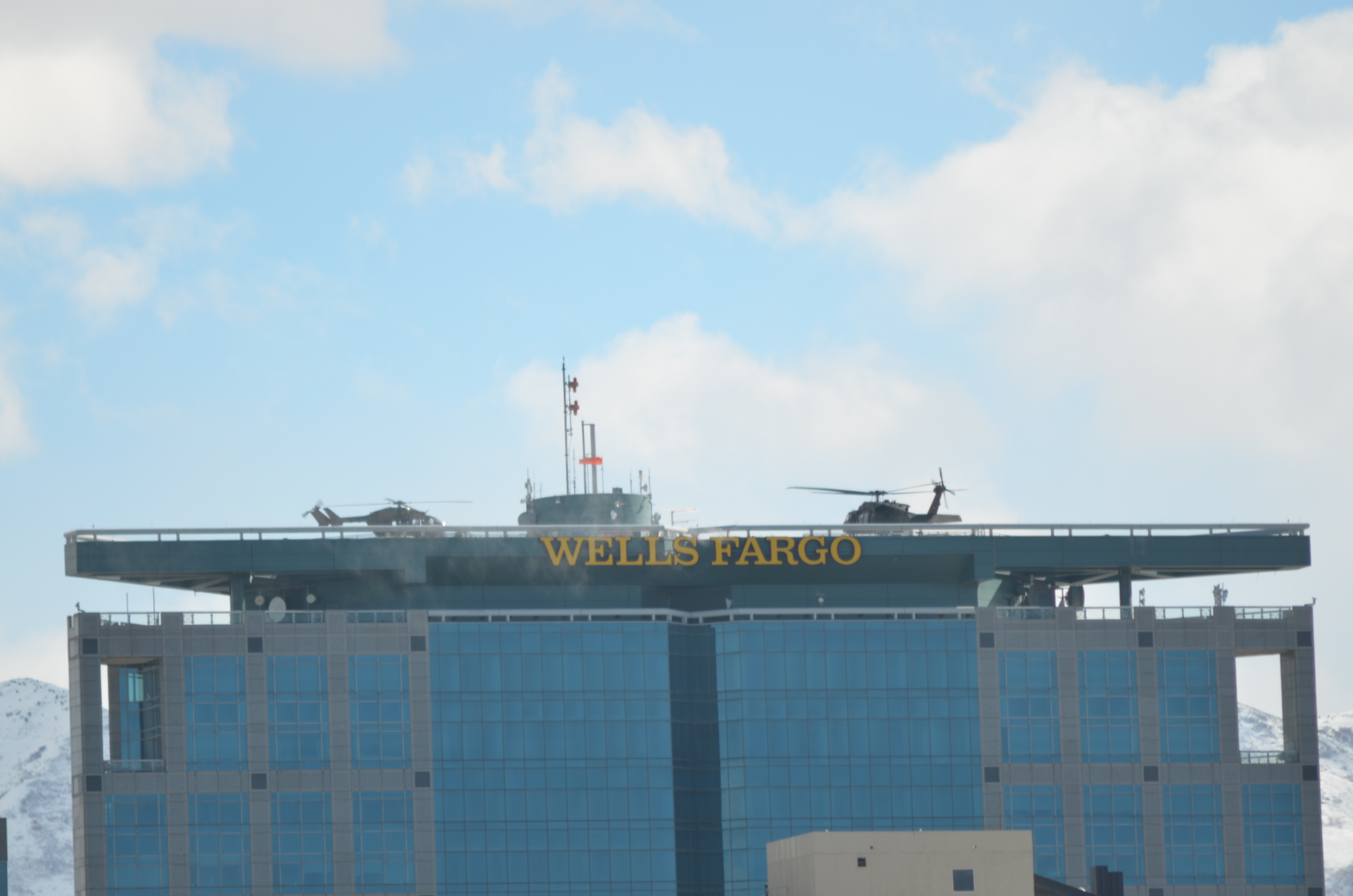
Two National Guard helicopters utilize the UT31 American Stores Heliport on 10 February 2019

- Architect – HKS Architects
- It has 13 elevators
- Building use – office, commercial
- Structural type – highrise
- Architectural style – postmodern
- Materials – glass and Cold Springs salt and pepper granite
- Two helipads on the roof make the American Stores Heliport (UT31)
- KUTV is housed in the building

== See also ==
- List of tallest buildings by U.S. state
- List of tallest buildings in Salt Lake City

Preceded by LDS Church Office Building	Tallest building in Salt Lake City; 1998–2024; 129 m	Succeeded by Astra Tower
