= Timpanogos Cooperative Marketing Association Building =

- U.S. National Register of Historic Places
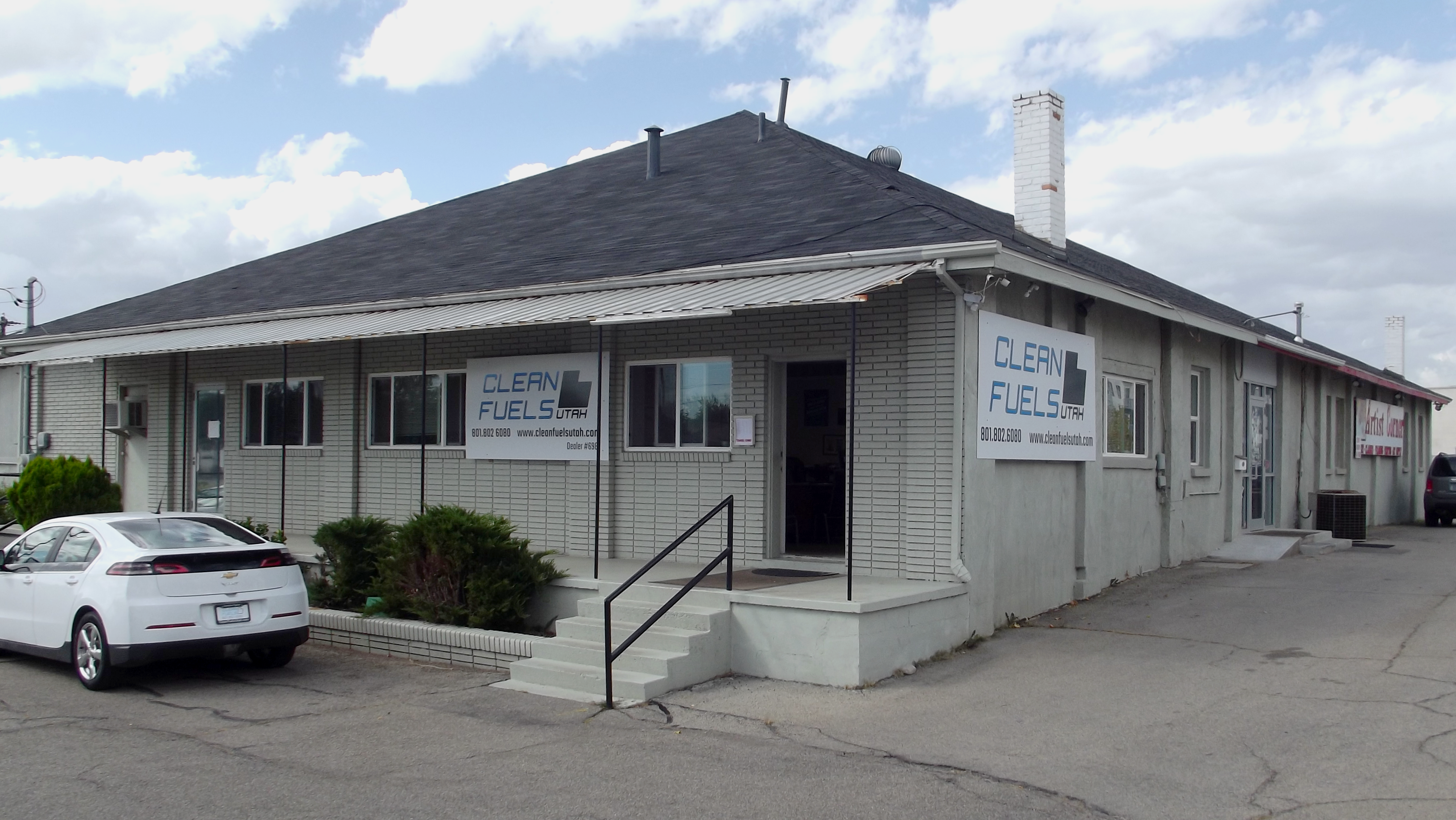

- Location within Utah Location within the United States
- Location: 380 S. Orem Blvd., Orem, Utah
- Coordinates: 40°17′25″N 111°41′40″W
- Area: 1 acre (0.40 ha)
- Built: 1926
- Architectural style: Prairie School
- MPS: Orem, Utah MPS
- NRHP reference No.: 08000385
- Added to NRHP: May 7, 2008

The Timpanogos Cooperative Marketing Association Building, also known as Snow Station and as Orem Railroad Depot and Packing Sheds, is located at 380 S. Orem Blvd. in Orem, Utah. It was built in 1926 and includes Prairie School architecture.

It was listed on the National Register of Historic Places in 2008.

The Salt Lake and Utah Railroad, an electric railroad from Salt Lake to Provo, known as the "Orem Line", opened in 1913, and was important in the economic development of Orem.
