= Astra Tower (Salt Lake City) =

Residential skyscraper in Utah

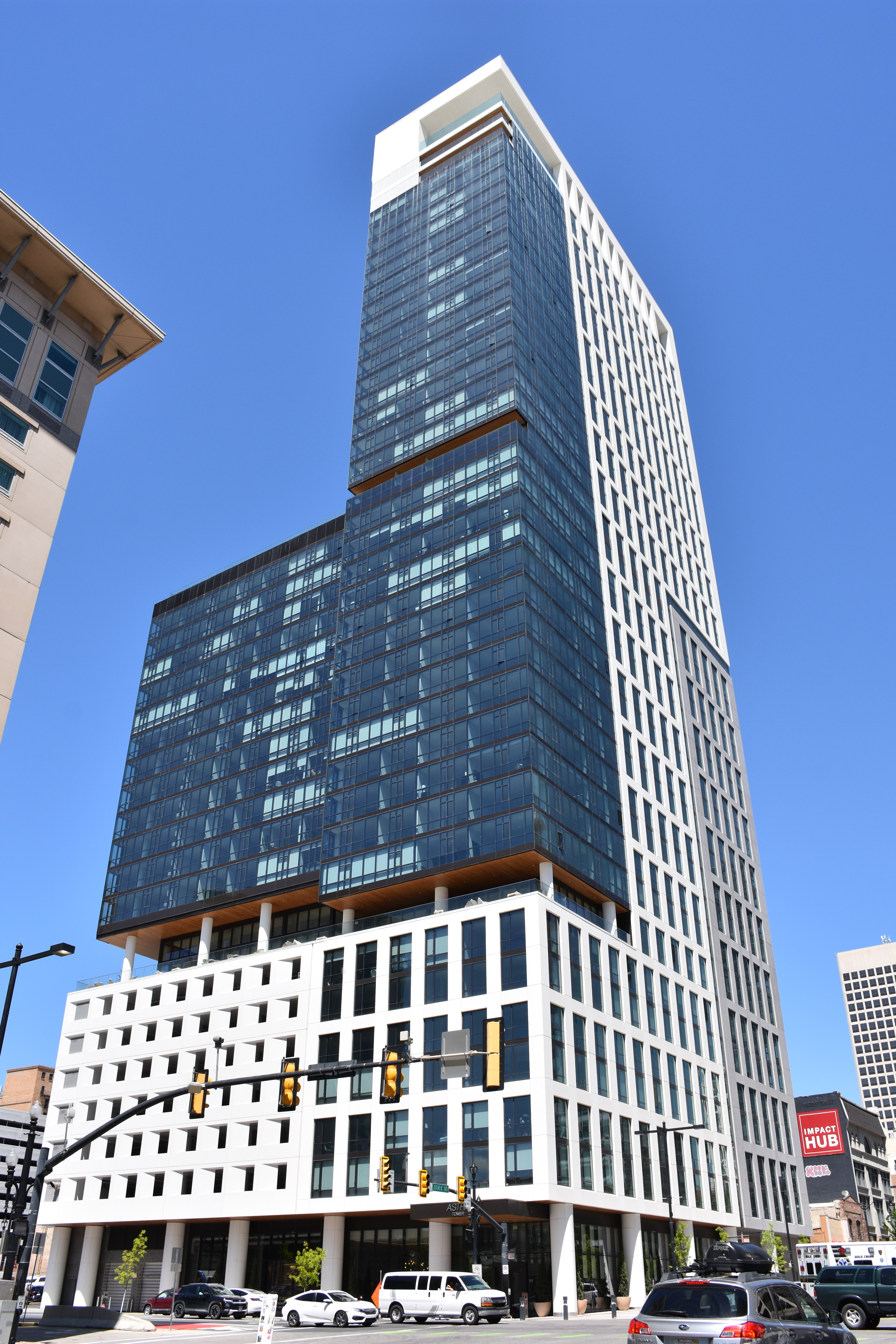
- Astra Tower in August 2025
- Alternative names: 200 South State Street; Kensington Tower

General information
- Type: Residential
- Location: 89 East 200 South; Salt Lake City, Utah
- Coordinates: 40.7653°N 111.8887°W
- Construction started: 2021
- Completed: 2024
- Opening: May 13, 2025; 16 months ago

Height
- Roof: 449 ft (137 m)

Technical details
- Floor count: 40
- Floor area: 680,000 sq ft (63,000 m^{2})

Design and construction
- Architect: HKS, Inc.
- Structural engineer: Thornton Tomasetti
- Main contractor: Jacobsen Construction Company

Website
- astraslc.com

Astra Tower, known during construction as Kensington Tower, is a high-rise residential skyscraper in Downtown Salt Lake City, Utah, United States. Rising to 41 stories and 449 feet (137 m) in height, it is the tallest building in both the city and state.

== History and construction ==
The site of the Astra Tower, a 0.7-acre (0.28 ha) lot located at the corner of 200 South and State Street, was previously occupied by a Carl's Jr. restaurant. Development of the tower was led by the Kensington Investment Company (KIC), which estimated the total cost for the project at $260.4 million.

Official groundbreaking occurred in January 2022, with the construction contract being awarded to Salt Lake City-based Jacobsen Construction Company. The building reached full structural height in 2024, surpassing the nearby Wells Fargo Center by over 35 feet (11 m) to become the tallest building in Utah.

Construction of the apartment building was completed in early 2025, and a formal ribbon-cutting ceremony was held on May 13, 2025, to celebrate the building’s opening.

== Design ==
The Astra Tower is designed and built to LEED environmental standards, and is certified as LEED Gold BD+C. The building was constructed with regional environmental issues in mind; using approximately 14 million U.S. gallons (53 million liters) of potable water per year, about 35% less than expected usage of skyscrapers of similar size.

=== Air Quality Beacon ===
A prominent feature of the Astra Tower's facade is its integrated LED "crown," which functions as a real-time air quality beacon for the Salt Lake Valley. The lighting system is synced with data from the National Oceanic and Atmospheric Administration and the United States Environmental Protection Agency, alongside using data collected by sensors at the top of the building, to provide a visual representation of the current air quality in the area.

== See also ==
- List of tallest buildings in Salt Lake City

| Preceded by Wells Fargo Center | Tallest building in Salt Lake City; 2024–present 137 m | Succeeded by none |
