= Salt Lake and Utah Railroad =

Electric railroad

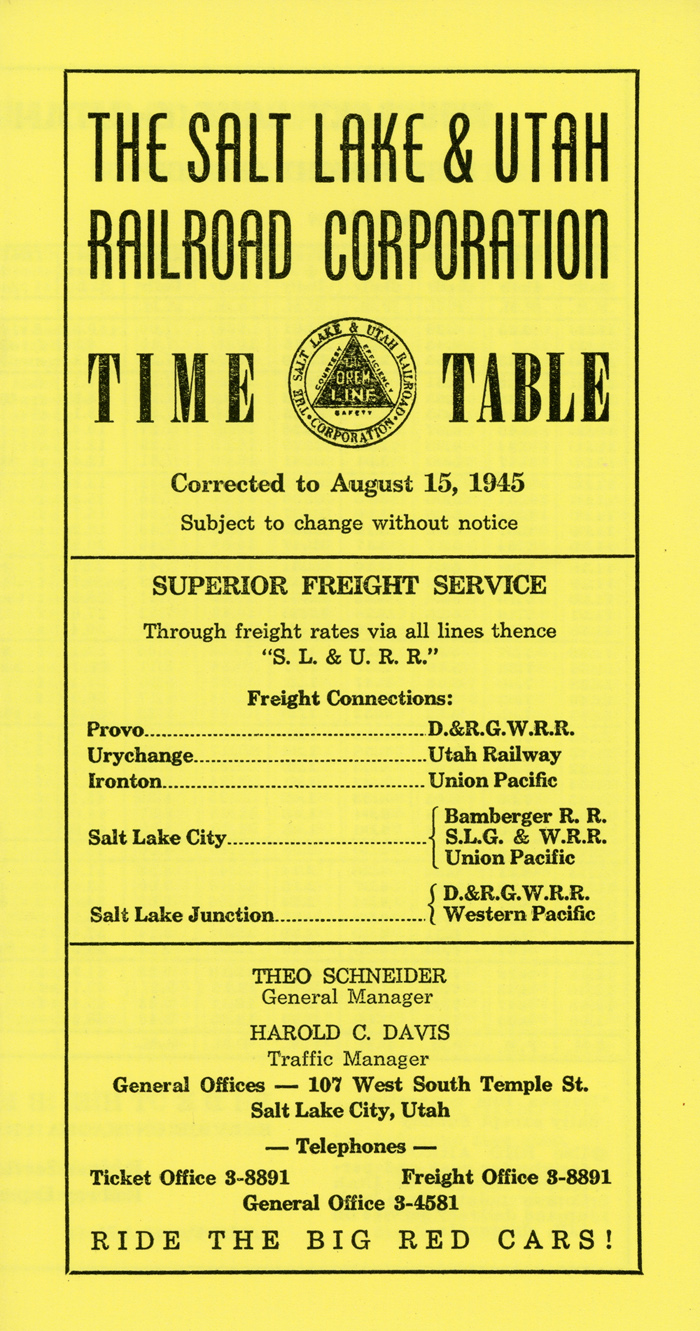
- The Salt Lake and Utah Railroad's timetable 45

Overview
- Status: Ceased operation
- Owner: A. J. Orem & Company
- Locale: Salt Lake County, Utah; Utah County, Utah
- Termini: Salt Lake City, Utah; Payson, Utah
- Stations: 57

Service
- Type: Interurban
- Services: 2

History
- Opened: March 23, 1913 (to American Fork, Utah)
- Last extension: May 26, 1916 (to Payson)
- Closed: 1946

Technical
- Line length: 66.6 miles (107.2 km)
- Electrification: 1500V (AC) overhead catenary

The Salt Lake and Utah Railroad, also known as the Orem Line or Orem Interurban, was an electric railroad which operated between downtown Salt Lake City and Payson, Utah, United States. Construction of the main line was started in 1913 with financing provided by A. J. Orem & Company, with Walter C. Orem as president. The railroad opened in 1914 with stops in both Utah and Salt Lake counties. The railroad also operated a branch line which ran to Magna. Both passenger and freight service was offered. The line's terminus in downtown Salt Lake City was shared with the Bamberger Railroad, and was located at the current site of Abravanel Hall. The railroad stopped service in 1946.

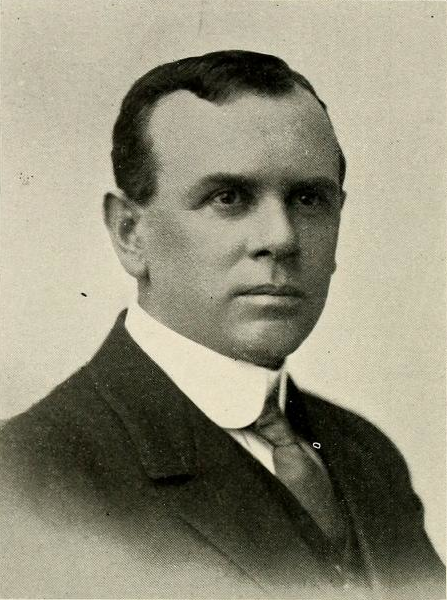
Walter C. Orem, founding president of the Salt Lake & Utah railroad

== See also ==
- Timpanogos Cooperative Marketing Association Building – Former depot
