= Church Office Building =

Skyscraper in Salt Lake City, Utah, U.S.

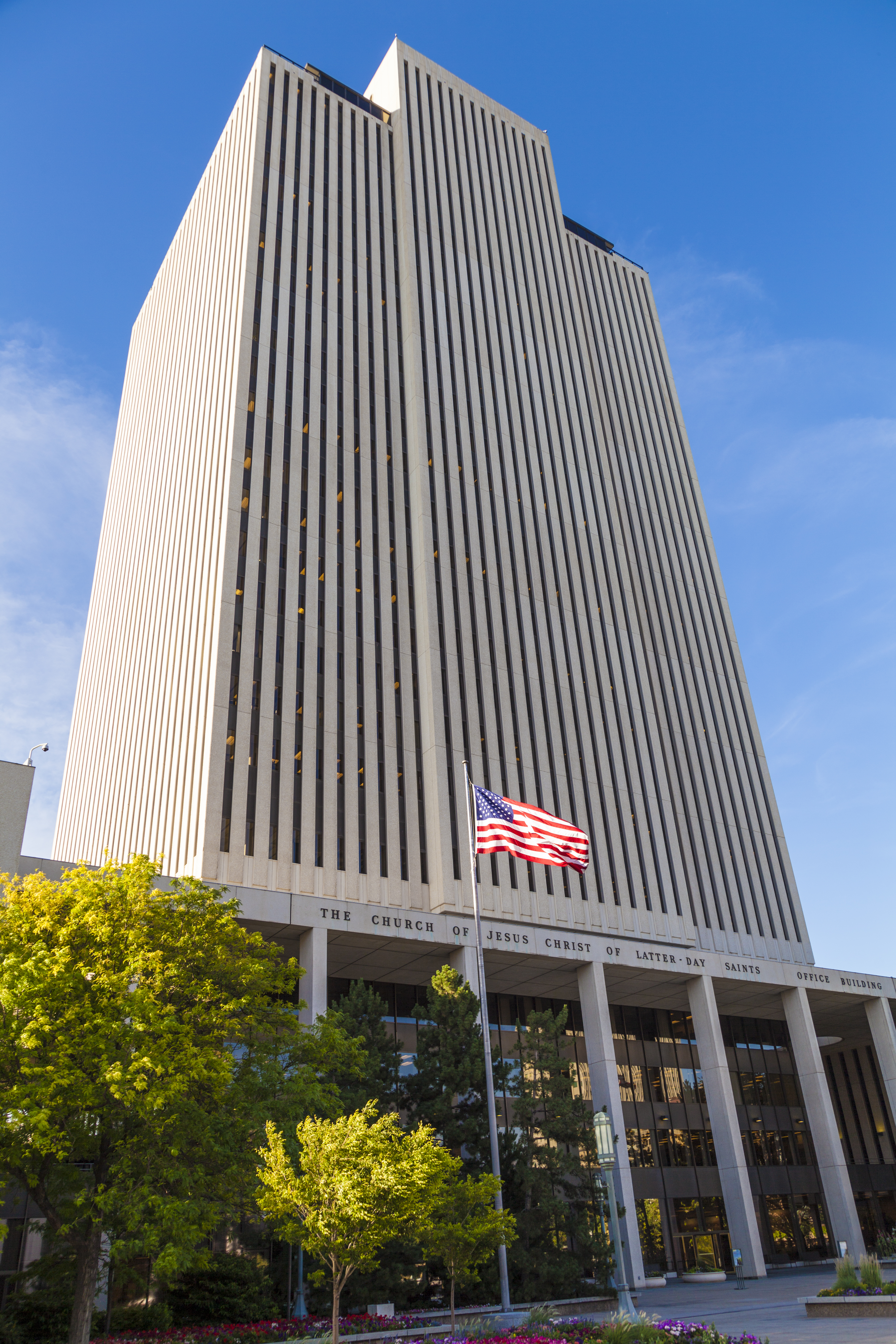
- The building in 2013

General information
- Location: 50 E. North Temple, Salt Lake City, Utah, U.S.84150
- Coordinates: 40°46′16″N 111°53′22″W
- Construction started: 1962
- Completed: 1972
- Cost: $31 million
- Owner: The Church of Jesus Christ of Latter-day Saints

Height
- Antenna spire: 435 ft (133 m)
- Roof: 420 ft (130 m)

Technical details
- Floor count: 28

Design and construction
- Architect: George Cannon Young

The Church Office Building is a 28-story building in Salt Lake City, Utah, United States, which houses the administrative support staff for the lay ministry of the Church of Jesus Christ of Latter-day Saints (LDS Church) throughout the world.

The building is 420 ft (128 m) tall at roof level and is located within the Temple Square complex on the corner of North Temple and State Street. From 1973 until 1998 the office building was the state's tallest structure.

== History ==
The building was designed by George Cannon Young at a cost of US$31 million to build. Construction took place from 1962 to 1972. It was officially dedicated on 24 July 1975 though it was in partial use by 1972. Upon its completion, LDS Church leadership centralized its offices in this location, which has facilitated the direction of the expanding religious organization. Work performed within the building includes the production of church-related magazines, translation of church materials into numerous languages, regulation of missionary efforts, production of church films, and matters relating to the construction of temples, and more.

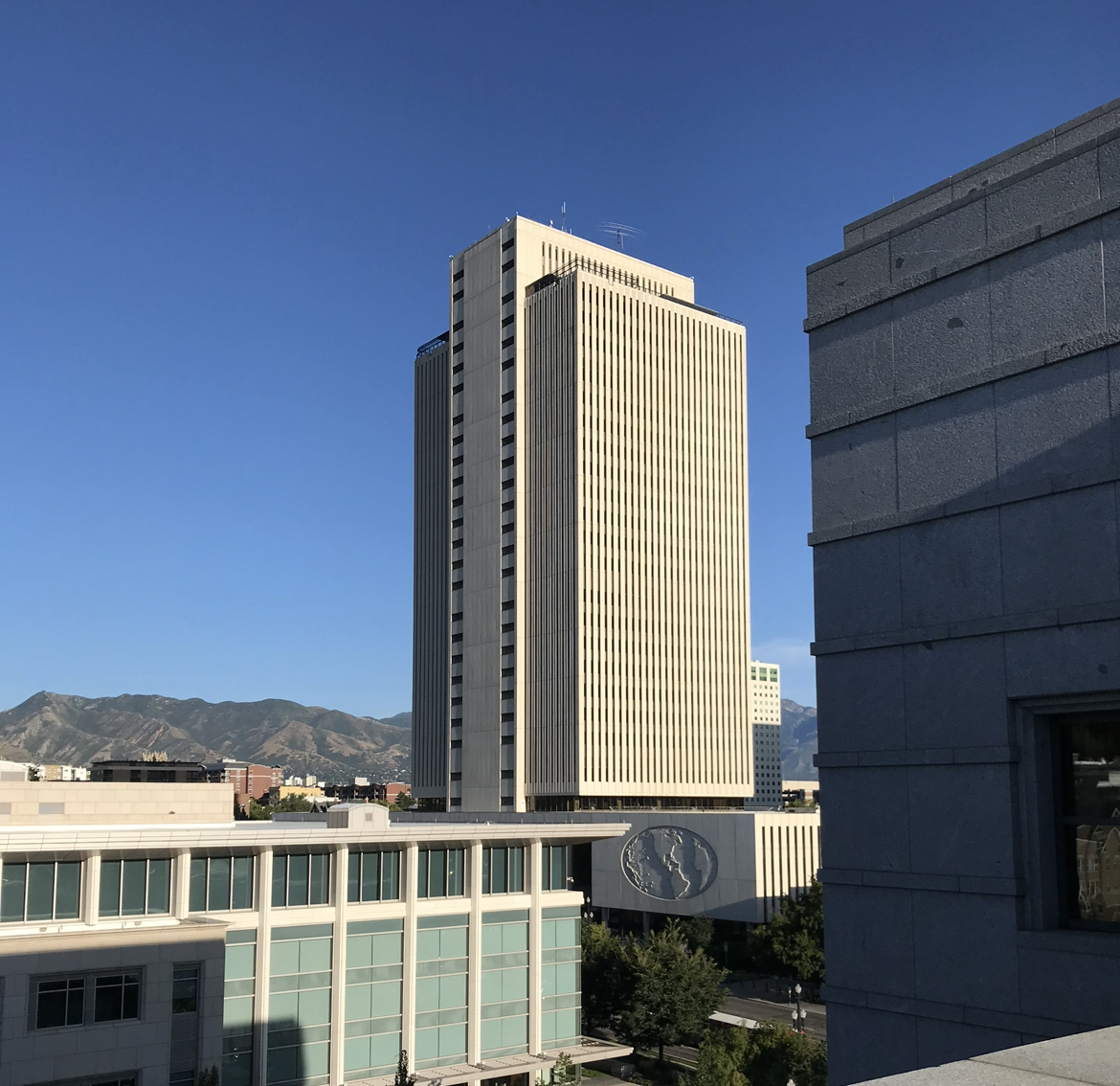
The Church Office Building from the LDS Conference Center

In 1985, the Genealogical Society was moved to another building across the street. During the 2002 Winter Olympics, the west side of the building was draped with the image of a female figure skater.

The lobby of the building is dominated by a massive mural depicting the Great Commission. The lobby also features a statue honoring Mormon pioneer sacrifices, which depicts a husband and wife burying an infant child. The inscription reads, "That the struggles, sacrifices and the sufferings of the faithful pioneers and the cause they represented shall never be forgotten."

The first four floors of the building expand outward, to the west and east, to form wings. The north side of each of these wings are without windows, each having stone facades, with large ovals containing relief maps of the two hemispheres of the earth. On the tower itself, the southern, western, and eastern facades all feature a closely spaced vertical pinstripe pattern of cast quartzite columns flanking the narrow windows, visually reminiscent of the former World Trade Center in New York City, a contemporary structure. The building's northern facade is marked by a narrow blank wall in the center, indicating the building's elevator and service core, with the regular pinstripe pattern on either side. This central part of the tower rises two floors above the observation deck at the 26th floor, and protrudes outward slightly on the southern side.

The observation deck is open to the public for free, and provides a good view of Antelope Island and the Great Salt Lake to the northwest, the Wasatch Mountains to the north and east, the skyline of the city to the south, the Oquirrh Mountains to the west, and Temple Square to the immediate west. Visitors can also take a free tour of the gardens surrounding the building. The gardens are completely redesigned every six months, and feature an array of exotic plants and flowers.

== See also ==
- List of tallest buildings in Salt Lake City

Preceded by Utah State Capitol	Tallest building in Salt Lake City; 1973–1998; 128 m	Succeeded by Wells Fargo Center
