= Operation Rio Grande =

Public safety operation in Salt Lake City, Utah

Operation Rio Grande was a massive multi-agency collaboration to promote public safety in the Rio Grande neighborhood of Salt Lake City, Utah. It consisted of three phases. Phase one was rolled out on August 14, 2017. Phase one was targeted enforcement of laws. Phase two was rehabilitation of offenders who were arrested in phase one. Phase three was to find jobs for all rehabilitated offenders. Its biggest impact was on Salt Lake's homeless population, as this particular neighborhood had a very high density of homeless people and homeless services. The two year cost to fund the operation was estimated at US$67 million.

== Details ==
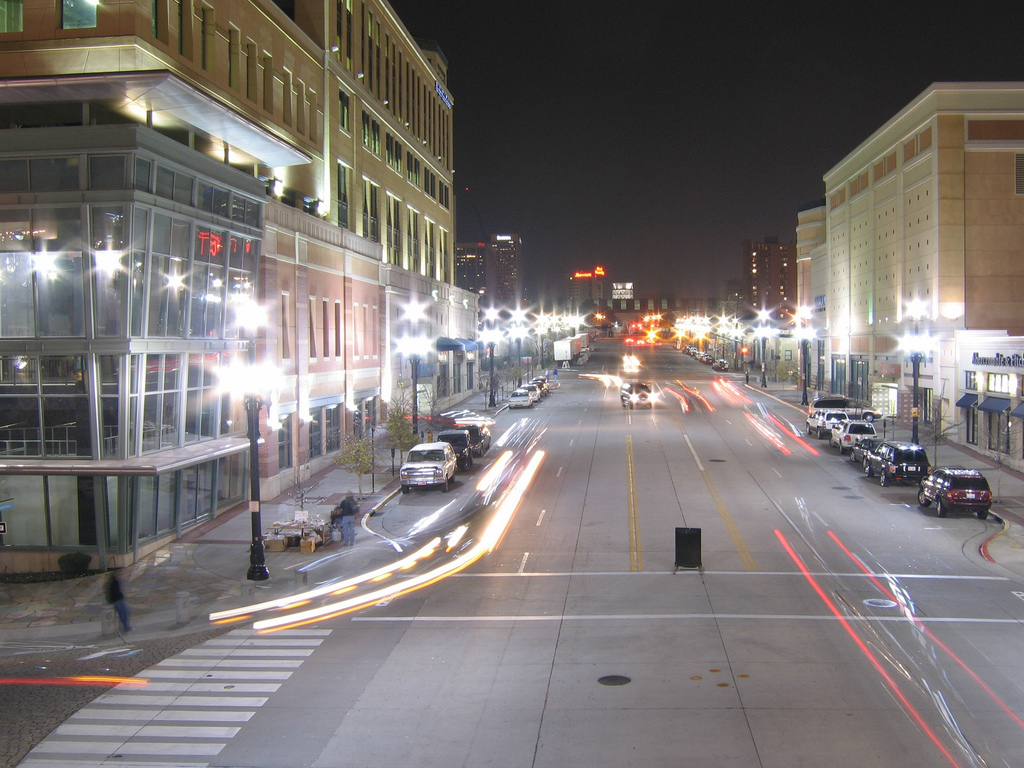
Rio Grande Street, Salt Lake City

Operation Rio Grande started its three phase rollout on August 14, 2017, in the Rio Grande neighborhood of Salt Lake City, Utah. The first phase was enforcement of laws. Part of the operation included an order from Salt Lake City Mayor Jackie Biskupski, shutting down Rio Grande Street permanently to vehicles and pedestrians to create a drug free zone. Mayor Biskupski stalled the closure for three weeks while she took public comment and went through city processes. Utah state Governor Gary Herbert has called the state legislature into a special session to discuss the various aspects of the massive crackdown and intervention.

The operation has led to over 1000 arrests including persons that are homeless, and drug dealers. Agencies participating are the Utah Department of Public Safety, state probation and parole officers, Utah Highway Patrol, social workers, and lawyers. The operation has also led to arrests in Ogden, Utah. Out of the over 1000 people arrested, 676 non-violent offenders were released because of jail overcrowding, ability to obtain bail or to attend court dates. Most of the charges were for misdemeanors. Of the arrestees, 35 have been identified as being eligible for Salt Lake's drug court. One person declined the offer of drug court. Each qualified arrestee must go to a drug bed for long-term addiction treatment. Completion of drug court means that any current and previous drug charges will be expunged from their record.

The purge is causing a spillover into outlying neighborhoods. It is also causing spillover into southern Utah and authorities there are worried about collateral impact such as theft, vandalism, loitering, trespassing, drug dealing, public intoxication, and violence.

Utah House Speaker Greg Hughes and Department of Public Safety Commissioner Keith Squires also emphasized that the law enforcement prong of Operation Rio Grande—its name aside—won't be confined to the Rio Grande area. If wrongdoers "run and try to hide at the Jordan River, we're going to the Jordan River. If they're going to South Salt Lake, we're going to South Salt Lake. West Valley—were going there," Hughes said. "This is not about a geographic area, per se, as it is what has hurt this community, the state and the people that live in it. And we're going to eradicate that."

The Utah House Speaker, and also Utah Lieutenant Governor Spencer Cox estimate the two year cost of the operation to be $67 million.
