= Walker Center =

Building in Salt Lake City, Utah, U.S.

- Walker Bank Building
- U.S. National Register of Historic Places
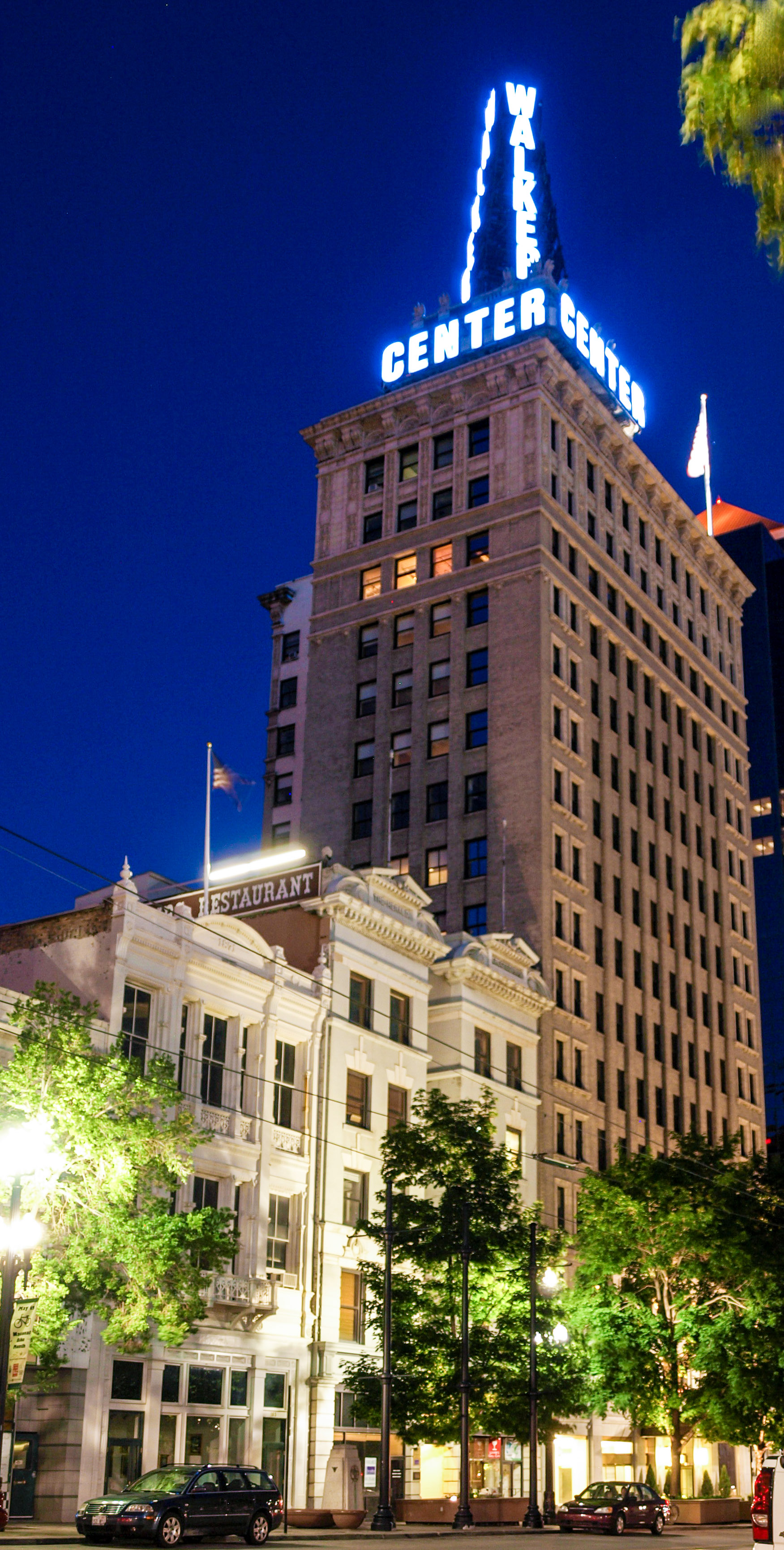
- Night view of the Walker Center, May 2009

- Location within Utah Location within the United States
- Location: 175 South Main Street; Salt Lake City, Utah; United States
- Coordinates: 40°45′55″N 111°53′24″W
- Built: 1911
- Architect: Eames and Young; Stewart, James & Co.
- Architectural style: Skyscraper
- NRHP reference No.: 06000929
- Added to NRHP: October 04, 2006

Walker Center (formerly Walker Bank Building) is a skyscraper in Salt Lake City, Utah, United States.

== Description ==
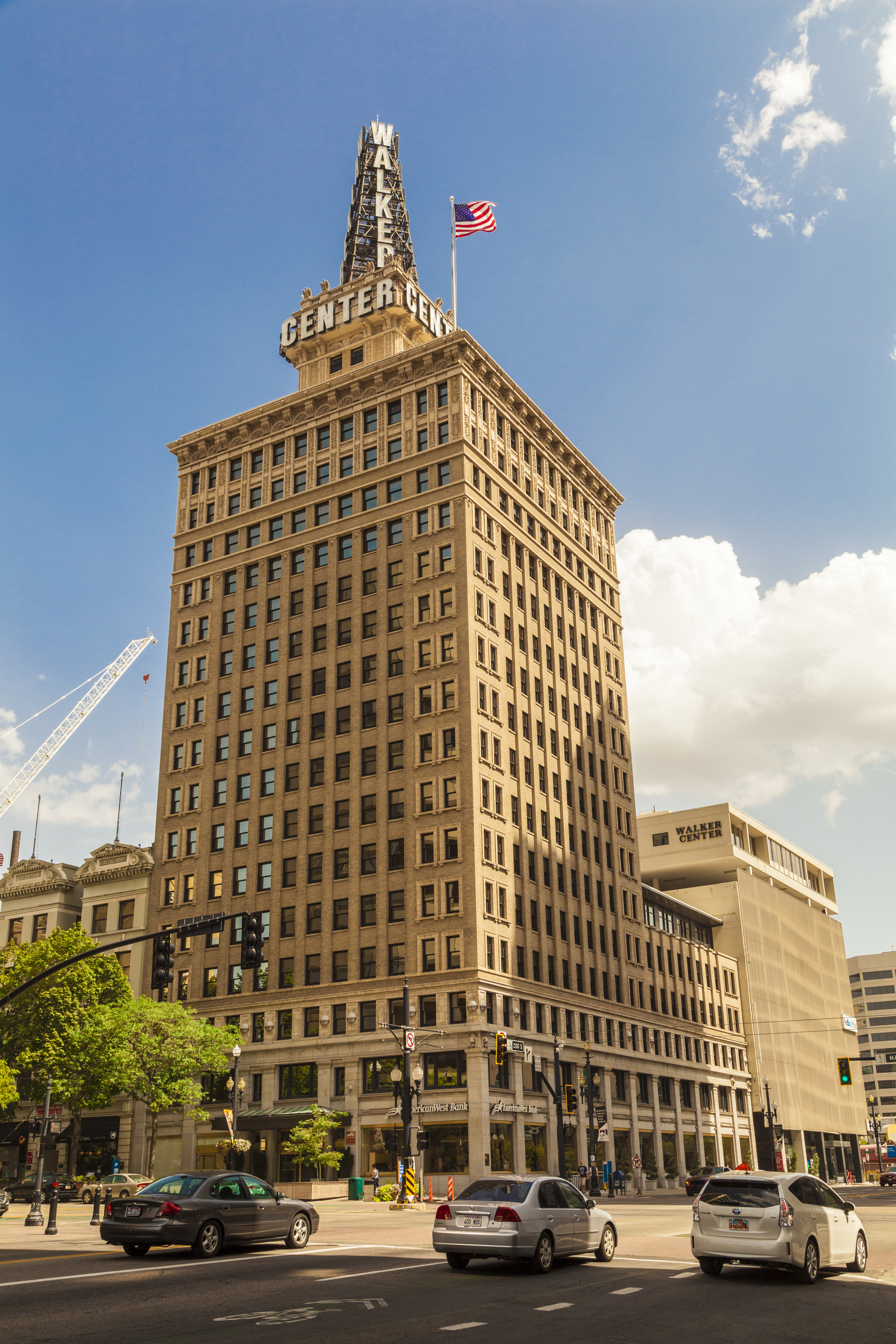
The Walker Center from 200 South

The building was opened on December 9, 1912, taking a little over a year to be built. It was originally constructed as the headquarters for Walker Bank, founded in Salt Lake City in 1859 by the Walker brothers: Samuel Sharp, Joseph Robinson, David Frederick, and Matthew Walker, Jr. The basement originally contained the vault for the bank, as well as a barbershop, florist, cigar store, and other shops. The main floor contained the bank, and upper floors were used as office space.

The St. Louis, Missouri-based architecture firm Eames and Young designed the structure, which is an example of the Chicago school design style.

Walker Bank was headquartered in the building until a 1981 merger with First Interstate Bancorp; First Interstate merged with Wells Fargo in 1996. Walker Center still operates as a multi-use office and business building, with leasing managed by Colliers.

== Weather tower ==
The Walker Center is topped by a 64-foot weather tower, which gives a weather forecast based on the color of the lights. A local radio station originally installed the tower when based in the building in the 1940s. The weather tower was taken down in the 1980s due to a city ordinance but the tower was replaced in 2008 with upgrades for safety and code compliance. The meaning of the tower colors are:

- Blue: clear skies
- Flashing blue: cloudy skies
- Red: rain
- Flashing red: snow

A common mnemonic used by residents to remember the signals given by the tower is "Solid blue: skies are too, flashing blue: clouds are due, solid red: rain ahead, flashing red: snow instead." In December 2021, work began to upgrade the neon glass tubes to GLLS LED Neon Flex product. While the weather forecast will still be broadcast, the tower now will have "any color under the rainbow, as well as various animation effects” to promote holidays and other events.

== See also ==
- National Register of Historic Places listings in Salt Lake City

Preceded by Joseph Smith Memorial Building	Tallest Building in Salt Lake City; 1912–1916; 67m	Succeeded by Utah State Capitol
