= Salt Lake Hardware Building =

Historic warehouse in Salt Lake City, Utah, United States

- Salt Lake Hardware Company Warehouse
- U.S. National Register of Historic Places
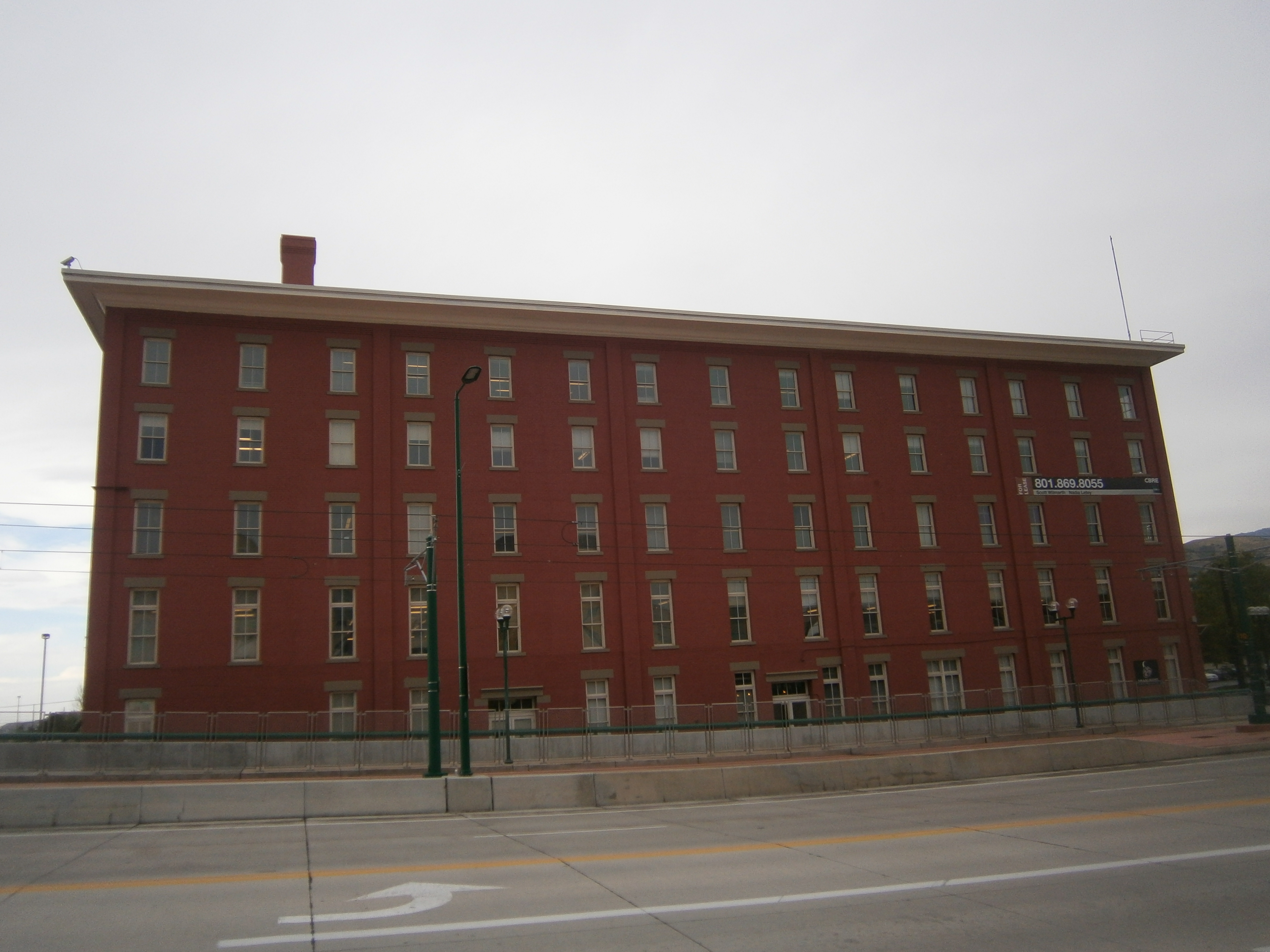
- Salt Lake Hardware Building, September 2014

- Location within Utah
- Location: 155 N 400 W, Salt Lake City, Utah
- Coordinates: 40°46′19″N 111°54′9″W
- Area: 2.5 acres (1.0 ha)
- NRHP reference No.: 01001082
- Added to NRHP: October 4, 2001

The Salt Lake Hardware Building is a converted warehouse building, located at 155 N 400 West in Salt Lake City, Utah. United States, that is listed on the National Register of Historic Places.

== Description ==
In 1996, with the help of FFKR Architects, the warehouse was converted to office space for Albertsons operations, but currently it is used for commercial office space. The design was special in that it allowed the building to maintain the historic aspects. In 2001, the building was listed on the National Register of Historic Places. At that time there was a water tower on the roof; the tower has since been renovated and renewed. The building was built in 1909, just north of a depot of the Oregon Short Line Railroad.

In 2018 the first phase of a new, adjacent apartment complex was completed and named the Hardware Apartments.

== See also ==
- National Register of Historic Places listings in Salt Lake City
