= Utah Theater =

Former movie theater in Salt Lake City, Utah, United States

Coordinates: 40°45′57″N 111°53′30″W

The Utah Theatre was a historic theater in Salt Lake City, Utah in the United States. It opened in 1918 as the Pantages Theater, after the name of its owner, Alexander Pantages. The theatre was located at 148 South Main Street, Salt Lake City.

== History ==
Formerly known by the names Pantages and RKO Orpheum, the theatre was built in 1918. The theater was originally built for vaudeville at the princely sum of over two million dollars (equivalent to $43 million in 2025), making it among the most expensive and opulent structures in the Pantages theater chain. The structure, designed by celebrated architect B. Marcus Priteca, was built in the interior of a city block, and reached by long grand gallery extending to Main Street. The interior lobby was done in an exotic, neo-classical "Pantages Greek" style with ornate plaster work, an inlaid marble floor, and ramps ascending to the mezzanine level. The interior was accented with Alaskan marble and faux tile. The auditorium's proscenium was flanked with marble columns and gilded opera boxes. The hall's ceiling was decorated with a Tiffany skylight. The main floor of the auditorium seated 1,700, and the balcony accommodated an additional 600 patrons. Babe Ruth performed there in 1927. Abbott and Costello, Will Rogers, and many other celebrities also performed in the theater during its heyday.

The theater functioned as a vaudeville venue through the 1920s, before being converted into a movie palace during the 1930s. Through most of the decade, the theater was owned by Radio-Keith Orpheum and was renamed the RKO Orpheum. By 1937, however, it had taken the name the Utah Theater, which has endured to the present. One of the highlights of the Utah as a movie venue was during the mid-1960s, when The Sound of Music had a run in the theater that lasted two years. In 1968, the theater was split into upper and lower levels, with the balcony being transformed into a second auditorium. This architectural arrangement, commonly known as "piggybacking," was frequently imposed on older traditional theaters during the 1960s and early 1970s. With this transformation, an escalator ascended from the Utah's mezzanine to the top rows of the balcony. During the remodeling the proscenium, box seating and some of the elaborate ornamentation was removed. In 1988, the structure ceased operation as a movie theater, and was used by local dance company until 1992, when the building was sold. After passing through the hands of various owners, the vacant building was purchased by the Salt Lake City Redevelopment Agency (RDA) in 2009.

== Redevelopment controversy ==
In 2019, Salt Lake City signed an agreement with developers Hines and LaSalle to sell the Utah Theatre property. In exchange for a guarantee that the future residential development would have at least 10% of its units be affordable housing, as well as a requirement to build and maintain a green space with public access, the RDA sold the property for $0 to the developers. In early 2021, the developers proposed a 31-story, 400-unit apartment tower at the site that would require the demolition of the Utah Theatre. The deal has proven to be controversial and has sparked efforts to save the theatre from demolition. Supporters of this effort dispute the city's estimates for the cost of renovating the theatre, which the city has cited to be $60-$80 million.

Part of the sale agreement stipulated that the Utah Theatre be well-documented for historical purposes. The result of these efforts, including a complete virtual reconstruction of the theatre, can be found online. Hines is planning to save some artifacts from the theatre and reuse them in the new building, particularly the Tiffany skylight.

On November 10, 2021, the theatre was legally conveyed to Hines in fulfillment of the deal that was made two years earlier.

Demolition of the structure began on April 19, 2022. As of June 2023, construction of the new residential development had been delayed.

The controversy continued when developer Hines missed their first development deadline raising concerns the development would happen at all. Hines blamed "unprecedented market changes" for the projects delay. "We continue to be fully committed to the project and the Salt Lake community," a Hines spokesperson added, but with no work occurring since the demolition, the project ever coming to fruition is in doubt.
