= One Utah Center =

Skyscraper in Salt Lake City

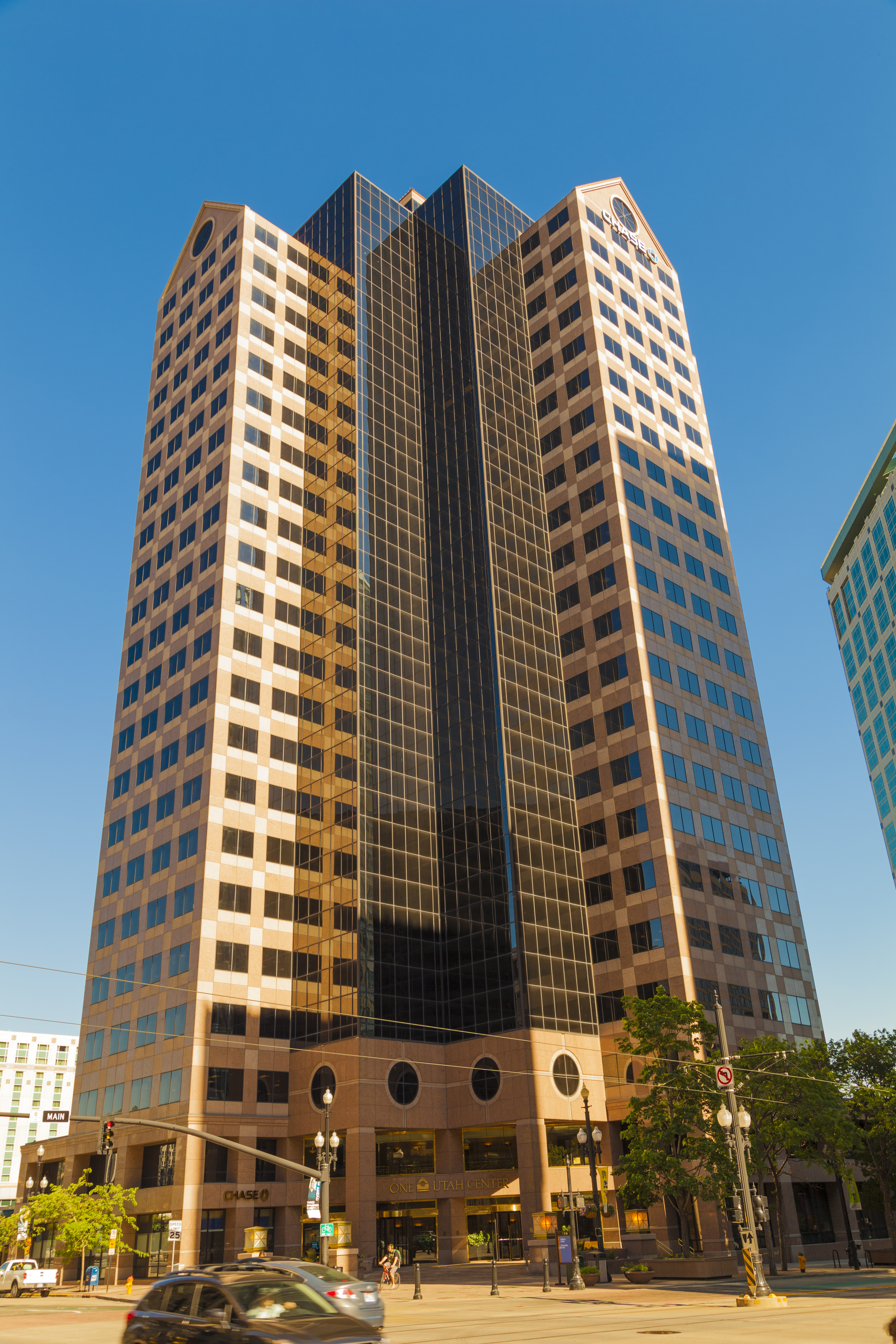
- Interactive map of the One Utah Center area

General information
- Location: Salt Lake City, Utah, United States
- Coordinates: 40°45′53.53″N 111°53′25.97″W

One Utah Center is a skyscraper in downtown Salt Lake City, Utah. It was built by the Boyer Company in 1991. The building has 24 floors with the 24th containing two conference rooms.
