= Eccles Theater =

Theatre in Salt Lake City, UT

George S. and Dolores Doré Eccles Theater
- Eccles Theater
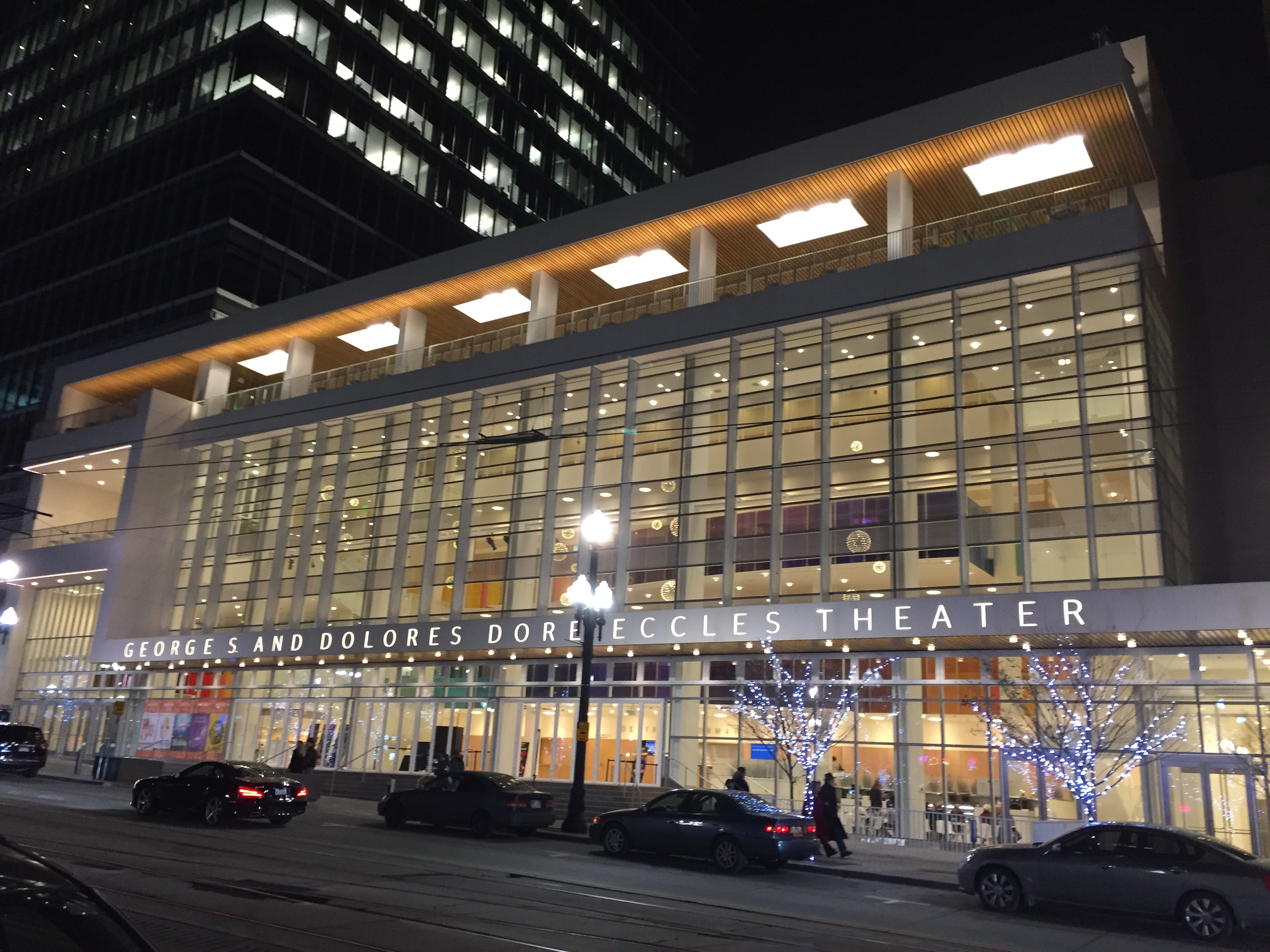
- Interactive map of George S. and Dolores Doré Eccles Theater
- Address: 131 South Main Street; Salt Lake City, Utah; United States
- Coordinates: 40.766405°N 111.890570°W
- Seating type: Reserved
- Capacity: 2,468
- Type: Performing arts

Construction
- Groundbreaking: June 3, 2014
- Opened: October 21, 2016
- Cost: $119 million

Website
- Official website

The George S. and Dolores Doré Eccles Theater (commonly shortened to the Eccles Theater) is located in Salt Lake City, Utah. Opened in 2016, it hosts touring Broadway shows, concerts, and other entertainment events. The primary "Delta Performance Hall" seats 2,468 people, while a smaller black box theater (the "Regent Street theater") seats 150-250 people.
