= BYU Division of Continuing Education =

Part of Brigham Young University in the US

The BYU Continuing Education (CE) is part of Brigham Young University (BYU) that oversees continuing education programs.

== History ==
Attempts at BYU to offer continuing education programs date back to Karl G. Maeser offering night classes to workers at the Provo Woolen Mills in 1876. However night classes and other attempts to reach out to non-matriculated students were haphazard through the next few decades.

The Polysophical Society was organized in 1877 to give lectures open to the general public. At first most of the lectures were given by students. By 1903 the program was organized as the lyceum program with John C. Swensen as its director and most of the lectures were either by BYU faculty or by professors and lecturers invited from elsewhere.

The CE as an organization began in 1921 when Franklin S. Harris, BYU's president, organized the Extension Division. Lowry Nelson served as the first director. Nelson believed that educational opportunity should not be limited to those who could formally attend colleges and universities in the standard campus format. In 1946, Harold Glen Clark was made director of the extension division. Clark oversaw a major expansion of the role of BYU and the expansion or creation of many of the programs that BYU still offers, staying at the head of the program until he became the first president of the Provo Temple.

== Programs or events ==
=== Bachelor of General Studies ===
The Bachelor of General Studies (BGS) program is an accredited bachelor's degree from BYU, designed to help former students who left the university without completing a degree. The program's motto is "Finish at home what you started at BYU." Students may apply previously earned credit towards their final degree.

Students who are formally accepted into the program complete a BGS degree, with a major in General Studies, and an emphasis in American Studies, English, Family Life, History, Management or Psychology.

=== BYU FlexGE ===
Students in the FlexGE program take classes at BYU and participate in campus activities without being admitted to BYU as degree-seeking students. Completed credits are transferrable to degree-seeking programs at BYU or other universities. Available class options include evening classes on the Provo campus, classes at the BYU Salt Lake Center, and daytime classes on the Provo campus during spring and summer. FlexGE students are eligible to live in BYU contracted housing.

=== Evening classes ===
Evening classes offered allows students and members of the community to attend BYU classes without formally applying to the university. Classes can be taken to satisfy degree requirements for transfer to another university, or to satisfy educational or career goals.

=== Education Week ===
Education Week is a one-week time of lectures in August. Most of the participants are adults, significantly more females than males, who want to augment their personal enrichment or education. However, there are also teenage youth participants with some lectures aimed specifically at teenagers and even dances for the youth. The minimum age for participation is 14. Over 1,000 classes are offered.

The program started in 1922, originally as a leadership week. It was originally held during the winter to allow for attendance by farmers. In 1950 it moved to the summer and in 1963 the name was changed to Education Week.

In 2024, attendance was over 15,000 .

Some Education Week lectures are broadcast over the satellite network owned by the Church of Jesus Christ of Latter-day Saints (LDS Church), while others are shown on BYUtv.

=== Conferences and workshops ===
BYU's CE oversees a range of conferences and workshops. Many of these are short summer programs aimed at improving the skills of specific groups such as adults, professionals, and youth.

=== BYU Women's Conference ===
BYU Women's Conference is a two-day conference that was previously co-sponsored by the Relief Society organization, and is now a BYU program coordinated by Continuing Education, like BYU Education Week. Both days of the conference begin and end with a general session in the Marriott Center, where all participants meet together which began in 1976.

Between the general sessions there are three one-hour concurrent sessions, with up to 16 sessions to choose from each hour. Topics, centered on the annual theme, include home, family, marriage, service, gospel (scripture, doctrine), and other topics such as missionary work and education—all discussed from a gospel perspective and directed toward women.

The attendance for the 2025 Women's Conference was more than 12,000 attendees, featuring over 90 sessions led by 175 speakers.

=== Especially for Youth ===
Especially for Youth is a program run through BYU CE for youth ages 14–18 with the goal of helping the central mission statement to "help them come unto Christ". It seeks to emphasize physical, spiritual, intellectual and social growth. Although run through BYU and with large numbers of participants at BYU it also occurs at various locations throughout the United States and abroad. The program is mainly run on university campuses.

=== Dance camps ===
BYU Dance Camps offers dance instruction in ballet, ballroom, clogging, ethnic, folk, jazz, modern and tap. Faculty from BYU's Dance Department, along with guest instructors, direct and teach the Dance Camps. BYU's Dance Department is an accredited institutional member of the National Association of Schools of Dance.

=== Independent study ===
The BYU Independent Study program offers over 470 courses. They are grouped under four general course headings: university, high school, middle school, and free. The program is headquartered in the Harman Continuing Education Building (HCEB). BYU Independent Study began in 1921.

BYU's high school level independent study courses are accredited by both the Northwest Accreditation Commission and the Distance Education and Training Council. The program has been praised as an option for home schooling parents.

In May 2010, the NCAA banned the use of BYU Independent Study high school courses as course credit for students bound for Division I schools. This was done because Michael Oher had several years earlier used BYU Independent Study courses to boost his grades. However it was done without consulting BYU on the matter. After the announcement of disallowance the NCAA said that they wanted courses to have mandated student/teacher interaction and to have a minimum course completion time. BYU's courses generally have maximum completion times but not minimum ones.

== Locations ==
=== BYU Conference Center ===
The BYU Conference Center is located on the northeastern part of campus, and shares a lobby with the Harman Continuing Education Building. The Conference Center is primarily used for university sponsored conferences and events, but is also available for rent by groups outside the university.

=== BYU Salt Lake Center ===
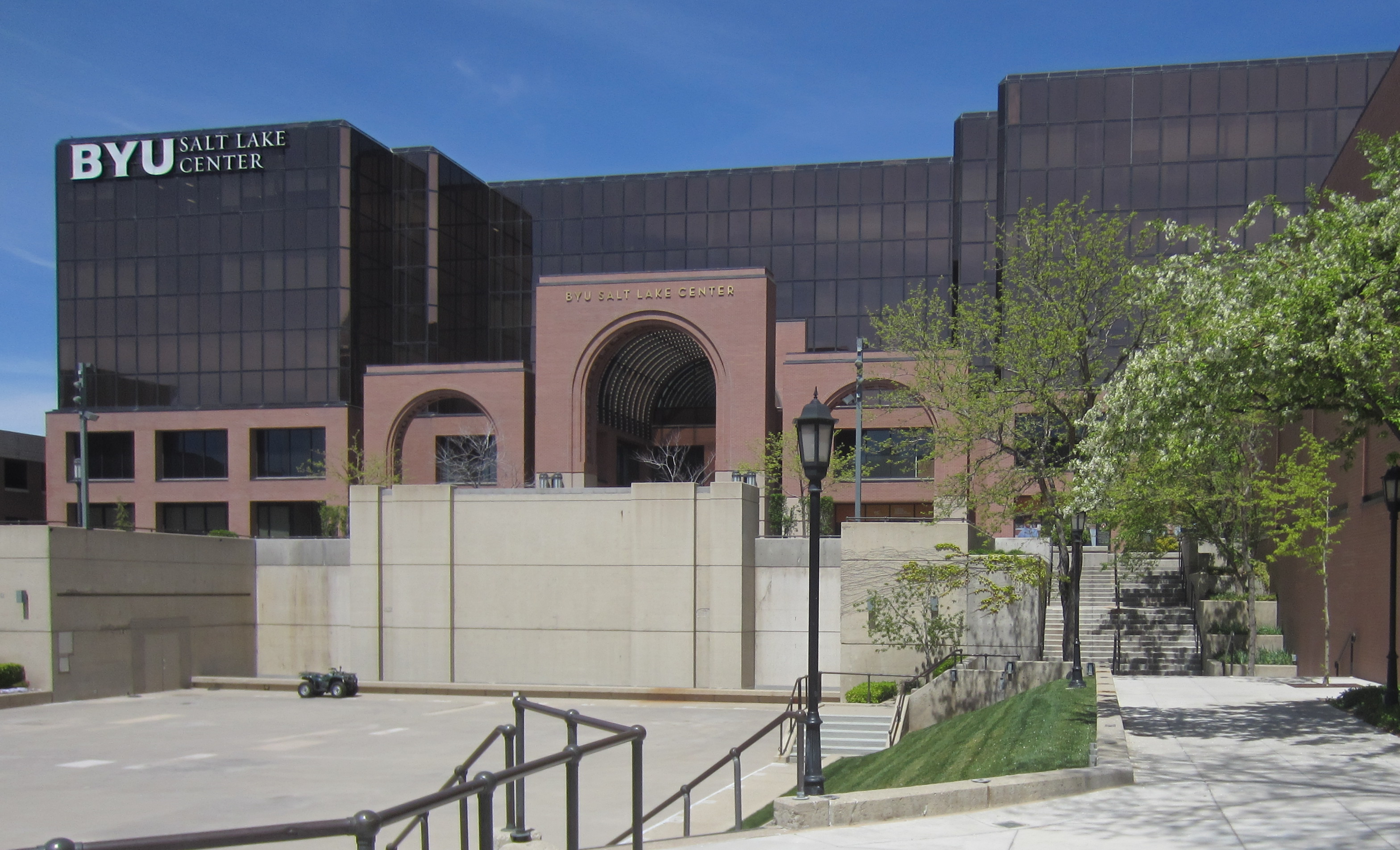
BYU Salt Lake Center, Triad Center

The BYU Salt Lake Center is one of two satellite campuses operated by BYU. Beginning in 1952, lectures and classes were periodically offered by BYU faculty in Salt Lake City. In January 1959, the BYU Salt Lake Center was formally organized with Lynn M. Hilton as chairman. It was originally located in the Alfred McCune House, but this proved to be too small for the program and some courses were offered at the Craft House, Barrett Hall, the Salt Lake Assembly Hall, the Institute of Religion building adjacent to the University of Utah, and other locations.

In 1972, the Salt Lake Center was relocated from the McCune House to the former Veteran's Hospital at 401 Twelfth Avenue. In 1986, it was moved to a building on 3900 South and a few years later moved again to a building on Highland Drive, which was dedicated in 1998. In 2007, the Salt Lake Center was moved to the Triad Center, just west of Temple Square. The state of Utah then purchased the center's former Highland Drive building in exchange for a former state office building downtown, which later became in the church's West Office Building.

=== BYU Barlow Center ===
The BYU Barlow Center located in Washington, D.C., houses BYU Washington Seminar students, the Church's Office of International and Government Affairs, Church Educational System offices and rooms for institute classes, and a student branch.

=== BYU London Centre ===
The BYU London Centre is a study abroad center. Students enroll through the BYU campus in Utah, travel to Liverpool, Preston, the Lake District, York, Oxford, Dover, and Canterbury—in addition to visits to Dublin, Republic of Ireland and Belfast, Northern Ireland. Students live in the center for programs that extend for the semester.

== Defunct ==
The Ricks Center was authorized in July 1956. It was created after Ricks College (now BYU-Idaho) went from being a 4-year college back to being a two-year college. It was formed largely to provide continuing education classes to teachers. J. Kenneth Thatcher, who was the superintendent of the Sugar-Salem School District in Idaho, was hired to organize the center. Besides classes on the Ricks College campus the center also offered classes through its sub-office in Idaho Falls, Idaho.

The BYU-Ogden Center was located in the old Institute of Religion building in Ogden, which was vacated when a new building was set up near the new Weber Junior College (now Weber State University) campus in 1957. In establishing the center, Ernest L. Wilkinson, president of BYU, and Joseph Fielding Smith, chairman of the executive committee of the BYU Board of Trustees, sent a letter in which they emphasized that the institution was geared toward adult continuing education programs and not meant at all to compete with Weber Junior College. Mark A. Benson, a son of Ezra Taft Benson, was appointed as the first director of the Ogden Center when it opened in August 1957.

The BYU-California center was started in 1959, with central offices but most courses given in LDS Church buildings scattered throughout southern California. Until 1969 almost all the courses offered were non-credit classes. Starting in 1959 the center offered an Ed.D. program.

== Sources ==
- Ernest L. Wilkinson, ed., Brigham Young University: The First 100 Years. Vol. 2, p. 782-794. These pages consist of charts that show the historical development of the various BYU colleges and their constituent departments through the end of 1975.
