= Skarin =

Skarin may refer to:

- Annalee Skarin (1899–1988), American author
- Skarin, a character in the video game Viking: Battle for Asgard
