= World Trade Center at City Creek =

High-rise office building in Salt Lake City, Utah, United States

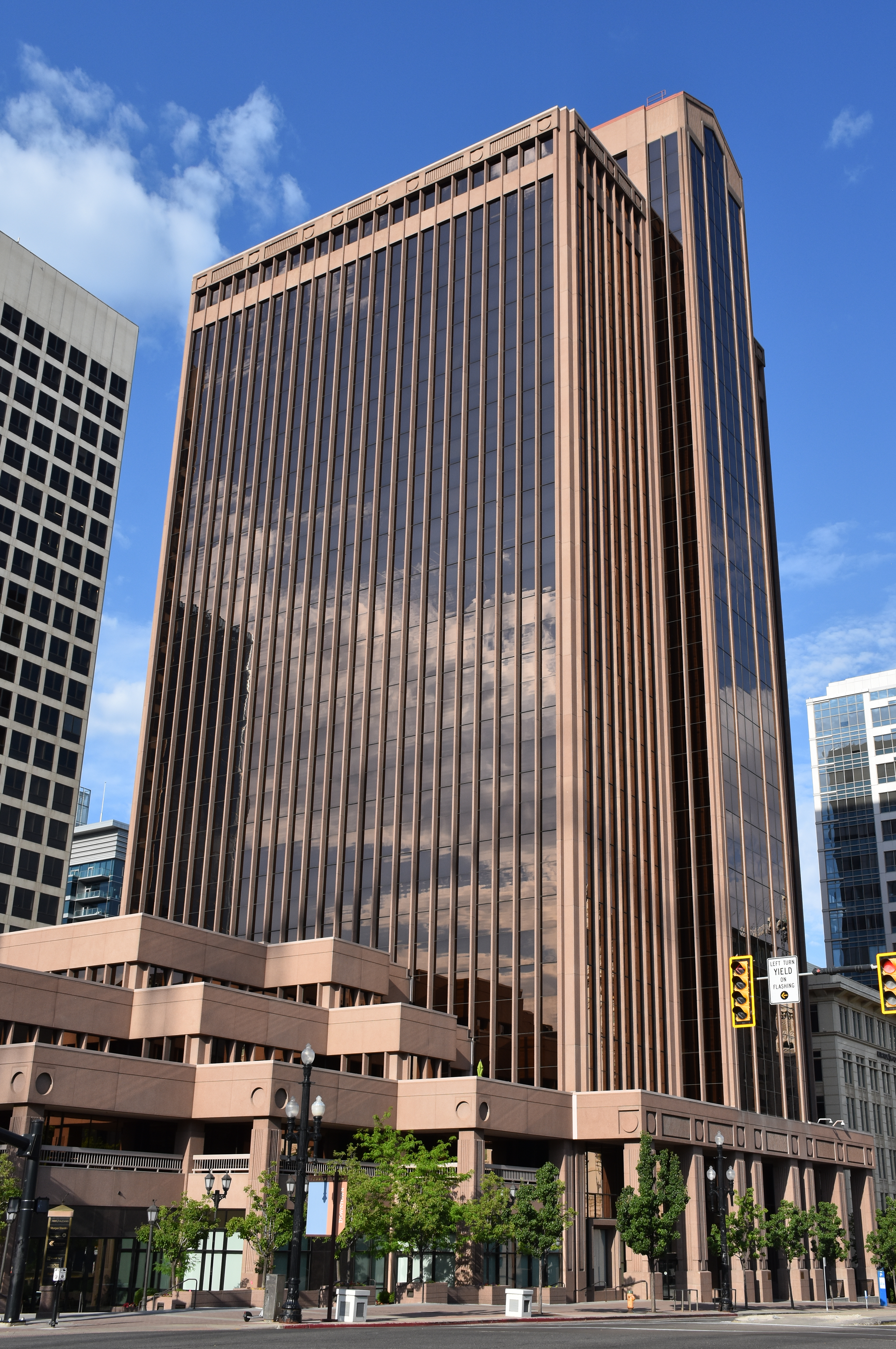
- Interactive map of the World Trade Center at City Creek area
- Former names: Eagle Gate Plaza and Tower

General information
- Location: 60 East South Temple, Salt Lake City, Utah, United States
- Coordinates: 40°46′8.91″N 111°53′20.55″W
- Year built: 1984–1986
- Topped-out: July 17, 1985
- Inaugurated: October 15, 1986
- Owner: The Church of Jesus Christ of Latter-day Saints

Height
- Height: 310 feet (94 m)

Technical details
- Floor count: 22
- Lifts/elevators: 11

Design and construction
- Architecture firm: Cooper, Carlson, Duy and Ritchie
- Developer: Zions Securities Corporation (The Church of Jesus Christ of Latter-day Saints)
- Main contractor: Christiansen Brothers, Inc.

Website
- citycreekslc.com/building-wtc

World Trade Center at City Creek (formerly Eagle Gate Plaza and Tower) is a 22-story office tower at City Creek Center in downtown Salt Lake City, Utah. Opened in 1986, the building was developed by Zions Securities Corporation, a for-profit entity owned by the Church of Jesus Christ of Latter-day Saints (LDS Church).

The structure's original name was a homage to the nearby Eagle Gate, a historic feature of downtown Salt Lake City. In 2012, the tower was incorporated into the newly built City Creek Center and its name was changed to World Trade Center at City Creek.

== Design ==
The tower has 20 stories, with an additional 2-story, centered penthouse at its top; the tower's total height is 310 feet (94 m). The east wing starts with two stories and steps up to four stories where it connects with the tower. The façade is dark-rose-colored, granite-textured precast stone with colored glass. The granite was quarried in neighboring Colorado. On the very corner of the property is the tree-shaded plaza, meant to provide a link to the Gardens at Temple Square across the street. The building's base is colonnaded to reflect the design of the nearby Beehive House and Church Administration Building. An original bronze door frame from the Federal Reserve branch building that used to be located on this site was incorporated into the entrance of the tower.

The building contains about 16,000 square feet (1,500 m^{2}) per floor, for a total of 385,000 square feet (35,800 m^{2}), of which 30,000 square feet (2,800 m^{2}) was devoted to retail space at its opening in 1986.

Below the tower is a parking level, under which is a 1,000,000-US-gallon (830,000 imp gal; 3,800,000 L) thermal water tank. During the night, air conditioning units cool the water, which is then used to cool the building in the day. Additional parking was made available with the construction of Eagle Gate Terrace garage along Social Hall Avenue on the block to the east of the tower.

== Location ==
The tower sits at the intersection of State Street and South Temple street, a prominent location in the city. The site is the former location of two historic structures: the Gardo House and just to its west, the LDS Church Historian's Home and Office. The Gardo House was demolished in 1921, and replaced with the Federal Reserve's Salt Lake City branch. The Historian's Office was demolished in 1925 and replaced with the Medical Arts Building (an office building for medical and dental providers). Both the bank structure and Medical Arts Building were acquired by Zions Securities Corporation and demolished in 1984 for construction of the tower.

== History ==
=== Construction ===
In July 1984, the LDS Church announced plans to construct an office and retail complex on property it owned at the corner of State Street and South Temple. The tower would be 22-stories high with an east wing that stepped up four stories between State Street and the tower. It would be connected to The ZCMI Center and include parking. The church did not give a cost, but local media estimated the structure would likely cost $30-40 million. Cooper, Carlson, Duy and Ritchie was the architectural firm and Christiansen Brothers, Inc. was hired as the general contractor.

Before construction could begin, the two existing buildings on the site had to be razed. The Medical Arts Building was demolished via implosion in August 1984, whereas the old Federal Reserve bank was torn down with heavy equipment. During demolition of the bank, it took three weeks of battering with a wrecking ball to break up the vault into small enough pieces to be hauled away. The demolition company had not expected the vault to be so difficult to remove and doing so consumed the profit the company had expected for the job.

A topping out ceremony was held on July 17, 1985, when the last piece of steel put in place. The ceremony was watched by participants from the 26th floor of the neighboring Beneficial Life Tower.

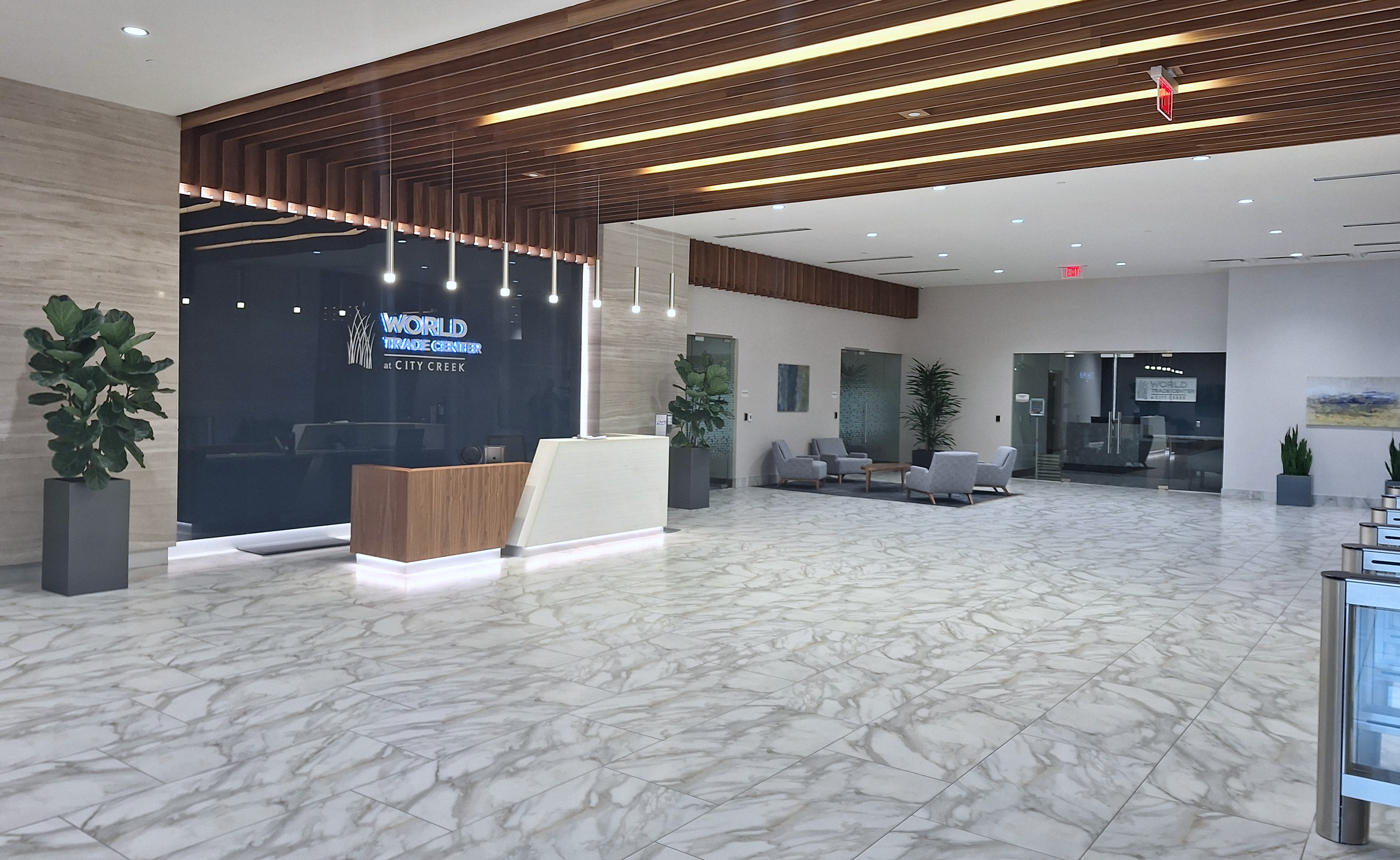
World Trade Center lobby, 2024

=== Opening ===
The first tenant to sign a lease for space in the building was Davis Graham & Stubbs, a law firm. Tenants were expected to begin moving in during late June 1986.

Eagle Gate Plaza and Tower officially opened to the public on October 15, 1986, with a dedication and ribbon cutting ceremony. The ribbon was cut by Ezra Taft Benson, president of the LDS Church.

== See also ==
- List of tallest buildings in Salt Lake City
