= ZCMI =

American department store chain

Zion's Co-operative Mercantile Institution
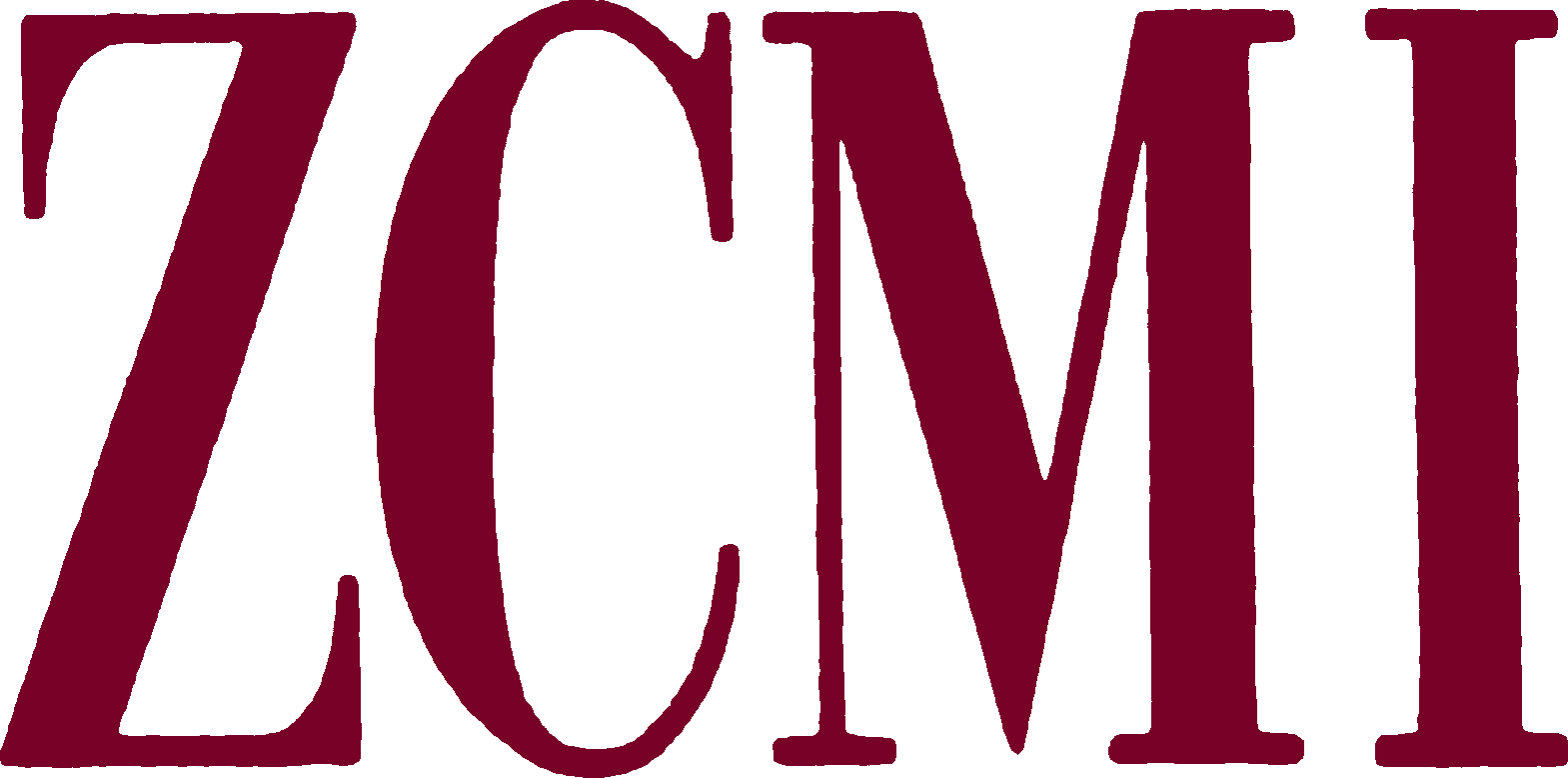
- Final logo, adopted in 2000
- Type: Department store
- Industry: Retail
- Founded: October 9, 1868
- Fate: Converted to Meier & Frank or sold to Dillard's
- Successor: Meier & Frank (2001–2006); Dillard's (2001–present); Macy's (2006–present)
- Headquarters: Salt Lake City, Utah
- Products: Clothing, footwear, bedding, furniture, jewelry, beauty products, and housewares.
- Parent: The May Department Stores Company (1999–2001)

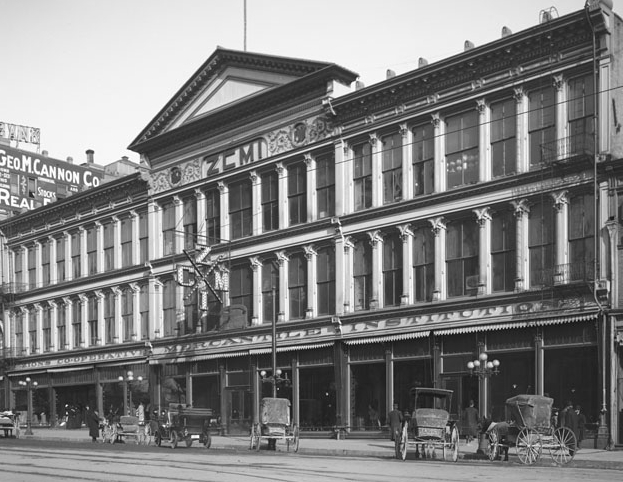
Zion's Co-operative Mercantile Institution (ZCMI), 1910

Zion's Co-operative Mercantile Institution (ZCMI) was an American department store chain. It was founded in Salt Lake City, Utah, on October 9, 1868, by Brigham Young. For many years it used the slogan, "America's First Department Store."

== History ==
Even though the Church of Jesus Christ of Latter-day Saints (LDS Church) had been headquartered in Salt Lake City for some twenty years by that time, they were despised by the surrounding community, as Young had disparaged non-Mormon merchants who had engaged in price gouging on necessities, and encouraged boycotting these businesses in 1866. Business owners who were LDS Church members were routinely charged higher prices by wholesalers who discovered they were dealing with church members.

Partly because of the impending completion of the railroad, and partly to create a more fair business atmosphere, it was Young's idea to encourage businesses owned by LDS Church members to band together under one roof. By pooling their resources, they were able to make larger orders to sell materials and goods exclusively (at the time) to fellow LDS Church members.

ZCMI was formally organized in 1868 and incorporated for a 25-year renewable contract in 1870. The central component of this was the LDS Church's purchase of the Eagle Emporium, a conglomerate of mercantile companies owned by William Jennings.

ZCMI expanded, eventually manufacturing its own line of boots and shoes, and a line of work clothes. It also sold a wide range from lumber to food preservation products and even some beauty products.

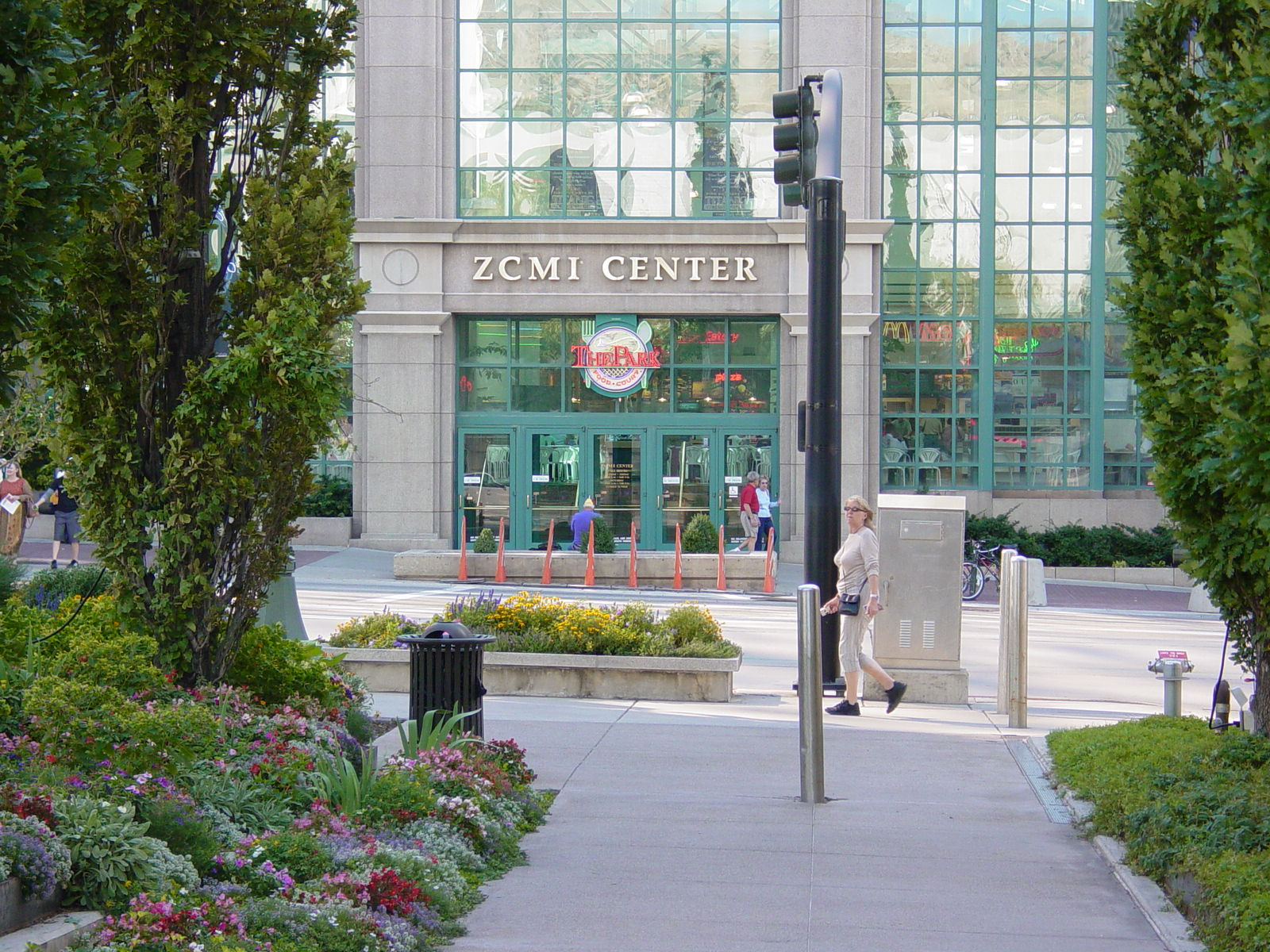
The former ZCMI Center Mall in downtown Salt Lake City, 2004

Based in Salt Lake City, it quickly became a household name in the community. The LDS Church was a significant influence in the company, retaining a majority interest in ZCMI until its eventual sale in December 1999. The store was established by a vote from the Council of Fifty, an early organization in the LDS Church. The store president would often also be LDS Church president, with Harold Harper Bennett being the first store president to not also hold the church office.

In 1990, ZCMI opened its first concept store called ZCMI II. Featuring a smaller floor plan than its usual stores, this concept sold solely men's and women's clothing and shoes, while lacking other departments such as housewares, linens, and children's clothing. The first of these opened at Tri City Mall in Mesa, Arizona in 1990.

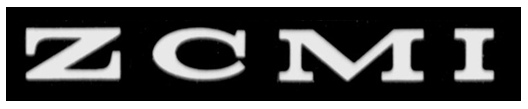
Classic logo

In October 1999, as a result of losses for two consecutive years, along with mounting economic and social pressures, ZCMI was sold to May Department Stores Company of St. Louis, ZCMI operated under its original name as a part of May's Portland-based Meier & Frank division until April 2001, when the stores adopted the Meier & Frank name. In addition to the name change, the Utah stores in Logan and St. George, along with the Idaho stores in Idaho Falls and Pocatello, were sold to Dillard's in March 2001. May Co. was sold to Federated Department Stores (now Macy's, Inc.) in 2005. In September 2006, all Meier & Frank stores were converted to Macy's.

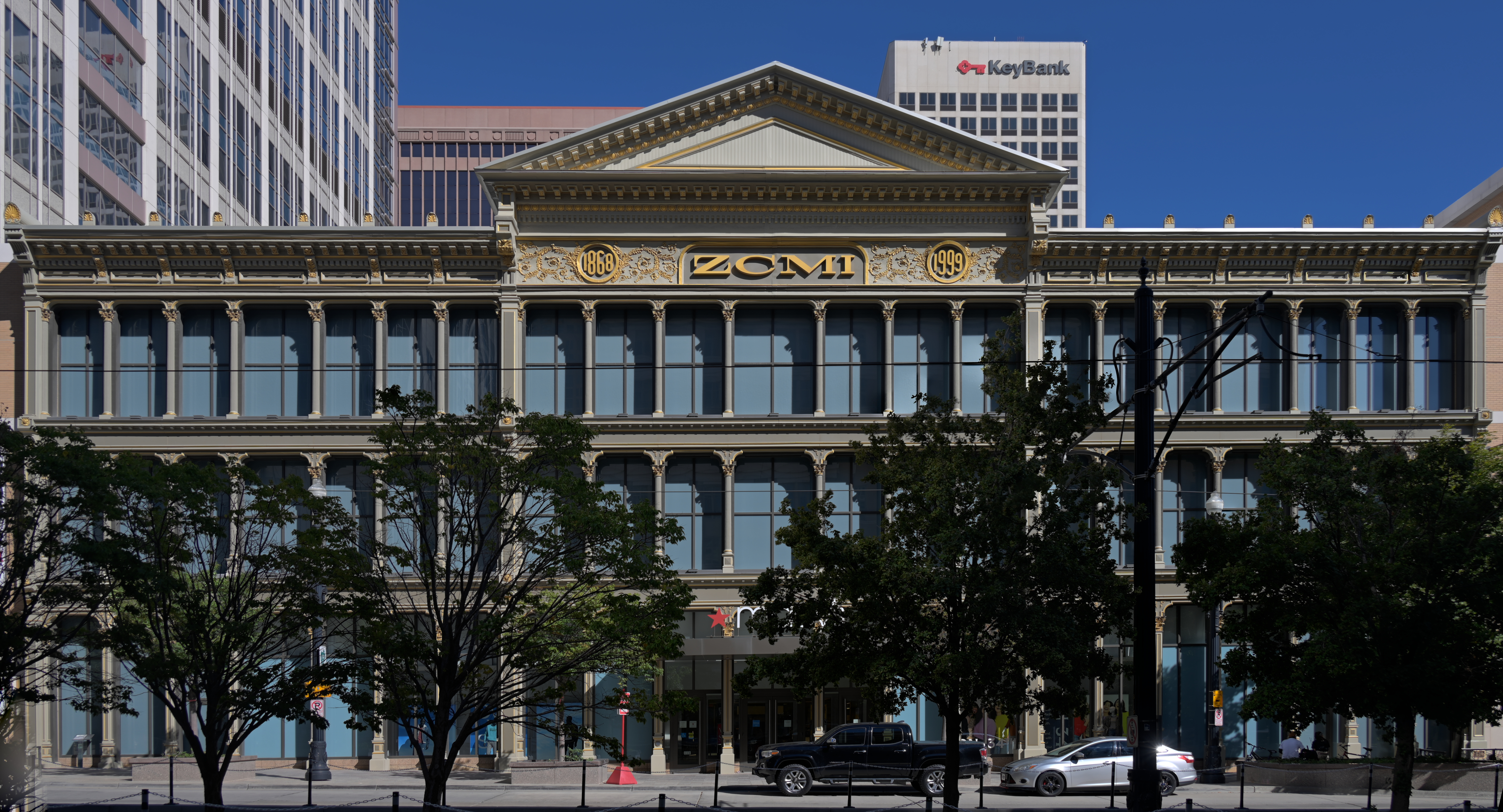
The ZCMI façade at City Creek Center, 2023

The façade of ZCMI was used in the City Creek Center, retaining the original ZCMI nameplate as a front for Macy's.

== See also ==
- ZCMI Center Mall – former LDS Church shopping center near Temple Square, Salt Lake City
- Zion's Central Board of Trade
- Zions Securities – LDS Church property portfolio
- List of department stores converted to Macy's
