= Harold Harper Bennett =

American business leader and singer

Harold Harper Bennett (September 20, 1900 - December 1, 1999) was an American business leader and singer. He is a member of the notable Bennett family.

== Early life ==
Bennett was born on September 20, 1900, in Salt Lake City, Utah to John Foster Bennett and Rosetta Elizabeth (née Wallace) Bennett. He is the brother of former U.S. Senator Wallace F. Bennett and the uncle of another former U.S. Senator, Bob Bennett. He attended Lowell School and later LDS High School. During his high school days he was buried alive in a landslide escaping only with a broken nose. The nose would remain crooked throughout his life and would be his trademark.

Bennett studied first at the University of Utah where he was the editor of both The Pen and the Utah Chronicle. It was here that he met his wife Emily Higgs Bennett who would later serve in the presidency of the LDS Young Women organization. Together they would raise 8 children. He graduated from the Business School with a B.A. in Commerce and Finance in 1925. He later studied Economics and Political Science at the University of London.

== Career ==
During his distinguished career, Bennett became the first President of the ZCMI Department Store that was not also president of the LDS church. He would later serve as President of the National Retail Merchants Association. He also served as trustee of the National Committee for Economic Development. He would also serve on the board of directors for Zions Bank, Deseret Book, and LDS Hospital.

While in England, Bennett studied music with F.C. Field-Hyde who encouraged him (in vain) to pursue a career in music. He however would go on to sing with the Salt Lake Oratorio Society, with the Mormon Tabernacle Choir, with the Utah Symphony, among others. Racquet sports were among his many other talents. He held state championship titles in tennis, badminton, and squash.

== Personal life ==
Bennett died at his home on December 1, 1999, less than a year short of his 100th birthday.
