= George E. Wahlen VA Medical Center =

George E. Wahlen VA Hospital
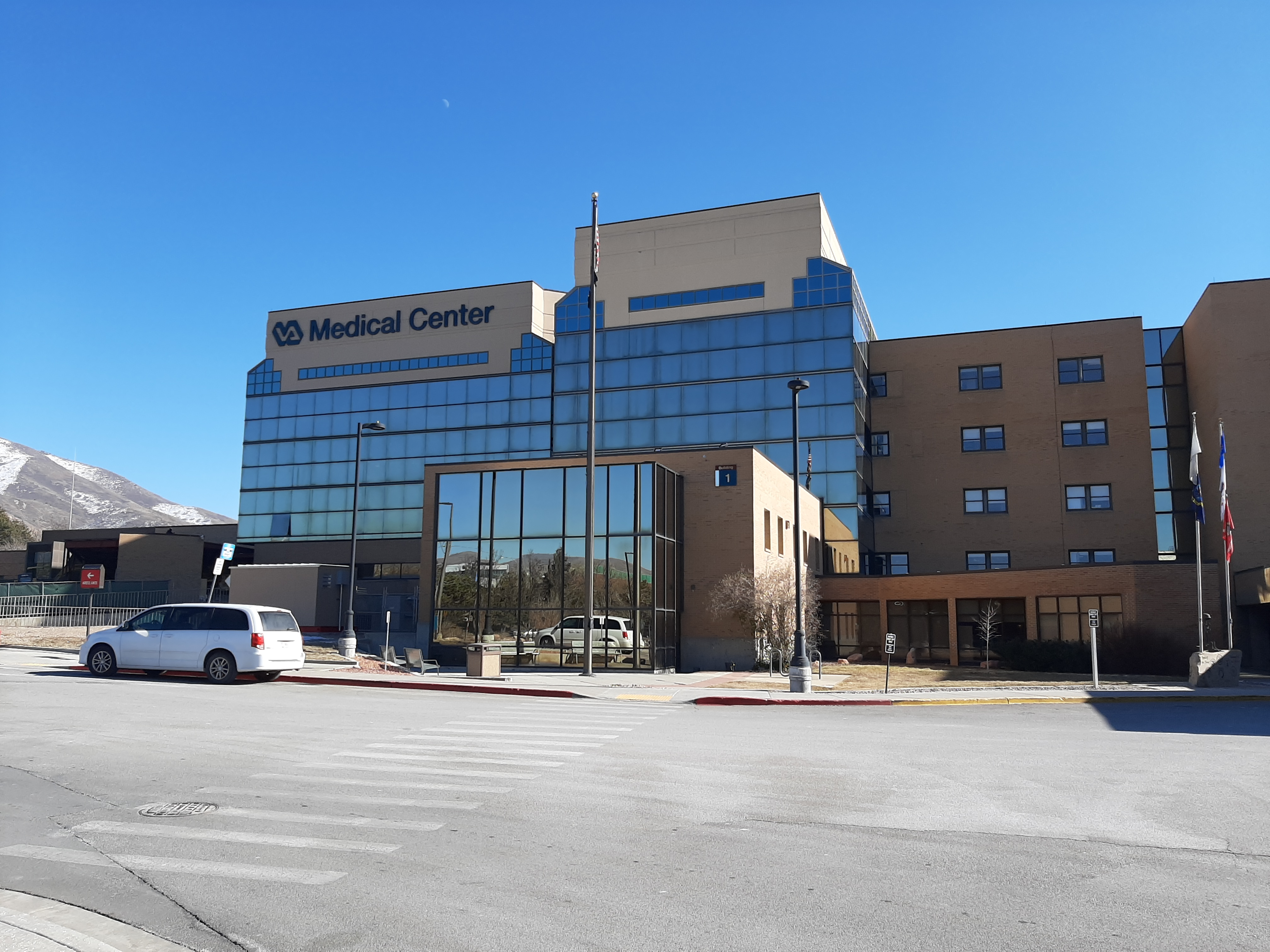
- View of building 1 of the George E. Wahlen VAMC, adjacent from emergency department

- Location within Utah Location within the United States

Geography
- Location: Salt Lake City, Utah, United States
- Coordinates: 40°45′28.52″N 111°50′23.16″W

Organization
- Affiliated university: University of Utah College of Medicine

Services
- Emergency department: Yes
- Beds: 121

History
- Opened: September 4th, 1952

Links
- Website: https://www.va.gov/salt-lake-city-health-care/
- Lists: Hospitals in Utah

The George E. Wahlen Veterans Affairs Medical Center (VAMC) is located in Salt Lake City, Utah, and is a part of the VA Salt Lake City Healthcare System. The George E. Wahlen VA Hospital is a 121-bed short-term acute care hospital and is designated as a medical training and research facility. For the scale of operations in 2021, the George E. Wahlen VA had 2,739 employees, treated 72,303 veterans, and accommodated nearly 703,109 outpatient visits. As of 2021, of the veterans treated here, 31,786 served in the Persian Gulf, 27,029 served in the Vietnam War, 803 in World War II, 2,911 served in the Korean War, and 5,519 were women. During 2021, the George E. Wahlen VA federal budget allocation was over $743 million. The George E. Wahlen Medical Center is one of only five Veterans Affairs heart transplant centers in the United States. The facility is encompassed within the Veterans Integrated Service Network 19 (VISN 19) within the Rocky Mountain Region.

== History ==
The VA Salt Lake City Healthcare System has provided medical services to veterans beginning in 1932. The original structure was located on 12th avenue and E street in Salt Lake City, and had 104 medical beds. During and after World War II, demand increased substantially for the facility's services, which necessitated relocation to a new hospital structure. During September 1946, President Harry S. Truman gave authorization for the construction of a 500-bed hospital near Salt Lake City, on what is now Fort Douglas. On January 11, 1948, ownership of the land at Fort Douglas was transferred to the Veterans Administration.

On September 4, 1952, the newly constructed VA hospital began treating veterans. Following the expansion, the original VA hospital continued to see veterans until 1962. After the new hospital's opening, the University of Utah's college of Medicine entered in academic partnership with the VA medical center. In years following, the hospital expanded this partnership to include the departments of psychology and social work. The new 546-bed hospital specialized in the care of veterans from Utah and other nearby states including Idaho, Wyoming, and Colorado, and specialized in treating psychiatric disorders. During the fall of 1961, the hospital began training nurses in psychiatry, general medicine, and surgery – in collaboration with the College of Nursing at the University of Utah.

== Hospital Designation ==
In 2004, legislation was finalized by U.S. president George W. Bush officially renaming the Salt Lake Veterans Affairs Medical Center to the George E. Wahlen Department of Veterans Affairs Medical Center. Typically, U.S. federal buildings cannot be named for a living person, though George E. Wahlen was still alive. Thus, the renaming required congressional approval for special legislation. George E. Wahlen earned the Medal of Honor in 1945 as a U.S. Navy Corpsman at the Battle of Iwo Jima, sustaining three injuries and mitigating further loss of life in combat. Wahlen re-enlisted in the U.S. Army where he served in the Korean and Vietnam Wars, retiring with the rank of major.

== Accreditation ==
The George E. Wahlen VA facility has received accreditation from the Joint Commission, the American Psychological Association, and the American Society of Health System Pharmacists.

== Services ==
The Salt Lake City VA Healthcare facility provides services between the George E. Wahlen VA in Salt Lake City, and ten outpatient clinics throughout the Wasatch Front. Provided services range from broad medical and mental health care to orthopedics, prosthetics and dental services. In addition to the main hospital, outpatient facilities and ancillary structures, there is a 72-bed transitional housing facility for veterans (Valor House); and a home for families of veterans receiving treatment (Fisher House) who live a qualifying distance away from the VA campus.

== Research and Development ==
The George E. Wahlen VAMC is designated as a research and development hospital. Major research areas include post-traumatic stress disorder (PTSD); Traumatic Brain Injury (TBI); Orthopedics and Prosthetics; Chronic Obstructive Pulmonary Disease (COPD); Amyotrophic Lateral Sclerosis (ALS); Cancer; Diabetes; Cardiovascular Disease; and Rheumatoid Arthritis
