= Veterans Administration Hospital (Salt Lake City) =

Historic building in Salt Lake City, Utah, U.S.

- U.S. National Register of Historic Places
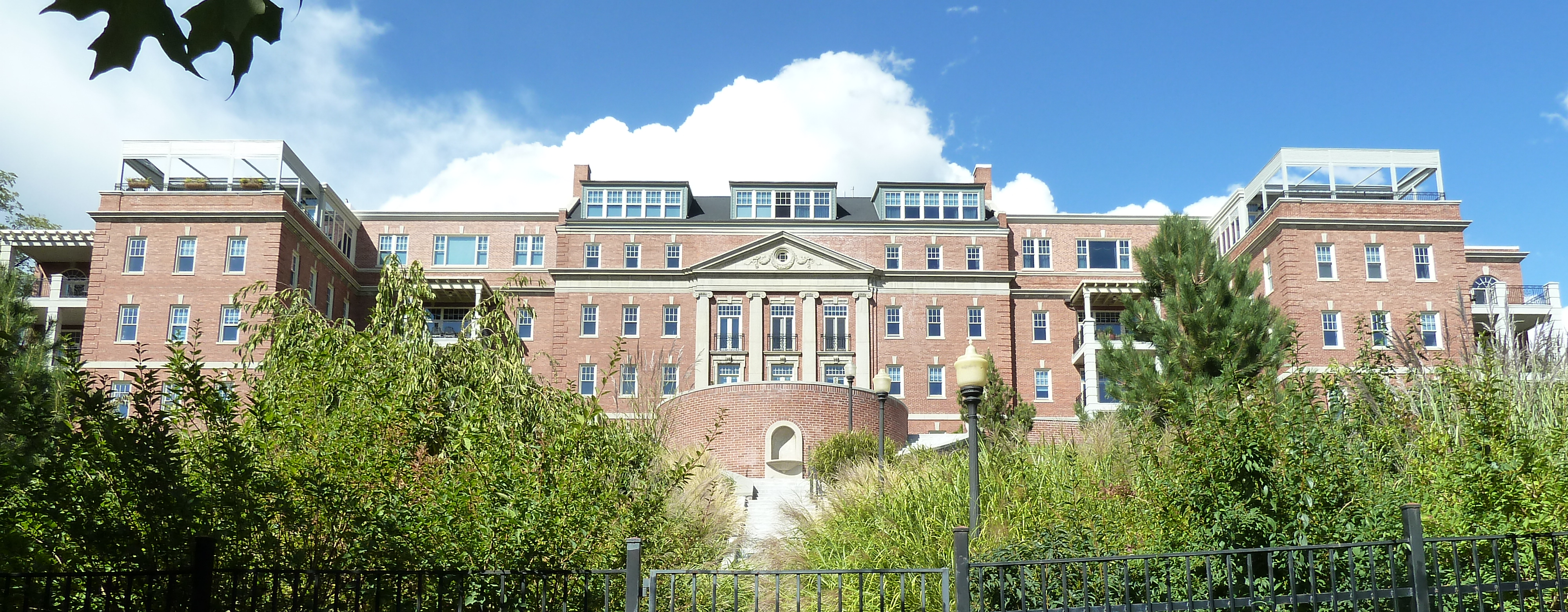
- The former hospital building in 2014

- Location within Utah
- Location: 401 E 12th Avenue; Salt Lake City, Utah, United States
- Coordinates: 40°47′3″N 111°52′39″W
- Built: 1931–1932
- NRHP reference No.: 96000630
- Added to NRHP: June 16, 1996

The Veterans Administration Hospital is a historic hospital building in the Avenues neighborhood of Salt Lake City, Utah, which has been repurposed as condominiums.

Opened in 1932, the hospital was part of the Veterans Administration (VA) system. In 1952, another VA hospital—today known as the George E. Wahlen VA Medical Center—opened in the city. Both hospitals continued to operate concurrently until 1962, when the functions of the 1932 hospital were moved to the newer complex.

In 1964, the building was sold to Zions Securities Corporation and was used for a variety of purposes, including as the Primary Children's Hospital Annex and the BYU Salt Lake Center. In 1995, the hospital building was sold to developers who remodeled it into the Meridien Condos. The building was added to the National Register of Historic Places in 1996.

== History ==
Ground was broken for construction of the hospital in July 1931. The first patient, Oliver J. Hunter, was accepted in July 1932 and an official dedication of the facility was held on July 24, 1932. The building was completed at a cost of $450,000 (equivalent to $10,618,902 in 2025) and included 103 hospital beds.

In April 1940, the addition of a connected west annex building was completed, which housed the administrative offices and recreational facilities. Spaces in the original hospital building that had originally held those functions were then remodeled, allowing for an additional 51 beds.

=== Closure and reuse ===
In September 1952, a new VA Hospital was opened in Salt Lake City (today known as the George E. Wahlen VA Medical Center). The new 546-bed hospital was located on former Fort Douglas property, and initially was to house neuro-psychiatric treatment, tuberculosis treatment, along with neurological disorders and women veterans, while the older 1932 hospital was to remain open as a general medical and surgical hospital. Both hospitals continued to operate until February 1962, when all patients in the older hospital were transferred to the new complex, leaving only the VA's research functions in the 1932 structure.

In November 1964, the federal government sold the empty hospital to Zions Securities Corporation (ZSC), a real estate investment company affiliated with the Church of Jesus Christ of Latter-day Saints (LDS Church). ZSC made a payment of $25,000 (equivalent to $259,523 in 2025) and traded two properties (including one next to the federal building) in exchange for the former hospital. Under the control of the church, parts of the hospital were used in various ways; this included use by the City Board of Health, the west addition became a neuropsychiatric center for Primary Children's Hospital in 1965 (a number of functions of the children's hospital, which was located nearby, were housed in the former VA hospital, leading to it sometimes having the name Primary Children's Hospital Annex), and was home to the BYU Salt Lake Center from 1973 until 1986.

On April 1, 1975, the LDS Church transferred its private hospital system, including Primary Children's Hospital, to the newly created Intermountain Health Care. However, the church retained the old veterans hospital and a number of buyers, including Intermountain Health, expressed desires to purchase the property. By 1978, the church was considering to remodel or replace the veterans hospital for use by BYU's health sciences, and successfully protested efforts by the city and state to list the building as a historic landmark.

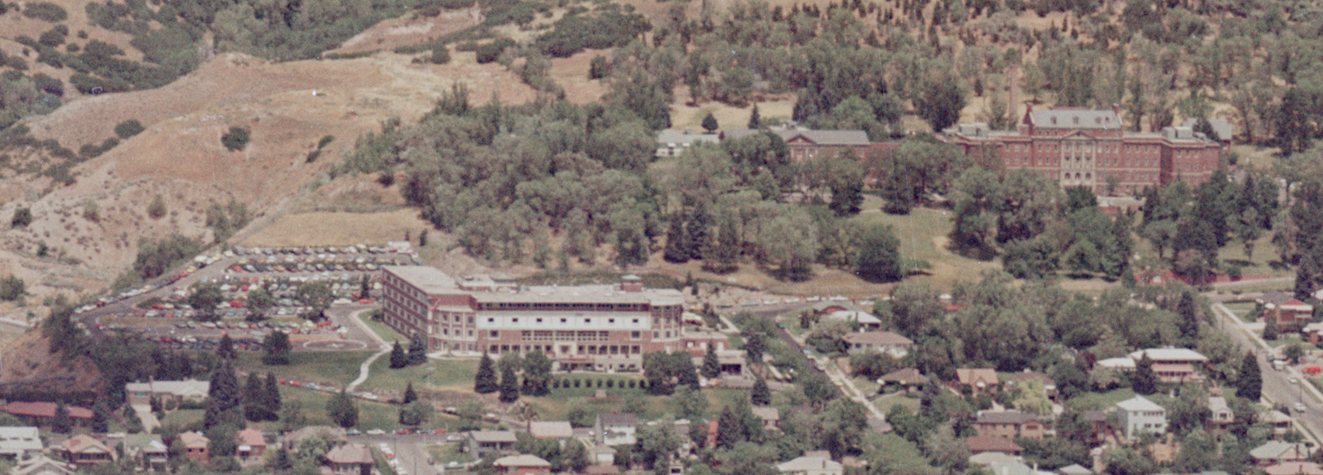
The 1952 Primary Children's Hospital at left, with the 1932 Veterans Hospital at right, photograph taken in 1978

The church sold the old hospital building to Intermountain Health in December 1987, which continued to use it as part of Primary Children's Hospital. When the children's hospital was moved to a new building on the University of Utah's campus in 1990, the old veterans hospital was left vacant. Intermountain Health sold, in 1995, both the former Primary Children's Hospital and veterans hospital buildings to two development companies – Capitol Park Development and Park City Construction, who planned to knock down the children's hospital and construct new homes on its footprint, while renovating the veterans hospital into condominiums. The veterans hospital building was added to the National Register of Historic Places on June 16, 1996.

Park City Construction (unable to start the remodel) sold the old veterans hospital to Pembroke Capitol Park in 2004, which soon after gutted the structure and began constructing new condominiums inside the remaining building shell. The condo complex was named "Meridien" after a mountain peak located north of the city.

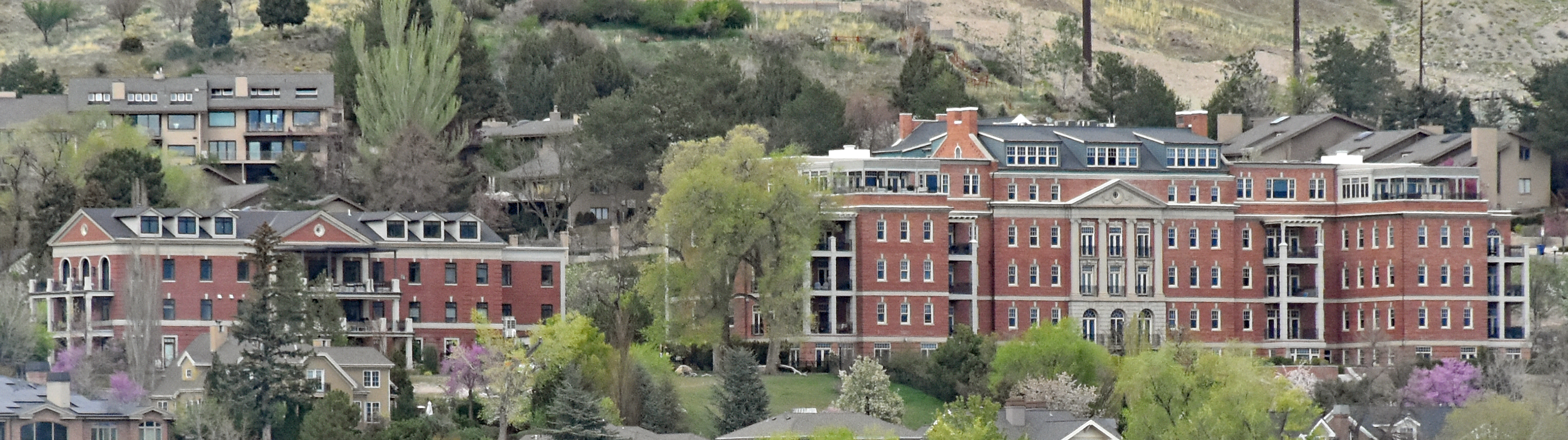
The historic building after its conversion to condos

== See also ==
- National Register of Historic Places listings in Salt Lake City
