= Wild Bill Hickman =

American frontiersman and territorial politician (1815–1883)

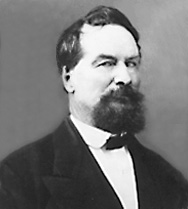
- Hickman c. 1860
- Born: William Adams Hickman; April 16, 1815
- Died: August 21, 1883 (aged 68)

William Adams "Wild Bill" Hickman (April 16, 1815 – August 21, 1883) was an American frontiersman. He also served as a representative to the Utah Territorial Legislature and wrote a public confession to committing several murders which he claimed were under orders from Church of Jesus Christ of Latter Day Saints prophet Brigham Young.

== Early life ==
Hickman was born in Warren County, Kentucky. When he was four years old he moved with his parents to the Missouri Territory, two years before Missouri statehood. He married his first wife, Bernetta Burchartt on 30 August 1832 at 17 years old.

== Latter Day Saint ==
While living in Missouri, Hickman encountered members of the Church of Jesus Christ of Latter Day Saints traveling from Kirtland, Ohio to their new gathering place in Clay County, Missouri and ultimately agreed to be baptized into the religion in 1838.

Upon the killing of Joseph Smith in 1844, he and many other Mormons followed Brigham Young westward into Mexican territory. During this period Hickman began to practice polygamy under the instruction of Brigham Young, marrying Sarah Elizabeth Luce as his second wife in January 1846.

== Utah colonization and conflict ==
In the spring of 1848, Hickman moved to an encampment in Iowa called Council Bluffs where he performed what he would later call "my first act of violence under the rule of Brigham Young" in tracking down and killing a Native American who had threatened the prophet.

The Latter-day Saints traveled westward through Native territory, where Hickman claims to have committed several other murders against Native Americans he and his co-religionists happened across before finally arriving in Salt Lake City in 1849 where he started a homestead ten miles south of the city proper.

Early the following year, in 1850, tensions in Utah Valley between Mormon colonists and the native Timpanogos people had been increasing. Ultimately the murder of a native man led to the Timpanogos taking Mormon cattle as an informal weregild. In response to this insult, the Mormon militia was raised, and Hickman joined them in what would come to be known as the Provo River Massacre. During the course of violence, Hickman records killing the chief of the band, Old Elk, whose head he removed with his Bowie knife and which he brought back to Fort Utah and hung from the walls. The massacre ultimately killed around 50 Timpanogos men and the surviving women and children were taken and sold as slaves to church members.

== Rising tensions with the gentiles ==
In 1852, the Mormon-controlled Utah legislature passed a law granting Mormons the preferred right to run ferries over the Green River, increasing tensions with the Mountain Men who associated with Fort Bridger, who had been running the ferries over the river. Rumors began swirling that Jim Bridger was arming Native groups in the area, and affidavits were drawn up to that effect. Hickman was sent along with a posse of 150 Mormon militia who killed a couple of the mountain men and stole several hundred head of stock and whiskey they found at the fort, although Jim Bridger himself was not there.

In April 1854, fearing retribution by the mountain men or allied Native bands, Hickman was asked by Young to go to Green River and establish a ferry under church ownership. Hickman found the area to be overrun by ferries, along with a growing uneasiness between Mormon ferrymen and mountain men. Instead, Hickman established a prosperous trading post at Pacific Springs near South Pass, 26 miles (42 km) east of Green River. Hickman was appointed sheriff and county prosecuting attorney, assessor and collector by Judge Appleby in 1854 at Fort Supply, twelve miles south of Fort Bridger. In August 1854, Hickman was elected to the Utah Territorial Legislature for the area of Green River.

On February 8, 1856, Hickman, along with Porter Rockwell, and at the request of Brigham Young, carried the mail from Independence, Missouri, to Salt Lake City. Porter Rockwell carried the mail from Fort Laramie to Salt Lake City, and Hickman from Laramie to Independence. The trip took Hickman nearly four months to complete. Hickman was involved in the Aiken massacre of five travelers in 1857 when he killed Horace Bucklin under direct orders from Young.

Hickman was an important figure in the Utah War. He torched Fort Bridger and numerous supply trains of the Federal Army.

== Break with Brigham Young, excommunication, and later life ==
Hickman, according to his autobiography, first began to break with Brigham Young during the latter's handling of the Morrisite War in 1863, claiming to put his name alongside those of many Utah non-Mormons to an ultimately successful petition to have the surviving prisoners of the minor sect released by a pardon from the (non-Brighamite) territorial governor. This act of minor resistance was followed by a direct confrontation with Brigham Young later in that year, when Hickman claimed that Brigham Young ordered him to murder U.S. Army General Patrick Edward Connor for whom Hickman had been acting as a scout. Hickman later said he had refused the order, saying "it shan't be done; I will see to that myself". Hickman's work as a scout for the hated U.S. Army may have been what ultimately turned Brigham Young and his former co-religionists against him. Following a series of legal complaints by the local Probate Court, which was a church-run alternative legal system particular to the Utah Territory, he spent time in jail, upon release finding out that much of his property had been expropriated by his neighbors at the behest of their local bishop and, as he was a practicing polygamist, his many wives and children encouraged to leave him".

With armed men hounding his movements and his family dissolving, Hickman resolved to leave Utah in fear for his life. He spent the next several years mining in California and Nevada.". In 1868 while Hickman was still in California his Taylorsville, Utah Bishop excommunicated him from the LDS Church, and with his plural marriages no longer being in force, ultimately nine of his ten wives would leave him.

Around September 1871, the now estranged Hickman confessed to murdering Richard Yates and stated it was at the request of Brigham Young. This was under interrogation by Deputy Marshal H. Gilson, who was attempting to make a case against Brigham Young for ordering murders across the territory. He was held at Fort Douglas and guarded by the military for his safety, and he gave testimony to a Grand Jury about crimes he had committed and seen committed under the instruction of Brigham Young. While at Fort Douglas, he wrote his autobiography, which was later given to J. H. Beadle who performed some basic fact-checking and ultimately published it under the title Brigham's Destroying Angel.

Nothing ever became of the case against Young, who died in 1877. Hickman, who had struck a deal with federal law enforcement to testify against Young if he were ever to be brought to trial, was never convicted of the crimes to which he confessed. He ultimately left Utah, dying in the Wind River Mountains in western Wyoming in August 1883.

== Family ==
Hickman had ten wives. He married his first wife, Bernetta Burchartt on 30 August 1832, second wife was Sarah Elizabeth Luce, married on 30 January 1846. Third wife was Minerva Emma Wade, married on 1 May 1849. Fourth wife was Sarah Basford Meacham, married 18 August 1850. Fifth wife was Hannah Diantha Horr, married 11 September 1853. Sixth wife was recorded only as an "Indian woman" and seventh wife was Sarah Eliza Johnson, married to both women on 28 March 1855. Eighth wife was Mary Lucretia Horr, married in March 1856. Ninth wife was Martha Diana Case Howland, married 2 November 1856, and his tenth wife was Mary Jane Hetherington, married on 21 June 1859. Online genealogical records of the LDS Church show he fathered 36 children. Another source lists 39.

Hickman was the grandfather of author Annalee Skarin. Hickman was also the grandfather (through Minerva Emma Wade) of the artist Minerva Teichert. His is also the great-great-grandfather of speculative fiction author Tracy Hickman.

He died in Lander, Wyoming in 1883.

Hickman was re-baptized by proxy into the LDS Church on May 5, 1934.

== Legacy ==
- East Hickman Canyon, Tooele County, Utah
- East Hickman Canyon Road, Tooele County, Utah
- Hickman Canyon, Piute County, Utah
- Hickman Creek, Tooele County, Utah
- Hickman Knolls, Tooele County, Utah
- Hickman Natural Bridge (Arch), Capitol Reef National Park, Wayne County, Utah
- Hickman Pass, Tooele County, Utah
- Hickman Pasture, Wayne County, Utah
- Hickman Spring, Wayne County, Utah
- Indian Hickman Canyon, Tooele, Utah

== Works ==
- Brigham's destroying angel : being the life, confession, and startling disclosures of the notorious Bill Hickman, the Danite chief of Utah, Geo A. Crofutt, New York - 1872
