= First National Bank (Salt Lake City) =

Historic building in Salt Lake City, Utah, U.S.

- U.S. National Register of Historic Places
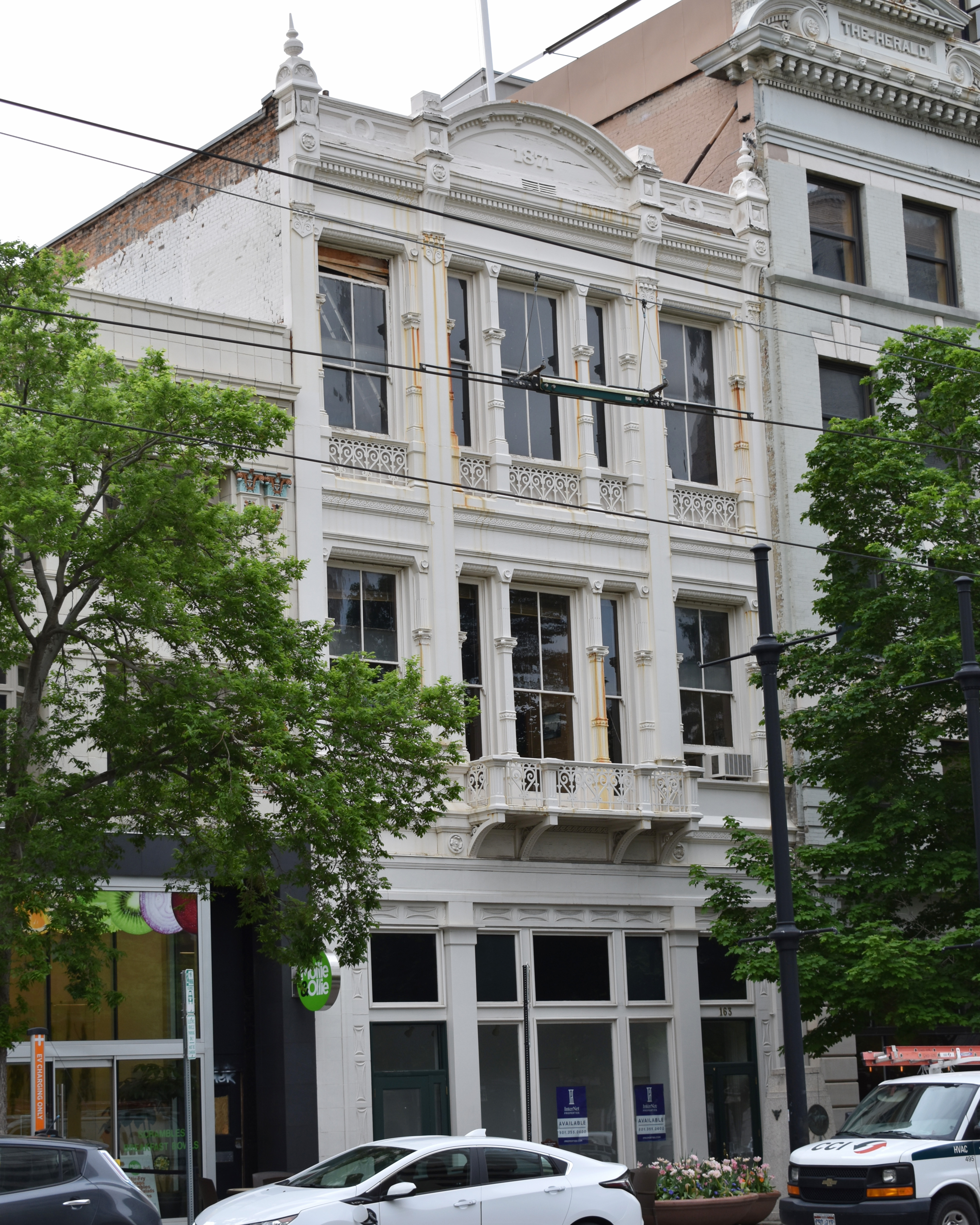
- First National Bank, May 2019

- Location within Utah Location within the United States
- Location: 163 South Main Street, Salt Lake City, Utah; United States
- Coordinates: 40°45′56″N 111°53′24″W
- Area: less than one acre
- Built: 1871
- Architect: Thomas J. Thompson; Richard M. Upjohn
- NRHP reference No.: 76001825
- Added to NRHP: May 24, 1976

The First National Bank is a historic bank building in downtown Salt Lake City, Utah, United States, that is listed on the National Register of Historic Places (NRHP).

== Description ==
The building is a 3-story commercial building designed by Thomas J. Thomson and Richard M. Upjohn and constructed in 1873. Originally four stories, the building lost its top floor to fire in 1875. The building has one of only two cast iron facades in the city, the other visible at the Z.C.M.I. Building. The First National Bank was added to the NRHP May 24, 1976.

== Early history ==
Construction began on the First National Bank building in 1872 after demolition of the Commerce Building on East Temple Street. East Temple Street was renamed Main Street in 1906. The building featured a cast iron facade that was assembled as quickly as it arrived. Bank president Warren Hussey became the sole owner of the building and the bank in December, 1872. The building opened in September, 1873.

An early description of the building and its ornate decorations was printed in The Daily Graphic:

This edifice has a frontage of thirty-five feet, is a hundred feet deep, and has a total height of a hundred and ten feet. The sides and rear wall are of brick and stone, twenty-five inches thick, and were built by the master mason now erecting the new City Hall in San Francisco. The entire front is of iron from the Architectural Iron Works, New York.

The bank occupies the entire first floor, and is unquestionably the finest bank in the United States, if not the world. It is a perfect gem of beauty and art. The roof is heavily paneled with black walnut facings and rich carved mouldings. The ceiling proper is in rough plaster and painted in Coburg blue, with a fine centre and a band skirting the mouldings, painted in the richest colors of the Pompeian style. This painting and the frescoing of the walls were done by artists sent from Broadway, New York. The counter is constructed entirely of marble, six or seven different kinds--American and European--classified in the sweetest harmony of colors, and cost $10,000.

The cabinet-work over it is of excellent design, and the carving is of the rich old baronial times. The floor is in ornamental tile. Everything bespeaks wealth and art, and reflects the highest credit upon the eminent architect, R.M. Upjohns, of New York.

The basement of the bank is occupied by the Stock Exchange, and the upper stories are already occupied as mining bureaus and law offices. The whole building and its occupancy indicate more than anything that we have yet heard from Utah of the great change that has come to the Mormon community, and the direction in which the future of that Territory is travelling.

This fine building has cost $125,000, and was opened to commerce on the 1st instant; Warren Hussey, President; Anthony Godbe, Cashier; with a cash capital and surplus of $250,000, and the privilege of increasing it to $500,000. It has a deposit account of half a million, and has paid fifty per cent dividends for several years.

— "The New Bank in Utah", The Daily Graphic (September 15, 1873)

The Salt Lake Herald offered similar descriptions of the beautiful new building, but its opening coincided with the Panic of 1873, and depositors remained skeptical. Almost immediately the bank suspended payment on checks, citing a lack of currency. Reopening a month later, the bank operated for a year, and it soon received $30,000 in currency. However, the bank closed in November, 1874, and its building became the property of the Walker Brothers. John C. Ball was appointed receiver.

Deseret National Bank opened temporary offices in the building in June, 1875. In November a fire destroyed the top floor and damaged adjacent buildings.

== See also ==
- National Register of Historic Places listings in Salt Lake City
