= ZCMI Cast Iron Front =

Historic building façade in Salt Lake City, Utah, U.S.

- Z.C.M.I. Cast Iron Front
- U.S. National Register of Historic Places
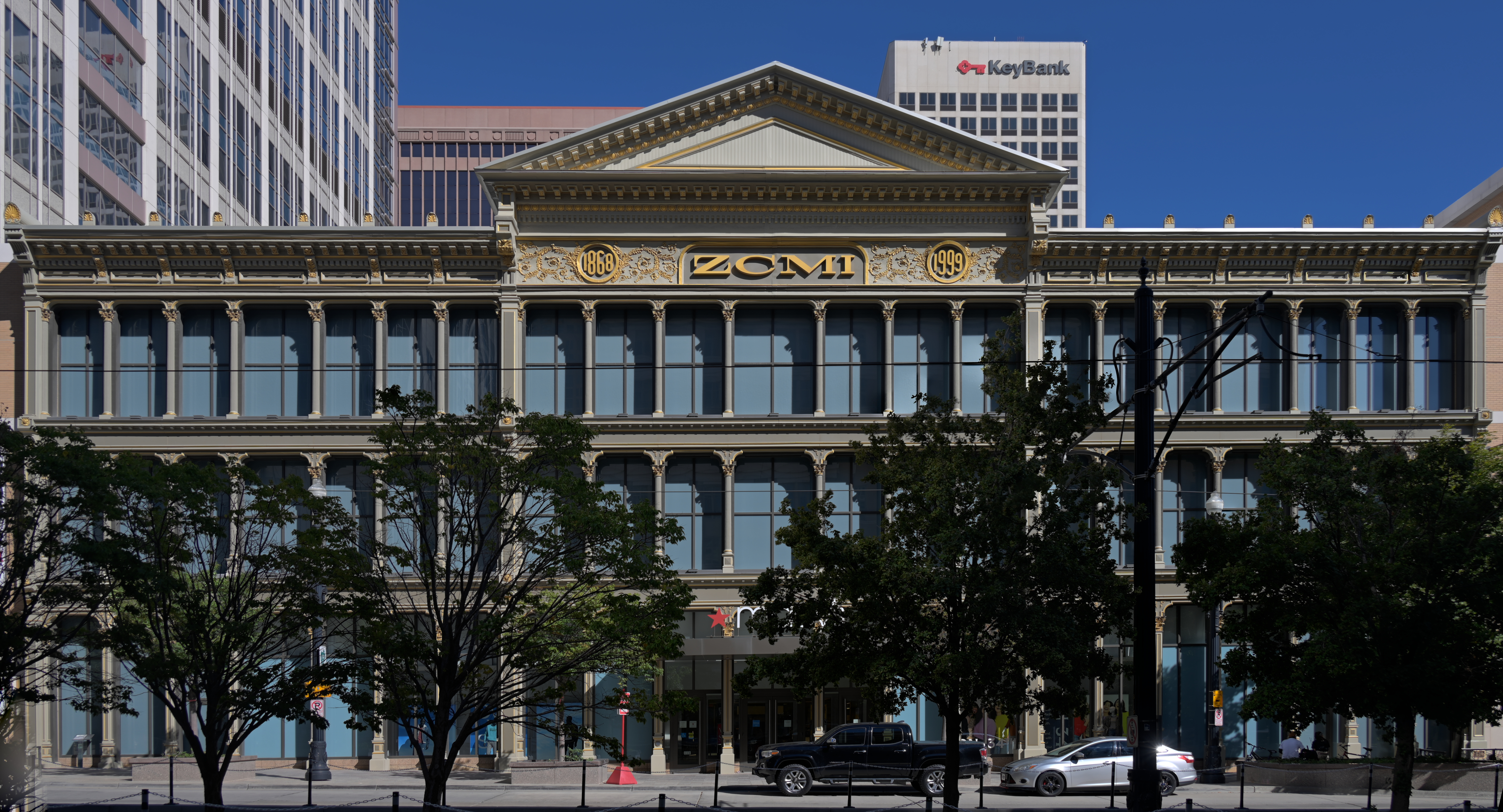
- The façade in September 2023

- Location within Utah Location within the United States
- Location: 15 South Main Street; Salt Lake City, Utah; United States
- Coordinates: 40°46′07″N 111°53′27″W
- Built: 1876
- Architect: William H. Folsom, Obed Taylor
- NRHP reference No.: 70000632
- Added to NRHP: September 22, 1970

The ZCMI Cast Iron Front is a historic building façade, currently attached to City Creek Center facing Main Street in downtown Salt Lake City, Utah, United States. The façade, built of cast iron and stamped sheet metal between 1876 and 1901 (with portions recreated in the 1970s), is a well-preserved example of a metal façade, and a reminder of the city's 19th-century commercial past. It was listed on the National Register of Historic Places in 1970.

First attached to the Zion's Co-operative Mercantile Institution (ZCMI) building, it was removed when that structure was razed in the 1970s, after which it was restored and attached to the ZCMI Center Mall. In the 2010s, it was then attached to City Creek Center when that development replaced the older mall.

== Design ==
The façade is three stories in height, and is divided into three sections, articulated by square columns between them and at the ends. Each section is about 50 feet (15 m) wide and each is composed of seven bays, separated by paneled columns with Corinthian capitals. Above the first two floors there are modillioned cornices separating the floors, with a deeper projecting cornice at the roof level. The roof cornice of the outer levels is further adorned with a layer of dentil work below the modillions, and has brackets above each of the columns. The middle section cornice includes a fully pedimented gable and is raised above a frieze panel with vine motifs around two circular panels with the dates 1868 and 1999, and a central panel bearing the legend ZCMI.

== History ==
ZCMI was founded in October 1868, and is described as the first department store in the United States. Its flagship store for many decades was opened in downtown Salt Lake City on April 1, 1876. This 1876 building was designed by local architects William H. Folsom and Obed Taylor, and at first featured only the central portion of the façade, which was fashioned out of cast iron. During two building expansions, occurring in 1880 and 1901, the façade was extended, the first time also in cast iron, the second time in stamped sheet metal.

In May 1969, ZCMI's owner, the Church of Jesus Christ of Latter-day Saints (LDS Church), announced plans to develop a shopping mall to replace ZCMI's ageing downtown buildings. These plans called for maintaining the "spirit and semblance" of the historic façade, while demolishing the buildings behind it. This included either saving and restoring the façade, or fabricating a new one made to look like the original. The possibly of a replacement rather than restoration caused a furor in the community.

The owners brought in local architect, Steven T. Baird, who determined there was enough historic fabric remaining that the façade could be restored rather than replaced; a process he would oversee. In October 1973, disassembly of the façade began. The pieces were inspected and multiple layers of paint removed. Since the northern section had been made of sheet metal, a cast iron replacement was created, which also afforded the opportunity to match it with the proportions of the other sections. The restoration also required that the first story of the façade be recast, as it had largely been obliterated when the front was modernized with larger windows. The façade was then reconstructed, in approximately its original location, on the face of the new ZCMI store at the ZCMI Center Mall, with the project completing in 1976. The façade's placement on a steel frame, slightly away from the mall structure, created a loggia.

In October 2006, the church announced it would be tearing down the ZCMI Center Mall and replacing it with a new mixed-use development called City Creek Center. While City Creek Center was built, the façade was dismantled and stored. Following reconditioning by Historical Arts & Casting, Inc., it was reassembled from 2010 to 2011, and City Creek Center opened in March 2012. It is currently attached to the west face of Macy's department store, in the same general location as the original.

== Visual evolution ==
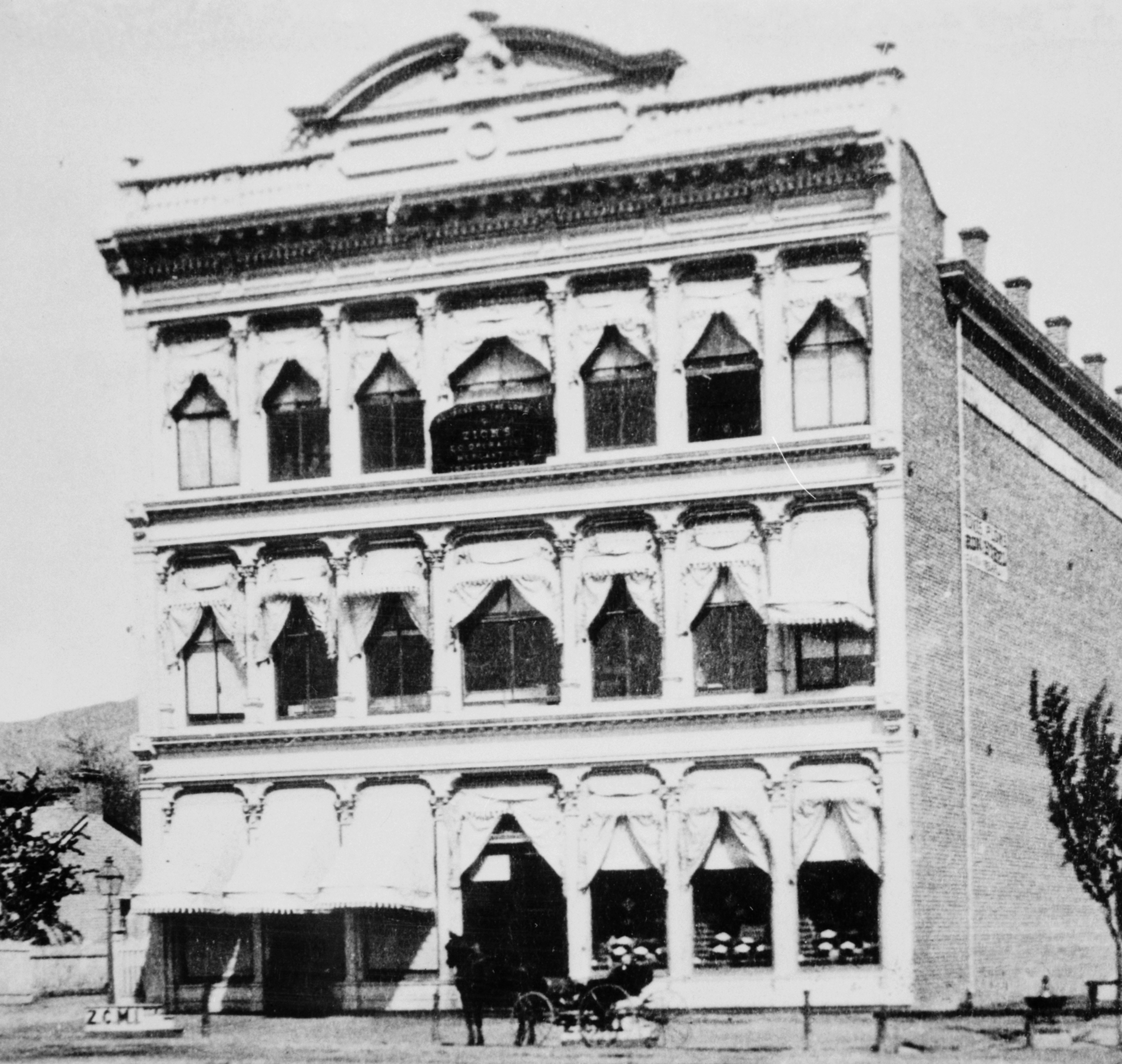
Original façade, circa 1876

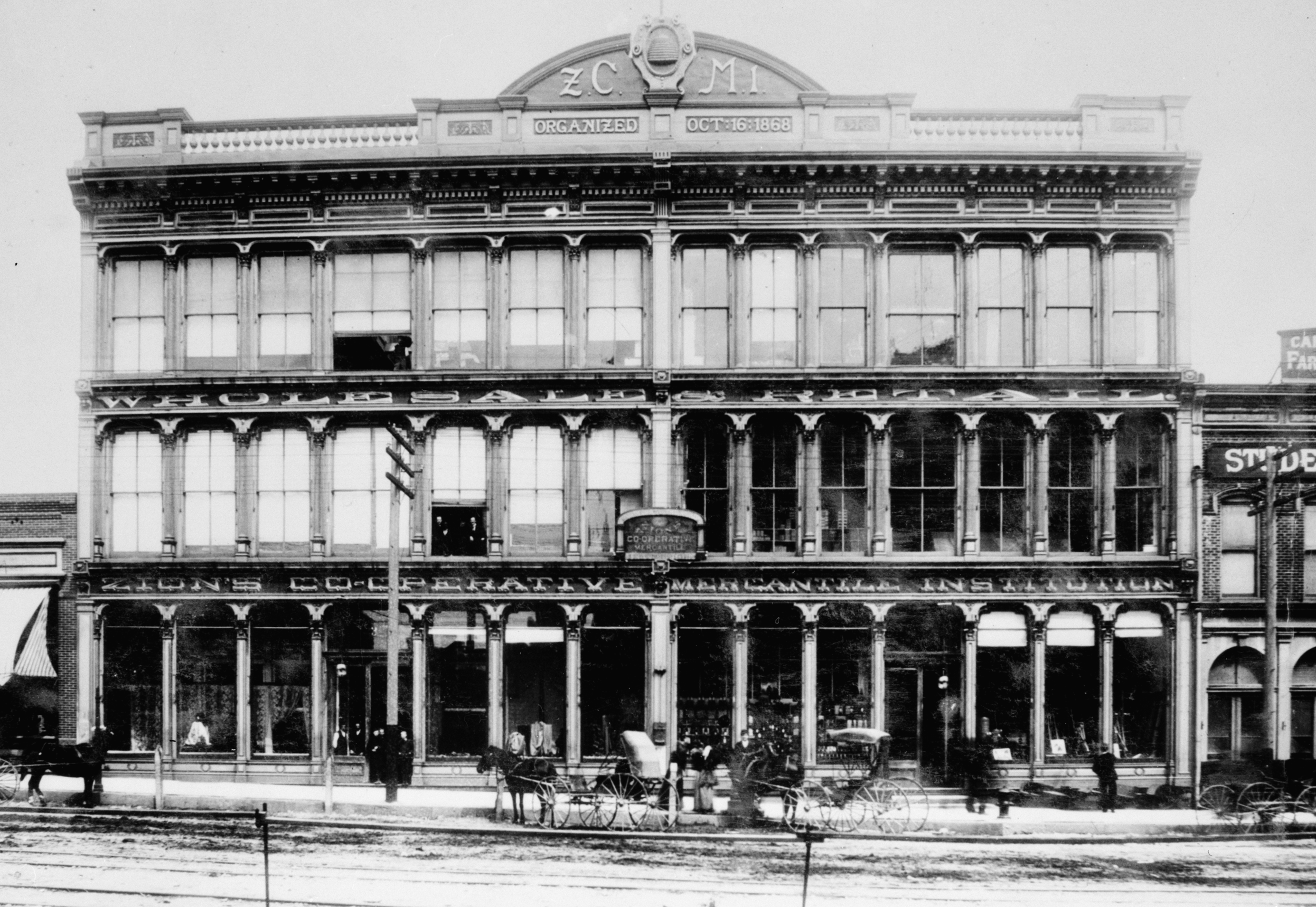
After 1880 south addition

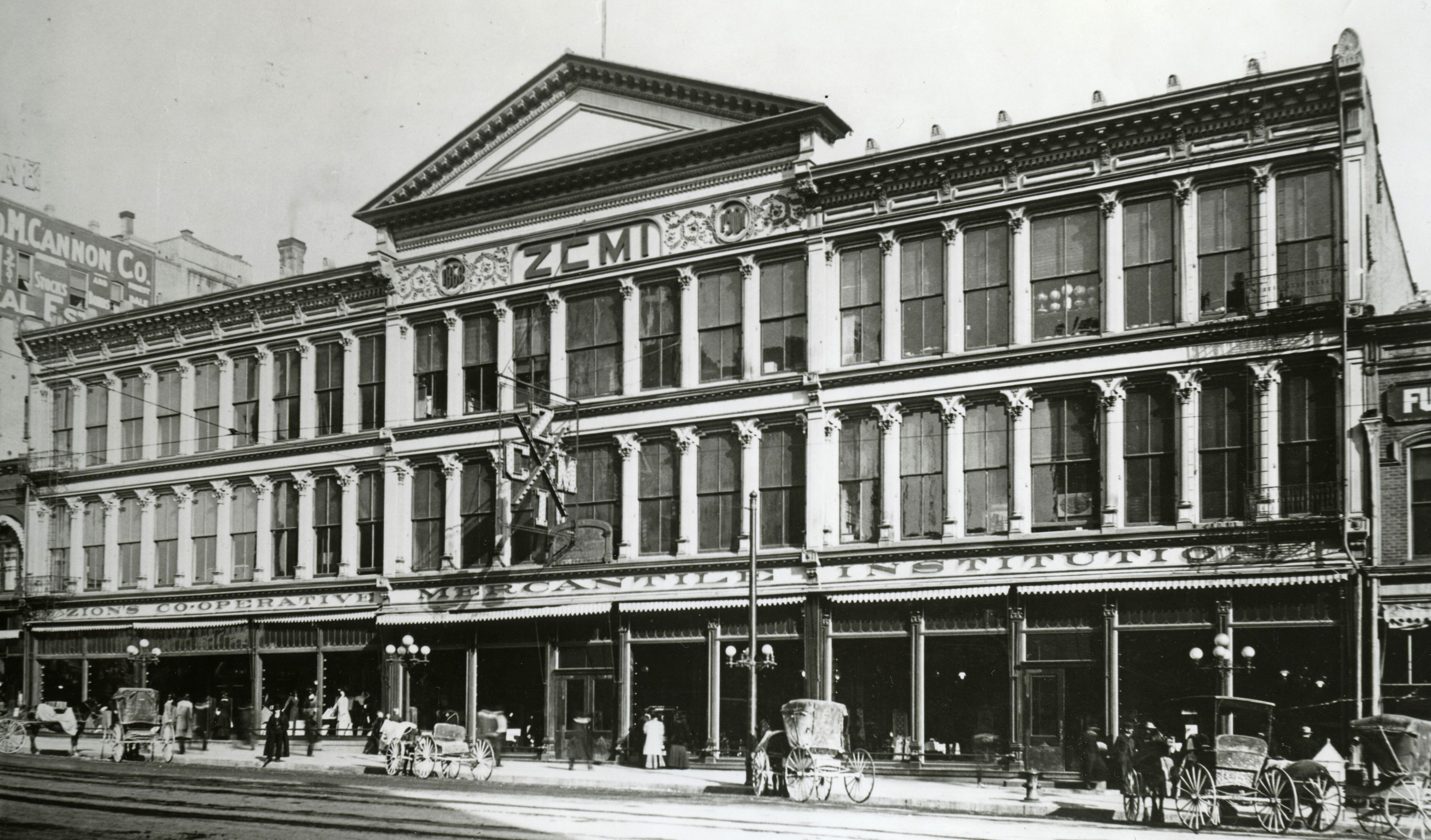
After 1901 north addition

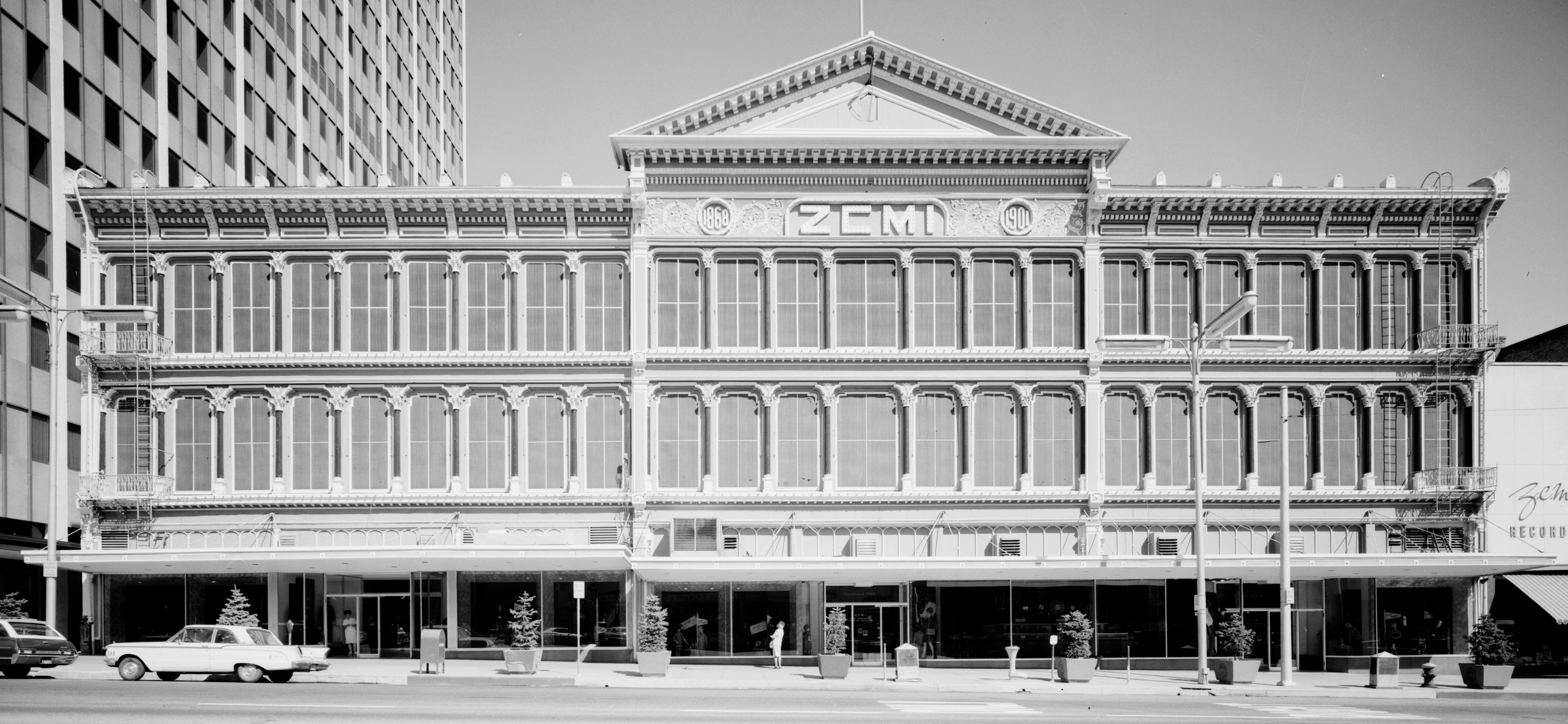
After modernization of first story, as seen in 1967

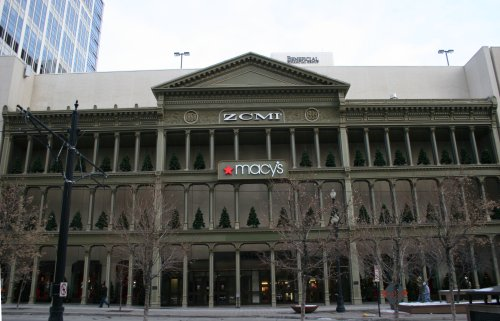
Placement on the ZCMI Center Mall, as seen in 2006

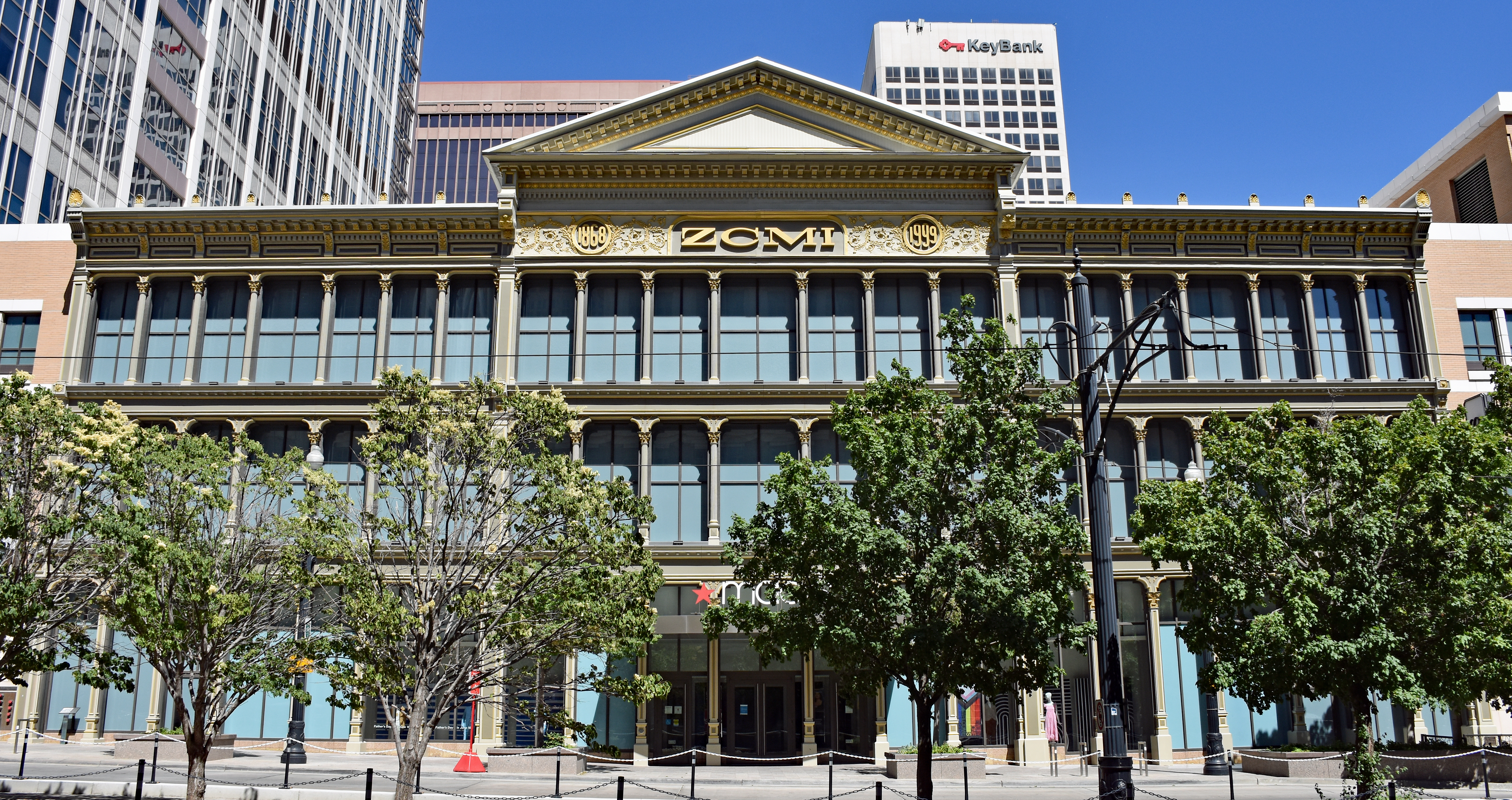
Placement on City Creek Center, as seen in 2024

== See also ==
- First National Bank (Salt Lake City, Utah), with the only other cast-iron façade in the city
- National Register of Historic Places listings in Salt Lake City
