= Nielsen's Frozen Custard =

American dessert chain

- Company type: Private
- Industry: Dessert
- Founded: 1981
- Founder: Steve Nielsen; Debbie Nielsen
- Headquarters: Bountiful, Utah
- Number of locations: 11 (2024)
- Area served: Nevada; Utah
- Owner: Nielsen family
- Website: nielsensfrozencustard.com

Nielsen's Frozen Custard is an American chain of dessert restaurants mainly serving frozen custard. Founded in 1981, it has eleven locations in Utah and Nevada. It was the first frozen custard business west of the Mississippi and one of the only sellers of the dessert in the country at the time.

== History ==
The chain was founded in 1981 as Nielsen's Frozen Custard & Diner, by Steve and Debbie Nielsen. Its first location was at the former Crossroads Plaza in Salt Lake City, Utah, and the Nielsens aimed to have a family business to teach their children how to work. In 1983, Steve received a patent from the United States Patent and Trademark Office for a custard-freezing machine he invented.

== Menu ==
All locations have the chain's signature frozen custard (called concretes) available, which are sold in cups or cones. A variety of toppings, including nuts, can also be added. Ice cream floats and sundaes are also offered. Select locations offer meals and contain a diner. The menu for these includes hamburgers, cheeseburgers, grilled cheeses, corn dogs, chicken fingers, submarine sandwiches (called grinders), french fries, and onion rings. The company has a signature fry sauce.

== Locations ==
The chain has eleven locations in Utah and Nevada, with seven locations in the former and four in the latter. All of the Nevada locations are in Clark County. It formerly had a location in Vienna, Virginia, but it closed in 2016. A Rexburg, Idaho, location closed in 2018.
