= Lynn M. Hilton =

American politician (1924–2020)

Lynn Mathers Hilton

District President over Egypt and Sudan

Utah House of Representatives, District 4

In office
- 1973-1975
- Political party: Republican

Military career
- 1943–1945 (World War II)
- Service/branch: United States Army Air Forces
- Rank: Second Lieutenant (as pilot of a B-24 bomber); First Lieutenant in the Air Force Reserve (until 1955)

Personal details
- Born: November 3, 1924; Thatcher, Arizona, U.S.
- Died: August 12, 2020 (aged 95); Brigham City, Utah, U.S.
- Home town: Berkeley and Oakland, California
- Education: Ph.D. in Educational Administration
- Alma mater: University of Chicago; University of Utah
- Employer: Brigham Young University
- Spouse(s): Annalee Hope Avarell (1948–1999); Nancy Goldberg (m. 2001)
- Children: Cynthia, Polly, Sheree, Ralph, and Spencer

Lynn Mathers Hilton (November 3, 1924 – August 12, 2020) was an American politician who served as a member of the Utah State Legislature. He was also known as an academic professor, businessman, Middle East explorer and author of many books related to the Church of Jesus Christ of Latter-day Saints (LDS Church).

== Early life and education ==
Hilton was raised in Berkeley and Oakland, California. He served as a pilot on a B-24 bomber in the United States Army Air Corps during World War II. After leaving the Army at the end of the war, Hilton served as a missionary (1945–47) for LDS Church in the church's New England Mission.

Hilton earned his B.S. and M.S. degrees at the University of Utah; and a Ph.D. in educational administration from the University of Chicago in 1952.

== Career ==
After earning his Ph.D., Hilton became a professor of education at Brigham Young University. He later served as associate dean of continuing education and was the founder of the BYU Salt Lake Center. Also among other things at BYU, Hilton helped to develop the first curriculum for genealogy courses.

Hilton served for one term as a member of the Utah House of Representatives, starting in 1972. In 1974 he ran unsuccessfully as a Republican candidate for the United States Congress.

In 1975 Hilton set up a business drilling wells for water in Egypt. He was also made the District President of The Church of Jesus Christ of Latter-day Saints over Egypt and Sudan at this time and worked for the four years he was in Egypt to try to get the LDS Church recognized by the Egyptian government.

By appointment of the LDS Church's Ensign magazine, Hilton was called to organize an expedition of discovery to find the trail of the Book of Mormon prophet Lehi and his family. The Book of Mormon says that Lehi's group left from Jerusalem in approximately 600 B.C., traveled through the wilderness to the place called Bountiful, and there built a ship in which they sailed to their promised land of America. This expedition was partly funded by the LDS Church. The results of Hilton's discoveries were first published in the Ensign in the September and October 1976 editions. Hilton wrote two books on this subject, In Search of Lehi's Trail and Discovering Lehi. His first wife, Hope, was co-author of each book. In 2008, Hilton published a DVD entitled Lehi's Trail in Arabia, a slide show and narration.

Hilton's first wife was Annalee Hope Averell, daughter of spiritualist author Annalee Skarin. They were married 51 years. They had five children. Hope died in 1999. Two years later he married Nancy Goldberg. They served as missionaries for the LDS Church on five occasions. The first one was to Sydney, Australia, where they served as Regional Employment Directors. The second was a mission in LDS Church headquarters in Salt Lake City, Utah. The third was ten months in Irbid, Jordan, where Hilton was the branch president of the Irbid, Jordan branch; his wife did humanitarian work for the church. On this third mission, they also served eight months as the Directors of the Family History Center in Athens, Greece. The fourth and fifth missions were in New York and Boston respectively, where they performed family history work.

Hilton also wrote The Kolob Theorem: A Mormon's View of God's Starry Universe and The Pearl of Great Price Concordance. Hilton also served as the editor of The Story of the Salt Lake Stake, the Salt Lake Stake's 125th anniversary history; he did this while serving on the Stake's high council. This work was published in 1972. Hilton also compiled an edition of Levi Savage Jr.'s journal. Hilton is a great-grandson of Savage.

=== Excommunication of Annalee Skarin ===
Hope and Lynn Hilton played a central role in the excommunication of Hope's mother and spiritualist author Annalee Skarin in 1952. They submitted a study they had made of her book, Ye Are Gods, to church apostle and president of the Deseret News, Mark E. Petersen. Elder Petersen gave Skarin the choice of renouncing her writing as the work of Satan, or facing excommunication.
