= John C. Swensen =

John C. Swensen (1869–1953) was a professor of sociology at Brigham Young University (BYU) for 54 years and the first athletic director at BYU.

Swenson was born in Pleasant Grove, Utah. He attended high school at Brigham Young Academy and later took college courses there as well. Swensen joined the faculty of BYU in 1898. He was dean of the college division of BYU from 1904 to 1910 (this was when it had just transitioned from being BYA, and the student body still was largely high schoolers). From 1921 to 1925, Swensen served as acting dean of BYU's College of Education. Swensen was the head of BYU's sociology department for 30 years.

Swensen and his wife Margaret Ellen Davis had ten children. Early in his life, Swensen had generally spelled his last name "Swenson", and half his children chose that spelling while the other half chose the "Swensen" spelling.

Swensen was involved in politics. He was a delegate to the Democratic National Convention in 1924 and an alternate delegate in 1936. In the Church of Jesus Christ of Latter-day Saints, Swensen served as a stake high councilor for 23 years.
