= Annalee Skarin =

American LDS mystical writer (1899–1988)

Annalee (Kohlepp) Skarin
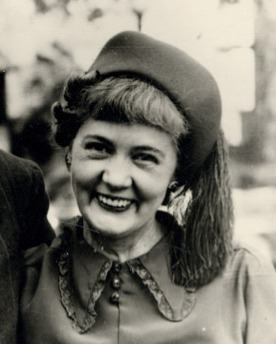
- Born: July 7, 1899; American Falls, Idaho, U.S.
- Died: January 17, 1988 (aged 88); Red Bluff, California, US
- Occupation: Author
- Spouses: William Michael "Mikey" Gorman (m. 1916; ann. 1920); Hugo Joseph Avarell (m. 1922; div. 1943); Reason E. Skarin (m. 1943)
- Children: 4
- Family: "Wild Bill" Hickman (grandfather); Minerva Teichert (sister) Lynn M. Hilton (son-in-law)

Annalee Skarin (born Annalee Kohlepp: July 7, 1899 – January 17, 1988), was an American writer of mysticism and New Age literature, with nine best-selling books. She had been raised as a Latter-day Saint, and her 1948 book Ye Are Gods, with over 18 printings, was popular among some members of The Church of Jesus Christ of Latter-day Saints (LDS Church). The primary claim of the book was the possibility of attaining physical immortality through the ardent pursuit of Christian and ascetic principles. Skarin reports being "translated" to immortality in 1952. The nature of this "translation" is controversial, as she continued to publish in the ensuing decades.

== Early life ==
Skarin was born in American Falls, Idaho, the seventh of twelve children, raised in the "bleak environment" of a dry farm by parents Frederick John Kohlepp and Mary Ella Hickman. Her grandfather was "Wild Bill" Hickman. Annalee's eldest sister, Minerva Teichert, was an accomplished artist with paintings on display in many temples of The Church of Jesus Christ of Latter-day Saints.

Skarin attended the University of Utah for one quarter, was a member of the LDS Church, and served as a missionary in California. She later was a ward Relief Society president and taught drama at her daughters' Catholic elementary school.

Annalee Skarin married William Michael "Mikey" Gorman on July 15, 1916; the marriage was annulled in 1920. Her second marriage, arranged by her mother, was to Hugo Joseph Avarell on August 31, 1922 in Salt Lake City. It ended in divorce after 21 years. In each of these marriages Annalee bore a son who died as a baby. In the second marriage she also had two daughters, Hope and Linda Lee. Her final marriage was to Reason E. Skarin on October 18, 1943 in Buffalo, New York, to whom she had taught the gospel as a missionary.

== Career ==
=== Ye Are Gods ===
Skarin self-published her first book, Ye Are Gods, in 1948. In the book, her daughter Linda Lee was described suffering from a severe illness, and was then healed miraculously. Skarin wrote, "Dear God, this child is Yours first -- and then she is mine. If you want her -- take her -- I love her so! But all that I have is Thine." The book includes religious teachings pursuant to the healing. She wrote: "There was just that intense feeling that something was required of us and we had to find out what it was."

The book's most controversial claim was the possibility of attaining physical immortality through the ardent pursuit of Christian principles, which she summarized as gratitude, praise, and love. She later wrote, "Death is the dreary, backdoor entrance into the other world. It is the servant’s entrance. But there is a great front door of glory for those who OVERCOME."

Correspondence indicates that this initial version was soon followed by a second volume in 1949. She published a new edition in 1952 that combined the two volumes. This edition removed explicit references to the LDS Church but still widely quoted early LDS leaders and scripture.

Skarin sent copies of her books to all the church leaders. In an October 12, 1949 letter to her daughter Hope, she wrote, "From many have come beautiful letters --- the one from President George Albert Smith was filled with love and kindness." She also referred to letters from apostle (later to be President) Spencer W. Kimball and from "Stake, Mission, and Temple Presidents…". In promoting her book, she apparently claimed endorsement by some of these leaders, and was corrected for doing so by Kimball.

Church leaders felt the book had serious doctrinal flaws and her refusal to renounce the principles taught in the book led to her excommunication.

=== Excommunication ===
In 1952 Skarin's daughter and son-in-law, Hope and Lynn M. Hilton, sent an unfavorable study they had made of Annalee's book to LDS apostle and president of the Deseret News, Mark E. Petersen. A Sunstone article by Samuel Taylor describes the ensuing events:

In the spring of 1952 Annalee was visiting friends, Chris and Sally Franchow, in Salt Lake City. ... As news of her visit became known, she was besieged with invitations to speak at Church and fireside groups. ... After addressing an enthusiastic congregation, she was ushered into the bishop’s office where she was confronted by Elder Mark E. Petersen, a member of the Council of the Twelve. He denounced Ye Are Gods as inspired by Satan, and demanded that she repent and repudiate the book. "And then it was that I, who love Christ above all others," she wrote, "was acclaimed to be the great anti-Christ." When she rejected the ultimatum, she was tried by a Church court and excommunicated in June 1952.

Annalee called it a "kangaroo court," where "I was refused counsel. My efforts to bear witness to what I had written, or even to defend myself, were denied and silenced." When Sally Franchow tried to defend her, "For her courageous efforts she too was excommunicated."

Seven months after Annalee's excommunication Petersen wrote a letter explaining the reason for the action. He explained that in the LDS Church only revelations to the president of the church affecting church members were valid and binding; all others were of the devil. His status as the sole revelator would pass to his successors and he could appoint substitute revelators as needed. Since church president George Albert Smith did not appoint Annalee Skarin to be a revelator, her books could only be inspired by the devil.

== Later life ==
After her excommunication Skarin told followers, including the Franchow family, of her impending translation. Skarin then disappeared two weeks later in 1952, with conflicting reports of surrounding events.

Skarin used five or six aliases, including Evon Janson, while living in Los Angeles after her reported translation; Christine Mercie, while publishing the book Sons of God; and for many years Nansela Mathews.

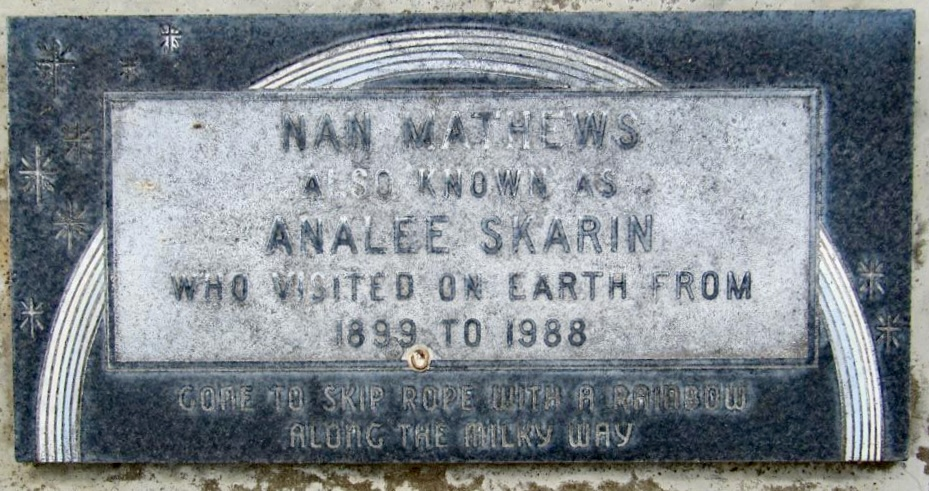
Headstone of Annalee Skarin in Sunset Hill Cemetery, Corning, California

Skarin's death certificate, dated January 17, 1988 has both names, Annalee Skarin and Nansela Mathews. It indicates she was buried in Sunset Hill Cemetery in Corning, California. One spiritualist responded to her claim of immortality this way: "Recent research undertaken suggests that Annalee Skarin and her husband, Reason, may have carried out one of the greatest hoaxes of the 20th century. This is substantiated by ... a visit to their graves. While claiming to have achieved everlasting life, it is evident that both Annalee and Reason are well and truly dead."

As of 2014, Ye Are Gods was in its 18th printing, though her later books were more popular among non-Latter-day Saints in the New Age movement. She accepted no royalties, and it remains unclear who, if anyone, profits from her many successful books.

== Works ==
The underlying theme in all of Skarin's writings was a desire to understand the deeper meaning behind scripture. Nine of Skarin's works are best sellers.

- The Pathway of Glory Annalee Skarin, compiled 1933–1946, self-published. Formed the basis for Ye Are Gods
- Ye Are Gods, self-published, 1948
- Ye Are Gods (ISBN 978-0-87516-718-3, published by De Vorss and Co, 1952) As of 2014 this book was in its 18th printing.
- Sons Of God, by Christine Mercie (ISBN 978-0-87516-059-7, pub. De Vorss and Co, 1954) A drama written by Annalee Skarin under a pen name. This was Annalee's first book written after her excommunication. As of 2003 it was in its 23rd printing.
- To God The Glory (ISBN 1-891265-02-4, pub. De Vorss and Co, 1956)
- Temple Of God (ISBN 1-891265-04-0, pub. De Vorss and Co, 1958)
- Secrets Of Eternity (ISBN 1-891265-05-9, pub. De Vorss and Co, 1960)
- Celestial Song Of Creation (ISBN 1-891265-06-7, pub. De Vorss and Co, 1962)
- Man Triumphant (ISBN 1-891265-03-2, pub. De Vorss and Co, 1966)
- Beyond Mortal Boundaries (ISBN 1-891265-07-5, pub. De Vorss and Co, 1969)
- The Book Of Books (ISBN 1-891265-08-3, pub. De Vorss and Co, 1972)
- Pathway of the GODS, Vol 1 date unknown 1995
- Pathway of the GODS, Vol 2 date unknown 1995
