= ZCMI Center Mall =

Former shopping mall in Salt Lake City, Utah

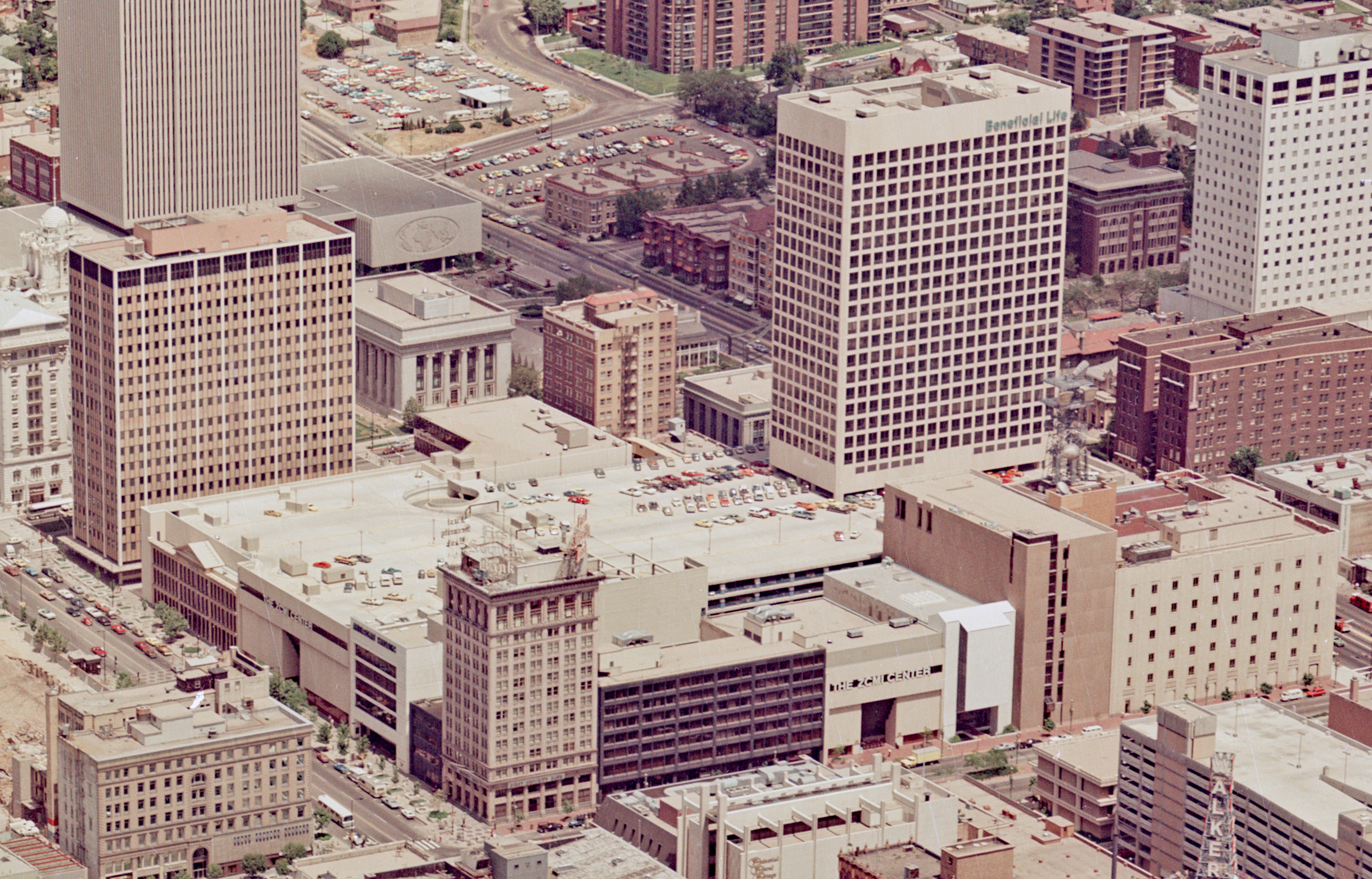
- An aerial view of the mall, 1978
- Location: Salt Lake City, Utah; United States
- Coordinates: 40°46′6″N 111°53′23″W
- Opened: July 17, 1975 (limited); September 22, 1975 (grand opening)
- Closed: 2007
- Owner: Zions Securities Corporation (The Church of Jesus Christ of Latter-day Saints)
- Architect: Gruen Associates
- Public transit: City Center Station

The ZCMI Center Mall was a shopping mall in downtown Salt Lake City, Utah, that operated from 1975 to 2007, before being demolished to make way for City Creek Center. The mall was developed and owned by Zions Securities Corporation, a for-profit entity owned by the Church of Jesus Christ of Latter-day Saints (LDS Church). The mall was located kitty-corner from the church's Temple Square.

The name, ZCMI, is an acronym for Zion's Co-operative Mercantile Institution, an early American department store founded by the LDS Church in 1868 and headquartered on the mall's site for many decades. ZCMI would be the mall's major tenant, which, at the time of its opening, was the largest downtown mall in the United States. Soon after the mall opened, another downtown shopping mall, Crossroads Plaza, was built directly across the street.

== Location ==
The mall covered the majority of block 75, which is bounded by Main Street on the west, South Temple on the north, State Street on the east, and 100 South on the south. ZCMI first opened a store at this site on April 1, 1876, allowing it to consolidate different departments into one structure; although, over time, the institution would expand to a number of buildings on the block.

== Construction ==
In May 1969, the LDS Church announced plans to develop a shopping mall on the block, which would replace ZCMI's ageing conglomerate of buildings. The mall would be anchored by a modern, much larger, ZCMI store. The plan, already under development for 10 years prior to the announcement, called for demolishing many of the buildings on the block, except for those on the corners, and included building an office tower.

Among the buildings demolished for the mall was Salt Lake City's Uptown Theatre, and while initial plans called for building a replacement movie theater in the new mall, those plans were eventually scrapped. Deseret Book Company's headquarters and store was also razed, with replacement facilities in the new mall complex.

On October 12, 1971, pile driving started, which marked the official beginning of mall construction. During construction, buildings on the southern half of the block, along with the ZCMI parking structure, were demolished first. That half of the mall was then built, after which ZCMI temporarily moved into the new southern portion. The ZCMI buildings on the north half of the block were then demolished and the remaining half of the mall was constructed, after which ZCMI then moved into permanent quarters in the north part of the mall. This allowed ZCMI to remain open during the mall's construction. The mall was designed by Gruen Associates and construction was managed as a joint venture between Christiansen Brothers Construction and WW Clyde.

Since opening in 1876, the ZCMI store building had an historic iron façade which faced Main Street. Early plans called for maintaining the "spirit and semblance" of this historic front when the buildings behind it were demolished. This included either saving and restoring the façade, or fabricating a new one made to look like the original. Local architect, Steven T. Baird, determined there was enough historic fabric remaining that the façade could be restored rather than replaced; a process he would oversee. In October 1973, disassembly of the façade began. Old paint layers were removed and some sections of the façade had to be replaced with new cast iron. The façade was then reconstructed, in approximately its original location, on the face of the mall's new ZCMI store.

Several of the neighboring buildings not part of the ZCMI project, such as First Security Bank's Deseret Plaza, took the opportunity to remodel or rebuild while the mall was being constructed. As part of transforming the block into a mall, ZCMI moved its headquarters to South Salt Lake, leaving only its flagship store downtown. (Note: The new headquarters was on 900 West, just south of the present SR-201.)

== Operations ==
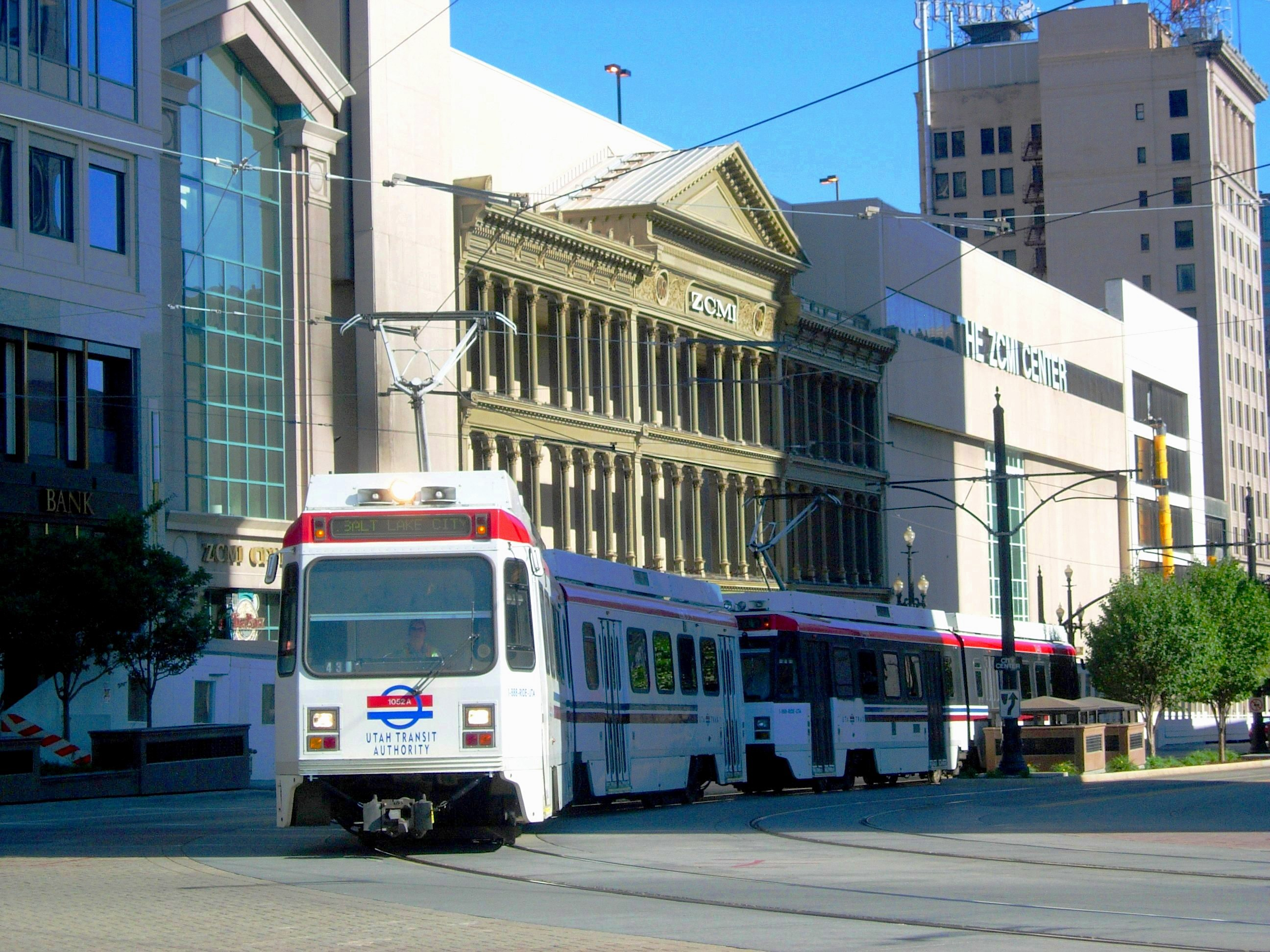
A UTA TRAX train passes the mall with its ZCMI Cast Iron Front during early stages of demolition, 2007

=== Opening ===
The ZCMI Center first opened to the public on July 17, 1975. At the time only the southern half of the mall had been completed, and the only stores open that day were Joseph Magnin, Weisfield's Jewelers, and ZCMI, with additional stores opening over the following weeks.

The grand opening was held September 22, 1975, with the mayor of Salt Lake City, Conrad B. Harrison, cutting the ribbon. Also at the ceremonies were LDS Church leaders, including N. Eldon Tanner. The grand opening ceremonies lasted six days, and included an antique car parade through the complex's new six-level parking garage, and a performance by the Utah Symphony. At its opening, the mall included two levels of retail and cost $50 million (equivalent to $299,165,121 in 2025).

Once the northern part of the mall was completed, Deseret Book held its grand opening on April 2, 1976 with a ribbon cutting by LDS Church president Spencer W. Kimball and ZCMI—recently moved into the north portion of the mall from temporary quarters in the south portion—was opened and dedicated on September 13, 1976, also by President Kimball. The completed mall had 2,000,000 square feet (190,000 m^{2}) of space, of which 300,000 square feet (28,000 m^{2}) was for retail. Once fully occupied, the mall contained 60 stores.

=== Beneficial Life Tower ===
Included in the mall's construction was a 26-story office building. Beneficial Life Insurance Company, also owned by the LDS Church, purchased the building's top 20 floors (Note: The lower six floors were part of the mall.) for $12 million (equivalent to $71,799,629 in 2025) and the building became known as Beneficial Life Tower. Intermountain Healthcare and Bonneville International were among other tenants of the building at its opening. Beneficial Life moved into the tower in November 1975. The tower included approximately 375,000 square feet (34,800 m^{2}) of space, with 18,000 square feet (1,700 m^{2}) on each floor.

When the ZCMI Center was demolished in the 2000s, the Beneficial Life Tower remained and was incorporated into City Creek Center. It was renamed as the KeyBank Tower at City Creek.

=== Later developments ===
In 1991, a tunnel was excavated under State Street to provide access between the ZCMI Center and parking structures on the block east of the mall. During the excavation, the foundations of Salt Lake City's historic Social Hall were discovered. The Social Hall Heritage Museum was then created, which displayed the foundation and discovered artifacts, while also serving as the tunnel's eastern entrance/exit.

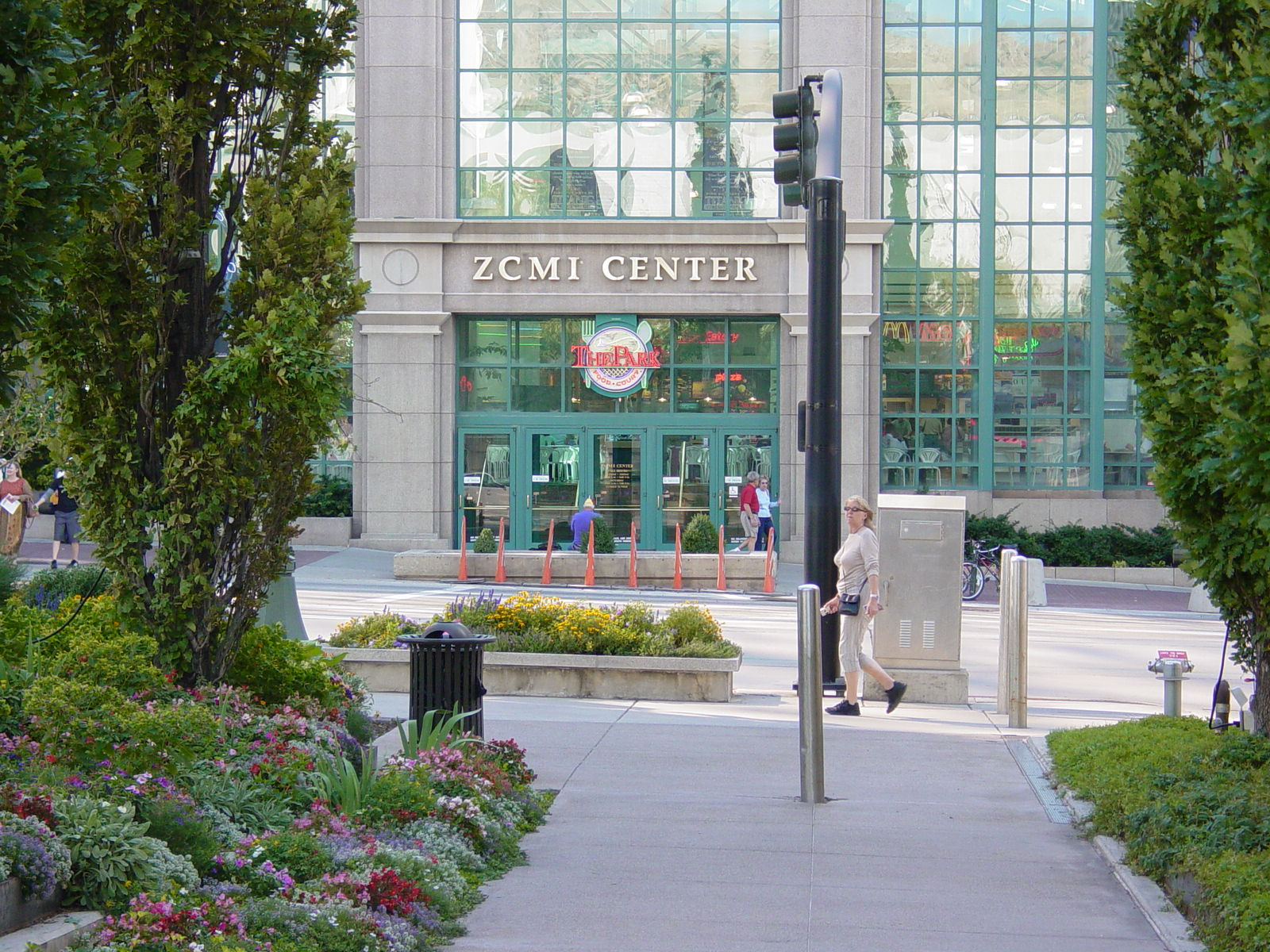
Entrance to the ZCMI Center Mall food court, 2004

The Park Food Court was opened in April 1992, replacing an open-air plaza that had surrounded the office tower (then known as the Kennecott Building) in the northwest corner of the block.

The Utah Museum of Natural History operated the "Annex at the ZCMI Center" where a traveling Titanic exhibition titled Titanic: The Artifact Exhibition by Premier Exhibitions was hosted in 2004–2005.

== Demolition and replacement ==
In 2003, the LDS Church purchased the neighboring Crossroads Plaza. On October 8 of that year, the church presented preliminary plans to significantly remodel both Crossroads Plaza and the ZCMI Center Mall. Three years later, on October 3, 2006, the church announced more detailed plans regarding the development. These new plans would no longer preserve the two different downtown malls, but rather would demolish them and build a single mall, known as City Creek Center.

Demolition for the new mall started towards the end of 2006, beginning with the Inn at Temple Square on a neighboring block. The final day retail stores were open in ZCMI Center was July 28, 2007, and its parking structures closed a few days later. The mall's food court, which remained opened longer than its retail operations, closed on October 6, 2008. City Creek Center opened in ZCMI Center's place on March 22, 2012.

One of the mall's memorable features was a large chandelier that hung in the ZCMI store. The chandelier, which was made of Austrian glass and handblown crystal imported from Venice, Italy, weighed 3 tons and was made exclusively for the store when it opened in 1975. Macy's, which by 2007 owned the assets of ZCMI department stores, donated 1,500 pieces of the dismantled chandelier to various charitable organizations when the mall closed. Nearly one-third went to the Daughters of Utah Pioneers.
