= Utah Property Management Associates =

- Company type: Private
- Industry: Property management, real estate, real estate development
- Predecessor: Zions Securities Corporation
- Founded: February 7, 1922; 104 years ago
- Founder: The Church of Jesus Christ of Latter-day Saints
- Headquarters: Salt Lake City, Utah, United States
- Key people: Ashley J Powell (President/CEO), Michael Johnson (CFO)
- Owner: The Church of Jesus Christ of Latter-day Saints
- Parent: Property Reserve Inc.

Utah Property Management Associates (UPMA), formerly Zions Securities Corporation (ZSC), is a subsidiary of Property Reserve Inc., which manages property owned by the Church of Jesus Christ of Latter-day Saints (LDS Church), mostly in Salt Lake City, Utah. The company manages major corporate, residential, and retail spaces along with parking lots and plazas.

== History ==
Zions Securities Corporation was established in February 1922 as a holding and management company for the taxable, for-profit real estate belonging to the LDS Church. At the time of its incorporation, this included 52 properties valued at approximately $2 million (equivalent to $38,469,185 in 2025). One notable church-owned property excluded from ZSC's ownership was the Hotel Utah, which was already being managed by a separate company.

In September 1966, the church incorporated Deseret Management Corporation to manage its for-profit companies, including ZSC. Deseret Management Corporation transferred control of ZSC to Property Reserve Inc. (another real estate company affiliated by the LDS Church) in 2010; at the time ZSC was described as a commercial real estate developer.

In January 2012, ZSC changed its name to Utah Property Management Associates, LLC (UPMA). UPMA is part of the Investment Properties Management Department of the LDS Church.

Through a $2 billion investment in City Creek Center, UPMA participated in a $5 billion church-funded effort to redevelop downtown Salt Lake City in the 2010s.

== Properties ==
=== Commercial properties ===
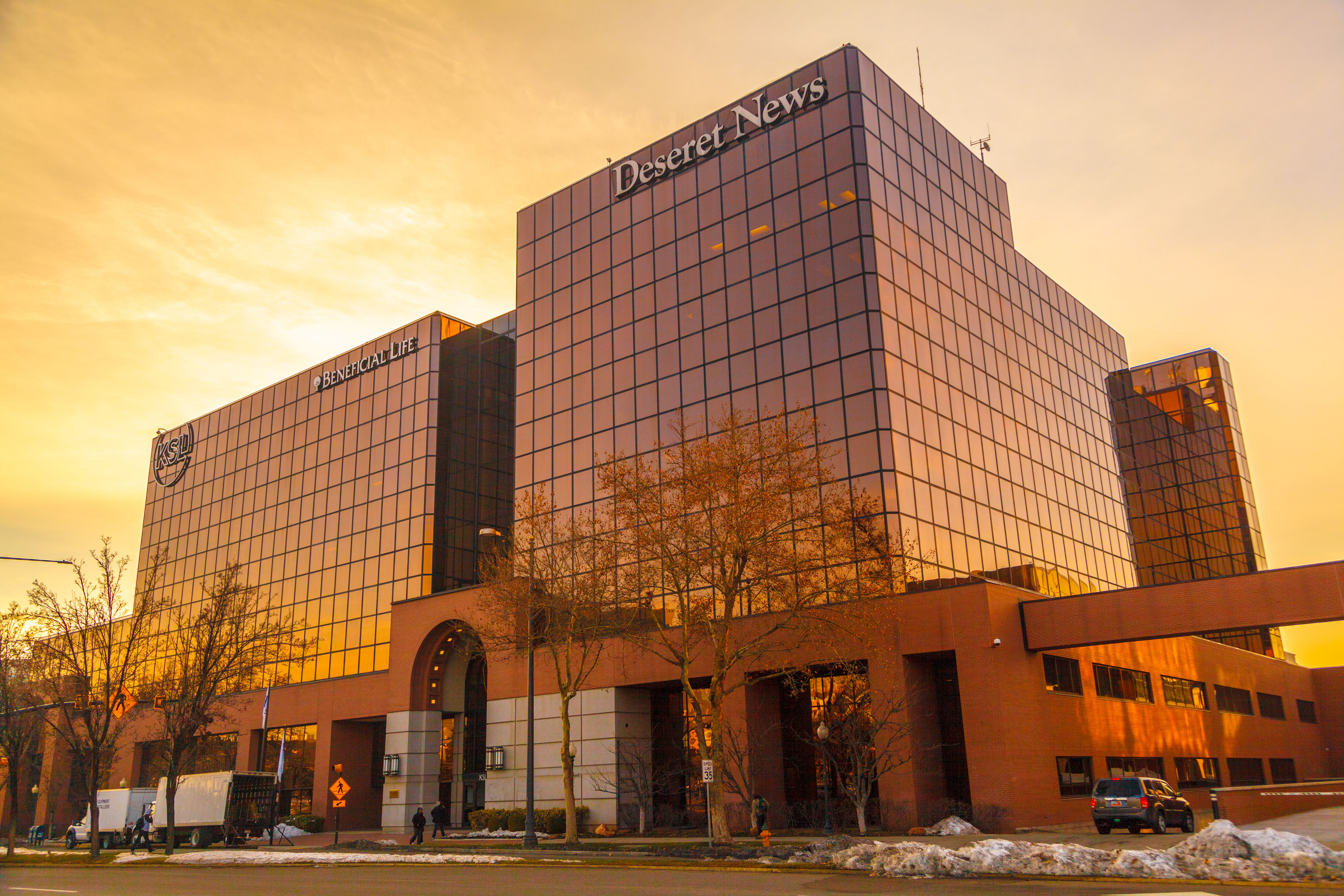
The Triad Center in Salt Lake City, December 2013

UPMA currently owns and operates the following commercial properties in Downtown Salt Lake City:

Class A Commercial buildings

- Beneficial Tower
- Deseret News Building
- Eagle Gate Plaza & Office Tower
- Key Bank Tower
- Social Hall Plaza
- Triad Center
- Zions Bank Building

Class B Commercial buildings

- 139 East South Temple
- J. C. Penney Building

Other Commercial buildings

- Deseret Book Building
- Eagle Gate Parking Plaza
- McIntyre Building
- Orpheum Office Plaza

=== Residential properties ===
UPMA currently owns and operates the following residential properties, all of which are in Salt Lake City, Utah, except as noted.

- Brigham Apartments
- Colonial Court Apartments
- Eagle Gate Apartments
- Gateway Condominiums
- West Temple Apartments
- Garden Apartments
- First Avenue Apartments
- Hanover East Paces Apartments (Atlanta, Georgia)

=== Mixed use properties ===
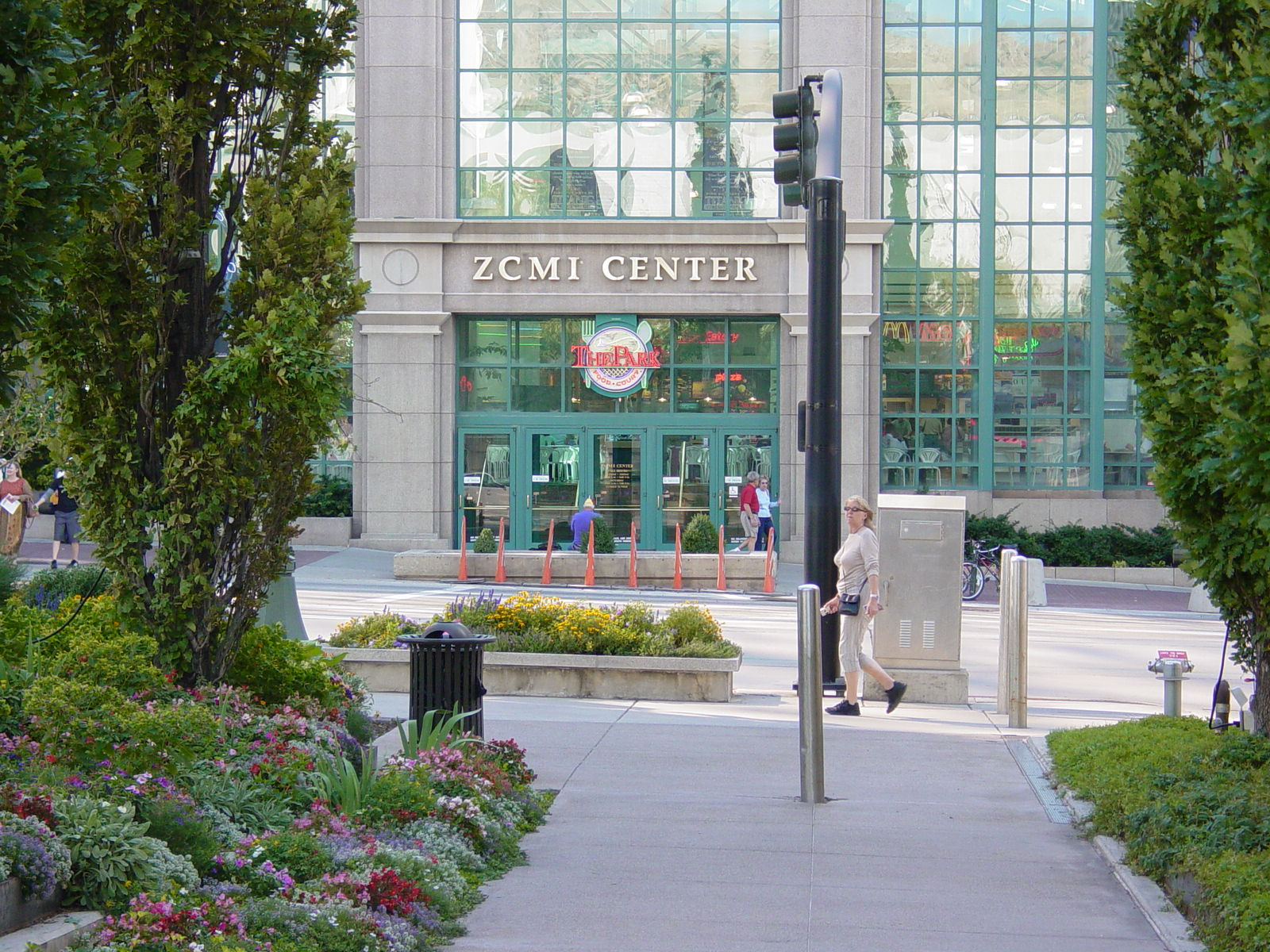
Entrance to the former ZCMI Center Mall in Downtown Salt Lake City, September 2004

- City Creek Center (Salt Lake City)
- Lake Park Corporate Centre (Salt Lake City)
- Highbury at Lake Park (West Valley City, Utah)
- Shoal Creek Valley (near Liberty, Missouri)
- 1600 Vine Street Complex (Philadelphia, Pennsylvania)

== Former properties ==
- Belvedere Apartments (Salt Lake City)
- Inn at Temple Square (Salt Lake City) – Demolished for City Creek Center development
- Veterans Administration Hospital (Salt Lake City)
- ZCMI Center Mall (Salt Lake City) – Demolished for City Creek Center development
