= Orrin G. Hatch United States Courthouse =

2014 building in Salt Lake City, Utah, U.S.

Coordinates: 40.7612°N 111.8930°W

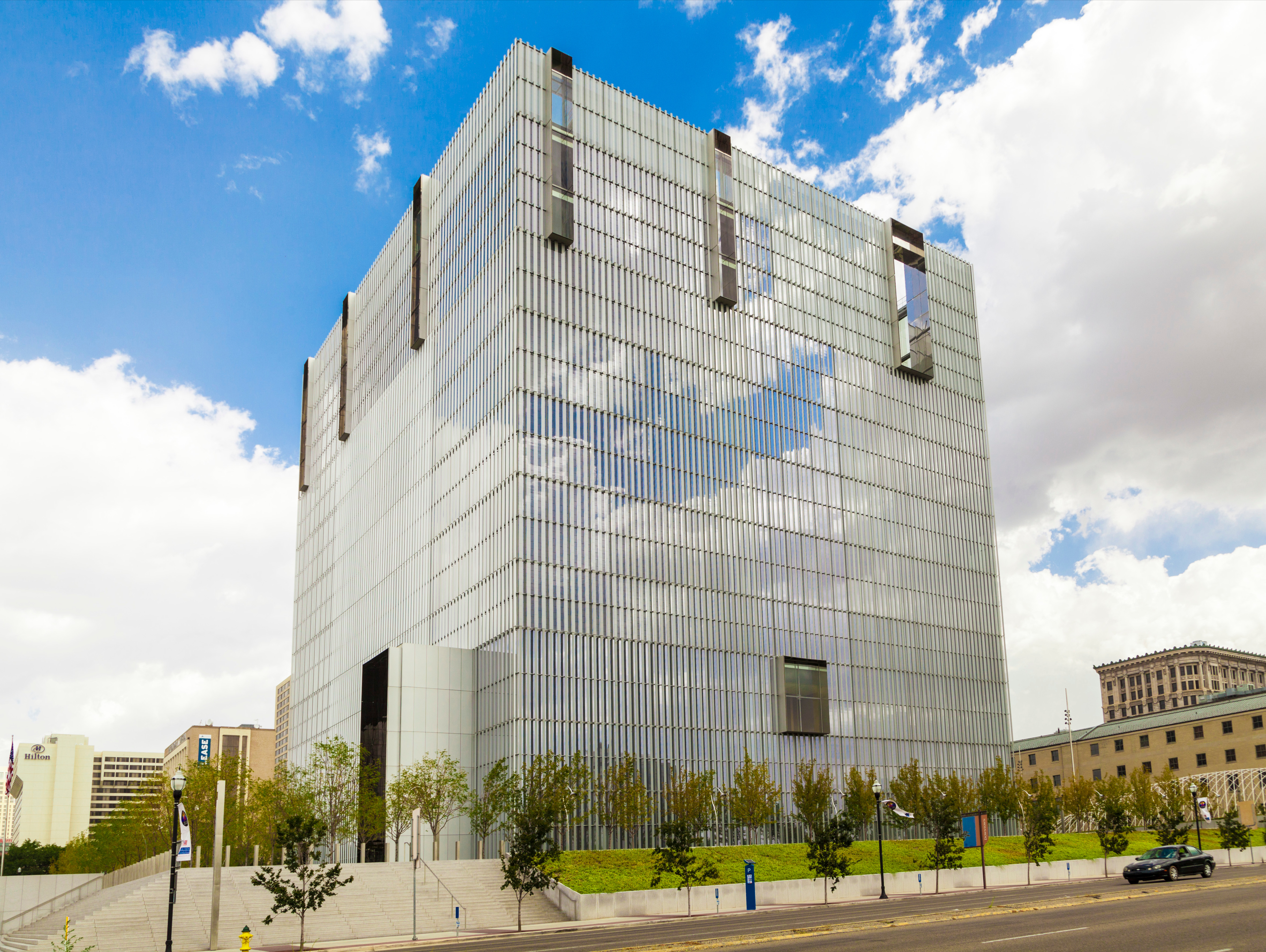
- Looking northeast at the United States Courthouse for the District of Utah ("Borg Cube"), September 2015

General information
- Type: Courthouse
- Location: 351 South West Temple Street, Salt Lake City, United States
- Opened: April 2014

Design and construction
- Architect: Thomas Phifer
- Architecture firm: Thomas Phifer and Partners; Naylor Wentworth Lund Architects

The Orrin G. Hatch United States Courthouse in Salt Lake City, Utah, United States is a federal courthouse located at 351 South West Temple Street in downtown Salt Lake City, on the corner of 400 South and West Temple. It is located behind the Frank E. Moss United States Courthouse. The building houses the United States District Court for the District of Utah. It opened on April 14, 2014.

The courthouse was designed by Thomas Phifer of the Thomas Phifer & Partners architectural firm in New York City. While the courthouse has been named after US senator Orrin G. Hatch, locals have nicknamed it the "Borg Cube" after the Borg, the villainous alien race in Star Trek. The building's nickname was a reference to its cubical profile (the Borgs of Star Trek used cubical spaceships) and "austere aesthetic."

== History ==
Plans for a new federal courthouse in Salt Lake City took twenty years to secure funding and property before groundbreaking took place in January 2011. Design for a new courthouse began as early as 1997, but security updates were added after the September 11 attacks in 2001, and Congress only appropriating funding in 2010. The total cost of the project was around $186 million; this is less than the original budget request of $211 million or $226 million. Ultimately, the funding delay allowed the courthouse to be built for less, because construction and material costs were lower during the Great Recession.

Of the total cost, some $7.5 million was to purchase the Port O' Call bar. Some $6.7 million was to move the historic three-story Odd Fellows Hall hall to Market Street. Federal authorities worked for months with preservationists to secure the hall's transfer. Other buildings, including an old gas station, had to be razed for that the courthouse could get its required security perimeter. The project made extensive use of recycled materials and landfill diversion; as the project neared completion, builders reported 86 percent waste diversion.

The new courthouse houses many of the functions originally housed in the Frank E. Moss Federal Courthouse. The Moss Courthouse, a Classical Revival structure completed in 1905, underwent renovations in 1912 and 1932 and was added to the National Register of Historic Places in 1978. The construction of the new courthouse was prompted by needs for space, technology, and security in the Moss Courthouse. The new courthouse separates prisoner transport areas from hallways used by the public and staff; in the old courthouse, prisoners, judges, and members of the public shared the same hallways and elevators, presenting a security risk. The Moss Courthouse continues to house the U.S. bankruptcy court. The two courthouses are linked by an elevated landscaped garden. The AIA Institute Honor Award jury citation states that the new courthouse "stands respectfully beside" the Moss Courthouse and the two courthouses together "establish a distinct federal precinct and architectural anchor at the southwest perimeter of the downtown."

In 2020, the United States Congress unanimously passed a bill to name the courthouse after Orrin Hatch, who served as a U.S. Senator from Utah from 1977 to 2019. President Donald Trump signed the bill into law on December 21, 2020. The Senate had previously voted to name the courthouse after Hatch shortly before his retirement, but the move had no force of law at the time, as federal facilities cannot be named after serving members of Congress.

=== 2014 shooting ===
On April 21, 2014, one week after the courthouse's opening, criminal defendant Siale Angilau, 25, a member of the Tongan Crip Gang, was fatally shot by a deputy U.S. marshal after he grabbed a pen or a pencil and charged the witness stand in an attempt to attack a witness. Angilau was on trial for racketeering and other charges. This incident occurred in the courtroom of U.S. District Judge Tena Campbell.

== Design ==
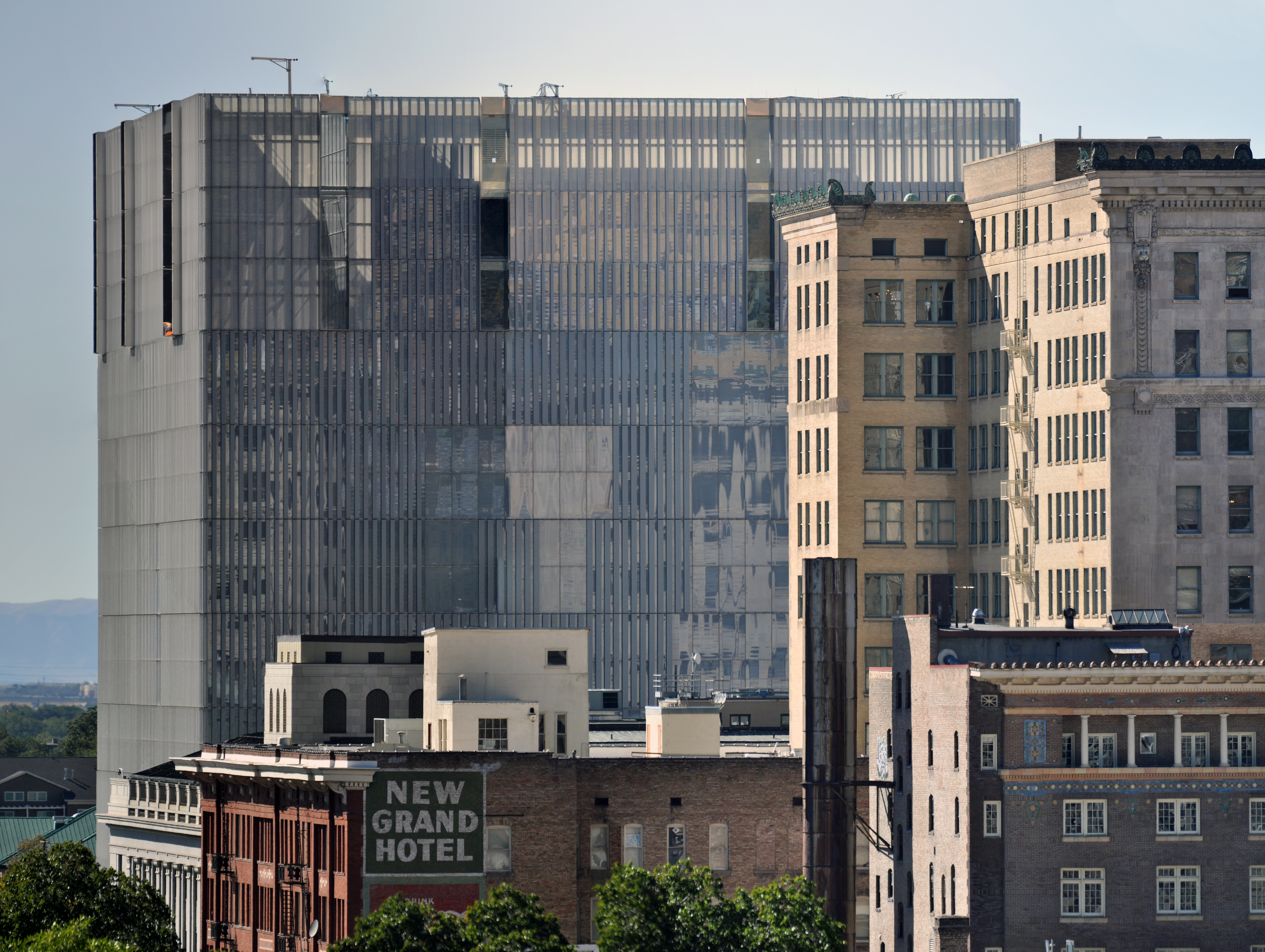
View of the U.S. Courthouse for the District of Utah as seen from the northwest corner of the top of the Salt Lake City Public Library main branch in downtown Salt Lake City, September 2013.

The courthouse is "essentially one big cube with courtrooms at the corners." It is ten stories tall above grade and 409,397 square feet. The courthouse is 180 feet long, 180 feet wide, and nearly 200 feet tall. It has ten courtrooms (seven for district judges, three for magistrate judges), fourteen judges' chambers, and two underground levels for parking and building support. It also houses offices of the U.S. Marshals Service and the U.S. Probation and Pretrial Services office. The new courthouse also meets new federal building security standards; the courthouse is set back fifty feet from the street and includes blast protection features, including progressive collapse design.

The first floor has a public café, a jury orientation suite, and an intake counter. The second floor is office space for the court clerk's office. The ten current courtrooms are on floors three, seven and eight. The fifth and sixth floors have additional space for nine more courtrooms to be created, if needed. The fourth floor contains offices. Judges' chambers are located on the top two floors.

The courthouse has a modern style, and relies extensively on "daylighting." Many windows of clear glass, as well as a skin of anodized aluminum, allow the courthouse to make extensive use of natural light in working spaces. All of the courtrooms were built against exterior walls to allow light to shine in. The courtrooms "occupy the four corners of the building, bathed in filtered natural daylight, bringing clarity and context to the proceedings within." The building contains a ten-story atrium containing a ten-story suspended sculpture (composed of 380 hexagonal tubes of optical aluminum on cables) by the glass artist James Carpenter. The courthouse also features two reflecting pools on the building's west side near the main entry. A smaller one is located to the south, while a larger one to the north runs the length of the building. The building earned LEED Gold certification for energy efficiency and environmental sustainability.

=== Reception ===
The courthouse's reception was deeply polarized. The building is described as shiny and sterile-looking or austere. The courthouse was praised by architects, who have called it "modern," "sophisticated," "elegant," "stunning," "sleek," and "cutting edge."

Architects have praised the courthouse's "aspirational design," which uses extensive amounts of sunlight to reflect the values of transparency and fairness in the justice system. The AIA wrote that the courthouse's design "resulted from a search for a physical symbol to express the American system of justice—the form had to be strong, iconic, transparent, and egalitarian. The cubic massing of this courthouse captures all of these elements in a recognizable form that projects grounded dignity and substantive order and presents an equal face to all sides." The AIA states that the transparency is tempered by "vertical aluminum sunscreens on the exterior ... with a variable protective veil that modulates quietly with the passing of the sun. Vertical fluting of these delicate elements refers subtly back to the classical orders of the Frank E. Moss Courthouse and to the broader traditions of the judiciary."

The building won a 2015 American Institute of Architects (AIA) Institute Honor Award for Architecture. The jury citation read:

This is a stunning project. The clarity of the building scheme and the way it relates to the surrounding context are impressive in a modern civic landmark.
The skin is extraordinary, with the patterns and density of louvers responding to the solar orientation. Mirror-finished apertures frame the entry and views of the city and mountains beyond.
Every space was done with care, simplicity, and great detail, emphasizing the importance of natural light. In contrast to the silvery exterior, the wood-clad interior is beautifully detailed and warm, including a monumental lobby stair.

The popular reception of the courthouse was less favorable, with critics panning the building as "hideous," like the "Central Bureaucracy building from Futurama," "a gigantic air conditioner compressor" and "something from 1950 Eastern Europe."

== Architects and contractors ==
The project's credits are:

- Architect: Thomas Phifer and Partners; Naylor Wentworth Lund Architects
- Owner: General Services Administration
- Acoustics: Arup
- Artwork, building enclosure: James Carpenter Design Associates
- Elevators: Lerch Bates Associates
- Civil engineering: McNeil Engineering
- Electrical engineering: BNA Consulting Engineers
- Mechanical engineering: Van Boerum & Frank Associates
- Structural engineering: Reaveley Engineers & Associates
- General contractor: Okland Construction
- Graphics: Piscatello Design Centre
- Landscape architecture: E. A. Lyman Landscape Architects
- LEED consultant: CRSA Architecture
- Lighting design: Fisher Marantz Stone
- Pool design: Water Design Inc.

== See also ==
- List of United States federal courthouses
- Courthouse (UTA station)
- Federal Reserve Bank of San Francisco Salt Lake City Branch
- Wallace F. Bennett Federal Building
