= Robert Riggs =

Robert Riggs may refer to:

- Robert Riggs (tennis) (1918–1995), tennis player
- Robert E. Riggs (1927–2014), American law professor
- Robert Riggs, illustrator, Society of Illustrators' Hall of Fame
- Robert "Freeze" Riggs, former Club Kid and drug dealer, convicted of the murder of Andre "Angel" Melendez
