= Frank E. Moss United States Courthouse =

Historic building in Salt Lake City, Utah, U.S.

Coordinates: 40.7613°N 111.8916°W

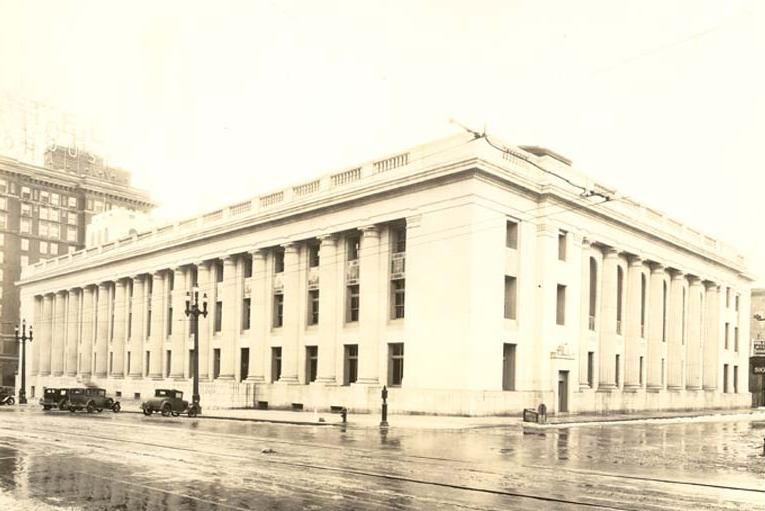
The Frank E. Moss United States Courthouse in 1933.

The Frank E. Moss United States Courthouse (originally known as the United States Post Office and Courthouse) is a historic United States federal courthouse and federal building in Salt Lake City, Utah.

The courthouse is located in Salt Lake's Exchange Place Historic District. It is the oldest building among eight buildings (all constructed between 1903 and 1917) that make up that district. The building reflect Utah's growing prosperity at the beginning of the twentieth century.

Until 2014, the courthouse housed most operations of the United States District Court for the District of Utah. The court eventually outgrew the courthouse, and a new, modern-style $186 million courthouse, the U.S. Courthouse for the District of Utah, was built adjacent to the Moss Courthouse. Most court operations moved to the new courthouse, which opened in 2014. However, the United States bankruptcy court for Utah remains at the Moss Courthouse. Other federal agencies (which had been housed in leased space) were also relocated to the Moss Courthouse.

== Building history ==
After Utah was admitted to the Union in 1896, planning began for a federal building in the capital city. The following year, Congress appropriated $500,000 for site acquisition and building construction. The selected site was purchased from two local bankers, the Walker brothers, for one silver dollar on November 21, 1899.

The Classical Revival style building was designed by the Office of the Supervising Architect of the United States Department of the Treasury headed by James Knox Taylor. Construction began in the summer of 1902. Flaws in the stonework delayed construction, but the United States Post Office and Courthouse was finished in late 1905. An addition, which echoed the style of the original building, was constructed on its west (rear) side between 1910 and 1912.

In the late 1920s another addition was planned under the direction of Louis A. Simon, Superintendent of the Architectural Section of the Treasury Department. The design was intended to duplicate the earlier facades, but an unforeseen problem arose. During construction of the building's final addition, extensive cracking and spalling were discovered in the soft Kyune sandstone that faced the 1905 and 1912 sections. As a consequence, the addition was constructed entirely in granite and nearly all the existing facades were refaced to match. Work was completed in 1932.

In 1990 the courthouse was renamed in honor of Frank Edward Moss, a Utah native who served as United States Senator from 1959 to 1977. The Exchange Place Historic District, including the Frank E. Moss U.S. Courthouse, was added to the National Register of Historic Places in 1978. This district is also listed as a historic landmark on the Salt Lake Register of Cultural Resources.

== Architecture ==
Located on Main Street in Salt Lake City's Exchange Place Historic District, the courthouse helped introduce the Classical Revival style to Utah. The original building was constructed between 1902 and 1905 with a U-shaped plan. The two additions, completed in 1912 and 1932, closed the end of the U and added another U-shaped section. Together they form a plan with a figure-eight shape, enclosing a pair of light courts. When the last addition was constructed, the Classical Revival style was reinterpreted as a form of modern classicism that was prevalent for many public buildings of the 1930s.

The building rises five full stories above a basement and has a central two-story penthouse. The exterior walls of the 1905 and 1912 sections were originally clad in Kyune sandstone that experienced significant cracking and other damage over the years. These walls were refaced with Utah granite during the construction of the final addition. The only original sandstone wall surface remaining is on one of the eight internal light court elevations.

Because much of the original sandstone was replaced in 1932, the classically designed exterior displays elements of stylized modern classicism. Broad granite steps lead from the street to the courthouse's main entrance, along its east elevation. Flanking the steps are granite railings with streamlined detailing and eagles with outstretched wings. Atop the bronze entry doors are elaborate decorative grilles of bronze and aluminum.

A colonnade of fifteen fluted, engaged Doric columns spans the eastern facade, supporting a classical entablature and parapet with balustrade. Three-story high window openings are recessed behind the columns. In each bay, just below the third floor, is a decorative metal screen set on marble backing.

The north elevation is similar in style but not as wide with seven columns and ten window bays. Its three westernmost bays have wood spandrels and pediments in place of marble-backed metal screens. The south elevation, also ten bays wide, is simpler in design, having rectangular pilasters rather than the engaged columns of the north and east elevations.

The rear of the building, which faces west, presents the simplest elevation. It differs from the other three elevations, having neither columns nor pilasters, as it was intended to be the least visible when built. It is faced in yellow brick with a sandstone belt course. The north side of this elevation, which dates from the 1912 extension, has sandstone trim, while its south side, added in 1932, employs terra cotta for the window lintels and other elements. The internal light court elevations are also faced in yellow brick, except for the south elevation of the original building. It retains its intricately carved pilasters and capitals. This elevation originally faced the street.

Inside the courthouse, the floors of the main lobby and corridors are a combination of marble, tile, and terrazzo. Marble wainscoting appears throughout the 1905 portion of the courthouse. Three original courtrooms, located on the second floor, have retained much of their original appearance. They are two stories high, with oak wainscot and paneling, as well as ornamental plaster ceilings with decorative coffers.

Until 2014, the courthouse housed most operations of the United States District Court for the District of Utah. The court eventually outgrew the Moss Courthouse. A new, modern-style $186 million courthouse, the U.S. Courthouse for the District of Utah, was built adjacent to the old courthouse. Most court operations moved to the new courthouse, which opened in 2014. However, the United States bankruptcy court for Utah remains at the Moss Courthouse. Other federal agencies (which had been housed in leased space) were also relocated to the Moss Courthouse. While the new courthouse was being built, the Moss Courthouse underwent a simultaneous renovation, including interior alterations as well as upgrades to all major building systems.

== Significant events ==
- 1896: Utah becomes a state, and planning for a federal building in Salt Lake begins.
- 1899:The building site is purchased for one silver dollar.
- 1902-1905: The U.S. Post Office and Courthouse is constructed.
- 1910-1912: An addition is made to the west side of the building.
- 1932: A U-shaped addition to the south side gives the building its present plan; most of existing structure is refaced in granite.
- 1978: The building is listed in the National Register of Historic Places as part of the Exchange Place Historic District.
- 1990: The U.S. Courthouse is renamed in honor of Frank Moss, three-term U.S. Senator from Utah.

== Building facts ==
- Architect: James Knox Taylor, Supervising Architect of the Treasury Department
- Louis A. Simon, Superintendent of the Architecture Section
- Construction Dates: 1902-1905; additions 1910-1912, 1930–1932; renovation 2011-2014
- Landmark Status: Listed in the National Register of Historic Places as part of the Exchange Place Historic District (the district is also a Salt Lake City Historic Landmark)
- Location: 300-400 block of South Main Street
- Architectural Style: Classical Revival; Modern Classicism
- Primary Materials: Granite, sandstone, and terra cotta
- Prominent Features: Fluted Doric colonnade; Decorative grilles on entrance doors

== See also ==
- Federal Reserve Bank of San Francisco Salt Lake City Branch
- Wallace F. Bennett Federal Building
