= Robert E. Riggs =

American law professor (1927–2014)

Robert E. Riggs (1927–2014) held the Guy Anderson chair of law in the J. Reuben Clark Law School of Brigham Young University (BYU).

Riggs was born in Mesa, Arizona and raised as a member of the Church of Jesus Christ of Latter-day Saints. He was a participating member of that Church throughout his life.

Riggs graduated from Mesa Union High School in 1945. Later that year he was drafted into the United States military as World War II was about to conclude. He was stationed for a time in Korea, after the end of World War II and before the Korean War began. He then served a mission for The Church of Jesus Christ of Latter-day Saints in the British Isles. For the second year of his two year mission he was the editor of the Millennial Star. In September 1949 Riggs married Hazel Dawn MacDonald in the Mesa Arizona Temple. They had seven children.

Riggs received a bachelors and master's degree in political science from the University of Arizona. He then earned a PhD in political science from the University of Illinois at Urbana-Champaign while also spending a year at the University of Oxford on a Rotary Foundation Fellowship.

From 1955 to 1960 Riggs was a professor of political science at BYU. During this time he took a year leave and served as a Rockefeller Research Fellow in International Organization at Columbia University. From 1960 to 1963 Riggs was a reaerch associate at the University of Arizona while also earning a law degree there. He was then a lawyer in private practice in Arizona very briefly. He then went to Minnesota where he was a professor in the political science department at the University of Minnesota from 1964 to 1975. He served as mayor of Golden Valley, Minnesota for two terms. He also ran as a Democrat in the Minnesota 3rd Congressional District in 1974, which election he lost.

In 1975 Riggs joined the faculty of the BYU Law School, where he remained until 1992. From 1993 to 1994 he and his wife served as missionaries for the Church at the Mesa Arizona Temple Visitors Center.

== Sources ==
- Mormon Scholars Testify article on Riggs
- Obituary of Riggs
