= Wallace F. Bennett Federal Building =

Federal office building in Salt Lake City, Utah, U.S.

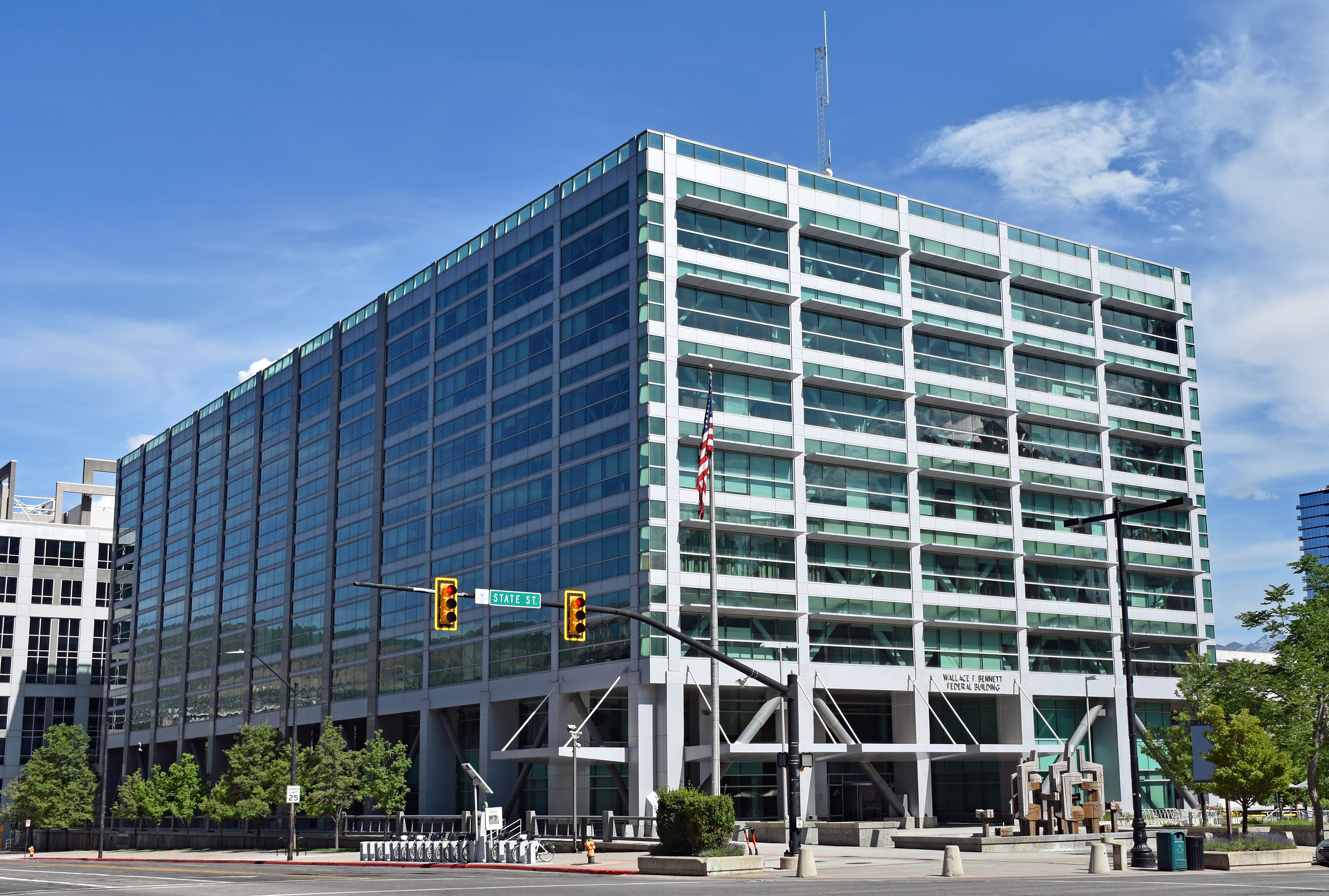
- The federal building in 2025
- Interactive map of the Wallace F. Bennett Federal Building area

General information
- Location: 125 S. State Street
- Coordinates: 40°46′0.4″N 111°53′13.57″W
- Year built: 1962–1964
- Inaugurated: May 23, 1964
- Renovated: 2001–2002
- Owner: General Services Administration

Technical details
- Floor count: 8

Design and construction
- Architecture firm: Deseret Architects & Engineers, and Snedaker, Budd, Monroe & Associates
- Main contractor: Robert E. McKee Contractors, Inc.

Renovating team
- Architect: Gillies Stransky Brems Smith Architects
- Main contractor: Big-D Construction

The Wallace F. Bennett Federal Building is a U.S. Federal building in downtown Salt Lake City, Utah. Opened in 1964, the structure serves as the primary office of the federal government in the state of Utah.

== Usage ==
As of 2025, the building houses 24 federal agencies with 600 federal employees working inside. Offices for both of Utah's federal senators are also located in the structure.

== History ==
=== Construction ===
As space for additional government offices ran out in Salt Lake City's old Federal Post Office and Courthouse building, various federal agencies were placed in buildings scattered throughout the city. In order to unify all federal offices in one structure, calls were made to construct a new federal office building.

In May 1961, the General Services Administration (GSA) announced the design of a new federal building to be constructed in the downtown area. Deseret Architects & Engineers, along with the firm of Snedaker, Budd, Monroe & Associates provided the design. The building was to be eight stories high, with the bottom two floors recessed inwards 25 feet (7.6 m) below the upper levels, along with underground parking. Unlike most buildings in the downtown area, the structure was to be set back from the nearby roads; 90 feet (27 m) back from State Street, creating a front plaza, and 25 feet (7.6 m) back from 100 South street along the side of the building. It was to be built of steel columns, reinforced concrete and faced with cast stone, and include 370,000 square feet (34,000 m^{2}) of floor space.

Prior to construction of the federal building, the site had to be cleared of several historic buildings which had once belonged to the government of Salt Lake City. One building, the old city hall, was taken apart in 1961 and then reconstructed across the street from the Utah State Capitol building. The remaining buildings were demolished in spring 1962.

Robert E. McKee Contractors, Inc. was awarded the contract for construction, and by June 1962, work on the foundation was underway with the driving of 1,050 steel encased piles into the ground (necessary given the soils left over from the bed of Lake Bonneville). In June of the following year, the contractor was reporting the building 60 percent completed, with glazing of the 1,200 windows to be completed that summer. In December 1963, a time capsule was sealed inside the northeast cornerstone of the building.

=== Opening ===
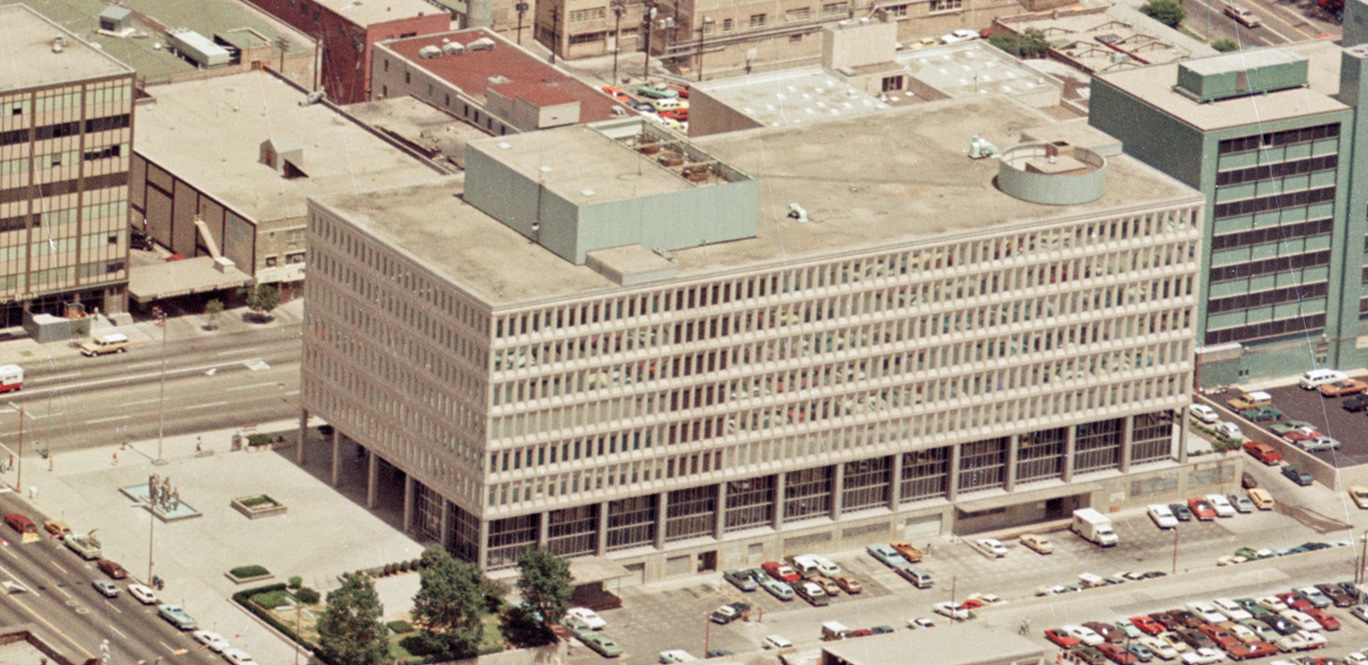
The federal building in 1978, with its original cast stone exterior

The first employees to begin using the new office building were the switchboard operators on January 20, 1964. They controlled the structure's Centrex system, which handled its 1,200 telephones. Other agencies began to move into the building in April, continuing through the end of May.

The building, costing $6.7 million (equivalent to $69,552,039 in 2025), was dedicated on May 23, 1964. During the ceremony, an invocation was given by Hugh B. Brown of the Church of Jesus Christ of Latter-day Saints, Senator Frank E. Moss delivered the address, while Lawson B. Knott Jr. presented the Great Seal of the United States to Utah's Governor George D. Clyde, and the benediction was pronounced by Most Rev. Joseph Lennox Federal, bishop of the Roman Catholic Diocese of Salt Lake City.

=== Continued usage ===
On May 27, 1986, what was simply known as the "Federal Building" was renamed the "Wallace F. Bennett Federal Building" in honor of Utah's former Senator Wallace F. Bennett.

In 2001, major renovations of the building began. This included adding an unbonded braced frame (UBF) to strength the structure in the case of an earthquake on the nearby Wasatch Fault, along with replacing the exterior precast stone panels with a new glass skin. The $20.5 million (equivalent to $36,695,190 in 2025) project concluded with a rededication ceremony, led by Bennett's son, Senator Bob Bennett on July 22, 2002.

In March 2025, the GSA, under the second Trump administration, listed the building as being a "non-core asset" and designated it for disposal. Although soon after, the non-core property list was removed from the agency's website, and when it was republished weeks later, the Bennett Federal Building was no longer listed.

== Artwork ==
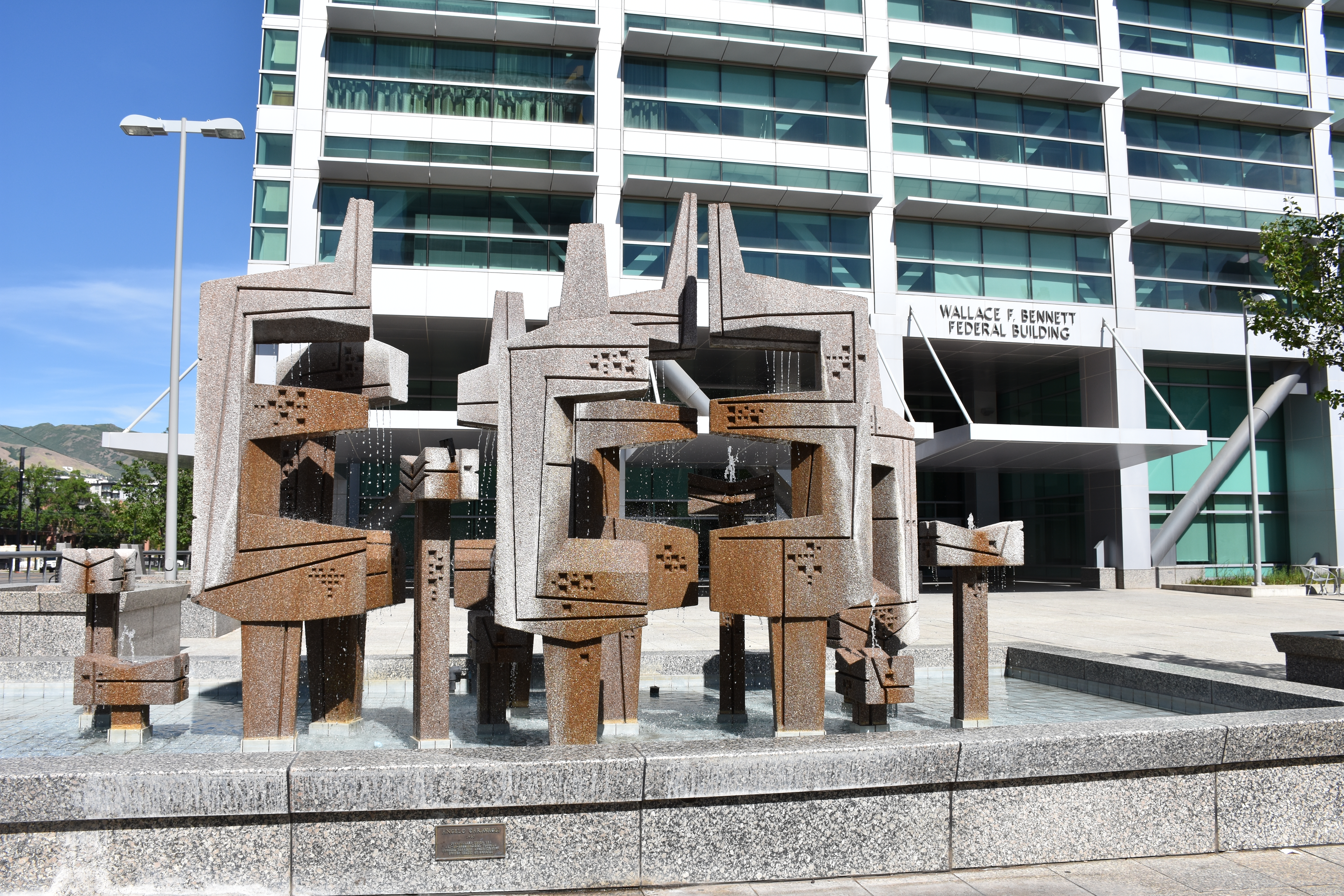
Angelo Caravaglia's fountain

In the plaza to the east of the building's main entrance is a fountain created by former University of Utah professor Angelo Caravaglia. Added to the plaza in October 1966, it contains 14 columns, each ranging from 3 feet (0.91 m) to 13 feet (4.0 m) high. Water cascades down the grooves in the columns to the pool below. The abstract work of art has no name or meaning, according to the GSA. When initially unveiled, the fountain's design was controversial, with opinions ranging from it being a "monstrosity" to being a "fresh contribution" to downtown.

== See also ==
- Federal Reserve Bank of San Francisco Salt Lake City Branch – across the street from the federal building
- Frank E. Moss United States Courthouse - the former federal office building in Salt Lake City
- Orrin G. Hatch United States Courthouse - courthouse of the US District Court for the District of Utah
