= Hotel Newhouse =

Demolished hotel in Salt Lake City, Utah, US

Coordinates: 40.761°N 111.891°W

The Hotel Newhouse was a 12-story, grand hotel in Salt Lake City, Utah.

== History ==
In 1907, mining magnate Samuel Newhouse launched a building campaign in an attempt to move the city's commercial center away from Temple Square to Exchange Place, which is four blocks to the south on Main Street. Construction was completed in 1912.

The Hotel Newhouse was one of a number of buildings financed by Newhouse in the area which also included the Boston and Newhouse Buildings, Utah's first true skyscrapers. The original design by Henry Ives Cobb, which was imagined to be one of the most opulent hotels in the West, was simplified upon construction due to a bankruptcy experienced by Newhouse and the completed structure stood without windows for a time, earning the satirical nickname "the best air-conditioned hotel in the West." For many years afterward, it stood as the "gentile" alternative to the Hotel Utah on the north side of downtown, and hosted many famous musicians and other noteworthy visitors. After its heyday, the building slowly fell into disrepair and was acquired by Earl Holding, the owner of the nearby rival Little America Hotel. Though it was deemed too costly to renovate by its new ownership, its nomination for the National Register of Historic Places in 1977 states that the building was "in good condition and had only experienced minor deterioration of fabric." The hotel was demolished on June 26, 1983 in front of a large crowd and widely reported on in national media and its longtime neighbor, the Terrace Ballroom, was demolished a few years later. Despite early plans to redevelop the block, the site eventually became part of a 10-acre parking lot that is now owned by City Creek Reserve.

== See also ==
- National Register of Historic Places listings in Salt Lake City
- Exchange Place Historic District
- Bigelow-Ben Lomond Hotel, another grand hotel in nearby Ogden, Utah that resembles the Hotel Newhouse
