= Independent Order of Odd Fellows Hall (Salt Lake City) =

Historic building in Salt Lake City, Utah, U.S.

- U.S. National Register of Historic Places
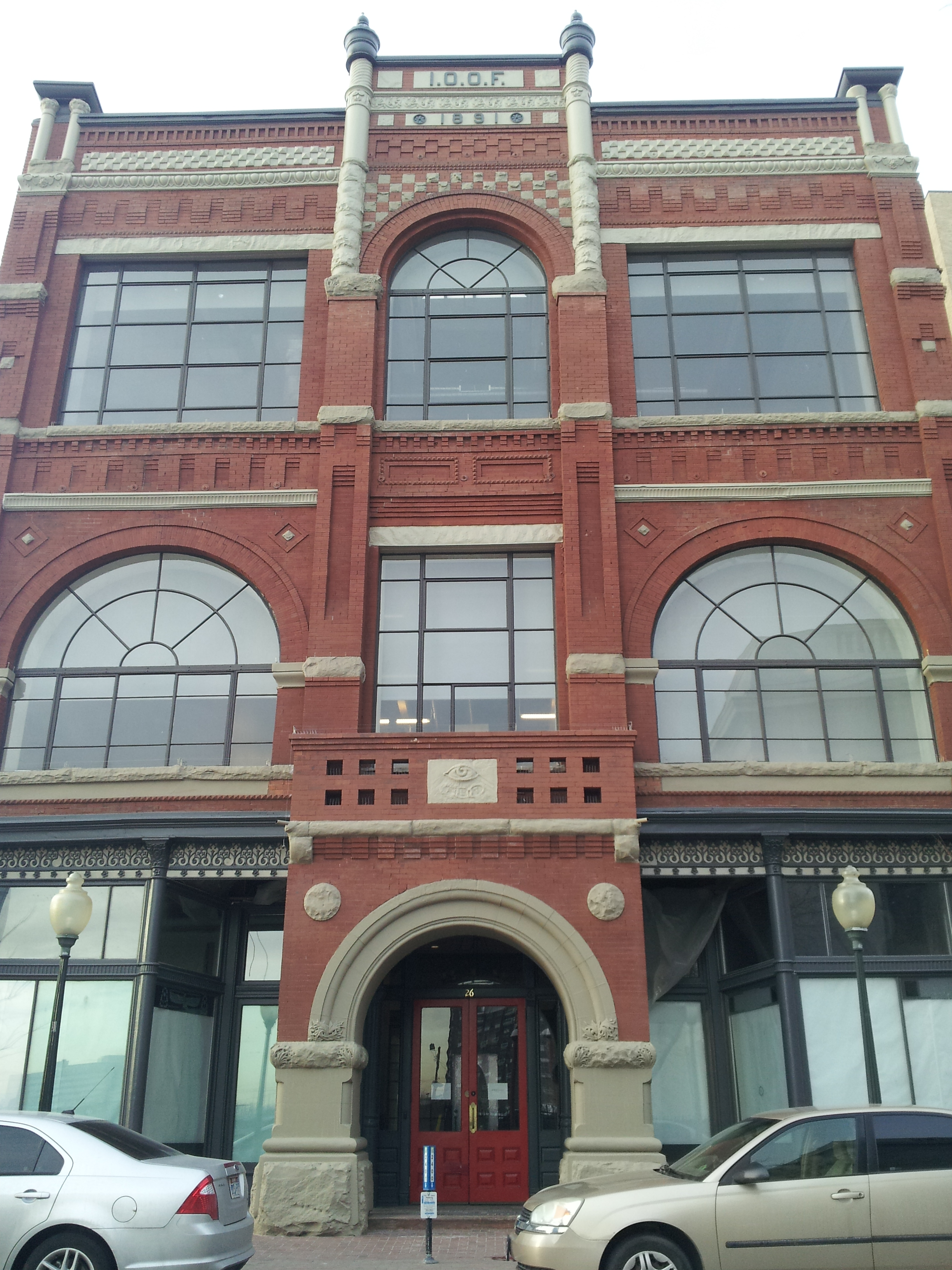

- Location within Utah Location within the United States
- Location: 26 West Market Street; Salt Lake City, Utah; United States
- Coordinates: 40°45′43″N 111°53′31″W
- Area: less than one acre
- Built: 1891
- Architect: Costersian, George F.
- Architectural style: Romanesque, Richardson Romanesque
- NRHP reference No.: 77001308
- Added to NRHP: November 07, 1977

The Independent Order of Odd Fellows Hall, also known as the I.O.O.F. Hall, is a historic clubhouse in Downtown, Salt Lake City, Utah, United States, that is listed on the National Register of Historic Places (NRHP).

== Description ==
The building was constructed at 41 Post Office Place (now West Market Street), but is now at 26 West Market. It was constructed in 1891 at a cost of $40,000 (equivalent to $1.43 million in 2025). It was designed by George F. Costersian in Richardsonian Romanesque style.

The building served historically as a meeting hall for the Independent Order of Odd Fellows. It is one of the few remaining examples of a large number of Richardsonian Romanesque commercial buildings erected in Salt Lake City during an 1889–1893 building boom.

It was listed on the NRHP November 7, 1977.

In 2009, it was moved across the street (and rotated 180 degrees) to make way to the new Federal Courthouse. This work was performed by Layton Construction Company, Inc. as general contractor and Emmert International as specialty transport contractor.

The building mass was approximately 5 million pounds of stone and brick at the time it was moved.

In 2011 the building was purchased by a private party and the interior rehabilitated including extensive seismic upgrades and new HVAC and plumbing systems and all new interiors. Today the entire building is occupied by Dennis Group, an engineering and construction company that services the food processing industry.

== See also ==
- National Register of Historic Places listings in Salt Lake City
