= Ramm Hansen =

Norwegian-born American architect (1879–1971)

Ramm Hansen (July 22, 1879 – December 30, 1971) was an early to mid-20th-century Norwegian-born, American architect.

Hans Leonard Ramm Hansen was born at Moss in Østfold, Norway. Hansen graduated cum laude from the Royal Academy of Art and Architecture in Oslo, Norway. In 1901 he moved to Salt Lake City and became a draftsman for Richard K.A. Kletting. Soon after, he partnered with different architects, including Cannon & Fetzer, who he designed the Park Building at the University of Utah. In 1916, he an entered a partnership which lasted into the 1950s with Don Carlos Young, Jr. (1882-1960), son of prominent architect Don Carlos Young.

His best-known existing works are the Mesa Arizona Temple, Idaho Falls Idaho Temple, and the Washington Chapel (now operated by the Unification Church at 2810 Sixteenth Street in Washington D.C.). Hansen served on a board of six architects for the Church of Jesus Christ of Latter-day Saints (LDS Church) which oversaw the design of the Idaho Falls Idaho Temple. Hansen designed numerous other civic buildings and churches for LDS Church, some of which are listed on the U.S. National Register of Historic Places.

== Images of works ==
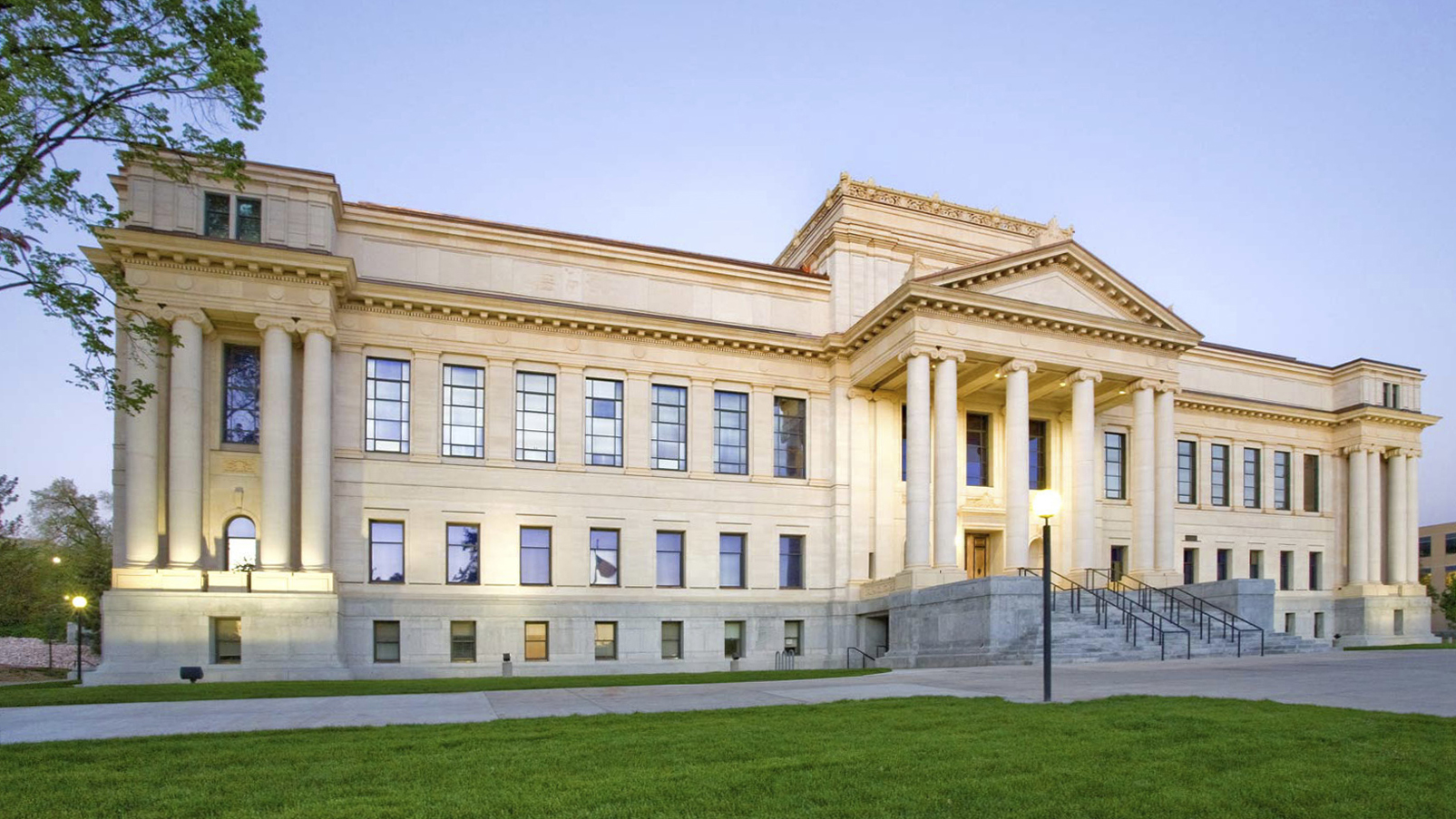
Park Building (1914)*NRHP listed in University of Utah Circle

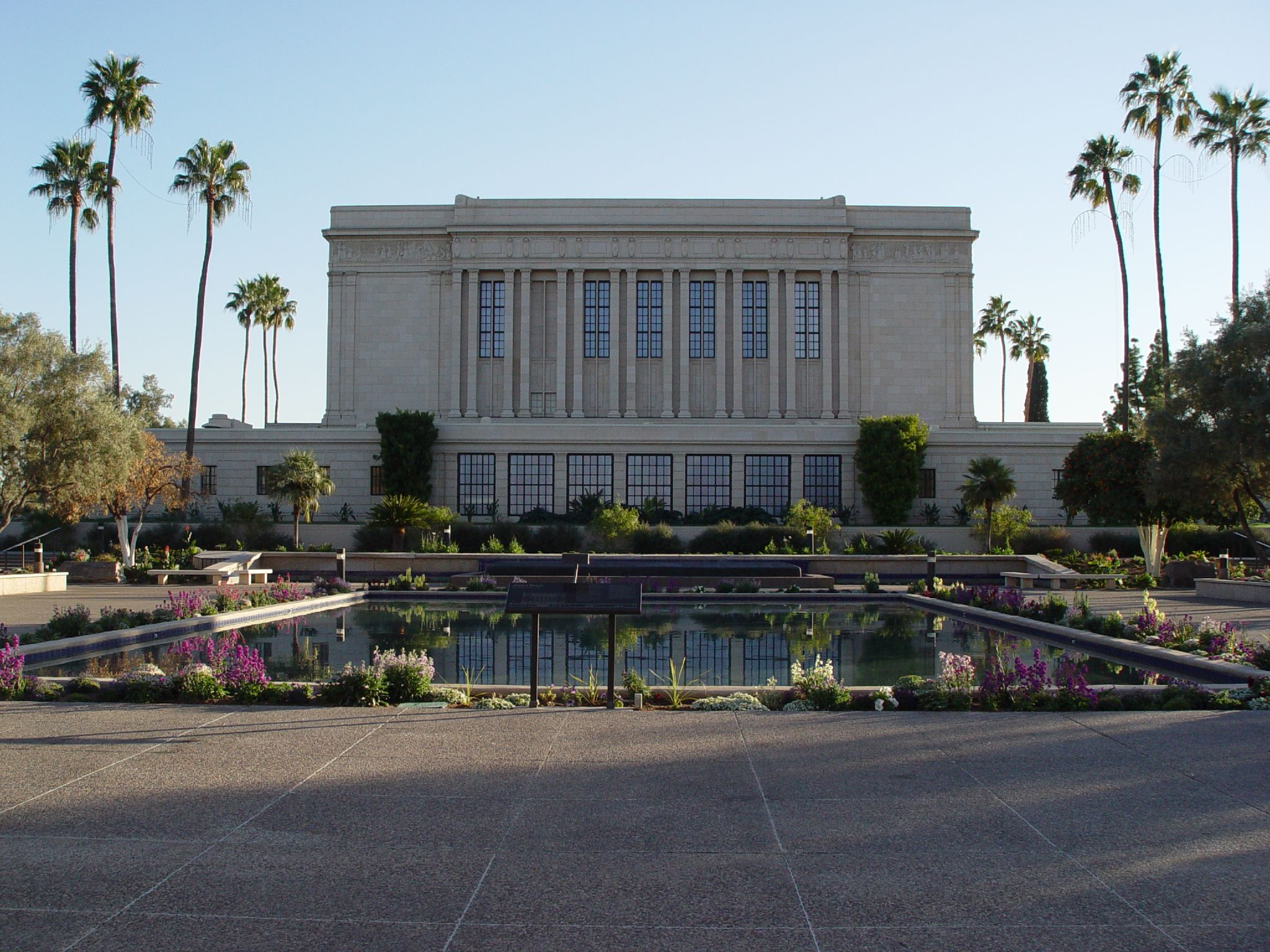
Mesa Arizona Temple (1927)

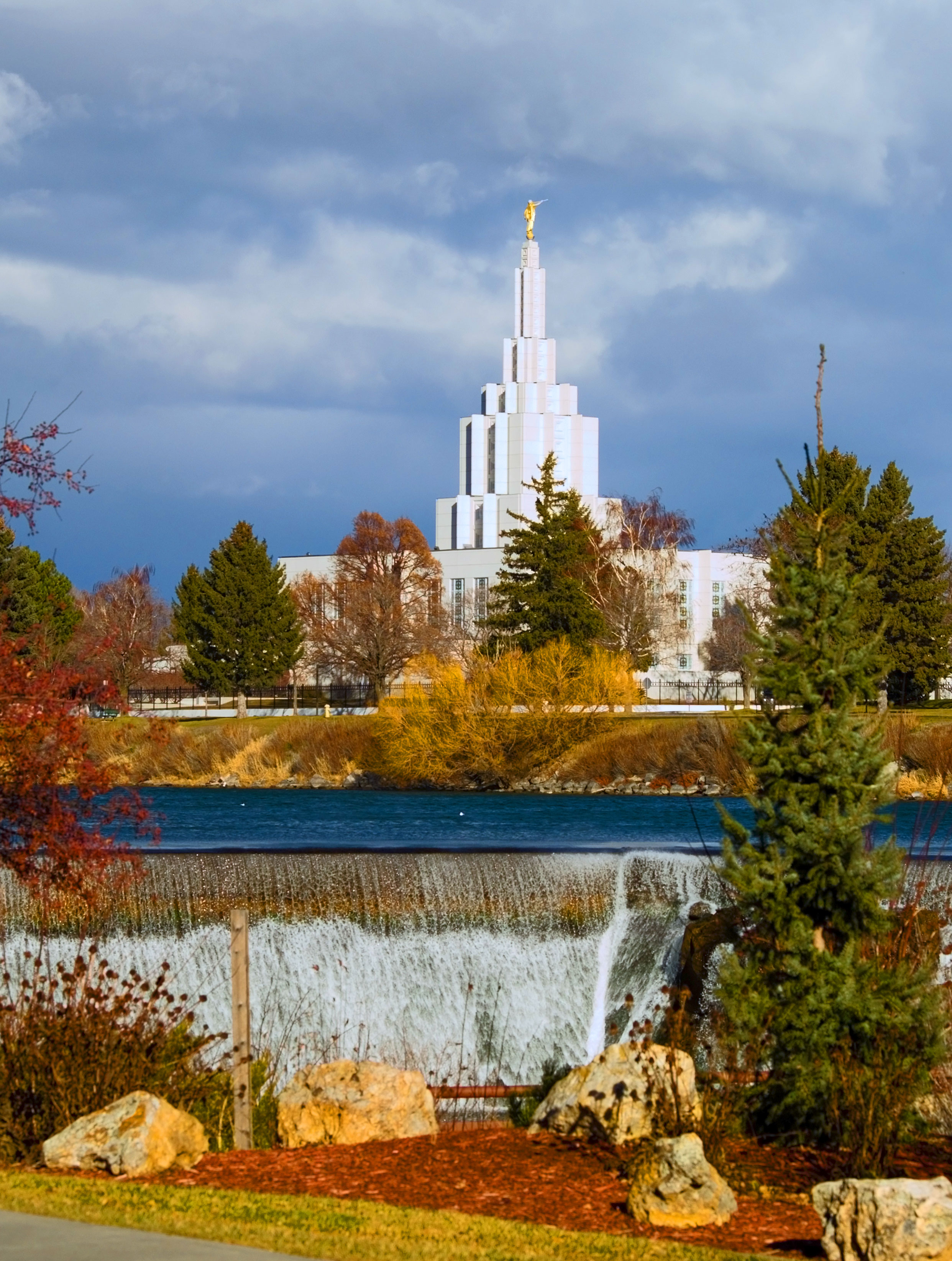
Idaho Falls Idaho Temple (1945)

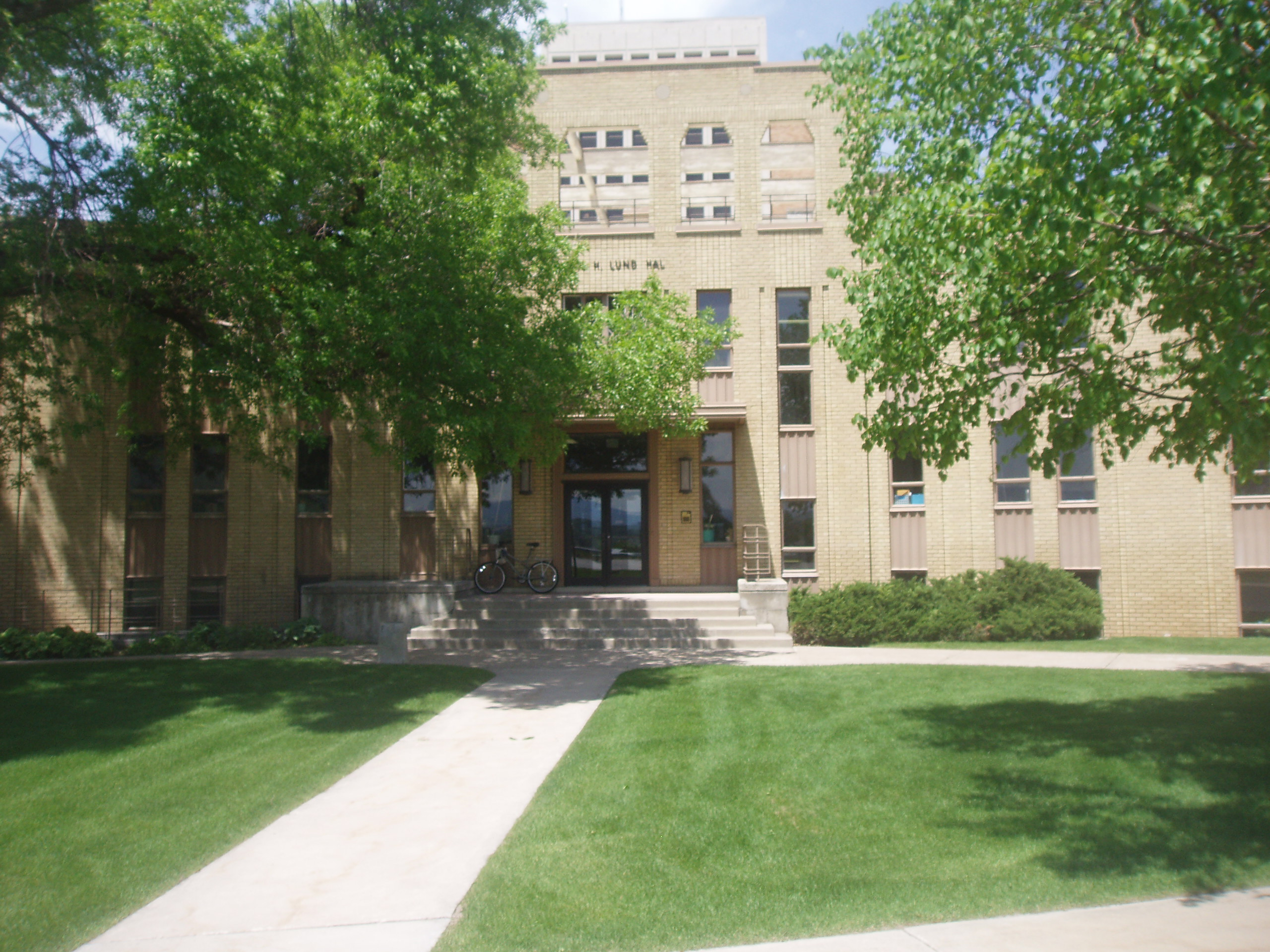
Utah State Women's Residence Hall (1937)*NRHP listed

== Other selected works ==
- Washington Chapel (1933) 2810 Sixteenth St., Washington D.C (Currently the Unification Church)
- Riverton 2nd Ward Meetinghouse *NRHP listed as part of the Riverton Historic District
- American Fork 2nd Ward Meetinghouse (1929 addition) *NRHP listed
- Federal Reserve Bank (1927; demolished 1984)
- Deseret Gymnasium (1910; demolished 1963)
