= Exchange Place Historic District =

Historic district in Salt Lake City, Utah, U.S.

- U.S. National Register of Historic Places
- U.S. Historic district
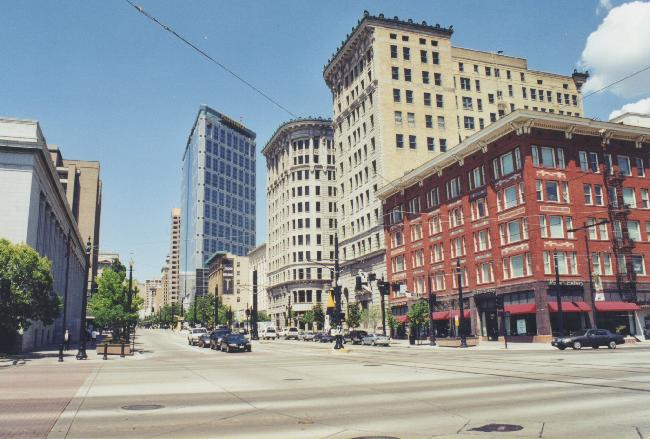
- North along South Main Street at the south end of the Exchange Place Historic District, 2002

- Location within Utah Location within the United States
- Location: Exchange Place and South Main Street; Salt Lake City, Utah; United States
- Coordinates: 40°45′38″N 111°53′22″W
- Area: 6.2 acres (2.5 ha)
- Built: 1903
- NRHP reference No.: 78002669
- Added to NRHP: August 10, 1978

The Exchange Place Historic District in Downtown Salt Lake City, Utah, United States is a historic district that was listed on the National Register of Historic Places in 1978. It included ten contributing buildings and three non-contributing buildings on a 6.2-acre (2.5 ha) area, with significance dating to 1903.

Its oldest building in the NRHP nomination was the Federal Building and Post Office, which had been built during 1903–06. That building was renamed in 1990 as the Frank E. Moss United States Courthouse.

In addition, the original nomination for the NRHP included the Felt Building (1909), Newhouse Realty Building (1917), Boston and Newhouse Buildings (1910), Federal Building and Post Office (1906), Salt Lake Stock and Mining Exchange Building (1908), Commercial Club Building (1908), New Grand Hotel (1910), Hotel Plandome (1905), and the now-demolished Hotel Newhouse (1912). The Sullivanesque Felt Building was designed by Richard K.A. Kletting, who designed many buildings around Salt Lake City such as the McIntyre Building farther north on Main Street and the Utah State Capitol. Other buildings included in the district boundaries today include the New York Hotel (1906), which today houses Market Street Grill, and the Judge Building (1907).

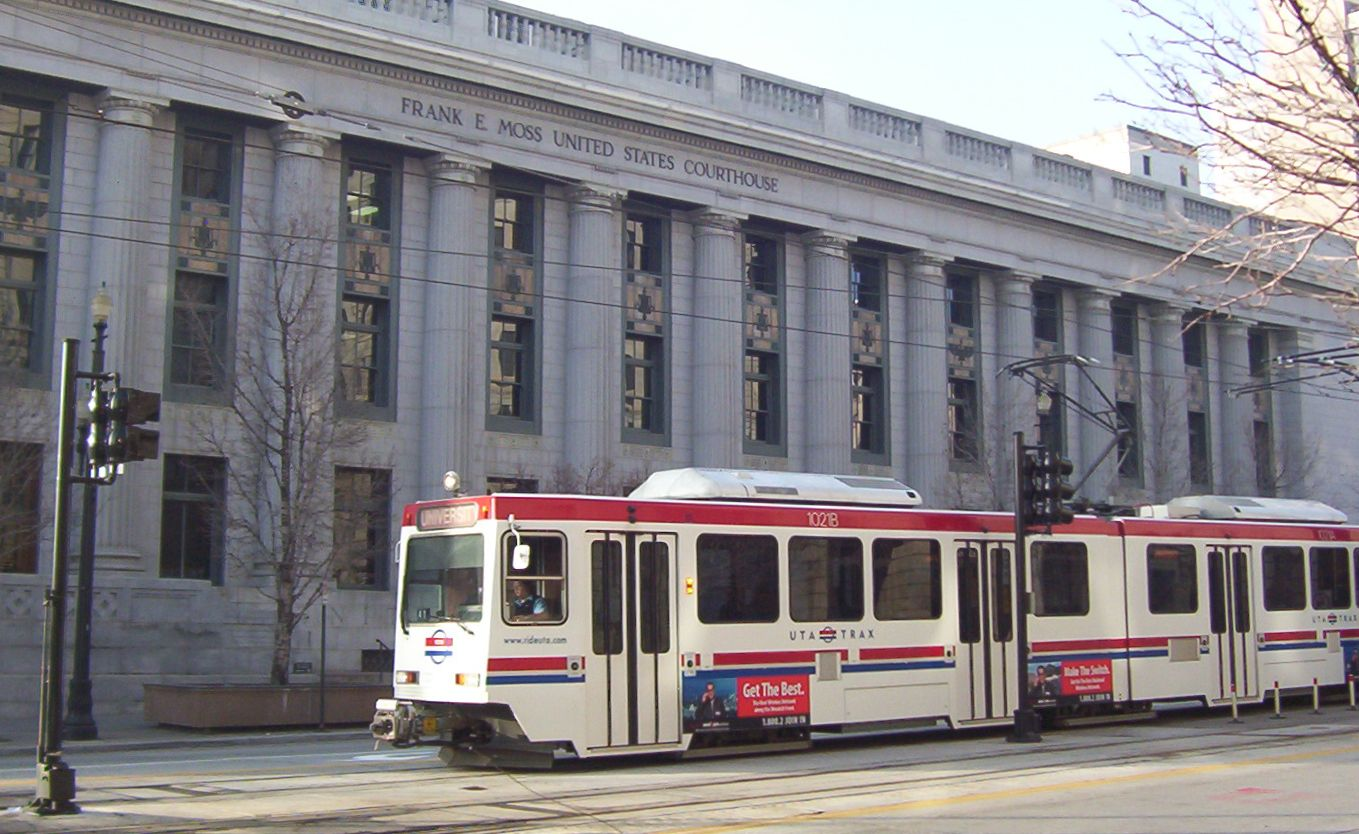
Frank E. Moss United States Courthouse in Salt Lake City, 2004

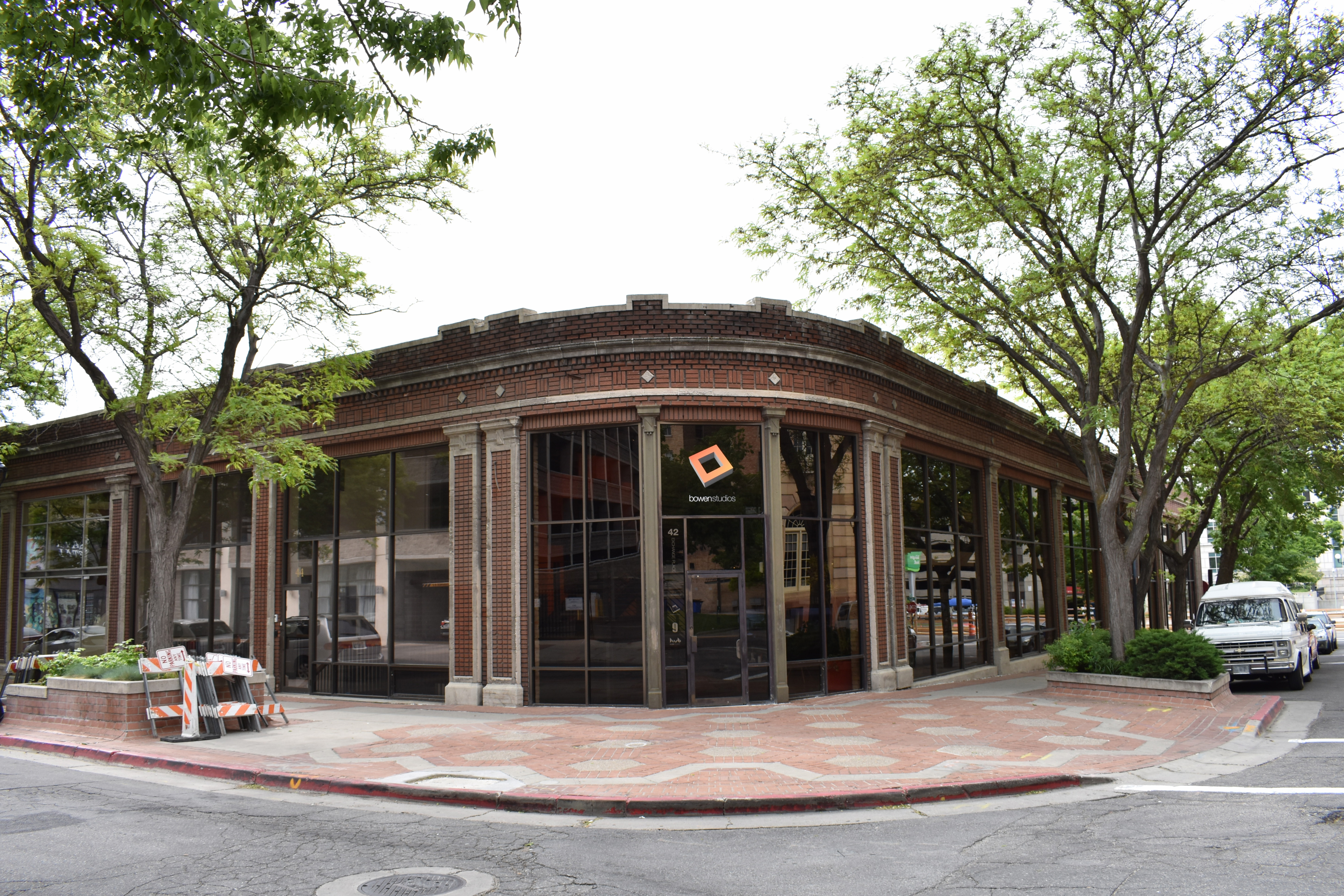
Newhouse Realty Building

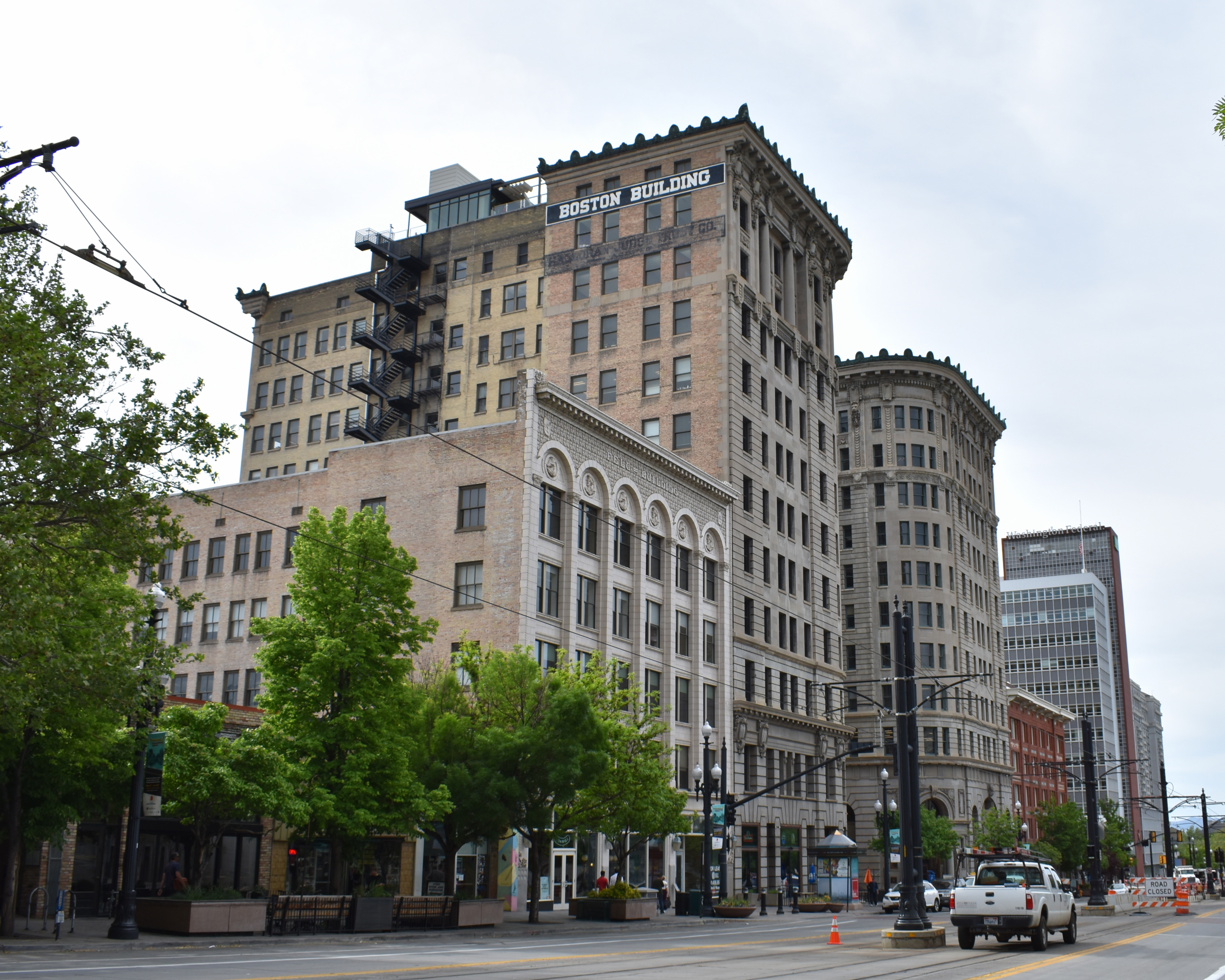
Felt Building (center-left) and the twin Boston and Newhouse Buildings (center-right)

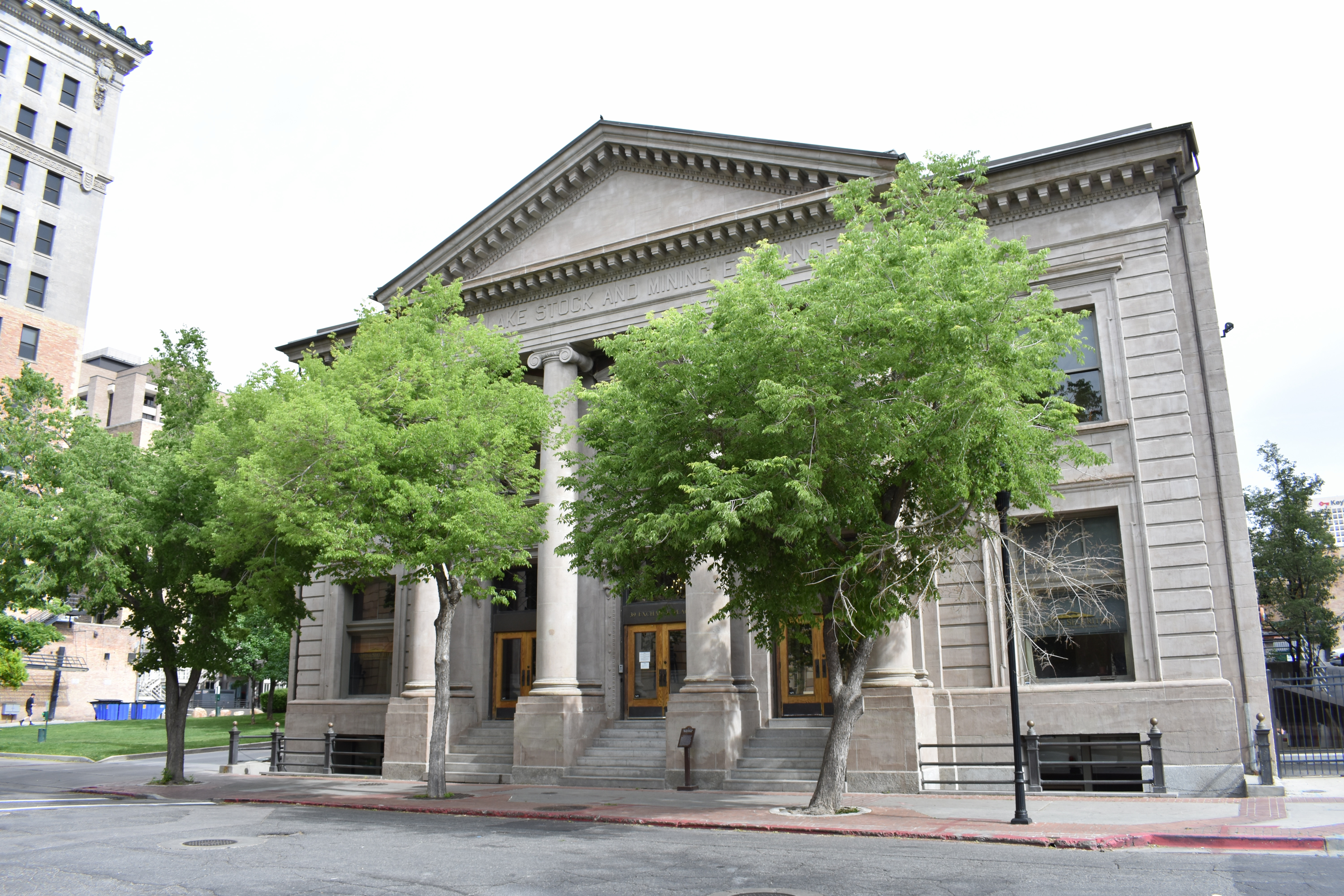
Salt Lake Stock and Mining Exchange Building

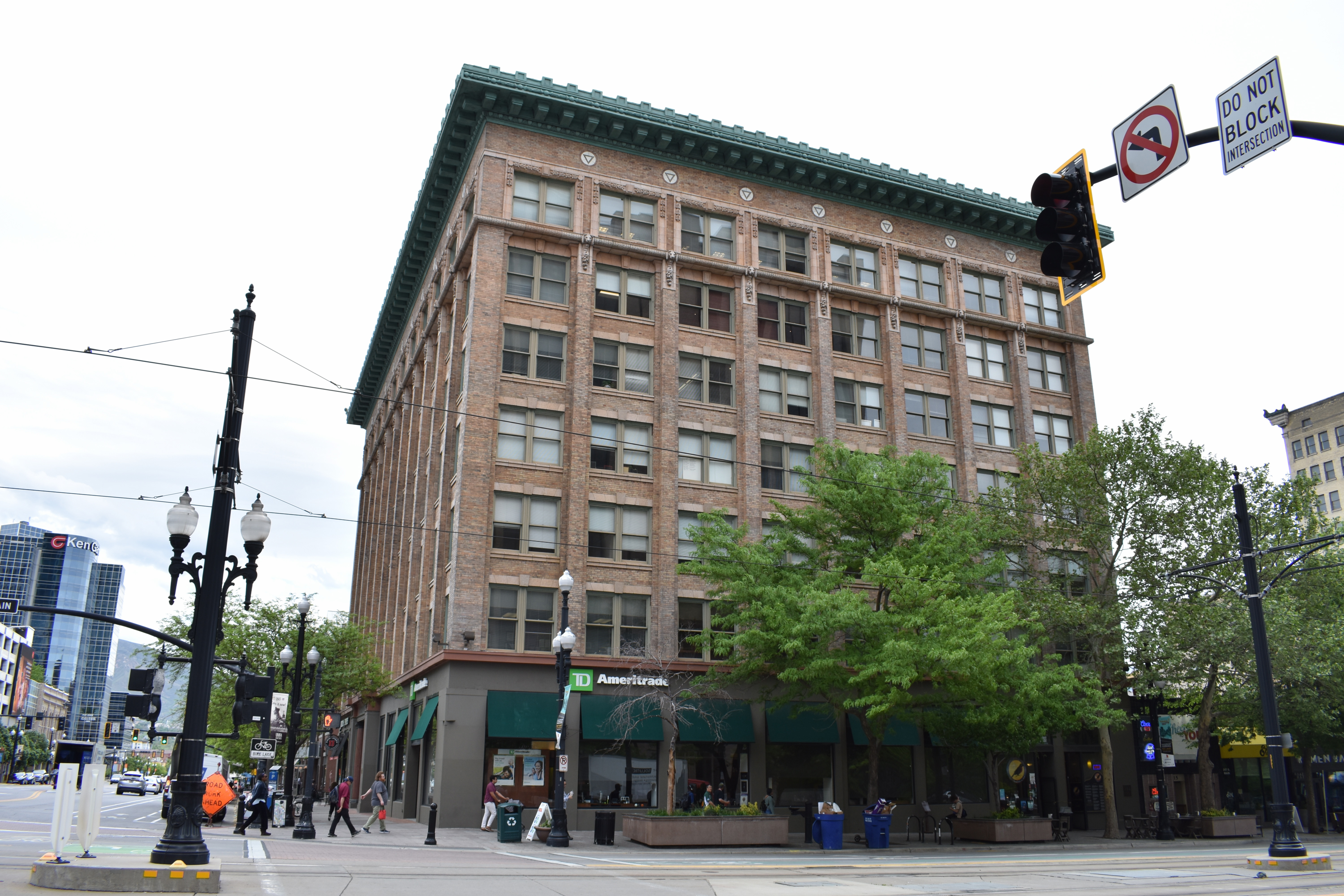
Judge Building

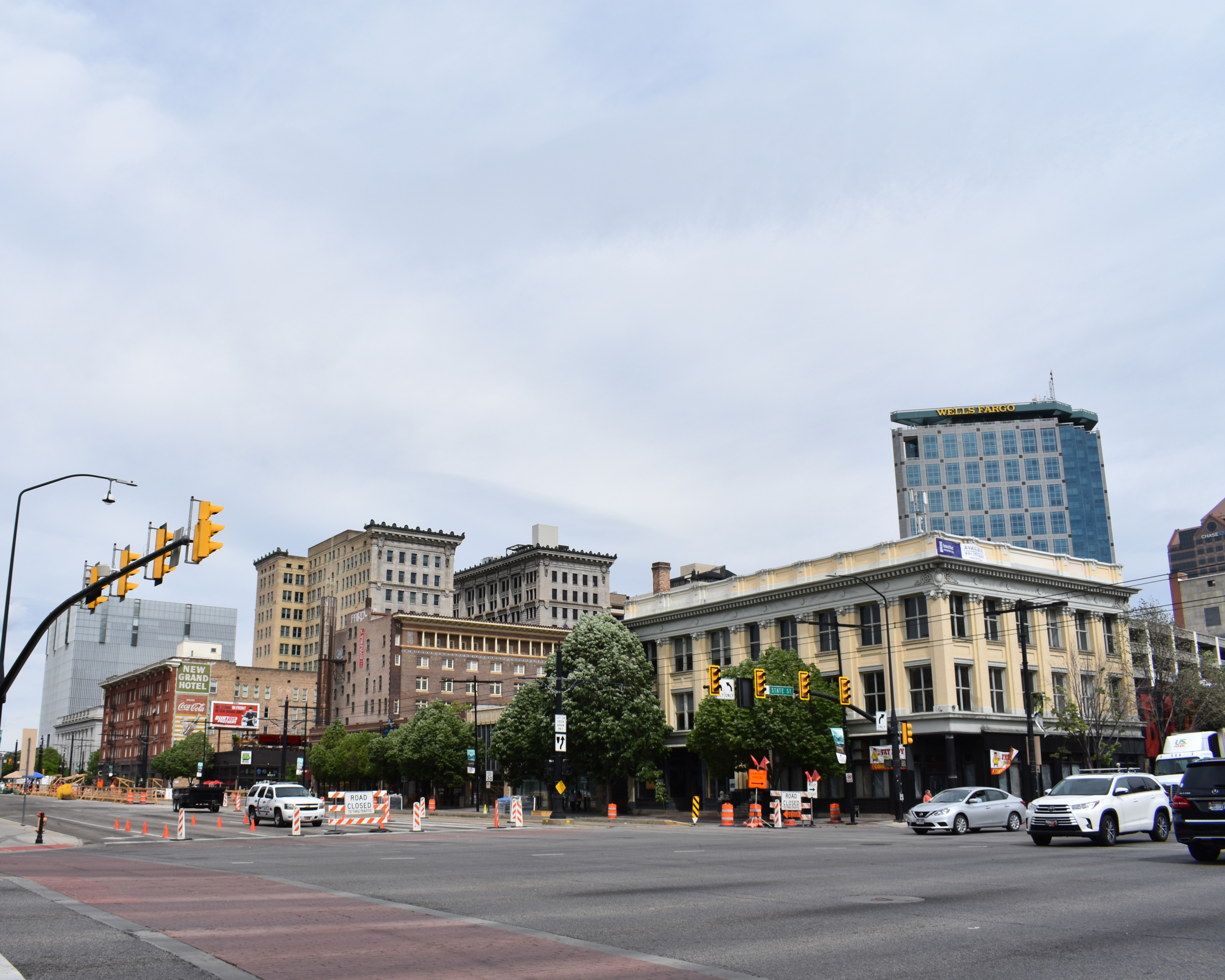
Hotel Plandome (foreground right) and Exchange Place Historic District

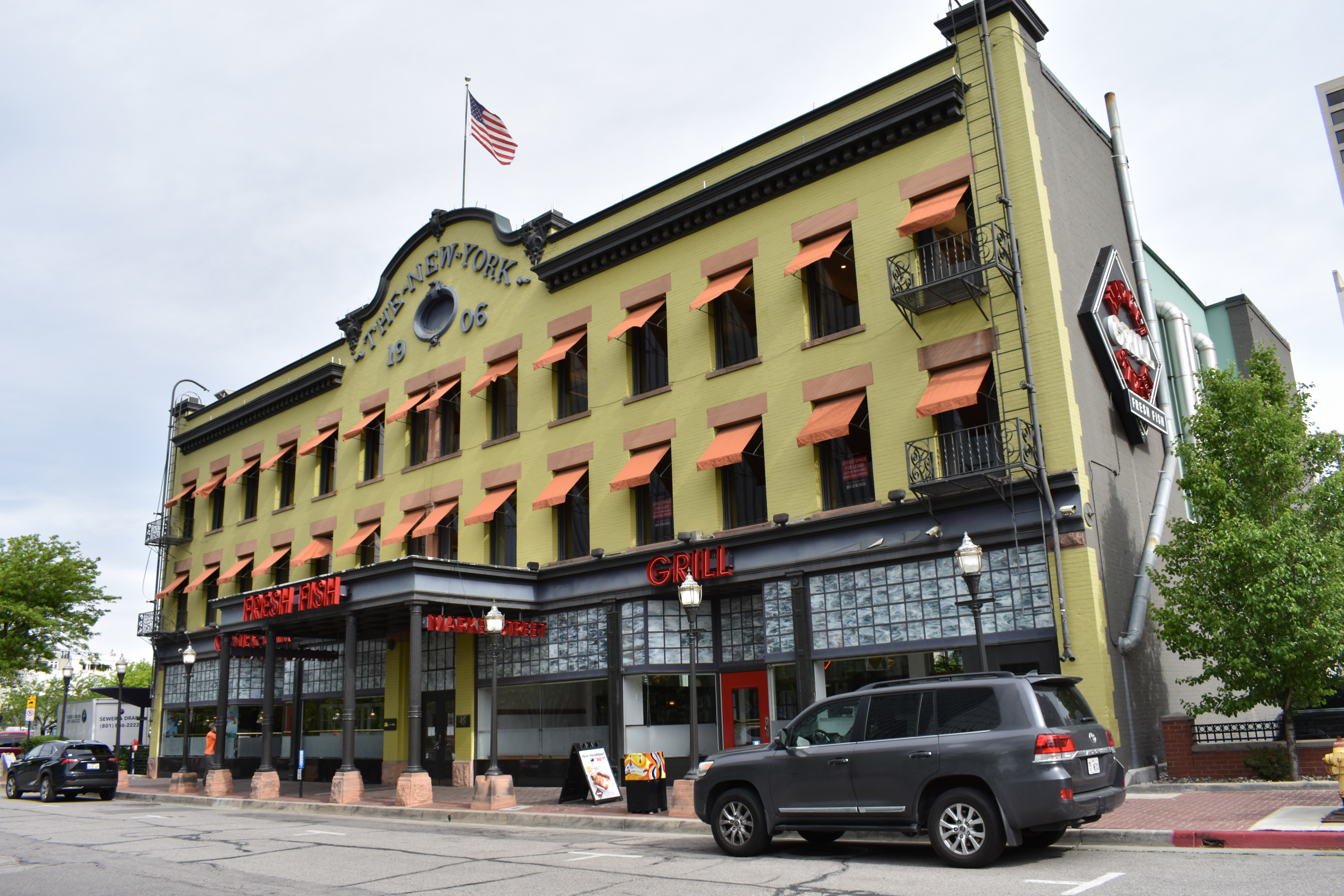
New York Hotel

== See also ==
- National Register of Historic Places listings in Salt Lake City
