= Mesa Arizona Temple =

Temple of The Church of Jesus Christ of Latter-day Saints (LDS Church)

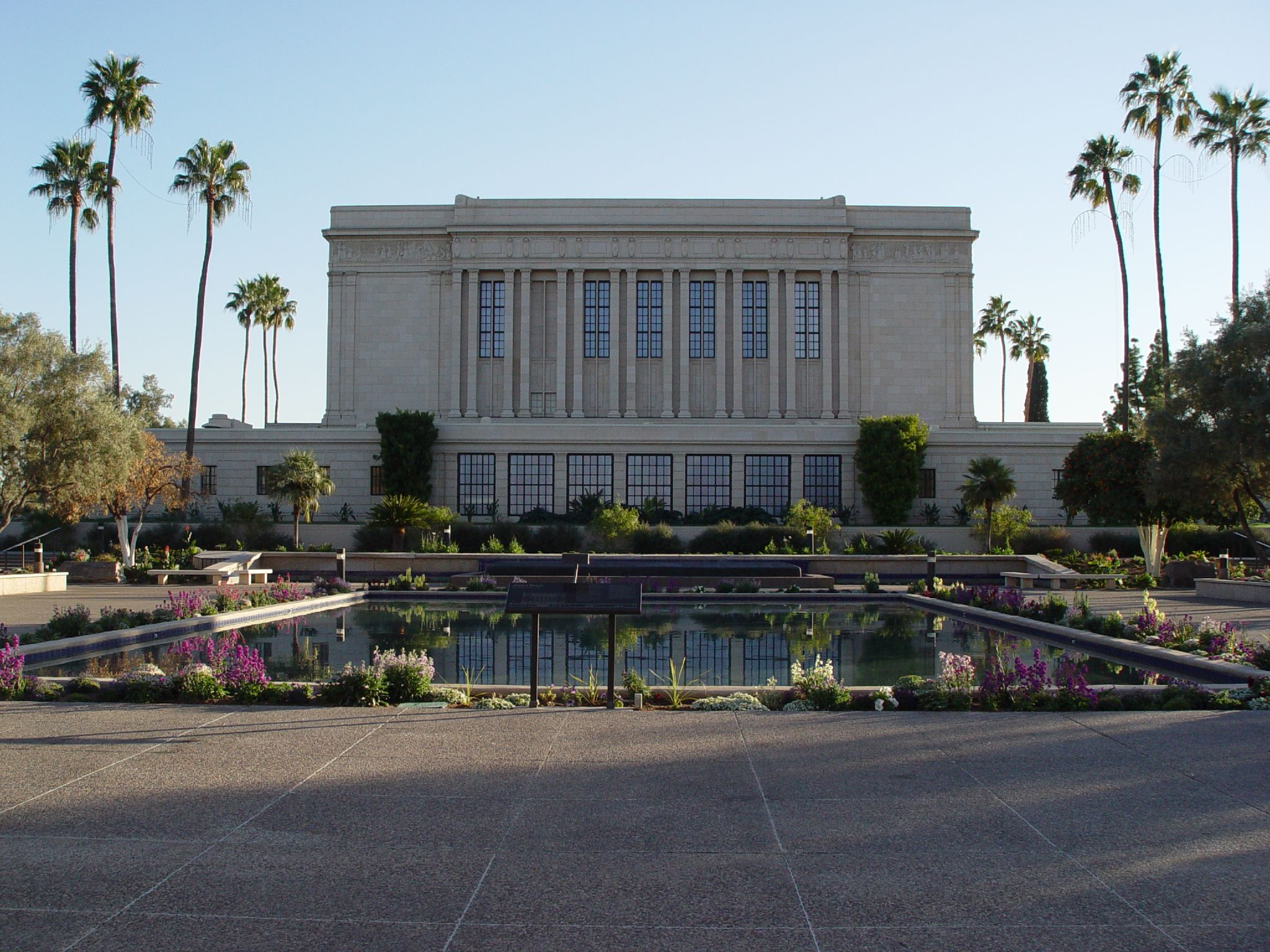
- Interactive map of Mesa Arizona Temple
- Number: 7
- Dedication: October 23, 1927, by Heber J. Grant
- Site: 20 acres (8.1 ha)
- Floor area: 113,916 ft^{2} (10,583.1 m^{2})
- Height: 50 ft (15 m)
- Official website • News & images

Church chronology
← Cardston Alberta Temple	Mesa Arizona Temple	→ Idaho Falls Idaho Temple

Additional information
- Announced: October 3, 1919, by Heber J. Grant
- Groundbreaking: April 25, 1922, by Heber J. Grant
- Open house: Tours were available upon request 1920–22; March 19 – April 3, 1975; October 16 – November 20, 2021
- Rededicated: April 16, 1975, by Spencer W. Kimball; December 12, 2021, by Dallin H. Oaks
- Designed by: Don Carlos Young, Jr. and Ramm Hansen
- Location: Mesa, Arizona, United States
- Coordinates: 33°24′46.4″N 111°49′10.5″W
- Exterior finish: Concrete
- Design: Neoclassical Architecture
- Baptistries: 1
- Ordinance rooms: 4 (stationary)
- Sealing rooms: 9
- Clothing rental: Yes
- Visitors' center: Yes
- Notes: The first temple to offer ordinances in a language other than English (Spanish).

The Mesa Arizona Temple (formerly the Arizona Temple; nicknamed the Lamanite Temple) is the seventh operating temple of the Church of Jesus Christ of Latter-day Saints. The intent to build the temple was announced on October 1, 1919, by church president Heber J. Grant, during general conference. Located in the city of Mesa, Arizona, it is the first of the church's nine temples built or planned in the state as of September 2025, with three of those in Maricopa County. A groundbreaking ceremony was held on April 25, 1922, and the dedication, conducted by Grant, was on October 23, 1927.

== History ==
The intent to construct the temple was announced by Heber J. Grant on October 1, 1919, only seven years after Arizona achieved statehood. As one of the first constructed by the church, it was one of three built to serve outlying Latter-day Saint settlements in the early part of the century, the others being constructed in Laie, Hawaii and Cardston, Alberta. Similar to the Cardston Alberta Temple, the church held a competition for the design of the temple between three Salt Lake firms. The winning design was proposed by Don Carlos Young Jr. and Ramm Hansen. While none of the three settlements were particularly large, they were considered thriving centers of Latter-day Saint population. The long and arduous trip to existing temples in the state of Utah was costly and even dangerous for the faithful of that era, and temple attendance has always been an important part of worship in the faith. As a result, it was seen as necessary to construct temples for those communities.

Prior to its construction, church members journeyed more than 400 miles by wagon to reach the St. George Utah Temple. The route became so frequently traveled by couples that it earned the nickname the “Honeymoon Trail."

Numerous colonies were set up in Arizona by the church during the last half of the nineteenth century. Plans had been discussed for a temple in the state as early as 1908, but the start of World War I stopped these for a while. The plan to build a temple in Mesa was finally announced on October 1, 1919, and a 20-acre (81,000 m^{2}) site was selected and procured in 1921. The site was dedicated on November 28, 1921, and the groundbreaking ceremony took place on April 25, 1922, conducted by Grant.

In a departure from the style of prior temples, the Mesa temple (along with the temples in Laie and Cardston) was built in a neoclassical style suggestive of the Temple in Jerusalem, lacking the spires that have become a mainstay of temples built since then. The temple features the primary structure atop a pedestal, a frieze, pilasters with Corinthian capitals (12 pair along the long side and 10 pair along the short side) and amphorae on fluted columns on the grounds. Below the cornice, eight frieze panels (carved in low relief) depict the gathering of God's people from the Old and New World, and the Pacific Islands to America.

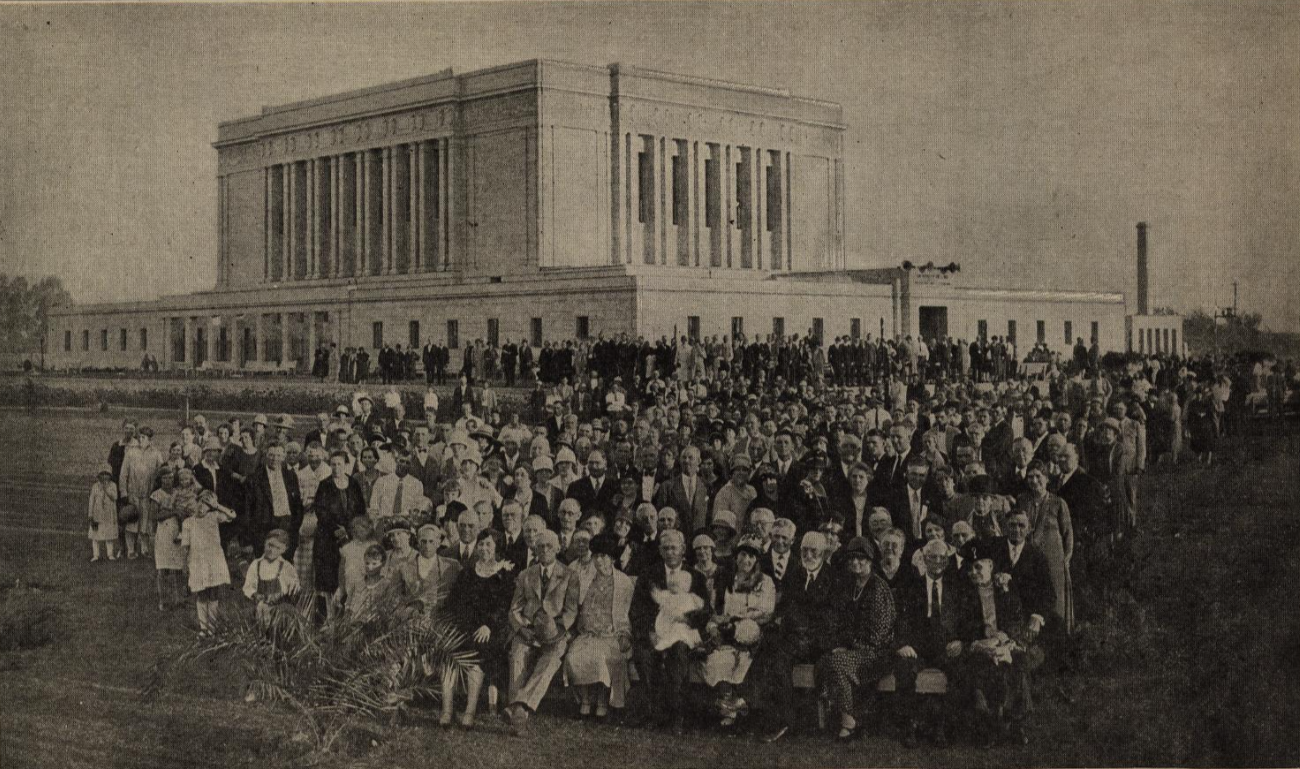
At the temple dedication with Heber J. Grant in the foreground

When construction was finished, public tours of the temple were held. The dedication spanned four days, drawing nationwide attention. On the second day, a choir of 300 Arizonans sang hymns. One member of the choir was 32 year old Spencer W. Kimball. In total, two hundred thousand people toured the temple.

The temple was dedicated on October 23, 1927, by Heber J. Grant. By that afternoon, the temple was in use. In 1945, the temple became the first to offer temple ordinances in Spanish, the first language other than English.

== Design and architecture ==
The Mesa Arizona Temple has a distinctive architectural style, blending neoclassical architecture with traditional temple design. Designed by Don Carlos Young Jr. and Ramm Hansen, its architecture reflects the cultural heritage of the local area.

Located on a 113,916 square feet (10,583.1 m^{2}) 20-acre (8.1 ha) site, the temple is two stories tall and is constructed with concrete and terracotta tiles. The exterior has a flat roof with sculpted friezes, while interior elements include hand painted murals, a grand central staircase, and stained glass.

The temple has four ordinance rooms, six sealing rooms, and a baptistry. It also has eight friezes, representing the nations “gathering” from the four corners of the earth. The friezes represent the pioneer heritage of the church community, depicting Europeans, Native Americans, and Pacific Islanders. The design also uses Solomon's temple and prophecies from the book of Isaiah in the Bible.

The landscaping around the temple grounds has geometric patterns aligned with the cardinal directions and consists of thematic gardens and reflective pools. The gardens surround the temple, with flower beds, terraces, and reflective pools. The greenery includes trees and shrubs from five continents, symbolizing the unity and diversity of global cultures. The desert plants and cacti in the gardens represent the local Native Americans and Mexican communities that were important to the growth of the church.

== Renovations ==
The temple was closed in February 1974, to add new technology to the ordinance rooms, along with a new entrance and an additional 17,000 square feet (1,600 m^{2}). This provided larger dressing rooms and increased the number of ordinance rooms. Spencer W. Kimball re-dedicated the temple on April 16, 1975.

In May 2018, the temple was again closed for significant renovation. It was rededicated by Dallin H. Oaks on December 12, 2021. Prior to the rededication, a public open house was held from October 16 to November 20 (except Sundays), with a youth devotional on December 11.

This renovation focused on several key areas, including upgrading utilities, preserving and restoring artwork, and adding a new irrigation system for the gardens. The updated temple grounds feature over 300 olive and palm trees, an expanded reflection pool, and a new irrigation system that conserves water in the desert climate. Conservators undertook the task of safeguarding and reviving the artwork by stripping away layers of added paint and alterations, securing the canvas onto the wall, and repairing damaged areas. These changes were made to comply with contemporary building standards.

One aspect of the renovation was the reconfiguration of the grounds to improve the Mesa Easter Pageant, staged in an open area north of the temple with a platform stage and grassy area for 9,000+ chairs. The new stage faces west so patrons can view the pageant productions with the sun to their backs instead of their faces.

Throughout the renovation, care was taken to maintain the temple's historical and spiritual significance. Artisans and craftsmen specializing in preservation and restoration were employed to ensure that both the exterior and interior renovations were in keeping with the original design ethos while incorporating modern advancements.

The church, through its real estate arm, redeveloped 4.5 acres (1.8 ha) of land near the temple. They replaced run-down buildings with new structures, including retail storefronts, a clubhouse, a pool, a fitness center, and pedestrian walkways. The church explained the reasons as redevelopment around the temple grounds, and to stimulate the local economy. Much of the work was completed during the COVID-19 pandemic. This development included 240 apartments, 12,500 square feet (1,160 m^{2}) of ground floor retail space, 70,000 square feet (6,500 m^{2}) of landscaped open space, and underground parking. The Salt Lake Tribune said: "The makeover has revived an area in desperate need of a boost." The Mayor of Mesa, John Giles, said the church's decision to invest in the area sent a positive signal to other investors.

== Cultural and community impact ==
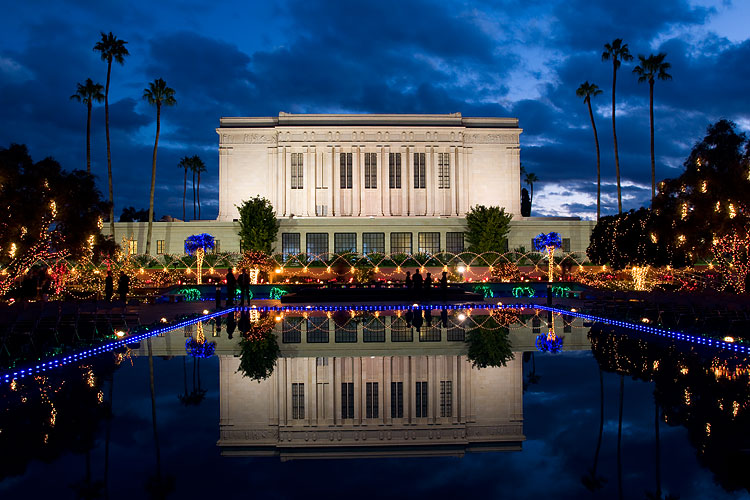
Christmas Lights at the Temple

Since 1979, there has been an annual Christmas lights display with a nativity scene during the Christmas season, attracting more than 1 million guests every year. Since 1938, the temple has hosted an Easter pageant, entitled Jesus the Christ, between late March and early April, which attracts nearly 100,000 people annually and is the "largest annual outdoor Easter pageant in the world."

Additionally, the temple's presence has contributed to the local economy, with investments and redevelopment of areas surrounding the temple, facilitating economic growth and rejuvenation along Main Street.

Just north of the temple is a visitors' center. The original visitors' center was located near the west entrance of the temple in the late 1940s, which consisted of tables and literature racks. Across the street was the Bureau of Information and Genealogical Library. Due to inadequacies to meet demand, a new building was constructed and dedicated by church president David O. McKay on December 30, 1956. An expansion of the building was completed in 1981 to house new exhibits, and was again remodeled in 2015.

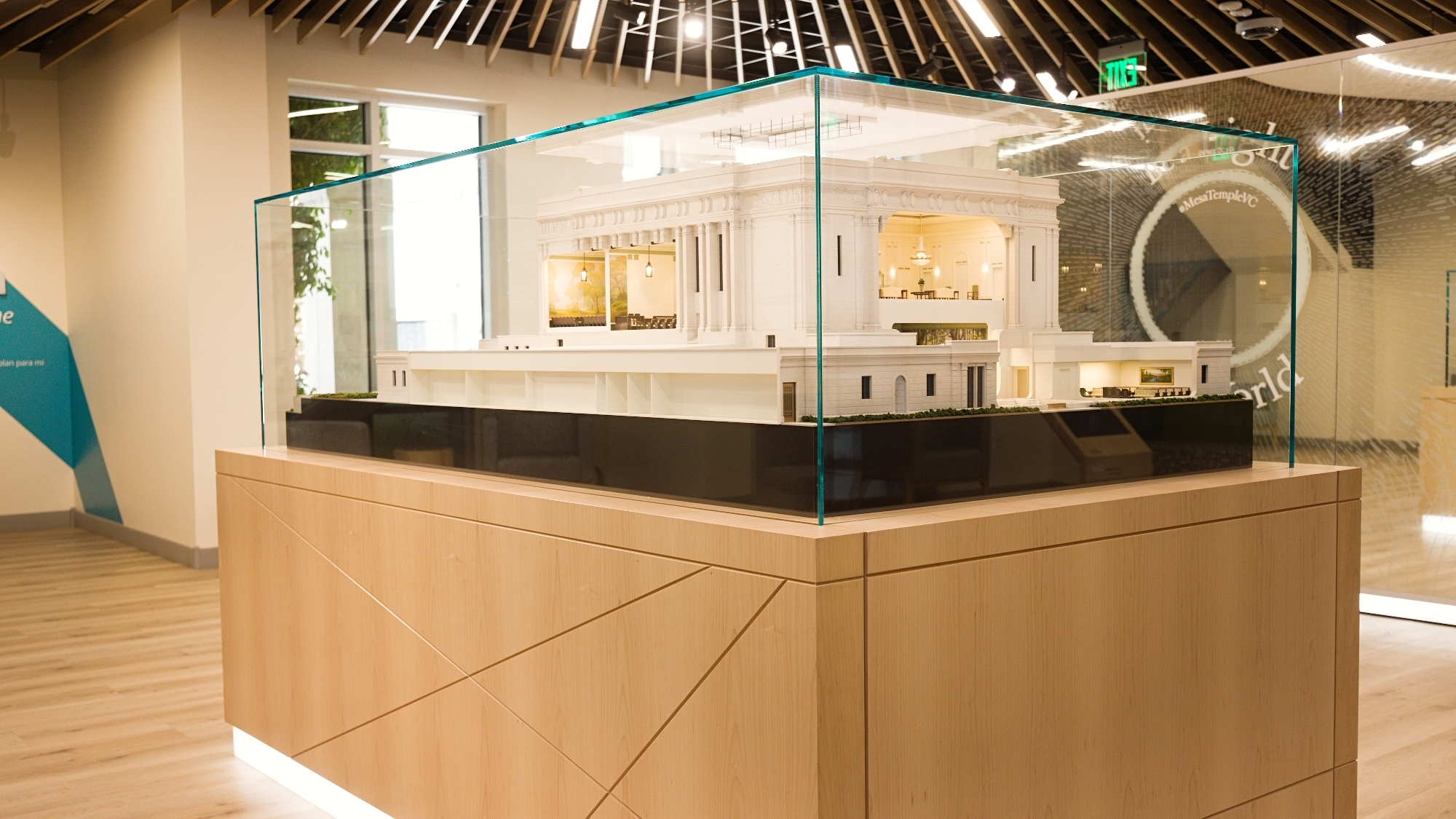
3D Scale Model of Mesa Temple

As part of a larger plan to renovate the temple, the original visitors' center was demolished in 2018. A new 18,000 square foot visitors' center and interactive Family History Discovery Center were built. The new visitors’ center was dedicated by Ulisses Soares on August 12, 2021. It is located in the northwest side of the Mesa Temple, in the corner of Main Street and Lesueur. It includes a children’s play area, with interactive activities; a hang out room for teens; a community section, with displays explaining the city's diverse history and spiritual heritage built by Native Americans, Hispanic migrants and Mormon pioneers. There is also a coloring wall, an interactive justserve.org screen to locate local community service opportunities, a 3D scale model of the temple, and a display where visitors learn more about God and Jesus Christ. Other areas include teaching rooms with videos and individual reflection pods.

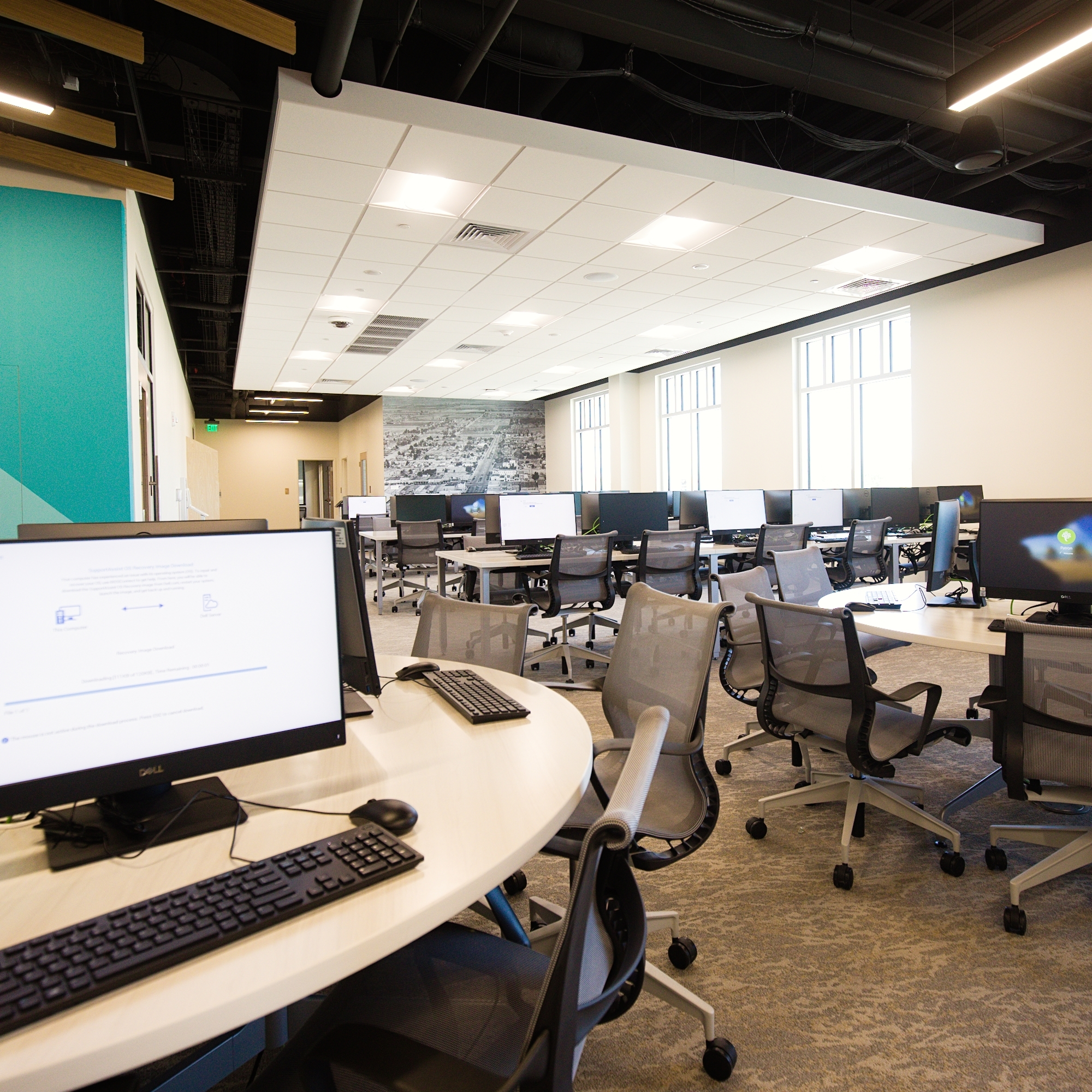
Mesa Temple Visitor Center Family Research Area

There is also a family research area with computer work stations and helpers where guests can work at their own pace researching, adding to their family history, and connecting their family tree. The visitors' center also houses a replica of a statue of Jesus Christ by Danish artist Bertel Thorvaldsen called the Christus. The visitors' centers and grounds are staffed by the church's missionaries and the public can walk the temple grounds and enjoy the gardens.

== Admittance and use ==
Originally dedicated in 1927 and then rededicated in 2021, the temple is a central place of worship and spiritual ceremonies for church members. Like all temples of the church, it is not used for Sunday worship services. To members of the church, temples are regarded as sacred houses of the Lord. Church members with a current temple recommend can enter for worship.

The temple is used for living and proxy ordinances such as baptisms for the dead, endowments, and sealings which are fundamental to church doctrine of eternal families and personal salvation.

Before its dedication, the temple was open to the public for one month to allow individuals of all faiths to experience the temple's architecture and learn about the sacred functions it would perform.

The temple's dedication by Heber J. Grant was held on October 23, 1927. The rededication of the temple by Dallin H. Oaks was held on December 12, 2021.

== Temple presidents ==
Since its dedication in 1927, it has been overseen by a series of temple presidents, each serving for a term of about three years, with the exception of the first few presidents who served seven to nine years. The first president, David K. Udall, served from 1927 to 1934. Temple presidents include Junius E. Driggs (1975–80) and L. Kenyon Udall (1997–2000). As of September 2024, Richard M. Gulbrandsen is the president, with Karen S. Gulbrandsen being the matron.

== See also ==
Temples in Arizona ()
- = Operating
- = Under construction
- = Announced
- = Temporarily Closed

- Comparison of temples of The Church of Jesus Christ of Latter-day Saints
- Torleif S. Knaphus – sculptor who created the eight friezes in the ornamental band around the tops of the north and south outside walls
- List of temples of The Church of Jesus Christ of Latter-day Saints
- List of temples of The Church of Jesus Christ of Latter-day Saints by geographic region
- Temple architecture (Latter-day Saints)
- The Church of Jesus Christ of Latter-day Saints in Arizona
