= Federal Reserve Bank of San Francisco Salt Lake City Branch =

One of four branches of the Federal Reserve Bank of San Francisco

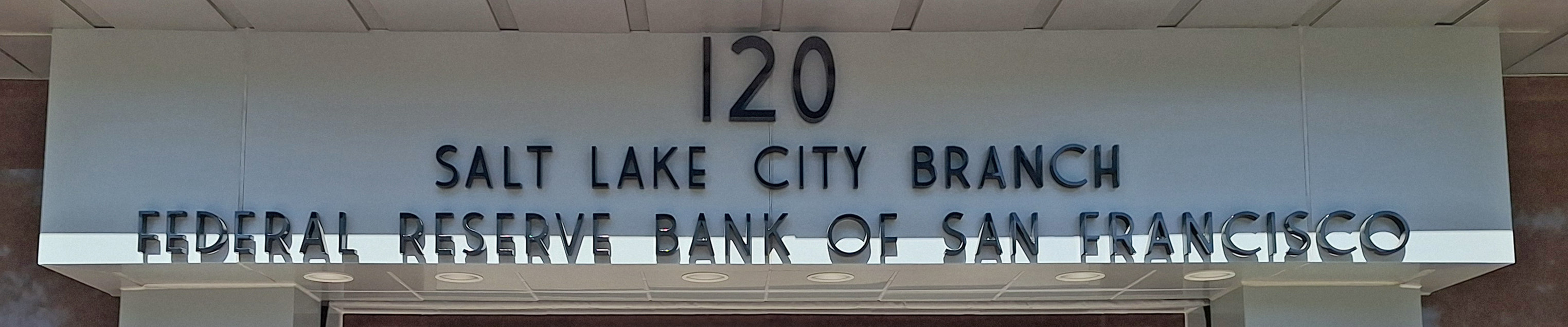
Signage above the branch's entrance

The Federal Reserve Bank of San Francisco Salt Lake City Branch is one of four branches of the Federal Reserve Bank of San Francisco. The branch opened in 1918 and is located in downtown Salt Lake City, Utah, United States. As of 2024, the branch provides outreach, cash operations, police services, supervision, and credit for financial institutions in Utah, southern Idaho, eastern Nevada, eastern Oregon, and western Wyoming.

== History ==
Prior to the branch, banks in Utah and the surrounding areas complained that the distance to San Francisco was too great, and to prevent runs they had to keep larger than normal amounts of cash on hand, as it took more than 10 days to get funds from the Federal Reserve Bank of San Francisco. That, along with other issues, led them to petition the Federal Reserve to open a branch in Salt Lake City.

After a branch was assured, John U. Calkins, a member of the board of governors for the San Francisco bank, arrived in Salt Lake City during March 1918 to locate a building to house the branch. The branch opened on April 1, 1918, with William A. Day as manager.

== Buildings ==
The branch has been housed in four different buildings in the downtown area, all within a few blocks of each other:

=== Moran building (1918) ===
When the branch first opened, it did so in the leased Moran building at 160 South Main Street. The building had formerly housed financial institutions and already contained a vault.

=== Deseret National Bank building (1918–1927) ===
In December 1918, or soon after, the branch moved into the newly built Deseret National Bank building on the northeast corner of the intersection of Main Street and 100 South. It was housed on the third floor of the office building.

=== 70 East South Temple (1927–1959) ===
70 East South Temple
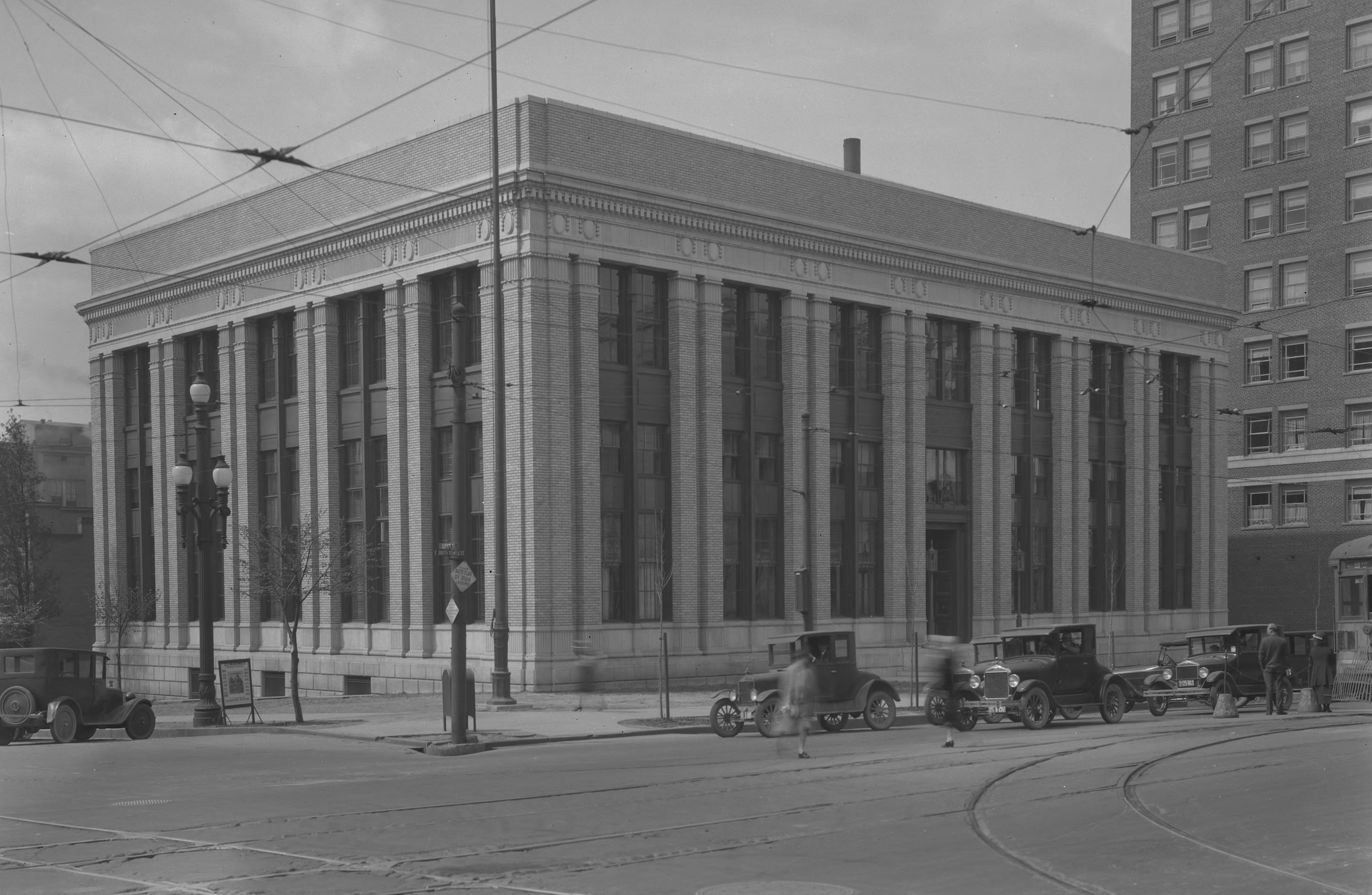
- Salt Lake City Branch building (1927–1959)
- Interactive map of the 70 East South Temple area

General information
- Status: Demolished
- Location: 70 East South Temple, Salt Lake City
- Coordinates: 40°46′8.83″N 111°53′19.15″W
- Groundbreaking: January 25, 1926
- Opened: February 21, 1927
- Demolished: 1984
- Cost: $400,000 (equivalent to $7,413,793 in 2025)

Design and construction
- Architects: Ramm Hansen, Don Carlos Young Jr. and Harry P. Poll
- Main contractor: P. J. (Percival John) Walker and Company, San Francisco

In February 1921, the Federal Reserve acquired the historic Gardo House from the Church of Jesus Christ of Latter-day Saints (LDS Church) for $115,000 (equivalent to $2,075,793 in 2025). The mansion sat on the southwest corner of the prominent intersection of State Street and South Temple, and it was the intention of the bank to construct a new building on the site, as its quarters in the Deseret National Bank building were too small. The Gardo House was demolished starting in November 1921.

After several years of political delays, approval was granted for the new building in January 1926, and ground was broken for construction on January 25. The building was designed by local architects Ramm Hansen, Don Carlos Young Jr. and Harry P. Poll, with P. J. (Percival John) Walker and Company, of San Francisco, managing construction.

The new building opened on February 21, 1927. The structure was two stories in height, with a basement; its exterior was glazed granite brick with terracotta cornice and trimmings, and it included a large bronze entrance along South Temple. The building was made to be fire resistant, and included metal furniture. The branch also had a telegraph system with direct connections to other Federal Reserve banks, along with a telephone switchboard. The building's final cost was nearly $400,000 (equivalent to $7,413,793 in 2025). Prior to the opening, $12,000,000 (equivalent to $222,413,793 in 2025) in cash and securities was moved to the new structure from the Deseret National Bank building. This was done under the watch of city detectives, police, marines, secret service, and regular bank guards and employees. With the opening of the new building, Salt Lake City became the first branch of the San Francisco bank to have its own, purpose-built structure. An official celebration for the opening was held March 5, which included a dinner at the nearby Hotel Utah.

After the Federal Reserve branch was moved from the building in 1959, it was purchased by Zions Security Corporation, a for-profit entity owned by the LDS Church. The church's financial department, along with offices for Zions First National Bank, then moved into the building. After the completion of the Church Office Building, the church's financial department moved out and the Bank of Utah moved in. This structure was demolished in 1984 to make way for the Eagle Gate Plaza and Tower (currently called the World Trade Center at City Creek). During demolition, it took three weeks of battering with a wrecking ball to break up the vault into small enough pieces to be hauled away. The original bronze door frame from the bank's entrance was incorporated into the entrance of the new office tower.

=== 120 South State Street (1959–present) ===
120 South State Street
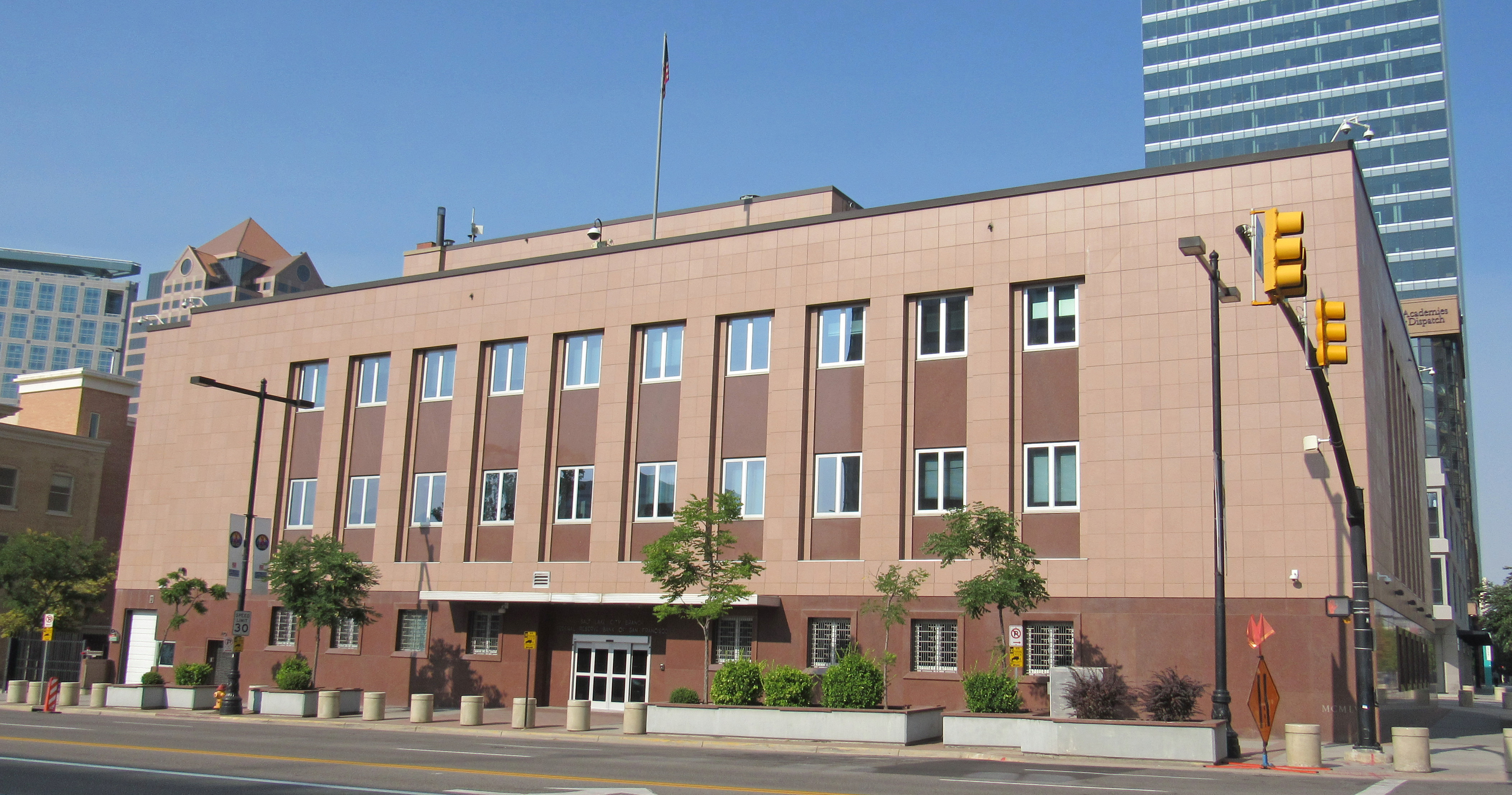
- Salt Lake City Branch building (1959–present)
- Interactive map of the 120 South State Street area

General information
- Status: Completed
- Location: 120 South State Street, Salt Lake City
- Coordinates: 40°46′0.38″N 111°53′19.19″W
- Year built: 1957–1959
- Opened: May 22, 1959

Design and construction
- Architect: Ashton, Evans and Brazier
- Main contractor: Tolboe & Harlin Construction Company

By the 1950s the South Temple building was in need of a remodel. But plans changed when an employee at Zion's Savings Bank & Trust Company helped broker a deal where the Federal Reserve would purchase property (from Zions Security Corporation) one block south of its then-current building. After the bank had built a new structure on that property, it would then sell its old building to Zions Security Corporation.

Construction of the new building started in summer 1957. By November, the underground stories had largely been built up, with construction reaching the ground level. The cornerstone, which included a time capsule, was placed on August 8, 1958.

On the night of May 22, 1959, all money from the old building was transferred to the new building. During the move, police, agents and guards closed the sidewalks and street, keeping people away from the secret, hour-long operation (and in some cases preventing them from leaving nearby buildings), while shooters were positioned along the route. The bank did not indicate how much money was transferred. Business and community leaders were invited to an open house in the new building, held on June 3, 1959.

The structure was designed by the architectural firm Ashton, Evans and Brazier and built by Tolboe & Harlin Construction Company; both local companies. It contains six levels, three of which are underground. A 5,700-square-foot (530 m^{2}), three-level vault extends through the basement levels, and was constructed on separate footings from the main building. The upper levels are not supported by the vault, a design feature in case the building were to be bombed. Armored trucks delivering money are able to drive down into an underground court which is equipped with a turntable to flip the vehicles back around.

== Current Board of Directors ==
The following people are on the board of directors as of 2024:

=== Appointed by the Board of Governors of the Federal Reserve System ===
Appointed by the Board of Governors of the Federal Reserve System
Name	Title	Term Expires
O. Randall Woodbury (Chair of the Board)	President and Chief Executive Officer, Woodbury Corporation Salt Lake City, Utah	2024
Vacant		2025
Susan Morris	Executive Vice President and Chief Operating Officer, Albertsons Boise, Idaho	2026

=== Appointed by the San Francisco Board of Directors ===
Appointed by the San Francisco Board of Directors
Name	Title	Term Expires
Lisa Grow	President and Chief Executive Officer, IDACORP and Idaho Power Boise, Idaho	2024
Jose Enriquez	Chief Executive Officer, Latinos in Action Sandy, Utah	2025
Melanie Cox	Chief Executive Officer, Backcountry.com Park City, Utah	2026
Mark Packard	President and Chief Executive Officer, Central Bank Provo, Utah	2026

== See also ==
- Federal Reserve Act
- Federal Reserve
- Structure of the Federal Reserve System
- Federal Reserve Bank
  - Federal Reserve Branches
- Federal Reserve Bank of San Francisco
  - Federal Reserve Bank of San Francisco Los Angeles Branch
  - Federal Reserve Bank of San Francisco Portland Branch
  - Federal Reserve Bank of San Francisco Seattle Branch
- Wallace F. Bennett Federal Building - houses federal agencies in downtown Salt Lake City across from the bank
