= International Man of the Year =

The International Man of the Year award may refer to an award given by

- GQ, an international monthly men's magazine
- American Biographical Institute, a paid-inclusion vanity biographical reference directory publisher
- International Biographical Centre, a publisher owned by Melrose Press Ltd that specializes in producing biographical publications
