= Igusa =

Igusa, い草 or 井草, いぐさ (soft rush, lit. well grass) is a Japanese name. It may refer to:

== Place name ==
- Igusa High School, a high school in Nerima, Tokyo
- Igusa, former village in Saitama Prefecture
- Igusa, Suginami, Tokyo with Kami-Igusa (Upper Igusa) and Shimo-Igusa (Lower Igusa) train stations in Suginami, Tokyo

== Surname ==
- Jun-ichi Igusa (井草 準一 Igusa Jun’ichi), d. 2013, Japanese mathematician at Johns Hopkins University
- Kiyoshi Igusa, Japanese-American mathematician and professor at Brandeis University, son of Jun-ichi Igusa
- Mutsuko Igusa, current publisher of Nihon Tarento Meikan, a directory of Japanese television personalities
- Shigetaro Igusa, founder of "Leisure Tsūshin-sha", now "VIP Times", publishers of Nihon Tarento Meikan

== Fictional characters ==
- Igusa, green-haired character from the light novel, manga, and anime series Inukami!
