= Devi Sharma =

Devi Sharma may refer to:

- Devi Sharma (filmmaker) (1921–2010), Indian film director, writer and producer
- Devi Dutt Sharma (born 1924), Indian scholar and writer
