= Edward Manukyan =

U.S Composer

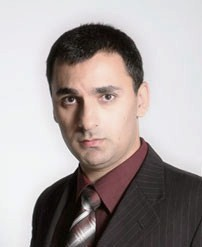
- Born: July 27, 1981 (age 44)
- Occupation: composer

Edward Manukyan (born July 27, 1981) is a composer from Southern California, United States. His main works are orchestral and chamber compositions, which lean heavily upon elements of Armenian national folklore.

== Early life ==
It was not until his last years in high school that Manukyan showed interest in composing music. In 1997, he won state scholarship to study languages and psychology at the Yerevan State Linguistic University. During his student years, he committed himself to studying music and immediately began concentrating on composition. He became a member of local chamber orchestras, writing material for their repertoires. He also formed his own jazz quartet and gave concerts at various venues in Yerevan.

== Career ==
Upon moving to California in 2002, Manukyan shifted his interests towards contemporary classical music after studying the works of his compatriot Aram Khachaturian. A cover-story article in the Glendale News-Press, published on October 23, 2007, shed some light on the composer's unusual start in classical music.

In 2004, Manukyan took composition classes from Rowan Taylor and went on to further study with composers John Kennedy and James Newton. He earned his master's degree in Music Composition from the California State University, Los Angeles (2007). Since then, the composer has been collaborating with musicians from all continents, engaging them in concerts, lecture-recitals, and other events. Manukyan has dedicated many of his compositions to scientists, such as biologists James D. Watson, Francis Crick, physicists Steven Weinberg, Richard Feynman, linguist Noam Chomsky, and astronomer Victor Ambartsumian. He created a project called "Musical Tribute To Scientists and Other People of Reason", which includes lectures on science and philosophy, along with performances of his music. Among the events presented by the project (organized by MIT and Harvard University) was an honorary concert for Noam Chomsky, at Kresge Auditorium, in Cambridge, MA. Manukyan's activism for science is often balanced with his anti-war rhetoric, which could be heard in songs he wrote on words by Chomsky, Bertrand Russell, Andrei Sakharov and others. The scientists celebrated in his concert series are usually known for their activism and struggle for human rights and civil liberties.

== Style and influences ==
Edward Manukyan's compositional style was mainly influenced by the middle-generation Soviet composers, such as Aram Khachaturian, Dmitry Shostakovich and Sergey Prokofiev, as well as the Armenian successors of their traditions, Alexander Arutiunian, Edvard Mirzoyan, Tigran Mansuryan, etc. Later he drew influences from Béla Bartók and Igor Stravinsky, striving for a contemporary style that is accessible for larger audiences, in part due to its closeness to Armenian folk music.

== Main works ==
=== Orchestral ===
- Concerto for piano and orchestra (2004)
- Three Pieces, for orchestra (2005)
- Images of Armenia, suite for orchestra (2005)
  - Dance-Introduction
  - Fanfare of Nostalgia
  - Capriccio
  - Romance
  - Patriotic March
- Hello, Armenia!, overture for symphony orchestra (2005)
- Elegia for wind orchestra (2006)
- Symphony No. 1 (2006)

=== Chamber ===
- Suite for brass quartet Nos. 1 & 2 (2005)
- Brass Quintet (2005)
- Song and Dance, for violin and piano (2005)
- Concerto for chamber ensemble (2006)
- Trio for clarinet, violin and piano (2007)
- Esquisse, for violin and piano (2007)
- Miniature, for clarinet and piano (2007)
- Three Scenes From a Peasant's Life, for solo violin (2007)
- Double Helix, for clarinet and violin (2008)

=== Piano ===
- Caucasian Waltz (2003)
- Dance for piano duo (2003)
- Elegia (2006)
- Ten Pieces for piano (2006)

=== Vocal ===
- Songs on words by Armenian poets, for voice and piano (2006)
- Five Songs, for voice and piano (2006)
- Three Songs About Love, for high voice and piano (2008)
- Three Passions, for high voice and piano (2009)
