= Cambridge Who's Who =

American vanity publisher

- Company type: Private
- Industry: publishing
- Founded: Long Island (April 4, 1975)
- Founder: merger of Manchester Who's who and Empire Who's Who
- Headquarters: Uniondale, New York
- Area served: Worldwide, mainly English-speaking countries
- Products: Who's Who registries, available via membership
- Number of employees: ca. 150
- Subsidiaries: Metropolitan Who's Who, Marquis Who's Who
- Website: www.cambridgewhoswho.com

Cambridge Who's Who, also known as Worldwide Who's Who, is a vanity publisher based in Uniondale, New York. It describes itself as highlighting people's professional careers by publishing encapsulated biographies. For additional payment, the publisher also provides other promotional services such as press releases, videos, and Executive of the Year awards. The company is located in Uniondale, New York. As of 2010, Donald Trump Jr. was spokesman and "executive director of global branding" of the company. As of November 2016 the business was "not accredited" by the Better Business Bureau of Metropolitan New York, Long Island, and the Mid-Hudson Region.

== History ==
As of July 2006 Cambridge Who's Who was established as a merger between Empire Executive and Professional Registry, Inc. and Manchester Who's Who Registries, Inc.

In July 2007, Cambridge Who's Who completed its "acquisition" of Metropolitan Who's Who, also based on Long Island. (Cambridge's logo designs and solicitation letters are identical to Metropolitan's.)

On April 10, 2010, Cambridge Who's Who issued a Video entitled "Donald Trump Jr teams up with Cambridge Who's Who," that featured him promoting the publisher. According to Cambridge Who's Who owner Randy Narod, Trump's contract was discontinued following public criticism of photos from Trump's African hunting trip.

As of 2014, Cambridge Who's Who operated under the umbrella name of Worldwide Who's Who (Worldwide Publishing) and was primarily owned by Randy Harris Narod. Narod also owns Sugar LI (a night club in Carle Place, NY), Butera's Restaurants, DaVinci's Restaurant, Bellmore Bagel Cafe, and the Long Island Bagel Cafe chain. He famously disputed with Helmer Toro, former owner of H&H Bagels, in 2012 over a trademark issue. In 1998, Narod consented to findings that he arranged to have an imposter take the General Securities Representative Exam and the Uniform Securities Agent State Law Exam on his behalf. He was censured, fined $50,000, barred from association with any National Association of Securities Dealers member in any capacity and required to disgorge all monies earned by him while associated or otherwise employed in the securities industry.

== Controversy ==
Among the complaints leveled at the company include using hard sell tactics, charging customers hundreds of dollars for non-existing member benefits, limiting customer contact to email, being denied accreditation by the Better Business Bureau due to hundreds of confirmed complaints, changing the name of the company when complaints accumulate under the old name.

Cambridge Who's Who advertises itself as a database of professionals and "an honor limited to individuals who have demonstrated leadership and achievement in their industry and occupation". It typically solicits persons to list with an unsolicited letter proclaiming that they have been selected for the honor. The company will interview the prospective listee, after which the company will ask the listee for money.

The Guernsey States' data protection office advised the island inhabitants that the company would charge them hundreds of dollars for non-existing member benefits, even if it was advertising itself as a free service, and that any personal detail submitted to this company could be sold to other companies. It further advised that they shouldn't reply to letters from the company and shouldn't even visit its website.

Writer Beware, a watchdog group from the Science Fiction and Fantasy Writers of America, published an article from Victoria Strauss explaining that her husband had received an unsolicited email from the company just because he was inside her writer insurance. She claims that there is a network of interconnected Who's Who scam companies that keep recycling themselves, and that this company is actually the same company as Metropolitan Who's Who since their logo designs and solicitation letters are identical. She also says that the company was the result of the "merge" of Manchester Who's Who and Empire Who's Who, with the last company having many complaints registered with the Better Business Bureau. She also says that the Cambridge and Empire companies use hard-selling telephone techniques, first selling themselves as a free service, then giving a high price, and then lowering it to make people believe that they are getting a good deal. She says that the companies have many complaints against them in the internet, and that one blogger that denounced them was menaced with legal action, and another blogger was sued for $7 million in damages.

AOL's Daily Finance reports other problems: while the company's name suggests an association with Cambridge, it is actually located on Long Island, as of May 2010 the only way to contact the company was via email, and the privacy policy allows to sell the information to any third party.

In 2006, the company sued Ripoff Report and the Better Business Bureau in the United States for defamation but settled the suit in January 2008.

In early 2009, Cambridge Who's Who was involved in a breach of security. An executive, Harsharan Sethi, discovered that a set of five back up tapes, or electric storage devices, containing confidential financial information of approximately 400,000 members of Cambridge, as well as thousands of Cambridge employees, were missing and unaccounted for. Sethi urged officials of Cambridge to report the data loss to "appropriate authorities", but the officers alerted no one of the breach.

In 2010, the Better Business Bureau (BBB) labeled the company as a Who's Who scam. Hundreds of consumers filed complaints against Cambridge Who's Who with various complaint bureaus, reporting fraudulent practices. In early September 2011, the BBB reported 414 complaints filed since April 2007. Based on the confirmation and nature of these complaints, the Better Business Bureau denied accreditation to Cambridge Who's Who. As of 2012, Cambridge Who's Who had a C grade with the BBB based upon 356 complaints in 3 years.

In 2012, Cambridge Who's Who settled with the Oregon Department of Justice to pay $15,000 to Oregon consumers, to pay $13,500 to a consumer protection fund, and to bring its sales tactics into compliance with the state's fair trade practices laws.
