= Who's Who in Scotland =

Biographical dictionary series

- Title page for Who's Who in Scotland (1992-93 edition)
- Publisher: Carrick Media
- Publication date: 1986

Who's Who in Scotland is an annual biographical dictionary published since 1986 by Carrick Media. It features short biographies of about 4,000 notable Scots.

Who's Who in Scotland includes leading figures in politics, law, the churches, education, business and finance, the civil service and local government, science and medicine, the arts and sport.

Entries contain full name, address, date and place of birth, details of family, education, career, publications and recreations.

== See also ==
- Chamber's Biographical Dictionary
- Who's Who
- Dictionary of National Biography
