= Who's Who Among American High School Students =

Defunct publication

Who's Who Among American High School Students was a Who's Who-style web site and publication owned and managed by Educational Communications Inc. that listed what it claimed were high school students "who have excelled in academics, extracurricular activities and community service." The website shut down in November 2007 due to the bankruptcy of its parent firm.

== About ==
Who's Who Among American High School Students compiled and published an annual edition in which students' names and achievements are listed. According to the website, people who accept nomination for inclusion in the book are sometimes qualified for various scholarship opportunities. While there were no required fees to be considered, there was the optional purchase of the listing publication.

Who's Who Among American High School Students was one of three publications produced by Educational Communications, Inc. (ECI). ECI was part of American Achievement Corporation (AAC), located in Austin, Texas. AAC is one of 7 companies owned by Fenway Partners, based in New York City. ECI ceased operations on November 1, 2007.

== Reception ==
There was much debate over the value of the book. Although it does not cost any money to be listed, it is often categorized as a scam since it is an attempt by a private company to make money through proud parents and students who purchase the book and various memorabilia (such as a "commemorative keychain") associated with the publication in attempt at recognition. There have been concerns about how students are nominated as well as whether the listing's entries are fact-checked and accurate.

Students consented to being listed in Who's Who in the hope that the listing would be seen by college admissions offices as a significant recognition of a student's academic and extracurricular involvement. However, most admissions officers believe that the recognition has no such value and in fact some consider the "honor" to be a joke. According to the admissions vice president of Hamline University, "It's honestly something that an admissions officer typically wouldn't consider or wouldn't play into an admissions decision," adding that Who's Who... is just trying to sell books.
