= Salt Lake Theatre =

Former theatre in Salt Lake City

Coordinates: 40°46′03″N 111°53′19″W

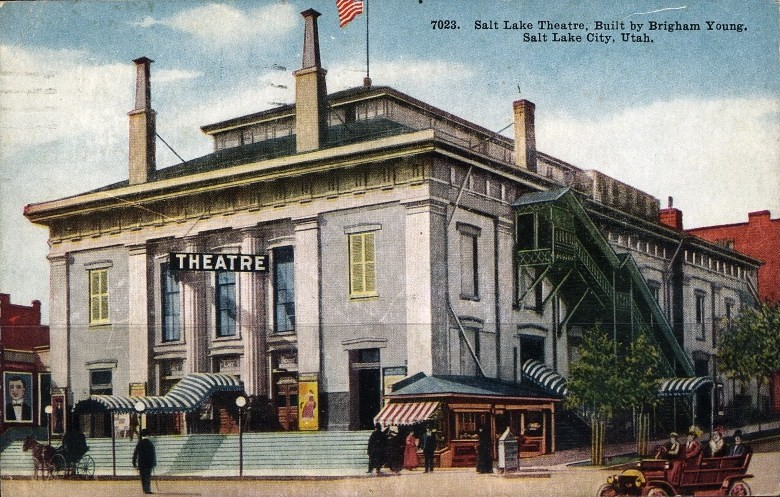
Postcard of the Salt Lake Theatre in 1920

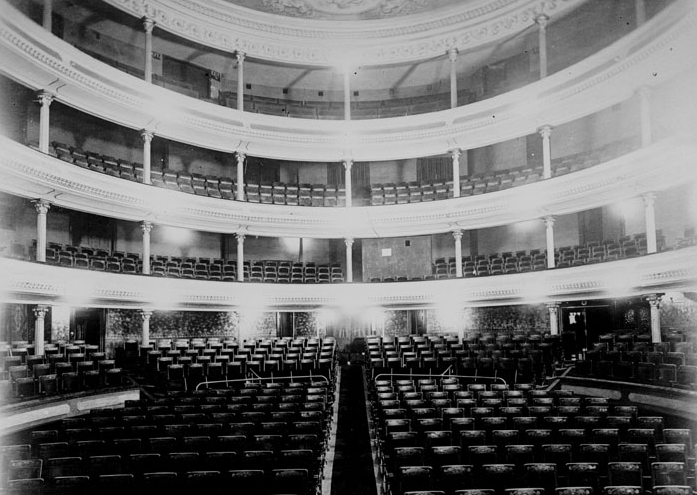
The interior of the Salt Lake Theatre

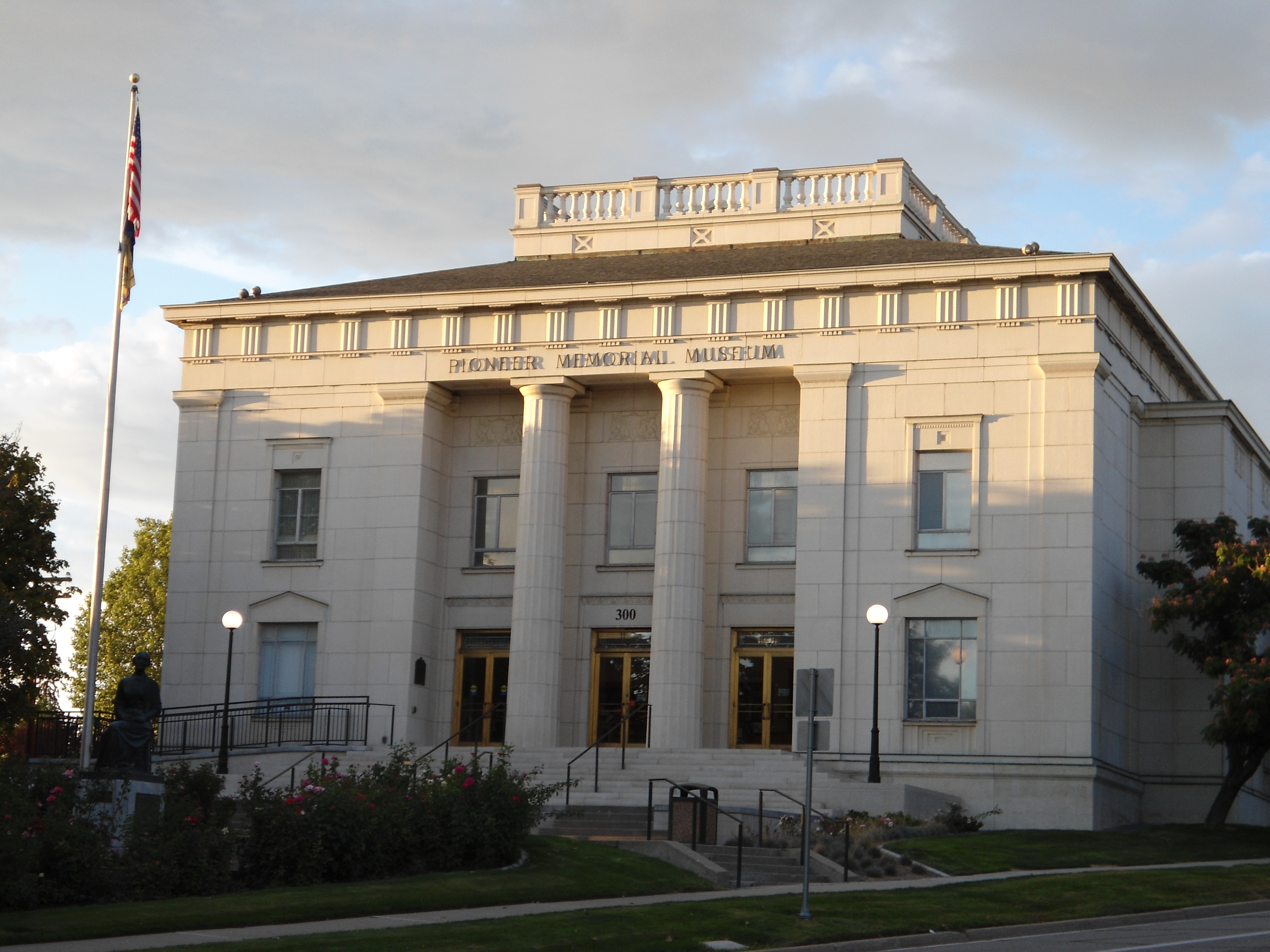
The exterior of the Pioneer Memorial Museum in Salt Lake City—a full-scale reproduction of the original Salt Lake Theatre

The Salt Lake Theatre was a 1,500 seat pioneer theatre in Salt Lake City, Utah that was built in 1862. It was located at 75 East 100 South.

== History ==
Theatre was a popular affair among the Mormon pioneers and in the years following their 1847 immigration to the Salt Lake Valley they organized various musical and theatre associations. Early productions were held in boweries on Temple Square and then after 1853, in Salt Lake's first theater, the Social Hall. As the community grew, a larger theater was envisioned and would eventually be realized as the Salt Lake Theatre.

With regard to the planning of the Salt Lake Theatre, Church leader Brigham Young was enthusiastic about the project and styled himself as "designer and general dictator of the whole affair" but in fact the exterior was designed by William H. Folsom, who became architect of the nearby Salt Lake Temple soon after completing this project, and the interior by E. L. T. Harrison based on the Drury Lane Theatre in London. Upon completion in 1862 at a cost of $100,000, it was the largest building in Utah. In his dedication speech, Henry Miller stated that the Salt Lake Theatre was “the cathedral in the desert.”

For many years, it held performances from successful local and traveling theatre companies. "Virtually every star of the American stage appeared there including Sarah Bernhardt, Ethel, John, and Lionel Barrymore, P.T. Barnum, Maude Adams, Edwin Booth, "Buffalo Bill" Cody, Al Jolson, and Lillian Russell."

With the rise of the motion picture business after World War I, the theatre's popularity waned and it accumulated substantial debt. Heber J. Grant eventually sold the theatre to Mountain States Telephone and it was razed in 1928. A few years later, the Mountain States Telephone Building was built on the site and subsequently expanded into the building that sits there today. A plaque, visible on the State Street frontage of the building, commemorates the Salt Lake Theatre.

== Legacy ==
The Pioneer Theatre Company traces its educational lineage back to the groups who performed and instructed at the Salt Lake Theatre, and the Pioneer Memorial Theatre at the University of Utah bears some resemblance to the original Salt Lake Theatre building. The Pioneer Memorial Museum building in downtown Salt Lake City is also an outward facsimile of the Salt Lake Theatre.

Longtime manager George D. Pyper wrote a history of the Salt Lake Theatre, The Romance of an Old Playhouse, published in 1928 during the last days of the theatre's operations. In the 1960s, a musical was written about the theatre called Papa and the Playhouse, authored by Albert Mitchell and L. Clair Likes. Crawford Gates directed composers such as Ardean Watts and Rowan Taylor in writing the musical scores for the production.
