= Who's Who =

Reference work on prominent people

A Who's Who (or Who Is Who) is a reference work consisting of biographical entries of notable people in a particular field. The oldest and best-known is the annual publication Who's Who, a reference work on contemporary prominent people in Britain published annually since 1849.

In addition to legitimate reference works, some Who's Who lists involve the selling of "memberships" in directories that are created online or through instant publishing services, and have been described as scams.

== Notable examples ==
This list includes examples of both respectable publications and notable scams:

- Who's Who, the oldest listing of prominent British people since 1849; people who have died since 1897 are listed in Who Was Who
- Cambridge Who's Who (also known as Worldwide Who's Who), a vanity publisher based in Uniondale, New York
- Marquis Who's Who, a series of books published since 1899 that formerly listed prominent Americans, but has become a vanity publisher that lists "relatively unaccomplished people who simply nominated themselves."
- Who's Who in New Zealand, twelve editions published at irregular intervals between 1908 and 1991
- Canadian Who's Who, a listing of prominent Canadians since 1910
- Who's Who in Switzerland, published from 1953 to 1996 and then Swiss Who's Who, a listing of prominent Swiss or leading figures living in Switzerland since 2015
- Who's Who in Australia, a listing of prominent Australians since 1923
- Who's Who in France, a listing of prominent French or people living in France since 1953 (in French)
- Who's Who in Scotland, a listing of prominent Scots since 1986
- Who's Who, by Metron Publications, a listing of prominent Greeks since 1992
- Who's Who of Southern Africa, published in paper form until 2007 when it was replaced by a website

=== Non-English publications ===
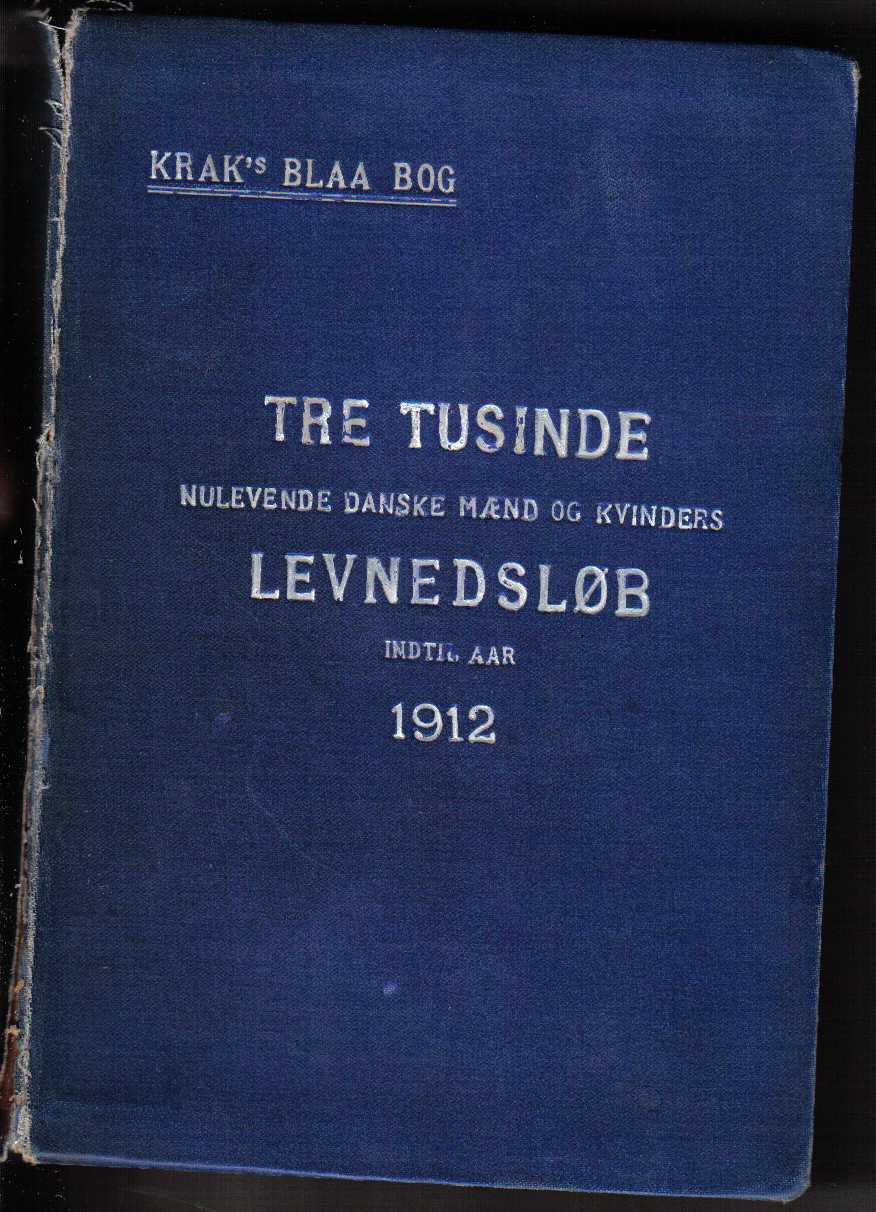
The Danish Kraks Blå Bog (1912)

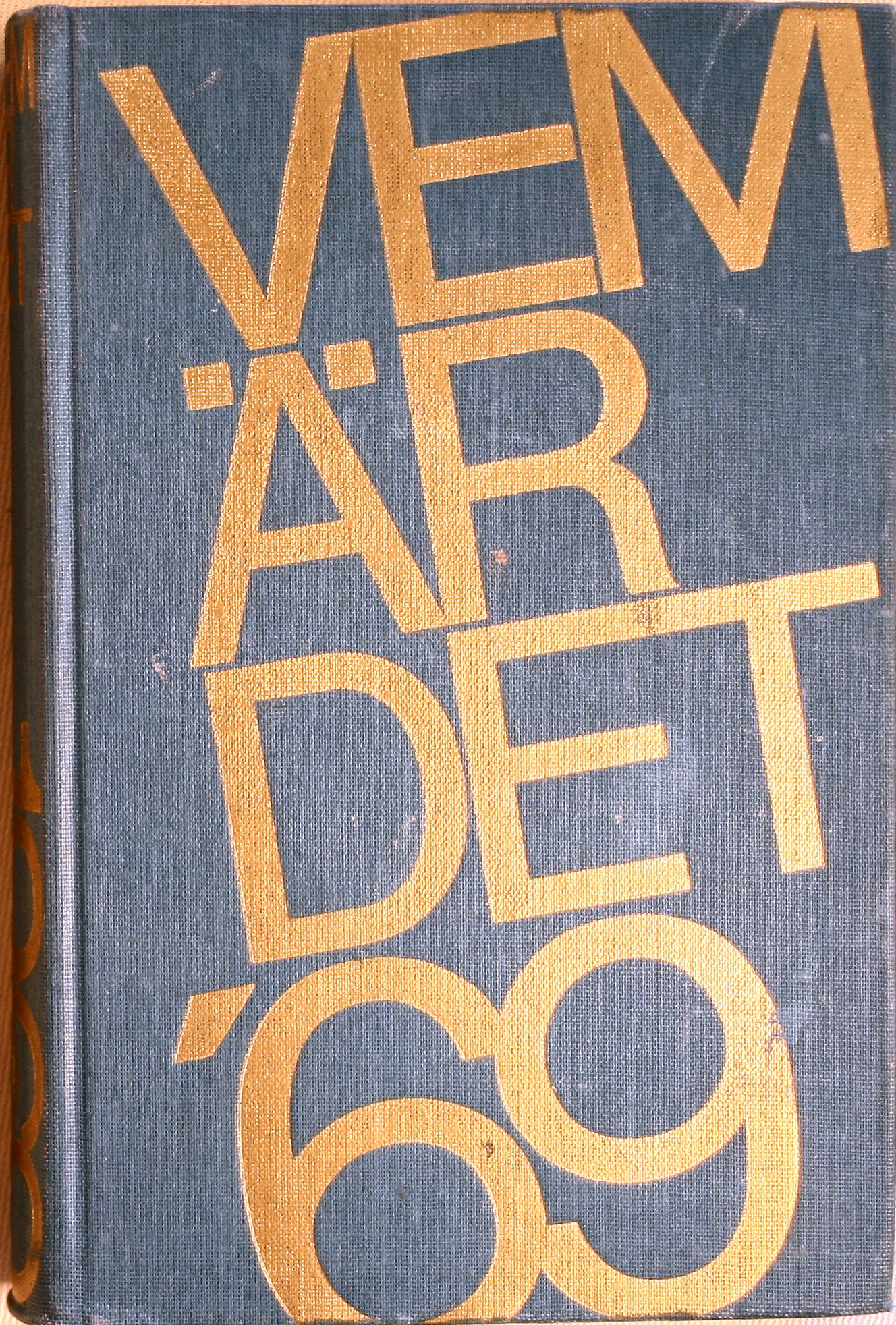
The Swedish Vem är det (1969)

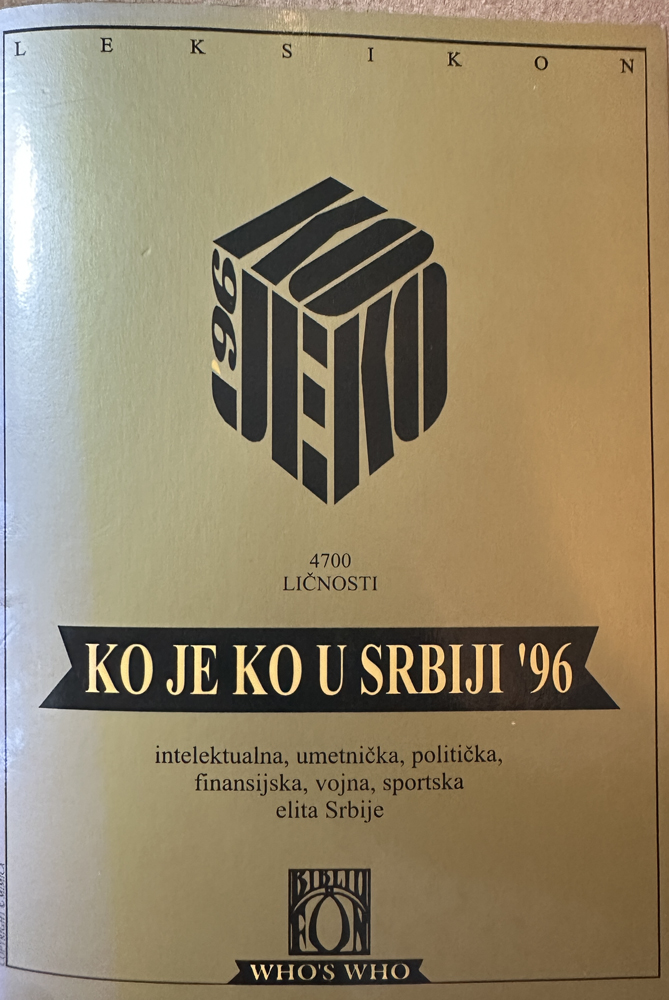
The Serbian Koje ko u Serbiji (1996)

Some Who's Who books have a title in the language of the country concerned:

- Croatian: Tko je tko u Hrvatskoj, bilingual edition (1993)
- Czech: Who is...? (v České republice), 2003, and 2010 Huebners blaues Who is Who.
- Danish: Kraks Blå Bog (since 1910) annually
- Finnish: Kuka kukin on (since 1909) at first irregularly, every fourth year since 1970
- German: Wer ist's? (1905–1935) and Wer ist wer? (since 1951) almost annually
- German: for East Germany: Wer war wer in der DDR?
- Japanese: Nihon Tarento Meikan (Talent Who's Who in Japan), a listing of Japanese celebrities, or tarentos, since 1970
- Lithuanian: Kas yra kas Lietuvoje (Who's Who in Lithuania), a listing of prominent Lithuanians and business companies since 1995.
- Norwegian: Hvem er Hvem? (since 1912) 14 editions in the 20th century
- Serbian: Koje ko u Serbiji, (1991), previously Koje ko u Jugoslaviji
- Slovak: Who is who v Slovenskej republike, 1991, Hubners Who is Who.
- Swedish: Vem är det (since 1912) every second year

=== Specialized publications ===
- International Who's Who by Europa Publications, a Taylor and Francis imprint
- Who's Who Among American High School Students listing American high school and college students who it claimed "excelled in academics, extracurricular activities and community service." The publishing company closed in 2007.
- Who's Who in American Art, a listing of prominent American artists
- Who's Who in British History
- Who's Who in the CIA, a book published in East Berlin in 1968 with the assistance of the KGB and the HVA purporting to reveal the identities of thousands of CIA officers.
- Who's Who in the DC Universe a listing of DC Comics characters
- Who's Who in the Theatre, published in Britain and the US from 1912 to 1982

== Scams ==
The title "Who's Who" is in the public domain, and thousands of Who's Who compilations of varying scope and quality (and similar publications without the words "Who's Who") have been published by various authors and publishers. Some publications have been described as scams; they list any people likely to buy the book or to pay for inclusion, with no criterion of genuine notability. They may offer vanity awards or expensive trophies.

One example is the defunct Who's Who Among American High School Students, which was criticized for questionable nomination practices, as well as whether the listing's entries are fact-checked and accurate. According to Steve Bjork, an admissions vice president of Hamline University: "It's honestly something that an admissions officer typically wouldn't consider or wouldn't play into an admissions decision." He suggested that Who's Who was "just trying to sell books".

Who's Who publications are not all of questionable value, but publishers that select truly notable people and provide trustworthy information on them are hard to identify. A & C Black's Who's Who is the canonical example of a legitimate Who's Who reference work, being the first to use the name and establish the approach in print, publishing annually since 1849. However, the longevity of a publication is not in itself a guarantee. In 1999, Tucker Carlson said in Forbes magazine that Marquis Who's Who, founded in 1898 but no longer an independent company, had adopted practices of address harvesting as a revenue stream, undermining its claim to legitimacy as a reference work listing people of merit. A 2005 New York Times article observed that the entries in Marquis Who's Who were "not uniformly fact-checked". The International Biographical Centre's "Who is Who" publications have also been cited as scams, being described as "Who’s Who of gullible people".

== See also ==
- Biographical dictionary
- Hinterland Who's Who, a series of 60-second public service ads profiling Canadian animals and birds, produced by Environment Canada in the 1960s
- Kdo byl kdo (Czech: "Who was who?")
