= American Biographical Institute =

Paid-inclusion vanity biographical reference directory publisher

- Industry: Who's Who scam
- Founded: 1967
- Defunct: 2012
- Fate: Bankrupt in 2012
- Headquarters: Raleigh, North Carolina, United States
- Products: Sale of, awards and biographical reference directories
- Owner: Arlene Calhoun
- Number of employees: 1 (2012)

The American Biographical Institute (ABI) was a paid-inclusion vanity award publisher based in Raleigh, North Carolina which published biographical reference directories, beginning in 1967. Each year the company awarded hundreds of "Man of the Year" or "Woman of the Year" awards at between $195 and $295 each. It generated revenue from sales of certificates and books to those listed.

Its awards were frequently denounced as scams by politicians, journalists, and others. The Government of Western Australia's ScamNet service considered the American Biographical Institute to be a scam vanity publisher "who appeals to people who want a plaque on their wall or see their name in a book, even if the honour has no real credibility—in effect, they have purchased the honour."

The company went bankrupt in 2012.

== Operations ==
The ABI invited individuals to purchase various honors as a commemorative in their inclusion for a specific biography. One former employee explained that the company bought mailing lists from organizations, then sent out blanket mailings inviting those individuals to be in biographical books or to accept awards. Such honors include "International Man of the Year," "Most Admired Man of the Decade" or "Outstanding Man of the 21st Century", or to be included in ABI publications, such as 500 Leaders of Science or The World Book of Knowledge, in exchange for a contribution fee. Those who accepted, who provided their own biographies, were offered books or certificates at prices as high as US $795.

On its website, the publisher described itself as "one of the world's leading biographical reference publishers and authorities on global contemporary achievement" and claimed that "inclusion in an ABI reference title is based on personal achievement alone and is not available for purchase." The ABI shared an address and P.O. box with the United Cultural Convention, another purveyor of for-profit awards.

In 2007, referring to the International Biographical Centre, the American Biographical Institute, and Marquis Who's Who, Jan Margosian, consumer information coordinator for the Oregon Department of Justice, warned consumers to be wary and called the companies "pretty tacky", adding "I don't know why they would put you in there if they weren't hoping to get you to buy the book. You truly have to look at how they are marketing and what the spin is. It's something you might want to watch out for."

=== World Forum ===
The ABI was the co-host, with the International Biographical Centre (IBC), of a yearly World Forum (previously the International Congress on Arts and Communications), which invited a group for a week of professional seminars, artistic displays, and performances, and culture sharing. Host cities over 31 yearly meetings have included New York; Washington, D.C.; New Orleans; San Francisco; Edinburgh; Cambridge, UK; Nairobi; Madrid; Lisbon; Cambridge, Mass., USA; Oxford, UK; Singapore; and Sydney. The Maitre Artiste of Ethiopia, Afewerk Tekle, was a regular attendee. No proceedings of these forums were produced except the ABI which included these in a newsletter.

== Awards and titles ==
The American Biographical Institute gave awards such as Man of the Year or Scientific Award of Excellence to many people in a year. Every award could be purchased from them.

New awards were continually created and marketed. Most awards were available for between US$195 and $495, payable by the recipient, depending on their level of prestige and the quality of the printing on the certificate and the material in the frame or mount. In 2005 the institute awarded 200 "Man of the Year" awards at between $195 and $295 each.

The ABI did not provide a consolidated list of all the awards, medals, diplomas, and certificates it issued.

== See also ==
- Author mill
- Who's Who scam
