= Social Hall (Salt Lake City) =

Former theater in Salt Lake City, Utah, US

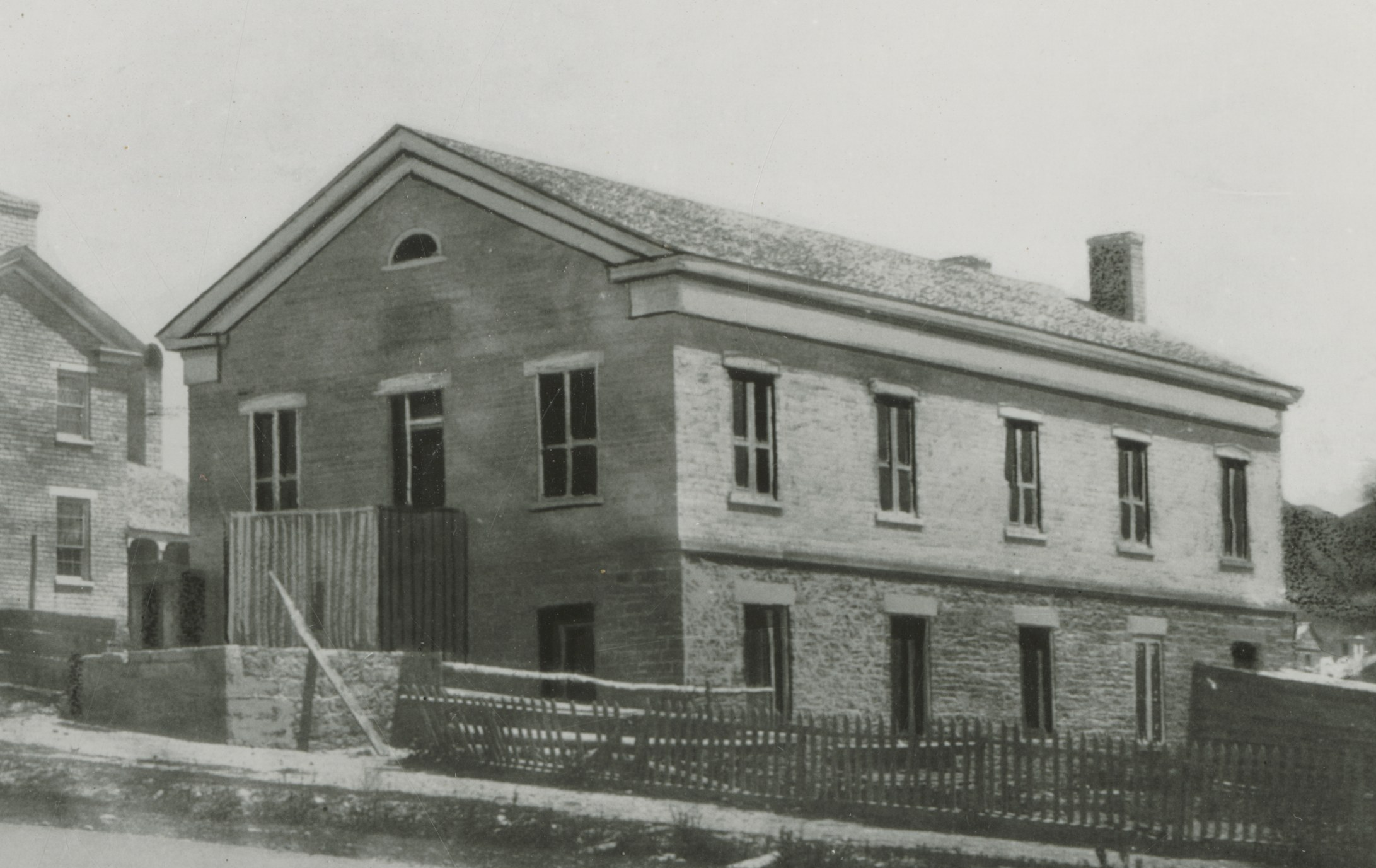
- The Social Hall, circa 1858

General information
- Status: Demolished
- Architectural style: Pioneer style
- Location: 41 South State Street, Salt Lake City, Utah, United States
- Coordinates: 40°46′5.65″N 111°53′16.60″W
- Year built: 1852–1853
- Inaugurated: January 1, 1853
- Demolished: 1922
- Owner: The Church of Jesus Christ of Latter-day Saints

Technical details
- Material: Stone/Adobe
- Floor count: 2

Design and construction
- Architect: Truman O. Angell

The Social Hall was a historic theater and multi-use building in Salt Lake City, Utah. Opened on New Year's Day 1853, the structure has often been called the first theater built "west of the Missouri River." Besides its use as a playhouse, it served as a meeting and lecture hall, hosted sessions of the Utah Territorial Legislative Assembly, was the first home of the Salt Lake Stake Academy (now Ensign College), and later hosted the first the gym in the region. Fairs, political gatherings, reunions and art exhibitions were also common events held in the structure.

Eventually, the Salt Lake Theatre replaced the Social Hall as the preeminent theater in the region and the structure was razed in 1922. In 1979, a small archaeological excavation occurred at the building's former site to aid in the construction of a replica at This Is the Place Heritage Park. In 1991, the building's original foundations were uncovered during a construction project, leading to the creation of the Social Hall Heritage Museum. The museum contained artifacts related to the hall, including the foundations, until it was demolished in 2019.

== Description ==
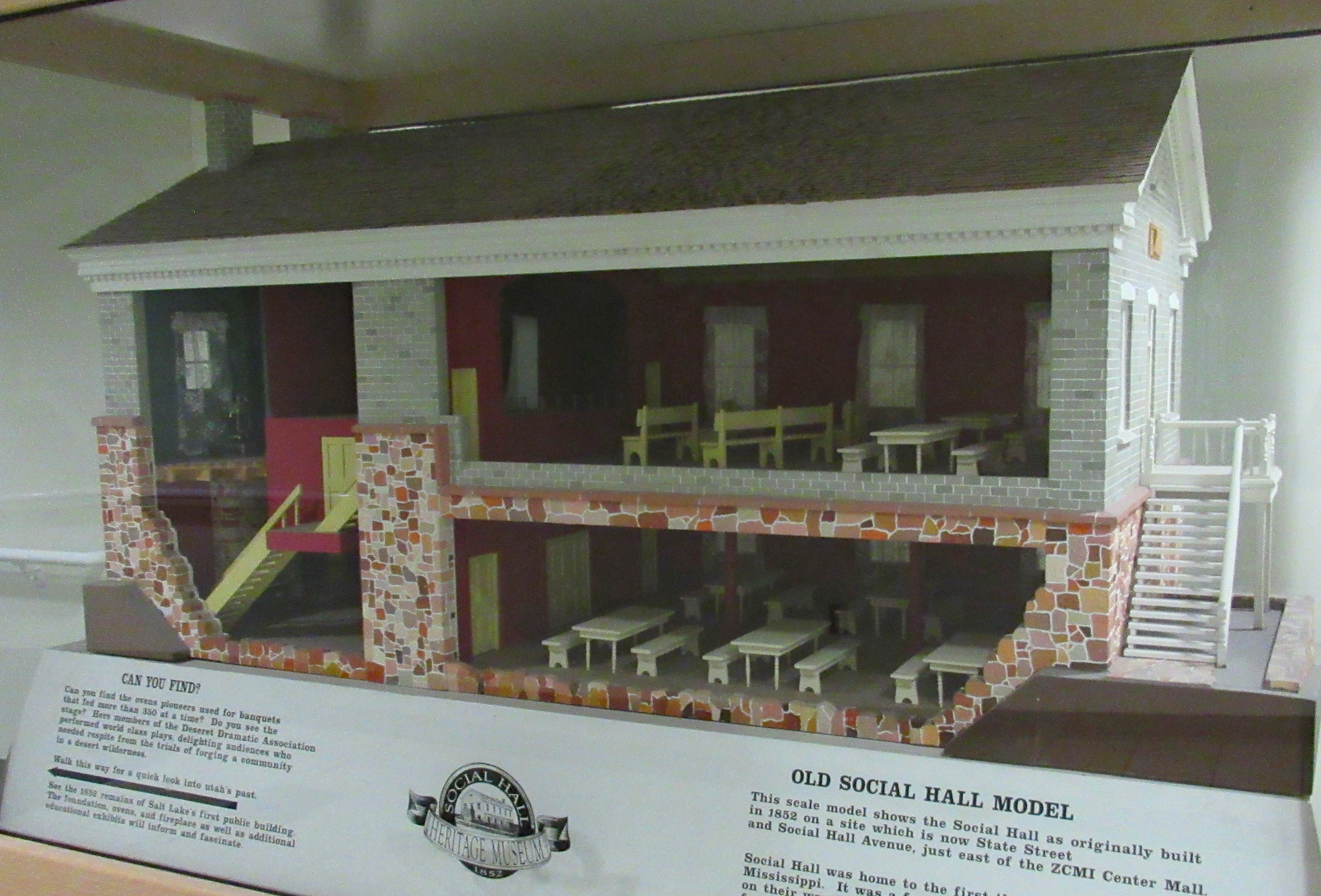
A cutaway model of the Social Hall

The Social Hall was built along the east side of State Street (then known as First East street) in the downtown area of Salt Lake City. Its architect was Truman O. Angell and William Ward oversaw the stone cutting. It was a two-story, five-bay rectilinear structure, measuring 33 feet (10 m) by 73 feet (22 m). (Note: Newspapers reported that the archeological excavation in 1991 discovered the building's dimensions were different than commonly thought, with The Salt Lake Tribune reporting archeologists found the building was 36 feet (11 m) by 71 feet (22 m).) The main floor, which was built of adobe brick, included the auditorium (designed to fit 300–350 persons) with a stage on the east end and dressing rooms behind. Built into the proscenium arch above the stage was a bust of William Shakespeare. The lower level, built of red sandstone, included a banquet hall and kitchen area. In later years, the exterior was stuccoed, quoins added, and a new entrance staircase built, which gave the structure a Georgian-style appearance.

== History ==
=== Deseret Dramatic Association ===
At the request of church president Brigham Young, the Deseret Musical & Dramatic Association was organized on October 6, 1849, in Great Salt Lake City, to provide entertainment in the new settlement. It included long-time Saints who had performed in Nauvoo, Illinois, previous home of the church, along with newly immigrated church members. The organization's first performances were held in the Old Bowery on Temple Square. In December 1851, the final bowery on the square was removed and the association was disband. A new organization, called the Deseret Dramatic Association, was organized on February 20, 1852, at the home of William Clayton. The purpose in the dissolution and reorganization of these associations was to separate out the entertainment responsibilities and the responsibilities of an organization devoted solely to the dramatic arts. The association's request to use the then newly built tabernacle was denied, as Young felt its use should be strictly ecclesiastical, and instead he announced, in March 1852, construction of the Social Hall to serve as the community's theater.

=== Opening ===
The Social Hall was constructed in 1852, with some finishing touches continuing into spring 1853. It was dedicated by church apostle Amasa Lyman on January 1, 1853. The ceremony, attended by nearly 400 persons, also included an address given by James Ferguson, musical performances, and dancing; lasting for most of the day, the festivities were closed with a benediction by Jedediah M. Grant. The first theatricals were held on January 17, with performances of Don César de Bazan and The Irish Lion.

=== Varied uses ===
There was little to no theater activity in the Social Hall for much of the late 1850s, owing to the Utah War. Although the community utilized the structure in other ways, for example on November 3, 1857, a special priesthood meeting was held in the building, in which Brigham Young introduced the catechism questions used by the church during the Mormon Reformation. According to a non-Mormon, John I. Ginn, who was briefly in Salt Lake City during the Utah War period, the men who would later become the victims of the Aiken massacre spent their first night under arrest in the Social Hall.

Before, during and after the Utah War period the building was used in a variety of ways in addition to dramatics. The Utah Territorial Legislative Assembly held their meetings in the building for several of their annual sessions. The first reunion of Zion's Camp was hosted by Brigham Young in the hall during October 1864. The Mormon Tabernacle Choir held rehearsals and gatherings in the building.

=== Schools / gymnasium / art studio ===
After the dramatic activities were moved to the newly opened Salt Lake Theatre, Mary E. Cook opened a primary school in the building, which was later supervised by Ida Ione Cook.

At the time of Brigham Young's death in 1877, the Social Hall and other several properties, which had been constructed and maintained (at least in part) by the church, were in his name. The church claimed a $1,000,000 debt against the estate, and as part of a settlement, the Social Hall was received by the Church (at a value of $17,439 [equivalent to $527,257 in 2025]). During the U.S. government's crusade against Mormon polygamy, ownership of the building was temporarily transferred by the church to the "Social Hall Society" to prevent its confiscation by the federal government under the Edmunds–Tucker Act.

On November 15, 1886, the Salt Lake Stake Academy (currently Ensign College) was first opened in the Social Hall under the supervision of Karl G. Maeser. Classes were held in the basement of the structure, which had recently been painted, carpeted and furnished with desks and other necessary school equipment. The school used the building for nearly five years before leaving for larger, more suitable quarters. The school held a farewell celebration in the Social Hall during October 1891, which included a speech by Dr. James E. Talmage. Even after the school moved out, it would occasionally use the hall for extra classroom space up until the building was demolished.

On November 1, 1893, Maud Babcock opened the Utah School of Physical Culture and Elocution in the building. The school's gym would be the first in the Utah region. A few years later, the two Mutual Improvement Associations of the Salt Lake Stake decided to form the Mutual Improvement League, which added a library, locker and bath facilities (which included marble baths) to the basement level, while the upper level retained its gym. Physical education classes for the league continued to be taught by Babcock. The building reopened with these improvements in February 1896, and a membership in the league was required to use all the facilities, minus the library. The league continued to utilize the Social Hall until the nearby Deseret Gym was opened in September 1910.

In 1905, the Church planned to turn over the historic building to the Society of Utah Artists, which wanted to make it their headquarters and remodel the exterior in Ancient Greek architecture style. However, two years later, the organization was still seeking funds to remodel the hall. Mahonri Young was provided space in the hall to create his Statues of Joseph and Hyrum Smith.

=== Theater restoration ===
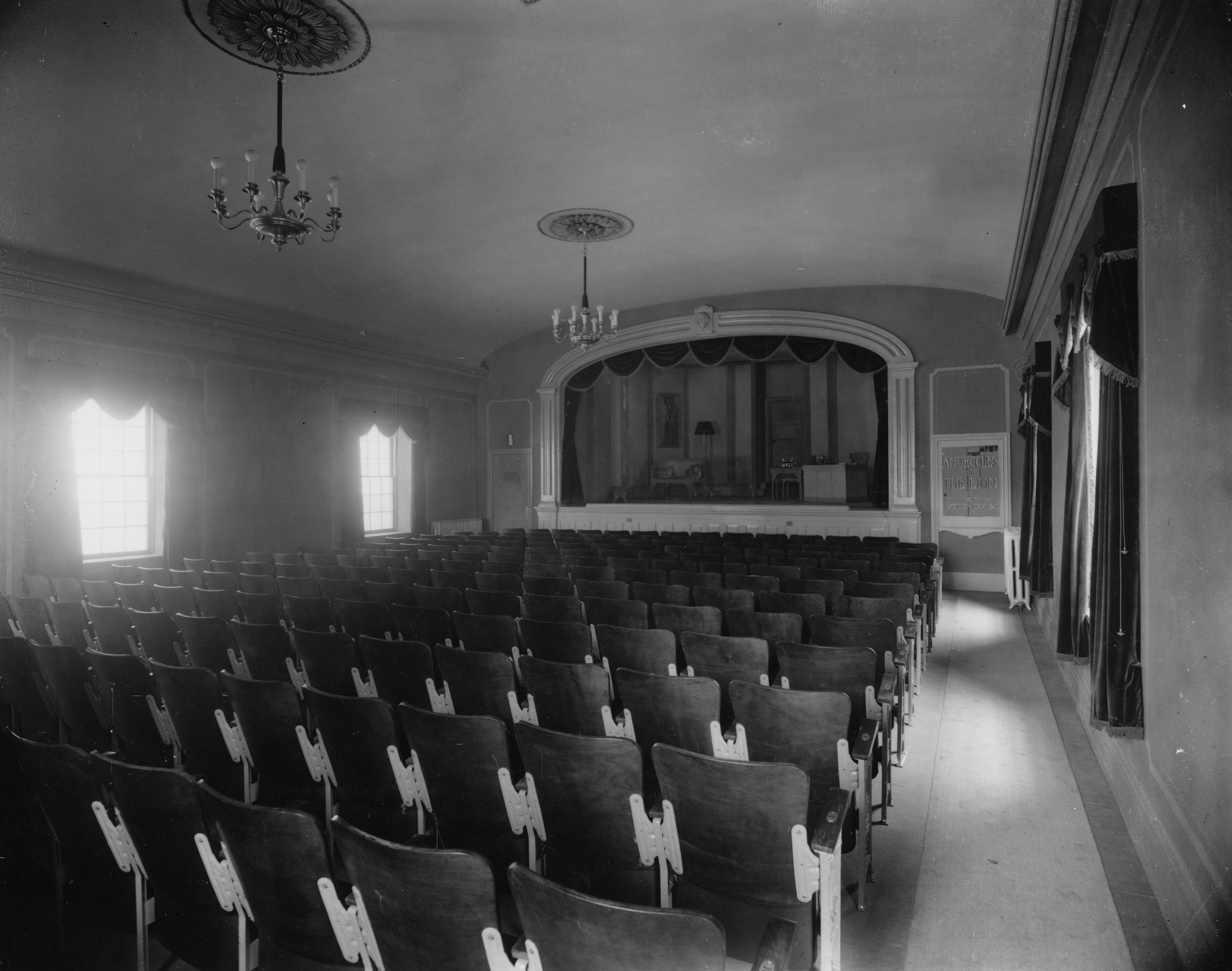
The building's interior in December 1918, when it was being used by the Varsity Players

In 1908, the auxiliary committee of the Genealogical Society of Utah announced it would restore the Social Hall for use as a theater and for social functions. During the project, original features were kept when practical and the total cost of the restoration was about $4,000 (equivalent to $143,333 in 2025). Following the completion of the project, a private rededication for the hall was held February 9, 1909. Hosted by the church's First Presidency, the ceremonies included a dinner, impromptu program, and dancing. A dedicatory prayer was given by Presiding Bishop Charles W. Nibley. A formal, public reopening of the structure was then held of February 19, with a banquet and ball.

In 1914, a cafeteria, initially just for working female Latter-day Saints, was opened in the building. Around this time, a number of art exhibitions had already been held in, and would continue to utilize, the building. During World War I, the hall was also used by various women's organizations under the direction of the American Red Cross, who sewed clothing for American service members.

In 1918, Maud Babcock again began to use the Social Hall, this time to host productions in line with the Little Theatre Movement, and with casts that would combined students from the University of Utah and professional actors. The church spent $5,000 (equivalent to $107,024 in 2025) to improve the building to support the new theater program. The theater company was known as the "Varsity Players," and they held their first performance in the structure on September 30, 1918, with a production of J. M. Barrie's The Professor's Love Story. The production included performances by Maurice Browne and Ellen Van Volkenburg. Other actors who made up the Varsity Players included Byron Foulger and Moroni Olsen. The Varsity Players at the Social Hall were the first university-subsidized professional theater in the United States.

A small fire occurred the Social Hall in February 1921, doing about $300 (equivalent to $5,415 in 2025) in damage. It was extinguished after four members of the Varsity Players discovered the blaze and notified the fire department. A few months later, a production of Little Women was given by the University of Utah's Dramatic club. In October of that year, The Utah Chronicle announced that no productions of the Varsity Players would be held in the Social Hall for the upcoming year.

=== Demolition ===
In November 1921, the church-owned Deseret News published an article saying the Presiding Bishop's office had announced that the Social Hall had been condemned by the city's fire chief, and given the costs to fireproof the building, the First Presidency had reached a decision to tear it down. The day prior the announcement, the removal of hangings and opera chairs from the theater had already been completed.

The decision quickly garnered opposition from the community. In a meeting with concerned members of the Daughters of Utah Pioneers, the fire chief indicated he had not condemned the building and it did not need to be torn down. He did share that its use as a theater (in its current state) would not be allowed, given city laws, but that the structure could be used for other purposes.

Salt Lake City's Mayor, Charles Clarence Neslen, submitted an offer for the city to take ownership the historic building from the church so that it could be preserved. At the same time, the church was receiving requests from tenants along Social Hall Avenue asking that the building be demolished, as it stood as an obstruction at the head of a street that "would otherwise be one of the finest automobile streets in the country." The matter was discussed by church leadership during a weekly temple meeting in December, and although newspapers reported no final decision had been reached, there was consensus that the building should, at the very least, be moved from its original location. Church president Heber J. Grant indicated that the old theater affected the value of millions of dollars' worth of property of nearby landowners and tenants, who found the structure to be a detriment to their interests and Grant stated that their desires needed consideration.

On April 23, 1922, The Salt Lake Tribune reported that the Ross Wrecking Company had begun demolishing the Social Hall the day prior and that the work would be completed in a few days.

== Remembrances ==
=== 1933 Monument ===
On June 11, 1933, the two Mutual Improvement Associations and Utah Pioneer Trails and Landmarks Association (UPTLA) dedicated a marker at the site of the former theater. It consisted of a large granite shaft with two bronze tablets; one tablet was a bas-relief image of the historic structure and the other was the standard UPTLA marker with an inscription concerning the building's history.

=== Replica at This Is the Place ===
In 1976, the Utah Parks and Recreation Board voted to accept a $100,000 (equivalent to $565,789 in 2025) gift from James D. Moyle to build a replica of the Social Hall at Old Deseret Village in Pioneer Trail State Park (currently This Is the Place Heritage Park). While the replica was being designed, the archives of the Utah State Historical Society and Church Historian and Recorder were searched for plans, photographs, and descriptions of the building. The public was also asked to bring forward any photographs they had of the former structure.

To aid in the reconstruction, an exploratory trench was dug at the former building's site by archeologists from the state's antiquities staff. The dig, held in January 1979, was done to get a better understanding of the size and location of basement windows, along with information on the basement floor, and details such as paint colors from pieces that fell into the rubble when the structure was demolished. The excavation found that the foundation was made of sandstone which had been plastered.

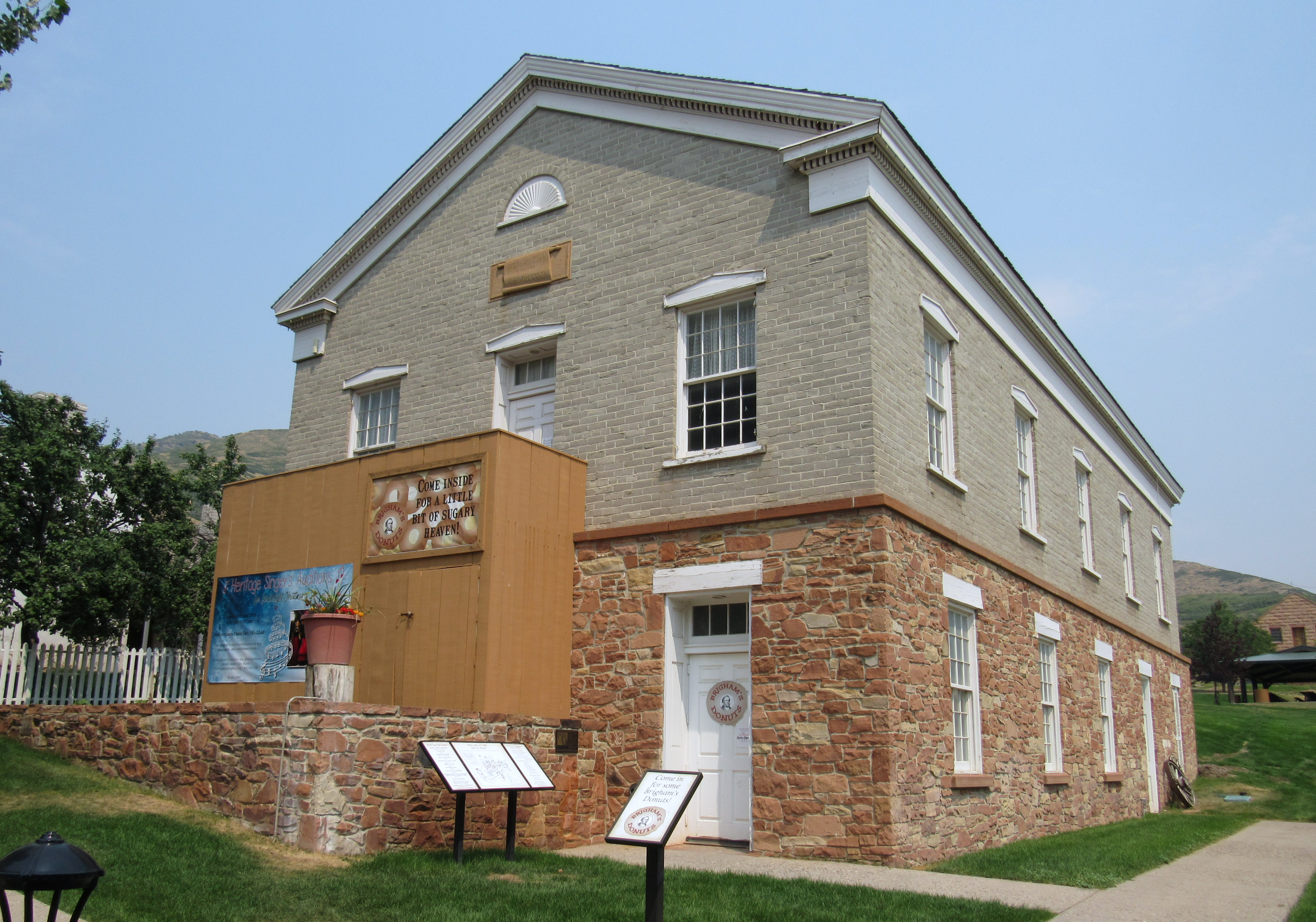
1980 replica at This Is the Place Heritage Park

Ground was broken for the replica's construction at the park in September 1979. Park officials had planned to replica the building using adobe brick like the original, but difficulties in producing the pioneer-building material surfaced and concrete slump blocks were used instead. On July 24, 1980, the completed building was dedicated by church president Spencer W. Kimball, with Utah Governor Scott M. Matheson cutting the ribbon. When larger-scale excavations of the Social Hall site occurred during construction of a tunnel in 1991, it was discovered that the hall was a different size than previously understood, and the park's replica had been built with different dimensions than the original.

Prior to the construction of this replica, plans had been announced to build other reproductions, although they never came fruition. These included a replica at the Missionary Home in Salt Lake City, which would serve as an assembly hall and classrooms for missionaries in training, and a replica at Pioneer Park.

=== Social Hall Heritage Museum (1992–2019) ===
Social Hall Heritage Museum

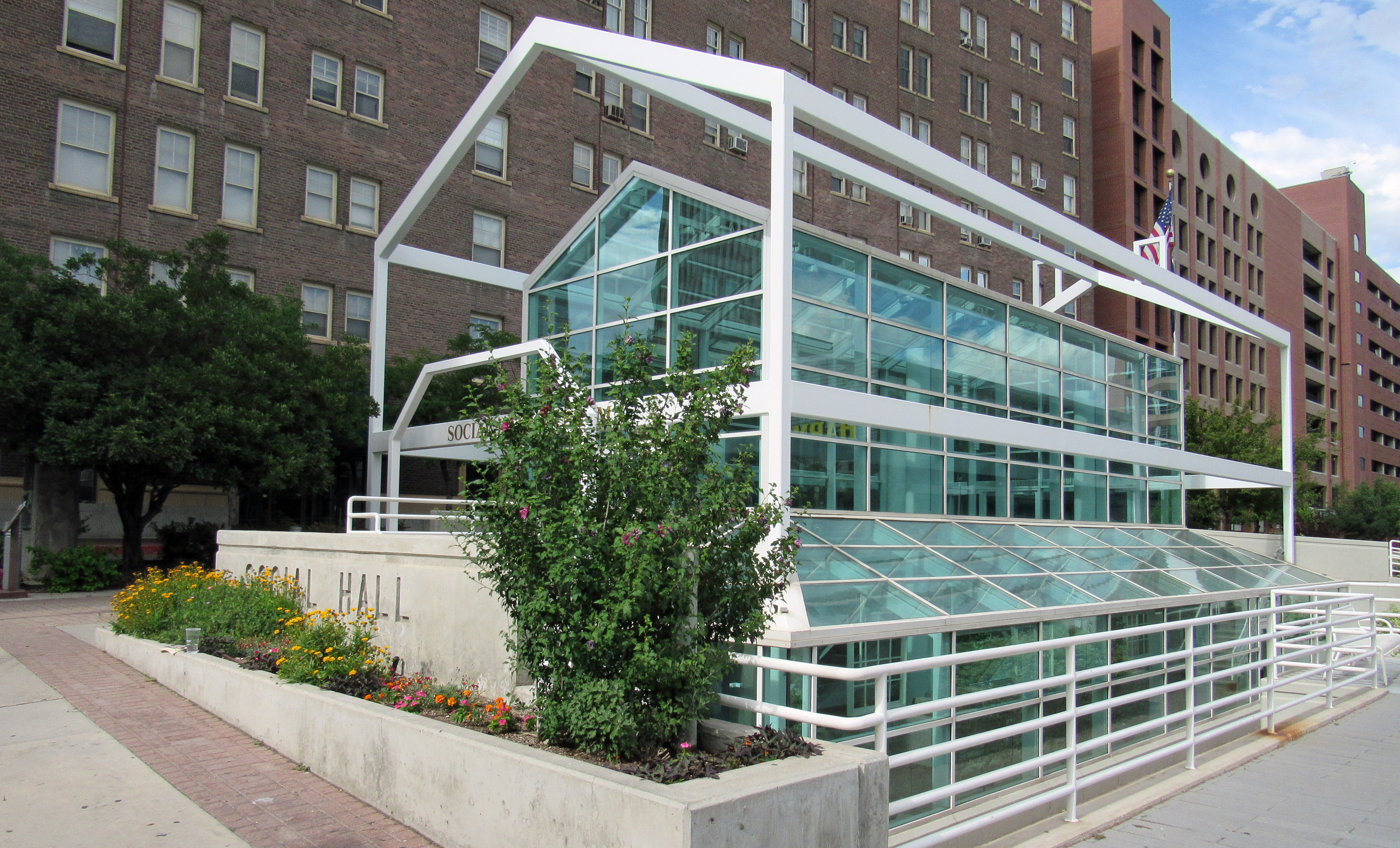
Museum exterior. The outer framework had the same dimensions as the Social Hall, which created a "ghost structure."

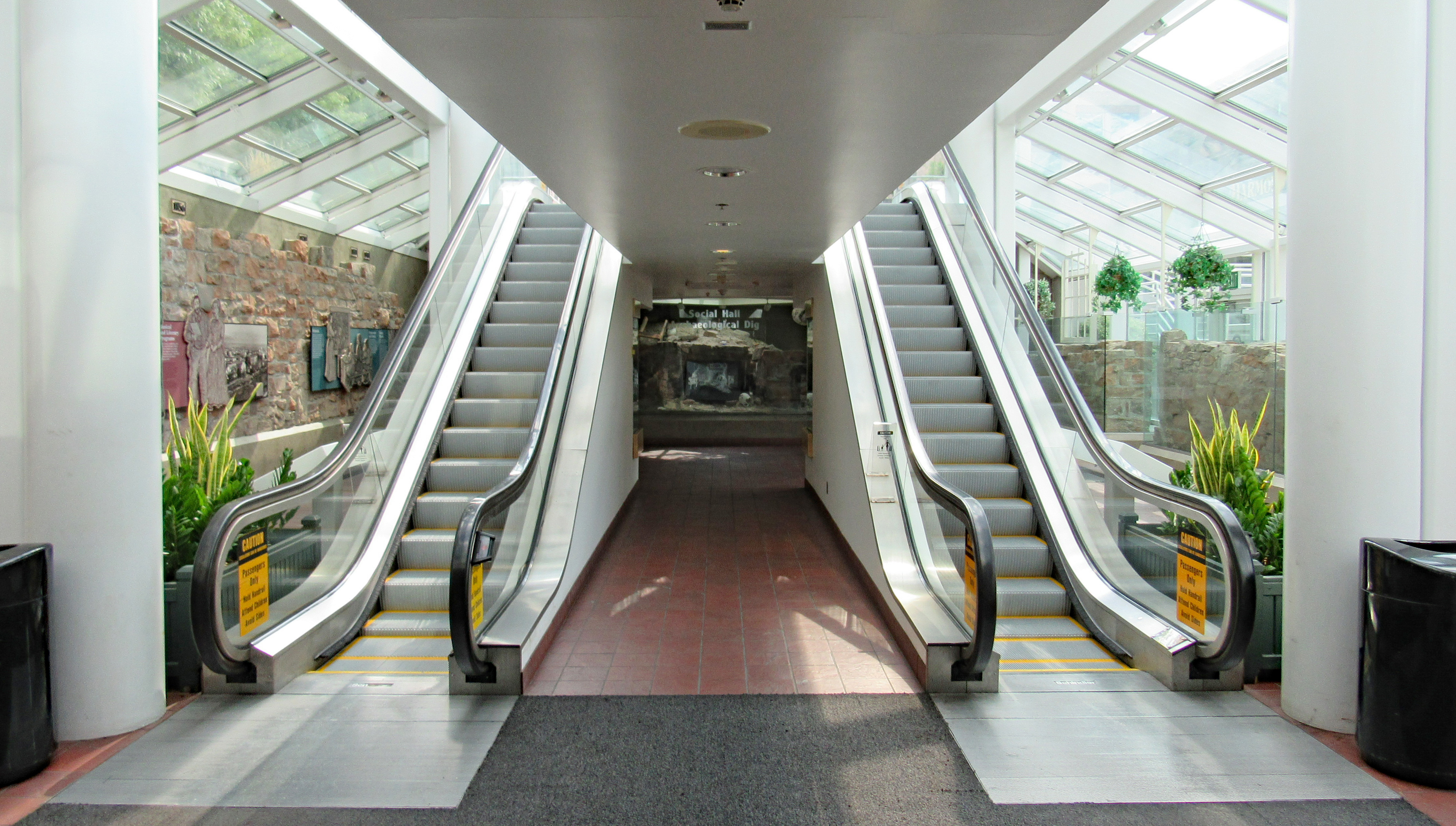
Lower level of the museum. Encased in glass at the right is part of the original foundation and the stone ovens are straight ahead, with interpretive signs on the wall at left. The escalators went up to the street level.

In 1991, Zions Securities Corporation, a for-profit real estate entity owned by the LDS Church, announced plans to construct a tunnel beneath State Street, to connect ZCMI Center Mall with parking garages along Social Hall Avenue. A new glass building, with escalators, would serve as the east entrance to the tunnel and sit on the former site of the Social Hall. Construction on the tunnel began in April of that year and on May 9 construction crews unearthed the Social Hall's foundation. Church officials agreed to slow construction and allow archeologists time to study the ruins. BYU's Office of Public Archaeology was brought in to complete the archeological work. Officials with Zions Securities were not surprised to find some remains of the building, but did not foresee finding a mostly intact foundation in good condition.

Initially, officials considered moving the ruins to Pioneer Trail State Park, but instead settled on plans to turn the entrance and escalator building at the east end of the tunnel into a museum to preserve parts of the foundation, the ovens, and display some of the artifacts discovered during the archeological work. The theater's foundation was cut into sections and temporarily removed while a new foundation to support the museum was constructed, after which portions of the foundation were returned to their original spots. A glass and steel structure was then erected. Surrounding the new glass building was a metal framework with the same dimensions as the Social Hall, which created a "ghost structure" to help visitors envision the size of the original theater.

On June 9, 1992, the Social Hall Heritage Museum was opened and dedicated by church president Gordon B. Hinckley, who shared during the ceremony that he recalled attending a puppet show in the theater as a child. The museum's lower level included a gallery with portions of the original foundation and stone ovens, artifacts and displays, along with interpretive signage. Also included was a scale model (with cutaway view) of the theater, which had been created by Zions Securities' vice president, Jim Walton.

The Social Hall Heritage Museum was closed June 1, 2019, in preparation for construction of a nearby office tower and reconfiguration of the tunnel.

=== Plaza Pavilion / The Link at City Creek ===
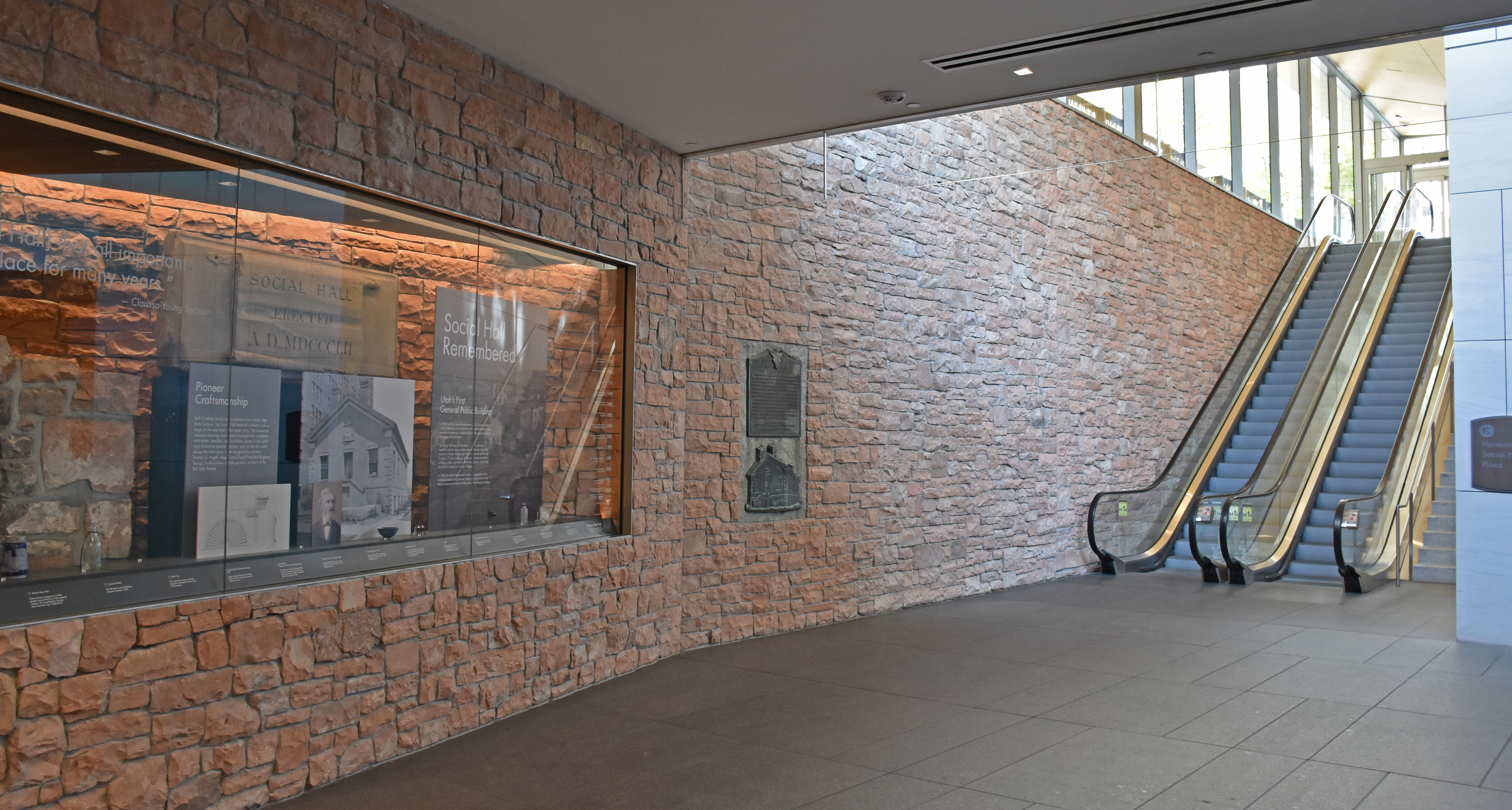
The Social Hall exhibit on the lower level the Social Hall Plaza Pavilion/The Link

During construction of the 95 State at City Creek high-rise office tower, the museum was demolished. It was replaced by the Social Hall Plaza Pavilion which serves as the eastern entrance to the tunnel, now known as "The Link." A small memorial exhibit was constructed on the lower level of the new entrance, which features a display with artifacts related to the Social Hall. Surrounding the display, pieces of the Social Hall's cut-up sandstone foundation were built into the walls.

== Social Hall Avenue ==
Running along the north side of the Social Hall and then east through the block to 200 East street, was a small alley. At least as early as the 1890s, nearby landowners were requesting the city widen the alley and make it a proper public road, which would have required the demolition of the Social Hall. These early attempts failed, largely due to cost.

In March 1917, it was announced that the alley would be expanded to a full-size street and new buildings would be constructed for automobile dealers, garages and repair shops. This transformation of the alley into an 'Auto Row' was the idea of Dr. James T. Keith, who helped the church acquire all the necessary property for the redevelopment project. The demolition of the Social Hall was included in the announcement of the project. Following the announcement, public sentiment came out in support of saving the historic building and plans were revised to preserve the structure. This included routing one lane of the new road on both sides of the hall. The church also constructed the neighboring Belvedere Apartments during the development of the area. In 1923, the year after the Social Hall was demolished, the city was asked to rename the street to Motor Avenue. In 1954, after the automobile industry had virtually left the street, its name was returned to Social Hall Avenue. In the mid-20th Century, the street was nicked named 'Television Row' owing to all of the city's major television stations having their studios on the avenue.

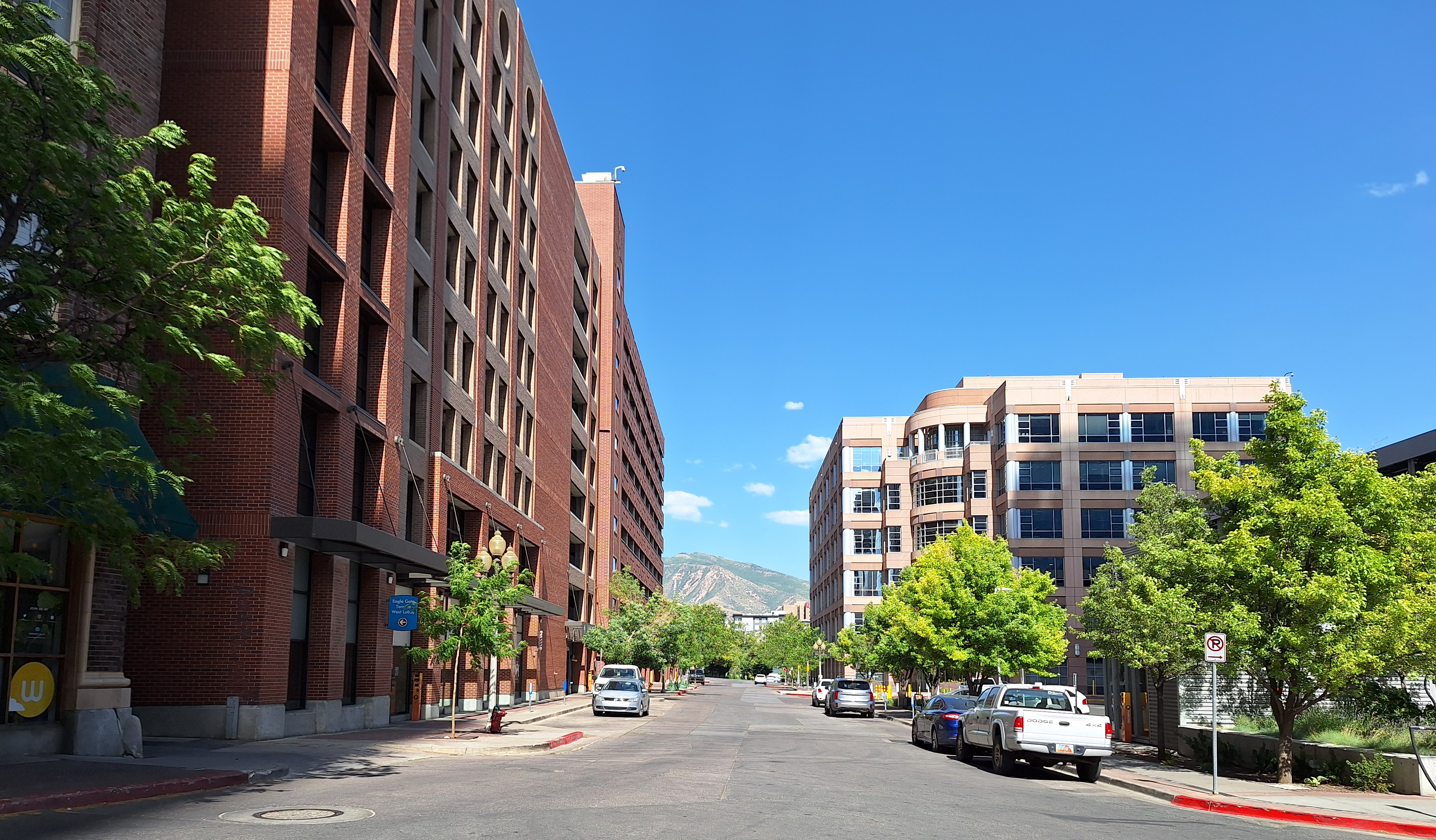
Social Hall Avenue, looking east

The north side of Social Hall Avenue is currently home to parking structures, while on the south side is Social Hall Plaza (a mid-rise office Building opened in 1996), a Harmons Grocery (opened 2012), and the 95 State at City Creek high-rise office building (opened 2022). 95 State also includes an LDS meetinghouse built into its lower levels, creating the first gathering place for Latter-day Saints on the avenue since the destruction of the Social Hall. On the west end of the street, at the original site of the Social Hall, is the Social Hall Plaza Pavilion with its entrance into "The Link" tunnel.

== See also ==
- Council House (Salt Lake City)

== Bibliography ==
- Hilton, Lynn M. (1995). The History of LDS Business College and its Parent Institutions 1886–1993. Salt Lake City: LDS Business College.
- Jenson, Andrew (1941). "Social Hall". Encyclopedic History of the Church of Jesus Christ of Latter-day Saints. Salt Lake City: Deseret News Publishing Company.
- Maughan, Ila Fisher (1961). Pioneer Theatre in the Desert. Salt Lake City: Deseret Book Company.
