= Kdo byl kdo =

Cover of the first volume

Kdo byl kdo (in English, "Who was who") is the name of two major encyclopedic works in Czech, published as books, CD-ROMs and also available online. Their publisher is Libri.

- Kdo byl kdo v našich dějinách ve 20. století (Who was who in our history in 20th century): ISBN 80-85983-44-3 volume 1, 467 pages, ISBN 80-85983-64-8 volume 2, 482 pages
- Milan Churaň et al.: Kdo byl kdo v našich dějinách do roku 1918 (Who was who in our history until 1918): ISBN 80-85983-94-X, 572 pages.

Among other books in the "Kdo byl kdo" edition are

- Kdo byl kdo - proslulí návštěvníci (Who was who - Famous visitors): ISBN 80-85983-87-7, 516 pages.
- Kdo byl kdo - slavní vojevůdci (Who was who - Famous commanders): ISBN 80-85983-19-2, 333 pages.
- Kdo byl kdo v našich dějinách - komplet: complete edition in three volumes, ISBN 80-85983-65-6.
- A database providing the biographical data sorted by date (Kalendárium).

The encyclopedia covering the period until 1918 contains biographies of about 800 people notable in the history of Czech and Slovak lands. Short information is provided about another 1,000 people. The encyclopedia for the 20th century contains biographies of over 1,200 people and short information about 2,000 others.

The main target market of the works is schools.

== See also ==
- Who's Who
