= Devi Dutt Sharma =

Indian writer and scholar

- Born: 23 October 1924 (age 101); Kumaon, Uttarakhand, India
- Occupations: Scholar, writer
- Awards: Padma Shri; Life Time Achievement Award; All India Vidvat Samman; Sanskrit Vidvat Samman; IBC International Man of the Millennium Award; Millennium Sanskrit Samman; President of India Certificate of Honour
- Website: Official web site

Devi Dutt Sharma (born 23 October 1924) is an Indian scholar and writer of Dogri literature, best known for his writings on Himalayan dialects, culture and ethnic history. The Government of India honored Sharma in 2011, with the fourth highest civilian award of Padma Shri.

== Biography ==
Devi Dutt Sharma was born on 23 October 1924 in the Nanital Kumaon district of the Indian state of Uttarakhand. After passing his master's degree (MA) from Agra University, he secured two doctoral degrees, a PhD from Banares Hindu University and a DLitt from Panjab University, Chandigarh. He is credited with 28 books, 200 research papers and contributions to 56 research volumes. and is best known for his eight volume work, Socio-Cultural History of Uttarakhand. He has completed a three volume encyclopedia, Gyan Kosh which is awaiting publication.

A former Sanskrit professor of Panjab University, Chandigarh, Sharma has been honored with several awards such as the Life Time Achievement Award by the Garhwal University, Srinagar. All India Vidvat Samman by the Gyan Kalyan Datvya Nyas, New Delhi, Sanskrit Vidvat Samman (1999) by the Sampurnanand Sanskrit University, International Man of the Millennium Award (2000) from the International Biographical Centre, Cambridge, UK, Millennium Sanskrit Samman (2001) by the Government of India, and the Certificate of Honour (2001) from the President of India. In 2011, the Government of India included Sharma in the Republic day honours for the award of Padma Shri.
