= Pioneer style =

Utahn style of architecture

The Pioneer Style was a popular style of Utahn architecture most utilized during the years 1847 to 1890. The pioneers of the Church of Jesus Christ of Latter-Day Saints (LDS Church), commonly referred to as Mormons, trekked west into the Utah Territory to seek refuge from religious persecution in the mid-Western and Eastern United States. Because the Latter-day Saints were some of the earliest and significant settlers in the Utah area, the foundational architecture in Utah is largely influenced by these early settlers. Architecture in Utah is highly religious, consisting of temples and church meetinghouses, and European-influenced due to the origins of many of the settlers. Members of the Church valued the institution of education, an idea they carried with them from the Northern States, which resulted in many schools being established for their children. Entertainment was another highly appreciated and valued aspect among the early members of the Church which resulted in the establishment of many theatres and music halls.

These are some examples of the influences behind many buildings and their purposes in the Utah's early years. However, the actual architectural designs of the buildings were influenced by other, often non-religious factors. With the railroad being completed in Utah in 1869, many non-Latter-day Saints came to and settled in Utah. Many of these newcomers were European immigrants resulting in the Pioneer styles being based on early Greek, Roman, and English architecture.”

== Historical Context ==
=== The Church of Jesus Christ of Latter-day Saints ===
The Church of Jesus Christ of Latter-day Saints was founded on April 6, 1830, by the Prophet Joseph Smith under the direction of God. The members grew rapidly as did the persecution of the newly restored Church. The members were persecuted in and driven out of New York, Ohio, Missouri, and eventually Illinois. After the Prophet Joseph Smith was murdered at the Carthage Jail in Illinois, the members were forced to migrate to the west. The Mormon pioneers consisted of 80,000 Latter-day Saints migrating west to the Salt Lake Valley from the mid-1840s to the 1860s. The Salt Lake Valley was Mexican territory upon their arrival, but it was quickly ceded to American in the Mexican-American War in 1848.

=== Settling in Utah ===
A priority of the Church of Jesus Christ at this time was for all of the members to live together in one community in order to strengthen the Church. Many of Church converts in other parts of the world, such as England and Scandinavia, were encouraged to immigrate to the U. S. and dwell among the members in Utah, which many did. Once the Pioneers settled in Utah, they at once began constructing the Salt Lake Temple and the Tabernacle at Temple Square. For the individual homes, the architectural style was fashioned after the Pioneer Style which was prominent during Colonial America. The styles include a symmetrical, rectangular shape with few curves and ornamentation. The modest aspects of the Pioneer Style were even more modest in Utah’s humble living conditions.

=== Influence of Non-Mormons ===
The majority of the population in Utah were Latter-day Saints, but over time, more and more people came to Utah who were not members of the Church of Jesus Christ. The members referred to these people as Gentiles. Because unity and community were dominating concepts and practices during the early days of the Church, association with the Gentiles was not encouraged. Nevertheless, the Gentiles became successful in the coal mining industries and investing in the ZCMI. So much so that they became incredibly wealthy and built extravagant homes. The members of the Church were discouraged from participating in the mining industry or spending their money on materialistic endeavors, so many of the mansions built in Utah are a result of the non-members. There was also an influx in immigration (mostly from Scandinavia, the United Kingdom, and Japan) to Utah as a result of the newly finished railroads in the 1860s. Often time these immigrants joined the Latter-day Saint Church, but this was not the norm. Many immigrants were devoutly Catholic or Lutheran bringing with them architectural styles associated with Catholic or Lutheran churches.

== Temples ==
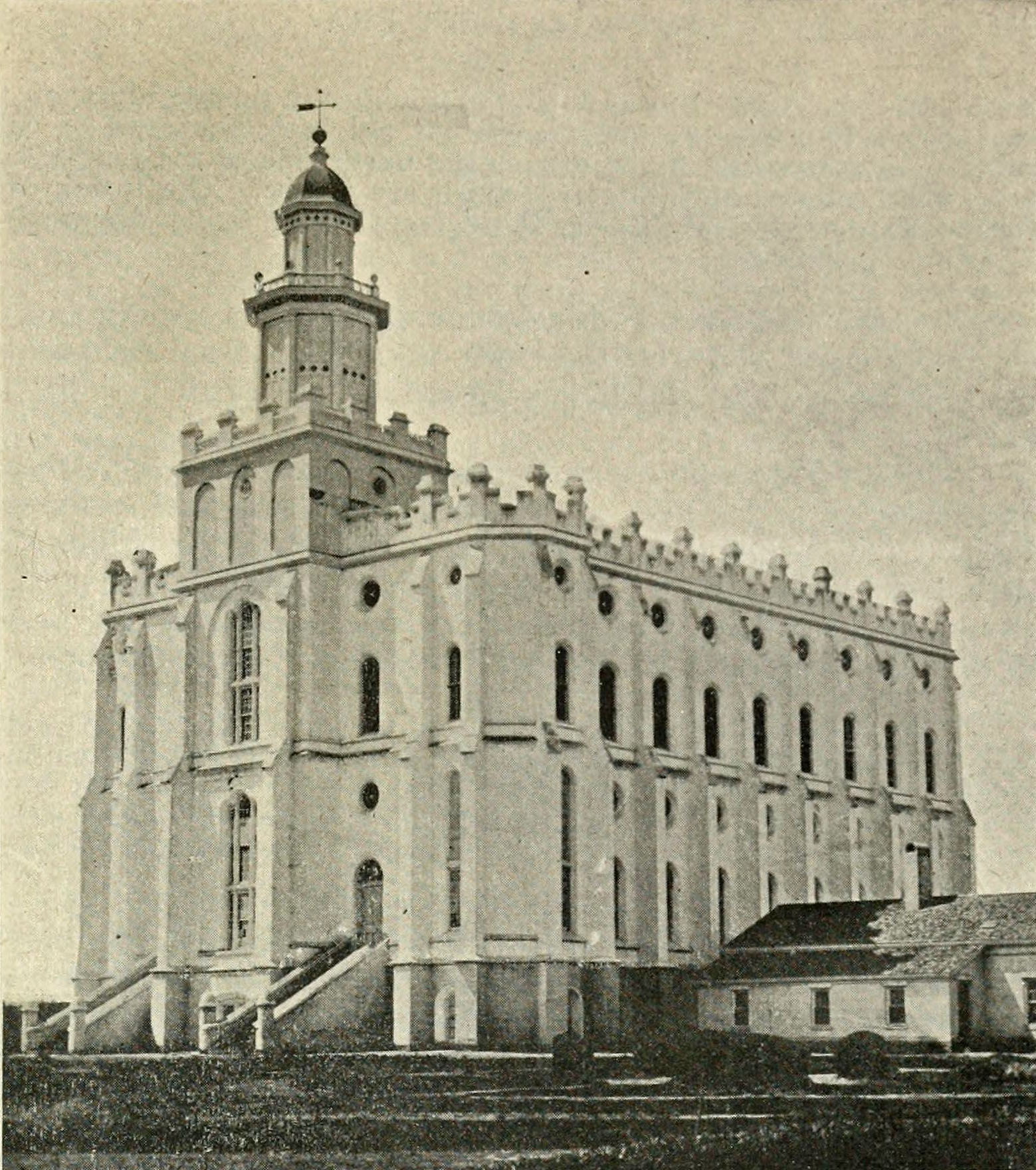
St. George Temple in Utah, 1914.

Temples are a significant aspect of The Church of Jesus Christ of Latter-day Saints even today. Church members value temples mainly because of the sacred space it provides for necessary temple ordinances to be performed. While the Salt Lake City temple was being built, the Saints established and utilized an Endowment House where they could perform these sacred ordinances, such as sealings and endowments, that would traditionally be done in the temple. The architecture of the temples built in Utah during the Pioneer Period, specifically the Salt Lake Temple, were meant to have a "civic as well as religious function," as government and religion were thoroughly intertwined while the Latter-day Saints dominated the area.

=== St. George Temple ===
The first temple that was ever built in Utah was the St. George Temple which took about six years to build. This temple was designed by Truman O. Angell and was completed in 1877. The architecture of this temple was constructed in a manner that resembled the architecture of the Nauvoo Temple, a temple that the members were forced to abandon three decades earlier.

=== Salt Lake City Temple ===
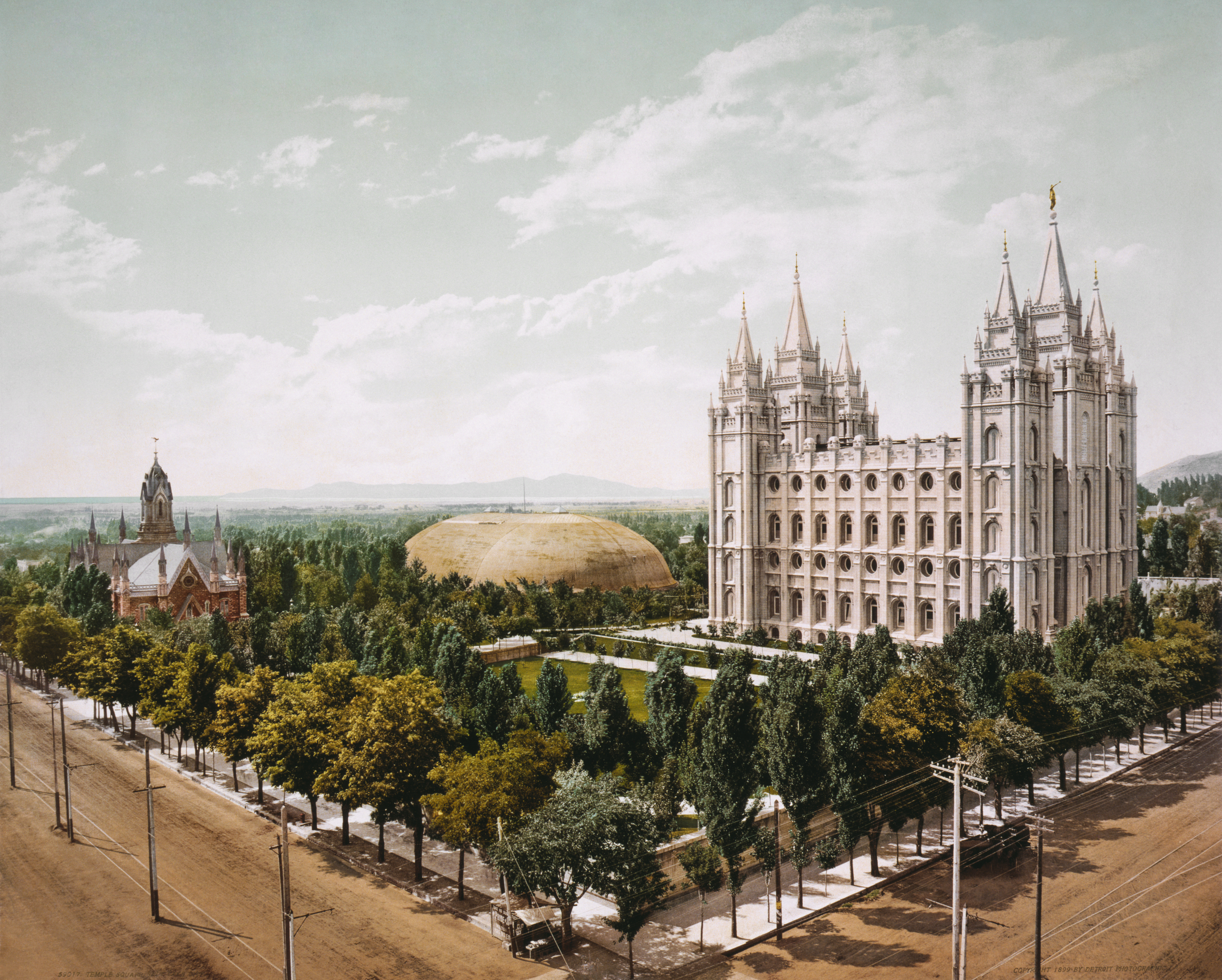
Temple Square, Salt Lake City, 1899

The Salt Lake Temple was the first temple that the saints started to build in Utah, though the St. George Temple was the first completed and operational temple in Utah. The construction of the Salt Lake temple took over 40 years to complete, as opposed to the six years it took to build the St. George Temple. The temple follows several types of architecture. One main style is the Gothic style, which can be seen in the pointed arches and elongated windows of the Temple. The Temple also has Romanesque elements. The foundation is made out of limestone and the exterior walls are made out of quartz which are sturdy and precious materials. One aspect that differentiates this temple from others is that there are special rooms for the First Presidency of the Church to meet, one specific room being the Holy of Holies. To many, this temple is seen as an all-encompassing representation of the Church of Jesus Christ of Latter-day Saints. Because of its elaborate and intricate design, it stands as a popular tourist attraction for many when they come to visit Temple Square in Salt Lake City, Utah.

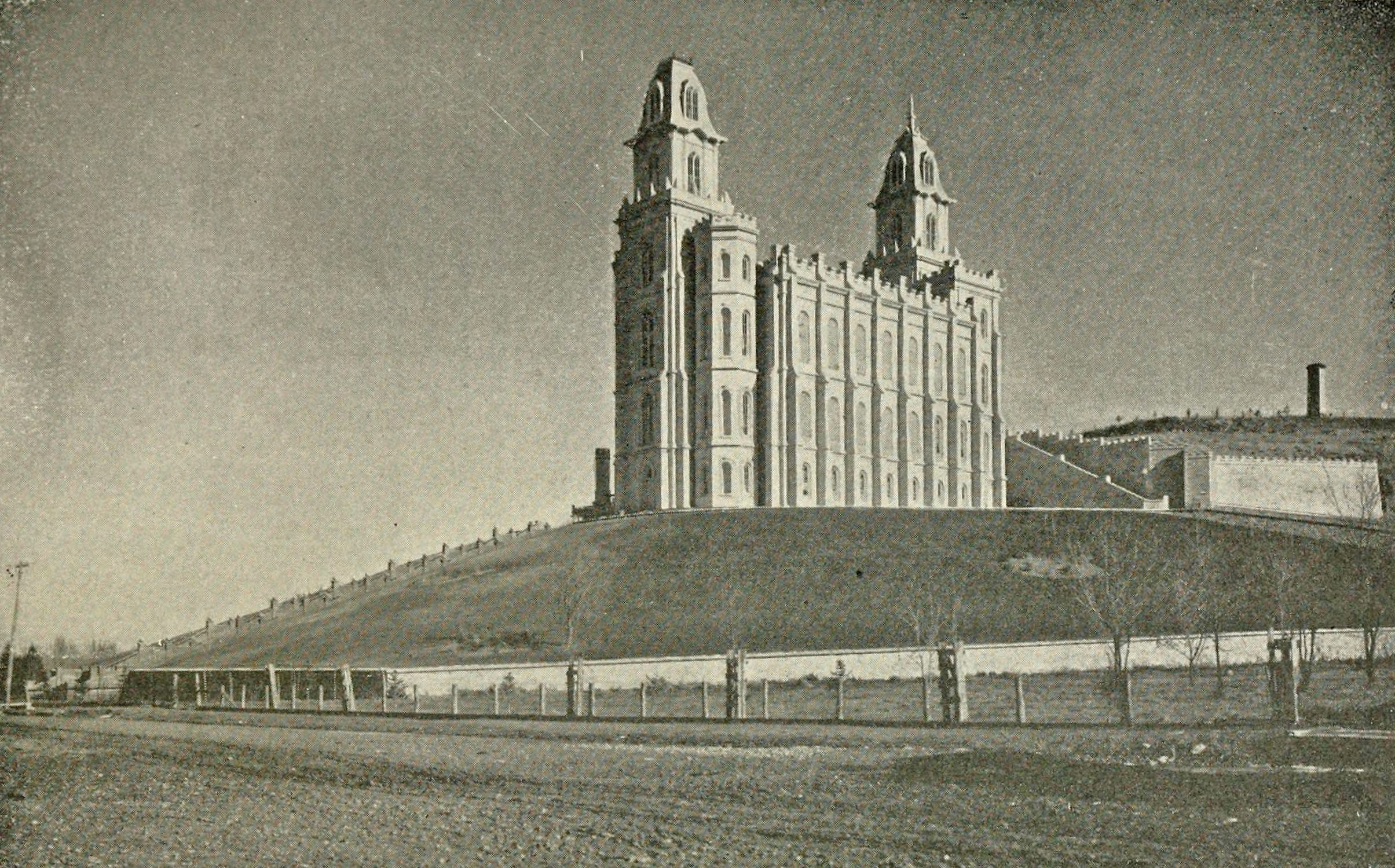
Manti Temple in Utah, 1914.

=== Manti Temple ===
The Manti Temple was the third temple to be dedicated in Utah. It was dedicated on May 17, 1888. Like the Salt Lake Temple, this Temple also contains some Gothic elements, but is a classic example of the Pioneer style. The temple is modeled after two earlier temples, the Nauvoo Temple and Kirtland Temple, which the early saints built before they trekked across the plains to Utah. This temple was built on the Manti Stone Quarry, which is now known as Temple Hill. It exterior is built from a cream color limestone from the quarry. Several unique aspects of this temple is that, in the towers there are self-supported spiral staircases that span 5 levels. Also, this is one of few temples that does not have an Angel Moroni on the spiral.

== Religious Architecture ==
In addition to temples, members of the Church of Jesus Christ of Latter-day Saints needed other, more common buildings devoted to daily or weekly religious matters. These church buildings consisted of what Latter-day Saint members refer to as meetinghouses, which were plain in design and material, where weekly church services were held with a small number of people. Members also established stake centers where larger groups of members could congregate and worship, though less frequently. The design of these church buildings varied based on the religious purpose. The more religiously esteemed or valued a church building was, the more funding and attention to the architectural design it received.

=== 1847-1860 ===
When the church was first organized, people normally met in one room of a house or the upstairs of a building. However, once the church had gathered in Utah, one room buildings were built and used as meeting houses, but also served other, often secular purposes. As years went, on more established designs including columns and steeples began to be included in the development of meetinghouses. The use of columns and steeples was a style that was known as "eclectic or of vernacular 'high style.'" This style was a simple, yet effective architectural style in providing religious enlightenment with the steeple symbolizing the connection between heaven and earth.

=== 1860-1890 ===
As the church grew and more financially acquit in Utah, more meetinghouses were built with features recognized by members today. Joseph Don Carlos Young, the son of Brigham Young, was a prominent architect during this time. One of his most significant accomplishments in his architectural career was his creation of the Brigham Young Academy in 1890.

== Pioneer Homes ==
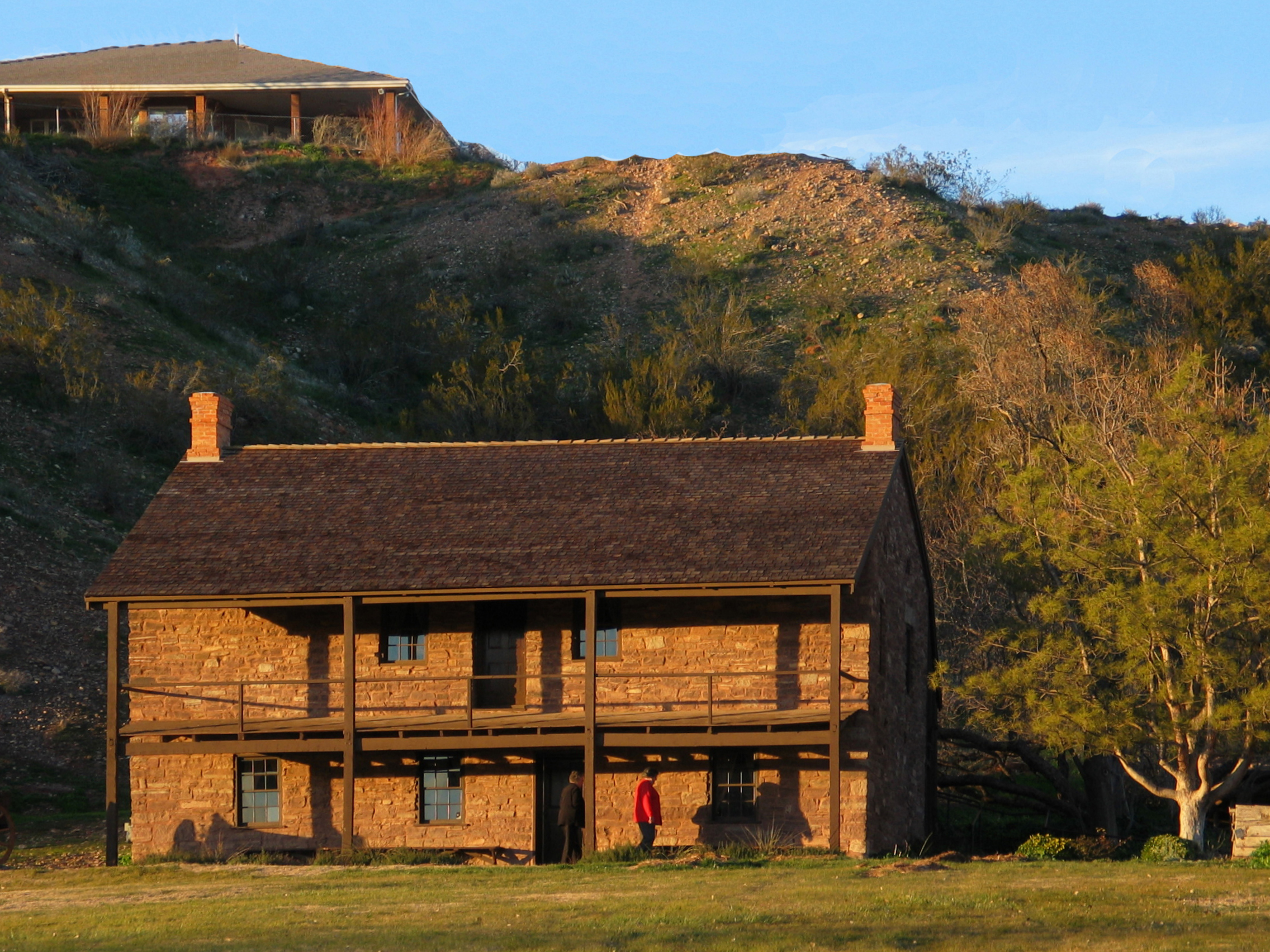
Jacob Hamblin House built in 1862, Santa Clara, Utah

=== Polygamous Homes ===
Polygamy was practiced during the early days of the Church of Jesus Christ of Latter-day Saints. In many situations, plural wives would live together in one home rather than spread out individually. Consequently, homes would be built in a way that had designated quarters or divisions to give each wife a private section. Living situations among the wives were determined based on income, number of wives, and how well the wives got along.

== Theatres, Schools, and other Institutions ==
The Church of Jesus Christ of Latter-day Saints emphasized and valued entertainment in ways such as theatre and music. Eventually, the Salt Lake Theatre was established and stood as an excellent theatre to all who visited. In addition the theatres, education was a value that many English-born and northern American members brought with them to Utah. This resulting in the establishment of many schools. The Mormon Tabernacle Choir eventually evolved from the Nauvoo Choir and was established in the 1850s.

=== Theatres ===
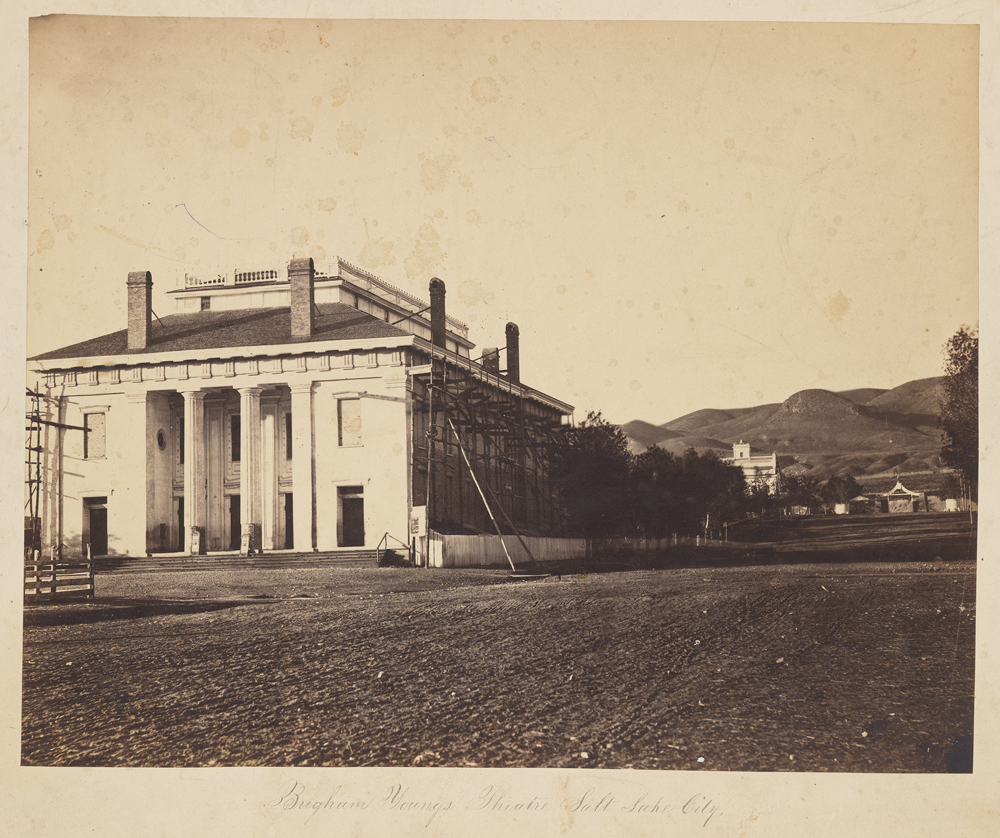
Brigham Young's Theatre, Salt Lake City, 1868-1870

After the Saints arrived in the Salt Lake Valley and established themselves, a need for entertainment emerged. While traveling across the plains, the Saint's source of entertainment came from singing and dancing around the campfire when they had the energy. The first performances were performed in places of worship, one in particular being the Bowery. Associations such as The Desert Drama Association were created. The first actual theatre was the Social Hall, then the Bowrings Theatre, and then the Salt Lake Theatre. These were all built before 1862. The Salt Lake Theatre was one of the most popular attractions for sixty years. It was only until after World War I when the film industry increased that the Theatre lost popularity and was eventually demolished in 1928. The buildings focused on replicating opera houses resulting in very elegant architecture. While these buildings did not contain the same sacredness as the temples, they still received the same dedication, focus, and craftsmanship in their construction.

=== Schools ===
The first schools were often held in the one room meetinghouse the Saints also used for church services. Education in Utah was one that consisted of Mormon schools, anti-Mormon schools, and religious schools of other denominations.

=== The Tabernacle ===
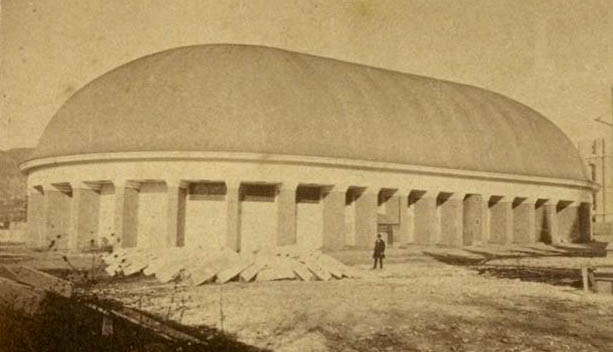
Mormon Tabernacle in the 1870s

In order for the members to have large gatherings where they could hear both the choir and the church leaders, buildings such as the Tabernacle were built. Architecturally, the Tabernacle served as a middle ground between the extravagance of the temples and the plainness of the meetinghouses. This building was built under the direction of President Brigham Young. The tabernacle has a unique style which consists of an expansive dome cover, allowing sound to reverberate well throughout the building. It is a two story building with a main floor and a balcony. Saints gathered here for general conference until 2000 when the Conference Center was built.
