= Who's Who of Southern Africa =

Who's Who of Southern Africa is the name of an annual print publication distributed in Southern Africa, containing biographical information about prominent professionals in the Southern African region. According to the website, Southern Africa consists of South Africa, Namibia, Botswana, Zimbabwe, Lesotho, Swaziland and Mozambique. The book has been a source of information regarding noteworthy people in Southern Africa for over 100 years.

Similar publications exist around the world, including the more famous annual British publication, Who's Who, published since 1849 and the Who's Who in American Art, a listing of prominent American artists.

The original print publication provided lists of names and some biographical details of notable individuals in Southern Africa. Like the British version, inclusion was decided by a members prominence in public life, and /or his or her professional achievements.

An online listing of the print publication was launched in 2001. The online Who's Who of Southern Africa consists of an interactive website of the same name and includes profiles of well known people born or living in the Southern African region. This listing includes noteworthy professionals, popular sports men and women, entertainers and politicians. For the purposes of the website the definition of the Southern African region was extended to include profiles of people from Angola, Zambia, Madagascar and Malawi.

The online resource was opened to the public in January 2010 to allow anyone 18 years or older living or born in the region to register on the site and create a profile of themselves. The original Who's Whos are differentiated from the new members by a badge or ribbon located on the profile image. The website is used as an online research resource by the public, and as a networking and online reputation management platform for members.

Unlike printed versions of the resource, the online version of Who's Who of Southern Africa does not exclude deceased members, but instead lists them under obituaries.

Inclusion in both the print publication and online version is free and relegated by merit, distinguishing Who's Who of Southern Africa from the Who's Who scams with which the Who's Who titles are sometimes marred.

The Who's Who of Southern Africa website is owned and managed by Naspers Limited.

According to sources, publication of the print version was halted in 2007, and remains so to date. The Naspers group retains the marks and rights associated with the print publication."
