= Rowan Taylor (composer) =

American composer (1927–2005)

Rowan S. Taylor (1927–2005) was an American composer and conductor. Taylor composed over 250 symphonies in addition to his concertos, songs, chamber works, operas, choral works, and ballets. His works have been performed all over the world. Taylor received both his bachelor's and master's degrees from Brigham Young University. He studied at UCLA for three years before teaching at Pierce College where he taught for 39 years. He has been honored for his teaching and his works. In his personal life, Taylor was a member of the Church of Jesus Christ of Latter-day Saints. He married Priscilla Pulliam in 1957 and had nine children.

== Biography ==
Taylor was born in Ogden, Utah, in 1927. After attaining his Bachelor of Arts and Master of Arts at Brigham Young University, he spent three years studying at UCLA before he moved to Whittier, California, to teach at Los Angeles Pierce College. He taught there for 39 years. During the Korean War, Taylor served as a Chaplain's assistant in the United States Army. The Book of Lights, by Chaim Potok, features a character based on Taylor. Taylor married Priscilla Pulliam, a pianist, in 1957 and had nine children. The Taylors sometimes performed as a musical family. Taylor's work has been performed by symphonies all over the world, and he is considered to be one of the most prolific modern symphonists.

Taylor was a member of the Church of Jesus Christ of Latter-Day Saints with pioneer ancestry. He was one of the contributors to Mormoniana, a book of music written exclusively by Mormon composers and artists. He was the president of the Association of Mormon Composers and Performers. He also co-edited a special dialogue issue of A Journal of Mormon Thought in 1975.

== Works ==
Throughout his life, Taylor wrote over 250 symphonies, 46 concertos, thousands of individual songs, and hundreds of chamber works.

=== Notable works ===
- Coriantumr, an oratorio based on a passage in the Book of Mormon
- Papa and the Playhouse, a musical about the Salt Lake Theater
- O God, Where Art Thou?, a cantata
- San Bernardino, a full-length pageant
- Poetry and Penny Candy, a children's ballet
- The Birthmark, an opera about Nathaniel Hawthorne

== Honors ==
Taylor was reportedly awarded the following honors:

- Best teacher at Pierce College, fifth best teacher in the United States, 2001, www.gradeyourprof.com
- International Man of the Year, 1991 and 1992
- World Who's Who Hall of Fame, 1996, International Biographical Centre
- Outstanding Man of the Century, 21st Century
