= Nihon Tarento Meikan =

- Original title: Nihon Tarento Nenkan
- Language: Japanese
- Release number: 44 (All main books; as of 2016)
- Subject: Biography; reference work
- Publisher: VIP Times
- Publication date: 1970–
- Publication place: Japan
- Pages: 310 (Nihon Tarento Nenkan '70)
- Website: VIP Times official website

Nihon Tarento Meikan (日本 タレント 名鑑; "Japan Talent Directory") is a Japanese illustrated annual directory of Japanese entertainers, or tarentos, issued by VIP Times Inc. that was first published in 1970. The directory's company established on 1969 and its current representative director is Mutsuko Igusa.

== Overview ==
Genres of entertainers and their offices are described in many profiles which are active in Japan. It is adopted as a portal site of entertainer database.

It is first published on 1970 as Nihon Tarento Nenkan (日本 タレント 年鑑; "Japan Talent Yearbook"). It is renamed to Nihon Tarento Meikan from 1973.

VIP Times Company is founded by Shigetaro Igusa who has an experience of television stations during his time at office, and felt the need of the photos, names, and agencies can be triggered in its first issue.

== History ==
VIP Time's predecessor Leisure Tsūshin-sha was established on 1968, which Shigetaro Igusa was appointed as representative director. It issued the leisure newspaper, VIP Times, that introduced attractions, historic sites, and entertainment industry news around Japan. It was issued until November 1986 which made 537 issues.

On 1970, Nihon Tarento Nenkan (later renamed to Nihon Tarento Meikan from 1973) launched. The company's name changed into VIP Times Company on 1971. It was released in CD-ROM from 1995 to 2001.

In June 2002, Mutsuko Igusa was later appointed as the representative director. In May 2004, the website Yahoo! Japan uses the company's profiles. Websites Goo and Infoseek uses the book's profiles on 2005.

In April 2006, they started a service called Taleme Casting. The company later launched Nihon Tarento Meikan Kids & Junior on October. On 2008, websites Oricon, Fresh Eye, Engeki Life, Nippon TV, and MSN Japan also use their profiles. In December 2008, they launched the mobile site, Talent Prof, and ended on March 31, 2010. Websites BIGLOBE, Interactive Program Guide, and Fuji Television later uses its profiles on 2009. In June 2010, the website Will Media also uses its profiles.

== Publications ==
This is the list of all the publications.

- Nihon Tarento Nenkan '70: Year Book of Talents in Japan (1970)
- Nihon Tarento Meikan '73: Talent Who's Who in Japan (1973)
- Nihon Tarento Meikan '74: Talent Who's Who in Japan (1974)
- Nihon Tarento Meikan '75: Talent Who's Who in Japan (1975)
- Nihon Tarento Meikan '76: Talent Who's Who in Japan (1976)
- Nihon Tarento Meikan '77: Talent Who's Who in Japan (1977)
- Nihon Tarento Meikan '78: Talent Who's Who in Japan (1978)
- Nihon Tarento Meikan '79: Talent Who's Who in Japan (1979)
- Nihon Tarento Meikan '80: Talent Who's Who in Japan (1980)
- Nihon Tarento Meikan '81: Talent Who's Who in Japan (1981)
- Nihon Tarento Meikan '82: Talent Who's Who in Japan (1982)
- Nihon Tarento Meikan '83: Talent Who's Who in Japan (1983)
- Nihon Tarento Meikan '84: Talent Who's Who in Japan (1984)
- Nihon Tarento Meikan '85: Talent Who's Who in Japan (1985)
- Nihon Tarento Meikan '86: Talent Who's Who in Japan (1986)
- Nihon Tarento Meikan '87: Talent Who's Who in Japan (1987)
- Nihon Tarento Meikan '88: Talent Who's Who in Japan (1988)
- Nihon Tarento Meikan '89: Talent Who's Who in Japan (1989)
- Nihon Tarento Meikan '90: Talent Who's Who in Japan (1990)
- Nihon Tarento Meikan '91: Talent Who's Who in Japan (1991)
- Nihon Tarento Meikan '92: Talent Who's Who in Japan (1992)
- Nihon Tarento Meikan '93: Talent Who's Who in Japan (1993)
- Nihon Tarento Meikan '94: Talent Who's Who in Japan (1994)
- Nihon Tarento Meikan '95: Talent Who's Who in Japan (1995)
- Nihon Tarento Meikan '96: Talent Who's Who in Japan (1996)
- Nihon Tarento Meikan '97: Talent Who's Who in Japan (1997)
- Nihon Tarento Meikan '98: Talent Who's Who in Japan (1998)
- Nihon Tarento Meikan 1999: Talent Who's Who in Japan (1999)
- Nihon Tarento Meikan 2000: Talent Who's Who in Japan (18 April 2000)
- Nihon Tarento Meikan '01-'02: Talent Who's Who in Japan (28 April 2001)
- Nihon Tarento Meikan 2002: Talent Who's Who in Japan (30 April 2002)
- Nihon Tarento Meikan 2003: Talent Who's Who in Japan (30 April 2003)
- Nihon Tarento Meikan 2004: Talent Who's Who in Japan (8 April 2004)
- Nihon Tarento Meikan 2005: Talent Who's Who in Japan (1 April 2005)
- Nihon Tarento Meikan 2006: Talent Who's Who in Japan (1 April 2006)
- Nihon Tarento Meikan Kids & Junior 2007 (24 October 2006)
- Nihon Tarento Meikan 2007: Talent Who's Who in Japan (2007)
- Nihon Tarento Meikan Kids & Junior 2008 (2007)
- Nihon Tarento Meikan 2008: Talent Who's Who in Japan (1 April 2008)
- Nihon Tarento Meikan 2009: Talent Who's Who in Japan (2009)
- Nihon Tarento Meikan 2010: Talent Who's Who in Japan (2010)
- Nihon Tarento Meikan 2011: Talent Who's Who in Japan (7 February 2011)
- Nihon Tarento Meikan 2012: Talent Who's Who in Japan (27 January 2012)
- Nihon Tarento Meikan 2013: Talent Who's Who in Japan (29 January 2013)
- Nihon Tarento Meikan 2014: Talent Who's Who in Japan (30 January 2014)
- Nihon Tarento Meikan 2015: Talent Who's Who in Japan (28 January 2015)
- Nihon Tarento Meikan 2016: Talent Who's Who in Japan (27 January 2016)
- Nihon Tarento Meikan 2017: Talent Who's Who in Japan (27 January 2017)
