= International Biographical Centre =

British publisher

- Status: Dissolved - See External Links Below
- Country of origin: England
- Headquarters location: St Thomas' Place, Ely, Cambridgeshire
- Owner: Melrose Press Ltd.
- Official website: internationalbiographicalcentre.com

The International Biographical Centre was a publisher owned by Melrose Press Ltd that specializes in producing biographical publications, such as the Dictionary of International Biography, Great Men and Women of Science and other vanity awards. It is situated in Ely, Cambridgeshire in the United Kingdom.

Government consumer advocates have described it as a "scam" or as "pretty tacky". Its use to support the granting of a US O-1 visa (for individuals with an extraordinary ability) has been described by US employer Oracle Corporation as purchasing "vanity accolades" to use as "phony credentials", with a warning that "visa fraud is a serious crime" with severe penalties.

In 2007, referring to the International Biographical Centre, the American Biographical Institute and Marquis Who's Who, Jan Margosian, consumer information coordinator for the Oregon Department of Justice, warned consumers to be wary and called the companies "pretty tacky", adding "I don't know why they would put you in there if they weren't hoping to get you to buy the book.. "You truly have to look at how they are marketing and what the spin is. It's something you might want to watch out for."

== Activity ==
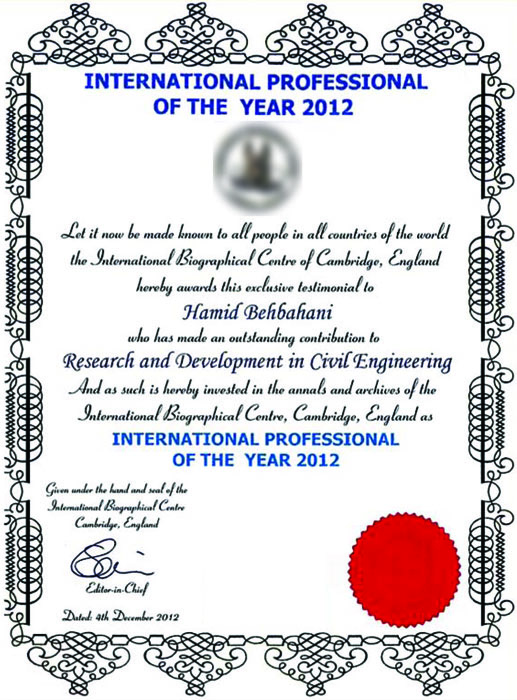
A typical IBC certificate

When it was still in business, the International Biographical Centre created "awards" and offered them widely. In 2004, an award was said to cost the recipient US$495 or £295, but in 2010 the cost could be as high as $395 for a Commemorative Medal or US$440 for a laminated certificate.

The Department of Commerce of the Government of Western Australia classified the Centre's offers as a scam and said:

"The material promoting the International Biographical Centre creates a false impression about the credentials of the organisation. It also wrongly implies that the receiver of the letter has been picked through a special research process considering their work and qualifications."

It quoted blog users who describe the publications as a "Who’s Who of gullible people".

== Biographical reference books ==
- 2000 Outstanding Europeans of the 21st Century
- 2000 Outstanding Intellectuals of the 20th Century
- 2000 Outstanding Intellectuals of the 21st Century
- 2000 Outstanding Scientists - 2010
- The Cambridge Blue Book
- Dictionary of International Biography
- Great Men and Women of Science
- International Who's Who in Music
- Men of achievement
- Outstanding People of the 20th Century
- Outstanding People of the 21st Century
- Outstanding Scientists of the 21st Century
- Who’s Who in the 21st Century
- World Who's Who of Women

== See also ==
- Who's Who scam
- American Biographical Institute
