= Joseph Smith =

Founder of the Latter Day Saint movement (1805–1844)

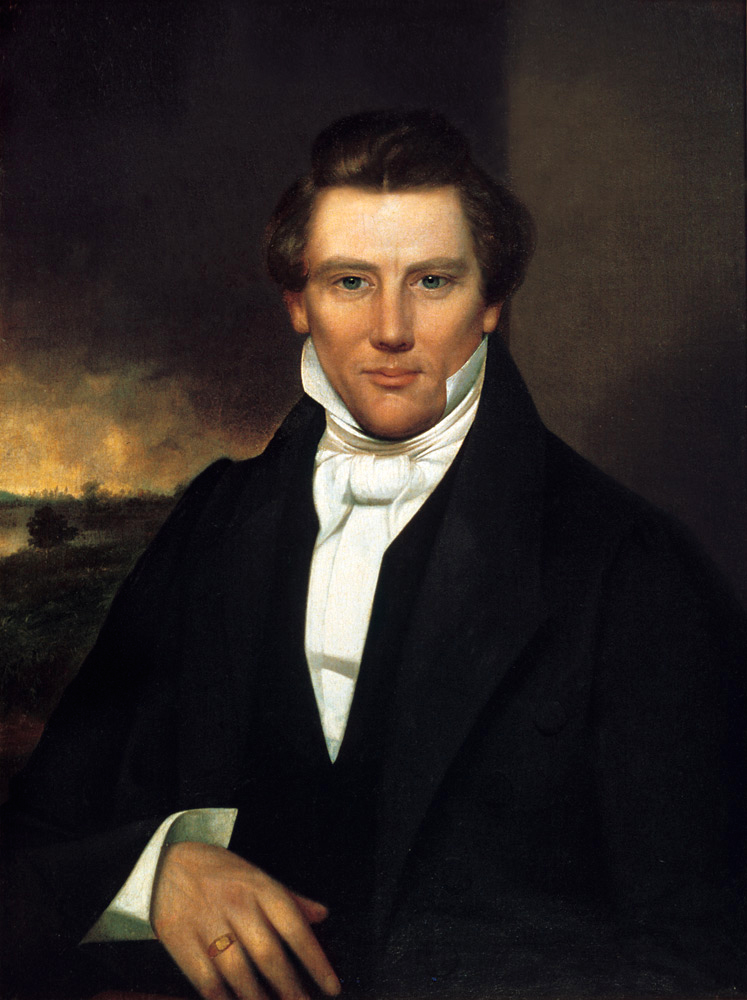
- Portrait attributed to William Warner Major, c. 1842

1st President of the Church of Christ (Note: Church of Christ was the official name on April 6, 1830. In 1834, the official name was changed to Church of the Latter Day Saints and then in 1838 to Church of Jesus Christ of Latter Day Saints. The spelling "The Church of Jesus Christ of Latter-day Saints" was adopted by the LDS Church in Utah in 1851, after Joseph Smith's death in 1844, and is today specified in Doctrine and Covenants.)
- April 6, 1830 – June 27, 1844
- Successor: Disputed (Note: Brigham Young, Sidney Rigdon, Joseph Smith III, and at least four others each claimed succession.)
- End reason: Death

2nd Mayor of Nauvoo, Illinois

In office
- May 19, 1842 – June 27, 1844
- Predecessor: John C. Bennett
- Successor: Chancy Robison
- Political party: Independent

Personal details
- Born: December 23, 1805; Sharon, Vermont, U.S.
- Died: June 27, 1844 (aged 38); Carthage, Illinois, U.S.
- Cause of death: Gunshot wounds
- Resting place: Smith Family Cemetery, Nauvoo, Illinois, U.S. 40.54052°N 91.39244°W
- Known For: Founding Mormonism
- Spouse(s): Emma Smith (m. 1827) and 30–40 others (See List of Joseph Smith's wives) (Note: Estimates vary, but most historians generally place the number of Smith's polygamous wives as between 30 and 40. For example: Smith (1994, p. 14) counts 42; Quinn (1994, pp. 587–88) counts 46; Compton (1997, p. 11) counts at least 33; Bushman (2005, pp. 437, 644) counts 32; Davenport (2022, p. 139) counts 37.)
- Children: Julia; Joseph III; Alexander; David; others
- Parents: Joseph Smith Sr. (father); Lucy Mack Smith (mother)
- Relatives: Alvin Smith (brother); Hyrum Smith (brother); Samuel H. Smith (brother); William Smith (brother); Katharine Smith (sister); Don Carlos Smith (brother); Lucy Smith (sister)
- Signature

Joseph Smith Jr. (December 23, 1805 – June 27, 1844) was an American religious and political leader and the founder of Mormonism and the Latter Day Saint movement. Publishing the Book of Mormon at the age of 24, Smith attracted tens of thousands of followers by the time of his death fourteen years later. The religious movement he founded is followed by millions of global adherents and several churches, the largest of which is the Church of Jesus Christ of Latter-day Saints (LDS Church).

Born in Sharon, Vermont, Smith moved with his family to Western New York amid hardships following a series of crop failures in 1816. Living in an area of intense religious revivalism during the Second Great Awakening, Smith reported experiencing a series of visions. The first of these was in 1820, when he saw "two personages" (whom he eventually described as God the Father and Jesus Christ). In 1823, he said he was visited by an angel who directed him to a buried book of golden plates inscribed with a Judeo-Christian history of an ancient American civilization. In 1830, Smith published the Book of Mormon, which he described as an English translation of those plates. The same year he organized the Church of Christ, calling it a restoration of the early Christian Church. Members of the church were later called Latter Day Saints or nicknamed the Mormons.

In 1831, Smith and his followers moved west, planning to build a communal Zion in the American heartland. They first gathered in Kirtland, Ohio, and established an outpost in Independence, Missouri, which was intended to be Zion's central location. During the 1830s, Smith sent out missionaries, published revelations, and supervised construction of the Kirtland Temple. Smith and his followers left Ohio and Missouri after the collapse of the church-sponsored Kirtland Safety Society and violent skirmishes with non-Mormon Missourians escalated into the Mormon extermination order. They established a new settlement at Nauvoo, Illinois, which quickly grew to be the second-largest city in Illinois during Smith's mayoralty.

Smith launched a presidential campaign in 1844. During his campaign, Smith and the Nauvoo City Council ordered the destruction of the Nauvoo Expositor's printing press after it criticized Smith's power and his practice of polygamy. This inflamed opposition to Smith and his followers. Smith surrendered to Illinois authorities but was shot and killed by a mob that stormed the jailhouse.

During his ministry, Smith published numerous documents and texts, many of which he attributed to divine inspiration and revelation from God. He dictated the majority of these in the first-person, saying they were the writings of ancient prophets or expressed the voice of God. His followers accepted his teachings as prophetic and revelatory, and several of these texts were canonized by denominations of the Latter Day Saint movement, which continue to treat them as scripture. Smith's teachings discuss God's nature, cosmology, family structures, political organization, and religious community and authority. Mormons generally regard Smith as a prophet comparable to Moses and Elijah. Several religious denominations identify as the continuation of the church that he organized, including the LDS Church and the Community of Christ.

== Life ==
After growing up in New York, Joseph Smith founded a church and moved to Kirtland, Ohio. Facing bank fraud charges, he fled to Far West, Missouri. Jailed for treason against Missouri, Smith escaped to Illinois and founded the city of Nauvoo.

In New York, Smith co-founded a church and published The Book of Mormon. After minister Sidney Rigdon and his followers converted, Smith moved to Ohio to join them.

Smith urged followers to settle in Independence, Missouri, but hostile residents forced them out. He organized a militia to retake the town, but disbanded it when his small, cholera-stricken force faced superior opposition. Back in Ohio, Smith built a house of worship as his following grew, but polygamy and an illegal bank led to denunciations and legal troubles.

Smith fled to Far West, Missouri, until a Mormon militia, provoked by vigilantes, looted and burned three towns. After his followers fired on the state militia, the governor ordered them expelled. Smith was arrested for treason but later escaped.

In Illinois, Smith founded a new city and temple, but his secret polygamy led some close associates to denounce him. When dissenters published a paper exposing him, he ordered their press destroyed. Facing arrest, Smith declared martial law and mobilized his militia, prompting the state militia to mobilize in response.

Smith fled to Iowa but soon returned, accepting the Illinois governor's assurances of protection if he surrendered. Expecting to receive bail, Smith learned he also faced treason charges for declaring martial law. When locals, aware of Smith's history of jailbreak, heard he was guarded by only a few men, they stormed the jail. After initially assuming his own men had come to rescue him, Smith defended himself from the lynch mob, using a smuggled pistol to wound three, before he was shot and killed. His murderers, fearing the arrival of Smith's followers, fled the scene.

=== Early years (1805–1827) ===
Joseph Smith was born on December 23, 1805, in Vermont to Joseph Smith Sr. and Lucy Mack Smith. One of eleven children, Smith was a descendent of the influential colonial minister John Lothropp (1584–1653). Joseph's maternal grandfather, Solomon Mack (1732 – 1820), self-published a memoir about his own conversion experience.

Smith's childhood was marked by hardship. Joseph Sr.'s drunkenness was a source of embarrassment. When seven-year-old Joseph Jr. underwent painful surgery for a leg bone infection, the boy refused alcohol. He used crutches for three years and walked with a slight limp thereafter. After Joseph Sr. fell for a ginseng swindle followed by years of crop failures, the Smiths lost the family farm and were forced to travel 300 miles (480 km) west to frontier Western New York, where they took out a mortgage on a small farm.

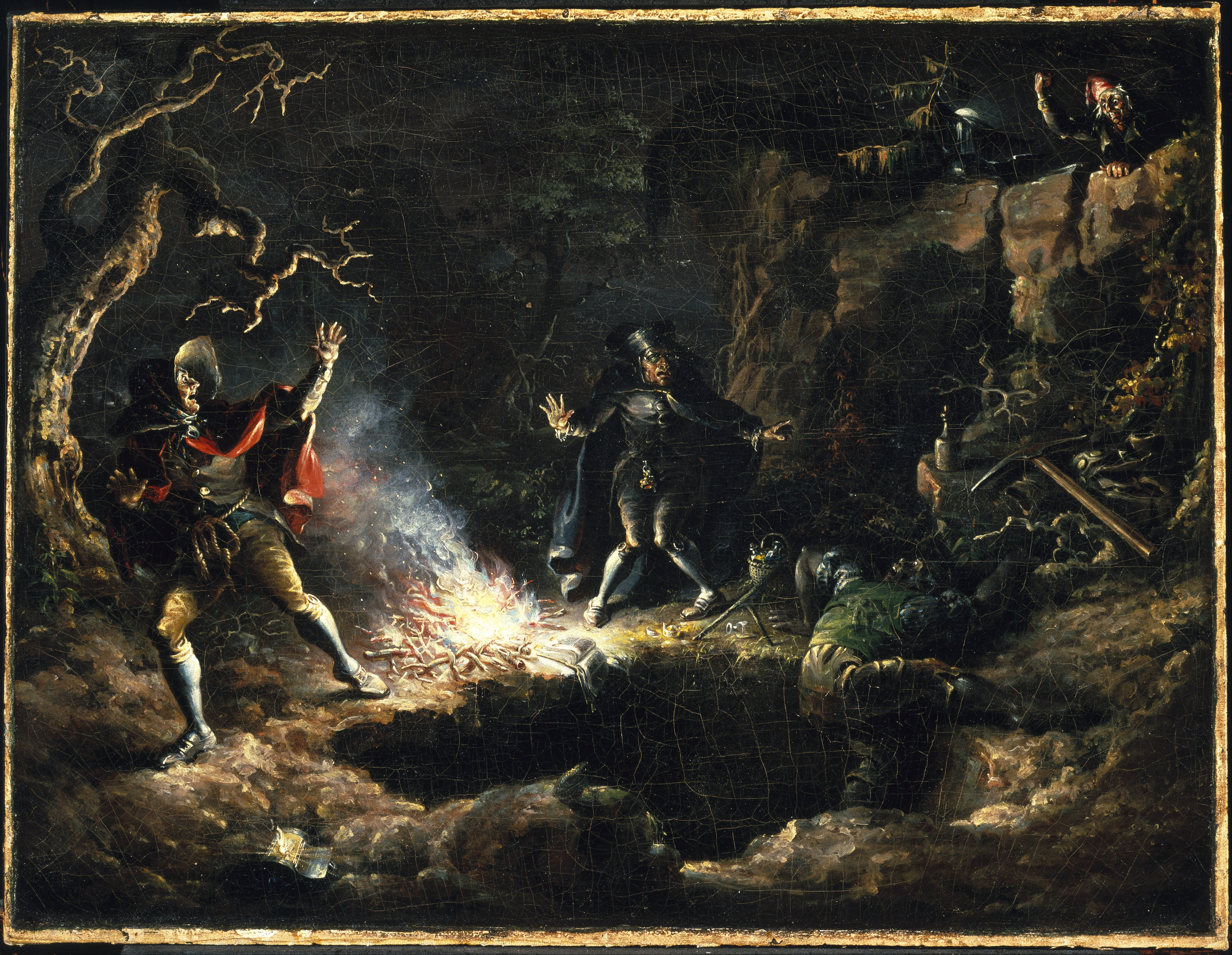
Night-time treasure digs were a common practice in New England, as shown in "The Money Diggers" (1832) by artist John Quidor.

The Smiths engaged in folk magic, a relatively common practice in that time and place. Joseph, his father, and his older brother Alvin hunted for treasure under the direction of a seer named Luman Walters. Before Walters left professing he lacked sufficient power, he singled out young Joseph Smith as the young man who might be able to find the treasure. After Walters left, the Smiths continued using folk magic and a seer stone to look for buried treasure.

Joseph, his family, and his acquaintances consistently listed September 21, 1823, the equinox, as a pivotal night in his life; the next day, he told his father that he had been visited in the night by a supernatural being who revealed the location of a nearby treasure. The Smith family believed in prophetic dreams or visions; both parents and his maternal grandfather had previously reported such dreams.

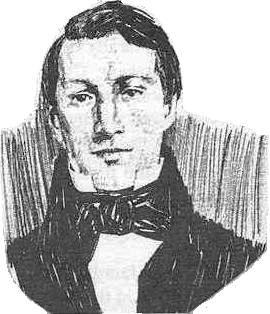
Joseph's older brother Alvin died in 1823.

Just weeks later, Alvin complained of stomach pains and called for a doctor who treated him with mercury salts. The substance lodged in Alvin's digestive system, and multiple other doctors were helpless to dislodge it. Alvin, only 25, died from mercury poisoning due to medical error. Joseph Sr. and Jr.'s trust in authorities was further shaken when the Presbyterian minister presiding over the funeral suggested Alvin had gone to hell. The family became divided by faith: Joseph and his father refused to join the church, while Joseph's mother and siblings joined.

One year after Joseph's dream, the Smiths reportedly attempted and failed to obtain the treasure. On September 29, 1824, Joseph Sr. published a notice in the paper announcing that he had briefly disinterred Alvin's body to confirm it had not been removed. Rumors spread that the Smiths had exhumed Alvin's body for use in magical treasure-seeking.

In the wake of Alvin's death, the family faced further financial hardships and worked odd jobs. Smith and his father achieved a reputation as treasure seers for hire. In 1825, Joseph's friend Josiah Jr. told his father Josiah Stowell about the two Smiths, and Josiah Sr. hired them to locate for a lost mine he believed might be on his property in Pennsylvania. While boarding in Pennsylvania, Smith met Emma Hale, his future wife. After about a month in Pennsylvania, the company disbanded and Smith returned to Chenango, New York where he worked for Stowell and his friend Joseph Knight Sr., along with making trips to court Emma Hale.

In New York, Smith directed further treasure digs for Knight and Stowell until March. That month, Josiah Stowell's nephew Peter Bridgeman filed a complaint against Joseph Smith, alleging he was taking advantage of the elder Stowell by engaging in "glass-looking", or using fortune-telling to attempt to find treasure. Smith was arrested and taken to trial, where Josiah Stowell testified that he believed Smith had the ability to find treasures by use of a seer stone. While the precise result of the proceeding remains unclear, Smith was freed and returned home to Palmyra.

Smith and Emma eloped and married on January 18, 1827, over the objections of her father Isaac Hale who regarded Smith as a charlatan. The couple began boarding with Smith's parents in Manchester, but after Smith promised to abandon treasure seeking, Hale offered to let the couple live on his property in Harmony and help Smith get started in business.

Josiah Stowell and Joseph Knight, Smith's patrons, travelled to Palmyra for the anticipated recovery of the treasure on September 22, 1827. Smith, with Emma, left home that night, returning with a report that treasures had been recovered, but that he had hidden them inside a hollow log for safekeeping. Days later, he returned home with a set of plates which could be hefted but not viewed. Smith explained he had been commanded not to show the plates to anyone else.

Upon hearing Smith had obtained a treasure, Smith's former treasure-seeking partners believed he had double crossed them and kept all the treasure to himself. After they ransacked places where they believed the plates might have been hidden, Smith decided to leave Palmyra.

=== Writing a book and founding a church (1827–1830) ===
In October 1827, Smith and Emma permanently moved to Pennsylvania, funded by a relatively prosperous neighbor, Martin Harris in exchange for a share in Smith's upcoming book. There, Smith began dictating a text to wife Emma until April 1828, when Martin Harris took over dictation.

The process broke down after Smith allowed Harris to take possession of the only copy of the first 116 pages of manuscript, which were subsequently lost. Smith ended the dictation process, explaining that an angel had taken away the plates as punishment for having lost the manuscript pages.

On June 15, Emma and Joseph's first child, a son, was born but died the same day. Joseph joined his wife's church, the Methodists, becoming an "exhorter" for the group. He continued as a Methodist until one of his wife's cousins objected to inclusion of a "practicing necromancer" on the Methodist class roll, and Smith left the group.

Smith's first revelation, which he and followers interpreted as a direct communication from God, announced that the material covered in the lost pages, which had been translated from the plates of Lehi, would be replaced by new translation drawn from the plates of Nephi. Smith resumed dictation of the book to Emma in September 1828, In April 1829, he was joined by Oliver Cowdery, a distant cousin from Vermont who had also dabbled in folk magic. The two worked on the manuscript, later moving into the home of Cowdery's friend Peter Whitmer, where they completed it.

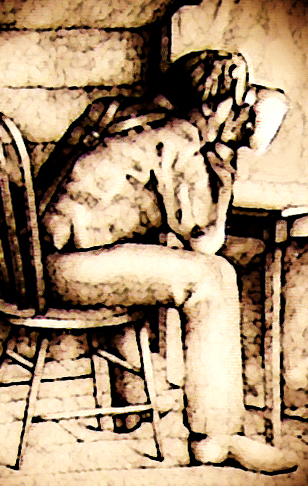
Smith dictated most of the Book of Mormon by looking into a seer stone placed in a stovepipe hat.

Smith dictated by using the same chocolate-colored seer stone he had used previously for treasure hunting placed in a hat. (Note: Quinn (1998, pp. 171–73)) Dictation was completed about July 1, 1829. The completed work, titled the Book of Mormon, was published in Palmyra and first advertised for sale on March 26, 1830.

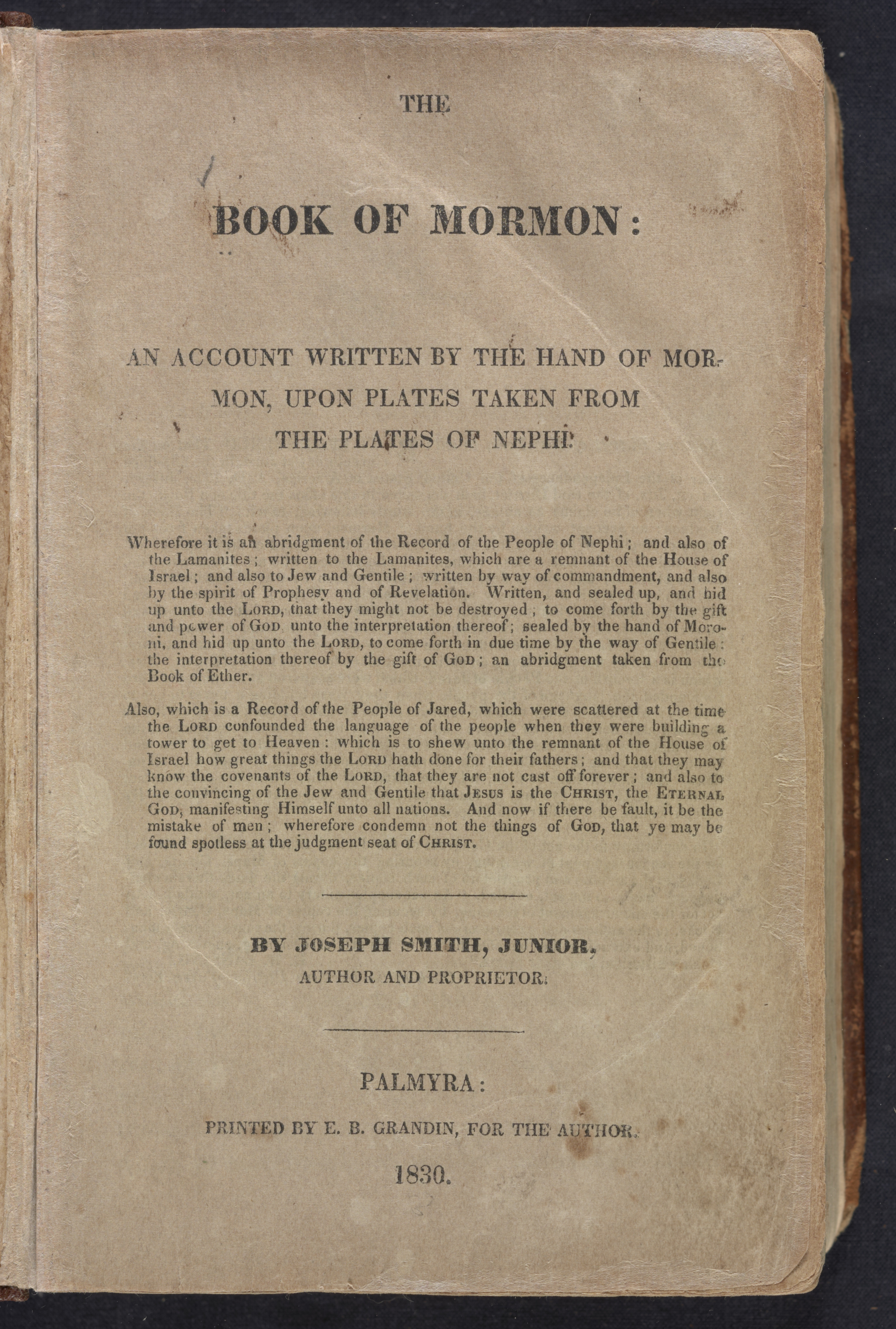
Cover page of the Book of Mormon, original 1830 edition

Less than two weeks later, on April 6, 1830, Smith and his followers formally organized the Church of Christ, and small branches were established in Manchester, Fayette, and Colesville, New York. As in 1826, he was arrested and charged with being a "disorderly person". Although he was acquitted, he was again arrested, this time transported to Broome County, where he was again acquitted by a three-judge panel. He and Cowdery fled to escape a gathering mob.

Cowdery, Peter Whitmer, and others traveled west on mission to proselytize to the Native Americans.

=== Success and schism in Ohio (1831–1838) ===
Church co-founder Oliver Cowdery and others left New York for Ohio. There they encountered the hugely-popular Campbellite minister Sidney Rigdon. Rigdon, who had long preached a Restoration of the true church, converted to the new movement, bringing along over a hundred followers. Rigdon's conversion dramatically swelled the ranks of the new organization. Rigdon visited New York, where he had extensive personal conversations with Smith. With growing opposition in New York, Smith announced a revelation that his followers should gather at Kirtland, Ohio.

Smith moved to Kirtland in January 1831. There, many of Rigdon's followers practiced Christian communism by sharing "From each according to his ability, to each according to his needs". In 1831, Smith began to privately teach the practice of polygamy, according to a variety of sources including apostles Brigham Young, Orson Pratt, and Lyman E. Johnson. Levi Lewis, Emma's cousin who had known Smith and Harris in Harmony, accused Smith of trying to seduce local girl Eliza Winters. According to Lewis, he had heard both Smith and Harris say that "adultery is no crime". That year, Smith told twelve-year old Mary Rollins that God had commanded him to take her as a wife; she would later be recognized by the church as one of Smith's plural wives in February 1842 at the age of 23.

The John Johnson family was baptized into Smith's church, including fifteen-year-old Marinda Johnson. For seven months, Smith and Rigdon lived at the Johnson farm. On March 24, 1832, a mob dragged Smith and Rigdon from their beds, beat them badly, and then tarred and feathered them. Simonds Ryder, writing in the 1860s, argued the attack was precipitated by recent converts having learned their property was to be placed under the church's control, a motivation corroborated in by S.F. Whitney.

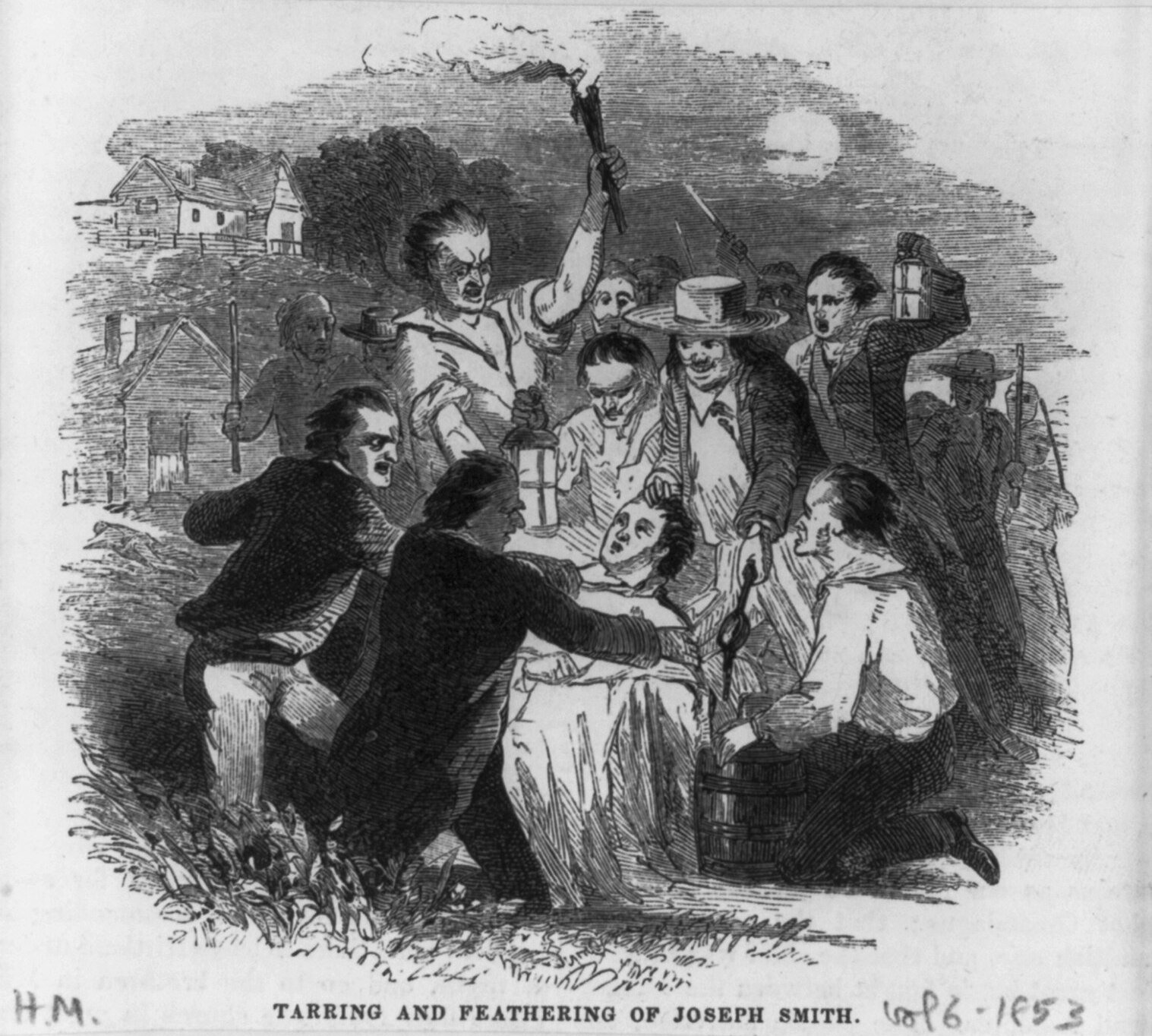
A mob tarred and feathered Smith and Rigdon on March 24, 1832. Smith was beaten, tied, stripped, scratched, burned, poisoned and almost castrated. His infant son died of measles soon thereafter, which the Smiths attributed to exposure to cold air during the attack.

Unlike Rigdon, Smith was tied to a board and stripped naked so a doctor could perform a castration. When the doctor refused to go through with the procedure, the mob tried to force poison down Smith's throat, chipping a tooth in the process. Despite the attack, Smith preached to his congregation the following morning and performed baptisms. His infant adopted son Joseph Murdock died of measles, the fourth child the Smiths had lost; his family linked his death to him being exposed to the cold during the attack.

In the 1880s, minister Clark Braden repeated a rumor that claimed Smith practiced polygamy in Kirtland and was intimate with Marinda, a claim later popularized by Fawn Brodie in her psychobiography of Smith. Though the theory has largely been rejected by later scholarship, Mormon polygamy historian Todd Compton speculates on the timing of the 1832 attack: "The castration attempt might be taken as evidence that the mob felt that Joseph had committed a sexual impropriety... they had planned the operation in advance, as they brought along a doctor to perform it. The first revelations on polygamy had been received in 1831... Also, Joseph Smith did tend to marry women who had stayed at his house or in whose house he had stayed." In 1842, Marinda, age 26, became one of Smith's wives.

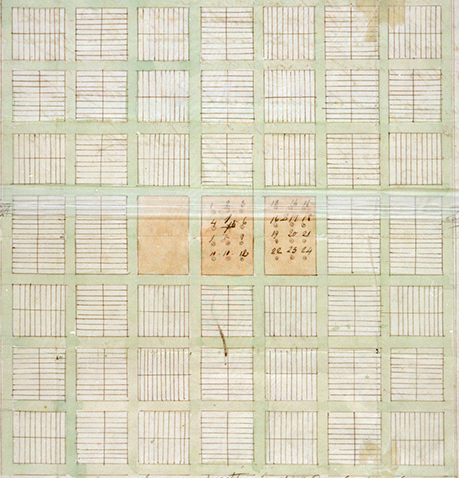
Joseph Smith drew up a comprehensive city plan for Zion (Independence), calling for 24 Mormon temples and a grid of streets along cardinal directions.

Converts poured into Kirtland. By the summer of 1835, there were fifteen hundred to two thousand members in the vicinity, many expecting Smith to lead them shortly to the Millennial kingdom.

In July 1831, Smith visited Independence, Jackson County, Missouri, and announced a revelation that the frontier hamlet was the "center place" of Zion. Smith visited Missouri again in early 1832 to prevent a rebellion of prominent church members who believed the church in Missouri was being neglected.

We are daily told, and not by the ignorant alone, but by all classes of them, that we...of this county are to be cut off, and our lands appropriated by them for inheritances.

— Address of Jackson County citizens

In Jackson County, existing Missouri residents resented the Latter Day Saint newcomers for both political and religious reasons. Additionally, their rapid growth aroused fears that they would soon constitute a majority in local elections, and thus "rule the county". Tension increased until July 1833, when non-Mormons forcibly evicted the Mormons and destroyed their property. Smith advised his followers to bear the violence patiently until after they had been attacked multiple times, after which they could fight back. Armed bands exchanged fire, killing one Mormon and two non-Mormons, until the old settlers forcibly expelled the Mormons from the county.

After petitions to the Missouri governor were unsuccessful, in May 1834 Smith organized and led a 200-man paramilitary expedition, called Zion's Camp, to aid church members in Jackson County, Missouri. As a military endeavor, the expedition was a failure. The men of the expedition were disorganized, a cholera outbreak killed 14, and they were severely outnumbered. By the end of June, Smith deescalated the confrontation, sought peace with Jackson County's residents, and disbanded Zion's Camp. Nevertheless, Zion's Camp transformed Latter Day Saint leadership because many future church leaders came from among the participants.

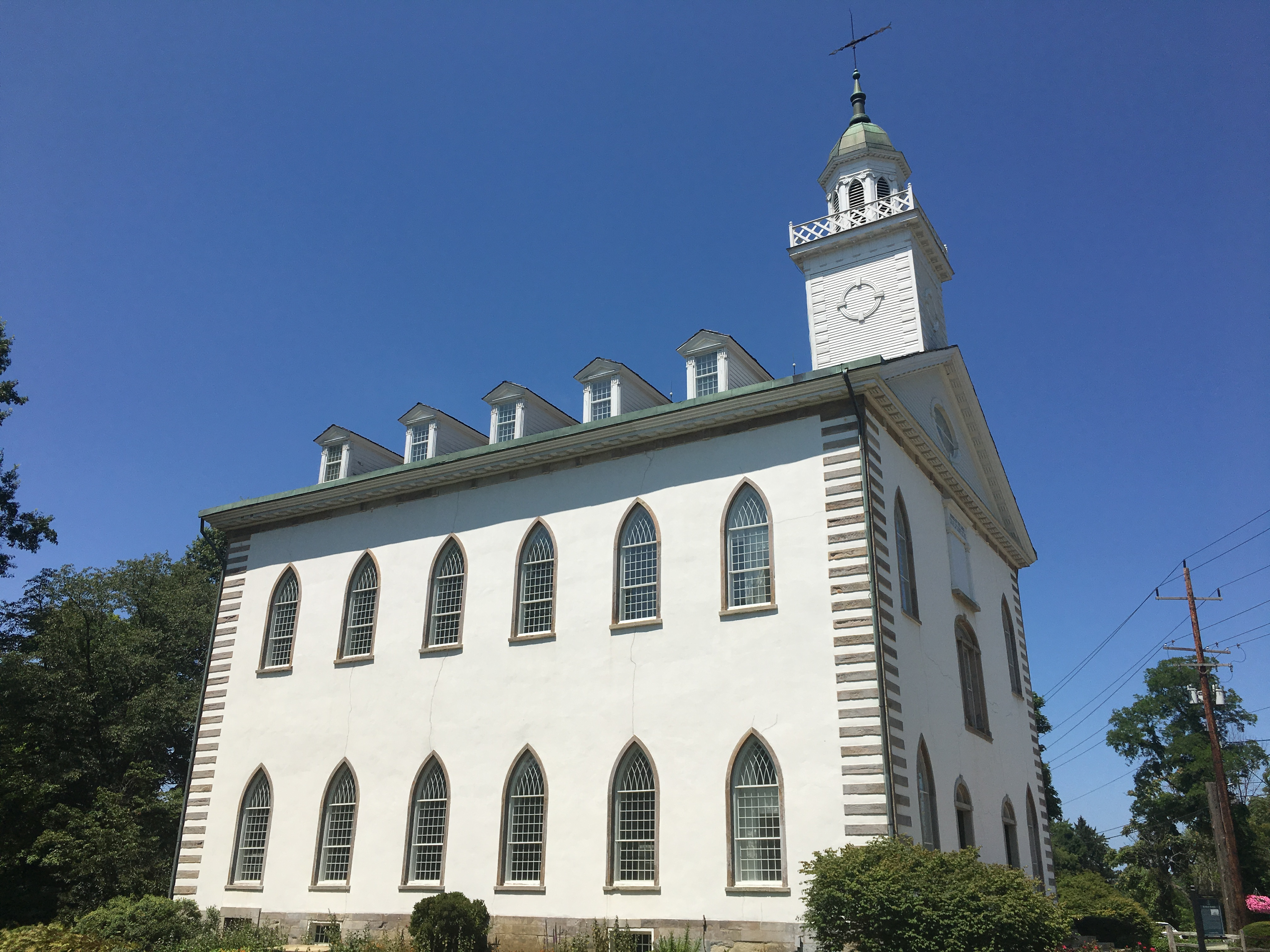
In 1836, Smith dedicated the House of the Lord in Kirtland, later known as Kirtland Temple.

After the Camp returned to Ohio, Smith drew heavily from its participants to establish various governing bodies in the church. He gave a revelation announcing that in order to redeem Zion, his followers would have to receive an endowment in the Kirtland Temple, which he and his followers constructed. In March 1836, at the temple's dedication, many who received the endowment reported seeing visions of angels and engaged in prophesying and speaking in tongues.

In 1836, Smith traveled to Salem, Massachusetts, to search for a trove of coins there. Smith announced a revelation that God had "much treasure in this city". After a month, he and his companions returned to Kirtland empty-handed.

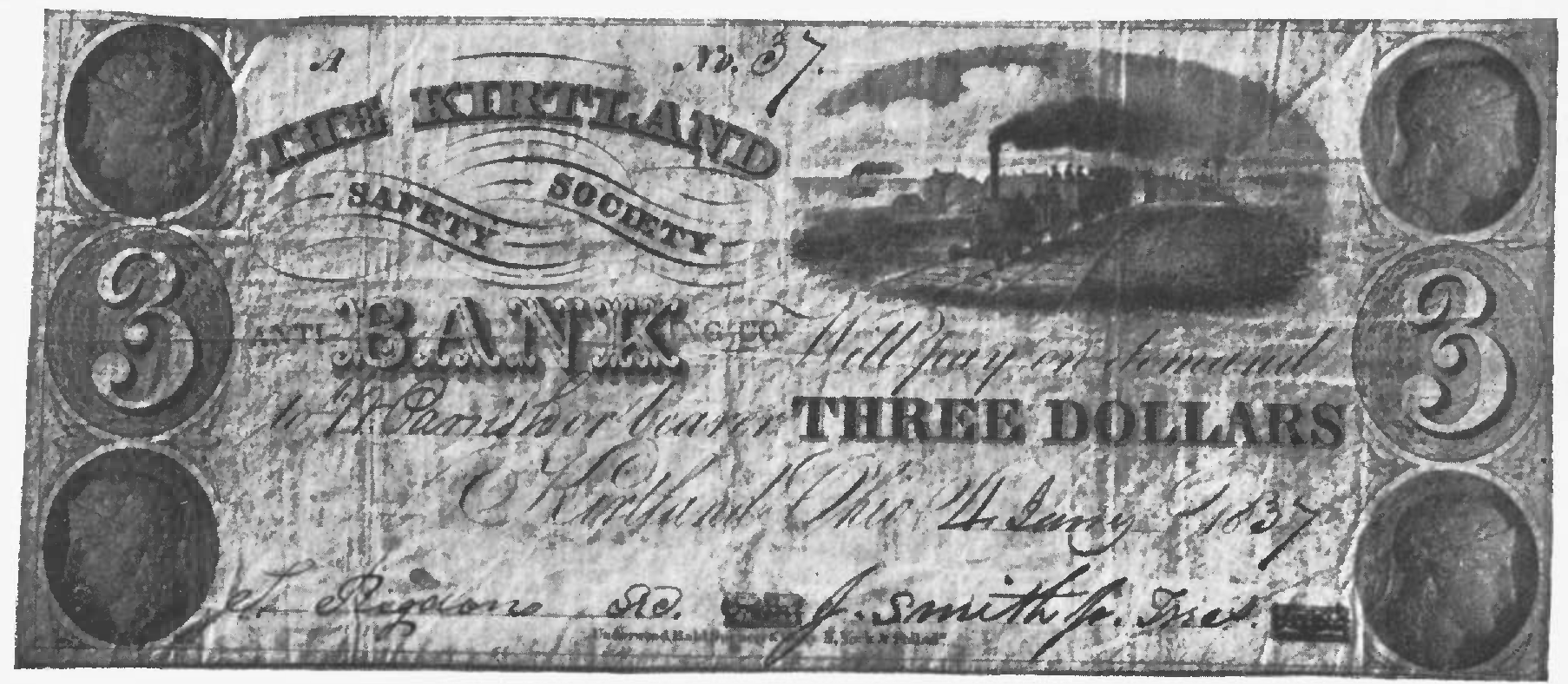
Note issued by the Kirtland Safety Society Anti-Banking Company

In 1837, a series of internal disputes led to the demise of the Kirtland community. In 1836, church apostle Orson Hyde was sent to the Ohio legislature to request a bank charter, while Oliver Cowdery went to Philadelphia and acquired plates to print notes for the proposed bank. On January 2, Hyde returned to Kirtland empty-handed, unable to persuade any legislator to sponsor a bill for a bank charter; Smith and other bank leaders proceeded with their plans, calling their organization an 'anti-banking society' and issuing bank notes. "Anti" and "ing" were engraved before and after "Bank"—in smaller typeface—on the printing plates Cowdery had previously purchased in Philadelphia. Smith encouraged his followers to buy the notes, in which he invested heavily himself. The bank failed within a month. Historian Robert Kent Fielding argues:

There was never the slightest chance that the Kirtland Safety Society anti-Bank-ing Company could succeed.... a gigantic company capitalized at four million dollars, when the entire capitalization of all the banks in the state of Ohio was only nine and one third million... Stock was to be paid in by subscription but that the amount of payments were left to the discretion of the company managers. Furthermore, total issuance of notes was not prescribed, nor was the relation of notes to capital and assets... To a banker, the articles fairly shouted: 'this is a wildcat, beware!'

As a result of the bank failure, Mormons in Kirtland suffered losses and intense pressure from debt collectors. Smith was held responsible for the failure, and there were widespread defections from the church, including many of Smith's closest advisers. Construction of the Kirtland Temple had only added to the church's debt, and Smith was hounded by creditors. Smith and Rigdon were charged with illegally operating a bank; both were found guilty and fined.

In June 1837, Smith was arrested on a charge that he had conspired to have critic Grandison Newell murdered. Solomon Denton and Orson Hyde testified for the prosecution. Smith was acquitted.

Also in 1837, Oliver Cowdery, who was then assistant president of the church, accused Smith of engaging in a sexual relationship with a teenage servant in his home, Fanny Alger. Smith, who was married to Emma at the time, said little of the relationship, but he did specifically deny being guilty of adultery. Indeed, contemporaries of Smith agree that he had likely married Alger as a polygamous wife. Cowdery was subject to excommunication proceedings for "seeking to destroy the character of President Joseph Smith, Jun., by falsely insinuating that he was guilty of adultery", but in 2014 the LDS church admitted Smith had had a marital relationship with Alger.

By 1838, Smith was facing widespread dissension from high-profile church leaders, accusing him of being a fallen prophet, as well as mounting lawsuits. That night, he and Sidney Rigdon fled Kirtland to join up with the Mormons in Far West, Missouri. Smith's critics in Kirtland took control of the temple, but many Kirtland Mormons eventually followed Smith to Missouri.

=== Strife and war in Far West, Missouri (1838–39) ===
By 1838, Smith had abandoned plans to reclaim the city of Independence and instead declared the town of Far West as the new "Zion". In Missouri, the church also took the name "Church of Jesus Christ of Latter Day Saints", and construction began on a new temple. In the weeks and months after Smith and Rigdon arrived at Far West, thousands of Latter Day Saints followed them from Kirtland. Smith encouraged the settlement of land outside Caldwell County, instituting a settlement in Adam-ondi-Ahman, in Daviess County.

Since 1830, Smith's claims about the golden plates had been corroborated by statements from the Three Witnesses: Oliver Cowdery, Martin Harris, and David Whitmer. In December 1837, Harris was excommunicated after denouncing Joseph Smith as a financial fraudster over the bank scandal, while Whitmer and Cowdery were excommunicated for dissent in April 1838. In June 1838, a secret group called the Danites was formed to deal with dissenters who had split with Smith. A letter was addressed specifically to the principal dissenters: Oliver Cowdery, David Whitmer, John Whitmer, William Wines Phelps, and Lyman E. Johnson. The letter demanded the dissenters vacate the county, warning "depart, or a more fatal calamity shall befall you." The letter — later known as the "Danite Manifesto" — displayed the signatures of eighty-three Mormons, including that of Joseph Smith's brother, and fellow member of the First Presidency, Hyrum, but not Joseph or Rigdon. The letter had the desired effect, and the few named dissenters quickly fled the county. That July, Smith wrote in his diary that the Danites were a force to "put to right that which is not right, and to clense the Church of every great evil".

Beginning in 1838, Smith told followers that, as a teen, he had been visited by "two personages" that he identified as God and Jesus. According to his 1838 account, the young Smith asked the personages which church was correct and was told that all were wrong.

Political and religious differences between old Missourians and newly arriving Latter Day Saint settlers provoked tensions between the two groups, much as they had in Jackson County. By this time, Smith's experiences with mob violence led him to believe that his faith's survival required greater militancy against anti-Mormons. Tensions between the Mormons and the native Missourians escalated quickly until, on August 6, 1838, non-Mormons in Gallatin, Missouri, tried to prevent Mormons from voting, and a brawl ensued. The election day scuffles initiated the 1838 Mormon War. Non-Mormon vigilantes raided and burned Mormon farms, while Danites and other Mormons pillaged non-Mormon towns.

In the Battle of Crooked River, a group of Mormons attacked the Missouri state militia, mistaking them for anti-Mormon vigilantes. Governor Lilburn Boggs then ordered that the Mormons be "exterminated or driven from the state". On October 30, a party of Missourians surprised and killed seventeen Mormons in the Haun's Mill massacre.

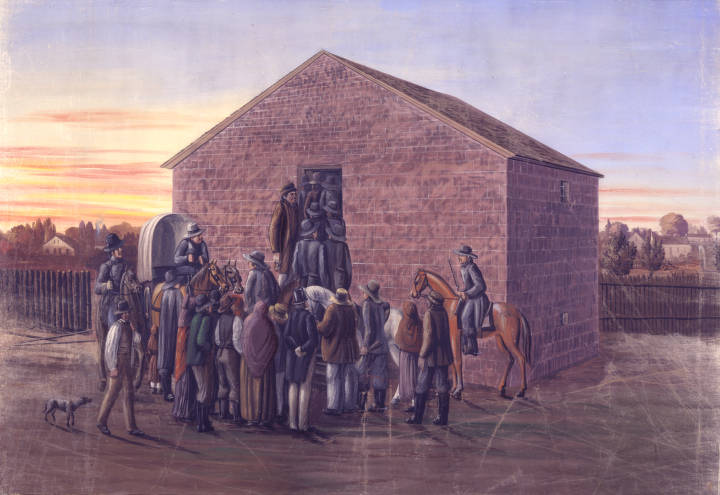
Smith was held for four months in Liberty jail.

The following day, the Mormons surrendered to 2,500 state troops and agreed to forfeit their property and leave the state. Smith was immediately brought before a military court, accused of treason, and sentenced to be executed the next morning, but Alexander Doniphan, who was Smith's former attorney and a brigadier general in the Missouri militia, refused to carry out the order. Smith was then sent to a state court for a preliminary hearing, where several of his former allies testified against him. Smith and five others, including Rigdon, were charged with treason, and transferred to the jail at Liberty, Missouri, to await trial.

During his imprisonment, Smith wrote a personal defense and an apology for the activities of his followers. Though he directed his followers to collect and publish their stories of persecution, he also urged them to moderate their antagonism toward non-Mormons. On April 6, 1839, after a grand jury hearing in Daviess County, Smith and his companions escaped custody, almost certainly with the connivance of the sheriff and guards.

=== Rule in Nauvoo, Illinois (1839–1844) ===
Many American newspapers criticized Missouri for the Haun's Mill massacre and the state's expulsion of the Mormons. Illinois then accepted Mormon refugees who gathered along the banks of the Mississippi River, where Smith purchased high-priced, swampy woodland in the hamlet of Commerce. He attempted to portray the Mormons as an oppressed minority and unsuccessfully petitioned the federal government for help in obtaining reparations.

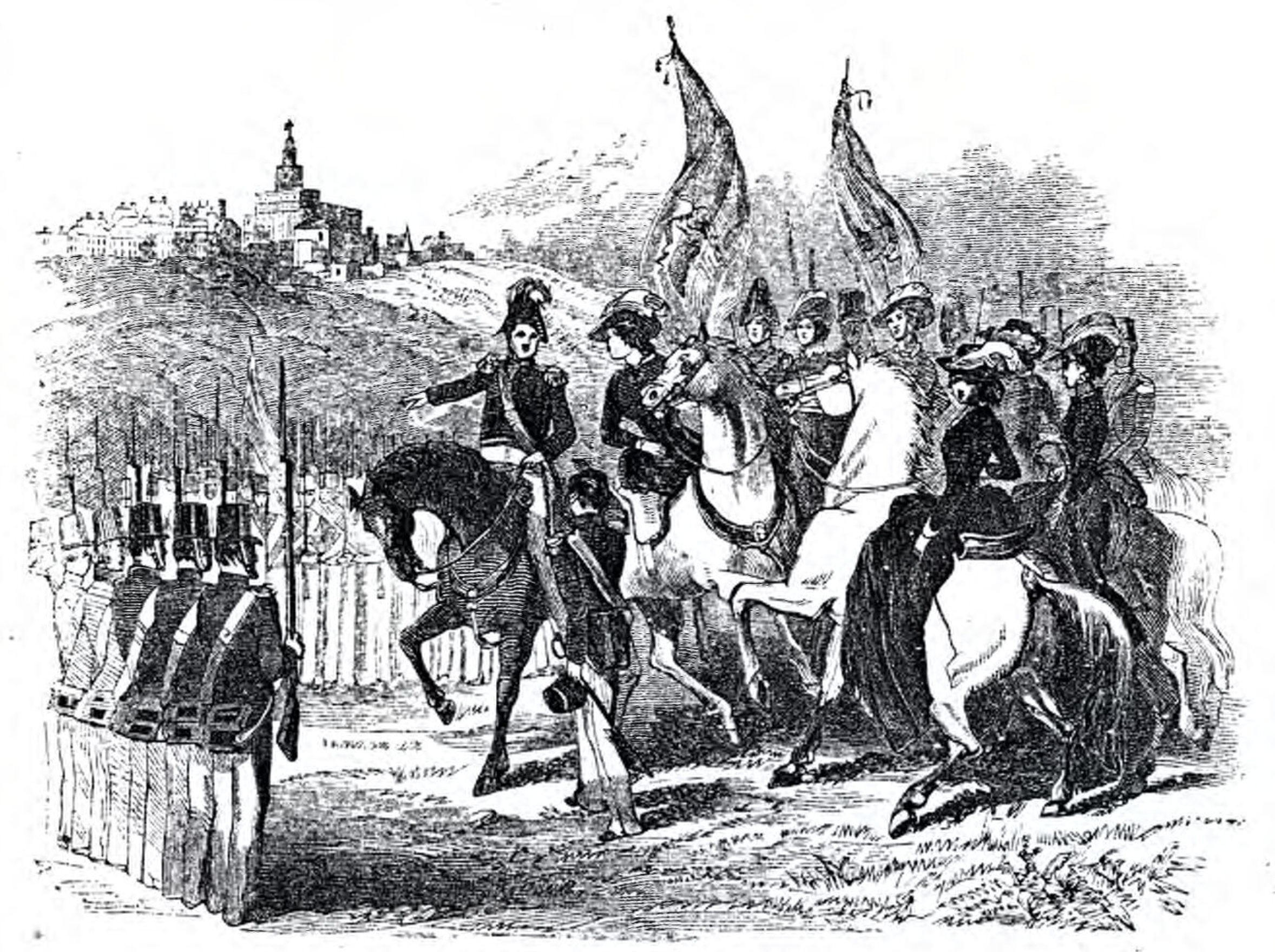
Smith inspecting the Nauvoo Legion

Smith also attracted a few wealthy and influential allies, including John C. Bennett, the Illinois quartermaster general. Bennett used his connections in the Illinois state legislature to obtain an unusually liberal charter for the new city, which Smith renamed "Nauvoo". The charter granted the city virtual autonomy, authorized a university, and granted Nauvoo habeas corpus power—which allowed Smith to fend off extradition to Missouri. Though Latter Day Saint authorities controlled Nauvoo's civil government, the city guaranteed religious freedom for its residents. The charter also authorized the Nauvoo Legion, a militia whose actions were limited only by state and federal constitutions. Bennett and Smith became its commanders, and were styled Major General and Lieutenant General respectively. As such, they controlled by far the largest body of armed men in Illinois. Smith appointed Bennett as Assistant President of the Church, and Bennett was elected Nauvoo's first mayor.

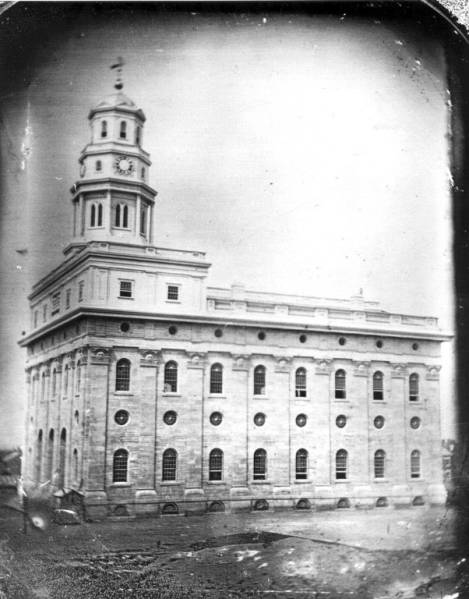
Smith planned the construction of the Nauvoo Temple, which was completed after his death.

The early Nauvoo years were a period of doctrinal innovation. Smith introduced baptism for the dead in 1840, and in 1841 construction began on the Nauvoo Temple as a place for recovering lost ancient knowledge. An 1841 revelation promised the restoration of the "fullness of the priesthood"; and in May 1842, Smith inaugurated a revised endowment or "first anointing". The endowment resembled the rites of Freemasonry that Smith had observed two months earlier when he had been initiated "at sight" into the Nauvoo Masonic lodge. At first, the endowment was open only to men, who were initiated into a special group called the Anointed Quorum. For women, Smith introduced the Relief Society, a service club and sorority within which Smith predicted women would receive "the keys of the kingdom". Smith also elaborated on his plan for a Millennial kingdom; no longer envisioning the building of Zion in Nauvoo, he viewed Zion as encompassing all of North and South America, with Mormon settlements being "stakes" of Zion's metaphorical tent. Zion also became less a refuge from an impending tribulation than a great building project. In the summer of 1842, Smith revealed a plan to establish the millennial Kingdom of God, which would eventually establish theocratic rule over the whole Earth.

In Nauvoo, Smith secretly practiced plural marriage. He introduced the doctrine to a few of his closest associates, including Bennett. When rumors of polygamy (called "spiritual wifery" by Bennett) got abroad, Smith forced Bennett's resignation as Nauvoo mayor. In retaliation, Bennett left Nauvoo and began publishing sensational accusations against Smith and his followers.

By mid-1842, popular opinion in Illinois had turned against the Mormons. After an unknown assailant shot and wounded former Missouri governor Lilburn Boggs in May 1842, anti-Mormons circulated rumors that Smith's bodyguard, Porter Rockwell, was the gunman. In July, the recently excommunicated John C. Bennett published a letter claiming Smith had admitted sending Rockwell to 'fulfill prophecy' by killing Boggs; Bennett's claims were widely viewed as an attempt at vengeance for his recent excommunication, with even Gov. Ford later writing that Bennett "everywhere accounted the same debauched, unprincipled and profligate character". Though the evidence was circumstantial, the new governor of Missouri petitioned Illinois for Smith's extradition, and Illinois Governor Carlin issued an arrest warrant. Certain he would be killed if he ever returned to Missouri, Smith went into hiding twice during the next five months, until the U.S. Attorney for Illinois argued that his extradition would be unconstitutional. Rockwell was later freed after a Missouri grand jury declined to indict him for the shooting.

In May 1843, Smith married Helen Mar Kimball, age 14, the daughter of apostle Heber C. Kimball, who himself had two wives at that time and had encouraged his daughter to accept the marriage.

In June 1843, Illinois Governor Thomas Ford issued a warrant to extradite Smith to Missouri on the outstanding charge of treason. Two law officers arrested Smith but were intercepted by a party of Mormons before they could reach Missouri. Smith was then released on a writ of habeas corpus from the Nauvoo municipal court. The events caused significant political fallout in Illinois.

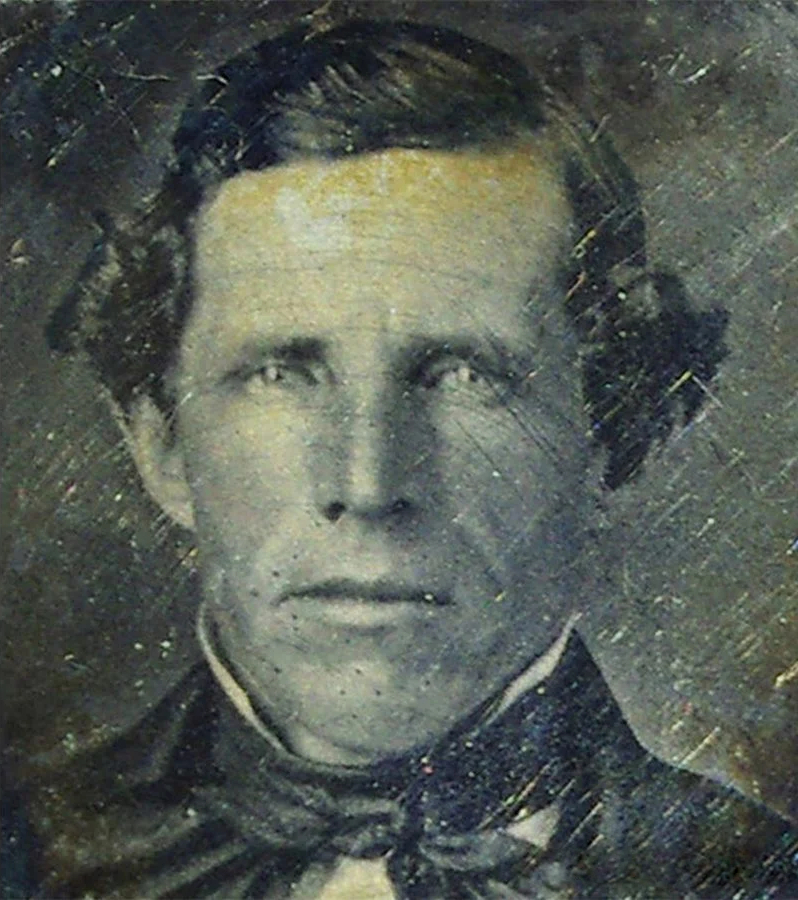
According to researchers Ronald Romig and Lachlan Mackay, Smith posed for a daguerreotype by Lucian R. Foster sometime in 1844; the photograph was published in 2022 in the John Whitmer Historical Association Journal.

On July 12, 1843, Joseph Smith dictated a revelation about polygamy; Hyrum read the revelation to the High Council on August 12, dividing the hierarchy into polygamist and anti-polygamist factions. On August 1, Smith assaulted County assessor Walter Bagby; Smith pleaded guilty, a fine was imposed, and it was paid. In September, Smith was charged with assault and battery against a Warsaw resident by the name of Bennett [not John C. Bennett]; arriving in Nauvoo with a warrant for Smith's arrest, Constable James Charles was informed that Smith had been tried and acquitted by the Nauvoo municipal court.

On November 5, Smith became ill and suspected he had been poisoned, perhaps by wife Emma. In December 1843, Smith petitioned Congress to make Nauvoo an independent territory with the right to call out federal troops in its defense. Smith then wrote to the leading presidential candidates, asking what they would do to protect the Mormons. After receiving noncommittal or negative responses, he announced his own independent candidacy for president of the United States, suspended regular proselytizing, and sent out the Quorum of the Twelve and hundreds of other political missionaries. Smith launched a presidential campaign in 1844 on a platform which proposed gradually ending slavery, protecting the liberties of Latter Day Saints and other minorities, reducing the size of Congress, reestablishing a national bank, reforming prisons, and annexing Texas, California, and Oregon.

=== Arrest and death at hands of a mob ===
By early 1844, a rift developed between Smith and a half dozen of his closest associates. Robert D. Foster, a physician and general in the Nauvoo Legion, returned home to find Smith with his wife Sarah; She later confessed that Smith had preached polygamy and attempted to seduce her. After Joseph Smith made similar proposals to William Law's wife Jane, Law threatened to expose Smith unless he went before the High Council to confess and repent. On January 8, 1844, Smith removed Law from the First Presidency.

In March 1844, Smith secretly organized the Council of Fifty and tasked it with deciding which national or state laws Mormons should obey, establishing its own government, and finding a site where Mormons could live under theocratic law beyond the control of other governments—perhaps in Texas, Oregon, or Mexican-controlled California. On March 9, Smith preached a sermon on the plurality of gods—a doctrine the dissenters regarded as polytheistic blasphemy. On April 18, the Council unanimously elected Smith as "Prophet, Priest, and King".

"What a thing it is for a man to be accused of committing adultery, and having seven wives, when I can only find one. I am the same man, and as innocent as I was fourteen years ago; and I can prove them all perjurers."

— Joseph Smith
May 26, 1844.

Also on April 18, Smith excommunicated the dissenters from the church, alleging they were plotting to kill him. In response, Law and others formed the True Church of Jesus Christ of Latter Day Saints, which taught Smith was once a true prophet but had since fallen into sin. On May 23, Law and Foster testified before the grand jury in Carthage, which issued indictments against Smith for "adultery, fornication, and perjury". On May 26, Smith responded with another public denial.

On June 7, the dissidents published the first issue of the Nauvoo Expositor, a four-page tract which "exposed" Smith's secret practice of polygamy and his intention to establish a theocracy. The paper similarly decried Smith's recent doctrines of many Gods". Arguing the Expositor would provoke a new round of violence against the Mormons, the Nauvoo City Council declared the newspaper a public nuisance, and Smith ordered the Nauvoo Legion to assist the police force in destroying its printing press. During the council debate, Smith vigorously urged the council to order the press destroyed, not realizing that destroying a newspaper was more likely to incite an attack than any of the newspaper's accusations. On June 11, a warrant was issued for Smith's arrest on the charge of inciting a riot resulting in the destruction of the Expositor. Destruction of the newspaper provoked a strident call to arms from Thomas C. Sharp, editor of the Warsaw Signal and longtime critic of Smith.

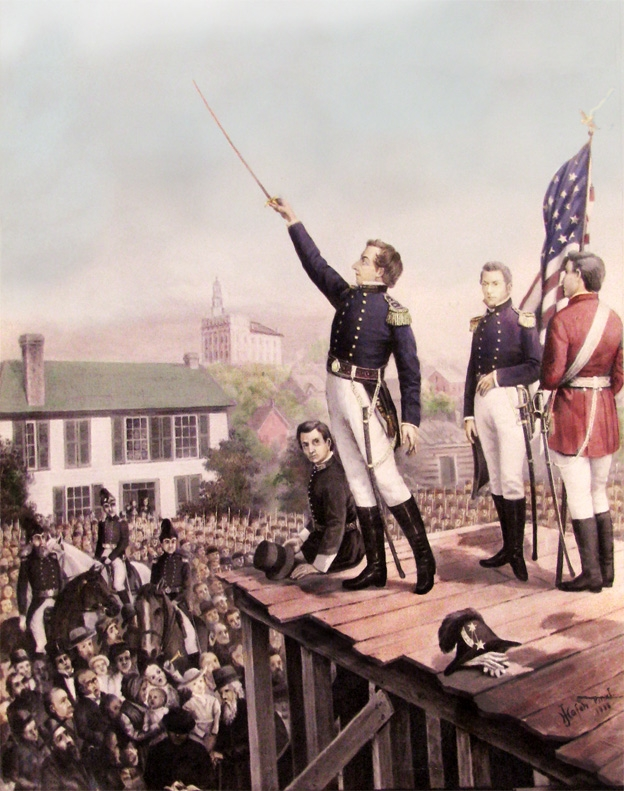
Lt. General Joseph Smith's last public address was on June 18, to the Nauvoo Legion.

On June 12, Constable David Bettisworth arrived in Nauvoo to place Joseph Smith under arrest and convey him to Carthage, but Smith was again freed by the municipal court. Bettisworth left but promised to return. Fearing further arrest attempts and mob violence, Smith mobilized the Nauvoo Legion on June 18 and declared martial law.

Officials in Carthage responded by mobilizing a small detachment of the state militia, and Governor Ford intervened, threatening to raise a larger militia unless Smith and the Nauvoo City Council surrendered themselves. Smith initially fled across the Mississippi River to avoid arrest, but shortly returned and surrendered to Ford after he was given assurances of his safety. On June 25, Smith and his brother Hyrum arrived in Carthage to stand trial for inciting a riot. Once the Smiths were in custody, the charges were increased to treason, preventing them from posting bail. John Taylor, Willard Richards, Dan Jones, John S. Fullmer, and Stephen Markham voluntarily joined the Smiths in the Carthage Jail. John S. Fullmer and Cyrus H. Wheelock visited the prisoners in jail, smuggling two pistols to Joseph in the process.

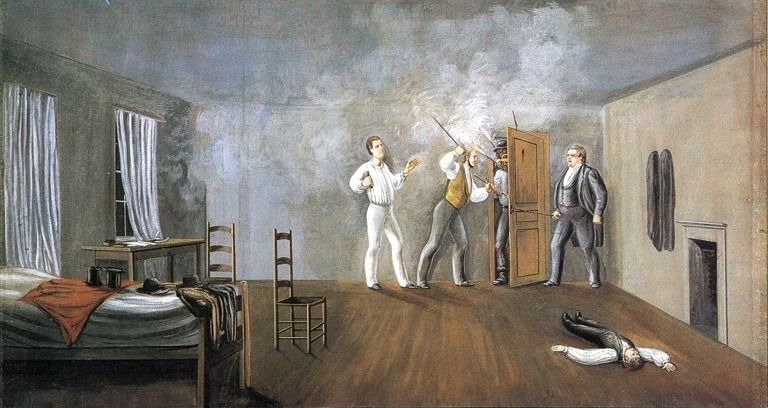
A 19th-century painting depicting the mob attack inside Carthage Jail

On June 27, 1844, Smith and the other prisoners were staying in the jailer's bedroom, which did not have bars on the windows. Although Smith both faced death threats and had a history of successful jailbreak, he and the other prisoners were left guarded by only six men. Upon learning that Smith was relatively unguarded, an armed mob with blackened faces stormed the jail. Smith, mistaking the mob for the Nauvoo Legion, initially told a jailer: "Don't trouble yourself ... they've come to rescue me." The guards reportedly feigned defense of the jail by firing shots or blanks over the attackers' heads, and some of the Greys even reportedly joined the mob, who rushed up the stairs. The mob first attempted to push the door open to fire into the room, though Smith and the other prisoners pushed back and prevented this.

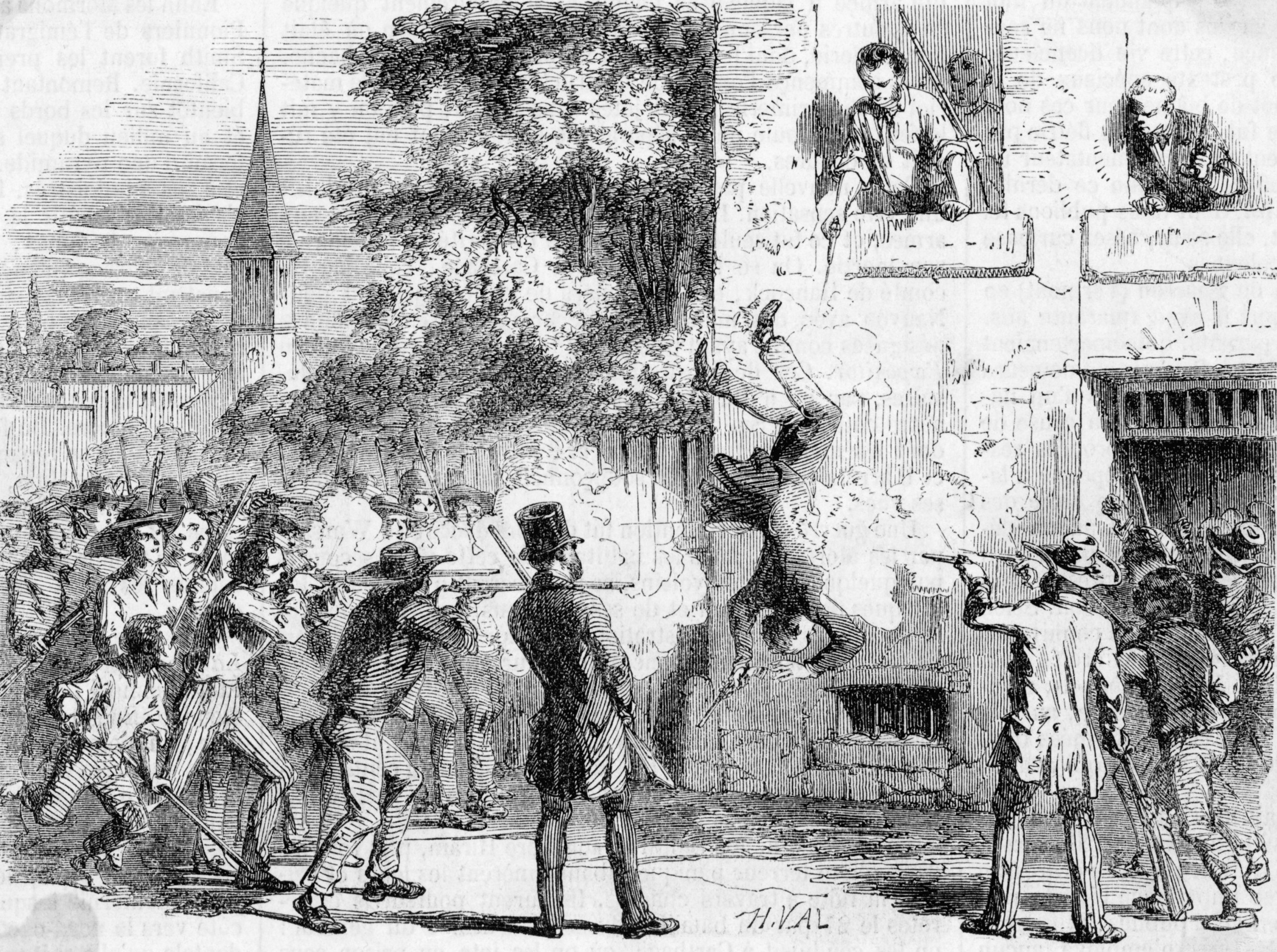
Smith was shot multiple times before and after falling from the window.

Hyrum, who was trying to secure the door, was killed instantly with a shot to the face. Smith fired three shots from the smuggled pepper-box pistol, wounding three men, before he sprang for the window. He was shot multiple times before falling out of the window, crying, "Oh Lord my God!" He died shortly after hitting the ground, but was shot several more times by an improvised firing squad before the mob dispersed. Smith was the first U.S. presidential candidate to be assassinated.

=== Immediate aftermath and burial ===
Immediately following Smith's death, non-Mormon newspapers were nearly unanimous in portraying Smith as a religious fanatic. Conversely, within the Latter Day Saint community, Smith was viewed as a martyred prophet.

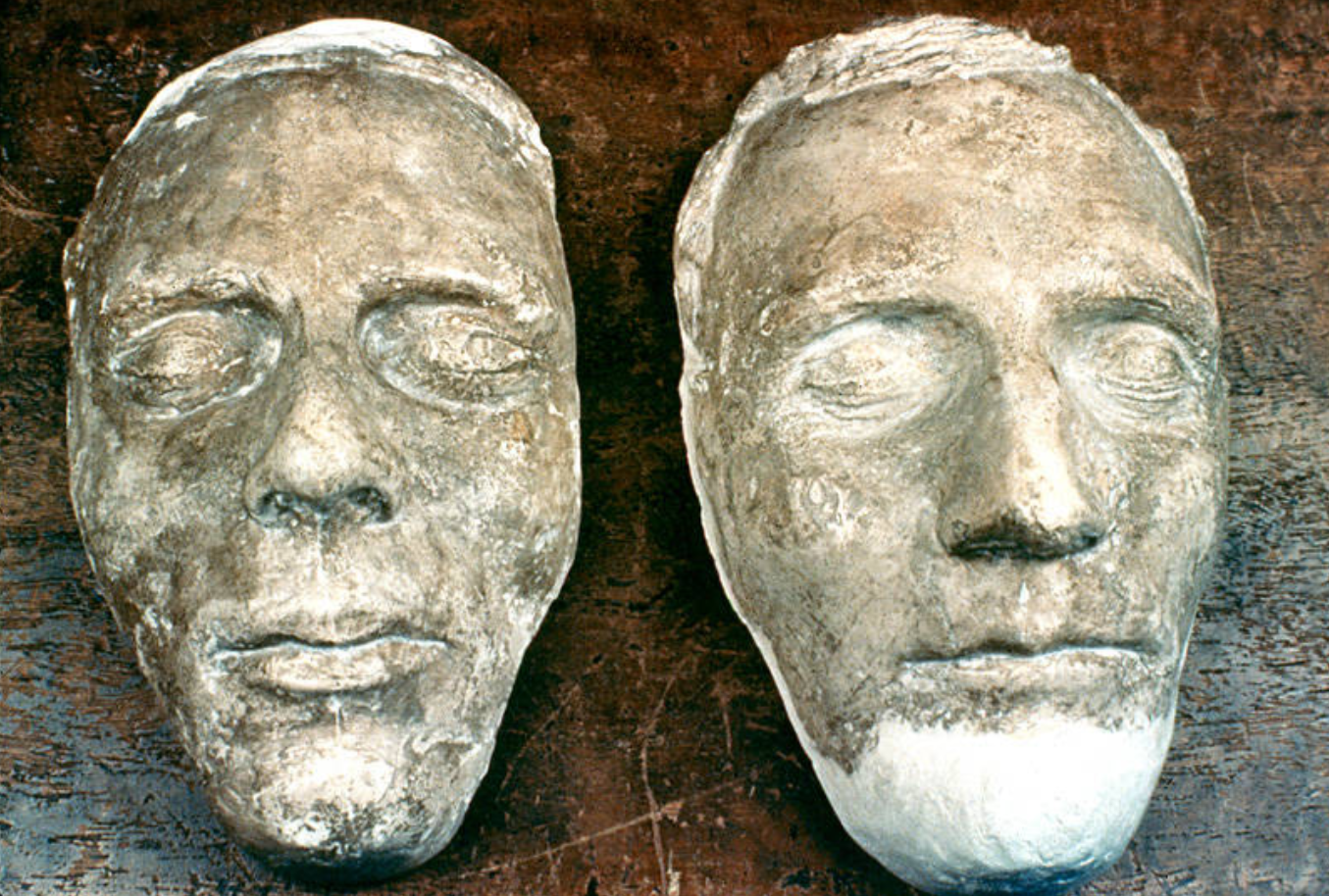
The death masks of Joseph Smith (left) and Hyrum Smith (right)

After a public funeral and viewing of the deceased brothers, Smith's widow—who feared hostile non-Mormons might try to desecrate the bodies—had their remains buried at night in a secret location, with substitute coffins filled with sandbags interred in the publicly attested grave. The bodies were later moved and reburied under an outbuilding on the Smith property off the Mississippi River. Members of the Reorganized Church of Jesus Christ of Latter Day Saints (RLDS Church), under the direction of then-RLDS Church president Frederick M. Smith (Smith's grandson), searched for, located, and disinterred the Smith brothers' remains in 1928 and reinterred them, along with Smith's wife, in Nauvoo at the Smith Family Cemetery.

== Legacy ==
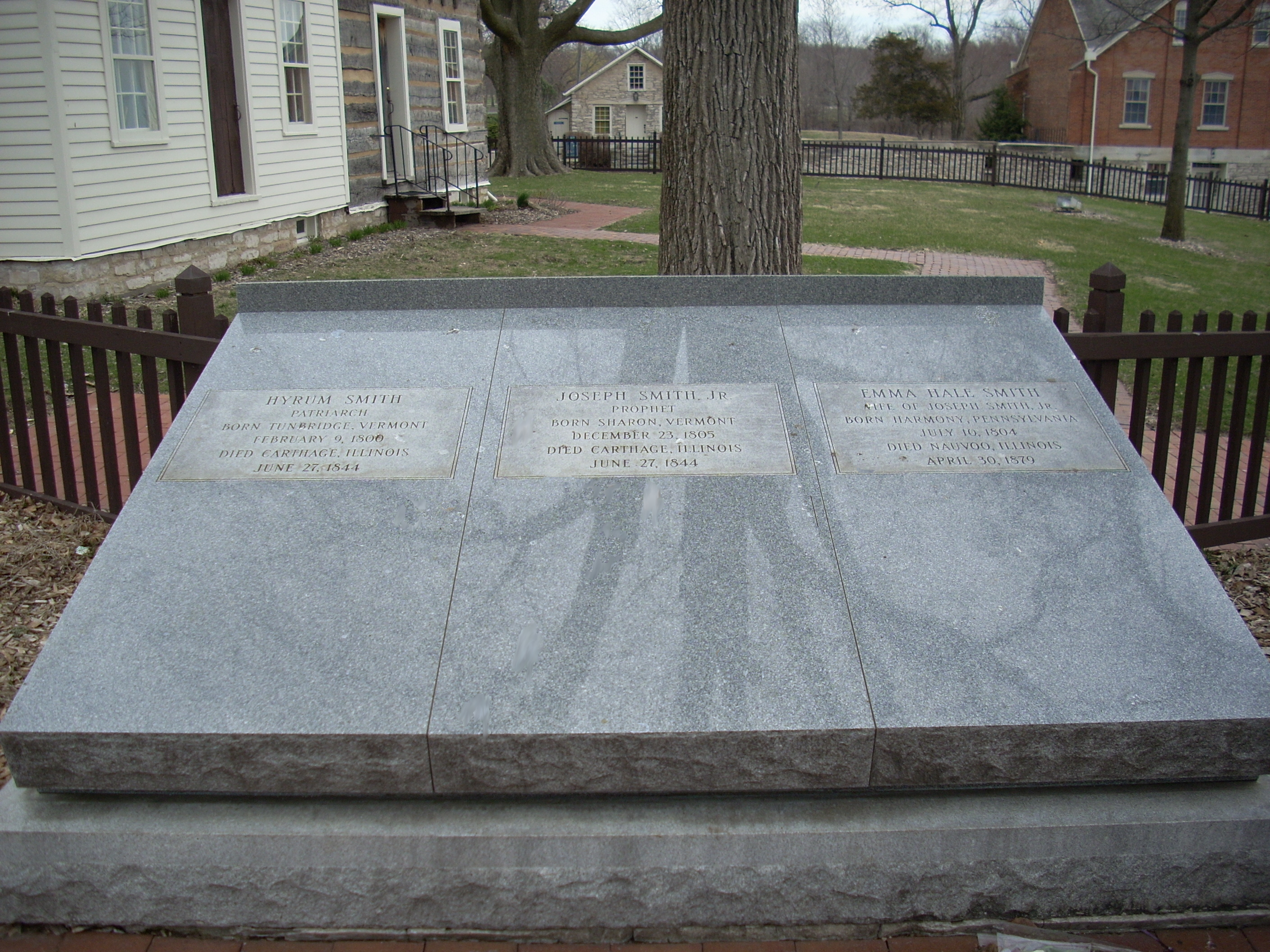
Gravesite of Joseph, Emma, and Hyrum Smith, in Nauvoo, Illinois

Modern biographers and scholars agree that Smith was one of the most influential, charismatic, and innovative figures in American religious history. In a 2015 compilation of the 100 Most Significant Americans of All Time, Smithsonian ranked Smith first in the category of religious figures. In popular opinion, non-Mormons in the U.S. generally consider Smith a "charlatan, scoundrel, and heretic", while outside the U.S. he is "obscure".

Within the Latter Day Saint movement, Smith's legacy varies between denominations: The Church of Jesus Christ of Latter-day Saints (LDS Church) and its members consider Smith the founding prophet of their church, on par with Moses and Elijah. Meanwhile, Smith's reputation is ambivalent in the Community of Christ, which continues "honoring his role" in the church's founding history but deemphasizes his human leadership. Conversely, Woolleyite Mormon fundamentalism has deified Smith within a cosmology of many gods.

Buildings named in honor of Smith

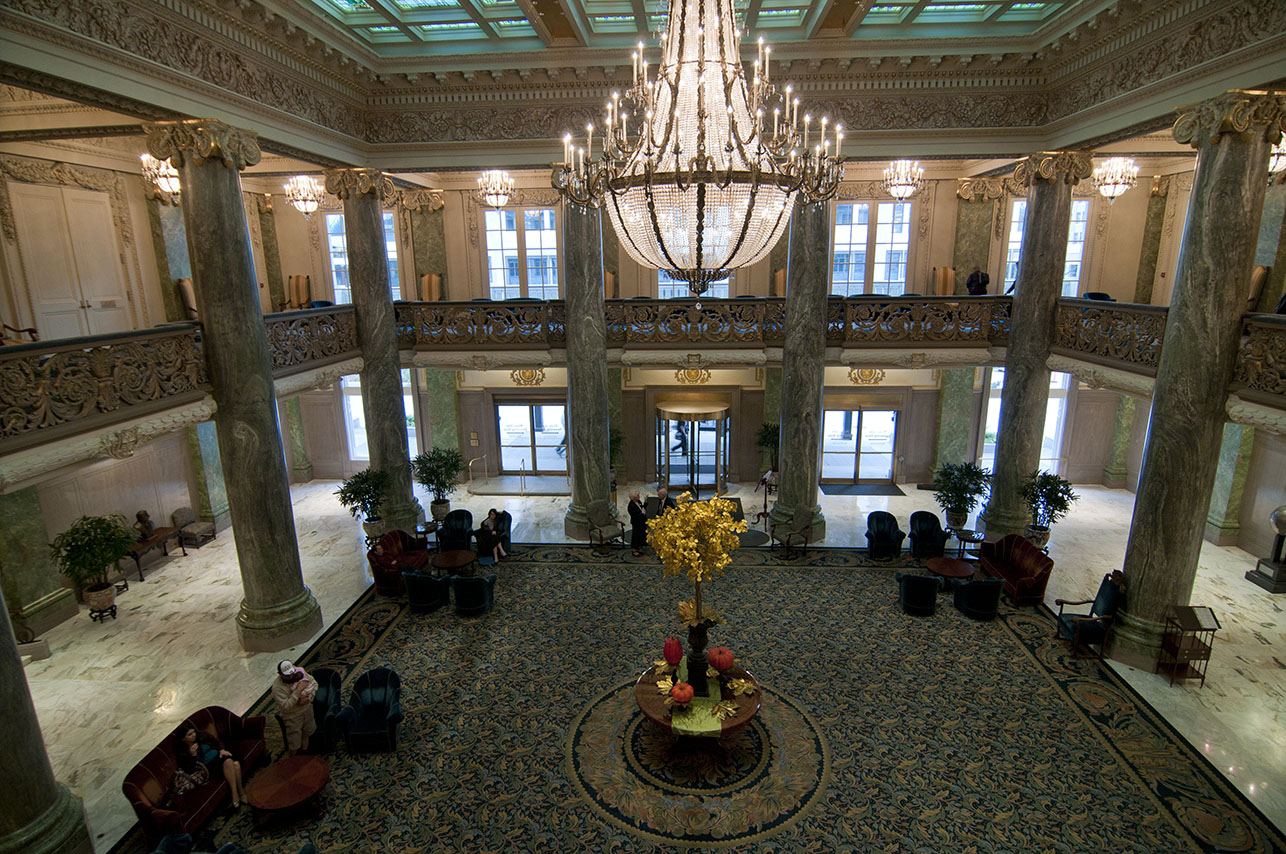
The Joseph Smith Memorial Building in Salt Lake City

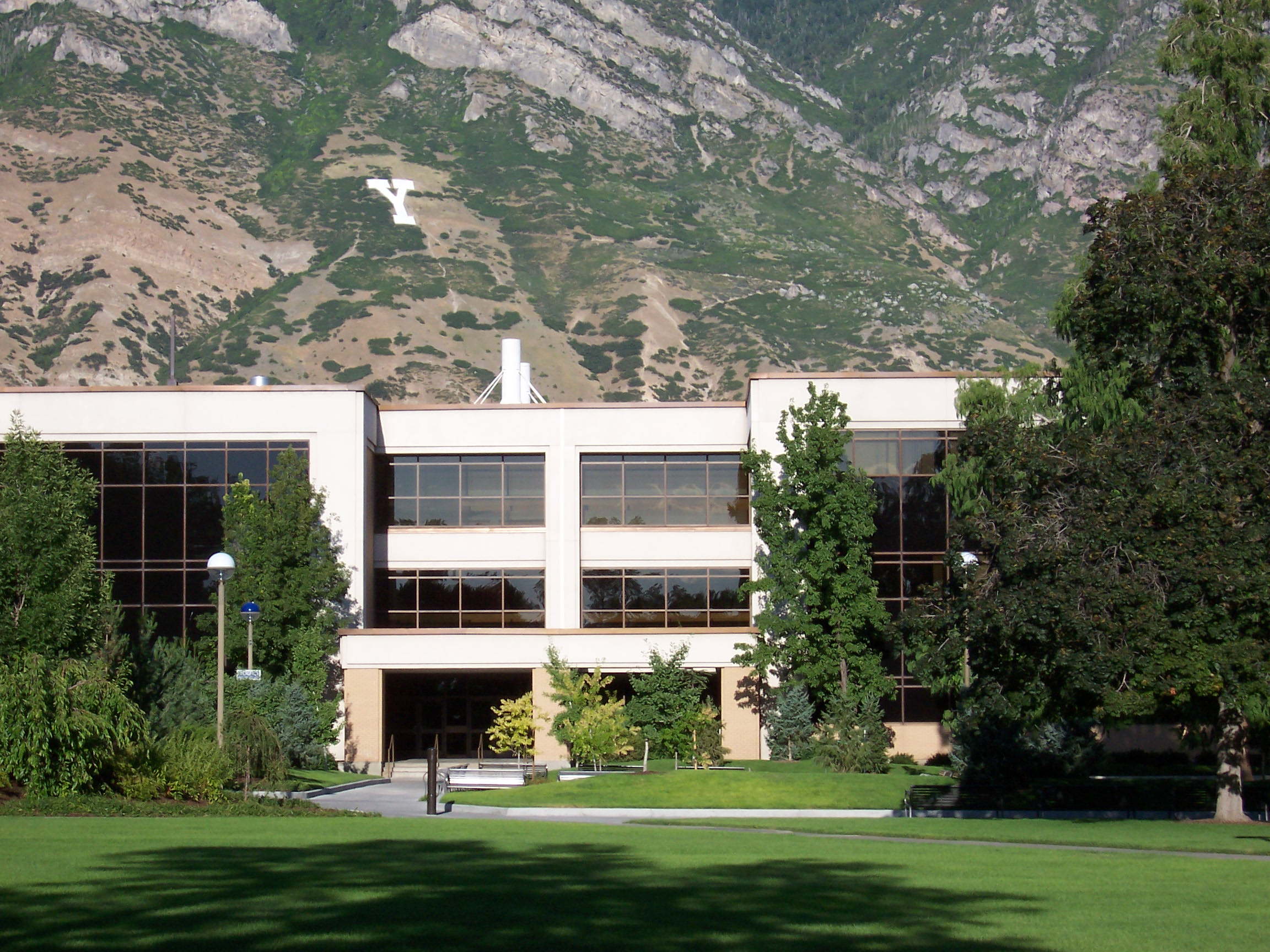
The Joseph Smith Building on the campus of Brigham Young University

Memorials to Smith include the Joseph Smith Memorial Building in Salt Lake City the former Joseph Smith Memorial building on the campus of Brigham Young University as well as the Joseph Smith Building there, a granite obelisk marking Smith's birthplace, and a fifteen-foot-tall bronze statue of Smith in the World Peace Dome in Pune, India.

=== Succession crisis and split into denominations ===
Smith's death resulted in a succession crisis within the Latter Day Saint movement. He had proposed several ways to choose his successor, but never clarified his preference. The two strongest succession candidates were Young, senior member and president of the Quorum of the Twelve Apostles, and Rigdon, the senior remaining member of the First Presidency. In a church-wide conference on August 8, most of the Latter Day Saints present elected Young. They eventually left Nauvoo and settled the Salt Lake Valley, Utah Territory.

Nominal membership in Young's denomination, which became the LDS Church, surpassed 17 million in 2023. Smaller groups followed Rigdon and James J. Strang, who had based his claim on a letter of appointment ostensibly written by Smith but which some scholars believe was forged. Some hundreds followed Lyman Wight to establish a community in Texas. Others followed Alpheus Cutler. Many members of these smaller groups, including most of Smith's family, eventually coalesced in 1860 under the leadership of Joseph Smith III and formed the RLDS Church (now called the Community of Christ), which has about 250,000 members.

=== Family and descendants ===
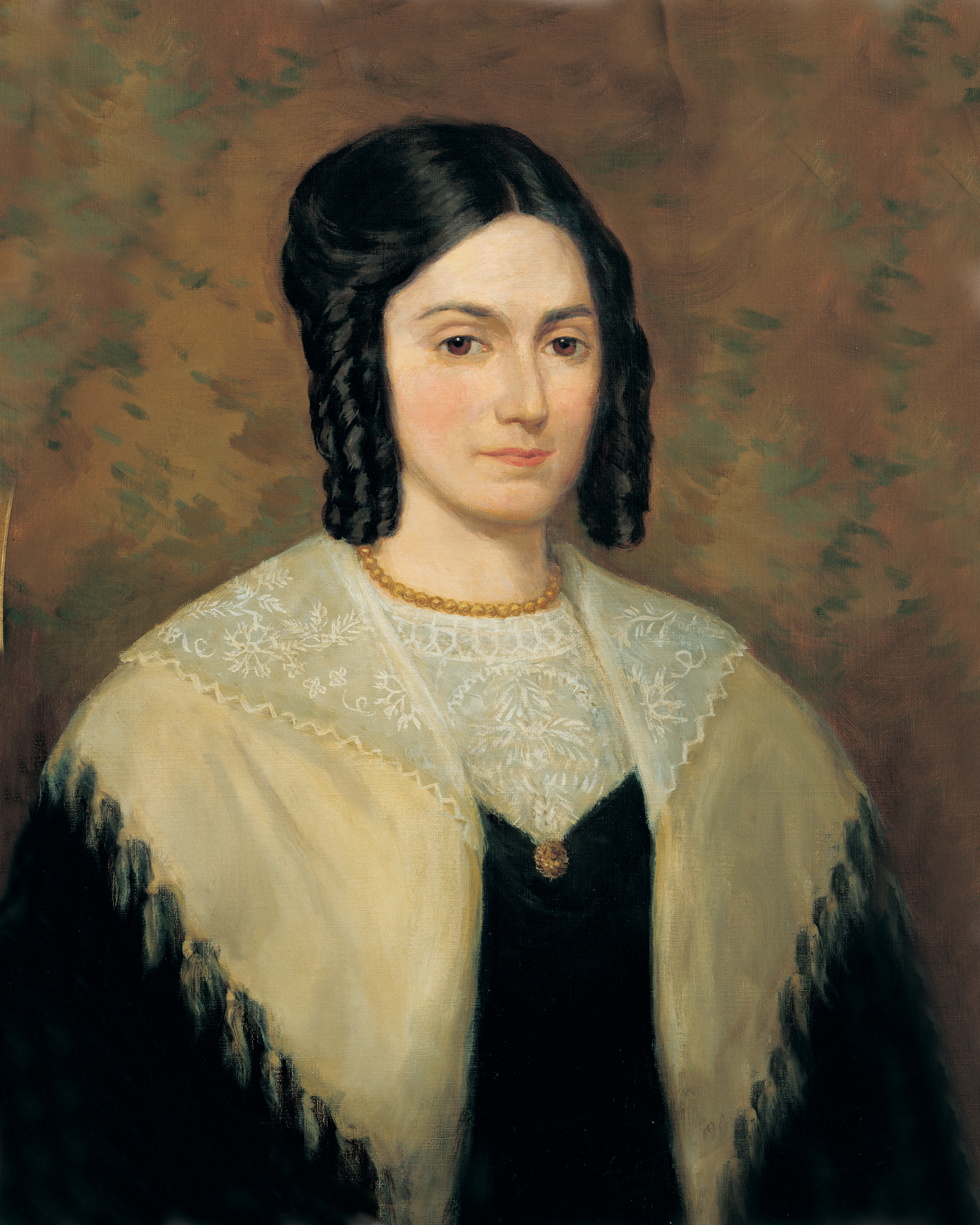
Emma Hale Smith, who married Joseph Smith in 1827.

The first of Smith's wives, Emma Hale, gave birth to nine children during their marriage, five of whom died before the age of two. The eldest, Alvin (born in 1828), died within hours of birth, as did twins Thaddeus and Louisa (born in 1831). When the twins died, the Smiths adopted another set of twins, Julia and Joseph Murdock, whose mother had recently died in childbirth; the adopted male twin died of measles in 1832. In 1841, Don Carlos, who had been born a year earlier, died of malaria, and five months later, in 1842, Emma gave birth to a stillborn son.

Joseph and Emma had five children who lived to maturity: adopted Julia Murdock, Joseph Smith III, David Hyrum Smith, Frederick Granger Williams Smith, and Alexander Hale Smith. Some historians have speculated—based on journal entries and family stories—that Smith fathered children with his plural wives. However, in cases where DNA testing of potential Smith descendants from plural wives has been possible, results have been negative. (Note: Perego's summary of alleged children of Smith by polygamous wives lists fourteen. His chapter discusses six cases of DNA analysis in detail. Successful analyses disconfirmed paternity for Smith. However, Perego notes that for other alleged cases, issues such as insufficient data and "genealogical noise" make confident conclusions impossible. For more on DNA research and Smith's alleged paternity of children of women other than Emma Smith, also see: "Research focuses on Smith family". Deseret News. May 28, 2005. Archived from the original on June 30, 2006.; "DNA tests rule out 2 as Smith descendants: Scientific advances prove no genetic link". Deseret News. November 10, 2007. Archived from the original on November 13, 2007.; Perego, Ugo A.; Myers, Natalie M.; Woodward, Scott R. (Summer 2005). "Reconstructing the Y-Chromosome of Joseph Smith, Jr.: Genealogical Applications" (PDF). Journal of Mormon History. 32 (2). Archived from the original (PDF) on July 25, 2006.)

After Smith's death, Emma was quickly alienated from Young and the LDS leadership. Emma feared and despised Young, who in turn was suspicious of Emma's desire to preserve the family's assets from inclusion with those of the church. He also disliked her open opposition to plural marriage. Young excluded Emma from ecclesiastical meetings and from social gatherings. When most Mormons moved west, Emma stayed in Nauvoo and married a non-Mormon, Major Lewis C. Bidamon. She withdrew from religion until 1860, when she affiliated with the RLDS Church headed by her son, Joseph III. Emma maintained her belief that Smith had been a prophet, and she never repudiated her belief in the authenticity of the Book of Mormon.

=== Polygamous wives ===
Smith reportedly began teaching a polygamy doctrine as early as 1831. Although the church had publicly repudiated polygamy, in 1837 there was a rift between Smith and Cowdery over the issue. Cowdery suspected Smith had engaged in a relationship with teenager Fanny Alger, who worked in the Smith household as a serving girl. Smith insisted that he had never committed adultery, "presumably", historian Bushman argues, "because he had married Alger" as a plural wife.

In April 1841, Smith secretly wed Louisa Beaman, and during the next two-and-a-half years he secretly married or was sealed to about thirty or forty additional women. Ten of his plural wives were between the ages of fourteen and twenty; others were over fifty. Ten were already married to other men, though some of these polyandrous marriages were contracted with the consent of the first husbands. Evidence for whether and to what degree Smith's polygamous marriages involved sex is ambiguous and varies between marriages. Some polygamous marriages may have been considered solely religious marriages that would not take effect until after death. In any case, during Smith's lifetime, the practice of polygamy was kept secret from both non-Mormons and most members of the church. Polygamy caused a breach between Smith and his first wife, Emma; historian Laurel Thatcher Ulrich summarizes by stating that "Emma vacillated in her support for plural marriage, sometimes acquiescing to Joseph's sealings, sometimes resisting".

== Views and teachings ==
Smith's teachings were rooted in dispensational restorationism. He taught that the true Church of Christ had been lost in the Great Apostasy but was restored by the Book of Mormon. Smith promoted the Jewish Indian theory that some Native Americans are descendants of the ancient Israelites.

=== Foundational teachings ===
==== Nighttime visit by treasure guardian (1823) ====
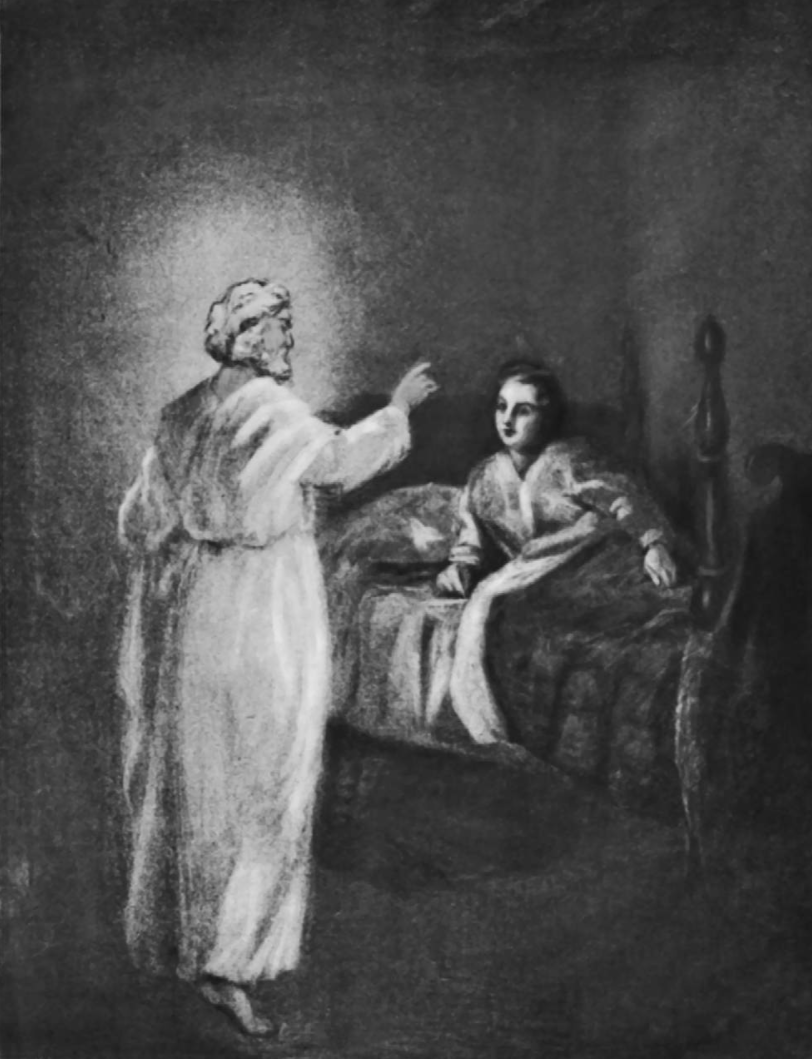
The nighttime visitation as depicted in an illustration dating to 1912.

Joseph Smith taught that he had been visited in the night by a being who revealed the location of a nearby treasure.

Early accounts mention the possibility that the encounter took place in a dream. In 1829, a local newspaper account claimed Smith "had been visited in a dream by the spirit of the Almighty" and was "thrice thus visited". In an 1832 account, Smith similarly taught that "being exceedingly frightened, I supposed it had been a dream of vision, but when I considered, I knew that it was not." In a January 1835 account, Smith described lying awake in bed when the visitation by an unnamed angel occurred. According to this account, he "saw in the vision the place where [the plates of gold] were deposited."

Early accounts describe the visitor as a 'spirit' or a 'ghost', while later accounts mention a deceased man who had become an angel. D. Michael Quinn writes "It was not customary to use 'angel' to describe a personage who had been mortal, had died, and was returning to earth to give a message to someone. An 1830 article argued that that Smith "made a league with the spirit, who afterwards turned out to be an angel". Vogel concludes "The word 'angel' is anachronstic to the 1823 setting".

By the mid-1830s, the being was described by the name Moroni, while later accounts mentioned the name Nephi. A hostile account published in 1834 identified the guardian as an old man named "Moroni". In the 1835 printing of a revelation reportedly given in September 1830, the being who visited Smith was identified as Moroni, the figure from the Book of Mormon. In Smith's 1838 account, he described Nephi (not Moroni), an "angel of light" who "had on a loose robe of most exquisite whiteness. It was a whiteness beyond anything earthly I had ever seen ... His hands were naked and his arms also a little above the wrists .... Not only was his robe exceedingly white but his whole person was glorious beyond description". Many of Smith's followers taught that Smith had encountered both Moroni and Nephi, but in the 1870s, decades after his death, Smith's followers concluded the name "Nephi" had been an error; Subsequent printings changed "Nephi" to "Moroni".

==== Failed treasure retrievals (1823–1826) ====
Earliest accounts describe Smith's failed attempt to recover the treasure through the lens of folk magic. Willard Chase, a treasure-digging neighbor, recalled Joseph Sr telling him in 1827 about an attempt to recover the treasure years prior, where Joseph Jr. dressed in black clothes on a black horse had briefly obtained the treasure, only to lose it for failing to follow instructions.

Chase recalled that "he laid it down to place the top stone, as he found it; and turning round, to his surprise there was no book in sight." Knight similarly recalled that Smith set the plates down, only to find they had disappeared.

Chase recalled hearing that the guardian was a "spirit" who looked "something like a toad, which soon assumed the appearance of a man" and struck Joseph thrice. Benjamin Saunders likewise recalled a tale of "something down near the box that looked some [thing] like a toad that rose up into a man which forbid him to take the plates."

According to Chase's tale, the guardian instructed him to return the following year with his brother Alvin.

According to Smith's 1838 account, Smith "made an attempt to take them out, but was forbidden by the messenger, and was again informed that the time for bringing them forth had not yet arrived, neither would it, until four years from that time; but he told me that I should come to that place precisely in one year from that time, and that he would there meet with me, and that I should continue to do so until the time should come for obtaining the plates. Accordingly, as I had been commanded, I went at the end of each year, and at each time I found the same messenger there, and received instruction and intelligence from him at each of our interviews, respecting what the Lord was going to do, and how and in what manner his kingdom was to be conducted in the last days."

In the 1980s, the forged Salamander Letter by Mark Hofmann purported to be an account by Martin Harris describing a failed recovery; The letter was completely discredited along with Hofmann's other forgeries.

==== Treasures obtained (1827) ====
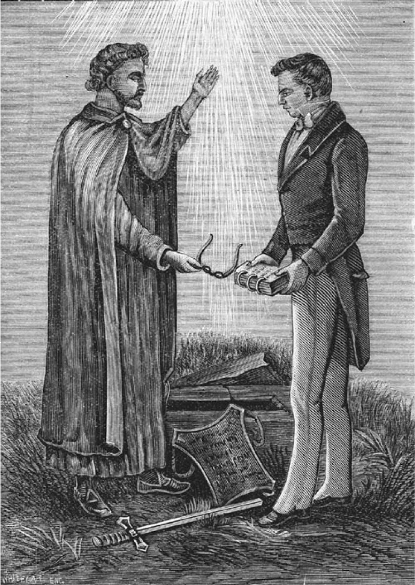
An 1893 engraving depicts Joseph Smith receiving the golden plates, spectacles, breastplate, and sword of Laban.

Smith told associates that September 22, 1827 would be his last chance to receive the plates. A few days prior to the September 22, Smith's loyal treasure-hunting friends Josiah Stowell and Joseph Knight Sr. traveled to Palmyra to be there during Smith's scheduled visit to the hill. Late at night, Smith took a horse and carriage to the hill Cumorah with Emma. While Emma stayed behind kneeling in prayer, Smith walked to the site of the buried plates. Sometime in the early morning hours, he said that he retrieved the plates and hid them in a hollow log on or near Cumorah. At the same time, Smith said he received a pair of large spectacles with lenses consisting of two seer stones. An 1835 update to a 1831 revelation names the spectacles as the "Urim and Thummim", elements of the high priest's breastplate described in the Old Testament.

==== Book of Mormon Translation and Revelation (1828) ====
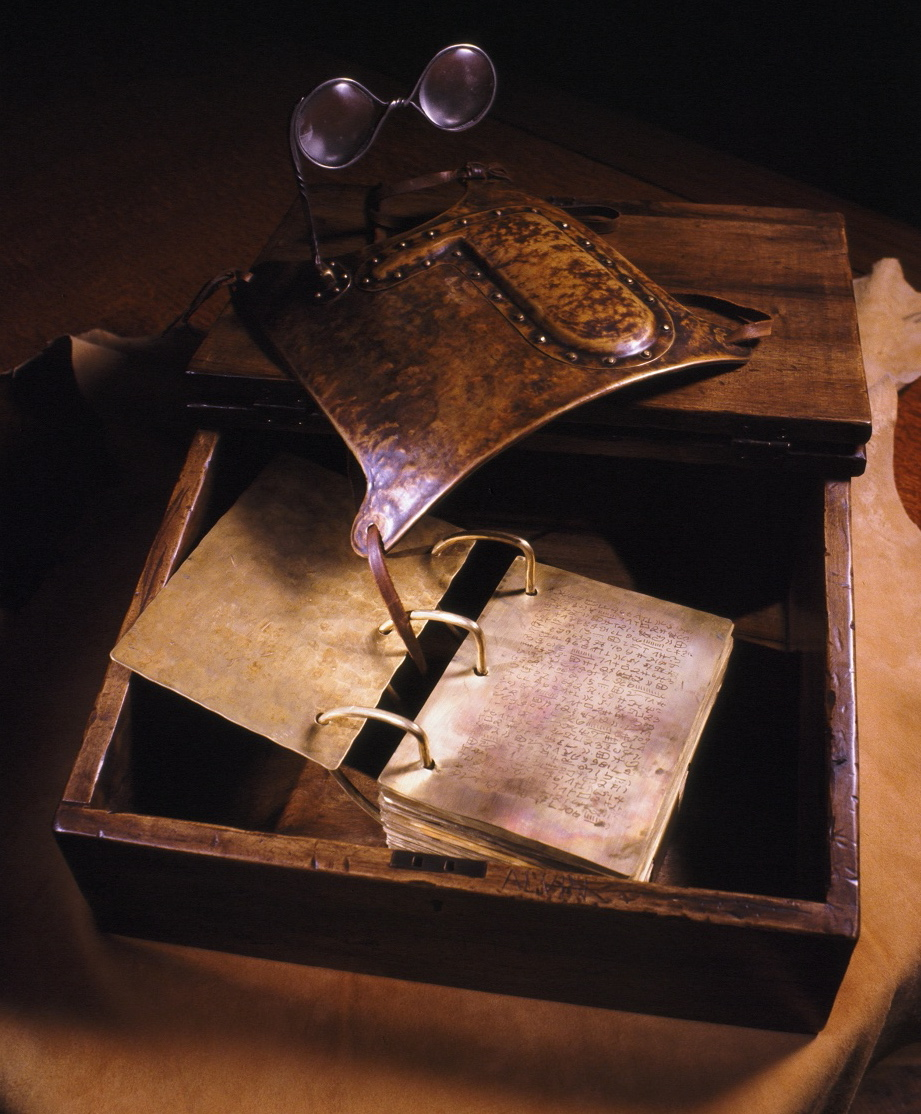
An artistic representation of the golden plates with the spectacles connected to a breastplate, based on descriptions by Smith and others.

In February 1828, Martin Harris traveled to Harmony, Pennsylvania to serve as a "scribe" while Smith dictated the translation of the golden plates. By June 1828, Smith and Harris's work on the translation had resulted in 116 pages of manuscript.

Smith called the Book of Mormon a translated work, but in public he generally described the process itself only in vague terms, saying he translated by a miraculous gift from God.

Between 1828 and 1829, Smith dictated the Book of Mormon to various assistants. The dictation of the extant Book of Mormon was completed in 1829 in between 53 and 74 working days.

Beginning in July 1828, in response to the loss of the 116 pages, Smith began to issue revelations. According to Bushman, the "signal feature" of Smith's life was "his sense of being guided by revelation". Instead of presenting his ideas with logical arguments, Smith dictated authoritative scripture-like "revelations" and let people decide whether to believe, doing so with what Peter Coviello calls "beguiling offhandedness". Smith and his followers treated his revelations as being above teachings or opinions, and he acted as though he believed in his revelations as much as his followers. The revelations were written as if God himself were speaking through Smith, often opening with words such as, "Hearken O ye people which profess my name, saith the Lord your God".

[The Holy Spirit] may give you sudden strokes of ideas, so that by noticing it, you may find it fulfilled the same day or soon; those things that were presented unto your minds by the Spirit of God, will come to pass.

— Joseph Smith

Smith's followers taught that his revelations were recorded by a scribe without revisions or corrections. The revelations were "couched in language suitable to Joseph's time".

Book of Mormon published (1830)

The Book of Mormon has been called the longest and most complex of Smith's revelations. Its language resembles the King James Version of the Bible, as does its organization as a compilation of smaller books, each named after prominent figures in the narrative. It tells the story of the rise and fall of a Judeo-Christian religious civilization in the Western Hemisphere, beginning about 600 BC and ending in the fifth century. The book explains itself to be largely the work of Mormon, a Nephite prophet and military figure. Christian themes permeate the work.

External videos
- Presentation by Remini on Joseph Smith, October 19, 2002, C-SPAN

Some scholars have considered the Book of Mormon a response to pressing cultural and environmental issues in Smith's day. Historian Dan Vogel regards the book as autobiographical in nature, reflecting Smith's life and perceptions. Biographer Robert V. Remini calls the Book of Mormon "a typically American story" that "radiates the revivalist passion of the Second Great Awakening". Author Fawn Brodie suggested that Smith composed the Book of Mormon by drawing on sources of information available to him, such as the 1823 book View of the Hebrews. Other scholars argue the Book of Mormon is more biblical in inspiration than American. Richard Bushman writes that "the Book of Mormon is not a conventional American book" and that its structure better resembles the Bible. According to historian Daniel Walker Howe, the book's "dominant themes are biblical, prophetic, and patriarchal, not democratic or optimistic" like the prevailing American culture. Author Jan Shipps argues that the Book of Mormon's "complex set of religious claims" provided "the basis of a new mythos" or "story" which early converts accepted and lived in as their world, thus departing from "the early national period in America into a new dispensation of the fulness of times".

=== Early Ohio teachings ===
In June 1830, Smith dictated a revelation in which Moses narrates a vision in which he sees "worlds without number" and speaks with God about the purpose of creation and the relation of humankind to deity. This revelation initiated a revision of the Bible which Smith worked on sporadically until 1833 but which remained unpublished until after his death. He may have considered it complete, though according to Emma Smith, the biblical revision was still unfinished when Joseph died.

In the course of producing the Book of Mormon, Smith declared that the Bible was missing "the most plain and precious parts of the gospel". He produced a "new translation" of the Bible, not by directly translating from manuscripts in another language, but by amending and appending to a King James Bible in a process which he and Latter Day Saints believed was guided by inspiration; Smith asserted his translation would correct lacunae and restore what the contemporary Bible was missing. While many changes involved straightening out seeming contradictions or making small clarifications, other changes added large interpolations to the text. For example, Smith's revision nearly tripled the length of the first five chapters of Genesis into a text called the Book of Moses.

In 1831 in Kirtland, Ohio, Smith's revision of the Gospel of Matthew was published in an undated broadsheet as "Extract from the New Translation of the Bible". His revision of Genesis, chapters that now make up the Book of Moses, were first published in the church newspapers Evening and Morning Star and Times and Seasons in the 1830s and 1840s.

==== Communalism (1831) ====
Smith gave varying types of revelations. Some were temporal, while others were spiritual or doctrinal. Some were received for a specific individual, while others were directed at the whole church. An 1831 revelation called "The Law" contained directions for missionary work, rules for organizing society in Zion, a reiteration of the Ten Commandments, an injunction to "administer to the poor and needy" and an outline for the law of consecration. Smith temporarily instituted a form of religious communism, called the United Order, that required Latter Day Saints to give all their property to the church, to be divided among the faithful. He also envisioned that the theocratic institutions he established would have a role in the worldwide political organization of the Millennium.

At first, Smith's church had little sense of hierarchy, and his religious authority was derived from his visions and revelations. Though he did not claim exclusive prophethood, an early revelation designated him as the only prophet allowed to issue commandments "as Moses". In 1831, Smith introduced the High Priesthood and taught that its recipients would be "endowed with power from on high", fulfilling a desire for a greater holiness and an authority commensurate with the New Testament apostles. Another 1832 revelation was the first to explain priesthood doctrine.

==== End Times and Zion (1831) ====
Smith taught the he and his followers were living in the "later days", calling church members "Later-Day Saints". In 1831, Smith announced a revelation that the Zion of end times would be centered in Independence, Missouri.

==== Three "Degrees of Glory" in the afterlife (1832) ====
An 1832 revelation called "The Vision" added to the fundamentals of sin and atonement, and introduced doctrines of life after salvation, exaltation, and a heaven with degrees of glory. On February 16, 1832, while working on translation of the Bible , Smith and Rigdon received what was known to early Latter Day Saints as "the Vision." It detailed a heaven divided into three degrees of glory (the celestial, terrestrial, and telestial kingdoms), where resurrected beings would go after the final judgement.

==== Book of Commandments and Temperance (1833) ====
In 1833, Smith edited and expanded many of the previous revelations, publishing them as the Book of Commandments, which later became part of the Doctrine and Covenants.

In 1833, at a time of temperance agitation, Smith delivered a revelation called the "Word of Wisdom", which counseled a diet of wholesome herbs, fruits, grains and a sparing use of meat. It also recommended that Latter Day Saints avoid "strong" alcoholic drinks, tobacco, and "hot drinks" (later interpreted to mean tea and coffee). The Word of Wisdom was originally framed as a recommendation rather than a commandment and was not strictly followed by Smith and other early Latter Day Saints, though it later became a requirement in the LDS Church.

Before 1832, most of Smith's revelations concerned establishing the church, gathering followers, and building the city of Zion. Later revelations dealt primarily with the priesthood, endowment, and exaltation. The pace of formal revelations slowed during the autumn of 1833 and again after the dedication of the Kirtland Temple. Smith moved away from formal written revelations spoken in God's voice, and instead taught more in sermons, conversations, and letters. For instance, the doctrines of baptism for the dead and the nature of God were introduced in sermons, and one of Smith's most famed statements, about there being "no such thing as immaterial matter", was recorded from a casual conversation with a Methodist preacher.

=== Evolving authority claims ===
In the mid-1830s, Smith's teaching expanded his claim to authority over an increasingly-hierarchical church. In February 1835, Smith issued revelations to begin naming Apostles and to markedly increase the authority of the high priesthood. Smith said he and Cowdery had received authority to do so during past in-person meetings, years prior, with a litany of biblical figures. After an 1838 split with Cowdery, Smith reported having met God and Jesus, two physical beings, in childhood.

==== The Armies of Israel or "Zion's Camp" elevated in authority (1834–1835) ====
After church members in Independence, Missouri were violently expelled from their homes, Smith dictated a revelation calling upon him to raise an army to "Redeem Zion" and serve as its commander-in-chief.

On February 14, 1835, a "meeting was called for the camp of Zion to be assembled, to receive what was called a Zion's blessing". Smith and the Three Witnesses named twelve men to the office of "Apostle", while other members of the Zion's Camp force were ordained to the priesthood office of "Seventy".

While the High Priesthood dated to 1831, Bushman reports it received little public attention and was not an office of authority until March 1835. That month, Smith, the President of the High Priesthood, issued a revelation declaring that the High Priesthood "holds the right of presidency, and has power and authority over all the offices in the church". The revelation held that "All other authorities, or offices in the church, are appendages to this priesthood". Originally called simply the "High Priesthood", it later became known as the "Melchizedek Priesthood", named for the biblical priest Melchizedek.

Smith taught a hierarchy of three priesthoods—the Melchizedek, the Aaronic, and the Patriarchal. Each priesthood was a continuation of biblical priesthoods through lineal succession or through ordination by biblical figures appearing in visions. By 1835, the "lesser priesthood" was referred to as the Aaronic Priesthood.

==== Past visits by biblical figures to Smith and Cowdery (1835) ====
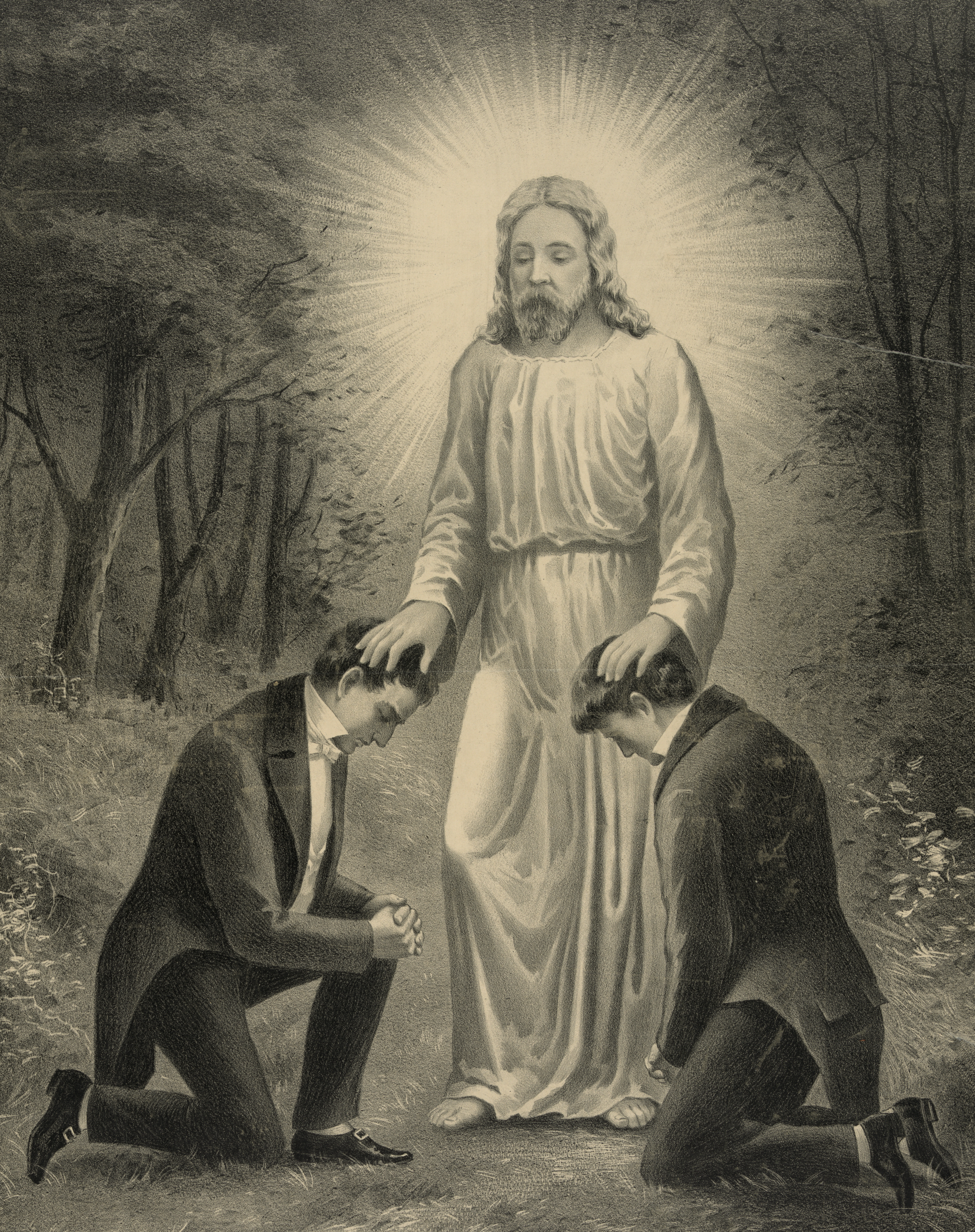
1898 depiction of John the Baptist with Joseph Smith and Oliver Cowdery

In 1835, Smith and his followers published the Doctrine and Covenants featuring an updated version of an 1830 revelation. The text added in 1835 mentioned visits by Moroni, John the Baptist, patriarchs Joseph, Jacob, Isaac, and Abraham, and Michael or Adam, and the apostles Peter, James and John. (Note: Added in 1835 revision: "and with Moroni, whom I have sent unto you to reveal the book of Mormon, containing the fulness of my everlasting gospel; to whom I have committed the keys of the record of the stick of Ephraim; and also with Elias, to whom I have committed the keys of bringing to pass the restoration of all things, or the restorer of all things spoken by the mouth of all the holy prophets since the world began, concerning the last days: and also John the son of Zacharias, which Zachari as he (Elias) visited and gave promise that he should have a son, and his name should be John, and he should be filled with the spirit of Elias; which John I have sent unto you, my servants, Joseph Smith, jr. and Oliver Cowdery, to ordain you unto this first priesthood which you have received, that you might be called and ordained even as Aaron: and also Elijah, unto whom I have committed the keys of the power of turning the hearts of the fathers to the children and the hearts of the children to the fathers, that the whole earth may not be smitten with a curse: and also, with Joseph, and Jacob, and Isaac, and Abraham your fathers; by whom the promises remain; and also with Michael, or Adam, the father of all, the prince of all, the ancient of days: And also with Peter, and James, and John, whom I have sent unto you, by whom I have ordained you and confirmed you to be apostles and especial witnesses of my name, and bear the keys of your ministry")

In his official history, begun in 1838, Smith narrated the encounter: "The messenger who visited us on this occasion and conferred this Priesthood upon us, said that his name was John, the same that is called John the Baptist in the New Testament, and that he acted under the direction of Peter, James and John, who held the keys of the Priesthood of Melchizedek, which Priesthood, he said, would in due time be conferred on us, and that I should be called the first Elder of the Church, and he (Oliver Cowdery) the second. It was on the fifteenth day of May, 1829, that we were ordained under the hand of this messenger, and baptized."

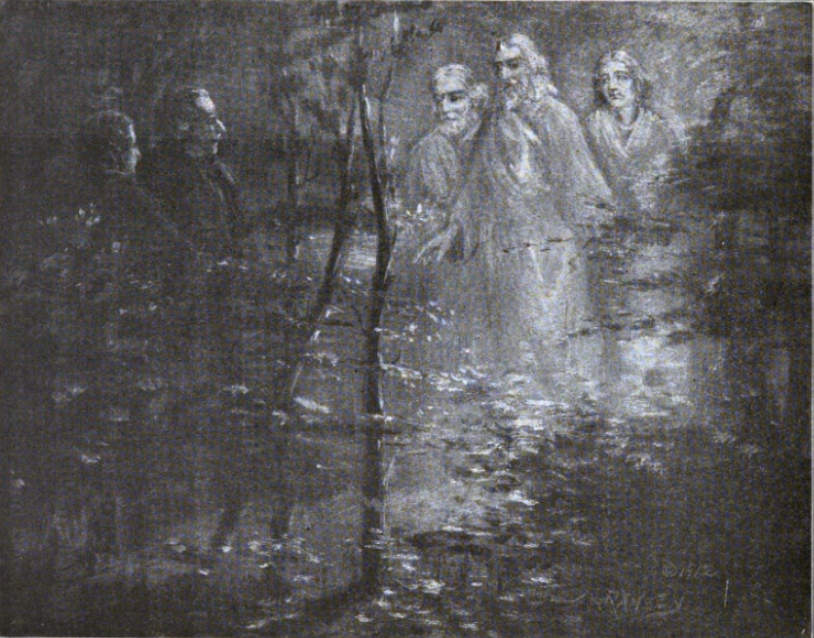
1918 illustration of Joseph Smith and Oliver Cowdery meeting Apostles Peter, John, and James

Smith taught that the High Priesthood's endowment of heavenly power included the sealing powers of Elijah, allowing High Priests to perform ceremonies with effects that continued after death. For example, this power would enable proxy baptisms for the dead and marriages that would last into eternity. Elijah's sealing powers also enabled the second anointing, or "fulness [sic] of the priesthood", which, according to Smith, sealed married couples to their exaltation.

On January 21, 1836, Smith introduced the practice of Washing and anointing. In 1852, years after Smith's death, the Deseret News would publish an account of Smith and Cowdery having seen Jesus, Moses, Elias, and Elijah in April 1836.

==== Childhood encounter with God the Father and Christ (1838) ====
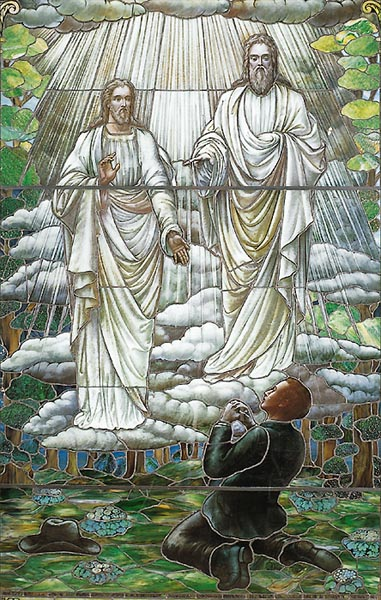
A stained glass (1913) depicting the childhood encounter with Jesus and God the Father, two distinct physical beings, which Smith described in 1838.

On April 12, 1838, Smith's longtime partner Oliver Cowdrey was excommunicated after he criticized Joseph's relationship with Fanny Alger. That year, Smith reported a childhood encounter with 'two personages', God and Jesus, that had occurred years before he had met Cowdery. Smith said that, although he had become concerned about the welfare of his soul, he was confused by the claims of competing religious denominations. Smith wrote that he had received a vision that resolved his religious confusion. He said that in 1820, while he had been praying in a wooded area near his home, God the Father and Jesus Christ together appeared to him, told him his sins were forgiven, and said that all contemporary churches had "turned aside from the gospel". Wrote Smith: "I saw two Personages, whose brightness and glory defy all description, standing above me in the air. One of them spake unto me, calling me by name and said, pointing to the other—This is My Beloved Son. Hear Him!". Smith said he recounted the experience to a Methodist minister, who dismissed the story "with great contempt". According to historian Steven C. Harper, "There is no evidence in the historical record that Joseph Smith told anyone but the minister of his vision for at least a decade", and Smith might have kept it private because of how uncomfortable that first dismissal was. During the 1830s, Smith orally described the vision to some of his followers, though it was not widely published among Mormons until the 1840s. This vision later grew in importance to Smith's followers, who eventually regarded it as the first event in the restoration of Christ's church to Earth. Smith himself may have originally considered the vision to be a personal conversion.

=== Late teachings ===
Smith first taught the doctrine of Baptism for the Dead at the funeral sermon of a deceased church member, Seymour Brunson. In a letter written on October 19, 1840, to the church's Quorum of the Twelve Apostles (who were on a mission in the United Kingdom at the time), Smith refers to the passage in 1 Corinthians 15:29 (KJV):

I presume the doctrine of 'baptism for the dead' has ere this reached your ears, and may have raised some inquiries in your minds respecting the same. I cannot in this letter give you all the information you may desire on the subject; but aside from knowledge independent of the Bible, I would say that it was certainly practiced by the ancient churches; and Saint Paul endeavors to prove the doctrine of the resurrection from the same, and says, 'Else what shall they do which are baptized for the dead, if the dead rise not at all? Why are they then baptized for the dead?'

LDS Church scripture expands further upon this doctrine and states that such baptisms are to be performed in temples. Vicarious baptism is performed in connection with other vicarious ordinances in temples of the Church, such as the endowment and celestial marriage.

Book of Abraham (1842)

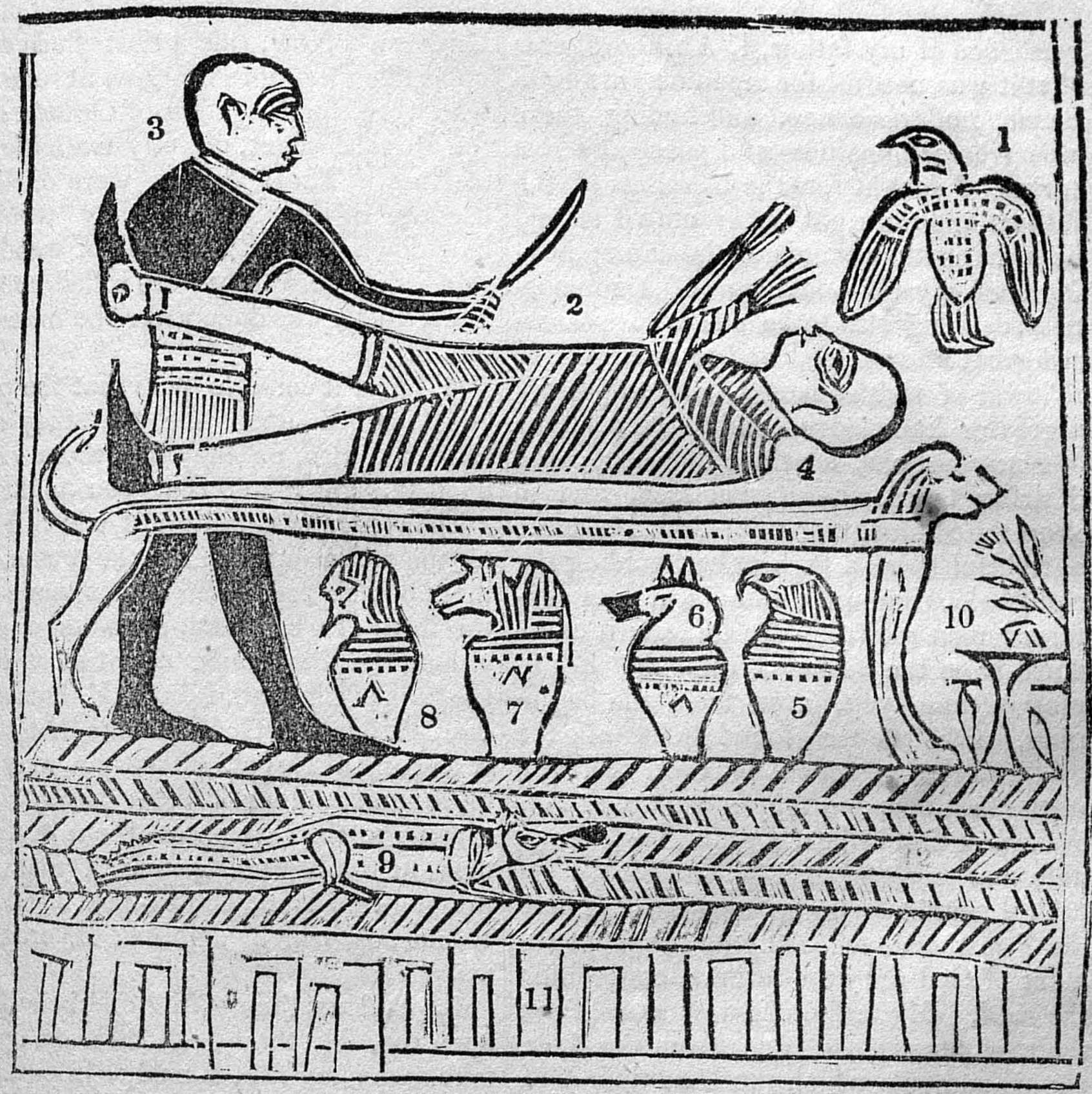
An image which Smith said depicted Abraham tied to an altar.

In 1835, Smith encouraged some Latter Day Saints in Kirtland to purchase rolls of ancient Egyptian papyri from a traveling exhibitor. He said they contained the writings of the ancient patriarchs Abraham and Joseph. Over the next several years, Smith dictated to scribes what he reported was a revelatory translation of one of these rolls, which was published in 1842 as the Book of Abraham. The Book of Abraham speaks of the founding of the Abrahamic nation, astronomy, cosmology, lineage and priesthood, and gives another account of the creation story. The Book of Abraham text is a source of some distinct Latter Day Saint doctrines, which Mormon author Randal S. Chase calls "truths of the gospel of Jesus Christ that were previously unknown to Church members of Joseph Smith's day." Examples include the nature of the priesthood, an understanding of the cosmos, the exaltation of humanity, a pre-mortal existence, the first and second estates, and the plurality of gods.

In 1968, Egyptologists determined the Book of Abraham papyri were from the Egyptian Book of Breathing, with no connection to Abraham.

In his revisions of the Bible, and production of the Book of Abraham he taught that Black people were cursed by God with the curses placed on Cain and Ham, and linked the two curses by positioning Ham's Canaanite posterity as matrilinear descendants of Cain. In another book of the Pearl of Great Price the descendants of Cain are described as dark-skinned. He referred to the curses as a justification for slavery.

==== Freemasonry and temple endowment (1842) ====
The doctrine of endowment evolved through the 1830s until, in 1842, the Nauvoo endowment included an elaborate ceremony containing elements similar to those of Freemasonry and the Jewish Kabbalah. Although the endowment was extended to women in 1843, Smith never clarified whether women could be ordained to priesthood offices.

Soon after joining Freemasonry in March 1842, Smith introduced the temple ceremony referred to as the endowment which included a number of symbolic elements that were very similar to those in Freemasonry. Smith remained a Freemason until his death. On May 3, 1842, Joseph Smith prepared the second floor of his Red Brick Store, in Nauvoo, Illinois, to represent "the interior of a temple as circumstances would permit". The next day, May 4, he introduced the Nauvoo endowment ceremony to nine associates. (Note: These nine were: Associate President and Patriarch to the Church Hyrum (Joseph Smith's brother); first counselor in the First Presidency, William Law; three of the twelve apostles, Brigham Young, Heber C. Kimball and Willard Richards; Nauvoo stake president, William Marks; two bishops, Newel K. Whitney and George Miller; and a close friend, Judge James Adams of Springfield, Illinois.) (Note: Concerning the day's activities, Smith recorded: "[T]he communications I made to this council were of things spiritual, and to be received only by the spiritual minded: and there was nothing made known to these men but what will be made known to all the Saints of the last days, so soon as they are prepared to receive, and a proper place is prepared to communicate them, even to the weakest of Saints: therefore let the Saints be diligent in building the Temple.")

Throughout 1843 and 1844 Smith continued to initiate other men, as well as women, into the endowment ceremony. By the time of his death on June 27, 1844, more than 50 persons had been admitted into the Anointed Quorum, the name by which this group called themselves.

==== Celestial marriage and polygamist theology (1843) ====
In the early 1840s, Smith began to privately teach the practice of plural marriage. Smith taught a theology of family relations, called the "New and Everlasting Covenant", that superseded all earthly bonds. He taught that outside the covenant, marriages were simply matters of contract, and that in the afterlife, individuals who were unmarried or who married outside the covenant would be limited in their progression towards Godhood. To fully enter the covenant, a man and woman must participate in a "first anointing", a "sealing" ceremony, and a "second anointing" (also called "sealing by the Holy Spirit of Promise"). When fully sealed into the covenant, Smith said that no sin nor blasphemy (other than murder and apostasy) could keep them from their exaltation in the afterlife. According to a revelation Smith dictated, God appointed only one person on Earth at a time—in this case, Smith—to possess this power of sealing. According to Smith, men and women needed to be sealed to each other in this new and everlasting covenant (also called "celestial marriage") in order to be exalted in heaven after death and that such celestial marriage, perpetuated across generations, could reunite extended families of ancestors and descendants in the afterlife.

The first time a Second Anointing was performed was on September 28, 1843, when Smith and one of his wives, Emma received it. During Smith's lifetime, the second anointing was performed on at least 20 men and 17 women. Historian Gary James Bergera stated that the ordinance functioned as a de facto marriage sealing.

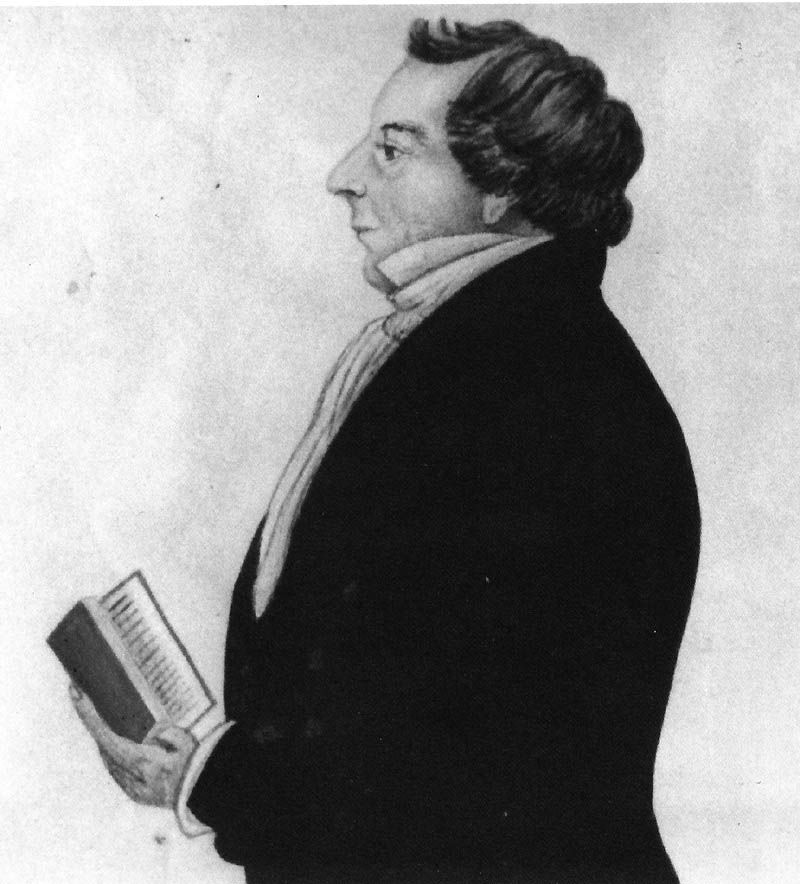
Profile portrait of Smith, by Bathsheba W. Smith, created circa 1843

Plural marriage, or polygamy, was Smith's "most famous innovation", according to historian Matthew Bowman. Once Smith introduced polygamy, it became part of his "Abrahamic project", in the phrasing of historian Benjamin Park, wherein the solution to humanity's chaos would be found through accepting the divine order of the cosmos, under God's authority, in a "fusion of ecclesiastical and civic authority". Smith also taught that the highest level of exaltation could be achieved through marriage sealed with proper authority, the ultimate manifestation of the New and Everlasting Covenant. This included teachings that multiple wives would allow for a larger kingdom with more descendants. It was also believed at the time that polygamy was necessary to attain the highest degree in the celestial kingdom. In Smith's theology, marrying in polygamy made it possible for practitioners to unlearn the Christian tradition which identified the physical body as carnal, and to instead recognize their embodied joy as sacred. Smith also taught that the practice allowed an individual to transcend the angelic state and become a god, accelerating the expansion of one's heavenly kingdom.

==== God as exalted man (1844) ====
God himself, was once as we are now, and is an exalted man... God himself, the Father of us all, dwelt on an earth

— Joseph Smith

While traditional Nicene Christianity taught God was eternal and unchanging, Smith taught that God had once been a man and that men could someday become as God.

By 1843, Smith taught God and Jesus had "a body of flesh and bones as tangible as man". Smith taught that all existence was material, including a world of "spirit matter" so fine that it was invisible to all but the purest mortal eyes. Matter, in Smith's view, could be neither created nor destroyed; the creation involved only the reorganization of existing matter. Like matter, Smith saw "intelligence" as co-eternal with God, and he taught that human spirits had been drawn from a pre-existent pool of eternal intelligences. Nevertheless, according to Smith, spirits could not experience a "fullness of joy" unless joined with corporeal bodies. Therefore, the work and glory of God was to create worlds across the cosmos where inferior intelligences could be embodied.

Smith taught that God was an advanced and glorified man, embodied within time and space. He publicly taught that God the Father and Jesus were distinct beings with physical bodies. Nevertheless, he conceived of the Holy Spirit as a "personage of Spirit". Smith extended this materialist conception to all existence and taught that "all spirit is matter", meaning that a person's embodiment in flesh was not a sign of fallen carnality, but a divine quality that humans shared with deity. Humans are, therefore, not so much God's creations as they are God's "kin". There is also considerable evidence that Smith taught, at least to limited audiences, that God the Father was accompanied by God the Mother. In this conception, God fully understood is plural, embodied, gendered, and both male and female.

Through the gradual acquisition of knowledge, according to Smith, those who received exaltation could eventually become like God. These teachings implied a vast hierarchy of gods, with God himself having a father. In Smith's cosmology, those who became gods would reign, unified in purpose and will, leading spirits of lesser capacity to share immortality and eternal life.

In Smith's view, the opportunity to achieve godhood (also called exaltation) extended to all humanity. Those who died with no opportunity to accept saving ordinances could achieve exaltation by accepting them in the afterlife through proxy ordinances performed on their behalf. Smith said that children who died in their innocence would be guaranteed to rise at the resurrection and receive exaltation. Apart from those who committed the eternal sin, Smith taught that even the wicked and disbelieving would achieve a degree of glory in the afterlife.

== In popular culture ==
In 1940, Vincent Price portrayed Smith in the film Brigham Young. In 1999, a PBS documentary on Smith's life was adapted from the book American Prophet. The network's show Frontline detailed Smith's life in an episode titled "The Mormons" in 2010. In the 2003 South Park episode "All About Mormons", the character of Joseph Smith was voiced by Matt Stone. In the musical Book of Mormon, Smith was variously portrayed by Lewis Cleale, Ron Bohmer, and Christopher Shyer. In 2022, Andrew Burnap portrayed Smith in the miniseries Under the Banner of Heaven. The 2024 psychological horror film Heretic featured extensive discussion of the life of Joseph Smith.

== See also ==
- Criminal charges against Joseph Smith
- History of the Latter Day Saint movement
- List of founders of religious traditions
- Miracles attributed to Joseph Smith
- Mormonism in the 19th century
- New religious movements in the United States and founders including William Miller, Phineas Quimby, Mary Baker Eddy, Charles Taze Russell, Wallace Fard Muhammad, Father Divine, and L. Ron Hubbard
- Outline of Joseph Smith
- Smith family (Latter Day Saints)
