= Miracles attributed to Joseph Smith =

Joseph Smith, Jr. was the leader and founder of the Latter Day Saint movement. Being Continuationist, the movement is characterized by a belief that the miracles, visions, prophecies, and revelations attributed to the biblical era continue still today, contingent upon need and the faith of those involved. This belief is based both upon scriptural teachings in the Bible and Book of Mormon and upon accounts of such miracles performed by Smith.

== Purported miracles ==
While prophecies, visions, and revelations are often considered miracles in and of themselves, Christian belief includes belief in a number of other types of miracles as well. According to various accounts, Joseph Smith performed a number of such miracles.

=== Prophecies, visions and revelations ===
Professing to be a prophet, Joseph Smith predicted a number of future events that he said would come to pass.

While a prophecy deals specifically with future events, visions and revelations deal with the more general aspects of human experiences. Smith's First Vision was the most important and most frequently criticized vision or revelation that he claimed to receive. Other such revelations can be found in the Doctrine and Covenants, a compendium of some of the most important of his revelations, and in other works such as his sermons and his translation of the King James Version of the Bible.

David Whitmer, one of the Three Witnesses of the Book of Mormon, eventually denounced Smith, as a "fallen" prophet rather than a "false" one. He made this distinction on a number of occasions. For instance, many years after his apostasy from Smith's church, Whitmer reacted to claims that he had denied the truthfulness of the Book of Mormon by paying to have his testimony of its authenticity published in three different newspapers. He testified that he and Smith had shared a number of angelic visitations and other spiritual experiences.

=== Translation ===
Joseph Smith claimed to receive power from God to translate ancient texts from dead languages into English. He said he did this by means of "the gift and power of God" and by means of the Urim and Thummim, which he said was delivered to him by an angel named Moroni. The most prominent of his translations was the Book of Mormon. However, he also made corrections and additions to biblical accounts, which can be found in the Joseph Smith Translation of the Bible and in the Pearl of Great Price.

=== Healing ===
According to a number of eye-witness accounts, Joseph Smith is credited with the healings of a large number of individuals.

- Oliver B. Huntington reported that, in spring 1831, Smith healed the lame arm of Elsa, the wife of John Johnson of Hiram, Ohio. This account is corroborated by a Protestant minister. However, he did not attribute the miraculous healing to the power of God.
- Smith related an experience in which he said the Lord gave him the power to raise his father from his deathbed in October 1835.
- Smith related another experience, occurring in December 1835, in which he said the Lord gave him the power to immediately heal Angeline Works when she lay dying, so sick that she could not recognize her friends and family.
- In his personal journal, Wilford Woodruff recorded an event that occurred on July 22, 1839, in which he described Smith walking among a large number of Saints who had taken ill, immediately healing them all. Among those healed were Woodruff himself, Brigham Young, Elijah Fordham, and Joseph B. Noble. Woodruff also tells of how, just after these events occurred, a ferryman who was not a follower of Smith but who had heard of the miracles asked Smith to heal his children, who had come down with the same disease. Smith said that he did not have time to go to the ferryman's house, but he charged Woodruff to go and heal them. Woodruff reports that he went and did as Smith had told him to do and that the children were healed.
- Smith related an experience in which, on July 23, 1839, he charged his brother Don Carlos and his cousin George A. Smith to go and heal about sixty people who were bedridden due to illness. According to his account, all of these people recovered.
- J. Shamp and Margaret Shamp attested to a miracle they saw performed at the behest of Smith by writing the following:

[Dated 19 May 1841]
Be it known that on or about the first of December last, we, J. Shamp and Margaret Shamp, of the town of Batavia, Genesee county, N.Y., had a daughter that had been deaf and dumb four and a half years, and was restored to her hearing, the time aforesaid, by the laying on of the hands of the Elders (Nathan R. Knight and Charles Thompson) of the Church of Jesus Christ of Latter-day Saints, commonly called Mormons, through the power of Almighty God, and faith in the Lord Jesus Christ, as believed and practiced by them in these last days.
[Signed]
J. SHAMP,
M. SHAMP.

- After apostatizing and denying that Smith was a prophet, Fanny Stenhouse recorded an experience in which she said she saw Smith miraculously heal an old woman who had been bedridden for years. In her account, Stenhouse avers that this was not a fake healing. However, she attributes it to an occultic or otherworldly power not directly associated with God.

=== Exorcisms ===
On a number of occasions, Smith's followers credit him with the casting out or warding off of evil spirits and demonic presences. In one tale, when visiting the house of Joseph Knight of Colesville, New York, in April 1830, Smith cast Satan out of Knight's son Newel.

== Failed healings ==
Critic Fawn Brodie contends that Smith did not truly have the power to heal and has cited certain circumstance in which he reportedly tried to heal people but failed.

== Legacy ==
In keeping with Joseph Smith's message, many of those who believe he was a prophet also believe that the miraculous works attributed to him may still be performed by those who hold the priesthood authority that he restored to the world. One example of this is the account of Lorenzo Snow raising Ella Jensen from the dead.
