= Joseph Smith Building =

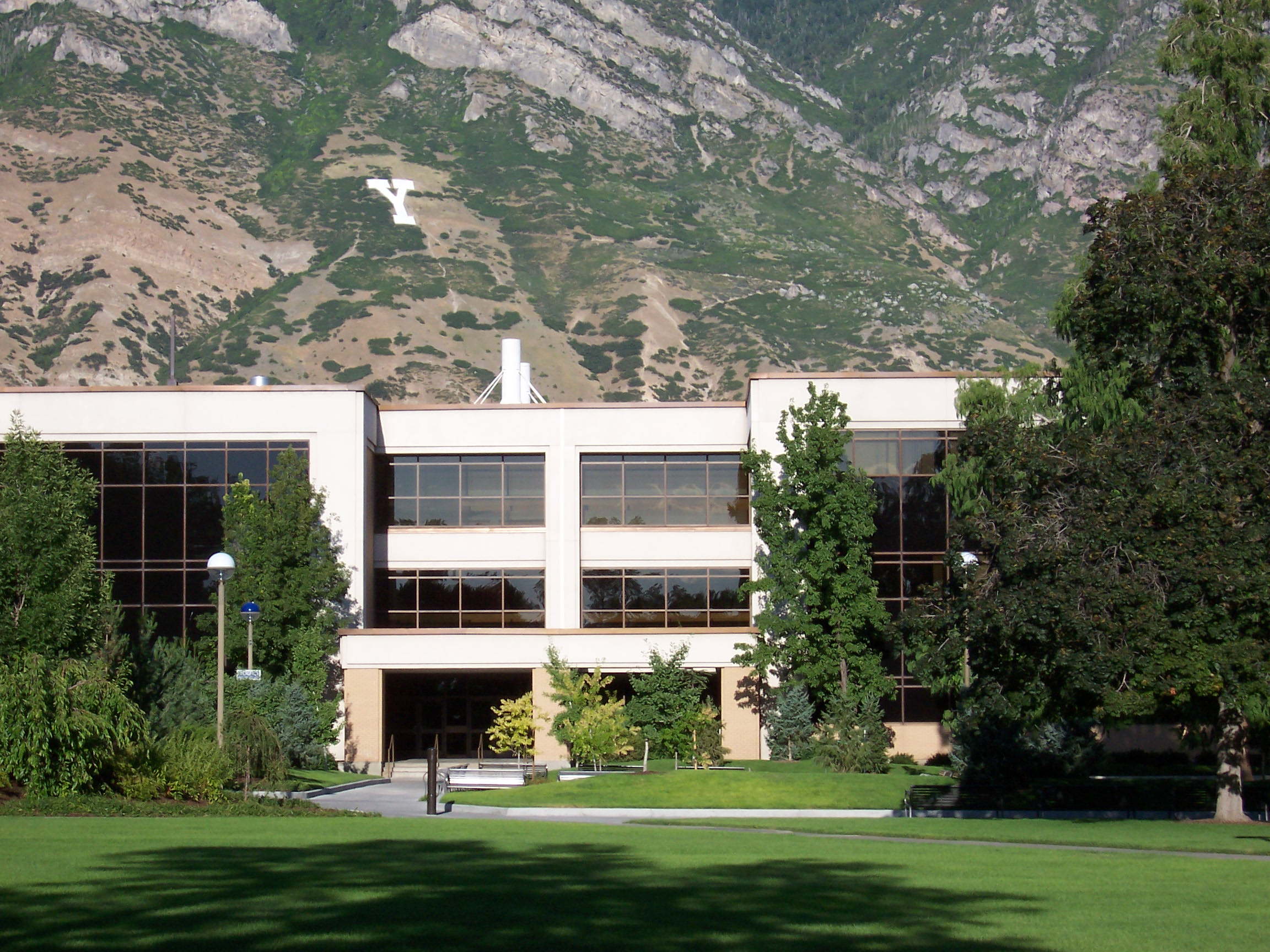
- Interactive map of the Joseph Smith Building area

General information
- Type: Educational
- Location: Provo, Utah
- Coordinates: 40°14′51″N 111°39′04″W
- Completed: 1991

The Joseph Smith Building, also known as the JSB, is a building that houses classrooms and administrative offices at Brigham Young University (BYU) in Provo, Utah, United States. The building is named after Joseph Smith, founder of the Church of Jesus Christ of Latter-day Saints. It is the home to the BYU College of Religious Education, containing most of the offices of religion faculty and many classrooms where religion classes are held. It also has a large lecture hall that seats about 1,000 people and is used for large classes.

== See also ==
- List of Brigham Young University buildings
