= Ryd =

Ryd, or RYD, may refer to:

== Places ==
- Ryd, Linköping, a residential area in Linköping, Sweden
- Ryd, Tingsryd Municipality, Sweden
- Ryd Abbey, a former monastery in Schleswig-Holstein, Germany

== People ==
- Elize Ryd, Swedish singer-songwriter
- Ann-Britt Ryd Pettersson, Swedish news reporter

== Other ==
- RYD, the National Rail code for Ryde Esplanade railway station on the Isle of Wight, UK
- Return YouTube Dislike, a 2021 web browser extension which displays user's YouTube dislikes

== See also ==
- Ryde (disambiguation)
- Ryder (disambiguation)
