= The Ryde =

Bus service in Utah, United States

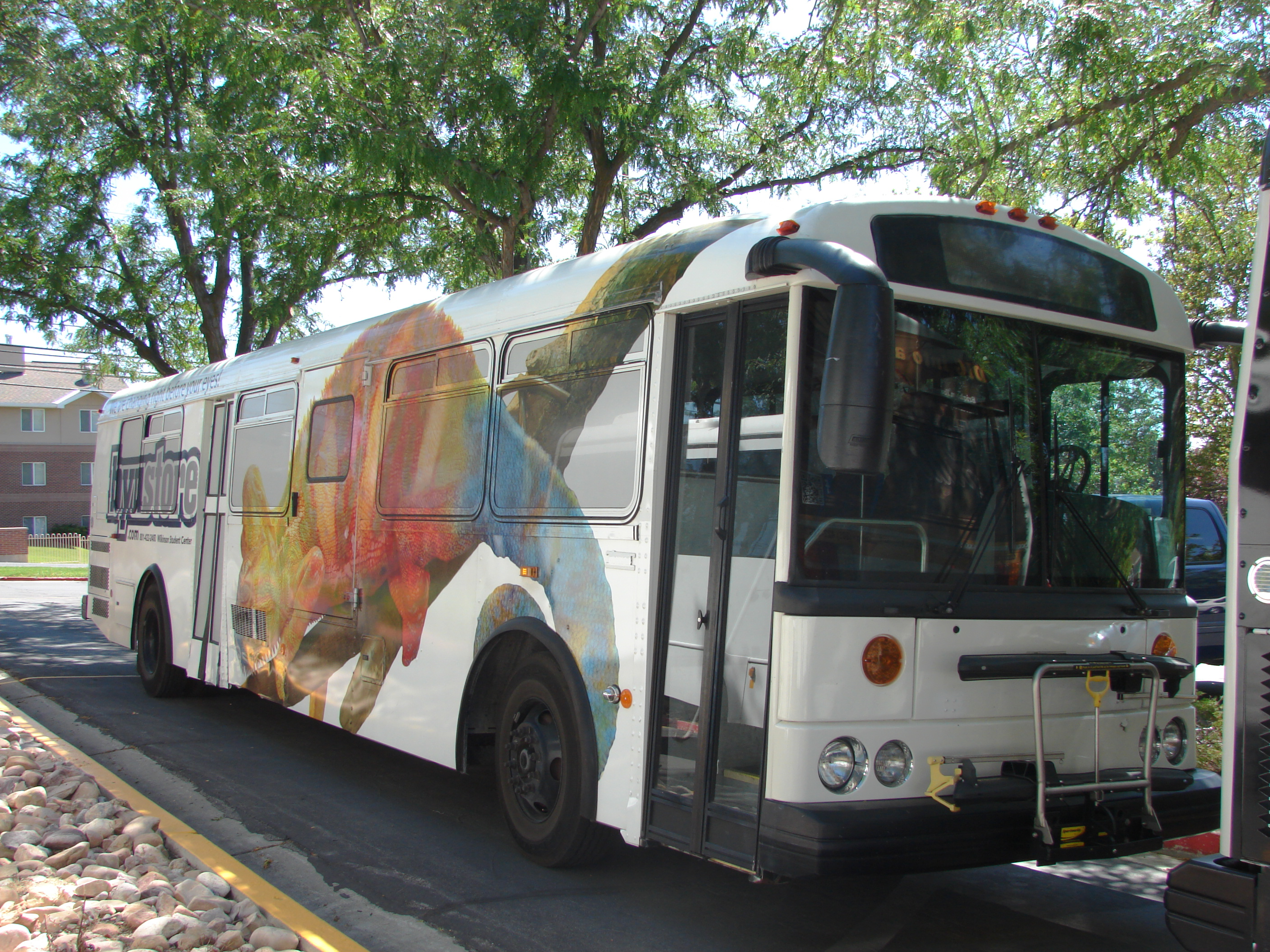
- One of The Ryde's buses parked for the summer, July 2015
- Founded: 2011
- Commenced operation: 4 January 2012
- Locale: Provo, Utah; United States
- Service area: Brigham Young University community (Note: The Brigham Young University (BYU) community served by The Ryde includes all students, faculty, and other employees of BYU, as well as the teaching staff and missionaries at the Provo Missionary Training Center.)
- Service type: Shuttle bus
- Routes: 8
- Stops: Brigham Young University Museum of Art; Ernest L. Wilkinson Student Center
- Destinations: 200 North 400 East; 400 North 400 East; 500 North 100 West; 550 North 500 East; 600 North 600 East; 800 North 100 West; 1065 East 450 North; 1130 East 450 North; Branbury (449 West 1720 North); Carriage Cove/Old Mill (606/724 West 1720 North); Macey's--Saturday only (1400 North State Street); Provo Recreation Center (320 West 500 North); Raintree (1949 North 200 West); Utah Valley Regional Medical Center (1034 North 500 West); Wyview Creamery (1990 North 40 West)
- Fuel type: Compressed natural gas (CNG)
- Operator: Student Movement, Inc.
- Website: studentmovement.byu.edu

The Ryde is a bus service that provides transportation to the Brigham Young University (BYU) community (including the Provo Missionary Training Center) in Provo, Utah, United States. The service is owned and operated by Student Movement, Inc. (SMI) and operates under the brand, "The Ryde". Although The Ryde began as a limited service paid shuttle bus, in the fall of 2015 it expanded to limited-service bus routes that are free to BYU students.

== Description ==
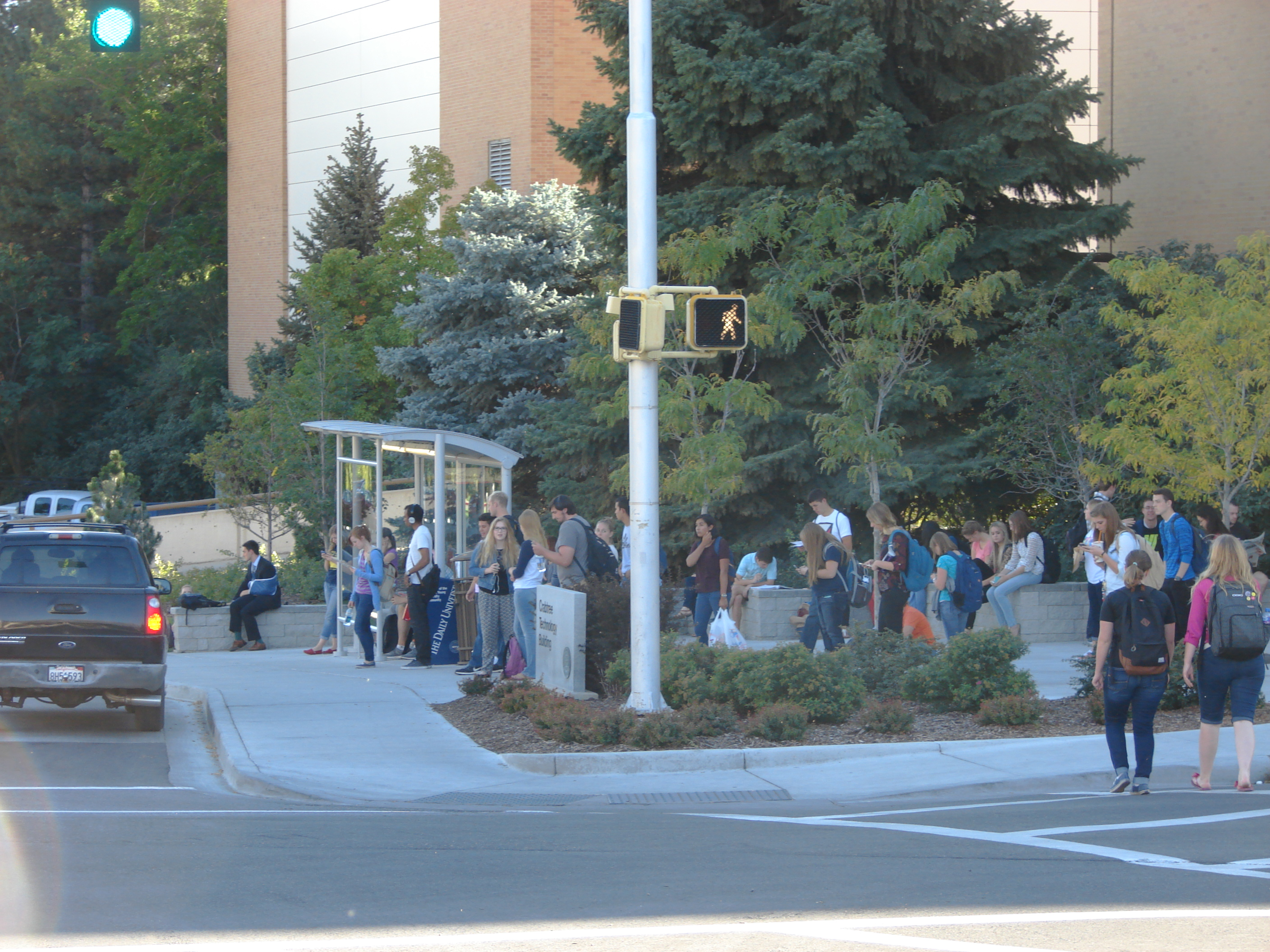
Students waiting for the next bus on The Ryde at the Wilkinson Student Center stop (located in front of the Crabtree Technology Building), September 2015

The purpose of The Ryde's shuttle service is to help transport "thousands" of BYU students between the main campus of BYU and their off-campus housing. While the Utah Transit Authority (UTA) is the primary public transit service provider in Provo and along the Wasatch Front, the founders of The Ryde believed that UTA was not adequately addressing this transportation need. The growing success of The Ryde seems to support this supposition. The Ryde provides (nearly) direct shuttles from most of the major off-campus (and one on-campus) housing areas to the center of the BYU campus (closer than any UTA stops). (Note: All of the Utah Transit Authority's (UTA) routes and stops are on the perimeter of the main BYU campus. The Ryde's two on campus stops are near the center of the main campus.) (Note: The Utah Transit Authority, as part of the Provo Orem Transportation Improvement Project (TRIP), is planning a new bus rapid transit service to enhance bus service to BYU and other major destinations in Provo and southern Orem. The new service, branded as Provo Orem MAX, will provide service between the Orem and Provo FrontRunner stations and is anticipated to begin in late 2017. However, the nearest stops to the main area of BYU for the new service will still be on the perimeter of campus.)

The Ryde's motto is The Ultimate BYU Shuttle Service and its website encouraged students to "Stop overpaying for gas, scraping your frozen windshield and fighting for parking spaces!"

In addition to its regular weekday service The Ryde also provides Saturday morning "Grocery Runs" that pick up passengers along the regular routes, but, instead of going to BYU campus, they go to Macey's grocery store before providing a return trip about forty minutes later. On-campus student housing complexes not included along regular routes are also served by the Grocery Runs. (Note: In addition to the serving the stops on the regular routes, Saturday Grocery Runs are also provided to both the Helaman Halls and Heritage Halls on-campus student housing complexes.)

Although The Ryde serves the BYU community, is authorized to drive buses on BYU property (for the exclusive purpose of picking up and dropping off authorized passengers), and SMI has (or has had) service contracts with both BYU and The Church of Jesus Christ of Latter-day Saints (LDS Church), SMI is not affiliated with either BYU or the LDS Church; and neither BYU nor the LDS Church have any interest in SMI.

=== Destinations ===
The following housing areas and other miscellaneous destinations are served by The Ryde:

- Arcadia Apartments
- Belmont Condominiums
- Bountiful Court Apartments
- Branbury Apartments
- Brittany Apartments
- Brookview Apartments
- Brownstone Condominiums
- Carriage Cove Apartments
- Centennial Apartments
- Centennial II Apartments
- College Park Apartments
- Continental Apartments
- The Crestwood Apartments
- Fleur-de-Lis Apartments
- Foxwood Apartments & Condominiums
- Helaman Halls (Saturday only)
- Heritage Halls (Saturday only)
- King Henry Apartments
- Liberty Square Apartments
- LeGrande Apartments
- Macey's (Saturday only)
- Manavu Condominiums
- Nelson Apartments
- Old Mill Condominiums
- Omni Condominiums
- Provo Recreation Center
- Raintree Commons Apartments
- Roman Garden Apartments
- Southridge Apartments
- Sparks II Apartments
- Summerhays Apartments
- Union Square Apartments
- Utah Valley Regional Medical Center
- The Village at South Campus
- White House
- Winfield Apartments
- Wyview Park

=== Rates ===
As of the Fall 2015 Semester (August 2015) The Ryde became free to all BYU students, faculty, and other employees with their BYU ID. Prior to the fall of 2015, students could purchase a pass for $99.00 per semester or $179.00 per school year (fall and winter semesters). In addition, some apartment complexes subsidized their residents' passes such that they could be purchases for $79.00 per semester. (By comparison, at that time a UTA pass cost $212.00 per semester, but it included access to all of UTA's service area along the Wasatch Front.)

== History ==
=== Origins ===
Since at least 2002, BYU provided students (and often faculty and other employees) the opportunity for either free or substantially subsidized UTA bus passes of one form or another. However, in the fall of 2010, BYU announced that beginning with the Fall 2011 Semester, it would dramatically reduced the amount allotted to UTA pass subsidies. The result was that even with the continued nominal subsidy, there was a dramatic increase in the cost of a UTA pass for students.

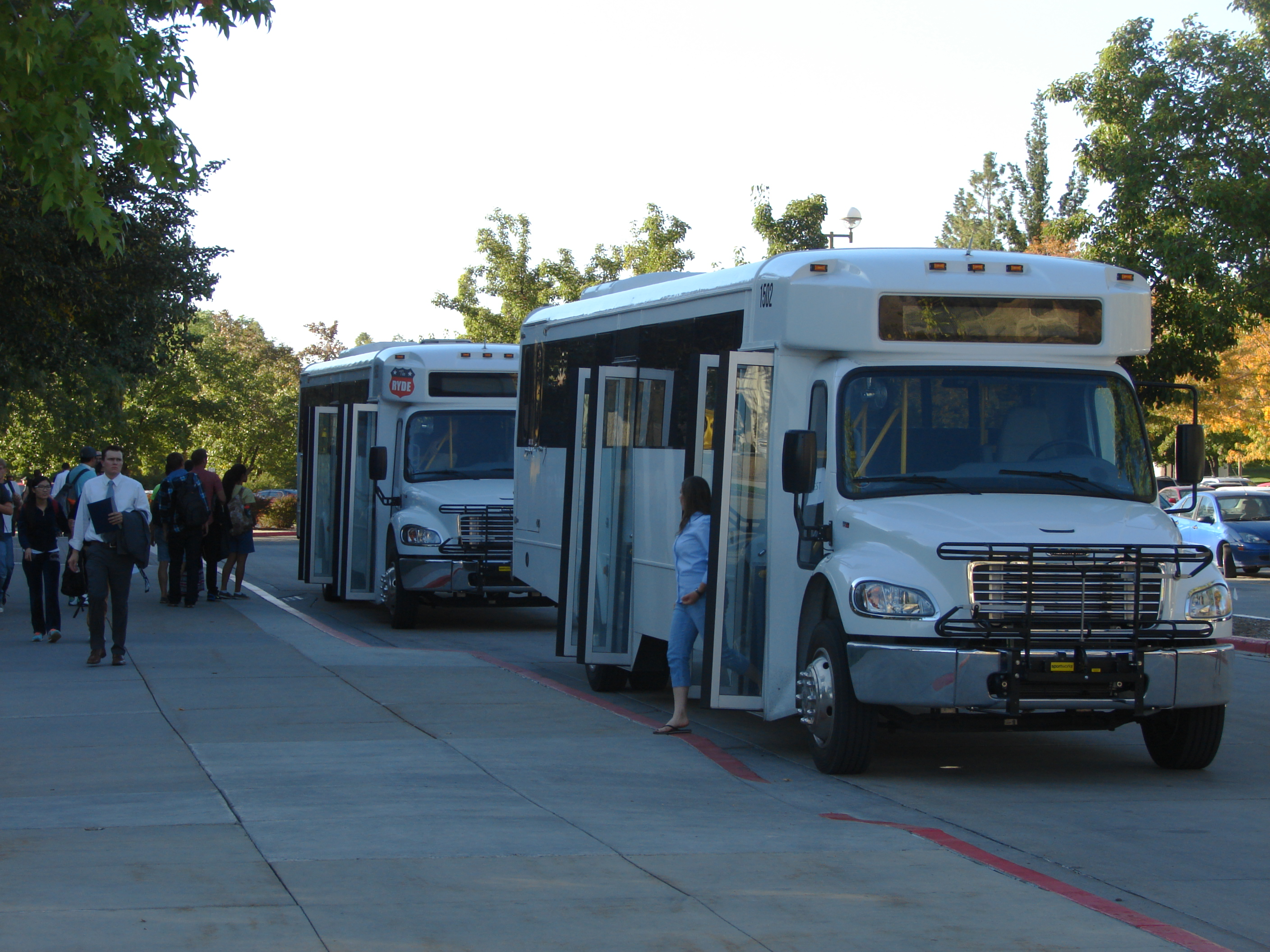
Students getting on and off two of The Ryde's buses that are stopped at the Museum of Art bus stop, September 2016

In mid-2011, BYU announced that beginning with the Winter 2012 Semester, Student Movement, Inc. (SMI) would begin transporting students between certain off-campus housing units and BYU campus. SMI was founded earlier that year by two BYU seniors (Jake Luekenga and Kevin Smith) who believed there was a need for a more specialized service than UTA provided. (While the UTA passes offered access throughout the UTA service area, many of the students used it almost exclusively to travel to and from BYU campus.) Although earnest discussions with the BYU Administration had begun in March, it took until June to reach a firm agreement with BYU and have it signed. (A contract was necessary as SMI would be partially operating on the privately owned campus of BYU.) As soon as the agreement was executed, SMI ordered three buses. The used buses ordered by SMI were similar in size to the 40-foot (12 m) buses utilized by UTA, but would use cleaner burning compressed natural gas (CNG) for fuel, rather than diesel fuel (as used by most of those owned by UTA at the time). Accordingly, Mr. Luekenga claimed, their buses would have 50 percent lower emissions. Another advantage of the new service (over UTA's routes) is that the shuttles would connected directly with the center of BYU campus.

Plans for new shuttle included service to three areas: the King Henry area (southeast of campus), the Alpine Village and Glenwood area (west-northwest of campus), and the Raintree and Wyview Park area (northwest of campus). The single on-campus stop was (as designated by BYU) initially adjacent to the Museum of Art. SMI also indicated that plans included Saturday morning "grocery runs". The cost for the new service was set at $99.00 per semester, but residents of the Glenwood and Raintree complexes would have their passes subsidized such that their cost would be $79.00 per semester. Even before it began service, SMI hoped to expand it service beyond the three destination areas, particularly the Carriage Cove and Branbury area.

=== Paid service ===
Just over a year after The Ryde began service, BYU announced that it would be permanently closing most of East Campus Drive and the eastern end of North Campus Drive. (Note: BYU's motivation for closing portions of East Campus Drive and North Campus Drive was to create a "walking plaza" in the area as part of an overall move create a more unified campus that was more pedestrian-friendly and to encourage more car-free student housing. Later phases of this overall plan resulted in an increased need for the services of The Ryde.) Even though the closures would be in phases, the first phase would begin in May (following the end of the Winter 2013 Semester) and would include closing East Campus Drive between 1100 North and Heritage Drive. As a result of this closure access to the Museum of Art stop for the shuttle coming from the southeast (King Henry) was no longer feasible, so its on-campus stop moved to a location immediately east of the Crabtree Technology Building on East Campus Drive (just southeast of the Wilkinson Student Center). However, this same closure also moved the UTA stop/transfer location (UTA's stop closest to the center of campus) from immediately east of the Wilkinson Student Center (on East Campus Drive) to the perimeter of campus at about 800 East 900 North. The end result of these changes was that The Ryde could continue picking up and dropping off students 1,000–1,500 feet (300–460 m) closer that any UTA stop (depending on the direction of approach to the campus).

By the fall of 2013, an additional route was added to serve the Wymount Terrace on-campus married student housing complex. In October 2013, The Digital Universe reported that missionaries at the temporary west campus of the Missionary Training Center ("MTC West"), which opened in early 2013, were utilizing limited shuttle service provided by Student Movement (The Ryde). (Note: The Missionary Training Center's "MTC West" campus included the Raintree Apartments and a large portion of Wyview Park. (The entire Raintree Apartments complex was temporarily leased to the LDS Church to facilitate the temporary, but large influx of missionaries in 2013.)) Primarily The Ryde transported the missionaries between the main MTC campus, the Provo Temple, and sometimes the Marriott Center. The MTC discontinued the use of the temporary west campus by the end of 2014.

=== Free service ===
In December 2014 BYU announced that beginning with the Fall 2015 Semester most of The Ryde's routes would be enhanced and would be free to all BYU students, faculty, and other employees with their BYU ID. However, the shuttle route that previously ran to Wymount Terrace would be eliminated. Also included in the announcement, BYU indicated that it would begin charging students to park in most of the on-campus lots that had been previously free to students. BYU anticipated that the new $60.00 parking fee would cover the cost of The Ryde's shuttle service. However, since The Ryde does not operate during the spring and summer term, parking in all the student lots will still be free during that time of year. BYU stated that the changes were intended to "incentivize" students to utilize other transportation options instead of their cars. The Ryde's shuttle service eliminates the time that many students spend parking and then walking to the various parts of campus.

Early on plans for the free service included a continuation of the stop near The Lodges at Glenwood Apartments on Route 1. (The stop also served the Alpine Village, Cambridge Court Apartments, Cinnamon Tree Apartments, and Riviera Apartments). However, this stop was eventually dropped from route along with service to these complexes. The route that served Wymount Terrace (which ran through 2014) was also dropped from plans for The Ryde's free service (primarily due to low ridership). However, some Wymount residents have petitioned to reinstate this service. In support of their petition, the students indicate that this route would also provide service for all students to the Student Health Center.

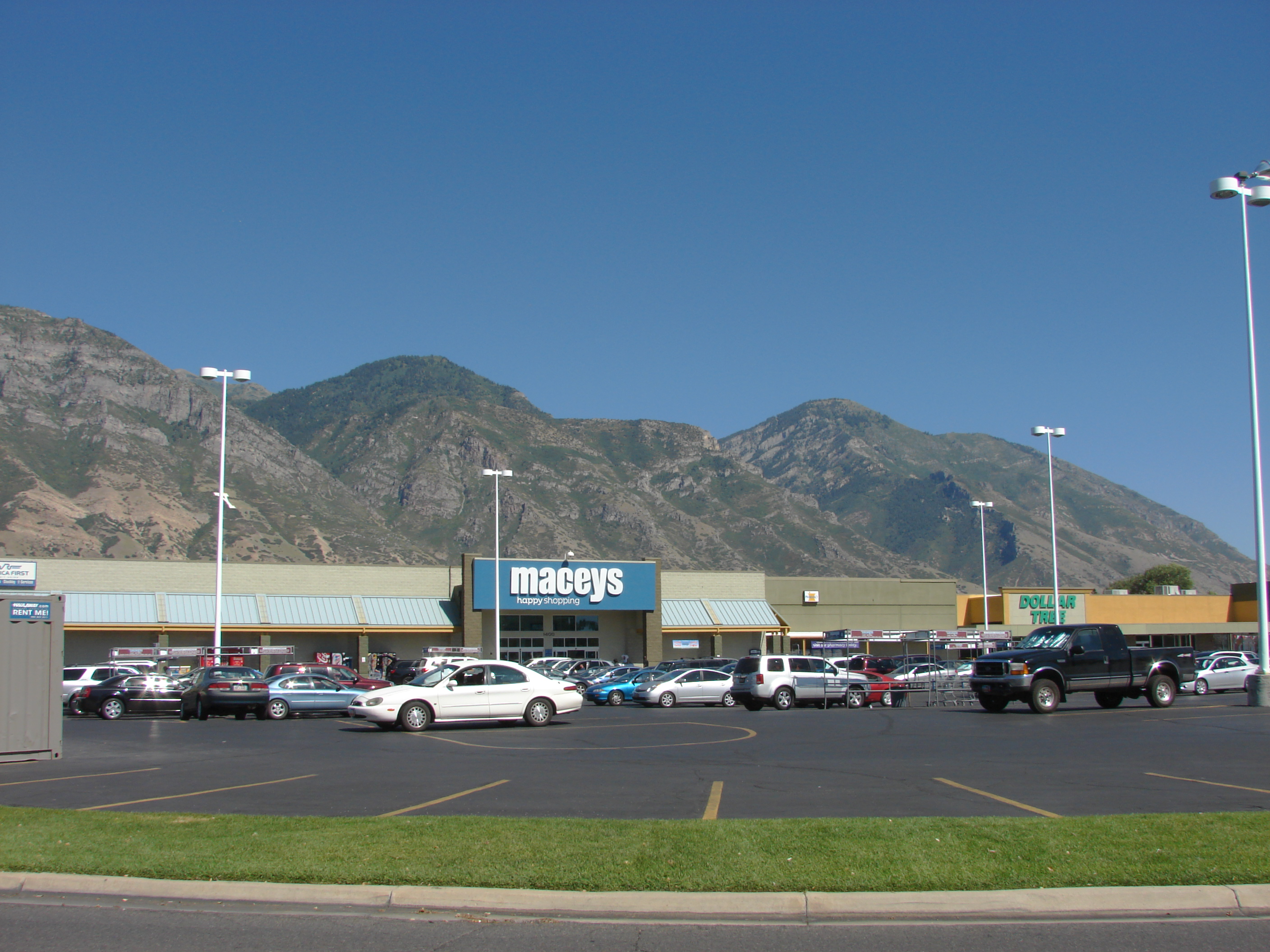
The Provo Macey's grocery store, July 2016

== Routes ==
In addition to the regular routes, (Note: Routes indicated are current as of the Fall 2015/Winter 2016 Semesters.) The Ryde also provides "Saturday Grocery Runs" to Macey's in north Provo. Regular (weekday) service is provided from about 7:30 am to about 9:00 pm Monday through Thursday and from about 7:30 am to about 6:00 pm on Fridays during the fall and winter semesters, but not on school holidays (when school is not in session). During peak times (7:00 am to 10:00 am and 3:00 pm to 6:00 pm) the shuttles run every 15 to 20 minutes. The Saturday "Grocery Runs" pick up (depending on the destination) at 9:00-9:50 am and leave Macey's at 9:50-10:40 am (again, depending on the destination).

The Ryde--fixed routes
Route	Destinations (Note: Destinations on the table are listed in alphabetical order, not in the order of stops.)	Stop locations (Note: Stop locations on the table (except MoA & WSC) are listed in order for the morning runs. Afternoon/evening runs are in reverse order.)
Route 1: Wyview	Raintree Commons Apartments; Wyview Park	MoA; Raintree (1949 North 200 West [North Freedom Boulevard]); Wyview Creamery (1990 North 40 West)
Route 2: King Henry	Arcadia Apartments; Belmont Condominiums; Brownstone Condominiums; Centennial Apartments; Centennial II Apartments; King Henry Apartments; Roman Gardens Apartments; Sparks II Apartments	WSC; 1130 East 450 North; 1065 East 450 North
Route 3: Branbury	Branbury Apartments; Carriage Cove Apartments; The Crestwood Apartments; Old Mill Condominiums	MoA; Branbury (449 West 1720 North); Carriage Cove/Old Mill (606/724 West 1720 North)
Route 4: Joaquin	Bountiful Court Apartments; Brittany Apartments; Brookview Apartments; Cinnamon Tree Apartments; Continental Apartments; Fleur-de-Lis Apartments; Green Gables; LeGrande Apartments; Liberty Square Apartments; Manavu Condominiums; Nelson Apartments; Park Place Apartments; Southridge Apartments; Union Square Apartments; The Village at South Campus; White House; Winfield Apartments	WSC; 200 North 400 East; 400 North 400 East
Route 5: West	College Park Apartments; Foxwood Apartments & Condominiums; Omni Condominiums; Provo Recreation Center; Summerhays Apartments; University Avenue Condominiums; University Villa Apartments; Utah Valley Regional Medical Center	MoA; Utah Valley Regional Medical Center (1034 N 500 West ([US-89]); Provo Recreation Center (320 West 500 North); 800 North 100 West; 500 North 100 West
MoA = Brigham Young University Museum of Art bus stop (Note: The on-campus Museum of Art stop is located immediately northeast of the main entrance of the museum on the southwest edge of the visitor parking lot. The museum is situated just east of the Smoot Administration Building and about 650 feet (200 m) south of the Centennial Carillon Tower (bell tower). (The museum parking lot is only reachable by motor vehicle from the east end of North Campus Drive, with North Campus Drive only being accessible from either East 1230 North [Bulldog Boulevard] or West Campus Drive. The parking lot is not accessible by motor vehicle from the east.) As of November 2015, there was no passenger shelter for this stop.) / WSC = Ernest L. Wilkinson Student Center (Note: The on-campus Wilkinson Student Center stop is located just east of the Crabtree Technology Building immediately southwest of the intersection of East Campus Drive and East 1060 North. It is positioned on the right side of the southbound lane of East Campus Drive and includes an improved passenger shelter. The Wilkinson Student Center is situated just north of the Crabtree Technology Building, just east of the Harold B. Lee Library, south of the Harris Fine Arts Center, and southwest of the J. Ruben Clark Building (Law School). (The site is accessible from either East 900 North [via East Campus Drive] or North 900 East [via East 1100 North].))

== See also ==
- Utah Valley Express
