= Raleigh North Carolina Temple =

Temple of the LDS Church

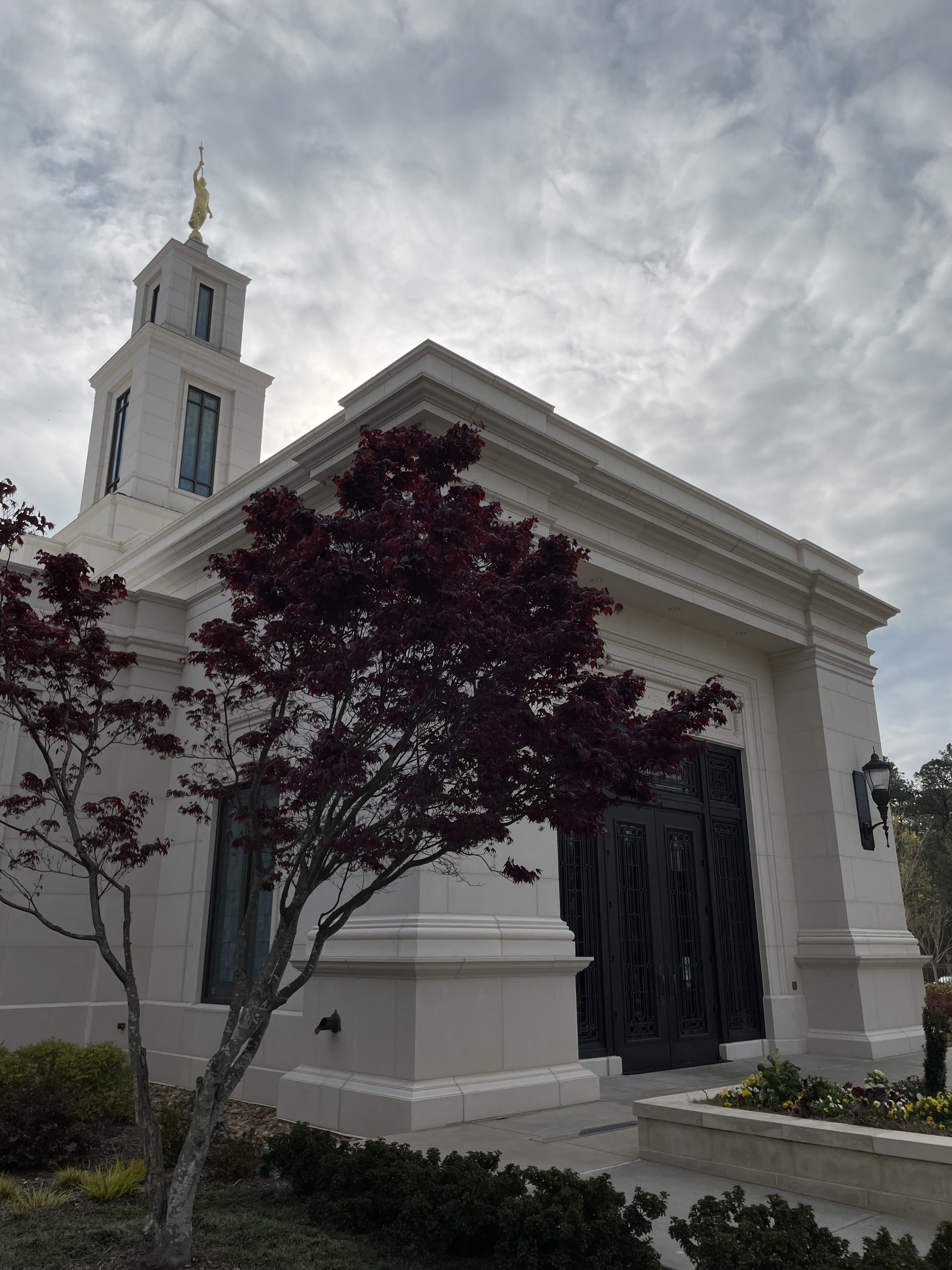
- Interactive map of Raleigh North Carolina Temple
- Number: 68
- Dedication: December 18, 1999, by Gordon B. Hinckley
- Site: 3.17 acres (1.28 ha)
- Floor area: 12,864 ft^{2} (1,195.1 m^{2})
- Height: 71 ft (22 m)
- Official website • News & images

Church chronology
| ← Edmonton Alberta Temple | Raleigh North Carolina Temple | → St. Paul Minnesota Temple |

Additional information
- Announced: September 3, 1998, by Gordon B. Hinckley
- Groundbreaking: February 6, 1999, by Loren C. Dunn
- Open house: December 3–11, 1999; September 21–28, 2019
- Rededicated: October 13, 2019, by M. Russell Ballard
- Current president: Enos Tracy
- Designed by: Dan Dills - Architect: Dills and Ainscuff. Contractor: Walbridge Aldinger.
- Location: Apex, North Carolina, United States
- Coordinates: 35°43′55.59960″N 78°51′41.55120″W
- Exterior finish: Imperial Danby White marble quarried in Vermont with art glass windows
- Design: Classic modern, single-spire design
- Baptistries: 1
- Ordinance rooms: 2 (two-stage progressive)
- Sealing rooms: 2

The Raleigh North Carolina Temple is a temple of the Church of Jesus Christ of Latter-day Saints (LDS Church) located in Apex, North Carolina, a suburb of Raleigh. It was the church's first in North Carolina and its 68th operating temple when it was dedicated in 1999. The intent to build the temple was announced on September 3, 1998, by the church's First Presidency. Designed by Tetrad Architecture & Planning, the single-story structure has a Danby white marble, a central spire with a gold-leafed statue of the angel Moroni, and custom art glass windows using the dogwood blossom, the state flower of North Carolina. A groundbreaking ceremony was held on February 6, 1999, and the temple was completed in ten months.

The temple underwent a major renovation in 2018–2019, which included a height increase to the spire, mechanical upgrades, and refreshed interior finishes. The temple was rededicated on October 13, 2019, by M. Russell Ballard, acting president of the Quorum of the Twelve Apostles. During its 2019 open house, the temple welcomed approximately 40,000 visitors.

== History ==
The Raleigh North Carolina Temple was announced by the First Presidency on September 3, 1998. On February 6, 1999, the church announced that the temple would be constructed on a 3.17‑acre property at 574 Bryan Drive in Apex, a suburb of Raleigh. The temple would be outlined 78 feet tall, with a floor plan of approximately 10,700 sq ft, featuring two ordinance rooms, two sealing rooms, and a baptistry.

Construction began with a groundbreaking ceremony on February 6, 1999, presided over by Loren C. Dunn, a general authority who was first counselor in the presidency of the North America East Area. Nearly 1,000 local church members, youth, and community leaders—including local government officials and Chamber of Commerce members—attended the event.

After ten months of construction, a public open house was held from December 3–11, 1999, drawing approximately 31,638 visitors. The temple was dedicated on December 18-19, 1999, by church president Gordon B. Hinckley, in seven sessions, with a combined attendance of 9,096. It was the church's 68th operating temple and the first in North Carolina.

In January 2018, the temple closed for a major renovation that included upgrades to mechanical and electrical systems, improvements for ADA compliance, a modified canopy enclosure, rearrangement of certain windows and doors, and a 10‑ft height increase to the tower.

To commemorate its reopening, a Labor Day 5K event was held on September 2, 2019, attracting over 600 participants. A public open house followed from September 21–28, 2019, excluding Sunday, with around 40,000 visitors. The temple was rededicated on October 13, 2019, by M. Russell Ballard.

In 2020, like all the church's others, the Raleigh North Carolina Temple was closed for a time in response to the COVID-19 pandemic.

== Design and architecture ==
The temple is on a 3.17-acre plot in Apex and is surrounded by a landscaped garden featuring shade trees, shrubs, perennials, and other vegetation.

Originally done with Danby white marble, the temple’s exterior was updated during renovation with limestone from Vermont. It includes a central spire, extended by 10 feet, with an angel Moroni statue. Renovation updates included enclosing the portico and changing art glass, including creme, gold, and blue colors, featuring the dogwood tree blossom.

The interior has daphne white stone tile, custom art-glass windows with blue, gold, and cream, and decorative gold-leaf pinstriping. The dogwood blossom, and a “lazy eight” are repeated motifs found throughout the temple. The temple has two ordinance rooms, two sealing rooms, and a baptistry.

The temple’s spire, glasswork, and floral designs reflect both Latter-day Saint theology and regional culture. The dogwood blossom symbolizes rebirth and ties the sacred interior to North Carolina’s natural beauty.

== Temple presidents and admittance ==
Each of the church's temples are directed by a temple president and matron, each typically serving for a term of three years. The president and matron oversee the administration of temple operations and provide guidance and training for both temple patrons and staff. Serving from 1999 to 2004, Richard D. Lee was the first president, with Jean R. Lee serving as matron. As of 2023, the temple president is Matthew S. Harding, with Reneé R. Harding serving as matron.

On May 3, 2019, the church announced the public open house that was held from September 21–28, 2019 (excluding Sunday). The open house had approximately 40,000 visitors, and a community 5K run was held on September 2, 2019, with over 600 participants. After renovation, the temple was rededicated on October 13, 2019, by M. Russell Ballard, in five sessions. Temples differ from church meetinghouses, where Sunday meetings are held. Like all the church's temples, it is not used for Sunday worship services. To members of the church, temples are regarded as sacred houses of the Lord. Once dedicated, only church members with a current temple recommend can enter for worship.

== Gallery ==
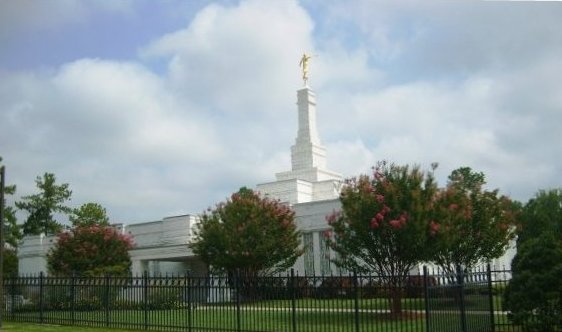
Raleigh North Carolina Temple, 2008

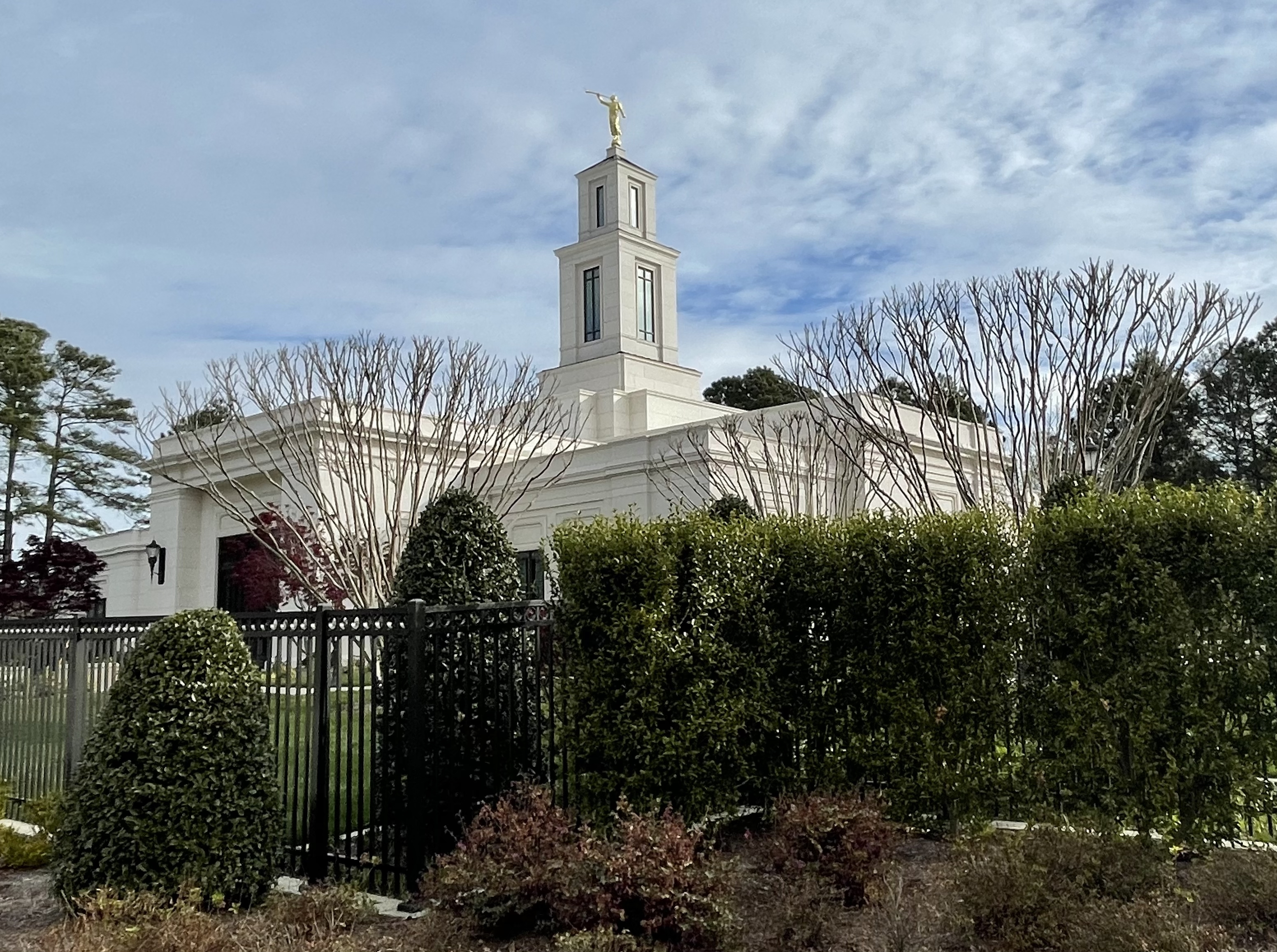
Raleigh North Carolina Temple Exterior, 2023

== See also ==
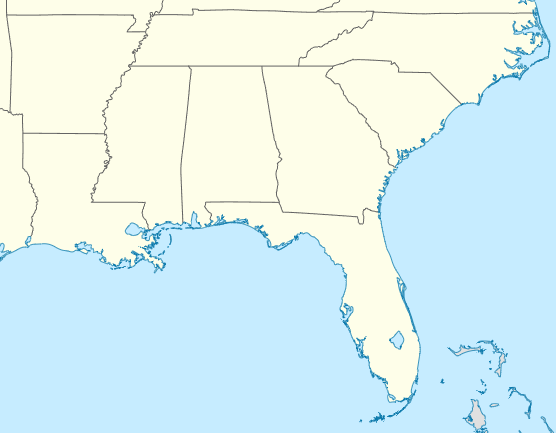
Temples in the Southeastern United States
- = Operating
- = Under construction
- = Announced
- = Temporarily Closed
- Comparison of temples of The Church of Jesus Christ of Latter-day Saints
- List of temples of The Church of Jesus Christ of Latter-day Saints
- List of temples of The Church of Jesus Christ of Latter-day Saints by geographic region
- Temple architecture (Latter-day Saints)
- The Church of Jesus Christ of Latter-day Saints in North Carolina

== Additional reading ==
- Martschenko, Christy (February 13, 1999), "Ground broken for first temple in North Carolina", Church News
- "1,200 youth help prepare temple site for ceremony", Church News, February 13, 1999
- "Golden statues of angel set atop temples in Edmonton, Raleigh", Church News, September 11, 1999
- Emerson, Randolyn J. (December 25, 1999), "Open house fosters good will in temple community", Church News
- Lloyd, R. Scott (December 25, 1999), "A Christmastime 'offering' to the Lord", Church News
- "North Carolina temple earns award for appearance", Church News, June 2, 2001
