= The Church of Jesus Christ of Latter-day Saints in North Carolina =

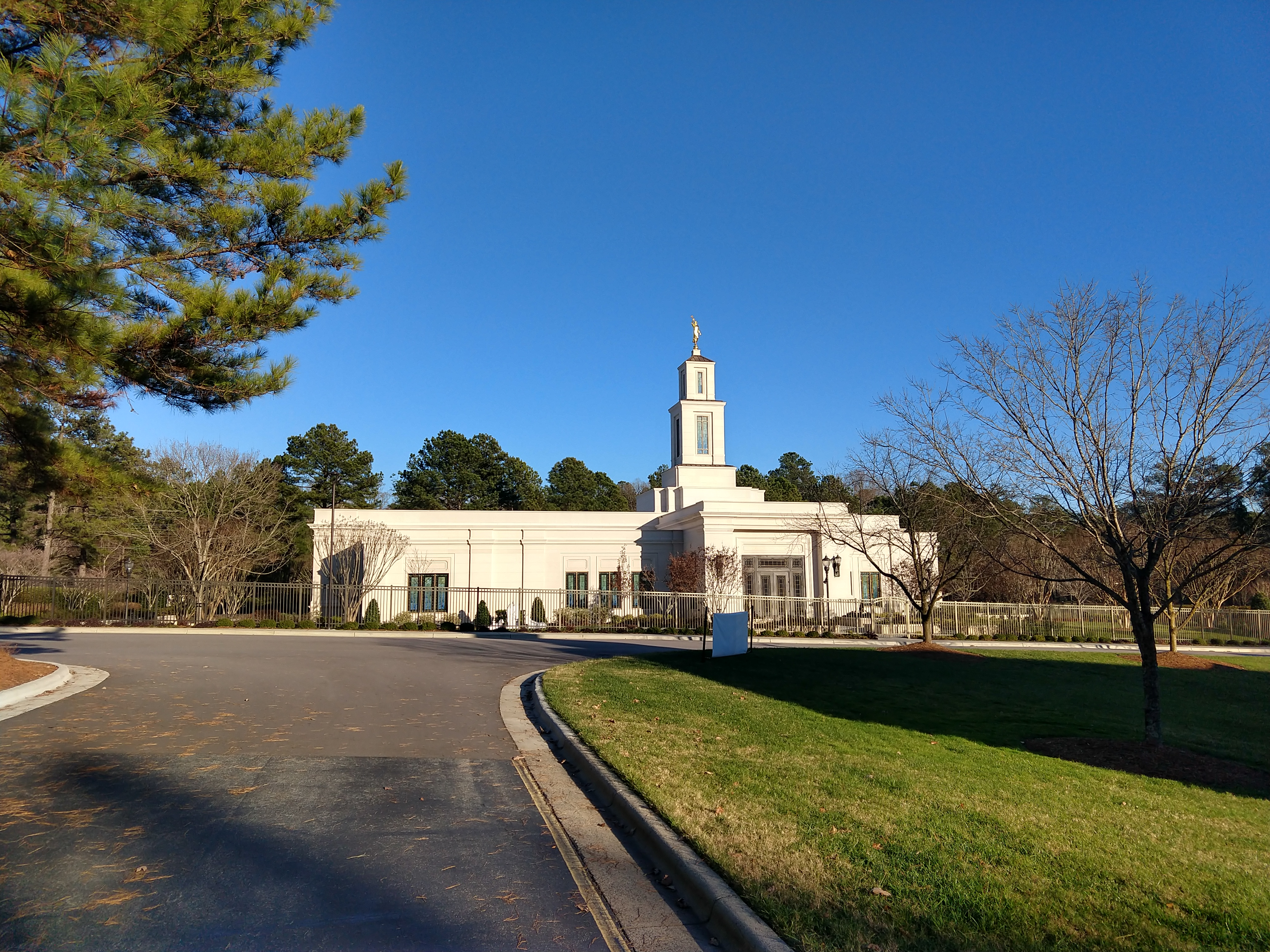
- The Raleigh North Carolina Temple
- Area: US Southeast
- Members: 98,483 (2025)
- Stakes: 20
- Wards: 145
- Branches: 27
- Total Congregations: 172
- Missions: 2
- Temples: 1 operating 1 announced 2 total
- FamilySearch Centers: 51

The Church of Jesus Christ of Latter-day Saints in North Carolina refers to the Church of Jesus Christ of Latter-day Saints (LDS Church) and its members in North Carolina. In 1894, there were 128 members of the LDS Church.

Official church membership as a percentage of general population was 0.82% in 2014. According to the 2014 Pew Forum on Religion & Public Life survey, roughly 1% of North Carolinans self-identify themselves most closely with The Church of Jesus Christ of Latter-day Saints. The LDS Church is the 8th largest denomination in North Carolina.

== History ==
Membership in North Carolina
Year	Members
1894	128
1930	2,725
1980	29,512
1990	45,960
1999	56,261
2009	74,185
2019	89,083
2025	98,483
Source: Windall J. Ashton; Jim M. Wall, Deseret News, various years, Church Almanac State Information: North Carolina

North Carolina was originally part of the Southern States Mission when it was created on December 15, 1896. It then became part of the East Central States Mission on December 9, 1928. On October 26, 1947, it became part of the Central Atlantic States Mission. The mission was then renamed the North Carolina-Virginia Mission on June 10, 1970.

The North Carolina Mission was organized on July 18, 1973. It was renamed the North Carolina Greensboro Mission on June 20, 1974. On July 1, 1980, the mission split moving the mission office to Charlotte. The North Carolina Charlotte and the North Carolina Raleigh Missions were the result of the split.

== Stakes ==
The following stakes are a list of stakes with stake centers in North Carolina as of July 2026:

Stake	Organized	Mission	Temple District
Apex North Carolina Stake	19 Oct 2003	North Carolina Raleigh	Raleigh North Carolina
Asheville North Carolina Stake	25 Nov 1979	Tennessee Knoxville	Columbia South Carolina
Charlotte North Carolina Central Stake	21 Sep 1986	North Carolina Charlotte	Columbia South Carolina
Charlotte North Carolina South Stake (Note: The Charlotte Stake was organized on November 19, 1972, then renamed the Charlotte North Carolina Stake on September 21, 1986, then renamed Charlotte North Carolina South Stake on September 21, 1986.)	19 Nov 1972	North Carolina Charlotte	Columbia South Carolina
Chesapeake Virginia (Note: Stake located outside North Carolina with congregation(s) meeting in North Carolina)	17 Jan 1988	Virginia Norfolk	Richmond Virginia
Coal Mountain Georgia	6 May 2018	Georgia Atlanta North	Atlanta Georgia
Durham North Carolina Stake	3 May 1987	North Carolina Raleigh	Raleigh North Carolina
Fayetteville North Carolina Stake	8 Jun 1975	North Carolina Raleigh	Raleigh North Carolina
Gastonia North Carolina Stake	4 Jun 2006	North Carolina Charlotte	Columbia South Carolina
Goldsboro North Carolina Stake	30 May 1982	North Carolina Raleigh	Raleigh North Carolina
Greensboro North Carolina Stake (Note: The Greensboro Stake was organized on September 13, 1961, then renamed the Greensboro North Carolina Stake on September 21, 1986.)	13 Sep 1961	North Carolina Charlotte	Raleigh North Carolina
Greenville North Carolina Stake (Note: The North Carolina Stake was organized on August 27, 1961, then later renamed the Kinston North Carolina Stake, and then the Greenville stake when it was divided in 2021.)	27 Aug 1961	North Carolina Raleigh	Raleigh North Carolina
Hickory North Carolina Stake	31 Oct 1982	North Carolina Charlotte	Columbia South Carolina
High Point North Carolina Stake	21 Nov 2010	North Carolina Charlotte	Raleigh North Carolina
Lake Norman North Carolina Stake	18 Sep 2022	North Carolina Charlotte	Columbia South Carolina
Mebane North Carolina Stake	26 Apr 2026	North Carolina Raleigh	Raleigh North Carolina
Morehead City North Carolina	19 Sep 2021	South Carolina Charleston	Raleigh North Carolina
Mount Airy North Carolina Stake	17 May 2026	North Carolina Charlotte	Raleigh North Carolina
Myrtle Beach South Carolina	5 Feb 1978	South Carolina Charleston	Columbia South Carolina
Raleigh North Carolina South Stake	8 Nov 2015	North Carolina Raleigh	Raleigh North Carolina
Raleigh North Carolina East Stake	31 May 2026	North Carolina Raleigh	Raleigh North Carolina
Raleigh North Carolina West Stake (Note: The Raleigh Stake was organized on December 9, 1962, then renamed the Raleigh North Carolina Stake in the 1970s, then renamed the Raleigh North Carolina West stake on May 31, 2026.)	9 Dec 1962	North Carolina Raleigh	Raleigh North Carolina
Sandhills North Carolina Stake	19 Sep 2004	North Carolina Raleigh	Raleigh North Carolina
Wake Forest North Carolina Stake (Note: The Wake Forest North Carolina Stake was organized on 19 March 2023 from units that had previously existed in the Raleigh North Carolina Stake and the Raleigh North Carolina South Stake.)	19 March 2023	North Carolina Raleigh	Raleigh North Carolina
Wilmington North Carolina Stake (Note: The Wilmington Stake was organized on May 21, 1972, then later renamed the Wilmington North Carolina Stake.)	21 May 1972	South Carolina Charleston	Raleigh North Carolina
Winston-Salem North Carolina Stake (Note: The Statesville North Carolina Stake was organized on November 20, 1977, then renamed the Winston-Salem North Carolina Stake on November 25, 1979.)	20 Nov 1977	North Carolina Charlotte	Raleigh North Carolina

== Temples ==
Temples in North Carolina

= Operating
= Under construction
= Announced

= Temporarily Closed

On December 18, 1999 the Raleigh North Carolina Temple was dedicated by church president Gordon B. Hinckley. On April 2, 2023, the Charlotte North Carolina Temple was announced by church president Russell M. Nelson.

68. Raleigh North Carolina Temple; Official website; News & images	
Location: Announced: Groundbreaking: Dedicated: Rededicated: Size: Style:	Apex, North Carolina, United States; September 3, 1998 by Gordon B. Hinckley; February 6, 1999 by Loren C. Dunn; December 18, 1999 by Gordon B. Hinckley; October 13, 2019 by M. Russell Ballard; 12,864 sq ft (1,195.1 m^{2}) on a 3.17-acre (1.28 ha) site Classic modern, single-spire design - designed by Dan Dills - Architect: Dills and Ainscuff. Contractor: Walbridge Aldinger.
322. Charlotte North Carolina Temple (Site announced); Official website; News & images	
Location: Announced: Size:	Weddington, North Carolina, United States; 2 April 2023 by Russell M. Nelson; 37,000 sq ft (3,400 m^{2}) on a 7.7-acre (3.1 ha) site

== See also ==
- The Church of Jesus Christ of Latter-day Saints membership statistics (United States)
- North Carolina: Religion
