= John Longden (disambiguation) =

John Longden (1900–1971) was an English film actor.

John Longden or Johnny Longden may also refer to:

- John Longden (Mormon) (1898–1969), English-born American leader in The Church of Jesus Christ of Latter-day Saints
- Johnny Longden (1907–2003), English-born American jockey
