= Stephen L. Chipman =

American politician

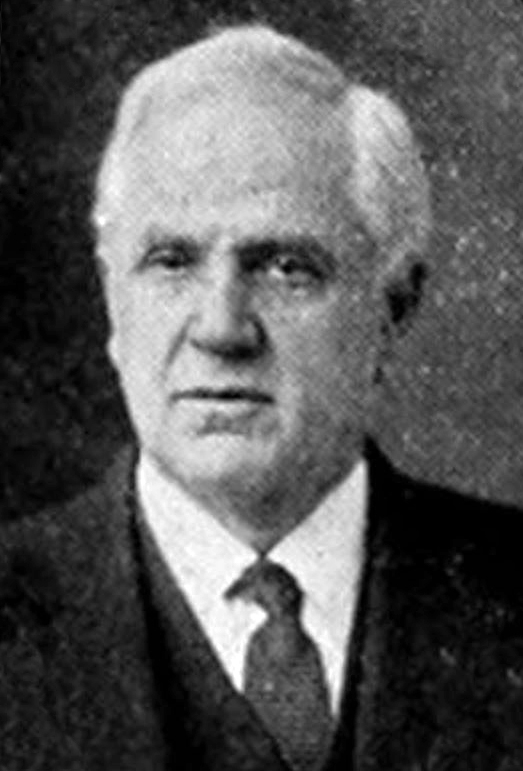
Stephan L. Chipman 1922

Stephen L. Chipman (1864–1945) was a member of the Utah State Legislature in 1903 and a leader in the Church of Jesus Christ of Latter-day Saints (LDS Church) in Utah County. He was also the first president of the Salt Lake Temple who was not also an apostle in the LDS Church.

== Biography ==
Chipman studied at Brigham Young Academy (the predecessor of Brigham Young University (BYU)) as a youth. From 1885 to 1887 he served as a Mormon missionary in the Southern States Mission of the LDS Church, spending most of his time as a missionary in North Carolina, Tennessee and Virginia. In 1885, before he left on his mission, Chipman had married Sine Nielsen. They eventually became the parents of seven children.

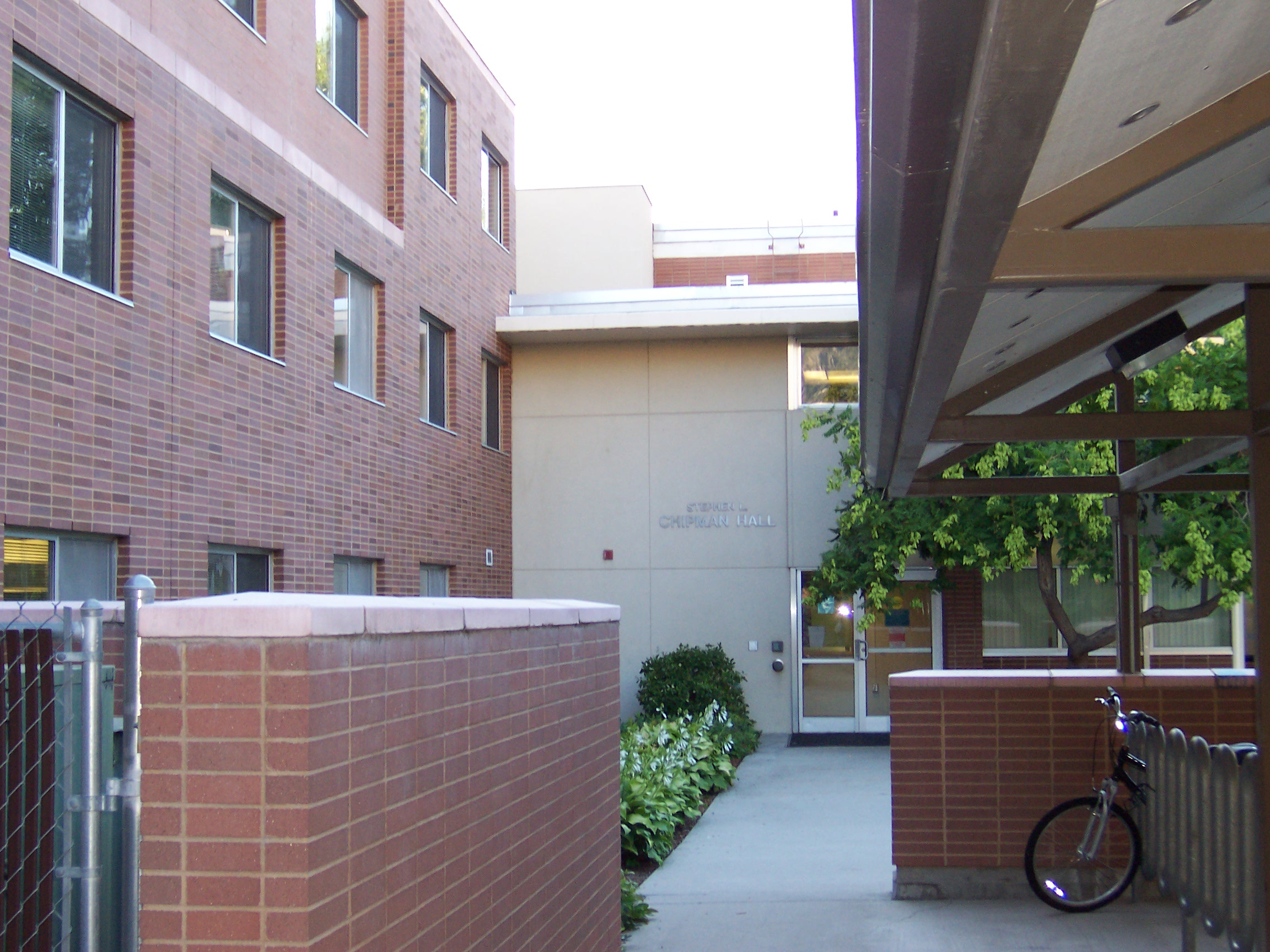
Chipman Hall at BYU

Chipman at various times served as a member of the city council of American Fork, Utah, a member of the Utah County Commission, and in 1903 began serving in the Utah State Legislature. Chipman was primarily involved in mercantile pursuits, for many years being the manager of the Chipman Mercantile Institution in American Fork. He also held several positions in the LDS Church's Sunday School, was a counselor to a ward bishop, and was a member of the high council of the Utah Stake (named such because at that time it took in all of Utah County).

When the Utah Stake was split into three stakes in 1901, Chipman was made the president of the new Alpine Stake. This stake included all of Utah County north of Provo. Despite its name, this stake was headquartered in American Fork, and not in Alpine, Utah, although the latter town was within the stake's boundaries. Over the years this stake has been divided into about 50 stakes.

In 1938, Chipman was called as president of the Salt Lake Temple. He succeeded apostle George F. Richards in this position. The four men who had served in this position prior to Chipman had all been apostles at the time of their service. Chipman served as president of the Salt Lake Temple until 1945, when he was succeeded by apostle Joseph Fielding Smith.

One of the Helaman Halls at BYU is named after Chipman.
