= St. Paul Minnesota Temple =

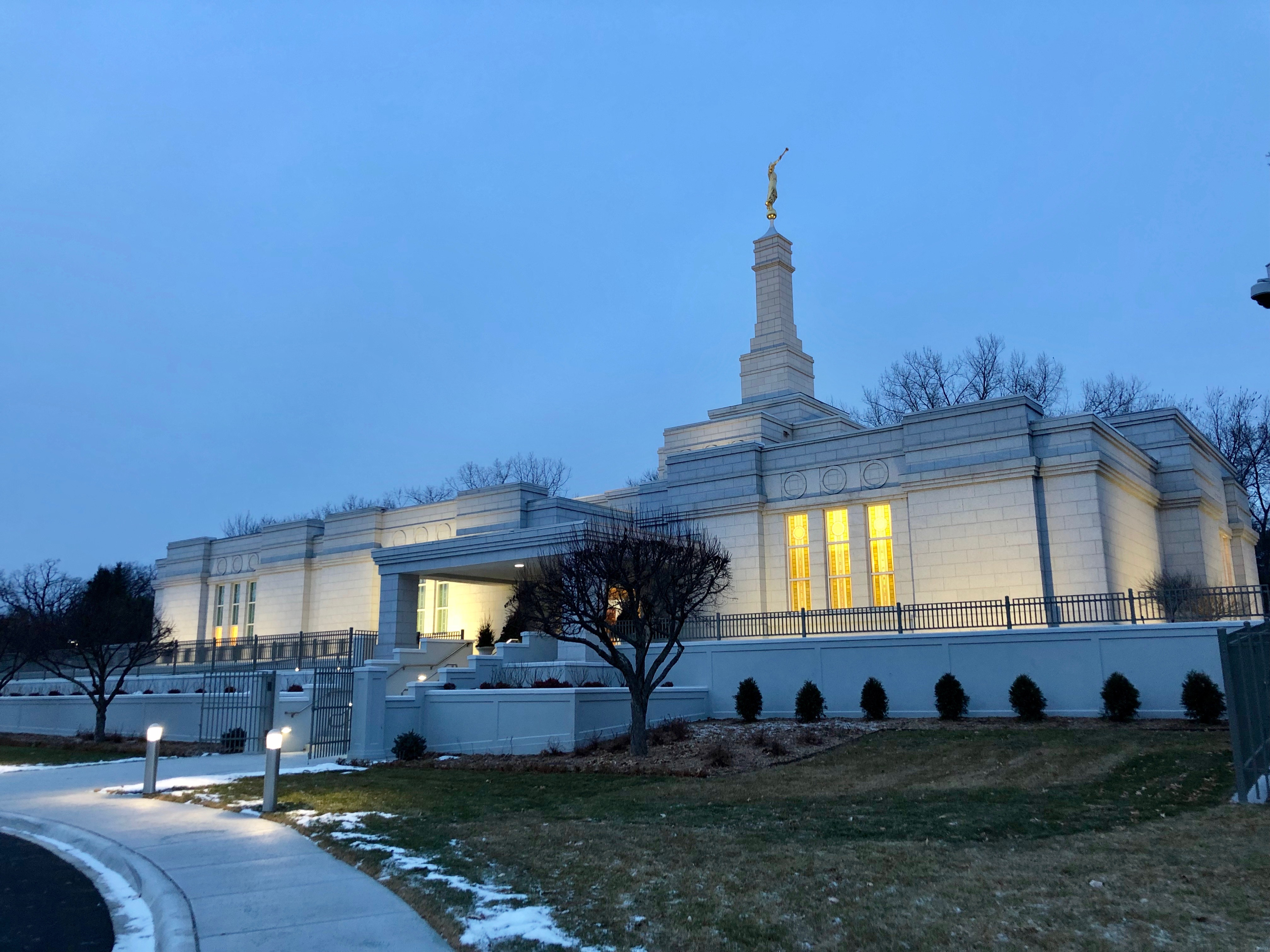
- Interactive map of St. Paul Minnesota Temple
- Number: 69
- Dedication: January 9, 2000, by Gordon B. Hinckley
- Site: 7.5 acres (3.0 ha)
- Floor area: 10,700 ft^{2} (990 m^{2})
- Height: 71 ft (22 m)
- Official website • News & images

Church chronology
| ← Raleigh North Carolina Temple | St. Paul Minnesota Temple | → Kona Hawaii Temple |

Additional information
- Announced: July 29, 1998, by Gordon B. Hinckley
- Groundbreaking: September 26, 1998, by Hugh W. Pinnock
- Open house: December 18–31, 1999
- Current president: Terrance Lee Sullivan
- Designed by: Ed Kodet, Jr. and Church A&E Services
- Location: Oakdale, Minnesota, United States
- Coordinates: 44°58′48.93959″N 92°57′54.71639″W
- Exterior finish: Light gray granite veneer
- Design: Classic modern, single-spire design
- Baptistries: 1
- Ordinance rooms: 2 (two-stage progressive)
- Sealing rooms: 2

The St. Paul Minnesota Temple is the 69th operating temple of the Church of Jesus Christ of Latter-day Saints (LDS Church). The intent to build the temple was announced on July 29, 1998, in a letter from the First Presidency to local church leaders. It is located in Oakdale, Minnesota, United States, a suburb of St. Paul, and is the church's first temple in the state.

The temple site also includes a stake center, a meetinghouse for church members. The temple is on a wooded 7.5-acre (3.0 ha) site. Designed by Ed Kodet, Jr., of Kodet Architect Group Ltd., the building has a single spire and is covered with a light gray granite veneer. A groundbreaking ceremony, to signify the beginning of construction, was held on September 26, 1998, conducted by Hugh W. Pinnock, president of the North America Central Area.

== History ==
The temple was announced in August 1998, with a groundbreaking ceremony held on September 26, 1998. Construction continued over the following year, with the angel Moroni statue placed on the spire on September 25, 1999. After construction was completed, a public open house was held from December 18 to 31, 1999, with over 27,000 people visiting the temple. LDS Church president Gordon B. Hinckley dedicated the St. Paul Minnesota Temple on January 9, 2000, the first dedicated that year.

The temple received minor damage on September 10, 2008 in a fire that inspectors believe was arson.

In 2020, like all the church's others, the St. Paul Minnesota Temple was closed for a time in response to the COVID-19 pandemic.

== Design and architecture ==
The building uses a classic modern architectural style. Designed by Ed Kodet, Jr. of Kodet Architect Group Ltd., its architecture reflects both the cultural heritage of Minnesota and its spiritual significance to the church.

The temple is on a heavily wooded 7.5-acre plot. The structure was constructed with light gray granite veneer.

The temple includes two instruction rooms, two sealing rooms, and a baptistry, each designed for ceremonial use.

The design uses elements representing Latter-day Saint symbolism, to provide deeper spiritual meaning to its appearance and function. Symbolism is important to church members and includes the statue of the angel Moroni on its steeple to represent “the restoration of the gospel of Jesus Christ.”

== Temple presidents ==
The church's temples are directed by a temple president and matron, each serving for a term of three years. The president and matron oversee the administration of temple operations and provide guidance and training for both temple patrons and staff.

Serving from 2000 to 2004, the first president was Kayland E. Call, with Virjean M. Call as matron. As of 2025, Robert L. Foote is the president, with Kally R. Foote serving as matron.

== Admittance ==
On November 27, 1999, the church announced the public open house that was held from December 18 to 31, 1999 (excluding Sundays). The temple was dedicated by Gordon B. Hinckley on January 9, 2000, in four sessions.

Like all the church's temples, it is not used for Sunday worship services. To members of the church, temples are regarded as sacred houses of the Lord. Once dedicated, only church members with a current temple recommend can enter for worship.

== See also ==
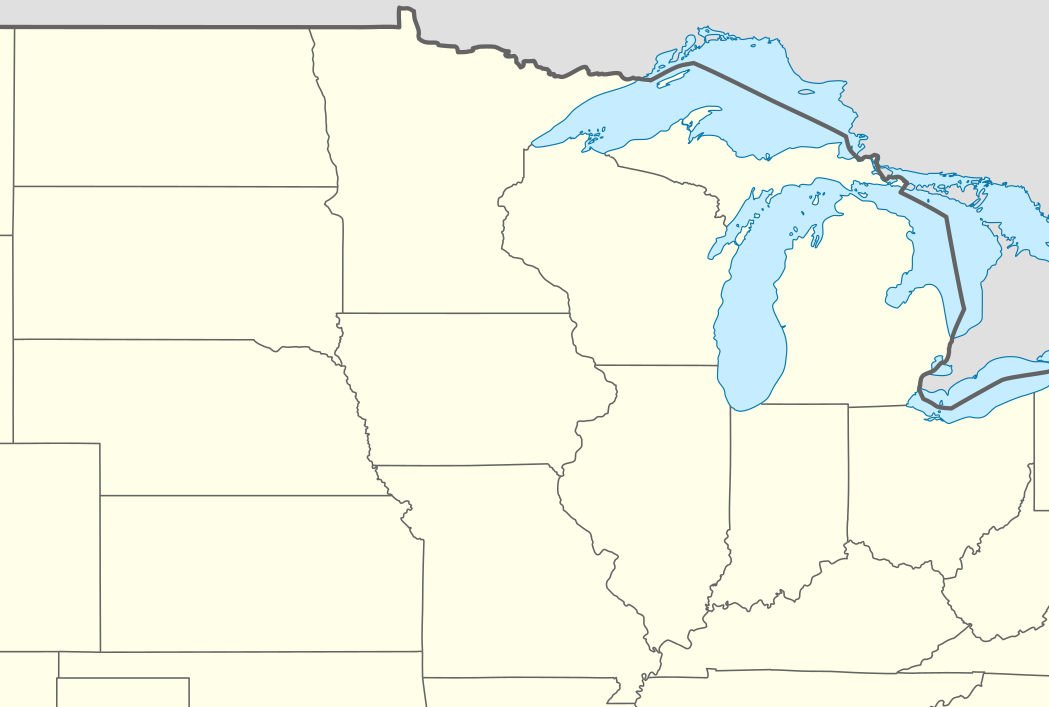
Temples in the United States Midwest
- = Operating
- = Under construction
- = Announced
- = Closed for renovation
- Comparison of temples of The Church of Jesus Christ of Latter-day Saints
- List of temples of The Church of Jesus Christ of Latter-day Saints
- List of temples of The Church of Jesus Christ of Latter-day Saints by geographic region
- Temple architecture (Latter-day Saints)

== Additional reading ==
- Kruckenberg, Janet (February 20, 1999), "The announcements of new holy edifices bring joy and tears", Church News
- "Open house, dedication dates announced for temples", Church News, November 27, 1999
- "First temple in the year 2000", Church News, January 15, 2000
- Kruckenberg, Janet (January 15, 2000), "Community assists with temple open house", Church News
- "ST. PAUL MINNESOTA: 'It is thy house, a place of thy holiness'", Church News, January 15, 2000
- "Facts and Figures: St. Paul Minnesota Temple", Church News, January 15, 2000
