= List of Brigham Young University residence halls =

This is a list of residential buildings at Brigham Young University which includes residential halls, dining facilities, housing area offices, laundry facilities, and other buildings directly connected with the residence halls. Residential buildings at Brigham Young University include three single-student residence hall centers, a foreign language student residence facility, and married-student housing at Wymount Terrace.

== Language Immersion Student Residence ==
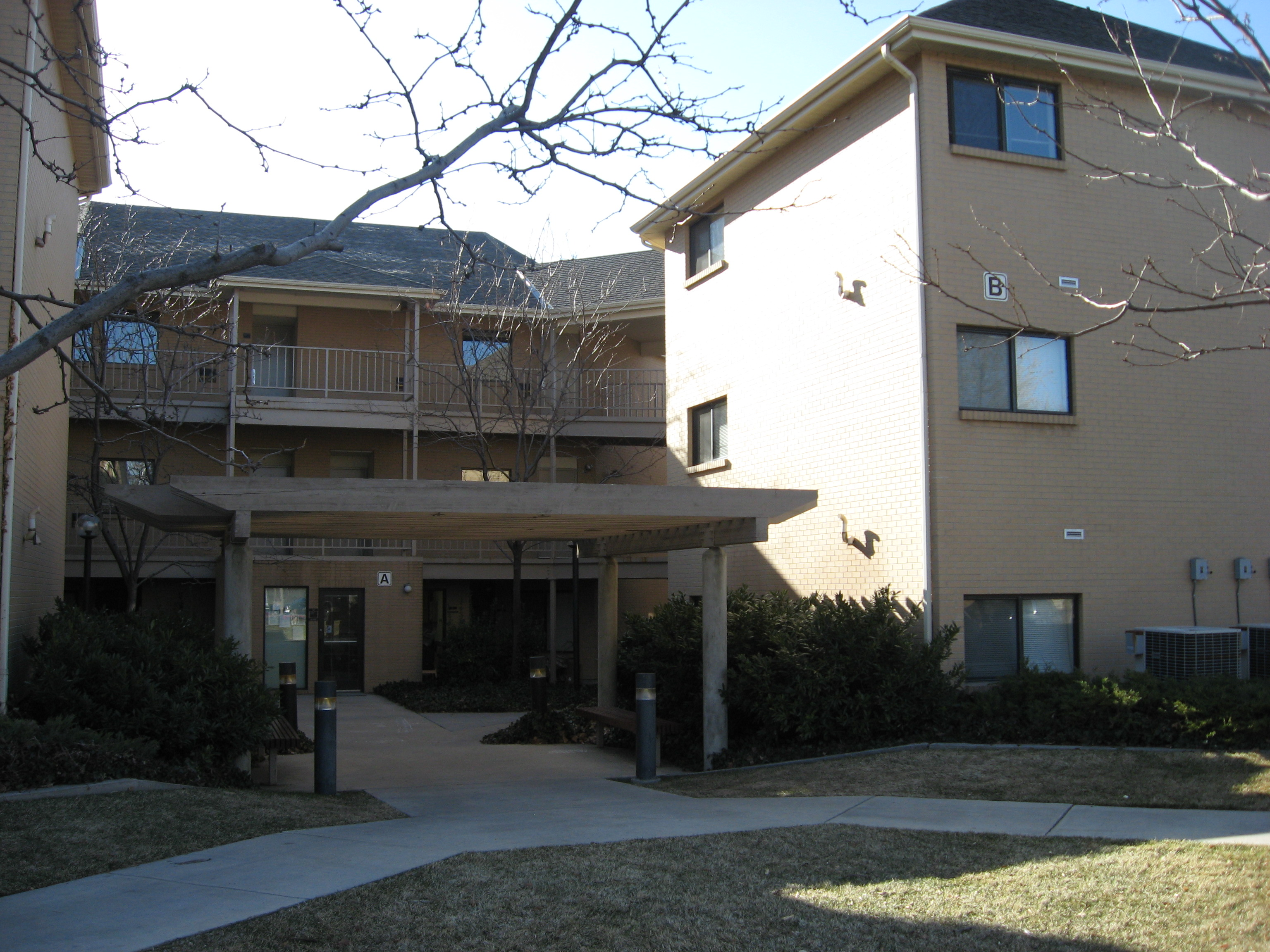
Language Immersion Student Residence at BYU

Brigham Young University's Language Immersion Student Residence (LISR) program was established in 1978 as a three-house off-campus residence center dedicated to the study of Russian and Italian. Due to the success of these houses, the program expanded from three houses to one specially designed complex in 1991. Each apartment houses 6 students: 5 students who are studying the same language and a native speaker. Each student agrees to only speak the apartment's assigned language during the school year while in the apartment.

Today the LISR consists of five buildings- four outer buildings with three floors each. These contain all of the male and female apartments for the program. The central building has rooms used for student activities, dinners, and Sunday church meetings. The on-campus complex consists of 25 individual apartments for men and women learning eleven different languages (depending on demand): Hebrew, Chinese, French, German, Italian, Japanese, Portuguese, Russian, Korean, and Spanish.

== Helaman Halls ==
- 40°15′8″N 111°39′11″W

Helaman Halls, named after one of the Book of Mormon heroes of the Church of Jesus Christ of Latter-day Saints, was first opened for use in the Fall of 1958. The initial on-campus complex consisted of five residence halls, a central dining building, and an administration building. Construction costs were $5,300,000, and when completed the complex initially housed 1170 male students. The residence buildings were named after prominent LDS individuals and/or families, including the Hinckley Family, Stephen L. Chipman, David John, Thomas N. Taylor, and Walter Stover.

The dining building was christened the George Q. Cannon Building and at the time could accommodate 1,800 people. In addition, both a pool and a "recreation field," which included eight tennis courts and four softball fields, were completed for the use of residents. Two more residence buildings were already under construction when the completion of the original Helaman Halls Complex was announced on September 18, 1958. The two new buildings were opened for use in September 1959, and housed 234 women each, bringing the total occupancy number of the complex to 1638. In 1959, the semester rent for Helaman halls was approximately $23 per term. Another building was added in 1970, and a new hall was built in 2010.

From 1991 to 2003, buildings at Helaman Halls underwent a 12-year renovations project so that each room would have a sink and vanity. Today, Helaman Halls has a total of nine residence buildings. with five buildings for women and four buildings for men. The Residence Halls are located on the northwest corner of campus. Living style consists of two students per room, with 22 rooms on each floor, with six floors (in three stories) per building. Helaman Halls currently has housing for just over 2,100 students. There are basic kitchen facilities in the basement lobby of each hall, but residents are required to purchase a meal plan. The majority of resident meals are eaten in the area central building- the Cannon Center. Because of its close proximity to the athletic facilities and all-you-can-eat dining, many Freshman athletes choose to live in Helaman Halls.

Notable individuals who lived at Helaman Halls include Mike Leach, Vai Sikahema, and Alema Harrington.

Building	Abbr.	Image	Yr. Occ.	Notes
Cannon (George Q.) Center	CANC Center		1958 (original); 2008 (current)	Named after George Q. Cannon, the Cannon Center acts as a central building for Helaman Halls residents, providing areas for activities, food services, meeting rooms, and maintenance services. Besides this, The Commons at the Cannon Center provides meal services for the residents of Helaman halls, and off-campus students; it serves as the main cafeteria for BYU since the 2008 closing of the Morris Center. Construction on the first Cannon Center began in 1957. The Cannon Center offers a variety of international foods, grilled options, and traditional meals. The Commons operates under a zero-food waste policy: food scraps are used to make fertilizers and used oil is converted to biodiesel.
Helaman Halls (B) Hinckley Hall	HLB		1958	Named after Ira N. Hinckley, the grandfather of the late President of The Church of Jesus Christ of Latter-day Saints Gordon B. Hinckley.
Helaman Halls (C) Chipman (Steven L.) Hall	HLC		1958	Named for Stephen L. Chipman, Mormon religious leader in north Utah County and member of the BYU Board of Trustees for over 40 years.
Helaman Halls (D) John (David) Hall	HLD		1958	Named after David John, father-in-law of Benjamin Cluff (third president of Brigham Young University) and vice-president of the Brigham Young Academy and Brigham Young University Board of Trustees.
Helaman Halls (E) Taylor (Thomas N.) Hall	HLE		1958	Named after Thomas N. Taylor, vice president of the Board of Trustees at the university. He oversaw fundraising efforts to finish paying for the Maeser Building.
Helaman Halls (F) Stover (Walter F.) Hall	HLF		1958	Named after Walter F. Stover who donated all the mattresses and box springs for Helaman Halls. Stover was a native of Germany and served as president of the East German mission immediately after World War II. He also served on the General Church Welfare Committee of The Church of Jesus Christ of Latter-day Saints.
Helaman Halls (G) Budge (William) Hall	HLG		1959	Named for William Budge, who was the missionary who helped convert Karl G. Maeser.
Helaman Halls (H) Merrill (Marriner Wood) Hall	HLH		1959	Named after LDS apostle Marriner W. Merrill.
Helaman Halls (I) May (Jean Fossum) Hall	HLI		1970	Named after Jean Fossum May (1906–1969), the head resident of Stover Hall for the last 10 years of her life. May had served a mission for the LDS Church when she was a little more than 20 years old. She greatly encouraged residents in her hall to serve missions and faithfully corresponded with them while they were on missions.
Helaman Halls (J) "Building 9"	HLJ		2010	This facility lacks a basement kitchenette that the other residencies have.

== Heritage Halls ==
- 40°15′5″N 111°38′40″W

Heritage Halls were originally built in 1953. They were the oldest dorms on campus until they were torn down (see Previous Residential Facilities below) and replaced by the new Heritage Halls buildings. In order to make room for the new Heritage Halls buildings, the Deseret Towers "DT" apartment complex was also torn down from 2006 to 2008, and construction on the new buildings at the Heritage complex began in 2011.

Today, Heritage Halls is a complex of dorms that consists of 14 buildings, located on the East side of campus. In the summer of 2017, work was completed on a new central building and one additional dorm building, bringing the total capacity to about 2,750 students. Two additional dorm buildings are currently under construction.

The living arrangements in Heritage Halls are similar to those of an apartment. Students share a kitchen and a common area. Each of the L-shaped buildings houses about 210 students. They are 4 stories high and feature East Coast classic design. Activity rooms on each floor have pictures with Church history themes and have floor-to-ceiling windows that offer views of the surrounding area. The individual units feature full kitchens, bedrooms with individualized lighting systems, and hallway vanities.

The buildings in the Heritage Halls complex are as follows:

Building	Abbr.	Image	Yr. Occ.	Notes	References
Heritage Halls Central Building	HR01	Photograph of the Central Building in Heritage Halls.	2017	The Central Building features study rooms that students can sign up to use. It also includes a ballroom and small kitchen that can host student activities and ward groups.	
Heritage Halls 2	HR02	Photograph of Building 2 (formerly 7) in Heritage Halls.	2015		
Heritage Halls 3	HR03	Photograph of Building 3 (formerly 9) in Heritage Halls.	2014		
Heritage Halls 4	HR04	Photograph of Building 4 (formerly 10) in Heritage Halls.	2014		
Heritage Halls 5	HR05	Photograph of Building 5 (formerly 8) in Heritage Halls.	2015		
Heritage Halls 6	HR06	Photograph of Building 6 in Heritage Halls.	2017		
Heritage Halls 7	HR07	Photograph of Building 7 (formerly 14) in Heritage Halls.	2015		
Heritage Halls 8	HR08	Photograph of Building 8 (formerly 15) in Heritage Halls.	2015		
Heritage Halls 9	HR09	Photograph of Building 9 (formerly 25) in Heritage Halls.	2011		
Heritage Halls 10	HR10	Photograph of Building 10 (formerly 26) in Heritage Halls.	2012		
Heritage Halls 11	HR11	Photograph of Building 11 (formerly 27) in Heritage Halls.	2012		
Heritage Halls 12	HR12	Photograph of Building 12 (formerly 28) in Heritage Halls.	2011		
Heritage Halls 13	HR13		2020		
Heritage Halls 14	HR14		2020		
Heritage Halls 15	HR15	Photograph of Building 15 (formerly 30) in Heritage Halls.	2013		
Heritage Halls 16	HR16	Photograph of Building 16 (formerly 29) in Heritage Halls.	2013		

== Wymount Terrace ==
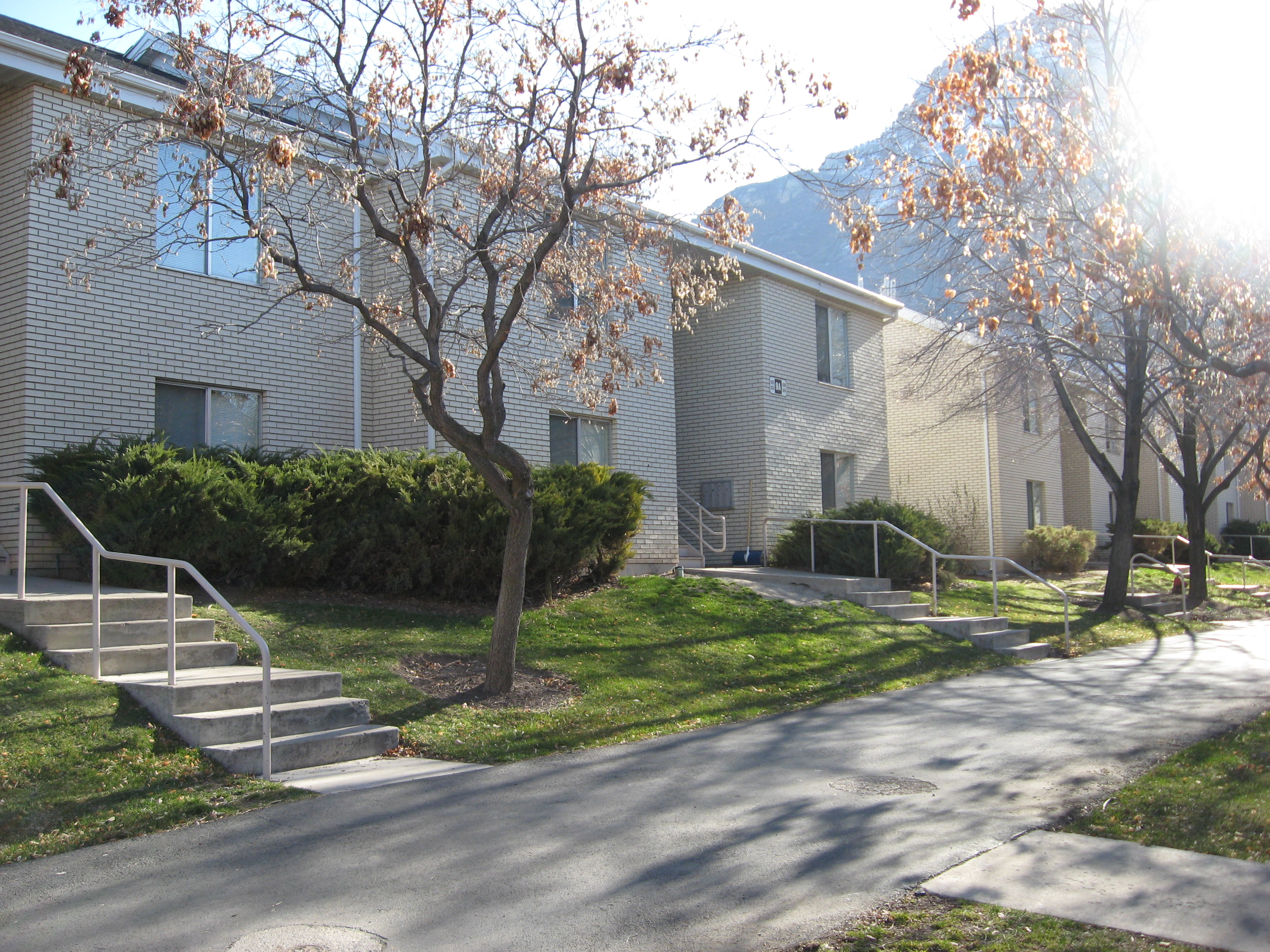
Wymount Terrace Student Family Housing.

Wymount Terrace is the family housing unit for married students and is located on the northeast side of campus. It consists of South Wymount (24 three-story apartment buildings) and North Wymount (48 two-story apartment buildings). The buildings are arranged in quadrangles that enclose lawn and playground areas. It is informally referred to as “the rabbit pen” by some students. This is possibly in reference to how fast families grow here. Wymount also has playground areas for children. Construction on the complex began in August 1961 by Tolboe and Harlin Construction Company. Each building has 462 apartments that range from one to three bedrooms. The complex sits on 27 acres.

Building	Abbr.	Yr. Occ.	Notes
Wymount Terrace Administration Building	WOAB	1962	
Wymount Terrace Laundry Buildings 1-5	W0L1, W0L2, W0L3, W0L4, W0L5	1962 (W0L1, W0L2, W0L3); 1979 (W0L4); 1985 (W0L5)	Each laundromat has standard and double-load washers and dryers along with two soak sinks. Machines can only be operated with a BYU ID card.
Wymount Terrace Multi-Purpose Center	W0MP	1980	This is where many of the wards consisting of Wymont residents hold church meetings.
Wymount Terrace (W01A) Kimball, (Sarah M.)	W01A	1962	Named for Sarah M. Kimball.
Wymount Terrace (W01B) Reynolds, (Alice Louise)	W01B	1962	Alice Louise Reynolds was a professor of English at BYU during the early 20th century.
Wymount Terrace (W01C) Smith (Julina Lambson)	W01C	1962	Julina Lambson Smith was a wife of Joseph F. Smith and the mother of Joseph Fielding Smith.
Wymount Terrace (W02A) Bennion (Samuel O.)	W02A	1962	Named for Samuel O. Bennion.
Wymount Terrace (W02B) Ivins (Antoine R.)	W02B	1962	Named for Antoine R. Ivins.
Wymount Terrace (W02C) Kimball (J. Golden)	W02C	1962	Named for J. Golden Kimball.
Wymount Terrace (W02D) Roberts (Brigham H.)	W02D	1962	Named for B. H. Roberts.
Wymount Terrace (W03A) Williams (Helen Spencer)	W03A	1963	Helen Spencer Williams, often called Helen S. Williams, was the first counselor in the YWMIA General Presidency of the Church of Jesus Christ of Latter-day Saints from 1937-1944. She was also a writer and columnists, writing for the Deseret News, the Improvement Era and the Relief Society Magazine.
Wymount Terrace (W04A) Nibley (Charles W.)	W04A	1963	Named for Charles W. Nibley.
Wymount Terrace (W04B) Reynolds (George)	W04B	1963	Named for Geoerge Reynolds.
Wymount Terrace (W04C) Wirthlin (Joseph L.)	W04C	1963	Named for Joseph L. Wirthlin.
Wymount Terrace (W04D) Young (Levi Edgar)	W04D	1963	Named for Levi Edgar Young.
Wymount Terrace (W05A) Clayton (William)	W05A	1963	Named for LDS hymnwriter William Clayton.
Wymount Terrace (W05B) Mcclellan (John J.)	W05B	1963	Named for John J. McClellan.
Wymount Terrace (W05C) Pratt (Orson)	W05C	1963	Named for Orson Pratt.
Wymount Terrace (W05D) Stephens (Evan)	W05D	1963	Named for former Mormon Tabernacle Choir director Evan Stephens.
Wymount Terrace (W06A) Dixon (Henry Aldous)	W06A	1963	Named for Henry Aldous Dixon a prominent Utah educator and politician.
Wymount Terrace (W06B) Hamblin (Jacob)	W06B	1963	Named for Mormon missionary to the Native Americans Jacob Hamblin.
Wymount Terrace (W06C) Sutherland (George)	W06C	1963	One of very few buildings at BYU named for a non-Mormon, in this case Brigham Young Academy graduate and later United States Supreme Court justice George Sutherland.
Wymount Terrace (W06D) Swensen (John C.)	W06D	1963	Named for John C. Swensen, a BYU professor for 54 years.
Wymount Terrace (W07A) Critchlow, Jr. (William J.)	W07A	1962	Named for William J. Critchlow Jr., a prominent LDS leader in Ogden and later a General Authority as an Assistant to the Twelve.
Wymount Terrace (W07B) Longden (John)	W07B	1962	Named for John Longden.
Wymount Terrace (W07C) McKay (Thomas E.)	W07C	1962	Named for Thomas E. McKay, a brother of David O. McKay who also served as a general authority.
Wymount Terrace (W07D) Smith (Nicholas G.)	W07D	1962	Named for Nicholas G. Smith.
Wymount Terrace (W08-W11)	-	1979	
Wymount Terrace (W12-W13)	-	1982	
Wymount Terrace (W14-W15)	-	1985	
Wymount Terrace (W16-W17)	-	1992	

== Wyview Park ==
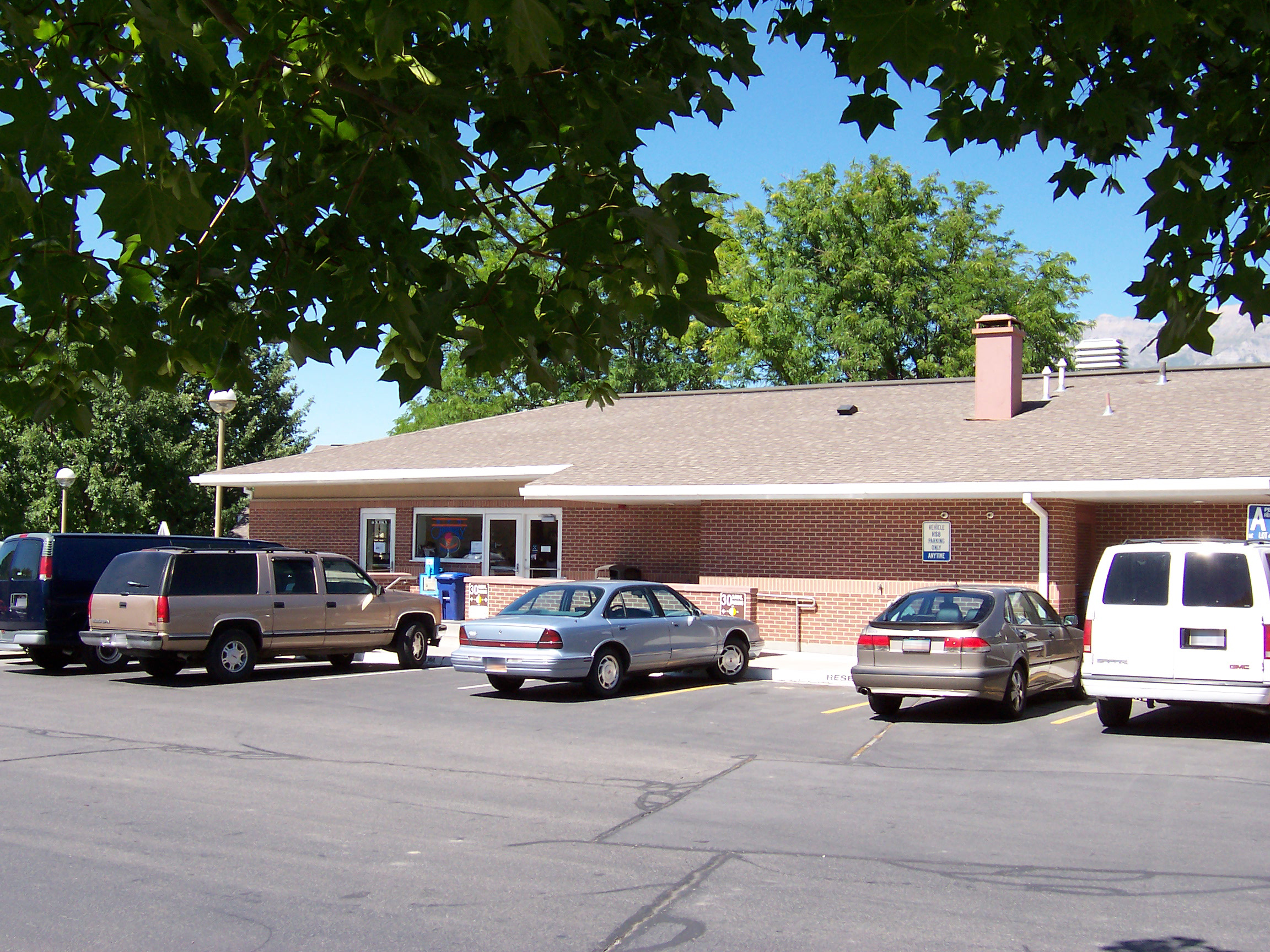
Wyview Park Central Building

Wyview Park is a living complex for married and single students at BYU. The university had purchased 150 mobile home units to provide housing for married students until Wyview Park was built. Wyview was dedicated by James E. Faust. When the complex opened in 1998, it had a waiting list of 900 applicants which grew to 1,800 within a few months.

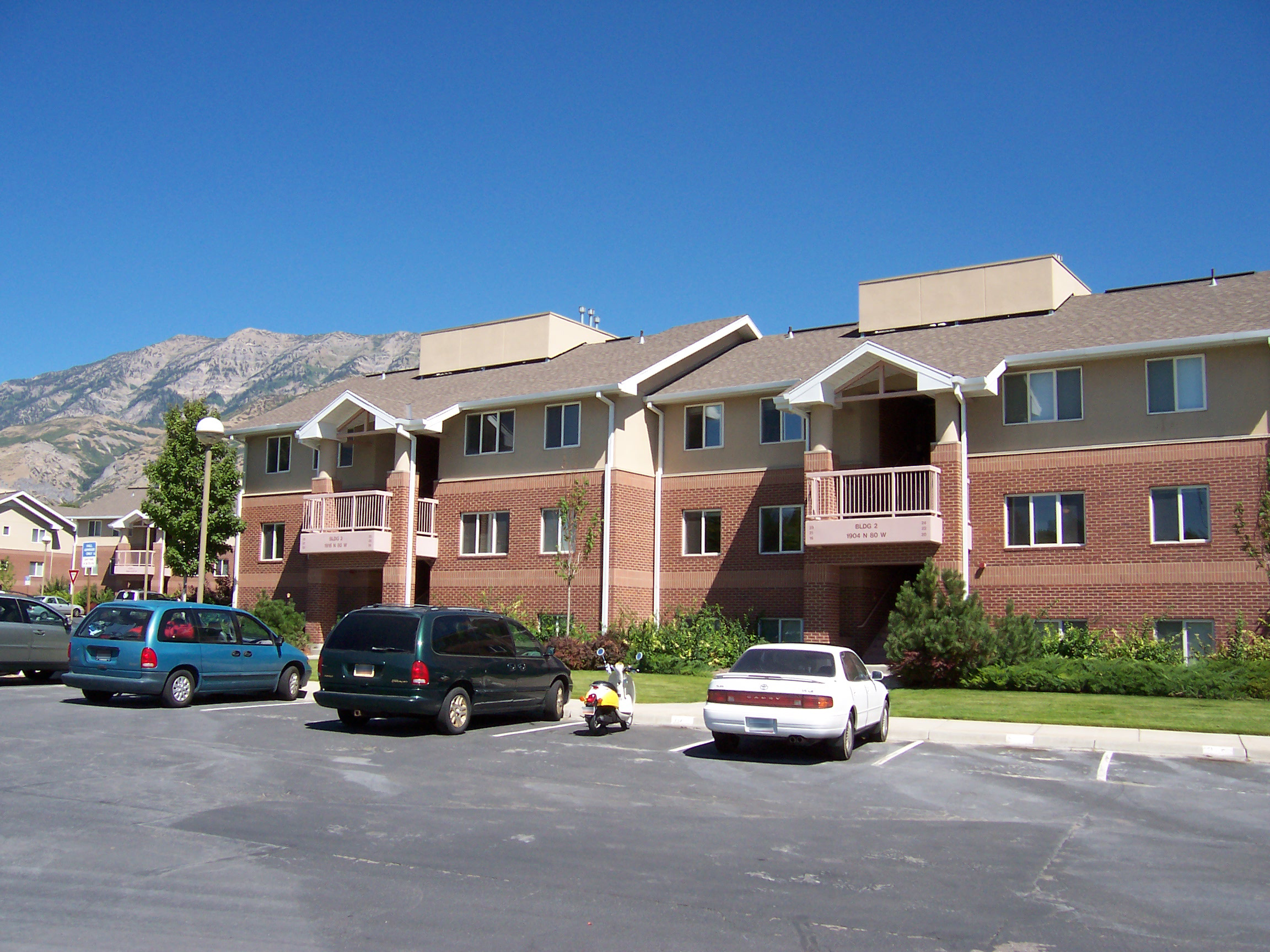
Wyview Park Building 2

The current complex includes 30 buildings which originally housed married student families, until the end of the summer of 2006, when the southern half of the residential park was converted into housing for singles and eventually the entire complex. In 2013 after the winter semester of school concluded, the northern portion of Wyview was converted into a makeshift Missionary Training Center (MTC) to help alleviate the overburdened Provo MTC just up the hill. As part of this temporary MTC complex, the LDS church also obtained a lease for the Raintree Apartments across the street to the west and both facilities are used together to house missionaries and their training activities. The complex now houses both married and single students.

== Previous Residential facilities ==
=== Allen Hall ===
One of the earliest student dormitories at BYU, Allen Hall, named for Ray Eugene Allen and his wife Inez Knight, was built in 1938. Originally it was a men's dormitory, but during World War II, a large influx of female students caused the university to make it a women's dorm. In 1962, the building ceased to be a student dormitory altogether, and was used as temporary housing for missionaries while the Church's Language Training Mission was under construction. The success of Allen Hall led to immediate plans for another dormitory, Amanda Knight Hall, named for the wife of Jesse Knight. This served as a home for female students until it was also turned over to the Language Training Mission.

=== BYA Boarding House ===
The BYA Boarding House was established in 1885 with Joseph B. Keeler as steward and Willard Done as presiding tutor. It had 24 residents in May 1886 but there is no record of it after that date.

=== Co-op Housing ===
In the years immediately after World War II BYU purchased several houses in Provo that it operated as co-operative residents before it was able to build resident halls on a large scale. Most of these houses were for female students.

=== Deseret Towers ===
In 1965, BYU completed construction of Deseret Towers. At the time it consisted of five halls, but a sixth was added in 1969 and the final in 1978. Each building was six stories and the whole complex housed over 2,000 students. Deseret Towers was dedicated in October 1970 by Ezra Taft Benson. The residential hall was referred to as "DT". In December 2006, V and W Hall were torn down because they didn't meet the electronic demands of students in the 21st century. After the winter semester the remaining buildings were used to hold conferences and did not serve as residential apartments anymore. They were demolished in 2008.

The following were halls at Deseret Towers:

- Ballard Hall (named after Melvin J. Ballard)
- Bennion Hall (named for Adam Samuel Bennion)
- Callis Hall (named for Charles A. Callis)
- Morris Center (named for George Q. Morris)
- Penrose Hall (named for Charles W. Penrose)
- Richards Hall (named for George Franklin Richards)
- Whitney Hall (named for Orson F. Whitney)

=== Old Heritage Halls ===
The original Heritage Halls complex was a twenty-four-building housing complex. Old Heritage Halls was completed in two stages: one stage of buildings were completed in 1953 and the other stage in 1956. The complex was dedicated on May 26, 1954. The halls received their collective name through a contest among residents. All of the separate buildings were named after notable Latter-day Saint women.

There were 24 individual living buildings. The Heritage Halls buildings were built for unmarried females, although later on males were allowed to be residents. At one point a "Homemaking Apartment" was located in Heritage Halls, where students in the Department of Home Economics and Management of the Home took turns living a low-budget lifestyle for two weeks at a time. Each of the buildings had ten units capable of housing six people each. This residential hall offered apartment-style living with kitchens included in each unit. In between the buildings there was a canal that was known as "the moat." Many students chose Old Heritage Halls due to its proximity to campus. The old residence halls began to be torn down gradually in 2005.

Building	Abbr.	Image	Yr. Occ.	Notes
Heritage Halls Central Building	HRCN		1983-2014	This building contain a computer lab and the administrative offices for the complex.
Heritage Halls (01) Bowen (Emma Lucy Gates) Hall	HR01		1953-2011	Named after Emma Lucy Gates Bowen. The school demolished Bowen Hall to make way for a new steam service tunnel between the Harris Fine Arts Center and 900 East.
Heritage Halls (02) Broadbent (Mima Murdock) Hall	HR02		1953-2015	Mima Melissa Murdock Broadbent (1879–1957) was Utah State Mother of the Year in 1948. Mima and her husband David A. Broadbent were the parents of 14 children, 12 of whom lived to maturity. Broadbent Hall was one of the last four of the original Heritage Halls to be demolished, in 2015.
Heritage Halls (03) Felt (Louie B.) Hall	HR03		1953-2015	Named after Louie B. Felt.
Heritage Halls (04) Fox (Ruth May) Hall	HR04		1953-2015	Named after Ruth May Fox.
Heritage Halls (05) Horne (Alice Merrill) Hall	HR05		1953-2014	Named for Alice Merrill Horne (1868–1948) who was a native of Fillmore, Utah and a prominent Utah artist.
Heritage Halls (06) Harris (Estella Spilsbury) Hall	HR06		1953-2015	Named after Estella Spilsbury Harris who was the wife of Franklin S. Harris and thus the longest-serving first lady of BYU.
Heritage Halls (07) Maeser (Anna Mieth) Hall	HR07		1953-2014	Named for Anna Mieth Maeser, wife of Karl G. Maeser, and thus first lady of what is now BYU from 1876–1892.
Heritage Halls (08) Penrose (Romania Pratt) Hall	HR08		1953-2014	Named for Romania B. Pratt Penrose, first female Utahn to get an MD and wife of Charles W. Penrose, who was a professor at BYU for a short time before becoming an LDS Apostle.
Heritage Halls (09) Rogers (Aurelia S.) Hall	HR09		1953-2012	Named after Aurelia Spencer Rogers, mother of the LDS Primary program for children and daughter of Orson Spencer, the first chancellor of what is today the University of Utah.
Heritage Halls (10) Richards (Alice Robinson) Hall	HR10		1953-2012	Named after Alice Robinson Richards, wife of Apostle George F. Richards and mother of apostle Legrand Richards, as well as 14 other children.
Heritage Halls (11) Shipp (Ellis Reynolds) Hall	HR11		1953-2012	Named after Ellis Reynolds Shipp.
Heritage Halls (12) Robinson (Louise Yates) Hall	HR12		1953-2012	Named for Louise Y. Robison.
Heritage Halls (13) Snow (Eliza R.) Hall	HR13		1953-2012	Named after Eliza R. Snow.
Heritage Halls (14) Smith (Lucy Mack) Hall	HR14		1953-2012	Named after Lucy Mack Smith.
Heritage Halls (15) Wells (Emmeline B.) Hall	HR15		1953-2012	Named after Emmeline B. Wells.
Heritage Halls (16) Smith (Mary Fielding) Hall	HR16		1953-2012	Named after Mary Fielding Smith.
Heritage Halls (17) Carroll (Elsie C.) Hall	HR17		1956-2014	Named after Elsie Chamberlain Carroll (1882–1967) who a BYU English professor and an author and poet, most of her works being published in LDS Church magazines.
Heritage Halls (18) Fugal (Lavina C.) Hall	HR18		1956-2013	Named after Lavina Christensen Fugal (1879–1969) who was American Mother of the Year in 1955. A graduate of Brigham Young Academy, Lavina taught school to help support her future husband, Jens Peter Fugal, while he was on an LDS mission in Denmark. The Fugals had eight children. She served in various LDS Auxiliary organization positions, was a member of the Farm Bureau, and served on the Utah County planning commission also for a time as head of the Pleasant Grove Board of Health.
Heritage Halls (19) Gates (Susa Young) Hall	HR19		1956-2013	Named after Susa Young Gates.
Heritage Halls (20) Kimball (Vilate M.) Hall	HR20		1956-2011	Named after Vilate M. Kimball, the first wife of Heber C. Kimball, Brigham Young's best friend and also first counselor to Brigham Young in the first presidency until Heber C. Kimball died.
Heritage Halls (21) Richards (Emily S.) Hall	HR21		1956-2013	Named after Emily Sophia Tanner Richards (1850–1929), the wife of Franklin S. Richards and a suffragist. She was a delegate for the Relief Society at the first International Council of Women. Emily served for many years on the Relief Society General Board. She and Franklin were the parents of six children.
Heritage Halls (22) Tingey (Martha H.) Hall	HR22		1956-2013	Named after Martha H. Tingey.
Heritage Halls (23) Whitney (Elizabeth Ann) Hall	HR23		1956-2013	Named for Elizabeth Ann Smith Whitney, the wife of Newel K. Whitney, the 2nd presiding bishop of the Church.
Heritage Halls (24) Young (Zina D. H.) Hall	HR24		1956-2014	Named after Zina D. H. Young.

=== Wymount Village ===
In 1946, during the postwar BYU growth, President McDonald purchased forty-eight buildings from a nearby Air Force station in order to house students. These buildings were called Wymount Village, and housed both married and single students until 1962. Wymount Village was replaced by Wymount Terrace in that year, intended solely for students with young families. The 24 building complex contains a total of 462 apartments of varying sizes.

=== Wyview Village ===
This was another set of housing units purchased from the Federal Government. It was 150 pre-fabricated homes intended for Mountain Home Air Force Base. The units were practically new, with new appliances and many had never been lived in. They were sold as surplus by the government in October 1956, moved to Provo early in 1957 and ready for occupation by August 1957. They were located north-east of the present site of the Marriott Center.
