= Ryde (disambiguation) =

Ryde may refer to:

== Places ==
- Ryde, British seaside town and civil parish
- City of Ryde, local government area in Sydney, Australia
- Ryde, New South Wales, suburb of Sydney, Australia
- Electoral district of Ryde, New South Wales, Australia
- Ryde, California, unincorporated community in Sacramento County, California, United States

== People ==
- Steven Ryde (born 1971), British actor, voice-over artist and producer
- Anne-Lie Rydé (born 1956), Swedish pop and rock singer

== Other ==
- PS Ryde, paddle steamer commissioned as a passenger ferry between mainland England and the Isle of Wight
- The Ryde, a shuttle bus system serving Brigham Young University in Provo, Utah, United States
