= David John (Mormon) =

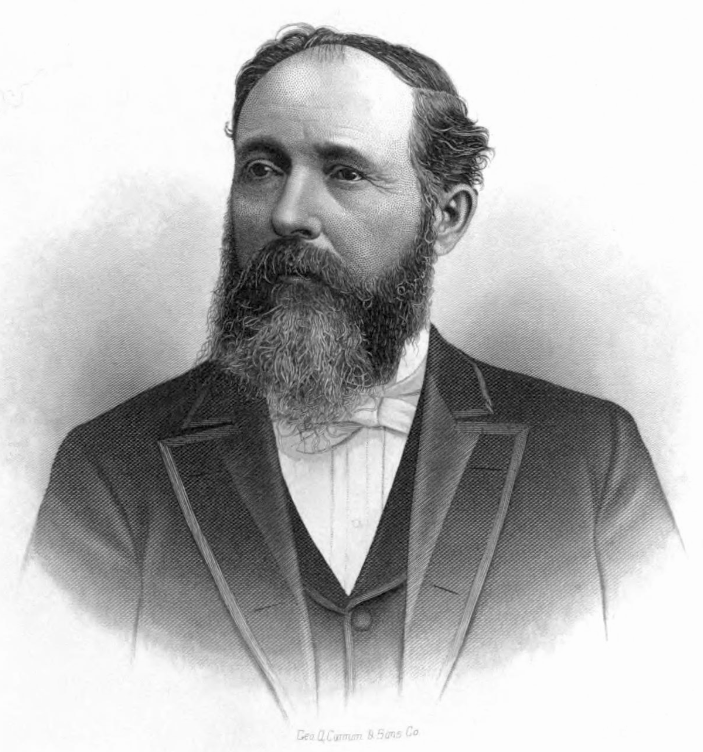

Vice President of the BYU board of trustees
- 1891 – 1908
- Called by: Joseph F. Smith

Personal details
- Born: 29 January 1833; Little Newcastle, Pembrokeshire, Wales, United Kingdom
- Died: 24 December 1908 (aged 75); Provo, Utah, United States
- Resting place: Provo City Cemetery; 40.2250°N 111.6444°W
- Alma mater: Baptist College, Haverfordwest, Pembrokeshire, Wales
- Spouse(s): Mary Wride, Jane Cree
- Children: 20
- Signature
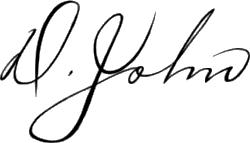

David John (29 January 1833 – 24 December 1908) was a leading figure in Utah at the dawn of the 20th century. He served as a stake president in the Church of Jesus Christ of Latter-day Saints (LDS Church) and a member of the Brigham Young University (BYU) board of trustees.

John was born in Little Newcastle, Pembrokeshire, Wales. He was raised in a Baptist family and studied for the ministry. He joined the LDS Church in 1847. His parents were so opposed to the Church at that time that, on the advice of Orson Pratt, John ended his association with it for a time and continued to study for the Baptist ministry.

In 1856 he returned to association with the LDS Church. He was rebaptized on 6 February 1856. John was ordained an elder on 29 March 1856 and in June began to serve as an LDS missionary in various parts of Wales. By December he was the president of the Flintshire Conference in which position he served a year. He also served as a counselor in the Presidency of the Welsh Mission from December 1857 to December 1858. In January 1859 he was reassigned to the Nottingham Conference in the British Mission. He also served as president here from that time until March 1860. He then served about a year as pastor of the "pastorate" which consisted of Nottingham and two other conferences, for a total of about 100 Branches. This is a position that has only really existed in mid-19th Century Britain in the history of the LDS Church. In modern usage if pastor is applied to any specific LDS position it would be to the bishops who preside over individual Wards.

John emigrated to Utah in 1861. In 1860 he had married Mary Wride in Cardiff. In 1862 John was called as a counselor in the bishopric of the Provo 3rd Ward. He served in the bishopric for 15 years. John was called as superintendent of the Utah Stake Sunday School in 1865 in which position he served until 1893. From 1877 to 1901 John was a counselor in the Utah Stake to first Abraham O. Smoot and then Edward Partridge, Jr. At this time the Utah stake covered all of Utah County. In 1883 he was ordained a bishop and appointed the regional presiding bishop of Utah Stake, overseeing the activities of the various bishops in Utah County in temporal matters. John was simultaneously regional presiding bishop and a counselor in the stake presidency and Stake Sunday School Superintendent. However, his position of regional presiding bishop was a paid full-time position, somewhat like various full-time positions in the Presiding Bishops office today. He also served another mission to Great Britain in the early 1870s.

At the start of his time in Utah John worked as a school teacher and then was trustee of the Provo district schools for 15 years. He was also a partner in the firm of Smoot and John, a lumber business he ran with Abraham O. Smoot.

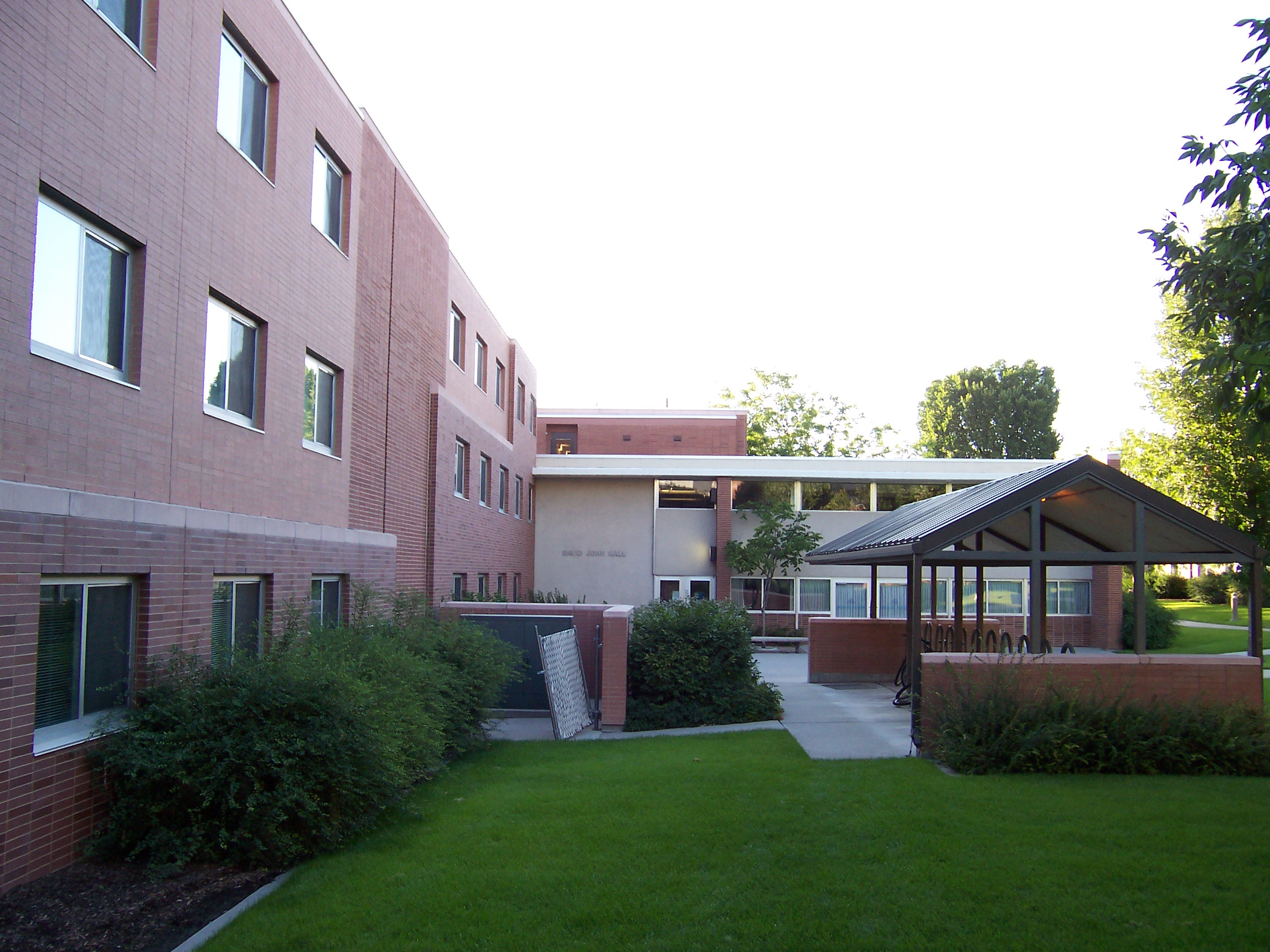
John (David) Hall, located at BYU

John married a second wife, Jane Cree, in 1865. He had nine children with Mary and 11 children with Jane. In 1887 he spent time in prison for violating the Edmunds Act.

Among John's children was Mary John who married Benjamin Cluff, who served as president of BYU during part of the time John was the vice president of the Board of Trustees.

John served as president of the stake from 1901-1908. At the time of his call as president the stake was divided, and reduced to Provo, Springville, Utah and the farm area that would later become part of Orem, Utah. He also served as vice president of the Brigham Young University Board of Trustees, with Joseph F. Smith, who was also president of the LDS Church as president, making John the senior member of the board who could devote a large amount of his time to its operations. John served on the Brigham Young Academy and then BYU board of trustees from 1891 to 1908.

David John wrote a diary that has been cited for historical purposes, including his comments on Utah receiving statehood.

One of Helaman Halls at BYU is named for David John.
