= Ernest L. Wilkinson Student Center =

Brigham Young University Ernest L. Wilkinson Student Center
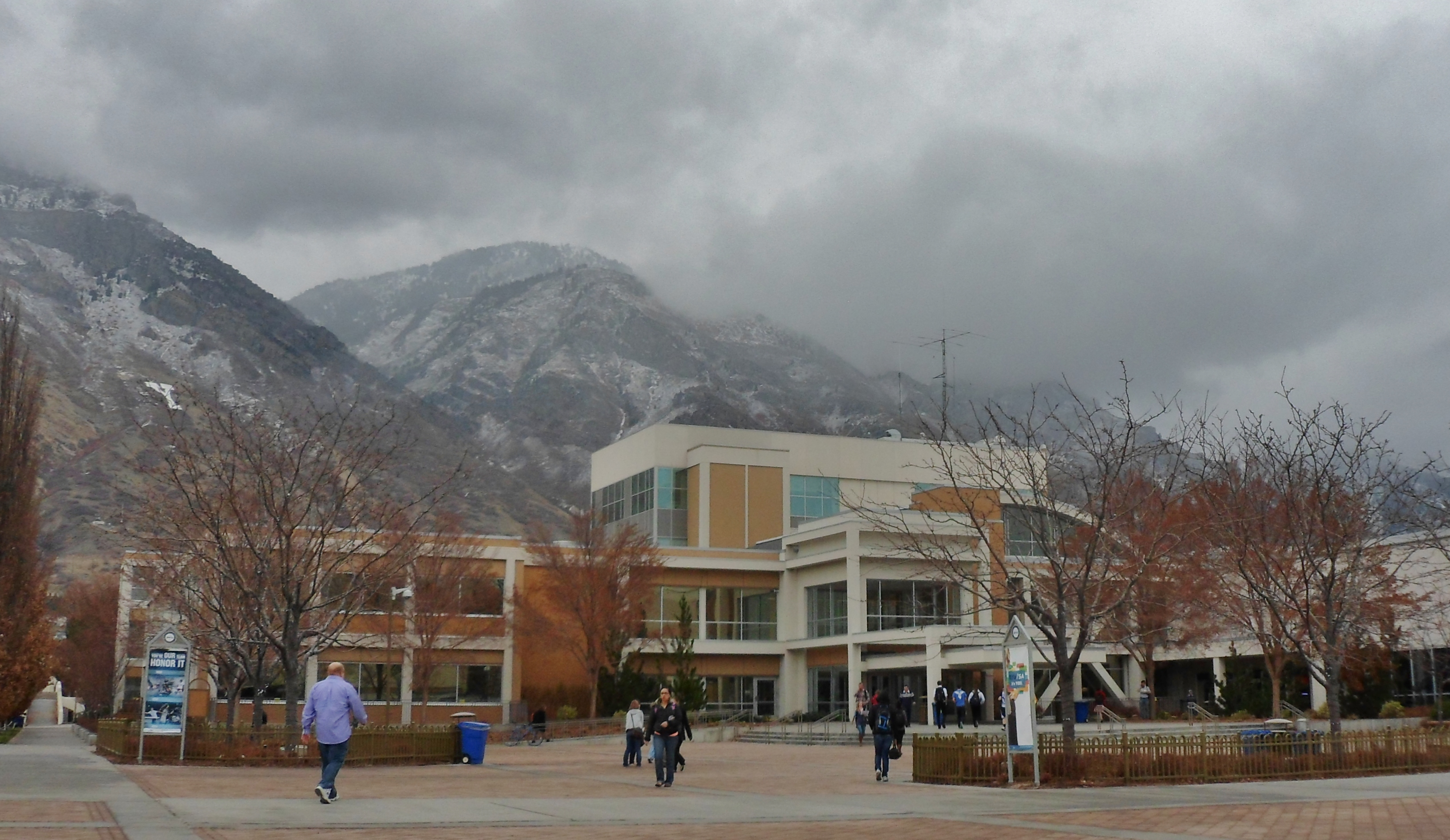
- The Wilkinson Student Center in Winter
- Alternative names: The Wilk

General information
- Type: Student union
- Completed: 1964
- Renovated: 1974

Technical details
- Floor count: 6
- Floor area: 287,539 square feet in 1964
- Lifts/elevators: 5

Website
- wilk.byu.edu

The Ernest L. Wilkinson Student Center (WSC) serves as the main student center on the Brigham Young University (BYU) campus. It was originally called the Ernest L. Wilkinson Center but was changed to its current name at its re-dedication by Gordon B. Hinckley in 1999 after the building had been extensively renovated. It is known by students as "The Wilk".

== History ==
The building, completed in 1964, was named for Ernest L. Wilkinson, sixth president of BYU (1951–1971). Planning for the center took 12 years, and 60 percent of the cost was paid by students. The BYU Bookstore takes up one corner of this building. Also in the building are food services, including a food court with franchise restaurants, a high-class restaurant taking up the sixth floor, BYU catering's central operations, and two other places to buy food not connected with any of the above.

The building also has conference rooms, two large ballrooms, a movie theatre, a full-service copy center, a post office, and a bowling alley. There is also a full-service salon, Studio1030 and a music venue/restaurant, The Wall. The Wall was opened in 2013 in the location that had previously been Outdoors Unlimited. The building also houses the Dean of Students Office, various counseling and conflict resolution offices, various other student services offices, and a computer lab.

Among specific offices housed in the WSC are the Center for Service and Learning, Women's Services and Resources, the BYU Career and Counseling Center, BYU Campus Scheduling, BYU EMS, BYU Student Employment, the BYU Honor Code Office, Lost and Found, the BYU Information Center (which also issues bus passes), and the Student Honor Association. The BYU Faculty Center is also located in the WSC. The counseling center was started in 1946 under BYU president Howard S. McDonald, and moved to the WSC when the building was completed in 1964.

When it was first built, the Wilkinson Center had an area of 287,539 square feet. The bookstore was expanded in 1974 with an extension further west. This expansion costs nearly $1.5 million.

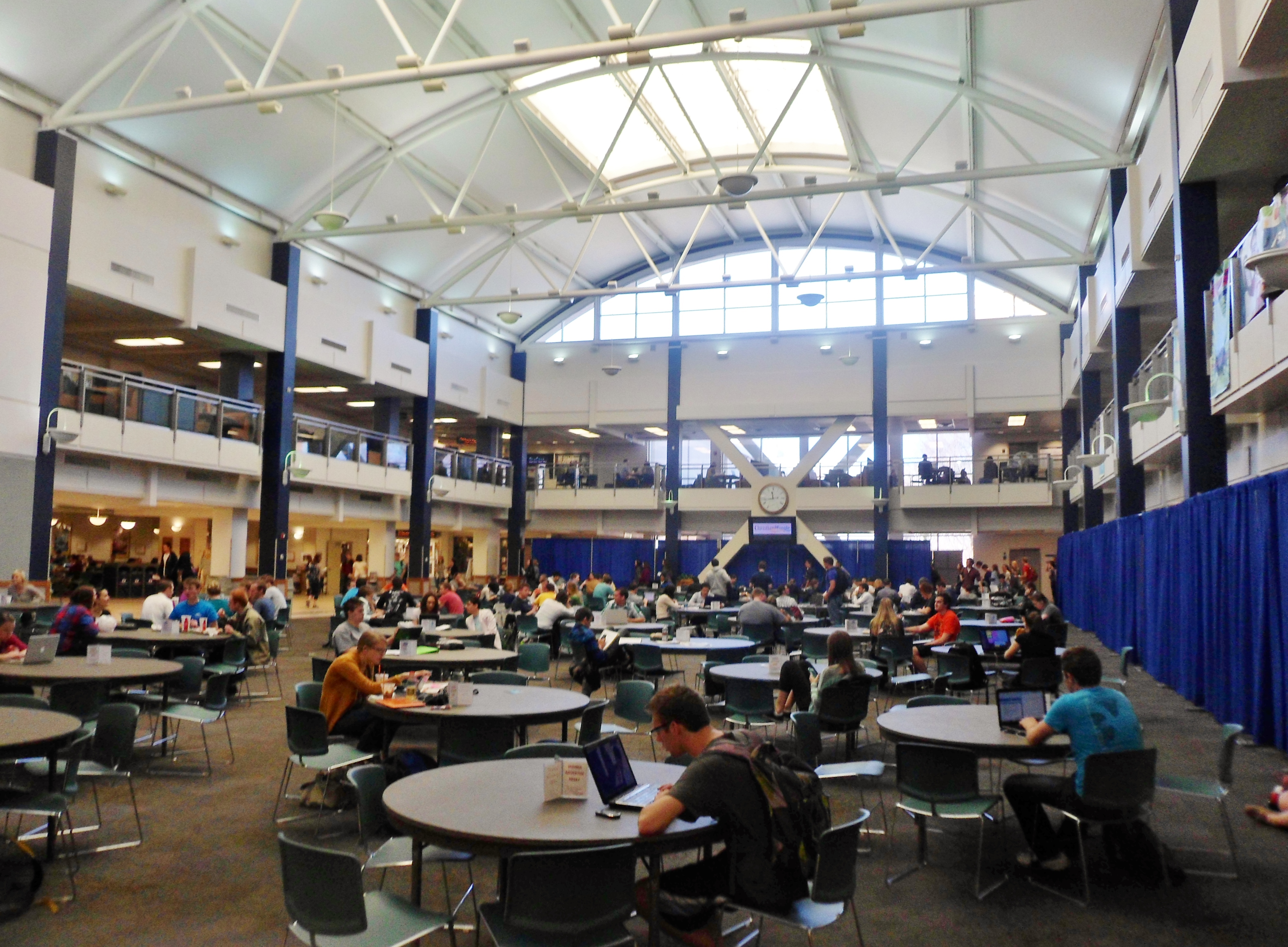
Main area of the Wilkinson Student Center

After the 1999 renovations, the WSC had 498,000 square feet of usable space. That renovation moved most student support offices into the building. It also saw the change of the Cougareat to a food court format.

In 2017, the old memorial hall was replaced by the reflection center. Although it still listed BYU students killed in military service, the addition of three paintings, focusing on Jesus Christ and his mission, shifted the room to be more broadly a place for reflection and meditation.

== Sources ==
- Wilkinson Center building directory
- Hatch and Miller. A History of BYU Grounds. (Provo: BYU Physical Plant Department, 2001), Vol. 8, p. 18.
