= Ann-Britt Ryd Pettersson =

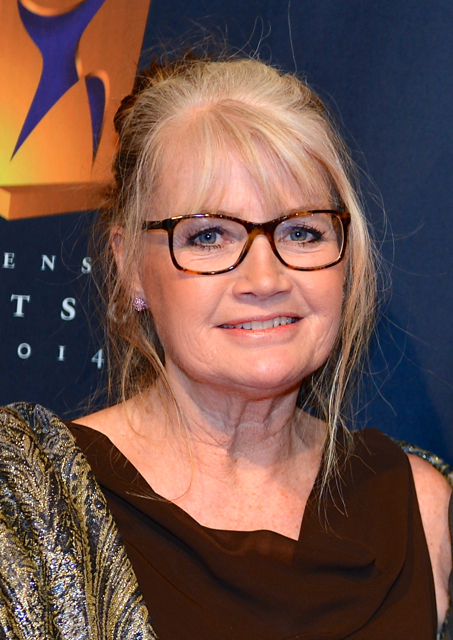
- Ann-Britt Ryd Pettersson during Svenska idrottsgalan 2014.
- Born: 10 March 1954 (age 72)
- Occupations: news reporter, sports journalist

Ann-Britt Ryd Pettersson, born 19 March 1954, is a Swedish news reporter at Sveriges Television. She began working for SR Blekinge by the late 1970s, before becoming host for regional news programme Östnytt. In 1980, she became first female employed by the SVT sports section.

During the 2018 Kristallen Awards, she was awarded the special prize.
