= John Longden (Mormon) =

Assistant to the Quorum of the Twelve Apostles
- 6 October 1951 – 30 August 1969

Personal details
- Born: 4 November 1898; Oldham, Lancashire, England, United Kingdom
- Died: 30 August 1969 (aged 70); Salt Lake City, Utah, United States
- Alma mater: University of Utah
- Spouse(s): Frances LaRue Carr
- Children: 3 Sharon Longden

John Longden (4 November 1898 – 30 August 1969) was a general authority of the Church of Jesus Christ of Latter-day Saints from 1951 until his death.

Longden was born in Oldham, Lancashire, England. In 1909, he and his parents, who were Latter-day Saints, moved from England to the United States. Prior to their departure, he had the opportunity to meet LDS Church apostle Charles W. Penrose at the British Mission office.

From 1921 to 1924 Longden served as a LDS Church missionary in the Central States Mission. From 1925 to 1930 he served as bishop of the 19th Ward in Salt Lake City, Utah. For part of this time, Frank I. Kooyman was one of Longden's counselors.

Longden received his degree from the University of Utah. Longden worked in management with Westinghouse Electric Supply Company. During World War II Longden served as one of the assistant servicemen coordinators on the Servicemen's Committee of the Church of Jesus Christ of Latter-day Saints serving under Hugh B. Brown.

Longden married Frances Larue Carr. She served from 1948 to 1961 as a counselor in the general presidency of the Young Women's Mutual Improvement Association. John and Frances had three children. One of these, Sharon Longden, married Loren C. Dunn, who also became a general authority of the LDS Church.

In 1951, Longden became an Assistant to the Quorum of the Twelve Apostles. Among the assignments that Longden held while a general authority was being a Church Welfare Committee Advisor. Longden died in Salt Lake City.
