= Loren C. Dunn =

American religious leader (1930–2001)

Emeritus General Authority
- October 7, 2000 – May 16, 2001
- Called by: Gordon B. Hinckley

First Quorum of the Seventy
- October 1, 1976 – October 7, 2000
- Called by: Spencer W. Kimball
- End reason: Granted general authority emeritus status

First Council of the Seventy
- April 6, 1968 – October 1, 1976
- Called by: David O. McKay
- End reason: Position abolished

Personal details
- Born: Loren Charles Dunn; June 12, 1930; Tooele, Utah, United States
- Died: May 16, 2001 (aged 70); Boston, Massachusetts, United States

Loren Charles Dunn (June 12, 1930 – May 16, 2001) was a general authority of the Church of Jesus Christ of Latter-day Saints (LDS Church) from 1968 until his death.

Dunn was born in Tooele, Utah. He served a mission for the LDS Church to Australia from 1954 to 1956 and married Sharon Longden, a daughter of John Longden. Dunn earned a bachelor's degree in journalism and economics from Brigham Young University (BYU). While at BYU, Dunn was also on the basketball team that won the National Invitation Tournament in 1951. He later earned a master's degree in public relations from Boston University. At the time of his call as a general authority, Dunn was living in Natick, Massachusetts, and working in Boston.

After Dunn became a member of the seven-man First Council of the Seventy in 1968, he served in several key church positions. He was the managing director of the church's Missionary Department in 1974. In the early 1980s, he served as director of the church's Adult Curriculum Department. Dunn was an inaugural member of the newly created First Quorum of the Seventy in 1976 and he was also the president of the church's Australia Sydney Mission for three years.

Dunn served as president of several areas of the church in North America. In 1984, he was the president of the North America Northwest Area. Later, while serving as president of the North America Central Area, he also served as president of Nauvoo Restoration, Inc.

In October 2000, Dunn was designated as an emeritus general authority. He was called that same month as the first president of the Boston Massachusetts Temple. He served in this position until his death from cancer in a Boston hospital.

Dunn wrote the words to the hymn "Testimony", which is hymn number 137 in the 1985 English-language edition of the LDS Church hymnal.

Among Dunn's published works is Prepare Now to Succeed on Your Mission (Salt Lake City, Utah: Bookcraft, 1977).

Dunn and his wife, Sharon, were the parents of five children and they had 20 grandchildren.
