= List of Brigham Young University buildings =

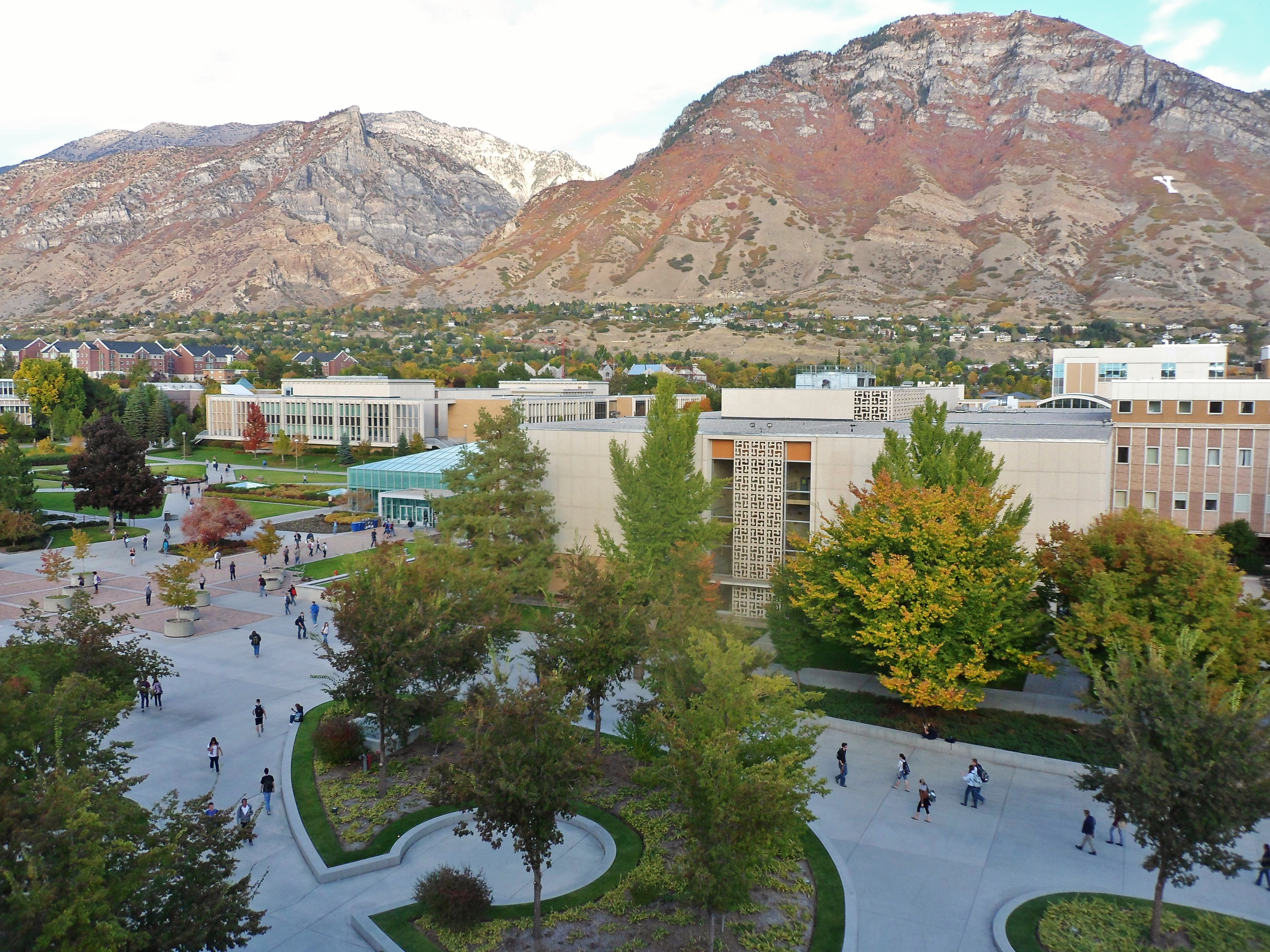
The Harold B. Lee Library and other central buildings with Y Mountain and Kyhv Peak in the background

This list of Brigham Young University buildings catalogs the current and no-longer-existent structures of Brigham Young University (BYU), a private, coeducational research university owned by the Church of Jesus Christ of Latter-day Saints (LDS Church) located in Provo, Utah, United States. BYU's buildings exceed 300 in number and cover the university's 560 acres (2.3 km^{2}) of property.

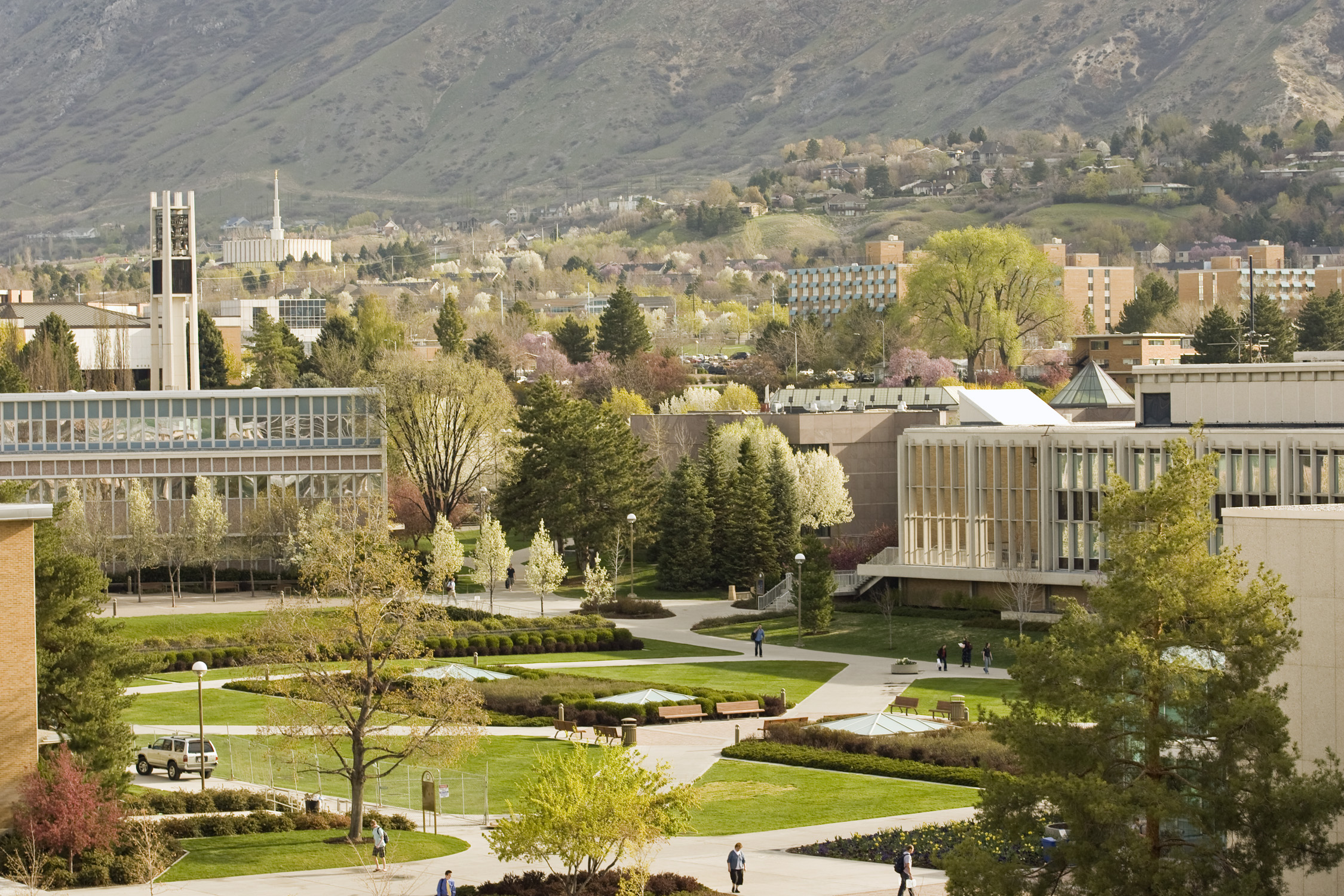
Overlooking the buildings on North Campus, June 2010

== Academic facilities ==
Building	Abbr.	Image	Sq. Ft.	Yr. Occ.	Notes	References
Benson (Ezra Taft) Building	BNSN		191,325	1995	Constructed on land previously occupied by the old Joseph Smith Building, the BNSN houses the chemistry and biochemistry department, including labs, offices, and classrooms. The building also includes the Simmons Center for Cancer Research.	
Brimhall (George H.) Building	BRMB		40,276	1918	Originally built as a one-story building. It housed the Student Army Training Corps as its first function, since it was completed during World War I. It was then called the mechanical arts building. After the SATC was no longer on BYU campus the building was used by the department of mechanical arts for such things as black smithing and woodworking classes. In 1935 the second and third stories were added and the building was renamed in honor of George H. Brimhall, who had been BYU president when it was built. Another renovation was done in 1984 which expanded the structure. At this point the building housed several programs of the Department of Visual Arts. In 2004 the building underwent significant renovation and then became the location of BYU's School of Communications.	
BYU Conference Center	CONF		52,033	1982	The BYU Conference Center (CONF) is located on the northeastern part of the campus, with views of the nearby mountains, and shares a lobby with the Harman Continuing Education Building (HCEB). The CONF is primarily used for university sponsored conferences and events, but is also available for family events, and may be utilized as a space to have an off-site meeting or meal for a business or other organization. The CONF has two main levels with available conference space.	
Centennial Carillon Tower	BELL		1,418	1975	152 feet tall with 52 bells	
Chemicals Management Building	CMB		6,870	1993		
Clark (Herald R.) Building	HRCB		30,879	1952 (renovated 1985)	Originally known as the Student Service Center, one of the main functions of this building when it was built was housing the BYU bookstore, a function it continued until the bookstore relocated to its current location in the Wilkinson Student Center. The Clark building also from very early on housed various academic departments. For example, until about 1965 this was the location of the journalism department of BYU. The building is currently the headquarters of the David M. Kennedy Center for International Studies.	
Clark (J. Reuben) Building (Law School)	JRCB		174,970	1975 (renovated 1996)		
Clyde (W.W.) Engineering Building	CB		203,575	1973	The Clyde Building houses the College of Engineering and Technology. More than 40 percent of the total floor space is used for laboratory instruction and research in electrical, chemical, civil, and mechanical engineering, as well as for engineering analysis and interdepartmental functions. It also houses a solid-state laboratory, many large study rooms, and facilities for environmental, high-pressure, saline water, thermodynamics, nuclear, and transport processes research.	
Crabtree (Roland A.) Technology Building	CTB		99,448	1985	The Crabtree Building houses the School of Technology and the Mechanical Engineering Department, as well as offices, classrooms, laboratories, and a large study area.	
Ellsworth (Leo B.) Building	ELLB		74,557	1980		
Engineering Building	EB		184,343	2018		
Engineering Projects Lab	EPL			1970		
Engineering Research Lab	ERL		16,331	2018		
Eyring (Carl F.) Science Center	ESC		187,590	1950 (renovated 1997)	Named after Carl F. Eyring who was a BYU professor. This building contains the Royden G. Derrick Planetarium. Eyring was an acoustical physicist and dean of BYU's College of Arts and Sciences, the predecessor of about five of the current colleges.	
Former Presidents' Home	FPH		5,616	1925 (renovated 1989)	This is the location of the offices of BYU's Graduate Studies.	
Grant (Heber J.) Building	HGB		26,463	1925 (renovated 1982)	The Heber J. Grant Building was originally the BYU Library. After the library moved to its current location at the Harold B. Lee Library the building has served many functions. For a time it housed the BYU Honors Program. It was also the first location of the BYU Faculty Center. Currently it houses the BYU Testing Center, the Religious Studies Center and also has a few classrooms.	
Harman (Caroline Hemenway) Building	HCEB		142,553	1982 (renovated 2018)	Named after the stepmother of Pete Harman, the developer of the KFC franchising system. He was a major financial contributor to the original building's construction. Home to the BYU Division of Continuing Education. Approximately 100,000 square feet of space was added upon completion of the 2018 renovations. It shares a lobby with the BYU Conference Center.	
Johnson (Doran) House East	JNEH			1965		
Kimball (Spencer W.) Tower	KMBL		133,849	1981	Named after Spencer W. Kimball, the KMBL is the tallest building on campus and the third tallest building in Provo. It stands approximately 160 feet (49 m) tall (12 stories), and houses several departments and centers, including Political Science, Neuroscience, Nursing and Geography departments, as well as classrooms, faculty offices, an auditorium, and a large computer lab.	
Knight (Jesse) Building	JKB		139,164	1960 (renovated 2007)	Named after Amanda Knight's husband, Jesse Knight. When it was first built the Jesse Knight Building was the business building. It was significantly expanded in 1966. After the Tanner Building was built the Jesse Knight Building became the location of the College of Humanities. However, with the completion of the new Joseph F. Smith Building in 2005 some humanities functions were shifted out of the Jesse Knight Building, and some non-humanities institutions have moved into the building, so it is no longer known as the Jesse Knight Humanities Building (JKHB) as it was for many years. Currently the Jesse Knight Building is the location of the BYU Police, Office of First-Year Experience, Human Resource Development, the Visual Arts department (in the BYU College of Fine Arts and Communications), the English Writing Center, the Humanities Publications Center, School of Management computer laboratories, and classrooms.	
Lee (Harold B.) Library	HBLL		715,983	1961 (renovated 1999)	The Lee Library, completed in 1961, was originally named the J. Reuben Clark Library, but when BYU named its law school after President Clark, the library name was changed to honor LDS Church President Harold B. Lee. Included in the library are archives and manuscript collections of Western American history, historical film and music collections, and a learning resource center offering all types of media. The library's LDS family history facility is the second-largest in the world. With more than three million volumes in the university's library collection, and nearly half of those books in storage off-campus, an addition to BYU's large library was long overdue. The 234,000-square-foot (21,700 m^{2}) addition to the library opened in the fall of 1999.	
Life Sciences Building	LSB		269,936	2014	The building houses the College of Life Sciences and five of its seven departments.	
Life Sciences Greenhouses	LSGH		21,021	2011	The Life Sciences Greenhouses were built to replace the greenhouses by the Cluff Building. They are located adjacent to Kiwanis Park on the east side of Provo at 1000 East 820 North.	
Life Sciences Greenhouses Storage Shed #1	LSG1		784	2011		
Life Sciences Greenhouses Storage Shed #2	LSG2		200	2011		
Life Sciences Horse Stable	P30L			1992		
Maeser (Karl G.) Building	MSRB		19,255	1911 (renovated 1985)	Named after Karl G. Maeser, the MSRB currently houses a lecture hall and the administrative offices for the university's Honors Program.	
Martin (Thomas L.) Building	MARB		43,717	1969 (renovated 2000)	Mainly consists of lecture halls. This includes four that have seating capacity of 254 students. The building is also used extensively for BYU LDS Wards to meet, since such sized rooms are ideal for sacrament meeting at least in area. This building, with its primary focus on science and liberal arts classes, rarely houses fine arts classes and has multiple pianos in it.	
McKay (David O.) Building	MCKB		80,939	1954 (renovated 2003)	The David O. McKay building is named for David O. McKay, a Latter-day Saint educator and president of the church when it was built. It houses most of the offices and many classrooms of the David O. McKay School of Education. When initially built, the English, Modern Languages, History and Political Science Departments were also located here, but they all later moved to other buildings as the campus grew.	
Music Building	MB		170,000	2023	The MB houses the academic and performance spaces for the BYU School of Music. It contains numerous practice and performance rooms, including a 1,000-seat vineyard-style performance hall.	
Nicholes (Joseph K.) Building (Chemical Stores)	NICB		23,920	1971	The NICB predates the much larger Ezra Taft Benson Building to which it is attached by about 25 years. It is currently used as the chemical storehouse for many of BYU's STEM programs.	
Risk Management Building	RMB		6,638	1964	Formerly known as B49, BYU's Risk Management Department moved into this building following the demolition of the Harvey Fletcher Building in 2019. The RMB was originally built as the Herbarium and Range Science Lab of BYU. It later housed the Ezra Taft Benson Agriculture and Food Institute. However, in January 2008, it was decided to disassociate the Benson Institute from BYU and make it an independent operation of the Church of Jesus Christ of Latter-day Saints and its welfare system, because the Institute had a practical instead of an academic purpose. The Benson Institute moved to the LDS Church Office Building and the Neal A. Maxwell Institute for Religious Scholarship moved into this building, vacating its former home just west of the McDonald Building. Following Risk Management's move into the RMB, the Maxwell Institute moved into temporary offices in the Clyde Engineering Building to await a permanent home in the new West View Building.	
Smith (Joseph F.) Building	JFSB		317,552	2005	Named after Joseph F. Smith, the JFSB is home to the History, Sociology, Social Work, and the School of Family Life departments, as well as many research centers and institutes within the College of Family, Home, and Social Sciences. The building is also shared with the College of Humanities.	
Smith (Joseph) Building	JSB		73,815	1991	The Joseph Smith Building is named after Joseph Smith, the founder of the Church of Jesus Christ of Latter-day Saints. It is the home to BYU's College of Religion. It contains most of the offices of religion faculty as well as a large number of class rooms where religion classes are held. It also has a very large lecture hall that seats about 1,000 people and is used for large classes.	
Snell (William H.) Building	SNLB		37,796	1959 (renovated 2010)	Originally home of the College of Industrial and Technical Education. This college was merged into the College of Engineering and Technology in the 1970s and this building was one of the buildings used by the new college.	
Talmage (James E.) Math Sciences/Computer Building	TMCB		158,696	1971 (renovated 1990)	Named for LDS Apostle and scientist James E. Talmage. When it was built it housed the Computer Science, Math and Statistics departments. It also housed The BYU Research Center and the Office of Institutional Research. It had 25 classrooms as well as its offices and computer rooms. At the time of construction it had 61,000 square feet (5,700 m^{2}). A large addition was later built onto the west end of the building.	
Tanner (N. Eldon) Building	TNRB		224,901	1983 (addition built 2008)	Houses the Marriott School of Business	
Taylor (John) Building (Comprehensive Clinic)	TLRB		34,549	1980	This building has been the comprehensive clinic from its first use. It was built to provide a single location for those in the human services discipline, and provides marriage, family, child, adolescent, and individual therapy and counseling as well as doing various forms of diagnostic testing. It also houses the Communication Disorders Department and LDS Family Services.	
University Parkway Center	UPC		48,601	1999	This building houses the English Language Center for foreign students learning English as a second language.	
Weather Station	WTHR		42	1980	Situated directly southwest of the Risk Management Building (B49).	
West View Building	WVB			2020	Plans were announced in November 2018 to demolish and replace the Faculty Office Building (FOB) with the West View Building. The WVB has several classrooms and houses the offices for the Department of Economics, the Department of Statistics, and the Neal A. Maxwell Center for Religious Scholarship.	
Wells (Daniel H.) Building (ROTC)	ROTC		15,188	1968	Named after Daniel H. Wells, an apostle of the Church of Jesus Christ of Latter-day Saints and the third mayor of Salt Lake City.	

== Administrative buildings ==
Building	Abbr.	Image	Yr. Occ.	Notes	References
Brewster (Sam F.) Building	BRWB		1962		
Bullock House	BULH		1996		
University Guest House	GH		2014	The 5,000 square-foot guest house was built with the intention of giving campus visitors closer access to campus and students. It provides many amenities to university guests similar to what a hotel provides. The house was designed to match the style of the neighboring historic Former Presidents' home.	
Hinckley (Gordon B.) Alumni & Visitors Center	HC		2007	Named after Gordon B. Hinckley, the fifteenth President of the Church of Jesus Christ of Latter-day Saints, the Gordon B. Hinckley Alumni and Visitors Center serves as the gateway to campus and houses the Alumni Association, Guest Relations and Public Affairs, Annual Giving and School Relations.	
Information Technology Building	ITB		2009	The Information Technology Building is a three-story building located west of the main campus between Canyon Road and University Avenue. It houses the majority of the employees working for the Office of Information Technology.	
McDonald (Howard S.) Building	MB		1955	Named for Howard S. McDonald, former president of BYU. This was the location of the Student Health Center from 1955 until 1999 when it moved to its current location. The student health service had begun in 1946 and been located in a small frame building by the Eyring Science Center until moving to this location. In 2001 M. Russell Ballard rededicated the building after it was refurbished to be used by BYU's Office of Information Technology. When the McDonald Building was built it also housed the Air Force ROTC unit that was located at BYU. Starting in 2013 the McDonald building has been the location of BYU's research MRI facility.	
Smoot (Abraham O.) Administration Building	ASB		1961	Named after Abraham O. Smoot, the ASB is the main administrative building on campus and houses the president's office. The building was designed by Henry P. Fetzer. It was razed in late 2025, with a new building to be constructed in its place.	
University Press Building	UPB		1968	This building replaced the temporary building just west of the Herald Clark building that had served as the press building since 1946. This is the location of printing operations for Brigham Young University Press.	

== Athletic and outdoor recreation facilities ==
Building	Abbr.	Image	Yr. Occ.	Notes	References
Aspen Grove Family Camp	ASP		1924	Aspen Grove Family Camp began as the site for summer school. A dining hall, kitchen, and three housing units were constructed in 1924. The facilities grew over the years and after World War II were turned over to the Alumni Association to be used for a family summer camp. Today the complex consists of the Aspen Grove Conference Center, the Beckham Lodge, The Alumni Board Cabin and several family Lodges and Rustic Cabins.	
Campus Concessions Preparation Building	CCPB		1964		
Edwards (LaVell) Stadium	LVES		1964	The BYU football stadium with seating capacity of 63,470.	
Golf Storage – SFH Tennis Courts	GSTG		1994		
Haws Field	HAWF				
Indoor Practice Facility	IPF		2003		
Intramural Fields Restroom (2300 N. University Ave.)	INR2		2006		
Intramural Fields Restroom (West Stadium)	INR1		1967		
Intramural Fields Storage (West Stadium)	INST		1983		
Intramural Fields Storage Building (Helaman Halls)	INTR		1971		
Marriott (J. Willard) Center	MC		1971	Named after benefactors J. Willard and Alice Marriott, the center is a 22,700-seat multipurpose arena that is home to the BYU Cougars men's and women's basketball teams and is the site for campus devotionals. It is currently the third-largest on-campus arena in the country.	
Miller Park (Baseball/Softball Complex)	MLRP		2001		
NCAA Outdoor Track	NCAA				
North University Fields	NUF		2006		
Richards (Stephen L.) Building	RB		1965	The Richards Building includes 3 swimming pools (one dive tank, a competition pool and a recreational pool). An addition to the north end of the building, including additional dance practice rooms was completed in 2008.	
River Park Restroom	RPRR		1981		
Robison (Clarence F.) Track Press Box	TRPB		1982	Named after Clarence F. Robison who was the BYU track coach for 40 years and had competed for the US in the 1948 Olympics.	
SFH Tennis Storage and Restroom Building	RRM		1959		
Smith (George Albert) Fieldhouse	SFH		1951	A 5,000 seat multi-purpose arena named after George Albert Smith the eighth president of the Church of Jesus Christ of Latter-day Saints. A 28,950-square-foot (2,690 m^{2}) addition was built onto the building in 1959 and another in the 1960s.	
Southeast Recreation Area	SERA				
South Field Ticket Booth	SFTB		2008		
Spring Haven Cabin	SPHV		1999		
Stadium East House	STEH		1998		
Stadium Ticket Booth Guests	STTG		1983		
Stadium Ticket Booth West	STTW		1982		
Stadium West House	STWH		1998		
Student Athlete Building	SAB		2003		
Tennis Courts Building	TCB		1968		
Tennis Scheduling Building – SFH Tennis Courts	TC01		1994		
Tennis Storage – SFH Tennis Courts	TC02		1994		
Tennis Storage – SFH Tennis Courts	TC03		1994		
Tennis Storage – SFH Tennis Courts	TC04		1994		
Timp Lodge	TIMP		1971	Located in Provo Canyon	
Track Restroom Building	TRRR		1987		
Utah Lake Boathouse	ULBH		1964	Built as a lakeside laboratory. A metal storage garage was built close to this building in 1970.	

== Auxiliary buildings ==
Building	Abbr.	Image	Yr. Occ.	Notes	References
Auxiliary Services Laundry Building	AXLB		1968		
Auxiliary Services Maintenance Bldg	AXMB		1968		
Creamery On Ninth East (BYU Creamery)	CONE		1999		
Culinary Support Center (BYU Creamery)	CSC		1964	The BYU Creamery Outlet and its related locations serve as grocery stores for the campus and provides freshly made dairy products. BYU Creamery has four locations: Creamery on Ninth East, Creamery Outlet, Helaman Creamery, and Wyview Creamery.	
Morris (George Q.) Center	MORC		1964		
Morris Center Storage Shed	MRSS		1994		
Student Health Center	SHC		1998		
University Services Building	USB		1968	The University Services Building (formerly Student Auxiliary Services) houses Campus Floral, BYU Creative Marketing, Dining Services, and others.	
Wilkinson (Ernest L.) Student Center	WSC		1964	This building, completed in 1964, was named for Ernest L. Wilkinson, sixth president of BYU (1951–1971). Planning for the center took 12 years, and 60 percent of the cost was paid by students. The BYU Store takes up one corner of this building. Also in the building are food services, including a food court with franchise restaurants, a high class restaurant called the Skyroom taking up the sixth floor, BYU catering's central operations and two other places to buy food not connected with any of the above. The building also has conference rooms, two large ballrooms, a movie theatre, a full-service copy center, a post office and a bowling alley. There is a full service salon called Studio 1030 located on the lower east end of the building. The building also housing the Dean of Students Office, various counseling and conflict resolution offices, and various other student services offices.	

== Broadcasting buildings ==
Building	Abbr.	Image	Yr. Occ.	Notes	References
BYU Broadcasting Building	BYUB		2010		
KBYU Media Center	KMC		1987		
Mount Vision Transmitter Building (KBYU)	MTV		1978		

== Museums ==
Building	Abbr.	Image	Yr. Occ.	Notes	References
Museum of Peoples and Cultures			2014	The Museum of Peoples and Cultures opened at this location north of the main campus in 2014	
Bean (Monte L.) Life Science Museum	MLBM		1978	Named after Monte L. Bean, the museum contains research collections of vascular and non vascular plants, as well as invertebrate and vertebrate animals.	
Education in Zion			2008	Located in the Joseph Fielding Smith Building (JFSB), Education in Zion is a museum with exhibits focused on the relationship between sacred and secular education in the Church of Jesus Christ of Latter-day Saints.	
Museum of Art	MOA		1993	The MOA is a four-story, modern facility of more than 102,000 square feet.	
Museum of Paleontology	MP		1976		

== Off-campus buildings ==
=== Observatory complex ===
The observatory complex is located near the south end of Utah Lake, west of Payson, Utah.

Building	Abbr.	Image	Yr. Occ.	Notes	References
Observatory (1) – West Mountain	OBS1		1981		
Observatory (2) – West Mountain	OBS2		1996		
Observatory (3) – West Mountain	OBS3		2008		
Observatory Residence – West Mountain	OBSH		1982		

=== Off-campus student centers ===
Building	Abbr.	Image	Yr. Occ.	Notes	References
BYU Jerusalem Center	JRMC		1987	Brigham Young University began conducting "studies abroad" in Jerusalem in 1968. This program was very successful and, eleven years later in 1979, Church leaders decided to build a structure that would serve both the needs of the university and the Mormon community in Jerusalem. This building sits on Mount Scopus overlooking the Mount of Olives, the Kidron Valley and the Old City.	
BYU London Study Abroad Center	LNDC			The BYU London Study Abroad Center has been housed in a 125-year-old Victorian building that was the Russian ambassador's private home before BYU purchased it in 1978. The structures were renovated in 1990.	
BYU Salt Lake Center	SLC		1959	As it is affectionately called, "The Center" has been a part of the Salt Lake Valley since 1959 as an extension of Brigham Young University, located in Provo, Utah, that offers classes to students living in the state's capital city.	
Barlow (Milton A.) Center (Washington D.C.)	BRLW		1991	The Barlow Center in Washington, D.C. provides housing for 44 to 50 students and advisors. It not only provides affordable housing but also creates a noticeable presence for BYU and the Church of Jesus Christ in Washington that strengthens their stature among the nation's leaders and decision makers. The Washington Seminar selects well-qualified students from all majors to have an applied learning experience in Washington, D.C. Through a quality internship, briefings on current national issues, tours, and excursions, interns gain a valuable supplement to their academic training and the chance to be better prepared for their careers.	

=== Ranches and preserves ===
Building	Abbr.	Image	Yr. Occ.	Notes	References
Lytle Preserve				A 460-outdoor classroom in South-western Utah. Used for ecological research in a desert setting.	
Skaggs Ranch				An over 9,000 acre research ranch located near Malta, Idaho	

== On-Campus Housing ==
=== Language Immersion Student Residence (LISR) ===
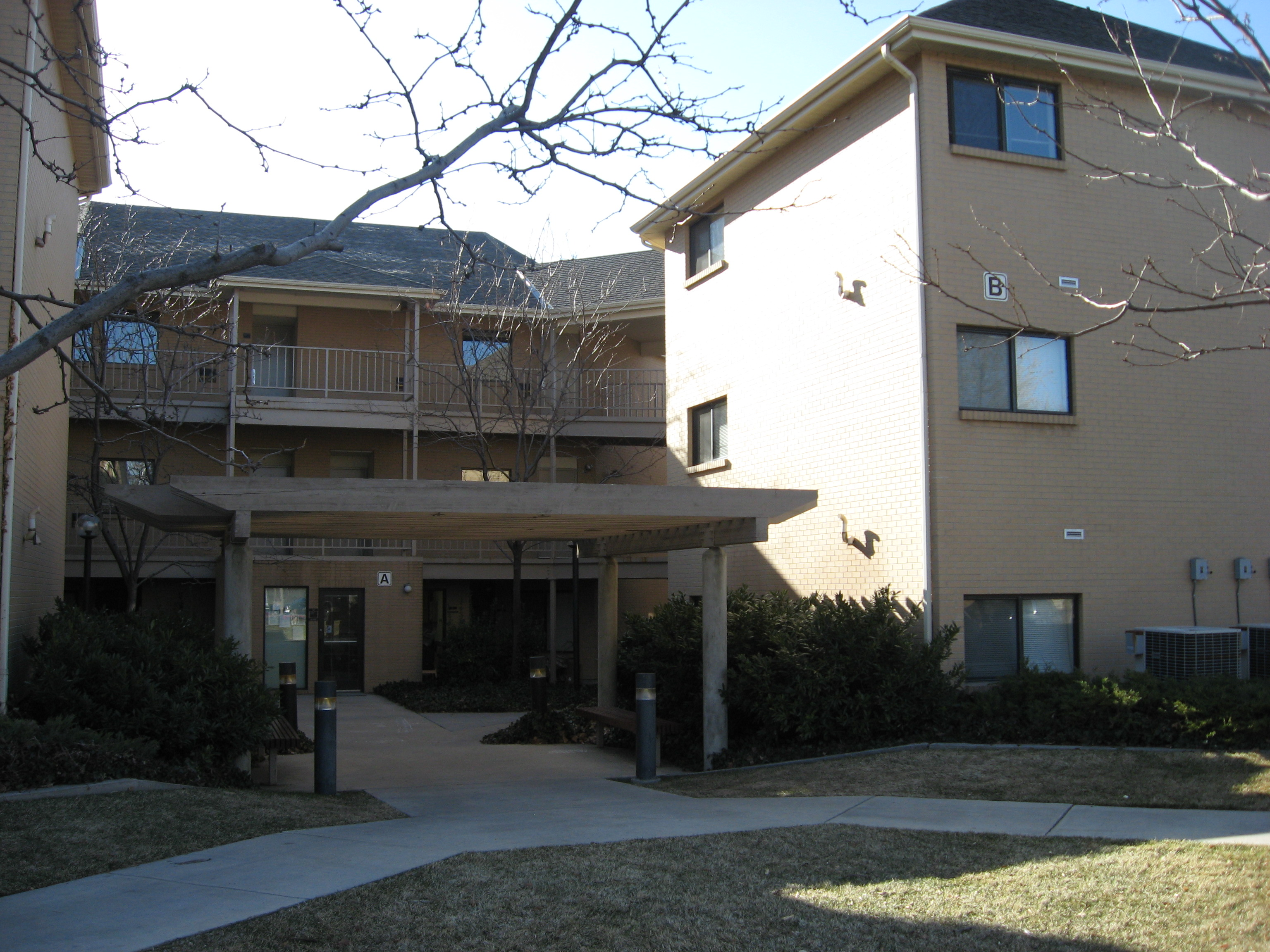

Brigham Young University's Language Immersion Student Residence (LISR) program was established in 1978 as a three-house off-campus residence center dedicated to the study of Russian and Italian. Due to the success of these houses, the program expanded from three houses to one specially designed complex in 1991. Today the LISR consists of five buildings- four outer buildings with three floors each. These contain all of the male and female apartments for the program. The central building has rooms used for student activities, dinners, and Sunday church meetings. The on-campus complex consists of 25 individual apartments for men and women learning eleven different languages (depending on demand): Hebrew, Chinese, French, German, Italian, Japanese, Portuguese, Russian, Korean, and Spanish. Residents of these apartments agree to speak only their apartment's assigned language during the school year while in the apartment. Students are accompanied by a native resident throughout the year to enhance the experience. The Language Immersion Student Residence houses between 130 and 150 students per semester.

=== Helaman Halls ===
40°15′8″N 111°39′11″W
Helaman Halls, named after one of the Book of Mormon heroes of the Church of Jesus Christ of Latter-day Saints, was first opened for use in the Fall of 1958. The initial on-campus complex consisted of five residence halls, a central dining building, and an administration building. Construction costs were $5,300,000, and when completed the complex initially housed 1170 male students. The residence buildings were named after prominent LDS individuals and/or families, including the Hinckley Family, Stephen L. Chipman, David John, Thomas N. Taylor, and Walter Stover. The dining building was christened the George Q. Cannon Building and at the time could accommodate 1,800 people. In addition, both a pool and a "recreation field" the latter of which included eight tennis courts four softball fields was completed for the use of residents. Two more residence buildings were already under construction when the completion of the original Helaman Halls Complex was announced on September 18, 1958. The two new buildings were opened for use in September 1959, and housed 234 women each, bringing the total occupancy number of the complex to 1638. In 1959, the semester rent for Helaman halls was approximately $23 per term. Another building, May Hall, was added in 1970, and a new men's hall, which has not been officially named but is referred to as "Building 9", was built between Merrill and May halls in 2010.

Notable individuals who lived at Helaman Halls include Mike Leach, Vai Sikahema, and Alema Harrington.

Today, Helaman Halls has a total of nine residence buildings with five buildings for women and four buildings for men. The Residence Halls are located on the northwest corner of campus. Living style consists of two people per room, with 22 rooms on each floor, with six floors (in three stories) per building. Helaman Halls currently has housing for just over 2,100 students. The halls underwent a 12-year renovation spanning from 1991 through 2003. There are basic kitchen facilities in the basement lobby of each hall, but residents are required to purchase a meal plan. The majority of resident meals are eaten in the area central building- the Cannon Center. Because of its close proximity to the athletic facilities and all-you-can-eat dining, many Freshman athletes choose to live in Helaman Halls.

Building	Abbr.	Image	Yr. Occ.	Notes	References
Cannon (George Q.) Center	CANC		2008	The Cannon Center acts as a central building for Helaman Halls residents, providing areas for activities such as dances, as well as providing mail services and checking out athletic equipment such as basketballs and volleyballs. Besides this, The Commons at the Cannon Center provide meal services for the residents of Helaman halls, as well as the rest of campus; it serves as the main cafeteria for BYU since the 2008 closing of the Morris Center. The current Cannon Center is the second building of this name. It was built while the old Cannon Center was still in operation and so is located slightly north and east of the old building. The old Cannon center in general filled the same function and role as the current building.	
Helaman Halls (B) Hinckley (Ira N.) Hall	HLB		1958	Named after Ira N. Hinckley, the grandfather of the late President of The Church of Jesus Christ of Latter-day Saints Gordon B. Hinckley, and an acquaintance of Joseph Smith Jr.	
Helaman Halls (C) Chipman (Steven L.) Hall	HLC		1958	Named for Stephen L. Chipman, Mormon religious leader in north Utah County	
Helaman Halls (D) John (David) Hall	HLD		1958	Named after David John, father-in-law of Benjamin Cluff (third president of Brigham Young University) and vice-president of the Brigham Young Academy and Brigham Young University Board of Trustees.	
Helaman Halls (E) Taylor (Thomas N.) Hall	HLE		1958	Named after Thomas N. Taylor, mayor of Provo, Utah from 1900 to 1903 and alumnus of Brigham Young Academy.	
Helaman Halls (F) Stover (Walter F.) Hall	HLF		1958	Named after Walter F. Stover who donated all the mattresses and box springs for Helaman Halls. Stover was a native of Germany and served as president of the East German mission immediately after World War II. He also served on the General Church Welfare Committee of The Church of Jesus Christ of Latter-day Saints.	
Helaman Halls (G) Budge (William) Hall	HLG		1959	Named for William Budge, the man who baptized Karl G. Maeser, often viewed as the founder of BYU although that distinction is not held by any one person, see History of Brigham Young University	
Helaman Halls (H) Merrill (Marriner Wood) Hall	HLH		1959	Named after LDS apostle Marriner W. Merrill	
Helaman Halls (I) May (Jean Fossum) Hall	HLI		1970	Named after Jean Fossum May (1906–1969), the head resident of Stover Hall for the last 10 years of her life. May had served a mission for the LDS Church when she was a little more than 20 years old. She greatly encouraged residents in her hall to serve missions and faithfully corresponded with them while they were on missions.	
Helaman Halls (J) "Building 9"	HLJ		2010		

=== Heritage Halls ===
- 40°15′5″N 111°38′40″W

Heritage Halls were originally built in 1953. They were the oldest dorms on campus until they were torn down (see Previous Residential Facilities below) and replaced by the new Heritage Halls buildings. In order to make room for the new Heritage Halls buildings, the Deseret Towers "DT" apartment complex was also torn down from 2006 to 2008, and construction on the new buildings at the Heritage complex began in 2011.

Today, Heritage Halls is a complex of dorms that consists of 14 buildings, located on the East side of campus. In the summer of 2017, work was completed on a new central building and one additional dorm building, bringing the total capacity to about 2,750 students. Two additional dorm buildings are currently under construction.

The living arrangements in Heritage Halls are similar to those of an apartment. Students share a kitchen and a common area. Each of the L-shaped buildings houses about 210 students. They are 4 stories high and feature East Coast classic design. Activity rooms on each floor have pictures with Church history themes and have floor-to-ceiling windows that offer views of the surrounding area. The individual units feature full kitchens, bedrooms with individualized lighting systems, and hallway vanities.

The buildings in the Heritage Halls complex are as follows:

Building	Abbr.	Image	Yr. Occ.	Notes	References
Heritage Halls Central Building	HR01	Photograph of the Central Building in Heritage Halls.	2017	The Central Building features study rooms that students can sign up to use. It also includes a ballroom and small kitchen that can host student activities and ward groups.	
Heritage Halls 2	HR02	Photograph of Building 2 (formerly 7) in Heritage Halls.	2015		
Heritage Halls 3	HR03	Photograph of Building 3 (formerly 9) in Heritage Halls.	2014		
Heritage Halls 4	HR04	Photograph of Building 4 (formerly 10) in Heritage Halls.	2014		
Heritage Halls 5	HR05	Photograph of Building 5 (formerly 8) in Heritage Halls.	2015		
Heritage Halls 6	HR06	Photograph of Building 6 in Heritage Halls.	2017		
Heritage Halls 7	HR07	Photograph of Building 7 (formerly 14) in Heritage Halls.	2015		
Heritage Halls 8	HR08	Photograph of Building 8 (formerly 15) in Heritage Halls.	2015		
Heritage Halls 9	HR09	Photograph of Building 9 (formerly 25) in Heritage Halls.	2011		
Heritage Halls 10	HR10	Photograph of Building 10 (formerly 26) in Heritage Halls.	2012		
Heritage Halls 11	HR11	Photograph of Building 11 (formerly 27) in Heritage Halls.	2012		
Heritage Halls 12	HR12	Photograph of Building 12 (formerly 28) in Heritage Halls.	2011		
Heritage Halls 13	HR13		2020	HR13 and HR14 are the last two buildings that were built as part of the "New Heritage" project. Both were completed and ready for use by the start of the Fall 2020 semester.	
Heritage Halls 14	HR14		2020		
Heritage Halls 15	HR15	Photograph of Building 15 (formerly 30) in Heritage Halls.	2013		
Heritage Halls 16	HR16	Photograph of Building 16 (formerly 29) in Heritage Halls.	2013		

=== Wymount Terrace ===
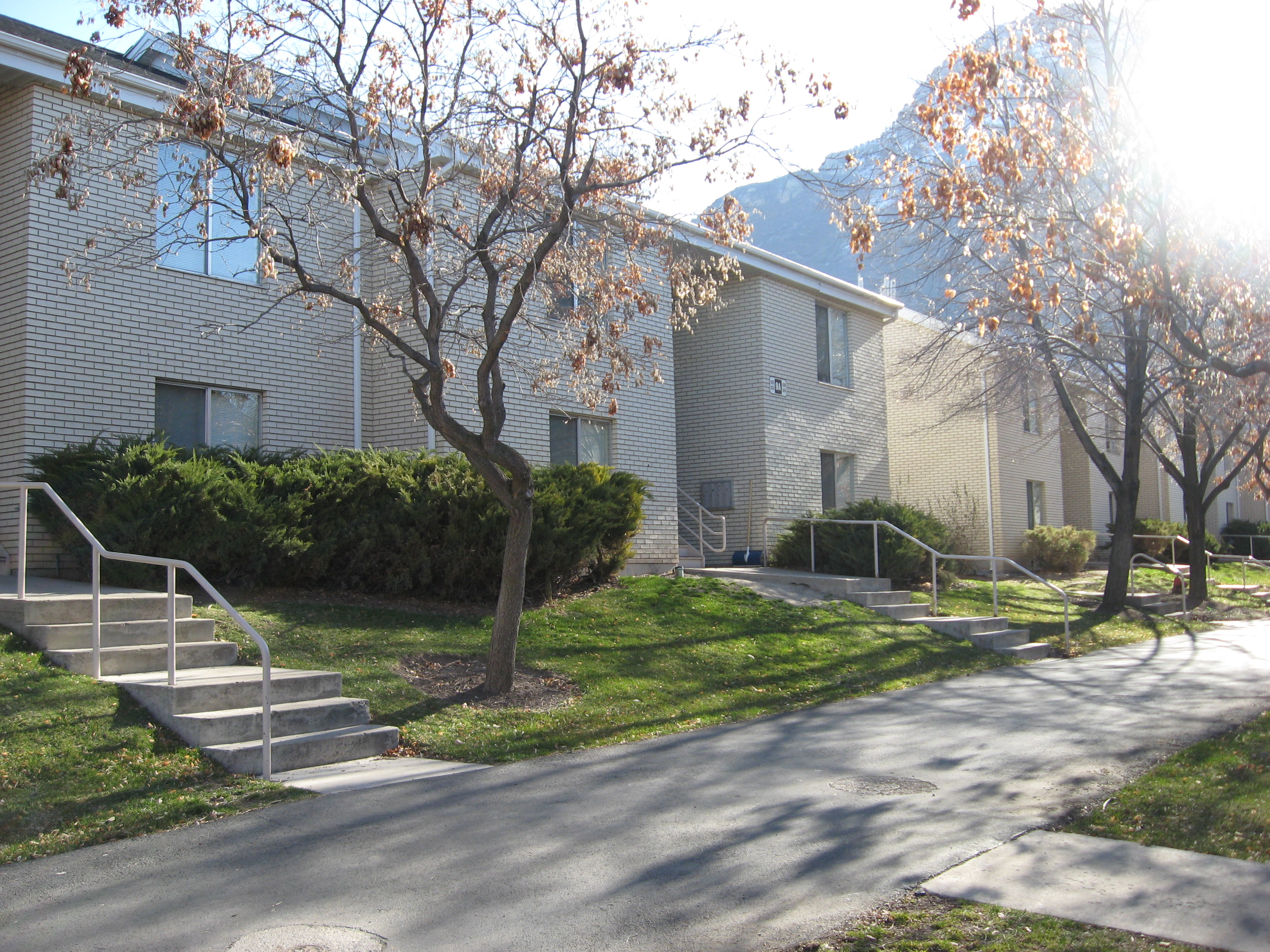
Wymount Terrace Student Family Housing.

Wymount Terrace is the family housing unit for married students and is located on the northeast side of campus. It consists of South Wymount (24 three-story apartment buildings) and North Wymount (48 two-story apartment buildings). The buildings are arranged in quadrangles that enclose lawn and playground areas. The complex started as a trailer park and was converted into apartment housing in the 1960s. The buildings in the Wymount Terrace complex include:

Building	Abbr.	Image	Yr. Occ.	Notes	References
Wymount Terrace Administration Building	WOAB		1962		
Wymount Terrace Laundry Building #1	W0L1		1962		
Wymount Terrace Laundry Building #2	W0L2		1962		
Wymount Terrace Laundry Building #3	W0L3		1962		
Wymount Terrace Laundry Building #4	W0L4		1979		
Wymount Terrace Laundry Building #5	W0L5		1985		
Wymount Terrace Multi-Purpose Center	W0MP		1980	This is where many of the wards consisting of Wymont residents hold church meetings. The other main location for church meetings is the stake center on 9th east between the south end of Wymount and the rest of BYU campus.	
Wymount Terrace (W01A) Kimball, (Sarah M.)	W01A		1962	Named for Sarah M. Kimball.	
Wymount Terrace (W01B) Reynolds, (Alice Louise)	W01B		1962	Alice Louise Reynolds was a professor of English at BYU during the early 20th century.	
Wymount Terrace (W01C) Smith (Julia Lambson)	W01C		1962	Julia Lambson Smith was a wife of Joseph F. Smith and the mother of Joseph Fielding Smith.	
Wymount Terrace (W02A) Bennion (Samuel O.)	W02A		1962	Named for Samuel O. Bennion	
Wymount Terrace (W02B) Ivins (Antoine R.)	W02B		1962	Named for Antoine R. Ivins	
Wymount Terrace (W02C) Kimball (J. Golden)	W02C		1962	Named for J. Golden Kimball	
Wymount Terrace (W02D) Roberts (Brigham H.)	W02D		1962	Named for B. H. Roberts	
Wymount Terrace (W03A) Williams (Helen Spencer)	W03A		1963	Helen Spencer Williams, often called Helen S. Williams, was the first counselor in the YWMIA General Presidency of the Church of Jesus Christ of Latter-day Saints from 1937 to 1944. She was also a writer and columnists, writing for the Deseret News, the Improvement Era and the Relief Society Magazine.	
Wymount Terrace (W04A) Nibley (Charles W.)	W04A		1963	Named for Charles W. Nibley	
Wymount Terrace (W04B) Reynolds (George)	W04B		1963	Named for George Reynolds	
Wymount Terrace (W04C) Wirthlin (Joseph L.)	W04C		1963	Named for Joseph L. Wirthlin	
Wymount Terrace (W04D) Young (Levi Edgar)	W04D		1963	Named for Levi Edgar Young.	
Wymount Terrace (W05A) Clayton (William)	W05A		1963	Named for LDS hymnwriter William Clayton.	
Wymount Terrace (W05B) Mcclellan (John J.)	W05B		1963	Named for John J. McClellan.	
Wymount Terrace (W05C) Pratt (Orson)	W05C		1963	Named for Orson Pratt.	
Wymount Terrace (W05D) Stephens (Evan)	W05D		1963	Named for former Mormon Tabernacle Choir director Evan Stephens	
Wymount Terrace (W06A) Dixon (Henry Aldous)	W06A		1963	Named for Henry Aldous Dixon a prominent Utah educator and politician.	
Wymount Terrace (W06B) Hamblin (Jacob)	W06B		1963	Named for Mormon missionary to the Native Americans Jacob Hamblin.	
Wymount Terrace (W06C) Sutherland (George F.)	W06C		1963	One of very few buildings at BYU named for a non-Mormon, in this case Brigham Young Academy graduate and later United States Supreme Court justice George F. Sutherland	
Wymount Terrace (W06D) Swensen (John C.)	W06D		1963	Named for John C. Swensen, a BYU professor for 54 years.	
Wymount Terrace (W07A) Critchlow, Jr. (William J.)	W07A		1962	Named for William J. Critchlow Jr., a prominent LDS leader in Ogden and later a General Authority as an Assistant to the Twelve.	
Wymount Terrace (W07B) Longden (John)	W07B		1962	Named for John Longden (Mormon).	
Wymount Terrace (W07C) McKay (Thomas E.)	W07C		1962	Named for Thomas E. McKay, a brother of David O. McKay who also served as a general authority.	
Wymount Terrace (W07D) Smith (Nicholas G.)	W07D		1962	Named for Nicholas G. Smith.	
Wymount Terrace (W08A)	W08A		1979		
Wymount Terrace (W08B)	W08B		1979		
Wymount Terrace (W08C)	W08C		1979		
Wymount Terrace (W08D)	W08D		1979		
Wymount Terrace (W08E)	W08E		1979		
Wymount Terrace (W08F)	W08F		1979		
Wymount Terrace (W09A)	W09A		1979		
Wymount Terrace (W09B)	W09B		1979		
Wymount Terrace (W09C)	W09C		1979		
Wymount Terrace (W09D)	W09D		1979		
Wymount Terrace (W10A)	W10A		1979		
Wymount Terrace (W10B)	W10B		1979		
Wymount Terrace (W10C)	W10C		1979		
Wymount Terrace (W10D)	W10D		1979		
Wymount Terrace (W10E)	W10E		1979		
Wymount Terrace (W10F)	W10F		1979		
Wymount Terrace (W11A)	W11A		1979		
Wymount Terrace (W11B)	W11B		1979		
Wymount Terrace (W11C)	W11C		1979		
Wymount Terrace (W11D)	W11D		1979		
Wymount Terrace (W11E)	W11E		1979		
Wymount Terrace (W12A)	W12A		1982		
Wymount Terrace (W12B)	W12B		1982		
Wymount Terrace (W12C)	W12C		1982		
Wymount Terrace (W12D)	W12D		1982		
Wymount Terrace (W13A)	W13A		1982		
Wymount Terrace (W13B)	W13B		1982		
Wymount Terrace (W13C)	W13C		1982		
Wymount Terrace (W13D)	W13D		1982		
Wymount Terrace (W14A)	W14A		1985		
Wymount Terrace (W14B)	W14B		1985		
Wymount Terrace (W14C)	W14C		1985		
Wymount Terrace (W14D)	W14D		1985		
Wymount Terrace (W15A)	W15A		1985		
Wymount Terrace (W15B)	W15B		1985		
Wymount Terrace (W15C)	W15C		1985		
Wymount Terrace (W15D)	W15D		1985		
Wymount Terrace (W15E)	W15E		1985		
Wymount Terrace (W16A)	W16A		1992		
Wymount Terrace (W16B)	W16B		1992		
Wymount Terrace (W16C)	W16C		1992		
Wymount Terrace (W16D)	W16D		1992		
Wymount Terrace (W16E)	W16E		1992		
Wymount Terrace (W16F)	W16F		1992		
Wymount Terrace (W16G)	W16G		1992		
Wymount Terrace (W17A)	W17A		1992		
Wymount Terrace (W17B)	W17B		1992		
Wymount Terrace (W17C)	W17C		1992		

=== Wyview Park ===
In 1971, Brigham Young University purchased a group of 150 mobile home units and set them up on a tract of land between University Avenue and 200 West from 1800 North to 2230 North to provide housing for married students. This project included 36 one-bedroom units, 78 two-bedroom units, and 36 three-bedroom units. There was a central building of 5,514 square feet (512.3 m^{2}) which housed laundry facilities, and administrative offices, etc. This trailer park was demolished in 1997 to accommodate replacement married student apartments.

The current complex includes 30 buildings which originally housed married student families, until the end of the summer of 2006, when the southern half of the residential park was converted into housing for singles and eventually the entire complex. In 2013 after the winter semester of school concluded, the northern portion of Wyview was converted into a makeshift Missionary Training Center (MTC) to help alleviate the overburdened Provo MTC just up the hill. As part of this temporary MTC complex, the LDS church also obtained a lease for the Raintree Apartments across the street to the west and both facilities are used together to house missionaries and their training activities.

The buildings are arranged in quads with playgrounds and courts enclosed. The complex contains a laundromat, a convenience store, a BYU Creamery store, and a multipurpose building which houses the Wyview office and a chapel for LDS wards. The buildings in the Wyview Park complex include:

Building	Abbr.	Image	Yr. Occ.	Notes	References
Wyview Park Central Building	WPCB		1998		
Wyview Park Maintenance Bldg	WPMB		1997		
Wyview Park Multi-Purpose Bldg	WPMP		1998		
Wyview Park (WP01)	WP01		1998		
Wyview Park (WP02)	WP02		1998		
Wyview Park (WP03)	WP03		1998		
Wyview Park (WP04)	WP04		1998		
Wyview Park (WP05)	WP05		1998		
Wyview Park (WP06)	WP06		1998		
Wyview Park (WP07)	WP07		1998		
Wyview Park (WP08)	WP08		1998		
Wyview Park (WP09)	WP09		1998		
Wyview Park (WP10)	WP10		1998		
Wyview Park (WP11)	WP11		1998		
Wyview Park (WP12)	WP12		1998		
Wyview Park (WP13)	WP13		1998		
Wyview Park (WP14)	WP14		1998		
Wyview Park (WP15)	WP15		1998		
Wyview Park (WP16)	WP16		1998		
Wyview Park (WP17)	WP17		1998		
Wyview Park (WP18)	WP18		1998		
Wyview Park (WP19)	WP19		1998		
Wyview Park (WP20)	WP20		1998		
Wyview Park (WP21)	WP21		1998		
Wyview Park (WP22)	WP22		1998		
Wyview Park (WP23)	WP23		1998		
Wyview Park (WP24)	WP24		1998		
Wyview Park (WP25)	WP25		1998		
Wyview Park (WP26)	WP26		1998		
Wyview Park (WP27)	WP27		1998		
Wyview Park (WP28)	WP28		1998		
Wyview Park (WP29)	WP29		1998		
Wyview Park (WP30)	WP30		1998		

== Physical plants ==
Building	Abbr.	Image	Yr. Occ.	Notes	References
Physical Plant Buildings	PHPL		1988		
Physical Plant Acid Dilution Building	PPAD		1995		
Physical Plant Bag House	PPBH		1993		
Physical Plant Central Heating Plant	PPCH		1946	This building was designed by Joseph Nelson with Morris Snell superintending construction.	
Physical Plant Electrical Substation #1	PPE1		2004		
Physical Plant Electrical Substation #2	PPE2		2004		
Physical Plant Electrical Substation #3	PPE3		2004		
Physical Plant General Storage Building #1	PPS1		1982		
Physical Plant General Storage Building #2	PPS2		1982		
Physical Plant General Storage Building #3	PPS3		1982		
Physical Plant Greenhouse	PPGH		1963		
Physical Plant Grounds Change Building	PPGC		1983		
Physical Plant Grounds Equipment Building	PPGE		1973		
Physical Plant Grounds Materials Handling Storage	PG12		1983		
Physical Plant Grounds Office	PPGO		1963		
Physical Plant Grounds Storage – East Campus	PGEC		1996		
Physical Plant Grounds Storage – Heritage Halls	PGHR		1995		
Physical Plant Grounds Storage – Main Campus	PGMC		2008		
Physical Plant Grounds Storage – Materials Handling North	PGMN		1983		
Physical Plant Grounds Storage – Materials Handling South	PGMS		1983		
Physical Plant Grounds Storage – North Campus	PGNC		1980		
Physical Plant Grounds Storage – Parking Lot 6	PGP6		2008		
Physical Plant Grounds Storage – Root Cellar	PGRC		1946		
Physical Plant Grounds Storage – South Campus	PGSC		2008		
Physical Plant Grounds Storage – West Campus	PGWC		1925		
Physical Plant Grounds Storage – Wymount Terrace	PGWT		1997		
Physical Plant Grounds Truck Garage	PPGT		1982		
Physical Plant Motor Pool Car Wash	PPMW		1971		
Physical Plant Motor Pool Office Bldg	PPMO		1971		
Physical Plant Pump House (Canal)	PPPH		1960		
Physical Plant Service Station	PPSS		1980		
Physical Plant Telephone Node Station #3	PPT3		1999		
Physical Plant Telephone Node Station #4	PPT4		1999		

== Police and traffic buildings ==
The BYU Police Department has its headquarters in the Jesse Knight Building (JKB), which also has many classrooms and other academic functions, so it is listed under academic buildings above. However the following are buildings completely devoted to police and traffic-control functions.

Building	Abbr.	Image	Yr. Occ.	Notes	References
Traffic Control Booth #1 North	PBV1		1980		
Traffic Control Booth #2 East	PBV2		1980		
Traffic Control Booth #3 West	PBV3		1999		
Traffic Control Booth #4 South	PBV4		1999		
University Police Bike Storage	UPBS		2009		

== Service buildings ("B" buildings) ==
Building	Abbr.	Image	Yr. Occ.	Notes	References
B34 (Service Building)	B34		1952	This building was first built as a rifle range and used as such until 1969. It was then remodeled and used by the engineering department.	
B38 (Engineering Research Lab)	B38		1966		
B41 (Coal Combustion Research Lab)	B41		1966	Tracy Hall oversaw most of the experiments done in this building when it was first built.	
B45 (Geology Storage)	B45		1967	1,952 square feet	
B51 (Compressor Shed For Wind Tunnel)	B51		1970		
B57 (Dining Services Recreation Area Storage)	B57		1975		
B66 (Ceramics, Sculpture, Industrial Education Lab Building)	B66		1976		
B67 (Outdoors Unlimited)	B67		1985		
B73 (Service Building – Paint)	B73		1960		

== Storage buildings ==
Building	Abbr.	Image	Yr. Occ.	Notes	References
Cluff Building Storage Shed	CLF1		1955		
Cluff Building Storage Shed (Pink)	CLF2		2001		
Child & Family Studies Lab Playground Storage #1	CFS1		2005		
Child & Family Studies Lab Playground Storage #2	CFS2		2005		
Emergency Preparedness Storage Building	EPSB		1980		
Life Sciences Hay Shed #2	P40S		1987		

== Former buildings ==
Many structures that have been used by Brigham Young University in the past have either been sold or demolished. BYU had 354 buildings, 85 of which were designated temporary in August 1971. Only 127 of those are listed in either the above portion of this list or in the list on BYU housing. The rest of the list attempts to cover buildings that have been razed or sold.

Starting in 1957 BYU purchased large amounts of land to fill out the planned area of the campus. This included the purchase of approximately 100 houses. About 50 of these had been razed by 1973 but the other 50 or so were used for various purposes by the university at that time. While some of these houses are reported in this or other lists, others are not.

Building	Abbr.	Image	Yr. Occ.	Yr. Vac.	Notes	References
Academy Building			1892	1968	This was the main building of the campus when BYU adopted its current name in 1903. However, the building was south of the main campus. With the movement of the library to the upper campus in 1925 this building became more and more the education Building and the center of the Brigham Young High School. When BYHS was closed in 1968 BYU ended all use of the building. It was later sold to the city of Provo and is now the Provo Library at Academy Square.	
Allen Hall (Robert Eugene & Inez Knight)	ALLN		1938	2019	The Museum of Peoples and Cultures was located in Allen Hall, south of the main campus and largely surrounded by apartments mainly inhabited by BYU students until relocated in 2014. It has collections of anthropological materials, largely dealing with the indigenous inhabitants of the Americas. The building was demolished by BYU in 2019.	
Alumni House	ALUM		1961	2006	An 11,000-square-foot (1,000 m^{2}) building, this was razed to make space for the Gordon B. Hinckley Alumni and Visitors Center.	
Animal Science Farm	FARM		1946		This was a 24-acre piece of land purchased by BYU in 1946. It initially it had a house, a barn and a chicken coop. Later many war-surplus building no longer needed on the main campus were moved to this cite. Other buildings were built on this location. By the early 1970s the cite had over 53,000 square feet (4,900 m^{2}) of building.	
Arts Building			1904	1975	Located on the northwest corner of the block with the Academy Building. Originally called the Missionary and Preparation building because the Preparatory School for lower level older students and the programs to instruct LDS missionaries were held here. Emma Lucy Gates Bowen donated money towards the building which was used to make the third floor the location of the Home Economics Program. The floor was named after Lucy B. Young, Bowen's maternal grandmother. The building was rededicated in 1908 by John Henry Smith as the Arts Building. It was used by BYU into the 1970s.	
B-1 (Temporary Office Building)	B1		1954		This building was purchased from Fort Douglas and located where the Wilkinson Student Center Now is.	
B-17 (Engineering Analysis Maintenance)	B17		1956		Originally the location of the Physical Plant sheet metal shop when that relocated this became a building to analyze the maintenance of the university buildings from a structural standpoint.	
B-21 (Service Building - Auto Shop)	B21		1952	2010	This building was first used as the motor garage by BYU's Physical Plant. It later was used as the Mechanical Engineering Laboratory.	
B-23	B23		1954		This was used as a paint, upholstery and office equipment repair shop.	
B-24 (Physical Plant Equipment Shed)	B24		1956		Used to house materials for the Physical Plant.	
B-31 (Creamery and Laundry Building)	B31		1949		This building was the first location of the BYU Cremery, until the later creamery was built in 1964 and of BYU Laundry Services until the Laundry Building was completed in 1968. It was then remodeled into a building used for industrial education.	
B-32 (Service Building – Geology Collections)	B32		1948	2010	This building was first used by BYU receiving and as a motor pool garage. In 1968 a new building was built that housed these functions and this quonset hut was remodeled into an engineering laboratory.	
B-33 (Shops Washroom)	B33		1956		This was built as a bathroom for Physical Plant personnel who worked in the surrounding shops. In 1969 it was remodeled into the air-conditioning room for B-34	
B-35 (Engineering Machine Shop)	B35		1958	1973	Built to store machine tools used to build lab equipment for the Engineering Department. This building was adjacent to the Fletcher Building and 400 square feet (37 m^{2}). In 1960 and 1963 additions were built bringing the building to 2,300 square feet (210 m^{2}). In 1978 it was merged with the old Press Storage Building but was later razed to make way for the Clyde Building.	
B-37 (Press Paper Storage)	B37		1964		This building was built to store paper for use by BYU Press. When the University Press Building was built in 1968 it was structurally joined with the adjacent B35. In 1972 it was moved southwest of the Central Heating Plant and expanded. It was then known as the Research Machine Shop.	
B-39 (Zoological Research Laboratory)	B39		1958		Located next to the Clyde Building	
B-50 (Parasitology Research Laboratory)	B50		1971		This was built just south of BYU's rodeo grounds because the dogs used for the research were too loud to keep on campus.	
B-52	B52		1959		This is one of five buildings that former the Physical Plant Stockade, adjacent to the Animal Sciences Laboratory and used to house unneeded material, deemed too valuable to sell or scrap.	
B-53	B53		1959		(Same as B52 building above.)	
B-54	B54		1959		(Same as B52 building above.)	
B-55	B55		1959		(Same as B52 building above.)	
B-56	B56		1959		(Same as B52 building above.)	
B-72 (Building - LDS Foundation)	B72					
B-77 (Service Building - Former UVSC Building)	B77				Home of the institution now known as Utah Valley University. BYU bought the old building of this college when it moved to its current location in Orem. The building was used for various purposes, including some of BYU's computer operations and also for the Early Childhood Education program, then later after the SFLC was razed while the Joseph F. Smith Building was being built. This building was razed to make way for the Information Technology Building.	
Beaver Branch			1898	1908	This was the buildings of the former Fort Cameron in Beaver, Utah. It operated as a branch of BYA and then BYU until it became the separate Murdock Academy in 1908.	
Blacksmith Shop			1905		This building was the location of blacksmith classes at BYU from 1905 until 1921, when the classes were discontinued. It was at 50 East on 5th North in Provo, on the block south of the Academy Building. The classes were taught by Hans Anderson, an immigrant from Denmark. In 1918 William H. Snell supervised the expansion of the building to temporarily house other mechanical arts operations until the completion of what was later called the Brimhall Building. It was used for storage purposes by BYU and also the location of a garage and the Provo Book bindery for the next 25 years. In 1947 it was renovated into a chemistry lab building. In 1950 Chemistry classes moved to the Eyring Science Center, but starting in 1955 it was used for Brigham Young High School shop classes. In 1972 it was converted into the plastics laboratory for BYU's Industrial Technology Department.	
Boiler House			1911		Located on the hillside by the Maeser Building. It was originally wood but had a concrete exterior built by William H. Snell in 1934. It was not used as a boiler after 1946 but only for storage. Beginning in 1966 it was remodeled into the Nuclear Research Laboratory.	
BYU Motion Picture Studio			1958	1991	Located in Carterville which was later annexed into Provo, the building was first built in 1958 with 13,160 square feet (1,223 m^{2}). In 1964 a sound-stage was added, but this soon burned down. The sound stage was then rebuilt and after this the building contained 36,077 square feet (3,351.7 m^{2}). For much of its early years although a department of the university the motion picture studio was a nonteaching institution. In the 1980s its operations became more closely connected with other university functions. In 1991 the studio was separated from BYU and made an entity directly owned by the Church of Jesus Christ of Latter-day Saints.	
Central (Eldridge) Building			1896	1900	Location of the BYA Primary School, at 1st North and University in Provo	
Clay Tennis Courts by Brimhall Building			1914	1918	These courts were relocated when the Brimhall Building was built.	
Clay Tennis Court, Lower Campus			1911		Built on the academy block	
Cluff (Benjamin Jr.) Building (Plant Sciences Lab)	CLFB		1955	2011	This is the laboratory for various botanical departments of BYU. The building was designed so it could be expanded as needed, and both the building and the adjacent Greenhouses have been expanded multiple times since it was first built. In November 2011 it was announced this building would be razed to make room for a new life science building.	
College Building			1898	1975	This was an additional building built on the same block as the academy building. Later on it served as the main location for BYU's Drama Department. It also was the first site of the BYU bookstore. It was sold by the university along with the Academy Building.	
Crandall House East						
Crandall House West	CRWH					
Faculty Office Building	FOB		1968		This building began in the 1950s as ticket offices, but when the adjacent stadium was replaced by the Edwards Stadium, the old ticket offices were expanded and turned into the faculty office building.	It was demolished in 2019 to make way for a new building.
Greenhouse, Lower Campus			1913	1955	Besides use for growing plants this building was also used to keep BYU's cougar kitten mascots during the 1930s.	
Green Barn					Original site of BYU Motion picture studio. It was torn down to make room for the Wilkinson Center.	
Green House (old)				2011	Adjacent to the Cluff building, torn down in preparation for building of the new Life Sciences Building.	
Fletcher (Harvey L.) Building	FB		1953	2019	This building was originally built as the engineering building. The first phase had as its architect Lawrence D. Olpin and was built from July to October in 1953. It was originally a one-story building. Three of the four wings received a second story in 1954. Despite being intended for engineering, when it was first built it also housed the English and other departments due to the severe lack of adequate office space on campus. It was demolished March 2019.	
Harris (Franklin S.) Fine Arts Center	HFAC		1964	2023	Named after Franklin S. Harris, the 292,817 sq. ft. HFAC housed the School of Music, the Department of Theatre and Media Arts, the Department of Visual Arts, and the Division of Design and Production. It had various classrooms, as well as 53 practice rooms and four art galleries. The building also housed several concert and play halls, including the De Jong Concert Hall and the Madsen recital hall. It was torn down to make space for a new visual arts building in 2023.	
Industrial Arts Shop Building			1947	1964	A war-surplus building	
Information Booth			1965		Located on Bulldog Boulevard (1200 North) at the entrance of BYU, this booth was used as a location for giving information to campus visitors.	
Ironton Plant			1968	1976	BYU received this land as a donation from United States Steel with plans to build a research park. The land was located between Provo and Springville. After studying the cost of development it was decided that doing so was not within BYU's means so they sold the land to Billings Energy Research Corporation.	
Jacobs House						
Joseph Smith Memorial Building	JSMB		1941	1991	The Joseph Smith Memorial Building was the third building on the upper campus. It was the location of Religion Classes, as well as a ballroom and cafeteria. It was actually built along the lines of LDS Institute Buildings at other campuses. In 1990 it was razed to make way for the Benson Building after the new Joseph Smith Building had been built.	
Knight (Amanda) Hall	AKH		1939	2019	Originally used as a residence hall. Funded by the Jesse Knight Endowment Fund, and named for Jesse Knight's wife Amanda. Later it was part of the Language Training Mission of the LDS Church. For a time during the 2000s housed part of the Department of Visual Arts. The Foundation for Ancient Research and Mormon Studies and BYU's courses to teach non-English speakers English have also at times been based in Knight hall. In early 2019 BYU sold the Amanda Knight hall to a developer.	
Knight Mangum Building	KMB		1943	2008	Originally not part of BYU, the KMB was built by the National Youth Administration as an auto shop. It was purchased by the university in 1943 and was used as a women's dormitory. The building at that point consisted of the lower portion. From 1946 to 1952 an upper addition was built. Originally the upper portion was designated the Knight Mangum Building while the lower portion was designated the Social Hall. The Social Hall was used by the music department until the Harris Fine Arts Center was completed. After this the Language Training Mission (predecessor to the Missionary Training Center) moved in. After the LTM moved to the current site of the MTC, the Knight Mangum Building was used by the history department, the sociology department, the school of social work, all parts of the College of Family, Home and Social Sciences, the Joseph Fielding Smith Institute for LDS Church History, the BYU Young Ambassadors and also housed a computer lab. The building was specifically named after Lucy Jane (Jennie) Brimhall Knight (George H. Brimhall's daughter and Jesse Knight’s daughter-in-law) and Jennie Knight Mangum (Jesse Knight’s daughter), two sisters-in-law who were lifelong friends of the university.	
Laboratory Building (1885)			1885		This building was in the vicinity of what is now 6th South and University Avenue in Provo. It was on the lot of the ZCMI Warehouse being used as the main teaching building in the aftermath of the Lewis Building burning. It was a separate structure to prevent a repeat of the chemistry lab fire that had destroyed the Lewis Building.	
Ladies Gymnasium			1913	1976	Built to relieve crowding in other gym space on campus, the building served as one of the main locations for basketball games prior to the building of the George Albert Smith Field house. It was located directly across University Avenue from the Academy Building. BYU sold the building in 1976, after which various merchants tried to set up shop there, normally lasting only a few years at best.	
Lewis Building			1875	1884	Built as the J. W. Lewis store in 1867. Brigham Young purchased in shortly after that. Brigham Young gave it to Brigham Young Academy as part of the deed creating the academy. It burned down in 1884.	
Little Carnegie Hall	B-29		1948		Built of Lava Rock as 16-room practice facility for piano students, this building had poor internal sound barriers but was used until the Harris Fine Arts Center was built.	
Meat Science Laboratory					Part of BYU's old Provo farm complex as of the 1960s	
North Building			1947		Located on the current site of the Harold B. Lee Library, the North Building was a classroom building used primarily by the college of commerce. It was an old military barracks BYU had purchased and moved to this site.	
Old Grandstand					Located where the Joseph Smith Memorial Building later stood, this was used for watching baseball.	
Oliver House (Performing Arts Management)	OLVH		1964	2013	Demolished in 2013. see	
Page School			1958	1998	This was a former school of the Alpine School District. BYU purchased the school mainly for the land it was on but it was used for various functions until it was razed during the construction of the University Parkway Center.	
Parking and Traffic Services Building	PTSB					
Physical Plant and AFROTC Building	B-15		1947	1968	This structure was also for a time the home of the BYU bookstore.	
Physical Plant Stores	B-19		1947		This was used as an office and storage location by the BYU Physical Plant Department.	
Pleasant View Chapel			1971		This building and its acre of land was purchased by BYU in 1971. It had previously been used by the Pleasant View LDS Ward. Four students branches met in the building but the main reason to purchase it was to expand the parking lot for Lavell Edwards Stadium.	
Potato Cellar			1942	1952	This was built to house farm produce grown on BYU's upper campus prior to the building of most of the campus buildings. It was removed in 1952 to make room for the academic buildings being built.	
Press Building			1947	1968	This was a government surplus building used to house the BYU Press until the completion of the University Press Building.	
Probert Building			1895	1912	This was used for classes that would not fit in the Academy Building. After BYU sold it in 1912 it was used for multiple purposes, including as a Kentucky Fried Chicken beginning in 1966.	
Religion Office Building	B-21		1947	1968	This was the first location of the BYU Health Center and then was used as an office building for BYU College of Religion faculty, until it was razed to make way for the John A. Widtsoe Building.	
Smith (Joseph F.) Family Living Center	SFLC		1957	2002	Named after Joseph F. Smith, the SFLC was razed to make space to build the new Joseph F. Smith Building (JFSB) which was completed in 2005. The building was designed with areas for the study of cooking, sewing, early childhood development as well as the psychology and sociology departments. The School of Nursing was also housed in the SFLC when it was first built. In additions to this, the campus telephone exchange was located in the building's basement. The Living center had areas named for Leah D. Widtsoe, the wife of John A. Widtsoe who was an early backer of the project, and she herself was a domestic science graduate of BYU and had been head of the department. The area named for Mrs. Widtsoe was the multipurpose room. Other named areas were Effie Warnick Homemaking Education Room, the Marion C. Pfund (dean) Experimental Food Laboratory, the Mary W. Hunt Small Dining Room, the Elizabeth C. Sauls Quantity Food Laboratory, the May Billings Advanced Clothing Construction Laboratory, the Margaret Vilate Elliot History of Costume Room, and the Zina Y. Williams Card Free Sewing Laboratory.	
Speech Center				1961	This building was on the current site of the Ernest L. Wilkinson Student Center and was razed to make room for that building.	
Stadium House			1936	1964	This was built on the west side of the old Stadium. It was torn down in 1964 to make way for the Stephen L. Richards Building.	
Student Project Laboratory Building					Located at about 1325 North in Provo, this was part of the BYU farm complex that was purchased in 1954.	
Thomas (Rex) House (Risk Management & Safety)	TOMH		1961			
Training Building			1902	1975	This was a lower-campus building. It was built to house the training school associated with the BYU Normal College and also had the universities first gymnasium.	
Waite House	WAIH			2009	This building was originally purchased by FARMS prior to its merger with BYU. It was also designated as the location of ISPART. It has been razed, and recent aerial photos show empty land where it once stood.	
Widtsoe (John A.) Building	WIDB		1970	2014	Housed College of Biology. There was a collection of about 40 marine tanks in the underground area of the building with sea animals anybody could view. It was replaced in September 2014 by the new Life Sciences Building. After crews spent several weeks of removing hazardous material from the building, it was demolished beginning May 21, 2015.	
Wymount Chapel	B-20		1947	1962	This was originally used as the construction office for Wymount Village. It was then the meetinghouse where the LDS branch consisting of the residents of that BYU housing project attended church. It was later used by BYU's Physical Plant Department.	
Wymount Dining Hall	B-16		1947	1971	After it was no longer used as a cafeteria this building was used for engineering classrooms, biochemistry research and chemicals storage.	

=== Rented and limited-use buildings ===
These buildings have been used by Brigham Young University or Brigham Young Academy, but were never owned by the school.

Building	Yr. Occ.	Yr. Vac.	Notes	References
Creer Building	1971		This building was rented by the Harold B. Lee Library for storage of less-used books beginning in 1971 due to inadequate space in the library. The library was expanded later in the 1970s. It was located at 744 South on 1st East Street in Provo.	
First National Bank Building	1884	1884	This building was used immediately after the Lewis Building burned.	
Provo Meetinghouse	1884	1884	This was another location used in wake of the Lewis Building fire. It was on the location where the Provo Tabernacle was later built.	
Provo Tabernacle	1900	2010	BYU used this building for Lyceums, commencement exercises, concerts and the like. It was BYU's only auditorium until 1941. Though always controlled directly by the LDS Church it was used for various BYU functions until it burned. It is now a temple owned and operated by the LDS church. The temple opened to the general public on Monday, January 4, 2016 at 10:00 a.m.	
S. S. Jones Store	1884	1884	Another location used after the fire	
Smoot Drug Store	1884	1884	This was used when the space provided in the First National Bank Building was not large enough	
St. Francis School	1972	1975	This was a former Catholic grade school that BYU rented from the Catholic Church to use as the location of the J. Reuben Clark Law School until the current law school building was completed.	
Z.C.M.I. Warehouse	1885		In the fall of 1884 most of the Brigham Young Academy functions were consolidated into this building.	

== Notes ==
- Blank cells indicate missing information
- "Abbr." = abbreviation; "Yr. Occ." = year occupied; "Yr. Vac." = year vacated
