= Eyring =

Eyring is a surname. Notable people with the surname include:

- Carl F. Eyring (1889–1951), American acoustic physicist
- Henry Eyring (chemist) (1901–1981), Mexican-born American theoretical chemist
- Henry Eyring (Mormon pioneer) (1835–1902)
- Henry B. Eyring (born 1933), American educator and leader in The Church of Jesus Christ of Latter-day Saints
- Henry J. Eyring (born 1963), president of Brigham Young University, Idaho

== See also ==
- Eyring equation, an equation in chemical kinetics
