= Henry Eyring =

Henry Eyring may refer to:

- Henry Eyring (chemist) (1901–1981), Mexican-born American theoretical chemist
- Henry Eyring (Mormon pioneer) (1835–1902), German Mormon convert and emigrant to the U.S., then Mexico
- Henry B. Eyring (born 1933), American academic and leader in The Church of Jesus Christ of Latter-day Saints
- Henry J. Eyring (born 1963), American university administrator
