= JKB =

JKB may refer to:

- Jesse Knight Building
- Jordan Kuwait Bank
- Jüdischer Kulturbund
- J. K. Bracken's GAC
