= Gordon B. Hinckley Alumni and Visitors Center =

Gordon B. Hinckley Alumni & Visitors Center
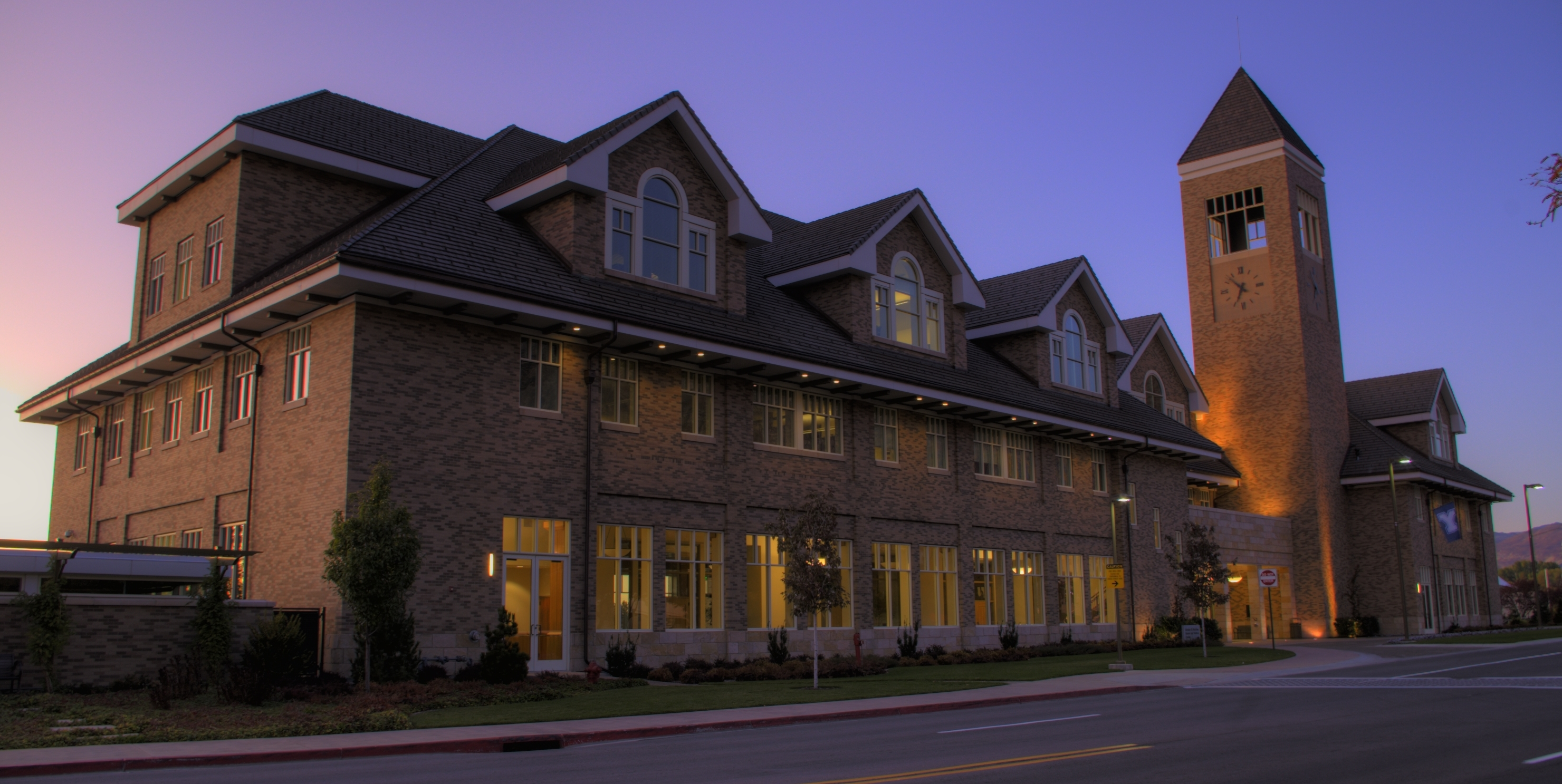
- Interactive map of the Gordon B. Hinckley; Alumni & Visitors Center area

General information
- Type: Educational
- Location: Provo, Utah
- Coordinates: 40°15′06″N 111°39′06″W
- Construction started: June 23, 2006
- Completed: June 23, 2007

Technical details
- Floor count: 3
- Floor area: 83,000 square feet (7,700 m^{2}) (7,432 sq. m)

Design and construction
- Architect: FFKR Architects
- Main contractor: Okland Construction; Span Construction

The Gordon B. Hinckley Alumni and Visitors Center is a three-story building named for Gordon B. Hinckley which houses alumni association offices on the Brigham Young University (BYU) campus in Provo, Utah.

The building acts as a visitors center, contains exhibits showcasing BYU's history, features a small theater, and houses alumni association offices for the university. BYU University Relations and BYU High School Relations are located in the building and give complimentary tours to campus visitors.

== History ==
In autumn 2005, BYU announced plans to raise money for a new alumni center named for Hinckley, the fifteenth president of the Church of Jesus Christ of Latter-day Saints (LDS Church). In 2006, BYU's existing alumni building, the Alumni House, was demolished 44 years and one day after it was dedicated.

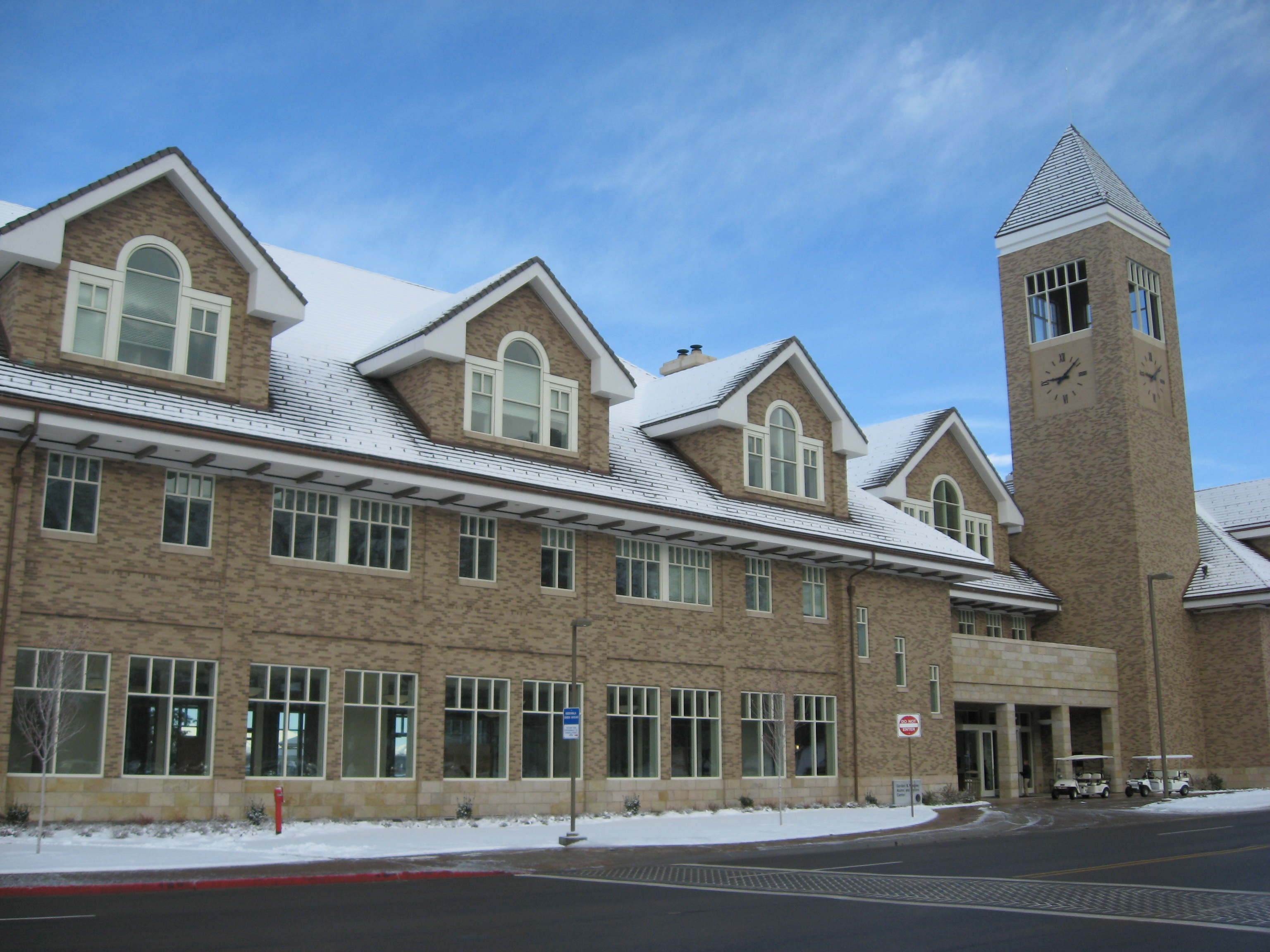
Building in winter

On June 23, 2006, Hinckley's 96th birthday, ground was broken for the building. Hinckley was joined by university administrators, other BYU trustees, and donors. He opted to use a well-worn shovel chosen from his own garden tools rather than the ceremonial blue and white shovels used by other participants, which was later donated to the visitors center after its completion.

The building was completed and dedicated exactly one year from the date of the groundbreaking, June 23, 2007, and construction was completed sooner than expected. Hinckley and other LDS Church leaders attended the dedication where items—including Hinckley's hammer and cuff links—were added to a time capsule. The $35 million project was paid for entirely from donations of over 70,000 individuals including 8,000 students and 49,000 alumni.

== Design ==
At 83,000 square feet (7,432 sq. m), the building has three stories and a lower level. It includes a clocktower, which rises 122 feet, and due to its elevation, the building is highly visible from the campus when one is approaching the campus. The building was installed with 153 windows, 800 tons of steel, 4,573 cubic yards of concrete, and crews used 130 tones of sandstone from a Heber quarry and 310 tons of brick to create the exterior. One of the two construction companies involved with the building, Span Construction, is owned by King Husein, a BYU alumnus.
