= Eyring Science Center =

Carl F. Eyring Science Center
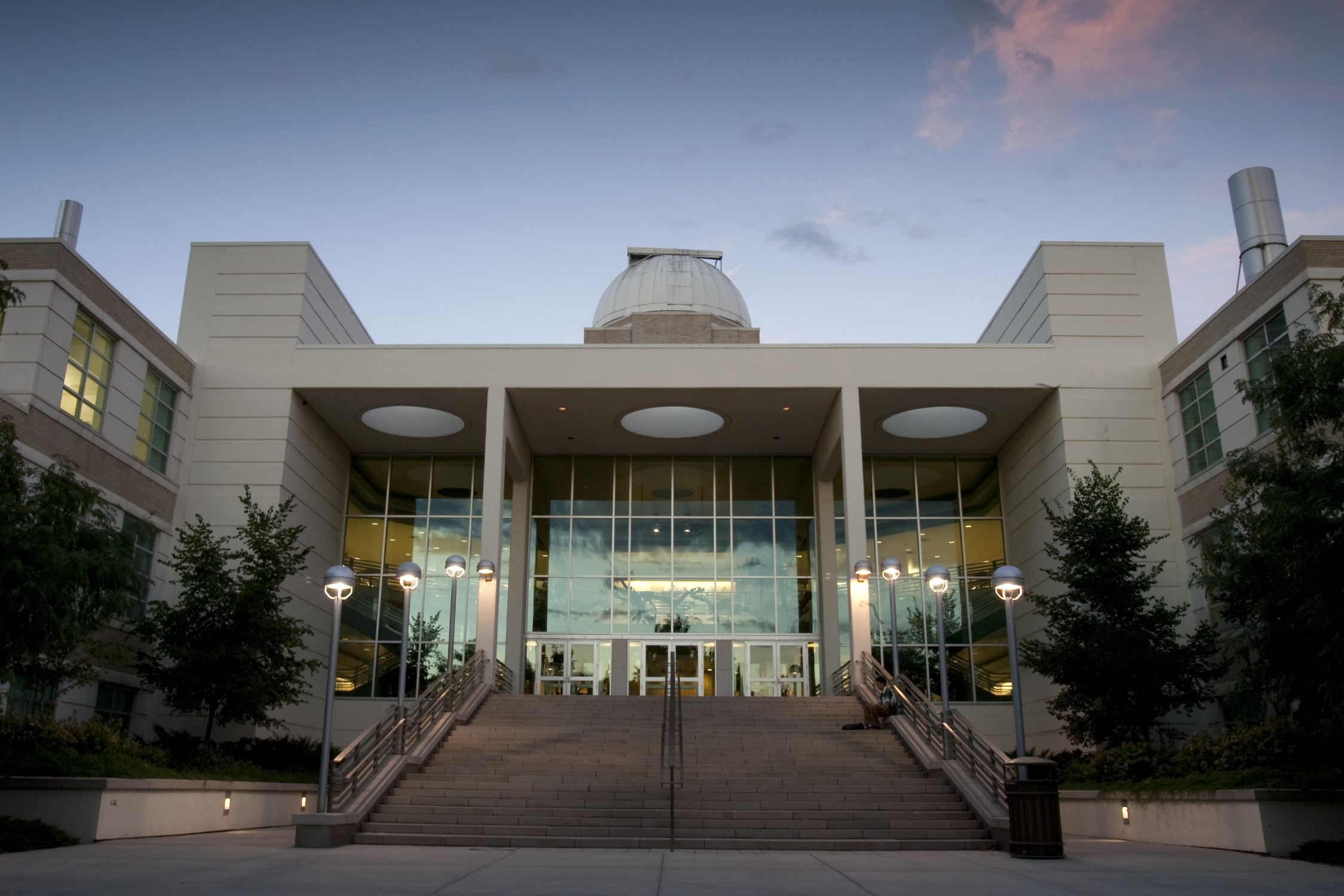
- Eyring Science Center, August 2005
- Interactive map of the Carl F. Eyring Science Center area

General information
- Type: Educational
- Location: Provo, Utah; United States
- Coordinates: 40°14′49″N 111°39′00.9″W
- Named for: Carl F. Eyring
- Completed: 1950

Design and construction
- Architect: Fred L. Markham

The Carl F. Eyring Science Center (ESC) is one of the science buildings on the Brigham Young University (BYU) campus in Provo, Utah, United States. It was built in 1950 and named after Carl F. Eyring in 1954.

== Description ==
The ESC houses the departments of Physics and Astronomy, Geology, and Food Science and Nutrition. The Department of Chemistry has in the past been located at the ESC but is not currently headquartered there.

In 1968, an underground physics research lab was added to the north end of the building. Research on plasma, atomic processes, lasers, high-pressure physics, nanotechnology, acoustics, and cold fusion have been conducted here. It is the home of two modern TEMs.

The Royden G. Derrick Planetarium is also in the building. This 119-seat facility with a 39-foot (12 m) acoustically-treated dome was built in 2005 to replace the smaller, outdated Sarah Barrett Summerhays Planetarium. In the summer of 2006, a new dome was installed on the ESC's observatory to better allow for astronomical study on campus. The building also has several acoustics labs including two anechoic chambers and two reverberation chambers for performing acoustics research.

The 5th and 6th floors of the ESC constitute the Orson Pratt Observatory.

In the early years of the ESC, James A. Jensen's dinosaur displays were often in the lobby. However, since the building of the BYU Earth Science Museum, dinosaur displays are less common.

The main lobby of the building is noted for its Foucault pendulum. It also houses a student-run restaurant, the Pendulum Court, during the fall and winter semesters.

The ESC was the first building at BYU to have an elevator.

== See also ==
- List of Brigham Young University buildings
- List of science centers
