= Clyde Engineering Building =

One of the engineering buildings on BYU campus

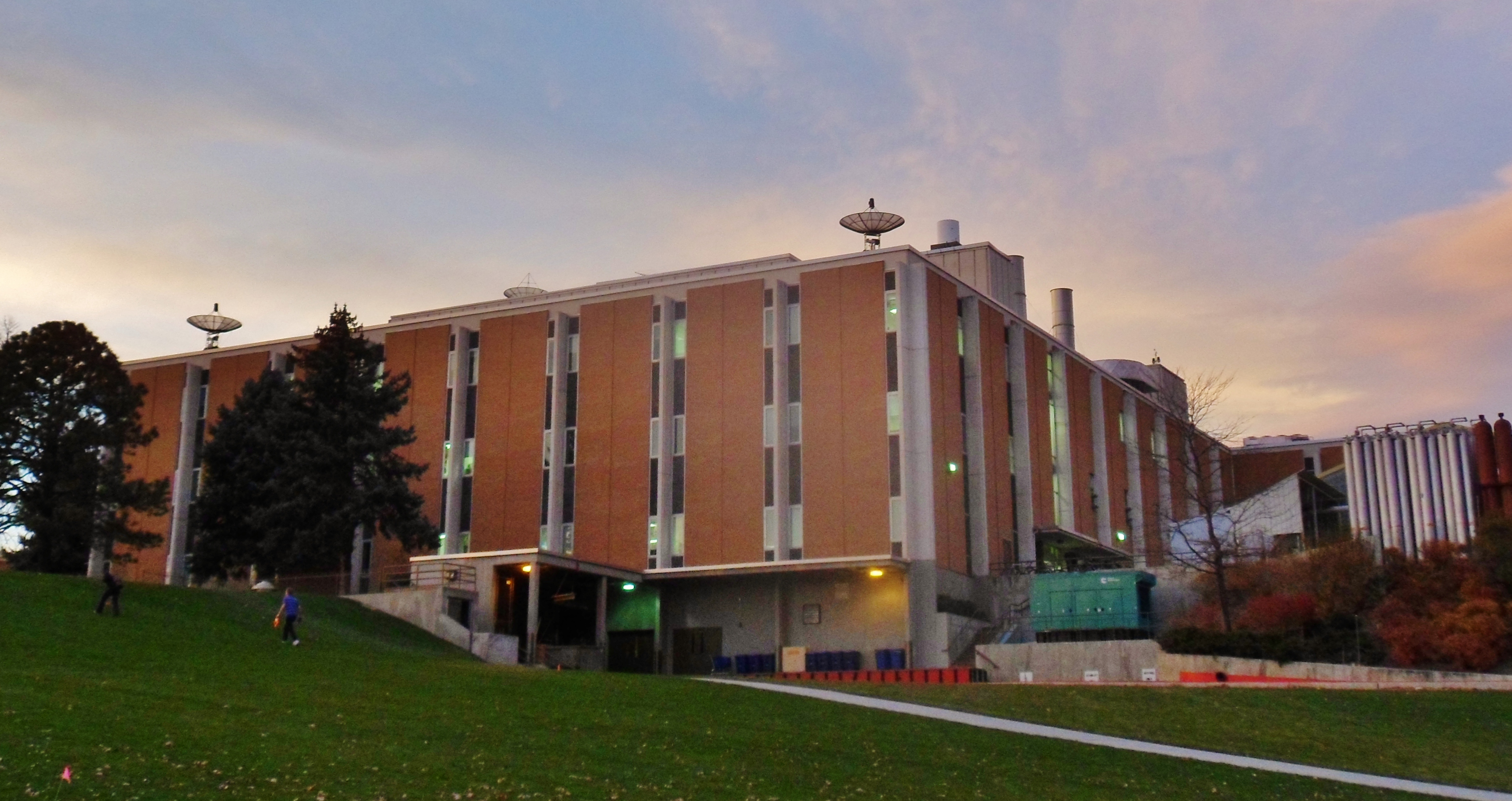
- Interactive map of the Clyde Engineering Building area

General information
- Type: Educational
- Location: Provo, Utah
- Coordinates: 40°14′48″N 111°38′52″W
- Completed: 1974

The Clyde Engineering Building is one of the engineering buildings on the Brigham Young University (BYU) campus. It houses the Civil and Environmental Engineering, Chemical Engineering, and Electrical Engineering departments. The building is named after Wilford W. Clyde, a Springville, Utah construction business owner and generous donor to BYU.

The structure contains a large study lounge and many classrooms. Over 40% of the floor space is dedicated to laboratory instruction and research. The structure contains an auditorium, several computer labs, a structures lab with large I-beams and a crane, a soil mechanics lab, environmental lab, transportation lab, a solid-state clean room, and various faculty and graduate student offices.

== See also ==
- List of Brigham Young University buildings
- Ira A. Fulton College of Engineering and Technology
