= Ira A. Fulton College of Engineering =

Engineering college

Coordinates: 40°15′N 111°39′W

- Type: Private
- Established: 1953/1972
- Affiliations: The Church of Jesus Christ of Latter-day Saints
- Dean: Michael A. Jensen
- Location: Provo, Utah, United States
- Campus: Brigham Young University
- Website: engineering.byu.edu

The Ira A. Fulton College of Engineering represents Brigham Young University's (BYU) engineering discipline and includes departments of chemical & biological, civil & construction, electrical & computer, manufacturing, and mechanical engineering along with the technology and engineering studies program. The college awards about 700 degrees every year (600 BS, 90 MS, 18 PhD) and has almost 3,600 students.

== History ==
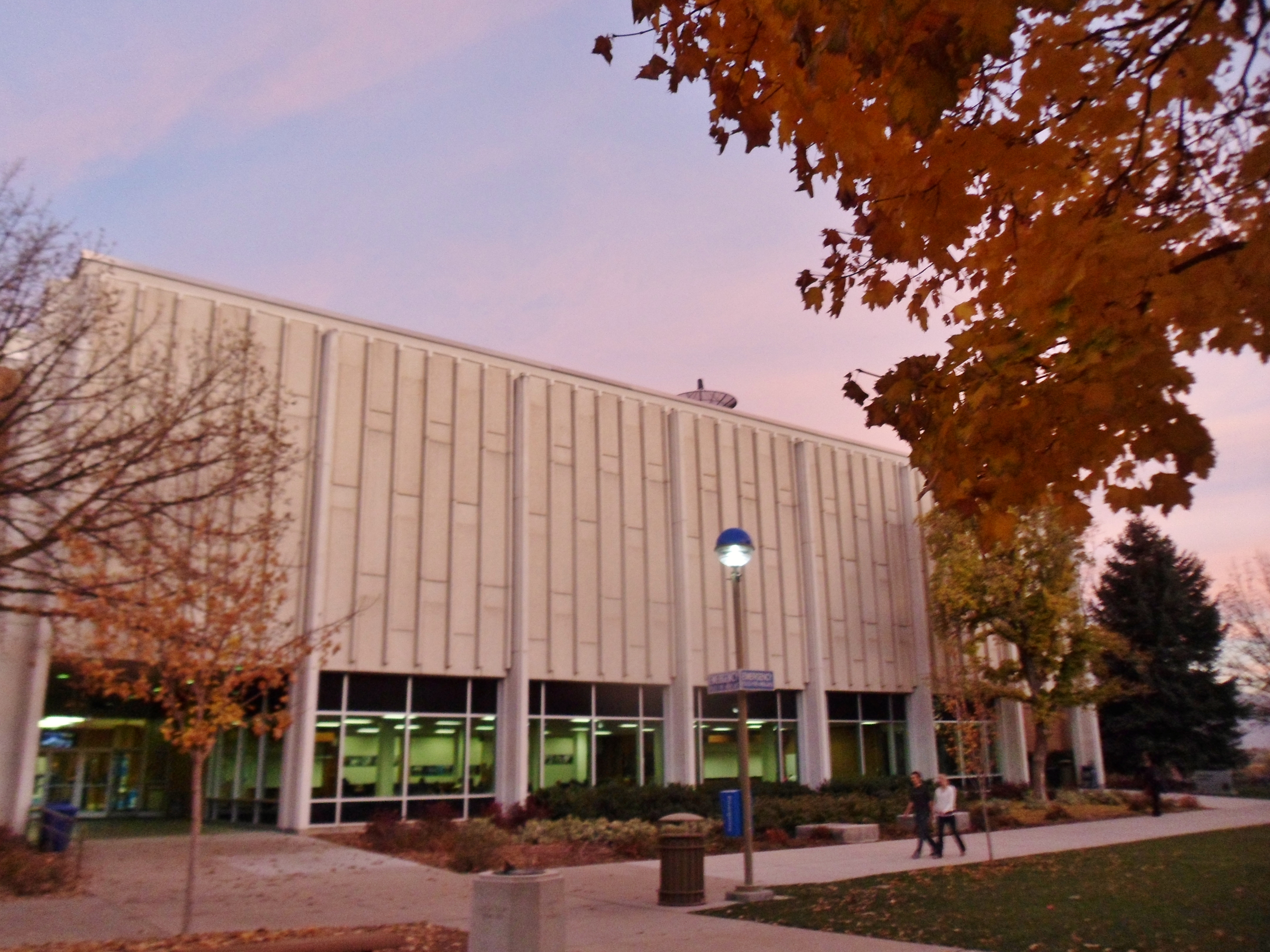
The Clyde building

The college has roots going back to the introduction of Brigham Young Academy, but its more official beginning occurred when the first dean, Harvey Fletcher, organized the engineering program at BYU in 1952. This was the department of engineering science that, at the time, was part of the BYU College of Arts and Sciences. By 1965, there were four engineering departments (chemical, physical, civil and electrical), with enrollment at the median compared to engineering schools in the United States. By 1969, enrollment had reached the 70th percentile. The college has continued to expand, and now includes five main facilities for its students: the Engineering Building, Engineering Research Laboratory and the Clyde, Crabtree and Snell buildings. Fletcher's design of the acoustics for the DeJong Concert Hall of the College of Fine Arts at BYU is at times attributed to this college since Fletcher was the first head of the engineering department. However, since acoustics is a sub-field of physics it is also possible to attribute that work more to the College of Physical and Engineering Sciences, which is where both physics and engineering were housed at that time. That college is a partial ancestor of the College of Engineering but also of the BYU College of Physical and Mathematical Sciences.

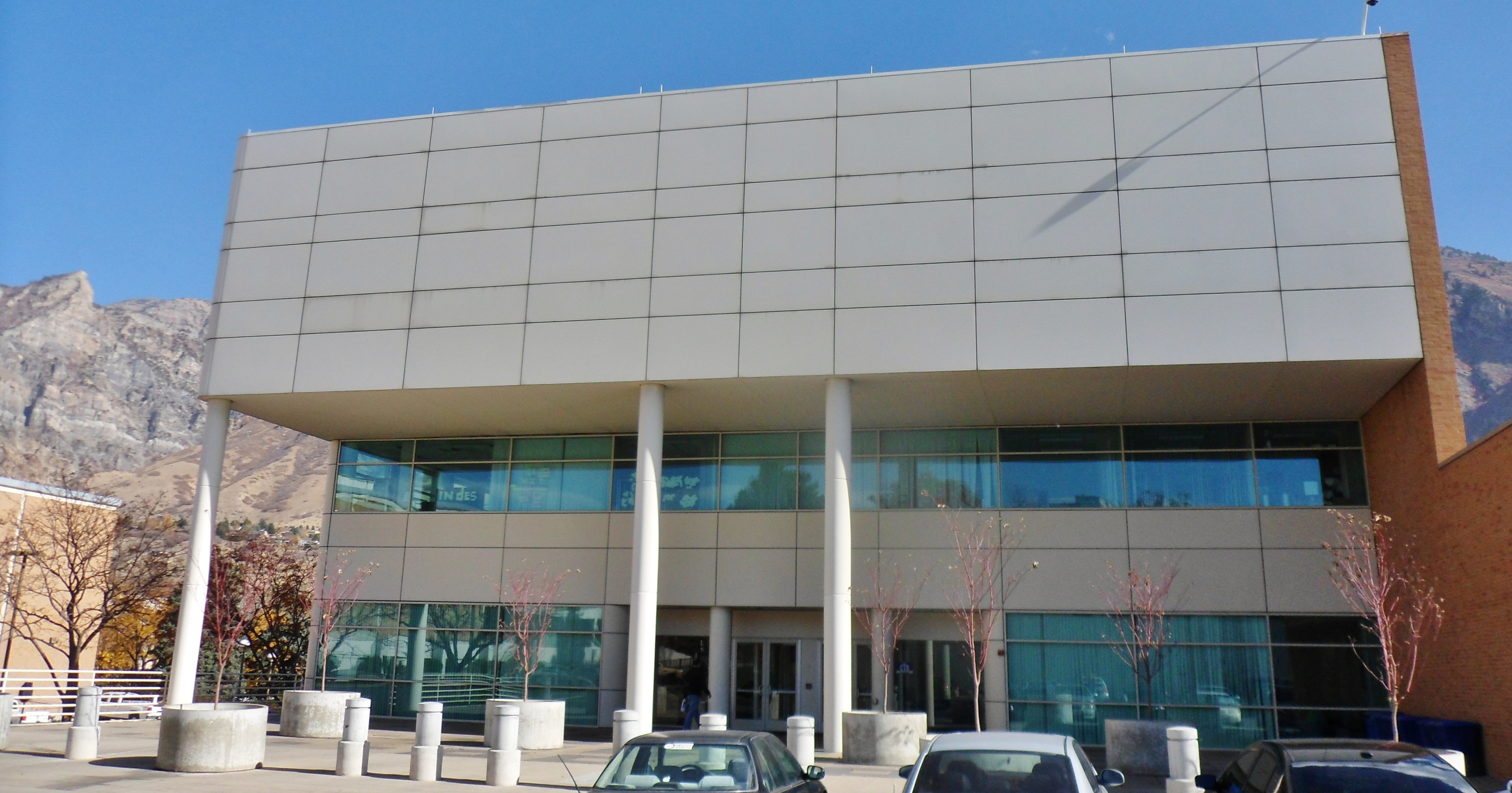
The Crabtree building

The Ira A. Fulton College of Engineering was formed in 1972 by merging the four engineering departments from the College of Physical and Engineering Sciences, which was then renamed the college of Physical and Mathematical Sciences with most of the College of Industrial and Technical Education.

The College of Industrial and Technical Education was formed in 1965 when it was split from the General College, which was separated from the College of Biological and Agricultural Sciences in 1957. The placement of technical and industrial education in a college labeled Biological and Agricultural Sciences had arguably never been entirely logical. It did make a little sense considering one possible program was vocational agriculture, but the general disconnect between the terminology and the actual programs probably explains why the industrial and technical education programs had only been in the College of Biology and Agriculture for three years. Before 1954, what became the college of Biology and Agriculture had along with what became the College of Family Living, which in turn was a predecessor of the College of Family, Home and Social Sciences been the college of Applied Science. Under this name the inclusion of technical education programs had made sense.

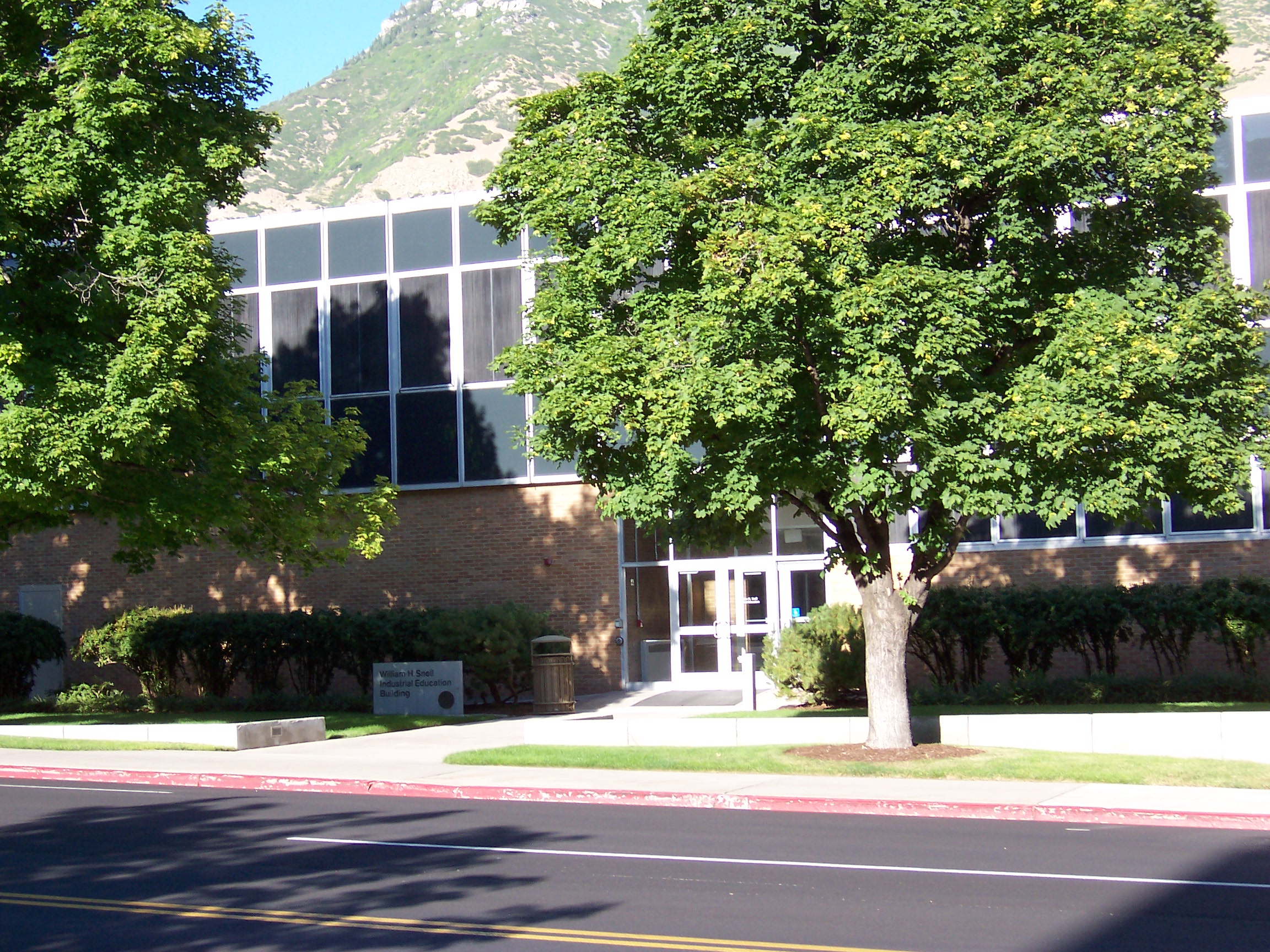
The Snell building

The specific origins of the College of Engineering Sciences was the Mechanical Arts department. This was organized as a separate department in 1921, although the first teacher at BYU to give classes in subjects related to this department had been Karl G. Maeser (in many ways the intellectual father of BYU). In 1951, the department was renamed from Mechanical Arts to Industrial Arts. In 1952, it was renamed to Industrial Arts and Drawing. In 1955, the department was divided into the Industrial Education Department with the focus on training teachers to either teach at technical and industrial schools or to teach vocational education, popularly known as "shop", classes in high schools or junior high school on the one hand, and the Technical and Professional Institute which in many ways functioned as a two-year technical college within the four-year university. This Technical and Professional institute offered classes in various fields such as printing and physical plant administration that would prepare students for jobs in these fields. The institute also included such programs as the associate degree in nursing program which was at this point kept separate from the College of Nursing because the ability of the College of Nursing to receive full accreditation would have been undermined if it had included an associate degree program.

In 1972, when the new College of Engineering and Technology was formed, some programs that had been in the old College of Industrial and Technical Education were not included in the new college. Among these was the associate degree in nursing program which was moved to the College of Nursing, both due to a decision to make it easier to move from the associates to bachelors in nursing programs and in part because of changing attitudes by the accrediting bodies on nursing education that made it possible to now offer both associates and bachelors level nursing programs under the same general heading. The College was also part of establishing the award winning BYU Center for Animation.

In 2016, ground was broken for a new building for the College of Engineering and alumnus King Husein was the Volunteer Fundraising Committee chair for the new $80 million building. In September 2018, the Ira A. Fulton College of Engineering & Technology shortened its name to the Ira A. Fulton College of Engineering.

== Current status and research ==
The college currently includes many different research areas. The college was renamed in 2003 to honor Ira A. Fulton, an Arizona businessman, who donated money to the college. Arizona State University's Ira A. Fulton School of Engineering is also named for Fulton. With those donations, the college was able to purchase a supercomputer that is used for research by the college and the BYU campus community.

Some of the many research projects with which the college is involved include the MAGICC lab and the Electric Vehicle Racing team. The MAGICC Lab is involved with designing automated devices such as robots and unmanned air vehicles. The team has worked in conjunction with military contractors, and the team has continually placed at competitions involving unmanned aerial vehicles (UAV). The Electric Vehicle Racing team has worked in conjunction with National Instruments and has designed high power electric racing vehicles used for competitions.

The college received rankings in U.S. News & World Report's 2005 report placing it at 81st in the US. Specifically, mechanical engineering was ranked 53rd and electrical and computer engineering was ranked 68th in their respective graduate programs. The programs offered by the college are accredited by ABET and other organizations.

== Degrees offered ==
Department of Chemical & Biological Engineering (CBE)

- BS — chemical engineering
- MS — chemical engineering
- PhD — chemical engineering
- MS/MBA — joint program between CBE and the BYU Marriott School of Business

Department of Civil and Construction Engineering (CCE)

- BS — civil engineering
- MS — civil engineering
- PhD — civil engineering
- BS — construction and facilities management: construction management
- BS — construction and facilities management: facility and property management
- MS — construction engineering management

Department of Electrical & Computer Engineering (ECE)

- BS — electrical engineering
- BS — computer engineering
- MS — electrical and computer engineering
- PhD — electrical and computer engineering
- BS — cybersecurity
- MS — IT & cybersecurity

Department of Manufacturing Engineering (MFGEN)

- BS — manufacturing engineering
- MS — manufacturing engineering
- MS/MBA — joint program between MFGEN and the BYU Marriott School of Business

Department of Mechanical Engineering (ME)

- BS — mechanical engineering
- BS — mechanical engineering: aerospace
- MS — mechanical engineering
- PhD — mechanical engineering
- MS/MBA — joint program between ME and the BYU Marriott School of Business

Technology and Engineering Studies Program (TES)

- BS — technology and engineering studies: teaching
- BS — technology and engineering studies: technical
- MS — technology and engineering education

== Sources ==
- Ernest L. Wilkinson, ed., Brigham Young University:The First 100 Years (Provo: BYU Press, 1975) Vol. 2, p. 782-786.
