= Jesse Knight Building =

Jesse Knight
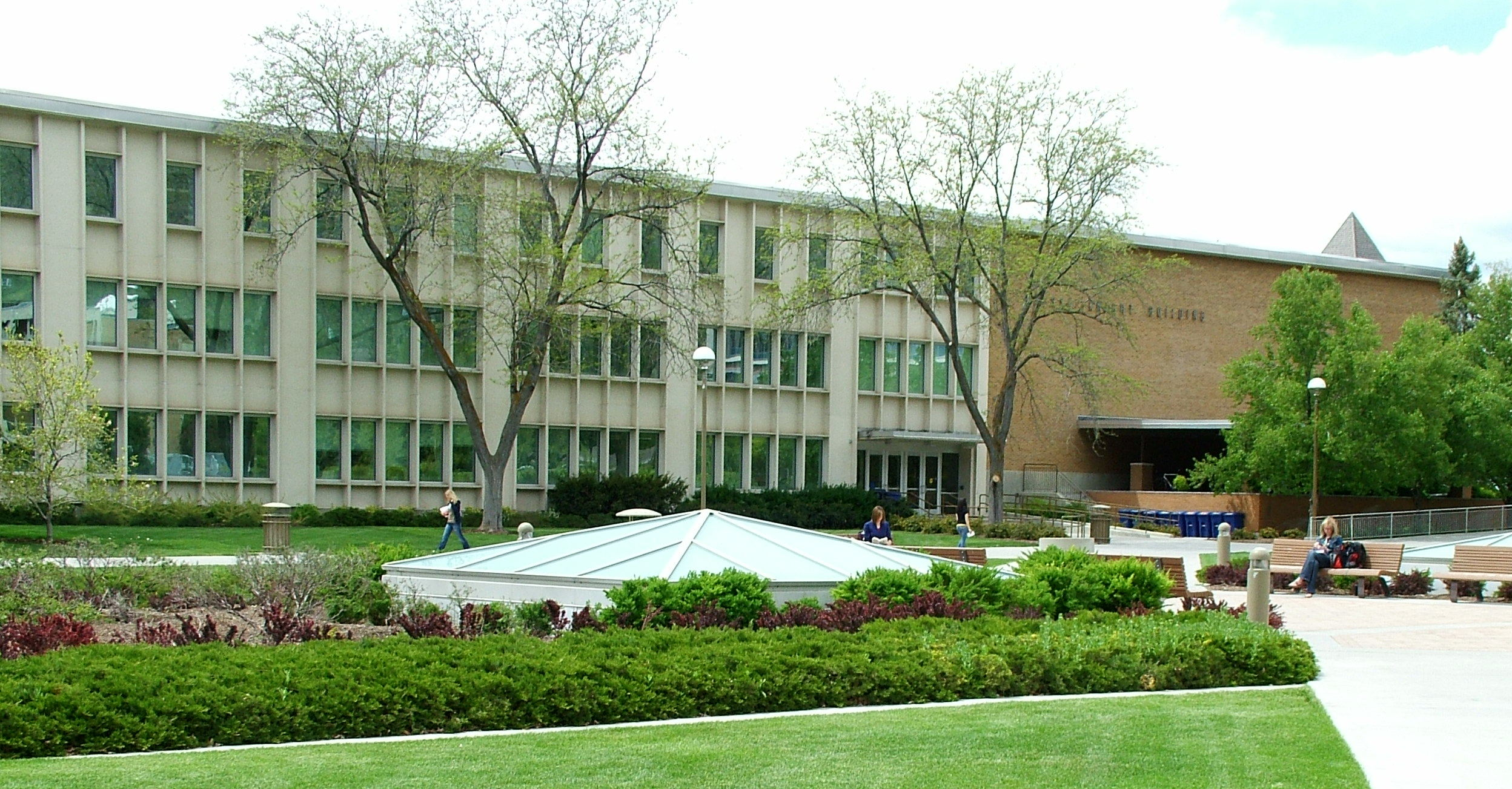

General information
- Type: Educational
- Location: Provo, Utah
- Coordinates: 40°14′59.47″N 111°38′59.89″W
- Completed: 1960

The Jesse Knight Building, also known as the JKB, is a building that houses classrooms on the Brigham Young University campus to Provo, Utah.

Built in 1960 and named after Jesse Knight, the building was first occupied by the BYU Commercial College (or business school). When it was first built the Jesse Knight Building was the business building. It was significantly expanded in 1966. After the Tanner Building was built, the Jesse Knight building became the location of the College of Humanities. However, with the completion of the new Joseph F. Smith building in 2005 some humanities functions were shifted out of the Jesse knight Building, and some non-humanities institutions have moved into the building, so it is no longer known as the Jesse Knight Humanities Building (JKHB) as it was for many years. Currently the Jesse Knight building is the location of the BYU Police, Freshman Academy administration, Human Resource Development, the Visual Arts department (in the BYU College of Fine Arts and Communications), the English Writing Center, the Humanities Publications Center, School of Management computer laboratories, and classrooms.

== Design ==
The Knight Building originally consisted only of its eastern portion running north and south. The eastern arm annex was added to the building in 1966. In 2007 the building underwent "seismic upgrades and other renovations".

== See also ==
- List of Brigham Young University buildings
