= King Husein =

Indian-American engineer and construction company executive

- Born: Firoz Mohamed Husein; Mumbai, India
- Citizenship: United States
- Occupations: Founder and CEO; Span Construction and Engineering
- Known for: Steel Building Construction
- Children: 4

King Husein is an Indian-American engineer and the founder and CEO of Span Construction and Engineering (Span), one of the country's largest metal building construction companies based in Madera, California.

Husein was born in Mumbai, India into a Muslim family. His father died when he was 11, and his mother raised the four children on money she earned teaching embroidery on foot-powered Singer sewing machines. He completed his bachelor's degree in Civil Engineering from University of Mumbai. Originally, he was slated to attend Rice University, but based on the recommendation of a friend, he diverted to Provo, Utah, and enrolled at Brigham Young University (BYU). He obtained a master's in structural engineering in 1971 from BYU.

Husein started his career in Boston and was hired by Priggen Steel Buildings, affiliated with Varco Pruden Buildings, and then moved west to work for a builder in Fresno, California, in 1977.

== Span Construction and Engineering ==
Span was founded in 1980. Husein developed a suspension safety net system called SkyWeb. The company's culture includes the principle, “Keep our commitments – at all cost”. Span will also never do work on Sundays. As of January 1, 2018, 100% of the company's stock was sold to its employees through an Employee Stock Ownership Plan (ESOP).

As of 2020, Span has built over 187 million square feet of buildings. For more than 20 years, Span has been rated the largest metal building contracting company in the country.

=== Costco ===
In 1988, Husein met with Doug Mulvanny, MulvannyG2 Architects, which was responsible for Costco construction. Husein related the pivotal meeting, "He asked me a question that was a turning point. The building is 500,000 square feet and 52 feet high. He asked me how would I devise a bracing without any interior bracing that would restrict the movements inside. I said I would provide straps on top of the structure that would take all the forces outside to the walls. His eyes lit and he ended up putting us on the bidding list. That was a game changer."

In October 1989, Mulvanny hired Span for its first Costco project in Redding, California. Husein related, "Once we did that project, Doug took the executive vice president of Costco and showed him how a standing seam roof system worked. On the way down from the roof, the executive vice president said, 'Mulvanny, let's switch all our building to steel.'" Span has built Costco stores throughout North America, including several stores in Canada and Mexico, as well as the United Kingdom, Taiwan and Australia.

== Personal life ==
Husein is married to Diane Clark, from Star Valley, Wyoming, and they have four children. Husein is a member of the Church of Jesus Christ of Latter-day Saints. Husein donated $5 million to the Ira A. Fulton College of Engineering in 2020 and funded the King and Diane Husein Endowed Professorship in Civil & Environmental Engineering since 2002. Husein served as the Volunteer Fundraising Committee chair for the new $80 million BYU Engineering Building.

In 2021, Husein donated 50 acres of land, "valued at nearly $9 million", to the Madera Unified School District. A K-8 school named The King Husein School is expected to open on the site in August 2026.
