= Ezra Taft Benson Agriculture and Food Institute =

The Ezra Taft Benson Agriculture and Food Institute is a 501(c)(3) organization owned by the Church of Jesus Christ of Latter-day Saints (LDS Church) and operated as a subdivision of the Church's Welfare Department that has as its goal the improvement of the nutrition and health of the rural poor.

The Institute was originally formed as part of the Brigham Young University (BYU) College of Biology and Agriculture in 1975. It was named for Ezra Taft Benson, a U.S. Secretary of Agriculture, president of the LDS Church, and an advocate for the well being of farmers. The institute still maintains ties to BYU but in January 2008 it separated organizationally from BYU and became part of the LDS Church's Welfare Program.

The Benson Institute has focused on Ecuador, Bolivia, Mexico, Guatemala, Morocco, and Ghana.

While part of BYU the Benson Institute was housed in B-49, which is now the home of the Neal A. Maxwell Institute for Religious Scholarship. This building is at the south-west corner of 5th East and 8th North in Provo, Utah. After joining the LDS Church Welfare Department it moved to the LDS Church Office Building in Salt Lake City.

The Institute for Self-Reliant Agriculture was organized by a group of former Benson Institute staff applying the same principles.
