= Carl F. Eyring =

American physicist

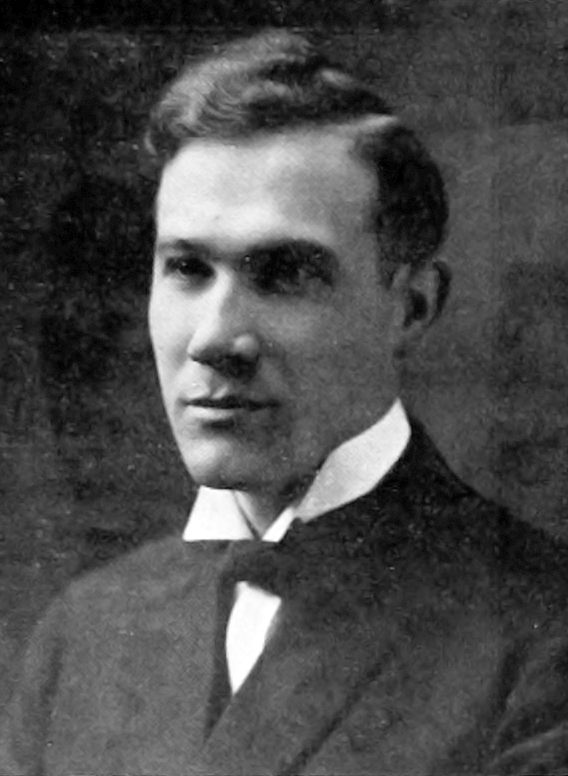
- Eyring in 1914
- Born: Carl Ferdinand Eyring; August 30, 1889; Colonia Juárez, Chihuahua, Mexico
- Died: January 3, 1951 (aged 61); Provo, Utah, United States
- Education: Brigham Young University (A.B.); University of Wisconsin–Madison (M.S.); California Institute of Technology (Ph.D.)
- Spouse: Fern Chipman
- Children: 2, Robert and Elaine
- Relatives: Henry Eyring (nephew); Henry B. Eyring (grandnephew)

Carl Ferdinand Eyring (August 30, 1889 – January 3, 1951) was an American acoustical physicist. He was the dean of the College of Arts and Sciences at Brigham Young University (BYU) for 26 years and was also the vice president of the Acoustical Society of America from 1950 until his death in 1951.

== Biography ==
Eyring was born in Colonia Juárez, Chihuahua, Mexico to Henry Eyring and Deseret Fawcett.

Eyring was also a leader in the Church of Jesus Christ of Latter-day Saints (LDS Church). He served as the first president of the New England Mission from 1937 to 1939. During this time, Eyring exerted efforts to keep Latter-day Saint students at Harvard University, MIT, and other Boston-area institutions of higher learning active in the church.

Eyring was the uncle of the noted chemist Henry Eyring, who was father of Henry B. Eyring, of the LDS Church's First Presidency. Carl Eyring was married to Fern Chipman, a daughter of Stephen L. Chipman. She was the sister of Lorena Chipman, who was the wife of Harvey Fletcher.

From 1924 until 1951, excepting his time as mission president, Eyring served as the dean of the College of Arts and Sciences at BYU. During some of this time he also served as a member of the General Board of the Deseret Sunday School Union.

In 1930, Eyring proposed an equation for reverberation time known as the Eyring equation.

Beginning in 1945, Eyring personally supervised the planning and construction of a new science building at BYU. When the cement was laid for the building, Eyring sprayed it with a special hose to help it cure better. It is said that this cement never cracked. In 1954 the building was renamed the Carl F. Eyring Science Center in his honor.

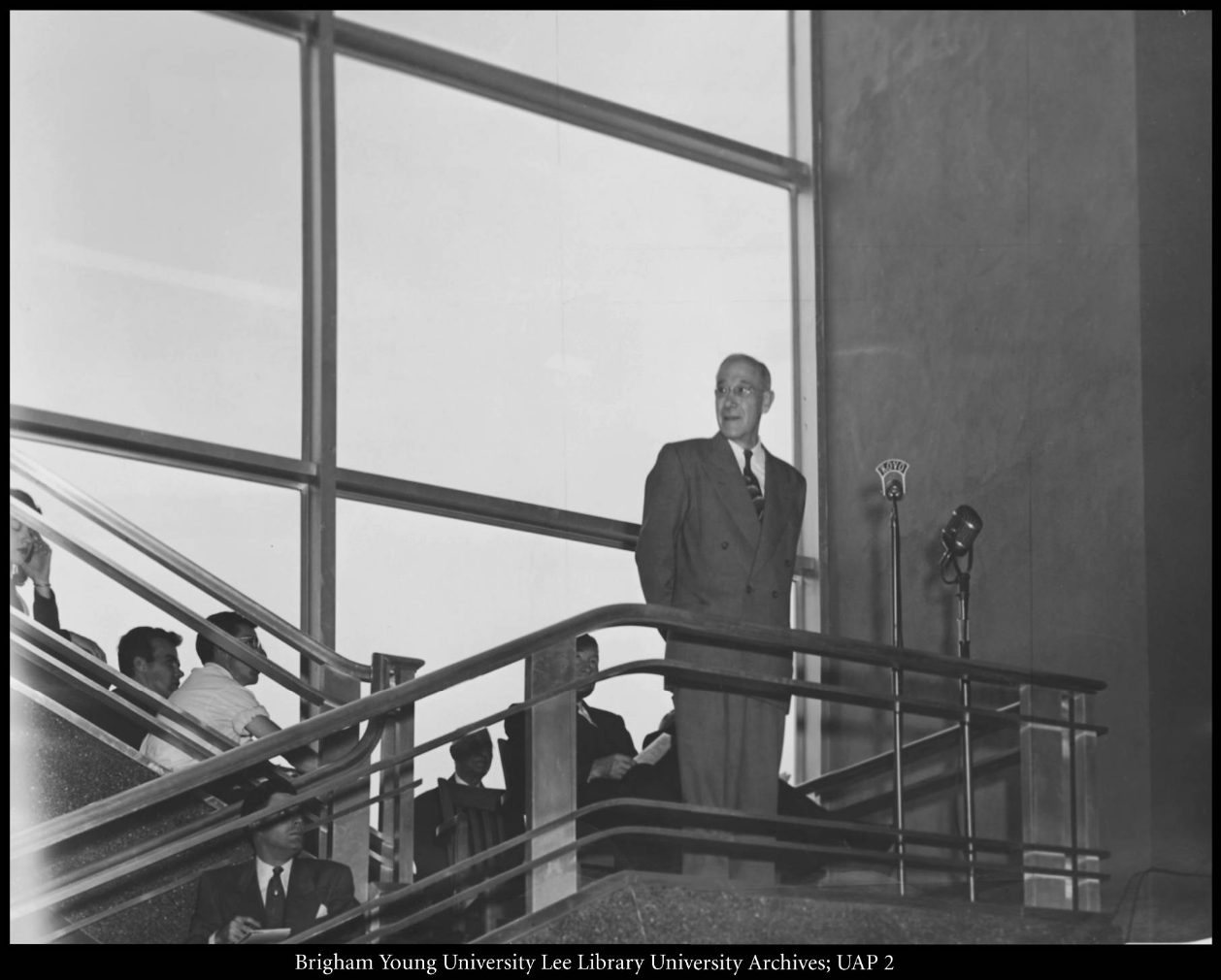
Dr. Eyring giving a speech at the dedication of the new science building at BYU

Eyring died of a cerebral hemorrhage on January 3, 1951.

Loren C. Dunn was among those who studied under Eyring.
