= Henry Eyring (Mormon pioneer) =

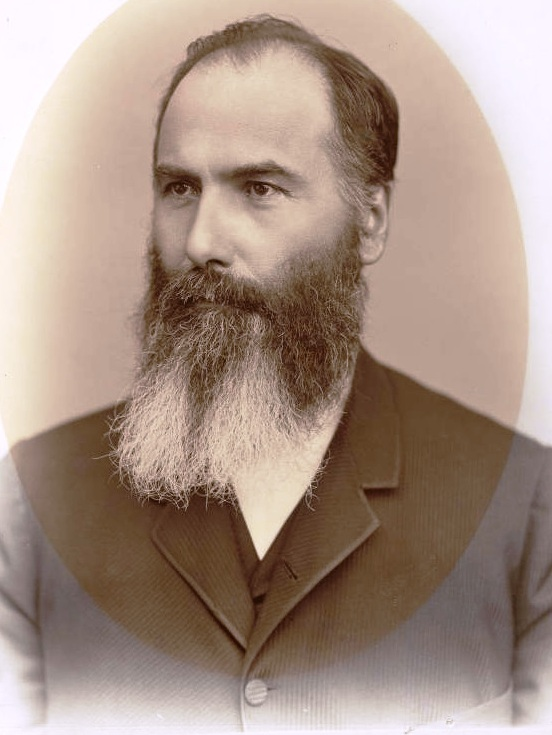

Personal details
- Born: Henry Carlos Ferdinand Eyring; March 9, 1835; Coburg, Saxe-Coburg-Gotha
- Died: February 10, 1902 (aged 66); Colonia Juárez, Mexico
- Resting place: Colonia Juárez Cemetery; 30.3030°N 108.0760°W
- Spouse(s): Including: Mary Bommeli; Deseret Fawcett
- Children: Including: Carl F. Eyring
- Parents: Edward Christian Eyring; Ferdinandina Charlotta Caroline von Blomberg

Henry Carlos Ferdinand Eyring (March 9, 1835 – February 10, 1902) was a prominent mid-level leader of the Church of Jesus Christ of Latter-day Saints (LDS Church) in the United States and Mexico during the 19th and early-20th centuries. He was also mayor of St. George, Utah. Eyring was the grandfather of chemist Henry Eyring and Camilla Eyring Kimball, wife of LDS Church president Spencer W. Kimball.

== Biography ==
=== Early life ===
Eyring was born in Coburg, Saxe-Coburg-Gotha in what is today Germany. He was the son of Edward Christian Eyring and Ferdinandina Charlotta Caroline von Blomberg. His mother was the daughter of nobleman Georg Louis von Blomberg who served in the government of King Frederich Wilhelm III of Prussia. Eyring's father was a pharmacist in a long-standing family business but he suffered economic reverses and by the time Edward Eyring died in about 1850 Henry was left an orphan with little money.

=== Education ===
Eyring received the best education available in Coburg, and about the time his father died became an apprentice drug wholesaler in Vienna. Eyring emigrated to the United States in 1853 and settled in St. Louis, Missouri, in 1854. In December 1854 Eyring went to a meeting of The Church of Jesus Christ of Latter-day Saints where he heard Milo Andrus speak, and due to the message he heard from Andrus, he felt the need to learn more of the church. Eyring was baptized into the LDS Church in March 1855 by William Brown. In October 1855 Eyring was sent to be a missionary in the Cherokee Nation, Indian Territory (current Oklahoma).

=== Missionary ===
Eyring served as a missionary in the Choctaw, Creek and Cherokee nations. Eyring remained in Indian Territory until 1860, serving as president of the mission for part of this time. He then moved to Ogden, Utah Territory.

Two of Eyring's wives included Mary Bommeli, a convert to the LDS Church who was an emigrant from Switzerland, and Deseret Fawcett, a Salt Lake City native born to English parents. He married them in December 1860 and August 1872, respectively. In 1862 Eyring moved to St. George, Utah Territory. He became bishop of the St. George 2nd Ward. From 1874 to 1876 Eyring served a mission in Germany and Switzerland, during which he translated the Doctrine and Covenants into German.

Eyring served for two years as mayor of St. George, as well as being Erastus Snow's chief assistant in the southern region of the Utah militia. From 1877 until 1887 Eyring served as a counselor in the stake presidency of church's St. George Stake. In 1887, due to attempts to arrest Eyring on unlawful cohabitation charges, he moved to the Mormon settlement of Colonia Juárez, Chihuahua, Mexico. He served as president of the LDS Church's Mexican Mission from late 1887 until the end of 1888. He later served from 1891 to 1895 as a counselor to George Teasdale in the presidency of the Mexican Mission. When the first stake in Mexico (the Juarez Stake) was organized, Eyring became the first counselor in the stake presidency.

=== Death ===
He died February 10, 1902, in Colonia Juárez, and is buried in the Colonia Juárez Cemetery.

Among Eyring's children was Carl F. Eyring, a prominent scientist who was on the faculty of Brigham Young University for many years.
