= BYU Family History Library =

Library in Utah, United States

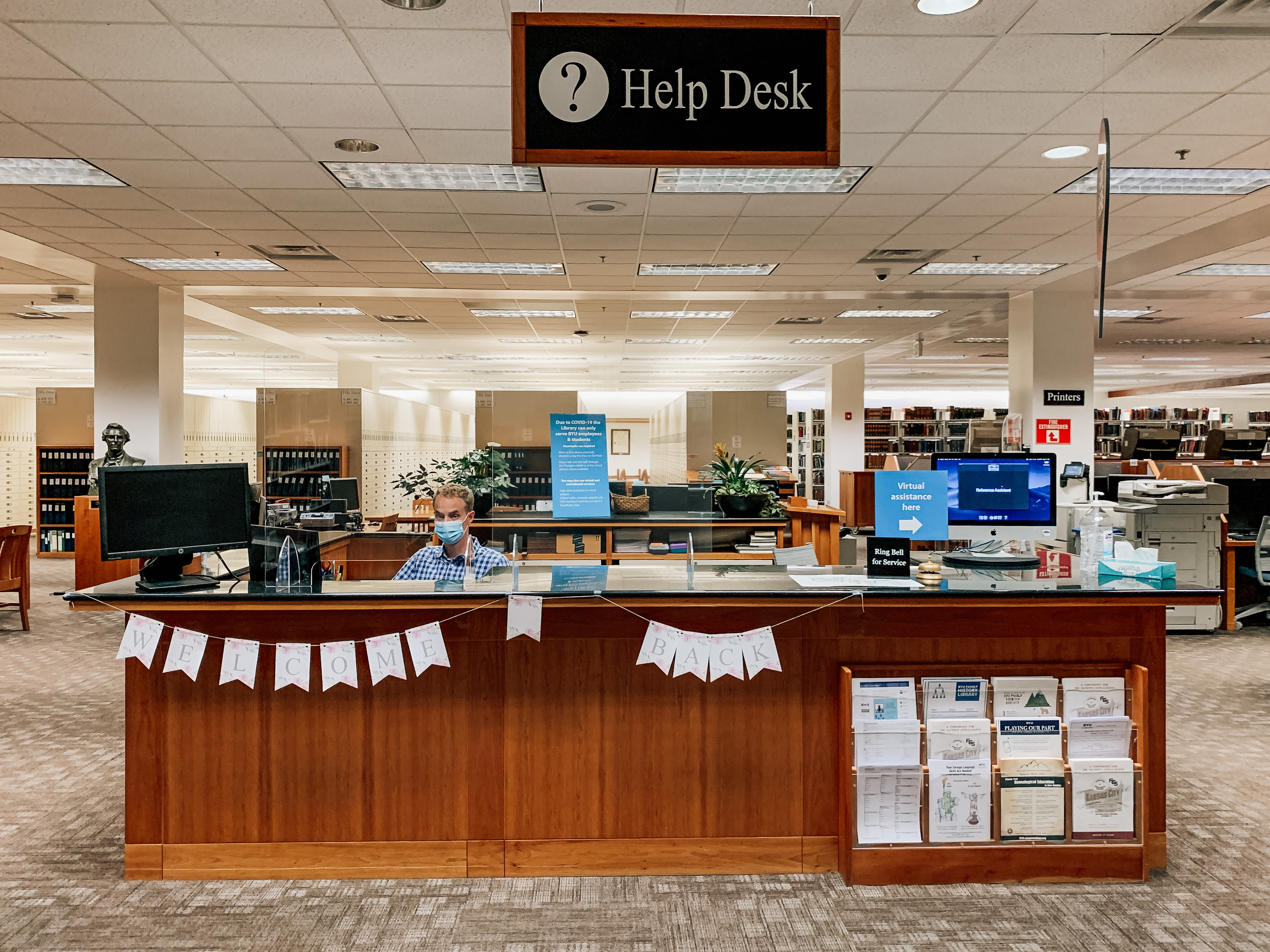
- The help desk at the BYU FHL
- Location: Harold B. Lee Library, Provo, Utah
- Type: Genealogical
- Established: 1964
- Branch of: FamilySearch Library, Salt Lake City, Utah

Access and use
- Population served: Brigham Young University, community patrons

Other information
- Director: Joseph B. Everett
- Website: http://www.lib.byu.edu/fslab/

The BYU Family History Library (FHL) is located in the Harold B. Lee Library (HBLL) on the campus of Brigham Young University in Provo, Utah. It is one of the Family History Centers devoted to assisting library patrons in genealogical research. It began as a small section of the BYU library in 1962, and later expanded into a branch of the FamilySearch Library, the genealogical library of the Church of Jesus Christ of Latter-day Saints, in 1964. It was formerly known as the Utah Valley Regional Family History Center.

The BYU FHL houses a large collection of physical materials, such as microfilms, photographs, books, and other documents. It also offers access to digital materials, including genealogical databases and digitized newspapers. Scanners, computers, and printers are also available. The BYU FHL assists patrons online through its website, YouTube channel, and hosted webinars. It also offers classes in a variety of areas related to genealogy.

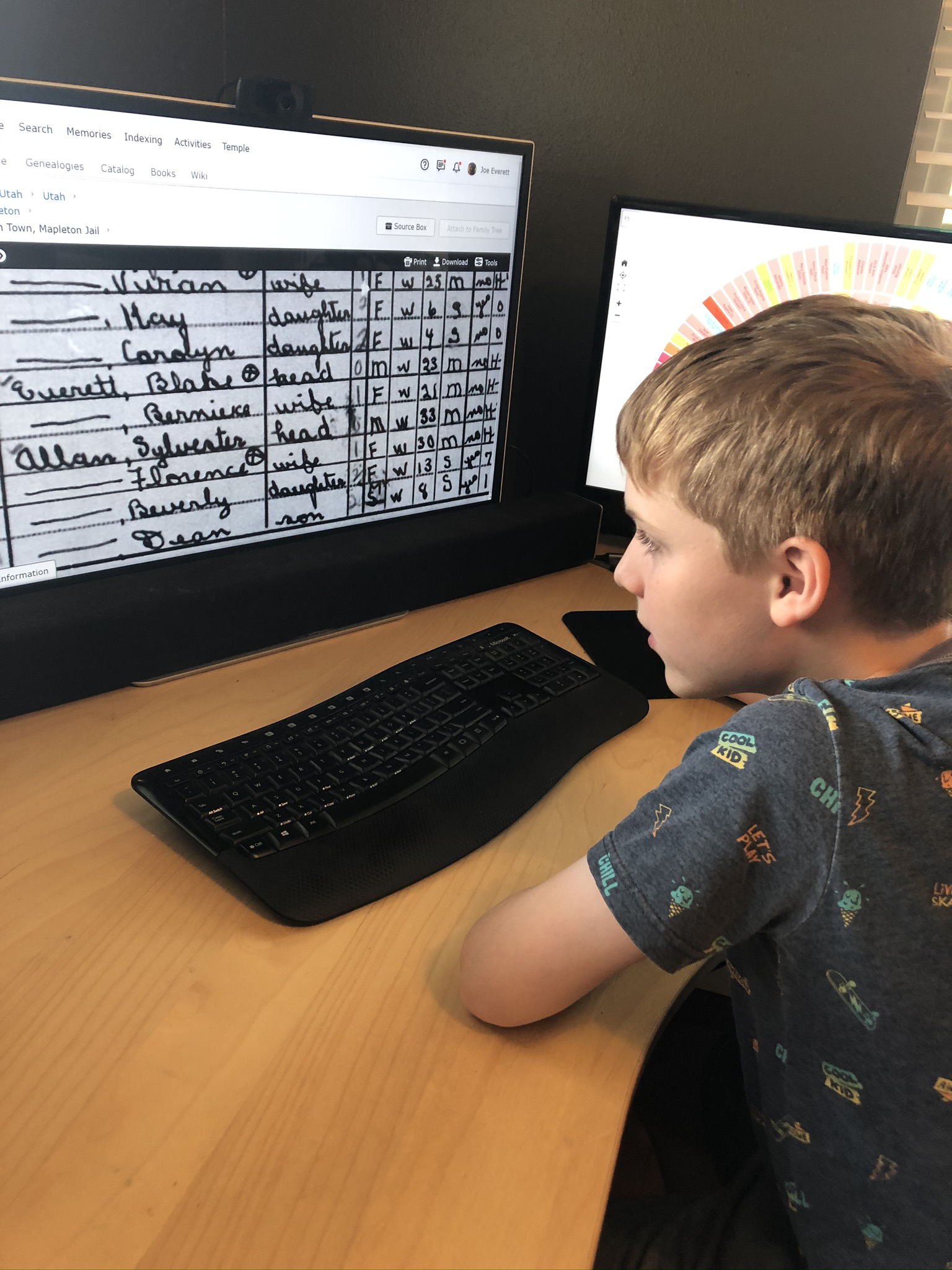
Online materials at the BYU FHL

== History ==
After the establishment of the J. Reuben Clark library in 1961 (later called the Harold B. Lee Library), a few family history research materials were incorporated the following year. A branch of the genealogical library of the LDS Church was then established in the library in 1964. It contained the library of the Utah county Genealogical Historical Society and a catalog of the materials in the main genealogical library in Salt Lake City. The genealogical library branch was located on the 4th floor, with specialized reference personnel. With the help of other library workers, Eve Nielsen recataloged the Genealogical Society of Utah's Utah county records over three years. In 1973, construction on an expansion of the BYU library began, and the Utah Valley Branch Genealogical Library expanded along with it.

In the 1990s, the BYU Family History Library (then called the Utah Valley Regional Family History Center) offered to the public classes conducted by research consultants on various computer research tools. These included courses on DOS, IBM Personal Ancestral File, and Macintosh Personal Ancestral File. In 2000, the BYU FHL moved into the new addition of the Harold B. Lee Library. Before FamilySearch developed its own FamilySearch Indexing project, much of the scanning of genealogical materials for the FamilySearch website took place at the FHL. As of 2008, around 50 different classes were offered by the FHL, including instruction on conducting international research.

== Present day ==
Today, the BYU Family History Library is located on level 2 of the Harold B. Lee Library. It is staffed with librarians, student employees, and family history missionaries. These volunteer missionaries help visitors to the BYU FHL conduct research using the FHL's online and print resources. They also assist members of the LDS Church in preparing the names of ancestors for vicarious ordinances. Faculty, students, and community patrons can access genealogical databases (such as FamilySearch, Ancestry.com, Fold3, and FindMyPast), digital scanners, and computers with genealogical software. The BYU FHL's array of scanners digitize materials such as microfilm, photographs, negatives, loose documents, and bound books. Patrons can also print large fan charts at the library. The FHL houses almost 500,000 microfilms, obtained from the Family History Library in Salt Lake City. Digitized historical newspapers from the US and UK are also available.

The BYU Family History Library website links to resources for patrons' research and offers virtual assistance. In order to reach people remotely, the FHL offers webinars on a variety of topics related to genealogy. Upcoming webinars are announced on the BYU FHL's website. The FHL also operates a YouTube channel with genealogy tutorials. With the COVID-19 pandemic, the library began operating a virtual reference desk. The FHL currently offers virtual classes on Sundays in addition to its webinars.

== See also ==
- BYU Research Institutes - BYU Center for Family History and Genealogy
- Immigrant Ancestors Project
- Genealogy
