= Theodore M. Burton =

American genealogist & LDS Church leader (1907–1989)

Emeritus General Authority
- September 30, 1989 – December 22, 1989
- Called by: Ezra Taft Benson

First Quorum of the Seventy
- October 1, 1976 – September 30, 1989
- Called by: Spencer W. Kimball
- End reason: Granted general authority emeritus status

Assistant to the Quorum of the Twelve Apostles
- October 8, 1960 – October 1, 1976
- Called by: David O. McKay
- End reason: Position abolished

Personal details
- Born: Theodore Moyle Burton; March 27, 1907; Salt Lake City, Utah, United States
- Died: December 22, 1989 (aged 82); Salt Lake City, Utah, United States
- Alma mater: University of Utah
- Spouse(s): Minnie Susan Preece

Theodore Moyle Burton (March 27, 1907 – December 22, 1989) was a general authority of the Church of Jesus Christ of Latter-day Saints (LDS Church) and one of the main leaders of the church's Genealogical Department in the 1960s. Under his direction the department expanded its operations, largely through the opening of many more Family History Centers.

Burton was born in Salt Lake City, Utah. From 1927 to 1930, he served as an LDS Church missionary in the Swiss-German Mission. As a youth, Burton became the first Eagle Scout in the Pioneer Stake of the LDS Church.

In 1933, he married Minnie Susan Preece. In 1934, Burton received a bachelor's degree and a master's degree from the University of Utah, where he became a Sigma Chi. He worked for the treasury attache at the U.S. embassies in both Vienna and Berlin. He later taught at Carbon College and Utah State Agricultural College. He returned to Purdue University where he earned a Ph.D. in chemistry in 1951. He returned to Utah State, but in 1957 was called as president of the church's West German Mission.

In 1960, Burton was called as an Assistant to the Quorum of the Twelve Apostles. He served in this position until it was disbanded in 1976; he and the other Assistants were subsumed by the First Quorum of the Seventy. During the 1950s, Burton had served as bishop of the Logan 4th Ward prior to becoming a mission president.

Burton served as president of the European Mission of the church and later as the Area Supervisor in Europe.

As director of the Genealogical Department, Burton initiated the translation of materials into languages other than English. He held the title of executive director of the Genealogical Department from 1972 to 1978. He also negotiated the contracting out of microfilming work to a private company in 1967 and then its later resumption as a function of the church department.
