= International Genealogical Index =

The International Genealogical Index (IGI) is a database of genealogical records, compiled from several sources, and maintained by the Church of Jesus Christ of Latter-day Saints. Originally created in 1969, the index was intended to help track the performance of temple ordinances for the dead.

The IGI contains free genealogical information, submitted from various sources including names and data for vicarious ordinances by Latter-day Saints (LDS) researchers, records obtained from contributors who are not members of the church, and data extracted from microfilmed birth or marriage records. The index contains millions of records of individuals who lived between 1500 and 1900, primarily in the United States, Canada, Latin America, and Europe. Ongoing efforts are made to compile genealogical data from other regions and peoples.

The IGI contains many duplicate names, accumulated over time from many sources, and no real effort is made to validate the information. Many IGI records contain information on the submitter and date of submission (but only with the submitter's consent). The IGI is available at FamilySearch, which is operated by the LDS Church.

In 1995, after a controversy, a deal was struck between the Jewish community and the LDS church, with the church agreeing to "issue a directive to all officials and members of the Church to discontinue any future baptisms of deceased Jews" and "remove from the International Genealogical Index in the future the names of all deceased Jews who are so identified if they are known to be improperly included counter to Church policy."

== See also ==
- Family History Library
- Genealogy and baptism
