= Franz M. Johansen =

American sculptor

Franz Johansen
- Born: 1928; Huntsville, Utah, U.S.
- Died: August 23, 2018 (aged 89–90); Provo, Utah, U.S.
- Education: Brigham Young University
- Movement: LDS contemporary art
- Spouse(s): Ruth Aldous (d. 2001); Josie Morris
- Children: 7

Franz Mark Johansen (1928, Huntsville, Utah—August 23, 2018, Provo, Utah) was a Latter-day Saint (LDS) sculptor and an emeritus professor at Brigham Young University (BYU). He has been called the founder of the LDS contemporary art movement that expresses spiritual belief through the human form.

== Biography ==
Johansen studied at BYU under B. F. Larsen and J. Roman Andrus. He then pursued advanced studies at the Illinois Institute of Technology, California School of Arts and Crafts, the Academie de la Grande Chaumiere and the University of Miami.

Johansen joined the BYU faculty in 1956. He remained a member of the faculty until his retirement in 1987. Johansen was the chairman of the BYU Art Department starting in 1981.

Among works by Johansen are large relief sculptures on the exteriors of the LDS Museum of Church History and Art (now the Church History Museum) on West Temple in Salt Lake City, and the Harold B. Lee Library and Joseph Smith Buildings at BYU. He also sculpted medallions on the front doors of the Washington D.C. Temple. Other noted works by Johansen include The Rod and the Veil, 1975, housed in the LDS Church History Museum; Resurrection: Restored 2 Nephi 2:12; and a bust of Gerrit de Jong. Johansen's The Grave Hath No Victory is located in the BYU sculpture garden between the BYU Museum of Art and the Harris Fine Arts Center. Johansen also did the sculpture of a family in the Winter Quarters cemetery. Johansen has also had an oil on canvas painting presented in shows.

Johansen received first place at the 20th Annual Spiritual and Religious Art of Utah show at the Springville Art Museum for his work Veiled Study.

Johansen was a member of The Church of Jesus Christ of Latter-day Saints. He and his wife Ruth Dolores Aldous (1928-2001) had seven children: Lynn, Kevin, David, Nathan, Shawn, Mat, and Lisa. After Ruth's death, he married Josie Morris. His son Nathan is also an artist and the two collaborated on a sculpture for Utah State University.
