= Granite Mountain (Salt Lake County, Utah) =

Underground document storage facility in Utah, United States

Coordinates: 40.573143°N 111.763413°W

The entrances to the Granite Mountain vaults

Granite Mountain is a mass of solid rock one mile up Little Cottonwood Canyon in the Wasatch Range of Utah, not too far from Salt Lake City, Utah. Despite its name, Granite Mountain is primarily composed of quartz monzonite, an igneous rock similar to granite in appearance, physical characteristics, and chemical composition. This is the same material used to construct the Salt Lake Temple and the facade of the LDS Conference Center.

== Granite Mountain Records Vault ==
The Granite Mountain Records Vault (also known simply as The Vault) is a large archive and vault owned by the Church of Jesus Christ of Latter-day Saints (LDS Church) excavated 600 feet into the north side of Little Cottonwood Canyon. The Granite Mountain facilities feature a dry, environment-controlled facility used for long-term record storage, as well as administrative offices, shipping and receiving docks, a processing facility and restoration laboratory for microfilm.

Records stored include genealogical and family history information contained in over 2.4 million rolls of microfilm and 1 million microfiche. This equals about three billion pages of family history records. The vault's library of microfilm increases by up to 40,000 rolls per year. Since 1999, the church has been digitizing the genealogical microfilms stored in the vault. The church makes the records publicly available through its Family History Centers, as well as online at its FamilySearch website.

There is a second vault, two miles farther up the canyon. However, this vault is owned and operated by Perpetual Storage Inc., and run for-profit.

== See also ==
- Family History Library
- FamilySearch Indexing
- Genealogical Society of Utah
