= List of Mormon family organizations =

Mormon family organizations (i.e., family organizations or associations) are entities created by members of the Church of Jesus Christ of Latter-day Saints (LDS Church) to accomplish the basic purposes of family life as understood within the church, in order to establish and strengthen family unity and identity across multiple generations.

== Importance ==
As the basic unit of society, the family is also the fundamental organization within the LDS Church. LDS Church members tend to be very family-oriented, and have strong connections across generations and with extended family, often through regular family reunions. For LDS Church members a knowledge and appreciation of one's lineage and heritage is closely connected to the sacred ordinances conducted in LDS temples.

In its most general sense, the term "family organization" as used within the church refers to the fundamental concept of eternal family structure encompassed by the Plan of Salvation. More specifically, "family organization" refers to organizations created to provide structure and direction in meeting immediate and long-term family objectives and purposes. In connection therewith, LDS Church leaders have regularly taught the importance of establishing and supporting family organizations.

During the 20th century as part of the church's semi-annual General Conferences, a "Priesthood Genealogy Seminar" was conducted by LDS Church leaders in which the importance of family organizations was frequently emphasized. "[E]stablishing and maintaining family organizations for the immediate and extended family" has been expressly listed as an appropriate way to observe the importance of the Sabbath day in General Conference addresses and other church publications.

== Purpose and organization ==
In 1978 the church asked all families to organize themselves at three levels: as "immediate" families, "grandparent," and "ancestral." Individual or immediate families are regularly encouraged to hold weekly Family Home Evening and participate in family councils. More formal family organizations consist of the descendants of a common ancestor. The purposes of such family organizations may include coordinating family efforts in promoting welfare, education, conducting family history research, holding reunions, compiling family newsletters and publications, and other family-related LDS practices. Commemorating family heritage and legacy is another typical purpose and activity for family organizations. In September 2016, LDS Ancestral Families Association (LDSAFA) was established as a "free registration, publication and support consortium for LDS Ancestral Family Organizations (AFOs)."

== Influence ==
Formally constituted family organizations figure prominently among descendants of some Mormon pioneers and other early converts to the LDS Church. The longevity of and degree of organization found among many Mormon ancestral family organizations is noteworthy. For example, the Jared Pratt Family Organization was founded in 1881, making it one of the oldest family organizations in the United States in continuous existence.

In 1971 the Internal Revenue Service of the United States issued a Revenue Ruling determining that non-profit family organizations that are expressly "formed to compile genealogical research data on its family members in order to perform religious ordinances in accordance with the precepts of the religious denomination to which family members belong" are exempt under Section 501(c)(3).

Given their extensive documentation of lineages connecting many thousands of living individuals to a single common ancestor, their relatively larger extended family size (attributable in part to the early Mormon practice of plural marriage), relatively larger immediate family size, religious emphasis on "clean" or healthy living, and relative longevity, the genealogical data maintained by many Mormon ancestral family organizations have also been instrumental in medical research of genetic disorders. The University of Utah has made unique contributions to the study of genetics due in part to long-term genealogy efforts of the LDS Church, which has allowed researchers to trace genetic disorders through several generations. The relative homogeneity of Utah's population also makes it an ideal laboratory for studies of population genetics. The university is home to the Genetic Science Learning Center, a resource which educates the public about genetics through its website.

There are several large Mormon ancestral family organizations, notable for their longevity, quality or degree of organization, or connection to well-known deceased or currently living persons. A non-exhaustive list appears below.

== LDS Ancestral Family Organizations (alphabetized by male progenitor surname) ==
A

- Allred (Rocky Mtn.) Family Organization
- Milo Andrus Family Organization

B

- Israel Barlow Family Association
- Belnap Family Organization
- The Bennion Family Organization of Utah
- Bluth Family Association
- Braithwaite Family Organization
- Brough Family Organization
- Orson Pratt Brown Family

C

- Anson Bowen Call Family
- George Q. Cannon Family Association
- Cazier Family Organization
- Ezra Thompson Clark Family Organization
- Samuel Clark Family Organization
- Phineas Wolcott Cook Family Organization

D

- Dastrup Family Organization

E

- Major Howard Egan Family Foundation
- Bishop David Evans Family Association

F

- Winslow Farr, Sr. Organization
- Peter Fullmer Family Organization

G

- Gardner and Brooks Family Organization
- Henry Grow Family Association

H

- Hale Family Organization
- Ephraim Hanks Family
- Nathan Harris and Rhoda Lapham Family
- Hatch Family Association
- John and Jane Hayes Family Organization
- Martin Heiner Family Organization
- Henry Hendricks Family Organization
- Abraham Heslington Family Organization

J

- Jackson and Flint Family Foundation
- Benjamin F. Johnson Family Organization
- George Jarvis and Ann Prior Family Association
- Joel Hills Johnson Family Organization

K

- Heber C. Kimball Family Association
- Joseph Knight Sr. and Polly Knight Family Organization

L

- Leo C. and Relia Shaw Larsen Family Organization
- Western Association of Leavitt Families
- John Doyle Lee Family Association

M

- John Marriott Historical Society
- Hugh McKenna Family Organization
- John Morse Family Organization
- Joseph Stacy Murdock Family Organization

N

- Alexander Neibaur Family Organization
- Nichols and Booth Family Organization

O

- Osmond Family Organization

P

- John Pack Family Association
- Francis Martin Pomeroy Family Organization
- Sanford Porter Family Organization
- Jared Pratt Family Association

R

- John Hardison Redd and Elizabeth Hancock Family Organization
- Charles C. Rich Family Association

S

- Justus Azel Seelye Family Organization
- Hyrum Smith Family Association
- Jesse N. Smith Heritage Foundation
- Joseph Smith, Sr. and Lucy Mack Smith Family Association
- Joseph Smith, Jr. and Emma Hale Historical Society
- Joseph F. Smith Family Association
- Abraham Owen Smoot Family Organization
- Sorensen Family History Organization
- John Martin Steiner and Anna Barbara Schmied Family Organization
- Joseph Stout Family Organization
- Jacob Strong Family Organization

T

- George Washington Taggart Family Organization
- Joseph Taylor, Sr. Family Association
- Tolman Family Organization
- Theodore Turley Family Organization

W

- Workman Family Organization

== See also ==
- Culture of The Church of Jesus Christ of Latter-day Saints
- Daughters of the Utah Handcart Pioneers
- Daughters of Utah Pioneers
- Family
- FamilySearch
- Family association
- Family history
- Family History Library
- Family history society
- Family reunion
- The Family: A Proclamation to the World
- Genealogy
- List of hereditary and lineage organizations
- Mormon pioneers
- Sons of Utah Pioneers

== Sources ==
- Allen, James B.; Embry, Jessie L.; Mehr, Kahlile B. (1995), "Hearts Turned to the Fathers: A History of the Genealogical Society of Utah, 1894-1994", BYU Studies, 34 (2), Provo, Utah: Brigham Young University
- Bennett, Archibald F. (1960) [1951], A Guide for Genealogical Research (2nd ed.), Salt Lake City: Genealogical Society of the Church of Jesus Christ of Latter-Day Saints, OCLC 20467434
- Widtsoe, John A. (1939), Priesthood and Church Government in the Church of Jesus Christ of Latter-day Saints, Salt Lake City, Utah: Deseret Book, OCLC 20467434
