= FamilySearch Center =

Genealogical centers operated by The Church of Jesus Christ of Latter-day Saints

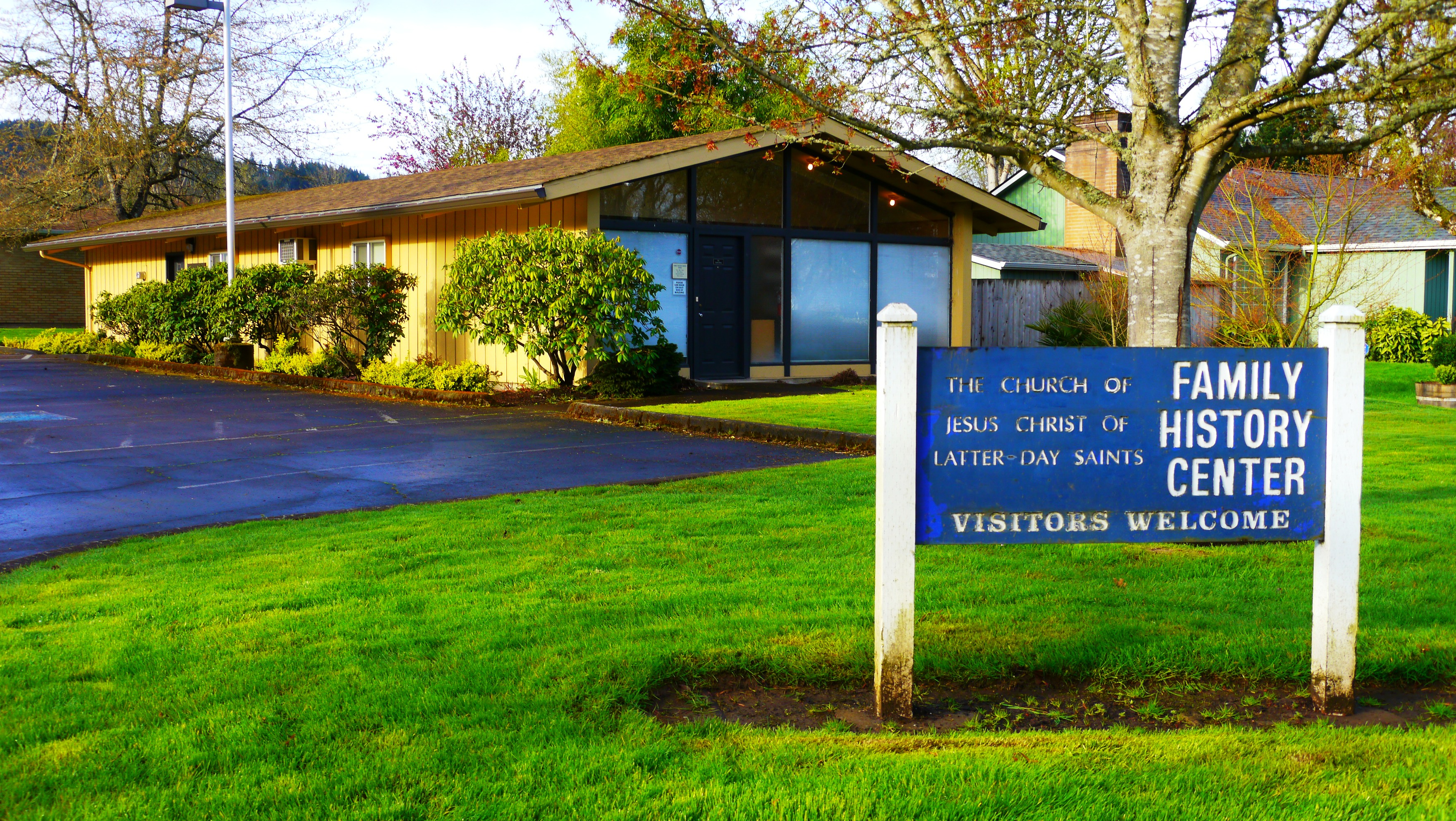
A FamilySearch Center in Eugene, Oregon.

A FamilySearch Center in Jacarepaguá, Rio de Janeiro, Brazil.

FamilySearch Centers (FSC), formerly Family History Centers (FHC), are branches of the FamilySearch Library (FSL) in Salt Lake City, Utah, operated by the Church of Jesus Christ of Latter-day Saints (LDS Church). The centers supply resources for research and study of genealogy and family history. As of 2026, there are more than 6,622 FSC in 149 countries.

== History ==
The Salt Lake City Genealogical Library was founded in 1894 to gather genealogical records and assist members of the LDS Church with their family history and genealogical research. It is the largest library of its kind in the world. It is open to the general public at no charge. The FSL is visited by an estimated 1,900 or more individual patrons each day. By 1975, there were 17 "branch libraries" around the world.

The library collection has 2.4 million rolls of FSL microfilmed genealogical records and more than 742,000 microfiches in the main system. In 2003, the collection increased monthly by an average of 4,100 rolls of film, 700 books, and 16 electronic resources. A majority of the records contain information about persons who lived before 1930. Approximately 200 cameras are currently microfilming records in more than 45 countries. Records have been filmed in more than 110 countries, territories, and possessions.

The first FSC, then called a branch genealogical library, was organized in the Harold B. Lee Library (HBLL) at Brigham Young University (BYU) in May 1964. Plans to organize FSCs in Mesa, Arizona, Logan, Utah, Cardston, Alberta, and Oakland, California, each adjacent to a temples in one of those cities, had been announced at the church's October 1963 general conference.

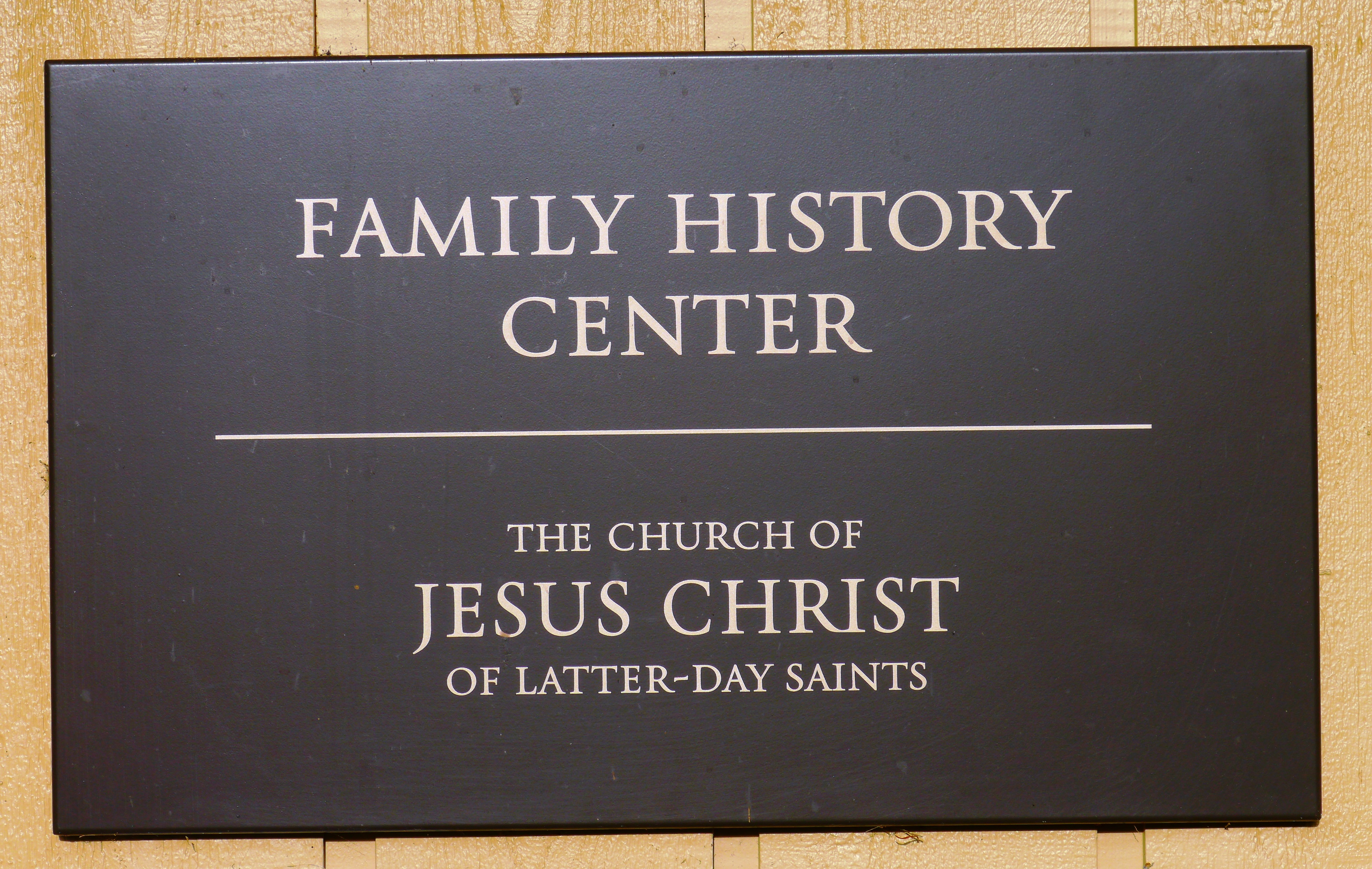
A Family History Center sign

The FSCs were put under the overall direction of Archibald F. Bennett. By December 1964, there were 29 FSCs, and by 1968, there were 75. In 1987, these institutions were renamed "Family History Centers." On January 10, 2023, the LDS Church announced that Family History Centers would be known as FamilySearch Centers.

== Ward, stake and multi-stake FSCs ==
FSCs vary greatly in size, hours staffed, and resources available. Because of changing demographics, many smaller FSCs are closing with their resources being directed into "Library Class" facilities similar to the Los Angeles FHL, but not like the Riverton FSC that has computers only.

=== BYU Family History Library ===
The BYU Family History Library is part of the HBLL at BYU in Provo, Utah. The BYU FHL was one of the original planned FSCs and is the largest FHC outside of Salt Lake City. It was formerly known as the Utah Valley Regional Family History Center. It is now semi-independent of the LDS Church's FSC system.

=== FamilySearch Library ===
In June 2010, the LDS Church closed down many smaller FSCs in the Salt Lake Valley and opened the Riverton FSL, a misnomer, since the facility has no books and no magazines, having computers only. Whether this will be a trend for future FSCs is not known. The Riverton FSL in Riverton, Utah has a Family Story Room available for use to record ancestor and family stories with state-of-the-art audio and video technology.

== Familysearch.org databases ==
The Ancestral File database contains more than 36 million names that are linked into families. The International Genealogical Index database contains approximately 600 million names of deceased individuals. An addendum to the International Genealogical Index contains an additional 125 million names. These names have been patron-submitted or extracted from thousands of original birth, christening, and marriage records. The Pedigree Resource File database contains more than 80 million names that are linked into families. Records from the United States, Canada, the British Isles, Europe, Latin America, Asia, and Africa, are available. The Social Security Death Index represents millions who were in the US Social Security system before death. A majority of the records contain information about persons who lived before 1930.

Census records from the 1880 United States Federal Census and from the 1881 British & Canadian censuses are available. A Vital Records Index presents thousands of names for Mexico and Scandinavia only. Approximately 200 cameras are currently microfilming records in more than 45 countries. Records have been filmed in more than 110 countries, territories, and possessions.

In 2003, the collection increased monthly by an average of 4,100 rolls of film, 700 books, and 16 electronic resources.

== Digitization and indexing projects ==
In the late 1990s, a "pilot program" to update familysearch.org and digitize its entire collection was started using volunteers to transcribe historical records. This process is known as indexing. This new genealogical index is considered an upgrade. It is a work in progress representing 426 regions around the world. Millions of new names have been input by volunteers and volunteers for the project are being actively solicited at FamilySearchIndexing.org. The searchable database containing the digital images and index will be available through the LDS Church's FamilySearch website.

== See also ==
- Family History Research Wiki
- Genealogical Society of Utah
