= Family association =

A family association, family society, or family organization may be an organization formed by people who share a common ancestor or surname, or a grouping or organization which helps families and supports family life.

== Family organizations ==
Families join together for a variety of purposes, including exchanging genealogical information, sharing current news about family members, having reunions, and promoting family pride and unity among living descendants. Family organizations centered on a more distant common ancestor are often referred to as "ancestral family organizations", while those centered on a commonly shared surname are commonly referred to as "single-surname family organizations".

Some family associations strive to collect information about people with their surname all over the world, while others consist of a relatively small family group in a specific geographic area. Some groups put a lot of effort into family research while others prefer to concentrate more on family reunions and current family news.

Family associations and organizations often figure prominently among the Overseas Chinese. Family association buildings are often prominent features of Chinatowns. They also figure prominently among descendants of Mormon pioneers and other early converts to the Church of Jesus Christ of Latter-day Saints.

In some countries which have abolished a former monarchy, the former ruling house and other noble families may form family associations to maintain their heritage, such as the Romanov Family Association (of Russia) or the Jeonju Lee Royal Family Association (of Korea).

== Family life organizations ==
Organizations which have existed to support family rights include the Union Internationale des Organismes Familiaux (International Union of Family Organizations). Pope Pius XII addressed this body on the defense of family rights in 1949. The Catholic Church has commended the role of family groups which help families fulfil their roles in maintaining married life and parenting.

== See also ==
- Chinese clan associations
- Guild of One-Name Studies
- List of hereditary and lineage organizations
- List of Mormon family organizations
