= Immigrant Ancestors Project =

The Immigrant Ancestors Project, sponsored by the Center for Family History and Genealogy at Brigham Young University, uses emigration registers and other documents to locate information about the birthplaces of immigrants to the United States and other countries. Such information may not be found in the port registers or naturalization documents in the destination countries. Volunteers working with scholars and researchers at Brigham Young University have created a database of millions of immigrants based on these emigration registers. The Immigrant Ancestors Project focuses on emigrants from England, Ireland, Spain, Germany, France, and Italy.

== Process ==
Each spring and summer, family history majors from Brigham Young University travel as interns to Europe to research at local and national libraries and archives. Directed and supervised by professors and IAP section advisors, the interns identify and gather digital images of emigration records that are not easily accessible to researchers, but that are vital to determining an ancestor's birth and origins. These images are then uploaded onto the IAP software. Volunteers from around the world can then download a batch to their PCs and extract the information from the documents.

== See also ==
- BYU Family History Library
- FamilySearch
- Family History Library
- The Church of Jesus Christ of Latter-day Saints
