= BYU Testing Center =

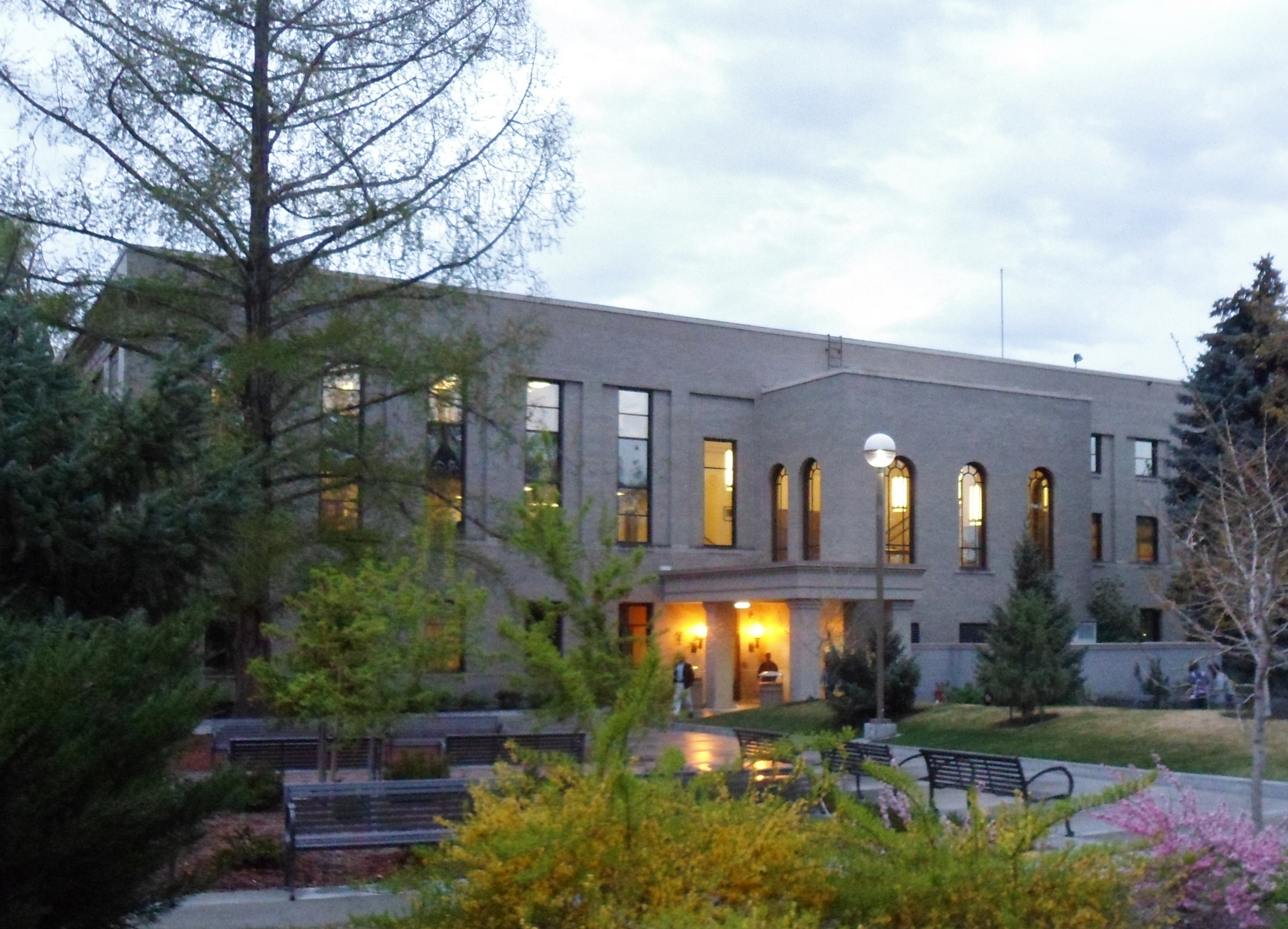
BYU Testing Center

The BYU Testing Center is a student assessment center located in the Heber J. Grant Building at Brigham Young University.

== Building history ==
The Heber J. Grant Building was originally built as the BYU library. It was dedicated in 1925 by Heber J. Grant, the first building completed while Franklin S. Harris was president of BYU. The library was housed on the second floor, while the first floor contained classrooms.

After the building of the Harold B. Lee Library the building was used as a museum by the College of Biology and Agriculture until this was moved to the Monte L. Bean Life Science Museum. In 1982 the building began its use as the university's testing center.

== Current functions ==
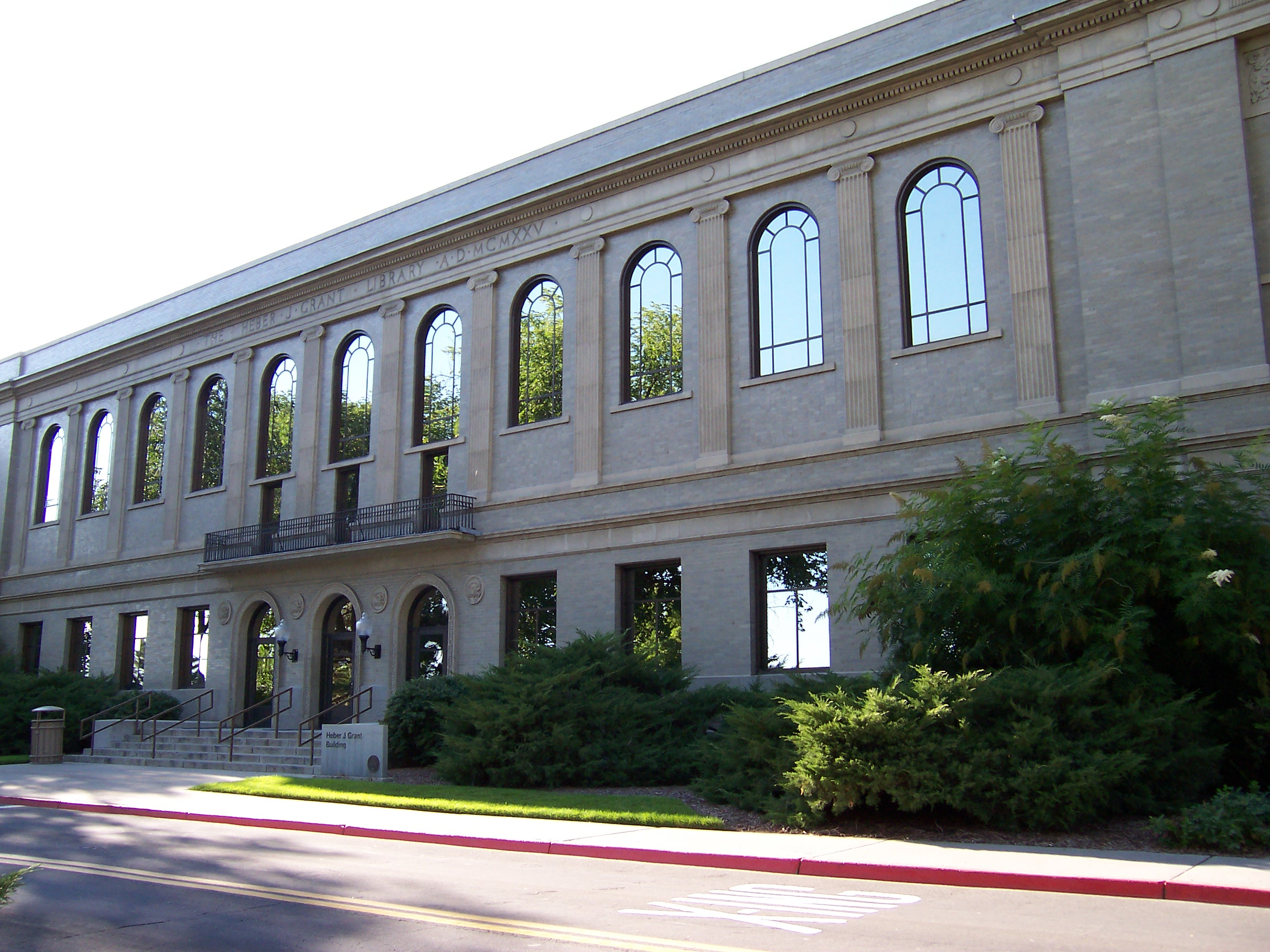
The southern face of the building

The main portion of the Testing Center is a large main testing room, which originally served as BYU's library, and now is filled with approximately 500 desks. Students enter through the center's administration area. The center also has a few smaller rooms with even more desks that are used as overflows when the main testing rooms reach capacity. One of which, the upstairs overflow, sometimes has soft classical music playing through wall-mounted speakers.

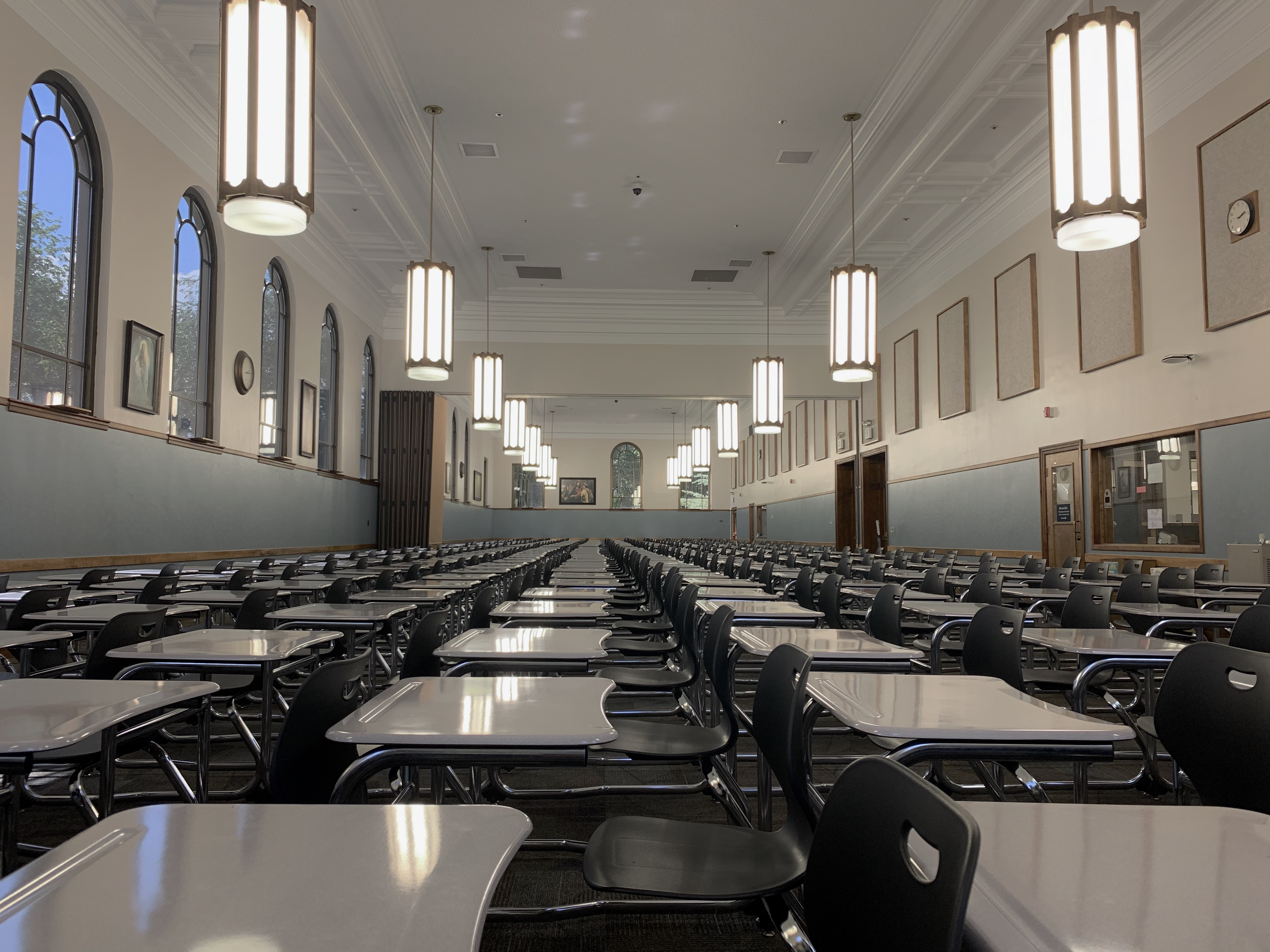
Interior of the BYU Testing Center

When students exit the testing center, they can see their scores immediately on the BYU Testing Center website if their professor allows students access (for multiple-choice tests only). Earlier, those taking multiple-choice tests waited for a moment or two in the administration area to receive a printout of their results, which usually resulted in the exit area being crowded.

In order to accommodate an increased volume of test takers during finals, the Testing Center opens a remote location at the Richards Building. On normal days, lines are usually shortest before 11:00 AM and after 7:00 PM.

== Procedures ==
When students enter the Heber J. Grant Building, they must go to the second floor to receive their tests. An employee will ask the student for their student ID card, scan it, and ask which test the student is there to take. If the student does not have their ID card with them, they may also use their student ID number or NetID. Every student must provide photo identification to verify their identity before being checked out a test. The employee will then scan the student's test, inform them which, if any, items are permitted for use during the test (such as calculators, dictionaries, etc.), indicate whether or not they are allowed to write on their test booklet, inspect and stamp any scratch paper, and instruct them to turn off their cell phone, smart watch, and any other smart devices that the student may have brought with them. If a student has not brought a bag with them for their personal belongings, they will be instructed to use one of the blue bags hanging on the wall in the test check-out area to stow their belongs under their desk during their test. Students will then collect a bubble sheet or cover sheet from the printer and proceed into the main testing room to take their test.

While inside of the testing room, students are forbidden from using phones or any smart devices, as well as any items not listed in the "items allowed" box on their bubble or cover sheet. Students may leave to go to the bathroom as long as they bring their phone and test to the test check-out area. Students may also take supervised snack breaks in the test check-in area. Sharpening pencils at the pencil sharpeners in the test check-out area is permitted at any time while taking a test, as is bringing more sheets of scratch paper to be inspected and stamped. Proctors and security cameras are used to keep a close eye on students to prevent attempts to cheat or gain an unfair advantage over other test takers. Students who are caught cheating will be dismissed from the Testing Center and referred to their professors for further disciplinary action.

When a student finishes taking their test, they simply bring their test materials to the test check-in area and hand them to the staff members behind the counter to be scored and filed. Students must return any borrowed items, such as calculators and dictionaries, before leaving the Testing Center. Students are to recycle all note sheets and stamped scratch paper sheets before exiting the premises.

== Items for sale/rent ==
Students may purchase pencils for $0.35 and Blue Books for $0.75. Additionally, students will be assessed a $5.00 "late fee" if taking their test past a deadline arranged by their professor. Scientific calculators and foreign language dictionaries may be borrowed for no cost (if allowed by the professor for a given exam).
