= BYU Research Institutes =

Research institutes connected with BYU in the present or past include:

- BYU Center for Family History and Genealogy: The Center for Family History and Genealogy is a research center dedicated to pioneering innovative family history research and tools through faculty-student mentoring. The center employs approximately 40 students who work on various research assignments. The largest projects are the Immigrant Ancestors Project and the Nauvoo Community Project. The center is currently directed by Jill N. Crandell, who is a professor in the history department which is part of the College of Family, Home and Social Sciences. Besides the history department, other BYU departments that work with the Center for Family History include the College of Religious Education and the Department of Computer Sciences. The center was organized in 2000 with Raymond S. Wright III as the first director. He was followed by George Ryskamp (2003-2007), Kathryn M. Daynes (2007-2010), and Jill N. Crandell (2011-current). (See also: BYU Family History Library)
- Cancer Research Center: The BYU Cancer Research Center is an organization drawing on faculty and students from multiple colleges that seeks to find treatments and cures for various forms of cancer.
- The Charles Redd Center for Western Studies: focuses on an inter-disciplinary study of the Intermountain Western United States. It pursues this goal by funding research, publishing, and public programming through annual funding cycles of awards, grants, and fellowships, hosting seminars and public lectures by scholars, and gathering and publishing scholarly materials. With traditional strengths in the social sciences and humanities, the center also promotes regional studies from various other disciplines. The current director is Jay H. Buckley, an associate professor of history and noted scholar of western exploration and the fur trade. Brenden W. Rensink is the associate director and an associate professor of history with specialties in borderlands, Native American, and environmental histories. Under the umbrella of the Redd Center, Rensink is the host and producer of the monthly Writing Westward Podcast and the general editor and project manager of the Intermountain Histories digital public history project. The current holder of the endowed professorial chair connected with the institution is Ignacio Garcia a professor of late 20th century US and Hispanic people in the US history, currently holds the endowed Lemuel Hardison Redd, Jr. Chair. The center was founded in 1972.
- DNA Sequence Center: This is a lab that sequences DNA for other BYU labs and the like. Its main purpose is to centralize DNA sequencing to reduce administrative costs, material costs and provide for efficient processing.
- Eyring Research Institute
- Institute of Computer Uses in Education. This organizations was formed in 1972 at BYU by people from BYU's Instructional Research Development Department and the University of Texas at Austin's CAI Laboratory. This group was contracted by MITRE Corporation to develop the instructional programs initial for English and math known as the TICCIT Project.
- Joseph Fielding Smith Institute for Church History
- BYU Women's Research Institute: This was formed during the presidency of Dallin H. Oaks with Marilyn Arnold as the first head. It was an early sponsoring organization behind the BYU Women's Conference. However, this function was later shift to other organizations. In the fall of 2009 it was announced that most of the functions of the Women's Research Institute would be shifted to the Women's Studies Minor within the College of Family, Home and Social Sciences and at least initially planned to be specifically under the sociology department. This was partly a result of not being able to find someone to fill in for Bonnie Ballif-Spanvill who had directed the institute for about two decades.
- FARMS/Neal A. Maxwell Institute for Religious Scholarship
- New World Archaeology Foundation
- BYU Religious Studies Center: The BYU Religious Studies Center facilitates research and publication in topics related to LDS Church history and doctrine.
- The University Archeology Society: The University Archeology Society was a research corporation at BYU from 1949 until 1956. In the latter year it became independent and was renamed the Society for Early Historic Archaeology.
