= FamilySearch Research Wiki =

Genealogy wiki

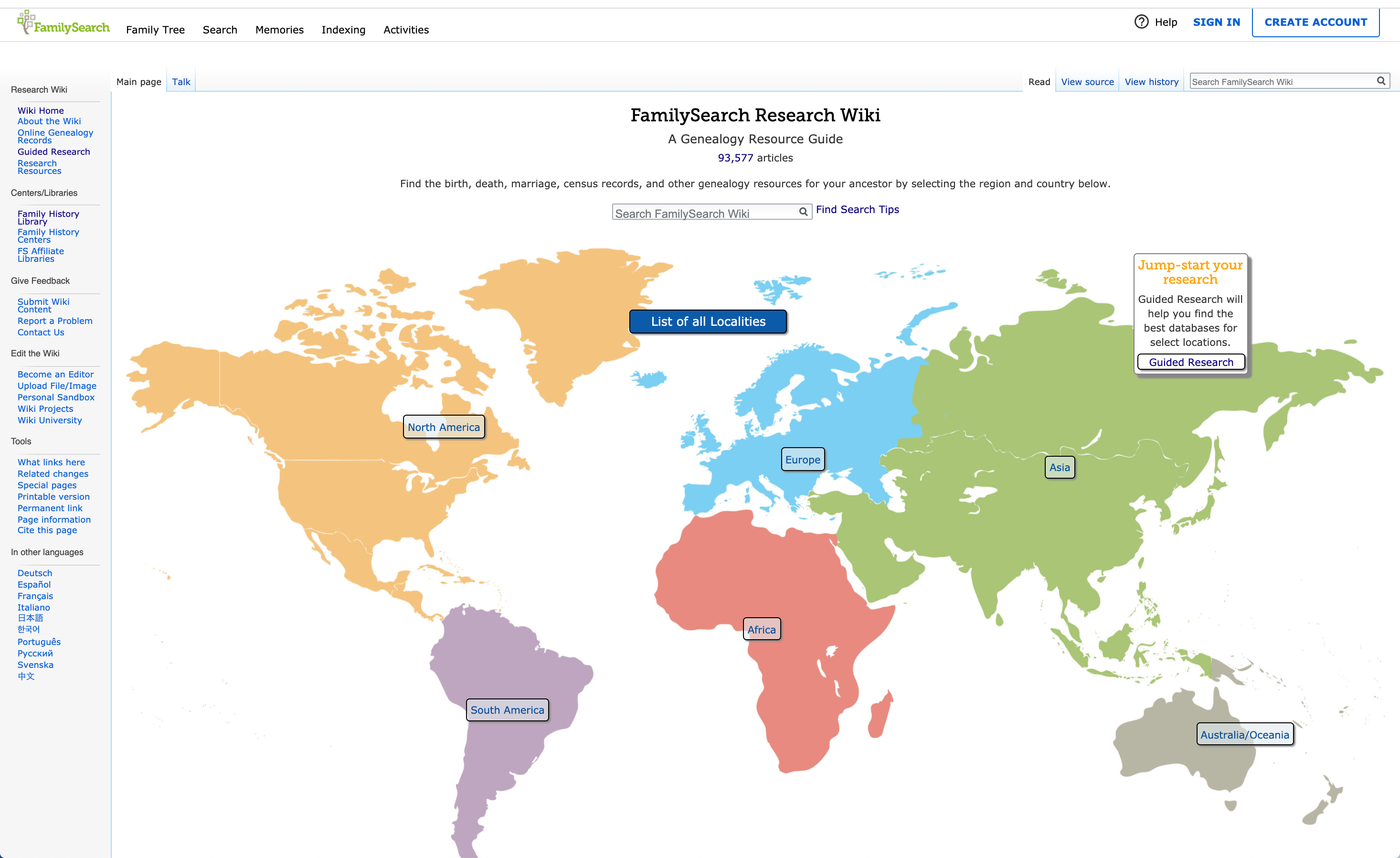
- Homepage of FamilySearch Research Wiki
- Website type: Genealogy research
- Available in: 11 languages (as of July 2014)
- Owner: The Church of Jesus Christ of Latter-day Saints
- Creator: FamilySearch
- Website: Official Webpage
- Registration: Required for contributors
- Launched: December 14, 2007
- Current status: Active
- Content license: Creative Commons
- Written in: MediaWiki

The FamilySearch Research Wiki (formerly also known as the FamilySearch Wiki or the Family History Research Wiki) is a website containing reference information and educational articles to help locate and interpret genealogical records. The wiki is part of the FamilySearch website and was launched in 2007. It is a free-access, free-content online directory and handbook that uses a wiki platform to organize pages. Content is created collaboratively by a member base made up of FamilySearch employees, Mormon missionaries, and the wider online community. As of 2024, pages can be edited only by registered contributors who have completed training on current content policy.

The site itself does not contain information about people or pedigrees, contains no photos or records, and does not accept genealogical queries. Rather, it helps users discover other websites and resources to find such information.

== Content ==
Content on the website is organised into article pages, most of which focus on a specific place. For example, a place may be a town, county, state, province, or nation. Each place article provides guidance on the specific types of records available in that jurisdiction. Every nation worldwide has at least one article, with more extensive coverage for places in the United States, Canada, and Europe.

Content for a place article may include maps, primary repository contact information, organization dates, parent jurisdictions, internal subdivisions such as towns or counties, boundary changes, any record losses or gaps, neighboring localities, local record types, local migration routes, and other local libraries, archives, societies, or museums. Contributors may also include information about record start and stop dates, social life and customs that affected local record keeping, local record idiosyncrasies, records housed in unusual places, and tips for using the records more effectively.

Pages also exist for genealogical, historical, and surname societies.

Religious doctrines, church policies, and religious images are not permitted on the Family History Research Wiki except where they directly impact genealogical research.

== History ==
=== Content ===
Starting about 1988, the FamilySearch Library in Salt Lake City, then known as the Family History Library, developed a series of "research outlines" to aid volunteer staff at its many FamilySearch Center branches, who offered free research advice to visitors. When the FamilySearch Research Wiki was launched in late 2007, the electronic copies of these paper outlines were transferred into the wiki.

This resulted in about 162 initial articles, of which 86 were front-page articles, with each linked to around 25 related topical sub-pages. For example, the front-page article New Jersey Genealogy was linked to the New Jersey Biography, New Jersey Cemeteries, and New Jersey Census pages. Much of the early structure and phrasing of the wiki can be attributed to these publications.

=== Platform ===
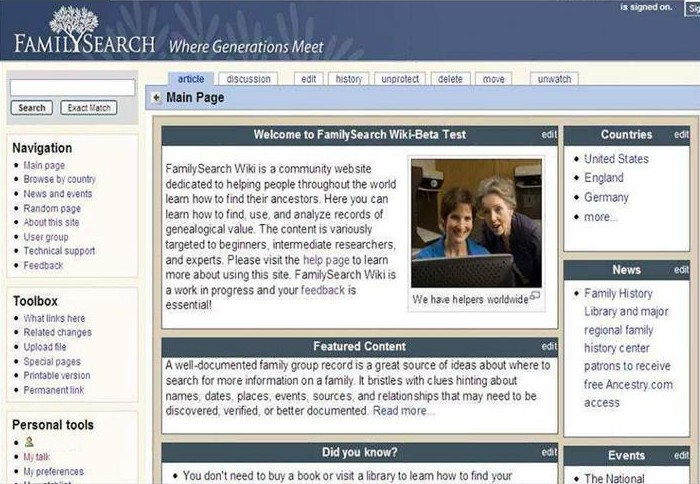
Screenshot of the FamilySearch Wiki MainPage in 2007-2008

The English-language wiki was launched on December 14, 2007. Initially, it used Plone software.

It was soon determined that MediaWiki software would be a better platform, and in January 2008, it was moved to MediaWiki. As of 2009, moderators had been introduced on the platform. In October 2011, FamilySearch deployed the wiki in 10 additional languages. In 2011, a Wiki Governance Team was set up, which in 2015 was replaced by the Governance Council whose role was to oversee the direction and management of the Research Wiki.

In late March 2016, the wiki was transitioned to WikiMedia 1.23.10, a newer, more stable platform which required less maintenance from FamilySearch computer engineers. FamilySearch management dissolved the Wiki Governance Council in April 2021 and replaced it with a Wiki Executive Council. In 2024 the Executive Council suspended the Adopt-a-Page program and the wiki Moderators program. In July 2024, all users' editing rights were suspended, with contributors now required to complete training and pass a test on current FamilySearch content policy before contributing. As of September 2024, it used MediaWiki version 1.39.6.

== Reception ==
The Family History Research Wiki receives over 100 million views per year. During most months, it is typically the second-most frequently visited section (out of ten sections) of FamilySearch, its host site. As of March 7, 2016, the English edition of the Family History Research Wiki had 150,561 registered users who had contributed to the creation of over 82,858 articles.

This resource has been discussed by expert authors in how-to books, in periodicals, by instructors at genealogical conferences and classes, on internet sites, and in blogs. James Tanner wrote on his blog Genealogy's Star in 2014 that the Research Wiki was "the one most valuable genealogical resource on the Web." In a 2014 radio interview, the Federation of Genealogical Societies praised the wiki for its potential benefits to local research and genealogical societies, recommending that societies add themselves to the wiki's database.
