= J. Roman Andrus =

American painter

James Roman Andrus
- Born: 1907; St. George, Utah, U.S.
- Died: June 23, 1993 (aged 85–86); Provo, Utah, U.S.
- Resting place: Provo City Cemetery
- Education: Brigham Young University; University of Colorado Boulder
- Occupations: Painter, printmaker, educator
- Spouse: Ira Rose Pratt

J. Roman Andrus (1907 — June 23, 1993) was an American painter, printmaker, and educator. He taught art at Brigham Young University for more than three decades.

== Life ==
Andrus was born in 1907 in St. George, Utah. He graduated from Brigham Young University, where he earned a bachelor's degree in 1942 and a master's degree in 1943. He earned a PhD from the University of Colorado Boulder in 1958.

Andrus taught in the Department of Art at Brigham Young University from 1940 to 1974. He was also a painter and printmaker. He won the Institute of Fine Arts Purchase Prize in 1945 and 1950. Andrus served on the board of the Utah Symphony. According to the Utah Artists Project, "The overpowering interest in Andrus's work is in the interplay of color and rhythm."

Andrus was a member of the Church of Jesus Christ of Latter-day Saints, and he married Ira Rose Pratt in the St. George Utah Temple. They had three sons and a daughter. Andrus died on June 23, 1993, in Provo, Utah, at age 85, and he was buried in the Provo City Cemetery. His work is in the collection of the National Gallery of Art in Washington, D.C., but not currently on view.
