= FamilySearch Indexing =

FamilySearch Indexing is a volunteer project established and run by FamilySearch, a genealogy organization of the Church of Jesus Christ of Latter-day Saints. The project aims to create searchable digital indexes of scanned images of historical documents that are relevant to genealogy. The documents include census records, birth and death certificates, marriage licenses, military and property records, and other vital records maintained by local, state, and national governments. However, to access the billions of names that appear on these images, indexes are needed to be able to search them efficiently.

Since FamilySearch indexing began in 2006, this crowdsourcing effort has produced more than one billion searchable records. The digital images and corresponding indexes are valuable to professionals, hobbyists, and family organization researchers.

== How it works ==
Volunteers (including jail inmates) use online software on the FamilySearch website to download images of historical documents. They then read the information on the image and transcribe the information. A second, more experienced volunteer reviews this information for accuracy before it is submitted. Indexed records eventually can be searched on the FamilySearch website.

From 2006 to 2017 FamilySearch Indexing was only available as a downloadable program, and two volunteers separately indexed each document. A third person checked their work for accuracy. As of 2016, FamilySearch Indexing is also available as a web-based effort.

== Types of records ==
Up to December 2008, the FamilySearch Indexing project focused primarily on indexing state and federal census records from the United States of America, though census records from Mexico and vital records from other locales have also been indexed. In 2012, FamilySearch Indexing collaborated with Archives.com and FindMyPast to index the 1940 US Federal Census. In 2014, an emphasis was placed on obituary projects. As of December 2015, the organization had indexed 1,379,890,025 records since its inception. As of July 2018 there were 226 active indexing projects, with documents from all over the world being indexed. The majority of projects come from either North America or Europe. The United States is the country with the most records but a majority of projects now come from outside the United States.

In addition to the general indexing projects, the site also partners with other genealogical organizations to complete specialized indexing projects. Partners have included the Arkansas Genealogical Society, the Black History Museum, the Indiana Genealogical Society, the Ohio Genealogical Society, the US National Archives and Records Administration, and the Utah Genealogical Association.

On September 21, 2021, FamilySearch Indexing announced that it had completed full digitization of its entire collection of 2.4 million rolls of microfilm. The rolls represented records from over 200 countries and more than 11.5 billion individuals.

== See also ==
- Genealogy
- Crowdsourcing software development
- Granite Mountain Records Vault
