= Archibald F. Bennett =

American historian (1896–1965)

- Born: Archibald Fowler Bennett; March 17, 1896; Dingle, Idaho, U.S.
- Died: August 28, 1965 (aged 69); American Fork, Utah, U.S.
- Resting place: Salt Lake City Cemetery
- Education: University of Utah (BA, MA)
- Occupation: Historian
- Spouse: Ella Milner (m. 1921)

Archibald Fowler Bennett (March 17, 1896 – August 28, 1965) was a longtime employee of the Genealogical Society of Utah who was such a figure in the promotion of family history research in the Church of Jesus Christ of Latter-day Saints that he became known as "Mr. Genealogy".

== Early life ==
Archibald Fowler Bennett was born to William David Bennett and Emma Neat on March 27, 1896, at Dingle, Idaho. In May 1899 his parents accepted a request from Lorenzo Snow to settle in southern Alberta, Canada, and work on the canal which was being built there. They travelled all of July in covered wagons and settled in Magrath. The family moved to Taber in 1907, where he graduated high school in 1914. After attending Normal School at Calgary, Alberta, in 1915 and receiving a First-Class Teacher's Certificate, he taught in Neidpath, Marchessault and Barnwell.

Bennett enlisted March 26, 1916, in the 13th Canadian Mounted Rifles after listening to a recruiting speech by Hugh B. Brown. He sailed for England in June and was transferred to the Fort Garry Horse in the Canadian Cavalry Brigade. He served in France from 1916 to May 1919, and was discharged in Winnipeg June 2. His father died October 24, 1916, while Bennett was overseas.

When Bennett returned to Canada he taught school for one year in the Taber High School, and then in the Knight Academy in Raymond. He married Ella Milner on December 21, 1921, in the Salt Lake Temple.

Bennett attended the University of Utah, working in the evenings in the office of the Superior Baking Co. In 1923, with about 500 others, he took the Civil Service Examination for Postal Clerk, and as he received the highest rating, was appointed a Clerk and worked full-time in the Money Order & Registry Division in the evenings. This greatly simplified the problem of financing his schooling and supporting his family. He graduated with a B.A. degree in 1925 and was elected to the National Honor Society, Phi Kappa Phi. He went on to receive his M.A. in 1926 in History and Political Science.

== Genealogy ==
His interest and training in genealogy began when he helped his mother in a Relief Society course in Genealogy when he was 15. His interest continued in genealogical research and he did much research on his family and for others whenever he could go to the Genealogical Society of Utah. Several articles by him were published in the quarterly of the Society, "Romance of a Pedigree" in 1927 and "A Legacy from the Past" in 1928.

On September 1, 1928, while preparing to go east to obtain a doctorate, he accepted an offer to become Secretary of the Genealogical Society of Utah and to edit the Utah Genealogical and Historical Magazine; a year later he was also appointed as organization's Librarian. He served in the Genealogical Society of Utah, later the Genealogical Society of The Church of Jesus Christ of Latter-day Saints, until 1961. He developed the Pedigree Chart and Family Group Record used in the LDS Church's genealogical record system. He became a research specialist who helped people with their research problems, and was referred to as "Mr. Genealogy."

When Genealogical instruction was incorporated in the LDS Church's Sunday School curriculum in 1940, Bennett became a member of the Sunday School General Board, serving until 1962. Brigham Young University, which had begun teaching genealogy in 1921, had Bennett instruct starting in 1952, and taught two classes twice a week at BYU for 15 years, while also carrying on his other assignments.

Bennett supervised the beginning of microfilming by the society. In 1946 Bennett was assigned by the Utah Genealogical Society to approach the officials of record repositories in the Eastern United States for official permission to microfilm their records, in exchange for a microfilm copy of the records they filmed. Another enticement was that the Society would permanently hold "security copies" on film of otherwise irreplaceable documents, should anything happen to the original records. While Ernst Koehler made the microfilms, Bennett traveled from state to state finding people who would allow the society to film their records. Through these efforts records from nine eastern states were microfilmed.

In 1947 he was sent to Europe for four months representing the Genealogical Society in making contacts in England, Wales, the Netherlands, Norway and Italy for permission to microfilm extensive collections of parish registers, probate, census and military records. In 1948 he went to Europe again to complete microfilming arrangements in these countries and in Germany, Switzerland and France, and he also supervised the copying of the Vaudois Protestant records from Italy.

In November 1962 he was elected a Fellow of the American Society of Genealogists.

Bennett was appointed Supervisor of Genealogical Education for the Society and throughout the LDS Church in 1963, with responsibility for approval of all instructors of genealogical courses given by BYU, and of general courses given by the Genealogical Society. He also served on Committees of Microfilm Planning, Records Approval, Education and Publication. He was appointed a member of the Priesthood Genealogical Conference Staff, assigned to go with General Authorities to quarterly Stake conferences to stress genealogy.

In 1964 the Board of Trustees of the Society approved a Branch Library program, and Bennett was appointed Librarian in charge of the new program. He organized and guided each of the 21 branch libraries that opened between 1964 and August 1965.

Bennett died of a heart attack August 28, 1965, at age 69 in American Fork, en route to a Priesthood Genealogical assignment in Provo, and was buried September 1 in the Salt Lake City Cemetery.

== Works ==
Bennett wrote genealogy manuals used by the LDS Sunday Schools, Relief Society, and BYU. A number of his writings were printed in the Improvement Era, The Instructor, and the Church News.

His most famous work was Saviors on Mount Zion, which was used as a manual by the LDS Church Sunday School in 1950.

His other works include A Guide for Genealogical Research; Valiant in the Faith: Gardner and Sarah Snow and their Family (with Ella M. Bennett and Barbara Bennett Roach); Our Legacy from William and Elizabeth New: New, Neat, Nate, Passey, Oakey, Ellsworth families with Blanche Bennett Nordgren; Searching with Success: a genealogical text; Family Exaltation; Finding your Forefathers in America and Proving your Pedigree.

He also published journal articles including "The Vaudois of the Alpine Valleys and their Contribution to Utah and Latter-day Saint History" in the Winter 1960 edition of BYU Studies. An article he wrote on the descendants of Richard Bennett of Virginia was published in the William & Mary Quarterly in 1936.

Hymns Alexander Schreiner, Tabernacle Organist and fellow Sunday School Board member asked Bennett to write the words for a hymn on temple service for a new hymn book to be published in 1948. "Holy Temples on Mount Zion" was the poem chosen from the two he wrote, and was set to music by Schreiner. It is hymn #289 in the 1985 English-language LDS Hymnal.

Television In the first series of its kind to be produced on television, Bennett presented a series of 42 TV shows on genealogy in 1954 over KDYL-TV, sponsored by Brigham Young University and the Utah Genealogical Society. He was author and moderator of the program, and was assisted by Mrs. Arta Ballif of the BYU Speech Department. "What's Your Name?" demonstrated interesting phases of genealogical research, and the first one featured the pedigree of President Eisenhower. Other interesting pedigrees demonstrating the principles and procedure of research followed. During the half-hour program, many individuals themselves were introduced and took part on each program.
