= Harold B. Lee Library =

Main campus library for Brigham Young University

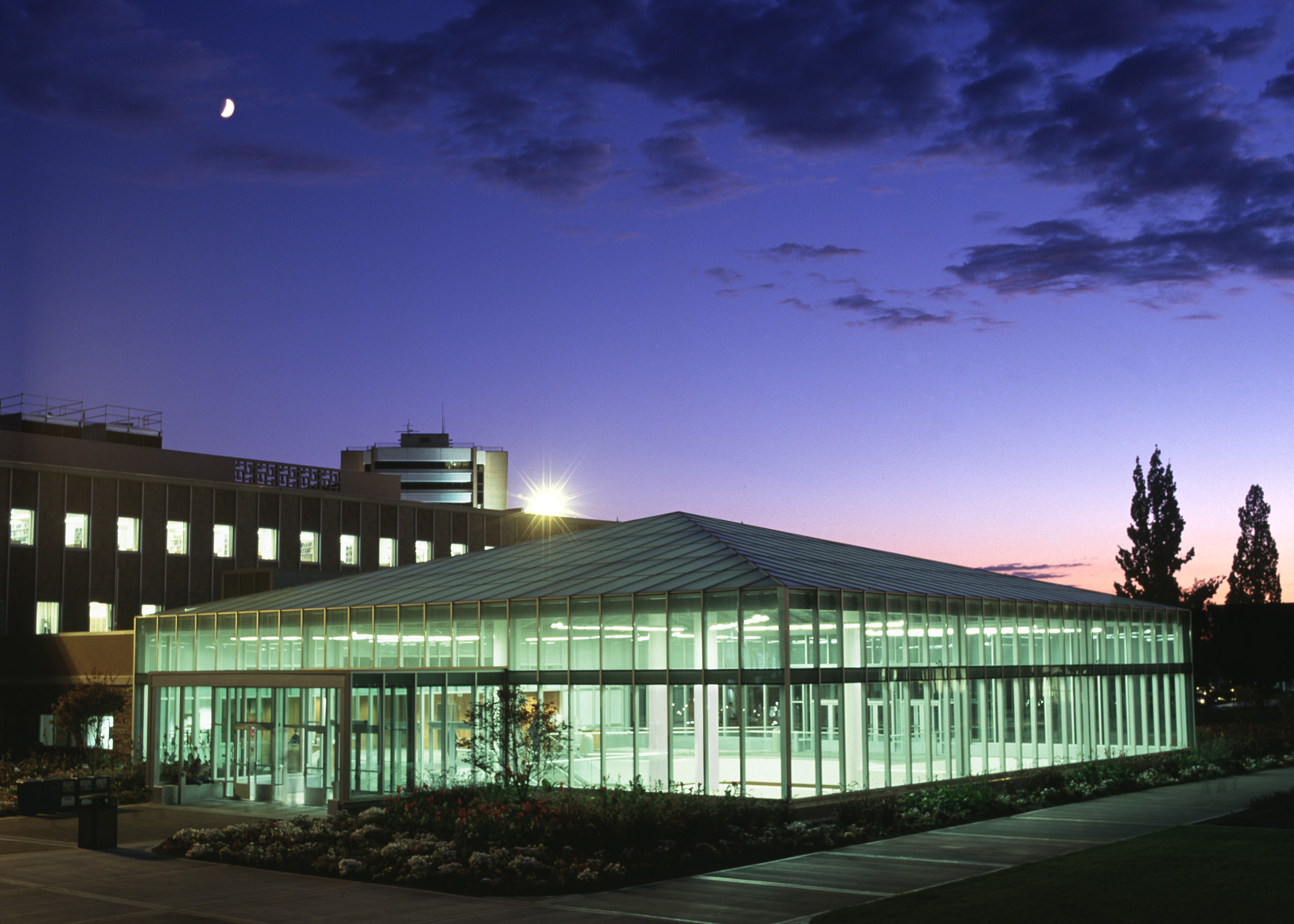
- Library main entrance at night
- 40°14′57″N 111°38′57″W
- Location: Provo, Utah, United States
- Type: Academic library
- Established: 1925

Access and use
- Population served: Brigham Young University

Other information
- Director: Rick Anderson
- Employees: 160 (2025)
- Website: lib.byu.edu

The Harold B. Lee Library (HBLL) is the main academic library of Brigham Young University (BYU) located in Provo, Utah. The library traces its roots to the late 19th century and has been renamed, relocated, and expanded various times to accommodate the growth of its collection. It was renamed in 1973 after Harold B. Lee, the 11th president of the Church of Jesus Christ of Latter-day Saints (LDS Church).

== History ==
The HBLL traces its roots to the late 19th century. Karl G. Maeser, who served as principal of Brigham Young Academy (the precursor to BYU) from 1876 to 1892, had a collection of books in his office that served as the first semblance of a library at the school. In 1891, the collection moved out of the principal's office and into a room in the Education Building on the lower part of campus.

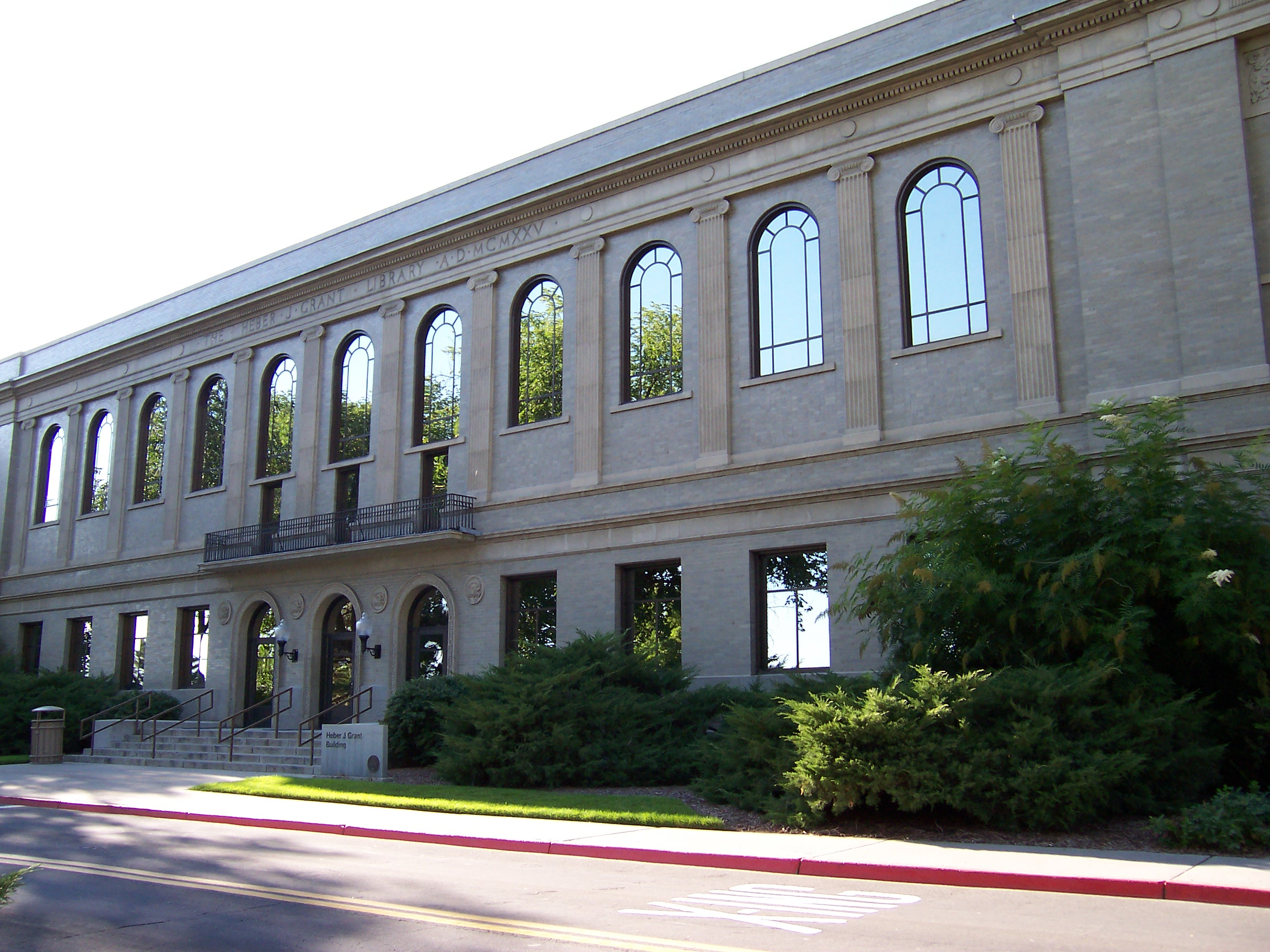
The library was formerly housed in the Heber J. Grant Building.

In 1925, the collection became a proper library with its own dedicated building when the Heber J. Grant Library (known later as the Heber J. Grant Building) was completed. By the 1950s, the collection along with the needs of the university's students had grown substantially, and planning began for a new facility.

In 1961, the library collection moved into a newly built facility and renamed the J. Reuben Clark Library, after J. Reuben Clark, a prominent LDS Church leader who also served as the 7th United States Under Secretary of State. The library's collection reached 500,000 volumes in 1965, and it began offering a dial-up access system in 1969 for patrons to access music, lectures, and foreign language recordings.

In 1973, BYU opened a law school, also naming it after Clark. To avoid confusion with the school on campus, the library changed its name to the HBLL in honor of Harold B. Lee, the 11th LDS Church president. A six-story addition was completed in 1976, doubling the library's physical space and increasing the library's seating capacity from 2,500 to 4,500. The addition had moveable walls, integrated student study spaces into the stacks, added group study rooms, and included a vault for archival materials. Art professor and artist Franz M. Johansen created four cast stone panels used to decorate the south entrance of the library and representing four areas of human knowledge.

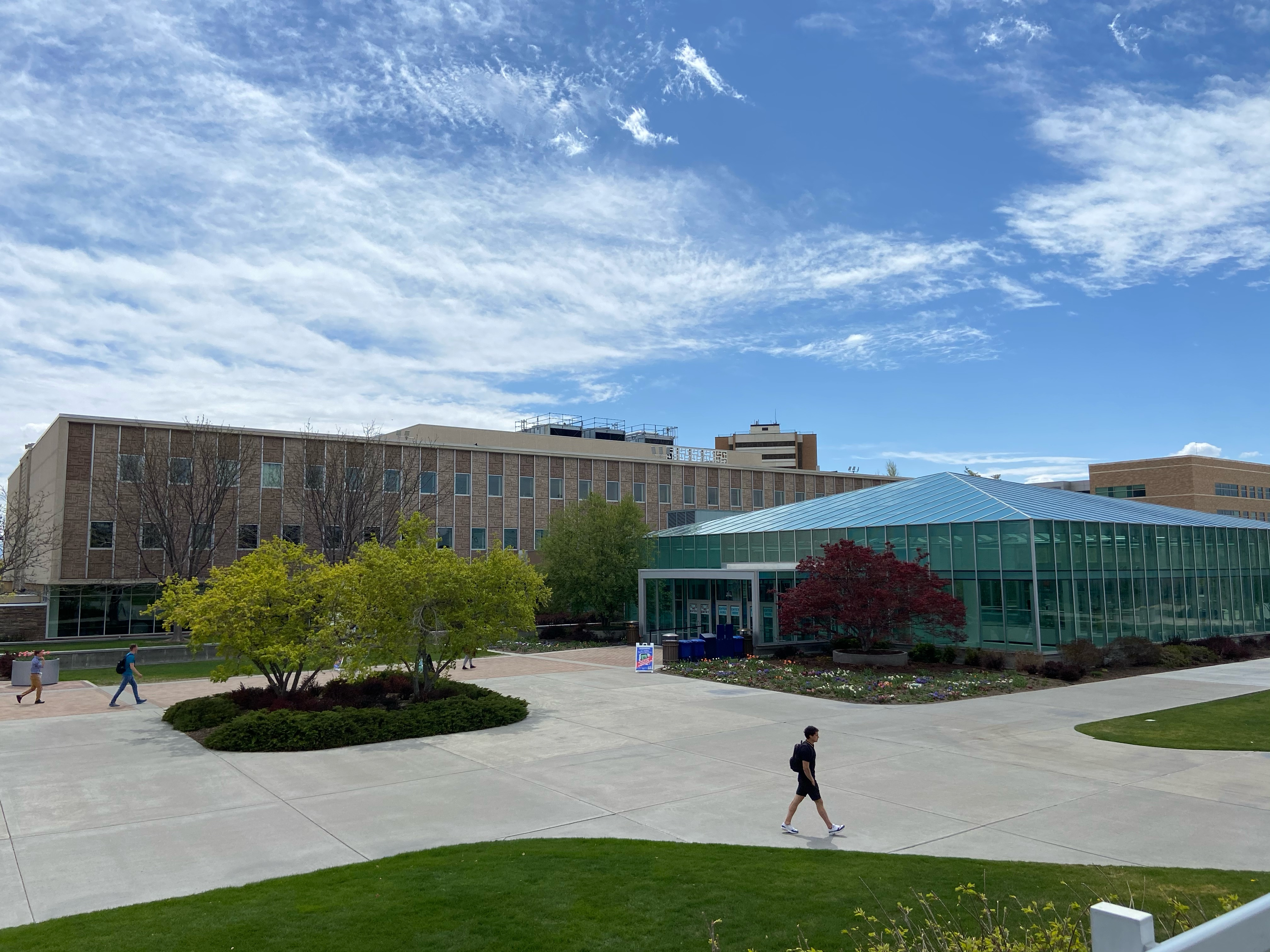
The Harold B. Lee Library in April of 2021

In 1999, the L. Tom Perry Special Collections wing of the library was added, with contents at the time valued at $153 million. In 2014, the library was named one of the "25 Most Used Digital Libraries in the Country". HBLL became a member of the Association of Research Libraries, and during the COVID-19 pandemic in 2020, BYU shut down part of the library because students weren’t in compliance with the school's mask policies.

== Facilities ==
The HBLL is located at the center of BYU's main campus. It has 6 floors, with 98 miles of shelving, more than 6 million items and a seating capacity of 4,600 people. It serves over 10,000 patrons each day, and it features a writing center, a cafe, a media center, a family friendly study room, individual and group study rooms, a family history library, and various collections including a special vault area for the L. Tom Perry Special Collections Library. The library is a CONSER (Cooperative Serials) program liaison for the U.S. Library of Congress, serving as an "authoritative source for bibliographic records, documentation, and training materials for serials cataloging".

== Collections ==
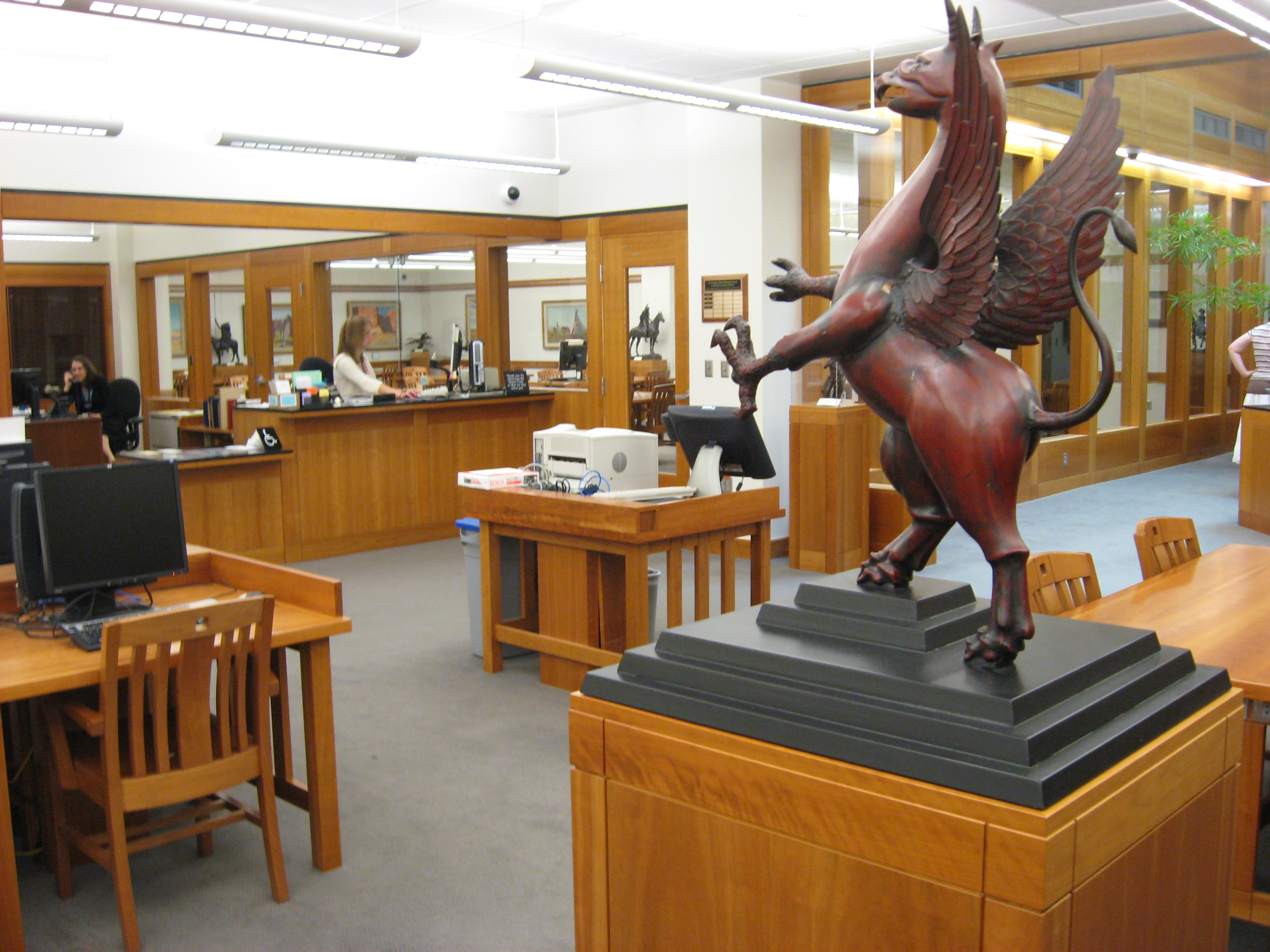
L. Tom Perry Special Collections, housed inside the Harold B. Lee Library

The HBLL includes a family history library, the Primrose International Viola Archive, and the International Harp Archives. It also has a special vault area for the L. Tom Perry Special Collections Library, which contains various religious texts including a 17th century Old Norse Bible, and a variety of film-related items including Oscar statuettes and a Cecil B. DeMille collection.

== See also ==
- University libraries in the United States
