= FamilySearch =

Genealogy organization operated by the LDS Church

FamilySearch International
- Predecessor: Genealogical Society of Utah
- Formation: November 13, 1894; 131 years ago
- Founders: Franklin D. Richards; James H. Anderson; A. Milton Musser
- Founded at: Salt Lake City, Utah, U.S.
- Type: Nonprofit organization
- Location: Salt Lake City, Utah, U.S.
- Region served: Worldwide
- Services: Record digitization and preservation; digital record access; genealogical collaboration tools; genealogical training
- President and CEO: Steve Rockwood
- Parent organization: The Church of Jesus Christ of Latter-day Saints
- Website: www.familysearch.org

FamilySearch is a nonprofit organization and website offering genealogical records, education, and software. It is operated by the Church of Jesus Christ of Latter-day Saints (LDS Church) and is part of the church's Family History Department (FHD). The FHD was originally established in 1894, as the Genealogical Society of Utah (GSU); it is the largest genealogy organization in the world.

FamilySearch maintains a collection of records, resources, and services designed to help people learn more about their family history. Facilitating the performance of Latter-day Saint ordinances for deceased relatives is another major aim of the organization. Although it requires user account registration, it offers free access to its resources and service online at FamilySearch.org. In addition, FamilySearch offers personal assistance at more than 6,400 FamilySearch centers in 140 countries, including the FamilySearch Library in Salt Lake City, Utah. The Family Tree section allows user-generated content to be contributed to the genealogical database. As of March 2023, there are over 1.5 billion individuals in the tree and the historical records database contains over 5.7 billion digital images, including digitized books, digitized microfilm, and other digital records.

== History ==
=== Genealogical Society of Utah ===
Logo of the Genealogical Society of Utah

GSU, the predecessor of FamilySearch, was founded on 1 November 1894. Its purpose was to create a genealogical library to be used both by its members and other people, to share educational information about genealogy, and to gather genealogical records in order to perform religious ordinances for the dead. It was founded under the direction of church leaders, when the First Presidency appointed Franklin D. Richards as the first president.

The society published the Utah Genealogical and Historical Magazine from 1910 to 1940.

Reading room of the Genealogical Society of Utah in 1919, located in the Church Administration Building

The GSU began microfilming records of genealogical importance in 1938. In 1963, the microfilm collection was moved to the newly completed Granite Mountain Records Vault for long-term preservation.

In 1975, the GSU became the church's Genealogical Department, which later became the FHD. At that time, its head officer was renamed president from executive director, starting during Theodore M. Burton's term. However, the title "President of the Genealogical Society of Utah" and other GSU titles were still used and bestowed upon department officers.

In 2000, the church consolidated its Family History and Historical departments into the Family and Church History Department, and Richard E. Turley Jr. became managing director of the new department and president of the GSU. Later this decision was reversed and the FHD was separated from the Church History Department, becoming its own department.

In 2008, the Vatican issued a statement calling the practice known as baptism for the dead "erroneous" and directing Catholic dioceses to keep parish records from Latter-day Saints performing genealogical research. (Note: The Catholic Church's concern was that ostensibly faithful deceased Catholics being posthumously baptized into another religion without their consent (or their family's consent). They sought to curtail any further efforts by Mormons to identify deceased Catholics for proxy baptism.)

==== Presidents of the Genealogical Society of Utah ====
Name	Term	Notes
Franklin D. Richards	1894–99	
Anthon H. Lund	1900–21	
Charles W. Penrose	1921–25	
Anthony W. Ivins	1925–34	
Joseph Fielding Smith	1934–61	
Junius Jackson	1961–62	
N. Eldon Tanner	1963	
Howard W. Hunter	1964–72	
Theodore M. Burton	1972–78	
J. Thomas Fyans	1978	
Royden G. Derrick	1979–84	
Richard G. Scott	1984–88	
J. Richard Clarke	1988–93	
Monte J. Brough	1993–2000?	
Richard E. Turley Jr.	2000?–08	

=== FamilySearch ===
FamilySearch logo used 2006–2013

In 1998, the GSU began digital imaging of records and in about August 1998 the decision was made by church leaders to build a genealogical website. In May 1999, the website first opened to the public as FamilySearch. The beta version, released April 1, almost immediately went offline, overloaded because of high popularity. Only a few days after the official launch, the website had received an estimated 100 million hits. To handle the load, site visitors were only given access to the site for 15 minutes at a time. In November 1999, 240 million names were added, bringing the total number of entries to 640 million.

In 2009, the church launched a collaborative tree known as "New FamilySearch". It was the precursor to the current "FamilySearch Family Tree", and was only available to church members. The system was an attempt to combine multiple genealogical submissions to FamilySearch's databases into one single tree, but it did not allow users to edit information that they had not submitted. It also was difficult to add sources to individuals in the tree or determine what was the correct information among multiple submissions. By April 2011, plans were in place to redesign the database into a more collaborative platform.

In 2011, the FamilySearch website received a major redesign. The previous site had allowed users to only search one database at a time, but the new version allowed sitewide searches of multiple databases. It also included the addition of more databases as well as some digitized and indexed microfilms.

On 16 November 2012, it was announced that the new Family Tree database would be available to all users of New FamilySearch, and that the New FamilySearch database would eventually be phased out. On 5 March 2013, it was announced that Family Tree would now be available to everyone, whether or not they were members of the church. On 16 April 2013, FamilySearch completely revamped the site design generally, with new features and a changed color scheme. Some of the new features include an interactive fan chart and some printing capabilities, as well as the ability to add photos to Family Tree.

In February 2014, FamilySearch announced partnerships with Ancestry.com, findmypast and MyHeritage, which includes sharing massive amounts of their databases with those companies, and members of the church receiving free subscriptions with these companies. They also have a standing relationship with BillionGraves, in which the photographed and indexed images of graves are both searchable on FamilySearch and are linked to individuals in the family tree. At the end of 2015, FamilyTree had 1.1 billion persons added by 2.47 million contributors.

In August 2017, FamilySearch discontinued distribution of physical microfilm to its family history centers due to large-scale availability of digital images of those films and planned digitization of remaining films. In May 2018, FamilySearch added and digitized its 2 billionth record. In September 2020, FamilySearch announced that it now includes 8 billion names, 3.2 billion digital images, and 490,000 digital books, with over 1 million new records each day. 7 billion names from almost every country were added within the last 10 years.

== Activities ==
=== RootsTech ===
Since 2011, FamilySearch International has organized an annual family history and technology conference called RootsTech. It is held annually in the Salt Palace Convention Center, Salt Lake City, Utah. The conference is attended by professional and amateur genealogists, technology developers, and church members. In 2014 there were nearly 13,000 people in attendance. As of 2020, it is the world's largest family history and technology conference in the world. It is the successor to three former conferences: the Conference on Computerized Family History and Genealogy, the Family History Technology Workshop and the FamilySearch Developers Conference.

== Website ==
=== Historical Records ===
The main service of the FamilySearch website is to offer access to digital images and indexes of genealogical records. These images can be searched along with a number of databases. While access to the records is always free, some records have restricted access, and can only be viewed at a FamilySearch Center, at an Affiliate Library, or by church members. FamilySearch.org also contains the catalog of the FamilySearch Library in Salt Lake City, Utah. The library holds genealogical records for over 110 countries, territories, and possessions, including over 2.4 million rolls of microfilmed genealogical records; 742,000 microfiche; 490,000 books, serials, and other formats; and 4,500 periodicals.

=== FamilySearch Family Tree ===
FamilySearch FamilyTree (FSFT) is a "one world tree," or a unified database that aims to contain one entry for each person recorded in genealogical records. All FamilySearch users are able to add persons, link them to existing persons or merge duplicates. Sources, images, and audio files can also be attached to persons in the tree.

There are also several features specific to the membership of the church, facilitating temple ordinance work. In keeping with an agreement with Jewish groups and to prevent abuse, performing ordinances for Holocaust victims or celebrities results in account suspension until the researcher proves a legitimate family connection to the subject of their search. FamilySearch allows users to input same-sex marriages or other unions.

=== Indexing projects ===
Searchable indexes of the records on FamilySearch are created by volunteers of the FamilySearch Indexing program. To ensure greater accuracy, each batch of records is indexed by an indexer and is then checked by a more experienced indexer. Indexing volunteers need not be members of the Church. FamilySearch is currently working with genealogical societies all around the world to index local projects.

At the end of 2010, 548 million vital records had been transcribed and made publicly available through the FamilySearch website. In April 2013, FamilySearch Indexing completed their goal to offer 1 billion indexed records online.

=== Education ===
FamilySearch offers free lessons on FamilySearch.org to help people learn how to find their ancestors. The topics range from basic research to training on specific record types and are designed for both beginners and experienced researchers. Most of the classes come from research consultants in the Family History Library in Salt Lake City, but FamilySearch is also collaborating with partners such as the Mid-Continent Public Library in Independence, Missouri, to record and post classes.

In 2007, it was decided to start a FamilySearch Research Wiki to help FamilySearch users and others researching genealogy and family history to find and share information on data sources and research tips. The first version of the wiki was built on the Plone wiki software product, but it was soon discovered that MediaWiki software was much more suitable, so in January 2008 it was moved to the MediaWiki platform. In the intervening years it was rolled out in other languages, and as of July 2014 it was available in 11 languages. The other language wikis are found via links at the bottom of the wiki homepage. The wiki in English had over 79,500 articles and over 150,000 registered users as of July 2014.

== Facilities ==
=== FamilySearch Library ===
FamilySearch operates the FamilySearch Library in Salt Lake City, Utah. The library was built in 1985 as a successor to previous libraries run by the GSU. The library is open to the public and has a large collection of international genealogical materials, including microfilm, books, and digital materials. The library's catalog and many of their digital materials are located at the FamilySearch website.

=== Granite Mountain Records Vault ===
FamilySearch stores copies of their records in a dry, environment-controlled facility built into Granite Mountain in Little Cottonwood Canyon, near Salt Lake City, Utah. The storage facility is known as the Granite Mountain Records Vault. The vault stores over 2.4 million rolls of microfilm and 1 million microfiches.

=== FamilySearch Centers ===
FamilySearch operates over 6,300 FamilySearch Centers in 140 countries around the world as of 2023. The centers are branches of the FamilySearch Library, often located in LDS Church meetinghouses. Their purpose is to help people with their genealogy and provide access to and help with genealogical materials and software provided by FamilySearch.

== See also ==
- Baptism for the dead § Genealogy and baptism
- GEDCOM
- Immigrant Ancestors Project
- List of Mormon family organizations
- Personal Ancestral File
