= FamilySearch Library =

Genealogical library of The Church of Jesus Christ of Latter-day Saints

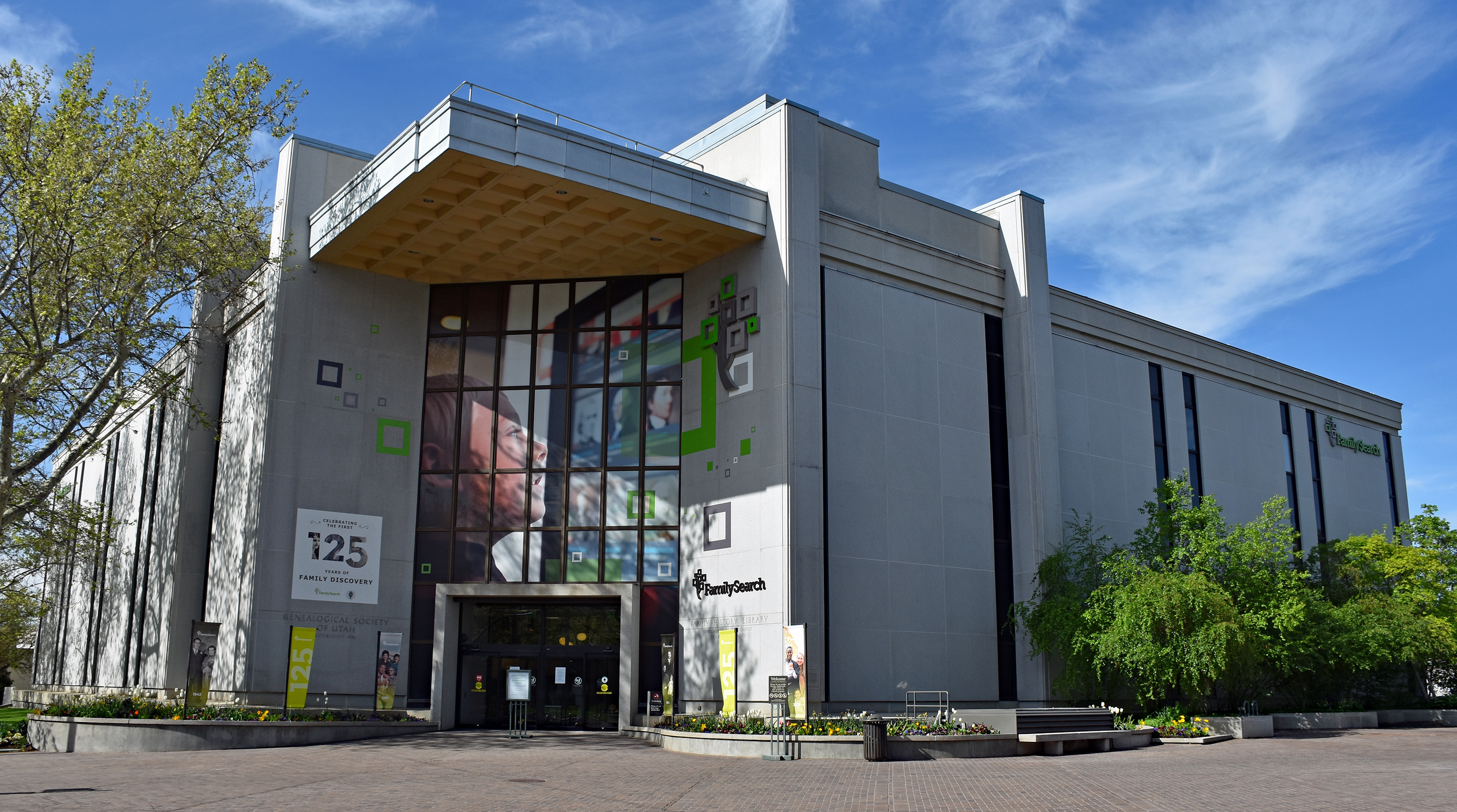
- Library entrance
- 40°46′13.44″N 111°53′39.3108″W
- Location: Salt Lake City, Utah, United States
- Type: Genealogy library
- Established: 1894
- Branch of: The Church of Jesus Christ of Latter-day Saints
- Branches: 6,600+ (2026); FamilySearch Center

Collection
- Size: 1.3 million rolls of microfilmed genealogical records; 190,000 microfiche; 340,000 books, serials, and other formats; and 125,500 periodicals

Other information
- Director: Lynn Turner
- Website: familysearch.org/en/library

The FamilySearch Library (FSL), formerly the Family History Library, is a genealogical research facility in downtown Salt Lake City. The library is open to the public free of charge and is operated by FamilySearch, the genealogical arm of the Church of Jesus Christ of Latter-day Saints (LDS Church).

== History ==
The origins of the FSL can be traced to the founding of the Genealogical Society of Utah (GSU) in 1894. Through time the FSL has changed locations within Salt Lake City as follows:

- The GSU's first library was located in the office of the Church Historian, 58 E. South Temple Street
- Church Administration Building, 47 E. South Temple Street (1917–1933)
- 80 N. Main Street (1934–1962)
- 100 S. Main Street (1962–1971)
- Church Office Building, 50 E. North Temple Street (1972–1985)
- 35 N. West Temple Street (1985–Present)

The current building, just west of Temple Square was opened on October 23, 1985, and cost $8.2 million.

In 1938, the GSU began to microfilm records which contained genealogical data from around the world, and today this microfilm makes up much of the library's collection. Today the GSU is more commonly known as FamilySearch, and in September 2021, completed digitizing many of its microfilm collections to be shared online. In 2017, the FHL opened a new center for interactive discovery experiences.

On January 10, 2023, the LDS Church announced a name change for the library. The former Family History Library would be known as the FamilySearch Library, and family history centers would be known as FamilySearch Centers (FSC).

=== 1999 shooting ===
At 10:30 a.m. on April 15, 1999, 70-year-old Sergei Babarin entered the library's lobby and began shooting. A security officer and one female patron were killed while several others were injured. One hour and 45 minutes after the shooting began, Salt Lake police shot and fatally wounded Babarin in an exchange of gunfire. The assailant discharged 20 bullets during his assault, and two police officers discharged four bullets, one of which struck the assailant in the head, who later died in an ambulance. The prosecutor ruled that the officers' shooting was justified, and they were not charged. Babarin's family indicated he had a history of schizophrenia, a claim not corroborated by the Valley Community Mental Health Clinic. This occurred only four months after a separate shooting incident a block away at the Triad Center.

The shooting occurred five days before the Columbine High School shooting in Columbine near Denver, Colorado.

== Purpose ==
FamilySearch's main purpose is to connect generations of family—past, present, and future—all over the world. The LDS Church believes that families, sealed together through saving ordinances in its temples, are eternal. Family members who die without the opportunity to perform these ordinances for themselves are able to receive them via proxy, which motivates the church's emphasis on family history work.

== Services ==
The FSL is located in Salt Lake City, Utah. It is the largest genealogical library in the world. The library holds genealogical records for over 100 countries, territories, and possessions. Its collections include over 1.3 million rolls of microfilmed records onsite and access the total collection of more than 2.4 million rolls of microfilmed genealogical records; 190,000 microfiche; 340,000 books, serials, and other formats; 125,000 periodicals; 3,725 electronic resources including subscriptions to the major genealogical websites.

The FSL offers research assistance to help patrons trace their own family history. Professional genealogists and volunteers offer assistance in about 30 languages, which includes reading and translating genealogically relevant documents. The FSL also offers free one-on-one consultations on difficult research problems. Additionally, there are classes on genealogical research topics free to the public and classes available online.

=== In-person services ===
- Photo, film, 35mm slide and book scanners to digitize family records.
- Recording booths to preserve your family stories and memories
- Activities, classes and workshops for people of all ages and skill levels
- Open access to thousands of record collections, publications and microfilms
- Children's area, which allows parents to do computer research and watch their children at the same time

=== Online services ===
- Online access to FamilySearch.org and other subscription genealogical websites
- Free online family history classes and webinars
- Free online genealogy consultations with FamilySearch Library experts

== Branches ==
Branches of the FSL are FamilySearch Centers. While there are over 6,600 FSCs operating in more than 149 countries there are only about 17 major regional branch library class facilities. The others are usually located in ward, branch, and stake facilities of the LDS Church with at least one or more genealogical computers.

== See also ==
- Family history
- Family History Research Wiki
- Genealogy
- Immigrant Ancestors Project
- List of Mormon family organizations
