= Cotopaxi (disambiguation) =

Cotopaxi is a volcano in Ecuador.

Cotopaxi may also refer to:

- Cotopaxi (painting), by Frederic Edwin Church
- "Cotopaxi" (song), by The Mars Volta
- Cotopaxi, Colorado, United States
- Cotopaxi Province, Ecuador
- SS Cotopaxi, an American tramp steamer
- Cotopaxi (company), a brand of outdoor recreation equipment
- Cotopaxi, Cotopaxi Cruiser, and Cotopaxi Steamer, earlier names of BAE Abdón Calderón, a naval ship of Ecuador
