= Rex E. Lee =

American lawyer (born 1935)

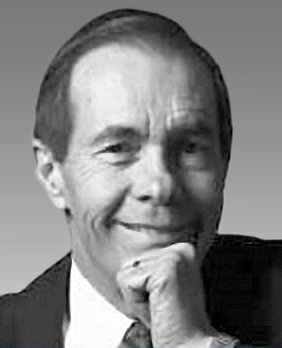

10th President of Brigham Young University
- In office July 1, 1989 – December 31, 1995
- Preceded by: Jeffrey R. Holland
- Succeeded by: Merrill J. Bateman

37th Solicitor General of the United States
- In office August 6, 1981 – June 1, 1985
- President: Ronald Reagan
- Preceded by: Wade H. McCree
- Succeeded by: Charles Fried

United States Assistant Attorney General for the Civil Division
- In office 1977–1977
- President: Gerald Ford
- Preceded by: Carla Anderson Hills
- Succeeded by: Barbara A. Babcock

Dean of the J. Reuben Clark Law School
- In office October 1980 – August 1981
- Preceded by: Position established
- Succeeded by: Carl S. Hawkins

Personal details
- Born: Rex Edwin Lee; February 27, 1935 St. Johns, Arizona, U.S.
- Died: March 11, 1996 (aged 61) Provo, Utah, U.S.
- Party: Republican
- Spouse: Janet Griffin
- Children: 7, including Mike and Thomas
- Education: Brigham Young University (BA); University of Chicago (JD)

Rex Edwin Lee (February 27, 1935 - March 11, 1996) was an American lawyer and academic who served as the 37th solicitor general of the United States from 1981 to 1985. He was responsible for bringing the solicitor general's office to the center of U.S. legal policymaking. During his tenure, Lee argued 59 cases before the U.S. Supreme Court.

A member of The Church of Jesus Christ of Latter-day Saints (LDS Church), Lee was an alumnus of Brigham Young University (BYU) and the University of Chicago Law School. Lee was the president of BYU from 1989 to 1995, and from 1971 to 1975 he was the inaugural dean of BYU's J. Reuben Clark Law School (JRCLS).

== Background and education ==
Lee was born in Los Angeles, California, on February 27, 1935. His parents were Mabel (née Whiting) and Rex E. Lee. According to an obituary in American Rifleman, Lee's father was shot and killed during a hunting trip in November 1934, three months before he was born, thus making him a posthumous child. His mother later married Wilford Shumway. Lee served a mission for the LDS Church in the Mexican Mission, serving as second counselor to the mission president. He first met his future wife, Janet Griffin (whose father was the Treasury Attaché of the US Embassy in Mexico City), while he was in Mexico. When Lee returned from his mission and enrolled at BYU, he became reacquainted with Janet, and they married on July 7, 1958, in Arizona. Lee and Griffin had seven children.

At BYU, Lee was elected student body president. After graduating in 1960, he attended the University of Chicago Law School, where he was an editor of the University of Chicago Law Review. He graduated from Chicago in 1963 ranked first in his class.

== Early legal career and academia ==
After law school, Lee served as a law clerk for U.S. Supreme Court justice Byron White from 1963 to 1964. He then entered private practice at the law firm of Jennings, Strouss & Salmon in Phoenix, Arizona. Only four years after graduating from law school, Lee argued his first case before the U.S. Supreme Court, despite the fact that he had not yet led any depositions in a lower civil court.

In 1972, Lee left private practice to become the founding dean of BYU's JRCLS, and is considered personally responsible for recruiting many members of its charter class.

== Supreme Court advocate and scholar ==
Lee entered public service, first at the invitation of Attorney General Edward H. Levi, as an Assistant Attorney General in charge of the Civil Division in the United States Department of Justice from 1975 to 1976. In 1980, Lee wrote A Lawyer Looks at the Equal Rights Amendment in which he analyzed arguments against the Equal Rights Amendment.

He served as Solicitor General of the United States from 1981 to 1985 under President of the United States Ronald Reagan. As Solicitor General, Lee argued cases before the Supreme Court. During his time as Solicitor General, Lee won 23 of the 30 cases he argued during Reagan's first presidential term. Before he died, he was preparing to argue his 60th case before the Supreme Court despite being confined to a hospital bed. Associate Justice White said that Lee "was the epitome of integrity". At one point, while being criticized for taking unpopular stances that might have been at odds with the administration under which he served, Lee responded: "I'm the solicitor general, not the pamphleteer general."

Lee relished the opportunity to argue before the Supreme Court. His son, Mike Lee, noted that Lee was very energetic and enthusiastic about arguing cases. In June 1985, Lee resigned as Solicitor General among criticism that he was not conservative enough. In 1986, Lee was diagnosed with pancreatic cancer. Lee managed to recover after about a year of cancer treatment and therapy and was named BYU's tenth president. According to some accounts, when Lee was asked to assume the position as university president, he accepted on the condition that he would still be able to argue cases before the Supreme Court in his spare time. He argued nine before his death.

== BYU presidency ==
As president of BYU, Lee oversaw the creation of clear standards on employment requirements and academic freedom, especially in terms of religious education. Lee believed that religious perspectives in the classroom promote academic freedom rather than hinder it. He also oversaw the streamlining of graduation requirements to aid students in graduating more quickly. Specifically, he limited major requirements to 60 credit hours, encouraging graduation within four years or eight semesters. Furthermore, he reinstated weekly university devotionals. His administration was responsible for growing the size of the campus and prestige of the university. In 1993, Lee decided BYU would offer lower tuition for summer semester to increase enrollment. While president, Lee instituted a rule that added regular church attendance as a requirement for attending BYU (though regular church attendance was not defined), stating that the rule would not be used to force church attendance but that those best fitted to BYU's environment would, "cheerfully participate in church activity".

In 1993 and 1994, controversy arose when two professors were terminated at BYU. Arguments arose with some claiming that they were fired due to their outspoken beliefs (one of which was supportive of the Pro-choice movement) that were not in line with the LDS Church, while administrators claimed it was strictly due to academic performance. These allegations sparked accusations of an "anti-feminist" BYU, which Lee denied, affirming that feminists were welcome on BYU campus. Lee also introduced "question and answer" sessions for faculty, students, and staff as well as additions to the physical plant of the university. Furthermore, he emphasized university devotional attendance and encouraged school spirit. In 1994, Lee created a committee to raise $250 million for the "Lighting the Way Capital Campaign" for the benefit of BYU and BYU-Hawaii to reach accreditation. The campaign was completed in December 1999, having earned over $400 million.

Before Lee's tenure as BYU president was over, he struggled with lymphoma and peripheral neuropathy. He served as BYU's president from July 1, 1989, to December 31, 1995. He died at age 61, less than three months after resigning as president of BYU. During Lee's funeral, BYU classes were canceled for two hours to allow students to attend the funeral.

== Legacy ==
During his career, Lee argued 59 cases before the Supreme Court. Future associate Supreme Court justice Samuel Alito served as an assistant to Solicitor General Lee from 1981 to 1985, where Alito argued 12 cases before the Court. According to scholar Rebecca Mae Salokar, Rex E. Lee brought the position of Solicitor General into the center of policymaking in the United States. In 1998, the JRCLS created the Rex E. Lee Chair to honor him.

Lee won one of the first Distinguished Utahn of the Year awards. Lee was an avid runner throughout his life (he was nominated to be Solicitor General two days after completing the Boston Marathon), and an annual race is held in his honor at BYU to raise proceeds for cancer research.

== Family ==
Lee and his wife had seven children. His son Thomas Rex Lee was a justice of the Utah Supreme Court from 2010 to 2022. Another son, Mike Lee, has served as a United States Senator from Utah since 2011. Lee was a first cousin of politicians Mo Udall and Stewart Udall.

== Works ==
- Lee, Rex E. (1980). A Lawyer Looks at the Constitution. Provo, Utah: Brigham Young University Press. ISBN 978-0842519045.
- Lee, Rex E. (1992). What do Mormons believe?. Salt Lake City, Utah: Deseret Book Company. ISBN 978-0875796390.
- Lee, Rex E. (1996). Marathon of Faith. Salt Lake City, Utah: Deseret Book Company. ISBN 978-1573451635.
- Lee, Rex E. (1980). A Lawyer looks at the equal rights amendment. Provo, Utah: Brigham Young University Press. ISBN 978-0842518833.

== See also ==
- List of law clerks for the sixth seat of the Supreme Court of the United States
- Immigration and Naturalization Service v. Chadha
- United States v. Leon
- Lee-Hamblin family

Academic offices
New office	Dean of the J. Reuben Clark Law School; 1971–1981	Succeeded by Carl S. Hawkins
Preceded by Jeffrey R. Holland	President of Brigham Young University; 1989–1995	Succeeded by Merrill J. Bateman
Legal offices
Preceded by Wade H. McCree	Solicitor General of the United States; 1981–1985	Succeeded by Charles Fried
