= Brigham Young University =

Private university in Provo, Utah, US

- Former name: Brigham Young Academy (1875–1903)
- Motto: No official motto Unofficial mottoes include: "The glory of God is intelligence"; "Enter to learn, go forth to serve"; "The world is our campus"
- Type: Private research university
- Established: October 16, 1875; 151 years ago
- Parent institution: Church Educational System
- Accreditation: NWCCU
- Religious affiliation: The Church of Jesus Christ of Latter-day Saints
- Academic affiliations: Space-grant
- Endowment: $3.71 billion (Fiscal year 2025)
- President: C. Shane Reese
- Faculty: 1,264 full-time, 486 part-time
- Administrative staff: 1,200 full-time, 900 part-time
- Students: 37,205 (fall 2025)
- Undergraduates: 34,224 (fall 2025)
- Postgraduates: 2,981 (fall 2025)
- Location: Provo, Utah, United States; 40°14′59″N 111°38′57″W
- Campus: 560 acres (2.3 km^{2}); Midsize city
- Other campuses: Jerusalem; Salt Lake City; Washington, D.C.; London
- Newspaper: The Universe
- Colors: Navy and white
- Nickname: Cougars
- Sporting affiliations: NCAA Division I FBS – Big 12; MPSF
- Mascot: Cosmo the Cougar
- Website: byu.edu

Brigham Young University (BYU) is a private research university in Provo, Utah, United States. Owned and operated by the Church of Jesus Christ of Latter-day Saints (LDS Church), the university was founded in 1875 by church president Brigham Young and is the largest university of the Church Educational System (CES).

BYU offers a variety of academic programs including those in the liberal arts, engineering, agriculture, management, physical and mathematical sciences, nursing, music, and law. Its undergraduate and graduate programs are organized into 11 colleges and schools at its main Provo campus, with some colleges and divisions defining their own admission standards. The university also administers four satellite campuses in Jerusalem, Salt Lake City, Washington, D.C., and London, while its parent organization, CES, sponsors sister schools in Hawaii and Idaho. The university is accredited by the Northwest Commission on Colleges and Universities and is classified among "R1: Doctoral Universities – Very high research spending and doctorate production".

Almost all BYU students are members of the LDS Church. Students attending BYU agree to follow an honor code, which mandates behavior in line with teachings of the church, such as academic honesty, adherence to dress and grooming standards and abstinence from extramarital sex, same-sex romantic behavior, and consumption of alcohol and other drugs. Undergraduate students are also required to complete curriculum in LDS religious education for graduation regardless of their course of study. Due in part to the church's emphasis on missionary service, nearly 50% of BYU students have lived outside the United States, 65% speak a second language, and 63 languages are taught at the university regularly.

BYU's athletic teams compete in Division I of the NCAA and are collectively known as the BYU Cougars. All sports teams compete in the Big 12 Conference except for men's volleyball which is a member of the Mountain Pacific Sports Federation. BYU's sports teams have won a total of 14 NCAA championships and 26 non-NCAA championships.

== History ==
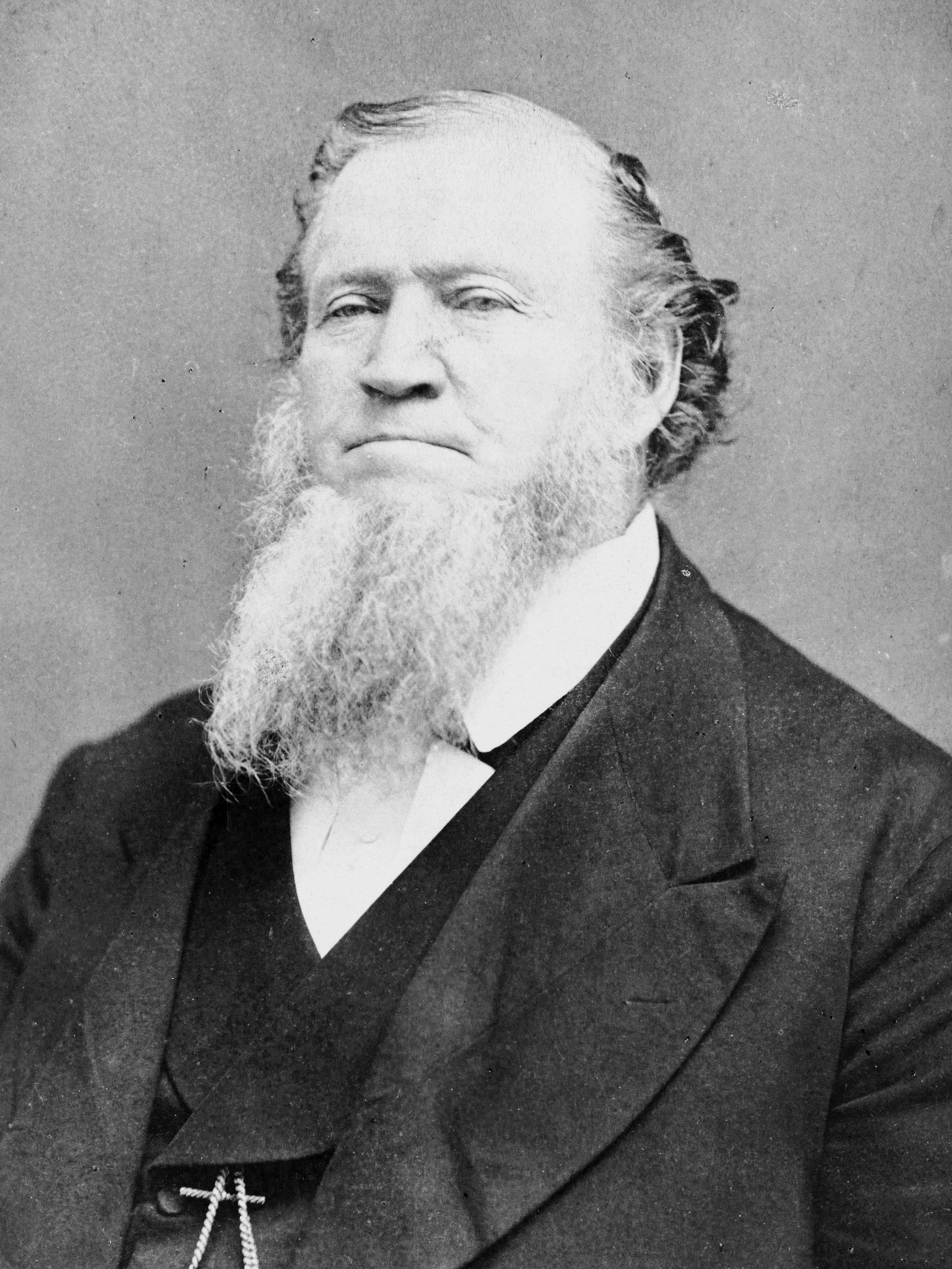
Brigham Young, the school's eponym

=== Early days ===
The origin of BYU can be traced back to 1862, when Warren Dusenberry started a Provo school in Cluff Hall, a prominent adobe building in the northeast corner of 200 East and 200 North. After some financial difficulties, the school was recreated in the Kinsey and Lewis buildings on Center Street in Provo, and after gaining some recognition for its quality, was adopted to become the Timpanogos branch of the University of Deseret. When financial difficulty forced another closure, on October 16, 1875, Brigham Young, then president of the LDS Church, deeded the property to trustees to create Brigham Young Academy after earlier hinting a school would be built in Draper, Utah, in 1867. Hence, October 16, 1875, is commonly held as BYU's founding date. Young had been envisioning for several years the concept of a church university. Said Young about his vision: "I hope to see an Academy established in Provo ... at which the children of the Latter-day Saints can receive a good education unmixed with the pernicious atheistic influences that are found in so many of the higher schools of the country."

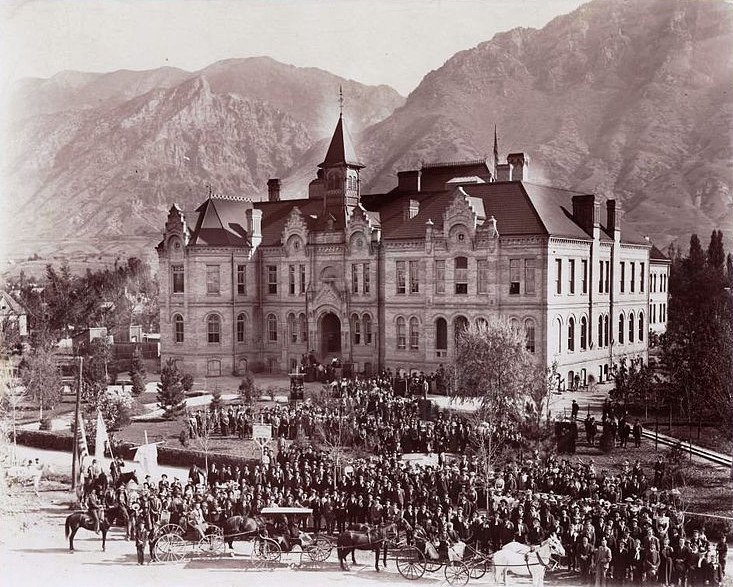
The Brigham Young Academy building c. 1900

Classes at Brigham Young Academy commenced on January 3, 1876. Dusenberry served as interim principal for several months until April 1876, when Brigham Young's choice for principal arrived—a Saxon immigrant named Karl Maeser. During this period the future U.S. Supreme Court Justice George Sutherland and future U.S. Senator Reed Smoot attended. The school did not become a university until the end of Benjamin Cluff's term as president in 1903. At that time, the school was still privately supported by members of the community and was not absorbed and sponsored officially by the church until July 18, 1896. A series of odd managerial decisions by Cluff led to his demotion. Still, his last official act was to propose to the board that the academy be named "Brigham Young University". Many opposed, saying the school was not large enough to be a university, but the decision ultimately passed.

In 1903, Brigham Young Academy was dissolved and replaced by two institutions, Brigham Young High School (BY High) and BYU. The BY High class of 1907 was ultimately responsible for the giant "Y" that remains embedded on a mountain near campus. The Board elected George H. Brimhall as the new President of BYU. Under his tenure in 1904, the new BYU bought 17 acres (69,000 m^{2}) of land from Provo called "Temple Hill". After some controversy among locals over BYU's purchase of this property, construction began in 1909 on the first building on the current campus, the Karl G. Maeser Memorial. Brimhall also presided over BYU during a brief crisis involving the theory of evolution. The religious nature of the school seemed at the time to collide with this scientific theory. Joseph F. Smith, church president at the time, settled the question for a time by asking that evolution not be taught at the school. Over time, students and faculty found a way to reconcile the factual elements of evolution with the church's teachings. Even though a few at this time described the school as little more than a "religious seminary", many of its graduates from this time would go on to great success and become well renowned in a variety of fields.

=== Expansion ===
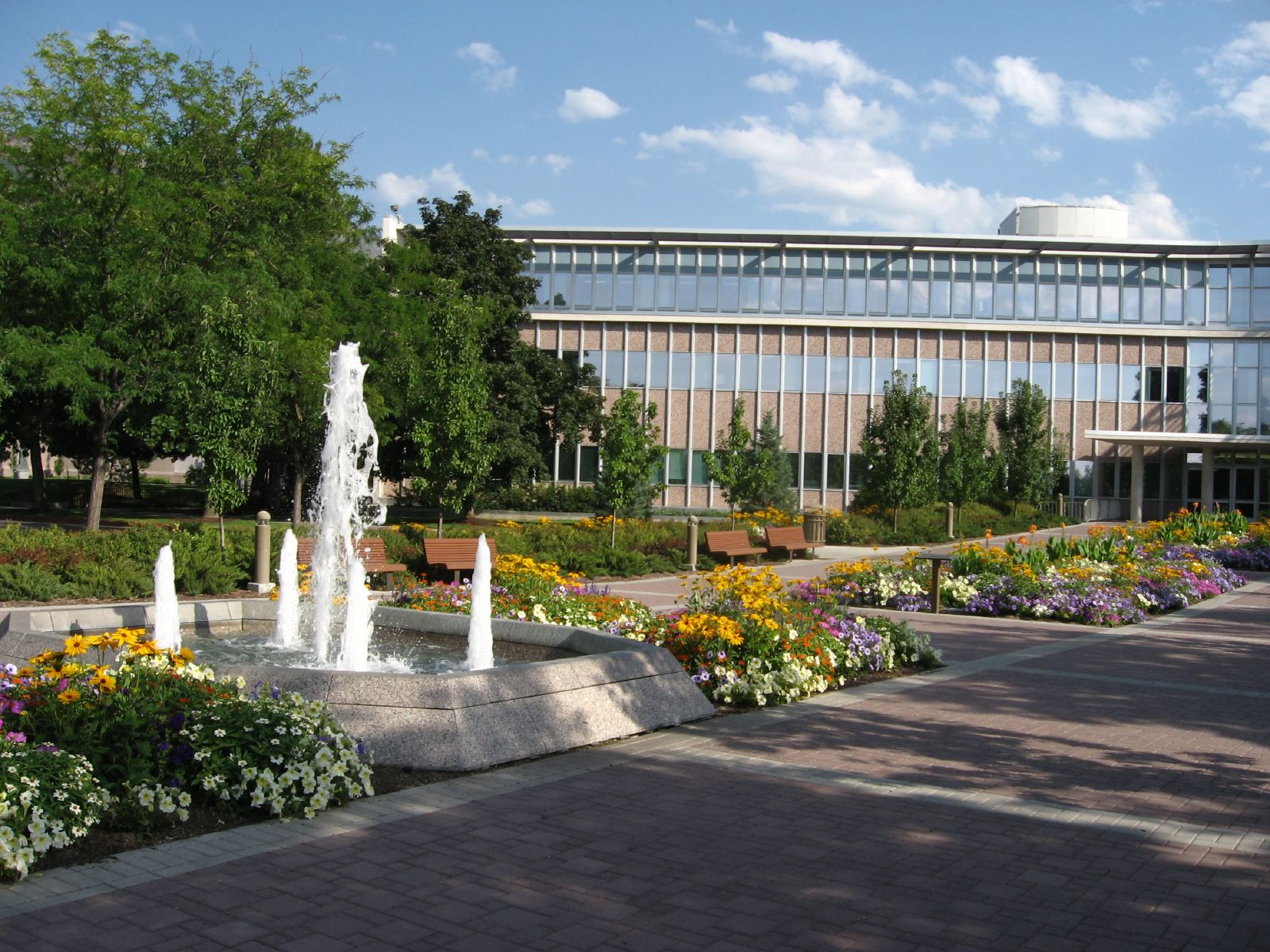
The Abraham O. Smoot Administration Building

In 1921, Franklin S. Harris was appointed as BYU's president and was the first in this role to have a doctoral degree. Harris made several significant changes to the school, reorganizing it into a true university, whereas before, its organization had remnants of the academy days. At the beginning of his tenure, the school was not officially recognized as a university by any accreditation organization. By the end of his term, the school was accredited by all major accrediting organizations at the time. He was succeeded by Howard S. McDonald, who received a doctorate from the University of California. When he first received the position, the Second World War had just ended, and thousands of students were flooding into BYU. By the end of his stay, the school had grown nearly five times to 5,440 students. BYU did not have the facilities to handle such a large influx, so he bought part of an Air Force Base in Ogden, Utah, and rebuilt it to house some of the students. The next president, Ernest L. Wilkinson, also oversaw a period of intense growth as the school adopted an accelerated building program. Wilkinson was responsible for the building of over eighty structures on the campus, many of which still stand. During his tenure, the student body increased six-fold, making BYU the largest private school at the time. The quality of the students also increased, leading to higher educational standards at the school. Finally, Wilkinson reorganized LDS Church units on campus, with ten stakes and over 100 wards added during his administration.

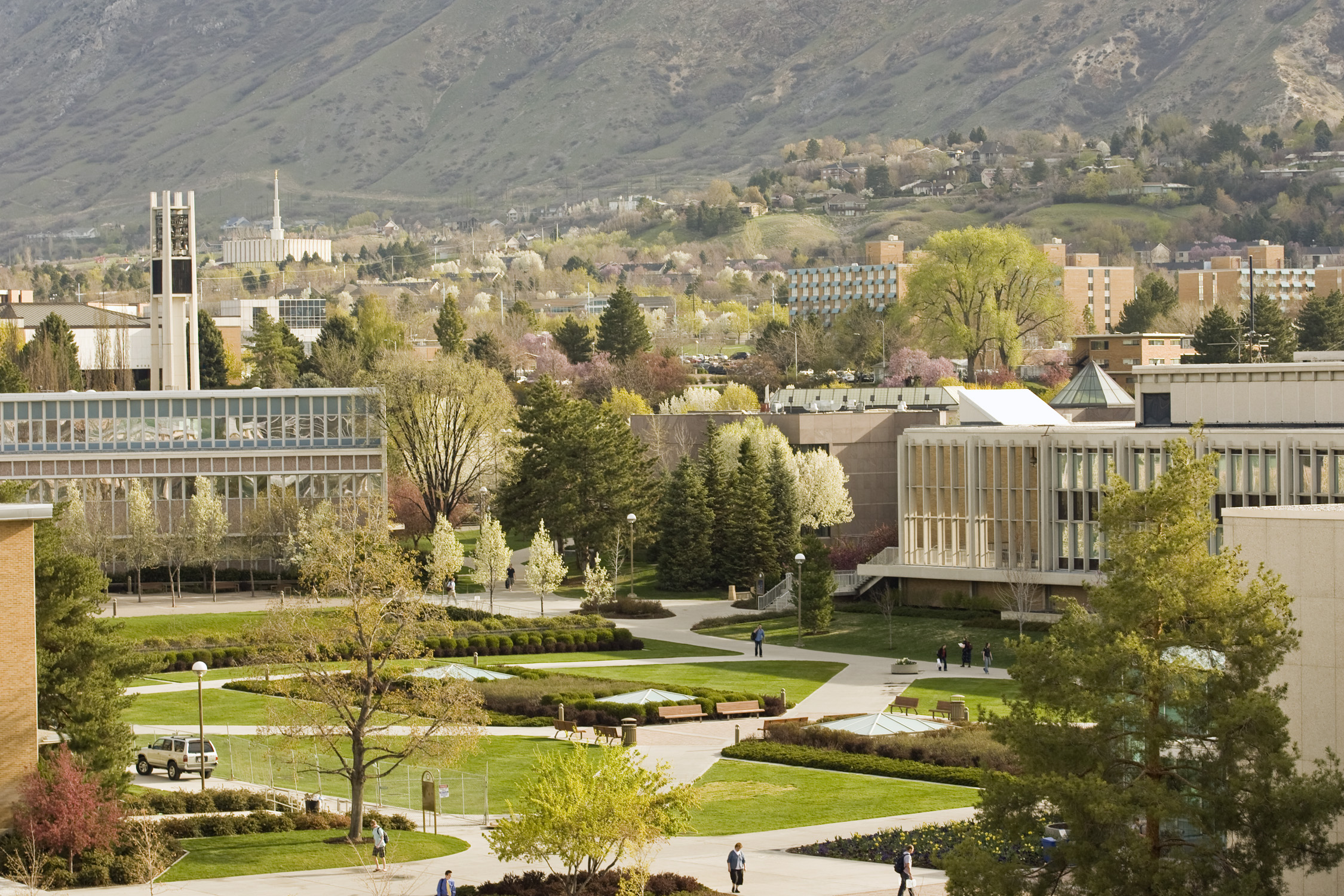
Overlooking North Campus

Dallin H. Oaks replaced Wilkinson as president in 1971. Oaks continued the expansion of his predecessor, adding a law school and proposing plans for a new School of Management. During his administration, a new library was also added, doubling the library space on campus. Jeffrey R. Holland followed as president in 1980, encouraging a combination of educational excellence and religious faith. He believed one of the school's greatest strengths was its religious nature and that this should be taken advantage of, rather than hidden. During his administration, BYU added a campus in Jerusalem, now called the BYU Jerusalem Center. In 1989, Holland was replaced by Rex E. Lee, who was responsible for the construction of the Benson Science Building and the Museum of Art; shortly before his death from cancer, he resigned and was replaced in 1995 by Merrill J. Bateman. Lee is memorialized annually at BYU during a cancer fundraiser called the Rex Lee Run.

Bateman was responsible for the construction of 36 new buildings for BYU, both on and off the campus, including the expansion of the Harold B. Lee Library. He was also one of several key college leaders who brought about the creation of the Mountain West Conference, which BYU's athletics program joined — BYU previously participated in the Western Athletic Conference. A satellite TV network also opened in 2000 under his leadership. Bateman was followed by Cecil O. Samuelson in 2003. Samuelson was succeeded by Kevin J Worthen in 2014. C. Shane Reese became BYU's 14th president on May 1, 2023. On July 29, 2024, the First Presidency of the Church of Jesus Christ of Latter-day Saints announced plans to create a medical school for the university.

In 2025, the university was declared an undesirable organization in Russia.

== Campus ==
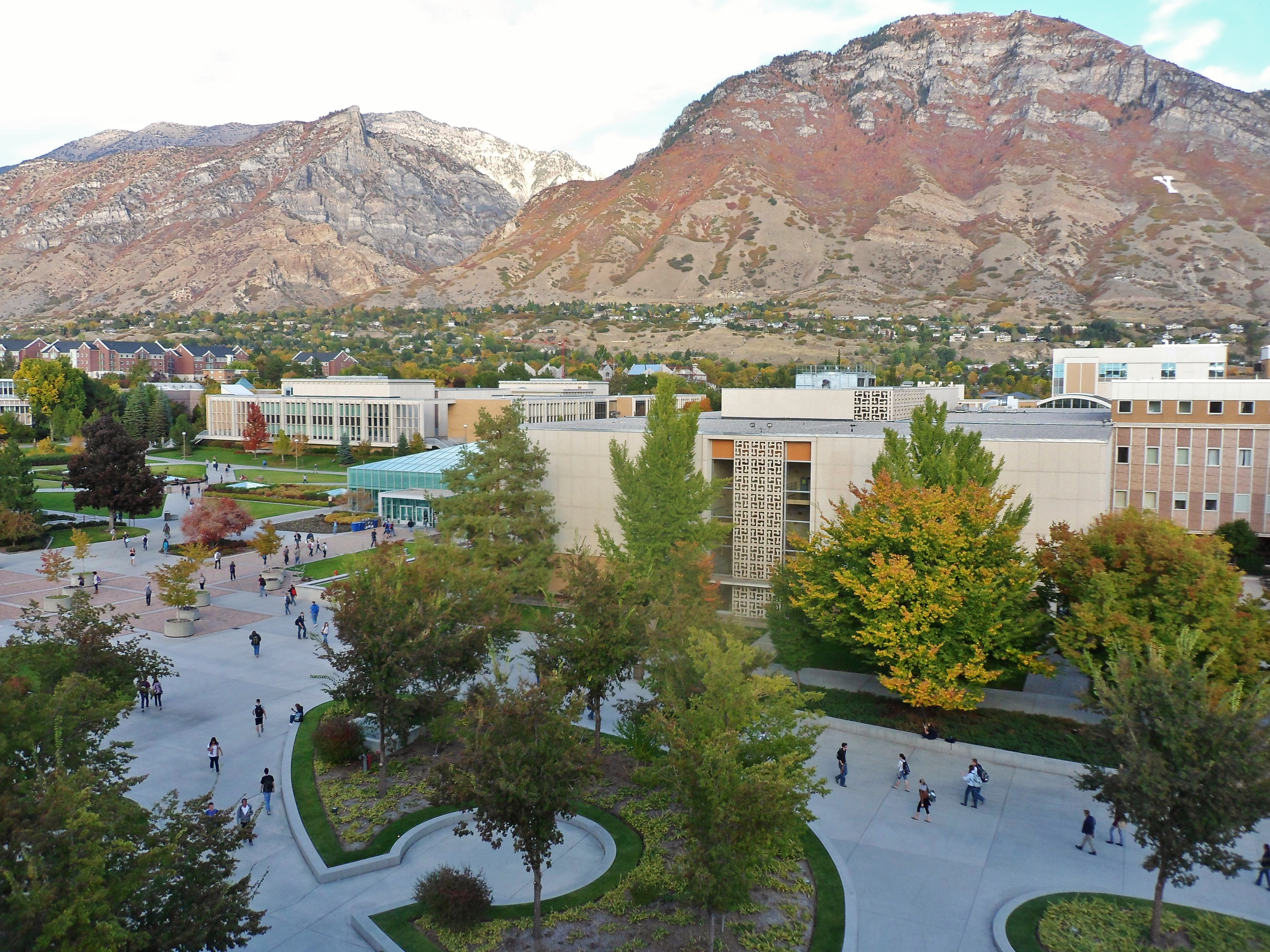
BYU campus with Y mountain and Kyhv Peak (formerly called Squaw Peak) in the background

The main campus in Provo, Utah, sits on approximately 560 acres (2.3 km^{2}) nestled at the base of the Wasatch Mountains and includes 295 buildings. The buildings feature a wide variety of architectural styles, each building being built in the style of its time. Views of the Wasatch Mountains, (including Mount Timpanogos) can be seen from the campus. BYU's Harold B. Lee Library (also known as "HBLL"), which The Princeton Review ranked as the No. 1 "Great College Library" in 2004, has approximately 8.5 million items in its collections, contains 98 miles (158 km) of shelving, and can seat 4,600 people. The Spencer W. Kimball Tower is home to several of the university's departments and programs and for a long time was the tallest building in Provo, Utah, and the Marriott Center serves primarily as a basketball arena and can seat over 19,000, making it the tenth largest on-campus arena in the nation. On Sundays, nearly all of the buildings on campus are utilized to host church services.

=== Museums ===
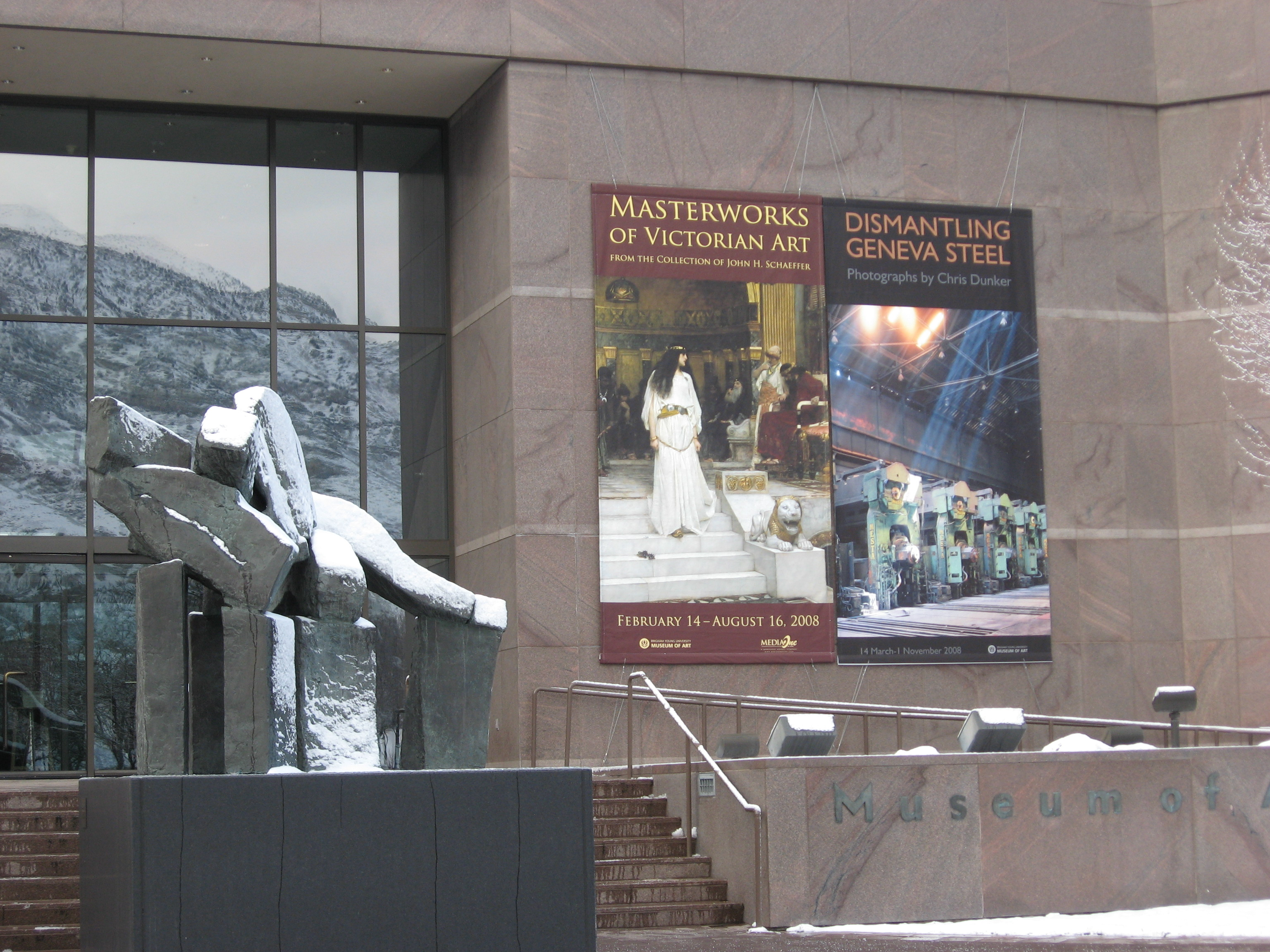
Museum of Art north entrance

Several museums on campus contain exhibits from many different fields of study. BYU's Museum of Art, for example, is one of the largest and most attended art museums in the Mountain West. This museum offers research and study opportunities to students and educational programming to the general public. The Museum of Peoples and Cultures is a museum of archaeology and ethnology. It focuses on native cultures and artifacts of the Great Basin, American Southwest, Mesoamerica, Peru, and Polynesia. Home to more than 40,000 artifacts and 50,000 photographs, it documents BYU's archaeological research. The BYU Museum of Paleontology was built in 1976 to display the many fossils found by BYU's James A. Jensen. It holds many vertebrate fossils from the Jurassic and Cretaceous periods and is one of the top five vertebrate fossil collections in the world from the Jurassic. The museum receives about 25,000 visitors every year. The Monte L. Bean Life Science Museum was formed in 1978. It features several forms of plant and animal life on display and available for research by students and scholars.

=== Performing arts ===
The campus also houses several performing arts facilities. From 1964 to 2023, the Harris Fine Arts Center (HFAC) was the primary building for all fine arts and performing arts on campus. To replace the HFAC, the Music Building opened in winter 2023, and the Arts Building opened in fall 2026. The Music Building features a vineyard-style concert hall which seats around 1000 people, in addition to a 250-seat recital hall for smaller performances. The Arts Building's mainstage theater seats around 800 people. It also contains smaller Studio and Black Box Theaters.

=== Student housing ===
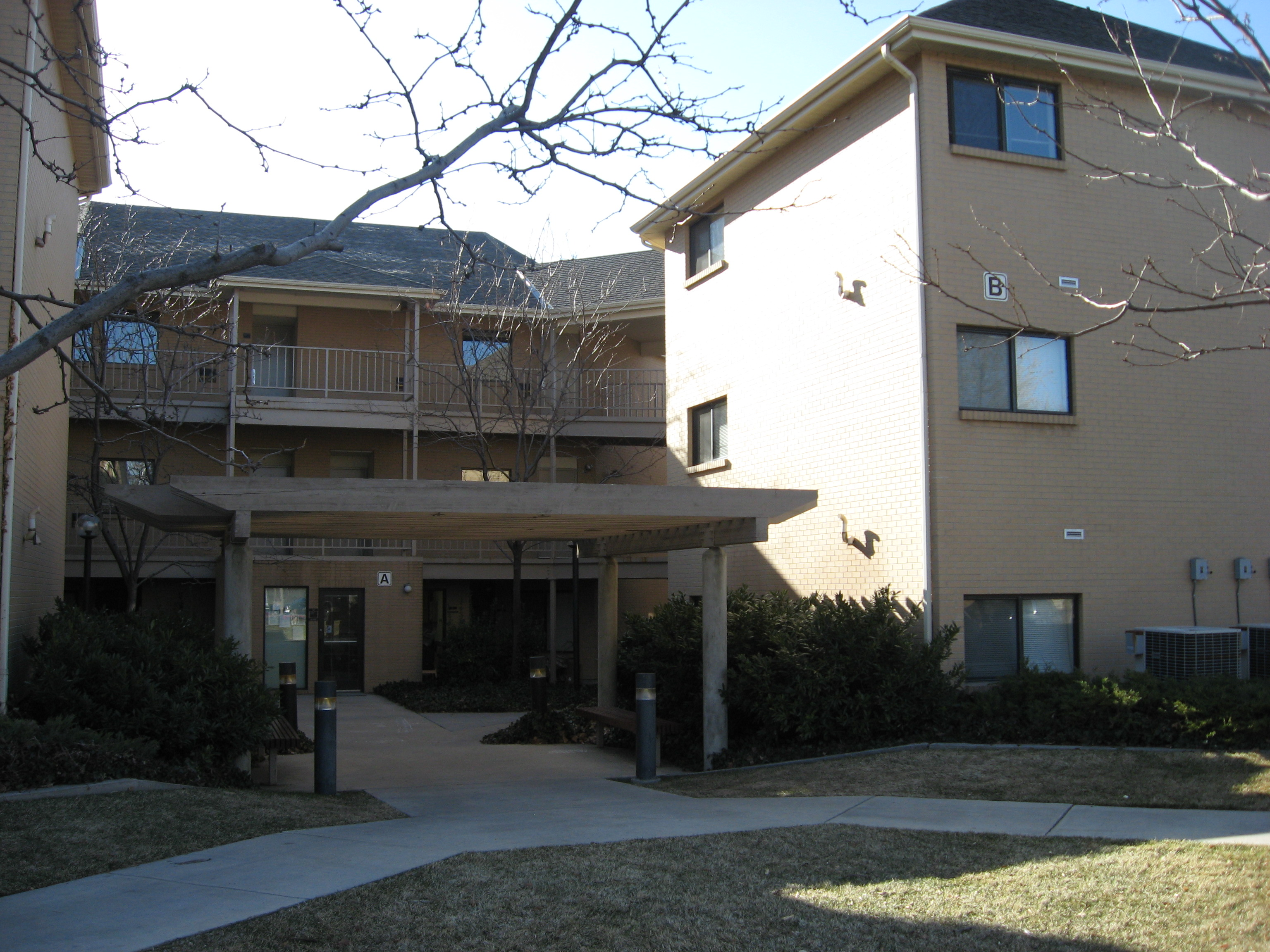
Foreign Language Student Residence, where students commit to speak only their language of study

BYU has on-campus housing communities for freshmen students as well as for students 19 years and older. Single students who are freshmen have four options for on-campus housing: Heritage Halls, Helaman Halls, Riviera Apartments, and the Foreign Language Student Residence (FLSR). On-campus housing for single students 19 years old and older is available at Wyview Park, Heritage Halls, and in the Foreign Language Student Residence Halls. On-campus married students live in Wymount Terrace or Wyview Park.

=== BYU Creamery ===
The creamery began in 1949 to provide milk for the campus, and soon thereafter it expanded its product line to include various dairy products. It has become a BYU tradition and is also frequented by visitors to the university. It was the first on-campus full-service grocery store in the country.

According to the BYU Dining Services statistics, more than 191,000 gallons of Creamery ice cream are served each year. In 2018, in celebration of being named most "Stone Cold Sober" school for twenty-one straight years by The Princeton Review, BYU Creamery released a new flavor of milk, mint brownie chocolate milk.

=== Sustainability ===
BYU has designated energy conservation, products and materials, recycling, site planning and building design, student involvement, transportation, water conservation, and zero waste events as top priority categories. The university has stated "we have a responsibility to be wise stewards of the earth and its resources." BYU is working to increase the energy efficiency of its buildings by installing various speed drives on all pumps and fans, replacing incandescent lighting with fluorescent lighting, retrofitting campus buildings with low-E reflective glass, and upgraded roof insulation to prevent heat loss. BYU Recycles spearheaded the recent campaign to begin recycling plastics, which the university did after a year of student campaigning.

== Organization and administration ==
Academic Schools and Colleges:
Name	Year founded
Business (Marriott)	1891
Education (McKay)	1913
Engineering (Fulton)	1953
Family, Home, and Social Sciences	1969
Fine Arts and Communications	1925
Humanities	1965
Law (Clark)	1973
Life Sciences	1954
Medicine	TBD
Nursing	1953
Computational, Mathematical, and Physical Sciences	1949
Religious Education	1959

BYU is a part of the Church Educational System (CES). It is organized under a board of trustees, with the president of the church (currently Dallin H. Oaks) as chairman. This board consists of the same people as the Church Board of Education, a pattern that has been in place since 1939. Prior to 1939, BYU had a separate board of trustees that was subordinate to the Church Board of Education. The president of BYU, currently C. Shane Reese, reports to the Board, through the Commissioner of Education.

The university operates under 11 colleges or schools, which collectively offer 194 bachelor's degree programs, 68 master's degree programs, 25 PhD programs, and a Juris Doctor program. BYU also manages some courses and majors through the David M. Kennedy Center for International Studies and "miscellaneous" college departments, including Undergraduate Education, Graduate Studies, Independent Study, Continuing Education, and the Honors Program. BYU's winter semester ends earlier than most universities in April since there is no Spring break, thus allowing students to pursue internships and other summer activities earlier.

== Academics ==
=== Admissions and demographics ===
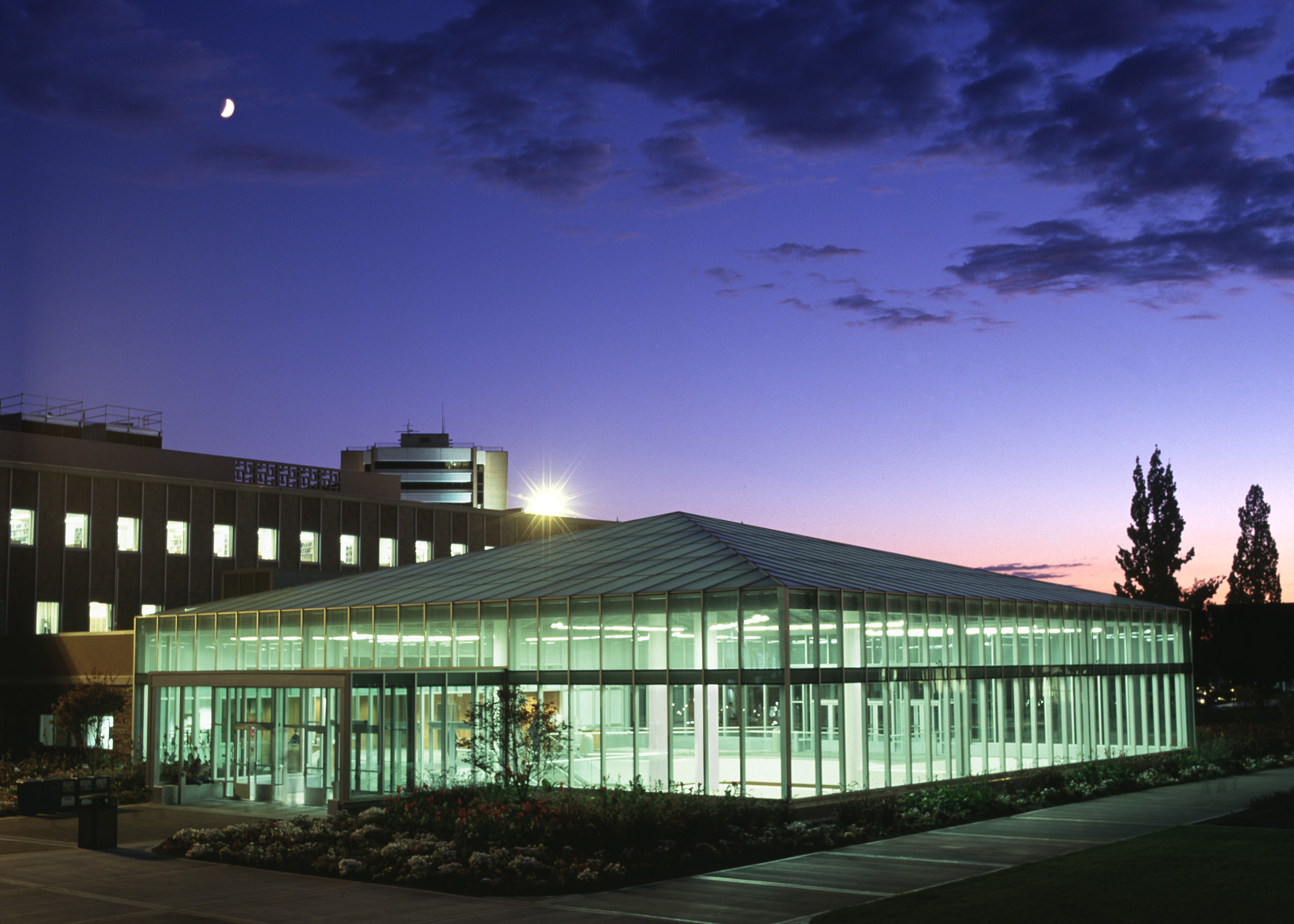
The Harold B. Lee Library is consistently ranked among the top ten in the nation, with a No. 1 ranking in 2004 by The Princeton Review.

Of the 14,067 freshman students that applied, BYU accepted 70.2% of them. The average GPA for these admitted students was 3.86 with an average ACT of 29.5 and SAT of 1300. In 2004, a National Bureau of Economic Research study on revealed preference of U.S. colleges showed BYU was the sixth-most-preferred choice among students from the Intermountain West, between Princeton and Brown. Students from every state in the U.S. and from many foreign countries attend BYU. (In the 2005–06 academic year, there were 2,396 foreign students, or eight percent of enrollment.) Slightly more than 98 percent of these students are active Latter-day Saints. In 2006, 12.6 percent of the student body reported themselves as ethnic minorities, mostly Asians, Pacific Islanders and Hispanics. In 2025, the racial breakdown of students was 80.6% white, 9.3% Hispanic or Latino, 4.5% multi-ethnic, 3% Asian, 1% Black, 1% native Hawaiian, and less than 1% American Indian. The racial composition of students at BYU is mostly non-Hispanic white, and BYU is considered one of the least diverse of the top 100 universities in the United States.

=== Rankings ===
Academic rankings

National
- Forbes: 40
- U.S. News & World Report: 116 (tie)
- Washington Monthly: 22
- WSJ/College Pulse: 63

Global
- ARWU: 701–800
- QS: 1,001–1,200
- U.S. News & World Report: 817 (tie)

U.S. News & World Report ranked BYU No. 116 (tie) in National Universities in 2026.

For 2025, the university's School of Accountancy, which is housed within the Marriott School of Business, received a No. 4 (tie) ranking out of 44 graduate programs rated by U.S. News & World Report.

The BYU J. Reuben Clark Law School has a No. 24 (tie) national ranking for 2026, according to U.S. News & World Report.

=== Graduation honors ===
Undergraduate students may qualify for graduation honors. University Honors is the highest distinction BYU awards its graduates. Administered by the Honors Program, the distinction requires students to complete an honors curriculum requirement, a Great Questions requirement, an Experiential Learning requirement, an honors thesis requirement, and a graduation portfolio that summarizes the student's honors experiences.

The university also awards Latin scholastic distinctions separately from the Honors Program: summa cum laude (top 1 percent), magna cum laude (top 5 percent), and cum laude (top 10 percent). The university additionally recognizes Phi Kappa Phi graduation honors.

=== Notable research and awards ===
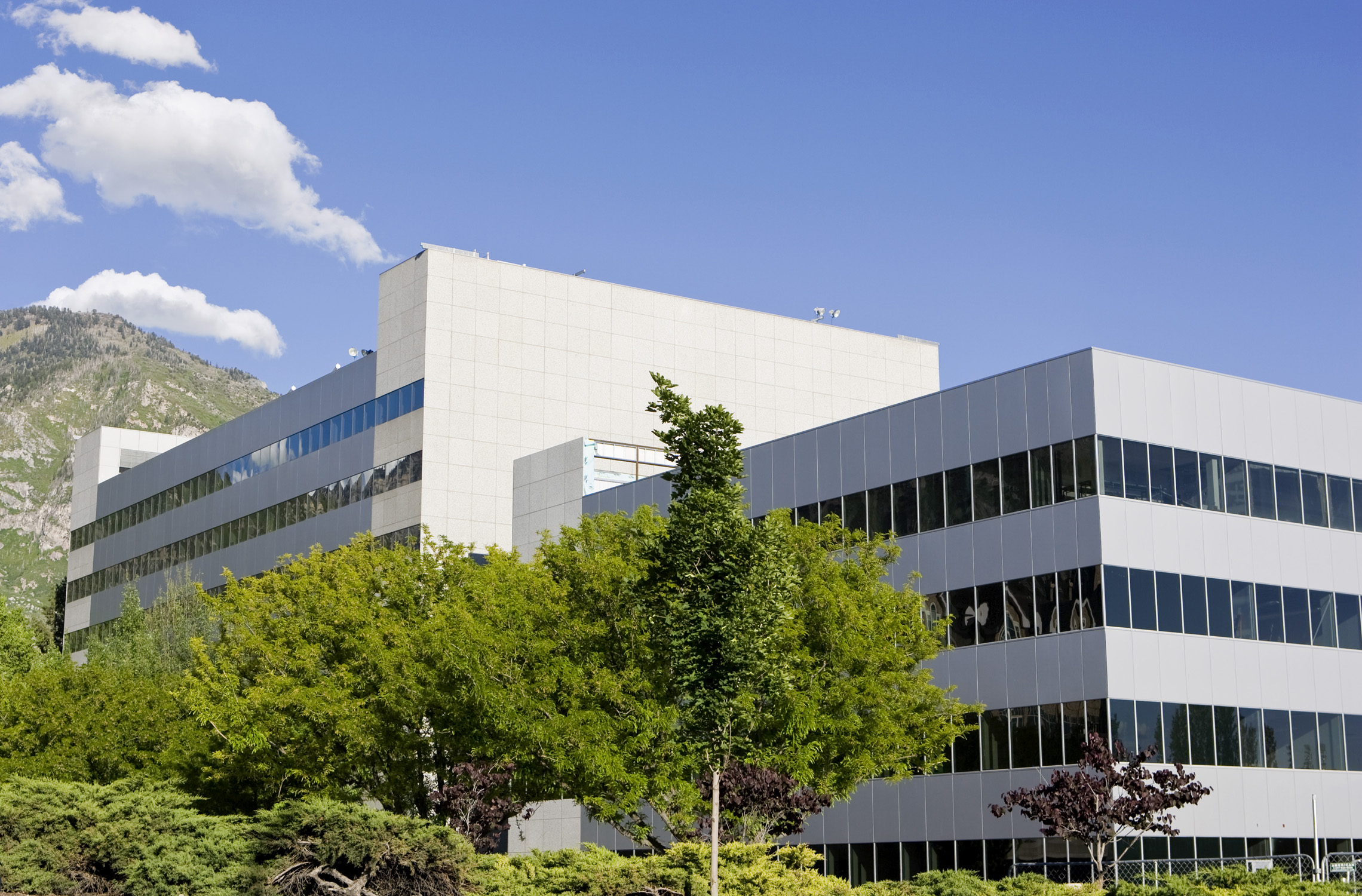
The N. Eldon Tanner Building, home of the Marriott School of Management

BYU is classified as "Research 1: Very High Research Spending And Doctorate Production," the highest Carnegie classification. According to the National Science Foundation, BYU spent $137.7 million on research and development in 2023, ranking it 162nd in the nation for research revenue and expenditures. Scientists associated with BYU have created some notable inventions. Philo T. Farnsworth, inventor and pioneer of the electronic television, began college at BYU, and later returned to do fusion research, receiving an honorary degree from the university in 1967. Alumnus Harvey Fletcher, inventor of stereophonic sound, went on to carry out the now famous oil-drop experiment with Robert Millikan, and was later Founding Dean of the BYU College of Engineering. H. Tracy Hall, inventor of the man-made diamond, left General Electric in 1955 and became a full professor of chemistry and Director of Research at BYU. While there, he invented a new type of diamond press, the tetrahedral press. In student achievements, BYU Ad Lab teams won both the 2007 and 2008 L'Oréal National Brandstorm Competition, and students developed the Magnetic Lasso algorithm found in Adobe Photoshop. In prestigious scholarships, BYU has produced 10 Rhodes Scholars, four Gates Scholars in the last six years, and in the last decade has claimed 41 Fulbright scholars and 3 Jack Kent Cooke scholars.

=== Businesses and entrepreneurship ===
BYU is one of the most highly ranked universities in entrepreneurship, with both the undergraduate and graduate programs being recognized as among the top 10 in the nation by The Princeton Review. The university is described as having a strong entrepreneurship culture in which students are encouraged to launch their own companies, attracting over $1.3 billion in venture capital funding as of 2018. Several companies founded by BYU alumni have been incredibly successful, with BYU leading the nation with it taking 6 years on average after college graduation for founders to achieve unicorn status for their startups. The area north of BYU is now known as the Silicon Slopes, a hub for tech employment and startup formation. Some notable companies founded by BYU alumni include 1-800 Contacts, Ancestry.com, Cotopaxi, Domo, Novell, Nu Skin Enterprises, Qualtrics, Pluralsight, The Trade Desk, and Vivint.

=== International focus ===
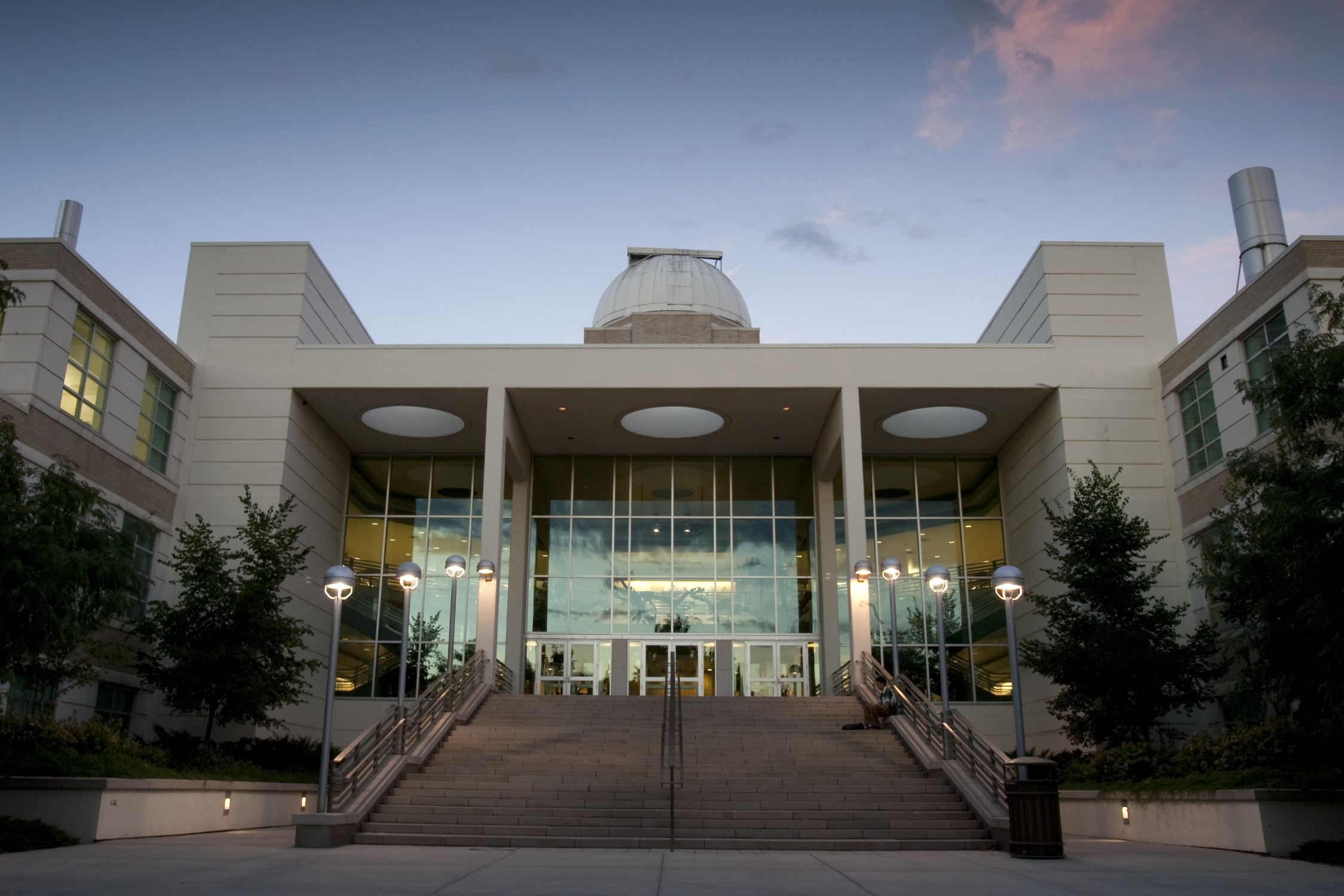
The Eyring Science Center houses a planetarium, an anechoic chamber and a Foucault pendulum.

Over three-quarters of the student body has some proficiency in a second language (numbering 107 languages in total). This is partly because 45 percent of the student body at BYU have been Latter-day Saint missionaries, and many of them learned a foreign language as part of their mission assignment. During any given semester, about one-third of the student body is enrolled in foreign language classes, a rate nearly four times the national average. BYU offers courses in over 60 different languages. Several of its language programs are the largest of their type in the nation, such as the Russian program. The university was selected by the United States Department of Education as the location of the national Middle East Language Resource Center, making the school a hub for experts on that region. It was also selected as a Center for International Business Education Research.

BYU runs a very large study abroad program, with satellite centers in London, Jerusalem, and Paris, as well as more than 20 other sites. Nearly 2,000 students take advantage of these programs yearly. In 2001, the Institute of International Education ranked BYU as the number one university in the U.S. to offer students study abroad opportunities. The BYU Jerusalem Center, which was closed in 2000 due to student security concerns related to the Second Intifada and later the 2006 Israel-Lebanon conflict, was reopened to students in the winter 2007 semester.

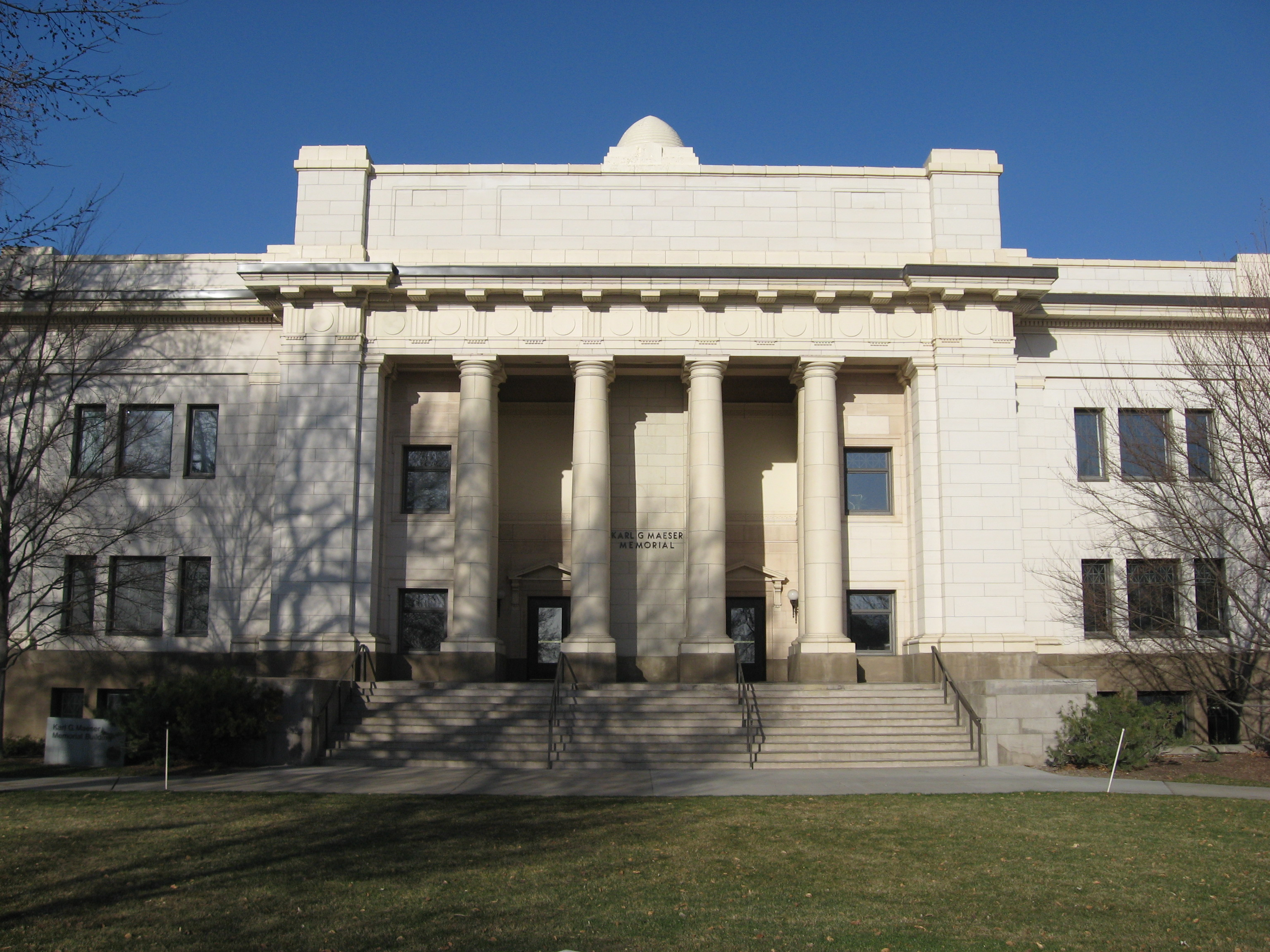
The Maeser Building, built in 1911, houses BYU's Honors Program.

=== Academic freedom issues ===
In 1992, the university drafted a new Statement on Academic Freedom, specifying that limitations may be placed upon "expression with students or in public that: (1) contradicts or opposes, rather than analyzes or discusses, fundamental Latter-day Saint doctrine or policy; (2) deliberately attacks or derides the church or its general leaders; or (3) violates the Honor Code because the expression is dishonest, illegal, unchaste, profane, or unduly disrespectful of others." These restrictions caused some controversy as several professors had been disciplined according to the then-new rule. The American Association of University Professors (AAUP) had claimed that "infringements on academic freedom are distressingly common and that the climate for academic freedom is distressingly poor." The newer rules have not affected BYU's accreditation, as the university's chosen accrediting body allows "religious colleges and universities to place limitations on academic freedom so long as they publish those limitations candidly", according to associate academic vice president Jim Gordon. The AAUP's concern was not with restrictions on the faculty member's religious expression but with a failure, as alleged by the faculty member and AAUP, that the restrictions had not been adequately specified in advance by BYU: "The AAUP requires that any doctrinal limitations on academic freedom be laid out clearly in writing. We [AAUP] concluded that BYU had failed to do so adequately."

In 2021, The Salt Lake Tribune noted the tension between faith and scholarship that has existed at the university as early as 1910, and how the recent LDS Church calls for a retrenchment has some BYU professors worried about a new wave of fideism at the university. According to a third-party survey that allowed faculty to answer anonymously, more than 90 percent of BYU faculty said they were satisfied or very satisfied with their jobs.

== Performing arts ==
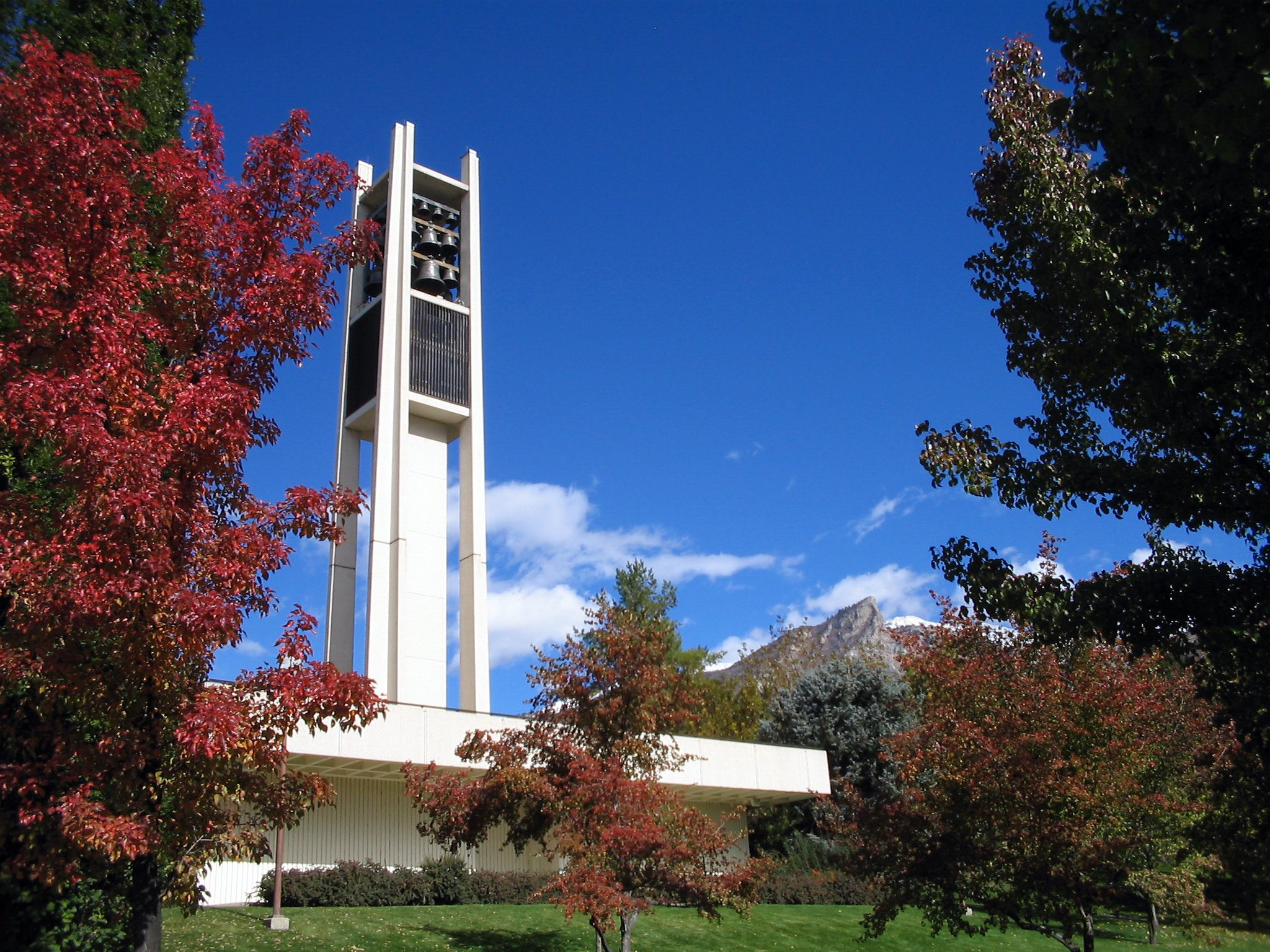
The BYU Centennial Carillon stands at the north end of campus.

=== Dance ===
The BYU Ballroom Dance Company is known as one of the best formation ballroom dance teams in the world, having won the U.S. National Formation Dance Championship every year since 1982. BYU's ballroom dance team has won first place in Latin or Standard (or both) many times when they have competed at the Blackpool Dance Festival, and they were the first U.S. team to win the formation championships at the famed British Championships in Blackpool, England in 1972. The NDCA National DanceSport championships have been held at BYU for several years, and BYU holds dozens of ballroom dance classes each semester and has consequently the largest collegiate ballroom dance program in the world.

=== Music ===
The Young Ambassadors are a song and dance performing group with a 50-year history at BYU. Prior to 1970 the group was known as Curtain Time USA. In the 1960s their world tour stops included Lebanon, Jordan, and Iraq. The group first performed as the Young Ambassadors at Expo '70 in Japan, and has since performed in over 56 nations. The royalty of Thailand and Jordan, along with persons of high office in countries such as India, have been among their audiences.

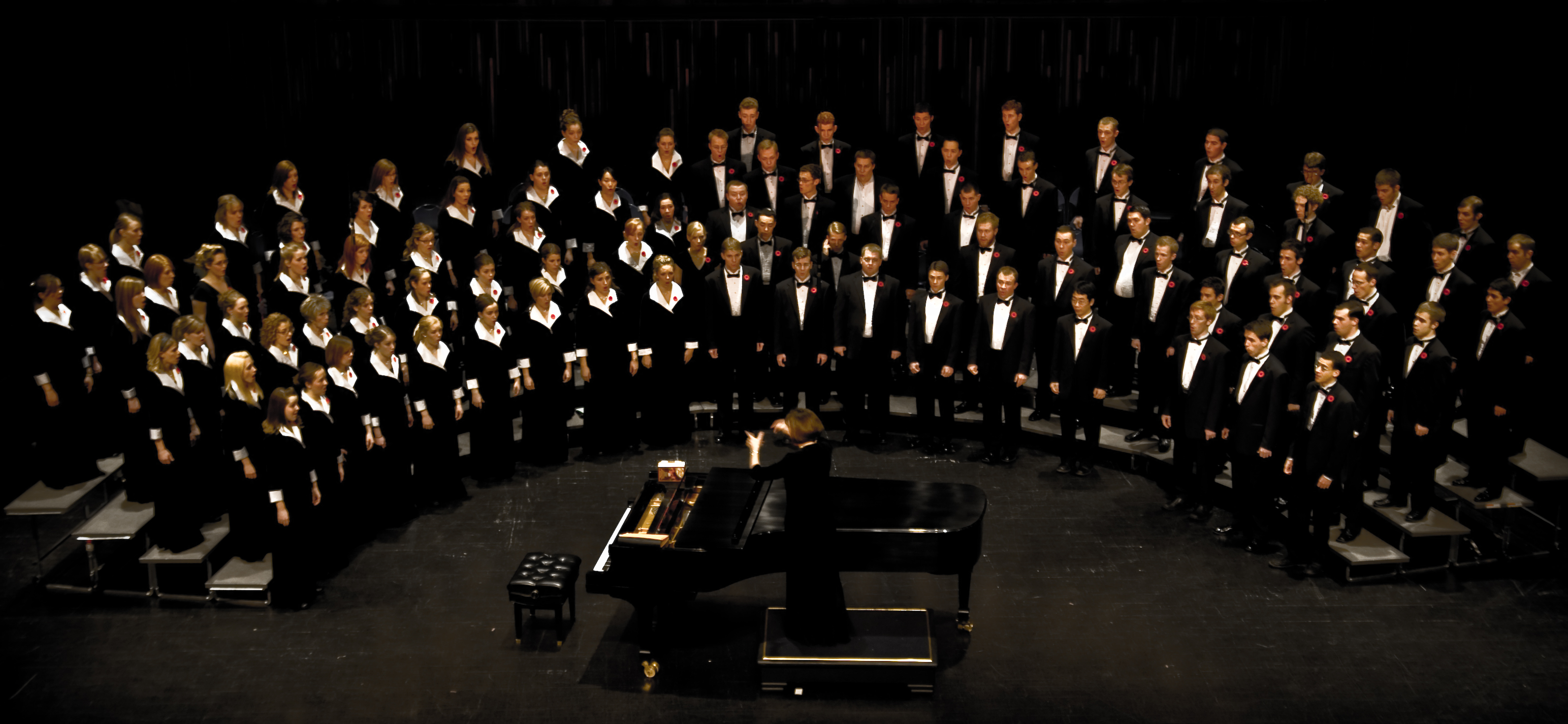
The Concert Choir in performance

The BYU Opera Workshop gave the first North American performance of the Ralph Vaughan Williams opera The Pilgrim's Progress on April 28, 1969, directed by Max C. Golightly.

BYU has three concert bands, seven orchestras, and three jazz bands. BYU's touring instrumental ensembles include the Wind Symphony, Chamber Orchestra, and Synthesis (the school's premier jazz band), which have toured many countries including Denmark, Hong Kong, Russia, the British Isles, and Central Europe. Additionally, BYU has a marching band program called the Cougar Marching Band.

BYU has a choral program with over 500 members. The four BYU auditioned choirs include the 40-member BYU Singers, the 90-member BYU Concert Choir, the 200-member BYU Men's Chorus (the largest male collegiate choir in the U.S.), and the 190-member BYU Women's Chorus. Both the BYU Men's Chorus and BYU Singers have toured across the United States and around the globe. Each of the four groups has recorded several times under BYU's label Tantara Records.

== Athletics ==
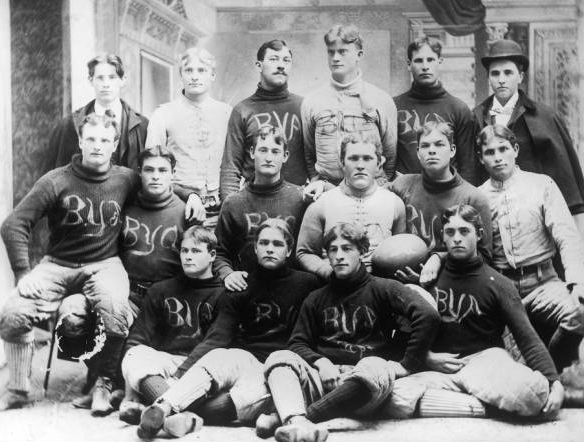
The school's first football team, which won the regional championship in 1896

BYU sponsors 21 athletic teams that compete in Division I of the NCAA, plus 6 teams that compete in extramural competition and over 50 intramural activities. All sports teams compete in the Big 12 Conference except for men's volleyball which is a member of the Mountain Pacific Sports Federation. BYU's sports teams have won a total of 14 NCAA championships and 26 non-NCAA championships. In 2021, BYU formally accepted an invitation to the Big 12 Conference and started participating in the conference in the 2023–24 school year. Also that year, BYU's athletics program was ranked #17 out of 293 Division I schools for overall athletics by the National Association of Collegiate Directors of Athletics (Directors' Cup).

BYU's athletic teams are named the "Cougars", with Cosmo the Cougar serving as the school's mascot since 1953. The school's fight song is the Cougar Fight Song. Because many of its players serve on full-time missions for two years (men when they are 18, women when 19), BYU athletes are often older on average than other schools' players. The NCAA allows students to serve missions for two years without subtracting that time from their eligibility period. This has caused minor controversy, but is largely recognized as not lending the school any significant advantage, since players receive no athletic and little physical training during their missions. BYU has also received attention from sports networks for refusal to play games on Sunday, as well as expelling players due to honor code violations.

The university's teams and individual players have won various awards for their achievements. Its football has had seven inductees into the College Football Hall of Fame and one Heisman Trophy winner, and it claims the National Championship in 1984. In basketball, BYU has had several standout basketball players including 2011 Naismith College Player of the Year Jimmer Fredette and 1981 John R. Wooden Award winner Danny Ainge.

== Student life ==
=== Religious atmosphere ===
BYU's stated mission "is to assist individuals in their quest for perfection and eternal life." BYU is thus considered by its leaders to be at heart a religious institution, wherein, ideally, religious and secular education are interwoven in a way that encourages the highest standards in both areas. This weaving of the secular and the religious aspects of a religious university goes back as far as Brigham Young himself, who told Karl G. Maeser when the church purchased the school: "I want you to remember that you ought not to teach even the alphabet or the multiplication tables without the Spirit of God."

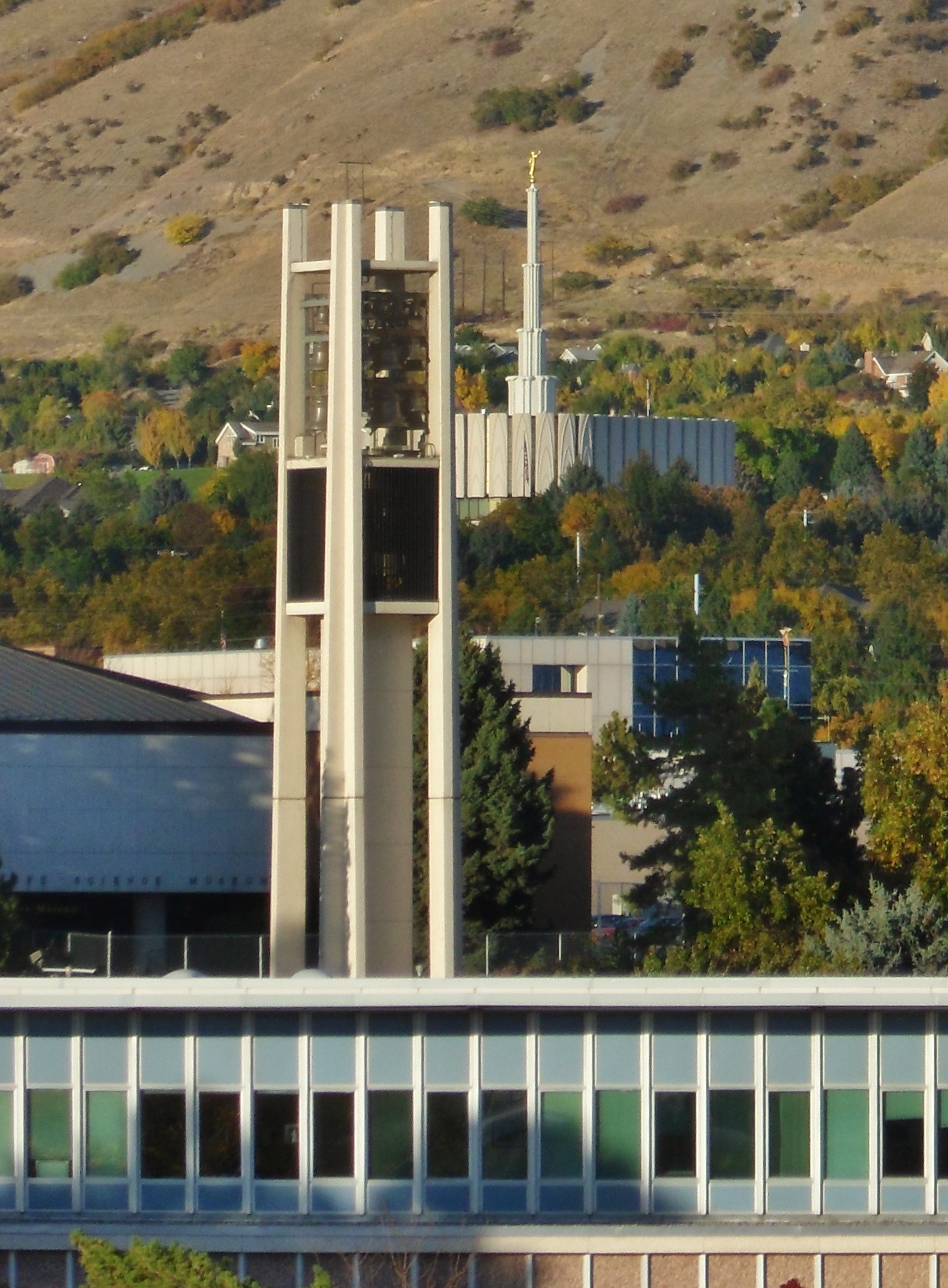
The BYU Bell Tower with the Provo Utah Temple in the background

BYU has been considered by some Latter-day Saints, as well as some university and church leaders, to be "The Lord's university". This phrase is used in reference to the school's mission as an ambassador to the world for the Church of Jesus Christ, and thus for Jesus Christ in Christianity. In the past, some students and faculty have expressed dissatisfaction with this nickname, stating that it gives students the idea that university authorities are always divinely inspired and never to be contradicted. Leaders of the school, however, acknowledge that the nickname represents more a goal that the university strives for and not its current state of being. Leaders encourage students and faculty to help fulfill the goal by following the teachings of their religion, adhering to the school's honor code, and serving others with the knowledge they gain while attending.

BYU mandates that its students who are Latter-day Saints be religiously active. All applicants are required to provide an endorsement from an ecclesiastic leader with their application for admittance. Over 900 rooms on the BYU campus are used for the purposes of Church congregations. More than 150 congregations meet on BYU campus each Sunday, where "BYU's campus becomes one of the busiest and largest centers of worship in the world" with about 24,000 persons attending church services on campus.

Some 97 percent of male BYU graduates and 32 percent of female graduates have served as Latter-day Saint missionaries. In October 2012, the church announced at its general conference that young men could serve a mission after they turn 18 and have graduated from high school. Since that time many young men have elected to enroll at BYU after their mission rather than taking a hiatus during their college studies. Missionary service often lasts up to two years for young men, and up to 18 months for young women.

=== Honor code ===
... Each member of the BYU community personally commits to observe these Honor Code standards approved by the Board of Trustees "at all times and in all things, and in all places" (Mosiah 18:9):

- Be honest.
- Live a chaste and virtuous life, including abstaining from any sexual relations outside a marriage between a man and a woman.
- Respect others, including the avoidance of profane and vulgar language.
- Obey the law and follow campus policies.
- Abstain from alcoholic beverages, tobacco, tea, coffee, vaping, and substance abuse.
- Participate regularly in Church services (required only of Church members).
- Observe Brigham Young University's Dress and Grooming Standards.
- Encourage others in their commitment to comply with the Honor Code.
— Church Educational System Honor Code Statement

All students and faculty, regardless of religion, are required to agree to adhere to an honor code. Early forms of the CES Honor Code are found as far back as the days of the Brigham Young Academy and early school President Karl G. Maeser. Maeser created the "Domestic Organization", a group of teachers who would visit students at their homes to ensure they were following the school's moral rules prohibiting obscenity, profanity, smoking, and alcohol consumption. The Honor Code was not formally created until about 1940, and was initially used mainly for cases of cheating and academic dishonesty.

President Wilkinson expanded the Honor Code in 1957 to include other school standards. This led to what the Honor Code represents today: rules regarding chastity, dress, grooming, drugs, and alcohol. A signed commitment to live the honor code is part of the application process, and must be adhered by all students, faculty, and staff. Students and faculty found in violation of standards are warned or called to meet with representatives of the Honor Council. In certain cases, students and faculty can be expelled or lose tenure. All students, regardless of religious affiliation or Church membership, are required to meet annually with a Church or other religious leader to receive an ecclesiastical endorsement for both acceptance and continuance at the university.

==== Policies around LGBTQ students ====
BYU has regularly been ranked among the least LGBTQ-friendly schools in the United States and its policies towards LGBTQ students have sparked criticism and protests. It continues to ban same-sex romantic behavior such as dating, holding hands, and kissing as of August 2023. Historically, experiences for BYU students identifying as LGBTQ have included being banned from enrolling due to their romantic attractions in the 60s, being required by school administration to undergo electroshock and vomit aversion therapies in the 1970s, having nearly 80% of BYU students reporting they'd refuse to live with an openly homosexual person in a poll in the 1990s, and a campus-wide ban on coming out until 2007.

Until 2021, there were not any LGBTQ–specific resources on campus, though there is now the Office of Student Success and Inclusion. Though the ban on coming out was lifted in 2007, LGBTQ BYU students are at risk of expulsion for any same-sex romantic expression including hugging and handholding. Before 2021, queer students were banned from meeting together in an LGBTQ–straight alliance group on-campus.

==== Effects on sexual assault reporting ====
Beginning in 2014 and continuing through 2016, some students reported that, after being sexually assaulted or raped, they were told they would face discipline because of honor code violations for consensual sexual relationships in violation of the policy that came to light during the investigation of reported sexual assaults. Criticism has been leveled that this atmosphere may prevent other students from reporting sexual assault crimes to police, a situation that local law enforcement have publicly criticized. In response, the Victim Services Coordinator of the Provo Police Department called for an amnesty clause to be added to the Honor Code, which would not punish sexual assault survivors for past honor code violations discovered during the investigation.

In 2016 and 2017 the Honor Code, in light of identified potential conflicts with Title IX obligations, was extensively reviewed and updated. As a result of a review, which concluded in October 2016, BYU announced several changes to how it would handle sexual assault reports, including adding an amnesty clause, and ensuring under most circumstances that information is not shared between Title IX Office and Honor Code Office without the victim's consent. In June 2017, the policy was further revised to affirm that "BYU strongly encourages the reporting of all incidents of sexual misconduct so that support services can be offered to victims and sexual misconduct can be prevented and stopped". Current policy assures that victims "will not be disciplined by the university for any related honor code violation occurring at or near the time of the reported sexual misconduct unless a person's health or safety is at risk."

=== Culture and activities ===
Undergraduate demographics as of fall 2020
Race and ethnicity	Total
White	81%
Hispanic	7%
Other (Note: Other consists of Multiracial Americans & those who prefer to not say.)	5%
Foreign national	3%
Asian	2%
Pacific Islander	1%
Economic diversity
Low-income (Note: The percentage of students who received an income-based federal Pell grant intended for low-income students.)	14%
Affluent (Note: The percentage of students who are a part of the American middle class at the bare minimum.)	86%

BYU was ranked by The Princeton Review in 2008 as 14th in the nation for having the happiest students and highest quality of life. The Princeton Review has also ranked BYU the "#1 stone-cold sober school" in the nation for 22 consecutive years, most likely due to students' adherence to the university's Honor Code. Additionally, according to the Uniform Crime Reports, incidents of crime in Provo are lower than the national average, with murder classified as very rare and robberies are about 1/10 the national average. In 2016, Business Insider rated BYU as the #1 safest college campus in the nation.

Fraternities and sororities are prohibited at BYU, so most on-campus student activities and clubs are organized by the BYU Student Service Association (BYU SA), the university's official student association, or by campus wards and stakes (official religious divisions with student leaders, budgets, and regular activities). Other groups such as comedy troupe Divine Comedy are sponsored by academic departments.

BYU's Wilkinson Center serves as the hub for entertainment on campus and includes a bowling alley, a movie theater, and an eatery. BYU's Outdoors Unlimited service provides rental and repairs for recreational equipment to help students take advantage of nearby outdoor activities like mountain biking, backpacking, rafting, and skiing.

== Media ==
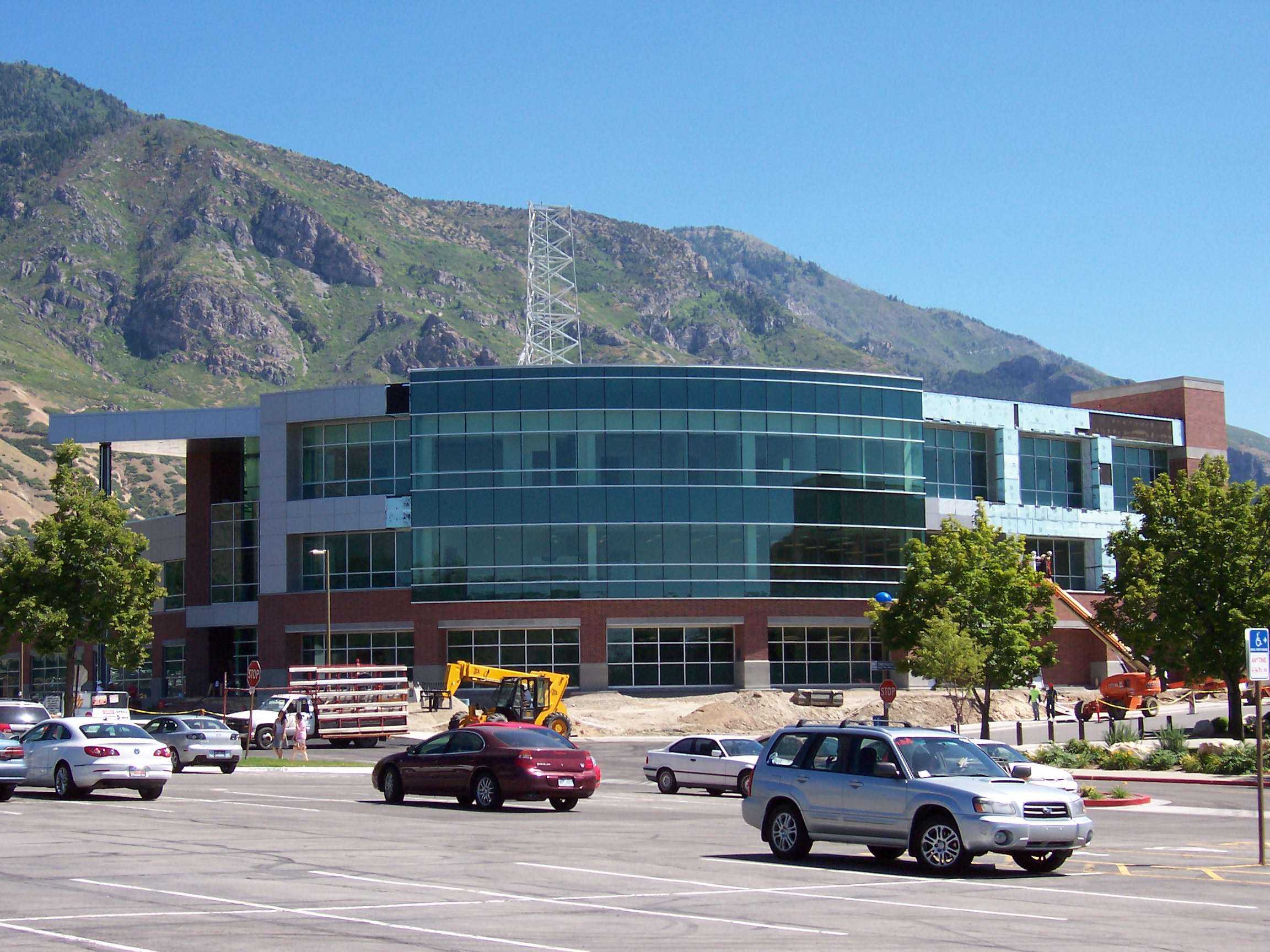
The BYU Broadcasting building under construction, August 2010

The BYU Broadcasting Technical Operations Center is an HD production and distribution facility that is home to local independent station KBYU-TV, local classical music station KBYU-FM Classical 89, BYU Radio, BYU Radio Instrumental, BYU Radio International, BYU TV and BYU Television International with content in Spanish and Portuguese (both available via terrestrial, satellite, and internet signals). BYU TV is also available via cable throughout some areas of the United States. The BYU Broadcasting Technical Operations Center is home to three television production studios, two television control rooms, radio studios, radio performance space, and master control operations.

The university produces a weekly newspaper called The Universe (it was published daily until 2012), maintains an online news site that is regularly updated called The Digital Universe and has a daily news program broadcast via KBYU-TV. The university also has a recording label called Tantara Records which is run by the BYU School of Music and promotes the works of student ensembles and faculty.

Y Magazine is the university's alumni publication, distributed quarterly to more than 200,000 addresses. With a history that dates back to the 1920s, Y Magazine covers a wide variety of BYU activities, from student life and alumni activities to athletics and research. BYU Today is the magazine's email newsletter, distributed twice a month.

== Alumni ==
As of 2022, BYU had 443,426 living alumni. Alumni relations are coordinated and activities are held at the Gordon B. Hinckley Alumni and Visitors Center.

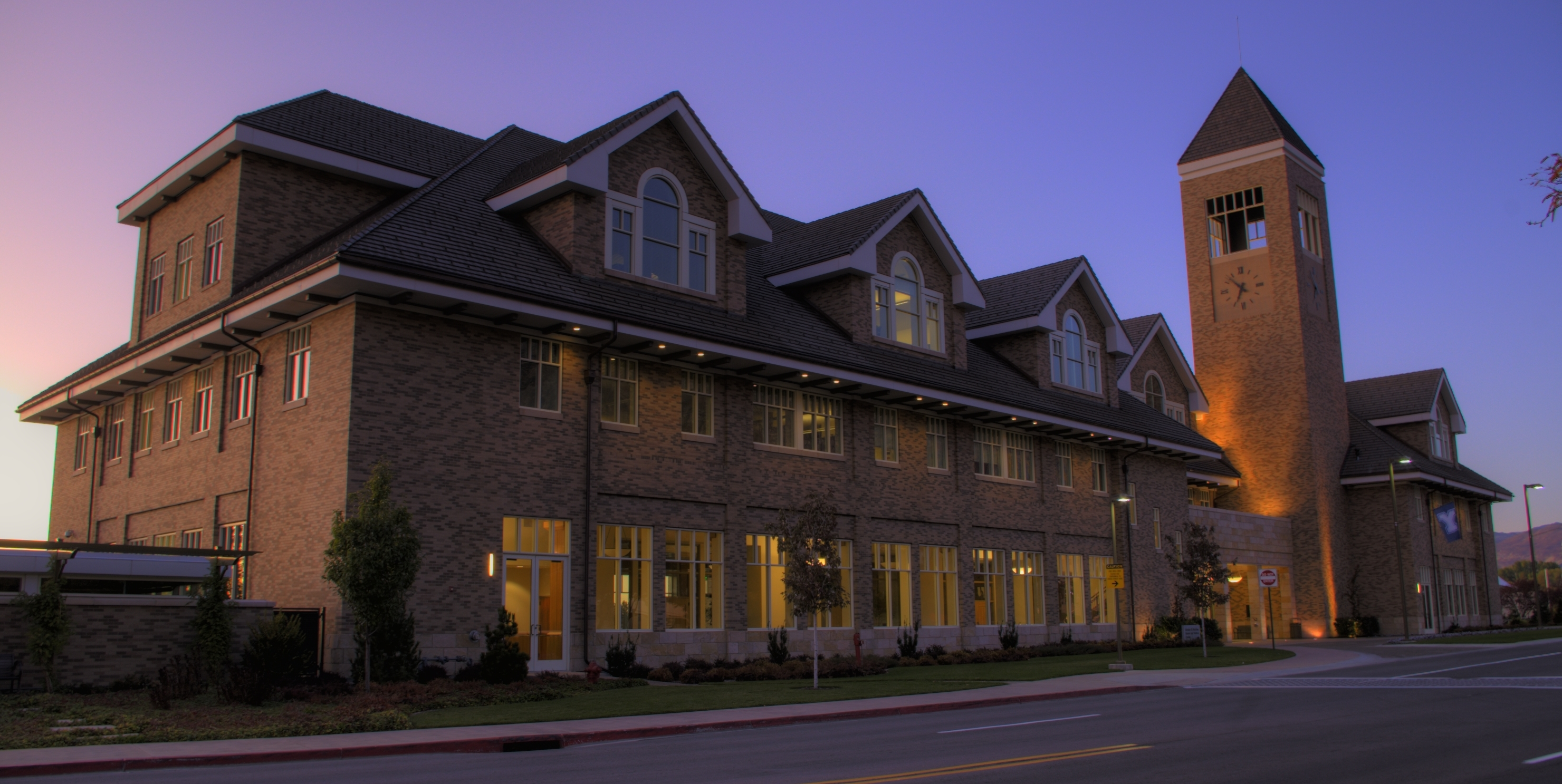
Gordon B. Hinckley Alumni and Visitors Center

More than 20 BYU graduates have served in the United States Congress, including former Dean of the U.S. Senate Reed Smoot (1876) and former President pro tempore of the United States Senate Orrin Hatch. BYU graduates have served in the Cabinet of the United States, including former Secretary of Agriculture Ezra Taft Benson and former United States Solicitor General Rex E. Lee. BYU graduate Mitt Romney was the 2012 Republican presidential nominee, in addition to serving as a U.S. senator and governor of Massachusetts. BYU graduate George Sutherland (1881) served as an associate justice of the Supreme Court of the United States, and many BYU graduates have been law clerks for various justices of the court, or served as judges for various United States courts of appeals or United States district courts.

BYU alumni in academia have included Yale provost Scott Strobel; former BYU presidents Dallin H. Oaks, Jeffrey R. Holland, and Kevin J. Worthen; former president of Texas A&M University Michael K. Young; former president of Utah Valley University Matthew S. Holland; former president of Utah State University Stan L. Albrecht; and former president of Utah Tech University (formerly known as Dixie State University) Stephen D. Nadauld. The university also graduated Nobel laureate Paul D. Boyer. Philo Farnsworth (inventor of the electronic television) received an honorary degree in 1967. Harvey Fletcher (inventor of the hearing aid) is also a graduate of the university.

Alumni of BYU have served as business leaders, including Gary Crittenden, Deseret Book CEO Sheri L. Dew, and former Dell CEO Kevin Rollins.

In literature and journalism, BYU has produced several best-selling authors, including Orson Scott Card, Stephenie Meyer, Brandon Sanderson, and Tara Westover. BYU also graduated American activist and ABC News contributor Elizabeth Smart-Gilmour. Other media personalities include award-winning ESPN sportscaster and former Miss America Sharlene Wells Hawkes and former co-host of CBS's The Early Show Jane Clayson Johnson.

In entertainment and television, BYU is represented by animator and filmmaker Don Bluth; Richard Dutcher, the "Father of Mormon Cinema"; Golden Globe-nominated Aaron Eckhart; Jon Heder, best known for his role as Napoleon Dynamite; Jeopardy! "Greatest of All Time" champion and later host Ken Jennings; Academy Award-winning filmmaker Kieth Merrill; YouTuber and former NASA engineer Mark Rober; and Johnny Whitaker, best known for his role as Jody in Family Affair.

In the music industry, BYU is represented by numerous artists, including Emmy Award-winning composer Kurt Bestor, Metropolitan Opera singer Ariel Bybee, Emmy Award-winning composer Sam Cardon, composer Rob Gardner, chart-topping songwriter Tony Martin, chart-topping and award-winning violinist Lindsey Stirling, Daniel Truman, keyboardist for the Grammy Award-winning band Diamond Rio, and Tabernacle Choir director Mack Wilberg.

BYU has also produced many religious leaders. Among the alumni are several Latter-day Saint General Authorities, including three Church Presidents (Ezra Taft Benson, Thomas S. Monson, and Dallin H. Oaks, as well as several Apostles, including Neil L. Andersen, David A. Bednar, D. Todd Christofferson, Clark G. Gilbert, Gerrit W. Gong, Jeffrey R. Holland, and Reed Smoot (1876), and two general presidents of the Relief Society, Julie B. Beck and Belle Spafford.

A number of BYU alumni have found success in professional sports, representing the university in 7 MLB World Series, 5 NBA Finals, and 25 NFL Super Bowls. In baseball, BYU alumni include All-Stars Rick Aguilera, Wally Joyner, and Jack Morris. Professional basketball players include three-time NBA champion Danny Ainge, NBA center Shawn Bradley, three-time Olympic medalist and Hall of Famer Krešimir Ćosić, consensus 2011 national college player of the year Jimmer Fredette, and 1952 NBA Rookie of the Year and four-time NBA All-Star Mel Hutchins. BYU also claims notable professional football players including Heisman Trophy winner Ty Detmer, two-time Super Bowl winners Jim McMahon and Kyle Van Noy, and two-time NFL MVP, Super Bowl MVP, and Pro Football Hall of Fame quarterback Steve Young, as well as Kansas City Chiefs head coach Andy Reid. In golf, BYU alumni include two major championship winners: Johnny Miller at the 1973 U.S. Open and 1976 British Open, and Mike Weir at the 2003 Masters.

Famous BYU alumni

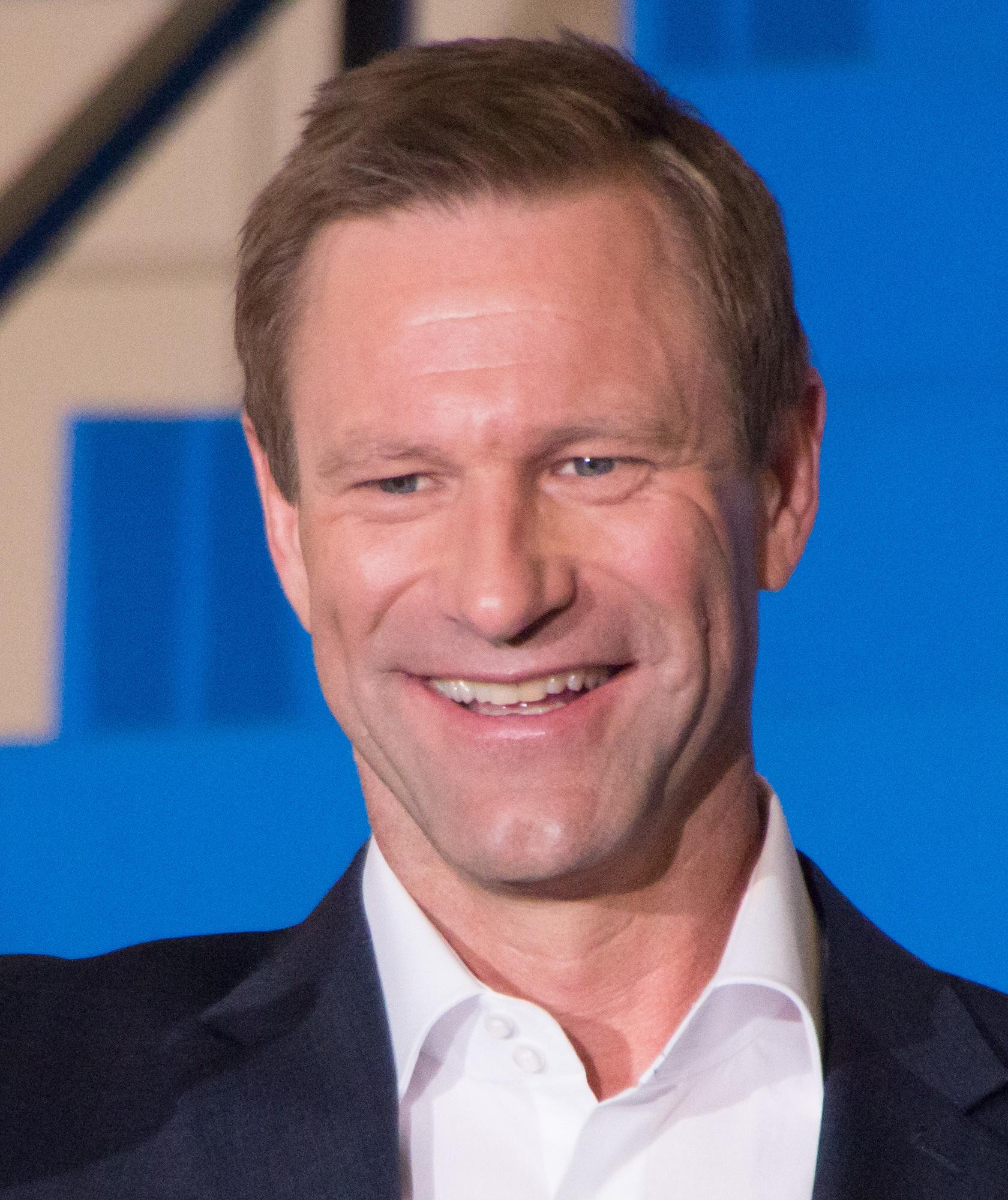
Aaron Eckhart
Golden Globe-nominated actor

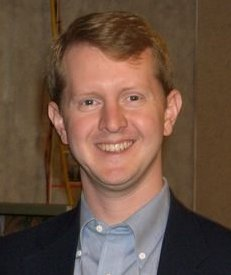
Ken Jennings
highest-earning U.S. game show contestant and current Jeopardy! host

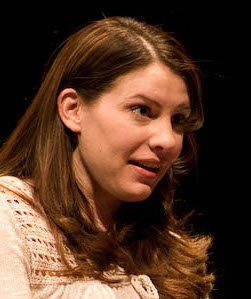
Stephenie Meyer
author of the Twilight series

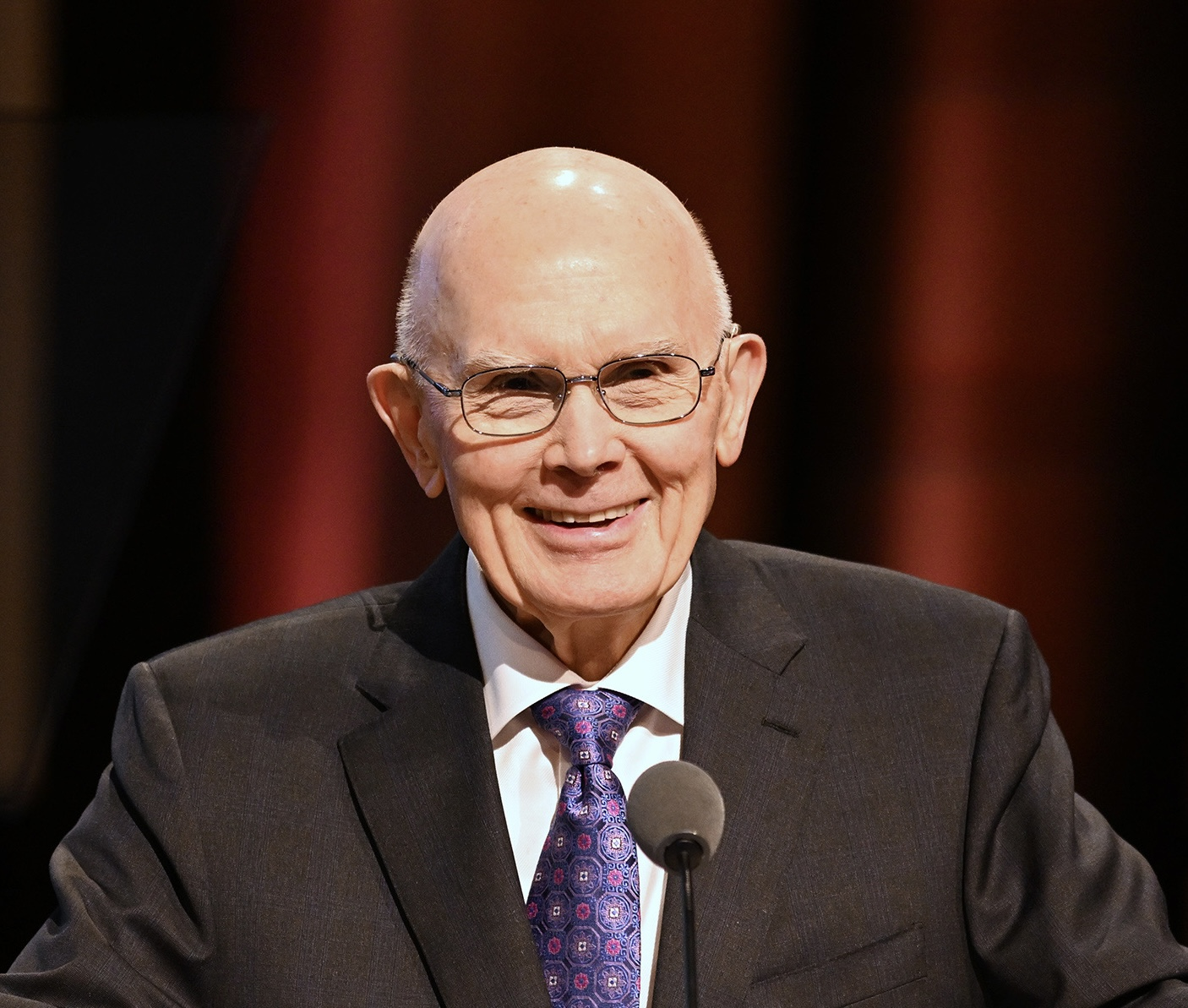
Dallin H. Oaks
18th president of the Church of Jesus Christ of Latter-day Saints, Utah Supreme Court Justice, and 8th president of BYU

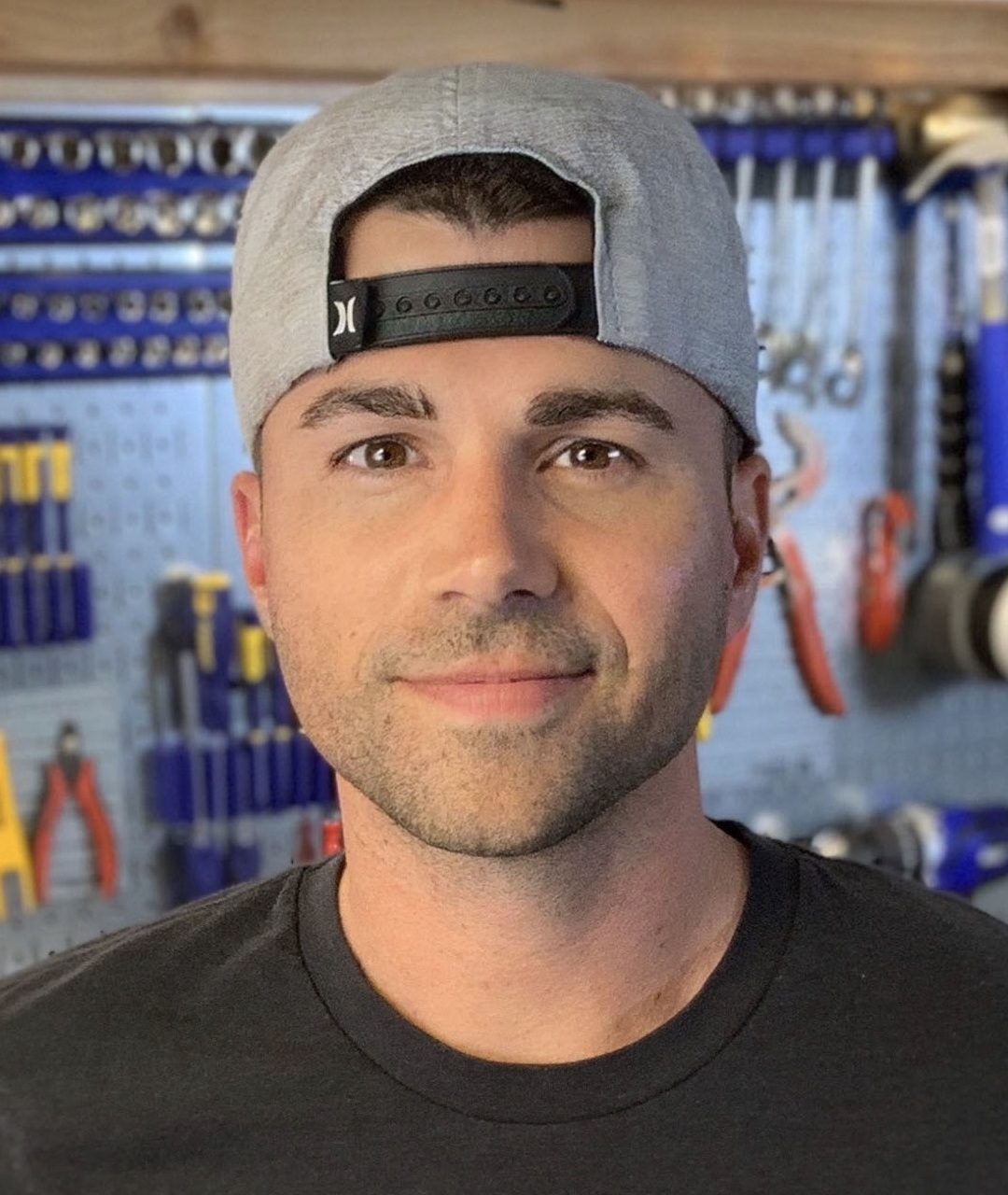
Mark Rober
YouTuber and former NASA engineer

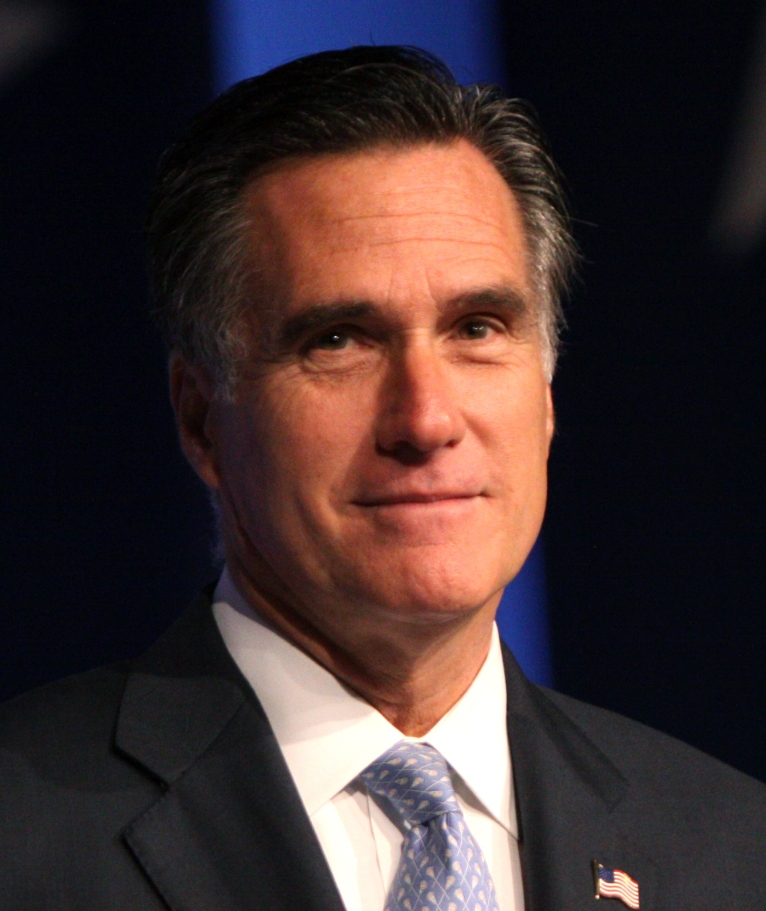
Mitt Romney
U.S. senator and former governor of Massachusetts / 2012 Republican Presidential nominee

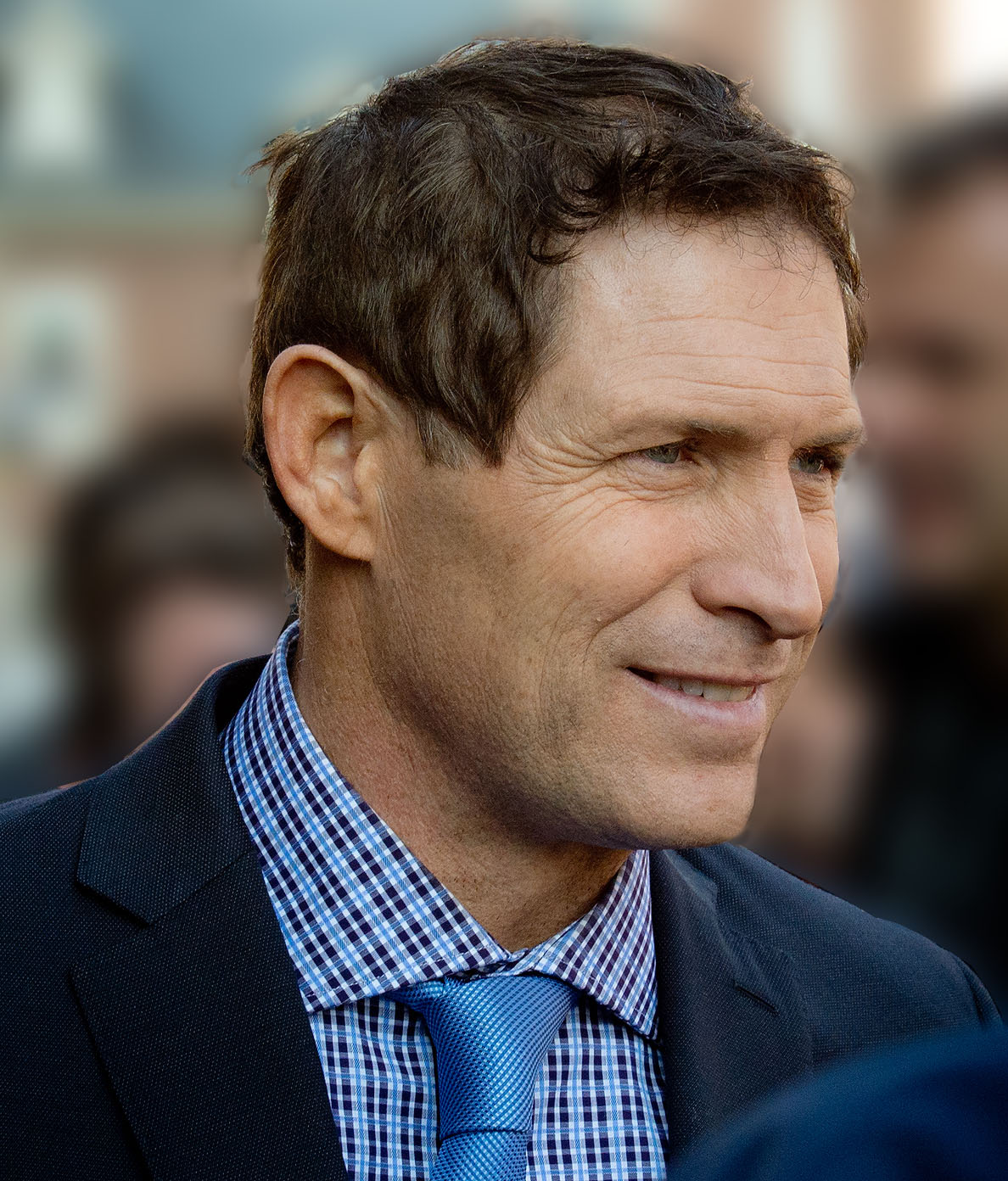
Steve Young
Pro Football Hall of Fame quarterback

== See also ==
- List of colleges and universities in Utah
