= Cecil O. Samuelson =

American religious leader and physician

Cecil O. Samuelson Jr.
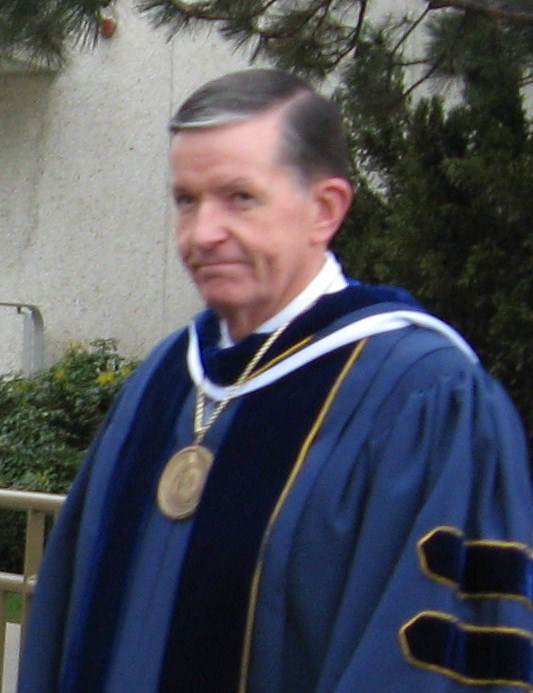
- Samuelson leading the April 2008 commencement exercises at BYU

First Quorum of the Seventy
- October 1, 1994 – October 1, 2011
- End reason: Granted general authority emeritus status

Presidency of the Seventy
- August 15, 2001 – April 5, 2003
- End reason: Honorably released to become president of BYU

Emeritus General Authority
- October 1, 2011

12th President of Brigham Young University

In office
- May 1, 2003 – May 1, 2014
- Predecessor: Merrill J. Bateman
- Successor: Kevin J Worthen

Personal details
- Born: August 1, 1941 (age 84); Salt Lake City, Utah, U.S.
- Education: University of Utah (BS, MEd, MD)
- Spouse(s): Sharon Giauque Samuelson

Cecil Osborn Samuelson Jr. (born Aug 1, 1941) is an American retired rheumatologist and professor of medicine who served as the 12th president of Brigham Young University (BYU) from 2003 to 2014. Samuelson is an emeritus general authority of the Church of Jesus Christ of Latter-day Saints (LDS Church), a former dean of the school of medicine at the University of Utah, and a former senior vice president of Intermountain Health Care (IHC). While he was president at BYU, Samuelson pushed professors and students to raise their expectations and encouraged mentored learning. During his presidency, student enrollment limits stayed constant, new sports coaches were hired, new buildings were built, and a hiring freeze during the Great Recession reduced faculty.

== Education ==
Samuelson holds a bachelor's degree, a master's degree in educational psychology, and an M.D. from the University of Utah. He completed his residency at Duke University Medical Center in Durham, North Carolina. He is a Brother of Pi Kappa Alpha International Fraternity.

Samuelson worked at the University of Utah in 1973 as assistant dean of admissions and at the medical school as a faculty member. In 1977, he became acting dean of the University of Utah medical school, and in 1985 was promoted to dean of the medical school. In 1988 he became vice president over health services at the University of Utah, where he gained a reputation as a sensitive negotiator. In 1990, IHC appointed Samuelson as senior vice president and then IHC Hospital president.

== BYU President ==
At the beginning of Samuelson's tenure as president of BYU, he invited students and faculty to "raise the bar" in their learning and teaching and in their expectations of student behavior. During his time as president, the College of Health and Human Performance was dissolved into existing colleges. The university replaced old student dorms with New Heritage Housing, and built the Gordon B. Hinckley Alumni and Visitors Center (2007), BYU Broadcasting Building (2011), and Life Sciences Building (2014). During the 2008 recession, along with the LDS Church which owns and operates the university, BYU instituted a hiring freeze for almost two years, and 70-80 faculty retired or left. Enrollment limits stayed consistent, and Samuelson pushed for more mentored learning experiences, where professors work together with students on research.

In 2005, the university hired Bronco Mendenhall to coach the football team, Tom Holmoe to direct the athletic department, and Dave Rose to coach the basketball team. In 2011, BYU football signed an 8-year contract with ESPN. In 2004, students started cheering "Woosh, Cecil" after successful BYU basketball free throws, in an effort to elicit a response from Samuelson, who often attended games. Samuelson acknowledged the cheer with a thumbs-up in 2009, and continued to give a thumbs-up to subsequent free throw cheers. The tradition inspired the BYU Creamery to name an ice cream flavor "Whoosh, Cecil". In 2006, students created "Cecil is my homeboy" t-shirts, which became part of student culture.

Samuelson gave a talk in September 2007 to BYU students, quoting statements by J. Reuben Clark that the Constitution of the United States was not "a fully grown document", and that "we believe it must grow and develop to meet the changing needs of an advancing world." He also stated, in agreement with the doctrine of LDS Church, that the Constitution is a divinely inspired document.

On March 11, 2014, it was announced that Samuelson would be succeeded by Kevin J Worthen as the president of BYU, effective May 1, 2014. In November 2014, he began service as president of the church's Salt Lake Temple.

== Other LDS Church callings ==
Samuelson served in the church as a full-time missionary in Scotland as a young adult and has continued church service in his adulthood. From 1977 to 1982 he served as president of a stake on the campus of the University of Utah. He was called to the First Quorum of the Seventy in 1994, and while a general authority he served as an area president, in the Presidency of the Seventy, and as general president of the church's Sunday School organization.

While serving in the presidency of the North America West Area, Samuelson was a signatory to a May 11, 1999 letter to all adult congregants in California which encouraged members to donate time and money to pass Proposition 22.

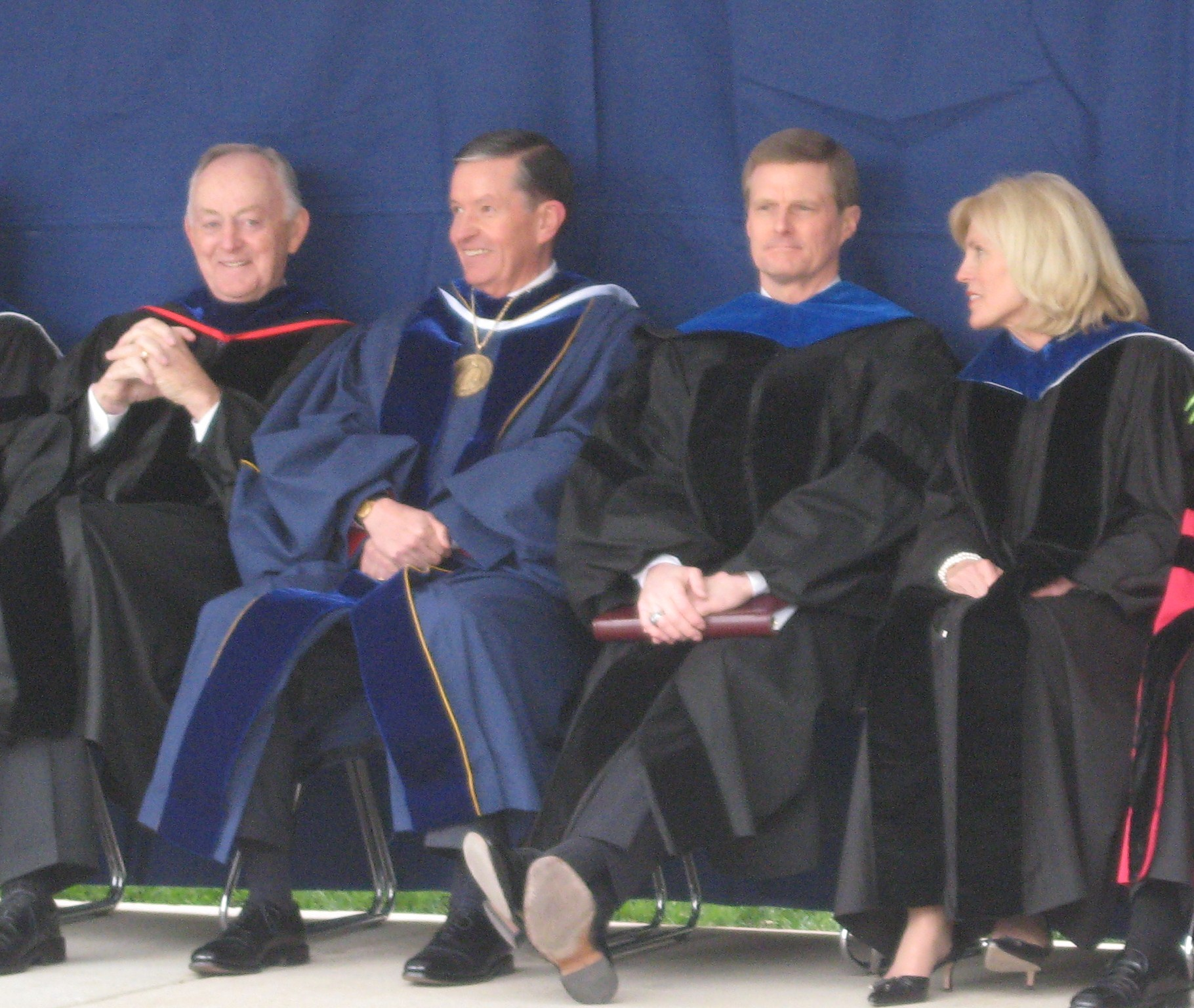
Samuelson at April 2008 BYU Commencement with Elaine S. Dalton, W. Rolfe Kerr, and David A. Bednar.

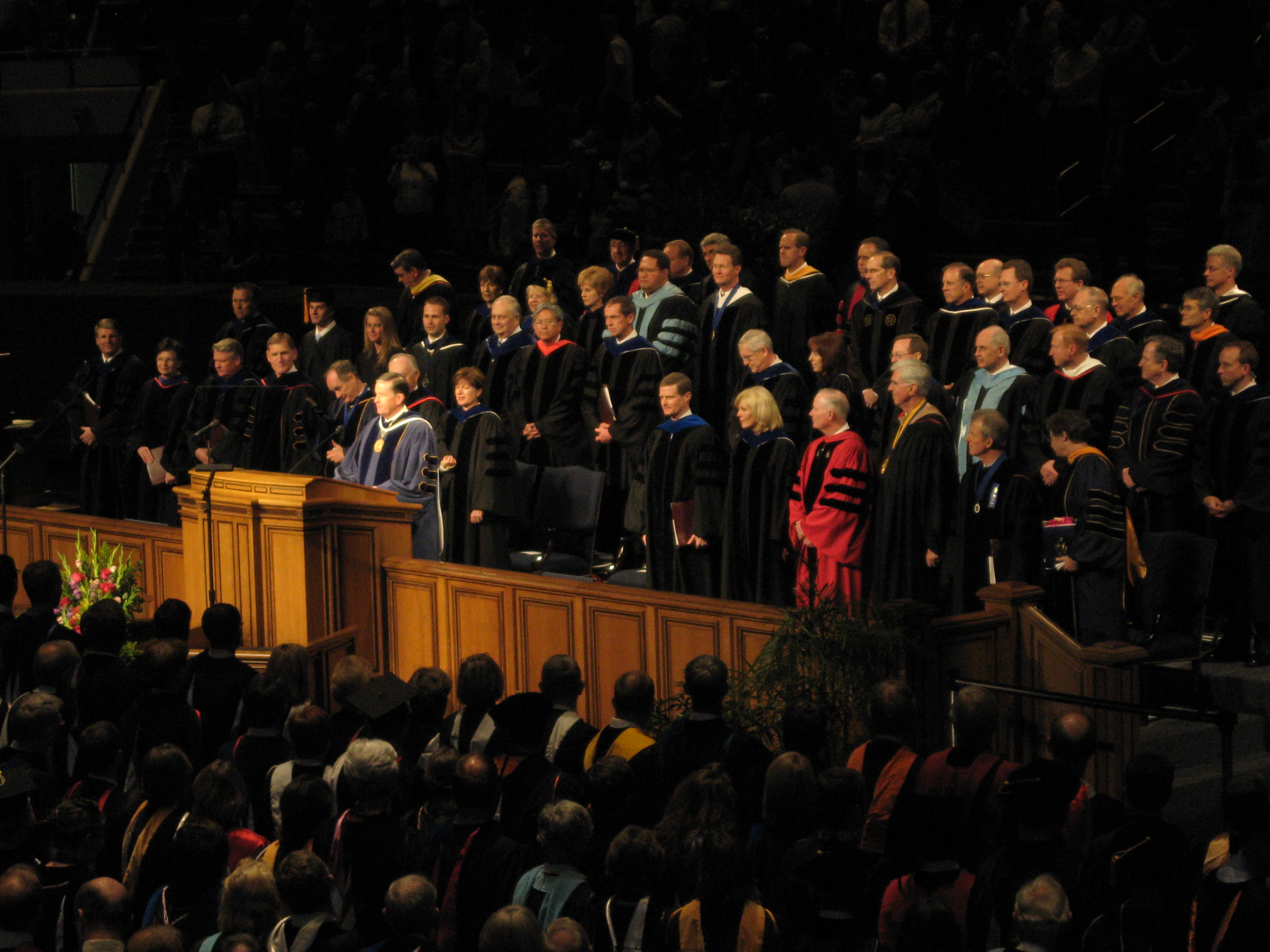
Samuelson conducting the April 2008 BYU Commencement.

Academic offices
Preceded by Merrill J. Bateman	President of Brigham Young University; 2003 – 2014	Succeeded by Kevin J Worthen
