= Merrill J. Bateman =

American religious leader (born 1936)

Emeritus General Authority
- October 6, 2007

Presidency of the Seventy
- August 15, 2003 – August 15, 2007
- End reason: Honorably released

First Quorum of the Seventy
- December 27, 1995 – October 6, 2007
- End reason: Granted general authority emeritus status

Presiding Bishop
- April 2, 1994 – December 27, 1995
- End reason: Released to become president of BYU

Second Quorum of the Seventy
- June 6, 1992 – April 2, 1994
- End reason: Called as Presiding Bishop

11th President of Brigham Young University

In office
- January 1, 1996 – May 1, 2003
- Predecessor: Rex E. Lee
- Successor: Cecil O. Samuelson

Personal details
- Born: Merrill Joseph Bateman; June 19, 1936 (age 89); Lehi, Utah, U.S.
- Spouse(s): Marilyn Scholes
- Children: 7

Merrill Joseph Bateman (born June 19, 1936) is an American religious leader who was the 11th president of Brigham Young University (BYU) from 1996 to 2003. He is an emeritus general authority of the Church of Jesus Christ of Latter-day Saints (LDS Church) and was the LDS Church's 12th presiding bishop in 1994 and 1995. Bateman was the Sunday School General President of the LDS Church from 2003 to 2004, a member of the Church's Presidency of the Seventy from 2003 to 2007, and the president of the Provo Utah Temple from 2007 to 2010.

== Early life and education ==
Bateman was born in Lehi, Utah. As he was starting the third grade his family moved to American Fork. He was a missionary in England in the mid-1950s. After returning from his mission, he married Marilyn Scholes in 1959 and joined the ROTC. In 1960, Bateman completed a bachelor's degree in economics at the University of Utah. Bateman received a Danforth Fellowship and a Woodrow Wilson Fellowship, which enabled him to study at the Massachusetts Institute of Technology for his doctorate. Bateman's experience in researching Ghana's trade position led to him lecturing in economics at the University of Ghana in 1963, and while living there, he studied the cocoa industry. Under supervision of Franklin M. Fisher, Bateman graduated in 1965. His thesis was on the subject of international cocoa trade in Ghana.

== Academic background ==
Bateman was associate professor of economics at the United States Air Force Academy, 1964–67; professor of economics at BYU and director of Center for Business and Economic Research, 1967–71; and dean of the BYU business school, now the Marriott School of Business, 1975–79. While he was dean, he instituted the BYU Management Society in 1977.

== President of BYU ==
Bateman was inaugurated as president of BYU on April 25, 1996. That September, an anonymous professor publicly accused Bateman (in Sunstone) of plagiarizing ideas in his inauguration speech from an article by Gertrude Himmelfarb. Bateman acknowledged that since the citation came after a direct quote, it was ambiguous, and promised to make future citations more clear.

Bateman organized BYU's objectives into five main objectives that centered on the university's official aims and mission statement. He encouraged students to come to weekly Tuesday devotionals in Sunday dress to make the Marriott Center "a temple."

During Bateman's administration at BYU, the university changed in a number of ways. The school's endowment was significantly increased through the Lighting the Way Campaign that Rex E. Lee started. The Mentored Learning program, involving undergraduates more directly in research, was also initiated. About a third of the faculty were replaced due to natural turnover. The enrollment cap was raised from 27,000 to 29,000, and an open enrollment summer program was started. The Bachelors of General Studies, a degree one can earn entirely from continuing education courses, was formed.

Sports during Bateman's time as president also underwent changes. BYU's colors and logos changed, as did the athletic director and men's basketball coach. The university started building a new baseball/softball facility and established a student athlete center. BYU left the Western Athletic Conference and joined the Mountain West Conference. Bateman focused on Sears Cup rankings of sports programs, which improved during his presidency, with eight sports in the top ten in 1999.

In 2002, the Marriott School began giving the Merrill J. Bateman award to BYU students who serve and lead in their communities.

== Work and family ==
Bateman was an executive with Mars, Incorporated in England and the United States from 1971 to 1975, and for a brief time in 1979 before heading his own consulting and capital management companies in Orem, Utah. Bateman's consulting involved analyzing patterns in raw food costs, foreign currency rates, and other factors for companies like Kraft Foods and General Foods.

Bateman and his wife, Marilyn, are the parents of seven children.

== LDS Church service ==
In the early 1980s, Bateman was president of the Provo Utah Sharon East Stake.

Due to his work in the cocoa business, Bateman made many trips in west Africa, including Ghana. In 1977, James E. Faust, a general authority then serving as president of the church's International Mission, asked Bateman to contact church members and people who had asked for church material on his next visit to Ghana. Bateman did this in early 1978. Later in 1978, shortly after the church changed the policy allowing black men to receive the priesthood, Bateman was sent on a special assignment to Africa by the First Presidency, along with Edwin Q. Cannon, a counselor in the International Mission, to lay the groundwork for the opening of missionary work there. They visited people who desired to join the church in both Ghana and Nigeria, including Billy Johnson.

As a general authority, Bateman was president of the church's Japan Area for nine months in 1993 and 1994. In April 1994 he was called as the church's Presiding Bishop, where he served until being appointed as president of BYU at the end of 1995.

Academic offices
Preceded by Rex E. Lee	President of BYU; 1996–2003	Succeeded by Cecil O. Samuelson
The Church of Jesus Christ of Latter-day Saints titles
Preceded by Robert D. Hales	Presiding Bishop; April 2, 1994 – December 27, 1995	Succeeded by H. David Burton
