= Kevin J Worthen =

American lawyer and educational administrator

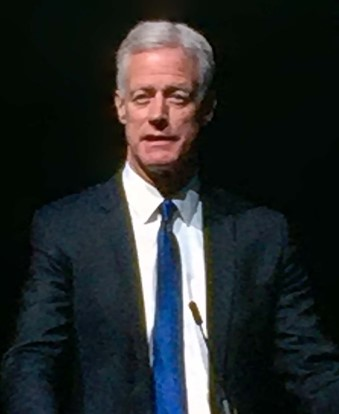

13th President of Brigham Young University
- In office May 1, 2014 – May 1, 2023
- Preceded by: Cecil O. Samuelson
- Succeeded by: C. Shane Reese

Personal details
- Born: April 15, 1956 (age 70) Dragerton, Utah, U.S.
- Spouse: Peggy Sealey Worthen
- Children: 3
- Education: Brigham Young University (BA, JD)
- Profession: Academic administrator, professor of law, attorney
- Website: BYU's Office of the President

Kevin J Worthen (born April 15, 1956) is an American professor who served as the 13th president of Brigham Young University (BYU) from 2014 to 2023. From 2010 to 2021, he also served as an area seventy in The Church of Jesus Christ of Latter-day Saints (LDS Church). Worthen served previously at BYU as the Advancement Vice President and as dean of the J. Reuben Clark Law School (JRCL).

In 2023, Worthen was appointed as both the Michael Doyle and Bunny Winter Distinguished Visiting Professor of Law and a Senior Research Scholar at Yale Law School and the first BYU Wheatley Institute Distinguished Fellow in Constitutional Government. He also continues to hold the Hugh W. Colton Professor of Law position at BYU Law School.

== Early life and career ==
The youngest of four children, Worthen was born in Dragerton, Utah and raised in Price, Utah. He served as an LDS missionary in Monterrey, Mexico. Worthen earned an associate degree from the College of Eastern Utah (CEU), where he was co-captain of the varsity basketball team and graduated co-valedictorian in 1978. While at CEU, Worthen worked summers as a coal miner. He graduated summa cum laude with a bachelor's degree in political science from BYU in 1979.

In 1982, Worthen graduated summa cum laude from BYU's JRCL at the top of his class. He earned the distinction of Order of the Coif. Following graduation, he clerked for Judge Malcolm Wilkey of the United States Court of Appeals for the D.C. Circuit, and for Justice Byron White of the United States Supreme Court. He practiced law in Phoenix, Arizona from 1984 to 1987 with the law firm of Jennings, Strouss & Salmon. While practicing law in Arizona, Worthen found that he was very interested in the history of laws, leading him to consider teaching law.

== JRCL faculty and BYU administration positions ==
In 1987, Worthen returned to BYU as a member of the JRCL's faculty and served as its dean from 2004 to 2008. As a Fulbright Scholar, he also spent a year working as a visiting instructor at University of Chile Law School in 1994. Worthen is an expert in American Indian law. His theory of cultural and ethnic assimilation draws on the history of indigenous groups and posits that since traditional "assimilation" is impossible, governments should work with indigenous groups as associational groups. Worthen was a 1995 contributor to Cohen's Handbook of Federal Indian Law, and served as vice-chair of the Utah Constitution Revision Commission from 2001 to 2003. While working for BYU, Worthen has served as faculty athletic representative to the NCAA for four years and as chair of the University Athletic Advisory Council from 1992 to 2000. He has also been the Hugh W. Colton professor at BYU.

Worthen has written articles on issues related to Native American law and marriage definition in law. He also wrote an article entitled The NCAA and Religion: Issues of non-state governance that was published in the Utah Law Review.

In June 2008, Worthen was appointed BYU's Advancement Vice President, with responsibility for university relations, communications, athletics, and philanthropies. In 2010 Worthen was made the chair of the membership review committee of the Association of American Law Schools.

== BYU president ==
On March 11, 2014, Henry B. Eyring, First Vice Chairman of the BYU Board of Trustees, announced that effective May 1, 2014, Worthen would succeed Cecil O. Samuelson as the president of BYU. Worthen was officially inaugurated as BYU's 13th president September 9, 2014, in a special devotional assembly. Eyring gave the installation charge and spoke at the event. Other members of the board were also in attendance, along with former BYU presidents and presidents of other universities.

In late 2016, Worthen was pressured by Air Force officials to make an exemption to the honor code so the person the Air Force chose could be placed as head of the ROTC division at BYU, but Worthen refused to budge from the code.

In December 2017, Worthen announced a 10-year-deal that would give BYU students free ridership on the regional bus and commuter rail transit system.

In the fall of 2017, as a follow-up to remarks given by Worthen at the university conference in 2016, BYU created an office of experiential learning, to coordinate and increase internships, volunteer positions and other opportunities to apply learning and professionalize degrees.

=== Title IX regulations ===
In April 2016, Worthen announced the appointment of a BYU advisory committee to investigate how to improve handling alleged sexual assault situations involving students. In August, the U.S. Department of Education's Office for Civil Rights investigated the university. Based on the BYU committee's recommendations, BYU adopted policies that provided amnesty for honor code investigations for actions taken at or near the time women were sexually assaulted. Other changes included having the Title IX Office report directly to the student life vice president, and the physically separating the location of the two offices, relative to one another. The Title IX Office will include a full-time director.

== Personal life ==
Worthen married Peggy Sealey Worthen in 1978 and they are the parents of three children and live in Provo, Utah.

In April 2010, Worthen became an area seventy in the LDS Church. Worthen served previously in the church as a bishop and as president of the Provo Utah Sharon East Stake from 2007 to 2010. He was released as an area seventy in August 2021, but retained his assignment as president of BYU until May 2023.

== See also ==
- List of law clerks for the sixth seat of the Supreme Court of the United States
- List of J. Reuben Clark Law School alumni

Academic offices
Preceded by Cecil O. Samuelson	President of Brigham Young University; 2014–2023	Succeeded by C. Shane Reese
