= Carl S. Hawkins =

American lawyer

Carl Stolworthy Hawkins (1926–2010) was a prominent American lawyer, law school dean and also a local leader in the Church of Jesus Christ of Latter-day Saints.

Hawkins was the son of William D. Hawkins and his wife the former Wilma Stolworthy. Hawkins was raised in Provo, Utah and graduated from Provo High School. He then joined the United States Army Air Corps with which he served as a radio operator for the Pacific Theatre of Operations of World War II. On September 11, 1946 Hawkins married Nelma Jean Jones in the Salt Lake Temple.

Hawkins received his bachelor's degree from Brigham Young University (BYU) in political science. He earned his law degree from Northwestern University. In 1952–1953, Hawkins was a law clerk to Fred M. Vinson. While he was at Northwestern he was editor-in-chief of the Illinois Law Review now known as the Northwestern University Law Review. He was then a Harry A. Bigelow Teaching Fellow at the University of Chicago Law School,

Hawkins then joined the law firm of Wilkinson, Cragun, Barker & Hawkins, where he was involved in cases for Native American tribes for payments from the United States government.

From 1957 to 1973, Hawkins was a professor at the University of Michigan. While in Michigan Hawkins was a consultant to the state legislature on forming laws. He was also the executive secretary of the Michigan Law Revision Commission and worked with the Michigan Supreme Court in formulating rules for jury instruction. Hawkins co-authored two casebooks on tort law.

Hawkins served for a time as bishop of the Ann Arbor Ward of The Church of Jesus Christ of Latter-day Saints. He also served as president of the Detroit Stake and then as the first president of the Dearborn Stake of the Church of Jesus Christ of Latter-day Saints.

In 1973 Hawkins went to Brigham Young University as one of the founding members of the J. Reuben Clark Law School. He was acting dean of BYU's law school from 1975 to 1977 and dean from 1981 to 1985 and was a professor there until 1991. Hawkins was the inaugural holder of the Guy Wilson Chiar at the J. Reuben Clark Law School. Hawkins also was a visiting professor at the University of Georgia, Pepperdine University, Washburn University, and the University of New Mexico. He also took a two-year leave from BYU to serve as executive director of the Florida Academic Task Force for Review of Insurance and Tort Systems.

Hawkins was appointed to the Judge Nominating Commission of the 10th United States Circuit Court by Jimmy Carter. He also served on Utah's Alcohol Control Board.

Carl and Nelma Hawkins were the parents of five children.

== See also ==
- List of law clerks for the chief justice of the United States

== Sources ==
- University of Michigan bio
- article published on Hawkins shortly after his death
- obituary of Hawkins
- LDS Church Almanac, 2008 Edition, p. 237
- Deseret News. May 1, 2010, obituary of Carl Hawkins
