= List of presidents of Brigham Young University =

The following people have served as presidents of Brigham Young University and principals of Brigham Young Academy, which split to become Brigham Young University and Brigham Young High School in 1903. This list does not include presidents of Brigham Young University-Hawaii or Brigham Young University–Idaho.

	Name	Dates of Service
(1876-October 1903: Principals of Brigham Young Academy)
1	Warren N. Dusenberry	January 1876 – April 1876
2	Karl G. Maeser	August 1876 – January 1892
3	Benjamin Cluff	January 1892 – October 1903 (Principal of Brigham Young Academy)
3	Benjamin Cluff	October 1903 – December 1903 (President of Brigham Young University)
(As of October 1903: Presidents of Brigham Young University)
4	George H. Brimhall	April 1904 – July 1921
5	Franklin S. Harris	July 1921 – June 1945
6	Howard S. McDonald	July 1945 – October 1949
7	Ernest L. Wilkinson	February 1951 – July 1971
8	Dallin H. Oaks	August 1971 – August 1980
9	Jeffrey R. Holland	September 1980 – 1989
10	Rex E. Lee	1989 – 1995
11	Merrill J. Bateman	1996 – 2003
12	Cecil O. Samuelson, Jr.	2003 – 2014
13	Kevin J Worthen	2014 – 2023
14	C. Shane Reese	2023 –
