= Cotopaxi (company) =

Outdoor gear company

- Type: Private benefit corporation
- Industry: Apparel
- Founded: 2014; 12 years ago
- Founder: Davis Smith and Stephen Jacob
- Headquarters: Salt Lake City, Utah, U.S.
- Products: Outdoor clothing and gear
- Website: cotopaxi.com

Cotopaxi is a Salt Lake City-based outdoor gear company known for colorful, sustainably made backpacks and jackets, adorned with a llama mascot.

== History ==
Cotopaxi was founded in 2014 by Davis Smith, Stephan Jacob and CJ Whittaker. The company took its name from a volcano in Ecuador, where Smith had spent time as a child. It was certified as a B corporation in 2015.

Range Light Ventures, now known as Ridgeline Ventures, led a 2016 funding round of $11.1 million for Cotopaxi. In 2021, the company announced a funding round of $45 million, which included Bain Capital.

== Leadership ==
Smith stepped down as CEO in 2023 to serve a three-year mission for The Church of Jesus Christ of Latter-day Saints in Recife, Brazil. He was replaced by Damien Huang. Huang left in 2024 and was replaced by Lindsay Shumlas, who had been serving as chief operation officer and chief financial officer for the company.
