= Benjamin M. Ogles =

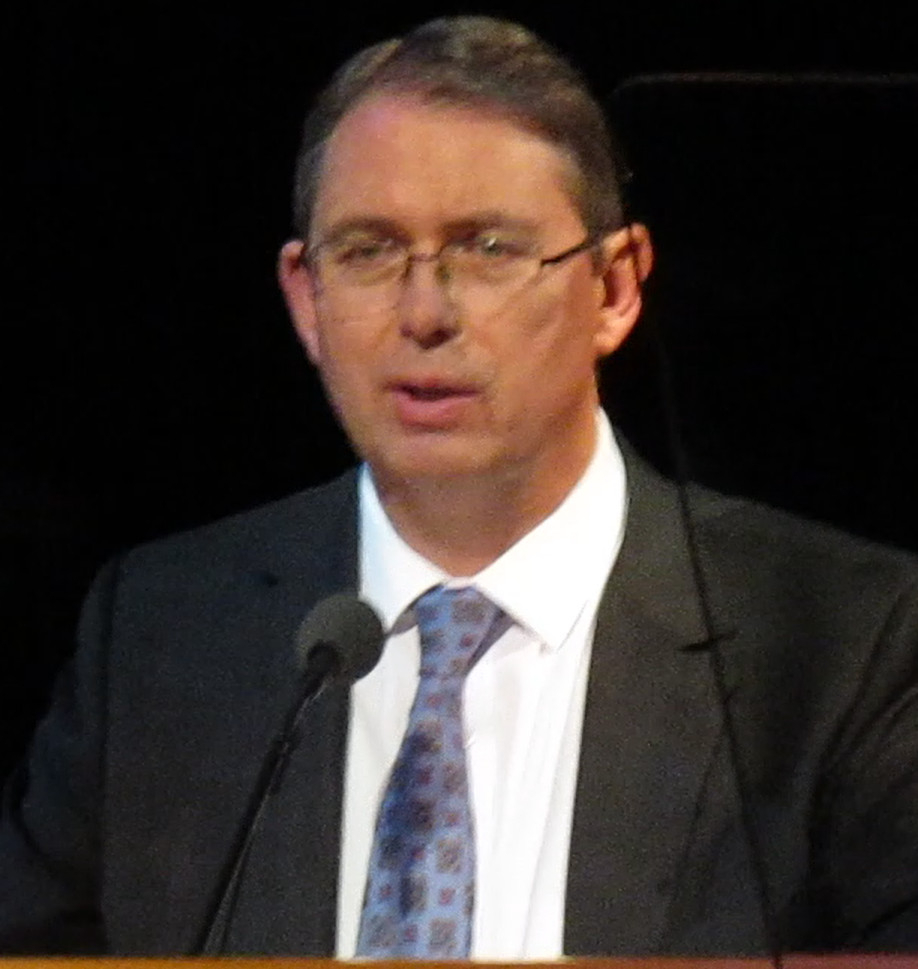
Benjamin Ogles in 2018

Benjamin M. Ogles (born 1961) was the dean of Arts and Sciences at Ohio University and became dean of the Brigham Young University (BYU) College of Family, Home and Social Sciences in July 2011.

Ogles was born in Whittier, California but raised in Brigham City, Utah from the age of five. He graduated from Box Elder High School and then attended Brigham Young University receiving his bachelor's degree in accounting. While at BYU, Ogles took two years off to serve as a missionary for the Church of Jesus Christ of Latter-day Saints in Norway.

Ogles totally switched his focus and entered a graduate program in clinical psychology at BYU. His Ph.D. advisor was Michael J. Lambert. Ogles did a clinical internship at Indiana University. He completed his Ph.D. in 1990 and that year became a professor of psychology at Ohio University. He would later serve as head of the department of psychology at Ohio University.

Publications co-authored by Ogles have appeared in the Journal of Clinical Psychology, Professional Psychology: Research and Practice and the Journal of Child and Family Studies among other publications. He was the lead author of the book Essentials in Outcome Management written with Michael J. Lambert and S. Field.

Ogles was also the lead researcher involved in producing the Ohio Youth Problems, Functioning and Satisfaction Scales.

Dr. Ogles recently coauthored the book "Common Factors Therapy: A Principle-Based Treatment Framework." Here he proposes a paradigm shift in the perception of common factors from metatheory to theoretical orientation including actionable guidelines and techniques for improving clinical practice and training.

In March 2014, Ogles was made president of the LDS Church's Provo YSA 17th Stake.

In 2020, he stepped down from his position as dean and returned to being a full-time professor.

Ogles is married to Maureen Garrett. He has seven children and eight grandchildren.
