= BYU College of Family, Home and Social Sciences =

Private college in Provo, Utah, United States

Coordinates: 40°14′53″N 111°39′04″W

The College of Family, Home, and Social Sciences
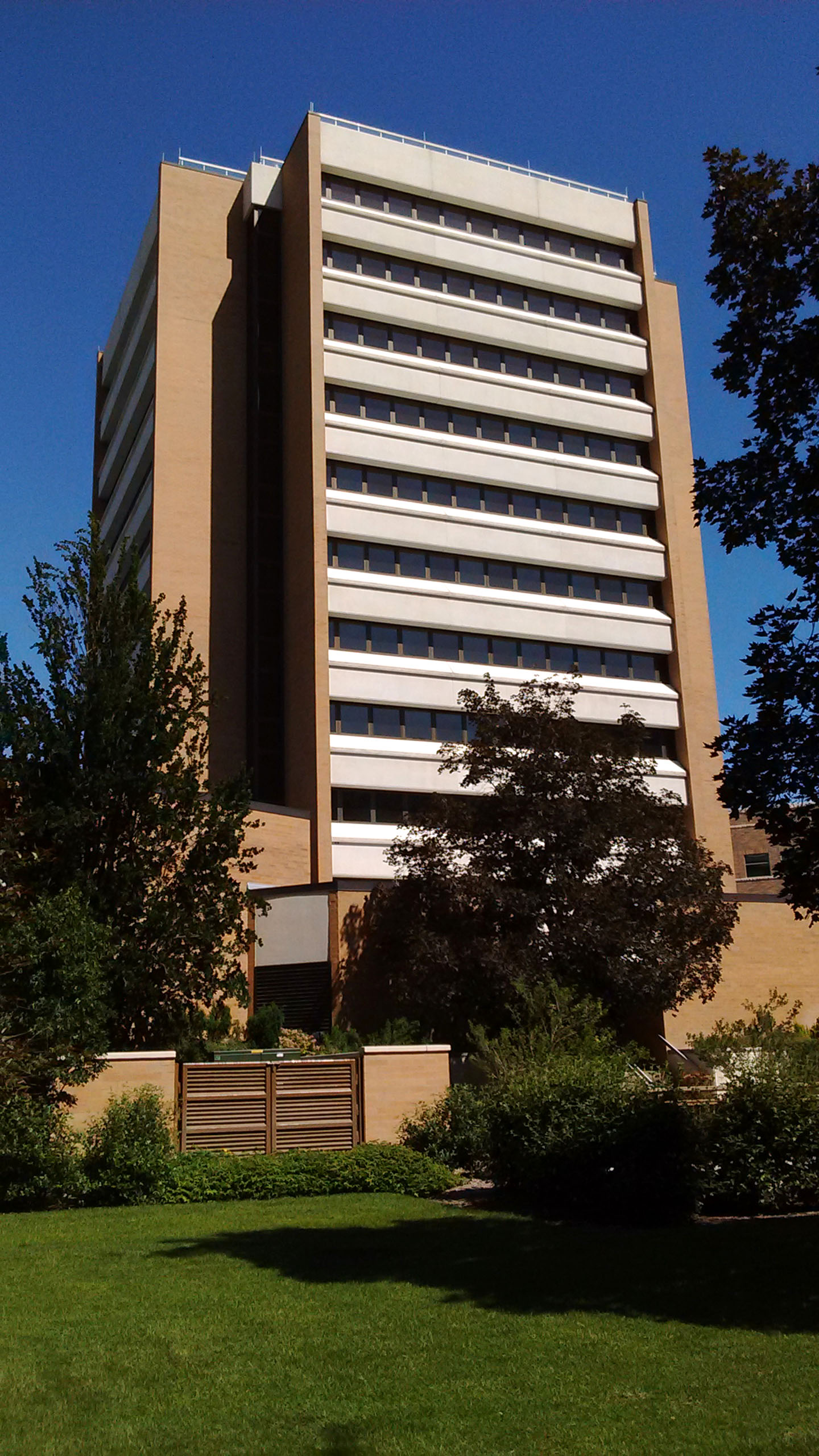
- The south side of the Spencer W. Kimball Tower, where some of the college is located
- Established: 1981
- Parent institution: Brigham Young University
- Religious affiliation: The Church of Jesus Christ of Latter-day Saints
- Dean: Laura Padilla-Walker
- Academic staff: 225
- Undergraduates: 5,100
- Postgraduates: 270
- Other students: Minors: 1,589
- Location: Provo, Utah, U.S.
- Website: socialsciences.byu.edu

The BYU College of Family, Home, and Social Sciences is a college located on the Provo, Utah campus of Brigham Young University and is housed in the Spencer W. Kimball Tower and Joseph F. Smith Building. The BYU College of Family Living was organized on June 28, 1951, while the BYU College of Social Sciences was organized in 1970. These two colleges merged to form the current college in 1981. The first dean of the college was Martin B. Hickman. The college includes nine major departments: Anthropology, Economics, Geography, History, Political Science, Psychology, the School of Family Life, Social Work, and Sociology. There are 21 different majors and 21 different minors that students can choose from, including 9 majors that have a correlating minor.

== Departments ==
=== Anthropology ===
Through a combination of classroom and field work, BYU's Anthropology Program trains students in current methods and theory while teaching them critical analysis skills necessary for many careers, including further academic work in anthropology. Departmental programs and faculty research areas focus on Sociocultural Anthropology and Archaeology. Department faculty provide a variety of opportunities for students to participate in mentored research in subjects of their interest.

Department Web Page: https://anthropology.byu.edu/

=== Economics ===
Brigham Young University's first course in economics was taught in 1895 and the Department of Economics was established in 1921. Currently, approximately 28 faculty members are housed in the department. Students study broad range of contemporary policy issues such as natural resource and environmental economics; economic development and growth; international trade and finance; economic history; the organization of industries; the development and efficiency of law; business cycles; labor markets; and public and private finance.

Department Web Page: https://economics.byu.edu/

=== Geography ===
Geography was originally part of the Geology Department, with a few geology professors teaching courses in geography. In 1955, the independent Geography Department was created, consisting of three full-time faculty, and Elliott Tuttle as chair. Today the geography department offers six major emphases: Global Studies, Environmental Studies, Travel & Tourism, Urban Planning, Geospatial Science & Technology, and Geospatial Intelligence, and five minors: Geospatial Science & Technology, Geography Teaching, Global Studies, Travel and Tourism, and Urban and Regional Planning. They have twelve full-time faculty members and a number of adjunct professors. They work with many different cities and governments on a variety of projects.

Department Web Page: https://geography.byu.edu/

=== History ===
Established in 1950, the History Department is made up of an average of 450 students and 44 faculty. It offers four majors: History, Family History- Genealogy, History Teaching, and Social Science Teaching, and four minors: History, Family History- Genealogy, History/Social Science Teaching, and Native American Studies. They offer an average of 140 classes each year including courses in African, Asian, European, Latin American, Mediterranean, Middle Eastern, and United States history. It established its first chair, the De Lamar Jensen Chair of Early Modern History, in 2017.

Department Web Page: https://history.byu.edu/

=== Political Science ===
The political science department offers a BA in political science and minors in political science, legal studies, international strategy and diplomacy, and political research and data analysis. The department has numerous affiliates, namely the Center for the Study of Elections and Democracy at BYU, the Political and Economic Development Labs, and WomanStats Project. The department also sponsors on-campus clubs, such as BYU College Democrats, BYU College Republicans, Women in Politics, Pi Sigma Alpha (Honors Society) and Tocqueville Group. Their alumni society is the BYU Political Affairs Society.

Department Web Page: https://politicalscience.byu.edu/

=== Psychology ===
The psychology program offers a bachelor's degree in psychology, a PhD in psychology, and a PhD in clinical psychology. The psychology doctoral program focuses on broad coverage of the discipline of psychology and scientific research skills during the first four semesters. The last two years of the program, students pursue specialized coursework and training in one of three emphasis areas: applied social psychology, behavioral neurobiology, or theoretical/ philosophical psychology. Students complete a master's degree as part of the program and complete a master's thesis by the end of their second year. Degrees in counseling psychology and school psychology are offered through the McKay School of Education.

Department Web Page: https://psychology.byu.edu/

=== School of Family Life ===
The School of Family Life (SFL) is one of the largest academic programs at BYU. It provides undergraduate emphases in family studies, family social services, human development, biological foundations of human development, and family and consumer sciences education, minors in family life and gerontology, and MS and PhD clinical and non-clinical programs. It also hosts several general education classes taken by a wide range of university students.

School Web Page: https://familylife.byu.edu/

=== School of Social Work ===
The BYU master of social work program offers two emphases: clinical social work and research. The social work program was ranked 104 in the nation by U.S. News & World Report in 2012 Students are required to complete two internships and most work on faculty-mentored research.

School Web Page: https://socialwork.byu.edu/

=== Sociology ===
The sociology department offers a bachelor's and master's degree. In the undergraduate program, students select their courses based on their career interests. Possible sequences to follow include research and analysis; public policy/law/criminology; family/social work/public policy; business; liberal education degree; academic sociology; and international or domestic development. The graduate program enrolls approximately two-dozen students.

Department Web Page: https://sociology.byu.edu/

== Research & academic support centers ==
In addition to the nine departments, the Family, Home, and Social Sciences oversees twelve research and academic support centers.

=== Center for Family History and Genealogy ===
Family History has a rich and long history at BYU. The Family History Program at Brigham Young University began in 1962. Various courses dedicated to genealogical research were offered, and students were able to choose either a two-year certificate or a family history minor. In addition, researchers were hired to conduct professional genealogical research for clients. The current Center for Family History and Genealogy was founded in 2000 as a place for students to engage in serious, academically rigorous genealogical/family historical research. Numerous faculty members and campus organizations participate in or supported family history on campus.

Center Web Page: https://cfhg.byu.edu/

=== Center for the Study of Elections and Democracy (CSED) ===
The Center for the Study of Elections and Democracy (CSED) at Brigham Young University was founded in 1998 as a nonpartisan academic research center seeking to increase knowledge about the practice of American democracy. CSED focuses on the production and dissemination of research that meets high academic standards, is useful to policy makers, and informs citizens. CSED-sponsored research has been published by leading academic journals and presses in the areas of campaign finance, voting technology and election reform, presidential and congressional elections, religion and politics, and democratic deliberation. CSED scholars frequently provide expert commentary on national and local politics in areas related to their research.

Center Web Page: https://csed.byu.edu/

=== Charles Redd Center for Western Studies ===
Utah ranchers Charles and Annaley Redd established the Lemuel Hardison Redd, Jr., Endowed Chair in Western American History in 1972 to promote and honor research, publication and teaching in Western American History. The center offers seventeen different awards to BYU faculty, students, and unaffiliated researchers. The Redd Center regularly sponsors public lectures to allow scholars to share research and invite the people to learn more about the Intermountain West. While the number of lectures presented each year varies, there are three annual named lectures: The Annaley Naegle Redd Lecture, held at the time of the Redd Center annual board meeting, the Howard and Hazel Butler Peters Lecture, and a lecture given by a recipient of a Clarence Dixon Taylor Award.

Center Web Page: https://reddcenter.byu.edu/

=== Child and Family Studies Laboratory ===
The Child and Family Studies Laboratory was created to train BYU students in appropriate teaching techniques for young children to be used in the home, church, and professional settings by modeling a developmentally appropriate preschool program. It provides summer, STEM, preschool, and kindergarten programs as developmentally appropriate learning experience for preschool children and their parents. The laboratory also exists to aid in, facilitate, and conduct research with your children and families.

Laboratory Web Page: https://preschool.byu.edu/

=== Comprehensive Clinic ===
The BYU Comprehensive Clinic offers counseling services for individuals, couples, and families in the Utah County community. Since the Clinic is also a research and training facility, counseling is provided by graduate student interns under the close supervision of experienced faculty who are licensed therapists. In addition to therapy, the clinic offers various psychological assessments. The building also hosts the Communication Disorders Department from the McKay School of Education, as well as LDS Family Services. Both organizations provide a wide variety of groups and counseling services and adoption services.

Clinic Web Page: https://comprehensiveclinic.byu.edu/

=== Family Studies Center ===
The Family Studies Center conducts research that identifies characteristics associated with strong marriages and families, the processes by which they develop, and positive individual and relationship outcomes of healthy family relationships. Historically, the Family Studies Center has supported funding for research on family relationships (e.g., the Flourishing Families Project), conferences on family topics (e.g., Families and Health; Work and Families), and outreach activities (e.g., “Families Under Fire” conference). The center also hosts workshops on research methods used with family data.

Center Web Page: https://familystudiescenter.byu.edu/

=== Museum of Peoples and Cultures ===
The Museum of Peoples and Cultures cares for the anthropological, archaeological, and ethnographic collections in the custody of the university. The museum provides a professional learning environment for BYU students. It also facilitates teaching and research on peoples and cultures by BYU faculty, staff, students, and by members of the scholarly community in peer institutions. The museum is open to the public to educate visitors about peoples and cultures as appropriate to the museum's holdings and collecting scope.

Museum Web Page: https://mpc.byu.edu/

=== New World Archaeological Foundation (NWAF) ===
The New World Archaeological Foundation is an archaeological research and teaching entity administered by the Department of Anthropology. The research focus is the study of the origins and subsequent trajectory of complex societies in the New World with special emphasis on Mesoamerica. Related to that study is the dissemination of findings through the NWAF Papers and other professional outlets. The NWAF also exists to enrich BYU student experience through mentoring/internship opportunities.

Foundation Web Page: https://nwaf.byu.edu/

=== Office of Public Archaeology (OPA) ===
OPA was officially organized in March 1981. OPA employs BYU Anthropology graduate students as crew chiefs and undergraduate students as crew members. External consultants are employed on an “as-needed” basis. OPA has carried out projects throughout Utah and in parts of Nevada, Wyoming, Colorado, and Arizona.

OPA has a diverse clientele, including Federal, State and local agencies, and private sector groups whose emphases include utilities construction, oil and gas exploration, mining, road construction, water projects, etc. Staff and employees have produced well over 800 technical reports and several professional articles and publications since 1981. These vary from reports on smaller projects carried out by individuals, to much larger excavations or survey projects involving large crews and extensive field and laboratory work.

=== Civic engagement ===
The mission of the Office of Civic Engagement is to provide students and faculty with appropriate skills and meaningful opportunities to engage in their respective communities. It contributes to undergraduate education by providing specific training in leadership and organizational skills as well as practical hands-on opportunities. It helps students acquire an understanding of the practical application of civic engagement and glean valuable lessons from participating and leading civic engagement projects.

Office Web Page: https://civicengagement.byu.edu/

=== American heritage ===
The American Heritage Center oversees a general education course by the same name that all students must take to graduate. BYU's board of trustees created the idea of American heritage over 25 years ago because they believed that university students needed a better understanding of the origins of the Constitution and its role in American life. The course draws heavily from three different disciplines: political science, economics and history. The goal of the course is to teach students the religious, historical, political and economic origins of the Constitution, how the Constitution works, and to apply their knowledge of the Constitution to analyze major historical, political, and economic issues.

Center Web Page: https://americanheritage.byu.edu/

=== FHSS Research Support Center ===
The Research Support Center assists and educates students and teachers in the College of Family Home and Social Sciences in implementing and improving research and statistical procedures. they offer face-to-face and over the phone consultation. They provide instruction in using statistical programs like SPSS and Stata to calculate summary information and perform simple statistical analysis.

Center Web Page: https://fhssrsc.byu.edu/

== History ==
The College of Family Living was led by director, Royden C. Braithwaite, and from 1955 to 1981, by deans Marion C. Pfund, Jack B. Trunnell, Virginia F. Cutler, and Blaine R. Porter. The educational aim of the College of Family Living was to prepare students for homemaking, for jobs related to homemaking, and to support and enhance family life within their communities. The departments in the college were: Clothing and Textiles, Economics and Management of the Home, Food and Nutrition, Homemaking Education, Housing Design, Human Development and Family Relationships, Housing and Home Management, Family Life Education, Child Development and Family Relationships, Home Economics Education, Environmental Design, Family Economics and Home Management, Food Science and Nutrition, Interior Design, Family Studies, Interior Environment, and Family Resource Management.

The College of Social Sciences was led by deans John T. Bernhard from 1966 to 1970 and Martin B. Hickman from 1970 to 1981. Previously, it was a part of the College of Humanities and Social Sciences. The departments within the College of Social Sciences were: Anthropology and Archaeology, Asian Studies, Economics, Geography, History, International Relations, Political Science, Psychology, Russian Studies and Sociology, and Government.

In 1981, the College of Family Living and the College of Social Sciences merged to form the College of Family, Home, and Social Sciences with Martin Hickman as the founding dean. The following have served as deans for the College of Family, Home, and Social Sciences:

- Laura Padilla-Walker 2021–Present
- Ben Ogles 2011–2021

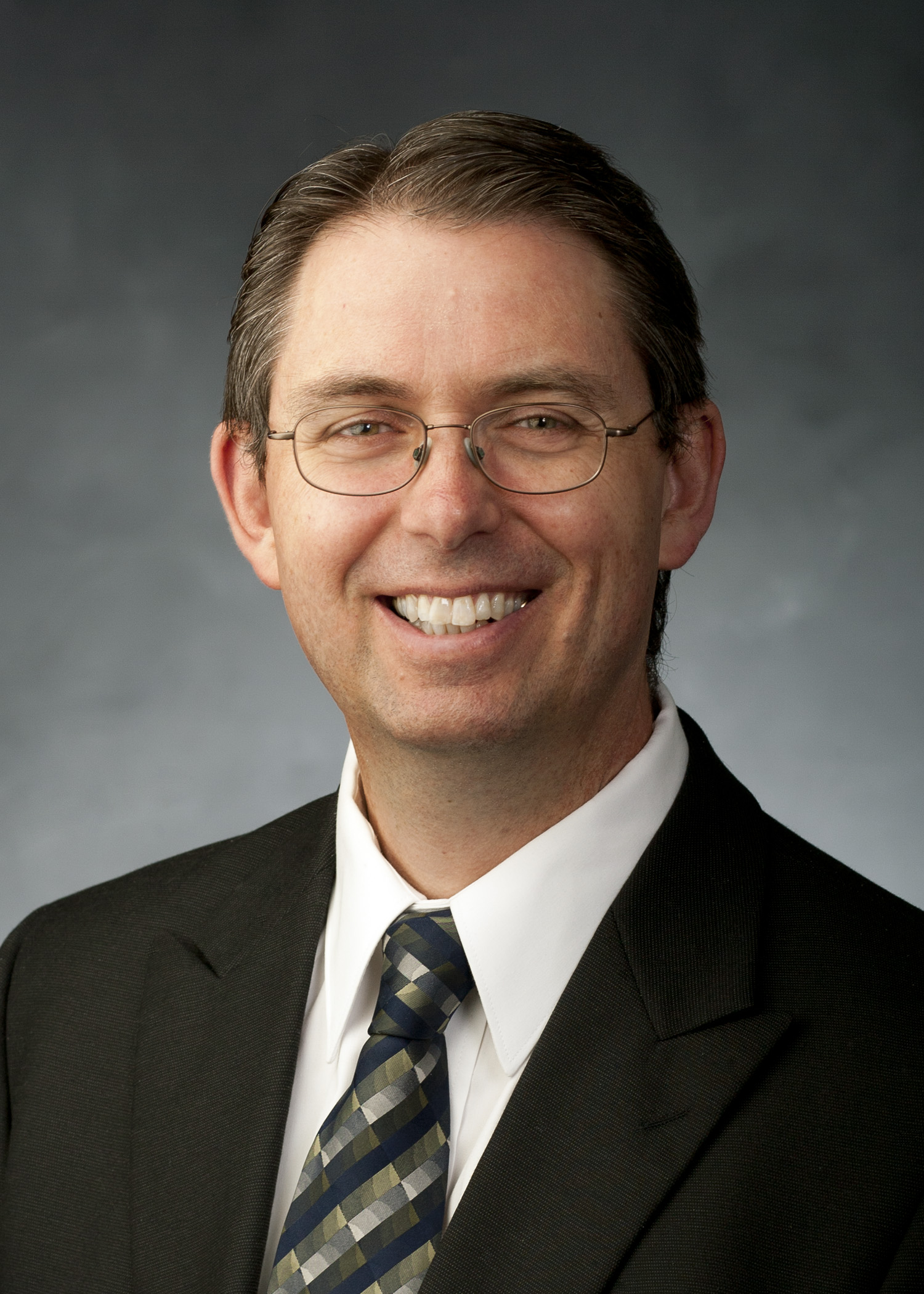

- David B. Magleby 2001 – 2011

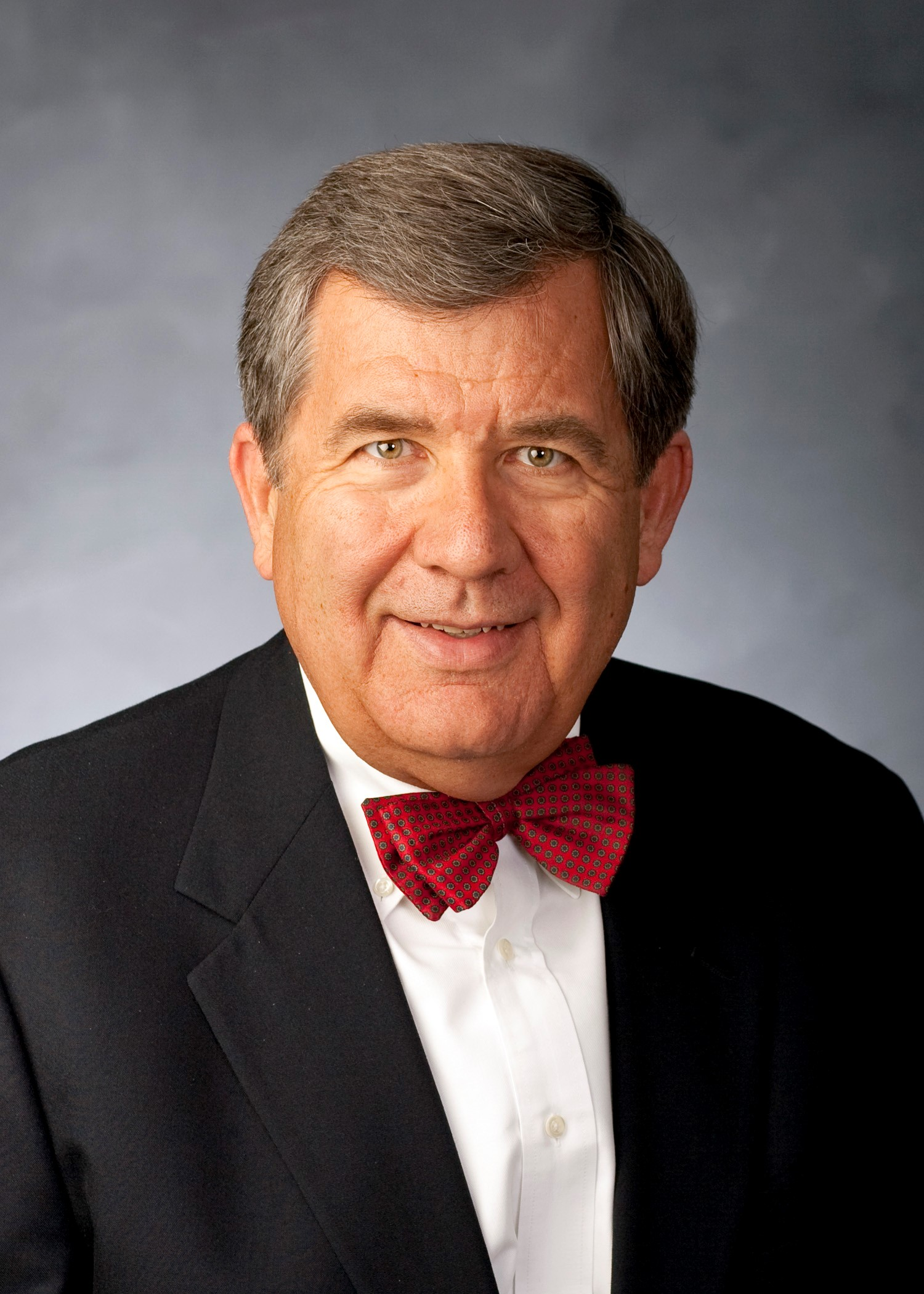

- Clayne L. Pope 1993 – 2001

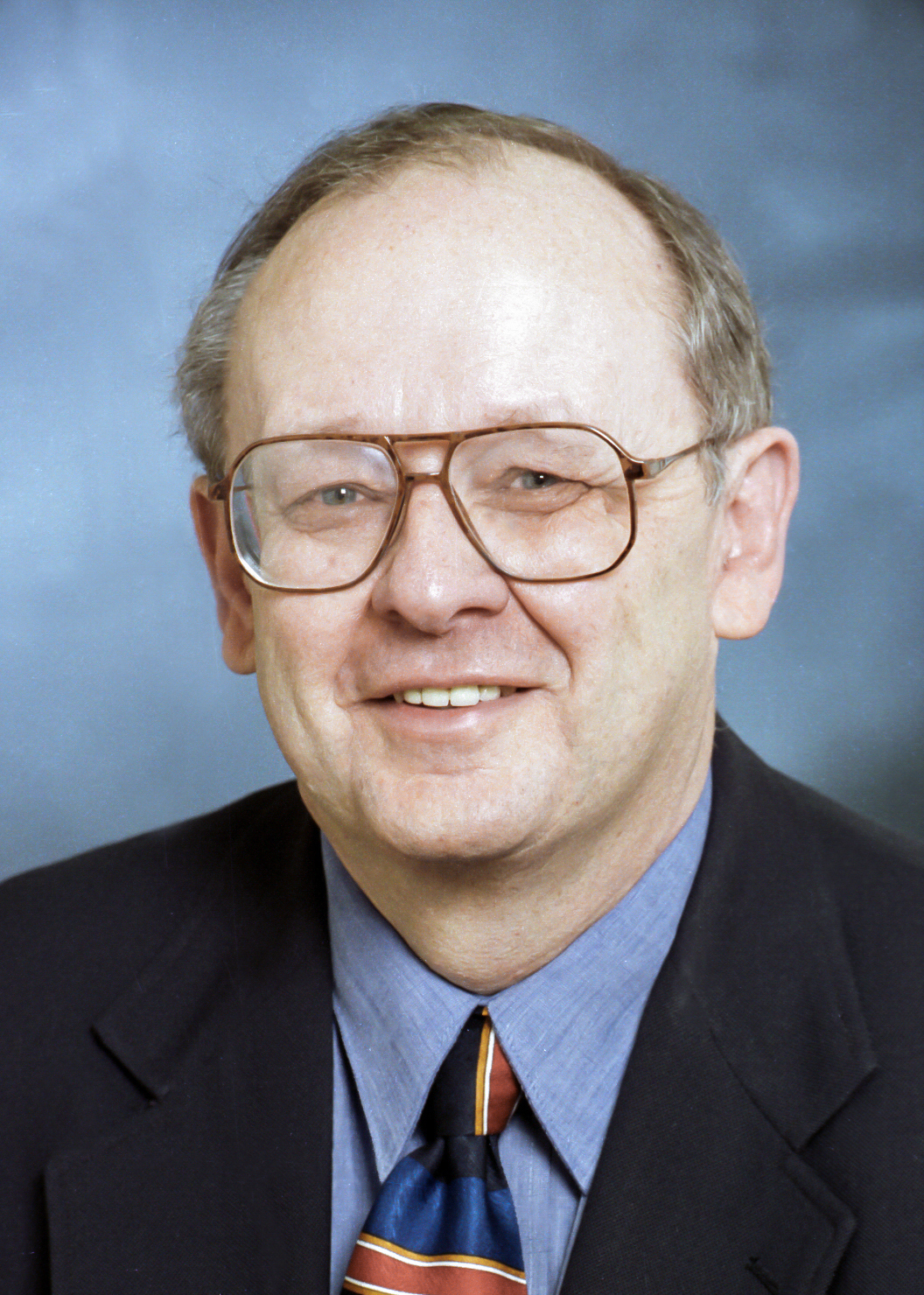

- Donovan E. Fleming 1989 – 1993

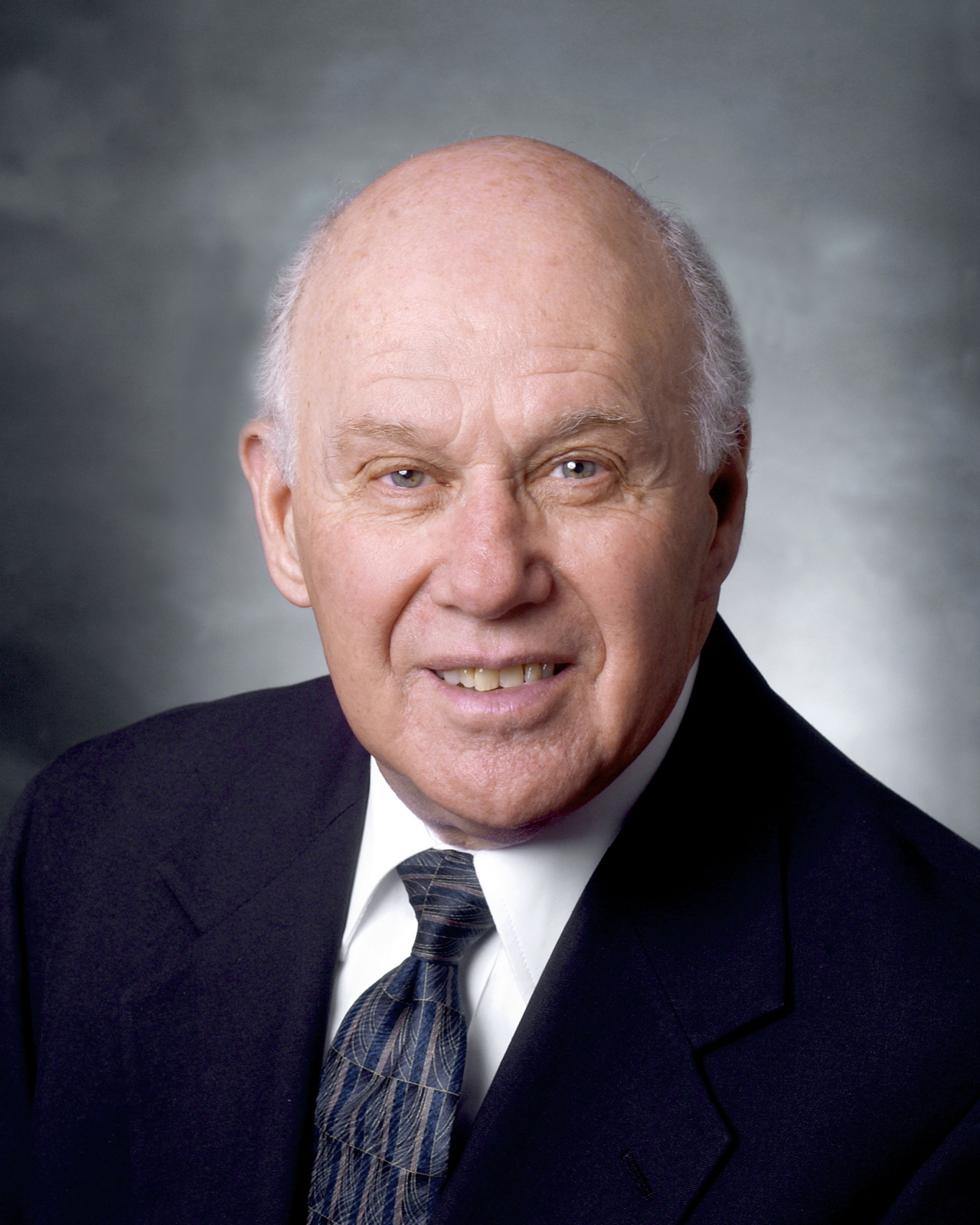

- Stan L. Albrecht 1986 – 1989

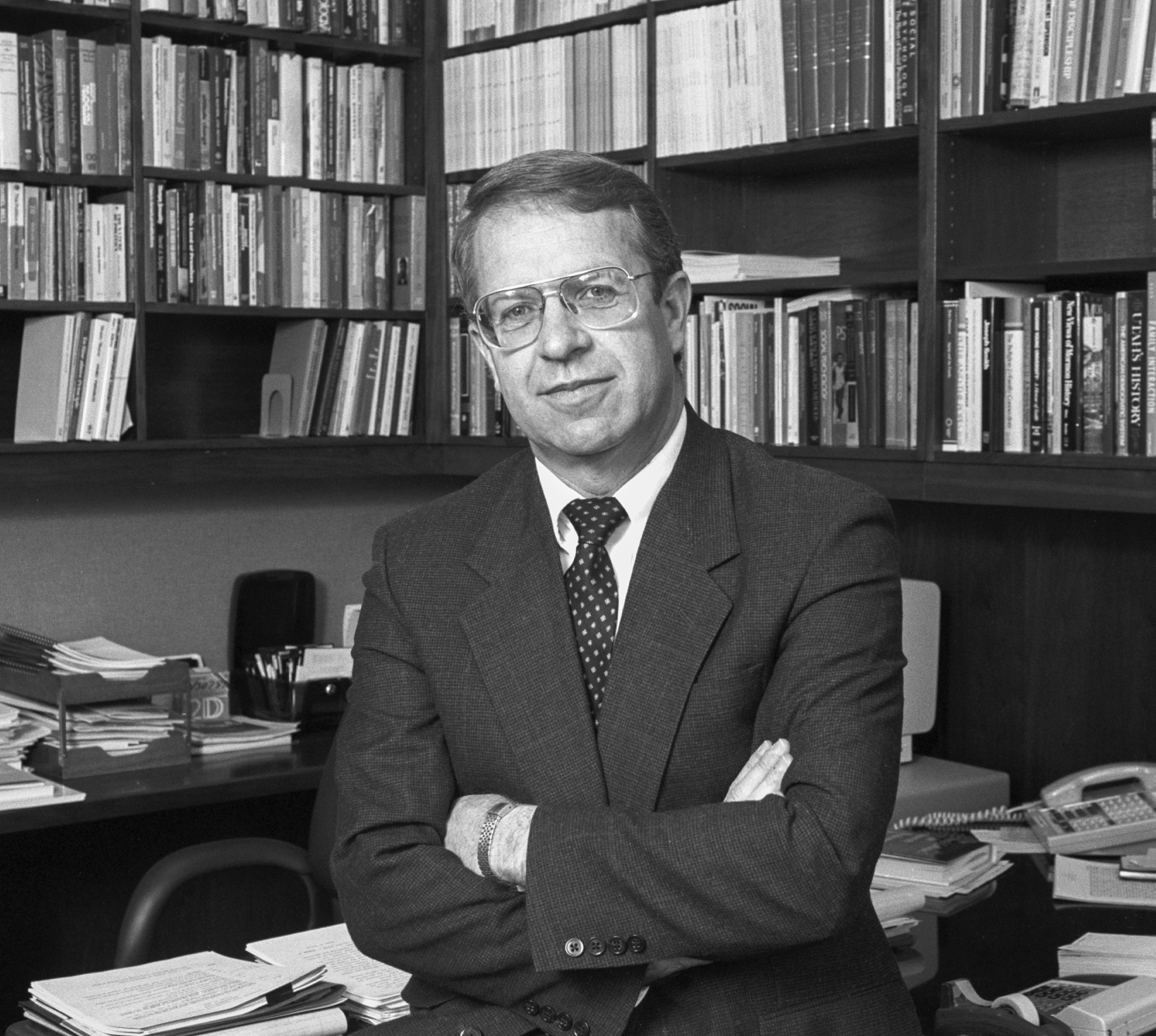

- Martin B. Hickman 1981 – 1989

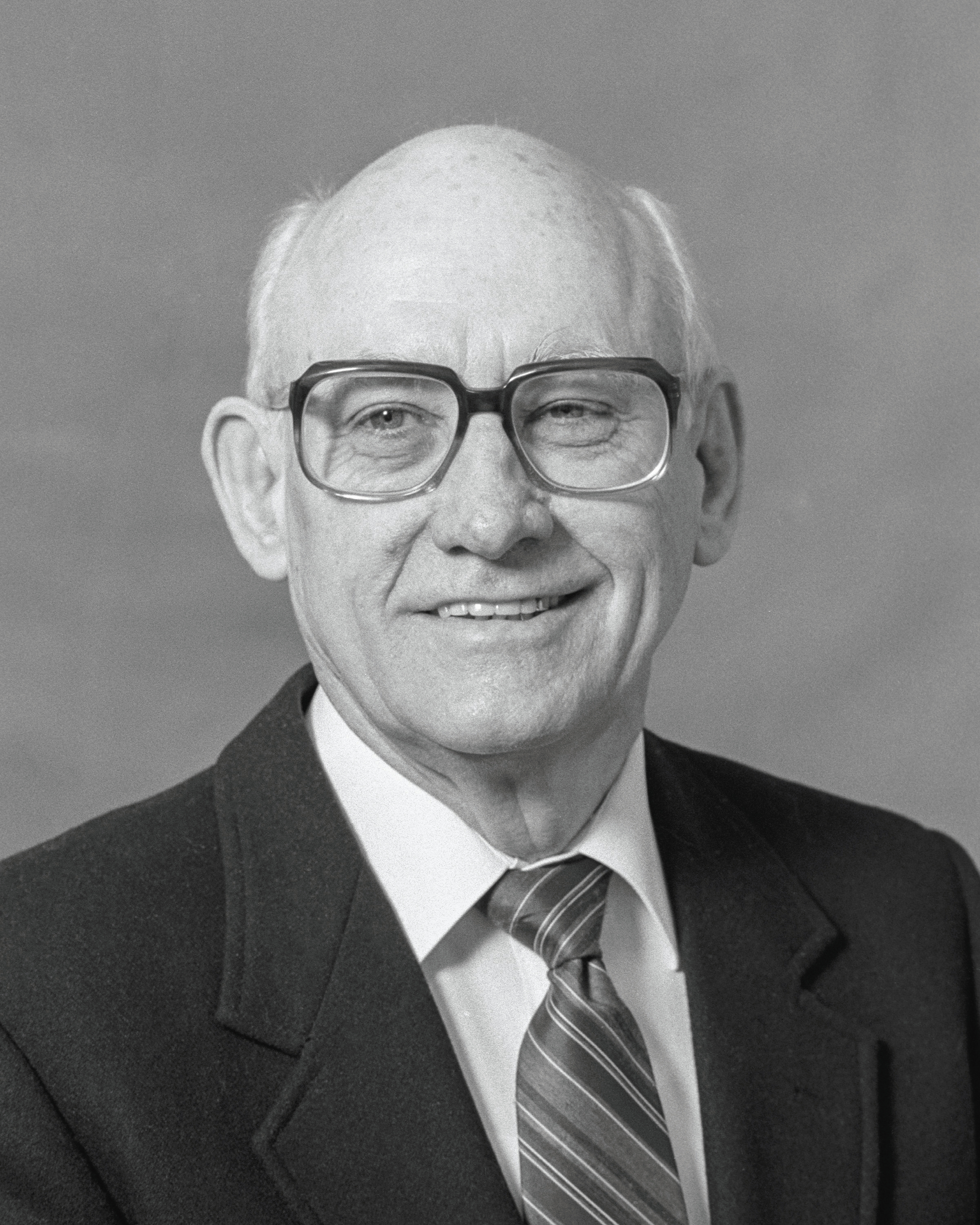

== Endowed chairs ==
The College of Family, Home, and Social Sciences has four specific endowed chairs.

=== Mary Lou Fulton Chair ===
The Fulton Chair supports causes and programs that uphold and strengthen the family unit. Mary Lou was particularly sensitive to helping others remain free of addictive substances or crippling afflictions that limit their possibilities in life. She understood the importance of preparing future families for success by educating youth about principles that foster strong, eternal family relationships. The Mary Lou Fulton Chair in the College of Family, Home, and Social Sciences stands as a tribute to her life of service, to high values, and to family.

=== Camilla Eyring Kimball Chair ===
The purposes of the Camilla Eyring Kimball Chair are to support professorships for faculty in the College of Family, Home, and Social Sciences who have made distinguished professional contributions to strengthen home and family. Visiting scholars who come to BYU to share their expertise regarding home and family to faculty, students, and the community. Research and scholarship at BYU with a home and family focus.

=== Marjorie Pay Hinckley Chair ===
The Marjorie Pay Hinckley Endowed Chair In Social Work and the Social Sciences honors Sister Hinckley's commitment to strengthening home and family. The chair enriches the educational and professional lives of students and faculty in the College of Family Home and Social Sciences as they strive to alleviate problems faced by individuals and families worldwide.

=== Lemuel Hardison Redd, Jr. Chair ===
The Lemuel Hardison Redd, Jr. Chair in Western American history was established in 1972 by Charles and Annaley Redd, prominent Utah ranchers and philanthropists, to promote and honor research, publication and teaching in western American history. The chair was named in honor of the father of Charlie Redd, who settled and developed Latter-day Saint communities in the slickrock desert of southeastern Utah and established a sprawling livestock empire.

== Prominent alumni ==
Some of the college's prominent alumni include senators Mitt Romney, Orrin Hatch, and Jeff Flake. Entertainer David Archuleta briefly attended the university to study psychology. Former BYU President Kevin J Worthen graduated with a degree in political science.

Other prominent alumni include Neil L. Anderson, Member of the Quorum of the Twelve Apostles of the Church of Jesus Christ of Latter-day Saints, who graduated in 1975 with a bachelor's degree in economics. Todd Christensen, former tight end for the NFL's Oakland Raiders and New York Giants, winner of Super Bowl XV in 1981, and former ESPN commentator for 23 years, graduated with a degree in social work in 1978. Steve Sarkisian, former head football coach at the University of Southern California, earned his bachelor's degree in sociology from BYU in 1997. And Marc Wilson, quarterback for the NFL's Oakland Raiders, Greenbay Packers, and New England Patriots, and a consensus All-American in 1979, received a bachelor's degree in economics from BYU in 1980.

== In the news ==
In 2016, research from family life professor Sarah M. Coyne found that Disney Princess culture magnifies stereotypes in young girls. Family life professor Larry Nelson lead a study that found that individuals who use problematic media (violent video games, gambling, pornography) become more withdrawn over the course of a year. Family life professor Sarah M. Coyne found that children who frequently engage with superhero culture are more likely to be physically and relationally aggressive one year later.

In 2017, School of Family Life assistant professor Alex Jensen revealed that the perception of favoritism may have more effect on a child-parent relationship than was previously considered.

In 2019, Adam Rogers, professor of family life, found that many adolescents do not have the cognitive skills and resources to competently deal with the challenging aspects of relationships. Erin K. Holmes, Jeremy B. Yorgason, E. Jeffrey Hill & David B. Allsop collaborated on research implicating that better relationships with your partner come when both partners feeling empowered and exhibit trust, especially in the financial process. Matt Easton, the college valedictorian, came out as homosexual during his valedictory address to the college. Study was done by Laura Padilla-Walker, Daye Son, and Larry J. Nelson investigating different profiles of helicopter parenting in conjunction with parental psychological control and parental warmth. Researchers at BYU found that how individuals perceive the space (too crowded or too spread out) in their homes has more of an effect on family functioning than actual characteristics, such as the size of the house or number of bedrooms. BYU economics professor Arden Pope collaborated in research that showed significant human health benefits when air quality is better than the current national ambient air quality standard. Research led by Sarah Coyne, a professor of family life at Brigham Young University, found that the amount of time spent on social media is not directly increasing anxiety or depression in teenagers.

In 2020, Julianne Holt-Lunstad, a world-renowned expert on the influence of social relationships on physical health, used her research to help the audiences of Science, The New Yorker, The Atlantic, The New York Times, The Guardian, Insider, NPR, and other media outlets recognize the importance of staying socially connected while being physically distant. Sarah Coyne lead a six-year study, the longest study ever done on video game addiction, that found that about 90% of gamers do not play in a way that is harmful or causes negative long-term consequences. Political science professor Michael Barber, co-authored a paper in which research found that vote-by-mail does not give either U.S. political party an edge in races. BYU's Counseling and Psychological Services, in the largest study of its kind to date, found that internet-delivered cognitive-based therapy worked just as well as in-person therapy for those with mild to moderate symptoms.

In 2021, in the longest study to date on the effects of social media on teens, BYU research found a correlation between time spent on social media and suicidality risk among teenage girls. The Brigham Young University Record Linking Lab developed one of the first data sets of each individual who died in the 1918 pandemic by extracting the cause of death from death certificates, allowing researchers to better understand the best strategies to combat viral spread over time. BYU professor of political science Jeremy Pope studied the delegates of the Constitutional Convention and found that fathers who had more sons were more likely to vote for a stronger national government than fathers of daughters, who wanted a weaker national government and greater state authority. BYU's Center for Family History and Genealogy teamed up with the University of Washington to trace cancer-causing variants back to common ancestors to prevent hereditary cancer. Psychology professor Chad Jensen found that using a cell phone in 'Night Shift' will not help a user fall or stay asleep. Professors Timothy Smith and Julianne Holt-Lunstad found that interpersonal relationships are key parts of medical treatment plans and help patients reduce stress and live longer. And in the longest study to date on the impact of princess media on consumers, new research from BYU professor Sarah Coyne found that children who engaged with princess culture were more likely to later hold progressive views about women and subscribe less to attitudes of hegemonic masculinity.
