= Laura Padilla-Walker =

American professor of developmental psychology

Laura M Padilla-Walker is an American developmental psychologist and academic administrator. She is a professor in the School of Family Life at Brigham Young University. She was an associate dean for the BYU College of Family, Home and Social Sciences from 2017-2021 until she became the dean in July 2021.

== Early life, education, and career ==
Padilla-Walker received her bachelor's degree from Central Michigan University in 1999, and both her master's (2001) and PhD. (2005) in developmental psychology from the University of Nebraska–Lincoln. Her thesis was " Perceived appropriateness and accurate perception of parental messages as predictors of adolescents' internalization of values and behaviors".

== Publications ==
=== Books ===
- Padilla-Walker, Laura M., and Gustavo Carlo., editors. Prosocial Development: A Multidimensional Approach. Oxford: Oxford University Press 2016. ISBN 9780199964772

=== Most cited journal articles ===
- Padilla-Walker LM, Nelson LJ. Black hawk down?: Establishing helicopter parenting as a distinct construct from other forms of parental control during emerging adulthood. Journal of Adolescence. 2012 Oct 1;35(5):1177-90. (Cited 500 times, according to Google Scholar) '
- Carroll JS, Padilla-Walker LM, Nelson LJ, Olson CD, McNamara Barry C, Madsen SD. Generation XXX: Pornography acceptance and use among emerging adults. Journal of adolescent research. 2008 Jan;23(1):6-30. (Cited 775 times, according to Google Scholar.)
- Coyne SM, Padilla-Walker LM, Howard E. Emerging in a digital world: A decade review of media use, effects, and gratifications in emerging adulthood. Emerging Adulthood. 2013 Jun;1(2):125-37. (Cited 313 times, according to Google Scholar.)

Day RD, Padilla-Walker LM. Mother and father connectedness and involvement during early adolescence. Journal of Family Psychology. 2009 Dec;23(6):900. (Cited 278 times, according to Google Scholar.)

- Padilla‐Walker LM, Christensen KJ. Empathy and self‐regulation as mediators between parenting and adolescents' prosocial behavior toward strangers, friends, and family. Journal of Research on Adolescence. 2011 Sep;21(3):545-51.(Cited 243 times, according to Google Scholar.)

Padilla-Walker has over 100 journal publications and has co-edited three volumes with Oxford University Press.

== Awards and achievements ==
In 2010, Padilla-Walker received the Camilla Eyring Kimball Professorship from 2019 to 2024
