= Academic freedom at Brigham Young University =

Academic freedom at Brigham Young University (BYU) has been the subject of several controversies, mostly focusing on its religious nature. In 1992, BYU issued a statement limiting academic freedom in certain areas, including language that attacked the Church of Jesus Christ of Latter-day Saints (LDS Church), and language that violates the university's honor code.

Since this statement was released, BYU has received continued accreditation from the Northwest Commission on Colleges and Universities, which specifically approved of the statement, as it was typical of many religious institutions. In 1997, the American Association of University Professors (with a membership of about 47,000) criticized BYU based on the wording of the new statement, as well as then-recent controversies involving several professors allegedly denied their academic rights. The cases of professors Cecilia Konchar Farr, David Knowlton and Gail T. Houston were among the more notable controversies, although BYU has stated that these professors' discharge was based on issues other than academic speech.

James D. Gordon III, one of the key administrators in the 1990s issues, has stated that in addition to the individual academic freedom of faculty, a university has institutional academic freedom ("the freedom of a college or university to pursue its mission and to be free from outside control"), grounded in the free speech clause of the First Amendment and recognized by the United States Supreme Court. Dean Gordon pointed out that the AAUP recognized this in a 1940 statement, which provides that "Limitations of academic freedom because of religious or other aims of the institution should be clearly stated in writing..."

== Academic freedom issues ==
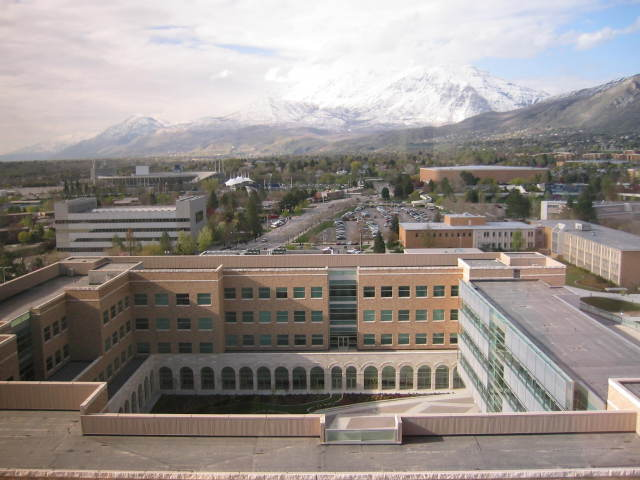
Looking North from the Kimball Tower toward Mount Timpanogos

=== University standards ===
In a 1971 speech to a BYU faculty group, Martin B. Hickman, then the dean of BYU's College of Social Sciences, argued that the decision to join the BYU faculty reflected an acceptance of the values of the university and thus anyone who joined the faculty with this proper mindset would not have any academic freedom issues while there.

In 1992, BYU drafted a new Statement on Academic Freedom. After receiving comment from faculty and others, the document was implemented on September 14, 1992. This document specified that: "Because the gospel encompasses all truth and affirms the full range of human modes of knowing, the scope of integration for LDS scholars is, in principle, as wide as truth itself." However, citing BYU's role as a religious institution, the document allowed limitations to be placed upon "expression with students or in public that:

1. contradicts or opposes, rather than analyzes or discusses, fundamental Church doctrine or policy;
2. deliberately attacks or derides the Church or its general leaders; or
3. violates the Honor Code because the expression is dishonest, illegal, unchaste, profane, or unduly disrespectful of others.

"...The ultimate responsibility to determine harm to the University mission or the church, however, remains vested in the University's governing bodies—including the University president and central administration and, finally, the board of Trustees."

Also in 1992, BYU began including a clause in its faculty contracts requiring Latter-day Saint faculty to "accept the spiritual and temporal expectations of wholehearted Church membership". In 1993, contracts further required Latter-day Saint faculty to "maintain standards of conduct consistent with qualifying for temple privileges" (referring to entry into LDS Church temples, for which one must meet standards of activity and behavior in the LDS Church). In 1996, Latter-day Saint faculty were required, as a condition of employment, to obtain the yearly endorsement of their local ecclesiastical leaders certifying that the faculty were temple-worthy.

BYU does not allow off-campus groups to use the campus for protests or demonstrations. On-campus groups and students must apply for a permit.

=== Northwest Association ===
In 1996, the Northwest Association of Schools and of Colleges and Universities (Northwest Association) reviewed BYU's academic freedom statement and renewed its accreditation. The Northwest Association specifically approved BYU's academic freedom statement. Such accreditation standards permit "religious colleges and universities to place limitations on academic freedom so long as they publish those limitations candidly." In addition, the Northwest Association investigated "almost all" of the allegations that the AAUP had asserted regarding other individuals, concluding that the university had not violated academic freedom.

=== American Association of University Professors ===
BYU's academic freedom policies have been criticized by the American Association of University Professors (AAUP). In 1997, they issued a report documenting the cases of several professors, concluding "that infringements on academic freedom are distressingly common and that the climate for academic freedom is distressingly poor."

The AAUP report also contained, as an appendix, a response authored by the BYU administration, which argued that BYU had the right to limit academic freedom in order to preserve the religious character of the school, a right implied by a 1940 AAUP statement and generally followed until 1970. In particular, BYU compared itself to Gonzaga University, a Jesuit institution which prohibited "open espousal of viewpoints which contradict explicit principles of Catholic faith and morals."

BYU also stated that the academic freedom judgement process lacked transparency and objectivity. The AAUP's decision remained, however. In 1965, the AAUP had stated that "satisfactory conditions of academic freedom and tenure now prevail at Gonzaga."

In 1970, the AAUP had adopted a statement of Interpretive Comments in which the AAUP had stated, "Most church-related institutions no longer need or desire the departure from the principle of academic freedom implied in the 1940 Statement, and we do not endorse such a departure". In 1998, the AAUP voted to censure BYU, which remains on a list of censured institutions together with 46 other universities.

The AAUP's refusal to accommodate religiously affiliated institutions of higher learning in connection with desires to protect religious traditions in line with its own 1940 statement - in contrast to that accommodation by the Northwest Association - has been criticized.

=== Case studies ===
Soon after adopting their statement on academic freedom in 1992, BYU took actions which some have viewed as related to the implementation of the new academic freedom policy. For example, in late 1992, BYU's board of trustees vetoed without comment a BYU proposal to invite Pulitzer Prize winner and Harvard University professor Laurel Thatcher Ulrich, an active feminist, to address the annual BYU Women's Conference. Since then, Ulrich has been invited and spoken at BYU, including as recently as 2017.

In some cases since 1992, BYU has dismissed, denied continuing status, or censured faculty members who have taken critical positions relating to official LDS Church policy or leadership, as well as those who did not pay a tithe to the LDS Church for personal reasons.

In 1993, BYU revoked the continuing status to Cecilia Konchar Farr, who had publicly advocated a pro-choice position on abortion. Farr was hired as an English instructor and some felt her positions of pro-choice were irrelevant to her assignment with the school. David Knowlton, who had discussed the church's missionary system at an independent Mormon forum, as well as making disparaging remarks about LDS architecture, did not have his contract renewed. Officially, BYU spokespeople generally framed the actions in the cases of Farr, Knowlton, and Houston as relating to the quality of the professors' scholarship, and sometimes to unspecified misbehavior, rather than the controversial content of the affected professor's academic activities.

In 1996, BYU dismissed Gail T. Houston, an English professor, despite positive votes from her English Department and the College Committee. One of the reasons for this action was her advocacy of prayer to Heavenly Mother. Also in 1996, professor Brian Evenson resigned in protest after receiving a warning from BYU administration over some violent images in one of his short stories. Nevertheless, some critics viewed these dismissals as a kind of purge. Some of the professors dismissed for academic reasons claim that their publishing credentials were stronger than many of their colleagues.

In 2006, part-time faculty instructor Jeffrey Nielsen's contract was not renewed after he wrote an op-ed piece in the June 4 Salt Lake Tribune which criticized and opposed the LDS Church's stance on same-sex marriage. Darron Smith, an African-American, taught a course called "The African American Experience" from 1996 to 2006, when his adjunct faculty contract was not renewed. According to Smith, his termination was a direct response to his criticism of how the LDS Church has treated black people.

In 2011, BYU placed physics professor Steven E. Jones on paid leave in connection with an internal investigation that a paper he authored on the causes finding that the World Trade Center towers fell on 9/11 because of pre-set explosives might not have met "scientific standards of peer review" and his failure of "appropriately distancing himself" from the university in his statements regarding his explosive theory. Mr. Jones accepted early retirement while the investigation was in its early stages.

In February 2012, Randy L. Bott made controversial racial statements that appeared in The Washington Post where Bott pointed to a passage in Mormon scripture that suggested to him that Cain's descendants were marked with dark skin and were prohibited from holding the priesthood. These statements were censured or condemned by BYU Administrators and the LDS Church, and the Professor retired from BYU shortly thereafter.

In 2021, the Salt Lake Tribune noted the tension between faith and scholarship, reviewing how BYU had navigated that tension over time (such as openly teaching evolution), and stating that a recent call to support church doctrines had the effect of "some professors worrying about what they might teach, write, or research."

In 2023, Daniel Frost, a BYU professor, argued in Public Square Magazine that BYU enriches academia by seeking truth in the light of its specific religious beliefs, allowing "its scholars and students to pursue questions that would not be tolerated or supported at other universities."
