= Brigham Young University Student Service Association =

Brigham Young University Student Association
- Abbreviation: BYUSA
- Formation: 1988
- President: Sarah Sun
- Vice President: Tala Alnasser
- Website: byusa.byu.edu

The Brigham Young University Student Service Association (BYUSA) is the official student association at Brigham Young University (BYU), located in Provo, Utah. Student government appeared at BYU as early as the 1900s. Throughout its existence, the student government took different forms. Up until 1933, the student government association was known as the student body, after which it was known as the Associated Students of Brigham Young University (ASBYU). During its early history the student body sought to provide students with campus events and forms of entertainment for its students; however, with the transition to ASBYU, the organization sought to not only provide for the social life of students but also seek to advocate for their needs. The structure of modern BYUSA includes a president and executive vice-president as well as four area vice-presidents in charge of a distinct sect of BYUSA which include Experiences, Clubs, Student Advisory Council, and Student Honor.

Throughout its history, the BYU's student government and its administration have frequently clashed. Sometimes finding themselves underneath the control of BYU administration and prominent leaders of the Church of Jesus Christ of Latter-day Saints serving on the Board of Trustees, the student body leadership often attempted to reorganize or protest in order to assert their desire to affect policy at BYU. BYUSA was reorganized and rechartered in 1988, while Jeffrey R. Holland was the university president. Following their rechartering, BYUSA reevaluated their role at BYU, seeking to emulate their motto "students serving students" by focusing their attention as a student government on advisement and service. A prominent controversy surrounding BYUSA and BYU administration revolved around the firing of a BYUSA faculty advisor for writing a letter to the school newspaper, asking for more transparency in BYUSA elections which led to student protestation of the firing and the call for more freedom for students to express opinions. In the 1990s and the 2000s, BYUSA made university history by electing its first female president in 1991 and its first African-American president in 2002.

== History ==
The organization of student government at BYU can be traced to the early 1900s. According to Brigham Young University: The First One Hundred Years, the student government organization officially began in 1909. However, according to Brigham Young University: A House of Faith, student government began in December 1902. Regardless of the discrepancy, a de facto student government existed at BYU as early as 1899 with the establishment of the first student newspaper at BYU, White and Blue. While, not an official student government, the newspaper used their influence to establish student policies. Until 1933, the student government association was known by the title the "student body", after which it was known as ASBYU. During the university presidency of Franklin S. Harris, ASBYU ran with little supervision from administration or faculty. In 1937, the Board of Control, made up of administration chosen student members, was dissolved and students were granted permission to hold primary elections, however, students continued to notice the lack of student government's power for the next 20 years. Early duties of student government included running intercollegiate athletics, managing the Student Loan Fund, operating the BYU bookstore, planning campus social activities, maintaining the paint on the "Y" on the mountainside near BYU, and overseeing freshman initiation.

The ASBYU senate was more outspoken than other student government branches but was frequently censored by the administration. For example, in 1958, senate members proposed a "dead week" before final exams with no university activities; however, administrators compelled ASBYU members to schedule activities anyway so students would not be forced to travel off-campus for "less desirable recreation". Administration pushed back on the senate led by BYU president Ernest L. Wilkinson who reminded students that the university was "private...not a republic" and that it was "ludicrous" to think students could affect university policy. From the 1950s to the 1970s, interest in student government was on a steady decline due to the creation of local religious organizations that became the new social units for students. Additionally, interest in ASBYU had decreased because students began to identify with their major rather than their class in school. Despite its declining interest, ASBYU funded and helped organize many campus events and improve student and BYU relations. Throughout the history of ASBYU, student body officials had been forced to resign due to moral or legal violations which included public "lewdness", embezzlement, and unauthorized use of university vehicles among other violations. Consequently, some students suggested that student officers be appointed by local ecclesiastical leaders rather than elected. President of BYU Dallin H. Oaks argued that it was important for students to experienced the democratic system and ecclesiastical appointment of leadership was never implemented.

In 1988, ASBYU was restructured and renamed BYUSA by BYU president Jeffrey R. Holland. According to the director of the Honor Code Office, Rush Sumpter, ASBYU became too powerful with students believing they "could do their own thing". Additionally, Sumpter stated that elections became exclusive to wealthy students who could afford to campaign, social clubs had too much control, and activities excluded students. John Coleman became the new president of BYUSA with advisement and service rather than power, being the focus of the government modeled institution. Despite being the equivalent of a student government, the association claims to function as a student service association, because students work with administration to solve problems rather than have the power to make direct change. The name was initially changed to the Student Service Association of Brigham Young University (SSABYU) but was changed to BYUSA due to potential abuse of the acronym.

In 1991, Amy Baird was elected the first female president of BYUSA. In 2002, Rob Foster became the first African-American BYUSA president, the Daily Herald noted this as significant, because African-Americans make up less than 1% of enrollment at BYU. In 2006, controversy surrounding BYU's administration of BYUSA was heightened when Todd Hendricks, a BYUSA advisor, was fired from the university. The Daily Herald reported that Hendricks was fired for submitting a letter to the school's newspaper The Daily Universe which urged for more transparency in BYUSA elections. The firing led to student protests and concern that BYU administration had too much control over student government. A mostly silent student protest was held on March 31, 2006 where students protested the firing of Hendricks and the lack of freedom for students to express their opinions. In 2016, the first all-female presidency of BYUSA was elected with Avery Harding as president and Addie Hulme as vice-president. BYUSA instituted PEN talk panels (Perspective Education Narratives), modeled off TED talks, to allow BYU students a safe place to discuss various topics with the goal of better understanding minority groups at BYU.

== Organization ==
BYUSA functions to serve and advise. Every March full-time students participate in electing a new president and executive vice president to a one-year term. Candidates for president and executive vice president must be in good honor code standing and have completed two semesters of service leadership experience at the university. The remaining members of the BYUSA presidency are appointed by the incoming president and executive vice president. The BYUSA Presidency is made up of six distinct areas. Each area is led by an area vice president and each member of the presidency serves for a one-year term, alongside the President and Executive Vice President. Additionally, each area vice president appoints executive directors who serve as volunteers from the beginning of summer term to the end of the following winter semester.

The six departments of BYUSA are campus activities, clubs, the Student Advisory Council, the Student Honor department, communications, and involvement. Campus Activities plans, implements, and evaluates large-scale, campus-wide activities for the students, including popular activities like the semi-annual Battle of the Bands and True Blue Foam. In 2017, the campus activities department was divided into Y-Activities and AIM (Arts, Interests and Music). The Clubs area provides administrative oversight for over 100 recognized BYUSA clubs. This area directs the chartering of campus clubs and the training of club officers to ensure the success of the clubs and involvement of students. The Student Advisory Council, or SAC, established in 1988 with the reorganization BYUSA, helps to perform the organizational mission in advising the administration and students across campus. The Student Honor department is tasked with the primary mission of promoting the university Honor Code. In 2007, the Student Honor Association was placed under the BYUSA, with the role of Student Honor Association President becoming an official BYUSA Vice President. Communications helps to coordinate the marketing effort of the association, aiding recruitment and retention of volunteers.

== Elections ==
The BYUSA election process begins in October, once applications are accepted, and ends in March, with a primary and final voting. As of 2020, candidates for BYUSA President and Executive Vice President run independently, instead of a pair. In past years and due to various reasons, the BYUSA elections have caused campus-wide controversy. Across multiple years, candidates have been disqualified and, in 2006, a candidates disqualification led to the firing of a full-time employee. After a successful election and at the end of the out-going administration's term, new BYUSA officers gather atop the Spencer W. Kimball Tower to perform the "Pass the Torch" Ceremony. During this ceremony the outgoing BYUSA President gives the "Oath of Office" to the incoming BYUSA President.

== Notable alumni ==
- Rex E. Lee, President of ASBYU from 1959 to 1960, former dean of the J. Reuben Clark Law School and former Solicitor General of the United States
