= FreeBYU =

Free BYU
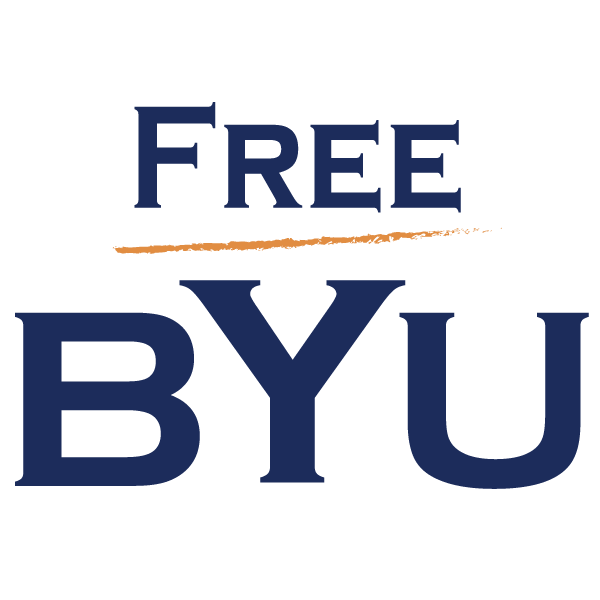
- Founders: Ryan Bowcutt and Caleb Chamberlain
- Established: November 2013; 12 years ago
- Mission: To promote freedom of thought and freedom of religion at BYU
- Head: Brad Levin
- Website: FreeBYU.org

FreeBYU is an advocacy organization dedicated to changing Brigham Young University (BYU) policies such that students can have an environment of religious and academic freedom. Current policies as of 2025 policies prevent students who enroll in the university as members of the Church of Jesus Christ of Latter-day Saints (LDS Church) are not able to express a change in religious beliefs or express their lack thereof without risk of being evicted from their student homes, fired from their campus jobs, or expelled from the university. Currently BYU does not allow students who enrolled as Latter-day Saints to change their religious affiliation, and FreeBYU is advocating for university policy to apply the same standards for formerly LDS students as it does for non-LDS students, including charging a higher tuition rate.

== Actions ==
The organization has petitioned the university, as well as several of its accreditors with statements that BYU does not meet national requirements for religious freedom. These include the American Psychological Association and the American Bar Association which resulted in a change to BYU's honor code in 2016. Shortly after FreeBYU's complaint to the American Bar Association in 2016, BYU had added an "Application for Exception" clause that would theoretically enable a formerly LDS applicant to be enrolled if there were "compelling," "extenuating," and "unusual circumstances." A BYU spokesperson stated in 2017 that the university believes it is in full compliance with accreditation standards and offers the option of applying for a religious exemption, though, FreeBYU states that exemptions are not being granted and students are discouraged from applying for them. In 2015 the group persuaded the president of the American Academy of Religion, Mark Juergensmeyer, to decline to speak at BYU's 2015 International Law and Religion Symposium in protest of the university's denial of religious freedom to their students.

== Media coverage ==
The group's advocacy has received television coverage as well as nationwide newspaper coverage including in The Washington Post, The Wall Street Journal, and The Huffington Post.

== See also ==
- Academic freedom at Brigham Young University
- Church Educational System Honor Code
- Discrimination in education
- Freedom of religion
- Religious discrimination
