= BYU College of Nursing =

Coordinates: 40°14′51″N 111°39′04″W

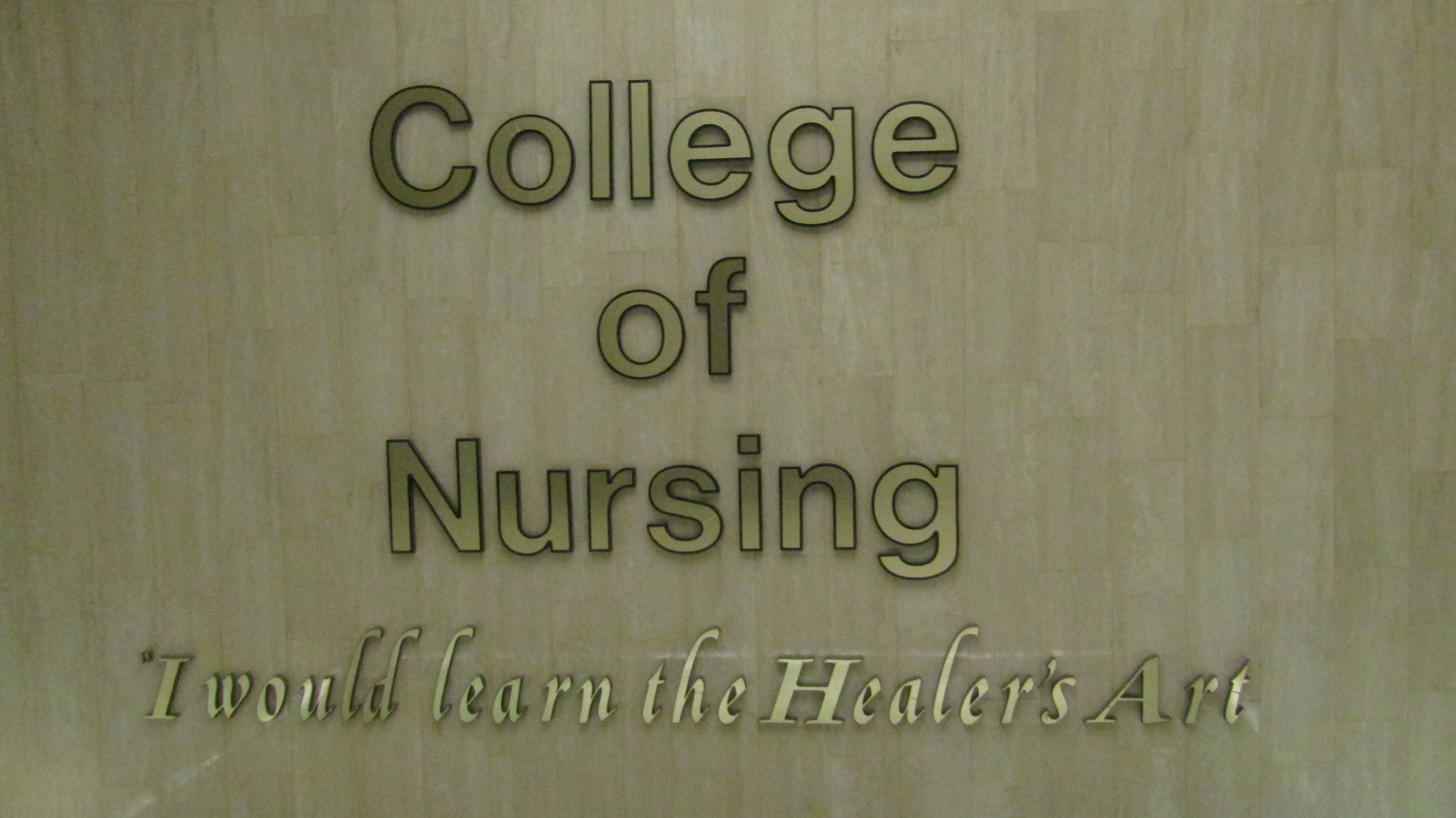
College of Nursing sign in the Spencer W. Kimball Tower, February 2017

The BYU College of Nursing is one of the 16 colleges that make up Brigham Young University. It currently has more than 400 students.

It began as the BYU School of Nursing in the fall of 1952 offering a bachelor's degree in nursing. Vivian Hansen was the first dean. The church's older nursing school, established in 1905 at LDS Hospital, was closed in 1955 in favor of BYU's new program. In March 1959, BYU announced that their School of Nursing would be transitioned and become the newly established College of Nursing.

In 1963, an associate degree in nursing was established under the auspices of BYU's College of Industrial and Technical Education. The change occurred because some sectors of the academic nursing community felt that associate degree programs should not coexist with bachelor's degree programs. In 1973, the associate degree program was moved into the College of Nursing making transfer between the two programs easier.

By 1976, the program had shifted to only granting bachelor's degrees with the associate degrees phased out. In that year the college of nursing added a masters program in nursing.

== Sources ==
- Ernest L. Wilkinson, ed., Brigham Young University: The First 100 Years (Provo: BYU Press, 1975) Vol. 2, p. 634-637; Vol. 3, p. 97-100.
- BYU College of Nursing website
