= Nancy Darling =

American psychologist

Academic background
- Education: BS, 1981, MS, 1987, PhD, developmental psychology, 1990, Cornell University
- Thesis: Control beliefs during early adolescence: a comparison of the niche formation and socialization models of development (1990)

Academic work
- Institutions: Oberlin College; Bard College; Penn State University; Dickinson College
- Website: nancydarling.org

Nancy Ellen Darling is an American psychologist. She is the William and Jeannette Smith Chair of psychology at Oberlin College, editor-in-chief of the Journal of Adolescence, and founder of 1step2life.

== Early life and education ==
Darling is of German ancestry; her maternal grandparents arrived in the United States between World War I and World War II. She earned her Bachelor of Science degree, Master's degree, and PhD from Cornell University. Upon completing her doctoral degree, she joined the faculty of psychology at Temple University for her post-doc fellowship until 1993.

== Career ==
Darling joined the faculty at Dickinson College following her post-doc fellowship for two years before accepting a position at Penn State University (PSU). While at PSU, she collaborated with Linda Caldwell to develop the "Structure of Adolescent Leisure" project, which allowed undergraduates to enter multi-disciplinary field research. Darling later authored a study published in the Journal of Youth and Adolescence which concluded that young boys were more vulnerable when it comes to dating. She left PSU in 2000 to accept an associate professor position with Bard College's psychology faculty. During her short tenure at Bard, she co-published Theory, measurement, and methods in the study of family influences on adolescent smoking with Patricio Cumsille through the Addiction journal. She also continued her focus on teenagers and lying and conducted a study which found that 98 percent of teenagers have lied to their parents.

In 2005, Darling transferred to Oberlin College in Ohio to accept an associate professor position in their psychology department. While serving in this role, she was also appointed the newest editor-in-chief of the Journal of Adolescence. In 2019, Darling and her research team received a $20,000 grant towards moving the web-based app 1step2life, which helps adolescents manage chronic pain, for purchase through the iTunes App Store.
