= Spencer W. Kimball Tower =

Building in Provo, Utah

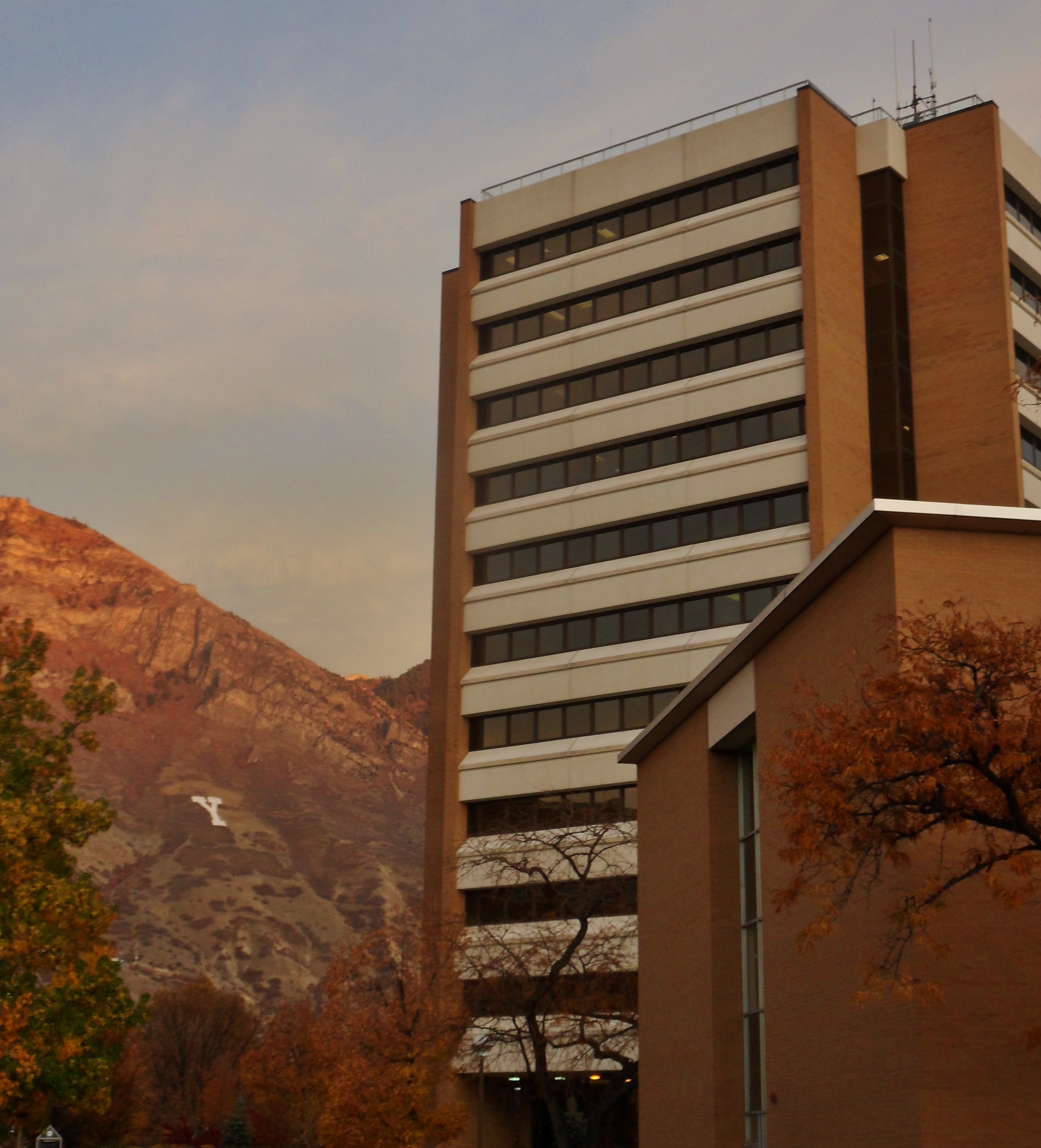
- Interactive map of the Spencer W. Kimball Tower area

General information
- Type: Educational
- Location: Provo, Utah
- Coordinates: 40°14′51″N 111°39′04″W
- Completed: 1981

Height
- Height: 162 feet (49 m)

Technical details
- Floor count: 12

Design and construction
- Architects: Hal Beecher; John Fetzer; Emil B. Fetzer

The Spencer W. Kimball Tower, also known as the Kimball Tower or KMBL (formerly SWKT /ˈswɪkɪt/), is a 12-story building that houses classrooms and administrative offices on the Brigham Young University campus in Provo, Utah.

== Honorary name ==
The building is named after Spencer W. Kimball, the twelfth president of the Church of Jesus Christ of Latter-day Saints. During the summer of 2018, and upon request from the Kimball family, its nickname was changed from the SWKT to KMBL.

== Design ==
Completed in 1981, the building stands at 161 feet 6 inches (49.23 m). It was the tallest building in Provo, Utah until the completion of the Provo Fourth District Courthouse in 2018 and the Pedersen Patient Tower of Utah Valley Regional Medical Center in 2019, the latter currently being the tallest building in Provo. To offset a corridor effect, the building was positioned at a 45-degree angle to nearby buildings.

== Tenants ==
The building houses Brigham Young University's College of Family, Home and Social Sciences and College of Nursing and their various subsidiary departments and programs.

== See also ==
- Brigham Young University
- College of Family, Home and Social Sciences
- List of Brigham Young University buildings
