= Professional Psychology: Research and Practice =

- Discipline: Psychology
- Language: English
- Edited by: Susan J. Simonian

Publication details
- Former name: Professional Psychology
- History: 1970–present
- Publisher: American Psychological Association (United States)
- Frequency: Bimonthly
- Impact factor: 1.5 (2024)

Standard abbreviations
- ISO 4: Prof. Psychol.: Res. Pract.
- NLM: Prof Psychol Res Pr

Indexing
- ISSN: 0735-7028 (print); 1939-1323 (web)

Links
- Journal homepage

The Professional Psychology: Research and Practice is a peer-reviewed, English language journal published six times per year by the American Psychological Association (APA). The journal "publishes articles on the application of psychology, including the scientific underpinnings of the profession of psychology. All articles for this journal should have clearly stated implications for practicing psychologists". The editor-in-chief is Susan J. Simonian.

First published in 1970, as Professional Psychology, the name of the journal was extended to Professional Psychology: Research and Practice in 1983.

The journal has implemented the Transparency and Openness Promotion (TOP) Guidelines. The TOP Guidelines provide structure to research planning and reporting and aim to make research more transparent, accessible, and reproducible.

== Abstracting and indexing ==
According to the Journal Citation Reports, the journal has a 2024 impact factor of 1.5.
