= Church Educational System Honor Code =

Standards system

The Church Educational System (CES) Honor Code is a set of standards by which students and faculty attending a school owned and operated by the Church of Jesus Christ of Latter-day Saints (LDS Church) are required to live. The most widely known university that is part of CES that has adopted the honor code is Brigham Young University (BYU), located in Provo, Utah. The standards are largely derived from codes of conduct of the LDS Church and were not put into written form until the 1940s. Since then, they have undergone several changes. The CES Honor Code also applies for students attending other CES schools: Brigham Young University–Idaho, Brigham Young University–Hawaii, and Ensign College.

== Standards ==
The CES Honor Code governs not only academic behavior but also everyday conduct on or off campus as well as dress and grooming standards of students and faculty, with the aim of providing an atmosphere consistent with LDS principles. The Honor Code requires:

- Maintain an Ecclesiastical Endorsement, including striving to deepen faith and maintain gospel standards.
- Be honest.
- Live a chaste and virtuous life, including abstaining from sexual relations outside marriage between a man and a woman. Living a chaste and virtuous life also includes abstaining from same-sex romantic behavior.
- Abstain from alcoholic beverages, tobacco, tea, coffee, vaping, marijuana, and other substance abuse.
- Participate regularly in Church services.
- Respect others, including the avoidance of profane and vulgar language.
- Obey the law and follow campus policies, including the CES Dress and Grooming standards.
  - Dress: Be modest in fit and style. Dressing in a way that would cover the temple garment is a good guideline, whether or not one has been endowed. Accommodations may be made for athletic participation. Be neat and clean. Sloppy, overly casual, ragged, or extreme clothing is not acceptable.
  - Grooming: Hair should be clean, neat, modest, and avoid extremes in styles and colors. Men's hair should be neatly trimmed. Men should be clean-shaven. If worn, mustaches should be neatly trimmed.
- Encourage others in their commitment to comply with the Honor Code and Dress and Grooming standards.

== History of the Honor Code at BYU ==
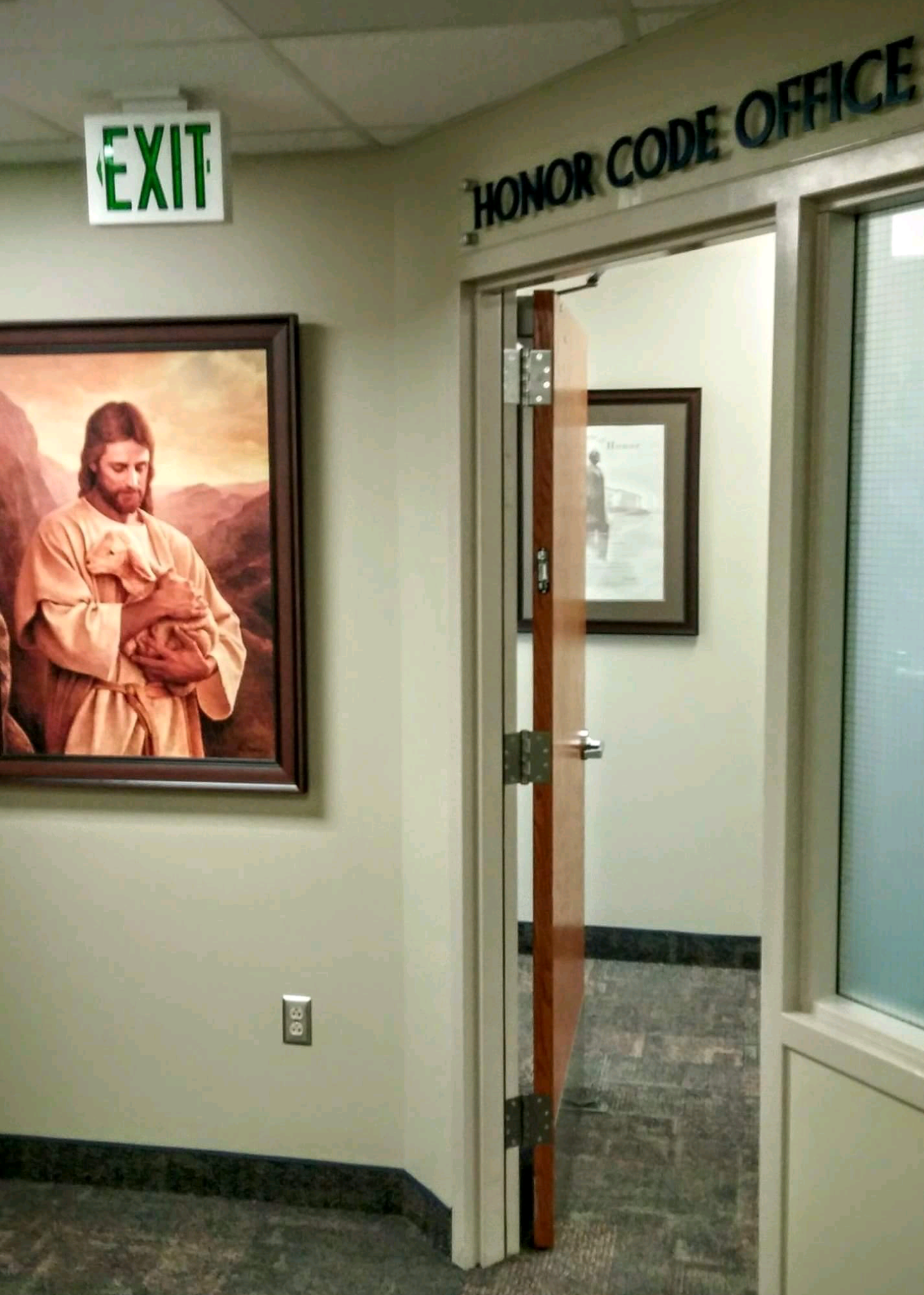
BYU Honor Code office entrance

Every year BYU has an "Honor Week" dedicated to celebrating the legacy of the Honor Code and to remind students of the importance of following it. Early forms of the CES Honor Code are found as far back as the days of the Brigham Young Academy (1875–1903). Early school president, Karl G. Maeser, created the "Domestic Organization", which was a group of teachers who would visit students at their homes to see that they were following the school's moral rules. In the 1901 school catalog this guide of conduct included a prohibition on "strong drink and tobacco", "profanity and obscenity", attending parties not under the control of "responsible persons", "keeping late hours, having improper associates, and visiting places of questionable repute". Maeser also, however, relied largely on individual student's honor and honesty in keeping the rules, intending faculty visits as times of counsel rather than espionage. After George H. Brimhall served as president, enforcement became somewhat more lax (there were no more faculty visits), but adherence to the same basic principles were encouraged. From 1910 to 1960 the annual student catalog would only contain a few brief sentences on student conduct and discipline, often mentioning the prohibition of tobacco, "improper associates", and "visiting places of questionable repute", though the 1930s and 40s saw increased standards regarding rules related to student housing and the dress code. Women were allowed to wear slacks only on Saturdays, and men wore uniforms for a short time.

In 1949 students drafted the first Honor Code enforced by an Honor Council of students and administrators, and was used mainly for cases of cheating and academic dishonesty. The Student Honor Council, created around 1949, oversaw case violations. This council met with enough success among students in alleviating cheating that in 1957 BYU president Ernest L. Wilkinson suggested the Honor Code expand to include other school standards. This led to an expansion during the 1960s which created the bulk of what the Honor Code represents today: rules regarding chastity, dress, grooming, drugs, and alcohol. Instead of a short paragraph on university standards, the undergraduate catalog began printing a more detailed set of Honor Code policies in 1968, including a clause requiring students to act when observing any violation and a list of banned drugs ("amphetamines, barbiturates, hallucinogenic drugs, psychedelic drugs, and narcotics"). This change came because the administration completely took over the previously student run honor code and disbanded the student senate and student honor code committee. The honor code was expanded in the 1970 catalog with a requirement to adhere to the "standards of dress" and the addition of marijuana and LSD to the list of banned drugs.

In the 1960s, several rules regarding longer hairstyles in men were introduced after long hair on men became associated with the radical movements then springing up on college campuses around the country. However, long hair and beards were not completely against the rules until the mid-1970s with the 1978 annual catalog being the first edition to contain any detailed dress and grooming standards code. The 1960s also saw changes in rules regarding women's dress, as LDS Church leaders made statements against low-cut dresses and short skirts. By this time, women were allowed to wear slacks and pant-suits, but jeans were not allowed until 1981.

== Policies on homosexuality ==
=== Ban on gay students ===
Before the 1960s there was little explicit mention of homosexuality by BYU administration, but by 1962 a ban on homosexual students was enacted. On 12 September 1962 Apostles Spencer W. Kimball and Mark E. Peterson and BYU President Ernest L. Wilkinson agreed on a university policy that "no one will be admitted as a student ... whom we have convincing evidence is a homosexual". They agreed to share information about individuals cases of homosexual members between general church administration and BYU administration. This policy was reiterated in Wilkinson's address to BYU in 1965 when he stated "we [do not] intend to admit to this campus any homosexuals. ... [I]f any of you have this tendency and have not completely abandoned it, may I suggest you leave the University immediately .... We do not want others on this campus to be contaminated by your presence." The 1967 version of the Honor code stated that "homosexuality will not be tolerated" along with not approving "any form of artificial birth control".

The ban on any homosexually oriented students was softened a decade later by Wilkinson's successor Dallin H. Oaks in a 19 April 1973 Board of Trustees meeting. There it was decided BYU would allow students who had "repented of" homosexual acts and "forsaken" them for a "lengthy period of time". Additionally they would allow students "guilty of irregular sexual behavior" (not including fornication or adultery equivalents) who were "repentant" and "showed evidence" that the act(s) would "not be repeated" while still banning overt and active homosexuals.

=== Shock therapy ===
According to the Standards Office director from 1971 to 1981, all homosexual BYU students who were reported to the Standards Office (now called the Honor Code Office) were either expelled, or, for "less serious" offenses, were required to undergo therapy in order to remain at the university; in "special cases" this treatment included "electroshock and vomiting aversion therapies". This program of aversion therapy—which spanned from the late 1950s until at least the late 1970s—was dedicated to "curing" male homosexual students reported by bishops and BYU administrators through administering electrical shocks or vomit inducing drugs while showing "nude" pictures of men to the patient in an attempt to associate pain with homosexual visual stimulation.

=== Ban on advocacy and coming out ===
In the late 1990s a reference to homosexual conduct was added to the code, and in 2001 Associate Dean of Students Lane Fischer over the BYU Honor Code Office stated that it was inappropriate for a BYU student to advocate for the [homosexual] lifestyle by publishing material or participating in public demonstrations as well as advertising ones same-sex preference in any public way. He also required homosexual students facing discipline to refrain from same-sex "dating, holding hands, kissing, romantic touching, showering, clubbing, ets., as well as regular association with homosexual men."

=== Current policies ===
In 2007, BYU changed the honor code to read that stating one's sexual orientation was not an honor code issue while removing the phrase that "any behaviors that indicate homosexual conduct, including those not sexual in nature, are inappropriate and violate the Honor Code." The change also clarified the policy on advocacy of LGBTQ rights or romantic relationships. Several students, including gay and lesbian students, thought that the previous wording was confusing and unclear. While both homosexuals and heterosexuals must abide by the church's law of chastity (i.e. no sexual relations outside of marriage, and no pornography), the Honor Code additionally prohibits all forms of physical intimacy that give expression to homosexual feelings (i.e. dating, kissing). There is no similar restriction against expressing heterosexual feelings. The first explicit mention of homosexuality in the language of the school's code of conduct available to students was not noted until the Fall of 2009. Both this version and the 2010 versions contained a clause banning homosexual advocacy defined as "seeking to influence others to engage in homosexual behavior or promoting homosexual relations as being morally acceptable." In early 2011, BYU quietly removed the clause prohibiting advocacy. In February 2020, the administration removed two paragraphs from the honor code prohibiting homosexual behavior, including "all forms of physical intimacy that give expression to homosexual feelings". Together with this change they updated a bullet from "Live a chaste and virtuous life" and replaced it with "Live a chaste and virtuous life, including abstaining from any sexual relations outside a marriage between a man and a woman." In 2023, it was again updated with additional clarity for same-sex behavior "Live a chaste and virtuous life, including abstaining from sexual relations outside marriage between a man and a woman. Living a chaste and virtuous life also includes abstaining from same-sex romantic behavior."

== Enforcement ==
Honor code policies and principles are promoted by BYUSA, the campus student association, and the Honor Code Office. The office handles all accusations and violations, and works in conjunction with bishops of BYU wards. If the student's bishop is thought to be able to corroborate the alleged infraction, the accused student may be required to sign a legal form waiving his or her rights to ecclesiastical privacy, which allows the school direct access to the bishop and any content discussed on the said topic, or others which may have been in violation of the Honor Code, but not yet reported. Not all students at the school are familiar with LDS standards, so students who break the code for the first time are usually only contacted by mail as a warning and clarification of standards. Later violations may cause the student to be called into the office to speak with an Honor Code officer. Severe and continued violations can merit expulsion. Students may be brought to the attention of the Honor Code office by faculty, staff, or other students but "no anonymous reports will be acted upon". BYU Events Staff patrol school dances for Honor Code violations. Cafeteria, library, athletics, and BYU Testing Center employees are asked to encourage students to follow dress and grooming standards, sometimes denying service to students not adhering to the code. In 2001 it was reported that less than 2 or 3 percent of BYU students are referred to the Honor Code Office annually, though no percentage on punitive actions were given. Data from 1955, however, showed that 9 students were expelled, 23 were suspended, and 72 were placed on probation.

=== Beard exemptions ===
With regard to facial hair restrictions, permission to wear facial hair can be granted in three specific cases: For men with pseudofolliculitis barbae, for BYU theatrical performances, and (since a policy change in January 2015) for religious reasons. Regarding medical exemptions, students/faculty with any medical condition aggravated by shaving were previously asked to visit a BYU Student Health Center doctor who would fax a recommendation to the Honor Code office. The student/faculty must then have visited the office to fill out the requisite exemption paperwork. A new BYU ID card was then issued including a symbol marked "BE" and a photograph with the facial hair. However, in the most recent revision to the grooming standards, pseudofolliculitis barbae is the only diagnosis for which an exemption will be granted. In regard to theater exemptions, only productions put on by the BYU Theatre and Media Arts department are eligible for exemption. Such exemptions are only granted for the duration of the production. Thus, in such cases a temporary exemption card issued. Religious exemptions will be coordinated through the university chaplain's office.

=== Ecclesiastical endorsement ===
Students are required to sign in agreement to the Honor Code, Dress and Grooming Standards, Residential Living Guidelines, and Academic Honesty Policy yearly. Additionally they must have a yearly interview with a leader of their local religious congregation, or (for non-religious students or those without a local congregation) the non-denominational BYU chaplain and maintain this ecclesiastical endorsement to attend BYU. In the past about 5% of BYU was not LDS, but that number has shrunk closer to 1% in recent years. The chaplain or religious leader is instructed to inquire about the student's understanding of and adherence to specific policies. These include the ban on the consumption of specific substances, viewing pornography, any extramarital heterosexual "relations", any homosexual conduct, and adherence to the Honor Code, Dress and Grooming Standards, Residential Living Guidelines, and Academic Honesty Policy on and off campus. LDS bishops and branch presidents are additionally instructed to verify that LDS students demonstrate "appropriate and consistent church activity", "abid[e] by the standards of the Church", and are in "full fellowship". The chaplain or religious leader can revoke the endorsement at any time.

=== Honor code staff ===
As of 2017, the enforcement of the BYU's Honor Code is directed by Spencer Hawkins, who is under Vice Dean of Students Casey Peterson, who is under Dean of Students Vernon Heperi. Over the Office of Student Life is Vice President Janet S. Scharman, who reports to university president C Shane Reese who is under the BYU Board of Trustees, which is composed of general authorities and general officers of the LDS Church.

=== Housing accommodation ===
Students have the option of living in on-campus housing, with family members who reside in the local area, or in off-campus housing which must pass a school inspection for health and safety, as well as satisfactory separation of gender quarters and compliance with other standards. Students under certain conditions can apply for a housing waiver for special approval.

- Single parents with children.
- Single students living with parents.
- Single students who are taking classes away from Provo.
- Graduate students.
- Under certain conditions, as determined by the Off-Campus Housing Office, the university housing requirement may be waived for other students who have a special circumstance or hardship.

This approval is designed to ensure that students live in a safe environment that is consistent with the standards of the University. Since students are only allowed to live in BYU-approved housing, landlords in the area consider it important to meet the standard in order to gain residents. The housing standards mandate that bathrooms and bedrooms be off limits to those of the opposite sex. Members of the opposite sex are required to be out of the apartment by midnight. Guns are permitted in off-campus housing only if the gun owner receives written permission from both the landlord and all residents in the apartment.

In 2003, BYU announced that beginning in 2007, housing would only be approved if it was within 2 miles (3.2 km) of campus. The school did this out of concern that its Office of Residence Life was being stretched too thin and was unable to meet demands. Students feared the new boundaries might lead to a rise in apartment prices and decrease the amount of available housing. According to BYU, the effect would be minimal, as 98 percent of students already lived within the designated area. About 40 properties lost BYU approval due to the new guideline.

== Controversies ==
There has been several controversies surrounding BYU's honor code, with criticism from students, advocacy groups, local governmental institutions, and national press coverage.

=== YouTube block ===
As part of a BYU ban on websites containing sexual content, the popular website YouTube was blocked on all BYU networks. In 2007 Fox News highlighted BYU's blocking of pornographic and other sites, including YouTube, from campus Internet connections, pursuant to the code's prohibition of the viewing of pornographic material. BYU lifted the YouTube ban in 2009, again receiving nationwide press attention.

=== Religious and academic freedom ===
According to BYU spokesperson Carri Jenkins, LDS BYU students who experience a transition in faith views away from church orthodoxy are "not eligible to attend BYU" and are thus not granted religious freedom by the university. There are many non-believing and former Mormons on campus, and some have been expelled for publicly expressing disagreement or doubt. In 2014, the organization FreeBYU composed of BYU alumni and students asked the BYU Board of Trustees to reform the Honor Code to allow LDS students to change their religion, then subsequently challenged BYU's accreditation by the Northwest Commission on Colleges and Universities on the basis of the honor code's suppression of academic and religious freedom. In 2015, religion scholar Dr. Mark Juergensmeyer boycotted a religious freedom conference held on BYU campus in protest over its policy of expelling and terminating LDS students who lose their faith. In 2015-2016, the American Bar Association reviewed formal complaints stemming from a student's allegations that the honor code violates the Association's non-discrimination standards; the student had written a book that laid out why same-sex marriage was not, according to his research, at odds with the LDS Church's teachings. Shortly after the submission of the American Bar Association complaint, BYU added an "Application for Exception" clause that would theoretically enable a formerly LDS applicant to be accepted if certain criteria are met.

=== Treatment of rape survivors ===
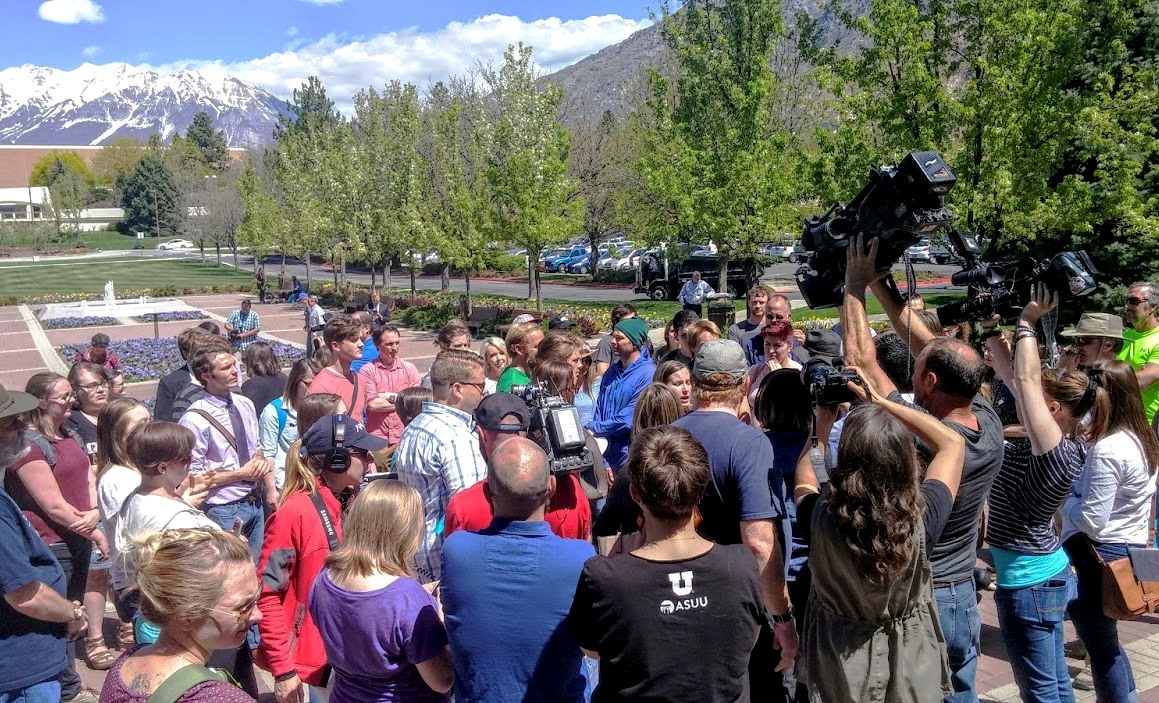
On April 20, 2016, protesters delivered 60,000 petition signatures to BYU administration asking them to add an immunity clause shielding these sexual assault survivors from any Honor Code investigations

Beginning in 2014 and continuing through 2016, several students have alleged that when they reported being raped, the school punished them for violating the honor code. Some students report that, after having been victimized by a rapist, they were told they were guilty of sexual sin because of past actions that came to light in connection to their sexual assaults. This atmosphere may prevent some students from being willing to report similar crimes to police, a situation that local law enforcement have publicly criticized. The Victim Services Coordinator of the Provo Police Department called for an amnesty clause to be added to the Honor Code which would excuse rape survivors for past infractions of BYU policies. Hollingshead states "The victim of a sexual assault will never be referred to the Honor Code Office for being a victim of sexual assault. A report of sexual assault would always be referred to the BYU Title IX Office – not to the Honor Code office." BYU launched a review of the practice which concluded in October 2016. BYU announced several changes to how it would handle sexual assault reports, including adding an amnesty clause for the victim of sexual misconduct, and ensuring under most circumstances that information is not shared between the Title IX Office and Honor Code Office without the survivor's consent. According to a Spring 2017 BYU survey answered by over 40% of BYU students, 6.5% of women and 1.2% of men experienced unwanted sexual contact in the last year as BYU students. Of those, 64% of these incidents were not reported to any formal organization with 21% of those who did not report the crime citing a fear of Honor Code discipline or their ecclesiastical endorsement being questioned as a reason for not reporting.

=== LGBTQ policies ===
Controversy surrounding the BYU's honor code has grown since 2014, with criticism from students, advocacy groups, local governmental institutions, and national press coverage. Various LGBTQ advocacy groups have protested the honor code and criticized it as being anti-gay. In the fall of 2016 BYU faced national criticism when many called its Honor Code policies for LGBTQ students discriminatory while the university was being considered as an addition to the Big 12 Conference. The Princeton Review has regularly ranked BYU among the most LGBTQ-unfriendly schools in the United States and the campus currently offers no official LGBTQ-specific resources after revoking permission in 2012 for the unofficial university gay-straight alliance USGA to continue meeting on campus.

=== Other universities ===
In March 2008, the University of Texas at San Antonio was accused of plagiarizing a portion of BYU's honor code related to cheating and plagiarism. Southern Virginia University, which also espouses LDS standards, uses a similar code of conduct.

=== Student athletes ===
The Honor Code received national attention in March 2011 when the university dismissed BYU basketball player Brandon Davies from the team for violating the code, reportedly by having premarital sex, the same day the college basketball rankings came out listing BYU as the #3 team in the nation. Davies was reinstated to the university the next school year, and returned to the basketball team, where he completed his athletic eligibility in 2013.

=== Racial bias ===
The CES Honor Code has been criticized at various times including by Darron Smith, a former BYU instructor, Marcus Whalen, a BYU football player, and Don Harwell, president of Genesis, as being applied in a racially disparate manner on many occasions. However, Vai Sikahema, a former BYU football player and native Tongan, has defended the honor code enforcement as not racist citing a number of players, of various racial backgrounds, who had positive experiences at BYU.

=== Facial hair ===
BYU students led a campaign to loosen the beard restrictions in 2014, but it had the opposite effect at Church Educational System schools: some students who had previously been granted beard exceptions were found no longer to qualify, and for a brief period the LDS Business College required students with a registered exception to wear a "beard badge", which was likened to a "badge of shame". Some students also join in with shaming their fellow beard-wearing students, even those with registered exceptions.

== See also ==
- Culture of The Church of Jesus Christ of Latter-day Saints
