= WomanStats Project =

Database Startup

WomanStats logo

The WomanStats Project is a donor-funded research and database project housed at Brigham Young University that "seeks to collect detailed statistical data on the status of women around the world, and to connect that data with data on the security of states." The WomanStats Database aims to provide a comprehensive compilation of information on the status of women in the world. Coders comb the extant literature and conduct expert interviews to find qualitative and quantitative information on over 300 indicators of women's status in 174 countries with populations of at least 200,000. Access to the online database is free.

== History and structure ==
WomanStats began as an outgrowth of a paper Dr. Valerie M. Hudson (of the Brigham Young University Political Science department) and one of her graduate students, Andrea den Boer, published in International Security on the association between national security and the abnormal sex ratio in Asia. After the success and influence of their first article, (later added as one of their top twenty national security articles of that journal of all time), Hudson and den Boer did further research on the connection between the status of women and national security, but found that there was no single database that covered the range of topics that they needed for their research. Consequently, they began compiling information on variables regarding the status of women around the world.

The database was officially formed in 2001 and grew exponentially as it later added more variables. The Project went live on the Internet in July 2007. The principal investigators are: Valerie M. Hudson (International Relations), Bonnie Ballif-Spanvill (Psychology, emeritus), and Chad F. Emmett (Geography) all from Brigham Young University, Mary Caprioli from the University of Minnesota, Duluth (International Relations), Rose McDermott from Brown University (International Relations), Andrea Den Boer from the University of Kent at Canterbury in the United Kingdom (International Relations) and S. Matthew Stearmer from the Ohio State University (Sociology; doctoral student).

Approximately a dozen undergraduate and graduate students at Brigham Young University and Texas A&M University work at any one time as coders for the project. The coders take the raw quantitative and qualitative data collected in government reports, news articles, research papers, etc. and sort the applicable information on women into categories. They may also implement scales developed by the principal investigators, or that they (the students) themselves have developed.

== Database ==
As of February 2011, the database has 307 variables, covers 174 nations with populations over 200,000, uses 18,015 sources and contains over 111,000 individual data points. All data is referenced to original sources. Not every variable has information for each country; similarly, not all countries have information for each variable: overall, about 70% of country-variable combinations have information. These database coding gaps exist where information is not available or is incomplete, or variables are not collected and reported by governments or international organizations. At times, information from different sources may be contradictory, and the WomanStats Database records this discrepant information for triangulation purposes.

== Users and role of the database ==
The database is meant to help fill a hole in the extant data on the situation of women around the world. WomanStats data and research has been vetted and/or used by the United Nations, the United States Department of Defense, the Central Intelligence Agency, and the World Bank. Their data and research were also used by the United States Senate Committee on Foreign Relations in crafting the International Violence Against Women’s Act.

The Inter-Agency Network on Women and Gender Equality (IANWGE) of the United Nations has stated that the WomanStats project "filled a major gap in the availability of data on women" (2007).

Victor Asal and Mitchell Brown, researchers not affiliated with WomanStats, stated in an article published in Politics and Policy that "one of the most significant challenges of cross-national empirical studies of the prevalence of interpersonal violence is the paucity of available data, particularly reliable data," and that "WomanStats has allowed for an important first glimpse at analyzing the factors related to interpersonal violence." They conclude by stating that "Our findings suggest that, in the same way that larger disciplinary resources have invested in interstate and intrastate war, disciplinary resources need to be expended in creating a data set exploring interpersonal violence. Until the rights and the lives of women and children are taken as seriously as the survival of states by more proactively collaborating on projects like WomanStats, we will continue to only have a small lens through which to understand problems like this."

Princeton University professor Evan S. Liberman wrote, "Although data on political regimes and group conflict have been in far greater demand by political scientists than data on gender politics and policies, two gender-related databases provide...examples of innovative HIRDs. Both the Womanstats database project (Hudson et al. 2009) and the Research Network on Gender Politics and the State (RNGS) project (McBride et al. 2008) are well-integrated presentations of quantitative and qualitative data characterizing the quality of gender relations around the world and, in particular, analytic descriptions of the treatment of women."."

== Research ==
The research component of WomanStats focuses on exploring the relationship between the situation of women and the behavior and security of states. Current research initiatives include:

- Exploring the relationship between violent instability and inequity and family law.
- Examining the effect of polygyny and marriage market dislocations on the rise of suicide terrorism.
- Documenting discrepancies between laws on the books and cultural practices on the ground concerning gender issues.
- Investigating how well the situation of women predicts the peacefulness of nations-states, compared to their variables such as democracy, wealth, and civilization.

The Project has published articles in International Security, International Studies Quarterly, Peace and Conflict, Journal of Peace Research, Political Psychology, Cumberland Law Review, and World Political Review, and has a forthcoming book from Columbia University Press.
