= Journal of Adolescence =

- Discipline: Pediatrics, developmental psychology
- Language: English
- Edited by: Nancy Darling

Publication details
- History: 1978-present
- Publisher: Wiley
- Frequency: Bimonthly
- Impact factor: 3.256 (2020)

Standard abbreviations
- ISO 4: J. Adolesc.

Indexing
- ISSN: 0140-1971

Links
- Journal homepage; Online archive

The Journal of Adolescence is a peer-reviewed scientific journal of primary research on adolescence. It was established in 1978 and is published by Wiley. The editor-in-chief is Nancy Darling (Oberlin College). It is unique among developmental journals in that it is owned by a British charity that funds courses, conferences, and training for professionals working directly with youth (FPSA). FPSA is funded solely by the journal. According to Clarivate Analytics, the journal has a 2020 impact factor of 3.256. JoA is an interdisciplinary social science journal and international in scope. It is explicitly developmental, covering age-related change or age-specific phenomenon in individuals 10–25.
