= Martin B. Hickman =

American academic

Martin B. Hickman (May 16, 1925 – October 14, 1991) was the first dean of Brigham Young University's (BYU) College of Family, Home and Social Sciences.

== Biography ==
Hickman was born in Monticello, Utah. He graduated from Logan High School and began college at Utah State Agricultural College (now Utah State University). He then served in the United States Army as an infantryman during World War II. From 1947 to 1949 he served as a missionary in France for the Church of Jesus Christ of Latter-day Saints.

After the war Hickman resumed his studies at the University of Utah, where he received bachelor's, master's and Ph.D. degrees. He also received a masters of public administration from Harvard University.

For seven years Hickman was in the United States Foreign Service being assigned to posts in Germany and Hong Kong. He was a professor at the University of Southern California before joining the faculty of Brigham Young University.

At Brigham Young University Hickman served a total of 17 years as a dean. For 12 years he was the dean of the College of Social Sciences and then for five years the dean of the College of Family, Home and Social Sciences after it was formed by the merger of the College of Social Sciences and the College of Family Living. Hickman first became dean of the College of Social Sciences at BYU in 1970, not long before the end of the Ernest L. Wilkinson administration. Early in the administration of Dallin H. Oaks he chaired a committee that studied the role of department chairmen at the university which led to department chairmen becoming the main decision makers in hiring of new faculty, although the proposals still needed approval of the central administration. In a 1971 speech to a BYU faculty group, Hickman argued that any faculty members at the university who understood and was committed to the school's mission and purpose would have full academic freedom there because they would not seek to do things at odds with this purpose. Hickman served as director of the BYU Jerusalem Center for 18 months beginning in 1988.

Among works by Hickman are Problems of American Foreign Policy and David M. Kennedy: Banker, Statesman, Churchman. Articles by Hickman include "Mr. Justice Holmes: A Reappraisal" in Western Political Quarterly Vol. 5 (March 1952) p. 71, "Undergraduate Origin as a Factor in Elite Recruitment and Mobility: the Foreign Service — a Case Study" co-authored with Neil Hollander in the Political Research Quarterly Vol. 19 (1966) no. 2, p. 337-353 as well as an article in BYU Studies on J. Reuben Clark's views on the constitution. An essay by Hickman was included in the 1972 collection of essays by Latter-day Saint scholars, To the Glory of God published by Deseret Book Company. Hickman also edited the book The Military and American Society published by Glencoe in 1971. Hickman also edited a book entitled Essays on Public Ethics.

Hickman was a member of the Utah Constitution Revision Commission and also served as president of the Utah Academy of Arts, Sciences and Letters.

Hickman married the former Joann Emmett. They had six children. In the LDS Church Hickman held many callings including as a bishop and a counselor in a stake presidency.

BYU has an annual lecture named after Hickman.

== Personal life ==
Hickman had six daughters, named Allison, Patricia, Heather, Melissa, Elizabeth, and Anne.
