= Berrett =

Berrett is the name of several people:

- James Berrett (born 1989), professional footballer
- LaMar C. Berrett (1926–2007), American professor
- Marcus Berrett (born 1975), English squash player
- Tim Berrett (born 1965), race walker
- William E. Berrett (1902–1993), American author
