= Ernest L. Wilkinson =

President of Brigham Young University from 1951 to 1971

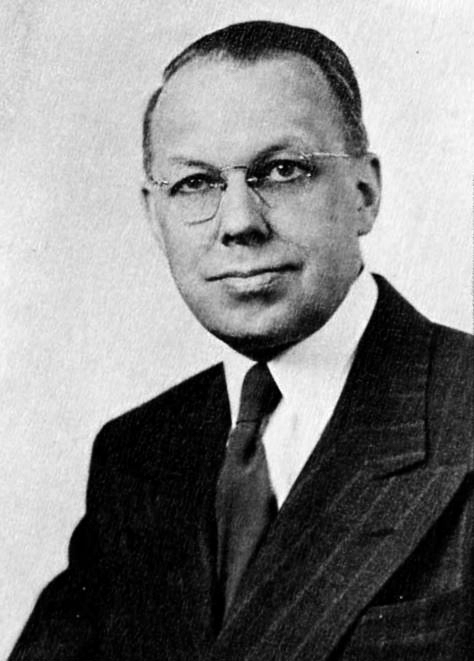
- Wilkinson pictured in The Banyan 1952, BYU yearbook

President of Brigham Young University
- In office February 1951 – July 1971
- Preceded by: Howard S. McDonald
- Succeeded by: Dallin H. Oaks

Personal details
- Born: May 4, 1899 Ogden, Utah, U.S.
- Died: April 6, 1978 (aged 78) Salt Lake City, Utah, U.S.
- Education: George Washington University

Ernest Leroy Wilkinson (May 4, 1899 – April 6, 1978) was an American academic administrator, lawyer, and prominent figure in the Church of Jesus Christ of Latter-day Saints (LDS Church). He was president of Brigham Young University (BYU) from 1951 to 1971, simultaneously overseeing the entire LDS Church Educational System (CES). He is credited with the expansion of BYU. Under his presidency, the student body increased six times to over 25,000 students due to the university's physical growth and his aggressive recruiting policies; the number of colleges at the university increased from five to thirteen, and the number of faculty members increased four-fold. Wilkinson focused on recruiting more faculty and convincing current faculty to receive education outside the university. As a result, the number of teachers with doctorate degrees increased from 50 to 500. Associate and doctoral programs were created for BYU.

The J. Reuben Clark Library (now the Harold B. Lee Library (HBLL)) was built, and library resources were expanded by 500%. The number of buildings on the BYU campus increased from 6 to over 300, an increase in floor space of about 4.2 million square feet. Wilkinson initiated the construction of various student housing options to accommodate over 6,000 students, and increased the number of student religious congregations. During his 20-year presidency, the number of congregations increased from 1 student branch to 98 wards and 10 stakes for LDS students. The BYU Honor Code was also more clearly established, and a strict dress code was added.

Wilkinson was a strongly conservative Republican. He unsuccessfully ran for the U.S. Senate in 1964, while he was president of BYU. Prior to his career in education, he was a lawyer in Washington, D.C. and New York City, his most well-known and lucrative case being a $32 million settlement from the U.S. government for the Ute Indian Tribes.

== Background and education ==
Wilkinson was born in Ogden, Utah, one of seven children of Robert Brown Wilkinson and Annie Cecilia Anderson. Robert Wilkinson was a Scottish immigrant who arrived in the United States as a young boy, later married Annie Anderson, and worked for the Southern Pacific Railroad for 25 years, where he supported the union; according to family, he once ran for mayor of Ogden as a Socialist candidate.

Growing up, Wilkinson associated mostly with older boys and men, as there were few boys his age. He became involved in cockfighting, buying a few cocks with the money he made from delivering the Deseret News, but stopped after police started arresting offenders.

To cultivate his faith as a member of the LDS Church, Wilkinson's mother suggested he attend Weber Academy in Ogden, which was then owned by the church. Before his graduation, he won the Dr. Edward S. Rich oratorical contest with his speech "American Ideals". He graduated from Weber Academy in 1917, and continued his studies at the expanded Weber Academy, then known as Weber College, where he organized the Public Service Bureau (a service organization), was editor of the yearbook, and was president of the student body for two years. He competed in forensics meets and won the state championship with his team. He received the Lewis Efficacy Medal for students excelling in scholarship and public service, and was class valedictorian. After a year at Weber College, he became a member of the Student Army Training Corps unit located at BYU. He attributed his success to what he learned at Weber Academy and became interested in the idea of offering a religiously affiliated education to more LDS youth. After the war, he became a regular student at BYU and, among other things, edited the weekly newspaper White and Blue, and was president of his senior class. He and a few colleagues received special recognition when they beat the Princeton debate team. He earned a Bachelor of Arts degree at BYU in 1921.

He married Alice Valera Ludlow, a native of Spanish Fork, whom he had met while they were both students at BYU. They were married in the Salt Lake Temple on August 16, 1923. The ceremony was performed by James E. Talmage. Alice was elected vice president of the student body with Wilkinson as her campaign manager and had studied drama at BYU. The Wilkinsons had five children.

== Career ==
After graduation, Wilkinson began teaching English and speech at Weber College. During this time, Wilkinson began to take an active interest in politics. He ran as a Democrat for county auditor and lost.

=== Law School ===
In 1923, Wilkinson was involved with the campaign of William H. King for United States Senate. King invited Wilkinson to be his secretary (administrative assistant) in Washington D.C. He agreed so that he could take evening classes at George Washington University. When he arrived in Washington D.C., he was informed by King's current secretary that he was to arrange for another position for him. He was offered the position of assistant architect of the Capitol Building. Uninterested in architecture, Wilkinson found a job as a teacher of a business high school teaching shorthand and typing, still able to attend law school at night. He earned a law degree from George Washington University summa cum laude in 1926. He was admitted to the Washington D.C., Utah, and New York bar associations. He studied at Harvard Law School on scholarship for his graduate studies. Even though five years of teaching were prerequisite for entering in the doctoral program, he was granted exception from Dean Roscoe Pound of the law school due to his academics at George Washington University. In 1927, Wilkinson graduated from Harvard Law School with a Doctor of Juridical Science.

=== Teaching law ===
He initially accepted a position teaching law at the University of California, but quickly resigned in order to pursue another offer to teach at the more prestigious New Jersey Law School, the largest law school in the United States at the time, where he taught from 1927 to 1933. After aiding Hughes, Schurman, and Dwight law firm with a challenging tax problem, he was invited to join their law firm in New York City. He began practicing there as well as teaching at New Jersey Law School, where he was known as a notoriously difficult professor.

=== Practicing law ===
After working for future Supreme Court chief justice Charles Evans Hughes, and working with Moyle & Wilkinson in Washington D.C., Wilkinson opened up a private firm in 1940 where he practiced for 11 years. One case involved a young, American soldier in Japan who was sentenced to death for accidentally killing a child in a motorcycle accident. He succeeded in lowering the sentence to only the time in jail that the man had already served. Even though he received no compensation for the case, he considered it the most gratifying case he ever worked on. He served as attorney for the Ute Indian Tribes in their suit to be compensated for land never paid for by the U.S. government as part of the Treaty of 1880. In 1950, this suit was upheld by the United States Court of Claims and as a result, the Ute tribes were awarded $32 million. Due to Wilkinson's work, the Indian Claims Commission was signed in 1946 by Harry S. Truman. This opened up more claims to be filed and prosecuted by Wilkinson, making his firm the most active in the country for tribal cases. Wilkinson's share of the Ute Indian settlement as the plaintiff's attorney made him independently wealthy and allowed him to give up his law practice to pursue his interests in education. When he became the 7th president of BYU, Wilkinson created a new law firm: Wilkinson, Cragun, and Barker. He was the senior partner, but management was left to his brother, Glen Wilkinson, Cragun, and Barker.

=== Political ===
Wilkinson was heavily interested in politics. Influenced by his socialist father from a young age, his viewpoints shifted to conservatism in his adult years. During the Cold War, LDS Church leaders were particularly fearful of the influence of communism in the United States. This was manifest in their choice of strictly conservative Wilkinson as the next BYU president. LDS Church leader Stephen L. Richards hoped in Wilkinson's inauguration that Wilkinson would, "implant in youth a deep love of country and a reverential regard for the Constitution of the United States." Wilkinson made it clear that he supported the Republican party and disliked communism. Some students at BYU criticized his "unabashed partisanship". Despite his interest in politics during the beginning of his presidency at BYU, he did not seriously consider running for the U.S. Senate. Though his law career had taught him how to navigate federal bureaucracy, he did not feel that he had the skills to win a congressional race. In addition, he was more concerned, at the time, in the work he could accomplish in Utah as BYU president rather than in Washington. Several times during the 1950s and 1960s, Wilkinson approached church president David O. McKay for his permission to run for public office. He was advised not to run until 1964 when he was given a one-year leave of absence to run for the senate. In his absence, duties of the president and chancellor were taken up by Earl C. Crockett and Harvey L. Taylor, respectively. In 1964, Wilkinson won the Republican Party nomination for the United States Senate, defeating Sherman P. Lloyd. Wilkinson lost in the general election to incumbent Senator Frank Moss. Within a month after his defeat, Wilkinson returned to BYU, but members of the Board of Trustees maintained that Harvey Taylor remain chancellor. As consolation, Wilkinson was granted a $20,000 salary, the largest salary of any BYU employee at the time.

== BYU presidency ==
=== The First Era: 1951–1957 ===
==== Beginnings ====
After Howard S. McDonald resigned from his position as BYU president, Christian Jensen served as interim president for about ten months. In 1949, at a dinner for Jensen, Wilkinson gave a speech asserting the ways in which he believed BYU could excel. He expressed that he had high aspirations for the school and believed in the values of combining a spiritual and secular education. After the dinner, Wilkinson was invited to share his ideas with the church's First Presidency and the Board of Trustees. The favorite candidate of J. Reuben Clark to fill the vacancy of BYU president was the vocally conservative Wilkinson, who lobbied LDS Church leaders to be appointed as president of BYU and was offered the position in July 1950. Wilkinson refused to be paid a salary, which attracted church officials in the aftermath of tense financial negotiations with previous president, McDonald. In September 1950, Wilkinson changed the members of the board of trustees from local members to the Quorum of the Twelve Apostles with the First Presidency serving as president and vice presidents, respectively, of the board. Wilkinson wanted a direct line of communication to McKay, the church president at the time. Wilkinson would frequently counsel directly with McKay, avoiding the Board of Trustees. From 1951 to the end of 1952, Wilkinson had no official assistants besides William F. Edwards, the dean of the College of Commerce, and William E. Berrett, a professor of religion. At the end of 1952, Harvey L. Taylor became Wilkinson's first administrative assistant. Wilkinson was considered by most of his subordinates difficult to work with, citing him as dictatorial and inconsiderate. At 5'5", his nicknames among colleagues were "Little General" or "Little Napoleon". Aware of his difficulty getting along with his employees, he claimed he "[didn't] have time to be polite".

==== Unification and CES ====
In 1953, in an attempt to unify church schools, Wilkinson was named administrator of the church's schools. Besides his duties at BYU, he oversaw the administrative duties of Ricks College (now Brigham Young University-Idaho), LDS Business College, the McCune School of Music, and Juarez Academy in Mexico, along with seventeen institutes and 193 seminaries. Wilkinson proposed that the name CES be changed to University of Deseret, but his proposal was rejected for multiple reasons, one of them being that people were unwilling to drop the name of Brigham Young from their school. After this expansion of CES and thus Wilkinson's duties, he appointed Edwards and Berrett as vice presidents of the LDS Department of Education. In 1953, CES considered reacquiring Weber College, Snow College, and Dixie College in order to expand its influence. A referendum was included on the November 1954 ballot to transfer these three junior colleges from the State of Utah back to CES. The controversial referendum was defeated in the election with less than 40% of voters in favor. Still interested in pursuing junior colleges, CES established the Church College of Hawaii (CCH) (now Brigham Young University-Hawaii) in 1955 in Laie, Hawaii. Shortly thereafter, CCH and other LDS institutions in the Pacific were removed from CES, considered to be closer to "missionary operations", and the presidents of the institution were subject to the local school systems rather than CES.

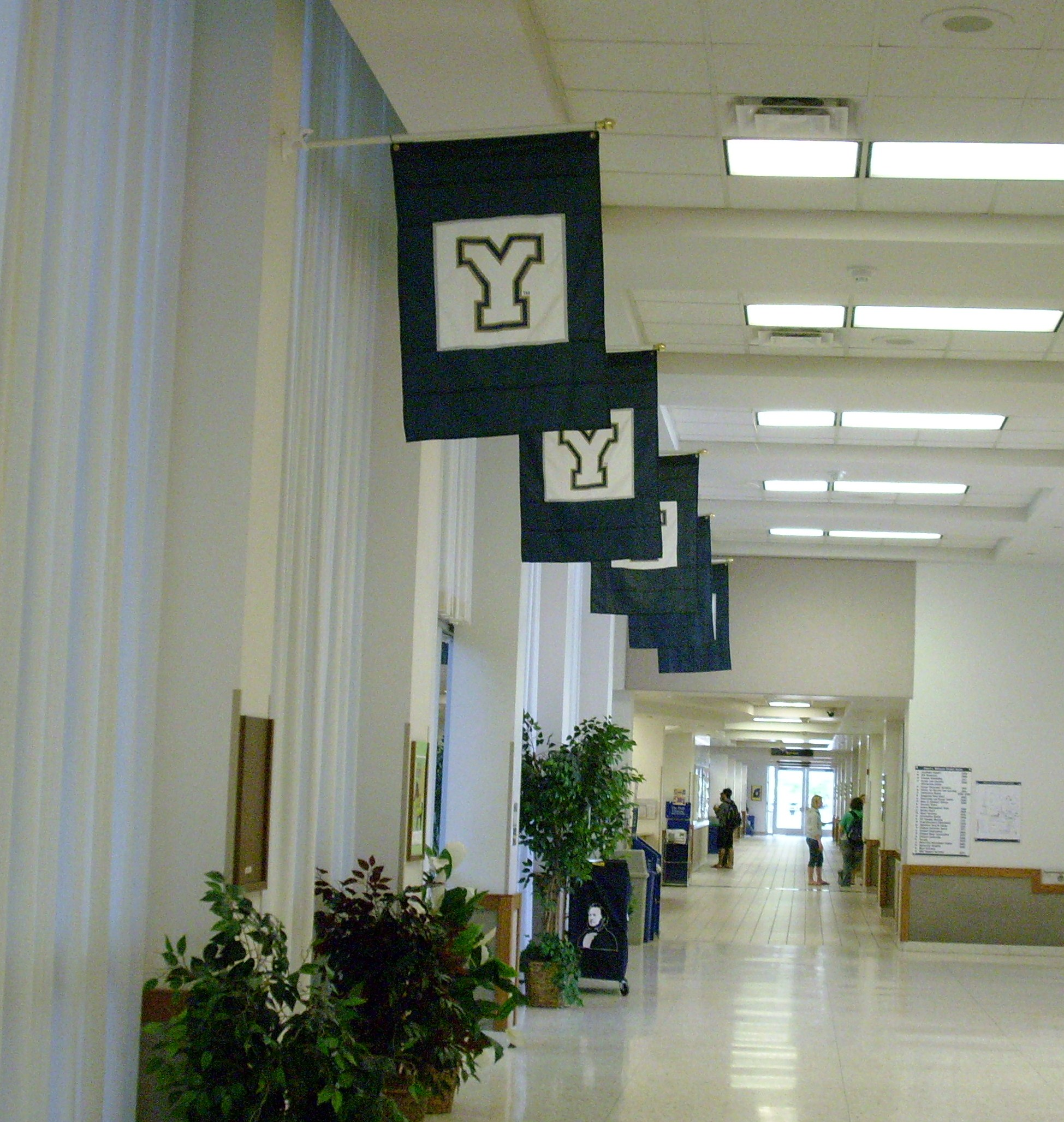
A hallway in the Wilkinson Center at BYU, named after President Ernest L. Wilkinson.

==== Enrollment and the establishment of colleges ====
The next concern for Wilkinson was increasing the enrollment of BYU. He instituted a program in which members of BYU faculty would travel with general authorities to stake conferences. They attended nearly 180 conferences, emphasizing the benefits of a BYU education. Enrollment increased by more than twenty-five percent in fall of 1952. After discontinuing the program in 1952, Wilkinson continued to recruit for BYU by sending representatives to high schools and church missions, which received some criticism from mission presidents and was terminated by the First Presidency shortly after. Despite the criticisms, Wilkinson's tactics were successful, and enrollment increased to over 10,000 by the 1956–57 school year. Colleges were reorganized in order to group similar studies together and allow for the most growth and success of students. For example, the College of Arts and Sciences and the College of Applied Sciences were broken into multiple colleges in 1954 including, but not limited to, the College of Biological and Agricultural Sciences and the College of Humanities and Social Sciences. The Department of Physical Education, Health, and Athletics was separated from the College of Education and established as its own college and the College of Education was forced to relinquish its monopoly on the training of teachers and made to be a college specific to teaching methods. Wilkinson improved the salaries of faculty in order to recruit more talented professors and staff members to BYU. The Army and Air Force ROTC program at BYU was established by Wilkinson in 1951 for the Air Force and 1968 for the Army. An engineering program with its own building was established by Wilkinson with the help of Harvey Fletcher, and in 1956, broke into three programs: civil, mechanical, and electrical. Wilkinson also established a College of Family Living in late 1951, alleged to be the first in the United States, however, Purdue University had opened a Department of Family Life in 1946. In order to increase the size and quality of the graduate program at BYU, Wilkinson instituted a policy that encouraged faculty to pursue graduate studies at other universities. Through the policy, the university could obtain faculty qualified to teach graduate students as well as faculty who have attended other universities and thus obtained a more well-balanced education, preventing the "academic inbreeding" that had been a problem at the institution. The number of professors that held doctorates, especially from other universities, increased significantly.

==== Building construction ====
Wilkinson sought to increase the size and the beauty of the BYU campus. The first construction project during his presidency commenced July 1952. The Student Service Center, or unofficially, the bookstore, was dedicated in March 1953. After the planning committee devised a "master plan" for building and expansion of BYU campus, and the LDS Church appropriated $500,000 for the acquisition of more land in pursuit of the building projects proposed in the master plan. Wilkinson received ten million dollars from the board of trustees in order to build student housing and academic buildings. In order to accommodate more students, student housing was expanded. Heritage Halls were apartment-style dormitories that included a kitchen were built for girls, and Helaman Halls, which included a large dining hall, were built for men. With these additions, the number of women's accommodations increased to 2,000 students while the men's accommodations increased to 1,600 students. 150 homes were bought from the Mountain Home Air Force Base in Idaho and transported to Provo. Considered a fairly temporary solution, the complex was named Wyview Village and was intended to accommodate married students. Construction of the Harvey Fletcher Building was completed in 1953 in order to house the new engineering program, though other departments, namely the English department was allowed to share the space due to the lack of buildings. The David O. McKay Building was completed in 1954 for the College of Education. The college shared its walls with some other humanities disciplines until the campus was expanded more in later years. The Benjamin Cluff Jr. Building, along with two greenhouses, was built to house the laboratories for the College of Biological and Agricultural Sciences in 1955. These buildings were torn down for the new Life Science Building completed in 2014. The Howard S. McDonald Student Health Center, which also housed the Air Force ROTC program, was completed in 1955 and contained an x-ray room and a hydrotherapy room. A separate Student Health Center now exists. The Howard S. McDonald Building now contains BYU's MRI Research Facility. The Joseph F. Smith Family Living Center was built in 1957 to house the College of Family Living. Dedicated in 2005 and still home to the College of Family, Home and Social Sciences, the Joseph Fielding Smith Building took the place of the Family Living Center. A number of other smaller, miscellaneous buildings were built in the 1950s, including a ticket office for the football stadium and a poultry laboratory for the Animal Science Department. Significant effort was also put into improving the campus utilities and landscaping. The Department of Physical Plant was established in 1954. Due to the nearly seventy hours of work he was putting in per week, Wilkinson suffered a heart attack in October 1956. He was permitted to return to work in January 1957. Taylor, Edwards, and Berrett took over his responsibilities while he was recovering.

=== The Second Era: 1957–1971 ===
==== Building construction ====
With the continuous growth of the student body, Wilkinson understood the need to continue expanding campus. The first large project was the BYU Motion Picture Studio (now the LDS Motion Picture Studios), built in 1958. In 1961, At a cost of nearly $4,000,000, the J. Reuben Clark Jr. Library (now the HBLL) was built due to lack of library resources and space in the Heber J. Grant Library. The library was built to accommodate 3,000 people and house one million books. The Jesse Knight Building was completed in 1960 to house the College of Commerce. Plans were made in early 1960 for a new student center; student costs were raised by ten dollars each student to raise the funds for the project. The building cost $7 million, and two-thirds of the funds came directly from students. The building was six stories and contained a bookstore, cafeteria, two theaters, lounges, a bowling alley, and a barber shop. A consensus hadn't been reached on the name of the building. Students were interested in naming the building "Memorial Union" to honor BYU students killed in war. Shortly before the dedication, the board of trustees revealed they intended to name the building the Ernest L. Wilkinson Student Center. Although some students believed that they should have had the right to name the building since they paid for most of it, the board of trustees named the building after Wilkinson. During his presidency, church appropriations to the school increased from $1 million to $22 million annually, while university expenditures increased from $2 million to $65 million annually.

==== The Honor Code ====
Wilkinson felt that his job was to prevent the decay of moral values of the students and increase administrative control of the BYU Honor Code. He instituted a strict dress code meant to prevent students from dressing like "go-go girls" or "surfers". Women's skirts and dresses were required to be below the knee and they were prohibited from wearing pants. Upon protestation, female students achieved a small victory when they were permitted to wear slacks at the university's bowling alley. Men were required to keep their hair cut short. Wilkinson pushed to increase the social interaction among the students, believing that it would be facilitated if every student was required to wear a name tag. Due to the unpopularity of the plan among students, this was never enforced. Wilkinson attempted to weed out students who were not following the honor code, because he felt that they prevented other worthy students from attending the university. Wilkinson also instituted a rule against male facial hair with the exception of a small, well-trimmed mustache.

==== The 1966 BYU spy ring controversy ====
Extremely conservative and anti-communist, Wilkinson was not bashful in expressing his political philosophy to BYU students and faculty. After his unsuccessful run for U.S. Senate in 1964, he "returned to campus with a vengeance". Some of the employees publicly supported his opponent Sherman Lloyd in the primaries, which Wilkinson felt was disloyal. When he returned to BYU, he became aware of a group of "liberal" teachers who were interested in changing the social and political atmosphere at BYU. He invited right-wing speakers to BYU and gave highly political speeches on campus. Wilkinson gave a lengthy May 1965 commencement address in which he attributed the beginning of moral decay of American values to Franklin D. Roosevelt's New Deal as well as criticizing the current president Lyndon B. Johnson's views of social security. Hoping to incite controversy, Wilkinson planned to give another politically charged speech in April 1966. He asked his comptroller, Joseph Bentley, to find students to report on professors' reactions to the speech. Bentley in turn asked student Stephen Hays Russell to report on professors' reactions unofficially. The two made a list of professors to surveil, and Russell recruited ten students to take notes on what their professors said about Wilkinson's speech in their classes. Political science professor Ray Hillam was one of Bentley and Russell's targets. He was notified of the spy ring by one of his students and requested a formal hearing be arranged. In the first hearing on September 15, presided over by vice presidents of the university, Hillam was formally charged for being pro-communist and disloyal to the university, with information gathered by the student spies used as evidence. Hillam rejected the charges and questioned the motives of all involved. The vice presidents formally issued a report on October 17. The report did not address that Hillam was the target of a spy ring, only accusing him of "minor indiscretions". Ronald Hankin, one of the students involved, went to local television and radio stations to inform them of the spying scandal and Wilkinson's involvement in it. Wilkinson admitted that he recruited students to report on faculty members in an official statement. In the official history of BYU, Wilkinson included information about the spy ring, but omitted any information that led him to appear guilty.

==== End of presidency ====
Wilkinson considered the most important accomplishment of his term as president to have been the organization of student wards and stakes. Wilkinson was the ninth Commissioner of Church Education of the LDS Church. During his tenure, he also bore the title "Administrator–Chancellor of the Unified Church Schools System". On April 21, 1966, Wilkinson gave an address to the student body of BYU, entitled "The Changing Nature of American Government from a Constitutional Republic to a Welfare State". This was published in booklet form by Deseret Book Company. After McKay died in 1970, Neal A. Maxwell was named the new commissioner of CES. Wilkinson had relied on McKay as a buffer in interacting with Harold B. Lee, a senior member of the Board of Trustees with whom Wilkinson differed greatly in educational and administrative philosophies. Sensing a lack of support among the church leaders, Wilkinson resigned from his position as BYU president in mid-1970 and was released at the beginning of 1971. Even though he was no longer president, Wilkinson hoped to be involved in the establishment of the J. Reuben Clark Law School. Due to his domineering reputation, school officials were unsure that he should continue to be so closely involved in administration of BYU, so they asked him to edit the university's official centennial history. Published in 1976, Brigham Young University: The First One Hundred Years was composed of four volumes.

== Death ==
Wilkinson died of a heart attack April 6, 1978. Before he died, he had been supervising the work on his biography, Ernest L. Wilkinson: Indian Advocate and University President.

== LDS Church service ==
In the early 1930s, Wilkinson served as branch president in New York and Queens, and later, bishop of the Queens Ward. His colleagues in the Hughes law firm called him the "Bishop of Wall Street". In 1940, he served as second counselor to Ezra Taft Benson in the presidency of the Washington Stake and as first counselor from 1944 to 1948 to a later president of the stake. He represented the church on the General Commission for Chaplains of the Army and Navy.

== Legacy ==
During the twenty years of Wilkinson's presidency at BYU, the student body increased from 4,004 students in 1951 to over 25,000 in 1971. The university went from having 5 colleges with 37 departments to 13 colleges with 71 departments. The number of faculty members increased by from 244 to 932, while the number of them holding a doctoral degree increased from 50 to more than 500. The first associate and doctoral programs were organized. The quarter system was changed to the semester system. The number of resources in the library increased by 500%. The number of buildings increased from six permanent buildings to 254 permanent buildings and 85 temporary buildings, an increase from 800,000 to 5 million square feet of floor space. After 1972, student housing could accommodate almost 6,000 students, an increase from the 1,200 student accommodations in 1951. The achievement Wilkinson was most proud of was the creation of student wards and stakes. In 1951, there was one branch for LDS students and in 1971, there were 98 wards and 10 stakes for LDS students.

== Notes ==
Party political offices
Preceded by Arthur Vivian Watkins	Republican nominee for U.S. Senator from Utah (Class 1); 1964	Succeeded by Laurence J. Burton
Academic offices
Preceded by Howard S. McDonald	President of Brigham Young University; February 1951 – July 1971	Succeeded by Dallin H. Oaks
