= Howard S. McDonald =

American educator and college administrator

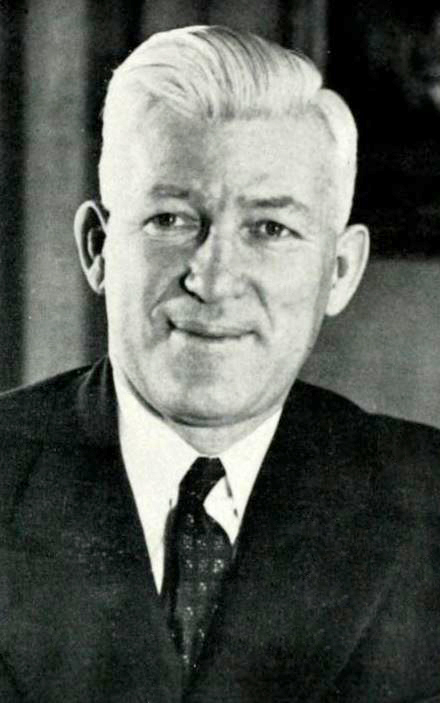
- McDonald pictured in The Banyan 1946, BYU yearbook

2nd President of California State University, Los Angeles
- In office 1949–1962
- Preceded by: P. Victor Peterson
- Succeeded by: Albert D. Graves

7th President of Brigham Young University
- In office July 1945 – October 1949
- Preceded by: Franklin S. Harris
- Succeeded by: Ernest L. Wilkinson

Personal details
- Born: July 18, 1894 Holladay, Utah, U.S.
- Died: October 25, 1986 (aged 92) Los Alamitos, California, U.S.

Howard Stevenson McDonald (July 18, 1894 – October 25, 1986) was an American university administrator, and president of Brigham Young University (BYU) and California State University, Los Angeles.

McDonald was president of BYU from 1945 to 1949. During his presidency, the board of trustees approved a master of theology program. Enrollment at BYU greatly increased after World War II, and McDonald petitioned the board of trustees to build many buildings, including the Eyring Science Center. McDonald helped establish the student health center and student wards. He discouraged students from smoking and drinking. He left BYU because of his strained relationship with the board of trustees.

McDonald was president of Los Angeles State College (now known as California State University, Los Angeles) and Los Angeles City College in 1949. In 1958, Los Angeles City College received its own president as a junior college. McDonald helped found San Fernando State College (now known as California State University, Northridge) in 1956 and was president of the general faculty until 1958. He helped to formally organize the colleges, recruit more faculty, build more buildings, and petition the state of California for funds.

== Early life and education ==
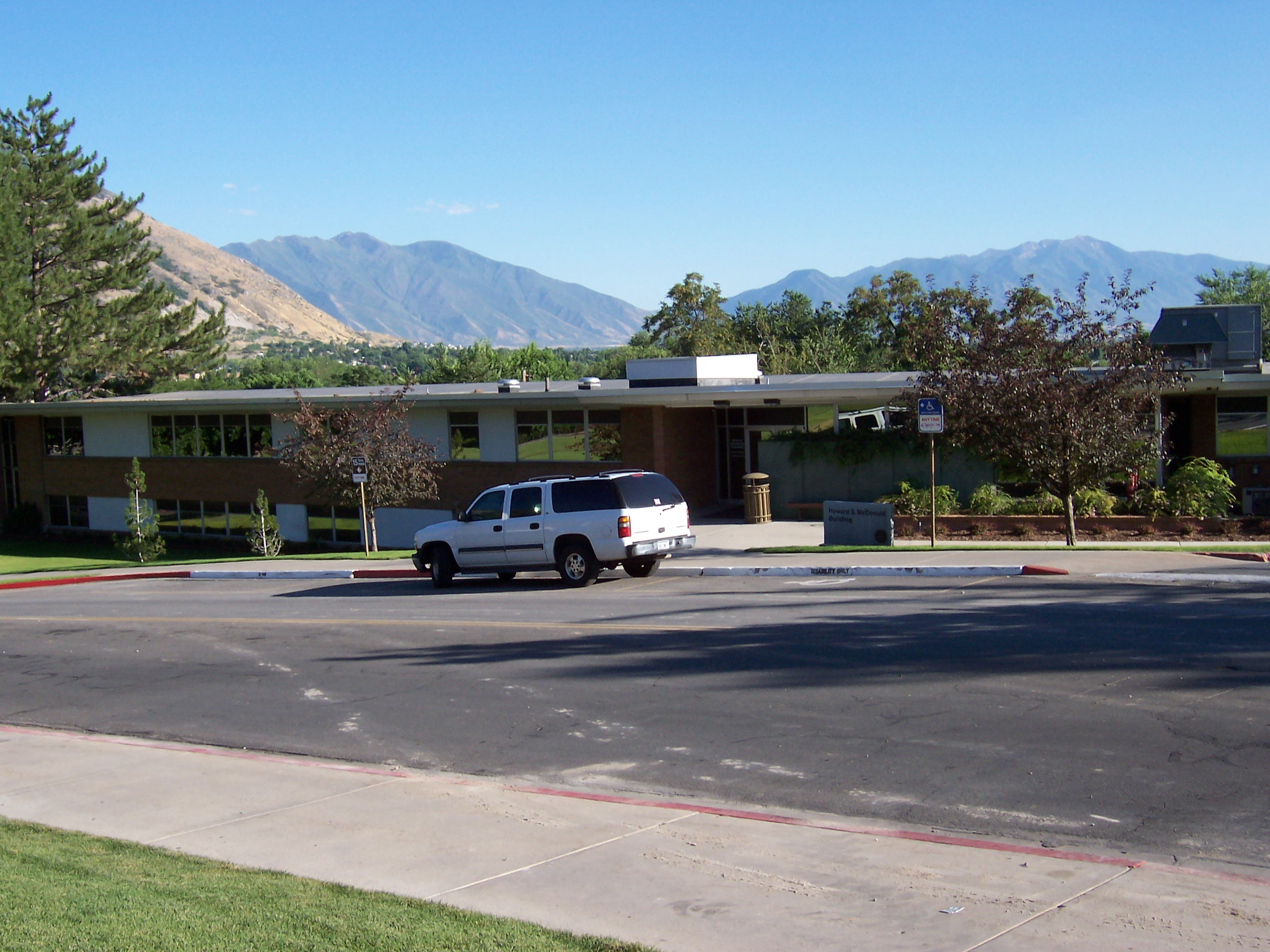
The Howard S. McDonald building at Brigham Young University

McDonald was born in Holladay, Utah on July 18, 1894, to Francis McDonald and Rozella Stevenson. He attended the first seminary established by the Church of Jesus Christ of Latter-day Saints (LDS Church), which originated at Granite High School. He served as an LDS Church missionary in the Eastern States Mission, which was headquartered in New York City. He spent part of his mission as president of the Western Pennsylvania Conference headquartered in Pittsburgh. While serving in this area, McDonald married Ella Gibbs on September 26, 1917, following their service as missionaries in the Eastern States Mission. They were married in the Salt Lake Temple on September 26, 1917. They had two daughters.

In 1918, McDonald served in the 163rd Artillery Brigade in France. Following his military service, he graduated from Utah State Agricultural College (now Utah State University) in 1924 in architectural engineering. He taught advanced mathematics at the college during the chairman's sabbatical.

== Teaching career ==
Franklin S. Harris asked him to head BYU's engineering department in 1924, but McDonald declined, stating that he was unqualified for the position. He taught math and physical education part-time at Mission High School while studying at the University of California, Berkeley. He received an M.A. there in 1925. In 1928, he was vice-principal and dean of boys at Balboa High School, and from 1934 to 1936 he was director of personnel in the San Francisco School District, becoming superintendent in 1937. From 1944 to 1945, McDonald was superintendent of schools in Salt Lake City, Utah. He instituted the 12-year system and successfully campaigned for better funding for public schools. In 1949 he completed a Doctorate of Education, also from the University of California.

== BYU president ==
=== Importance of religious studies ===
McDonald became president of BYU in 1945. He communicated directly with the board of trustees, rather than receiving instructions through a commissioner of church schools. Unlike with his previous administrative roles, the board of trustees sought more direct input over administrative details. The board selected McDonald as president to emphasize religious leadership at the school. While the board initially considered closing the university, McDonald advocated for its continued operation and convinced the trustees of the institution's value to the church.

Religious studies at BYU provided materials and training for seminary instruction. materials and training for seminary teachers. However, religious instructors had previously focused on encouraging students to live righteous lives rather than on intellectually engaging with religious ideas. John A. Widtsoe advised against forming a graduate school separate from the rest of BYU, stating there were fears that an overly scholarly school of divinity could create unorthodox graduates. In 1949, the board of trustees approved a master of theology degree and encouraged graduates to study elsewhere for their doctorate.

=== Sudden increase in enrollment ===
Enrollment more than doubled in the winter and fall semesters as veterans from World War II came home and enrolled at BYU. His administration received surplus military buildings from the Federal Public Housing Authority in San Francisco to house the huge influx of students, and they began to build permanent buildings to replace them. McDonald initiated the construction of several new buildings to alleviate the intense crowding at the university. He petitioned the board of trustees for approval to build a large science building, partially planned by Dean Carl F. Eyring. The planned building was larger than the five largest buildings on campus combined. While some members of the board disliked the proposal, Joseph Fielding Smith championed the project. In 1945, the projected cost was around $300,000, and the board approved a budget of $950,000. The final cost of the Eyring Science Center was over 2 million dollars. Enrollment in the College of Arts and Sciences increased five percent. Construction on other buildings was suspended because of the high cost of the science building, and in 1947 several physical education instructors resigned because of "unfavorable working conditions," and the board of trustees considered abandoning sports programs altogether. Other in-progress building projects were heavily delayed. The board of trustees approved plans for the Smith Fieldhouse, which was completed in 1951.

Instructors at the time often taught over thirteen hours per week. McDonald recruited more professors to teach the more numerous student body, including Hugh Nibley and M. Wells Jakeman. He petitioned to increase professors' salaries to make positions more attractive, and over 80 professors were hired during his administration. He created a dean of student life position to organize student services, and gave more responsibility to department chairs, college deans, and their assistants, who conveyed faculty requests and ideas to him.

Ernest L. Wilkinson suggested that BYU increase the cost of tuition, and McDonald agreed with the idea, but stated that the First Presidency did not wish to burden students with more expensive tuition, despite their anxiety about the LDS Church's increased cost in enrolling so many more students. The cost to educate each student increased by $55 from 1944 to 1946, and faculty requested and received raises to combat postwar inflation.

=== Changes to student life ===
In 1946, McDonald organized a student health plan with Vasco Tanner as the chair on the committee. Full-time doctors were employed through a $10 contribution from each student. The student health center was named after him. He developed a character recommendation required for new applicants to the university to be sure that its attendees conform to the standards of the LDS Church. Also in 1946, McDonald made efforts to stop students from smoking and drinking. He gave students three months to change their habits. He also called for more strict adherence to curfew. In Amanda Knight Hall, doors were locked on the outside and inside after curfew, causing one woman to publicly protest the policy as dangerous in the case of an emergency. In 1947, McDonald helped establish student branches, with student leaders. This helped create a more intimate atmosphere for church services, as previous Sunday school classes could exceed 100 students at a time.

=== Leaving BYU ===
Ongoing requests for additional funding led to tension between McDonald and the board of trustees. J. Reuben Clark, then a counselor in the First Presidency, was also unhappy with McDonald's performance as president of BYU and harshly rebuked his behavior; as tension grew McDonald began looking for another job. In 1949, McDonald left BYU to become president of Los Angeles City College and Los Angeles State College.

== President of California State University, Los Angeles ==
When McDonald became president of both Los Angeles City College and Los Angeles State College, they were housed in borrowed spaces with part-time faculty. He hired administrators to help him formally organize the colleges. He found a site within LA to house the new Los Angeles State College of Applied Arts and Sciences, which replaced the Los Angeles State College in 1949. He recruited faculty, petitioned the California state government for more funds, and met with the state architect to plan buildings. The college opened in its new location in 1958. When McDonald retired in 1962, seven buildings on the new campus were completed. The Los Angeles City College remained as a junior college under John Lombardi in 1958.

College students in California began to protest the loyalty oaths that faculty in California state colleges were compelled to make in 1950. After prohibiting the student executive council at the Los Angeles State College of Applied Arts and Sciences from discussing the issue, they resigned in protest. After negotiations, McDonald rescinded the ban on discussing the loyalty oaths and the student executive council returned.

He helped found San Fernando Valley State College in 1956, where he was president of the general faculty 1956–1958. He retired in 1962 and was appointed as a regional representative of the US Commissioner of Education, a position he held until 1964.

== LDS Church service ==
McDonald served as a member of the San Francisco stake high council, a member of the stake presidency, and as stake president. In 1943, McDonald asked to be released as stake president so he could continue pursuing his doctoral studies.

Fifteen years after leaving as BYU president, he returned to Utah and served as president of the LDS Church's Salt Lake Temple from 1964 to 1968.

Academic offices
Preceded by Franklin S. Harris	President of Brigham Young University; July 1945 – October 1949	Succeeded by Ernest L. Wilkinson
