= Rasband =

Rasband is a surname. Notable people with the surname include:

- James Rasband (born 1963), American academic
- Ronald A. Rasband (born 1951), American LDS Church general authority
- Zen JF. Rasband (born 2011),
