= Harvey Taylor =

Harvey Taylor could refer to:

- Harvey L. Taylor, American educator from Utah
- M. Harvey Taylor, American politician from Pennsylvania
