= Education in Zion Gallery =

Exhibition space in Provo, Utah, USA

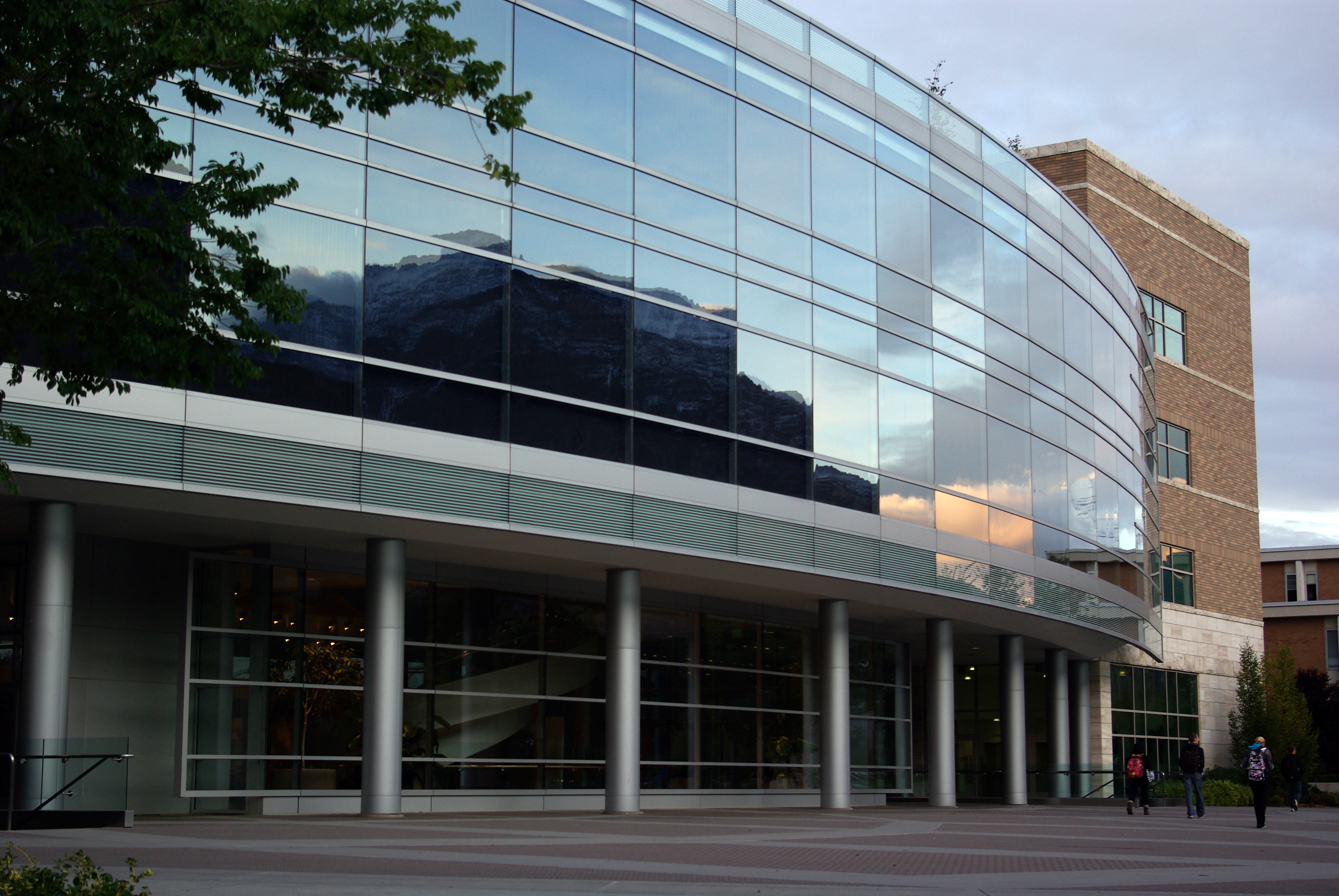
Exterior of the Education in Zion Gallery

Education in Zion is an exhibition space in the Joseph F. Smith Building at Brigham Young University (BYU) in Provo, Utah, United States. The gallery and permanent exhibition documents the history and heritage of education in the Church of Jesus Christ of Latter-day Saints (LDS Church) from Joseph Smith to the current Church Educational System (CES). Education in Zion includes stories, film, artwork, photographs, and letters. Temporary exhibits have shown student artwork, information about university services, the history of specific CES schools and colleges, and connections between academic subjects and scriptures. The gallery hosts a number of recurring events and lectures. Students viewing the exhibition have felt a renewed appreciation for their education.

== History of Education in Zion ==
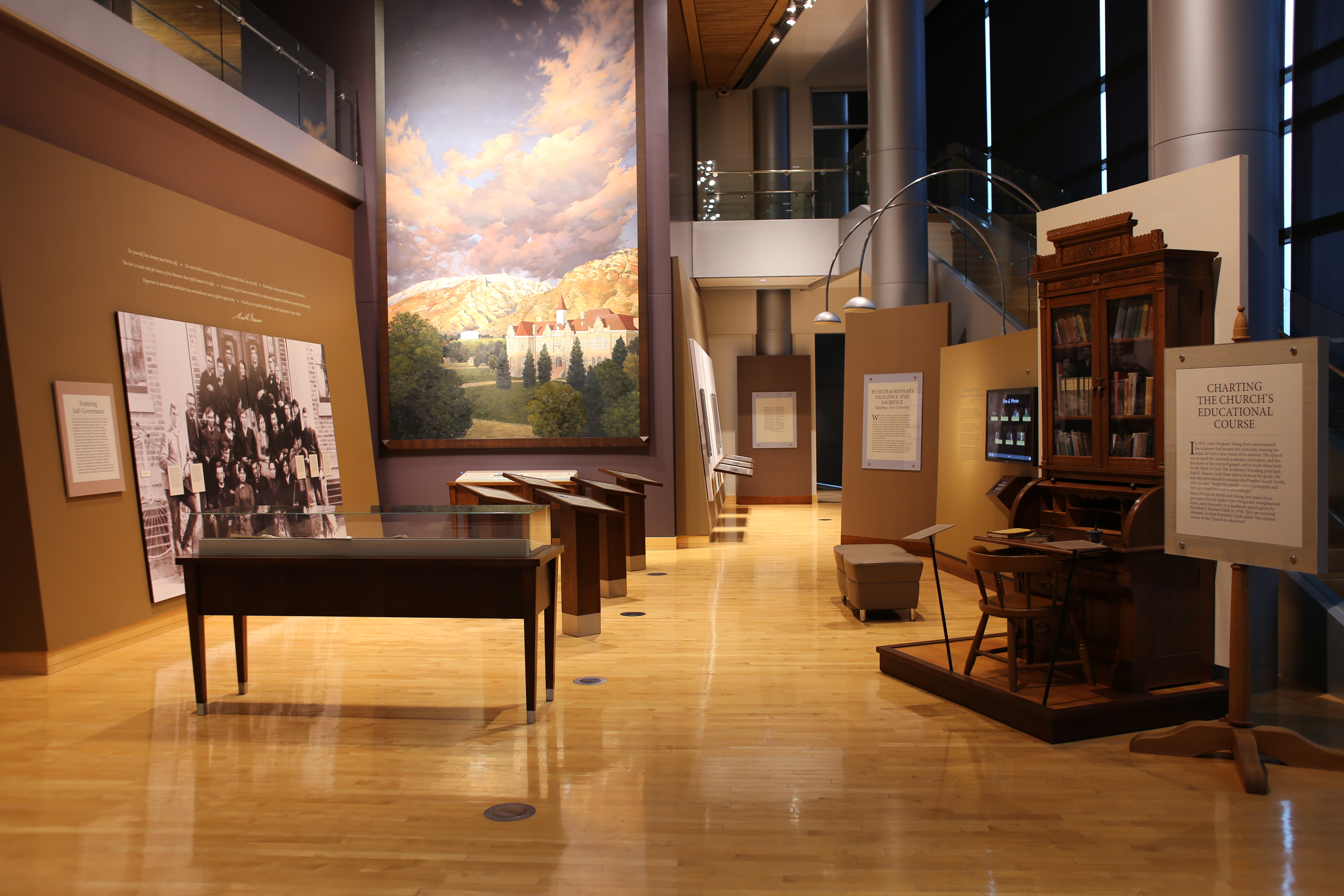
"Ascent of Church Education" permanent exhibit

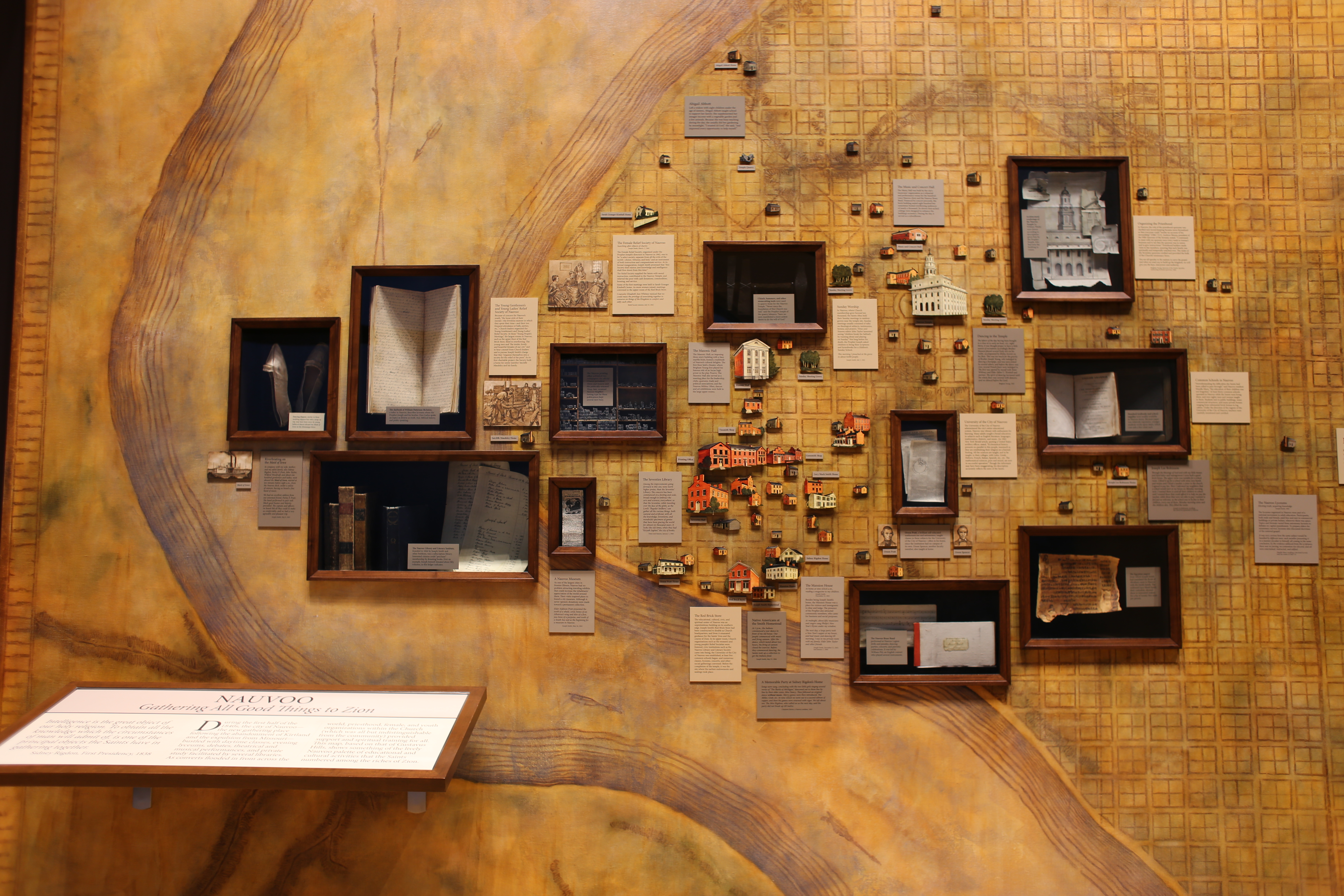
Detail of the Nauvoo, IL, exhibit

Over the course of eight years, C. Terry Warner, directed the planning and execution of the initial exhibition. The exhibition was planned to reside in the Joseph F. Smith building, and architects planned to have the gallery space on the east side of the building. BYU professor John Rosenberg described the gallery space as "an anchor that knots the work carried out in the square to the eternal verities of the gospel." Warner led a large team of BYU students and recent graduates who drew from various primary sources in their research for the exhibition about the founders of BYU and CES. Researchers used material from the Church History Library and the L. Tom Perry Special Collections, as well as the archives of the University of Utah, Utah State Historical Society, and the Daughters of the Utah Pioneers. After compiling the stories, the research team planned, wrote, designed, and installed the material in the exhibition. Education in Zion opened in fall 2008 and is under the direction of the Harold B. Lee Library. Ann Lambson was the curator from 2008 to 2011, with Heather Seferovich being the curator since 2011.

The permanent exhibits cover the history of the Church Educational System, including education in the early LDS church and the formation of LDS seminaries and institutes. Stories show the sacrifice and the innovation of church members who worked to support the LDS Church’s efforts to educate its members. BYU student employees work as educators in the gallery, giving tours and assisting in the planning of gallery programs. In 2009, the gallery had over 18,000 visitors, with over 28,000 in 2012. Many students who viewed the exhibition expressed greater appreciation for their education and felt inspired in their studies. New permanent exhibits were opened in 2019, focusing on how LDS Church programs have supported its members in gaining secular and spiritual knowledge as represented by the square and the circle, respectively.

== Temporary exhibits ==
Temporary exhibits in Education in Zion highlight collaborations with BYU colleges and institutions.

BYU art students have displayed work in the gallery in numerous exhibits. The gallery featured student art in the 2009 exhibit "Clarity" and the 2010 exhibit "Inheritance" showed works inspired by students's educational inheritance. Another student exhibit, "After Eve", showed art about women in education.

Exhibits have helped to promote the university mascot and university services. A 2015 exhibit on Cosmo the Cougar called "Cosmo: The Credentials of a Cougar" connected the BYU mascot's traits to the official aims of the BYU education; the following year "Cosmo:The Evolution of a Cougar" showed how Cosmo's costumes have changed over time. The exhibit on the university's Center for Service and Learning, "Y Serve: Come Serve with Me" emphasized the importance of service as one of BYU's official aims. Another exhibit called "Do Good Better: The Ballard Center for Economic Self-Reliance" underscored the importance of organizations like the Ballard Center and how students can contribute to such organizations.

Other temporary exhibits detail more of the CES's history. The exhibit, "Hastening the Work: The Story of Benemerito" educated visitors on the history of Benemerito De Las Americas, the private high school in Mexico run by the LDS church. In conjunction with the BYU College of Nursing in 2012, the gallery showed an exhibit on the nursing profession in history, with a special emphasis on LDS topics, like the additional verses of "Lord I Would Follow Thee" written for the College of Nursing. For the BYU College of Humanities's 50th anniversary, "50 Years of Fluency in the Human Conversation" showed the importance and history of the humanities at BYU.

Exhibits also connect academic subjects to scripture. "Bodies Filled With Light" paired research on scriptural references to the body with anatomical drawings from the 30th edition of Gray's Anatomy. The 2017 exhibit, "Emotions in the Scriptures," documents emotions in scripture and reflects on what these scriptures teach about emotions.

== Recurring events ==
The gallery has a number of recurring events during the fall and winter semesters: each Friday at noon, students perform live music in the gallery, and each Monday, special programs are prepared for small groups and promoted as Family Home Evening activities. As part of the Family Home Evening activities, there is a Christmas in Nauvoo program in December and "Vignettes of Black Saints" program in February. In 2016, the Christmas in Nauvoo program included activity stations with 19th-century folk dancing, refreshments, storytelling, and games. Since 2014, the gallery has participated in an annual "Night at the Museums" event in February, along with BYU's other museums. The gallery also celebrates Karl G. Maeser's birthday on January 16.

== Lectures ==
For Black history month in 2012, Margaret Blair Young gave a lecture on prominent Black saints, and in 2014 LeGrand Richards lectured on Karl G. Maeser for the Maeser birthday celebration. Other lecturers have included music professor Ron Saltmarsh, sociology professor Mikaela Dufur, and chemistry professor Joshua Price.
