= William F. Edwards =

American businessman (1906–1989)

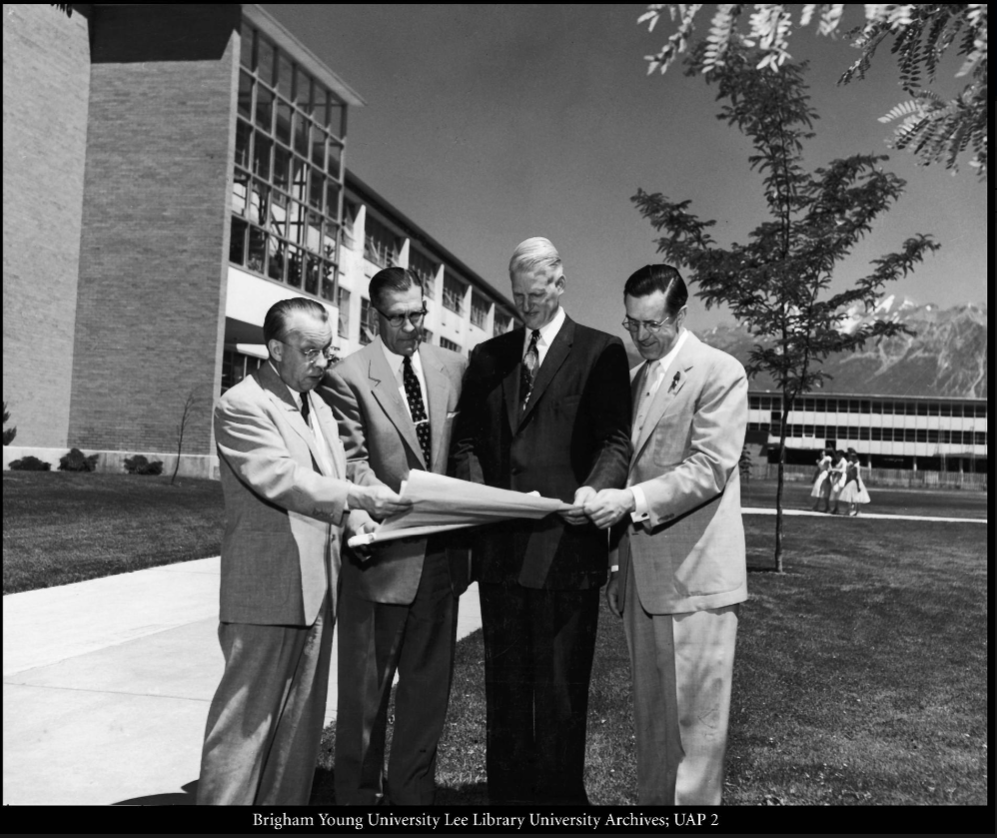
Wilkinson, left, with William F. Edwards, right

William F. Edwards (April 26, 1906 – 13 August 1989) was a businessman and educator who held the Driggs Chair of Finance at Brigham Young University (BYU).

Edwards was born in Emery, Utah. He studied at BYU from 1924 to 1928. He was president of his senior class and the vice president of the class was Catherine Eyring (a sister of Camilla Eyring and Henry Eyring). William and Catherine married in the Salt Lake Temple on 26 September 1929.

Edwards completed a master's degree at Columbia University and then received a doctor of commercial science degree from New York University. He was involved in several business endeavors, some involving mutual funds, over the next several years.

Ernest L. Wilkinson recruited Edwards to serve as the dean of BYU's commercial college beginning in January 1951. In 1953 Edwards was appointed BYU's vice president of finance and business administration. In January 1957 David O. McKay created the position of Financial Secretary to the First Presidency specifically to appoint Edwards to that position.

In 1959, while still serving as Financial Secretary to the First Presidency Edwards became the first chair of Utah's Coordinating Council on Higher Education.

In 1960 Edwards resigned his Church and government positions and returned to business ventures, specifically working for various banks. He also became a part-time faculty member at the University of Utah.

In 1971 Edwards retired from investment banking and was appointed to the Driggs Chair of Finance at BYU. By 1975 he was also the director of the Eyring Research Institute.

Edwards served as president of the New York Stake in the late from 1948 to 1950. He succeeded Howard S. Bennion in this position. He earlier had served as second counselor in the bishopric, a position that he had succeeded Carl J. Christensen in.

The Edwards were the parents of six children. Catherine served on the General Board of the LDS Primary from 1960 to 1970 and was the president of the BYU Emeritus Club (made up of emeritus faculty and also BYU alumni who graduated at least 50 years ago) for the 1989-1990 year.

== Sources ==
- Wilkinson, Ernest L., ed., Brigham Young University: The First 100 Years. (Provo: BYU Press, 1975) Vol. 4, p. 472-473.
- Deseret News, 16 July, 2006, obituary of Catherine
