= James Rasband =

American academic (born 1963)

James R. Rasband
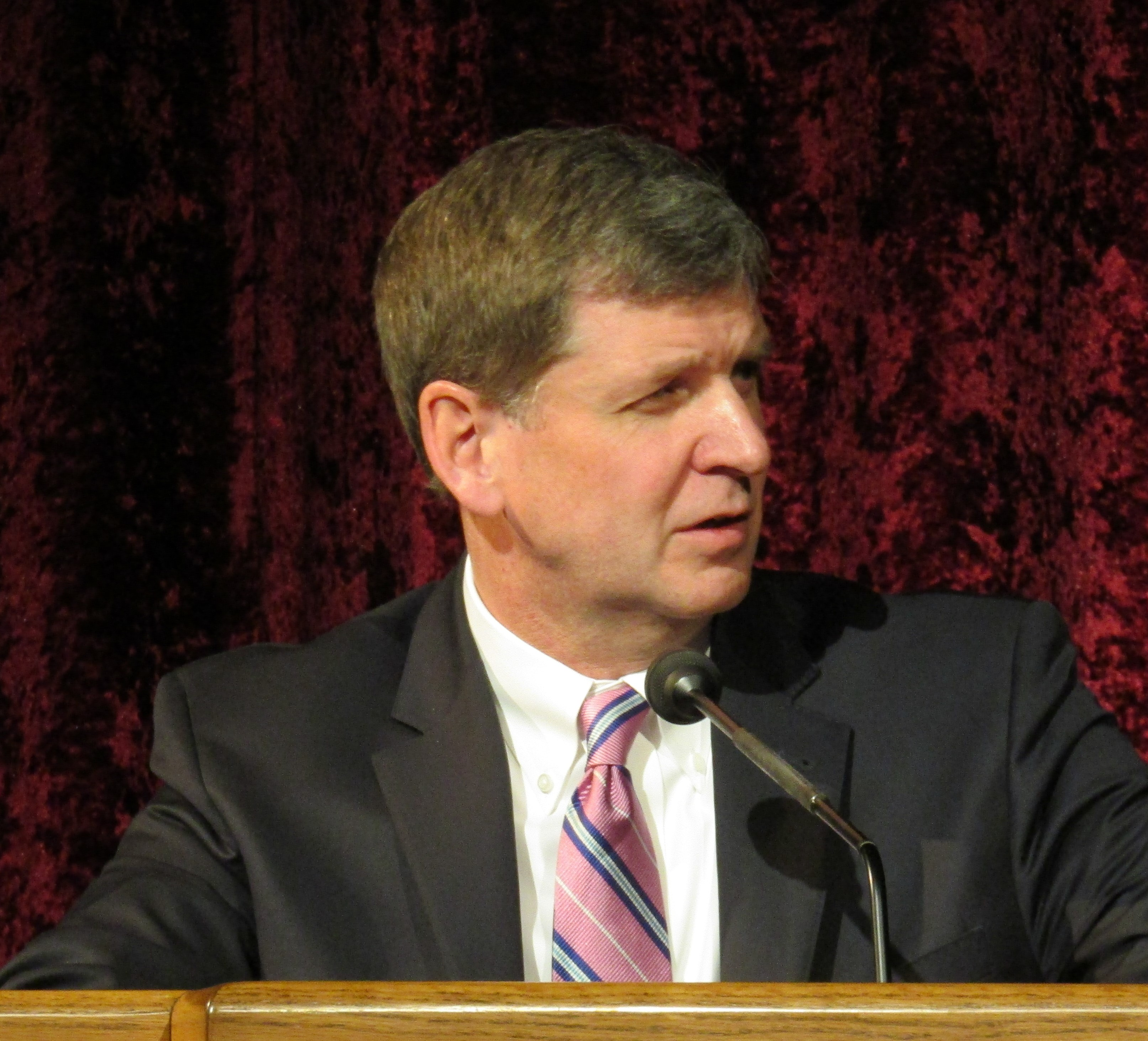
- Rasband in 2018

General Authority Seventy
- June 4, 2019
- Called by: Russell M. Nelson

Personal details
- Born: March 20, 1963 (age 63); Seattle, Washington, U.S.
- Education: Brigham Young University (BA); Harvard University (JD)
- Employer: Brigham Young University; Murdoch University; University of Queensland

James Richard Rasband (born March 20, 1963) is an American academic and religious leader who has been a general authority of the Church of Jesus Christ of Latter-day Saints (LDS Church) since April 2019. He was previously the academic vice president (AVP) at Brigham Young University (BYU) from June 2017 until shortly after he was called as a general authority. He also previously served as a professor and later as dean of BYU's J. Reuben Clark Law School (JRCLS).

== Legal and academic career ==
Rasband received a bachelor's degree from BYU (1986) and later graduated from Harvard Law School (1989), where he was an editor of the Harvard Law Review.

Following law school, Rasband clerked for Judge J. Clifford Wallace of the United States Court of Appeals for the Ninth Circuit. He then worked as a lawyer in Seattle for Perkins Coie. In 1995, he joined the faculty of the JRCLS. He has been a visiting professor in Australia at the University of Queensland and Murdoch University. Rasband is a specialist in public land law and natural resources law.

From 2004 to 2008, Rasband served as associate dean of the JRCLS. In 2008 and 2009, he was BYU's associate AVP for faculty. Rasband served as dean of the JRCLS from 2009 until 2016.

Rasband was succeeded as BYU's AVP by C. Shane Reese.

== LDS Church service ==
As a young man, Rasband was a full-time missionary in the church's Seoul Korea Mission. He served in the church as president of the Provo Utah YSA 8th Stake from 2011 to 2016. In April 2017, he was called as an area seventy. Rasband was sustained as a general authority seventy on April 6, 2019, at age fifty-six. He served in the presidency of the church's Asia North Area from 2020 until 2023, when he was named assistant executive director in the church's temple department. On March 11, 2026, the church announced his appointment as the new commissioner of the Church Educational System, effective April 1. Rasband replaced Clark G. Gilbert, who was appointed to the Quorum of the Twelve Apostles the month before.

== Personal life ==
Rasband and his wife, Mary Williams, are the parents of four children.

== Additional reading ==
- BYU bio of Rasband
- BYU news announcement of Rasband's appointment as dean of the J. Reuben Clark Law School
- "New dean for BYU Law School", Church News, April 21, 2009
