= Earl C. Crockett =

American economist

Earl Clarkson Crockett (1903–1975) was an American economist who served as acting president of Brigham Young University (BYU) from 1963 to 1964 while Ernest L. Wilkinson was running for the United States Senate. Prior to this Crockett has been BYU's academic vice president.

Crockett was born in Preston, Idaho. In 1925 Crockett married Della B. Comish at the Salt Lake Temple, with the wedding performed by George F. Richards. After his marriage he and Della taught at a small school near Grace, Idaho, for a year before he resumed his studies at the University of Utah. Crockett received a bachelor's degree from the University of Utah in 1928. Crockett received a Ph.D. in economics at the University of California, Berkeley in 1931. Among other schools, early in his career Crockett taught at the University of North Dakota and the University of Maryland. He was the principal economist for the United States War Production Board during World War II.

Crockett was a professor at the University of Colorado prior to his becoming academic vice president at BYU in 1957. He also taught some economics classes during this time. At the University of Colorado he had been chairman of the department of social sciences. After serving as acting president, Crockett returned to serving as academic vice president until his retirement in 1968. He then spent three years teaching economics at BYU.

Crockett was a Latter-day Saint.

== Sources ==
- Wilkins, Ernest L., ed., Brigham Young University: The First One Hundred Years (Provo, BYU Press, 1976) p. 194.
- Crockett Family Website
- history of the University of Colorado sociology department
