= William E. Berrett =

American writer

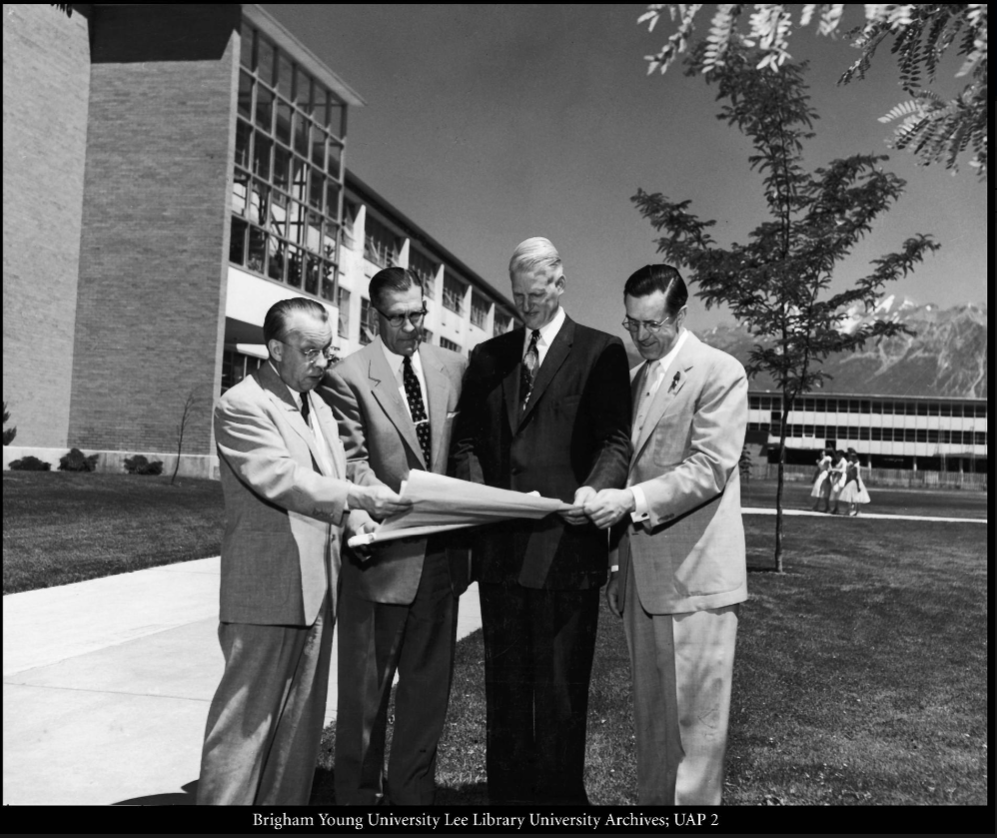
William E. Berrett, in the dark suit, with Wilkinson and two other BYU Vice Presidents.

William Edwin "Ed" Berrett (June 2, 1902 – November 30, 1993) was a vice president at Brigham Young University (BYU) and a Latter-day Saint author.

== Early life and education ==
Berrett was raised in southern Salt Lake County in what is today Cottonwood Heights, Utah. He attended Jordan High School. He received an undergraduate education from the University of Utah. Berrett graduated from there in 1924 and then worked for a time as the principal of the seminary of the Church of Jesus Christ of Latter-day Saints (LDS Church) in Roosevelt, Utah.

He received a law degree from the University of Utah in 1933. He also did graduate studies at BYU from 1927 to 1933. In 1926, Berrett married Eleanore Louise Callister in the Salt Lake Temple.

== Career ==
By 1936, Berrett began writing textbooks to be used in the LDS Church's schools and was an editor for the Church Educational System's (CES) curriculum development. Berrett's most notable work was The Restored Church, a text to teach the history of the LDS Church; the book went through at least 16 editions. He also compiled with Alma Burton Readings in LDS Church History.

In 1943, Berrett was appointed special prosecutor for the Office of Price Administration for the Utah Division. In 1946, he became an assistant U.S. attorney in Alaska Territory. He left government employment in 1947 and became a lawyer in private practice in Salt Lake City. He also was on the editorial staff of the Deseret News.

From 1935 to 1953, Berrett was a member of the Deseret Sunday School Union General Board.

In 1947, Berrett joined the BYU faculty as a professor of Church History. In 1951, he was one of the key figures in getting an ROTC unit located at BYU. He also worked closely with Ernest L. Wilkinson in recruiting more faculty to BYU. In 1953, Berrett was appointed vice president of both BYU and CES.

From 1962 to 1965 Berrett served as chairman of the Utah Committee on Children and Youth.

In 1965, the LDS Church's seminary and institute programs were separated from the BYU administration. Berrett was appointed head of seminaries, institutes and all church-run colleges and schools (other than BYU). In 1972, Berrett retired and worked on writing a three-volume history of CES. This was not published but was later re-worked into a one-volume history published in 1988 as A Miracle in Week-day Religious Education.

== Personal life ==
Berrett and his wife, Eleanor, had four children.

For the last two decades or so of his life, Berrett served as a patriarch in the LDS Church. In his book titled 'The Church and the Negroid People', pages 16–17, he expresses his opinions on African-Americans that may sound offensive to a 21st-century reader.
