= Academia Juárez =

High school in Chihuahua, Mexico

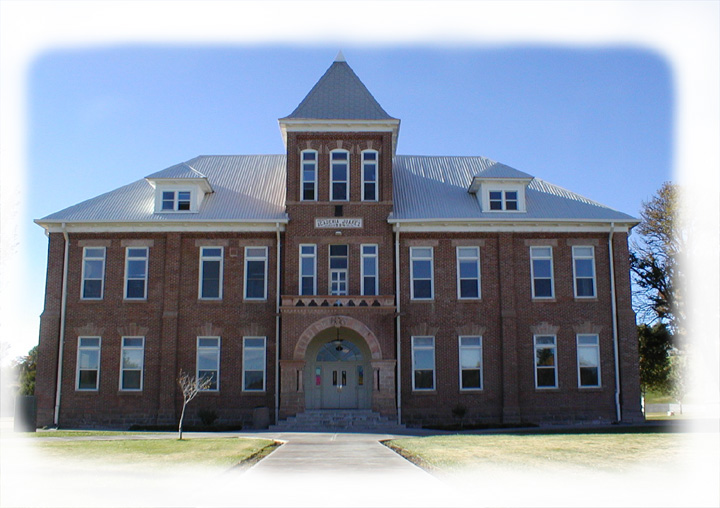

Information
- Former name: Juarez Stake Academy
- Religious affiliation: The Church of Jesus Christ of Latter-day Saints
- Established: 20 September 1897; 129 years ago
- Enrollment: 357 (2022-2023)
- Language: English; Spanish
- Website: www.academiajuarez.net

Academia Juárez, previously known as Juarez Stake Academy, is the oldest private high school owned by the Church of Jesus Christ of Latter-day Saints (LDS Church) and is located in Colonia Juárez, Chihuahua, Mexico. It is also the last operating school owned by the LDS church in Mexico. Academia Juárez opened on September 20, 1897 with 291 students and follows a dual-language program that is unique in the country. The dual-language program starts at K-6 in two elementary schools: Colonia Dublán and Colonia Juárez and continues from 7th to 12th grade in both English and Spanish languages.

During the 2022–2023 school year, 357 students were enrolled in classes. The majority of students are Latter Day Saints. In the 2012-2013 school year, approximately 81% of those are Latter-day Saints; most of the remaining students (17%) are affiliated with the Catholic faith, with 2% from other faiths, each of whom pays higher tuition than the students who are LDS Church members. To enhance expectations in academic levels, the academy maintains a highly competitive admissions criteria for non-Latter-day Saints who undergo an intensive round of interviews during the admission process. Academia Juárez's athletic mascot is the Lobos (wolves in Spanish).

== See also ==
- Church College of New Zealand
- Church Educational System
