= Ron Saltmarsh =

American composer

Ron Saltmarsh is an American composer, producer, guitarist and performer. He has written many TV and movie scores, and also written many country music songs.

Saltmarsh was born in Portland, OR in 1962 and grew up on a ranch in Beavercreek, OR. He moved to Provo, UT in 1980 to attend college at Brigham Young University.

Saltmarsh served as a missionary for the Church of Jesus Christ of Latter-day Saints (LDS Church) in Atlanta, Georgia.

Saltmarsh has a bachelor's degree in music from Brigham Young University (BYU) as well as an MBA from the Marriott School of Management. Among those he studied under at BYU was K. Newell Dayley and mentored by Sam Cardon. Saltmarsh was part of the Young Ambassadors and the jazz ensemble Synthesis while at BYU.

In 1993 Saltmarsh became a vice president of Flashpoint productions and while there composed music for many SEGA and PC platform games.

In 1995 he moved to Nashville, TN where he worked for 615 Music Productions as a freelance composer and producer. He was one of the lead composer for the music of A&E's Biography Series. He also was the composer for the thriller movie SIGMA. He has also done arranging for the band Diamond Rio as well as many other music groups. He has performed with Marie Osmond, The Nashville Tribute Band, and many other cover and specialty types of groups. He regularly plays with the country group Joshua Creek. He has released two contemporary jazz CD's with his friend, fellow BYU graduate and keyboardist for Diamond Rio, Dan Truman

Since 2011, he has been an associate teaching professor of music at BYU over the Commercial Music Degree.

Saltmarsh was a bishop of an LDS Church ward in Nashville for several years.

Saltmarsh married Calene Cox in 1987 and they have 4 children.

== Sources ==
- Bio from Saltmarsh's website
- Article on Saltmarsh and Truman collaboration
- Meridian Magazine article on Mormon Musicians in Nashville
- "Music City: LDS top charts in Nashville", Church News, June 10, 2000
