= C. Shane Reese =

American statistician and educational administrator (born 1971)

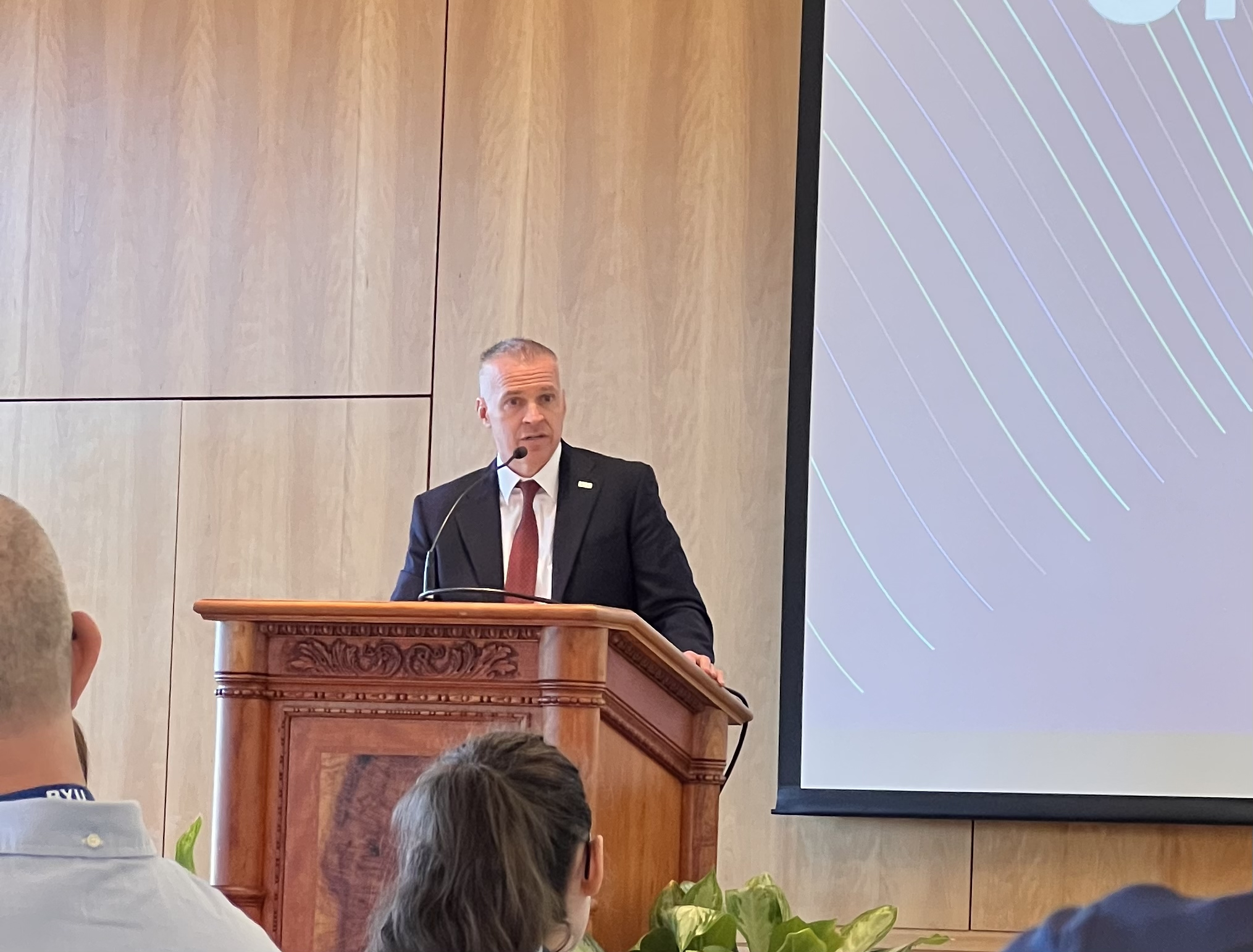
- Reese in 2023

14th President of Brigham Young University
- Incumbent
- Assumed office May 1, 2023
- Preceded by: Kevin J Worthen

Personal details
- Born: Christopher Shane Reese; February 9, 1971 (age 55) Logan, Utah, U.S.
- Spouse: Wendy Wood
- Children: 3
- Education: Brigham Young University (BS, MS); Texas A&M University (PhD)
- Profession: Academic administrator, professor of statistics
- Website: BYU's Office of the President

Christopher Shane Reese is an American statistician, academic administrator, and fourteenth president of Brigham Young University (BYU). At BYU, he previously served as academic vice president (AVP), dean of the College of Physical and Mathematical Sciences (CPMS), and professor of statistics.

== Academic career ==
Reese has bachelor's and master's degrees from BYU and a doctoral degree in statistics from Texas A&M University. His research areas include sports analytics, Bayesian hierarchical models and optimal experimental design. In 2013, he became an elected fellow of the American Statistical Association, in the section on statistics in defense and national security.

Reese has done studies using statistical models to predict behavior of aging nuclear weapons, as well as solar storm mapping, whale activity mapping, and many studies applying statistics to sports. Before joining the BYU faculty, he worked at the Los Alamos National Laboratory as a technical staff member.

He received BYU's Young Scholar Award in 2004 and its Karl G. Maeser Excellence in Teaching Award in 2010.

From 2017 to 2019, he served as dean of BYU's CPMS.

On March 21, 2023, Jeffrey R. Holland announced in a campus devotional that Reese would become BYU's fourteenth president, effective May 1. At the time, Reese was serving as BYU's AVP. On September 19, 2023, Reese was inaugurated by D. Todd Christofferson and Dallin H. Oaks, both members of BYU's board of trustees and Latter-day Saint apostles.

== Personal life ==
Reese grew up in Albuquerque, New Mexico, and was raised by a single mother.

From 1990 to 1992, he served as a missionary for the Church of Jesus Christ of Latter-day Saints in Taiwan.

He is married to Wendy Wood. They have three children, all of whom attended BYU.

Academic offices
Preceded by Kevin J Worthen	14th President of Brigham Young University; 2023 – present	Incumbent
