= Harvey L. Taylor =

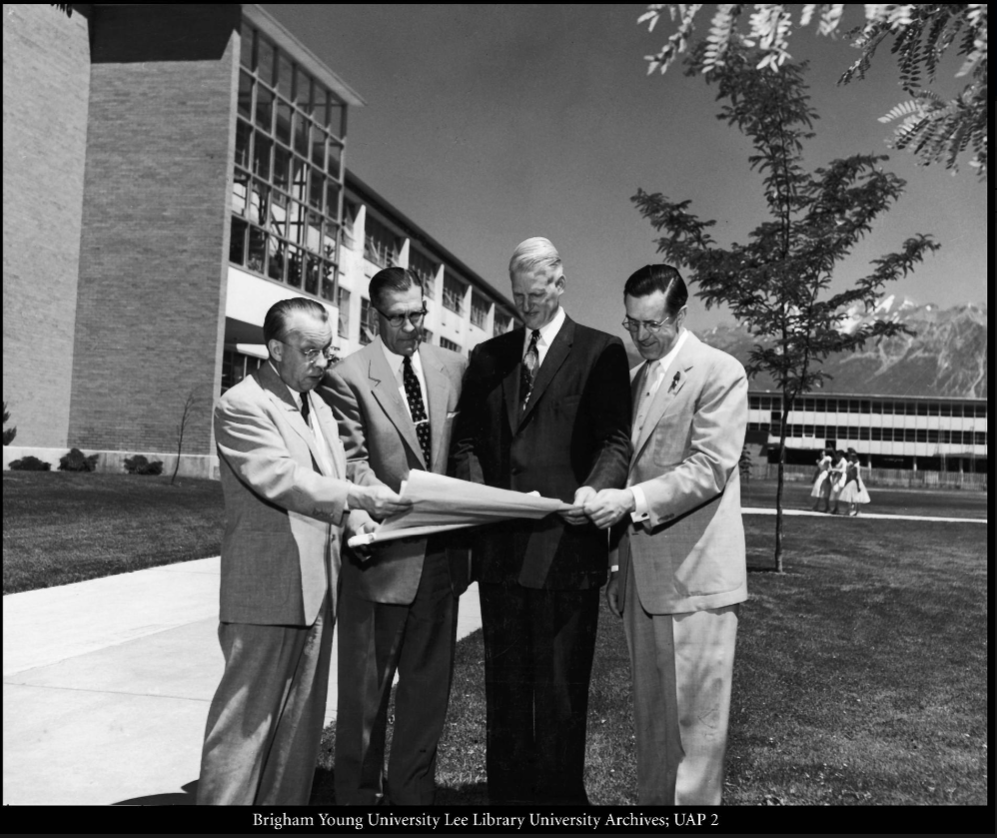
Ernest Wilkinson, left, with Harvey Taylor, next to him

Harvey L. Taylor was an administrator over all schools other than Brigham Young University (BYU) within the Church Educational System of the Church of Jesus Christ of Latter-day Saints (LDS Church) from 1964 until 1970. He was vice president of Brigham Young University (BYU) from 1957 until 1964, when he became acting Chancellor of the Unified School System.

Taylor was a native of Harrisville, Utah and studied at what is today Weber State University. He received a bachelor's degree from the University of Utah in 1921 and an MA from Columbia University in 1925. Taylor then taught at Weber, followed by serving as president of Gila Academy (the predecessor for Eastern Arizona College). He then was principal of Mesa Union High School and later superintendent of the Mesa Public Schools.

Taylor became an administrative assistant to Ernest L. Wilkinson at Brigham Young University (BYU) in 1952. Taylor also held supervisory roles over Ricks College. During Wilkinson's campaign for Senate in 1964, Taylor was both interim president at BYU and the Chancellor of the Unified School System. After Wilkinson's return to BYU, he resumed his job as BYU president, while Taylor continued to oversee non-BYU schools. Taylor's position was renamed Administrator of the Unified Church School System. Neal A. Maxwell replaced Taylor in 1970, and Taylor retired in 1971.

== Early and young adult life ==
Born August 28, 1894, in Harrisville, Weber County, Utah, Harvey was the first of two children born to Harvey Daniel Taylor and Letty Saunders. His parents were twenty-three and nineteen, respectively, at the time of Taylor's birth. Taylor never knew his biological father, who died suddenly of typhoid fever when Taylor was ten months old. Seven months after his father's death, Taylor's sister was born. During those first few years, Letty earned twenty-five cents a day to clean laundry for a neighbor. The family was mainly reared and supported by Taylor's grandmother.

In 1899, Taylor's mother married Samuel S. Ferrin and the family moved into the small Ferrin farm home in Pleasant View, Weber County. In 1902, Taylor was sent to live with one of Mr. Ferrin's relatives eight miles away, so he could attend school. A combination of emotional stresses caused Taylor to perform poorly academically: he recalls being unhappy in an unfamiliar home and being bullied at school because of his hand-me-down clothes. Instead of playing outside during free time, Taylor stayed inside with his teacher. Taylor attributes the spark of his lifelong academic interest to that quality time he spent with his first school teacher. In April of that school year, Taylor was sent back to Harrisville to live with his grandmother to finish school, for which he was very grateful.

Taylor experienced more success in Harrisville. His new teacher made him repeat the third grade, and his grandmother helped him to understand his schoolwork. Taylor completed the third and fourth grade in Harrisville, then moved back to Pleasant View with his family. There was no local high school, so after graduating the eighth grade, Taylor attended LDS Weber Academy, present-day Weber State University. He signed up to study agriculture, even though he didn't know what profession he wanted to pursue. At Weber Academy, Taylor was student body president his senior year, active in sports, and worked on both the school's annual and newspaper. Taylor took two years of schooling off to work to support his family, but he graduated by the time he was twenty.Also at Weber Academy, Taylor dated Lucelle Rhees, daughter of Reuben Rhees and Rebecca Tucker. Lucelle was an author, teacher, and member of the LDS Primary Board. Reuben Rhees owned the most prominent bee business in Utah. After dating exclusively, the two were married on May 18, 1916. Taylor had few possessions when they were first married, and had to borrow 160 dollars just to furnish their apartment.

== College and teaching ==
Harvey and Lucelle briefly moved to Provo, Utah, where he wanted to attend Brigham Young University (BYU). Most of the men on campus were gone because of the first World War, and according to Harvey, the campus itself was only offering credit through examinations while their classrooms were closed. The Taylors moved back to Pleasant View that same year. Back home, Harvey worked for his wife's father in the family bee industry.

=== Post-high school education, and Weber Academy ===
Taylor was offered a partnership with Mr. Rhees, but Harvey declined to pursue his aspirations of becoming a teacher. Taylor set his sights on the University of Utah for his undergraduate degree. The family moved to Salt Lake City, Utah. Unable to afford housing, Lucelle's father bought them a house in Salt Lake City. The Taylor's first child was a son named Darrell, born in 1917, followed by a daughter named Molliemae, born 1920. While on a hike with the Boy Scouts during his final semester at the University of Utah, Taylor suffered a severe appendicitis attack. Taylor was home, in recovery, for seven of the twelve weeks for his academic term. For the remaining five weeks of the semester, Harvey and Lucelle worked through each night to prepare him for graduation. Taylor graduated on time, with degrees in English and Psychology in 1921. After receiving his diploma, Harvey began teaching at Weber Academy in Ogden, Utah. He taught for four years.

Taylor studied at Columbia University in New York City for his master's degree. He stayed in New York City on his own, as he could only afford to live in New York by himself for one year. He finished his courses, research, and thesis in 1925. Lucelle and their children lived with her parents while Harvey attended Columbia. Afterward, Taylor moved back to Utah, where he worked three summer months at the Rhees' family bee business. That fall, Taylor began teaching again at Weber College, formerly Weber Academy. At Weber College, Taylor met Ernest L. Wilkinson and J. Willard Marriott, after whom BYU's Marriott Center is named. Wilkinson and Marriott were respective student body presidents, and Wilkinson graduated with honors.

=== Gila Junior College and Mesa Union High School ===
Harvey Taylor was president of Gila Junior College (now Eastern Arizona College) in Thatcher, Arizona. Adam S. Bennion, Commissioner of Education for the Church of Jesus Christ of Latter-day Saints (LDS Church), asked Taylor to be president of Gila Junior College. At first, Taylor refused the offer, but accepted after viewing the deplorable condition of the campus. The journey to Thatcher, which included driving over some undeveloped dirt trails, took nine days. Gila College opened smoothly, and Taylor directed operations for six years. When the Great Depression hit the United States, the LDS Church stated that it could no longer afford any of its junior colleges. The Gila school board appointed Spencer W. Kimball and Taylor to visit the towns in Graham County and raise interest in Gila College. The two traveled with a little college band, showed posters, and gave speeches. After the events, the community voted in a five-to-three ratio to publicly fund Gila College.

Although Taylor's work at Gila seemed to be done, he stayed another year at the request of the board to help with the transition to the Gila community. He then accepted a position as superintendent of Mesa Union High School, where he received a significant pay increase. The Arizona State College at Tempe gave Taylor an honorary Juris Doctor degree in May 1956.

=== Brigham Young University and the Church School System ===
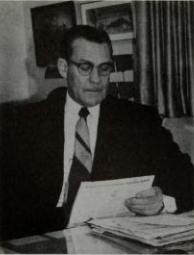
Harvey L. Taylor pictured in The Banyan 1955, BYU yearbook, shortly after arrival at BYU from Mesa Union High School.

In 1951, Ernest L. Wilkinson became president of Brigham Young University (BYU). He invited Taylor to work at BYU, to which Taylor first declined. Wilkinson kept trying to convince Taylor to work at BYU, and after a year, he acquiesced. Taylor requested that his pay be equal to or higher than what he was receiving at Mesa Union High School. He also asked for the position of Vice President of BYU. A salary was arranged, and the school board allowed him to have the title of Executive Assistant to the President. An announcement was made on January 5, 1953, that Taylor would transfer to Provo, Utah. Once in Provo, Taylor worked from the Karl G. Maeser Building while the new administration office was under construction. Taylor was made chairman of the Administration Building when its construction was complete. While at BYU, Taylor and Wilkinson shared different philosophies on education, but Taylor remained a supportive administrator to Wilkinson.

Taylor carried a heavy workload during his administration at BYU. He was in charge of the Junior College Program, which included Brigham Young University-Hawaii (BYU-H), Ensign College, and Brigham Young University-Idaho (BYU-I), formerly called the Church College of Hawaii, LDS Business College, and Ricks College, respectively. Taylor was also in charge of the Administrative Council and the Dean's Council, among other things.

When Wilkinson resigned his position to run for Senate in January 1964, Earl C. Crockett and Taylor took on Wilkinson's responsibilities. The executive committee determined that Taylor would be the "Chancellor of the Unified Church School System" whose jurisdiction encompassed BYU and all of the other educational institutions within the Church Educational System. The position was later clarified as a Commissioner of Education who would ensure that BYU did not get "preferential treatment from the Church." After Wilkinson's loss in the Senate race, President McKay invited him back to BYU to fill both positions, but the executive committee determined that Taylor should continue his duties over all church educational institutions, with the title of "administrator" instead of "chancellor", probably to reflect that the position was not one within the university. Hugh B. Brown informed Taylor of his appointment, but with no specific instructions on what he should do. His appointment was an interim one. According to Gary Bergera, the designation of "interim" was to "pacify McKay's concerns that a permanent appointment would be unfair to Wilkinson".

Taylor's new position oversaw all the LDS Church's seminaries and institutes, schools in South America, schools in the Pacific Islands, Tonga and Samoa and Western and American Samoa, schools in New Zealand, the Papeete, Tahiti, and Hawaii. In this position, Taylor traveled an average of 100,000 miles a year. The program had 300,000 students, 5,000 teachers, and 4,000 staff members. The budget was forty-five thousand dollars annually. After six years, Neal A. Maxwell replaced Taylor in this position in 1970, and BYU was added to his jurisdiction. Maxwell's position was renamed Church Commissioner of Education. Taylor worked with Maxwell for his first year of employment to ease the transition. At Maxwell's request, Taylor completed his own history of LDS Church education. Three copies of his informal history were made: one for Neal A. Maxwell, one for the LDS Church Archives, and one for himself, which he would later donate to BYU. With the completion of this project, Taylor retired after fifty-two years in education.

== Personal life ==
Around 1930–31, while Taylor taught at Gila College, two of his children (Darrell and Betty) contracted typhoid fever. Darrell in particular was very sick and had to be hospitalized in Miami, Arizona with a doctor who specialized in typhoid fever. Darrell was unconscious for thirty-two days. The doctor called Taylor to tell him that Darrell wouldn't survive much longer, and that Harvey should come right away. Taylor arrived to find Darrell conscious for the first time in over a month. Taylor credits the prayers of the church councilmen back in Arizona to have provided the miracle.

Taylor was an active member of the LDS Church since boyhood. From the time he was fifteen, he recalls participating in leadership roles for Mutual (an LDS youth program) and Sunday School. Once he was married, he served as superintendent of the Ogden stake Sunday school, as well as superintendent for stake Mutual Improvement Association (Mutual), and stake religion class. In Thatcher, Arizona, Harvey served in the stake high council, was stake superintendent for Mutual and taught Sunday school. He served in the Arizona governor's youth council, safety council, Mesa City health council, and Mesa planning board. For sixteen years, Taylor was chairman to the Mesa Parks and Playground board, and even has a recreational field named after him: "Taylor Field." Taylor received the first "most valuable citizen" award from Mesa, as well as the Arizona State Farmer Award and the Phoenix Rotary "Orchid Award" for his service to the youth. Taylor taught Sunday School for a total of thirty-two years, and taught Mutual for about half that many years. Taylor participated in Boy Scouts for fifty years and received the Silver Beaver.

Harvey and Lucelle Taylor had one son and three daughters: Darrell, Mollimae, Janyce, Betty. Darrell died June 10, 1963, at age 46, in a truck accident. Two of Darrell's children were also injured in the accident, but survived.

=== Retirement ===
Taylor put extensive work into the accuracy and quality of his and Lucelle's journals. Lucelle kept a detailed journal, but was unable to write after 1970. She dictated to Harvey from then on, and Taylor worked on their compilation and binding. There are eight volumes to Harvey Taylor's personal journal: one volume for each decade of life. Lucelle died on April 4, 1977. Taylor died on November 15, 1983.

== Sources ==
- Ernest L. Wilkinson and W. Cleon Skousen, ed., Brigham Young University: A School of Destiny (Provo: BYU Press, 1976) p. 449, 535
