= Church Educational System =

Educational system of the Church of Jesus Christ of Latter-day Saints

- Type: Elementary, secondary, and higher education
- Established: 1877
- Religious affiliation: The Church of Jesus Christ of Latter-day Saints
- Commissioner: James R. Rasband
- Faculty: c. 50,000
- Students: c. 700,000
- Location: Worldwide
- Campus: 3 universities; 1 college; 1 all-online certificate and degree program; 15 elementary and secondary schools; 8,039 seminary and institute programs
- Headquarters: Temple Square, Salt Lake City, Utah
- Website: Church Education

The Church Educational System (CES) of the Church of Jesus Christ of Latter-day Saints (LDS Church) consists of several institutions that provide religious and secular education for both Latter-day Saint and non–Latter-day Saint elementary, secondary, and post-secondary students and adult learners. Over 1 million individuals were enrolled in CES programs in over 180 countries with over 150,000 higher education students worldwide in 2023. CES has grown significantly since 2011, when it had approximately 700,000 students, largely through increased international participation and expansion of BYU–Pathway Worldwide (BYU–PW) and Seminaries and Institutes of Religion programs. CES courses of study are separate and distinct from religious instruction provided through wards (local congregations). James R. Rasband, a general authority, has been the CES Commissioner since April 1, 2026.

== Background ==
The University of Deseret was established in 1850 to supervise other public schools in the territory. Public taxation instituted in 1851 supported these schools, which were organized by LDS Church wards, with their teacher employed by the local bishop. These early public schools often used church meetinghouses as their schoolroom. While Utah's colonization was started by members of the LDS Church, twenty percent of the territory's residents were not Latter-day Saints by 1880. This minority wished for a state government that was filled less by church members, including public schools that were independent of the LDS Church. Non-Latter-day Saint schools petitioned for and received federal aid, and the first Protestant missionary school opened in Salt Lake City in 1867. From 1869 to 1890, there were 90 non-Latter-day Saint schools from other Christian denominations. Over half of their students were LDS Church members.

The Edmunds–Tucker Act of 1887 prohibited use of "sectarian" or religious books in the classroom and changed the district superintendent position to one that was appointed instead of elected. The Free School Act of 1890 established that public schools would be "free from sectarian control." This legislation separated the LDS Church from the public schools. Wilford Woodruff disliked the new public schools, calling them a "great evil," and created the academies system and an after-school program of religious classes for children. The first Church Board of Education was formed in 1888 to supervise the academies. The board consisted of Wilford Woodruff, Lorenzo Snow, George Q. Cannon, Karl G. Maeser, Horace S. Eldredge, Willard Young, George W. Thatcher, Anthon H. Lund, and Amos Howe. Thirty academies were formed between 1888 and 1895, but many families could not afford the tuition of the private academies. A few academies became junior colleges and trained teachers, and some continued as private Church-sponsored high schools. Most academies closed within the decade due to the depressions of 1893 and 1896. Some of the stronger academies persisted before being dissolved during church education cutbacks in the 1920s. Release-time seminary classes started in 1912 at Granite High School in Salt Lake City, and grew to serve 26,000 students by 1930.

== Seminaries and Institutes of Religion ==
In 2014, the Seminaries and Institutes programs served over 744,000 students in seminaries and institutes in 137 countries.

=== Seminaries ===
In the LDS Church, the word seminary refers to religious education programs designed for secondary students. These are programs of religious education for youth aged 14–18 that accompany the students' secular education. In areas with large concentrations of Latter-day Saints, such as in and around the Mormon Corridor in the United States, instruction is offered on a released time basis during the normal school day in meetinghouses, or facilities built specifically for seminary programs, adjacent to public schools. Released-time seminary classes are generally taught by full-time employees. In areas with smaller LDS populations early-morning or home-study seminary programs are offered. Early-morning seminary classes are held daily before the normal school day in private homes or in meetinghouses and are taught by volunteer teachers. Home-study seminary classes are offered where geographic dispersion of students is so great that it is not feasible to meet on a daily basis. Home-study seminary students study daily, but meet only once a week as a class. Home-study classes are usually held in connection with weekly youth fellowship activities on a weekday evening.

The seminary program provides extensive study of theology, using as texts the church's "standard works" (Old Testament, New Testament, Book of Mormon and Doctrine and Covenants) throughout the school week, in addition to normal Sunday classes. The four courses are taught, one per year, on a rotating basis. Historically, seminary students were encouraged to study each scriptural text on their own time and to memorize a total of 100 scriptural passages or "scriptural mastery" verses during their participation in the four-year program. In 2016, the focus turned from scripture mastery to doctrinal mastery. For many years, the curriculum has followed the standard school year for most seminary students. However, in March 2019, the LDS Church announced that the curriculum would be changed to align with the home-centered, church-supported curriculum changes announced in the church's October 2018 general conference.

=== Institutes of Religion ===
Students who enroll in post-secondary education and young adults ages 18–35 receive religious education through institutes of religion. CES Institutes served over 350,000 students worldwide in 2005. Many colleges throughout the United States either have institute buildings or active programs near their campuses. Sometimes classes occur in ward buildings, office buildings, or private homes. Teachers can be either volunteers or paid employees.

The first Institute of Religion was established in northern Idaho at Moscow, adjacent to the University of Idaho. Currently the largest enrollment is at Utah State University in Logan, Utah. The largest enrollment outside the state of Utah is at Idaho State University in Pocatello, Idaho.

== Elementary and secondary schools ==
CES institutions provide elementary and secondary schools in Mexico and in the Pacific Islands. Church schools expanded while David O. McKay was president of the LDS Church, with new schools opening in New Zealand, Tonga, Samoa, and other Pacific islands. The schools relied on volunteers.

=== Mexico ===
In 1886, the Mexican state of Chihuahua housed an outpost for Latter-day Saints fleeing anti-polygamy laws in the US. In an attempt to escape persecution, more than three hundred Latter-day Saints settled in nine different communities in Chihuahua and Sonora. The Academia Juárez was opened in 1887.

The Juárez Stake Academy was first established in September 1897 with 291 students. Located within the church's Colonia Juárez in Chihuahua, the school was similar to academies in the Utah territory and provided English-language instruction intended for "an Anglo population." The school was not closed when other academies were closed in the 1920s and 1930s, likely because public school education in Mexico during the Mexican Revolution was inadequate. Settlers from Utah Territory remained isolated and aloof from native Mexicans, celebrating American holidays and teaching in English. Moises de la Pena, a Mexican academic, declared that the school was an "illegal privilege" in 1950. The school is still in operation, with 418 students as of the 2012–2013 school year, and approximately 80% of the students are members of the church. The school now utilizes a unique dual-language program beginning in kindergarten and continuing through high school.

The internationalization of the LDS Church in the 1950s and 1960s corresponded with an increase in native Mexican membership. Scholarships for these members to Juárez Academy encouraged its diversification. Additionally, the Church expanded its educational program. It ran elementary schools in various places in Mexico and opened a high school in Mexico City, Centro Escolar Benemerito De Las Americas, in 1964. The curriculum changed in accordance with Mexican law, with off-campus religious instruction. Campus culture changed as schools celebrated Mexican holidays and included Mexican culture in its curriculum. In 1967, Hispanic students made up 50% of the student body. Benemerito De Las Americas closed in 2013 when the campus was converted into a Missionary Training Center. As of 2014, 400 students attended Juárez Academy. Most students are Latin American, and about seventy-five percent are LDS.

=== Pacific Islands ===
Initially, schools in the Pacific Islands were run by missionaries and directed by mission presidents. The Pacific Board of Education was organized in June 1957 to oversee the schools in the Pacific Islands. Wendell B. Mendenhall was the first chairman of the board, with Owen J. Cook as executive secretary. The Pacific Board of Education approved faculty, wrote policies, and defined budgets. Each school in Pacific Islands has its own president/principal and administrative board. The schools under the Pacific Board of Education were transferred to the Church Board of Education in 1964. In the 1970s, under the leadership of Neal A. Maxwell, church schools in the Pacific started to hire administrators from local members, in contrast to the previously American administrators.

- Moroni High School (Kiribati)
- Church Primary School Fiji (Fiji)
- Church College Fiji (Fiji)
- Church College Pesega (Samoa)
- Church College Vaiola (Samoa)
- Sauniatu Primary School (Samoa)
- Vaiola Primary School (Samoa)
- Pesega Middle School (Samoa)
- Saineha High School (Tonga)
- Liahona High School (Tonga)
- E'Ua Middle School (Tonga)
- Havelu Middle School (Tonga)
- Koulo Middle School (Tonga)
- Pakilau Middle School (Tonga)

=== South America ===
Schools established in Chile in the 1960s; at its largest, church schools had 3,000 students across eight elementary schools and one secondary school. The schools closed in the 1980s. Church-sponsored elementary schools opened in Lima in 1966. Over the next five years, elementary schools opened in La Paz, Bolivia and Asuncion, Paraguay.

==== Chile ====
Shortly after the first mission was organized in Chile in 1961, Dale Harding became the superintendent of two elementary schools in La Cisterna and Vina del Mar, which were opened in March 1964. Rather than use the traditional lecture-exam format, teachers varied their teaching methods to include group work and in-service training. After the first year, all the children passed their government-administered end-of-year exams, with many performing very well. In 1967, Lyle J. Loosle became the new superintendent. Under his leadership, volunteers supported new elementary schools in Nunoa and Talcahuano.

In 1970, the Church Board of Education approved the purchase of a Catholic school near Santiago. Later that year, Salvador Allende, a Marxist, was elected as president, and Church members were uncertain about the future of the LDS Church and Church schools. The minister of education requested using a church building for another session of schooling. In response, Loosle increased enrollment to ensure that the schools were always operating at full capacity. Kindergartens operated in LDS chapels in Arica, Inquique, and La Calera to keep them from being used by the government for other purposes. After Allende was overthrown, the kindergartens closed.

In 1972, Jorge Rojas, the new superintendent from Mexico, dismissed two non-member teachers and made other reforms. Other teachers formed a union to protest new policies. Loosle was asked to return as superintendent after Church headquarters reassigned Rojas to a school in Mexico. Loosle dismissed teachers' union leaders when they refused to resign. The union leaders demanded reinstatement. Loosle asked teachers to repent of their unionization; some union members left the school, while others left the union. Loosle rehired some of the union leaders. In 1973, Beningno Pantoja Arratia became the new superintendent, and he made several reforms, including requiring ecclesiastical interviews. In 1970, Neal A. Maxwell became the Church Commissioner of Education, a new position overseeing Church schools, seminaries, and institutes. A 1971 policy from Maxwell stated that non-religious education should only be provided by the Church when "other educational systems are nonexistent, seriously deficient or inaccessible to our members." Chilean church schools started to close in 1977, with the Church's growth and adequate public schools given as reasons for closure. By 1981, Church schools had completely closed in Chile, Peru, Bolivia, and Paraguay.

=== Academies today ===
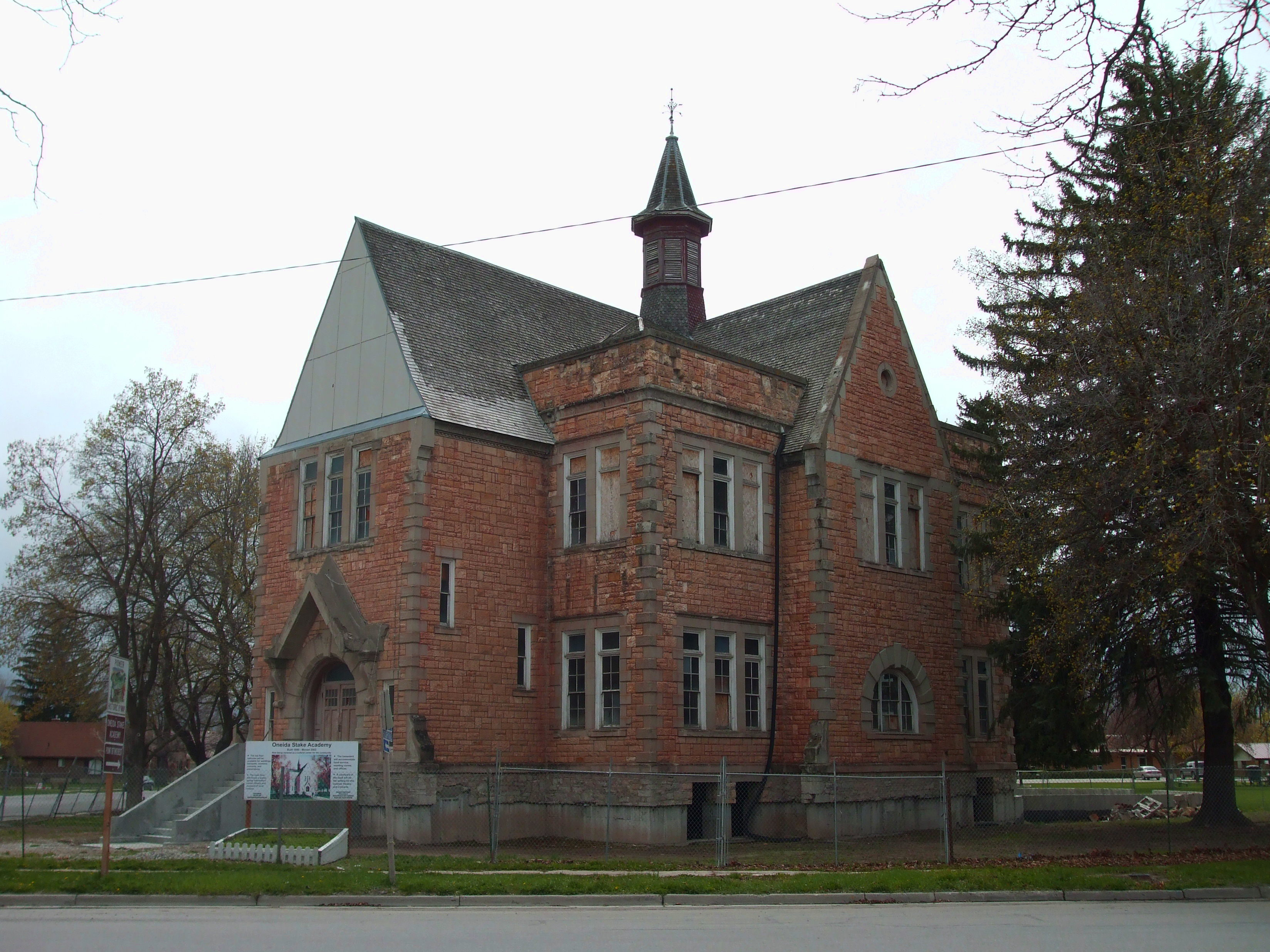
Oneida Stake Academy, Preston, Idaho

Some of academies remain historical landmarks, such as the Oneida Stake Academy and the Big Horn Academy. The Juarez Academy in Colonia Juarez, Mexico, is still operated as a secondary school by the LDS Church today.

A few church academies eventually evolved into colleges or universities. These include:

- Brigham Young Academy (founded 1875), now Brigham Young University (BYU)
- Salt Lake Stake Academy (founded 1886), spawning Ensign College (extant) and McCune School of Music (closed 1957)
- Bannock Stake Academy (founded 1888), now Brigham Young University–Idaho
- Sanpete Stake Academy (founded 1888), now Snow College
- Weber Stake Academy (founded 1889), now Weber State University
- St. Joseph Stake Academy (founded 1888), now Eastern Arizona College
- St. George Stake Academy (founded 1911), now Utah Tech University.

The LDS Church also established formal colleges and universities:

- University of Nauvoo was a community resource for academic learning established by the Nauvoo charter.
- University of Deseret (1850), now the University of Utah
- Brigham Young College in Logan, Utah (1877–1926)
- The Church University (1892–1894), also called Young University
- Church College of Hawaii (1955), now BYU–Hawaii

In the mid-20th century, the church established secondary schools outside of the United States to provide education where it was not fully available. These include:

- Church College of New Zealand (1958–2009)
- Benemerito De Las Americas (1964–2013) (Mexico City) — On January 29, 2013, the LDS Church announced the school would be closed and converted into a Missionary Training Center (MTC) at the end of the 2012–13 school year. The new MTC opened in June 2013.

== Higher education ==
Institutions of higher education run by the church include BYU, BYU–Idaho, BYU–Hawaii, and Ensign College, along with a higher education organization, BYU–PW.

=== Satellite campuses ===
- BYU Salt Lake Center, Salt Lake City, Utah
- BYU Jerusalem Center, Jerusalem
- BYU Barlow Center, Washington, D.C.
- BYU London Centre, London, England

== General administration ==
=== Church Board of Education and Boards of Trustees ===
Boards of Trustees/Education	Dallin H. Oaks; Henry B. Eyring; D. Todd Christofferson; Dale G. Renlund*; Gerrit W. Gong*; Michael T. Ringwood*; David P. Homer; W. Christopher Waddell; Camille N. Johnson*; Emily Belle Freeman; Timothy L. Farnes; Michael J. Christensen, Secretary

NOTE: Individuals with an asterisk (*) by their names serve as members of the board's executive committee. The senior member of the Quorum of the Twelve Apostles on the board, currently Renlund, serves as the chairman of the executive committee.

=== Office of the Commissioner of Church Education ===
Commissioner, Church Educational System	James R. Rasband
Assistant to the Commissioner and Secretary to the Boards	Michael J. Christensen
Sr. Director, Budgets and Administration, Church Educational System	TBA
Sr. Director, Planning, Research, and Strategic Initiatives, Church Educational System	Nathan K. Lindsay
Director, Communications, Media, and Events, Church Educational System	Susan M. Hunter

=== Presidents / Administrator of individual CES units ===
President / Administrator	CES Unit	Location
C. Shane Reese	Brigham Young University	Provo, Utah
John S. K. Kauwe III	Brigham Young University–Hawaii	Laie, Hawaii
Alvin F. Meredith III	Brigham Young University–Idaho	Rexburg, Idaho
Brian K. Ashton	BYU–Pathway Worldwide	Salt Lake City, Utah
Bruce C. Kusch	Ensign College	Salt Lake City, Utah
Rory C. Bigelow	Administrator, Seminaries and Institutes of Religion	Salt Lake City, Utah

=== Chronology of the Commissioner of Church Education ===
The office of Church Commissioner of Education was suspended in 1989, when trustees decided to deal directly with individual administrators. The position was reinstated in 1992.

No.	Dates	Individual	Title
1	1888–1901	Karl G. Maeser	Superintendent of Church Schools
2	1901–05	Joseph M. Tanner	Superintendent of Church Schools
3	1905–20	Horace H. Cummings	Commissioner of Church Schools
4	1920–21	David O. McKay	Commissioner of Church Education
5	1921–24	John A. Widtsoe	Commissioner of Church Education
6	1928–33	Joseph F. Merrill	Commissioner of Church Education
7	1934–36	John A. Widtsoe	Commissioner of Church Education
8	1936–53	Franklin L. West	Commissioner of Church Education
9	1953–64	Ernest L. Wilkinson	Administrator–Chancellor of the Unified Church School System
10	1964–1970	Harvey L. Taylor	Administrator of the Unified Church School System
11	1970–76	Neal A. Maxwell	Commissioner of Church Education
12	1976–80	Jeffrey R. Holland	Commissioner of Church Education
13	1980–86	Henry B. Eyring	Commissioner of Church Education
14	1986–89	J. Elliot Cameron	Commissioner of Church Education
15	1992–2004	Henry B. Eyring	Commissioner of Church Education
16	2005–08	W. Rolfe Kerr	Commissioner of Church Education
17	2008–15	Paul V. Johnson	Commissioner of Church Education
18	2015–19	Kim B. Clark	Commissioner of Church Education
19	2019–21	Paul V. Johnson	Commissioner of Church Education
20	2021–26	Clark G. Gilbert	Commissioner of Church Education
21	2026–	James R. Rasband	Commissioner of Church Education

== See also ==
- Church Educational System Honor Code
- Education in Zion Gallery
- LDS Student Association
