= Dusenbery =

Dusenbery is a surname. Notable people with the surname include:

- David B. Dusenbery (born 1948), American biophysicist
- Bill Dusenbery (born 1970), American football player
- Walter Dusenbery (born 1939), American sculptor
- Warren Newton Dusenberry (1836–1915), American educator

== See also ==
- Dusenberry
