= Dusenberry =

Dusenberry is a surname. Notable people with the surname include:

- Ann Dusenberry (born 1958), American actress
- Ida Smoot Dusenberry (1873–1955)
- James Verne Dusenberry (1906–1966), American anthropologist
- Phil Dusenberry (1936–2007), American advertising executive
- Stephen Dusenberry, American drummer
- Warren Newton Dusenberry (1836–1915), American Mormon missionary
