= History of Brigham Young University =

"I hope to see an Academy established in Provo... at which the children of the Latter-day Saints can receive a good education unmixed with the pernicious atheistic influences that are found in so many of the higher schools of the country."

— Brigham Young, 1875

The history of Brigham Young University (BYU) begins in 1875, when the school was called Brigham Young Academy (BYA). The school did not reach university status until 1903, in a decision made by the school's board of trustees at the request of BYU president Benjamin Cluff. It became accredited during the tenure of Franklin S. Harris, under whom it gained national recognition as a university. A period of expansion after World War II caused the student body to grow many times in size, making BYU the largest private university of the time. The school's history is closely connected with its sponsor, The Church of Jesus Christ of Latter-day Saints (LDS Church).

== Early years ==
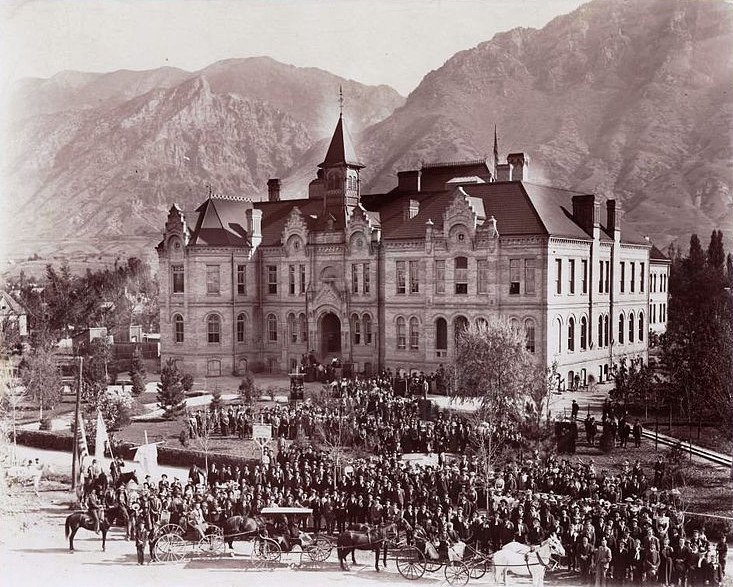
Brigham Young Academy ca. 1900

BYU's origin can be traced back to 1862, when Warren and Wilson Dusenberry started a Provo school in a prominent adobe building called Cluff Hall, located in the northeast corner of 200 East and 200 North. Dusenberry paid the $50 a month in rent and manufactured the desks for the school himself. In 1865, despite popularity of the school, he left the school to enter into private business because of financial difficulty. In 1869, he started another school in Provo with his brother, this time in a different building. This school flourished, so they expanded to a building called the Lewis Building on Center and 300 West, with an executive committee (with people such as K.R. Hopkins, Peter Stubbs, and Myron Tanner) elected to take care of the interests of the school. The school grew in popularity and acclaim, so when the University of Deseret was reestablished in March 1869, the popularity and quality of the second Dusenberry School made it a prime candidate to be the first branch of the university, and it was converted into the Timpanogos Branch. Enrollment eventually eclipsed 300, surpassing even the University of Deseret.

Then on October 16, 1875, after some financial difficulties forced another closure, Brigham Young, LDS Church president (who owned the building and had been lending it rent free to the school), drew up and signed a deed of trust creating a new school, which idea he had been working on for some time. This is the commonly held founding date of BYU. Young broke the school off from the University of Deseret and christened it "Brigham Young Academy." The original board of trustees included "Martha Jane Knowlton Coray to represent women's interests."

Classes at the new BYA commenced January 3, 1876. Reed Smoot was the first of 29 students to register for classes on that day [he graduated from the BYA high school in the Class of 1880]. Warren Dusenberry served as interim principal of the school for several months until April 1876, when Young's choice for principal arrived, a German immigrant named Karl G. Maeser. In January 1884, a fire started in a chemistry lab and destroyed the Lewis Building. Students temporarily held class in three separate locations before relocating to a warehouse on University Avenue. The students attended class in the ZCMI warehouse (Note: Completed in 1884, the warehouse was located at University Avenue and 600 South. The academy used a small portion of the back of the main floor along with the second story. The building was sold by ZCMI in 1959 and demolished in 1967.) until January 1892, when an elaborate brick and sandstone building called the "BY Academy Building" was completed.

== Benjamin Cluff, Jr. ==
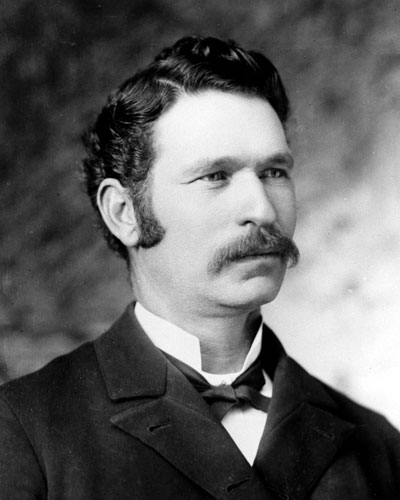
Benjamin Cluff, Jr ca. 1903

By this time, Maeser had to be replaced as president by the board of trustees. He had been called to oversee the entire LDS educational program and was unable to do both jobs. The Board's initial choice was twenty-seven-year-old James E. Talmage, but before they could extend the invitation, he was hired by LDS College in Salt Lake City. They instead chose a recent graduate of the University of Michigan, Benjamin Cluff. Cluff's methods as president have been described as nearly opposite those of Maeser. Maeser was insular and conservative in his teaching methods. He kept his teachings well within the LDS world, and adhered to classical education standards. Cluff was more open to new ideas and methods. He also believed that the world outside Mormonism had a lot to offer the school.

BYA was still more like a present-day high school than a university. Some BYA students were at the elementary level and received tutoring from older students. Cluff, however began implementing several changes to the school according to his experiences at Michigan. He began separation of the college from the high school, giving older students access to higher level materials. He also introduced an athletics program, which was quickly closed by the Board of Trustees (Many colleges at this time frowned on athletics programs). The school was privately supported by members of the community, and was not absorbed and sponsored officially by the LDS Church until July 18, 1896.

Cluff continued his somewhat unusual tactics in 1900, when he took a group of students on an expedition to Mexico to explore the lands of the Book of Mormon and discover Zarahemla. At the Mexican border, Cluff and his group were met by Heber J. Grant, a member of the church's Quorum of the Twelve Apostles. Grant disapproved of the expedition and asked Cluff to go back, but he refused. What followed was an eighteen-month adventure through jungle, full of illness, and including a stay in Mexican prison. Cluff and his group eventually returned to BYA in 1902. For another two years he served the school successfully, seeing it double in size. However, Walter Wolfe, one of the men who had come on the Mexican expedition, accused Cluff of mismanagement, misrepresentation, misappropriation of funds, and immorality, all having allegedly occurred in Mexico. Although Cluff was cleared of all charges, the damage done to his reputation required the board to hire a new president.

In his last official act, Cluff proposed to the board that BYA be renamed "Brigham Young University". At first there was a large amount of opposition to this. Many members of the board thought that the school wasn't large enough to be a university. However, the decision ultimately passed. One opponent to the decision, Anthon H. Lund, later said, "I hope their head will grow big enough for their hat."

== George H. Brimhall ==
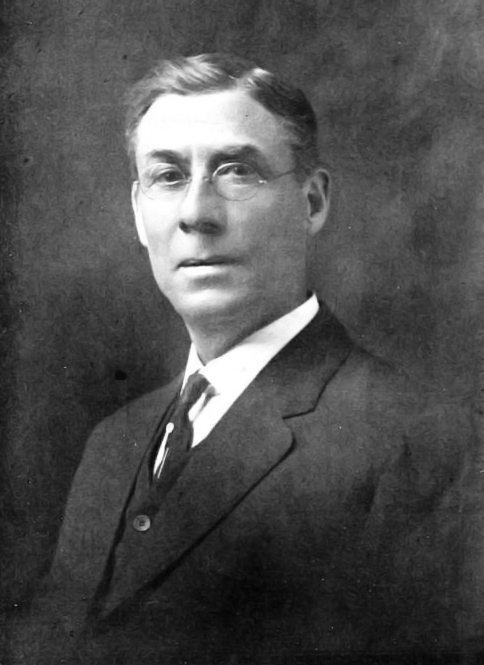
George H. Brimhall ca. 1914

In 1903, BYA was dissolved, and was replaced by two institutions: Brigham Young High School, and BYU. (The BY High School class of 1907 was ultimately responsible for the famous giant "Y" that is to this day embedded on a mountain near campus.) The Board elected George H. Brimhall as the new BYU president by a narrow margin, as his health during Cluff's tenure had been failing. Brimhall did not have the education of previous leaders of the school. He had not received a high school education until he was forty. Nevertheless, he was an excellent orator and organizer.

In 1904, the new BYU bought 17 acres (69,000 m^{2}) of land from Provo. This land was called "Temple Hill", and many people had presumed that the LDS Church would build a temple on this property. Because of this expectation, some people were opposed to BYU buying the land. But thanks to the leadership of a BYU student named Byron Owen Colton, the opposition to the land purchase was assuaged and the deal was consummated. It was on this Temple Hill land, north of the BY Academy Building, that present-day BYU was begun. In 1909, construction began on the first building on the current campus, the Karl G. Maeser Memorial.

By 1910, Brimhall had hired several new faculty with high credentials, many of them PhDs in their fields. These included Ralph Chamberlin, biologist, his brother William Chamberlin, philosopher, and brothers Joseph and Henry Peterson, who taught psychology and education, respectively. This was an unprecedented step for the school, as Cluff had previously been the most educated member of the staff, with a master's degree earned while he was in office. Brimhall, like many of the presidents before him, believed in delegation, and distributed many of his duties among the new faculty. Eventually, problems began to arise. Several of the faculty believed that the school should teach organic evolution, while others disagreed. The ensuing contention ended with a decision not to teach evolution issued by LDS Church president Joseph F. Smith, two faculty members being fired, and several others resigning out of sympathy for those discharged. History seems to show that the two faculty members were fired for an inability to compromise with the rest of the group, rather than their pro-evolution agenda, although this has been disputed. Many wondered whether the school would survive this crisis. A few have described the school at this time as nothing more than a "religious seminary". However, many of its graduates at this time would go on to great success and renown in their fields.

== Franklin S. Harris to Ernest L. Wilkinson ==
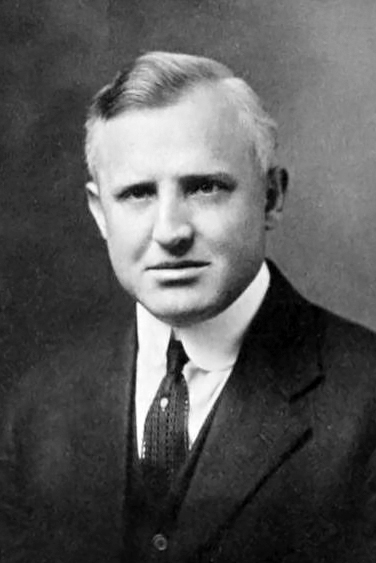
Franklin S. Harris
ca. 1922

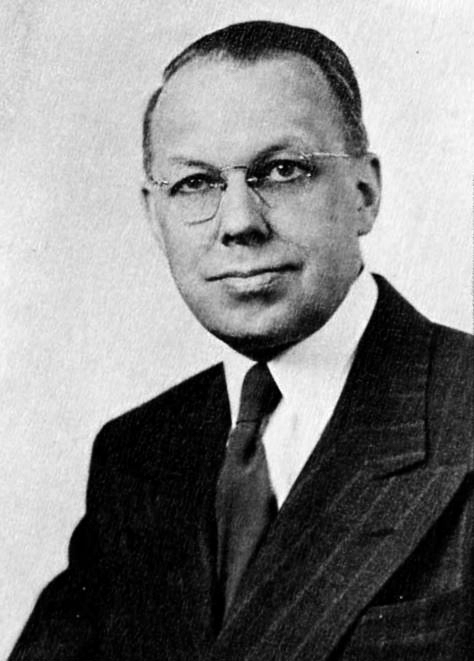
Ernest Leroy Wilkinson
in 1951

Franklin S. Harris was appointed as BYU's president in 1921 and was the first to have a doctoral degree. Harris made several important changes to the school, lifting it from its somewhat dismal status at the end of Brimhall's tenure into a new era. Harris reorganized the college into a true university, whereas before its organization had remnants of the academy days. He also began work on achieving accreditation for the school. At the beginning of his tenure, the school was not officially recognized as a university by any accreditation organization. By the end of his term, the school was accredited under all major accrediting organizations at the time. He served twenty-four years, longer than any other BYU president, before resigning in 1945 to work at Utah State University.

Harris was replaced by Howard S. McDonald, who had received a doctorate from the University of California. McDonald was used to an organization which placed the president at the head of decision-making, rather than a board of trustees. Because of this, he had a lot of trouble working with the board, who at BYU had more power than he was accustomed to. However, he achieved several valuable things in his four-year tenure. When he first received the position, World War II had just ended, and thousands of students were flooding into BYU. By the end of his stay, the school had grown nearly five times, to an enrollment of 5,440 students. BYU did not have the facilities to handle such a large influx, so he bought part of an Air Force Base in Ogden, Utah, and rebuilt it to house some of the students. McDonald also did several other things. When asked by church leaders whether support for the college be dropped, he answered an adamant no, putting an end to the last real question of the school's survival. He also began a significant building program which was continued by his successors. McDonald resigned in 1949 in order to work at a Los Angeles College fitting his administrative style better.

After a one-and-a-half year period in which Christen Jensen temporarily filled the position of president, Ernest L. Wilkinson was appointed by the board of trustees. Wilkinson's administration was a period of intense growth, as the school adopted an accelerated building program. Wilkinson was responsible for the building of over eighty structures on the campus, many of which still stand. During his tenure, the student body increased six times, making BYU the largest private school of the time. The quality of the students also increased, leading to higher educational standards at the school. Wilkinson reorganized the LDS Church units on campus, with ten stakes and over 100 wards added during his administration.

=== Alpine Summer School ===
Aspen Grove is an alumni and family camp associated with BYU. In 1911, Eugene L. Roberts used the location as a starting point for the school's annual hike to Mount Timpanogos. Ten years later, the landowner donated 35 acres of the property to BYU on which the Alpine Summer School was established in 1922. Students lived there in tents to study zoology, botany, and geology, entomology, and art. The first directors of the camp were Martin P. Henderson, Fred Buss, and Clawson Y. Cannon. The school later built a kitchen, a dining hall, and dormitories, but the camp was abandoned during World War II. The director of the BYU Alumni association, Raymond Beckham, fundraised to establish Aspen Grove as an alumni camp. Construction began in 1962 and added running water, a sewage system, and a swimming pool. The camp officially opened on July 13, 1963. Open year-round, the camp has grown to accommodate thousands of guests for family vacations, reunions, youth conferences, and retreats.

== Dallin H. Oaks to Merrill J. Bateman ==
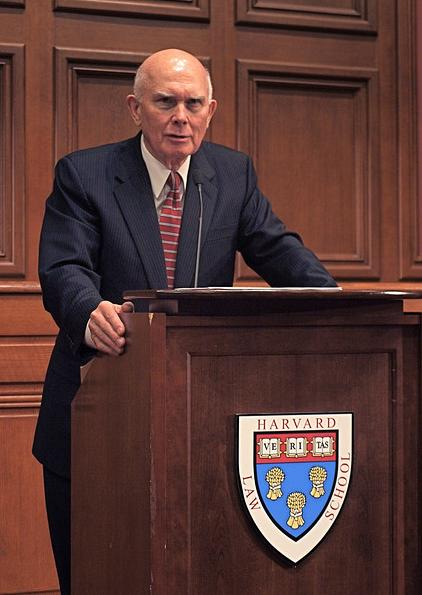
Dallin H. Oaks in 2010

Dallin H. Oaks replaced Wilkinson as president in 1971. Oaks continued the expansion of his predecessor, adding a law school and proposing plans for a new School of Management. During his administration, a new library was also added, doubling the library space on campus. Oaks was appointed to the Utah Supreme Court in 1980, and was succeeded as president by Jeffrey R. Holland. Holland encouraged a combination of educational excellence and religious faith at the university. He believed that one of the school's greatest strengths was its religious nature, and believed that should be taken advantage of, rather than hidden. During his administration, the university added a campus in Jerusalem, now called the BYU Jerusalem Center. When the new campus faced local opposition, Holland personally visited protesters and promised, in writing, that nobody associated with the new campus would proselyte, leading to the Center's successful completion. In 1989, Holland was called as a general authority and was replaced by Rex E. Lee. Lee was responsible for the Benson Science Building and the Museum of Art on campus. As one who fought, but eventually died from cancer, Lee is honored annually at BYU during a cancer fundraiser called the Rex Lee Run.

Lee was replaced in 1996 by Merrill J. Bateman. From 1996 to 1999, Bateman oversaw the expansion of the Harold B. Lee Library. He also strengthened the foundations of several buildings on campus in case of an earthquake. Later in his term, he began plans for the Joseph F. Smith Building, completed in 2004. Bateman was responsible for the building of 36 new buildings for BYU, both on and off campus, including the Barlow Center in Washington D. C. This center is a place for students to stay and also provide a BYU presence in the city. Athletics programs also saw development under Bateman, including the creation of the women's softball team. He was also one of several key college leaders who brought about the creation of the Mountain West Conference, which BYU's athletics program joined. Previously, BYU had been in the Western Athletic Conference. Bateman was instrumental in a push to rename "Cougar Stadium", "LaVell Edwards Stadium" in 2000, in honor of former football coach, LaVell Edwards. He also led a push among several universities to reverse an NCAA ruling that games could be scheduled on Sunday (an effort which was unsuccessful). Overall, sports programs flourished under Bateman's tenure. In the computing and technology area, Bateman directed a merging of BYU's computer systems with the LDS Church's, as well as enlarging the resources available to computing majors. A BYU satellite TV network also opened in 2000, under his leadership. Bateman was also president during the September 11th attacks in 2001. The planes crashed on a Tuesday, mere hours before the weekly devotional normally held at BYU. Previous plans for the devotional were altered, as Bateman led the student body in a prayer for peace.

== 2003 to present ==
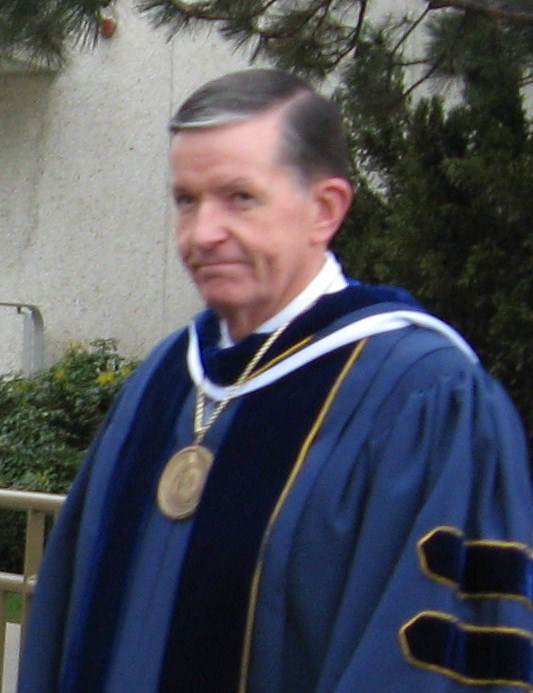
Cecil O. Samuelson in 2008

Bateman was followed by Cecil O. Samuelson in 2003.

In 2007, the church's First Presidency invited George W. Bush to speak as the commencement speaker. When it became evident that he would be unable to attend, Dick Cheney accepted the invitation instead. The invitation generated controversy that was covered by all major news outlets. BYU's board of trustees issued a statement explaining that the invitation to Cheney should be viewed "as one extended to someone holding the high office of vice president of the United States rather than to a partisan political figure." However, BYU permitted a protest to occur so long as it did not "attack [the] BYU administration, the Church or the First Presidency." On April 26, 2007, Cheney delivered a largely apolitical speech and was greeted warmly by over 20,000. All three members of the First Presidency were in attendance. The leader of the protest was invited to appear on The Daily Show with Jon Stewart but did not do so because, "It wouldn't be a big deal if they were to make fun of our club, because it is funny, but it's something else if it's BYU or the church." A group of students held an alternative commencement off campus at a different time featuring Ralph Nader and Jack Healey as speakers.

In two separate forum assemblies in October 2007, BYU also hosted US Senate Majority Leader Harry Reid (a Democrat) and U.S. Supreme Court Chief Justice John Roberts as forum speakers. During his speech, Reid presented his reasons for his political beliefs, his thoughts on the Iraq war, and his condemnation of those who opposed or supported Mitt Romney for his religious (as compared to his political) beliefs alone. Roberts spoke about the powers and limitations placed on the federal judiciary by the United States Constitution.

In 2012, BYU reached a legal settlement with pharmaceutical giant Pfizer over a long-disputed patent claim involving the research behind the successful drug Celebrex. While the settlement amount was not disclosed, Pfizer's quarterly filings initially earmarked at least $450 million (BYU originally sought over $9 billion); is expected that this and likely future payments will have significant impact on BYU's endowment and research funding.

Samuelson was followed by Kevin J Worthen in May 2014. Worthen has worked as an attorney, BYU faculty member and as dean of the J. Reuben Clark Law School. At the time of his appointment as president, he had been serving as BYU's Advancement Vice President.

== See also ==
- List of Brigham Young University buildings
- Academic freedom at Brigham Young University
- BYU Cougars
- Student life at Brigham Young University
- Church Educational System Honor Code
- Brigham Young University LGBT history
- List of Brigham Young University alumni
- Brigham Young High School
