= Karl G. Maeser =

Prominent Utah educator (1828–1901)

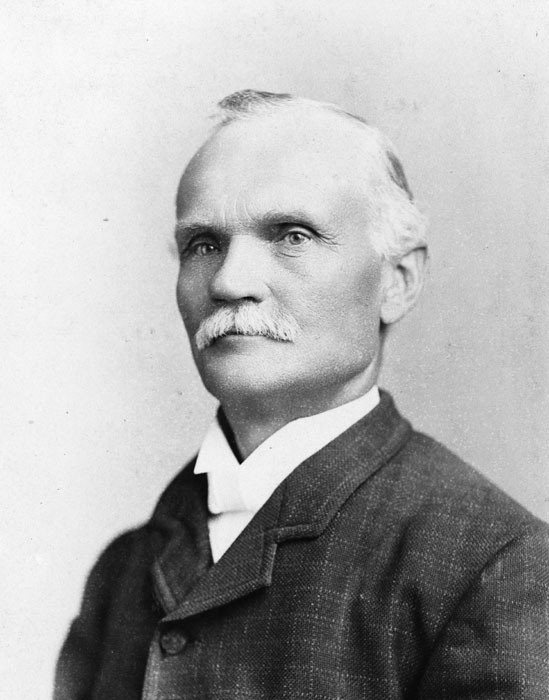

Principal of Brigham Young Academy (later becoming Brigham Young University)
- In office August 1876 – January 1892
- Preceded by: Warren Newton Dusenberry
- Succeeded by: Benjamin Cluff

Personal details
- Born: January 16, 1828 Vorbrücke, Saxony (now Meissen, Germany)
- Died: February 15, 1901 (aged 73) Salt Lake City, Utah, United States
- Spouses: Anna Mieth; Emilie Damke
- Children: 8

Karl Gottfried Maeser (January 16, 1828 – February 15, 1901) was a German secondary school teacher from Saxony, prominent Utah educator, and a member of the Church of Jesus Christ of Latter-day Saints (LDS Church). He served 16 years as principal of Brigham Young Academy (BYA). Although he was not the first principal of the Academy, he is considered its founder. The Academy later became Brigham Young University (BYU) in 1903.

Before teaching at BYA, Maeser worked as a teacher in Saxony, Bohemia and Utah. He tutored Brigham Young's children. Maeser incorporated the Monitorial system into his teaching philosophies and was influenced by Pestalozzian educational theory, but he advocated religious aspects in schooling.

Maeser served as an LDS Church missionary in four nations; he served as the head of the Church Educational System and in the central leadership of the Sunday School. His educational philosophies shaped BYA and other church academies throughout Utah.

== Early life ==
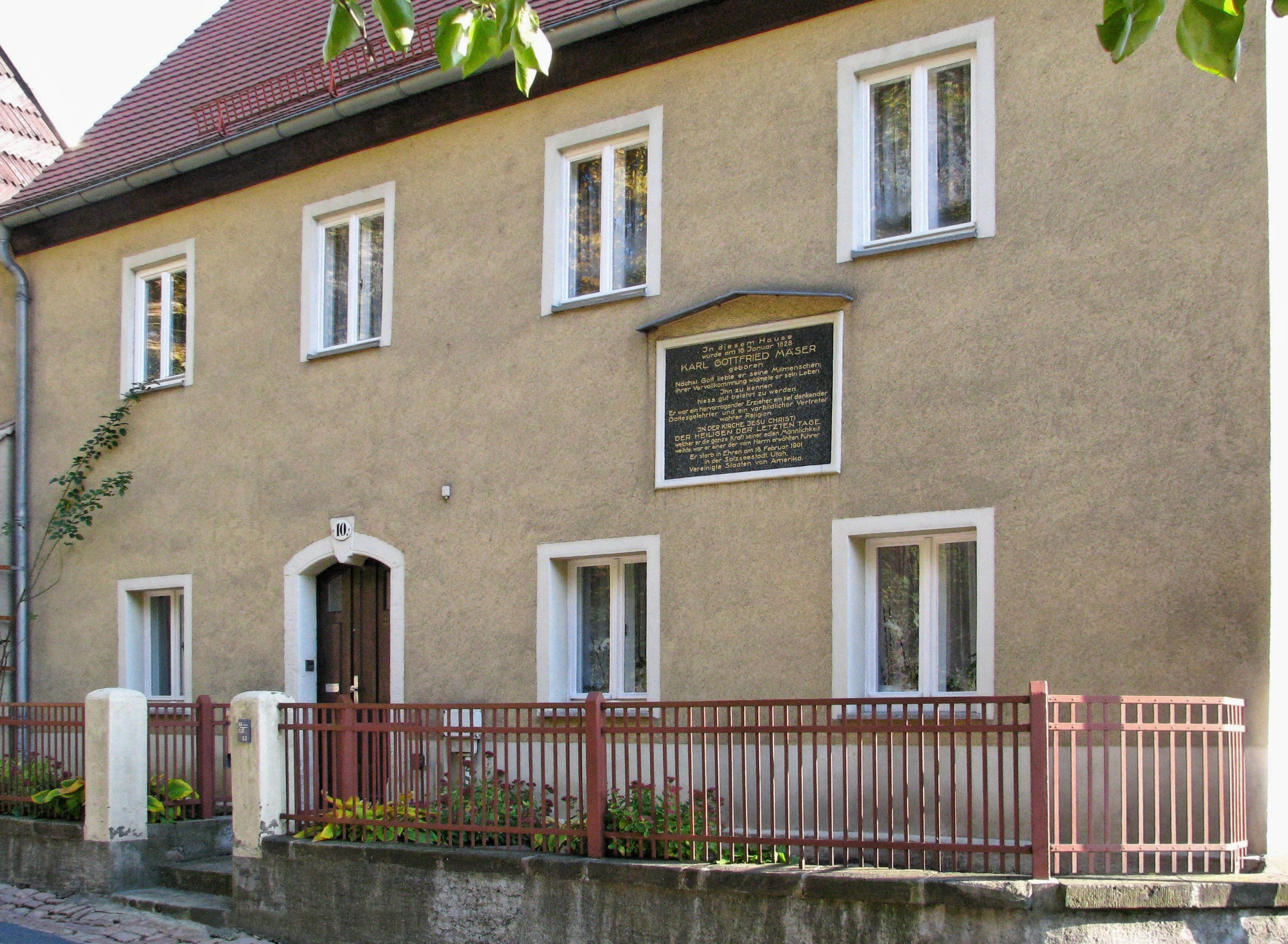
The house where Maeser was born

Maeser was born on January 16, 1828, in the town of Vorbrücke (which later became part of neighboring Meissen) in the Kingdom of Saxony to Johann Gottfried and Federicka Zocher Maeser. Maeser was the oldest of four sons. His father was a porcelain painter. Maeser went to public school in Meissen. He temporarily lost his sight for eight months when he was 11 years old, the cause was unknown.

In 1842, Maeser enrolled in the Kreuzschule in Dresden, attending for two years. He then studied at Friedrichstadt Schullehrerseminar in Dresden, a school for prospective teachers, graduating in 1848. Maeser became a schoolteacher and tutored Protestant children in Bohemia for three years. He returned to Dresden taught at the First District School in Dresden. He later taught at the Budich Institute, where he was made Oberlehrer (senior teacher).

In December 1848, Maeser was required to enlist in the military for a two-year assignment, but was declared "unfit." Maeser had no major physical or mental disabilities that would have impacted his conscription. On June 11, 1854, Maeser married Anna Mieth, the daughter of the director of the First District school in Dresden. The couple had their first child, Reinhard, in 1855. They had a total of eight children.

== Membership in the LDS Church ==
=== Conversion ===
While teaching at the Budich Institute, Maeser came across Die Mormonen, an anti-Mormon book by Moritz Busch. He and Edward Schoenfield, Maeser's brother-in-law and fellow teacher, investigated the beliefs and practices the LDS Church. Maeser wrote letters to LDS missionaries; the missionary William Budge volunteered to go to Maeser's home to teach him and answer his questions. Both Maeser and Schoenfield joined the LDS Church. Maeser was baptized by Franklin D. Richards on October 14, 1855, in the Elbe. The baptism occurred at night because the church was banned in Saxony at that time. Maeser was the first Latter-day Saint baptized in Saxony. His wife, Anna, was baptized shortly after on October 19. The following Sunday, a new branch of the church was established in Dresden, and Maeser became its first president. He and his family were forced to leave Saxony by the Dresden police in July of 1856.

=== Missionary service ===
After being exiled from Saxony, the Maesers went to London in June 1856. Maeser was called by the church to serve a German-speaking mission in London in July 1856. He and his family left London in May 1857; their ship arrived in Philadelphia in July. The Maeser's infant son, Karl Gustav Franklin Maeser, died as they arrived and was buried in Philadelphia.

In Philadelphia, Maeser was commissioned by the church to develop pamphlets on its basic principles. After living there a few weeks, Maeser was called to serve as an LDS Church missionary to the German-speaking community of Philadelphia. Maeser spent some time in Virginia as part of his mission, where he also gave music lessons. Among Maeser's music students were the daughters of former United States President John Tyler. Maeser returned with Anna to Philadelphia, where he was called by the church to serve as conference president. Maeser and his family left Philadelphia in June 1860 and traveled to Salt Lake City in Patriarch John Smith's company.

In 1860, Maeser was appointed by church leaders to head church meetings in Salt Lake City held in German; this ended when most of the Swiss church members moved to locations in southern or central Utah. He was called to serve a mission to Germany and Switzerland in 1867. On his way to Switzerland with Octave Ursenbach they organized a branch of the church in Paris, and he was appointed mission president in 1868. He founded the church magazine, Der Stern, in January 1869. Upon his return to Utah in 1870, there were enough German-speaking church members in Salt Lake City to hold church meetings again, and Maeser presided over them.

In 1875, Maeser took a second wife, Emilie Damke. Damke was 23 years younger than Anna. The event marked Maeser's acceptance of Mormon practice, which stood in stark contradiction to German social norms. He was arrested in 1884 for "unlawful cohabitation" and was charged with a fine of $300 (equivalent to $10,750 in 2025).

== Career ==
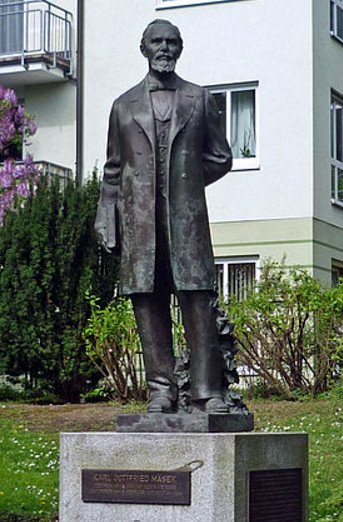
Statue of Maeser in Dresden, Germany

Maeser accepted his first teaching position in the First District School in Dresden from 1852 to 1853, and he taught at the Budich Institute beginning in 1854. Maeser continued his teaching career when he arrived in Utah. He taught at the Deseret Lyceum, an academy established in Salt Lake City in November 1860. In the spring of 1861, Maeser took a position at the Union Academy. This academy was intended for students above elementary grades. Young appointed Maeser head of the school in February 1861. Maeser was concerned about the school systems meeting the needs and interests of its students, and he left the Union Academy to teach in other schools and seminaries, including the Twentieth Ward Seminary, which he founded in 1862.

Maeser was the regent of the University of Deseret in 1860, 1863 and 1865. In 1865, he began to privately tutor Young's fifty-six children and instructed other children who came to the Young household, including Ellis Reynolds Shipp. He also kept books for Leonard H. Hardy to supplement his income. Maeser was teaching at Young's family school when he was called on a mission to Germany in 1867. He left for Europe in May 1867, leaving his family in a poor financial state.

Maeser returned to Salt Lake City in 1870 and became a professor of German; he resigned from this position to return to the Twentieth Ward Seminary. In 1870, he also taught at the University of Deseret, helping to develop their teacher training program. Maeser wrote articles in the Beehive Series of the Juvenile Instructor during 1870. In 1871, he was elected the president of the Salt Lake Teacher's Association. For a short period of time he was also an assistant organist for the Mormon Tabernacle Choir.

=== Brigham Young Academy ===
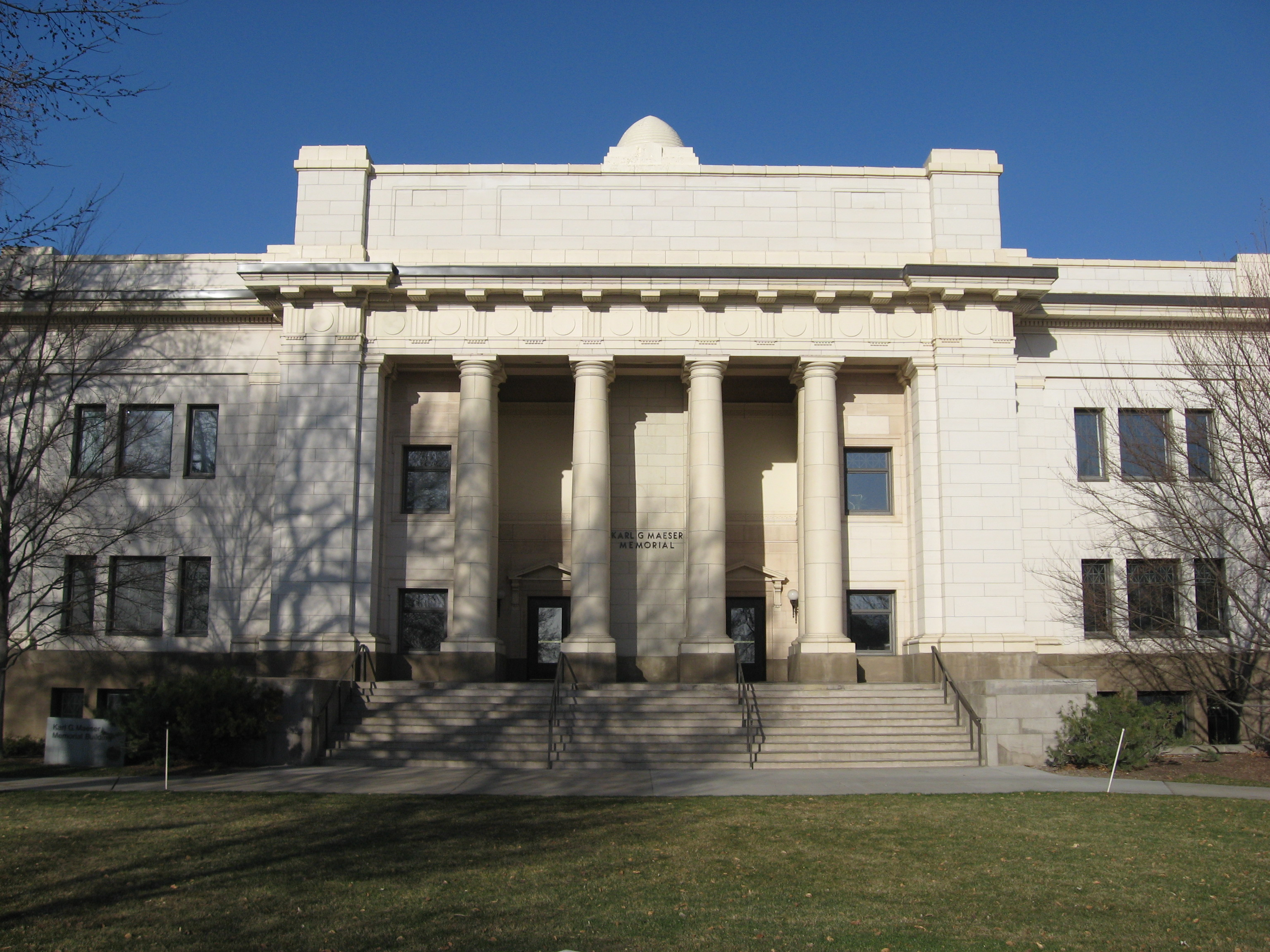
BYU's Karl G. Maeser Building

Maeser was selected to be the founding principal of Brigham Young Academy (BYA) by Brigham Young, as it had been run by interim appointments since its founding. When Maeser arrived at BYA in 1876, during the school's "second experimental" term, enrollment had declined since its founding. 29 students enrolled at the beginning of Maeser's first term, but this number doubled by the end of the term. Maeser was the only teacher during this term and agreed to teach for $1200 per year.

Under Maeser's administration, the school was divided into different departments based on the ability of students. The lower divisions included the Primary, Preparatory, Intermediate, and Kindergarten departments while the higher divisions of the Academy included the Academic Department and the Normal School. Maeser oversaw the Normal School. Maeser also established a daily routine for the school. Over 3,000 different students enrolled at the Academy while Maeser was its principal. Maeser was very strict, and students that attended the Academy had to adhere to a standard of moral conduct. He also established training courses for teachers, and kept parents informed and sent monthly reports to them on the progress of their children.

In 1884, the Lewis building, where the academy first met, burned down.

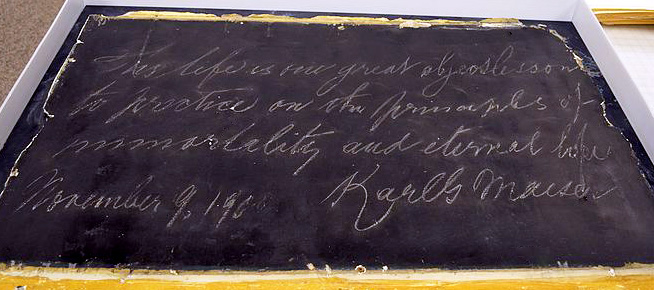
Message written by Maeser

The school struggled financially for some time and Maeser pondered going elsewhere, but a dream changed his mind. Maeser retired from Brigham Young Academy in 1892 to devote his time to his position as the Superintendent of Church Schools. He was succeeded by Benjamin Cluff.

Shortly before his death, Maeser was invited to speak at the anniversary of the founders day at the Maeser School, a public school named after him. The four chalkboards on which he wrote religious tenets are preserved at Brigham Young University.

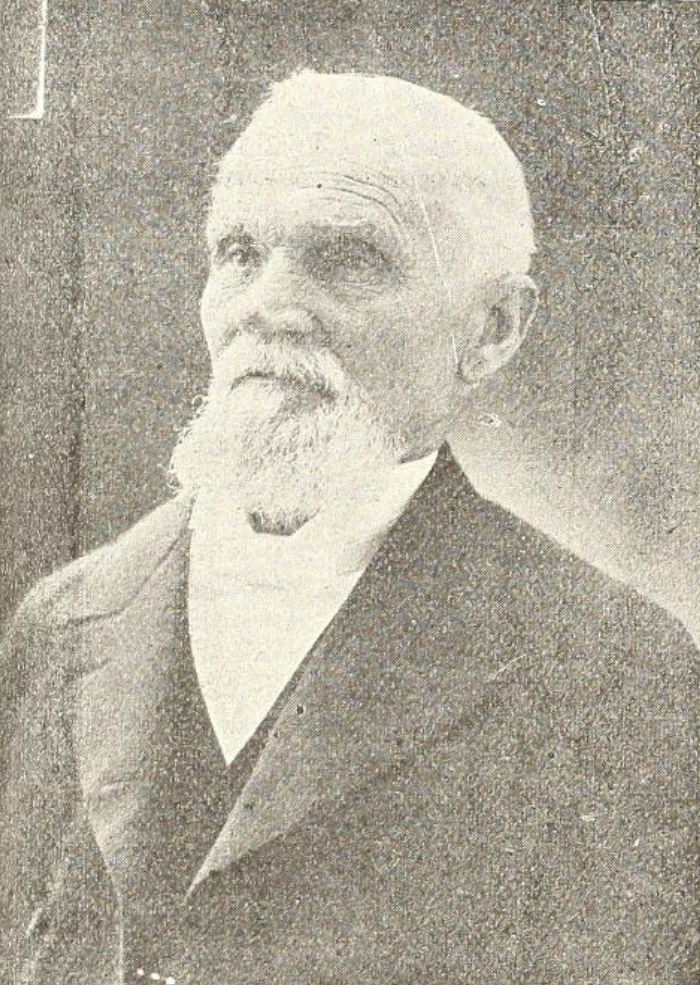
Maeser.

=== Superintendent of the Church Educational System ===
In 1887, Maeser proposed creating a Church Board of Education to maintain and supervise LDS church schools. The board was created in April 1888. Maeser was a member, and was later appointed the superintendent of the Church Educational System. As superintendent, Maeser helped establish initial policies for new academies established by the church. He also helped train teachers, and gave suggestions on the architecture of new school designs. By 1889, Maeser oversaw 19 schools that operated under the academy system. The board awarded Maeser a Doctor of Letters and Didactics degree that same year. He also continued writing in the Juvenile Instructor in the 1890s to clarify church educational policies.

Maeser also served in the General Superintendency of the Deseret Sunday School Union. He was the Second Assistant to General Superintendent George Q. Cannon from July 1894 to January 1899. He then served as the First Assistant to Cannon from January 1899 until February 1901. Maeser participated in the Utah constitutional convention after Abraham Smoot's death in 1895. He proposed an article to support prohibition, but later backed down.

=== Mid-winter Fair in San Francisco ===
Maeser presided over the California mission from January to August 1894 when he was replaced by Henry S. Tanner as president. Maeser's primary responsibility was to head the Utah exhibit at the Mid-winter Fair in San Francisco in 1894. The exposition was patterned after Chicago World's Fair of 1893, but Maeser's exhibit focused more on beliefs of the church and educational accomplishments of students in the church school systems. The church had an exhibit in the Manufacturers and Liberal Arts Building, and Maeser gave a series of lectures to bring more publicity to the church school exhibit. Utah's participation in the exhibit attempted to gain favor for its becoming a state. He and his companions helped distribute information about the history of Utah.

== Educational philosophies ==
Maeser opposed educational philosophies of John Locke, who argued that education was for the elite only. Maeser recognized that Johann Bernhard Basedow had good ideas about treating students with kindness and removing physical punishment from the classroom; however, Maeser believed that "come, follow me" and not "thou shalt" were the best principles for teaching.

=== Monitorial system ===
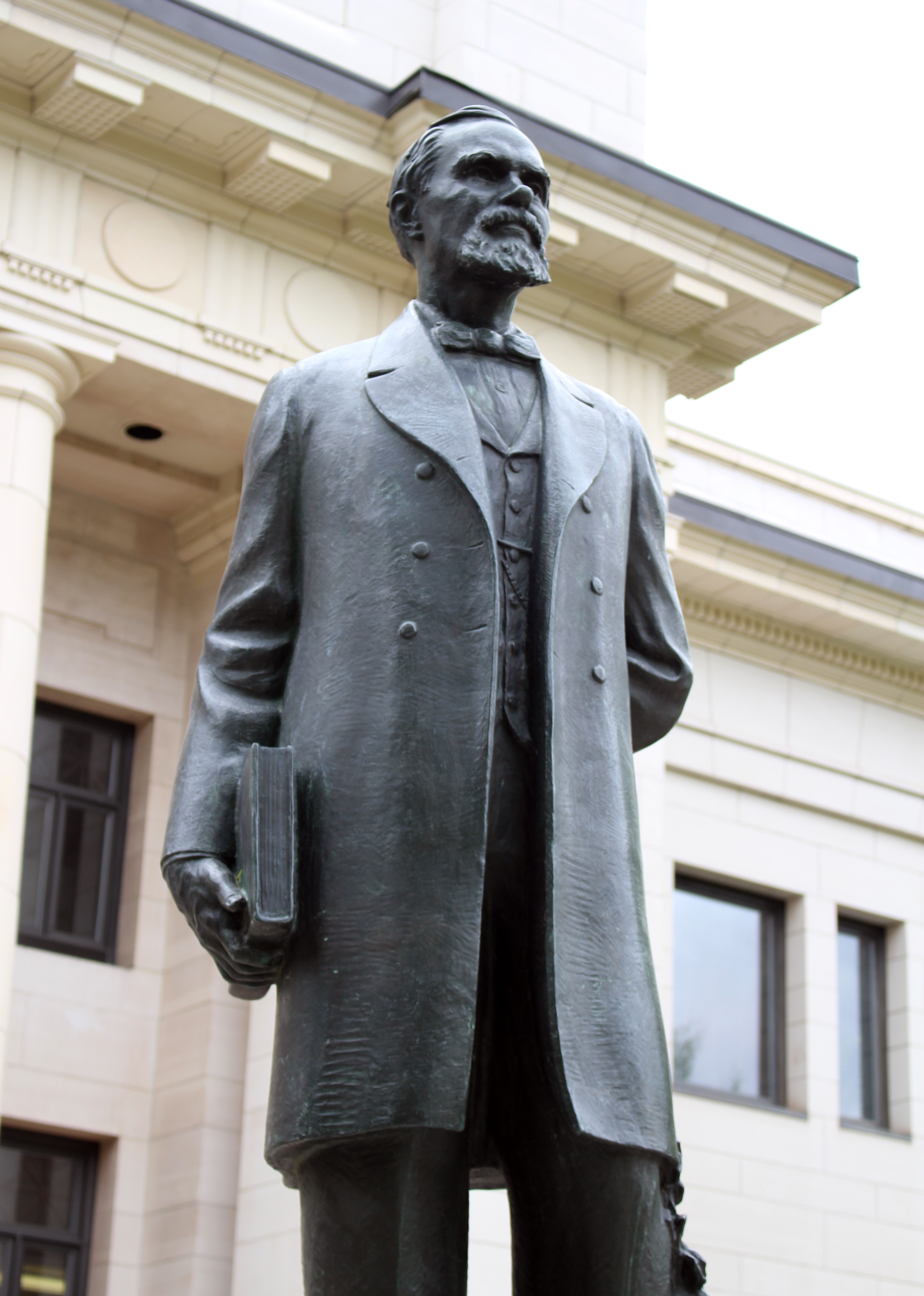
Statue of Maeser at Brigham Young University

Maeser included the Monitorial system from Andrew Bell and Joseph Lancaster in his teacher training courses. This system suggested that more advanced students monitored the less advanced students and that the layout of a classroom should allow one teacher to oversee a large number of students. Maeser believed that this system was flawed because it focused on developing efficiency and disregarded individuality. Maeser argued that the teacher should have more personal interactions with students. He implemented his monitorial organization so that each student would be responsible for something or someone else.

=== Pestalozzian educational theory ===
While attending the Friedrichstadt Teacher College, Maeser was exposed to Pestalozzian educational theory, which influenced his educational philosophy. Pestalozzi encouraged teachers to treat their students with kindness and respect, and to show love to their students, instead of evoking fear. Pestalozzi was also in favor of universal education and opposed separately educating different social classes. Maeser adopted many of his ideas. He supported the education of women. Maeser believed that students should be allowed to express themselves freely and choose their own careers. His lectures tried to engage students and help them understand concepts through their own experiences. He also included many object lessons to coach students to observe their surroundings and make connections.

=== Role of religion ===
Maeser believed that religion played a key role in true education. He viewed each student as a child of God with individual capacity and potential. He thought that all schools should adhere to some religious aspect. He also argued that public high schools should be supplemented by religion classes. Maeser was respectful of other religious denominations, although Brigham Young Academy and Brigham Young University integrated beliefs from the LDS Church.

== Legacy ==
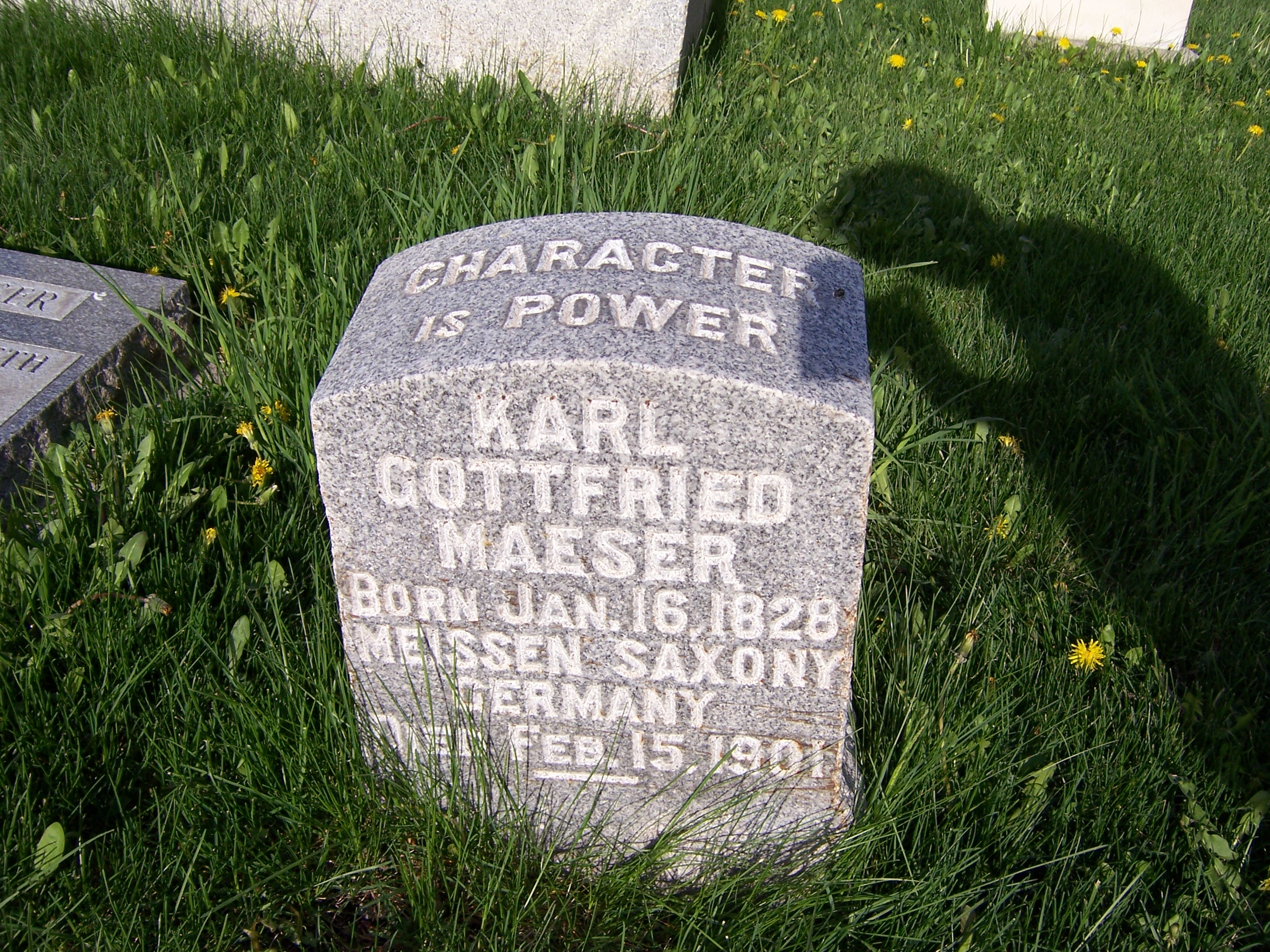
Maeser's grave marker

Maeser's health had been declining, although he continued working. Maeser died in his home on February 15, 1901. His ideas on educational philosophy, the honor system, and incorporation of religious classes continue to be implemented at Brigham Young University, where the Maeser Building is named after him.

A song was written in Maeser's memory, "Come, Lay His Books and Papers By". The words were written by Annie Pike Greenwood and the music by L. D. Edwards. This song became an LDS hymn and appeared in the 1948 edition of the church's hymnal.

Maeser also inspired a sister-city relationship between Meissen, where he was born, and Provo, Utah. A public charter high school named Karl G. Maeser Preparatory Academy was established in Lindon, Utah, in 2007.
