= Benjamin Cluff =

First president of Brigham Young University

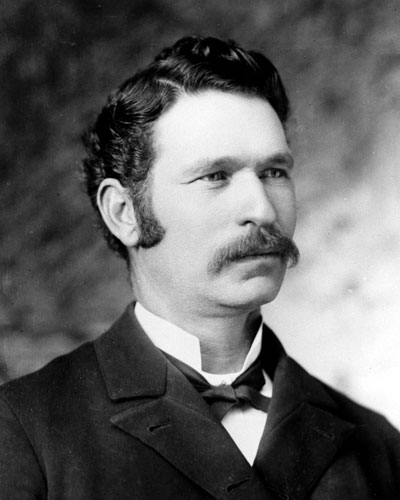

President of Brigham Young University
- In office October 1903 – December 1903
- Succeeded by: George H. Brimhall

Principal of Brigham Young Academy
- In office January 1892 – October 1903
- Preceded by: Karl G. Maeser

Personal details
- Born: February 7, 1858 Provo, Utah
- Died: June 14, 1948 (aged 90) Los Angeles, California
- Education: University of Michigan

Benjamin Cluff Jr. (February 7, 1858 – June 14, 1948) was the first president of Brigham Young University and its third principal. Under his administration, the student body and faculty more than doubled in size, and the school went from an academy to a university, and was officially incorporated by the Church of Jesus Christ of Latter-day Saints. Cluff changed class periods from half an hour to a full hour, adopted the official colors of the university, started summer school and the Alumni Association, encouraged the university's first student newspaper (White and Blue), provided the first student loans, and developed an intercollegiate sports system.

== Early life ==
Benjamin Cluff was a native of Provo and was born to Benjamin Sr. and Mary Ellen Foster Cluff in 1858. When he was 4 years old, his family moved to Logan, Utah. They then moved to Hawaii when Cluff was 7 years old because his father was serving a mission there. The family worked at a church owned plantation for cotton and sugar cane. They returned to Utah in 1870. Cluff later lived in Coalville, Utah with his uncle where he became the city librarian at age 17 because of his love of reading.

In 1877, he walked 67 miles from Coalville to Provo in order to start his studies at Brigham Young Academy, where he studied in the Normal Department. When he first started school he worked as a janitor, but after one year he became an instructor in the Primary Department at Brigham Young Academy. He then went on a 3-year mission for the Church of Jesus Christ of Latter-day Saints to the Hawaiian Islands in 1879. In 1882 he returned to teach at the academy, teaching everything from language to bookkeeping. He also helped the fire brigade in Provo when the Lewis Building, which was the original location of Brigham Young Academy, caught on fire.

In 1886, he received approval for a leave of absence to go to the University of Michigan and was set apart to study there by John W. Taylor. While studying in Michigan, Cluff joined a prestigious student organization called the Adelphi Society. He worked closely with professors in the fields of astronomy and engineering, and became good friends with James Burrill Angell, president of the university. Cluff received his bachelor's degree from the University of Michigan in 1890. He also served as president of the Ann Arbor Branch of the LDS church while there. At the time he left for the University of Michigan, Cluff had two wives, Mary the daughter of David John and Harriet "Hattie" Cullimore.

== Principal of Brigham Young Academy ==
After receiving his degree, Cluff returned to Brigham Young Academy and became the assistant principal. Although the board voted unanimously to make Cluff assistant principal, much of the faculty at the academy were apprehensive because of Cluff's ties to education in the East and their distrust in eastern influences at the academy. When Karl G. Maeser, the acting principal of the academy, returned from an extended trip, he found that many of the affairs of the academy, especially financial affairs, were in disarray and because of Maeser's reaction, Cluff resigned as assistant principal. A few months later the board rejected Cluff's resignation. By late 1891, Karl G. Maeser had to be replaced as principal of Brigham Young Academy because he had been called to oversee the entire LDS education program as superintendent of church schools, and was unable to do both jobs.

=== Church University ===
On January 4, 1892, the principalship of Brigham Young Academy was passed from Maeser to Cluff. This occurred on the same day that approximately one thousand people were gathered for the dedication of the new Academy Building. After becoming principal, there were many pressing matters that Cluff had to address. One of those matters was the proposed formation of an LDS university in Salt Lake City. Many worried that this would affect the academy by taking away some of its most prestigious teachers, including Cluff who had been offered a position there. Fortunately for the academy, Cluff did not go to the LDS College. When the Circular Number Eight, a document that restricted the right of existing LDS schools in order to centralize the new Church University, was created by the General Board of Education, Cluff and other leaders of major church schools tried to fight back against certain provisions of the document. One provision that Cluff feared was the restriction of church schools other than the new Church University to give degrees to their students.

Although the leaders of the major LDS schools were apprehensive about the idea of creating a Church University, many of the most prestigious of these educators were called to be members of the committee charged with the responsibility to organize the new Church University. Along with Cluff, the committee consisted of Karl G. Maeser, and James E. Talmage from the academy, plus James Sharp, and Willard Young. The next day, the committee proposed that the new university be called "The University of the Church of Jesus Christ of Latter-day Saints" or the "Church University". After nationwide financial issues, church leadership decided to suspend any further efforts to create the Church University and proceeded to give their support to the University of Utah in Salt Lake City. After continuous financial struggles, the academy was able to stay open, but because of the death of Abraham O. Smoot who was a generous benefactor of the academy, the financial struggles lasted longer than other periods of financial challenges.

In 1893, Cluff went back to the University of Michigan to work on a master's degree and left George H. Brimhall as acting president.

=== Changes under Cluff ===
Cluff's methods as principal have been described as nearly opposite those of Maeser. Maeser was insular and conservative in his teaching methods. He kept his teachings well within the LDS world, and adhered to classical education standards. Cluff was more open to new ideas and methods. He also believed that the world outside Mormonism had a lot to offer the school. Cluff often referred to his time as administrator of the academy as the "New Epoch" because of his commitment to academic excellence and his motto, "learn to do by doing". At the beginning of Cluff's principalship, the administration continued to strictly enforce the rules of the academy as the Maeser administration had done, but over time Cluff helped the academy transfer that power to the students themselves. This helped to establish an atmosphere of discipline and responsibility maintained by the students through self-governance.

Before Cluff's principalship, Brigham Young Academy was still more like a present-day high school than a university. Cluff, however began implementing several changes to the school according to his experiences at Michigan. He began separation of the college from the high school, giving older students access to higher level materials. The Collegiate Department of Brigham Young Academy was officially established in 1896 and was an extension of the college-level courses that Cluff had been teaching since becoming principal. He also introduced an athletics program, which included baseball, football, and track and field. The football program was quickly closed by the board of trustees because many colleges at this time frowned on athletics programs and because the sport was an "abomination to the spirit." Cluff also helped implement many programs that were ahead of their time such as adding a military department, a summer school, a school song, and psychology classes. He also extended the length of class from thirty minutes to one hour blocks. The school was privately supported by members of the community, and was not absorbed and sponsored officially by the LDS Church until July 18, 1896.

Around 1894, Cluff was finding it increasingly difficult to find qualified teachers who were willing to take the salary that the academy was able to offer them. Another recurring problem was the academy's teacher retention because of mission assignments from the church that required the instructors to leave their teaching jobs and dedicate all of their energies to their missionary efforts. That same year, Cluff was able to hire a handful of non-Mormon teachers after much resistance from Maeser and Brigham Young Jr. Although hiring teachers outside of the Mormon community was Cluff's doing, he also saw the importance of training high quality teachers within the Mormon community. In order to accomplish this goal, Cluff started a "Normal Training School" which gave free lessons to students who were interested in teaching. This approach proved to be successful, and the normal school supplied experienced and qualified teachers to the schools in the region.

In May 1898, College Hall was built in order to provide more space for the upper division students of the academy's Collegiate Department. Even with the added space, many students at the academy were cramped because of the continuous increase in enrollment. The school continued to have success with the dedication and opening of the annual Brigham Young Academy Summer School. Another successful initiative that Cluff suggested was the implementation of a Missionary Training Program in 1899 for prospective missionaries of the LDS church.

=== Expedition to Central and South America ===
In 1899, Cluff outlined his proposal to take Academy students on an expedition to ancient Book of Mormon ruins and complete other related historical studies in Central and South America. Church leadership approved Cluff's plans, and he began preparing for the trip. He had to select the men who would accompany him, getting needed funding, and better organize the studies that would take place during the expedition. The men who were part of the expedition were set apart on 7 April 1900 and 10 days later they embarked on their expedition, leaving George Brimhall as acting principal of the academy. As they journeyed through Southern Utah, for the first 16 days of the journey they were met by feasts and celebrations in many of the cities that they entered. After leaving predominately Mormon areas, members of the expedition began to go off in pairs to act as missionaries in the cities that they passed through. The expedition stopped in Thatcher Arizona for a month while Cluff went to visit Florence Reynolds, who was a teacher at the Juarez Academy in the Mormon Colonies in Mexico and would become Cluff's second wife. The young men in the company were getting restless because of the significant delay in their journey, and after their month-long wait, they continued towards the Mexican border and began to familiarize themselves with Mexican culture.

Heber J. Grant went and visited the expedition camp which had stopped in Nogales, on the border of Mexico. Once he returned to Utah to report his findings, the First Presidency and Quorum of the Twelve Apostles decided that because the members of the expedition were not well experienced travelers and were not proving to be completely compliant with the rules that they were taught at the academy, a letter was sent to Joseph F. Smith. He met with Cluff and expressed the concern of church leadership and recommended the termination of the trip. Even as he was told to cease the venture, Cluff ignored this counsel and proceeded with the journey. Although Cluff decided to continue, some members of his expedition party decided to return to Provo, leaving only 9 members of the expedition party, including Cluff. They passed through many Mormon settlements in Mexico and had many hardships including starvation, illness, and fatigue. After nearly two years of travel, the expedition ran out of supplies, had problems with securing safe passage through Colombia, and was forced to turn back. Cluff finally returned to his position in 1902, but was accused of various improprieties, including sexual immorality by his assistant Walter Wolfe. Cluff was forced to resign. The charges of immorality stemmed from a post-Manifesto marriage between Cluff and twenty-five-year-old Florence Mary Reynolds conducted in Mexico. Cluff had obtained permission for the marriage from Joseph F. Smith.

=== Founding of Brigham Young University ===
In Cluff's last official act, he proposed to the board that the academy be named "Brigham Young University". At first there was a large amount of opposition to this. Many members of the board thought that the school wasn't large enough to be a university. However, the decision ultimately passed. One opponent to the decision, Anthon H. Lund, later said, "I hope their head will grow big enough for their hat."

In 2012, the Benjamin Cluff Plant Science Laboratory building at 550 East 800 North was razed and the Life Science building constructed in its place. Currently, there is no building on the BYU campus named after Benjamin Cluff, the last principal of Brigham Young Academy and first president of Brigham Young University.

== Later life ==
After resigning in 1903, Cluff moved to Mexico to establish a rubber plantation and once again had trouble in Mexico. At one point he was held by bandits for 2 weeks and during his absence his family was robbed. He worked with mahogany and shipped some lumber to California which caused him to decide to move his family to California, where he opened a grocery store and gas station. He died on June 14, 1948, at the age of 90.

== Family life ==
Cluff was husband to three wives and fathered 25 children. Two of his wives were sisters, Eliza Arnette Foster (1841-1880) and Mary Ellen Foster (1837-1907).

== Notes ==
- Cannon, Brian Q., "Shaping BYU: The Presidential Administration of Benjamin Cluff Jr", BYU Studies, 48 (2): 4–40, archived from the original on 2014-10-22

Academic offices
New creation	President of Brigham Young University; October 1903 – December 1903	Succeeded by George H. Brimhall
Preceded by Karl G. Maeser	Principal of Brigham Young Academy; January 1892 – October 1903	Academy split to become Brigham Young University and Brigham Young High School.
