= Stephen Dusenberry =

American drummer

Stephen Dusenberry is an American drummer/producer/remixer from Pittsburgh, PA. He is most known for his work as a drummer in the band Gramsci Melodic and for producing remixes for artists such as Audio Playground and Kim Cameron, both of whom scored hits on both Billboard's Hot Dance Club Play and Hot Dance Airplay charts. Additionally, Dusenberry wrote, played drums and keyboards in the jazz fusion duo Motometer. In March, 2014, Dusenberry had a Billboard Number 1 remix with Audio Playground's "Hands Up in the Air".
