= Walter Dusenbery =

American sculptor (born 1939)

- Born: September 21, 1939 (age 87); Alameda, California, US
- Occupation: sculptor

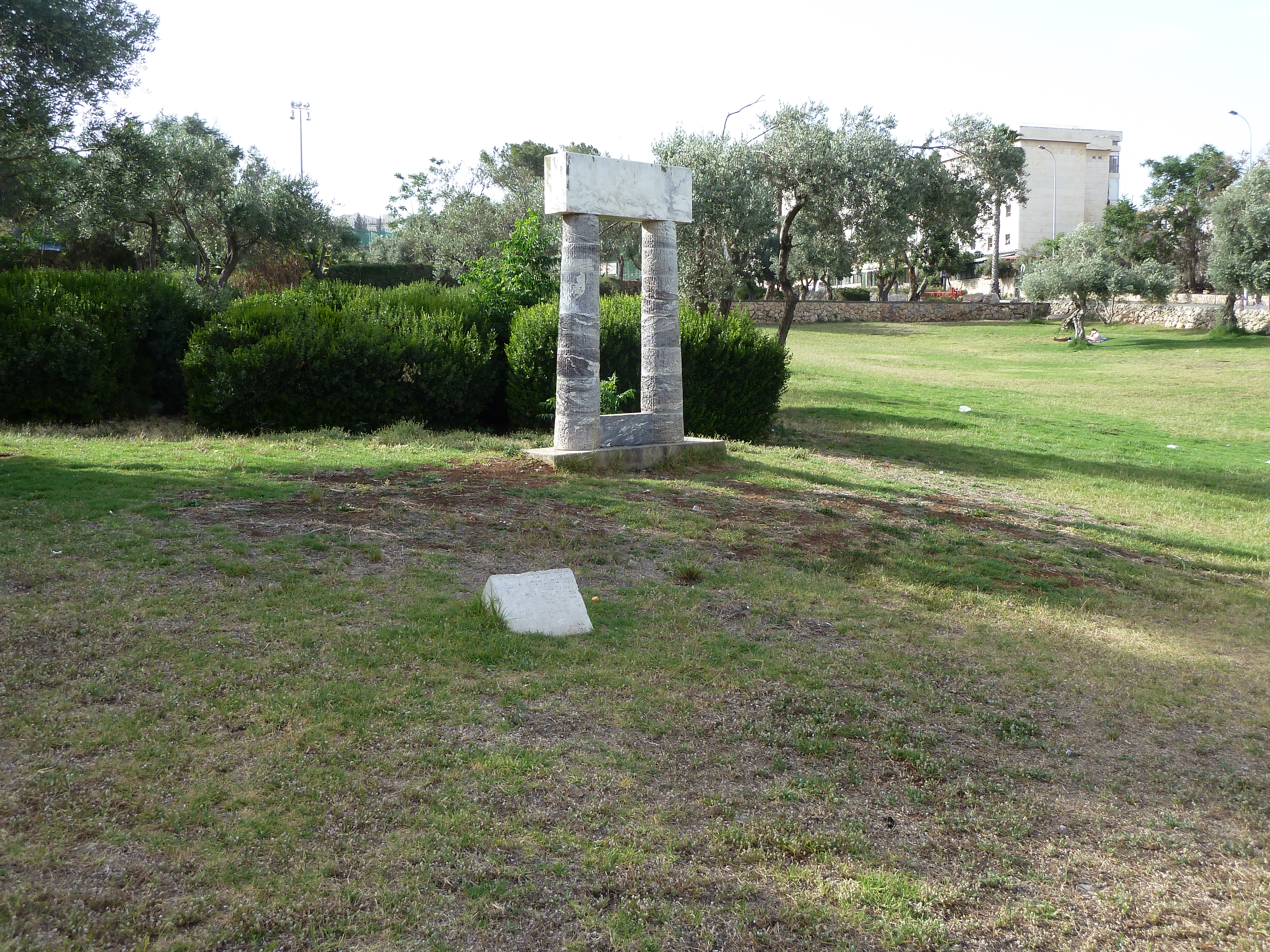
"Porta Barga" in Jerusalem

Muro, at Laumeier Sculpture Park in St. Louis, Missouri, 1975

Walter Dusenbery (born September 21, 1939 in Alameda, California) is an American sculptor. He attended the San Francisco Art Institute, earned an MFA from California College of Arts and Crafts, and then studied in Japan and Italy under Isamu Noguchi. He also held teaching positions at Harvard University and University of California, Berkeley Graduate School of Design. From 1971 to 1988, he lived both in Pietrasanta, Italy, and in Little Italy, New York City.

Dusenbery's preferred material is stone, particularly travertine or granite. Dusenbery has a particular interest in adding sculpture to public places, such as federal buildings, to humanize the space, but in 1988, he assembled a show of small, entirely hand-carved alabaster sculptures, called "Walter Dusenbery, The Personal Side," at the Fendrick Gallery in Washington, D.C.

That same year, 1988, he was awarded a large commission for the Fulton County Building Atrium in Atlanta, Georgia. The commission was for three fountains and related structures over three stories in height, designed for informal and ceremonial public events. After completion of the "Atlantacropolis," Dusenbery withdrew from the gallery world and focused his energy on site-specific commissions. Seeking a large-scale stone studio for projects closer to home, he discovered there were none. In 1995, he approached sculptor and patron of sculpture J. Seward Johnson Jr. with the idea of creating a state-of-the-art stone-carving studio, so that American sculptors would not have to travel abroad to realize their work. Johnson agreed to fund such a facility, if Dusenbery would direct it.

In 1996, Dusenbery designed the facility for the Stone Division at Johnson Atelier Technical Institute of Sculpture, and was its first director. The facility was situated in "a building resembling an airplane hangar," complete with the most advanced computer numerically controlled (CNC) stone-milling machines built for sculpture fabrication, an indoor observation tower, and overhead cranes capable of lifting up to 30 tons. The studio offered the ability to digitally scan three-dimensional forms. The digital files generated offered new creative opportunities of manipulation and could be seamlessly exported for extremely accurate carving by the CNC milling machines from massive blocks of stone. The Stone Division was a success and attracted a strong group of sculptors: Magdalena Abakanowicz, Lawrence Argent, Barry X Ball, Jon Isherwood, and Manolo Valdes, to name a few. Dusenbery continued to direct and produce work at the Stone Division until 2003, when it became necessary to reorganize the studio. It was redeveloped as the Digital Stone Project by the clients of the Stone Division as a not-for-profit in 2004. Dusenbery was named President of the Board and remained in that position until 2008.

Dusenbery was given Stone World's "Technological Achievement Award" in 1999, which recognizes stone workers who innovate, share, and promote new technologies in the industry.

Other awards include the 1985 Augustus Saint-Gaudens Memorial Prize in 1985, Deutscher Akademischer Austasch Dienst in 1982, National Endowment for the Arts Fellowship in 1981 and Creative Arts Service Grant in 1980.

Dusenbery received the commission for the entrance to the Presidential Trauma Center serving the Northwest in 2009. The entrance relief is 75 feet long and ten feet high. Titled "In the Garden," it is made with six variously colored marbles and comprises three formal garden views, a metaphor for man's work with nature. The work was installed in late 2011 at the Harborview Hospital in Seattle, Washington.
