= Brigham Young University student life =

Student life at Brigham Young University is heavily influenced by the Church of Jesus Christ of Latter-day Saints. The school is privately owned by the church and aims to create an atmosphere in which secular and religious principles are taught in the same classroom.

== Religion ==
=== LDS atmosphere ===
Brigham Young University's stated purpose is to "assist individuals in their quest for perfection and eternal life". It is common for prayers to be spoken in classes. This tradition began during the time when Brigham Young was actively involved with the university.

BYU is considered by many Latter-day Saints to be "The Lord's University". This phrase is used in reference to the school's perceived mission as an "ambassador" to the world for the LDS Church and thus, for Jesus Christ. In the past, students and faculty have expressed dissatisfaction with this nickname, as it sometimes gives students the idea that university authorities are always divinely inspired and never to be contradicted. Leaders of the school, however, acknowledge that the nickname represents more a goal that the university strives for, and not its current state of being. Leaders encourage students and faculty to help fulfill the goal by following the teachings of their religion, adhering to the school's honor code, and serving others with the knowledge they gain while attending.

=== Religious activity ===
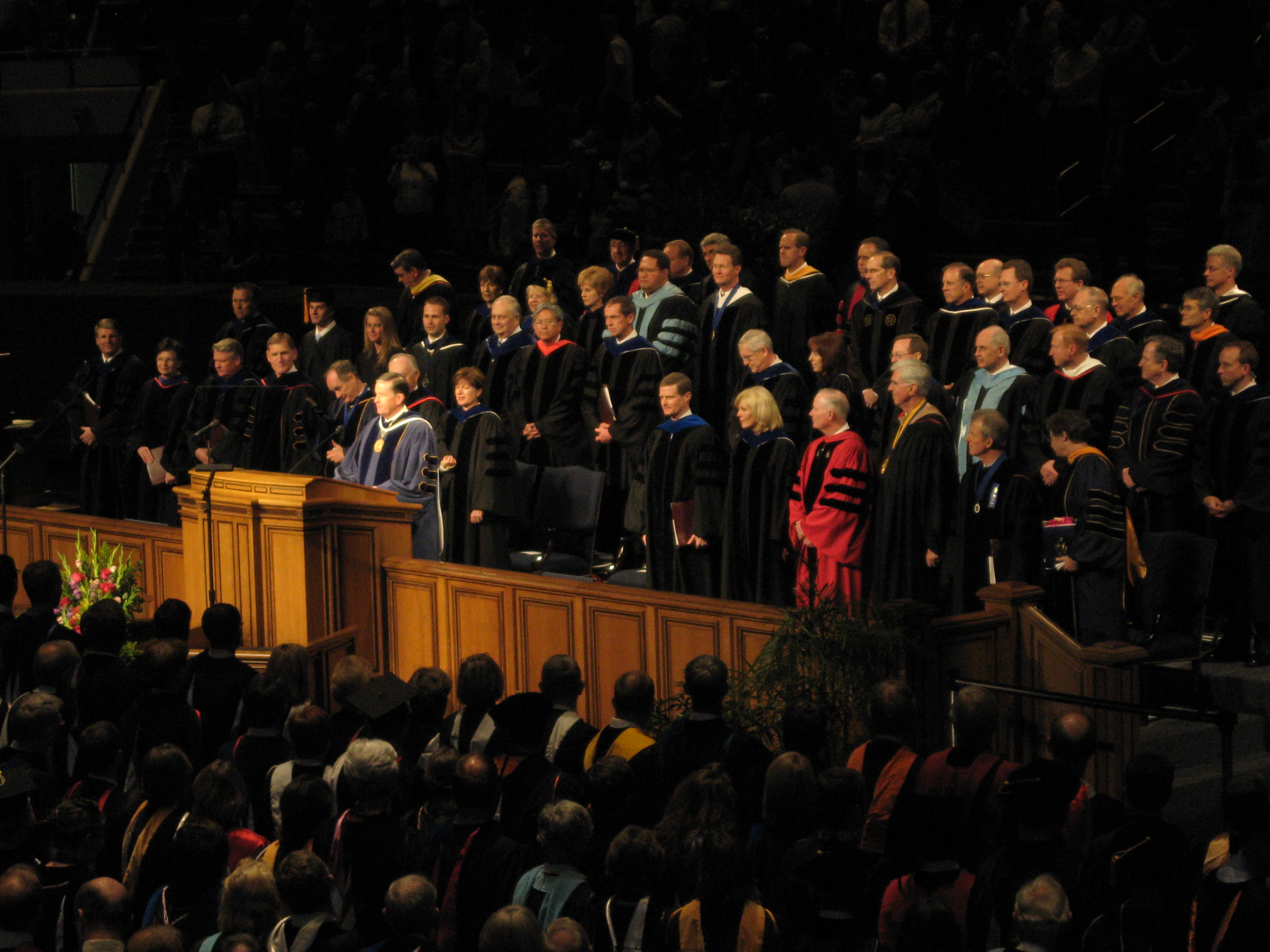
April 2008 BYU graduation ceremony where LDS Church Apostle David A. Bednar offered the commencement address

BYU mandates that its students be religiously active. Students and faculty who are LDS are required to submit an affidavit (called an "ecclesiastical endorsement") stating that they are active participants in the LDS Church. The affidavit must be signed by LDS church leaders and be resubmitted annually. Non-LDS students are asked to provide a similar endorsement from an ecclesiastic (religious) leader of their choice with their application for admittance, as well as an annual review similar to the one LDS students undergo. All undergraduate students, regardless of their religion, must take 14 semester hours of religious courses to graduate. Students have a degree of flexibility with these religious courses, although they must take at least one course covering the Book of Mormon, one covering the Doctrine and Covenants, and one covering the New Testament.

== Honor code ==
All students and faculty, regardless of religion, are required to agree to adhere to an honor code. Early forms of the BYU Honor Code are found as far back as the days of the Brigham Young Academy and early school President Karl G. Maeser. A signed commitment to live the honor code is part of the application process, and must be adhered by all students, faculty, and staff. Students and faculty found in violation of standards are either warned or called to meet with representatives of the Honor Council. In rare cases, students and faculty can be expelled from the school or lose tenure.

== Culture ==
BYU's social and cultural atmosphere is unique. The high rate of enrollment at the university by members of The Church of Jesus Christ of Latter-day Saints results in an amplification of LDS cultural norms; BYU was ranked by The Princeton Review in 2008 as 14th in the nation for having the happiest students and highest quality of life.

=== Dating and marriage ===
Brigham Young University is known for emphasizing a "marriage culture". Due to the many factors such as Latter-day Saint beliefs and university encouragement, courtship and marriage are very important aspects of BYU's social scene. Those same religious beliefs have also resulted in an unwelcome atmosphere for students who are not heterosexual and policies that explicitly ban homosexual relationships.

Dating is a common activity at Brigham Young University. BYU's dating culture is much different from that of other universities. Norval Glenn and Elizabeth Marquardt studied the "dating and mating" habits of typical college students in their study "Hooking Up, Hanging Out, and Hoping for Mr. Right." Of 1000 college women surveyed, only half reported going on six or more dates in their four years of college. Conversely, according to research done by professors at BYU in their study titled "A Survey of Dating and Marriage at BYU," 88% of BYU students reported going on at least one date a month. Even more, 15% of the student population reported going on six or more dates each month. In the same study, 57% of students at BYU reportedly felt they dated "not often enough".

In 2005, 22% of the student population was married. In 2005, 51% of BYU's graduating class were married. In the same year, only 3% of Yale's graduating class were married. And as a national average, 11% of the college class of 2005 were married. The graduating class of 2010 yielded 6147 graduates, 56% of which were married.

According to a study done by BYU professors, students at BYU feel marriage is a high priority. More specifically, 95% of BYU students rank "marrying in the temple" as a "very important" goal, second only to "a close personal relationship with God". On the other hand, a survey of American High School Seniors showed that 78% of typical college age Americans rank marriage as an important goal in life. Similarly, Glenn and Marquardt report in their study that 83% of the women surveyed ranked marriage as an important goal in life. As a whole, students at BYU place a higher emphasis on marriage as a life goal than other college age Americans; however, across the board, college aged Americans place a considerably high emphasis on marriage as a life goal. Most students at BYU foresee marriage in their very near futures, with 94% of BYU students feeling that marriage would be a part of their lives in the next five to ten years. Comparatively, 71% of the women surveyed by Norvall and Marquardt saw marriage in their near futures and 29% reported that marriage would be "hard to fit in with my other plans ... when I look ahead five to ten years".

As a university, BYU is extremely supportive of marriage. For example, The Daily Universe—the student run newspaper at BYU—publishes a Bridal Guide each summer. The course selection at BYU reflects an emphasis on marriage. While many universities offer one or two marriage and family classes to their students, BYU offers courses focused on mate selection, marriage preparation, marriage enhancement, marriage therapy, and multiple classes aimed at strengthening the family. On a higher level, the weekly university devotionals and quarterly Church Educational System Firesides (often held at BYU's Marriott Center) often center on the topics of dating and marriage. Members of church leadership such as apostle Richard G. Scott urge young men to "not waste time in idle pursuits, but [to] serve a mission for the Church, then make marriage their highest priority". Overall, students at Brigham Young University are urged often by church leaders and school leaders to wed.

On many college campuses, sexual encounters are common. For instance, in Norval Glenn and Elizabeth Marquardt's study "Hooking Up, Hanging Out, and Hoping for Mr. Right," of 1,000 college women surveyed, 90% reported "hooking up"—non-committal sexual encounters—to be a regular occurrence on their respective campuses. Even more, 40% of these women have participated personally in a "hook up". However, at BYU, only about 4% of the student population reported sexual activity within dating and less than 1% of the student population reported sexual activity outside of dating (aka "hooking up"), according to "A Survey of Dating and Marriage at BYU". This abstinence from sexual activity is caused by both personal religious values and BYU's Honor Code, a contract each student signs prohibiting activities including sexual intercourse. Students breaking these rules may face expulsion from the university. While at other universities, a "hook up" is typically defined by sexual activity, around 2% of the student population at BYU reported passionate kissing done outside of dating. This tamer form of "hooking up" has generally become known among the BYU student community as a NCMO (/ˈnɪkmoʊ/), or "noncommittal make out".

The LDS church places strong emphasis on marriage in its teachings. In fact, celestial marriage is considered an ordinance necessary to exaltation. Members of the church of Jesus Christ of Latter-day Saints firmly believe that their mission on earth is to marry and have a family. As a whole, Latter-day Saints are known to marry young. Compared to Protestants, Catholics, Methodists, and Jews, members of the Church of Jesus Christ of Latter-day Saints are the youngest to wed. Most likely, Latter-day Saints marry young because of the importance the LDS church places on marriage and family. The belief that "the family is central to the Creator’s plan for the eternal destiny of His children" furthers the LDS belief in the importance of marriage.

=== Crime and drug levels ===
Brigham Young University's Honor Code, which all BYU students agree to as a condition of studying at BYU, prohibits the consumption of alcoholic beverages, tobacco, etc. As mentioned earlier, The Princeton Review has rated BYU the "#1 stone cold sober school" in the nation for several years running, an honor which the late LDS Church president Gordon B. Hinckley commented on with pride. The school's strait-laced reputation is a major selling point in athletic recruiting. As non-LDS players have become ever more important to the school's teams, BYU's wholesomeness is often attractive for prospective students who prefer an academic or social environment without alcohol, illegal drug abuse, and violent crime. According to the Uniform Crime Reports, incidents of crime in Provo are lower than the national average. Murder is rare, and robberies are about 1/10 the national average.

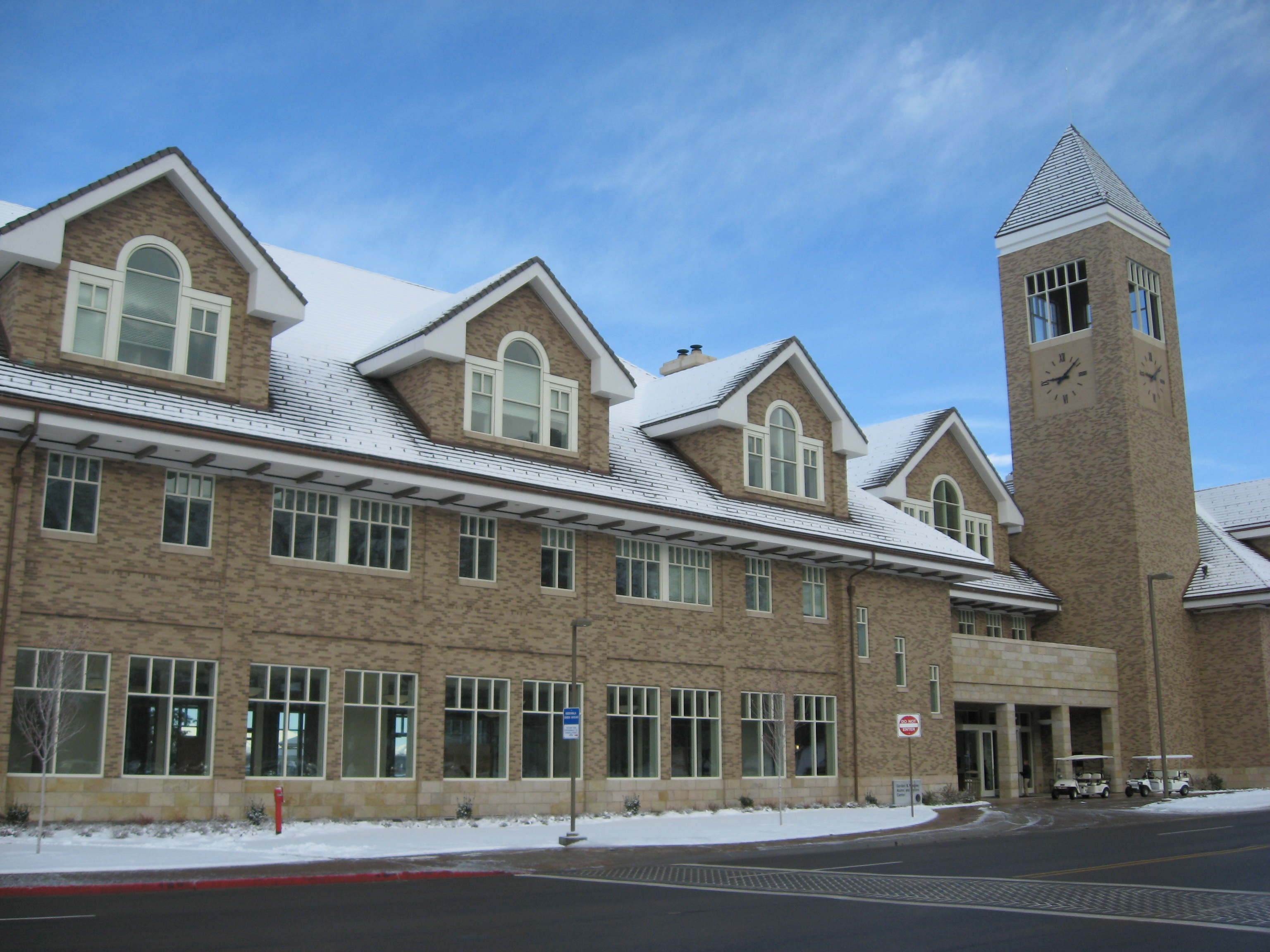
Gordon B. Hinckley Alumni & Visitors Center

== Race and gender issues ==
In the 1970s, several schools protested against BYU, claiming it was a racist organization; Stanford and San José State both refused to play the university in sports. In 1970, the University of Arizona sent a "fact-finding committee" to determine if BYU was racist, finding that "rhetoric had escalated too far" with regards to racism and the Western Athletic Conference. The BYU newspaper The Daily Universe reported that Arizona's committee determined that BYU was not racist, but was an "isolated institution whose members simply do not relate to or understand black people." BYU football players were met by 75 picketers demonstrating against racism at BYU when they played Arizona a week after the report.

In April 1992 during Take Back the Night, an on-campus women's rights group marched in protest at the university's lack of a Women's Resource Center. They feared that by not having such a center BYU was not giving enough aid to female students who were the victims of rape and abuse. By December 1992, a center had been approved. Then-BYU President Rex E. Lee said that the decision of the board of directors to approve the building of the center was unanimous.

In February 2012, a YouTube video called "What do you know about black history?" of students at BYU surfaced, exemplifying some students' knowledge about Black History Month and African Americans in general. The interviewer himself does Blackface while asking students a variety of questions.

In 2022, five Black students from the university went viral after starting the Black Menaces, a social media based group that interviews BYU students and occasionally faculty about race, gender, sexuality, and politics. The questions they ask are meant to reveal the attitudes about race on campus, especially within the LDS faith, and start conversations about the inequities that people of color face at BYU. They have garnered a large fan base–as of 2023, they have nearly one million followers on TikTok.
