= David B. Dusenbery =

American biophysicist

David B. Dusenbery is a biophysicist with a central interest in how information influences the behavior of organisms. In later years, he also considered the physical constraints hydrodynamics imposes on microorganisms and gametes.

== Research ==
Most of Dusenbery's research deals with how information controls behavior. At Caltech and the early years at Georgia Tech, Dusenbery focused on experimental studies of the nematode Caenorhabditis elegans because of its small nervous system and favorable genetics.

These experimental studies inspired the development of several innovative techniques:

- Countercurrent separation for isolating mutant individuals altered in their tendency to swim toward a chemical.
- A method for applying controlled stimulation to an individual nematode and recording its responses.
- A method using computer analysis of live video to simultaneously track many individuals and record changes in their locomotion.
- The video tracking method was even used as a detector of sensory stimuli emanating from a gas chromatograph.
- Dusenbery had several students who developed a variety of techniques employing nematodes for inexpensive testing of samples (industrial or environmental) for several kinds of toxicity.

Initially, Dusenbery was attempting to understand the flow of information in the nervous system of this simple animal. Later, he turned to the flow of information outside the organism, and how physics constrains how organisms behave. More recently, he has also considered hydrodynamic constraints on small organisms, which can only swim at low speeds, where viscosity is far more important than inertia (low Reynolds numbers).

From physical analysis, Dusenbery predicted that the long-held belief that bacteria were too small to employ spatial sensing mechanisms to follow chemical gradients was erroneous and predicted that bacteria following steep gradients of chemicals at high concentrations would benefit from using a spatial mechanism. In 2003, a new bacterial species was discovered that swim sideways and respond to differences in oxygen concentration at the two ends of the cell, allowing them to follow steep gradients of oxygen.

Similar considerations have also been applied to the behaviors of gametes, leading to an explanation of why the sperm/egg (ovum) and thus the male/female distinctions exist.

== Notable publications ==
=== Books ===
- Dusenbery, David B. (1992). Sensory Ecology: How Organisms Acquire and Respond to Information. W.H. Freeman, New York. ISBN 0-7167-2333-6.
- Dusenbery, David B. (1996). “Life at Small Scale: The Behavior of Microbes”. Scientific American Library. ISBN 0-7167-5060-0.
- Dusenbery, David B. (2009). “Living at Micro Scale: The Unexpected Physics of Being Small”. Harvard University Press. ISBN 978-0-674-03116-6.

=== Research papers ===
- Dusenbery, D.B. (1996). Information is where you find it. Biol. Bull. 191:124-128.
- Dusenbery, D.B. (1997). Minimum size limit for useful locomotion by free-swimming microbes. Proc. Natl. Acad. Sci. USA 94:10949-10954.
- Dusenbery, D.B. (1998). Fitness landscapes for effects of shape on chemotaxis and other behaviors of bacteria. J. Bacteriol. 180 (22):5978-5983.
- Dusenbery, D.B. (2000). Selection for high gamete encounter rates explains the success of male and female mating types. J. Theoret. Biol. 202:1-10.
- Dusenbery, D.B. (2002). Ecological Models Explaining the Success of Distinctive Sperm and Eggs (Oogamy). J. Theoretical Biol. 219:1-7.
- Dusenbery, D.B. (2006). Selection for high gamete encounter rates explains the evolution of anisogamy using plausible assumptions about size relationships of swimming speed and duration. J. Theoretical Biol. 241:33-8.
