= Warren Newton Dusenberry =

American mayor

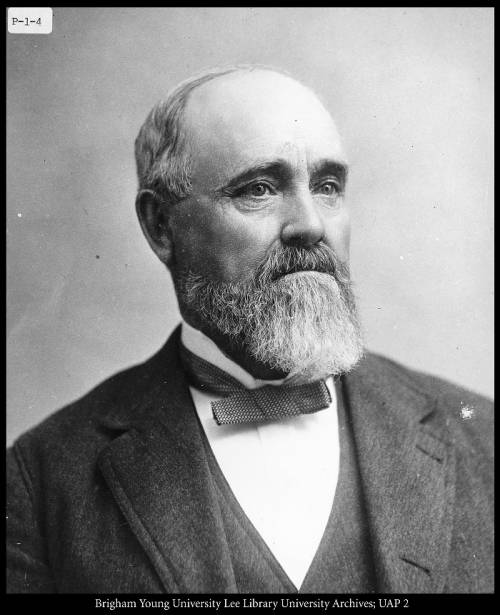

Principal of Brigham Young Academy (later Brigham Young University)
- In office December 1875 – April 1876
- Succeeded by: Karl G. Maeser

Mayor of Provo, Utah
- In office 1892-1893

Personal details
- Born: November 1, 1836 White Haven, Pennsylvania
- Died: March 31, 1915 (aged 78)

Warren Newton Dusenberry (November 1, 1836 – March 31, 1915) was the founding principal of Brigham Young Academy in 1876. Before becoming principal of Brigham Young Academy, Dusenberry was the founder of three other schools in Provo, Utah. Dusenberry was only a temporary principal and was succeeded by Karl G. Maeser. He also served as County Judge of Utah County and mayor of Provo.

== Early years and family ==
Dusenberry was born in White Haven, Pennsylvania. In 1840 he moved with his parents to Pike County, Illinois, which was located near Mormon headquarters.

In 1846, shortly after the move his mother joined the Church of Jesus Christ of Latter Day Saints, but his father did not. Due to this, when the majority of the Latter Day Saints moved to Utah the Dusenberry family remained in Illinois.

In 1860, the Dusenberry family began the trek west and stopped in Provo, Utah Territory to visit their mother's brother Howard Coray. After their visit to Provo, the Dusenberry family continued on to Los Angeles, California where they lived for six months before moving to northern California near Sacramento. In California Warren Dusenberry studied at Vacaville College, which was a Methodist high school.

In 1862 Dusenberry moved with his mother, brother Wilson, and two sisters to Provo, leaving his father and one brother behind in California.

== First Ward School ==
After settling in Provo, Dusenberry began teaching at a Mormon school called the "First Ward School" in the basement of the tabernacle. Seeing that the school needed materials, he went to Salt Lake City and spent $50 out of his own pocket in order to buy materials for the "First Ward School". Because the school was growing rapidly it caused the church leaders, who were also the school administrators, to move the school into a large house with two stories. This pattern of relocating to more spacious venues continued with multiple other building because of Dusenberry's popularity as a school teacher. At one point he was teaching 62 students on his own. Later many accounts of his struggle to maintain order in the classroom came to light. Even with said difficulties in the classroom and the financial difficulties surrounding the school, Dusenberry often commented on how much he enjoyed teaching. The school grew in popularity and numbers and eventually Warren decided to "establish a school of his own."

== Dusenberry School ==
In 1863, Warren Dusenberry opened the Dusenberry School, also called Provo High School, which was actually a "graded" elementary school. He rented "cluff hall" on 2nd north and 2nd east, which had enough room for the expected enrollment and for theatrical activities and other features that fit Dusenberry's teaching style. The school was furnished with desks that Dusenberry made by hand and had 83 students when its doors first opened. Because Warren and Wilson Dusenberry were the only administrators at the school while it was being established, they took care of all responsibilities including teaching and cleaning. Warren took over the teaching of the more advanced classes while Wilson taught the novice students. They promoted extracurricular activities including participating in after school debates, playing ball, acting, and learning to play instruments (Dusenberry taught the accordion). The Dusenberry brothers were forced to live at the school because of their obligation to this new investment, initially sleeping on the hardwood floor

In the spring of 1864, the Dusenberry School was more popular than ever. With a capacity of 103 students, some of the 120 students who enrolled for that semester had to be turned away. The Dusenberry brothers were into dramatic acting and helped acting become a popular activity among young people in Provo. Many say that the Dusenberry brothers helped the people of Provo realize Brigham Young's vision of education and culture in the Mormon community.

In the spring of 1865 schools in the Provo area were still struggling financially, including the Dusenberry School. As the president of the county board of education, Dusenberry attempted to improve the quality of teachers and materials in the classroom, but because of limited funds, his efforts were in vain. Because tuition was often paid in commodities or services rendered, the Dusenberrys struggled to pay rent for their school building, especially after the price nearly tripled. In order to bring in extra money, Dusenberry farmed during the summers, served on a grand jury, and took part in other civic happenings.

In 1867, the Dusenberry brothers opened a general store, helped in the Provo Post Office, and took over the Provo telegraph agency. Dusenberry also took on the role county tax assessor, county school examiner, and the county road district road district. After taking up other interests and becoming discouraged by so many financial setbacks, the Dusenberry School closed after the spring of 1865 and would not reopen for another 4 years.

== Second Dusenberry School ==
In 1869, the Dusenberry brothers along with their new colleague James E. Daniels, organized the Second Dusenberry School in the Kinsey Building on Center Street in Provo. Once the school opened they faced many of the same problems that they had encountered with the first Dusenberry School. They did not have enough room for all of the students who enrolled, but this time they were able to expand to some vacant rooms in the Lewis hall next door. The Dusenberry school helped form a solid educational system in Provo, and helped Provo become an important educational center in Utah.

== Timpanogos Branch of the University of Deseret ==
The University of Deseret was established in 1850, and although it was located in the Salt Lake Valley, just like the schools in Provo, the university struggled with financial problems and was closed from 1853-1868. When the university was reestablished in Mar. 1869, the popularity and quality of the second Dusenberry School made it a prime candidate to be the first branch of the university, and it was converted into the Timpanogos Branch. From 1870 to 1875, Dusenberry was the principal the University of Deseret's Timpanogos Branch (also called Timpanogos University), but for much of his time in that position he was not able to be a full-time administrator. In 1871, Dusenberry was sent to New York to help with the emigration office. When he returned home he focused more on civil duties and the practice of law than being in the classroom. After more financial struggles, the Timpanogos Branch was closed in April 1875.

== Brigham Young Academy ==
In April 1875, Brigham Young, George Q. Cannon, and Dusenberry began to make plans for the opening of a new school that would be called Brigham Young Academy. The land that had once belonged to the Timpanogos Branch would now be used for the new academy. In November of that same year a board of trustees was formed and Dusenberry was elected as the first principal of Brigham Young Academy. Dusenberry would only act as principal of the academy for a few months before resigning and to go to law school.

In 1892 Dusenberry was elected mayor of Provo, defeating Reed Smoot.

== Religious affiliations ==
Eventually, both of the Dusenberry brothers decided to be baptized into the Church of Jesus Christ of Latter-day Saints, despite counsel from their father to keep "free from the curse of Mormonism". They were baptized on July 25, 1864 and were confirmed the next day. By 1867, both Warren and Wilson were ordained as members of the Quorum of the Seventy. On April 7, 1867, Dusenberry went on a mission to the Southern States. He served for one year as a proselyting missionary and then was reassigned to help in the immigration office in Boston where he helped LDS church members prepare to move west. he died in 1915 at 78

Academic offices
New institution	Principal of Brigham Young Academy (later becoming Brigham Young University); December 1875 to April 1876	Succeeded by Karl G. Maeser
