= List of Latter Day Saints =

This is a list of people who identify, (or have identified if dead), as Latter Day Saints, and who have attained levels of notability. This list includes adherents of all Latter Day Saint movement denominations, including the Church of Jesus Christ of Latter-day Saints (LDS Church), Community of Christ, and others. LDS Church members are usually considered either:

- "Active", meaning they attend church on a regular basis and are committed to living their religion,
- "Less-active" meaning they attend church on an occasional basis and may or may not be committed to living their religion or
- "Inactive", meaning they do not attend church regularly and/or they do not adhere to its principles.

See List of former Latter Day Saints for those persons who ended their affiliation with the Latter Day Saint movement.

== Artists ==
- Paige Crosland Anderson, abstract painter, known for her geometric paintings that invoke pioneer quilts and Mormon culture, born about 1989
- Truman O. Angell, architect and designer of the Salt Lake Temple, 1810-1887
- Wulf Barsch, artist and art professor at BYU, born 1943, in Germany
- Earl W. Bascom, cowboy artist and sculptor, 1906-1995
- Milo Baughman, modern furniture designer, 1923-2003
- Johan Benthin, painter and sculptor, first stake president of Copenhagen Denmark Stake in 1974, 1936-2006
- Mark Buehner, illustrator of children's books, born in 1959
- Blair Buswell, artist and sculptor for Pro Football Hall of Fame and Georgia Golf Hall of Fame Botanical Gardens, born 1956
- C. C. A. Christensen, pioneer artist, painting best known for: Mormon Panorama, 1831-1912
- James C. Christensen, illustrator and painter of religious and fantasy art and former BYU professor, 1942-2017
- John Willard Clawson, artist and painter, 1858-1936
- Rose Datoc Dall, Filipina-American painter, known for her contemporary figurative paintings and her religious works, born 1968
- Gregg Deal, American Pyramid Lake Paiute Tribe, known for performance art, mural work, painting, filmmaking and spoken word, born 1975
- Søren Edsberg, painter, adjunct professor at BYU, 1945-2021
- Edwin Evans, landscape painter and professor at the University of Utah, in 1890, 1 of 5 artists who studied in Paris under the sponsorship of the LDS Church in preparation for painting murals at the nearly completed Salt Lake Temple, 1860-1946
- Avard Fairbanks, artist and sculptor, sculpted over 100 public monuments and hundreds of Artworks, 1897-1987
- John B. Fairbanks, landscape painter and muralist, in 1890, 1 of 5 artists who studied in Paris under the sponsorship of the LDS Church in preparation for painting murals at the nearly completed Salt Lake Temple, 1855-1940
- Ortho R. Fairbanks, renowned artist and sculptor, missionary and professor at the Church College of Hawaii (now BYU-Hawai'i) and Northland Pioneer College, creating works of art all over the world, 1925-2015
- Dean Fausett, portrait painter, of many notable figures including U.S. presidents, a duke and duchess of Windsor, LDS Church President Ezra Taft Benson, and many others, 1913-1998
- Lynn Fausett, mural painter, in 1938, was in Who's Who in New York, and he later was included in the Who's Who in America in 1940, best known for a mural: The First Meeting of the Primary Association depicting the establishment of the Primary Association in the Farmington Rock Chapel, 1894-1977
- Arnold Friberg, illustrator and painter, known for his religious and patriotic works, one of his most famous pieces is the 1975 painting The Prayer at Valley Forge, 1913-2010
- Erasmo Fuentes, Mexican-born artist, professional sculptor and musician, one of his more well known works is a sculpture "Anxiously Engaged" at the Missionary Training Center in Provo, Utah, born 1943
- Alvin Gittins, artist of realistic portraits of people (including most popular image of the Church Founder, Joseph Smith) and professor at University of Utah, 1922-1981
- John Hafen, muralist and professor at BYU, in 1890, 1 of 5 artists who studied in Paris under the sponsorship of the LDS Church in preparation for painting murals at the nearly completed Salt Lake Temple, 1856-1910
- Ben Hammond, sculptor and painter for his work in the Pro Football Hall of Fame and United States Capitol, born 1977
- Rei Hamon, CBE, landscape artist, one of the foremost artists of New Zealand, 1919-2008
- Brett Helquist, illustrator (and occasional writer) of over 50 children's books, best known for his illustrations in 13 A Series of Unfortunate Events children's books
- Tom Holdman, glass artist, his work is featured in the Palmyra New York, Manhattan New York, Paris France, and Laie Hawai'i Temples and the Rome Italy Temple Visitors' Center, born 1970
- Franz M. Johansen, sculptor, emeritus professor at BYU, 1928-2018
- Brian Kershisnik, painter, has described his own style as "Mythological Autobiography," or a kind of "Emotional Self-Portrait, born 1962
- Torleif S. Knaphus, artist and sculptor, best known for: 1, Salt Lake Temple Ground's Handcart Pioneers Monument, 2, Hill Cumorah Monument, artwork and sculptures at these 6 early (outside Utah) Temples: Laie Hawai'i Temple, Cardston Alberta Temple, Mesa Arizona Temple, Idaho Falls Idaho Temple, Los Angeles California Temple and Oakland California Temple, 1881-1965
- Giovanna Lacerti, artist, born 1935, in Italy
- Alfred Lambourne, artist, painter, author and poet, 1850-1926
- Howard Lyon, fantasy artist, best known for artwork in role-playing games like Dungeons & Dragons, and collectible card games like Magic: the Gathering, born 1973
- Margaret Morrison, fine art painter and professor at the University of Georgia, born 1960
- George M. Ottinger, artist, educator, actor, public official and photographer, 1833-1917
- Del Parson, painter, gallery and portrait artist, then professor of art at Dixie College (now Utah Tech University), best painting known for: Christ in a Red Robe (1983), but the LDS Church has commissioned him to paint over 240 works; born in 1948
- Lorus Pratt, landscape painter, missionary (with his father, Orson Pratt) and English professor at the University of Utah, in 1890, 1 of 5 artists who studied in Paris under the sponsorship of the LDS Church in preparation for painting murals at the nearly completed Salt Lake Temple, 1855-1923
- Walter Rane, painter and illustrator, best known for: painting of the empty tomb titled He is Not Here, born 1949
- J. Kirk Richards, fine arts painter, who specializes in Judeo-Christian themes, born 1976
- Lee Greene Richards, artist (portraiture and murals), best known for his portraiture, many of his works can be found at the City and County Building in Salt Lake City, Utah, 1878-1950
- Ed "Big Daddy" Roth, artist, car customizer, creator of Rat Fink character, 1932-2001
- Jorge Cocco Santángelo, artist, sacrocubism painter and educator, born in 1936 in Argentina
- Charles Roscoe Savage, photographer and art bazaar (gallery) owner, best known for: photographing the linking of the Union Pacific and Central Pacific Railroads on Promontory Summit, at Promontory, Utah in 1869, 1832-1909
- Dennis Smith, sculptor, best known for: having created most of the statues that form the Monument to Women Memorial Garden in Nauvoo, Illinois, born 1942
- LeConte Stewart, artist, primarily known for his landscapes of rural Utah, former University of Utah Head of Art Department, 1891-1990
- Liz Lemon Swindle, painter and artist known for her religious paintings, especially paintings of Jesus Christ, born in 1953
- Minerva Teichert, painter, best known for: Christ in a Red Robe (1945), Queen Esther, and Rescue of the Lost Lamb, 1888-1976
- Joseph Vorst, artist, worked in many mediums — painting, drawing, watercolors, murals, mural studies, artists books, linoleum cuts, sketch books, photography, sculpture, etchings and lithography, and art director at Jefferson College, 1897-1947
- Kevin Wasden, artist, illustrator and comics artist, born 197?
- Dan Weggeland, artist and teacher, sometimes referred to as the "Father of Utah Art", 1827-1918
- Janis Mars Wunderlich, ceramic artist
- Mahonri Young, sculptor

== Sports figures ==
=== American football and Canadian football ===
- Zayne Anderson, defensive back, 2021-present, Kansas City Chiefs and Green Bay Packers
- Ezekiel Ansah, (defensive lineman) defensive end, 2013-2020, Detroit Lions, Seattle Seahawks and San Francisco 49ers
- Ben Archibald, offensive tackle, 2005-2005, New Orleans Saints
- Isaac Asiata, offensive guard, 2017-2018, Miami Dolphins
- Matt Asiata, full back, 2012-2016, Minnesota Vikings
- Mark Asper, offensive lineman (guard), 2012-2013, Jacksonville Jaguars and Buffalo Bills
- Brandon Bair, defensive lineman (defensive end), 2014-2015, Philadelphia Eagles
- Tyler Batty, linebacker, 2025-present, Minnesota Vikings
- John Beck, quarterback, 2007-2011, Miami Dolphins and Washington Redskins
- Tony Bergstrom, offensive lineman/receiver (offensive tackle, right guard and tight end), 2012-2020, Oakland Raiders, Houston Texans, Baltimore Ravens, Washington Redskins and San Francisco 49ers
- Darrell Bevell, coach (offensive assistant, offensive coordinator and quarterbacks/passing game coordinator), 2000-present, Green Bay Packers, Minnesota Vikings, Seattle Seahawks, Detroit Lions, Jacksonville Jaguars and Miami Dolphins
- Vince Biegel, linebacker, 2017-2021, Green Bay Packers, New Orleans Saints and Miami Dolphins
- Garett Bolles, offensive left tackle, 2017-present, Denver Broncos
- Stewart Bradley, linebacker, 2007-2012, Philadelphia Eagles and Arizona Cardinals
- Jason Buck, defensive lineman (defensive end and defensive tackle), 1987-1993, Cincinnati Bengals and Washington Redskins
- Matt Bushman, offensive lineman (tight end), 2021-2023, Las Vegas Raiders and Kansas City Chiefs
- Ben Cahoon, slotback, Canadian Football League, 1998-2010, Les Alouettes de Montréal
- Jordan Cameron, offensive lineman/receiver (tight end), 2011-2016, Cleveland Browns and Miami Dolphins
- Drue Chrisman, punter, 2022-2022, Cincinnati Bengals
- Brady Christensen, offensive lineman (guard), 2021-present, Carolina Panthers
- Todd Christensen, tight end and running back, 1979-1988, New York Giants, Oakland Raiders and Los Angeles Raiders
- Austin Collie, wide receiver, 2009-2013, Indianapolis Colts and New England Patriots
- Austin Corbett, offensive lineman (center and guard), 2018-present, Cleveland Browns, Los Angeles Rams and Carolina Panthers
- Britain Covey, wide receiver and return specialist, 2022-present, Philadelphia Eagles
- Gary Crowton, coach (offensive coordinator), 1999-2000, Chicago Bears
- Jaxson Dart, quarterback for the New York Giants
- John Denney, offensive lineman (Long Snapper), 2005-2018, Miami Dolphins
- Ty Detmer, quarterback, 1993-2003, Green Bay Packers, Philadelphia Eagles. San Francisco 49ers, Cleveland Browns and Detroit Lions
- Jordan Devey, offensive lineman (offensive tackle and right guard), 2014-2020, New England Patriots, San Francisco 49ers, Kansas City Chiefs, Oakland Raiders and Buffalo Bills
- LaVell Edwards, head coach, Brigham Young University
- Mohammed Elewonibi, tackle, 1992-1995, Washington Redskins and Philadelphia Eagles
- Kyler Fackrell, linebacker and outside linebacker, 2016-2021, Green Bay Packers, New York Giants and Los Angeles Chargers
- Lloyd Fairbanks, offensive lineman (guard and tackle), Canadian Football League, 1975-1991, Calgary Stampeders, Montréal Concordes, Les Alouettes de Montréal and Hamilton Tiger-Cats
- Hebron Fangupo, defensive lineman (defensive tackle and nose tackle), 2012-2013, Seattle Seahawks and Pittsburgh Steelers
- Breiden Fehoko, defensive lineman (defensive tackle and nose tackle), 2020-present, Los Angeles Chargers and Pittsburgh Steelers
- Simi Fehoko, wide receiver, 2021-present, Dallas Cowboys, Los Angeles Chargers, and Arizona Cardinals
- Dick Felt, defensive back, cornerback and free safety, 1960-1966, Titans of New York and Boston Patriots
- Porter Gustin, defensive lineman (defensive end), 2019-2021, Cleveland Browns
- Sione Fua, defensive lineman (defensive tackle, right defensive tackle and nose tackle), 2011-2014, Carolina Panthers, Denver Broncos and Cleveland Browns
- Matt Gay, placekicker, 2019-present, Tampa Bay Buccaneers, Indianapolis Colts, Los Angeles Rams, Washington Commanders, San Francisco 49ers and Las Vegas Raiders
- Alohi Gilman, safety, 2020-present, Los Angeles Chargers, Baltimore Ravens and Kansas City Chiefs
- Max Hall, quarterback, 2010-2010, Arizona Cardinals
- Stanley Havili, offensive running back (full back), 2012-2013, Philadelphia Eagles and Indianapolis Colts
- Todd Heap, tight end, 2001-2012, Baltimore Ravens and Arizona Cardinals
- Jake Heaps, quarterback (practice squad only), 2015-2017, New York Jets and Seattle Seahawks; Also, Canadian Football League, quarterback (practice squad only), 2017-2017, Saskatchewan Roughriders and BC Lions
- Taysom Hill, quarterback, wide receiver and tight end, 2017-present, New Orleans Saints
- Chris Hoke, defensive lineman (nose tackle and defensive tackle), 2004-2011, Pittsburgh Steelers
- Dallin Holker, tight end, 2024-present, New Orleans Saints
- Doug Jolley, tight end, 2002-2006, Oakland Raiders, New York Jets and Tampa Bay Buccaneers
- Gordon Jolley, offensive lineman (guard and tackle), 1972-1977, Detroit Lions and Seattle Seahawks
- Bryan Kehl, defensive linebacker (middle linebacker), 2008-2013, New York Giants, St. Louis Rams, Washington Redskins and Kansas City Chiefs
- Brett Keisel, defensive end, 2002-2014, Pittsburgh Steelers
- Paul Kruger, defensive end, 2009-2016, Baltimore Ravens, Cleveland Browns and New Orleans Saints
- Glen Kozlowski, offensive receiver (wide receiver), 1987-1992 Chicago Bears
- Spencer Larsen, defensive back field and offensive back field 2-way player (linebacker and full back), 2008-2013, Denver Broncos, New England Patriots (but only on injured reserves) and Tampa Bay Buccaneers
- Tyler Larsen, offensive lineman (Center), 2016-present, Carolina Panthers, Washington Football Team and Washington Commanders
- Mike Leach, head coach, Mississippi State Bulldogs football
- Chad Lewis, tight end, 1997-2005, Philadelphia Eagles and St. Louis Rams
- John Lotulelei, linebacker (outside linebacker), 2013-2015, Seattle Seahawks and Jacksonville Jaguars
- Star Lotulelei, defensive lineman (right defensive tackle and left defensive tackle), 2013-2021, Carolina Panthers and Buffalo Bills
- Deuce Lutui, offensive lineman (guard), 2006-2012, Arizona Cardinals and Tennessee Titans
- Reno Mahe, running back, 2003-2007, Philadelphia Eagles
- Brandon Manumaleuna, tight end, 2001-2010, St. Louis Rams, San Diego Chargers and Chicago Bears
- Tanner McKee, quarterback, 2023-present, Philadelphia Eagles
- Bronco Mendenhall, head coach, University of Virginia Cavaliers
- Mat Mendenhall, defensive lineman (left defensive end and right defensive end), 1981-1982, Washington Redskins
- Itula Mili, tight end, 1998-2006, Seattle Seahawks
- Fili Moala, defensive lineman (defensive tackle, left defensive tackle and right defensive end), 2009-2013, Indianapolis Colts
- Tony Moeaki, offensive line/receiver (tight end), 2010-2015, Kansas City Chiefs, Buffalo Bills, Seattle Seahawks and Atlanta Falcons
- Kellen Moore, quarterback, 2012-2017, Detroit Lions and Dallas Cowboys, then QB Coach in 2018 and Offensive Coordinator from 2017-2022 for the Dallas Cowboys, continued as an Offensive Coordinator for the Los Angeles Chargers in 2023 and the Philadelphia Eagles in 2024, after that he became the Head Coach of the New Orleans Saints 2025-present.
- Rob Morris, linebacker (middle and left linebacker too), 2000-2007, Indianapolis Colts
- Edwin Mulitalo, offensive lineman (guard), 1999-2008, Baltimore Ravens and Detroit Lions
- Puka Nacua, wide receiver, 2023-present, Los Angeles Rams
- Haloti Ngata, defensive lineman (left defensive end, right defensive tackle, nose tackle), 2006-2018, Baltimore Ravens, Detroit Lions and Philadelphia Eagles
- Ken Niumatalolo, head coach, U.S. Naval Academy
- Bart Oates, offensive lineman (center), 1985-1995, USFL's Philadelphia / Baltimore Stars, then NFL's New York Giants and San Francisco 49ers
- Merlin Olsen, Hall of Fame, defensive lineman (left defensive tackle and right defensive tackle), 1962-1976, Los Angeles Rams
- Orrin Olsen, offensive lineman (center), 1976-1976, Kansas City Chiefs
- Phil Olsen, defensive and offensive lineman (right defensive tackle, defensive tackle, defensive end and center), Los Angeles Rams and Denver Broncos
- Jeff Perrett, offensive tackle, Les Alouettes de Montréal and Toronto Argonauts
- Dennis Pitta, tight end, 2010-2016, Baltimore Ravens
- Brady Poppinga, linebacker (left linebacker and outside linebacker), 2005-2012, Green Bay Packers, St. Louis Rams and Dallas Cowboys
- Sione Po'uha, defensive lineman (defensive tackle and nose tackle), 2005-2012 New York Jets
- Brett Ralph, wide receiver/slotback, Calgary Stampeders
- Brock Ralph, wide receiver/slotback, Edmonton Eskimos, Hamilton Tiger-Cats and Winnipeg Blue Bombers
- Jimmy Ralph, wide receiver, Toronto Argonauts and Edmonton Elks
- Austin Rehkow, punter, 2017-2021, Buffalo Bills, New York Giants, AAF's Salt Lake Stallions, XFL's Houston Roughnecks and the Indianapolis Colts (offseason and/or practice squad member only with his NFL teams)
- Ryan Rehkow, punter, 2024-present, Cincinnati Bengals
- Andy Reid, head coach, 1999-present, Philadelphia Eagles and Kansas City Chiefs
- Karene Reid, linebacker, 2025-present, Denver Broncos
- Isaac Rex, offensive lineman/receiver (tight end), 2024-present, Detroit Lions and Los Angeles Chargers (for both teams, practice squad or pre-season only)
- Brett Salisbury, quarterback BYU Cougars, Palomar College Comets, Oregon Ducks and Wayne State Wildcats
- Sean Salisbury, quarterback, 1987-1996, Indianapolis Colts, Minnesota Vikings and San Diego Chargers
- Samson Satele, offensive lineman (center), 2007-2014, Miami Dolphins, Oakland Raiders and Indianapolis Colts
- Nephi Sewell, linebacker, 2022-2024 New Orleans Saints, in 2025 he was on the practice squad only. In 2026 he signed with the Chicago Bears to be on the pre-season or practice squad.
- Noah Sewell, linebacker, 2023-present, Chicago Bears
- Penei Sewell, offensive lineman (tackle), 2021-present, Detroit Lions
- Vai Sikahema, running back and kick returner, 1986-1993, St. Louis Cardinals, Phoenix Cardinals, Green Bay Packers and Philadelphia Eagles
- Kalani Sitake, full back, sustained a career ending back injury in the 2001 pre-season with the Cincinnati Bengals, then began college coaching career
- Vic So'oto, defensive linebacker (Linebacker), 2011-2013, Green Bay Packers, Oakland Raiders and Arizona Cardinals
- Brad Sorensen, offensive backfield (quarterback), 2013-2015, San Diego Chargers was on the active roster as 3rd QB, but never played a single down in the NFL, was also on the practice squads for the Tennessee Titans and Minnesota Vikings
- Daniel Sorensen, defensive backfield (defensive back, free safety, strong safety and safety), 2014-present, Kansas City Chiefs and New Orleans Saints
- Luke Staley, running back (practice squad only), 2002-2003, Detroit Lions
- Dale Stevenson, fullback, Edmonton Eskimos and Winnipeg Blue Bombers
- Xavier Suʻa-Filo, offensive lineman (guard and left guard), 2014-2021, Houston Texans, Tennessee Titans, Dallas Cowboys and Cincinnati Bengals
- Kingsley Suamataia, offensive lineman (guard and tackle), 2024-present, Kansas City Chiefs
- Naufahu Tahi, offensive backfield (running back and full back) and kick returner, 2007-2010, Minnesota Vikings
- John Tait, offensive lineman (left tackle, right tackle and tackle), 1999-2008, Kansas City Chiefs and Chicago Bears
- Manti Te'o, defensive linebacker (linebacker, left inside linebacker and middle linebacker), 2013-2020, San Diego Chargers, New Orleans Saints and Chicago Bears
- Sam Tevi, offensive lineman (right tackle, tackle, left tackle), 2017-2020, Los Angeles Chargers
- Khyiris Tonga, defensive lineman (defensive tackle and nose tackle), 2021-present, Chicago Bears, Minnesota Vikings, Arizona Cardinals, and New England Patriots
- Max Tooley, defensive backfield (linebacker), 2024-present, Houston Texans and Minnesota Vikings (for both teams, practice squad only)
- Spencer Toone, linebacker, 2006-2006, Tennessee Titans
- Kyle Turley, offensive lineman (right tackle, left guard and left tackle), 1998-2007, New Orleans Saints, St. Louis Rams and Kansas City Chiefs
- Harvey Unga, offensive backfield (running back) was on the active roster at various times between 2010-2013, but doesn't appear to have played a single down for the Chicago Bears was also on the practice squad for the 2014 Carolina Panthers
- Sione Vaki, offensive backfield, (running back), 2024-present, Detroit Lions
- Kyle Van Noy, linebacker (right linebacker, left linebacker, middle linebacker, left inside linebacker, outside linebacker, right outside linebacker and right inside linebacker), 2014-present, Detroit Lions, New England Patriots, Miami Dolphins, Los Angeles Chargers and Baltimore Ravens
- Devaughn Vele, wide receiver, 2024-present, Denver Broncos and New Orleans Saints
- Fred Warner, linebacker (middle linebacker and outside linebacker), 2018-present, San Francisco 49ers
- Eric Weddle, defensive backfield (free safety, defensive back and strong safety), 2007-2021, San Diego Chargers, Baltimore Ravens and Los Angeles Rams
- Danny White, quarterback and punter, 1976-1988, Dallas Cowboys
- Kyle Whittingham, linebacker, 1983-1987, USFL's Denver Gold and New Orleans Breakers, then NFL's Los Angeles Rams
- Zach Wilson, quarterback, 2021-present, New York Jets, Denver Broncos, and Miami Dolphins
- Steve Young, Hall of Fame, quarterback, 1984-1999, USFL's Los Angeles Express, then NFL's Tampa Bay Buccaneers and San Francisco 49ers

=== Association football (soccer) ===
- Bruna Benites, Olympic defender, 2012 and 2016, Brazil
- Erroll Bennett, Tahiti
- Aleisha Cramer, USA
- Guillermo Franco, Argentina
- Zavier Gozo, MLS, United States
- Ashley Hatch, NWSL, United States
- Natasha Kai, Olympic forward, gold medal winner, 2008, Team USA, professionally, Sky Blue FC, Philadelphia Independence, LA Galaxy OC, 2009-2019, see also in Martial Arts and Rugby
- Sherjill MacDonald, Netherlands
- Jimmy Montanero, Ecuador
- Freddy Rincón, Colombia, Real Madrid
- Shauna Rohbock, forward, WUSA, 2002-2003, San Diego Spirit; see also Olympic Bobsleighing/Bobsleding
- Jon Russell, England
- Tita, Brazil
- Michele Vasconcelos, NWSL, United States
- Daniel Woolard, MLS, United States

=== Baseball ===
- Spencer Adams, infielder, 1923-1927, Pittsburgh Pirates, Washington Nationals/Senators, New York Yankees and St. Louis Browns
- Danny Ainge, infielder-outfielder, 1979-1981, Toronto Blue Jays
- Rick Aguilera, pitcher, 1985-2000, Minnesota Twins, New York Mets, Boston Red Sox and Chicago Cubs
- Cody Anderson, pitcher, 2015-2019, Cleveland Indians
- Alan Ashby, catcher, 1973-1989, Cleveland Indians, Toronto Blue Jays and Houston Astros
- Brian Banks, 1st baseman-leftfielder, 1996-2003, Milwaukee Brewers and Florida Marlins
- Tanner Banks, pitcher, 2022-present, Chicago White Sox and Philadelphia Phillies
- Joe Barlow, pitcher, 2021-present, Texas Rangers
- Darwin Barney, infielder, 2010-2017, Chicago Cubs, Los Angeles Dodgers and Toronto Blue Jays
- Tom Barrett, pinch Hitter-2nd baseman, 1988-1992, Philadelphia Phillies and Boston Red Sox
- Barry Bonnell, outfielder, 1977-1986, Atlanta Braves, Toronto Blue Jays and Seattle Mariners
- Ron Brand, catcher, 1963-1971, Pittsburgh Pirates, Houston Astros and Montreal Expos
- Jaycob Brugman, centerfielder, 2017-2017, Oakland Athletics
- Tyson Brummett, pitcher, 2012-2012, Philadelphia Phillies
- John Buck, catcher, 2004-2014, Kansas City Royals, Toronto Blue Jays, Florida Marlins, Miami Marlins, New York Mets, Pittsburgh Pirates, Seattle Mariners and Los Angeles Angeles of Anaheim
- Roy Castleton, pitcher, 1907-1910, New York Highlanders and Cincinnati Reds, first LDS player and pitcher in the Major Leagues (American and National Leagues)
- Troy Cate, pitcher, 2007-2007, St. Louis Cardinals
- McKay Christensen, centerfielder, 1999-2002, Chicago White Sox, Los Angeles Dodgers and New York Mets
- Taylor Cole, pitcher, 2017-2019, Toronto Blue Jays and Los Angeles Angels
- Gary Cooper, 3rd baseman, 1991-1991, Houston Astros
- Bobby Crosby, shortstop, 2003-2010, Oakland Athletics, Pittsburgh Pirates and Arizona Diamondbacks
- Bubba Crosby, outfielder, 2003-2006, Los Angeles Dodgers and New York Yankees
- Ken Dayley, pitcher, 1982-1993, Atlanta Braves, St. Louis Cardinals and Toronto Blue Jays
- Jeff Dedmon, pitcher, 1983-1988, Atlanta Braves and Cleveland Indians
- John DeSilva, pitcher, 1993-1995, Detroit Tigers, Los Angeles Dodgers and Baltimore Orioles
- Dave Downs, pitcher, 1972-1972, Philadelphia Phillies
- Kelly Downs, pitcher, 1986-1993, San Francisco Giants and Oakland Athletics
- Brandon Duckworth, pitcher, 2001-2008, Philadelphia Phillies, Houston Astros and Kansas City Royals
- Dennis Eckersley, Hall of Fame pitcher, 1975-1998, Cleveland Indians, Boston Red Sox, Chicago Cubs, Oakland Athletics and St. Louis Cardinals
- Jacoby Ellsbury, outfielder, 2007-2017, Boston Red Sox and New York Yankees
- Shawn Estes, pitcher, 1995-2008, San Francisco Giants, New York Mets, Cincinnati Reds, Chicago Cubs, Colorado Rockies, Arizona Diamondbacks and San Diego Padres
- Scott Eyre, pitcher, 1997-2009, Chicago White Sox, Toronto Blue Jays, San Francisco Giants, Chicago Cubs and Philadelphia Phillies
- Willie Eyre, pitcher, 2006-2011, Minnesota Twins, Texas Rangers and Baltimore Orioles
- Kyle Farnsworth, pitcher, 1999-2014, Chicago Cubs, Detroit Tigers, Atlanta Braves, New York Yankees, Kansas City Royals, Tampa Bay Rays, Pittsburgh Pirates, New York Mets and Houston Astros
- Jared Fernández, pitcher, 2001-2006, Cincinnati Reds, Houston Astros and Milwaukee Brewers
- Mike Fetters, pitcher, 1989-2004, California Angels, Milwaukee Brewers, Oakland Athletics, Anaheim Angels, Baltimore Orioles, Los Angeles Dodgers, Pittsburgh Pirates, Arizona Diamondbacks and Minnesota Twins
- Doug Fister, pitcher, 2009-2018, Seattle Mariners, Detroit Tigers, Washington Nationals, Houston Astros, Boston Red Sox and Texas Rangers
- Jerry Garvin, pitcher, 1977-1982, Toronto Blue Jays
- Luis Gómez, shortstop, 1974-1981, Minnesota Twins, Toronto Blue Jays and Atlanta Braves
- Jim Gott, pitcher, 1982-1995, Toronto Blue Jays, San Francisco Giants, Pittsburgh Pirates and Los Angeles Dodgers
- Jeremy Guthrie, pitcher, 2004-2017, Cleveland Indians, Baltimore Orioles, Colorado Rockies, Kansas City Royals and Washington Nationals
- Roy Halladay, pitcher, 1998-2013, Toronto Blue Jays and Philadelphia Phillies
- Ryan Hancock, pitcher, 1996-1996, California Angels
- Jacob Hannemann, centerfielder, 2017-2017, Seattle Mariners
- Doug Hansen, pinch runner, 1951-1951, Cleveland Indians
- Bryce Harper, outfielder, 2012-present, Washington Nationals and Philadelphia Phillies
- Payton Henry, catcher, 2021-present, Miami Marlins
- Chad Hermansen, outfielder, 1999-2004, Pittsburgh Pirates, Chicago Cubs, Los Angeles Dodgers and Toronto Blue Jays
- Lloyd Hittle, pitcher, 1949-1950, Washington Nationals/Senators
- Doug Howard, 1st baseman-outfielder, 1972-1976, California Angels, St. Louis Cardinals and Cleveland Indians
- Ken Hubbs, 2nd baseman, 1961-1963, Chicago Cubs
- Ken R. Hunt, pitcher, 1961-1961, Cincinnati Reds
- Bruce Hurst, pitcher, 1980-1994, Boston Red Sox, San Diego Padres, Colorado Rockies and Texas Rangers
- Dane Iorg, outfielder, 1977-1986, Philadelphia Phillies, St. Louis Cardinals, Kansas City Royals and San Diego Padres
- Garth Iorg, infielder, 1978-1987, Toronto Blue Jays
- Ray Jacobs, pinch hitter, 1928-1928, Chicago Cubs
- Ryan Jensen, pitcher, 2001-2005, San Francisco Giants and Kansas City Royals
- Elliot Johnson, utility player (SS-2B-OF), 2008-2014, Tampa Bay Rays, Kansas City Royals, Atlanta Braves and Cleveland Indians
- Gary Johnson, outfielder-pinch hitter, 2003-2003, Anaheim Angels
- Jason Johnson, pitcher, 1997-2008, Pittsburgh Pirates, Tampa Bay Devil Rays, Baltimore Orioles, Detroit Tigers, Cleveland Indians, Boston Red Sox, Cincinnati Reds and Los Angeles Dodgers
- Josh Johnson, pitcher, 2005-2013, Florida Marlins, Miami Marlins and Toronto Blue Jays
- Mitch Jones, pinch hitter-rightfielder, 2009-2009, Los Angeles Dodgers
- Wally Joyner, 1st baseman, 1986-2001, California Angels, Kansas City Royals, San Diego Padres, Atlanta Braves and Anaheim Angels
- Bob Kaiser, pitcher, 1971-1971, Cleveland Indians
- Jeff Kent, Hall of Fame 2nd baseman, 1992-2008, Toronto Blue Jays, New York Mets, Cleveland Indians, San Francisco Giants, Houston Astros and Los Angeles Dodgers
- Harmon Killebrew, Hall of Fame 1st baseman, 1954-1975, Washington Nationals/Senators, Minnesota Twins and Kansas City Royals
- Newt Kimball, pitcher, 1937-1943, Chicago Cubs, Brooklyn Dodgers, St. Louis Cardinals and Philadelphia Phillies
- Don Kirkwood, pitcher, 1974-1978, California Angels, Chicago White Sox and Toronto Blue Jays
- Ray Knight, 3rd baseman-1st baseman, 1974-1988, Cincinnati Reds, Houston Astros, New York Mets, Baltimore Orioles and Detroit Tigers
- Gary Kroll, pitcher, 1964-1969, Philadelphia Phillies, New York Mets, Houston Astros and Cleveland Indians
- Vance Law, infielder, 1980-1991, Pittsburgh Pirates, Chicago White Sox, Montreal Expos, Chicago Cubs and Oakland Athletics
- Vernon Law, pitcher, 1950-1967, Pittsburgh Pirates
- Matt Lindstrom, pitcher, 2007-2014, Florida Marlins, Houston Astros, Colorado Rockies, Baltimore Orioles, Arizona Diamondbacks and Chicago White Sox
- Brandon Lyon, pitcher, 2001-2013, Toronto Blue Jays, Boston Red Sox, Arizona Diamondbacks, Detroit Tigers, Houston Astros and New York Mets
- Mitch Maier, outfielder, 2006-2012, Kansas City Royals
- Merrill "Pinky" May, 3rd baseman, 1939-1943, Philadelphia Phillies
- Milt May, catcher, 1970-1984, Pittsburgh Pirates, Houston Astros, Detroit Tigers, Chicago White Sox and San Francisco Giants
- Jack Morris, Hall of Fame pitcher, 1977-1994, Detroit Tigers, Minnesota Twins, Toronto Blue Jays and Cleveland Indians
- Clayton Mortensen, pitcher, 2009-2013, St. Louis Cardinals, Oakland Athletics, Colorado Rockies and Boston Red Sox
- Dale Murphy, outfielder, 1976-1993, Atlanta Braves, Philadelphia Phillies and Colorado Rockies
- Scott Nielsen, pitcher, 1986-1989, New York Yankees and Chicago White Sox
- John Noriega, pitcher, 1969-1970, Cincinnati Reds
- Jerry Nyman, pitcher, 1968-1970, Chicago White Sox and San Diego Padres
- Ed Olivares, pinch hitter-outfielder-3rd baseman, 1960-1961, St. Louis Cardinals
- Omar Olivares, pitcher, 1990-2001, St. Louis Cardinals, Colorado Rockies, Philadelphia Phillies, Detroit Tigers, Seattle Mariners, Anaheim Angels, Oakland Athletics and Pittsburgh Pirates
- Cliff Pastornicky, 3rd baseman, 1983-1983, Kansas City Royals
- Tyler Pastornicky, pinch hitter-2nd baseman-3rd baseman, 2012-2014, Atlanta Braves
- Monte Pearson, pitcher, 1932-1941, Cleveland Indians, New York Yankees and Cincinnati Reds
- Red Peery, pitcher, 1927-1929, Pittsburgh Pirates and Boston Braves
- Lance Pendleton, pitcher, 2011-2011, New York Yankees and Houston Astros
- Santiago Pérez, shortstop-outfielder, 2000-2001, Milwaukee Brewers and San Diego Padres
- Adam Peterson, pitcher, 1987-1991, Chicago White Sox and San Diego Padres
- Kent Peterson, pitcher, 1944-1953, Cincinnati Reds and Philadelphia Phillies
- Shane Peterson, outfielder and pinch-hitter, 2013-2017, Oakland Athletics, Milwaukee Brewers and Tampa Bay Rays
- Brett Pill, 1st baseman-leftfielder, 2011-2013, San Francisco Giants
- Tyler Pill, pitcher, 2017-2017, New York Mets
- Cooper Pratt, shortstop, 2026-now, Milwaukee Brewers
- Wally Ritchie, pitcher, 1987-1992, Philadelphia Phillies
- Adam Rosales, infielder, 2008-2018, Cincinnati Reds, Oakland Athletics, Texas Rangers, San Diego Padres, Arizona Diamondbacks and Cleveland Indians
- Michael Rucker, pitcher, 2021-present, Chicago Cubs and Seattle Mariners
- Fred Sanford, pitcher, 1943-1951, St. Louis Browns, New York Yankees, and Washington Nationals/Senators
- Daniel Schneemann, utility infielder, 2024-present, Cleveland Guardians
- Chris Shelton, 1st baseman, 2004-2009, Detroit Tigers, Texas Rangers and Seattle Mariners
- Elmer Singleton, pitcher, 1945-1959, Boston Braves, Pittsburgh Pirates, Washington Nationals/Senators and Chicago Cubs
- Tommie Sisk, pitcher, 1962-1970, Pittsburgh Pirates, San Diego Padres and Chicago White Sox
- Dick Smith, outfielder-1st baseman, 1963-1965, New York Mets and Los Angeles Dodgers
- Cory Snyder, infielder-outfielder, 1986-1994, Cleveland Indians, Chicago White Sox, Toronto Blue Jays, San Francisco Giants and Los Angeles Dodgers
- Eric Sogard, infielder, 2010-2021, Oakland Athletics, Milwaukee Brewers, Toronto Blue Jays, Tampa Bay Rays and Chicago Cubs
- Zach Sorensen, pinch runner-2nd baseman, 2003-2005, Cleveland Indians and Anaheim Angels
- Garrett Stephenson, pitcher, 1996-2003, Baltimore Orioles, Philadelphia Phillies and St. Louis Cardinals
- Justin Sterner, pitcher, 2024-present, Tampa Bay Rays and Athletics
- Mitch Talbot, pitcher, 2008-2011, Tampa Bay Rays and Cleveland Indians
- Steve Taylor, first-round pick by the New York Yankees in the 1977 MLB draft.
- Brad Thompson, pitcher, 2005-2010, St. Louis Cardinals and Kansas City Royals
- Carlos Torres, pitcher, 2009-2019, Chicago White Sox, Colorado Rockies, New York Mets, Milwaukee Brewers, Washington Nationals and Detroit Tigers
- Nik Turley, pitcher, 2017-2020, Minnesota Twins and Pittsburgh Pirates
- Bob Usher, outfielder, 1946-1957, Cincinnati Reds, Chicago Cubs, Cleveland Indians and Washington Nationals/Senators
- Jay Van Noy, pinch hitter-outfielder, 1951-1951, St. Louis Cardinals
- Dave Veres, pitcher, 1994-2003, Houston Astros, Montreal Expos, Colorado Rockies, St. Louis Cardinals and Chicago Cubs
- Colby Ward, pitcher, 1990-1990, Cleveland Indians
- Jim Wessinger, 2nd baseman, 1979-1979, Atlanta Braves
- Nick Willhite, pitcher, 1963-1967, Los Angeles Dodgers, Washington Senators, California Angels and New York Mets
- Larry Wolfe, infielder, 1977-1980, Minnesota Twins and Boston Red Sox
- Clyde Wright, pitcher, 1966-1975, California Angels, Milwaukee Brewers and Texas Rangers
- Jaret Wright, pitcher, 1997-2007, Cleveland Indians, San Diego Padres, Atlanta Braves, New York Yankees and Baltimore Orioles
- Ron Wright, designated hitter, 2002-2002, Seattle Mariners

=== Basketball ===
- Danny Ainge, shooting guard, 1981-1995 Boston Celtics, Sacramento Kings, Portland Trail Blazers and Phoenix Suns
- Ambrosia Anderson, forward, WNBA, 2006-2006, Connecticut Sun and New York Liberty
- Jordan Bachynski, center, Arizona State, (2010-2014)
- Thurl Bailey, power forward-center, 1983-1999, Utah Jazz and Minnesota Timberwolves
- Shawn Bradley, center, 1993-2005, Philadelphia 76ers, New Jersey Nets and Dallas Mavericks
- Elijah Bryant (born 1995), shooting guard-small forward currently in the Israeli Basketball Premier League; formerly in the NBA, 2021-2021, Milwaukee Bucks
- Branden Carlson, center, 2025-now, Oklahoma City Thunder
- Tom Chambers, power forward, 1981-1997, San Diego Clippers, Seattle SuperSonics, Phoenix Suns, Utah Jazz, Charlotte Hornets and Philadelphia 76ers
- Kyle Collinsworth, point guard, 2017-2018, Dallas Mavericks
- Krešimir Ćosić, center, Olympic three-time Medalist, Gold Medal Winner 1980, two-time Silver Medal Winner 1968 and 1976 and 5th Place 1972, Team Yugoslavia
- Brandon Davies, center, 2013-2015, Philadelphia 76ers and Brooklyn Nets
- Devin Durrant, small forward, 1984-1985, Indiana Pacers and Phoenix Suns
- Jim Eakins, center, 1968-1978, Oakland Oaks, Washington Caps, Virginia Squires, Utah Stars, New York Nets, Kansas City Kings, San Antonio Spurs and Milwaukee Bucks
- Jimmer Fredette, point guard-shooting guard, 2011-2019, Sacramento Kings, Chicago Bulls, New Orleans Pelicans, New York Knicks and Phoenix Suns
- Josh Grant, power forward, 1993-1994, Golden State Warriors
- Travis Hansen, shooting guard-small forward, 2003-2004, Atlanta Hawks
- Vernon Hatton, guard, 1958-1962, Cincinnati Royals, Philadelphia Warriors, Chicago Packers and St. Louis Hawks
- Mel Hutchins, power forward-center, 1951-1958, Milwaukee Hawks, Fort Wayne Pistons and New York Knicks
- Frank Jackson, shooting Guard, 2017-2023, New Orleans Pelicans, Detroit Pistons and Utah Jazz
- Casey Jacobsen, shooting guard-small forward, 2002–2008, Phoenix Suns, New Orleans Hornets and Memphis Grizzlies
- Ken James, guard, 1972 Olympic Games, Team Australia
- Alex Jensen, standout small forward for The University of Utah, 1994-1995, 1997-2000
- Britton Johnsen, small forward-power forward, 2003-2004, Orlando Magic and Indiana Pacers
- Jeff Judkins, shooting guard-small forward, 1978–1983, Boston Celtics, Utah Jazz, Detroit Pistons and Portland Trail Blazers
- Bob King, head coach (1962-1978), New Mexico and Indiana State. Helped recruit Larry Bird to Indiana State.
- Greg Kite, center, 1983–1995, Boston Celtics, Los Angeles Clippers, Charlotte Hornets, Sacramento Kings, Orlando Magic, New York Knicks and Indiana Pacers
- Travis Knight, center, 1996–2003, Los Angeles Lakers, Boston Celtics and New York Knicks
- Mark Madsen, power forward-center, 2000-2009, Los Angeles Lakers and Minnesota Timberwolves
- Pace Mannion, small forward, 1983-1989, Golden State Warriors, Utah Jazz, New Jersey Nets, Milwaukee Bucks, Detroit Pistons and Atlanta Hawks
- Nonila "Noni" (née Wharemate) Martin, Olympic point guard, 2004 and 2008, Team New Zealand
- Charmian (née Purcell) Mellars, Olympic shooting guard, 2008, Team New Zealand
- Sam Merrill, shooting guard, 2020-present, Milwaukee Bucks, Memphis Grizzlies and Cleveland Cavaliers
- Eric Mika, center, 2020-2020, Sacramento Kings
- Leilani Mitchell, point guard, WNBA, 2008-2021, New York Liberty, Phoenix Mercury, Washington Mystics
- Dick Nemelka, shooting guard, 1970-1971, Utah Stars
- Eddie Palubinskas, guard, 1972 and 1976 Olympic Games, Team Australia
- Jabari Parker, power forward, 2014-2022, Milwaukee Bucks, Chicago Bulls, Washington Wizards, Atlanta Hawks, Sacramento Kings and Boston Celtics
- Raegan (née Scott) Pebley, power forward-center, WNBA, 1997-1998, Utah Starzz and Cleveland Rockers
- Brendon Pongia, "Tall Blacks" (NZ)
- Mark Pope, head coach Kentucky, (2024-Present), power forward-small forward, 1997-2005, Indiana Pacers, Milwaukee Bucks, New York Knicks and Denver Nuggets
- Kristen Rasmussen, center, WNBA, 2000-2008, Utah Starzz, Miami Sol, Indiana Fever, Houston Comets, Charlotte Sting, Phoenix Mercury, Connecticut Sun and Minnesota Lynx
- Craig Raymond, center, 1969-1973, Philadelphia 76ers, Pittsburgh Pipers, Los Angeles Stars, Memphis Pros, The Floridians, San Diego Conquistadors and Indiana Pacers
- Fred Roberts, power forward-center, 1983-1997, San Antonio Spurs, Utah Jazz, Boston Celtics, Milwaukee Bucks and Cleveland Cavaliers, Los Angeles Lakers and Dallas Mavericks
- Dave Rose, coach at BYU
- Mitch Smith, power forward and center, 1989-1999, University of Utah (1985-1989)
- Michael Smith, small forward, 1989-1995, Boston Celtics and Los Angeles Clippers
- Natalie (née Purcell) Taylor, Olympic small forward, 2008, Team New Zealand
- Jonathan Tavernari, guard-forward, Brazil
- Cat Thompson, forward, Montana State (1926-1930)
- Erin Thorn, shooting guard, WNBA, 2003-2013, New York Liberty, Chicago Sky, Minnesota Lynx and Indiana Fever
- Andy Toolson, shooting guard-small forward, 1990-1996, Utah Jazz
- Danny Vranes, power forward, 1981-1988, Seattle SuperSonics and Philadelphia 76ers
- Natalie Williams, power forward, WNBA, 1996–2005, Portland Power, Utah Starzz and Indiana Fever
- Pāora Winitana, Olympic shooting guard, 2004, Team New Zealand The Tall Blacks, New Zealand National Basketball League (NZNBL), 1996-2016, North Harbour Vikings, North Harbour Kings, Hawke's Bay Hawks, Harbour Kings, New Zealand Breakers, Adelaide 36ers and Christchurch Cougars

=== Ice hockey ===
- Len Barrie, Centre, 1990-2001, Philadelphia Flyers, Florida Panthers, Pittsburgh Penguins and Los Angeles Kings
- Aaron Gavey, Centre, 1995-2006, Tampa Bay Lightning, Calgary Flames, Dallas Stars, Minnesota Wild, Toronto Maple Leafs and The Mighty Ducks of Anaheim
- Bryan Maxwell, defenceman, 1976–1985, in the World Hockey Association for the Cleveland Crusaders, Cincinnati Stingers, New England Whalers, and in the National Hockey League for the Minnesota North Stars, St. Louis Blues, Winnipeg Jets and Pittsburgh Penguins
- Brent Meeke, Winger, 1972-1977, California Golden Seals and Cleveland Barons
- Brad Mills, Centre, 2010-2014, New Jersey Devils and Chicago Blackhawks
- Brent Peterson, Winger, 1978-1989, Detroit Red Wings, Buffalo Sabres, Vancouver Canucks and Hartford Whalers
- Derek Ryan, Center-Right Wing, 2015-present, Carolina Hurricanes, Calgary Flames and Edmonton Oilers
- Gord Strate, Defenceman, 1956-1959 Detroit Red Wings

=== Rugby ===
==== Rugby league ====
- Fraser Anderson, second row-centre-wing, 2006-2008, Brisbane Broncos and Cronulla-Sutherland Sharks
- Ben Hannant, prop, 2005-2016, Sydney Roosters, Brisbane Broncos, Queensland Maroons, Canterbury-Bankstown Bulldogs, Australia Kangaroos and North Queensland Cowboys
- Albert Hopoate, centre, 2008-2008, Sydney Roosters
- John Hopoate, wing, 1993-2005, Manly Warringah Sea Eagles, Tonga, New South Wales Blues, Australia Kangaroos, Sydney Capitals, Wests Tigers and Northern Eagles
- William Hopoate, centre-fullback-wing, 2011-present, Manly-Warringah Sea Eagles, Sydney Capitals, New South Wales Blues, Parramatta Eels, Canterbury-Bankstown Bulldogs, Tonga and St Helens Saints
- Krisnan Inu, centre-wing, 2007-present, Parramatta Eels, New Zealand Kiwis, New Zealand Warriors, Canterbury-Bankstown Bulldogs, Toa Samoa (Samoan Warriors), Catalans Dragons, Widnes Vikings, Salford Red Devils, Lézignan Sangliers and Leigh Leopards
- Kylie Leuluai, prop, 1999-2015, [New Zealand Māori, Balmain Tigers, Wests Tigers, Sydney Roosters, Parramatta Eels, Manly Warringah Sea Eagles, Toa Samoa (Samoan Warriors), Leeds Rhinos and International Origin Exiles
- Semi Radradra, wing-centre, 2013-2016, Parramatta Eels, Fiji Bati, World All Stars, Australia Kangaroos and Prime Minister's XIII
- Jordan Rapana, wing-fullback-centre, 2008-present, Gold Coast Titans, New Zealand Māori, Canberra Raiders, Cook Islands Kuki's, New Zealand Kiwis and Hull F.C.
- Young Tonumaipea, wing-centre-fullback, 2014-present, Toa Samoa (Samoan Warriors), Melbourne Storm and Gold Coast Titans
- Maka Unufe, center, 2022-present, Houston SaberCats

==== Rugby union ====
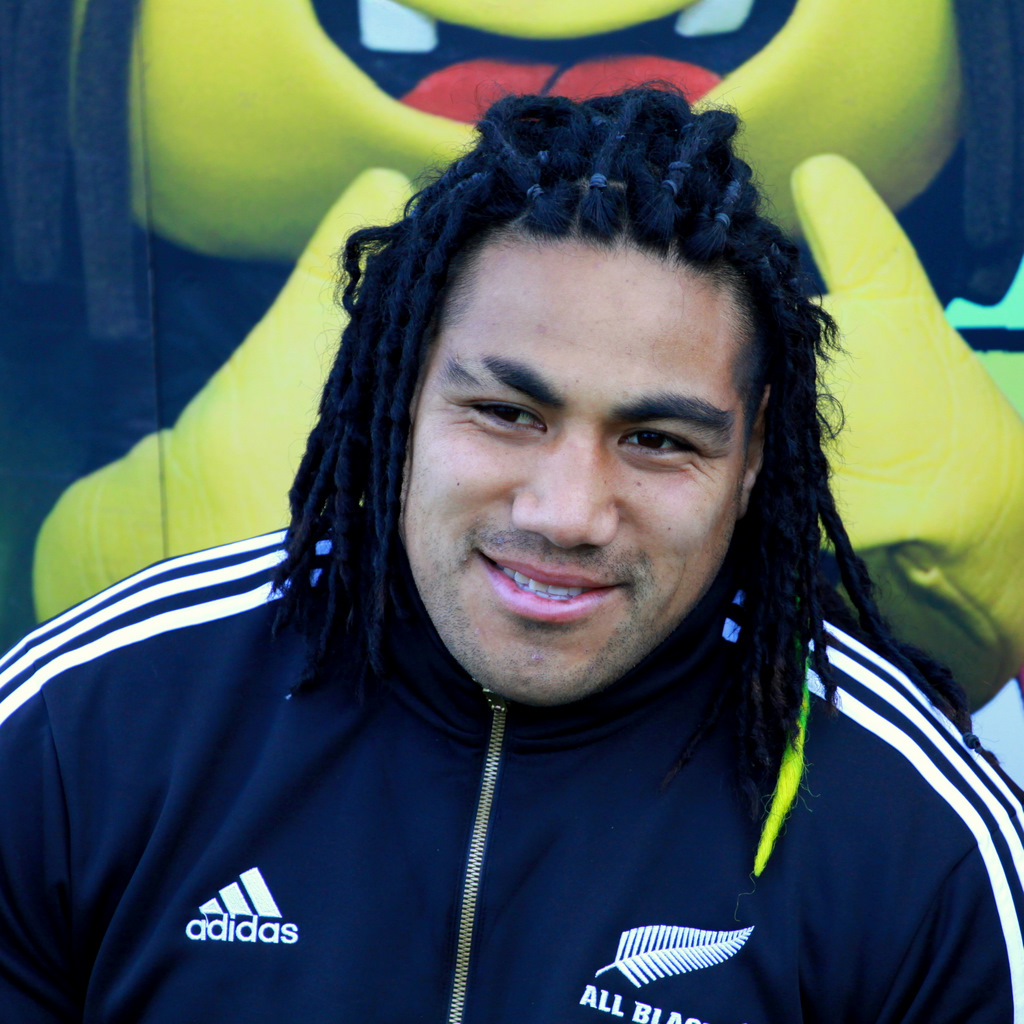
Ma'a Nonu of the All Blacks

- Fraser Anderson, wing, 2010-2014, Kobelco Kobe Steelers and Tonga
- Bui Baravilala, fullback, 2014–present, Team USA (Eagles): Women's Rugby XVs
- Ben Couch, first five-eighth, 1945-1950, Wairarapa Rugby Football Union, New Zealand All Blacks and Māori All Blacks (later became a Politician)
- Larry Gelwix, rugby coach, 1975-2011, Highland Rams and the inspiration behind the movie Forever Strong (2008)
- Sid Going, halfback and team captain, 1965-1978, Northland Rugby Union, New Zealand All Blacks and Māori All Blacks
- Krisnan Inu, centre-wing, 2007-present, Stade Français Paris Les Stadistes (Pink Army)
- Natasha Kai, former Olympic gold medal winner in soccer, 2008, Team USA, now one of the first to play Rugby, 2011, for Team USA, see also in Martial Arts and Soccer
- Jonah Lomu, winger and all-time top scorer at Rugby World Cup, 1994-2010, Counties Manukau Steelers, New Zealand U21 All Blacks, New Zealand All Blacks, Auckland Blues, New Zealand Barbarians, New Zealand A All Blacks XV, Waikato Chiefs, Hau Āwhiowhio (Wellington Hurricanes), Wellington Lions, Barbarians (Baa-Baas), Cardiff Blues, North Harbour and Marseille Vitrolles
- Ma'a Nonu, centre-wing, 2002-2021, New Zealand All Blacks Sevens, Wellington Lions, New Zealand All Blacks, Hau Āwhiowhio (Wellington Hurricanes), Junior All Blacks, Barbarian (Baa-Baas), Ricoh Black Rams, Auckland Blues, New Zealand Highlanders, Rugby Club Toulonnais, San Diego Legion and Ngati Porou East Coast
- Semi Radradra, centre-wing-fullback, 2011-present, Baby Flying Fijians, Fiji Sevens, Rugby Club Toulonnais, Union Bordeaux Bègles Les Girondins (The Girondists), Fiji Flying Fijians and Bristol Bears
- Jordan Rapana, wing-fullback-centre, 2012-2020, Western Force and Saitama Wild Knights
- Ashley Steacy, Canadian player, team gold medalist 2016, Team Canada: Women's Sevens Team
- Young Tonumaipea, wing-centre, 2021-present, Melbourne Rebels
- Maka Unufe, center, 2011–2022, Team USA: Men's Sevens Team

=== Miscellaneous ===
==== Track and field ====
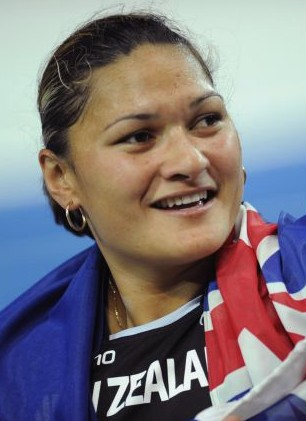
Valerie Adams

- Valerie Adams, Olympic shot putter, two-time Olympic gold medalist, 2008 and 2012, silver medalist, 2016 and bronze medalist 2020, Team New Zealand
- Lindsey Anderson, Olympic middle distance and steeplechase runner, 2008, Team USA
- Niklas Arrhenius, Olympic discus thrower, 2008, Team Sweden
- Wade Bell, Olympic middle-distance runner, 800 meters, 1968, Team USA
- April Steiner Bennett, Olympic pole vaulter, 2008, Team USA
- Peter Bol, Olympic middle-distance runner, (800 meters), 2016 and 2020, Team Australia
- Jillian Camarena-Williams, Olympic shot putter, 2008 and 2012, Team USA
- Roberto Carmona, Olympic decathlete, 1968, Team Mexico
- Ed Eyestone, Olympic long-distance runner, marathon, 1988 and 1992, Team USA
- Richard George, Olympic javelin thrower, 1976, Team USA
- Creed Haymond, Olympic sprinter, but he was injured just before the competition 1920, Team USA
- Lydia Jele, Olympic sprinter, 400 meters, 2016, Team Botswana
- C. Kunalan, Olympic sprinter, Men's 4 × 100 meters relay, for Team Malaysia in 1964, then the men's 100 meters and men's 200 meters, for Team Singapore in 1968
- Kenneth Lundmark, Olympic high jumper, 1968, Team Sweden
- Henry Marsh, Olympic 3,000 meter steeplechase runner, 1976, 1984, 1988, Team USA
- Joshua McAdams, Olympic 3,000 meter steeplechase runner, 2008, Team USA
- Jess Mortensen, National Track and Field Hall of Fame, decathlon athlete, declared ineligible at the 1932 Olympics, Team USA
- Doug Padilla, Olympic middle and long-distance runner, 1984 and 1988, Team USA
- Doral Pilling, Olympic javelin thrower, 12th in the javelin, 1928, Team Canada
- Ed Red, Olympic javelin thrower, 12th in 1964, Team USA
- Alma Richards, Olympic athlete, gold medal in high jump, 1912, Team USA
- Clarence Robison, Olympic long-distance runner, 5000 meters, 1948, Team USA
- Kenneth Rooks, Olympic 3,000 meter steeplechase runner, silver medalist, 2024, Team USA
- Keith Russell, Olympic diver, 3-meter springboard and 10-meter platform, 1968, Team USA
- Dale Schofield, Olympic hurdler, 400 meters hurdles, 1936, Team USA
- Jay Silvester, Olympic discus thrower, silver medalist 1972, and finished 4th in 1964, 5th in 1968 and 8th in 1976, Team USA
- Jason Smyth, Paralympics sprinter, six-time gold medalist, 2008, 2012, 2016 and 2020, Team Ireland
- Usaia Sotutu, Olympic long distance and steeplechase runner, 5000 meters, 10,000 meters and 3,000-meter steeplechase, Team Fiji
- Patricia Taea, Olympic sprinter, 100 meters, 2012 and 2016, Team Cook Islands
- Saimoni Tamani, Olympic sprinter, qualified for 400 metres, but was injured before the competition, 1972, Team Fiji
- Jared Ward, Olympic long-distance runner, marathon, 2016, Team USA
- Jack Yerman, Olympic sprinter, gold medalist and setting a world record for 4 x 400 meters relay, 6th Place 400 metres (400-Meter Dash), 1960, Team USA; also played fullback for University of California, Berkeley Golden Bears football team in the 1959, Rose Bowl

==== Auto racing ====
- David Abbott "Ab" Jenkins, professional race car driver, 1925–1951, (and mayor of Salt Lake City, 1940–1944,)
- Cooper Webb, Motocross, three-time 450SX Champion

==== Beach volleyball ====
- Jake Gibb, Olympian 2008, 2012 and 2016, Team USA
- Casey Patterson, Olympian, 2016, Team USA

==== Bobsleighing/bobsleding ====
- David Bissett, Olympic Bobsledder, Bronze Medal Winner, 2010 and competed in 2006 and 2014, Team Canada
- Christopher Fogt, Olympic Bobsledder, Silver Medal Winner in 2014, and competed in 2010, 2014 (two-man too) and 2018, Team USA
- Shauna Rohbock, Olympic Bobsledder, Silver Medal Winner, 2006, and 6th Place in 2010, Team USA; see also professional Soccer

==== Bodybuilding ====
- Larry Scott, IFBB Professional BodyBuilder, 1960–1966, won the inaugural 1965 Mr. Olympia competition and defended the crown at the 1966 Mr. Olympia contest before retiring

==== Boxing ====
- Jay Lambert, Olympic Boxer, Heavyweight Division in 1948, Team USA
- Jack Dempsey, Professional Boxer, 1914–1927, World Heavyweight Boxing Champion, 1919-1926
- B. J. Flores, Professional Boxer, United States Amateur Heavyweight Champion, 2001–2002, Cruiserweight-Heavyweight, 2003–2018, Boxing Commentator, 2012–present, and Boxing Trainer, 2021–present
- Gene Fullmer, Professional Boxer, 1951–1963, World Middleweight Boxing Champion 1957-1962
- Joseph Parker, Professional Boxer, 2012–present, WBO Heavyweight Boxing Champion, 2016-2018
- Willard Bean, Professional Boxer, 1897–1902, claimed to be the World Middleweight Boxing Champion in 1905

==== Fencing ====
- María Gabriela Martínez Gascón, Olympic Épée Fencer, 2008 and 2012, Team Venezuela

==== Golf ====
- Billy Casper, World Golf Hall of Fame, Professional Golfer on PGA Tour 1956–1975, represented the United States on a then-record eight Ryder Cup teams, 1961 Winners, 1963 Winners, 1965 Winners, 1967 Winners, 1969 Winners, 1971 Winners, 1973 Winners, 1975 Winners, was non-playing Captain of the 1979 Winners, and Senior PGA Tour (now PGA Tour Champions), 1981–1989, Ranked as the 15th Greatest Golfer of all time by Golf Digest magazine in July 2000
- Keith Clearwater, Professional Golfer, 1982–present, on PGA Tour 1987–2021, PGA Tour Champions 2009-2021
- Johnny Miller, World Golf Hall of Fame, Professional Golfer on PGA Tour 1969–1981, represented the United States on Ryder Cup teams, 1975 Winners and 1981 Winners, represented the Team USA on World Cup teams, 1973 Winners/Individual Winner, 1975 Winners/Individual Winner, and 1980, and Lead Golf Analyst (Broadcaster/Commentator) for NBC Sports, 1990-2019
- Tony Finau, Professional Golfer, on PGA Tour 2007–present
- Bruce Summerhays, Professional Golfer, on PGA Tour, 1966-199?, on Team USA for the PGA Cup 1977 (tie) and 1978, then Champions Tour, 1994-2010
- Daniel Summerhays, Professional Golfer, on PGA Tour, 2007-2020

==== Gymnastics ====
- George Greenfield, Olympic artistic gymnast, 1972, Team USA
- Dorothy Dale Elizabeth McClements-Kephart, Olympic artistic gymnast, 1964, Team USA
- MyKayla Skinner, Olympic artistic gymnast, an alternate for 2016 and won a silver medal in Women's Vault, 2020 for Team USA
- Peter Vidmar, U.S. Olympic Hall of Fame and International Gymnastics Hall of Fame, Olympic gymnast and team captain, two-time Gold Medal Winner and a Silver Medal Winner in 1984, for Team USA

==== Luge ====
- Kate Hansen, Olympic Luger, 2014, Team USA
- Christian Niccum, Olympic Luger, 2006 Singles, 2010 Doubles, 2014 Doubles and 2014 Team Relay, Team USA

==== Martial arts ====
- Diego Brandão, Mixed Martial Artist, specializing in Brazilian Jiu-Jitsu, Featherweight Lightweight, UFC Fighter, RIZIN, and Fight Nights Global, 2005–present, and won The Ultimate Fighter 14 on 21 Sep 2011, becoming the first ever Brazilian to win The Ultimate Fighter
- Rulon Gardner, Hall of Fame Olympic Greco-Roman Style Heavyweight Wrestler, Gold Medal Winner, beat Hidehiko Yoshida in a Judo vs. Wrestling Mixed Martial Arts (MMA) Bout, see also Wrestling, Film, Television and Stage Personalities and Writers
- Natasha Kai, former Olympic Gold Medal Winner in Soccer, 2008, Team USA, tries her hand at MMA, trained in Jujutsu, 2023–present, see also in Rugby and Soccer
- Ed Parker, Martial Artist, Actor, Senior Grandmaster, and Founder of American Kenpo Karate, (creating it from Karate, Kenpō and Judo), 1949–1990

==== Race walking ====
- John Nunn, Olympic Race Walker, 2004 and 2012, Team USA

==== Rodeo ====
- Earl W. Bascom, "Father of modern Rodeo"; Inventor and Innovator
- Lewis Feild, World champion
- Reg Kesler, Canadian Champion, Rodeo Producer
- Raymond Knight, Hall of Fame, Rodeo Producer, "Father of Canadian Stampedes"
- Dale D. Smith, Consecutive Team Roping Championships 1956–1957, Inducted into the Pro Rodeo Hall of Fame in 1977, Inducted into the National Cowboy Hall of Fame in 1995

==== Rowing (crew) ====
- Robert Detweiler, Olympic Competition Coxed Eight Rower, Gold Medal Winner, Men's Coxed Eight Rowing Teams, 1952, Team USA
- Lucia Palermo, Olympic Sculls Rower, 2004, 2012 and 2016, Team Argentina

==== Skeleton racing ====
- Eric Neilson, Olympic Skeleton Racer, 2014, Team Canada
- Noelle Pikus-Pace, Olympic Skeleton Racer, Silver Medal Winner, 2014, and 4th place in 2010, Team USA

==== Skiing (snow) ====
- Rowena Bright, Olympic Alpine Skier, 2002, Team Australia
- Erik Fisher, Downhill and Super-G Olympic and World Cup Alpine Skier, qualified for 2010 Winter Olympics, Team USA but was injured; has also raced in the 2009 World Championships and World Cups, 2009-2012
- Steven Nyman, Olympic Alpine Skier, 2006, 2010 and 2014, Team USA

==== Snowboarding ====
- Torah Bright, Olympic Halfpipe, Slopestyle and Boarder-Cross Snowboarder, Gold Medalist in Halfpipe, 2010 and silver medal in Halfpipe, 2014, Team Australia, and X Games two-time gold medalist, 2007 and 2009
- Jessika Jenson, Olympic Slopestyle Snowboarder, 2014 and 2018, Team USA

==== Softball ====
- Laura Berg, USA Softball Hall of Fame honoree, Olympic outfielder, three-time gold medal winner, 1996, 2000, 2004 and silver medal winner, 2008, Team USA, professionally Women's Pro Softball League (WPSL), with WPSL Gold, 2001, assistant coach, California State University, Fresno Bulldogs and Oregon State University Beavers, 2000–2012, and head coach, Oregon State University Beavers, 2013–present
- Tairia Flowers, Olympic First basewoman and catcher, gold medal winner, 2004, silver medal winner, 2008, Team USA, professionally, Arizona Heat, 2005-2005, assistant coach, University of California Riverside (UCR) Highlanders and Long Beach State 49ers, 2006–2010, head coach, Cal State Northridge Matadors and Loyola Marymount University Lions, 2011–present

==== Sports shooting ====
- Arnold Vitarbo, Olympic sports shooter, fourth place in 50-metre pistol, 1968, Team USA

==== Swimming and diving ====
- Jack Horsley, Olympic Backstroke Swimmer, Bronze Medal Winner, 1968, Team USA
- Lelei (née Fonoimoana) Moore, Olympic butterfly stroke and medley relay swimmer, silver medalist in 4 x 100 meter medley relay, 1976, Team USA
- Paula Jean Myers-Pope, Olympic Diver, Silver Medal Winner 10 metre platform (10-Meter Tower), 1952, Team USA, Bronze Medal Winner 10 metre platform (10-Meter Tower), 1956, Team USA, and two-time Silver Medal Winner 10 metre platform (10-Meter Tower) and 3 Metre Springboard (3-Meter Springboard), 1960, Team USA
- Lacey Nymeyer, Olympic Freestyle Swimmer, 2008, Team USA
- Hayley Palmer, Olympic Freestyle Swimmer, 2008 and 2012, Team New Zealand
- Mary Jane Sears, Olympic Breaststroke and Butterfly Swimmer, Bronze Medal Winner, 1956, Team USA
- Byron Shefchik, Breaststroke Swimmer, 5-time All-American, 1992–1998, BYU Cougars, only male member of the BYU Swim and Diving Team to be in the BYU Hall of Fame

==== Volleyball ====
- Richard "Rich" Lambourne, Olympic Libero, Gold Medal Winner 2008, Team USA, and professionally for Aon Hotvolleys Vienna (Vienna, Austria, Hot Volleyers), Piet Zoomers Apeldoorn (Apeldoorn, Netherlands, Peter Zoomers), G.S. Lamias Achilleus (Lamias, Greece, Achilles), Noliko Maaseik (Maaseik, Belgium, Not Much), Indykpol AZS Olsztyn (Olsztyn, Poland, Indykpol), Lokomotiv-Belogorie (Belogorie, Russia, Locomotives), Delecta Bydgoszcz (Bydgoszcz, Poland, Delights), Fart Kielce (Kielce, Poland, Lucky) and Al-Arabi Sports Club Fareeg Al-Ahlam (Arabi, Qatar, Dream Team), 2001-2013
- Ryan Millar, Olympic Middle Blocker, 2000, 2004 and Gold Medal Winner 2008, Team USA, and professionally for Volley Forlì (Forli, Italy, Volleyballers), Acqua Paradiso Gabeca Montichiari (Monza, Italy, Gabeca Montichiari Water Paradise Volleyballers), Trentino Volley (Trento, Italy, Volleyers), Sparkling Milano (Milan, Italy, Sparkling), İstanbul Büyükşehir Belediyespor (Istanbul Metropolitan Municipality Sports Club), Asseco Resovia Rzeszów Pasy (Resovia Stripes), VC Lokomotiv Novosibirsk (Novosibirsk Locomotives), 2000–2012, including Pro Gold Medal at FIVB Volleyball World League, 2008 and Pro Bronze Medal in 2007
- Taylor Sander, Olympic Outside Hitter, 2012-2021 Team USA and 2014-2021 professionally for BluVolley Verona, Beijing BAIC Motor Men, Al Arabi Doha, Volley Lube, Sada Cruzeiro and Skra Bełchatów Pszczoły (The Bees)

==== Weightlifting ====
- Melanie Roach, Olympic Weightlifter, 2008 (also an injured alternate for 2000), Team USA
- Sarah Robles, Olympic Weightlifter, two-time bronze medalist, 2016 and 2020, Team USA

==== Wrestling ====
- Chyna, World Wrestling Federation, 1995-2011
- Rulon Gardner, Hall of Fame Olympic Greco-Roman Style Heavyweight Wrestler, Gold Medal Winner 2000 and Bronze Medal Winner 2004, Team USA, see also Martial Arts, Film, Television and Stage Personalities and Writers
- Don Leo Jonathan, "The Mormon Giant", a second-generation Heavyweight Professional Wrestler, National Wrestling Alliance, 1949–1980, including two-time MAC World Heavyweight Championship in 1955
- Cael Sanderson, Hall of Fame Olympic Freestyle 84 kg-Weight Class Wrestler, Gold Medal Winner, 2004, Team USA, and undefeated Collegiate/Folkstyle Wrestler, 159-0 Won-Loss Record, becoming a four-time NCAA Division I Champion, 1999–2002, Iowa State University Cyclones current head coach of the Penn State Nittany Lions and currently won 11 NCAA team titles with PSU.

== Business ==
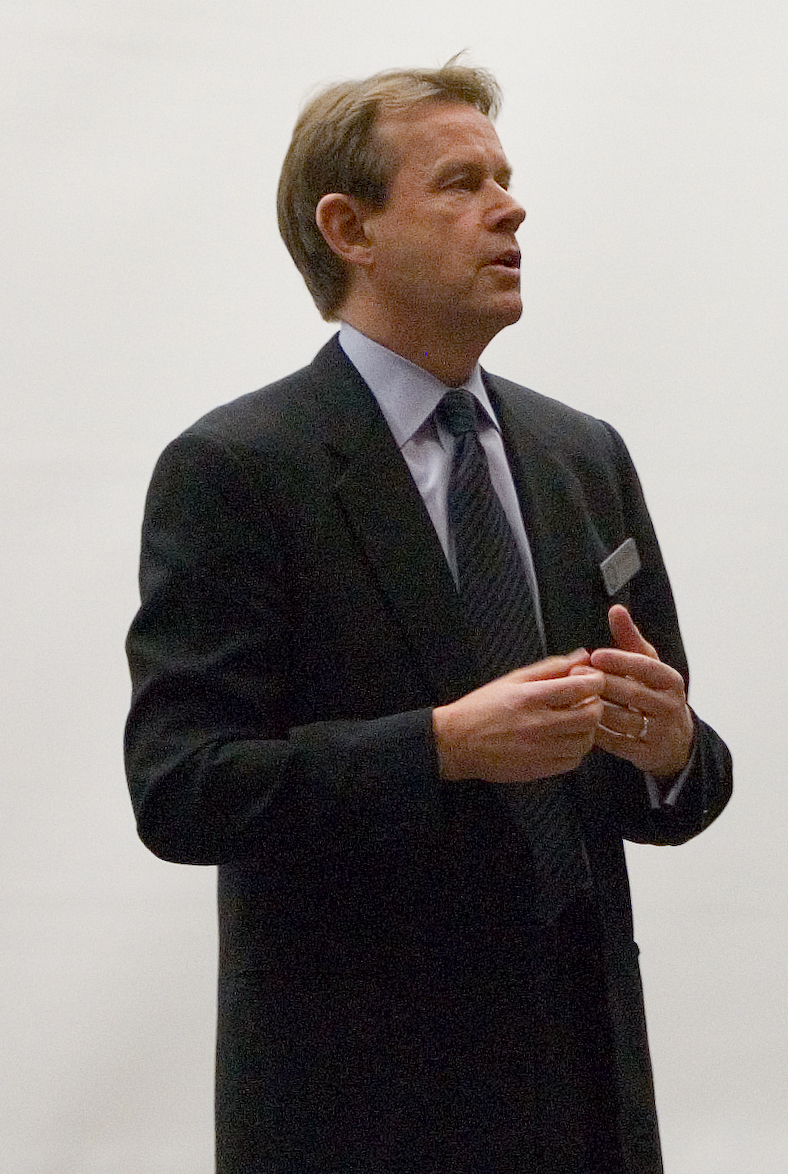
Kevin Rollins

- Nolan D. Archibald, CEO of Black & Decker
- Alan Ashton, co-founder and former CEO of WordPerfect Corporation
- M. Anthony Burns, chairman emeritus of the board of directors; former CEO of Ryder
- Clayton Christensen, Professor of Business Administration at Harvard Business School, Author, Scholar, Educator, Business Consultant, Ranked in the Thinkers50
- Gary Crittenden, former CFO of Sears Roebuck and Company, Monsanto Company, American Express and Citigroup
- Sheri Dew, CEO of Deseret Book, the largest Latter-day Saint book publisher
- David Eccles
- Pete Harman, first Franchisee of KFC
- Jon Huntsman Sr.
- Steven J. Lund, co-founder of Nu Skin Enterprises
- J.W. "Bill" Marriott Jr., Chairman and CEO, Marriott International
- J. Willard Marriott
- Gail Miller, Businesswoman, Philanthropist, and former owner of the Utah Jazz
- Larry H. Miller, businessman and former owner of the Utah Jazz
- David Neeleman, founder of JetBlue Airways and Azul Brazilian Airlines
- Ray Noorda, CEO and chairman of Novell
- Kevin Rollins, former CEO of Dell, Inc.
- George W. Romney, former chairman and president of American Motors Company
- James LeVoy Sorenson, founder of Sorenson Companies
- Cydni Tetro, CEO of Brandless, co-founder of Women Tech Council
- Frank L. VanderSloot, CEO of multi-level marketing company Melaleuca, Inc.

== Law ==
=== Judicial ===
- Judge Michael W. Mosman, United States District Judge, former Chief Judge of District of Oregon
- Judge Stephen H. Anderson, senior Federal Judge on the United States Court of Appeals for the Tenth Circuit
- Judge Jay Bybee, current Federal Judge on the United States Court of Appeals for the Ninth Circuit
- Chief Justice Christine M. Durham, Utah Supreme Court
- Judge Thomas B. Griffith, D.C. Circuit
- Justice Charles Jones, retired Arizona State Supreme Court
- Judge Ryan D. Nelson, Federal Judge on the United States Court of Appeals for the Ninth Circuit
- Justice Dallin H. Oaks, retired Utah Supreme Court, president of The Church of Jesus Christ of Latter-day Saints
- Judge N. Randy Smith, Federal Judge on the United States Court of Appeals for the Ninth Circuit
- Judge Thomas L. Steffen, Nevada Supreme Court

=== Enforcement ===
- Samuel P. Cowley (1899–1934), FBI agent killed in the line of duty by Baby Face Nelson
- Porter Rockwell, deputy US Marshal of Salt Lake City (1849–1878); bodyguard of LDS founder Joseph Smith

== Educators and scholars ==
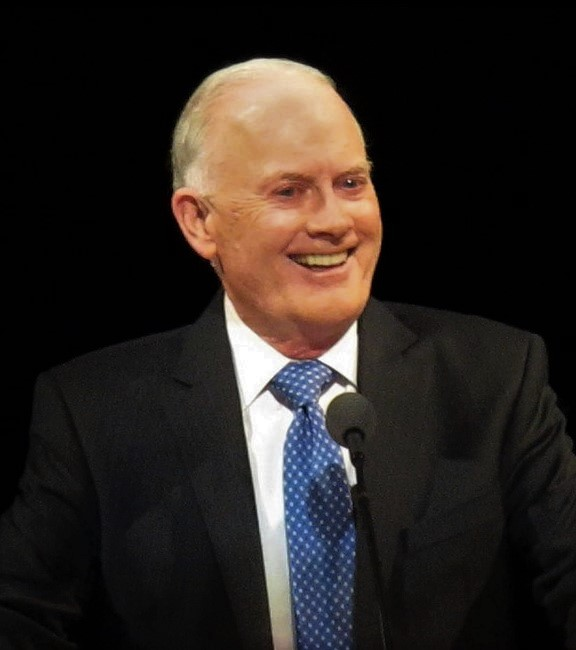
Kim B. Clark

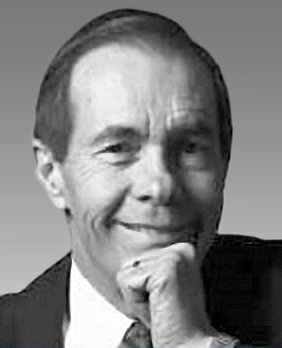
Rex E. Lee

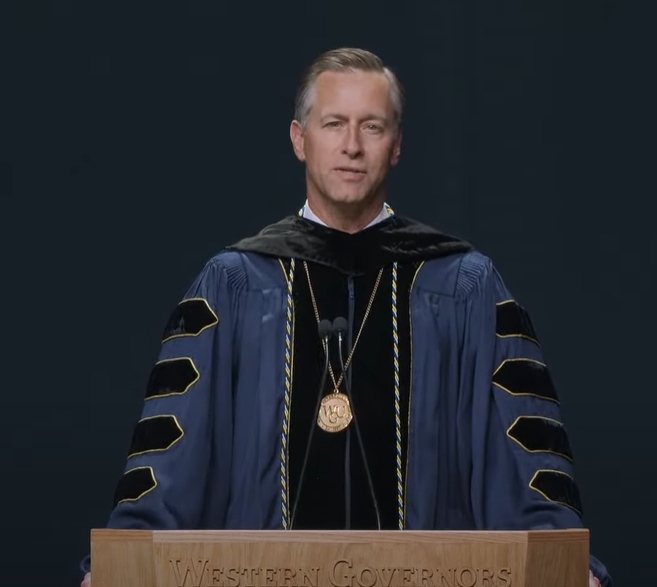
Scott Pulsipher

- David A. Bednar, president of Brigham Young University-Idaho (1997–2004)
- Michael T. Benson, president of Snow College (2002-2007), Southern Utah University (2007-2013), Eastern Kentucky University (2013-2020), Coastal Carolina University (2021-2025), West Virginia University (2025-Present).
- Richard Bushman, professor of history emeritus at Columbia University
- David E. Campbell, Packey J. Dee Professor of American Democracy at the University of Notre Dame
- Stanford Cazier, president of California State University, Chico (1971–1979) and Utah State University (1979–1992)
- Clayton Christensen, professor at Harvard Business School
- Kim B. Clark, Commissioner of Church Education (2015–current); president of Brigham Young University-Idaho (2005–2015); dean of Harvard Business School (1995–2005); professor
- Alison Davis-Blake, Dean of Ross School of Business of the University of Michigan (2011–present)
- Henry B. Eyring, president of Ricks College (1972–77), associate professor of business at Stanford University, Sloan visiting faculty fellow at the Massachusetts Institute of Technology, Commissioner of Church Education
- Teppo Felin, Professor of Strategy at the University of Oxford
- Jennifer Finlayson-Fife, psychologist and sexuality educator
- Kathleen Flake, historian, writer, and attorney
- Harvey Fletcher, head of physical research at Bell Laboratories, developed modern science of acoustics
- Gordon Gee, former president of Ohio State University
- David F. Holland, first LDS professor at the Harvard Divinity School (2012–present)
- Jeffrey R. Holland, Commissioner of Church Education; Brigham Young University president (1980–1989)
- Rex E. Lee, Brigham Young University president (1989–1995); inaugural J. Reuben Clark Law School dean; United States Solicitor General
- Brigitte C. Madrian, Behavioral economist and the first female dean of the Marriott School of Business.
- Truman G. Madsen, Brigham Young University professor and Chair of the BYU Jerusalem Center
- Karl G. Maeser, Brigham Young University president (1876–1892)
- Robert J. Matthews, scriptural scholar and Brigham Young University dean (1926–2009)
- Neal A. Maxwell, Commissioner of Church Education, executive vice president of the University of Utah
- Dean Lowe May, historian, University of Utah, author and documentary filmmaker
- Daniel McClellan, American theological scholar
- Whitney K. Newey, Professor of Economics at Massachusetts Institute of Technology
- Hugh Nibley, Brigham Young University professor, scholar, writer
- Janis Nuckolls, Brigham Young University professor, expert on endangered languages and the Quechua people
- Dallin H. Oaks, Brigham Young University president (1971–1980); justice of Utah Supreme Court (1980–1984)
- John Durham Peters, María Rosa Menocal Professor of English and Film & Media, Yale University (2016-Present), and of Communication, University of Iowa (1986–2016)
- V. Lane Rawlins, Washington State University President (2000–2007)
- Cecil O. Samuelson, Brigham Young University president (2003–2014)
- Eric B. Shumway, Brigham Young University-Hawaii president (1994–2007)
- Laurel Thatcher Ulrich, Harvard professor, winner of the Pulitzer Prize in History
- Steven C. Wheelwright, Brigham Young University-Hawaii president (2007–2015)
- Michael K. Young, Texas A&M University president (2015–2020)
- Scott Pulsipher, Western Governors University president (2016–Present)

== Media and entertainment figures ==
=== Writers ===
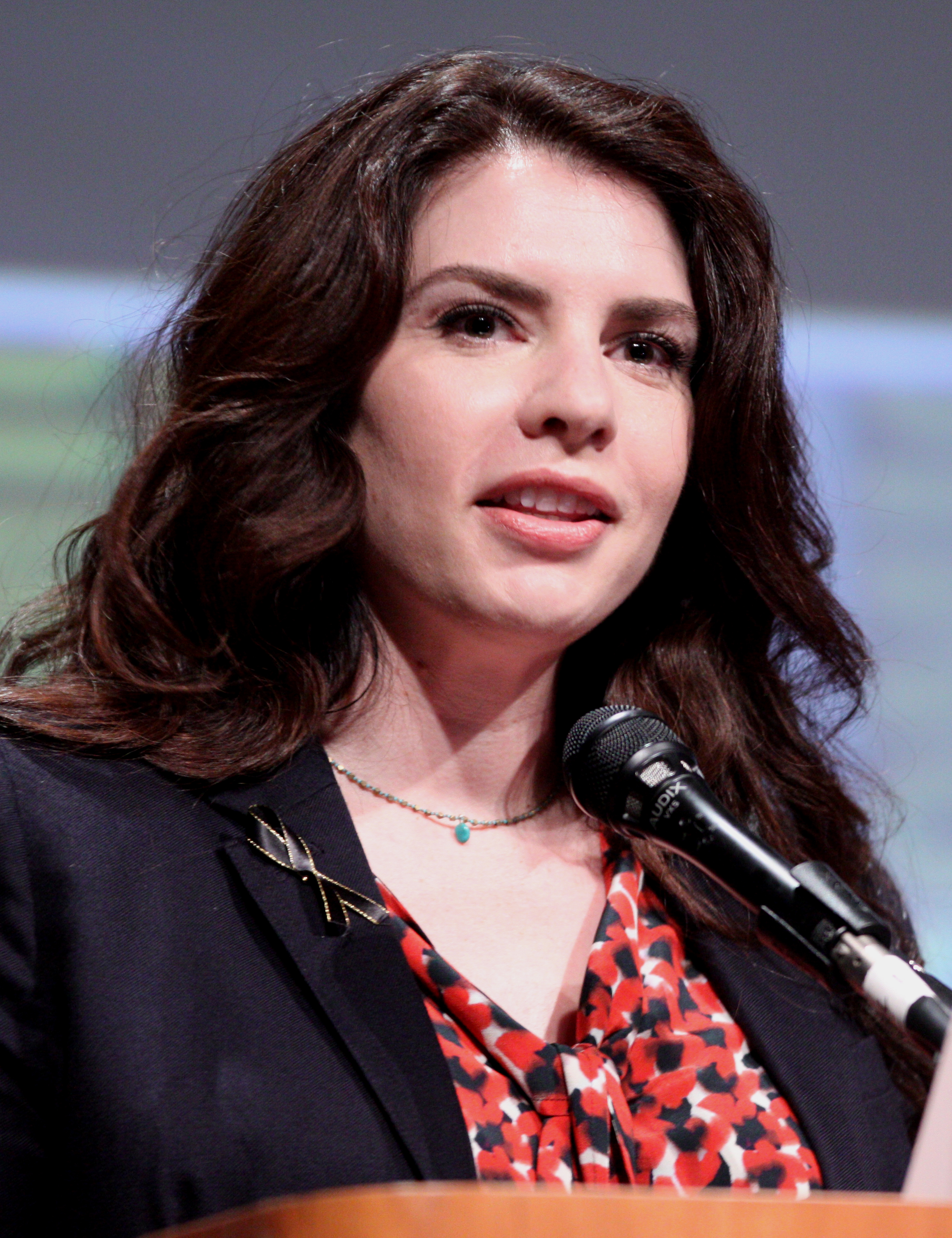
Stephenie Meyer

- Jack Anderson, Pulitzer Prize winning columnist and investigative journalist
- Orson Scott Card, author, Hugo Award and Nebula Award winner
- Ally Condie, author
- McKay Coppins, political journalist
- Stephen R. Covey, author of The 7 Habits of Highly Effective People
- Brian Crane, cartoonist (Pickles)
- James Dashner, author, known for writing the Maze runner series
- Bree Despain, author
- Betty Eadie, Author
- Rulon Gardner, Hall of Fame Olympic Greco-Roman Style Heavyweight Wrestler, Gold Medal Winner, together with Bob Schaller, Co-Authored a book in 2005 titled, Never Stop Pushing: My Life from a Wyoming Farm to the Olympic Medals Stand, see also Wrestling, Martial Arts and Film, Television and Stage Personalities
- Terryl Givens, author
- Betsy Brannon Green, author
- Shannon Hale, author, Newbery Honor recipient
- Chris Heimerdinger, author
- Tracy Hickman, author, Dragonlance
- Ken Jennings, winner of 74 straight Jeopardy! matches
- Janet Kay Jensen, author
- Scott Johnson, cartoonist
- Glen A. Larson, television writer and producer (Battlestar Galactica and Knight Rider)
- John Lyon, Scottish poet
- Greg McKeown, author and Young Global Leader
- Stephenie Meyer, author known for writing the Twilight series
- Brandon Mull, author
- Carol Lynn Pearson, poet, author and playwright
- Anne Perry, English author
- Julie Rowe, author
- Brandon Sanderson, author
- Linda Sillitoe (1948–2010), journalist, historian and author
- Kiersten White, author
- Dan Wells, author
- Larry Correia, author

=== Film, television and stage personalities ===
- Corbin Allred, Actor, former Child Star. Best known for: Saints and Soldiers, Robin Hood: Men in Tights, The Saratov Approach, Teen Angel, Sabrina the Teenage Witch, Granite Flats, 1993-present
- Larry Bagby, Actor. Best known for: Hocus Pocus, Saints and Soldiers, Walk the Line, The Young and the Restless, Buffy the Vampire Slayer and JAG, 1988-present
- Billy Barty, Actor
- Earl W. Bascom, Co-Producer and Actor, best known for The Lawless Rider
- Texas Rose Bascom, Actress and Rodeo Performer, best known for The Lawless Rider
- Glenn Beck, conservative talk-radio and television host
- Don Bluth, Animator, Creator of The Land Before Time, The Secret of NIMH, and An American Tail
- Wilford Brimley, actor
- Shay Carl, American video blogger
- Glen and Les Charles, writers and producers known for Taxi and Cheers
- Ray Combs, host of game show Family Feud
- Jairus Aquino, Filipino actor
- A.J. Cook, actress
- Chloe East, actress
- Steven Eckholdt, actor
- Mireille Enos, Tony Award-nominated actress
- Byron Foulger, actor
- Pierce Gagnon, child actor
- Rulon Gardner, Hall of Fame Olympic Greco-Roman Style Heavyweight Wrestler, Gold Medal Winner, appeared on Reality TV Shows, The Biggest Loser and I Survived...; also, TV Host for a Professional Wrestling League called Real Pro Wrestling, even served as an analyst for NBC Sports coverage of Wrestling at the 2008 Summer Olympics see also Wrestling, Martial Arts and Writer
- Al Harrington, former actor and NCAA football player
- Sharlene Wells Hawkes, Miss America 1985, ESPN reporter 1987-2002.
- Jake Heaps, frequent contributor and personality on 710 ESPN, a Seattle Sports-Talk Radio Station, including Co-Hosting the "Jake and Stacy Show", 2018-2022,
- Jon Heder, actor
- Kirby Heyborne, actor in The Last Chapter and TV shows Team and Free Ride; singer, albums include Inside, Braver Days, and Merry White Tree in the Night
- Bob Hilton, television game show announcer
- Dean Jagger, Oscar-winning actor
- Jane Clayson Johnson, journalist and anchor for Good Morning America, World News Tonight, ABC News, and The Early Show
- Gordon Jump, actor from WKRP in Cincinnati and the Maytag repair man
- Eric Larson, animator
- Jared Murillo, dancer in High School Musical, backup dancer and ex-boyfriend of Ashley Tisdale, member of boy band VFactory
- José María Oliveira, Spanish film director
- Merlin Olsen, NFL player; actor in Little House on the Prairie and Father Murphy
- Moroni Olsen, actor
- Pat Priest, actress, best known for portraying Marilyn Munster in The Munsters
- Aaron Ruell, actor known for playing Kip Dynamite on Napoleon Dynamite
- Rick Schroder, actor
- Kaycee Stroh, actress and dancer in High School Musical, High School Musical 2, and High School Musical 3: Senior Year
- Sophie Thatcher, actress and 'scream queen', most famous for Yellowjackets, Companion, and Heretic
- Ellen Wheeler, actress and executive producer of the soap opera Guiding Light
- Johnny Whitaker, actor, most famous for 1960s TV show Family Affair
- Grant Wilson, half of the Ghost Hunters team of paranormal investigators
- Alex Winters, presenter on the BBC's CBeebies channel
- Steve Zabriskie, television sports play-by-play broadcaster, actor and announcer

=== Reality stars and YouTubers ===
- Roman Atwood, YouTuber
- Hannah Neeleman, social media influencer, businesswoman
- Lisa Barlow, media personality and businesswoman, starred in The Real Housewives of Salt Lake City
- Mark Rober, YouTuber, engineer, inventor, educator
- Whitney Leavitt, media personality and social media influencer, starred in The Secret Lives of Mormon Wives
- Taylor Frankie Paul, media personality and social media influencer, starred in The Secret Lives of Mormon Wives
- Demi Engemann, media personality and social media influencer, starred in The Secret Lives of Mormon Wives
- Jen Affleck, media personality and social media influencer, starred in The Secret Lives of Mormon Wives
- Mikayla Matthews, media personality and social media influencer, starred in The Secret Lives of Mormon Wives
- Jessi Draper, media personality and social media influencer, starred in The Secret Lives of Mormon Wives
- Mayci Neeley, media personality and social media influencer, starred in The Secret Lives of Mormon Wives
- Layla Taylor, media personality and social media influencer, starred in The Secret Lives of Mormon Wives
- Miranda Hope, media personality and social media influencer, starred in The Secret Lives of Mormon Wives

=== Singers and musicians ===
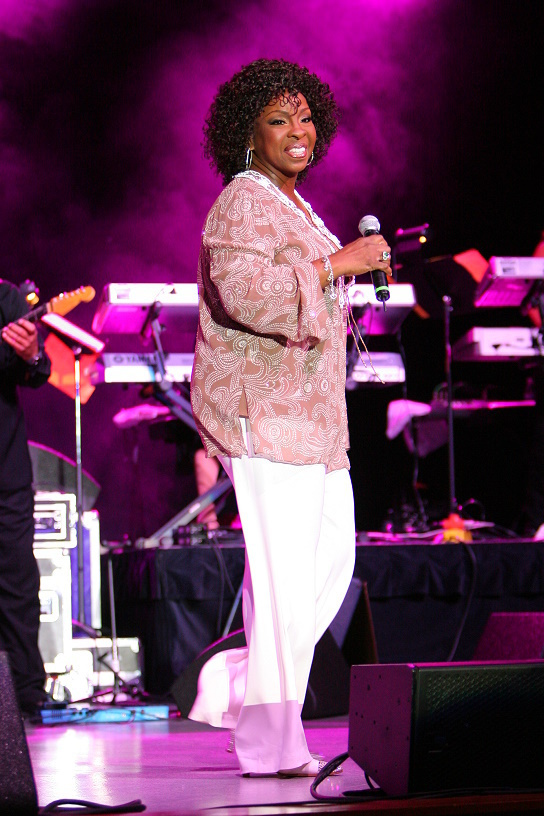
Gladys Knight

- The 5 Browns, sibling concert pianists (Desirae, Deondra, Gregory, Melody and Ryan)
- Gary Allan, American country singer, raised Mormon
- Loren Allred, American singer, songwriter, and actress
- Tiffany Alvord YouTube "home grown celebrity" singer
- Jenny Oaks Baker, Grammy-nominated recording artist and concert violinist
- Bless4, J-pop vocal ensemble
- Alex Boyé, singer
- Adassa, reggae singer, best known for her performance as Dolores Madrigal in Encanto
- Elaine Bradley, drummer of the Neon Trees, a rock band from Provo, Utah
- William Butler, multi-instrumentalist for the band Arcade Fire
- Lex de Azevedo, music arranger and songwriter for stage, TV and film
- Liriel Domiciano, Brazilian pop star icon and classical singer
- Brandon Flowers, frontman of The Killers
- Ian Fowles, guitarist of the metalcore band Death by Stereo and the rock band The Aquabats
- Marvin Goldstein, pianist and arranger
- Gregg Hale, guitar player of Spiritualized, engineer and producer, owner of Lincoln Street Sound Studio
- Dinah Jane Hansen, member of the girl group Fifth Harmony
- Eric Herman, children's music entertainer, best known for viral video hit "The Elephant Song"
- Herrey's, Swedish boyband who won the Eurovision Song Contest 1984 with the song "Diggi-Loo Diggi-Ley"
- Christian Jacobs, lead singer of The Aquabats and co-creator of the children's television series Yo Gabba Gabba!
- The Jets, 1980s pop group
- Arthur Kane, of The New York Dolls
- Kaskade, American deep house DJ
- Gladys Knight, Rock and Roll Hall of Famer
- Chad Larson, bassist and co-founder of The Aquabats
- Jon Peter Lewis, singer/songwriter, finalist on American Idol (season 3), contestant on The Voice
- Jon Schmidt, pianist with The Piano Guys
- Tony Martin
- The Tabernacle Choir at Temple Square, Orchestra at Temple Square, Bells on Temple Square, and Temple Square Chorale – the official music groups on Temple Square
- The Moth & the Flame, rock band from Provo, Utah; primary three members are practicing Mormons
- Steven Sharp Nelson, cellist of The Piano Guys
- Serban Nichifor, composer
- Maren Ord
- The Osmonds (Alan Osmond, Donny Osmond, Jay Osmond, Jimmy Osmond, Marie Osmond, Merrill Osmond, and Wayne Osmond)
- Nathan Pacheco, singer
- Mimi Parker, percussionist and singer of Low
- Cove Reber, former singer of Saosin and Mormon in the Middle
- Yuki Saito, Japanese singer
- Wayne Sermon, guitarist for Grammy Award winners Imagine Dragons
- Keala Settle, American actress and singer, notable for her work in The Greatest Showman
- Alex Sharpe, Irish actress and recording artist, former member of Celtic Woman
- Ryan Shupe & the RubberBand, bluegrass/country musician, author of Dream Big
- Alan Sparhawk, guitarist and singer of Low, Retribution Gospel Choir, and The Black-Eyed Snakes
- Garth Smith, pianist & composer who has created a great number of piano arrangements of notable LDS Hymns.
- Lindsey Stirling, hip-hop violinist, reached the quarter-finals of America's Got Talent, 2010
- Chance Thomas, composer of video game music
- Iam Tongi, won season 21 of American Idol
- James Valentine, guitarist for Maroon 5
- Dallon Weekes, bassist/keyboardist for multi-platinum rock band Panic! at the Disco, and singer/songwriter for indie/electronic rock band IDKHow
- Brooke White, top 5 contestant in American Idol (season 7)

=== Dance ===
- Brandon Armstrong, dancer appearing on So You Think You Can Dance and Dancing with the Stars
- Lindsay Arnold, dancer appearing on So You Think You Can Dance and Dancing with the Stars
- Witney Carson, winner of Dancing with the Stars' 19th season
- Chelsie Hightower, ballroom dancer and choreographer
- Derek Hough, 5-time winner of Dancing with the Stars, brother of Julianne Hough
- Sara Webb, professional ballet dancer (1997–2018), principal dancer with Houston Ballet.

== Medicine ==
- Richard F. Daines, New York State Department of Health Commissioner, 2007- 2010
- Russell M. Nelson, (former president of The Church of Jesus Christ of Latter-day Saints) physician, heart surgeon, Director American Board Thoracic Surgeons, Chair Thoracic Surgery Salt Lake Hospital, University Hospital (world renowned) first open heart surgery heart lung support machine under Dr. Gibbon, Mayo Clinic, Philadelphia "Top 20 Most Innovative Surgeons Alive Today"
- Ellis Reynolds Shipp, 1847–1939,.One of the first female doctors west of the Mississippi. Sent to Women's Medical College of Pennsylvania in 1873 by Eliza R. Snow on an endowment from Dr. Willard Richards. Upon return to Salt Lake City, worked with Snow's board to start obstetrics school 1876, trained 660 midwives. went to Michigan for pediatrics under pioneer Victor Vaugh who created American Pediatrics Board, returning created LDS Children's hospital under relief society, bolstered by St. Marks Hospital Salt Lake.
- Willard Richards, 1804-1854 Obstetrician Thompson Infirmary Med School Boston 1835. Apostle 1840 2nd counselor 1847, migrated Salt Lake 1847–9, expedition secretary and medic/surgeon. Opened Deseret (Salt Lake) LDS clinic under Relief Society 1849 SLC. Started Deseret News column on health. Trained midwives, many starting as girls. Treated gold rush miners 1849–50.

== Scientists and inventors ==
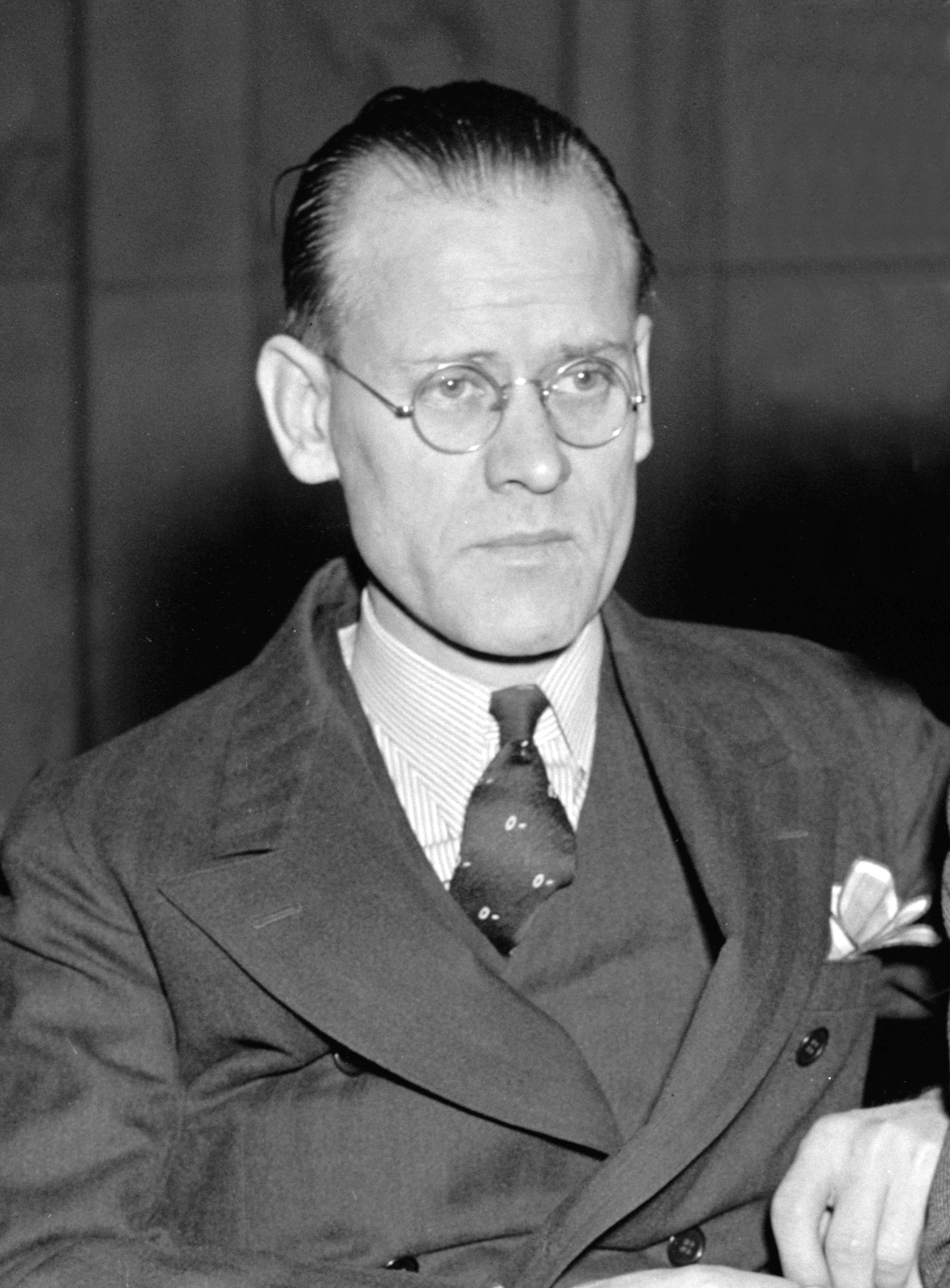
Philo Farnsworth

- David H. Bailey, mathematician
- Nathaniel Baldwin, telephonic headphone inventor
- John Moses Browning, gun designer
- Jonathan Browning, gunsmith, inventor; father of John Moses Browning
- Val A. Browning, gun designer; son of John Moses Browning
- John M. Butler, DNA profiler
- William Clayton, inventor of the "roadometer", an early version of the modern odometer
- Henry Eyring, president of the American Chemical Society (1963), former professor at Princeton University and the University of Utah
- Philo T. Farnsworth, inventor of the cathode ray television
- Harvey Fletcher, inventor of stereophonic sound and the hearing aid.
- H. Tracy Hall, invented synthetic diamonds
- Robert B. Ingebretsen, co-developed digital audio recording; Academy Award recipient
- Don Leslie Lind, astronaut
- Yukihiro Matsumoto, chief designer of Ruby programming language
- Orson Pratt, mathematician and co-inventor of the "roadometer"
- Alvino Rey, invented the pedal steel guitar
- James LeVoy Sorenson, inventor
- James E. Talmage, scholar, scientist

== Military ==
=== Commanders ===
- Donald Burdick, United States Army major general (retired)
- Bruce Carlson, USAF general (retired) and LDS General Authority
- Joseph W. Dailey, fifth Sergeant Major of the Marine Corps
- John R. Lasater, USAF brigadier general (retired) and LDS general authority
- John R. Massaro, eighth Sergeant Major of the Marine Corps
- Robert C. Oaks, USAF general (retired) and LDS general authority
- Brent Scowcroft, USAF lieutenant general (retired); National Security Advisor under Presidents Gerald Ford and George H. W. Bush; co-wrote Bush's autobiography
- Paul A. Yost Jr., USCG admiral (retired)
- Richard W. Young, United States Army brigadier general and commander of the 65th Field Artillery Brigade in France during World War I

=== U.S. Medal of Honor recipients ===
- Mervyn S. Bennion, U.S. Navy, World War II (awarded posthumously)
- David B. Bleak, U.S. Army, Korean War
- Leonard C. Brostrom, U.S. Army, World War II (awarded posthumously)
- Sammy L. Davis, U.S. Army, Vietnam War (converted in 2012)
- Bernard F. Fisher, U.S. Air Force, Vietnam War
- Larry L. Maxam, U.S. Marine Corps, Vietnam War (awarded posthumously)
- Edward S. Michael, U.S. Army Air Forces, World War II (converted in 1976)
- Thomas C. Neibaur, U.S. Army, World War I
- Clinton Romesha, U.S. Army, War in Afghanistan
- Junior N. Van Noy, U.S. Army, World War II (awarded posthumously)
- George E. Wahlen, U.S. Navy, World War II

== Politics ==
=== U.S. politicians ===
==== Currently in office ====
===== U.S. Senate =====
- Mike Crapo (R–Idaho)
- Mike Lee (R–Utah)
- John Curtis (R–Utah)

===== U.S. House of Representatives =====
- Mike Simpson (R–Idaho)
- Chris Stewart (R–Utah)
- Burgess Owens (R–Utah)
- Andy Biggs (R–Arizona)

===== Governors =====
- Spencer Cox (R–Utah)

==== Past office holders ====
===== U.S. Senate =====
- Mitt Romney (R-Utah, 2019-2025)
- Bob Bennett (R–Utah, 1993–2010)
- Berkeley Bunker (D–Nevada, 1940–42)
- Howard Cannon (D–Nevada, 1959–83)
- Jake Garn (R–Utah, 1974–93)
- Paula Hawkins (R–Florida, 1981–87)
- William H. King (D–Utah, 1917–41)
- Frank E. Moss (D–Utah, 1959–77)
- Gordon Smith (R–Oregon, 1997–2009)
- Reed Smoot (R–Utah, 1903–33)
- Elbert Duncan Thomas (D–Utah, 1933–51)
- Harry Reid (D–Nevada, 1987–2017)
- Dean Heller (R–Nevada, 2011–2019)
- Jeff Flake (R-Arizona, 2013–2019)
- Orrin Hatch (R-Utah, 1977–2019)
- Larry Pressler (R-South Dakota, 1979–1997)
- Tom Udall (D–New Mexico)

===== U.S. House of Representatives =====
- John Milton Bernhisel (Utah Territory)
- Rob Bishop, (R-Utah, 2003-2021)
- Hamer Budge (R–Idaho, 1951–61)
- Jason Chaffetz (R-Utah, 2009–2017)
- Curt Clawson (R–Florida, 2014–2017)
- John Doolittle (R–California, 1991–2009)
- Eni Faleomavaega, nonvoting delegate (D–American Samoa, 1989–2015)
- Jeff Flake (R–Arizona, 2001–13)
- Jim Gibbons (R–Nevada, 1997–2006)
- George Hansen (R–Idaho, 1965–69, 1975–85)
- Ralph Harding (D–Idaho, 1961–65)
- Cresent Hardy (R–Nevada, 2015–2017)
- Wally Herger (R–California, 1987–2013)
- Ernest Istook (R–Oklahoma, 1993–2007)
- David S. King (D–Utah, 1959–63, 1965–67)
- Buck McKeon (R–California, 1993–2015)
- Howard Nielson (R–Utah, 1983–91)
- Wayne Owens (D–Utah, 1973–75, 1987–93)
- Matt Salmon (R–Arizona, 1995–2001, 2013–2017)
- Norman D. Shumway (R–California, 1979–91)
- Richard Stallings (D–Idaho, 1985–93)
- Richard Swett (D–New Hampshire, 1991–95)
- Morris King Udall (D–Arizona, 1961–91)
- Stewart Udall (D–Arizona, 1955–61)
- Mia Love (R-Utah, 2015–2019)

===== U.S. governors =====
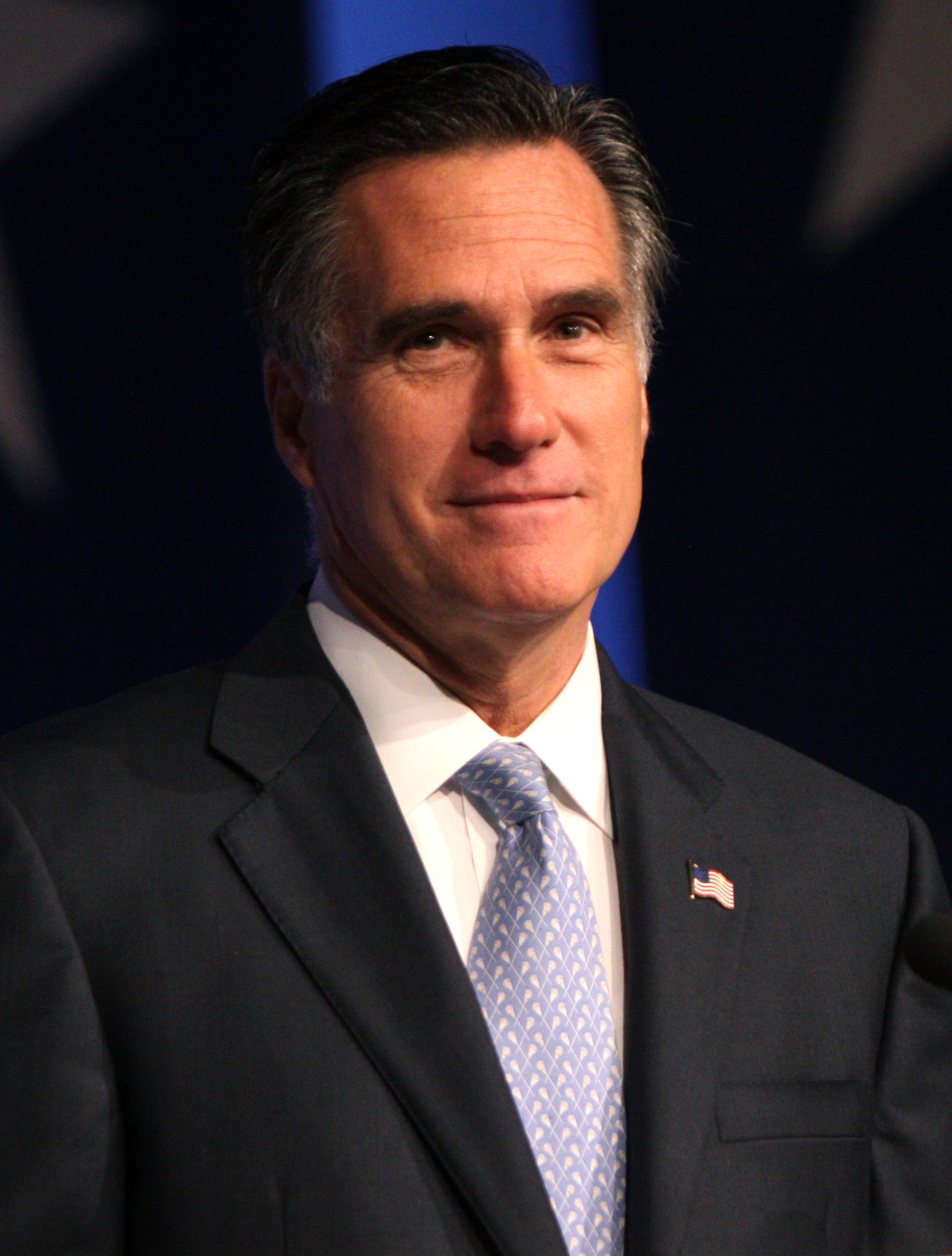
Mitt Romney

- Norman H. Bangerter (R–Utah, 1985–93)
- Henry H. Blood (D–Utah, 1933–41)
- George Dewey Clyde (R–Utah, 1957–65)
- John Christopher Cutler (R–Utah, 1905–09)
- John Evans (D–Idaho, 1977–87)
- Jim Gibbons (R–Nevada, 2007–11)
- Gary Herbert (R-Utah, 2009-2021)
- Jon Huntsman Jr., (R–Utah, 2005–09); 2012 Republican presidential candidate
- Mike Leavitt (R–Utah, 1993–2003)
- Charles R. Mabey (R–Utah, 1921–25)
- Scott M. Matheson (D–Utah, 1977–85)
- Herbert B. Maw (D–Utah, 1941–49)
- Evan Mecham (R–Arizona, 1987–88)
- Calvin L. Rampton (D–Utah, 1965–77)
- George Romney (R–Michigan, 1963–69)
- Mitt Romney (R–Massachusetts, 2003–07), 2012 Republican presidential nominee
- William Spry (R–Utah, 1909–17)
- Olene S. Walker (R–Utah, 2003–05)
- Heber Manning Wells (R–Utah, 1896–1905), first governor of the state of Utah
- Arnold Williams (D–Idaho, 1945–1947)
- Brigham Young (1851–58), first governor of Utah Territory

===== Cabinet officers, ambassadors and senior administration officials =====
- Terrel Bell, U.S. Secretary of Education (1981–85)
- Ezra Taft Benson, U.S. Secretary of Agriculture (1953–61)
- Angela Buchanan, Treasurer of the United States (1981–83)
- J. Reuben Clark, Undersecretary of State, U.S. Ambassador to Mexico (1930–1933)
- Larry Echo Hawk, Assistant Secretary of the Interior for Indian Affairs (2009–12)
- David M. Kennedy, U.S. Secretary of Treasury (1969–71); U.S. Ambassador to NATO (1972–73)
- Mike Leavitt, U.S. Secretary of Health and Human Services (2005–09); Administrator of the Environmental Protection Agency
- Rex Lee, U.S. Solicitor General (1981–85)
- James Henry Moyle, U.S. Assistant Secretary of Treasury (1917–21), U.S. Commissioner of Customs (1933–39), Special Assistant to U.S. Secretary of Treasury (1939–40)
- Gregory J. Newell, U.S. Assistant Secretary of State (1982–85), United States Ambassador to Sweden (1985–1989)
- Jody Olsen, Peace Corps Director (2018-)
- Ivy Baker Priest, Treasurer of the United States (1953–61)
- George Romney, U.S. Secretary of Housing and Urban Development (1969–73)
- D. Nathan Sheets, Under Secretary of the Treasury for International Affairs (2014–2017)
- William Spry, Commissioner of the General Land Office (1921–29)
- Richard Swett, U.S. Ambassador to Denmark (1998–99)
- Matthew H. Tueller, U.S. Ambassador to Yemen (2014–present); U.S. Ambassador to Kuwait (2011–2014)
- Stewart Udall, U.S. Secretary of the Interior (1961–69)
- Bruce Babbitt, U.S. Secretary of the Interior (1993–2001)

===== Other American politicians =====
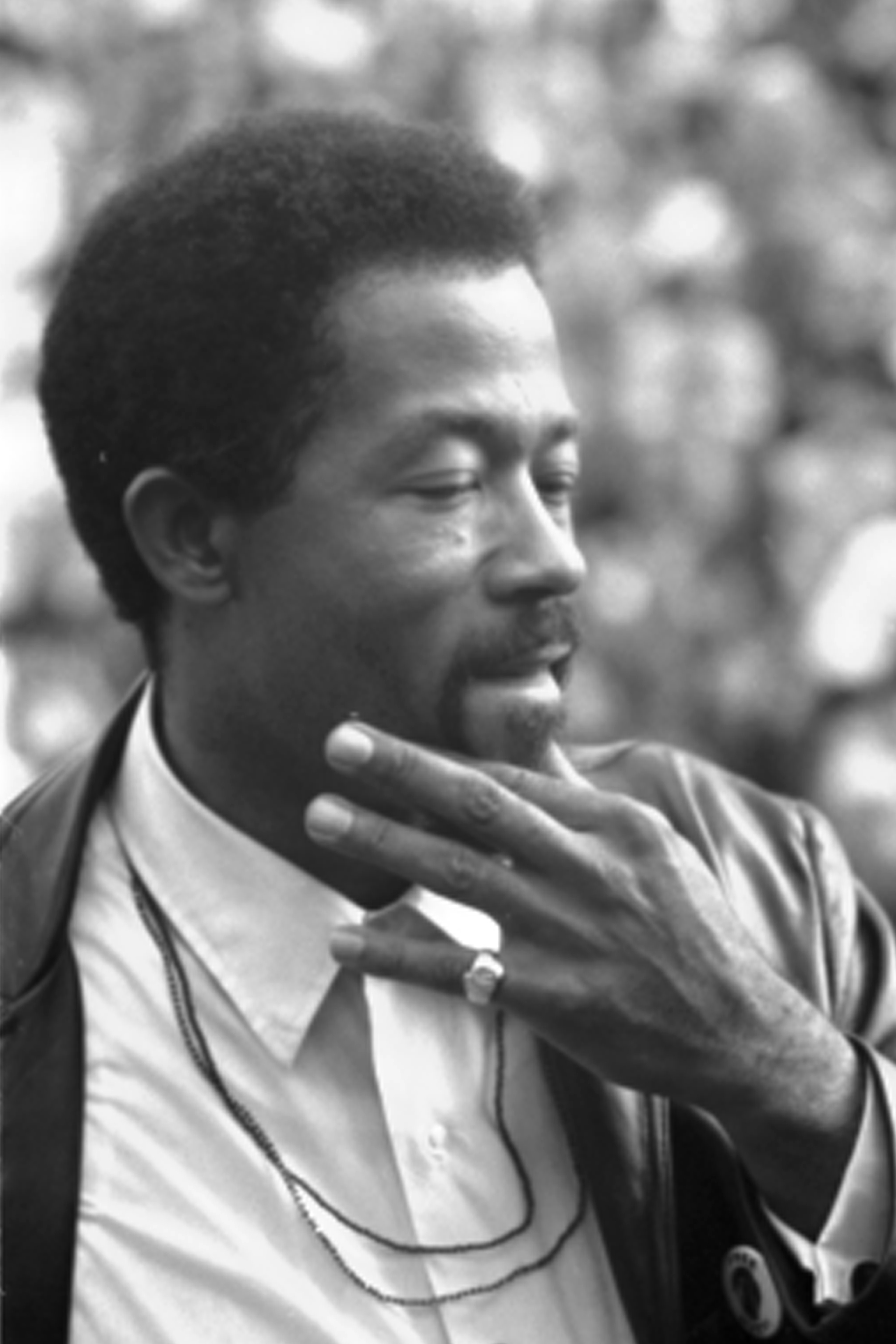
Eldridge Cleaver

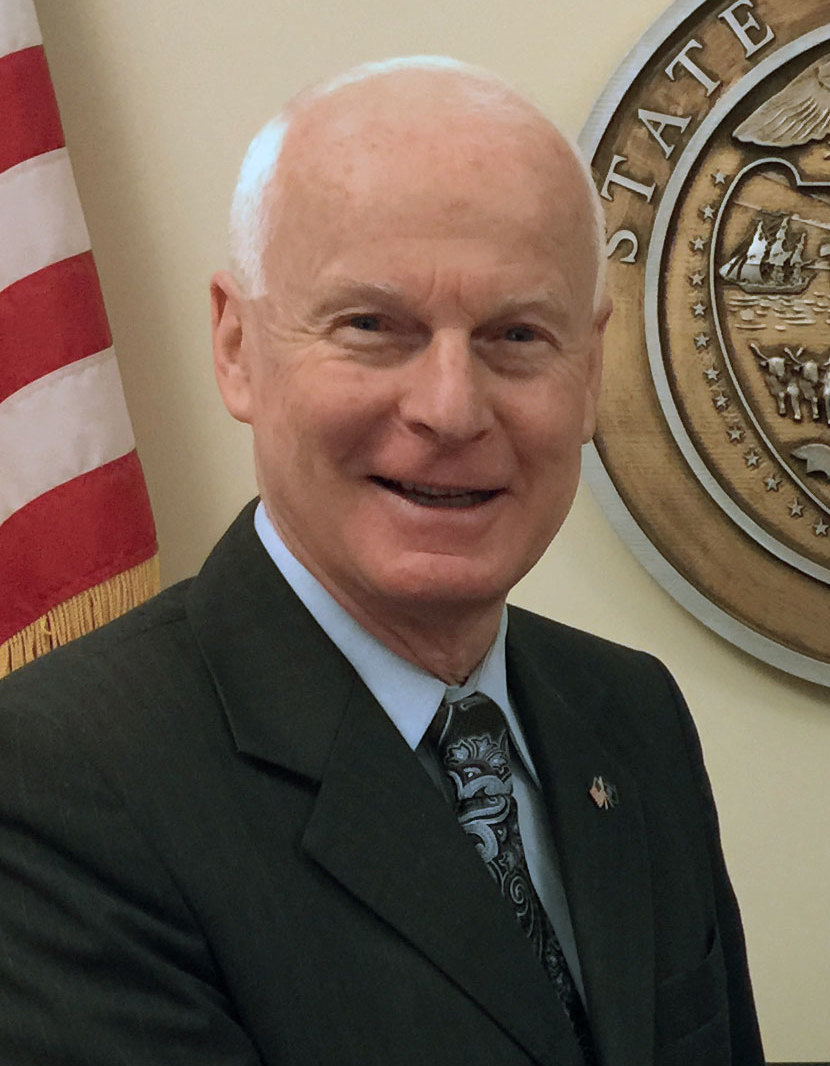
Dennis Richardson

- Chief Washakie, leader in the Shoshone tribe.
- Eldridge Cleaver, Black Panther leader, author of Soul on Ice, candidate for President (1968) for Peace and Freedom Party
- Doug Coleman, member of the Arizona House of Representatives (R) (2013–incumbent)
- Brent Coles, mayor of Boise, Idaho
- Marriner Stoddard Eccles, chairman of Federal Reserve Board (1934–48)
- Becky Edwards (politician), member of the Utah House of Representatives
- Anne Neu, member of the Minnesota House of Representatives (2017–incumbent)
- David B. Haight, mayor of Palo Alto, California
- Joseph Smith, mayor of Nauvoo, Illinois and 1844 independent candidate for U.S. president
- James Strang, member of the Michigan House of Representatives (1853–56)
- Dennis Richardson, Oregon Secretary of State (2017–2019), former State Representative, and 2014 Governor candidate.
- Arthur F. Miles, member of the Utah State Legislature.
- Tom Butler, former member of the Oregon House of Representatives.
- Rich Vial, former Deputy Oregon Secretary of State, Nonpartisan candidate for Secretary of State in 2020
- Greg Smith, member of the Oregon House of Representatives

=== Politicians outside the United States ===
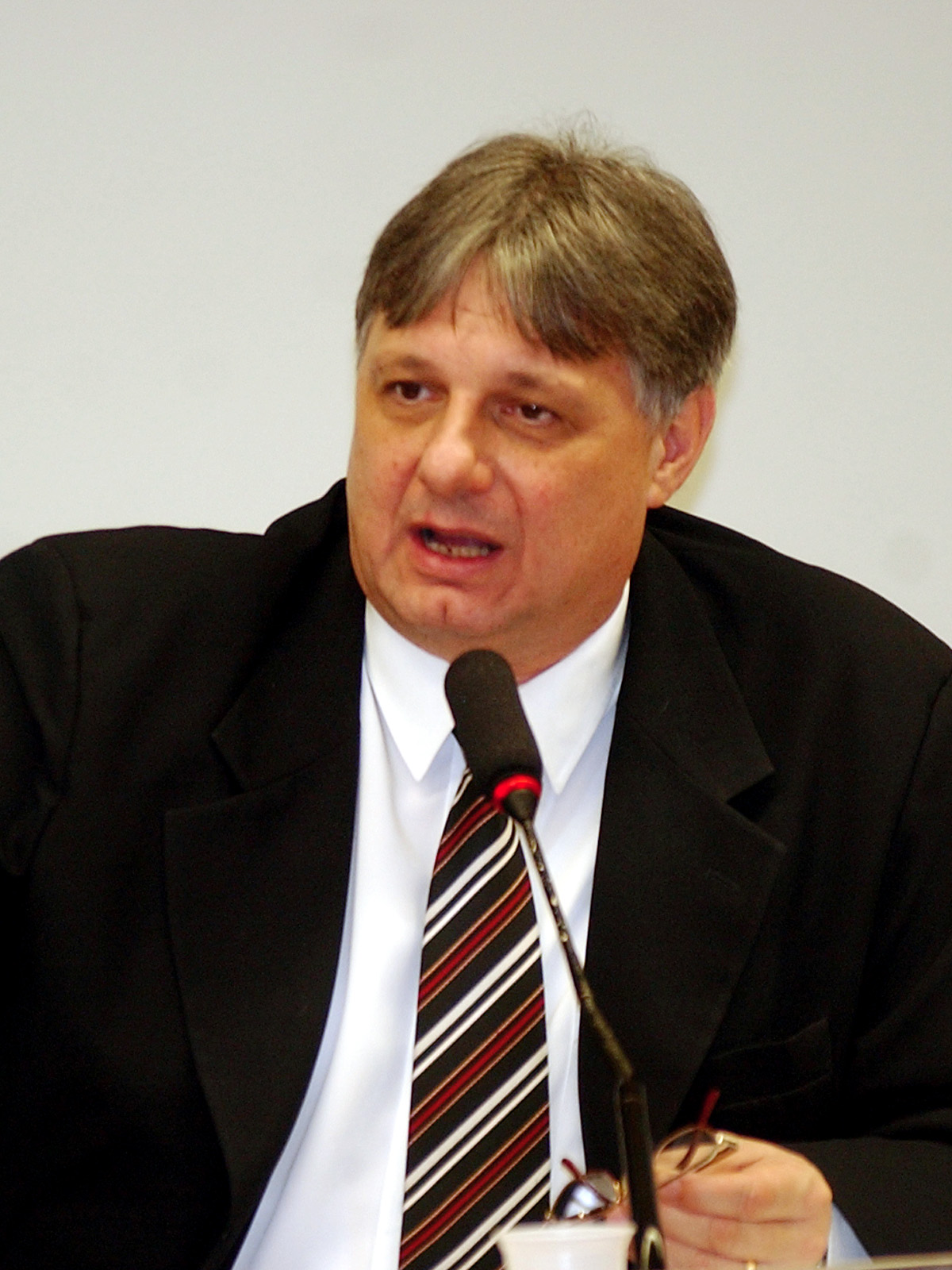
Moroni Bing Torgan

- Brian Adam, Scottish National Party member of the Scottish Parliament for Aberdeen Donside (1999–2013)
- Cindy Ady, member of the Legislative Assembly of Alberta for the Progressive Conservatives (2001–2012)
- Jack Ady, member of the Legislative Assembly of Alberta for the Progressive Conservatives (1986-1997)
- Charles Anderson, member of the Legislative Assembly of Alberta for the Progressive Conservatives (1979-1982)
- Rob Anderson, member of the Legislative Assembly of Alberta, for the Wildrose Alliance (2008–2015)
- Jacinda Ardern, Prime Minister of New Zealand (2017–2023), although renounced Mormonism before taking office
- Gary Bikman, member of the Legislative Assembly of Alberta for the Progressive Conservatives (2012-2015)
- John Horne Blackmore, Leader of the Social Credit Party of Canada (1935–44) and member of the Parliament of Canada for Lethbridge (1935–58)
- Alvin Bullock, member of the Legislative Assembly of Alberta for the Social Credit Party (1967-1971)
- Ben Couch, Minister of Māori Affairs and Minister of Police in the Third National Government, 1975-1984, New Zealand
- Amor De Cosmos, served as Premier of British Columbia, 1872-1874; and represented the riding of Victoria as a Liberal in Canadian Parliament, 1872-1882, Canada
- David Dorward, member of the Legislative Assembly of Alberta, for the Progressive Conservatives, 2012-2015 Canada
- Keith Everitt, was a member of the Legislative Assembly of Alberta for the Social Credit (1959-1971)
- Luis Alberto Ferrizo, member of the Congress of Uruguay
- Nathan Gill, UKIP and Brexit Party member of the European Parliament for Wales (2014–2020)
- James Hansen, member of the Legislative Assembly of Alberta for the Social Credit (1935-1940)
- Grant Hill, former member of the Parliament of Canada for Macleod (1994–2004)
- Jim Hillyer, member of the Parliament of Canada for Lethbridge (2011–2016)
- Paul Hinman, member of the Legislative Assembly of Alberta, for the Wildrose Alliance, (2005–2012); party leader, 2005–2009; served most recently as the party leader of the Wildrose Independence Party of Alberta, (2020-2022)
- Ted Hinman, member of the Legislative Assembly of Alberta, for the Social Credit, (1952-1967, 1971-1975); served as minister of municipal affairs (1954-1955) and provincial treasurer (1955-1964)
- Grant Hunter, member of the Legislative Assembly of Alberta, for the United Conservative Party (2015–)
- Keiko Itokazu, member of the Japanese Diet (2004–)
- Broyce Jacobs, member of the Legislative Assembly of Alberta, for the Progressive Conservative, (2001–04, 2008–12)
- Kim Ho Jik, vice-minister of education in the administration of South Korean president Syngman Rhee
- Jeffrey Max Jones, former National Action Party Senator representing Chihuahua, Mexico (2000–06)
- Rahui Katene, New Zealand MP (2008–2011)
- Stephen Kerr, Conservative member of the British House of Commons for Stirling (2017–2019)
- Gordon Kesler, member of the Legislative Assembly of Alberta for the WCC (1982)
- 'Etuate Lavulavu, member of the Legislative Assembly of Tonga
- Lee Leavitt, member of the Legislative Assembly of Alberta, for the Social Credit (1952-1955, 1963-1971)
- Roy S. Lee, member of the Legislative Assembly of Alberta for the Social Credit (1940-1963)
- Todd Loewen, member of the Legislative Assembly of Alberta, for the United Conservative Party (2015-)
- Solon Earl Low, Leader of the Social Credit Party of Canada (1944–61), member of the Parliament of Canada for Peace River (1945–58) and member of the Legislative Assembly of Alberta (1935–45) and Provincial Treasurer (1937–44)
- Donald Hugh Mackay served as the Mayor of Calgary (1950-1959)
- Stuart Meha, Māori leader
- Greg Melchin, was a member of the Legislative Assembly of Alberta for the Progressive Conservatives (1997-2008)
- Douglas Miller member of the Legislative Assembly of Alberta for the Social Credit (1967-1975)
- Bill Payne was a member of the Legislative Assembly of Alberta for the Progressive Conservatives (1979-1993)
- Lawrence Peterson, was a member of the Legislative Assembly of Alberta for the United Farmers (1921-1930)
- Terry Rooney, former Labour member of the British House of Commons for Bradford North (1990–2010)
- Sam Rushworth, Labour member of the British House of Commons for Bishop Auckland (2024–)
- David Rutley, Conservative member of the British House of Commons for Macclesfield (2010–)
- Yeah Samake, candidate in the coup-interrupted 2012 Malian presidential election
- Frederik Samuelsen, member of the Danish Rigsdag (1906–18)
- Joseph Schow, member of the Legislative Assembly of Alberta, for the United Conservative Party (2019-)
- Gordon Shrake, member of the Legislative Assembly of Alberta for the Progressive Conservatives (1982-1993); also served as a City of Calgary Alderman (1971-1982)
- Anthony Maitland Stenhouse, was a member of the Legislative Assembly of British Columbia representing the riding of Comox (1886-1887)
- Bryce Stringam, was an Independent member of the Legislative Assembly of Alberta (1955-1959)
- George Stringam, was a member of the Legislative Assembly of Alberta for the United Farmers (1921-1935)
- Nathan Eldon Tanner, was a member of the Legislative Assembly of Alberta (1935–52); speaker of the legislature (1936–37) and minister of lands and mines
- John Thompson, member of the Legislative Assembly of Alberta for the Progressive Conservatives (1975-1986)
- Randy Thorsteinson, is leader of the Reform Party of Alberta (2016-); was formerly leader of the Alberta Alliance (2003-2005), and the Social Credit Party (1993-1999)
- Moroni Bing Torgan, former member of the Brazilian Chamber of Deputies (1991–95, 1999–2003)
- Puti Tipene Watene, New Zealand MP (1963–67) and trade unionist
- James H. Walker, was an Independent member of the Legislative Assembly of Alberta (1940-1944)
- Hans Wight, was a member of the Legislative Assembly of Alberta for the Social Credit (1935-1937)
- Craig Whittaker, Conservative member of the British House of Commons for Calder Valley (2010–)
- John William Woolf, was a member of the Legislative Assembly of Alberta for the Liberal Party (1905-1912)
- Martin Woolf, was a member of the Legislative Assembly of Alberta for the Liberal Party (1912-1921)

==== Royalty ====
- ʻElisiva Fusipala Vahaʻi, Tongan princess
- Prince Ata, Tongan prince

== Church leaders ==
=== Presidents of the LDS Church (largest denomination) ===
1. Joseph Smith, Church Founder, also mayor of Nauvoo, Illinois
2. Brigham Young, also Utah territorial Governor
3. John Taylor, also member of Utah Territorial Legislature
4. Wilford Woodruff, also member of Utah Territorial Legislature
5. Lorenzo Snow, also member of Utah Territorial Legislature
6. Joseph F. Smith, also member of Utah Territorial Legislature
7. Heber J. Grant, also member of Utah Territorial Legislature
8. George Albert Smith
9. David O. McKay
10. Joseph Fielding Smith
11. Harold B. Lee
12. Spencer W. Kimball
13. Ezra Taft Benson, also U.S. Secretary of Agriculture
14. Howard W. Hunter
15. Gordon B. Hinckley, also Presidential Medal of Freedom Recipient
16. Thomas S. Monson
17. Russell M. Nelson
18. Dallin H. Oaks, also Utah Supreme Court Justice

=== Presidents of the Community of Christ ===
1. Joseph Smith III
2. Frederick M. Smith
3. Israel A. Smith
4. W. Wallace Smith
5. Wallace B. Smith
6. W. Grant McMurray
7. Stephen M. Veazey
8. Stassi D, Cramm

=== Presidents of the Fundamentalist Church of Jesus Christ of Latter-Day Saints ===
1. J. Leslie Broadbent
2. John Y. Barlow
3. Joseph White Musser
4. Charles Zitting
5. Leroy S. Johnson
6. Rulon Jeffs
7. Warren Jeffs
8. William E. Jessop (appointed successor): Merril Jessop (de facto leader)
