= Arthur Miles =

Arthur Miles may refer to:

- Arthur Miles (country singer) (1904–1984), American singer of cowboy songs
- Arthur Miles (musician, born 1949) (1949–2024), American blues, jazz, and R&B musician
- Arthur Miles (footballer) (1888–1960), Australian rules footballer
- Arthur F. Miles (1866–1953), American educator and politician
