= J. Kirk Richards =

American artist (born 1976)

Joel Kirk Richards (born 1976) is an American artist who specializes in Judeo-Christian themes.

Richards was raised in Provo, Utah. He studied at Brigham Young University under Bruce Smith, Hagen Haltern, Gary Barton, James Christensen, Wulf Barsch and Joe Ostraff. He served a two-year mission for the Church of Jesus Christ of Latter-day Saints (LDS Church) in Italy. He later studied under Patrick Devonas in New Jersey.

Richards and his wife Amy Tolk are the parents of four children.

Much of Richards's work focuses on the life of Jesus. Another of his works is "The Carriers", which relates to the rescue of the Martin Handcart Company.

Richards's images were included in Helen Whitney’s 2007 PBS Frontline documentary entitled "The Mormons". Publications that have used Richards's artwork include the Ensign and Liahona magazines, BYU Studies, and the interdenominational Upper Room magazine.

Richards's work has been shown at the Springville Museum of Art; the Renaissance Center Juried Show in Nashville, Tennessee; the Provo Arts Council Freedom Festival Fine Art Exhibit; the Bountiful/Davis Art Center; at Southern Virginia University as part of its Annual Shenandoah Invitational Art Show; at the Robert N. & Peggy Sears Dixie State Invitational Art Shows in St. George, Utah; and the Museum of Church History and Art.
