= Rowena Bright =

Australian alpine skier

Personal information
- Nationality: Australia
- Born: 7 May 1980 (age 45) Sydney, Australia

Sport
- Sport: Alpine skiing
- Event(s): Slalom, Alpine combined

Rowena Bright (born 7 May 1980) is an Australian alpine skier. She competed in two events at the 2002 Winter Olympics.

== Biography ==
Bright comes from Cooma, New South Wales, is a Mormon and a member of the Church of Jesus Christ of Latter-day Saints. Her family had joined the Church some years earlier. She watched the 1984 Summer Olympics with her mother, inspiring her to become an Olympian. Bright started skiing at school when she was eleven years old. After joining a training provider in Australia, Bright earned sponsorship, allowing her to take part in competitions outside of Australia. Despite breaking her ankle in training, she achieved a high enough standard in a qualifying event for the Olympics. Prior to the 2002 Winter Olympics, Bright became a member of the ski team at the University of Utah.

As of 2002, Bright was one of five members of The Church of Jesus Christ of Latter-Day Saints to compete at the Olympics, and the first from Australia. Her sister, Torah, has also represented Australia at the Winter Olympics.

== See also ==
- List of Latter Day Saints
