= Luis Alberto Ferrizo =

Uruguayan politician (born 1951)

Luis Alberto Ferrizo (born 1951) was a member of the Congress of Uruguay starting in 1989. Prior to that he had been a member of the Flores Department Council starting in 1971.

Ferrizo is a member of the Church of Jesus Christ of Latter-day Saints (LDS Church). He was baptized a member of the LDS Church in 1963. He served as the first president of the church's Durazno Uruguay Stake starting in 1980 and later served as a Regional Representative of the Twelve.

== Sources ==
- listing of Ferrizo's office
- Deseret Morning News Church Almanac, 2008 edition, p. 497
- Nestor Curbelo, "Luis Alberto Ferrizo", Tambuli, September 1991, p. 46.
