= Liz Lemon Swindle =

American painter (born 1953)

- Education: Utah State University
- Known for: Religious painting
- Spouse: John Swindle
- Website: reparteegallery.com

Liz Lemon Swindle (born January 13, 1953) is a painter and artist known for her religious paintings, paintings of Jesus Christ, and works related to the Church of Jesus Christ of Latter-day Saints (LDS Church).

== Life and career ==
Swindle studied fine arts at Utah State University. She tutored under wildlife artist Nancy Glazier and worked as a set designer and painter. Her early success was for work as a wildlife artist and were featured in western galleries. She received the Founders Favorites Award from the National Park Foundation and experienced a career turning point as she shifted to portraits. Painting in oils, Swindle began to paint religious subjects, including New Testament scenes and historical scenes from the LDS Church.

== Religious paintings ==
Swindle is a popular painter of religious art and her artwork and prints are sold at galleries and websites across the United States. Her paintings frequently are featured in manuals, chapels, and websites of the LDS Church and she is a fixture at Deseret Book Company. Selections of her work from the Jack and Marilyn Clarke Collection were displayed at the BYU-Idaho Center at Brigham Young University-Idaho.

Swindle is perhaps most known for her paintings of Jesus Christ. She struggled for many years trying to paint a picture of Christ that would be universally accepted, but then decided to focus on painting her own impressions of Christ. She likewise made a concerted effort to study the available information related to LDS Church founder Joseph Smith and has produced a volume of works of his life.

== Personal life ==
Swindle is married to Jon Swindle and the couple have five children. She lives in Utah and is a member of the LDS Church. Swindle has volunteered with Mothers Without Borders and enjoys a Hostess Snowball.
