= Giovanna Lacerti =

Italian artist

Giovanna Lacerti (born 1935) is an Italian artist. Lacerti is a Latter-day Saint.

== Sources ==
- Short bio on European artists
- Terryl L. Givens. People of Paradox: A History of Mormon Culture. (Oxford: University Press, 2007) p. 338.
- Oman, Richard G. (1992), "Artists, Visual", in Ludlow, Daniel H (ed.), Encyclopedia of Mormonism, New York: Macmillan Publishing, pp. 70–73, ISBN 0-02-879602-0, OCLC 24502140
