= Moroni Torgan =

Brazilian politician

Moroni Bing Torgan
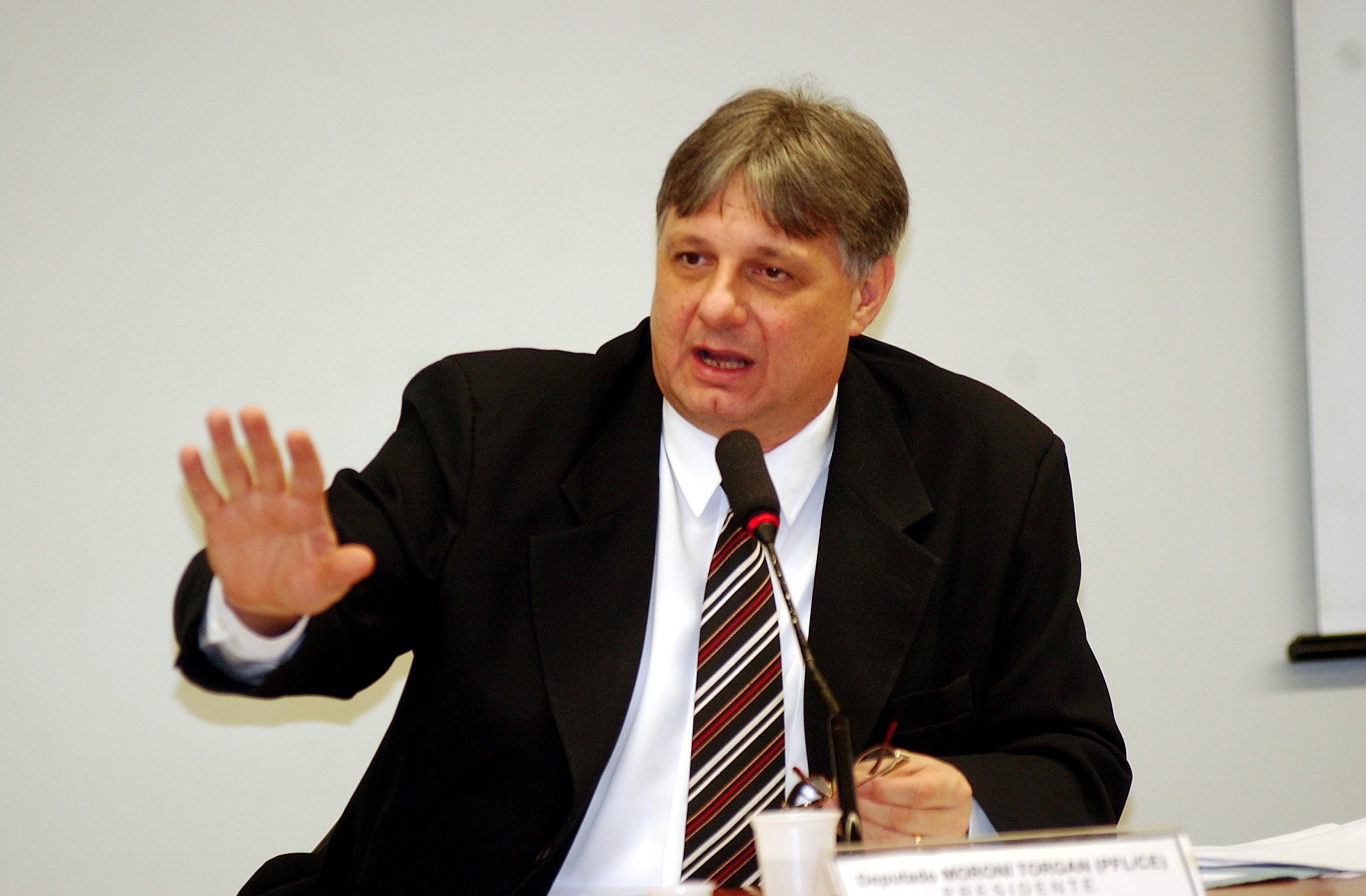
- Moroni Torgan in 2006

Member of the Chamber of Deputies
- In office 2003–2019
- Constituency: Ceará

Personal details
- Born: October 6, 1956 (age 68); Porto Alegre, Brazil

Moroni Bing Torgan (born October 6, 1956) is a Brazilian politician and a member of the National Chamber of Deputies. As of 2001, he was the only Latter-day Saint serving in Brazil's congress.

== Biography ==
Torgan is from Porto Alegre. His great-grandmother on his mother's side was among the first members of the LDS branches in Brazil in 1938. Torgan grew up primarily in the Brazilian state of Rio Grande do Sul and graduated from the Federal University of Rio Grande do Sul.

Prior to his election to the National Congress, Torgan served as president of the Fortaleza Brazil Stake from 1985 to 1991.

Torgan served a mission for the Church of Jesus Christ of Latter-day Saints (LDS Church) in a mission based in São Paulo. His mission president was Saul Messias.

Prior to entering politics, Torgan was a Brazilian federal police officer in Ceará state. In 1987, he was appointed secretary of public security for this state, in which he served until he was elected to Brazil's congress in 1991.

Torgan is married to the former Rosa Caldas. As of 1989 they had two sons, Mosiah and Jared.

Torgan served in the congress of Brazil from 1991 to 1995. In 1995, he was elected vice governor of Ceará. He later served in the Brazilian congress again from 1999 to 2003 and from 2003 to 2007.

In 2009, Torgan was called to serve as president of the Portugal Lisbon Mission of the LDS Church. On March 31, 2012, Torgan was called as an area seventy of the church. At times, Torgan has served in other positions in the LDS Church, including as a bishop and as a counselor to the president of the Brazilia Brazil Mission.

In October 2012, Torgan placed fourth in the election for Mayor of Fortaleza, CE, Brazil.
