= Frederik Samuelsen =

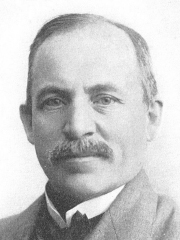
Frederik Ferdinand Samuelsen picture

Frederik Ferdinand Samuelsen (1865–1929) was a member of the Danish Rigsdag, a member of the city council in Aarhus, Denmark, and a convert to the Church of Jesus Christ of Latter-day Saints (LDS Church) who later immigrated to the United States.

Samuelsen was born in Copenhagen. Samuelsen was trained as a locksmith and machinist. In 1889 he moved to Aarhus. In 1890 he married Marie Marianne Florentine Jensen. They eventually had five children. In 1892 Samuelsen and his wife joined the LDS Church.

From 1900 to 1917 Samuelsen served as a member of the Aarhus City council. From 1906 to 1918 he served for several terms as a member of the Rigsdag. His election was opposed by the local Lutheran clergy due to his religious beliefs. Samuelsen was the first Latter-day Saint to serve in a national legislature besides that of the United States.

In 1908, Samuelsen managed to get included in the funeral regulation law allowances for Mormon elders to conduct funerals and even to do so in the funeral chapels. In 1912, he vocally spoke out against planned bans on Mormon missionaries in Denmark and was successful in getting it stopped. Then in 1913, by his bold challenging of the false claims that Mormon missionaries were part of the trade of white slavery, he got those accusations halted as well.

During the First World War, Samuelsen served as president of the Aarhus District of the LDS Church. In 1919, Samuelsen was released as president of the Aarhus District and moved to Utah, where he settled in Salt Lake City.

== Sources ==
- Andrew Jenson, Latter-day Saint Biographical Encyclopedia, vol. 3, p. 707
