= Arthur Miles (footballer) =

Australian rules footballer

Personal information
- Full name: Arthur Bernard Miles
- Born: 19 February 1888; Carlton, Victoria
- Died: 7 August 1960 (aged 72); Sandringham, Victoria
- Original team: St Kilda Trades
- Height: 173 cm (5 ft 8 in)
- Weight: 71 kg (157 lb)

Playing career^{1}
Years	Club	Games (Goals)
1907	St Kilda	1 (0)
- ^{1} Playing statistics correct to the end of 1907.

Arthur Bernard Miles (19 February 1888 – 7 August 1960) was an Australian rules footballer who played for the St Kilda Football Club in the Victorian Football League (VFL).
