= Arthur F. Miles =

Arthur F. Miles (1866–1953) was an American educator and politician who served in the Utah State Legislature representing the St. George, Utah area.

Miles was born in London, England in 1866. In 1877, the Miles family converted to the Church of Jesus Christ of Latter-day Saints (LDS Church) The next year, they emigrated to the United States and eventually settled in St. George. In 1888, Miles married Ida Walker.

In the 1890s, the Sunday schools in the LDS Church's four wards in St. George were consolidated and Miles served as assistant superintendent. In 1926, he served a six-month LDS mission in California.

In 1933, the LDS Church determined it could no longer fund the operation of Dixie College. Miles introduced the bill in the legislature for the state of Utah to take over the operation of the college.

One of his daughters married Andrew K. Larson, who became a noted historian of St. George.
