= Wulf Barsch =

American artist

Wulf Erich Barsch von Benedikt
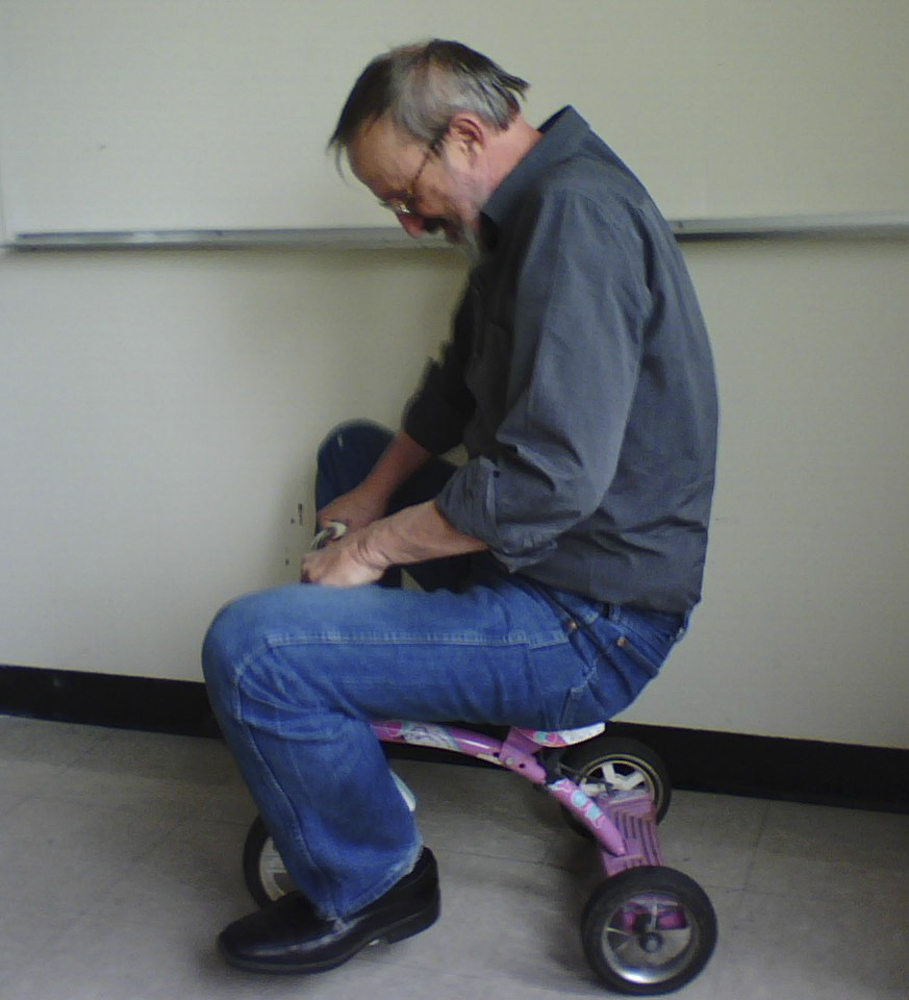
- Wulf demonstrating proper riding technique of a tricycle (BYU, 2007).
- Born: August 27, 1943 (age 82); Bavaria, Germany
- Died: May 20, 2025; Boulder, Utah
- Known for: painting
- Awards: Prix de Rome 1975

Wulf Erich Barsch von Benedikt (born August 27, 1943 in Reudnitz) was an American Latter-day Saint artist and former professor at Brigham Young University (BYU).

== Life ==
Barsch was born in Reudnitz. While his full name was Wulf Erich Barsch von Benedikt, he used Wulf Barsch as his professional name.

He studied under Bauhaus Masters, who were themselves Master Students of Paul Klee and Wassily Kandinsky. He joined the Church of Jesus Christ of Latter-day Saints (LDS Church) in 1966, and subsequently served a mission for the LDS Church in northern California.

Barsch received a master's degree equivalent in Germany from Werkkenschule, Hanover in 1968, a Master of Arts degree from BYU in 1970, and a Master of Fine Arts degree from BYU in 1971, and then joined the faculty at BYU in 1972. Barsch was a leader in the second wave of the Art and Belief Movement. He retired from teaching at BYU in 2010.

In 1975, Barsch won the Rome Prize. His work is recognized as some of the better modern religious art work. His works include "Book of Abraham". In 2011, his work, "The Book of Walking Forth by Day" was included in an exhibit of Mormon art at the Church History Museum in Salt Lake City, Utah.

Wulf Barsch died on May 20, 2025.
