= Cardston (disambiguation) =

Cardston is a town in Alberta, Canada.

Cardston may also refer to:

- Cardston (provincial electoral district)
- Cardston (territorial electoral district)
