= Barry McFarland =

Canadian politician

The Honourable Barry McFarland ECA

MLA for Little Bow
- In office March 5, 1992 – April 23, 2012
- Preceded by: Ray Speaker
- Succeeded by: Ian Donovan

Personal details
- Born: April 22, 1948 (age 78) Carmangay, Alberta
- Party: Progressive Conservative
- Spouse: Mary
- Education: Southern Alberta Institute of Technology
- Occupation: farmer

Barry McFarland ECA (born April 22, 1948) is a Canadian politician and was a Member of the Legislative Assembly of Alberta representing the constituency of Little Bow as a Progressive Conservative.

== Early life ==
McFarland was born and raised near Carmangay. He is a graduate of the business administration program at the Southern Alberta Institute of Technology (SAIT) in Calgary. After graduating, he worked in retail credit for Gulf Canada Resources Limited. Since 1972, McFarland and his wife Mary have operated a dryland grain farm near Carmangay.

== Political career ==
McFarland was first elected in a 1992 by-election, when incumbent Raymond Speaker resigned to run for a federal seat. He won the by-election in a tight race, winning by only 262 votes over the Liberal candidate. It was the closest that the Liberals had come to winning the riding in 70 years. Little Bow had been very conservative even by the standards of rural Alberta, with centre-left parties struggling to win more than 1,000 votes between them. However, it reverted to form, and McFarland would never face another election nearly that close.

He was elected to a sixth term in the 2008 provincial election, receiving 58 percent of the vote. He currently sits on the Standing Committee on the Economy and the Standing Committee on Privileges and Elections, Standing Orders and Printing.

During his five previous terms in office, McFarland sat on numerous committees and chaired the Standing Policy Committee on Agriculture and Municipal Affairs; Alberta Agricultural Research Institute; Standing Policy Committee on Agriculture and Rural Development; Premier's Council in Support of Alberta Families; Prisoner Voting Committee; and Industrial Assessment Review Committee. During his fifth term, McFarland was Associate Minister of Infrastructure and Transportation.

Before entering provincial politics, McFarland was involved in municipal government. He was first elected as a councillor for the County of Vulcan in 1977. Between 1977 and 1992, McFarland served his community in a series of positions, including reeve, school trustee, chair of the Board of Education, and trustee and chair for the Little Bow Auxiliary Hospital.

McFarland was also involved with a number of municipal and agricultural committees, including the Municipal Planning Commission and the Carmangay Seed Cleaning Plant Association.

== Personal life ==
McFarland lives outside Carmangay, Alberta, with his wife, Mary. The couple has four adult children.

He was inducted onto the Palliser Regional Schools Wall of Fame in 2007. His involvement with community groups has included the Carmangay Curling Club, Vulcan Atletika Track Club and local chapters of the Lions Club and the Royal Canadian Legion.

== Election results ==
Alberta provincial by-election, March 5, 1992: Little Bow following the resignation of Raymond Speaker on January 3, 1992
Party	Candidate	Votes	%	±%
Progressive Conservative	Barry McFarland	1,966	35.20	-44.34
Liberal	Donna Graham	1,704	30.51	18.72
New Democratic	Ruth Scalplock	601	10.76	2.09
Social Credit	Al Strom	521	9.33	–
Alliance	Larry Haller	399	7.14	–
Confederation of Regions	Dean Oseen	394	7.06	–
Total		5,585	–	–
Rejected, spoiled and declined		18	–	–
Eligible electors / turnout		9,158	61.18%	–
Progressive Conservative hold		Swing		-31.53
Source(s) Alberta. Chief Electoral Officer (1992). The report of the Chief Electoral Officer on the Little Bow by-election held Thursday, March 5, 1992 (Report). Edmonton: Alberta Legislative Assembly, Office of the Chief Electoral Officer.

1993 Alberta general election results ( Little Bow )		Turnout 66.3%	
Affiliation	Candidate	Votes	%
Progressive Conservative	Barry McFarland	6,709	67.2%
Liberal	Donna Graham	2,866	28.9%
NDP	Rod Lachmuth	382	3.8%

1997 Alberta general election results ( Little Bow )		Turnout 54.0%	
Affiliation	Candidate	Votes	%
Progressive Conservative	Barry McFarland	6,726	69.5%
Liberal	Alida Hess	2.075	21.5%
NDP	Marko Hilgersom	868	9.0%

2001 Alberta general election results ( Little Bow )		Turnout 56.7%	
Affiliation	Candidate	Votes	%
Progressive Conservative	Barry McFarland	6,881	64.8%
Liberal	Arij Langstraat	2,534	23.9%
NDP	Andrea Enes	319	3.0%
Independent	Jon Koch	885	8.3%

2004 Alberta general election: Little Bow
Party	Candidate	Votes	%	±%
Progressive Conservative	Barry McFarland	4,899	54.24%	-10.56%
Liberal	Arij Langstraat	1,961	21.71%	-2.15%
Alberta Alliance	Jay Phin	857	9.49%	–
Social Credit	Brian Cook	554	6.13%	–
Separation	Grant Shaw	433	4.79%	–
New Democratic	Hugh Logie	328	3.63%	0.63%
Total		9,032	–	–
Rejected, spoiled and declined		55	–	–
Eligible electors / turnout		19,835	45.81%	-10.85%
Progressive Conservative hold		Swing		-4.20%
Source(s) Source: "Little Bow Statement of Official Results 2004 Alberta general election" (PDF). Elections Alberta.

2008 Alberta general election results ( Little Bow )		Turnout 43.8%	
Affiliation	Candidate	Votes	%
Progressive Conservative	Barry McFarland	5,144	58%
Liberal	Everett Tanis	1,078	12%
Wildrose Alliance	Kevin Kinahan	2,057	23%
Green	Marie Read	266	3%
NDP	Duane Petluk	322	4%
