= Little Bow =

Defunct provincial electoral district in Alberta, Canada

Coordinates: 50.4°N 113.0°W

Alberta electoral district
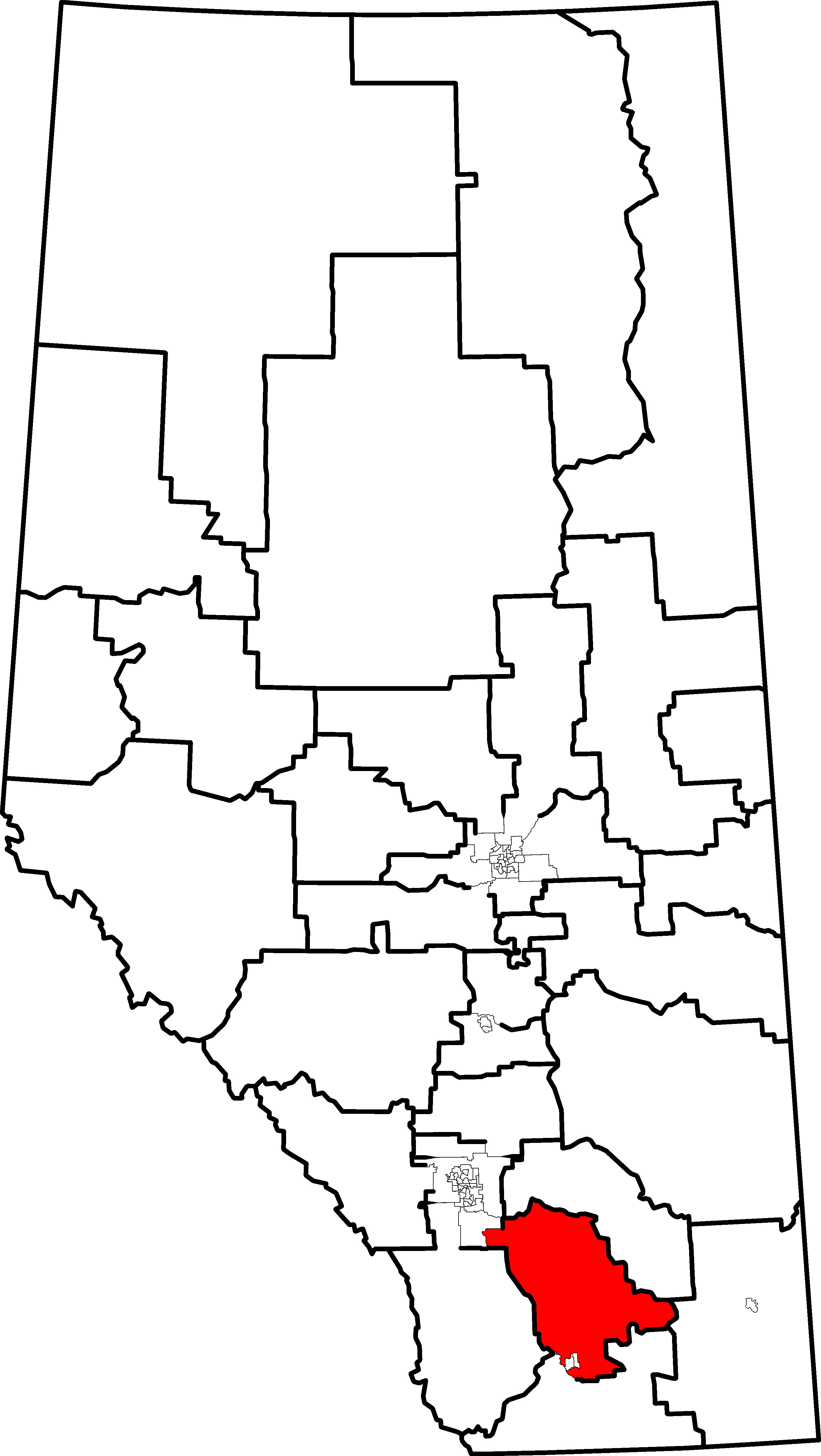
- 2010 boundaries

Defunct provincial electoral district
- Legislature: Legislative Assembly of Alberta
- District created: 1913
- District abolished: 2019
- First contested: 1913
- Last contested: 2015

Little Bow was a provincial electoral district in Alberta, Canada, mandated to return a single member to the Legislative Assembly of Alberta from 1913 to 2019. Throughout its history, this district has been dominated by agricultural activities. Because the area is prone to summer time drought and frequent water rationing, agriculture has been limited to grain crops and cattle ranches. The 2003 BSE crisis, and the subsequent closure of the US border to Canadian cattle, became a major election issue.

The district's major communities, Vulcan, Coalhurst, the Siksika Nation, Arrowwood, Picture Butte and Mossleigh provide service centres for area's agricultural and oil & gas industries.

== History ==
The electoral district was created in the 1913 boundary redistribution from four different districts. It was primarily carved out of Lethbridge District and also took land from the eastern portion of High River, Claresholm and Nanton.

From 1924 to 1956, the district used instant-runoff voting to elect its MLA.

The 2010 electoral boundary re-distribution saw the electoral district change only slightly as a portion of land was moved into the district from Highwood.

The Little Bow electoral district was dissolved in the 2017 electoral boundary re-distribution, and portions of the district would form the Cardston-Siksika and Taber-Warner electoral districts.

=== Boundary history ===
66 Little Bow 2003 boundaries
Bordering districts
North	East	West	South
Strathmore-Brooks	Cypress-Medicine Hat	Livingstone-Macleod and Highwood	Cardston-Taber-Warner, Lethbridge-East and Lethbridge-West
Legal description from the Statutes of Alberta 2003, Electoral Divisions Act.
Starting at the intersection of the east boundary of Sec. 23 in Twp. 21, Rge. 26 W4 and the right bank of the Bow River; then 1. downstream along the right bank to the south boundary of the Siksika Indian Reserve No. 146 in Sec. 6, Twp. 22, Rge. 24 W4; 2. in a northeasterly, southeasterly and southerly direction along the Indian Reserve boundary to the right bank of the Bow River; 3. downstream along the right bank of the Bow River to the right bank of the Oldman River; 4. upstream along the right bank of the Oldman River to the east boundary of Rge. 19, Twp. 10 W4; 5. south along the east boundary to the north boundary of the south half of Sec. 7 in Twp. 9, Rge. 18 W4; 6. east along the north boundary of the south half to the east boundary of the west half of Sec. 7 in the Twp.; 7. south along the east boundary of the west half of Secs. 7 and 6 to the north boundary of the south half of Sec. 6 in the Twp.; 8. east along the north boundary to the east boundary of Sec. 6 in the Twp.; 9. south along the east boundary to the north boundary of Twp. 8; 10. east along the north boundary to the east boundary of Sec. 32 in Twp. 8, Rge. 18 W4; 11. south along the east boundary to the north boundary of the south half of Sec. 33 in the Twp.; 12. east along the north boundary of the south half of Secs. 33 and 34 to the east boundary of the west half of Sec. 34 in the Twp.; 13. south along the east boundary to the north boundary of Sec. 27 in the Twp.; 14. east along the north boundary of Secs. 27 and 26 to the east boundary of the west half of Sec. 26 in the Twp.; 15. south along the east boundary to the north boundary of the south half of Sec. 26 in the Twp.; 16. east along the north boundary to the east boundary of Sec. 26 in the Twp.; 17. south along the east boundary to the north boundary of Sec. 24 in the Twp.; 18. east along the north boundary to the east boundary of Rge. 18 W4; 19. south along the east boundary to the north boundary of the south half of Sec. 19 in Twp. 8, Rge. 17 W4; 20. east along the north boundary of the south half of Secs. 19 and 20 to the east boundary of the west half of Sec. 20 in the Twp.; 21. south along the east boundary to the north boundary of Sec. 17 in the Twp.; 22. east along the north boundary to the east boundary of Sec. 17 in the Twp.; 23. south along the east boundary to the north boundary of the south half of Sec. 16 in the Twp.; 24. east along the north boundary of the south half to the east boundary of the west half of Sec. 16 in the Twp.; 25. south along the east boundary of the west half of Secs. 16 and 9 to the north boundary of Sec. 4 in the Twp.; 26. east along the north boundary to the east boundary of Sec. 4 in the Twp.; 27. south along the east boundary to the north boundary of the south half of Sec. 3 in the Twp.; 28. east along the north boundary of the south half of Sec. 3 to the east boundary of Sec. 3; 29. south along the east boundary to the north boundary of Twp. 7; 30. west along the north boundary to the east boundary of Sec. 34 in Twp. 7, Rge. 18 W4; 31. south along the east boundary of Secs. 34, 27 and 22 to the north boundary of Sec. 15 in the Twp.; 32. west along the north boundary of Secs. 15, 16, 17 and 18 in the Twp. and the north boundary of Secs. 13, 14, 15, 16 and 17 in Twp. 7, Rge. 19 W4 to the east boundary of Sec. 18 in the Twp.; 33. south along the east boundary of Secs. 18, 7 and 6 in the Twp. to the north boundary of Twp. 6; 34. west along the north boundary to the east boundary of Rge. 20 W4; 35. north along the east boundary to the north boundary of Sec. 1 in Twp. 7, Rge. 20 W4; 36. west along the north boundary of Secs. 1, 2, 3, 4, 5 and 6 in the Twp. and the north boundary of Sec. 1 in Twp. 7, Rge. 21 W4 to the east boundary of Sec. 11 in the Twp.; 37. north along the east boundary to the north boundary of Sec. 11 in the Twp.; 38. west along the north boundary of Secs. 11, 10 and 9 in the Twp. to the right bank of Pothole Creek; 39. downstream along the right bank of Pothole Creek to the right bank of the St. Mary River; 40. downstream along the right bank of the St. Mary River to the right bank of the Oldman River; 41. upstream along the right bank (by-passing and excluding the City of Lethbridge) to the east boundary of Sec. 30 in Twp. 10, Rge. 24 W4; 42. north along the east boundary of Secs. 30 and 31 in the Twp. to the north boundary of Twp. 10; 43. west along the north boundary to the east boundary of Sec. 5 in Twp. 11, Rge. 24 W4; 44. north along the east boundary of Secs. 5, 8 and 17 to the north boundary of the south half of Sec. 17 in the Twp.; 45. west along the north boundary of the south half of Secs. 17 and 18 in the Twp. to the east boundary of Rge. 25 W4; 46. north along the east boundary to the right bank of the Little Bow River; 47. upstream along the right bank to the east boundary of Sec. 23 in Twp. 17, Rge. 27 W4; 48. north along the east boundary of Secs. 23, 26 and 35 in the Twp. and the east boundary of Secs. 2, 11, 14, 23, 26 and 35 in Twp. 18, Rge. 27 W4 to the north boundary of Twp. 18 (Highway 23); 49. east along the north boundary of Twp. 18 (Highway 23) to the east boundary of Sec. 2 in Twp. 19, Rge. 26 W4; 50. north along the east boundary of Secs. 2, 11, 14, 23, 26 and 35 in Twps. 19 and 20, Rge. 26 W4 and east boundary of Secs. 2, 11, 14 and 23 in Twp. 21, Rge. 26 W4 to the starting point.
Note:

70 Little Bow 2010 boundaries
Bordering districts
North	East	West	South
Chestermere-Rocky View and Strathmore-Brooks	Cypress-Medicine Hat and Strathmore-Brooks	Highwood and Livingstone-Macleod	Cardston-Taber-Warner, Lethbridge-East and Lethbridge-West
Note: Boundary descriptions were not used in the 2010 redistribution

=== Representation history ===
Members of the Legislative Assembly for Little Bow
Assembly	Years	Member	Party
See High River 1905–1913, Claresholm, Lethbridge District, and Nanton 1909–1913
3rd	1913–1917	James McNaughton	Liberal
4th	1917–1921	James McNaughton	Liberal
5th	1921–1926	Oran McPherson	United Farmers
6th	1926–1930	Oran McPherson	United Farmers
7th	1930–1935	Oran McPherson	United Farmers
8th	1935–1940	Peter Dawson	Social Credit
9th	1940–1944	Peter Dawson	Social Credit
10th	1944–1948	Peter Dawson	Social Credit
11th	1948–1952	Peter Dawson	Social Credit
12th	1952–1955	Peter Dawson	Social Credit
13th	1955–1959	Peter Dawson	Social Credit
14th	1959–1963	Peter Dawson	Social Credit
14th	1963	Vacant	
15th	1963–1967	Raymond Speaker	Social Credit
16th	1967–1971	Raymond Speaker	Social Credit
17th	1971–1975	Raymond Speaker	Social Credit
18th	1975–1979	Raymond Speaker	Social Credit
19th	1979–1982	Raymond Speaker	Social Credit
19th	1982	Raymond Speaker	Independent
20th	1982–1985	Raymond Speaker	Independent
20th	1985	Raymond Speaker	Political Alternative
20th	1985-1986	Raymond Speaker	Representative
21st	1986–1989	Raymond Speaker	Representative
21st	1989	Raymond Speaker	Progressive Conservative
22nd	1989–1992	Raymond Speaker	Progressive Conservative
22nd	1992	Vacant	
22nd	1992-1993	Barry McFarland	Progressive Conservative
23rd	1993–1997	Barry McFarland	Progressive Conservative
24th	1997–2001	Barry McFarland	Progressive Conservative
25th	2001–2004	Barry McFarland	Progressive Conservative
26th	2004–2008	Barry McFarland	Progressive Conservative
27th	2008–2012	Barry McFarland	Progressive Conservative
28th	2012–2014	Ian Donovan	Wildrose
28th	2014–2015	Ian Donovan	Progressive Conservative
29th	2015–2017	Dave Schneider	Wildrose
29th	2017–2019	Dave Schneider	United Conservative
See Cardston-Siksika and Taber-Warner 2019–

The electoral district was created in 1913 in the controversial and scandal ridden redistricting that year. It was created from four different ridings which had a mixture of representation primarily Liberals as well as independents and a Conservative.

Through the first 100 years in the history of this riding, it was only represented by five members of the Legislative Assembly. Historically, voters in this riding tended to favour the candidate more than the party, as shown by Member of the Legislative Assembly (MLA) Raymond Speaker's lengthy term in office.

The first representative elected in 1913 was Liberal candidate James McNaughton. He won re-election with a landslide majority in 1917. McNaughton would be defeated running for his third term in office by United Farmers of Alberta candidate Oran McPherson.

McPherson became Speaker of the Legislature in 1922. He was re-elected to his second term in 1926 defeating McNaughton for the last time and acclaimed to his third term in 1930. Near the end of his third term McPherson went through a scandal-ridden divorce that made front-page headlines. He lost favour with his constituents at a time when the United Farmers lost popularity due to the great depression and the John Edward Brownlee sex scandal.

Little Bow would change representatives in 1935. The riding was swept up in the Social Credit wave that unexpectedly swept through the province. Peter Dawson would easily defeat McPherson in a landslide as Social Credit formed government. Dawson became the second speaker of the Assembly to represent the district in 1937.

Like his predecessors, Dawson would enjoy a long career in the Assembly; he easily won re-election in 1940, 1944, 1948, 1952, 1955 and 1959 without his popular support dropping below 50%. On March 24, 1963, McPherson would die from a heart attack. Little Bow would be left vacant until the 1963 general election held a few months later.

The 1963 election saw Social Credit candidate Raymond Speaker win his first election easily with 64% of the popular vote. He would be re-elected to his second term with a landslide in 1967. After the election Premier Ernest Manning appointed Speaker to the provincial cabinet as a Minister without Portfolio. When Premier Harry Strom came to power in 1968, Speaker remained in cabinet, this time becoming Minister of Social Development.

Speaker would win his third term in office in the 1971 election with a large majority even as his party was swept out of government. He would win re-election as a Social Credit MLA with large majorities in 1975 and 1979 despite the near total collapse of his party.

On October 5, 1982, Speaker, who had been parliamentary leader of the Social Credit caucus and Leader of the Opposition since 1980, had issues with Party leader Rod Sykes. After a motion to disband the fading party failed, Speaker and Walt Buck resigned from Social Credit to run as independents in the 1982 election. He retained his seat with just over 50% of the popular vote.

After the 1982 election, Speaker and Buck tried to form the official opposition instead of the two man NDP caucus. The legislature denied them funding and they didn't get the same budget that the NDP had because they weren't a party. In 1984 they registered the Political Alternative Association with Elections Alberta, which they quickly renamed the Representative Party of Alberta with Speaker as leader.

Speaker took the Representative Party into the 1986 election. It would hold its two seats with Speaker winning his seventh term in office by a 2-to-1 margin. He would abandon the Representative Party to cross the floor to the governing Progressive Conservatives shortly before the 1989 election. Speaker ran for re-election as a Progressive Conservative candidate in 1989 and won his eighth term. He was re-appointed to cabinet by Premier Don Getty as Minister of Municipal Affairs after an 18-year absence.

Speaker vacated his seat in 1992 after being nominated by the Reform Party of Canada to run for a seat in the House of Commons of Canada. After Speaker left, a contentious and divided by-election took place. Progressive Conservative candidate Barry McFarland barely retained this seat for the party. The Liberals came very close to taking back Little Bow, with its best result in 70 years. This stood in marked contrast to past elections in the riding, where centre-left parties struggled to even get 1,000 votes combined.

McFarland was re-elected five times without serious difficulty. He retired in 2012, and Wildrose candidate Ian Donovan took the seat. Donovan crossed the floor to the Tories in 2014. He was narrowly defeated in his bid for a second term by his replacement as Wildrose candidate, Dave Schneider. It was the first time in the riding's history that its member had not been returned for a second term. Because of the Electoral Boundary changes as of the 2019 election, Schneider became the last Member of the Legislative Assembly to represent the Little Bow riding.

== Legislative election results ==
=== 1913 ===
1913 Alberta general election
Party	Candidate	Votes	%	±%
Liberal	James McNaughton	721	52.02%	–
Conservative	John T. MacDonald	339	24.46%	–
Independent	F.A. Bryant	202	14.57%	–
Socialist	Alfred Buddon	124	8.95%	–
Total		1,386	–	–
Rejected, spoiled and declined		N/A	–	–
Eligible electors / turnout		1,772	N/A	–
Liberal pickup new district.				
Source(s) Source: "Little Bow Official Results 1913 Alberta general election". Alberta Heritage Community Foundation.

=== 1917 ===
1917 Alberta general election
Party	Candidate	Votes	%	±%
Liberal	James McNaughton	808	77.39%	25.37%
Socialist	Homer Thomas	236	22.61%	–
Total		1,044	–	–
Rejected, spoiled and declined		N/A	–	–
Eligible electors / turnout		2,909	35.89%	–
Liberal hold		Swing		13.61%
Source(s) Source: "Little Bow Official Results 1917 Alberta general election". Alberta Heritage Community Foundation.

=== 1921 ===
1921 Alberta general election
Party	Candidate	Votes	%	±%
United Farmers	Oran Leo McPherson	1,554	64.48%	–
Liberal	James McNaughton	856	35.52%	-41.88%
Total		2,410	–	–
Rejected, spoiled and declined		N/A	–	–
Eligible electors / turnout		3,258	73.97%	38.08%
United Farmers gain from Liberal		Swing		-12.91%
Source(s) Source: "Little Bow Official Results 1921 Alberta general election". Alberta Heritage Community Foundation.

=== 1926 ===
1926 Alberta general election
Party	Candidate	Votes	%	±%
United Farmers	Oran Leo McPherson	1,367	57.01%	-7.48%
Liberal	James McNaughton	556	23.19%	-12.33%
Conservative	P.M. Patterson	475	19.81%	–
Total		2,398	–	–
Rejected, spoiled and declined		123	–	–
Eligible electors / turnout		3,235	77.93%	3.96%
United Farmers hold		Swing		2.43%
Source(s) Source: "Little Bow Official Results 1926 Alberta general election". Alberta Heritage Community Foundation.

=== 1930 ===
1930 Alberta general election
Party	Candidate	Votes	%	±%
United Farmers	Oran Leo McPherson	Acclaimed	–	–
Total		N/A	–	–
Rejected, spoiled and declined		N/A	–	–
Eligible electors / turnout		N/A	–	–
United Farmers hold		Swing		N/A
Source(s) Source: "Little Bow Official Results 1930 Alberta general election". Alberta Heritage Community Foundation.

=== 1935 ===
1935 Alberta general election
Party	Candidate	Votes	%	±%
Social Credit	Peter Dawson	2,322	66.34%	–
United Farmers	Oran Leo McPherson	704	20.11%	–
Liberal	L.H. Stack	474	13.54%	–
Total		3,500	–	–
Rejected, spoiled and declined		113	–	–
Eligible electors / turnout		4,110	87.91%	–
Social Credit gain from United Farmers		Swing		N/A
Source(s) Source: "Little Bow Official Results 1935 Alberta general election". Alberta Heritage Community Foundation.

=== 1940 ===
1940 Alberta general election
Party	Candidate	Votes	%	±%
Social Credit	Peter Dawson	2,162	51.53%	-14.82%
Independent	E.H. Griffin	2,034	48.47%	–
Total		4,196	–	–
Rejected, spoiled and declined		146	–	–
Eligible electors / turnout		5,048	86.01%	-1.89%
Social Credit hold		Swing		-21.59%
Source(s) Source: "Little Bow Official Results 1940 Alberta general election". Alberta Heritage Community Foundation.

=== 1944 ===
1944 Alberta general election
Party	Candidate	Votes	%	±%
Social Credit	Peter Dawson	1,958	55.14%	3.61%
Independent	J.D. Hagerman	826	23.26%	–
Co-operative Commonwealth	Rudolph Kotkas	767	21.60%	–
Total		3,551	–	–
Rejected, spoiled and declined		18	–	–
Eligible electors / turnout		4,674	76.36%	-9.66%
Social Credit hold		Swing		14.41%
Source(s) Source: "Little Bow Official Results 1944 Alberta general election". Alberta Heritage Community Foundation.

=== 1948 ===
1948 Alberta general election
Party	Candidate	Votes	%	±%
Social Credit	Peter Dawson	1,865	55.08%	-0.06%
Independent	George M. Carson	1,086	32.07%	–
Co-operative Commonwealth	John P. Griffin	435	12.85%	-8.75%
Total		3,386	–	–
Rejected, spoiled and declined		173	–	–
Eligible electors / turnout		4,740	75.08%	-1.27%
Social Credit hold		Swing		-4.44%
Source(s) Source: "Little Bow Official Results 1948 Alberta general election". Alberta Heritage Community Foundation.

=== 1952 ===
1952 Alberta general election
Party	Candidate	Votes	%	±%
Social Credit	Peter Dawson	2,668	65.39%	10.31%
Liberal	Maxwell R. Morrison	1,001	24.53%	–
Co-operative Commonwealth	David S. Smith	411	10.07%	-2.77%
Total		4,080	–	–
Rejected, spoiled and declined		265	–	–
Eligible electors / turnout		6,121	70.99%	-4.10%
Social Credit hold		Swing		8.93%
Source(s) Source: "Little Bow Official Results 1952 Alberta general election". Alberta Heritage Community Foundation.

=== 1955 ===
1955 Alberta general election
Party	Candidate	Votes	%	±%
Social Credit	Peter Dawson	2,481	57.03%	-8.36%
Liberal	Varno Westersund	1,359	31.24%	6.71%
Conservative	Norman Scotney	510	11.72%	–
Total		4,350	–	–
Rejected, spoiled and declined		257	–	–
Eligible electors / turnout		6,123	75.24%	4.26%
Social Credit hold		Swing		-7.53%
Source(s) Source: "Little Bow Official Results 1955 Alberta general election". Alberta Heritage Community Foundation.

=== 1959 ===
1959 Alberta general election
Party	Candidate	Votes	%	±%
Social Credit	Peter Dawson	2,939	64.86%	7.83%
Progressive Conservative	Bernard W. Tonken	989	21.83%	–
Liberal	Donald A. McNiven	603	13.31%	-17.93%
Total		4,531	–	–
Rejected, spoiled and declined		11	–	–
Eligible electors / turnout		5,805	78.24%	3.00%
Social Credit hold		Swing		8.62%
Source(s) Source: "Little Bow Official Results 1959 Alberta general election". Alberta Heritage Community Foundation.

=== 1963 ===
1963 Alberta general election
Party	Candidate	Votes	%	±%
Social Credit	Raymond Albert Speaker	3,368	64.01%	-0.86%
Progressive Conservative	Douglas H. Galbraith	1,245	23.66%	1.83%
Liberal	Arthur W. Ulrich	649	12.33%	-0.97%
Total		5,262	–	–
Rejected, spoiled and declined		24	–	–
Eligible electors / turnout		7,582	69.72%	-8.53%
Social Credit hold		Swing		-1.35%
Source(s) Source: "Little Bow Official Results 1963 Alberta general election". Alberta Heritage Community Foundation.

=== 1967 ===
1967 Alberta general election
Party	Candidate	Votes	%	±%
Social Credit	Raymond Albert Speaker	3,367	68.48%	4.47%
Independent	Arthur W. Ulrich	978	19.89%	–
New Democratic	John K. Head	572	11.63%	–
Total		4,917	–	–
Rejected, spoiled and declined		16	–	–
Eligible electors / turnout		7,413	66.55%	-3.17%
Social Credit hold		Swing		4.12%
Source(s) Source: "Little Bow Official Results 1967 Alberta general election". Alberta Heritage Community Foundation.

=== 1971 ===
1971 Alberta general election
Party	Candidate	Votes	%	±%
Social Credit	Raymond Albert Speaker	3,400	58.53%	-9.95%
Progressive Conservative	John C. Green	2,114	36.39%	–
New Democratic	Edward H. Rodney	295	5.08%	-6.55%
Total		5,809	–	–
Rejected, Spoiled and Declined		11	–	–
Eligible electors / Turnout		7,382	78.84%	12.30%
Social Credit hold		Swing		-13.22%
Source(s) Source: "Little Bow Official Results 1971 Alberta general election". Alberta Heritage Community Foundation.

=== 1975 ===
1975 Alberta general election
Party	Candidate	Votes	%	±%
Social Credit	Raymond Albert Speaker	3,132	57.64%	-0.89%
Progressive Conservative	George McMorris	2,019	37.15%	0.76%
Liberal	Ben Loman	157	2.89%	–
New Democratic	Wayne Doolittle	126	2.32%	-2.76%
Total		5,434	–	–
Rejected, spoiled and declined		11	–	–
Eligible electors / turnout		7,354	74.04%	-4.80%
Social Credit hold		Swing		-0.83%
Source(s) Source: "Little Bow Official Results 1975 Alberta general election". Alberta Heritage Community Foundation.

=== 1979 ===
1979 Alberta general election
Party	Candidate	Votes	%	±%
Social Credit	Raymond Albert Speaker	3,748	65.63%	7.99%
Progressive Conservative	Richard Papworth	1,684	29.49%	-7.67%
New Democratic	Beth Jantzie	236	4.13%	1.81%
Liberal	John W. Fujimargari	43	0.75%	-2.14%
Total		5,711	–	–
Rejected, spoiled and declined		22	–	–
Eligible electors / turnout		8,238	69.59%	-4.45%
Social Credit hold		Swing		7.83%
Source(s) Source: "Little Bow Official Results 1979 Alberta general election". Alberta Heritage Community Foundation.

=== 1982 ===
1982 Alberta general election
Party	Candidate	Votes	%	±%
Independent	Raymond Albert Speaker	3,174	50.09%	–
Progressive Conservative	Cliff Wright	2,144	33.83%	4.35%
Western Canada Concept	Wayne Lawlor	851	13.43%	–
New Democratic	Beth Jantzie	168	2.65%	-1.48%
Total		6,337	–	–
Rejected, spoiled and declined		15	–	–
Eligible electors / turnout		8,168	77.77%	8.17%
Independent notional hold		Swing		-9.94%
Source(s) Source: "Little Bow Official Results 1982 Alberta general election". Alberta Heritage Community Foundation. Raymond Speaker crossed the floor to become an Independent in 1982.

=== 1986 ===
1986 Alberta general election
Party	Candidate	Votes	%	±%
Representative	Raymond Albert Speaker	3,791	63.65%	–
Progressive Conservative	Cliff Wright	1,805	30.31%	-3.53%
Confederation of Regions	Dean Oseen	158	2.65%	–
New Democratic	Christina Tomaschuk	137	2.30%	-0.35%
Liberal	Ben Loman	65	1.09%	–
Total		5,956	–	–
Rejected, spoiled and declined		10	–	–
Eligible electors / turnout		9,604	62.12%	-15.65%
Representative notional hold		Swing		8.55%
Source(s) Source: "Little Bow Official Results 1986 Alberta general election". Alberta Heritage Community Foundation. Raymond Speaker crossed the floor to become a Representative in 1985.

=== 1989 ===
1989 Alberta general election
Party	Candidate	Votes	%	±%
Progressive Conservative	Raymond Albert Speaker	3,907	79.54%	49.23%
Liberal	Elzien Schopman	579	11.79%	10.70%
New Democratic	Keith Ford	426	8.67%	6.37%
Total		4,912	–	–
Rejected, spoiled and declined		7	–	–
Eligible electors / turnout		9,145	53.79%	-8.33%
Progressive Conservative notional hold		Swing		17.20%
Source(s) Source: "Little Bow Official Results 1989 Alberta general election". Alberta Heritage Community Foundation. Raymond Speaker crossed the floor to become an Progressive Conservative in 1987.

=== 1992 by-election ===
Alberta provincial by-election, March 5, 1992 following the resignation of Raymond Speaker on January 3, 1992
Party	Candidate	Votes	%	±%
Progressive Conservative	Barry McFarland	1,966	35.20	-44.34
Liberal	Donna Graham	1,704	30.51	18.72
New Democratic	Ruth Scalplock	601	10.76	2.09
Social Credit	Al Strom	521	9.33	–
Alliance	Larry Haller	399	7.14	–
Confederation of Regions	Dean Oseen	394	7.06	–
Total		5,585	–	–
Rejected, spoiled and declined		18	–	–
Eligible electors / turnout		9,158	61.18%	–
Progressive Conservative hold		Swing		-31.53
Source(s) Alberta. Chief Electoral Officer (1992). The report of the Chief Electoral Officer on the Little Bow by-election held Thursday, March 5, 1992 (Report). Edmonton: Alberta Legislative Assembly, Office of the Chief Electoral Officer.

=== 1993 ===
1993 Alberta general election
Party	Candidate	Votes	%	±%
Progressive Conservative	Barry McFarland	6,709	67.24%	32.04%
Liberal	Donna L. Graham	2,886	28.93%	-1.58%
New Democratic	Rod Lachmuth	382	3.83%	-6.93%
Total		9,977	–	–
Rejected, spoiled and declined		26	–	–
Eligible electors / turnout		15,087	66.30%	5.12%
Progressive Conservative hold		Swing		16.81%
Source(s) Source: "Little Bow Official Results 1993 Alberta general election". Alberta Heritage Community Foundation.

=== 1997 ===
1997 Alberta general election
Party	Candidate	Votes	%	±%
Progressive Conservative	Barry McFarland	6,726	69.56%	2.32%
Liberal	Alida Hess	2,075	21.46%	-7.47%
New Democratic	Marko Hilgersom	868	8.98%	5.15%
Total		9,669	–	–
Rejected, spoiled and declined		55	–	–
Eligible electors / turnout		17,896	54.34%	-11.97%
Progressive Conservative hold		Swing		4.89%
Source(s) Source: "Little Bow Official Results 1997 Alberta general election". Alberta Heritage Community Foundation.

=== 2001 ===
2001 Alberta general election
Party	Candidate	Votes	%	±%
Progressive Conservative	Barry McFarland	6,881	64.80%	-4.76%
Liberal	Arij Langstraat	2,534	23.86%	2.40%
Independent	Jon Koch	885	8.33%	–
New Democratic	Andrea Enes	319	3.00%	-5.97%
Total		10,619	–	–
Rejected, spoiled and declined		17	–	–
Eligible electors / turnout		18,771	56.66%	2.33%
Progressive Conservative hold		Swing		-3.58%
Source(s) Source: "Little Bow Official Results 2001 Alberta general election". Alberta Heritage Community Foundation.

=== 2004 ===
2004 Alberta general election
Party	Candidate	Votes	%	±%
Progressive Conservative	Barry McFarland	4,899	54.24%	-10.56%
Liberal	Arij Langstraat	1,961	21.71%	-2.15%
Alberta Alliance	Jay Phin	857	9.49%	–
Social Credit	Brian Cook	554	6.13%	–
Separation	Grant Shaw	433	4.79%	–
New Democratic	Hugh Logie	328	3.63%	0.63%
Total		9,032	–	–
Rejected, spoiled and declined		55	–	–
Eligible electors / turnout		19,835	45.81%	-10.85%
Progressive Conservative hold		Swing		-4.20%
Source(s) Source: "Little Bow Statement of Official Results 2004 Alberta general election" (PDF). Elections Alberta.

=== 2008 ===
2008 Alberta general election
Party	Candidate	Votes	%	±%
Progressive Conservative	Barry McFarland	5,150	58.06%	3.82%
Wildrose	Kevin Kinahan	2,051	23.12%	12.63%
Liberal	Everett Tanis	1,080	12.18%	-9.54%
New Democratic	Duane Petluk	322	3.63%	0.00%
Green	Marie Read	267	3.01%	–
Total		8,870	–	–
Rejected, spoiled and declined		32	–	–
Eligible electors / turnout		20,788	42.82%	-2.99%
Progressive Conservative hold		Swing		1.20%
Source(s) Source: "66 - Little Bow, 2008 Alberta general election". officialresults.elections.ab.ca. Elections Alberta.

=== 2012 ===
2012 Alberta general election
Party	Candidate	Votes	%	±%
Wildrose	Ian A. Donovan	6,750	54.03%	30.91%
Progressive Conservative	John Kolk	4,502	36.04%	-22.02%
New Democratic	Bev Muendel-Atherstone	767	6.14%	2.51%
Liberal	Everett Tanis	474	3.79%	-8.38%
Total		12,493	–	–
Rejected, spoiled, and declined		52	–	–
Eligible electors / turnout		23,572	53.22%	10.40%
Wildrose gain from Progressive Conservative		Swing		-8.47%
Source(s) Source: "70 - Little Bow, 2012 Alberta general election". officialresults.elections.ab.ca. Elections Alberta.

=== 2015 ===
2015 Alberta general election
Party	Candidate	Votes	%	±%
Wildrose	David Schneider	4,803	35.35%	-18.68%
Progressive Conservative	Ian A. Donovan	4,793	35.28%	-0.76%
New Democratic	Bev Muendel-Atherstone	3,364	24.76%	18.62%
Liberal	Helen McMenamin	377	2.77%	-1.02%
Social Credit	Caleb Van Der Weide	249	1.83%	–
Total		13,586	–	–
Rejected, spoiled and declined		42	–	–
Eligible electors / turnout		25,516	53.41%	0.19%
Wildrose hold		Swing		-8.96%
Source(s) Source: "70 - Little Bow, 2015 Alberta general election". officialresults.elections.ab.ca. Elections Alberta.

== Senate nominee election results ==
=== 2004 ===
2004 Senate nominee election results: Little Bow				Turnout 45.49%	
Affiliation	Candidate	Votes	% votes	% ballots	Rank
Progressive Conservative	Bert Brown	3,805	16.94%	51.29%	1
Progressive Conservative	Betty Unger	2,861	12.74%	38.56%	2
Independent	Link Byfield	2,771	12.33%	37.35%	4
Progressive Conservative	Cliff Breitkreuz	2,184	9.72%	29.44%	3
Progressive Conservative	Jim Silye	2,028	9.03%	27.34%	5
Alberta Alliance	Vance Gough	1,992	8.87%	26.85%	8
Progressive Conservative	David Usherwood	1,892	8.42%	25.50%	6
Alberta Alliance	Michael Roth	1,843	8.20%	24.84%	7
Alberta Alliance	Gary Horan	1,648	7.34%	22.21%	10
Independent	Tom Sindlinger	1,442	6.41%	19.44%	9
Total votes		22,466	100%		
Total ballots		7,419	3.03 votes per ballot		
Rejected, spoiled and declined		2,712			

Voters had the option of selecting four candidates on the ballot

== Student vote results ==
=== 2004 ===
Participating schools
Calvin Christian School
Champion School
Coalhurst High School
Dorothy Danliesh Elementary School
Huntsville School
Lomond Colony School
Noble Central School
Picture Butte High School
R.I. Baker Middle School
St. Josephs' School

On November 19, 2004, a student vote was conducted at participating Alberta schools to parallel the 2004 Alberta general election results. The vote was designed to educate students and simulate the electoral process for persons who have not yet reached the legal majority. The vote was conducted in 80 of the 83 provincial electoral districts with students voting for actual election candidates. Schools with a large student body that reside in another electoral district had the option to vote for candidates outside of the electoral district then where they were physically located.

2004 Alberta student vote results
Affiliation	Candidate	Votes	%
Progressive Conservative	Barry McFarland	396	41.12%
Liberal	Arij Langstraat	176	18.28%
New Democrat	Hugh Logie	114	11.84%
Alberta Alliance	Jay Phin	106	11.01%
Social Credit	Brian Cook	98	10.17%
Separation	Grant Shaw	73	7.58%
Total		963	100%
Rejected, spoiled and declined		74	

=== 2012 ===
2012 Alberta student vote results
Affiliation	Candidate	Votes	%
Progressive Conservative	John Kolk		%
Wildrose	Ian Donovan		
Liberal	Everett Tanis		%
NDP	Bev Muendel-Atherstone		%
Total			100%

== Plebiscite results ==
=== 1948 electrification plebiscite ===
District results from the first province wide plebiscite on electricity regulation.

Option A	Option B
Are you in favour of the generation and distribution of electricity being continued by the Power Companies?	Are you in favour of the generation and distribution of electricity being made a publicly owned utility administered by the Alberta Government Power Commission?
1,069 28.42%	2,716 71.76%
Province wide result: Option A passed.

=== 1957 liquor plebiscite ===
1957 Alberta liquor plebiscite results: Little Bow
Question A: Do you approve additional types of outlets for the sale of beer, wine and spirituous liquor subject to a local vote?
Ballot choice	Votes	%
Yes	1,584	51.50%
No	1,492	48.50%
Total Votes	3,076	100%
Rejected, spoiled and declined	1	
5,715 Eligible Electors, Turnout 53.84%

On October 30, 1957, a stand-alone plebiscite was held province wide in all 50 of the then current provincial electoral districts in Alberta. The government decided to consult Alberta voters to decide on liquor sales and mixed drinking after a divisive debate in the Legislature. The plebiscite was intended to deal with the growing demand for reforming antiquated liquor control laws.

The plebiscite was conducted in two parts. Question A asked in all districts, asked the voters if the sale of liquor should be expanded in Alberta, while Question B asked in a handful of districts within the corporate limits of Calgary and Edmonton asked if men and woman were allowed to drink together in establishments.

Province wide Question A of the plebiscite passed in 33 of the 50 districts while Question B passed in all five districts. Little Bow just barely voted in favour of the proposal with both sides polling a strong vote. Voter turnout in the district was one of the best in the province, significantly above the province wide average of 46%.

Official district returns were released to the public on December 31, 1957. The Social Credit government in power at the time did not considered the results binding. However the results of the vote led the government to repeal all existing liquor legislation and introduce an entirely new Liquor Act.

Municipal districts lying inside electoral districts that voted against the Plebiscite were designated Local Option Zones by the Alberta Liquor Control Board and considered effective dry zones, business owners that wanted a license had to petition for a binding municipal plebiscite in order to be granted a license.

=== Daylight saving plebiscites ===
==== 1967 ====
District data from the 1967 daylight saving plebiscite

Do you favour province-wide daylight saving time?
For	Against
1,365 27.98%	3,185 72.01%
Province wide result: Failed

==== 1971 ====
District data from the 1971 daylight saving plebiscite

Do you favour province-wide daylight saving time?
For	Against
2,306 40.17%	3,434 59.83%
Province wide result: Passed

== See also ==
- List of Alberta provincial electoral districts
- Canadian provincial electoral districts
