= Alvin Bullock =

Canadian politician

Alvin F. Bullock

Member of the Legislative Assembly of Alberta
- In office May 23, 1967 – August 30, 1971
- Preceded by: Edgar Hinman
- Succeeded by: Edgar Hinman
- Constituency: Cardston

Personal details
- Born: September 18, 1906 Welling, Alberta
- Died: March 14, 1993 (aged 86)
- Party: Social Credit
- Occupation: politician

Alvin Francis Bullock (September 18, 1906 – March 14, 1993) was a provincial politician from Alberta, Canada. He served as a member of the Legislative Assembly of Alberta from 1967 to 1971 sitting with the Social Credit caucus in government.

== Political career ==
Bullock ran for a seat to the Alberta Legislature in the 1967 Alberta general election. He defeated incumbent Edgar Hinman in a nomination race to become the Social Credit candidate for Cardston. In the election Bullock won a tight race over Progressive Conservative candidate Larry Lang to hold the seat for his party. He did not re-offer after the legislature was dissolved in 1971.
