= Cardston-Chief Mountain =

Defunct provincial electoral district in Alberta, Canada

Coordinates: 49.17°N 113.39°W

Cardston
Alberta electoral district

Defunct provincial electoral district
- Legislature: Legislative Assembly of Alberta
- District created: 1993
- District abolished: 1997
- First contested: 1993
- Last contested: 1993

Cardston-Chief Mountain was a provincial electoral district in Alberta, Canada, mandated to return a single member to the Legislative Assembly of Alberta using the first-past-the-post method of voting from 1993 to 1997.

== History ==
The Cardston-Chief Mountain electoral district was created in 1993 when the boundaries for Cardston were re-drawn after Pincher Creek-Crowsnest moved south. It merged with Taber-Warner in 1997 to form the riding Cardston-Taber-Warner.

== Legislative election results ==
=== 1993 ===
1993 Alberta general election
Party	Candidate	Votes	%	±%
Progressive Conservative	Jack Ady	3,345	69.20%	–
Liberal	Bruce A. Jackson	1,326	27.43%	–
New Democratic	Larry Zima	163	3.37%	–
Total		4,834	–	–
Rejected, spoiled and declined		10	–	–
Eligible electors / Turnout		9,043	53.57%	–
Progressive Conservative pickup new district.				
Source(s) Source:

== See also ==
- List of Alberta provincial electoral districts
- Canadian provincial electoral districts
