= John Thompson (Alberta politician) =

Canadian politician

John MacKenzie Thompson

MLA for Cardston
- In office 1975–1986
- Preceded by: Edgar Hinman
- Succeeded by: Jack Ady

Personal details
- Born: March 22, 1924 Pasadena, California
- Died: November 1, 2016 (aged 92)
- Party: Progressive Conservative
- Spouse: LeVaun Matkin (m.1949)

John MacKenzie Thompson (March 22, 1924 – November 1, 2016) was a politician from Alberta, Canada. He served in the Legislative Assembly of Alberta from 1975 to 1986.

== Political career ==
Thompson was first elected in the electoral district of Cardston in the 1975 Alberta general election, as a member of the Progressive Conservative Party. In the 1979 general election Thompson narrowly defeated challenger Broyce Jacobs of the Social Credit Party. In the 1982 general election he defeated Steve Pinchak of the Western Canada Concept Party. He retired at dissolution of the legislature in 1986.
