= James McNaughton (politician) =

Canadian politician

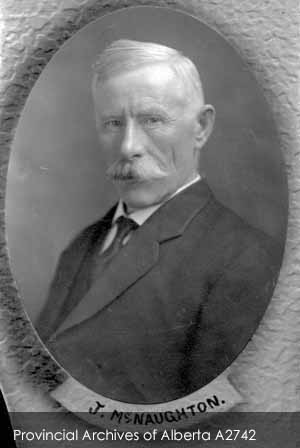

Member of the Legislative Assembly of Alberta
- In office April 17, 1913 – July 17, 1921
- Preceded by: district created
- Succeeded by: Oran McPherson
- Constituency: Little Bow

Personal details
- Born: March 10, 1864 Glengarry County, Canada West
- Died: January 1, 1959 (aged 94)
- Party: Liberal
- Spouse: Sarah Campbell (m. 1896)
- Occupation: Merchant; politician

James McNaughton (March 10, 1864 – January 1, 1959) was a Canadian politician and former member of the Legislative Assembly of Alberta from Alberta.

== Political career ==
James was first elected to the Legislative Assembly of Alberta for Little Bow for the Alberta Liberal Party in a hotly contested race against popular southern Alberta merchant John T. McDonald in the 1913 Alberta general election.

== 1913 election ==
The 1913 Little Bow election became bitter and scandal-plagued after campaign workers of Conservative rival John T. McDonald were arrested without charge and detained until after the election. The Calgary Herald claimed it was caused by "Siftonism" running rampant through the province. In that same election the Liberals were also accused of gerrymandering Little Bow to be very liberal-friendly.

== 1917 election ==
James was easily re-elected in a landslide in the 1917 Alberta general election. H. Thomas of the Socialist Party was the only other candidate during the election. Turn out in Little Bow was at its lowest ever with only 35% of the population turning out.

== Defeat ==
James McNaughton was handily defeated by future speaker Oran McPherson from the United Farmers of Alberta in the 1921 Alberta general election.

Legislative Assembly of Alberta
| Preceded by New District | MLA Little Bow; 1913-1921 | Succeeded by Oran McPherson |
