= Jack Ady =

Canadian politician (1932–2019)

Member of the Legislative Assembly of Alberta for Cardston-Chief Mountain Cardston (1986-1993)
- In office May 8, 1986 – March 11, 1997
- Preceded by: John Thompson
- Succeeded by: Ron Hierath

Personal details
- Born: September 22, 1932 Cardston, Alberta, Canada
- Died: November 26, 2019 (aged 87) Alberta, Canada
- Party: Progressive Conservative
- Relations: Cindy Ady (daughter-in-law)
- Children: Five

Jack William Ady (September 22, 1932 – November 26, 2019) was a provincial-level politician from Alberta, Canada. He served as a member of the Legislative Assembly of Alberta from 1986 to 1997. He was born in Cardston, Alberta.

== Political career ==
Ady was elected to the Alberta Legislature in the 1986 Alberta general election. He won the electoral district of Cardston by a comfortable margin to hold the district for the Progressive Conservatives defeating three other candidates. He was re-elected to his second term in the 1989 Alberta general election. He defeated two other candidates in a landslide. Premier Ralph Klein appointed Ady as the Minister of Advanced Education and Technology and Career Development in 1992, he held that post until he left office in 1997.

In 2008 the Alberta government disbanded the existing health care boards and created one single provincial board. It was titled the Alberta Health Services Board. Ady was appointed to the new 15 member board, where he served until August 31, 2010.

The riding of Cardston was abolished due to redistribution for the 1993 Alberta general election. Ady ran for re-election in the new electoral district of Cardston-Chief Mountain. He won that district by slightly reduced plurality defeating two other candidates.

Ady did not run for a fourth term and retired at dissolution of the Assembly in 1997. His daughter in law Cindy Ady was the MLA for the electoral district of Calgary Shaw from 2001 to 2012.

Ady is a father of five children: Donald, Jack (Douglas), Lori, John, and Robert.

== Late life ==
After leaving political office, Ady joined the Mount Royal College Board of Governors in 2000. A year later, on August 21, 2001, Minister of Learning Lyle Oberg appointed him as Chair the Board. He died on November 26, 2019.
