= Dave Schneider (politician) =

Canadian politician and farmer

David A. Schneider
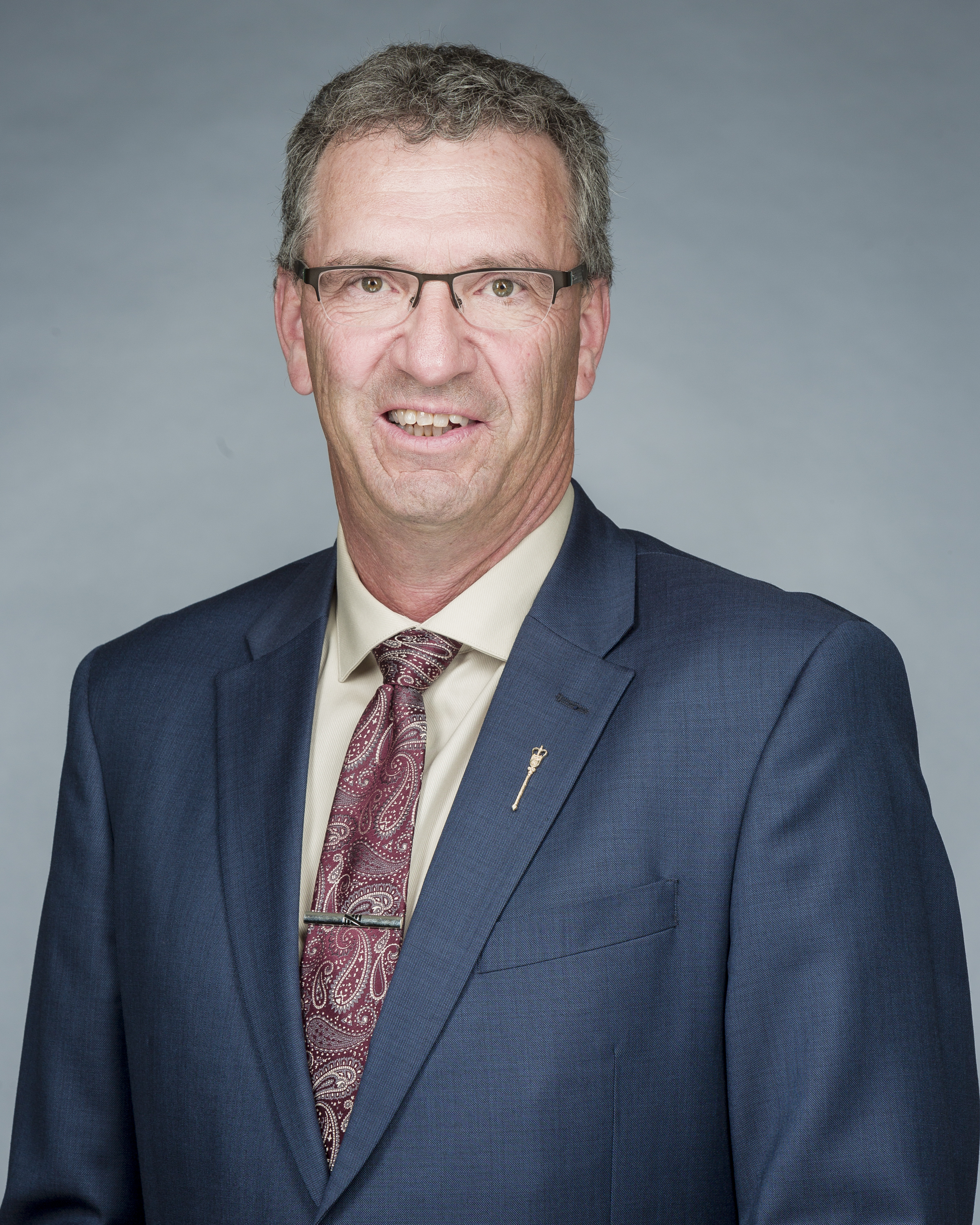

Member of the Legislative Assembly of Alberta for Little Bow
- In office May 5, 2015 – March 19, 2019
- Preceded by: Ian Donovan
- Succeeded by: district abolished

Personal details
- Born: September 9, 1957 (age 68) Vulcan County, Alberta, Canada
- Party: United Conservative
- Other political affiliations: Wildrose (2015–17)
- Occupation: Farmer

David A. Schneider (born September 9, 1957) is a Canadian farmer and politician who was elected in the 2015 Alberta general election to the Legislative Assembly of Alberta as a member of the Wildrose Party to represent the electoral district of Little Bow.

== Electoral history ==
=== 2015 general election ===
2015 Alberta general election
Party	Candidate	Votes	%
Wildrose	David Schneider	4,803	35.4%
Progressive Conservative	Ian Donovan	4,791	35.3%
New Democratic	Bev Muendel-Atherstone	3,359	24.7%
Liberal	Helen McMenamin	379	2.8%
Social Credit	Caleb Van Der Weide	249	1.8%
