= Raymond Speaker =

Canadian politician

The Honourable Raymond Speaker PC ECA OC

Member of Parliament for Lethbridge
- In office October 25, 1993 – June 2, 1997
- Preceded by: Blaine Thacker
- Succeeded by: Rick Casson

Leader of the Official Opposition in Alberta
- In office December 16, 1980 – November 1, 1982
- Preceded by: Robert Curtis Clark
- Succeeded by: Grant Notley

Member of the Legislative Assembly of Alberta for Little Bow
- In office June 17, 1963 – January 3, 1992
- Preceded by: Peter Dawson
- Succeeded by: Barry McFarland

Personal details
- Born: December 13, 1935 (age 90) Enchant, Alberta, Canada
- Party: Social Credit (provincial, 1963-1982); Independent (1982); Representative (provincial, 1982-1989); Alberta PC (provincial, 1989-1992); Reform (federal, 1992-2000); Canadian Alliance (federal, 2000-2003); Conservative (2003-present)
- Spouse: Ingrid Marie Schwab (m. 1966)
- Children: 2
- Education: University of Alberta

Raymond Albert Speaker, PC ECA OC (born December 13, 1935) is a Canadian politician. Speaker was born and raised in Enchant, Alberta, where he farms to this day. He served in the Alberta legislature and the Canadian Parliament for a total of 34 years.

== Provincial politics ==
Speaker graduated from the University of Alberta and taught in local schools until 1962. In the 1963 Alberta general election he was elected in the rural riding of Little Bow under the banner of the Social Credit Party of Alberta. In 1967 he was named to Ernest Manning's cabinet as minister without portfolio, and in 1968 he was named Minister of Health and Social Development and Minister of Personnel. In 1969 he became Chairman of the Human Resources Development Authority under Manning's successor, Harry Strom.

He remained a Social Credit MLA for many years after the party lost power in the 1971 election, usually winning handily even as the party's support ebbed away in the rest of the province. When Bob Clark resigned the party leadership in 1980, a few months after losing the 1979 election, Speaker became parliamentary leader of the party and hence Leader of the Opposition. However, in 1982, Speaker announced that Social Credit would be sitting out that year's election due to dwindling support for the party. A few months earlier, Clark's former seat had been resoundingly lost in a by-election, costing Social Credit official party status. Speaker's announcement was disavowed by party officials, and a motion to dissolve the party failed. Soon after the election was called, Speaker and Walt Buck resigned from the party and were re-elected as independents. Denied funding guaranteed to political parties, Speaker and Buck formed a new right-wing party, the Representative Party of Alberta, and Speaker was elected its leader. It styled itself a modern version of Social Credit without the social credit monetary policy, and was intended to be a home for former Socreds. Speaker was reelected under his party's banner in 1986. While the Representative Party attracted support from a number of former Socred supporters, Buck was the party's only other MLA.

However, in 1989, Speaker crossed the floor to the governing Progressive Conservative Association of Alberta. He told his riding association that with Getty accepting the Representative Party's main policy plank, a balanced budget, there was no reason to continue in opposition. He was re-elected with 70 percent of the vote in 1989, his best showing at the polls. Following that election, he was named to the cabinet as Minister of Housing and Urban Affairs.

Speaker was the last surviving member of the last Socred government, as well as the last parliamentary survivor of the Manning and Strom governments.

== National politics ==
Speaker resigned his provincial seat after winning the nomination of the Reform Party of Canada for the seat of Lethbridge in the federal Parliament. He won handily, and served as finance critic and House Leader of the Reform caucus. He retired from politics at the 1997 election.

== After politics ==
In 1999, Speaker was appointed to the Security Intelligence Review Committee, an agency which provides an external review of the Canadian Security Intelligence Service, and was named to the Queen's Privy Council for Canada.

In 2001, he was made an Officer of the Order of Canada.

In 2003, he received an Honorary Doctorate from the University of Lethbridge, Honorary Doctorate of Laws.

After the Conservative Party won a plurality of seats in the 2006 federal election, Speaker was appointed to the Prime Minister's transition team. He also was the chair of the Conservative-Canadian Alliance merger.

He was appointed as a mentor for the Trudeau Foundation of Canada in January 2008.

Legislative Assembly of Alberta
Preceded by Peter Dawson	MLA Little Bow; 1963–1992	Succeeded by Barry McFarland
Preceded by Robert Curtis Clark	Leader of the Official Opposition in Alberta; 1980–1982	Succeeded by Grant Notley
Parliament of Canada
Preceded by Blaine Thacker	Member of Parliament Lethbridge; 1993–1997	Succeeded by Rick Casson
