= Oran McPherson =

Canadian politician

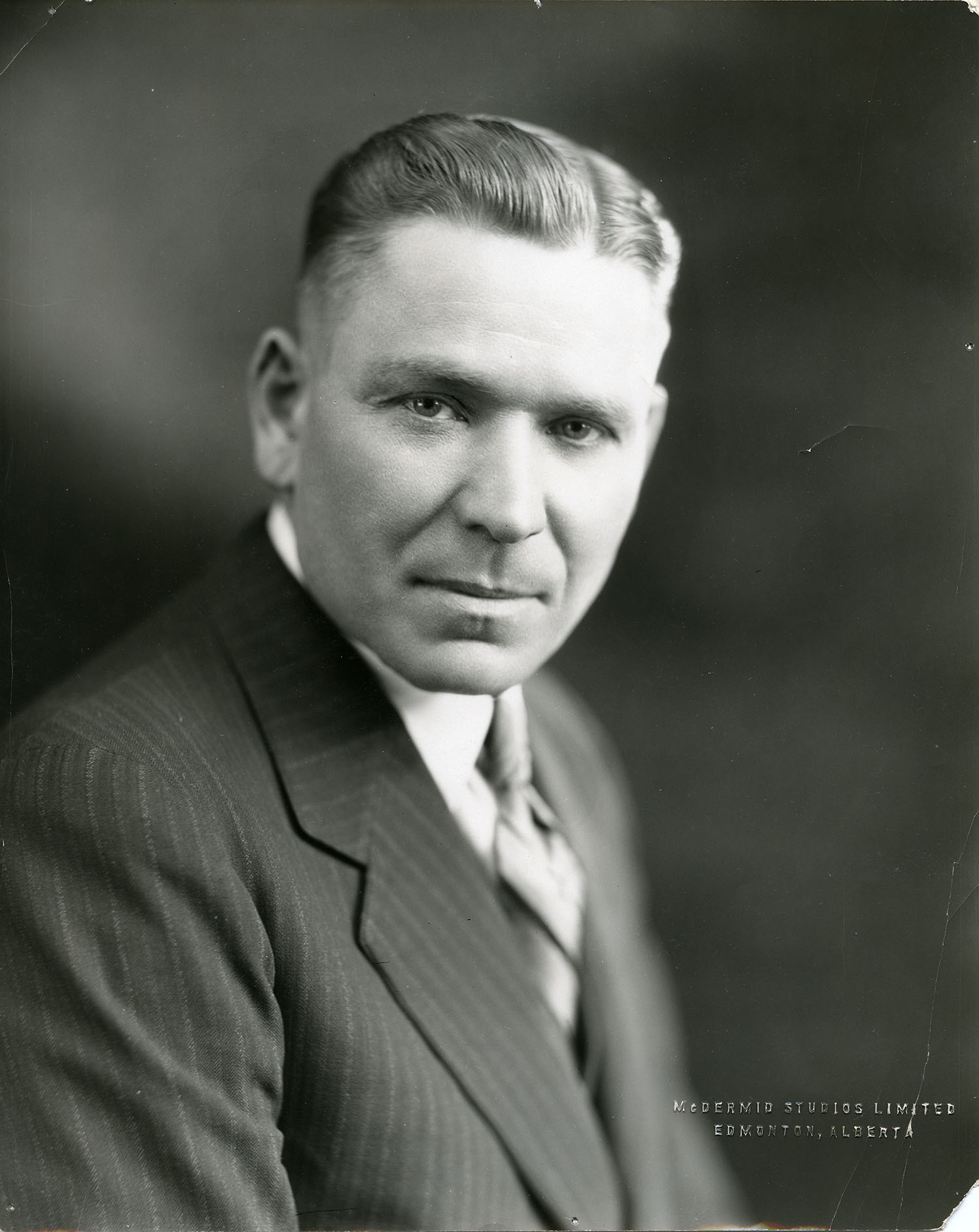

Speaker of the Legislative Assembly of Alberta
- In office 1922–1926
- Preceded by: Charles Pingle
- Succeeded by: George Johnston

Personal details
- Born: April 12, 1886 Kingman, Kansas, United States
- Died: May 23, 1949 (aged 63) Victoria, British Columbia, Canada
- Party: United Farmers

Oran Leo "Tony" McPherson (April 12, 1886 – May 23, 1949) was a member of the Legislative Assembly of Alberta (Canada) for Little Bow from 1921 to 1935 as a member of the United Farmers of Alberta.

== Early life ==
He was born in Kingman, Kansas, United States in 1886 and attended the University of Illinois before moving to Alberta in 1906.

== Political career ==
He served as speaker of the assembly from 1922 to 1926. He also later served as the Minister of Public Works.

In 1932, he had a nasty divorce that made headlines across Alberta newspapers. This was one of the events that hurt the United Farmers and gave them the reputation of being afflicted by moral decay that would help lead the party to its demise in 1935 at the hands of Social Credit.

== Bibliography ==
- Perry, Sandra E.; Footz, Valerie L. (2006). A Higher Duty : Speakers of the Legislative Assemblies of the North-West Territories and Alberta, 1888-2005. Edmonton, Alberta: Legislative Assembly of Alberta. ISBN 0-9689217-3-6.

Legislative Assembly of Alberta
Preceded by James McNaughton	MLA Little Bow; 1921-1935	Succeeded by Peter Dawson
Preceded by Charles Pingle	Speaker of the Alberta Legislative Assembly; 1922-1926	Succeeded by George Johnston
