= Peter Dawson (politician) =

Canadian politician (1892–1963)

The Honourable Reverend Peter Dawson
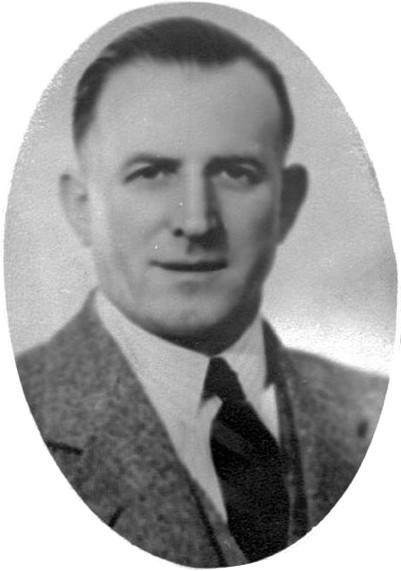

Speaker of the Legislative Assembly of Alberta
- In office February 25, 1937 – March 24, 1963
- Preceded by: Nathan Eldon Tanner
- Succeeded by: Arthur J. Dixon

Member of the Legislative Assembly of Alberta
- In office August 22, 1935 – March 24, 1963
- Preceded by: Oran McPherson
- Succeeded by: Raymond Speaker
- Constituency: Little Bow

Personal details
- Born: April 11, 1892 Slateford, Ayrshire, Scotlan
- Died: March 24, 1963 (aged 70) Edmonton, Alberta, Canada
- Party: Social Credit
- Spouse: Hildegarde "Hilde" Hallonquist (m. 1923)
- Children: Earland McMaurray; David Gilmour
- Education: Robertson College; St. Stephen's College

Peter Dawson (April 11, 1892 – March 24, 1963) was a Canadian minister and politician who served in the Legislative Assembly of Alberta.

Dawson was born in 1892 in Scotland. After attending schools and briefly working as a labourer and an apprentice to a butcher in Maybole, Dawson immigrated to Canada at the age of 18 with his brother, James Dawson. Shortly after arriving, he took up residence in Ontario where he worked in the automobile profession for seven years until moving west to Alberta in 1918.

Following his decision to settle in Calgary, he found employment as a butcher and interest in missionary work. His residence in Calgary, however, didn't last long, as five years later, he moved to the nearby capital city of Edmonton, where he attended Prebysterian schooling. Ordained as a minister of the United Church in 1927, he soon was called in 1928 to Sedgewick, where he remained for two years, before getting called to Champion. Although not intending to have a career in politics, a group of citizens persuaded him to run in the 1935 election, in which he defeated United Farmers Member of the Legislative Assembly (MLA) Oran McPherson by 66% of the vote.

In 1937, Dawson was appointed Speaker of the Legislative Assembly of Alberta. During his 26-year tenure, from 1937 until his death in 1963, he witnessed and presided over many events, such as the first instance of crossing the floor in Alberta and naming a fellow MLA for remarks made at a provincial official. He also witnessed two royal visits to Alberta from two different monarchs, King George IV in 1939, and Queen Elizabeth II 20 years later, in which he presided over the installation of a fountain in the Legislature's rotunda. After dying in office in 1963, Dawson was honoured with a state funeral, attended by many prominent citizens of Alberta.

== Early life and career ==
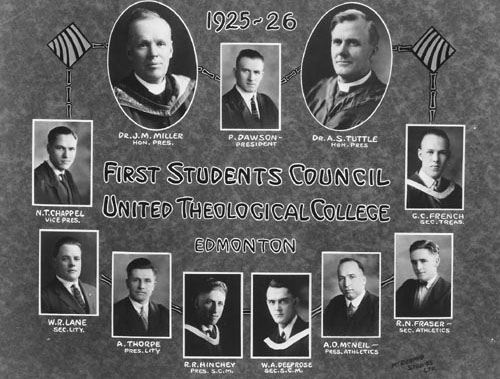
United Theological College Student Council, 1925–26

Dawson was born in Slateford, Ayrshire, Scotland, on April 11, 1892 to John and Jane Dawson (née McMurray). He was one of ten children, one of whom was his twin sister who died at the age of five months. John Dawson died in 1900, when Peter was only eight years old; he had worked as a police constable and blacksmith.

Dawson attended public schools and attended the Carrick Academy in Maybole. After finishing school, he worked as a farm labourer and a butcher's apprentice. In 1911, Dawson and his brother James sailed on the SS Ionian from Glasgow and arrived in Halifax nine days later. Dawson settled in Ontario and worked at an automobile manufacturer, Tudhope-Anderson, in Simcoe County. Seven years later, in 1918, he moved to Calgary, Alberta, where he worked as a butcher for several years.

After five years in Calgary, he moved to Edmonton, where he enrolled in Robertson College, a Prebysterian seminary. He then studied arts and theology at United Theological College, which later become St. Stephen's College, on the University of Alberta campus, where he was the first president of the student council and one of its first graduates in 1927. He was ordained a minister later in the year at Knox United Church in Calgary.

== Politics ==
Although he had no interest in politics at first, Dawson ran in the 1935 election as a Social Credit candidate in the riding of Little Bow, at the urging of a citizens' group. He defeated United Farmers of Alberta candidate and former speaker Oran McPherson by 66% of the vote. Dawson was re-elected seven consecutive times and held his seat for twenty-eight years.

=== Speaker of the Legislative Assembly ===
Dawson was elected Speaker of the Legislative Assembly in 1937. In February of the same year, as Speaker-Designate, he arranged the Opening Session of the Legislature to be broadcast on CJCA radio. Dawson and his family frequently took up residence at the Speaker's suite while the Legislature was in session, thus making him readily accessible as Speaker. He was also responsible for many other things, including, though not a part of his official duties, writing the Speech from the Throne, which he compiled from various information from government departments.

Dawson's time as speaker saw many firsts in Alberta legislative history; one was the defection in 1937 of cabinet ministers William N. Chant and John Hugill from the Social Credit caucus to sit as independents. This was the first instance of crossing the floor in the province's legislative history. In June 1939, Dawson played a major role in ceremonies at the Legislature during the royal visits of King George VI and Princess (later Queen) Elizabeth. He and his wife acted as their hosts during their visits.

He was re-nominated as speaker in 1941 by Premier William Aberhart and in 1945, 1949, 1953, 1955 and 1960 by Premier Ernest Manning. The 1945 nomination was seconded by Leader of the Opposition J. Percy Page, the first time that a nomination had been supported by the Official Opposition. During a debate on child welfare in 1949, Dawson ruled comments by Alberta Liberal Leader James Harper Prowse unparliamentary. Prowse had said: "Members of the Government, not content with hiding behind the skirts of unfortunate women, now cloak themselves behind the diapers of more unfortunate babies." Dawson had also ruled other terms, such as "trickery" and "deaf", unparliamentary during his time as speaker.

He was chosen to chair a committee set up in 1951 to revise the rules of the Assembly. During a session on March 21, 1952, Dawson was pushed to name Arthur Wray, MLA for Banff-Cochrane, after Wray made remarks towards a provincial official at a committee meeting. When asked by Dawson to withdraw the remarks, Wray refused, prompting Dawson to name him and order his removal from the chamber. A unanimous motion was later passed to suspend Wray for two sitting days, or until he withdrew his remarks and delivered an apology to the chamber. Wray returned four days later, issuing an apology and retracting his remarks.

On February 9, 1956, at the opening of the second session of the 13th Legislature, Dawson accepted a new mace from the Civil Service Association of Alberta on the occasion of the province's 50th anniversary of entry into Confederation. On the occasion of another royal visit in 1959, this time by Prince Philip and Queen Elizabeth, Dawson had a permanent fountain installed in the rotunda of the Legislature. Upon Dawson's 25th anniversary as Speaker, John Wingblade, MLA from Wetaskiwin, presented him with a silver-banded gavel on behalf of all members. He continued to serve as Speaker until his sudden death in 1963, right before the 1963 election. He served for 26 years in total as Speaker, the longest in the history of the Legislative Assembly of Alberta.

== Church career ==
During his time in Calgary, Dawson became interested in missionary work. After being ordained as a minister in 1927, his first call, in 1928, was to Sedgewick, Alberta, where he served two years. He was then called to the United Church in Champion on October 10, 1930; there he conducted services mostly in schoolhouses. In 1954, he went to Carmangay, Alberta in 1954 to serve as a resident minister. He conducted services in various places in Alberta during his 30 years as a minister, ranging from schoolhouses to churches. In some services, he participated in duets and sometimes performed solo, with a strong baritone voice. Dawson continued his service as a minister of the cloth during his political career. He retired from the ministry in 1960 after 33 years of service.

== Personal life ==
On December 26, 1923, in Calgary, Dawson married Hildegarde Christina Hallonquist, whom he had met while serving as a missionary that summer. Hilde was the daughter of Swedish immigrants Johannes and Hanna Hallonquist. Her father, commonly known as John, helped Swedish immigrants settle in Manitoba, and later became a foreman for the Canadian Pacific Railway. Peter and Hilde had two sons, Earland "Earl" McMurray Dawson (1928–2008) and David Gilmour Dawson (born 1933). Both became successful professional engineers in Ontario.

Dawson enjoyed a wide range of recreational activities, including golf, curling, badminton and gardening at his home in Vulcan. He took part in the planning and establishment of Little Bow Provincial Park near Champion. He was an active member of the Grand Lodge of Alberta, a fraternal association; he served in the office of Worshipful Master of Champion Lodge in 1947, Grand Chaplain of the Grand Lodge in 1949 and 1950, and Grand Master in 1954 and 1955. He was also active in Shrine and Scottish Rite Lodges. Dawson and his wife moved to Vulcan, Alberta in 1960, where they purchased their first house.

Dawson received many honours during his time as Speaker, including a life membership in the Alberta Legislative Press Gallery Association, in which he had served as an honorary president. One year after his death, in 1964, the Vulcan Senior Citizens Centre was named Peter Dawson Lodge in his memory, in a contest to name the facility.

== Death and funeral ==
On March 24, 1963, after a speaking engagement in Red Deer, to the Masons at Lodge Perfection, Ancient and Accepted Scottish Rite, to whom he delivered a sermon entitled "We know not the hour!", Dawson suffered a heart attack in the Speaker's Suite in the Legislature Building. Attended by Health Minister Joseph Donovan Ross, he died on the way to University of Alberta Hospital, the only Speaker in the history of the Alberta Legislative Assembly to die in office. His death was announced the next day by Clerk Raymond A. A. Crevolin. After members of the House paid tribute to Dawson, the session was quickly adjourned.

On the morning of March 28, his body lay in state in the chamber, the first time a Speaker was so honoured. Several hundred people gathered in the chamber to pay their last respects. His body was then taken to Robertson United Church for the state funeral, with several church, judiciary, and government officials from across the province among the three hundred or so attending, and with Premier Manning officiating and delivering the eulogy. Others in attendance were Lieutenant Governor J. Percy Page and Edmonton mayor Elmer Roper. His body was later transported by train to Vulcan, where, after a second service, he was interred in the Vulcan Cemetery. Soon after his death, Hilde Dawson moved to Lethbridge. Upon her death on June 15, 1987, she was interred beside her husband.

== Legacy ==
Upon Dawson's death, Premier Manning said, "In his passing not only Alberta, but all of Canada has lost one of its outstanding figures. The reputation he built with his fair judgments and honest ability won him the confidence and respect of all members of the Assembly and extended beyond the borders of Alberta." Former Mayor of Edmonton and MLA Elmer E. Roper said, "I doubt if there has ever been anyone who occupied the Speaker's chair in Canada who was more fair and efficient in chairmanship over an assembly then the late Speaker." Dawson's son David recalled his father's personableness in that he "talked easily with complete strangers" and could start up a conversation with anyone he met. Former MLA and future Lieutenant Governor Grant MacEwan likened sitting in the Assembly under Dawson to "attending the school of a strict but well-qualified and kindly teacher."

== Bibliography ==
- Perry, Sandra E.; Footz, Valerie L. (2006). A Higher Duty : Speakers of the Legislative Assemblies of the North-West Territories and Alberta, 1888-2005. Edmonton, Alberta: Legislative Assembly of Alberta. ISBN 0-9689217-3-6.
- Carmangay and District History Book Committee (1968). Bridging the Years : Carmangay and district. Lethbridge, Alberta: Southern Printing Company Limited.
- Champion History Committee (1972). Cleverville - Champion: 1905 to 1970: A history of Champion and area. Champion, Alberta: Champion History Committee. ISBN 978-0-919212-11-4.
