= Nathan Eldon Tanner =

Canadian politician and Mormon religious leader (1898–1982)

N. Eldon Tanner
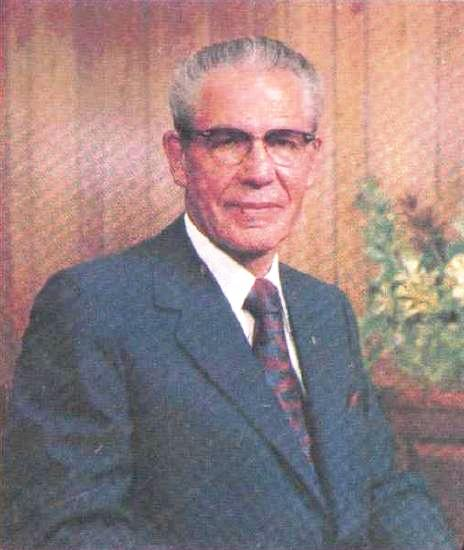

First Counselor in the First Presidency
- 30 December 1973 – 27 November 1982
- Called by: Spencer W. Kimball
- Reason: Reorganization of First Presidency

First Counselor in the First Presidency
- 7 July 1972 – 26 December 1973
- Called by: Harold B. Lee
- Reason: Reorganization of First Presidency
- End reason: Dissolution of First Presidency upon the death of Harold B. Lee

Second Counselor in the First Presidency
- 23 January 1970 – 2 July 1972
- Called by: Joseph Fielding Smith
- Reason: Reorganization of First Presidency
- End reason: Dissolution of First Presidency upon the death of Joseph Fielding Smith

Second Counselor in the First Presidency
- 4 October 1963 – 18 January 1970
- Called by: David O. McKay
- Reason: Death of Henry D. Moyle
- End reason: Dissolution of First Presidency upon the death of David O. McKay

Quorum of the Twelve Apostles
- 11 October 1962 – 4 October 1963
- Called by: David O. McKay
- Reason: Death of George Q. Morris

LDS Church Apostle
- 11 October 1962 – 27 November 1982
- Called by: David O. McKay
- Reason: Death of George Q. Morris
- Reorganization at end of term: No apostles ordained

Assistant to the Quorum of the Twelve Apostles
- 8 October 1960 – 11 October 1962
- Called by: David O. McKay
- End reason: Called to the Quorum of the Twelve Apostles

Member of the Legislative Assembly of Alberta for Cardston

In office
- 22 August 1935 – 5 August 1952
- Predecessor: George Stringam
- Successor: Edgar Hinman

Speaker of the Alberta Legislative Assembly

In office
- 6 February 1936 – 4 January 1937
- Predecessor: George Johnston
- Successor: Peter Dawson

Minister of Lands and Mines

In office
- 5 January 1937 – 1 April 1949
- Predecessor: Charles Ross
- Premier: William Aberhart and Ernest Manning

Minister of Forestry, Lands and Wildlife

In office
- 1 April 1949 – 9 September 1952
- Predecessor: Ivan Casey
- Premier: Ernest Manning

Minister of Mines and Minerals

In office
- 1 April 1949 – 9 September 1952
- Predecessor: Ernest Manning
- Premier: Ernest Manning
- Political party: Social Credit

Personal details
- Born: 9 May 1898; Salt Lake City, Utah, U.S.
- Died: 27 November 1982 (aged 84); Salt Lake City, Utah, U.S.
- Resting place: Salt Lake City Cemetery; 40°46′37.92″N 111°51′28.8″W
- Occupation: Teacher, Politician, Religious Leader
- Spouse(s): Sara Isabelle Merrill (m. 1919)
- Children: 5 daughters

Nathan Eldon Tanner (9 May 1898 – 27 November 1982) was a Canadian politician and a leader of the Church of Jesus Christ of Latter-day Saints (LDS Church). He served in the Legislative Assembly of Alberta from 1935 to 1952 as a member of the Social Credit caucus in government. He served as Speaker of the Legislative Assembly from 1936 to 1937 and as a cabinet minister in the governments of William Aberhart and Ernest Manning from 1937 to 1952, in various portfolios related to resource industries.

== Early life ==
Tanner was born on 9 May 1898, in Salt Lake City, Utah, to Nathan William Tanner and Sarah Edna Brown Tanner. He had seven younger siblings. His family emigrated to Canada and had a farmstead in Aetna, south of Cardston, Alberta, where he grew up and attended grade school. He attended high school at Knight Academy in Raymond and received some postsecondary education at Calgary Normal School.

Tanner began his working life at a grocery store and butcher shop. He obtained a job teaching at a small school in Hill Spring in 1919. He met Sara Isabelle Merrill at the school and married her on 20 December 1919 and they became the parents of five daughters.

Along with teaching, Tanner also established his own general store, which later also became the local post office, to supplement his family income. The store was successful enough that he left his first teaching job in Hill Spring to run the store full-time.

Tanner eventually became a high school teacher and school principal in Cardston. He got his start in politics as a councillor on the Cardston Town Council.

== Political and business career ==
Tanner was drafted to run for a seat to the Legislative Assembly of Alberta for the first time in the 1935 general election. He ran as a Social Credit candidate in the electoral district of Cardston and defeated the incumbent United Farmers MLA George Stringam.

After the election and despite his complete lack of parliamentary experience, Tanner was chosen to be fifth-ever Speaker of the Alberta Legislature when the first session of the 8th Alberta Legislative Assembly began. He served in that role until 5 January 1937, when Premier William Aberhart appointed Tanner the Minister of Lands and Mines. His time in this capacity and as legislator spanned 16 years.

In the 1940 general election, Tanner defeated the independent candidate S.H. Nelson in a two-way race.

In the 1944 general election, Tanner won a three-way race.

In the 1948 Alberta general election, Tanner easily won a two-way race over the Liberal candidate Briant Stringam to hold his seat.

In 1949, Ernest Manning changed Tanner's ministerial portfolio from Lands and Mines to Lands and Forests. Tanner was also appointed Minister of Mines and Minerals and held both portfolios until his retirement from the Legislature at its dissolution in 1952.

In 1952 Tanner left politics and became president of Merrill Petroleums in Calgary. In 1954 Manning and federal Minister of Trade and Industry C. D. Howe asked him to become president of TransCanada PipeLines Limited. During Tanner's contract of five years, the TransCanada pipeline was built from Alberta to Montreal.

== LDS Church ==
In 1960, Tanner was called as an Assistant to the Quorum of the Twelve Apostles, a full-time LDS Church general authority. He had previous experience in church leadership, having served as a bishop, branch president, and stake president in Canada. In the church, he preferred to be referred to as "N. Eldon Tanner." In 1962, the death of George Q. Morris created a vacancy in the Quorum of the Twelve Apostles, which Tanner was called to fill in October 1962. He was still the quorum's junior member one year later when he was called into the First Presidency as second counselor to church president David O. McKay. Tanner remained in that position for the church presidency of Joseph Fielding Smith (1970–1972) and then became first counselor to Smith's successor, Harold B. Lee and later to Spencer W. Kimball until Tanner's death. He thus served as counselor to four church presidents. While Tanner was a member of the First Presidency, the membership numbers of the church grew from 1.7 million to 5 million.

As the First Presidency, Kimball, Tanner, and Marion G. Romney announced the reception of the Revelation on Priesthood in June 1978, which established that being of black African descent would no longer be a barrier to ordination to the church's priesthood. The announcement was canonized as "Official Declaration 2" in the church's Doctrine and Covenants. Tanner formally presented the announcement for acceptance by the church at a general conference in October 1978.

Not long afterward, Tanner's health deteriorated, and it became impossible for him to continue the duties of his office. Kimball and Romney were also ailing, and the decision was made to add Gordon B. Hinckley as an additional counselor to the First Presidency on 23 July 1981, with Neal A. Maxwell ordained to take Hinckley's seat in the Quorum of the Twelve Apostles. Tanner remained first counselor until his death on 27 November 1982, at the age of 84. Because of the appointments of Maxwell and Hinckley the prior year, no additional individuals were added to the First Presidency and no apostles were ordained as a result of his death.

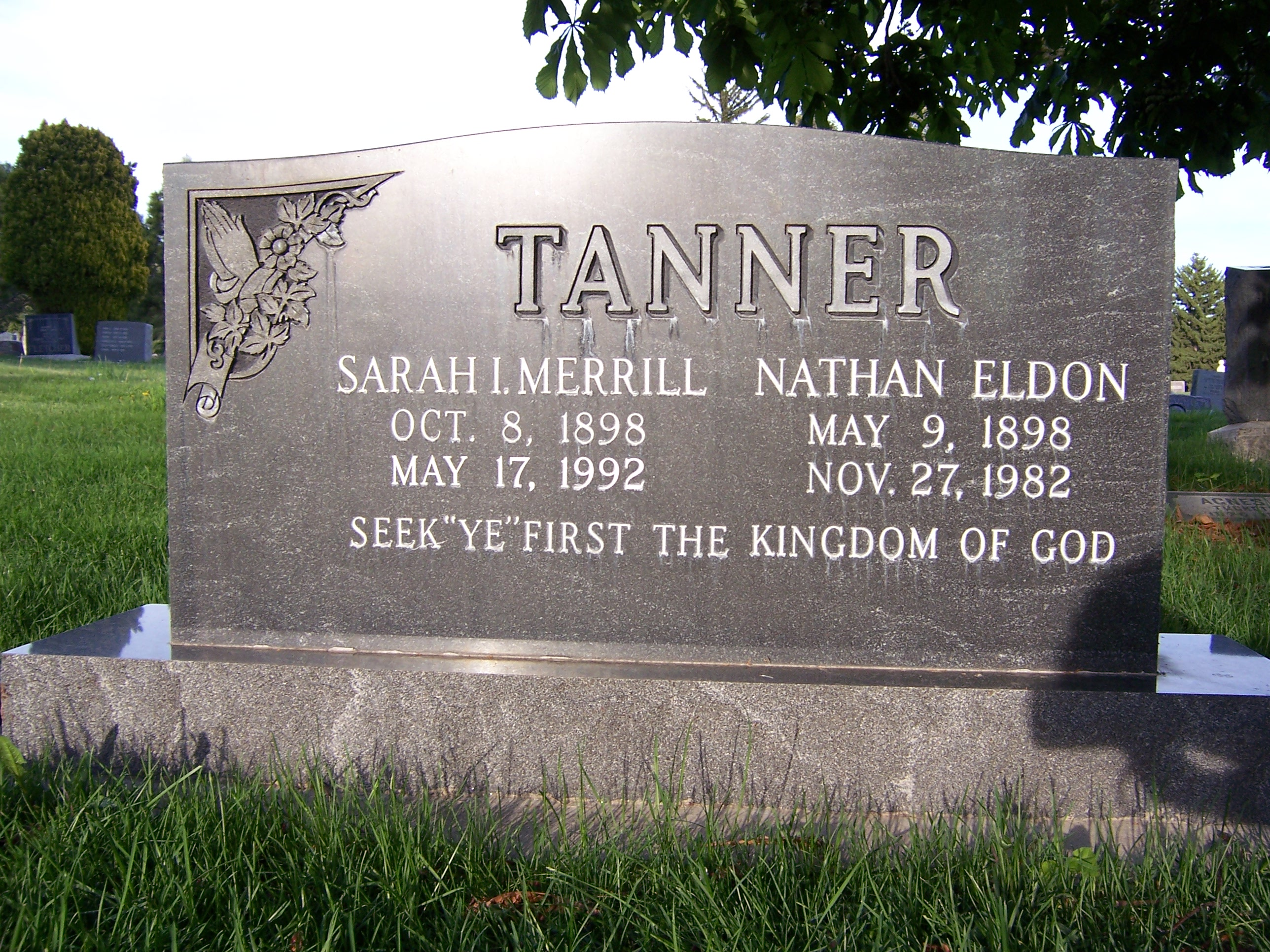
Grave marker of N. Eldon Tanner

== Notes ==
The Church of Jesus Christ of Latter-day Saints titles
Preceded by Harold B. Lee	First Counselor in the First Presidency; 7 July 1972 – 26 December 1973; 30 December 1973 – 27 November 1982	Succeeded by Marion G. Romney
Preceded by Hugh B. Brown; Harold B. Lee	Second Counselor in the First Presidency; 4 October 1963 – 18 January 1970; 23 January 1970 – 2 July 1972	Succeeded by Marion G. Romney
Preceded by Gordon B. Hinckley	Quorum of the Twelve Apostles; 11 October 1962 – 4 October 1963	Succeeded by Thomas S. Monson
Political offices
Preceded by George Stringam	Member of the Legislative Assembly of Alberta; 22 August 1935–5 August 1952	Succeeded by Edgar Hinman
Preceded by George Johnston	Speaker of the Alberta Legislative Assembly; 1936 –1937	Succeeded by Peter Dawson
