= George Stringam =

Canadian politician

George Lewis Stringam
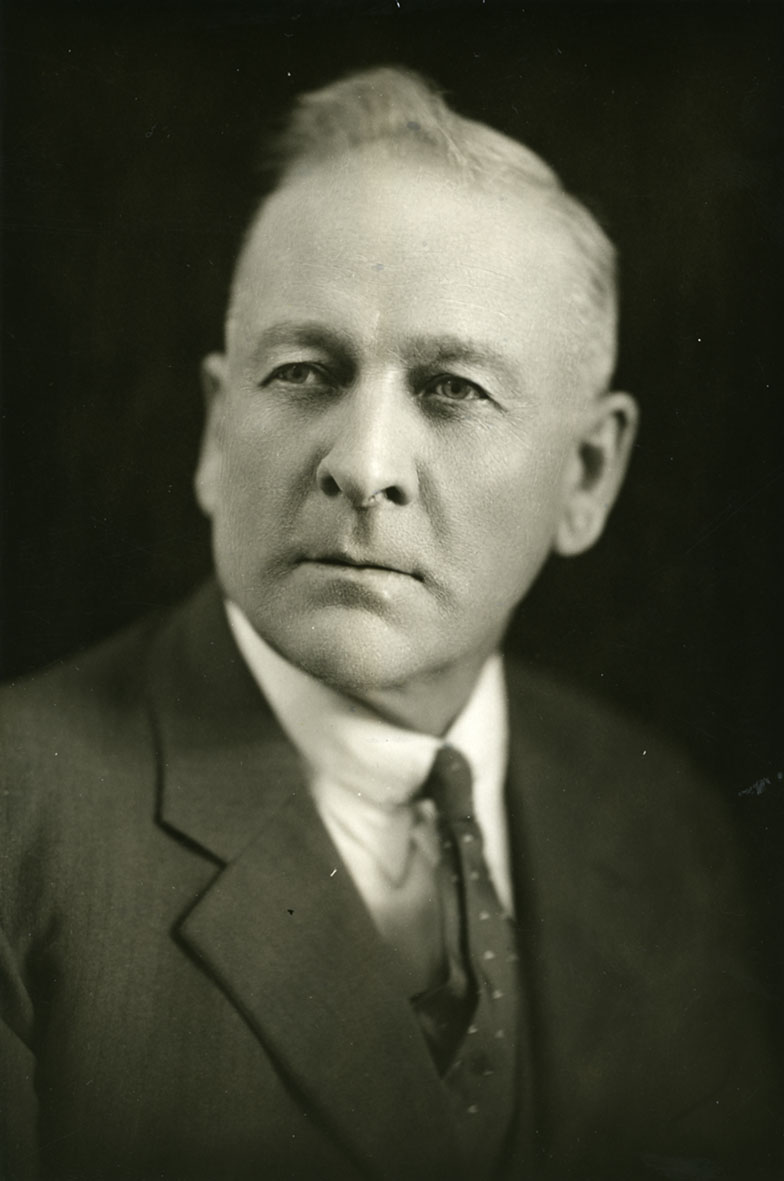

Member of the Legislative Assembly of Alberta
- In office July 18, 1921 – August 22, 1935
- Preceded by: Martin Woolf
- Succeeded by: Nathan Tanner
- Constituency: Cardston

Personal details
- Born: May 21, 1876 Holden, Utah
- Died: July 4, 1959 (aged 83) Lethbridge, Alberta
- Party: United Farmers
- Spouse(s): Mary Ann Snow; Sarah Williams
- Children: Lewis, Alonzo, Alonzo W., Emily, Morris, Dale, Owen, Briant, Woodrow, Elwood, Bryce, Mary, and Mark
- Occupation: Cattle rancher and politician

George Lewis Stringam (May 21, 1876 – July 4, 1959) was a provincial politician and cattle rancher from Alberta, Canada. He served as a member of the Legislative Assembly of Alberta from 1921 to 1935 sitting with the United Farmers caucus in government.

== Early life ==
George Lewis Stringam was born on May 21, 1876, in Holden, Utah, United States. He married Mary Anne Snow on October 17, 1897, and fathered two children. Both children, twins, died at birth on July 21, 1898, and his wife died a few days later due to complications.

Stringam married Sarah Lovina Williams on June 7, 1905. He fathered eleven children with her, two of which died at an early age.

== Political career ==
Stringam ran for a seat to the Alberta Legislature as a United Farmers candidate in the 1921 Alberta general election in the electoral district of Cardston. He defeated incumbent MLA Martin Woolf with a large majority to pick up the seat for his party.

Stringam faced a three way battle running for a second term in the 1926 Alberta general election. Despite losing some of his vote share he easily held his seat.

Stringam ran for a third term in the 1930 Alberta general election. He was returned easily in the two way battle defeating Liberal candidate R. Christie.

The 1935 Alberta general election would see Stringam run for his fourth term in office. He would be defeated finishing a distant second in the three way race by Social Credit candidate Nathan Tanner.

== Later life ==
After losing half his cattle herd in a winter storm in 1936, Stringam retired from cattle ranching and moved to Lethbridge with his wife and the two remaining children the following year in 1937. He became ill and died on July 4, 1959.

His son Bryce Stringam served as a member of the Alberta Legislature from 1955 to 1959.
