= John William Woolf =

Canadian politician

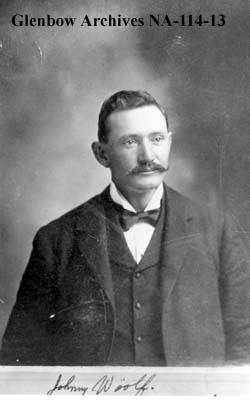

Member of the Legislative Assembly of Alberta
- In office November 9, 1905 – 1912
- Preceded by: New district
- Succeeded by: Martin Woolf
- Constituency: Cardston

Member of the Legislative Assembly of the Northwest Territories
- In office May 21, 1902 – August 31, 1905
- Preceded by: New district
- Succeeded by: District abolished
- Constituency: Cardston

Personal details
- Born: November 27, 1869 Hyde Park, Utah
- Died: February 22, 1950 (aged 80) Salt Lake City, Utah
- Resting place: Salt Lake City Cemetery
- Party: Liberal
- Spouse(s): Lucinda Marie Layne (1888–1913); Quina Austin (ca. 1902–?); Faith Young (?–1950)
- Relations: Martin Woolf (brother)
- Children: William Layne Woolf
- Occupation: Rancher

John William Woolf (November 27, 1869 – February 22, 1950) was an American-born Canadian politician who served in the Legislative Assembly of the Northwest Territories and the Legislative Assembly of Alberta. Born in Utah to polygamous parents, as a young man he moved with them to Cardston in present-day Alberta. There he became a prominent rancher and was elected in the 1902 North-West Territories general election. After Alberta was created in 1905, he was elected in Alberta's first provincial election. He resigned that office in 1912 to return to the United States. His son said that this was because he had taken a second wife and feared prosecution under Canadian anti-polygamy laws. Back in Utah, he and his son pursued a number of business ventures.

== Early life ==
Woolf was born November 27, 1869, in Hyde Park, Utah, the son of John Anthony Woolf II, a polygamous Mormon. While he was a young man, his family fled to Canada to avoid anti-polygamy laws and settled near Cardston, Alberta. In June 1888, he married Lucinda Marie Layne, with whom he had one child, William Layne Woolf, in 1890. Lucinda died in 1913. In Canada, Woolf established a 900 acres (360 ha) ranch, where he remained until he left the country. From this ranch, he supplied the British with horses during the Second Boer War.

Woolf's home, a rock house rated by his son as one of the two finest in Cardston that replaced a one-room log cabin in 1902, was an active social centre. Among those who spent time there was Quina Austin. Woolf's son believed that his father and Austin were polygamously married around 1902 by John W. Taylor.

== Political career ==
Woolf was elected to the Legislative Assembly of the Northwest Territories in election, defeating Heber Simeon Allen in the district of Cardston. He served in the Assembly until 1905, when the province of Alberta was created out of part of the North-West Territories. In keeping with territorial custom, Woolf had served as an independent in the territorial legislature, but federally he was a Liberal. In the debate over whether Alberta's politics should be conducted on an independent basis or along party lines, he was a strong advocate of the latter option.

His side prevailed, and when he ran for the Legislative Assembly of Alberta in the province's inaugural provincial election, it was as a provincial Liberal. He defeated Conservative John F. Parish with the largest majority of any candidate in southern Alberta to win in the Cardston district. Historian L. G. Thomas attributes this margin to Woolf's having "the Mormon vote in [his] pocket".

In the 1909 election, he was re-elected by a reduced margin over Conservative Levi Harker.

During 1910's Alberta and Great Waterways Railway scandal, Woolf was loyal to Premier Alexander Cameron Rutherford. He was rumoured to be Rutherford's choice to succeed Public Works Minister William Henry Cushing, whose resignation had precipitated the scandal, but Rutherford's government collapsed before he appointed any successor. When Arthur Sifton replaced Rutherford as premier, Woolf supported the new premier, even though his approach to the Alberta and Great Waterways question was contrary to Rutherford's old policies, which Woolf had then supported.

In 1910, Woolf bought a house in Salt Lake City in preparation for a return to Utah. His son believed that this was due to the activities of a Protestant minister in Cardston who was investigating and bringing violations of Canada's anti-polygamy laws to the attention of authorities . Beginning in late 1911, he was absent from the legislature, and in 1912 he resigned and returned permanently to the United States. The ensuing by-election returned his brother, Martin Woolf, as his replacement.

== Later life ==
On his return to Utah, Woolf engaged in real estate trading. In 1922, he became, in partnership with his son, the worldwide sales agent for Baldwin Headphones, which had recently gone into receivership. When the company was returned to its original owners following the settlement of its debts, the Woolfs sold the radio products of the British Amplion Corporation. The Bell Telephone Company sued them for patent infringement; William Layne Woolf recalls that he and his father were surprised to discover that Amplion had stolen Bell's designs. They subsequently founded Recordgraph Recording Corp.

Woolf divorced Quina and married for a third time, to Faith Young, with whom he retired to Los Angeles after selling his share of Recordgraph to his son. Several years later, they moved to Spokane, where Faith's daughters were, before returning to Salt Lake City in 1948 where they lived in an apartment in William's house. Woolf died February 22, 1950, of a heart attack.

== Electoral record ==
1902 North-West Territories general election: Cardston
Party	Candidate	Votes	%
Liberal	John William Woolf	176	61.75
Independent	Heber Simeon Allen	109	38.25
Total valid votes		285	100.00
Source(s) "Saskatchewan Executive and Legislative Directory: North-West Territories: Council and Legislative Assembly, 1876–1905" (PDF). Saskatchewan Archives Board. p. 23. Archived from the original (PDF) on September 27, 2011.

1905 Alberta general election: Cardston
Party	Candidate	Votes	%	±%
Liberal	John William Woolf	480	69.57%	–
Conservative	John F. Parrish	210	30.43%	–
Total		690	–	–
Rejected, spoiled and declined		N/A	–	–
Eligible electors / turnout		690	N/A	–
Liberal pickup new district.				
Source(s) Source: "Cardston Official Results 1905 Alberta general election". Alberta Heritage Community Foundation.

1909 Alberta general election: Cardston
Party	Candidate	Votes	%	±%
Liberal	John William Woolf	521	57.44%	-12.12%
Conservative	Levi Harker	386	42.56%	12.12%
Total		907	–	–
Rejected, spoiled and declined		N/A	–	–
Eligible electors / turnout		N/A	N/A	–
Liberal hold		Swing		-12.12%
Source(s) Source: "Cardston Official Results 1909 Alberta general election". Alberta Heritage Community Foundation.
