= Ian Donovan =

Canadian politician

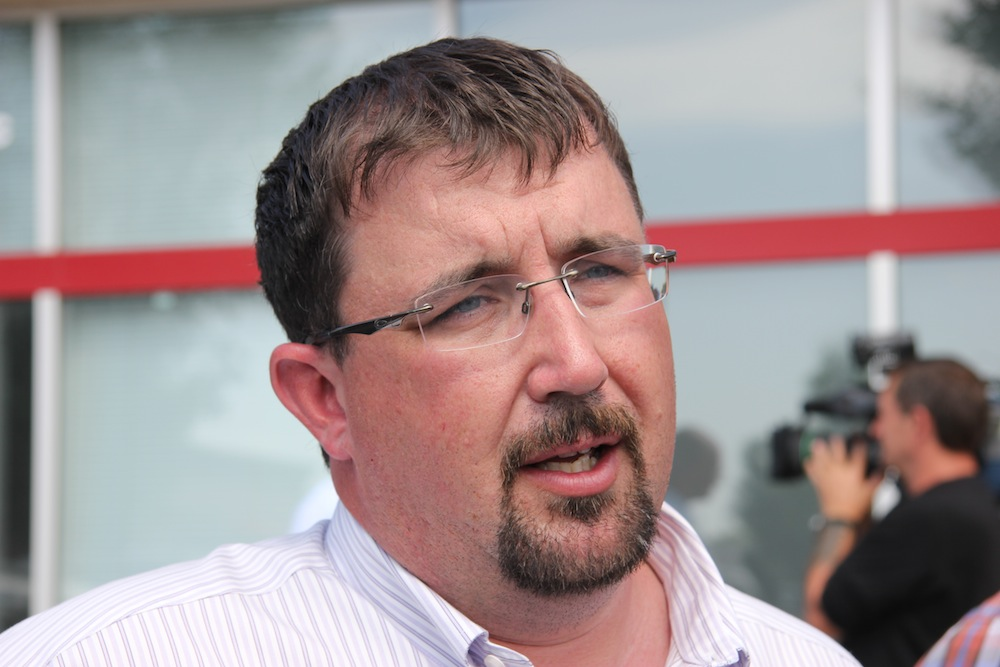

MLA for Little Bow
- In office April 23, 2012 – May 5, 2015
- Preceded by: Barry McFarland
- Succeeded by: Dave Schneider

Personal details
- Born: July 7, 1976 (age 49) High River, Alberta, Canada
- Party: Independent (2019-present)
- Other political affiliations: United Conservative (2017-2019); Progressive Conservative (2014-2017); Wildrose Party (2012-2014)
- Spouse: Serena Donovan
- Occupation: Farmer, MLA
- Website: http://www.iandonovan.ca

Ian Donovan (born July 7, 1976) is a Canadian politician who was an elected member to the Legislative Assembly of Alberta representing the electoral district of Little Bow. Donovan was the Agriculture and Rural Development Critic with the Wildrose Official Opposition, until leaving the caucus in November 2014 to sit as a Progressive Conservative. On May 5, 2015, Donovan lost his reelection bid to Dave Schneider, of the Wildrose.

== Early life ==
Donovan was born in High River and calls the hamlet of Mossleigh home. A graduate of Senator Riley high school, he has operated a grain farm in Mossleigh for 29 years. His wife Serena is now a town councillor. In addition to him running his farm, he is a long-time member and former director of the Blackie Seed Cleaning Association. Donovan is an active member of his community, having been involved with the Lions Club of Mossleigh and Community Futures Highwood, a nonprofit community-owned business development organization, for the past 15 years. He also served as councillor for division 9 of Vulcan County from 1995 until his election to the Legislative Assembly of Alberta, April 23, 2012. He became MLA of the Little Bow Riding. Donovan was appointed to the Standing Committee on Public Accounts on May 24, 2012. He was appointed to the Standing Committee on Alberta's Economic Future on May 28, 2012.

== Political career ==
Donovan started on Vulcan County council at the age of 19. During his 16 years on council he was reeve for two years, chair of public works, agriculture service board, and was on the planning commission. Other boards he was involved with was Blackie and district seed cleaning co-op, Community Futures Highwood, South grow, Vulcan business Development board, Northwest Fire protection association, and the Mossleigh Lions Club.

Donovan ran for and won Little Bow in the Legislative Assembly of Alberta during the 2012 Alberta general election, defeating three other candidates with over half the popular vote. He was only the sixth person to hold the riding since its creation in 1913.

Premier Alison Redford credited Donovan persuading her to allow the Canadian Taxpayers Federation into the pre-budget release lockup, where journalists and stakeholders receive embargoed copies of the budget prior to being released to the public, after he sent the Premier a hand written note in the legislative assembly. Wildrose had previously offered to bring the CTF on a $1 day long contract to the lockup before Redford's decision to allow the group to attend.

On November 24, 2014, Donovan left the Wildrose Party and "crossed the floor" of the Alberta Legislature to join the governing Alberta Progressive Conservative Party caucus due to Donovan claiming that he was impressed with Jim Prentice's leadership and that he could do better for his constituents. A few short weeks later, under the direction of Danielle Smith, asked all of the Wildrose party legislature members to dissolve and join the Progressive Conservative party... The move was interpreted by the media in the context of the recent election of Jim Prentice as Alberta PC leader, the loss by Wildrose of four recent byelections, recent floor crossings by Donovan and Kerry Towle, and controversy over the handling of an equality rights resolution at the Wildrose Party's recent convention. On February 8, 2015, Donovan was acclaimed the candidate for the Progressive Conservative Party for the constituency of Little Bow in the next provincial election when no one else offered to challenge him for the nomination. He lost the general election to Dave Schneider of Wildrose by 12 votes.

In the 2019 election, after Wildrose and the Progressive Conservatives merger, Donovan ran as an independent, and came in a weak third behind the United Conservative and New Democratic candidates, with 4.5% of the vote.

== Electoral record ==
=== 2019 general election ===
2019 Alberta general election: Cardston-Siksika
Party	Candidate	Votes	%	±%
United Conservative	Joseph Schow	11,980	73.55	1.01
New Democratic	Kirby Smith	2,606	16.00	-7.49
Independent	Ian A. Donovan	727	4.46	–
Alberta Party	Casey Douglass	589	3.62	–
Freedom Conservative	Jerry Gautreau	214	1.31	–
Liberal	Cathleen McFarland	173	1.06	–
Total		16,289	–	–
Rejected, spoiled and declined		23	62	8
Eligible electors / turnout		25,050	65.15%	–
United Conservative pickup new district.				
Source(s) Source: "54 - Cardston-Siksika, 2019 Alberta general election". officialresults.elections.ab.ca. Elections Alberta. Alberta. Chief Electoral Officer (2019). 2019 General Election. A Report of the Chief Electoral Officer. Volume II (PDF) (Report). Vol. 2. Edmonton, Alta.: Elections Alberta. pp. 232–236. ISBN 978-1-988620-12-1.

=== 2015 general election ===
2015 Alberta general election: Little Bow
Party	Candidate	Votes	%
Wildrose	David Schneider	4,803	35.4%
Progressive Conservative	Ian Donovan	4,791	35.3%
New Democratic	Bev Muendel-Atherstone	3,359	24.7%
Liberal	Helen McMenamin	379	2.8%
Social Credit	Caleb Van Der Weide	249	1.8%

=== 2012 general election ===
2012 Alberta general election: Little Bow
Party	Candidate	Votes	%	±%
Wildrose	Ian A. Donovan	6,750	54.03%	30.91%
Progressive Conservative	John Kolk	4,502	36.04%	-22.02%
New Democratic	Bev Muendel-Atherstone	767	6.14%	2.51%
Liberal	Everett Tanis	474	3.79%	-8.38%
Total		12,493	–	–
Rejected, spoiled, and declined		52	–	–
Eligible electors / turnout		23,572	53.22%	10.40%
Wildrose gain from Progressive Conservative		Swing		-8.47%
Source(s) Source: "70 - Little Bow, 2012 Alberta general election". officialresults.elections.ab.ca. Elections Alberta.
