= Ted Hinman =

Canadian politician

Edgar Wynder "Ted" Hinman

Member of the Legislative Assembly of Alberta
- In office August 5, 1952 – May 23, 1967
- Preceded by: Nathon Tanner
- Succeeded by: Alvin Bullock
- Constituency: Cardston
- In office August 30, 1971 – March 25, 1975
- Preceded by: Alvin Bullock
- Succeeded by: John Thompson

Minister of Municipal Affairs
- In office December 23, 1954 – August 2, 1955
- Premier: Ernest Manning
- Preceded by: Clarence Gerhart
- Succeeded by: Alfred Hooke

Provincial Treasurer
- In office August 2, 1955 – July 29, 1964
- Premier: Ernest Manning
- Preceded by: Clarence Gerhart
- Succeeded by: Anders Aalborg

Personal details
- Born: August 29, 1906
- Died: May 12, 1994 (aged 87)
- Party: Social Credit
- Occupation: Politician

Edgar Wynder "Ted" Hinman (August 29, 1906 – May 12, 1994) was a provincial politician from Alberta, Canada. He served as member of the Legislative Assembly of Alberta from 1952 to 1967 and again from 1971 to 1975, sitting with the Social Credit caucus in both government and opposition. During his time in office he served in the cabinet of Premier Ernest Manning from 1954 to 1964.

== Early life ==
In 1932, Hinman served as a trustee with future Social Credit MLA Nathan Eldon Tanner on the first voluntary prepaid medical insurance program in Alberta history in Cardston, Alberta.

== Political career ==
He represented Cardston in the legislature for the Alberta Social Credit Party from 1952 to 1967 and returned to the legislature from 1971 to 1975. Hinman was a member of the Church of Jesus Christ of Latter-day Saints.

He served as Provincial Treasurer from 1955 to 1964 and Minister of Municipal Affairs from 1954 to 1955.

Charges were leveled against Hinman and caucus colleague Alfred Hooke for charges of using public office for personal gain by NDP MLA Garth Turcott and party leader Neil Reimer in 1966. He was defeated by Alvin Bullock at a nomination convention shortly after and did not run in the 1967 general election.

In 1967, he was cleared of the charges by Justice Cam Kirby after an eight-month investigation although Kirby scolded him and another cabinet minister for an "imprudent" mixing of public affairs and private business.

== Late life ==
Hinman retired to Raymond, Alberta, and died on May 12, 1994. His grandson Paul Hinman would go on to serve as MLA for Cardston-Taber-Warner from 2004 to 2008.
