= Martin Woolf =

Canadian politician

Martin Woolf Sr.
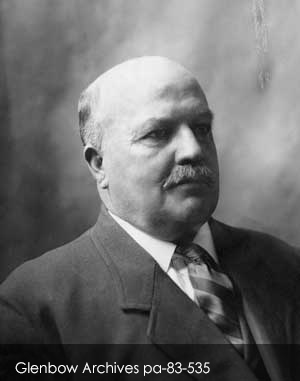

Member of the Legislative Assembly of Alberta
- In office May 27, 1912 – July 18, 1921
- Preceded by: John Woolf
- Succeeded by: George Stringam
- Constituency: Cardston

Personal details
- Born: October 18, 1858 Nephi, Utah, Utah
- Died: August 25, 1928 (aged 69) Cardston, Alberta
- Party: Liberal
- Spouse: Roseltha Hyde
- Occupation: Police magistrate, civil servant and politician

Martin Woolf Sr. (October 18, 1858 – August 25, 1928) was a politician, civil servant and police magistrate from Alberta, Canada. He served as a member of the Legislative Assembly of Alberta from 1912 to 1921 sitting with the Liberal caucus in government.

== Early life ==
Martin Woolf was born on October 18, 1858, at Nephi, Utah, in Juab County. Woolf was parents were Absalom Woolf and Harriet Ann Wood. He was baptized on July 28, 1867, as a member of the Church of Jesus Christ of Latter-day Saints.

Woolf married Roseltha Hyde, on July 23, 1880, at Salt Lake City, Utah; the couple had 9 children.

Woolf moved to Cardston around the turn of the century and served a number of positions in the Cardston County municipal government including Collector of Customs and Police Magistrate. Woolf was a big supporter and advocate of prohibition and helped keep the dry laws on the books in Cardston County. He ran for the provincial legislature in a by-election in 1912.

== Political career ==
Woolf first ran for a seat to the Alberta Legislature in a by-election held on May 27, 1912, as a Liberal candidate in the electoral district of Cardston. The election was hotly contested with Woolf winning by a slim 139 vote plurality to hold the seat for his party.

Woolf would be re-elected to a second term in the 1913 Alberta general election. He held the district by a mere 39 votes.

Woolf ran for his third term in office in the 1917 Alberta general election. He held the district with a comfortable margin of 220 votes. This was the biggest plurality of his career.

Martin attempted to win a fourth term in the Legislative Assembly in the 1921 Alberta general election. He was defeated by United Farmers candidate George Stringam in a two way race by a very large margin.

== Late life and death ==
Woolf died on August 25, 1928, at Cardston, Alberta, Canada, in Cardston Hospital at the age 69. He suffered from a debilitating illness that caused him to go almost completely blind.
