= Cardston (territorial electoral district) =

Former territorial electoral district in the North-West Territories, Canada

Northwest Territories electoral district

Defunct territorial electoral district
- Legislature: Legislative Assembly of the Northwest Territories
- District created: 1902
- District abolished: 1905
- First contested: 1902
- Last contested: 1902

Cardston was a territorial electoral district for the Legislative Assembly of the North-West Territories, Canada. The riding was only contested once, in 1902, prior to the formation of the Province of Alberta in 1905.

== Members of the Legislative Assembly (MLAs) ==
John William Woolf served from 1902 to 1905, being the district's only representative.

== Election results ==
=== 1902 election ===
1902 North-West Territories general election
Party	Candidate	Votes	%
Liberal	John William Woolf	176	61.75
Independent	Heber Simeon Allen	109	38.25
Total valid votes		285	100.00
Source(s) "Saskatchewan Executive and Legislative Directory: North-West Territories: Council and Legislative Assembly, 1876–1905" (PDF). Saskatchewan Archives Board. p. 23. Archived from the original (PDF) on 27 September 2011.

== See also ==
- List of Northwest Territories territorial electoral districts
- Canadian provincial electoral districts
- Cardston Alberta provincial electoral district
