= Cardston (provincial electoral district) =

Defunct provincial electoral district in Alberta, Canada

Coordinates: 49.2°N 113.3°W

Alberta electoral district

Defunct provincial electoral district
- Legislature: Legislative Assembly of Alberta
- District created: 1905
- District abolished: 1993
- First contested: 1905
- Last contested: 1989

Cardston was a provincial electoral district in Alberta, Canada, mandated to return a single member to the Legislative Assembly of Alberta from 1905 to 1993.

== History ==
Members of the Legislative Assembly for Cardston
Assembly	Years	Member	Party
1st	1905–1909	John William Woolf	Liberal
2nd	1909–1912	John William Woolf	Liberal
2nd	1912–1913	Martin Woolf	Liberal
3rd	1913–1917	Martin Woolf	Liberal
4th	1917–1921	Martin Woolf	Liberal
5th	1921–1926	George L. Stringam	United Farmers
6th	1926–1930	George L. Stringam	United Farmers
7th	1930–1935	George L. Stringam	United Farmers
8th	1935–1940	Nathan Eldon Tanner	Social Credit
9th	1940–1944	Nathan Eldon Tanner	Social Credit
10th	1944–1948	Nathan Eldon Tanner	Social Credit
11th	1948–1952	Nathan Eldon Tanner	Social Credit
12th	1952–1955	Edgar W. Hinman	Social Credit
13th	1955–1959	Edgar W. Hinman	Social Credit
14th	1959–1963	Edgar W. Hinman	Social Credit
15th	1963–1967	Edgar W. Hinman	Social Credit
16th	1967–1971	Alvin F. Bullock	Social Credit
17th	1971–1975	Edgar W. Hinman	Social Credit
18th	1975–1979	John Thompson	Progressive Conservative
19th	1979–1982	John Thompson	Progressive Conservative
20th	1982–1986	John Thompson	Progressive Conservative
21st	1986–1989	Jack Ady	Progressive Conservative
22nd	1989–1993	Jack Ady	Progressive Conservative
See Cardston-Chief Mountain electoral district from 1993-1997

Cardston was one of the original 25 electoral districts contested in the 1905 Alberta general election upon Alberta becoming a province in September 1905. The district was carried over from the old Cardston electoral district which returned a member to the Legislative Assembly of the North-West Territories from 1902 to 1905. The member for the North-West Territories seat, John William Woolf was elected in the 1905 Alberta general election.

The riding has always occupied the most southern portion of the province along the Canada–United States border.

From 1924 to 1956, the district used instant-runoff voting to elect its MLA.

The Cardston electoral district was abolished in the 1993 electoral boundary re-distribution, with the borders of the Pincher Creek-Crowsnest electoral district shifted south into Cardston, and the district was renamed Cardston-Chief Mountain.

The riding was named after the Town of Cardston, and this region is considered one of the most conservative in the province.

=== Boundary history ===
(2) Cardston 1905 Boundaries
Bordering Districts
North	East	West	South
Lethbridge	Medicine Hat	Macleod, Pincher Creek	None
riding map goes here		map in relation to other districts in Alberta goes here	
Legal description from An Act to establish and provide for the Government of the Province of Alberta 1905.
The electoral division of Cardston, bounded as follows:– Commencing at the southern boundary of the said province of Alberta where it is intersected by the meridian between the 10th and 11th ranges, west of the 4th meridian; thence northerly along the said meridian between the 10th and 11th ranges to the north boundary of the 5th township; thence westerly along the north boundary of the 5th township to the St. Mary river; thence along the St. Mary river up stream to the south boundary of the Blood Indian Reserve; thence westerly along the said south boundary of the Blood Indian Reserve to the meridian between the 27th and 28th ranges west of the 4th meridian; thence southerly along the said meridian between the 27th and 28th ranges to the north boundary of the 2nd township; thence westerly along the north boundary of the 2nd townships to the meridian between the 29th and 30th ranges west of the 4th meridian; thence southerly along the said meridian between the 29th and 30th ranges to the southern shore of the Waterton Lakes; thence in a westerly and southerly direction and following the southerly and eastern shores of the said Waterton Lakes; thence in a westerly and southerly direction and following the southerly and eastern shores of the said Waterton Lakes to the southern boundary of the said province of Alberta; thence easterly along the said southern boundary of the province of Alberta to the point of commencement.
Note: Original electoral boundaries

== Election results ==
=== 1905 ===
The 1905 election was between Liberal candidate John William Woolf and Conservative candidate John Parrish. Woolf was well known rancher and politician in the area. He had served as the district representative in the North-West Territories Legislature from 1902 to 1905. Woolf also served briefly on the local government as a municipal councilor in the town of Cardston. Woolf won the district on election day easily defeating Parish with a landslide taking nearly 70% of the popular vote.

1905 Alberta general election
Party	Candidate	Votes	%	±%
Liberal	John William Woolf	480	69.57%	–
Conservative	John F. Parrish	210	30.43%	–
Total		690	–	–
Rejected, spoiled and declined		N/A	–	–
Eligible electors / turnout		690	N/A	–
Liberal pickup new district.				
Source(s) Source: "Cardston Official Results 1905 Alberta general election". Alberta Heritage Community Foundation.

=== 1909 ===
1909 Alberta general election
Party	Candidate	Votes	%	±%
Liberal	John William Woolf	521	57.44%	-12.12%
Conservative	Levi Harker	386	42.56%	12.12%
Total		907	–	–
Rejected, spoiled and declined		N/A	–	–
Eligible electors / turnout		N/A	N/A	–
Liberal hold		Swing		-12.12%
Source(s) Source: "Cardston Official Results 1909 Alberta general election". Alberta Heritage Community Foundation.

=== 1912 by-election ===
Alberta provincial by-election, May 27, 1912 Upon John William Woolf's resignation
Party	Candidate	Votes	%	±%
Liberal	Martin Woolf	671	55.78%	-1.68%
Conservative	John F. Parrish	532	44.22%	1.68%
Total		1,203	–	–
Rejected, spoiled and declined		N/A	–	–
Eligible electors / turnout		N/A	N/A	–
Liberal hold		Swing		–
Source(s) "By-elections". elections.ab.ca. Elections Alberta.

=== 1913 ===
1913 Alberta general election
Party	Candidate	Votes	%
Liberal	Martin Woolf	518	51.96%
Conservative	C. Jensen	479	48.04%
Total		997	
Source(s) Source: "Cardston Official Results 1913 Alberta general election". Alberta Heritage Community Foundation.

=== 1917 ===
1917 Alberta general election
Party	Candidate	Votes	%	±%
Liberal	Martin Woolf	972	56.38%	4.42%
Conservative	W. G. Smith	752	43.62%	-4.42%
Total		1,724	–	–
Rejected, spoiled and declined		N/A	–	–
Eligible electors / turnout		2,213	77.90%	0.91%
Liberal hold		Swing		4.42%
Source(s) Source: "Cardston Official Results 1917 Alberta general election". Alberta Heritage Community Foundation.

=== 1921 ===
1921 Alberta general election
Party	Candidate	Votes	%	±%
United Farmers	George L. Stringham	1,340	68.54%	–
Liberal	Martin Woolf	615	31.46%	-24.92%
Total		1,955	–	–
Rejected, spoiled and declined		N/A	–	–
Eligible electors / turnout		2,465	79.31%	1.41%
United Farmers gain from Liberal		Swing		12.16%
Source(s) Source: "Cardston Official Results 1921 Alberta general election". Alberta Heritage Community Foundation.

=== 1926 ===
1926 Alberta general election
Party	Candidate	Votes	%	±%
United Farmers	George L. Stringham	1,328	55.20%	-13.35%
Liberal	W. H. Caldwell	598	24.85%	-6.60%
Conservative	J. Y. Card	480	19.95%	–
Total		2,406	–	–
Rejected, spoiled and declined		126	–	–
Eligible electors / turnout		3,269	77.45%	-1.86%
United Farmers hold		Swing		-3.37%
Source(s) Source: "Cardston Official Results 1926 Alberta general election". Alberta Heritage Community Foundation.

=== 1930 ===
1930 Alberta general election
Party	Candidate	Votes	%	±%
United Farmers	George L. Stringham	1,364	62.31%	7.12%
Liberal	R. Christie	825	37.69%	12.83%
Total		2,189	–	–
Rejected, spoiled and declined		48	–	–
Eligible electors / turnout		3,420	65.41%	-12.05%
United Farmers hold		Swing		-2.86%
Source(s) Source: "Cardston Official Results 1930 Alberta general election". Alberta Heritage Community Foundation.

=== 1935 ===
1935 Alberta general election
Party	Candidate	Votes	%	±%
Social Credit	Nathan Eldon Tanner	2,027	66.18%	–
United Farmers	George L. Stringham	565	18.45%	-43.87%
Liberal	D. O. Wight	471	15.38%	-22.31%
Total		3,063	–	–
Rejected, spoiled and declined		129	–	–
Eligible electors / turnout		3,344	95.45%	30.05%
Social Credit gain from United Farmers		Swing		11.55%
Source(s) Source: "Cardston Official Results 1935 Alberta general election". Alberta Heritage Community Foundation.

=== 1940 ===
1940 Alberta general election
Party	Candidate	Votes	%	±%
Social Credit	Nathan Eldon Tanner	2,160	54.44%	-11.74%
Independent	S. H. Nelson	1,808	45.56%	–
Total		3,968	–	–
Rejected, spoiled and declined		79	–	–
Eligible electors / turnout		4,941	81.91%	-13.55%
Social Credit hold		Swing		-19.43%
Source(s) Source: "Cardston Official Results 1940 Alberta general election". Alberta Heritage Community Foundation.

=== 1944 ===
1944 Alberta general election
Party	Candidate	Votes	%	±%
Social Credit	Nathan Eldon Tanner	2,104	64.44%	10.01%
Independent	William G. Matson	592	18.13%	-27.43%
Co-operative Commonwealth	Edward Leavitt	569	17.43%	–
Total		3,265	–	–
Rejected, spoiled and declined		20	–	–
Eligible electors / turnout		4,549	72.21%	-9.69%
Social Credit hold		Swing		18.72%
Source(s) Source: "Cardston Official Results 1944 Alberta general election". Alberta Heritage Community Foundation.

=== 1948 ===
1948 Alberta general election
Party	Candidate	Votes	%	±%
Social Credit	Nathan Eldon Tanner	1,981	67.73%	3.29%
Liberal	Briant W. Stringam	944	32.27%	–
Total		2,925	–	–
Rejected, spoiled and declined		127	–	–
Eligible electors / turnout		5,089	59.97%	-12.24%
Social Credit hold		Swing		-5.43%
Source(s) Source: "Cardston Official Results 1948 Alberta general election". Alberta Heritage Community Foundation.

=== 1952 ===
1952 Alberta general election
Party	Candidate	Votes	%	±%
Social Credit	Edgar W. Hinman	2,011	76.15%	8.42%
Liberal	Gordon Gregson	630	23.85%	-8.42%
Total		2,641	–	–
Rejected, spoiled and declined		99	–	–
Eligible electors / turnout		4,891	56.02%	-3.95%
Social Credit hold		Swing		8.42%
Source(s) Source: "Cardston Official Results 1952 Alberta general election". Alberta Heritage Community Foundation.

=== 1955 ===
1955 Alberta general election
Party	Candidate	Votes	%	±%
Social Credit	Edgar W. Hinman	1,813	64.80%	-11.35%
Liberal	John F. Webster	985	35.20%	11.35%
Total		2,798	–	–
Rejected, spoiled and declined		81	–	–
Eligible electors / turnout		4,661	61.77%	5.75%
Social Credit hold		Swing		-11.35%
Source(s) Source: "Cardston Official Results 1955 Alberta general election". Alberta Heritage Community Foundation.

=== 1959 ===
1959 Alberta general election
Party	Candidate	Votes	%	±%
Social Credit	Edgar W. Hinman	2,205	73.60%	8.80%
Progressive Conservative	John A. Spencer	791	26.40%	–
Total		2,996	–	–
Rejected, spoiled and declined		7	–	–
Eligible electors / turnout		4,537	66.19%	4.42%
Social Credit hold		Swing		8.80%
Source(s) Source: "Cardston Official Results 1959 Alberta general election". Alberta Heritage Community Foundation.

=== 1963 ===
1963 Alberta general election
Party	Candidate	Votes	%	±%
Social Credit	Edgar W. Hinman	2,527	68.08%	-5.52%
Liberal	John F. Webster	1,035	27.88%	–
New Democratic	Colin H. Holt	150	4.04%	–
Total		3,712	–	–
Rejected, spoiled and declined		4	–	–
Eligible electors / turnout		6,623	56.11%	-10.08%
Social Credit hold		Swing		-3.50%
Source(s) Source: "Cardston Official Results 1963 Alberta general election". Alberta Heritage Community Foundation.

=== 1967 ===
1967 Alberta general election
Party	Candidate	Votes	%	±%
Social Credit	Alvin F. Bullock	2,120	47.23%	-20.85%
Progressive Conservative	Larry L. Lang	1,692	37.69%	–
Independent	Robert D. Burt	573	12.76%	–
New Democratic	Leslie N. Howard	104	2.32%	-1.72%
Total		4,489	–	–
Rejected, spoiled and declined		11	–	–
Eligible electors / turnout		7,251	62.06%	5.95%
Social Credit hold		Swing		-15.33%
Source(s) Source: "Cardston Official Results 1967 Alberta general election". Alberta Heritage Community Foundation.

=== 1971 ===
1971 Alberta general election
Party	Candidate	Votes	%	±%
Social Credit	Edgar W. Hinman	2,831	54.20%	6.98%
Progressive Conservative	Larry L. Lang	2,392	45.80%	8.11%
Total		5,223	–	–
Rejected, spoiled and declined		63	–	–
Eligible electors / turnout		8,975	58.90%	-3.16%
Social Credit hold		Swing		-0.56%
Source(s) Source: "Cardston Official Results 1971 Alberta general election". Alberta Heritage Community Foundation.

=== 1975 ===
1975 Alberta general election
Party	Candidate	Votes	%	±%
Progressive Conservative	John Thompson	2,899	59.90%	14.10%
Social Credit	Roy Sprackman	1,826	37.73%	-16.48%
New Democratic	Kelty Paul	115	2.38%	–
Total		4,840	–	–
Rejected, spoiled and declined		10	–	–
Eligible electors / turnout		8,538	56.80%	-2.09%
Progressive Conservative gain from Social Credit		Swing		6.88%
Source(s) Source: "Cardston Official Results 1975 Alberta general election". Alberta Heritage Community Foundation.

=== 1979 ===
1979 Alberta general election
Party	Candidate	Votes	%	±%
Progressive Conservative	John Thompson	2,832	53.99%	-5.90%
Social Credit	Broyce G. Jacobs	2,196	41.87%	4.14%
Liberal	Paul Shaw	115	2.19%	–
New Democratic	Rosemarie M. Buchanan	102	1.94%	-0.43%
Total		5,245	–	–
Rejected, spoiled and declined		10	–	–
Eligible electors / turnout		8,944	58.75%	1.95%
Progressive Conservative hold		Swing		-5.02%
Source(s) Source: "Cardston Official Results 1979 Alberta general election". Alberta Heritage Community Foundation.

=== 1982 ===
1982 Alberta general election
Party	Candidate	Votes	%	±%
Progressive Conservative	John Thompson	3,738	59.36%	5.37%
Western Canada Concept	Steve Pinchak	2,309	36.67%	–
New Democratic	Leslie Howard	250	3.97%	2.03%
Total		6,297	–	–
Rejected, spoiled and declined		24	–	–
Eligible electors / turnout		9,761	64.76%	6.00%
Progressive Conservative hold		Swing		5.28%
Source(s) Source: "Cardston Official Results 1982 Alberta general election". Alberta Heritage Community Foundation.

=== 1986 ===
1986 Alberta general election
Party	Candidate	Votes	%	±%
Progressive Conservative	Jack Ady	2,679	60.28%	0.92%
Independent	Steve Pinchak	1,376	30.96%	–
New Democratic	Cynthia Cunningham	389	8.75%	4.78%
Total		4,444	–	–
Rejected, spoiled and declined		15	–	–
Eligible electors / turnout		9,641	46.25%	-18.51%
Progressive Conservative hold		Swing		3.31%
Source(s) Source: "Cardston Official Results 1986 Alberta general election". Alberta Heritage Community Foundation.

=== 1989 ===
1989 Alberta general election
Party	Candidate	Votes	%	±%
Progressive Conservative	Jack Ady	3,483	74.63%	14.35%
Liberal	Beth Wendorff	667	14.29%	–
New Democratic	Don Ferguson	517	11.08%	2.32%
Total		4,667	–	–
Rejected, spoiled and declined		13	–	–
Eligible electors / turnout		8,105	57.74%	11.49%
Progressive Conservative hold		Swing		15.51%
Source(s) Source: "Cardston Official Results 1989 Alberta general election". Alberta Heritage Community Foundation.

== Plebiscite results ==
=== 1948 electrification plebiscite ===
District results from the first province wide plebiscite on electricity regulation.

Option A	Option B
Are you in favour of the generation and distribution of electricity being continued by the Power Companies?	Are you in favour of the generation and distribution of electricity being made a publicly owned utility administered by the Alberta Government Power Commission?
1,268 votes (46.00%)	1,488 votes (54.00%)
Province wide result: Option A passed.

=== 1957 liquor plebiscite ===
1957 Alberta liquor plebiscite results: Cardston
Question A: Do you approve additional types of outlets for the sale of beer, wine and spirituous liquor subject to a local vote?
Ballot choice	Votes	%
No	1,786	79.06%
Yes	473	20.94%
Total votes	2,259	100%
Rejected, spoiled and declined	13	
4,296 eligible electors, turnout 52.89%%

On October 30, 1957, a stand-alone plebiscite was held province wide in all 50 of the provincial electoral districts in Alberta. The government decided to consult Alberta voters to decide on liquor sales and mixed drinking after a divisive debate in the Legislature. The plebiscite was intended to deal with the growing demand for reforming antiquated liquor control laws.

The plebiscite was conducted in two parts. Question A asked in all districts, asked the voters if the sale of liquor should be expanded in Alberta, while Question B asked in a handful of districts within the corporate limits of Calgary and Edmonton asked if men and woman were allowed to drink together in establishments.

Province wide Question A of the plebiscite passed in 33 of the 50 districts while Question B passed in all five districts. Cardston recorded the strongest vote in the province against expanded sale of liquor, this was likely due to the strong Mormon communities in the district, which had made Cardston a dry city since 1904. The district also recorded a strong voter turnout. It was well above the province wide average of 46 percent.

Official district returns were released to the public on December 31, 1957. At first the Social Credit government said it did not consider the results binding, but soon the government repealed the existing liquor legislation and introduced an entirely new Liquor Act.

A majority in Cardston were opposed and prohibition was in effect in the town until 2023. Municipal districts lying inside electoral districts that voted against expanded liquor sales such as Cardston were designated Local Option Zones by the Alberta Liquor Control Board and considered effective dry zones, business owners that wanted a license had to petition for a binding municipal plebiscite in order to be granted a license.

== See also ==
- List of Alberta provincial electoral districts
- Canadian provincial electoral districts
