= Ruth Scalplock =

Ruth Scalp Lock is a Siksika First Nation woman who founded a domestic violence shelter in Calgary.

She was placed into the Canadian Indian residential school system for fourteen years. In 1974, Scalp Lock experienced a spiritual awakening where she decided to change her life by embracing healing. Scalp Lock has dedicated over 40 years of her life to helping her community members and urban Indigenous families in Calgary, Alberta. Scalp Lock was one of the first Indigenous women in southern Alberta to make a connection between Indigenous families and social workers by establishing trust and concern through working with the families in order to keep the family circle strong.

== Awo Taan Native Healing Lodge ==
In 1986, Scalp Lock came together with a group of concerned people to make a safe place for Indigenous women and children escaping from abuse and in need of shelter. It was Scalp Lock’s dream to open a Native Women’s Shelter in Calgary. Finding a location for and then opening the shelter took many years and had the support of Mayor Alder, Ralph Klein, and many other local leaders. In 2007, the shelter was renamed Awo Tann Healing Lodge, "Awo Taan" meaning 'shield', which was given to Scalp Lock's grandmother, Margaret Bad Boy and her husband at a Sundance in 1930. In a ceremonial gathering, Bad Boy gave Scalp Lock the name Awo Taanaakii (Shield Woman), a name which recognizes her role as a protector to women and children. The lodge is a shelter uniquely designed for Indigenous families because of its traditional and spiritual healing practices, such as the medicine wheel, speaking with Elders, and smudging
