= Famine =

Widespread scarcity of food

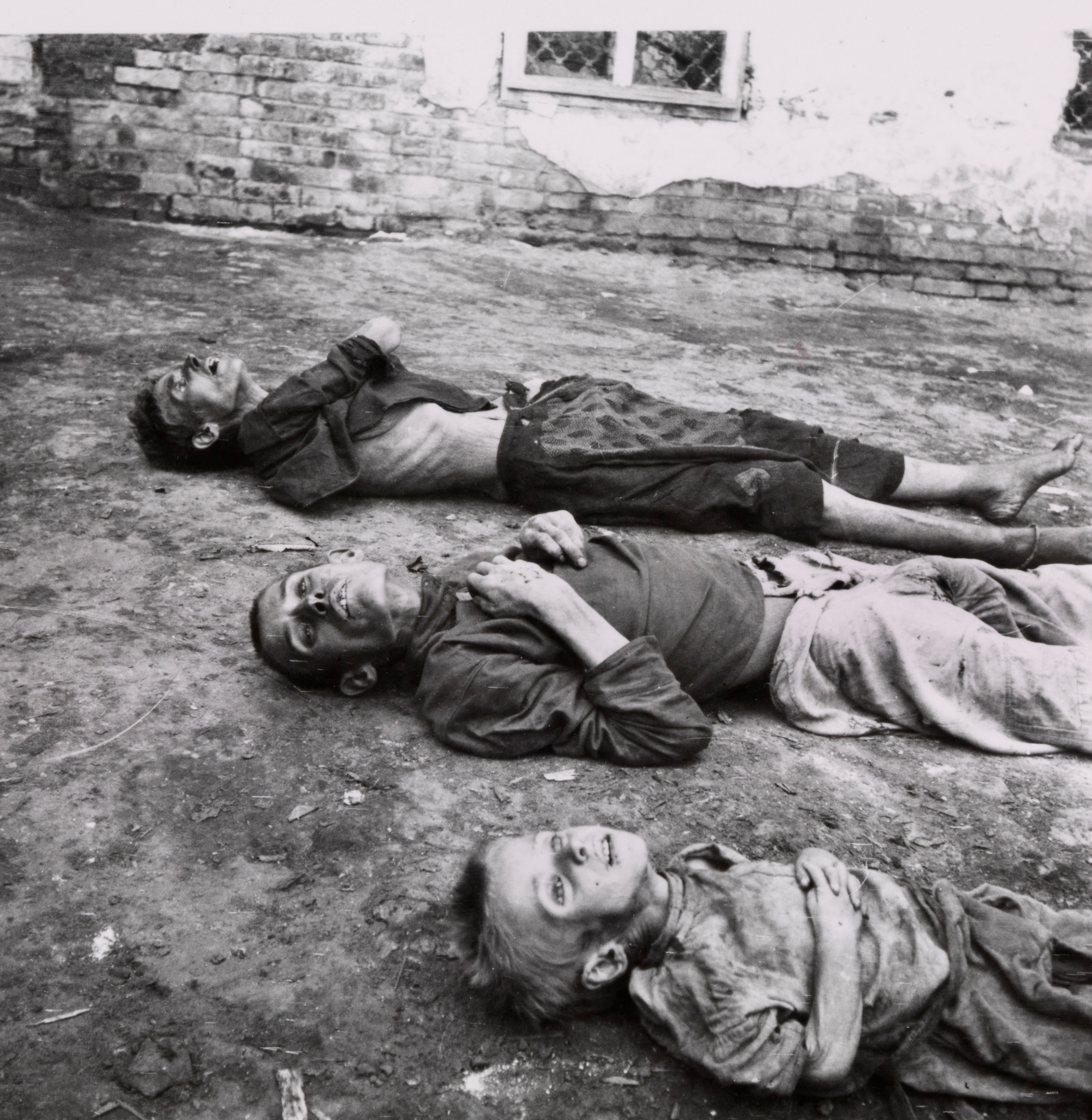
Two men and a child, all dead from starvation during the Russian famine of 1921–1922

A famine is a widespread scarcity of food caused by several possible factors, including, but not limited to: war, natural disasters, crop failure, widespread poverty, an economic catastrophe or government policies. This phenomenon is usually accompanied or followed by regional malnutrition, starvation, epidemic, and increased mortality. Every inhabited continent in the world has experienced a period of famine throughout history. In historical and modern data, the Americas have been among the least famine-affected regions globally. During the 19th and 20th centuries, China, India, Europe, and the Middle East suffered the greatest number of fatalities due to famine. Deaths caused by famine declined sharply beginning in the 1970s, with numbers falling further since 2000. In 2011, millions in East Africa were affected by famine. As of 2025, Haiti, Afghanistan, Sudan, Yemen, Gaza, and Syria have experienced famine.

== Definitions ==
According to the United Nations World Food Programme, famine is declared when malnutrition is widespread, and when people have started dying from starvation through lack of access to sufficient, nutritious food. The Integrated Food Security Phase Classification criteria define Phase 5 famine of acute food insecurity as occurring when all three of the following situations exist at the same time:

- At least 20% of households in an area face extreme food shortages with a limited ability to cope;
- The prevalence of acute malnutrition in children exceeds 30%;
- The death rate exceeds two people per 10,000 per day.

If only the first condition is met, it can be stated that more than 20% of the population is in Phase 5 (Catastrophe), but the area cannot be officially declared a famine. Where two of the three thresholds are exceeded and the third is also considered likely to have been met, the situation is classified as a famine with reasonable evidence.

The declaration of a famine carries no binding obligations on the UN or member states, but serves to focus global attention on the problem. Once a situation has been technically classified as a famine, governments and international agencies can declare it formally. In complex humanitarian crises, this poses significant challenges due to the strictness of technical criteria and the political implications of the declaration.

== History ==
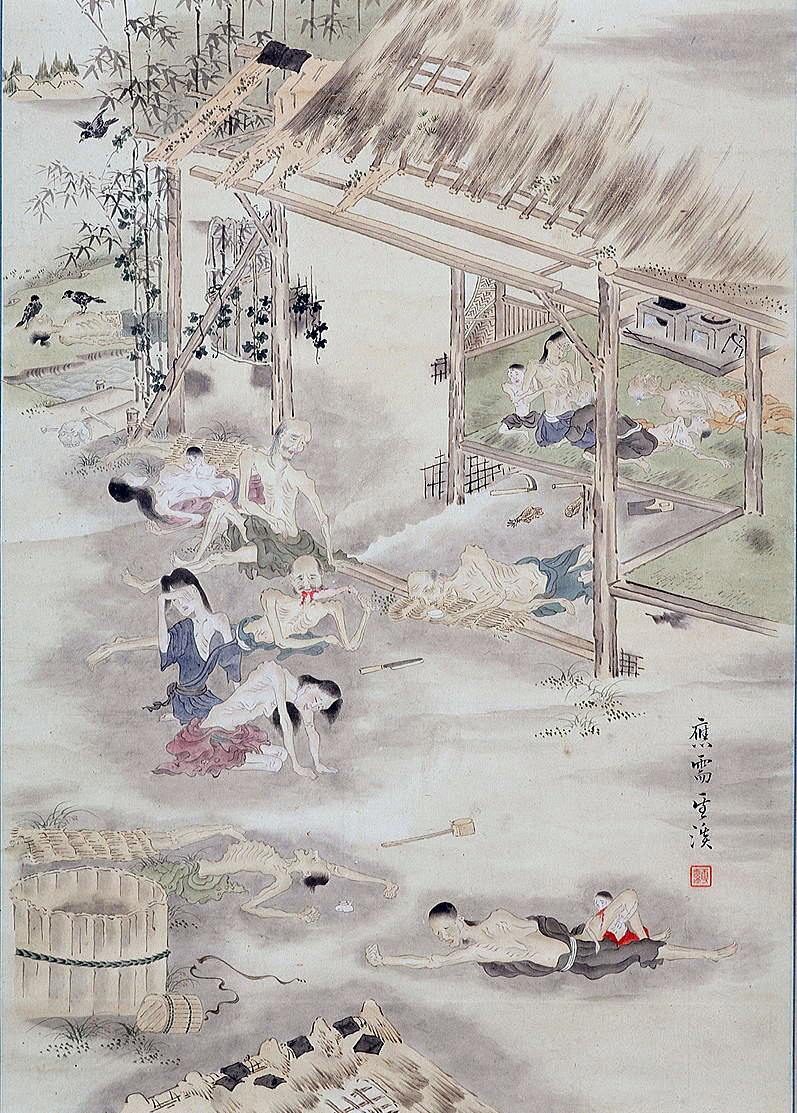
Great Tenmei famine in Japan (1782–1788)

The cyclical occurrence of famine has been a mainstay of societies engaged in subsistence agriculture since the dawn of agriculture itself. The frequency and intensity of famine has fluctuated throughout history, depending on changes in food demand, such as population growth, and supply-side shifts caused by changing climatic conditions.

=== Decline of famine ===
In the 16th and 17th centuries, the feudal system began to break down, and more prosperous farmers began to enclose their own land and improve their yields to sell the surplus crops for a profit. These capitalist landowners paid their labourers with money, thereby increasing the commercialization of rural society. In the emerging competitive labour market, better techniques for the improvement of labour productivity were increasingly valued and rewarded. It was in the farmer's interest to produce as much as possible on their land, in order to sell it to areas that demanded their produce. They produced guaranteed surpluses of their crop every year if they could.

Subsistence peasants were also increasingly forced to commercialize their activities because of increasing taxes. Taxes that had to be paid to central governments in money, forced the peasants to produce crops intended for sale at market. This often meant producing industrial crops alongside subsistence crops, and forced peasants to increase their production in order to meet both their subsistence requirements as well as their tax obligations. Peasants also used the new money to purchase manufactured goods. The agricultural and social developments encouraging increased food production were gradually taking place throughout the 16th century, but took off in the early 17th century.

By the 1590s, these trends were sufficiently developed in the rich and commercialized province of Holland to allow its population to withstand a general outbreak of famine in Western Europe at that time. By that time, the Netherlands had one of the most commercialized agricultural systems in Europe. They grew many industrial crops such as flax, hemp and hops. Agriculture became increasingly specialized and efficient. The efficiency of Dutch agriculture allowed for much more rapid urbanization in the late sixteenth and early seventeenth centuries than anywhere else in Europe. As a result, productivity and wealth increased, allowing the Netherlands to maintain a steady food supply.

By 1650, English agriculture had also become commercialized on a much wider scale. The last peacetime famine in England was in 1623–24. There were still periods of hunger, as in the Netherlands, but no more famines ever occurred. Common areas for pasture were enclosed for private use and large scale, efficient farms were consolidated. Other technical developments included the draining of marshes, more efficient field use patterns, and the wider introduction of industrial crops. These agricultural developments led to wider prosperity in England and increasing urbanization. By the end of the 17th century, English agriculture was the most productive in Europe. In both England and the Netherlands, the population stabilized between 1650 and 1750, the same time period in which the sweeping changes to agriculture occurred. Famine still occurred in other parts of Europe, however. In Eastern Europe, famines occurred as late as the twentieth century.

=== Attempts at famine alleviation ===
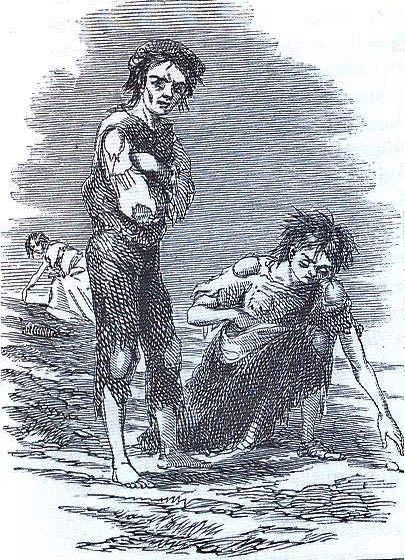
Skibbereen, Ireland during the Great Famine, 1847 illustration by James Mahony for the Illustrated London News

In pre-industrial Europe, preventing famine and ensuring timely food supplies was one of the chief concerns of many governments, as famines could lead to revolt and other forms of social disruption. However, existing levels of trade, infrastructure, and bureaucracy provided limited options, and were typically insufficient to effect real relief.

By the mid-19th century and the onset of the Industrial Revolution, it became possible for governments to alleviate the effects of famine through price controls, large scale importation of food products from foreign markets, stockpiling, rationing, regulation of production and charity. The Great Famine of 1845 in Ireland was one of the first famines to feature such intervention, although the government response was often lackluster. The initial response of the British government to the early phase of the famine was "prompt and relatively successful", according to F. S. L. Lyons. Confronted by widespread crop failure in the autumn of 1845, Prime Minister Sir Robert Peel purchased £100,000 worth of maize and cornmeal secretly from America. Baring Brothers & Co initially acted as purchasing agents for the Prime Minister. The government hoped that they would not "stifle private enterprise" and that their actions would not act as a disincentive to local relief efforts. Due to weather conditions, the first shipment did not arrive in Ireland until the beginning of February 1846. The maize corn was then re-sold for a penny a pound.

In 1846, Peel moved to repeal the Corn Laws, tariffs on grain which kept the price of bread artificially high. The famine situation worsened during 1846 and the repeal of the Corn Laws in that year did little to help the starving Irish; the measure split the Conservative Party, leading to the fall of Peel's ministry. In March, Peel set up a programme of public works in Ireland.

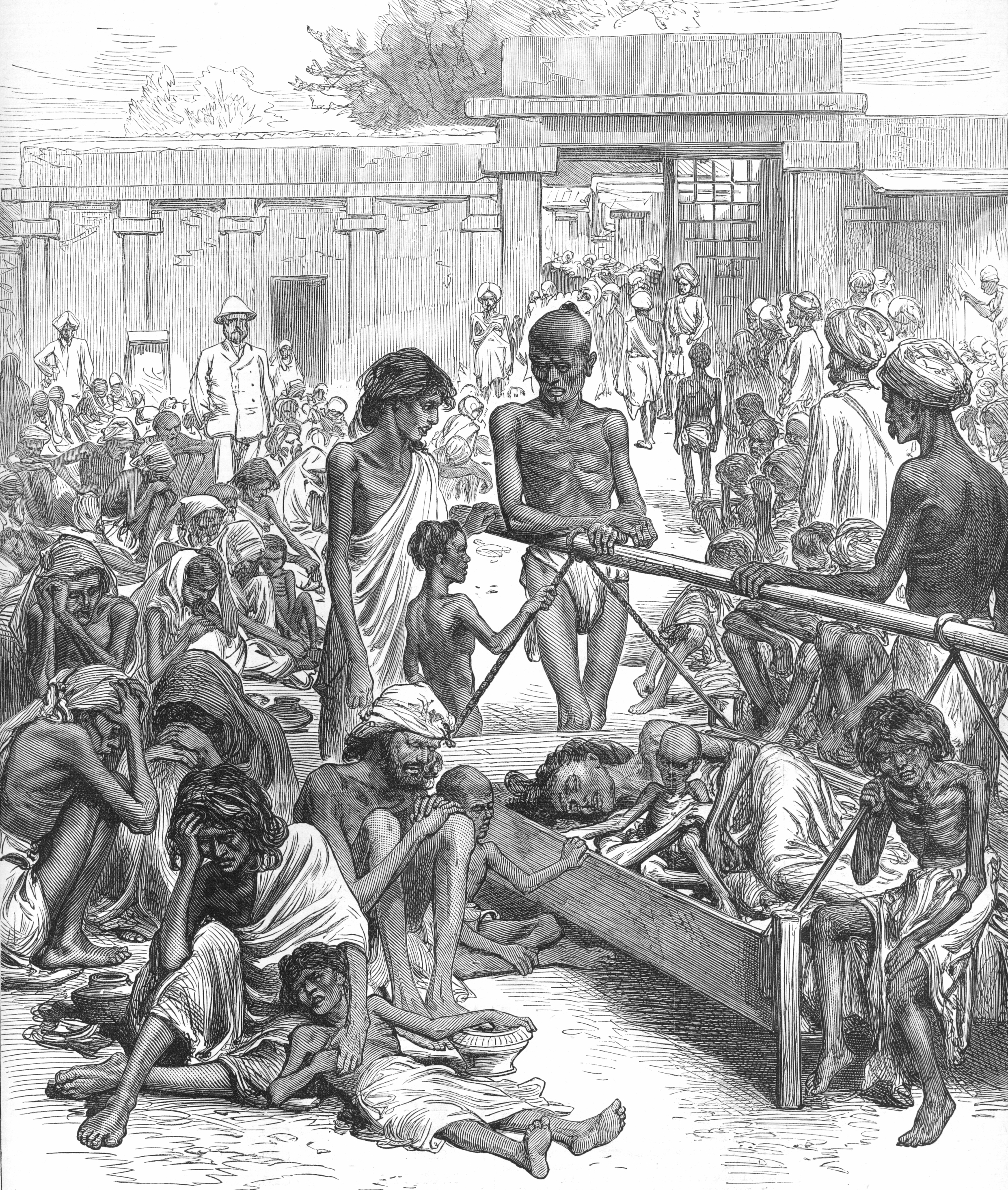
People waiting for famine relief in Bangalore, India (from the Illustrated London News, 1877)

Despite this promising start, the measures undertaken by Peel's successor, Lord John Russell, proved comparatively "inadequate" as the crisis deepened. Russell's ministry introduced public works projects, which by December 1846 employed some half million Irish and proved impossible to administer. The government was influenced by a laissez-faire belief that the market would provide the food needed. It halted government food and relief works, and turned to a mixture of "indoor" and "outdoor" direct relief; the former administered in workhouses through the Poor Law, the latter through soup kitchens.

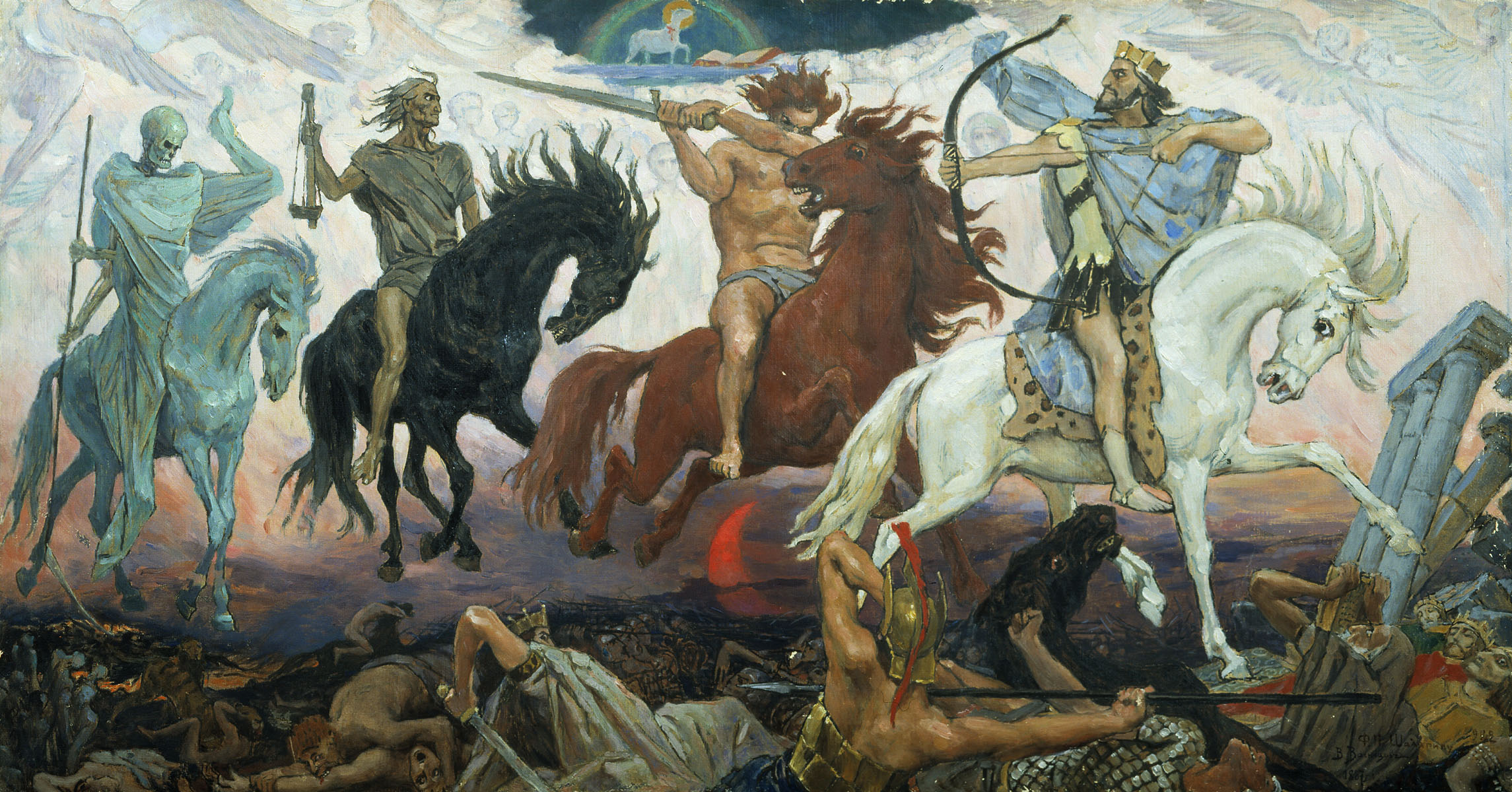
Four Horsemen of the Apocalypse, an 1887 painting by Russian artist Viktor Vasnetsov. Depicted from left to right are Death, Famine, War, and Conquest.

A systematic attempt at creating the necessary regulatory framework for dealing with famine was developed by the British Raj in the 1880s. In order to comprehensively address the issue of famine, the British created an Indian Famine commission to recommend steps that the government would be required to take in the event of a famine. The Famine Commission issued a series of government guidelines and regulations on how to respond to famines and food shortages called the Famine Code. The famine code was also one of the first attempts to scientifically predict famine in order to mitigate its effects. These were finally passed into law in 1883 under Lord Ripon.

The Code introduced the first famine scale: three levels of food insecurity were defined: near-scarcity, scarcity, and famine. "Scarcity" was defined as three successive years of crop failure, crop yields of one-third or one-half normal, and large populations in distress. "Famine" further included a rise in food prices above 140% of "normal", the movement of people in search of food, and widespread mortality. The Commission identified that the loss of wages from lack of employment of agricultural labourers and artisans were the cause of famines. The Famine Code applied a strategy of generating employment for these sections of the population and relied on open-ended public works to do so.

=== 20th century ===
During the 20th century, an estimated 70 to 120 million people died from famines across the world, of whom over half died in China, with an estimated 30 million dying during the famine of 1958–1961, up to 10 million in the Chinese famine of 1928–1930, and over two million in the Chinese famine of 1942–1943, and millions more lost in famines in North and East China. The USSR lost 8 million claimed by the Soviet famine of 1930–1933, over a million in both the Soviet famine of 1946–1947 and Siege of Leningrad, the 5 million in the Russian famine of 1921–1922, and others famines. Java suffered 2.5 million deaths under Japanese occupation during World War Two. The other most notable famine of the century was the Bengal famine of 1943, resulting both from the Japanese occupation of Burma, resulting in an influx of refugees, and blocking Burmese grain imports and a failure of the Bengali provincial Government to declare a famine, and fund relief, the imposition of grain and transport embargoes by the neighbouring provincial administrations, to prevent their own stocks being transferred to Bengal, the failure to implement India wide rationing by the central Delhi authority, hoarding and profiteering by merchants, medieval land management practices, an Axis powers denial program that confiscated boats once used to transport grain, a Delhi administration that prioritised supplying, and offering medical treatment to the British Indian Army, War workers, and Civil servants, over the populace at large, incompetence and ignorance, and an Imperial War Cabinet initially leaving the issue to the Colonial administration to resolve, than to the original local crop failures, and blights.

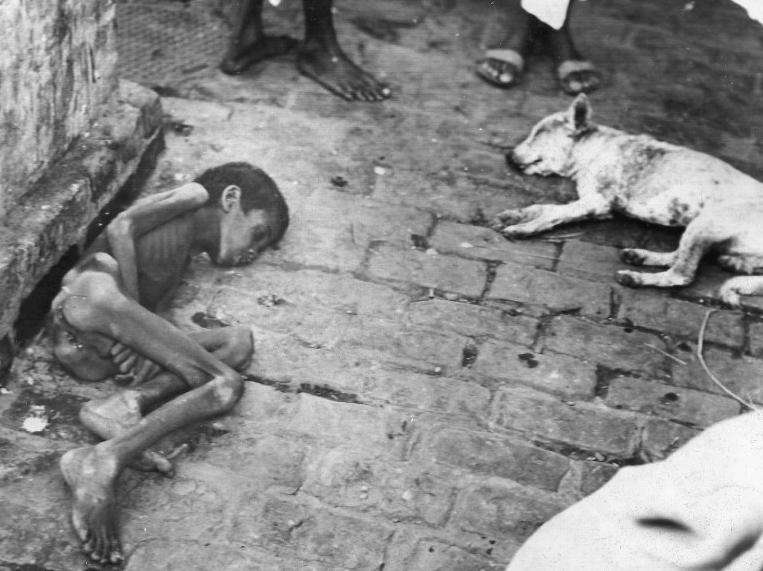
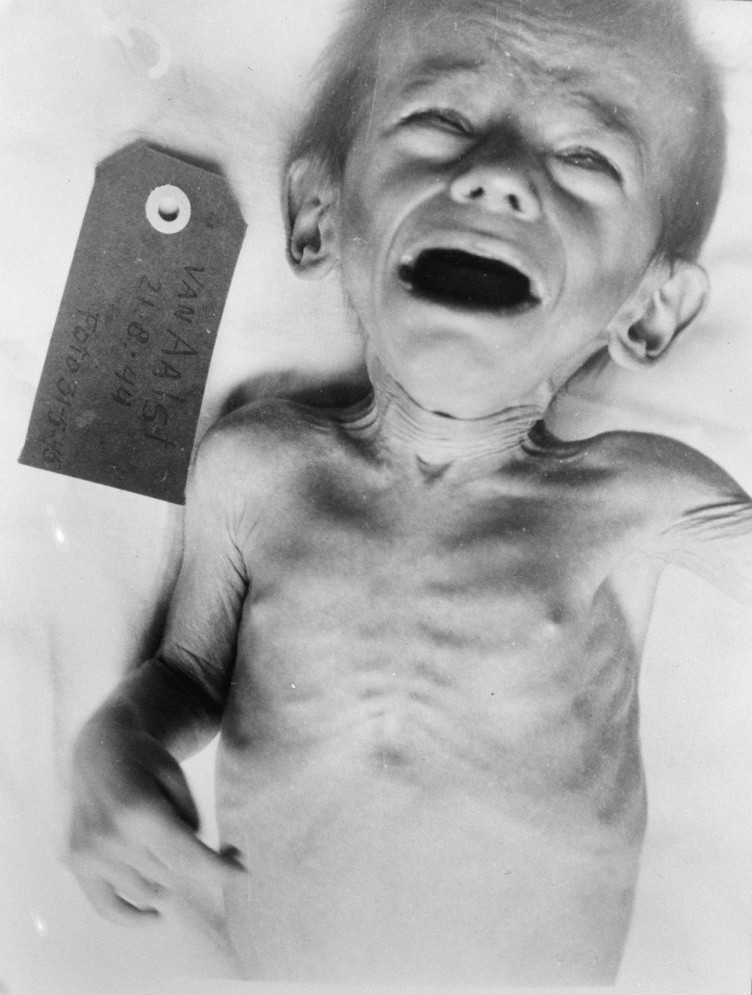
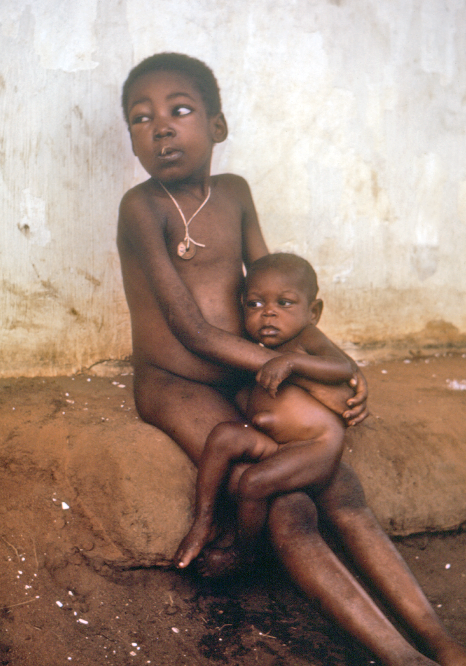
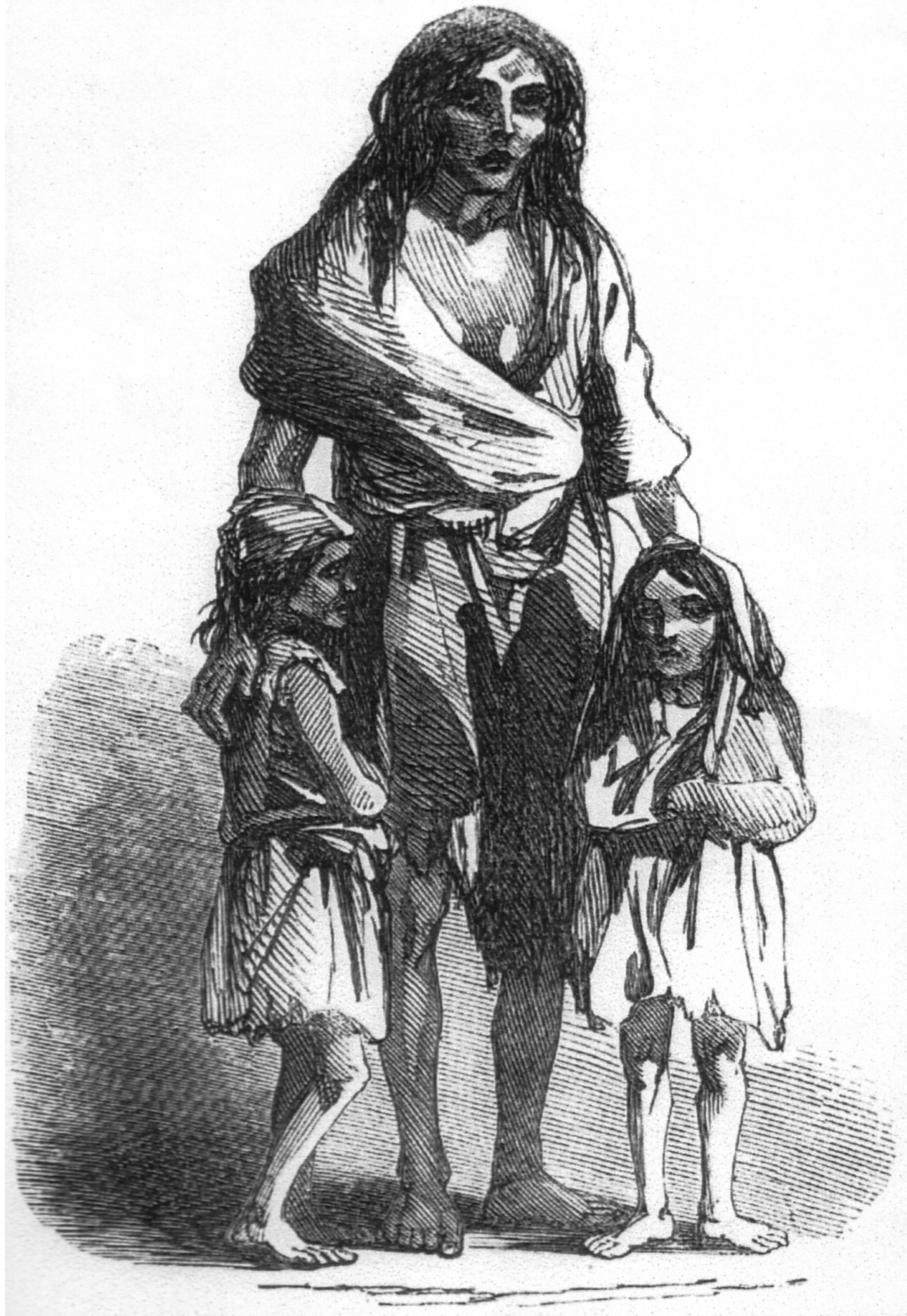
From top-left to bottom-right, or (mobile) from top-to-bottom: child victims of famines in India (1943–44), the Netherlands (1944–45), Nigeria (1967–70), and an engraving of a woman and her children during the Great Famine in Ireland (1845–1849)

A few of the great famines of the late 20th century were: the Biafran famine in the 1960s, the Khmer Rouge-caused famine in Cambodia in the 1970s, the North Korean famine of the 1990s, and the Ethiopian famine of 1983–1985. Approximately 3 million died as a consequence of the Second Congo War.

The Ethiopian famine was reported on television reports around the world, carrying footage of starving Ethiopians whose plight was centered around a feeding station near the town of Korem. This stimulated the first mass movements to end famine across the world.

BBC newsreader Michael Buerk gave moving commentary of the tragedy on 23 October 1984, which he described as a "biblical famine". This prompted the Band Aid single, which was organized by Bob Geldof and featured more than 20 pop stars. The Live Aid concerts in London and Philadelphia raised even more funds for the cause. Hundreds of thousands of people died within one year as a result of the famine, but the publicity Live Aid generated encouraged Western nations to make available enough surplus grain to end the immediate hunger crisis in Africa.

Some of the famines of the 20th century served the geopolitical purposes of governments, including traumatizing and replacing distrusted ethnic populations in strategically important regions, rendering regions vulnerable to invasion difficult to govern by an enemy power and shifting the burden of food shortage onto regions where the distress of the population posed a lesser risk of catastrophic regime de-legitimation.

=== 21st century ===
Until 2017, worldwide deaths from famine had been falling dramatically. The World Peace Foundation reported that from the 1870s to the 1970s, great famines killed an average of 928,000 people a year. Since 1980, annual deaths had dropped to an average of 75,000, less than 10% of what they had been until the 1970s. That reduction was achieved despite the approximately 150,000 lives lost in the 2011 Somalia famine. Yet in 2017, the UN officially declared famine had returned to Africa, with about 20 million people at risk of death from starvation in the northern part of Nigeria, in South Sudan, in Yemen, and in Somalia.

On 20 April 2021, hundreds of aid organizations from around the world wrote an open letter to The Guardian newspaper, warning that millions of people in Yemen, Afghanistan, Ethiopia, South Sudan, Burkina Faso, Democratic Republic of the Congo, Honduras, Venezuela, Nigeria, Haiti, Central African Republic, Uganda, Zimbabwe and Sudan faced starvation. Organizations including the International Council of Voluntary Agencies and the World Food Programme said: "Girls and boys, men and women, are being starved by conflict and violence; by inequality; by the impacts of climate change; by the loss of land, jobs of prospects; by a fight against Covid-19 that has left them even further behind". The groups warned that funding had dwindled, while money alone would not be enough by itself. Governments should step in to end conflicts and ensure humanitarian access, they said. "If no action is taken, lives will be lost. The responsibility to address this lies with states", they added.

In November 2021, the World Food Programme reported that 45 million people were "teetering on the very edge of famine" in 43 countries and that the slightest shock would push them over the precipice. This number had risen from 42 million earlier in 2021, and from 27 million in 2019. The slightest shock — be it extreme weather linked to climate change, conflict, or the deadly interplay of both hunger drivers — could push tens of millions of people into irreversible peril, a prospect the agency had been warning of for more than a year. Afghanistan was becoming the world's largest humanitarian crisis, with the country's needs surpassing those of the other worst-hit countries — Ethiopia, South Sudan, Syria and even Yemen.

In August 2024, famine was declared in Sudan, where several refugee camps, displaced by the ongoing Sudanese civil war, were found to be facing severe famine conditions. According to the IPC, over 226 million people experienced high levels of acute food insecurity, and a phase 5 famine was detected in multiple regions. UN experts have accused the Sudanese Armed Forces (SAF) and the Rapid Support Forces (RSF) of using 'starvation tactics' against the civilians in the country, and have said "Never in modern history have so many people faced starvation and famine as in Sudan today".

In August 2025, famine was declared in Gaza, More than half a million people in Gaza were trapped in famine, marked by widespread starvation, destitution and preventable deaths, according to a new Integrated Food Security Phase Classification (IPC) analysis that was released, Access to food in Gaza remains severely constrained. In July, the number of households reporting very severe hunger doubled across the territory compared to May and more than tripled in Gaza City. More than one in three people (39 percent) indicated they were going days at a time without eating, and adults regularly skip meals to feed their children.

Malnutrition among children in Gaza is accelerating at a catastrophic pace. In July alone, more than 12,000 children were identified as acutely malnourished – the highest monthly figure ever recorded and a six-fold increase since the start of the year. Nearly one in four of these children were suffering from severe acute malnutrition (SAM), the deadliest form with both short and long-term impacts.

According to the IPC Analysis in May, the number of children expected to be at severe risk of death from malnutrition by the end of June 2026 has tripled from 14,100 to 43,400. Similarly, for pregnant and breastfeeding women, the number of estimated cases has tripled from 17,000 in May to 55,000 women expected to be suffering from perilous levels of malnutrition by mid-2026. The impact is visible: one in every five babies is born prematurely or underweight.

The new assessment reports the most severe deterioration since the IPC began analyzing acute food insecurity and acute malnutrition in the Gaza Strip, and it marks the first time a famine has been officially confirmed in the Middle East region.

Meanwhile, approximately 98 percent of cropland in the territory is damaged or inaccessible – decimating the agriculture sector and local food production – and nine of ten people have been serially displaced from homes. Cash is critically scarce, aid operations remain severely disrupted, with most UN trucks looted amid growing desperation. Food prices are extremely high and there is not enough fuel and water to cook and medicines and medical supplies.

Gaza's health system has severely deteriorated, access to safe drinking water and sanitation services has been drastically reduced, while multi-drug resistant infections are surging and levels of morbidity – including diarrhea, fever, acute respiratory and skin infections – are alarmingly high among children.

== Regional history ==
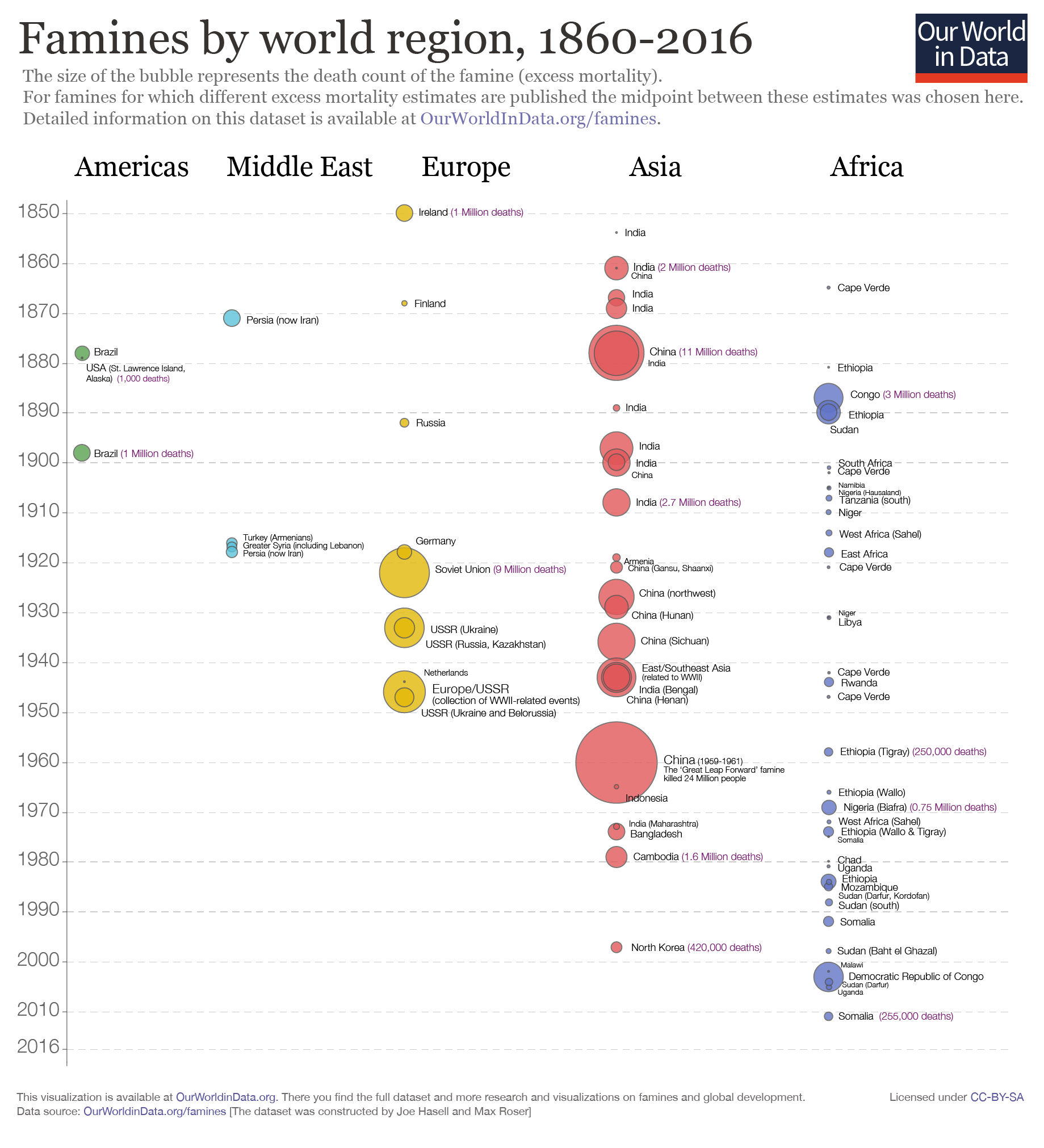
Famines by continent

=== Africa ===
==== Early history ====
In the mid-22nd century BC, a sudden and short-lived climatic change that caused reduced rainfall resulted in several decades of drought in Upper Egypt. The resulting famine and civil strife is believed to have been a major cause of the collapse of the Old Kingdom. An account from the First Intermediate Period states, "All of Upper Egypt was dying of hunger and people were eating their children." As for recorded examples about more recent centuries: in the 1680s, famine extended across the entire Sahel, and in 1738 half the population of Timbuktu died of famine. In Egypt, between 1687 and 1731, there were six famines. The famine that afflicted Egypt in 1784 cost it roughly one-sixth of its population. The Maghreb experienced famine and plague in the late 18th century and early 19th century. There was famine in Tripoli in 1784, and in Tunis in 1785.

According to John Iliffe, "Portuguese records of Angola from the 16th century show that a great famine occurred on average every seventy years; accompanied by epidemic disease, it might kill one-third or one-half of the population, destroying the demographic growth of a generation and forcing colonists back into the river valleys."

The first documentation of weather in West-Central Africa occurred around the mid-16th to 17th centuries in areas such as Luanda Kongo, however, not much data was recorded on the issues of weather and disease except for a few notable documents. The only records obtained are of violence between Portuguese and Africans during the Battle of Mbwila in 1665. In these documents the Portuguese wrote of African raids on Portuguese merchants solely for food, giving clear signs of famine. Additionally, instances of cannibalism by the African Jaga were also more prevalent during this time frame, indicating an extreme deprivation of a primary food source.

==== Colonial period ====
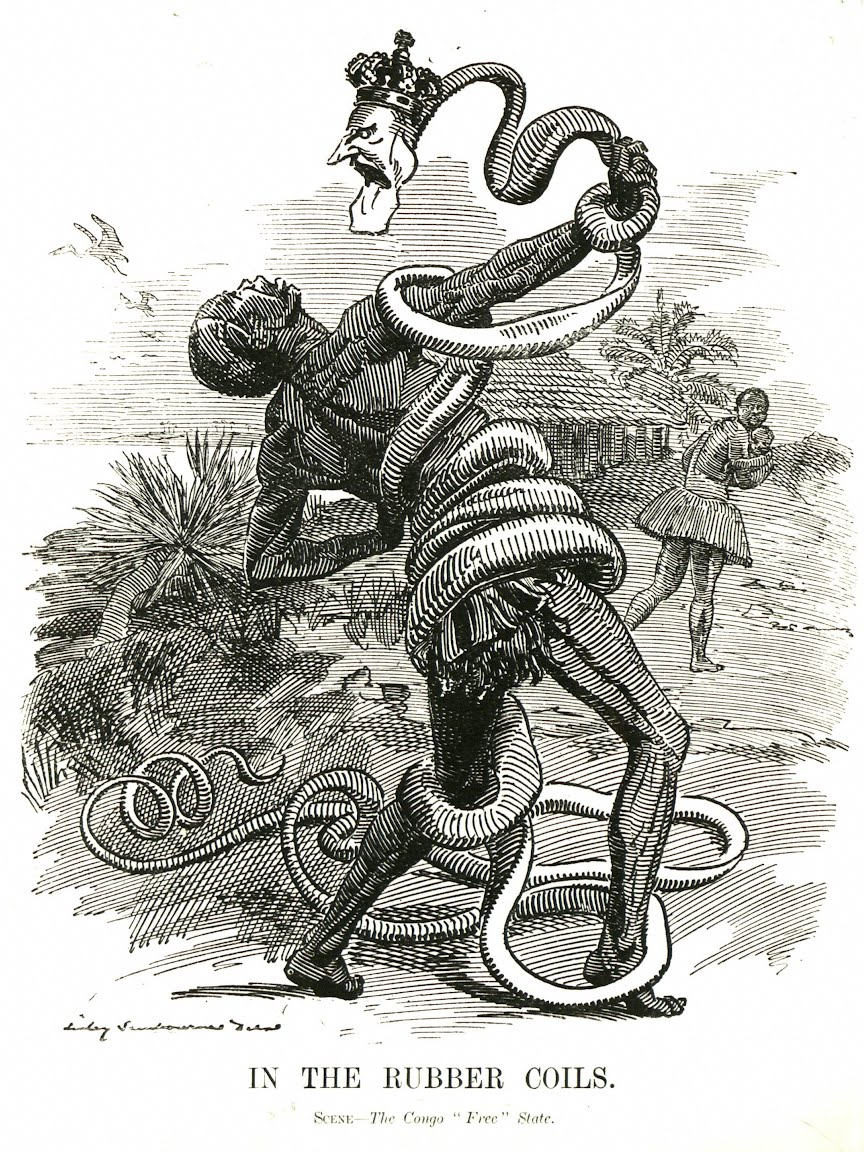
A 1906 Punch cartoon depicting King Leopold II as a snake entangling a Congolese man

A notable period of famine occurred around the turn of the 20th century in the Congo Free State. In forming this state, Leopold used mass labor camps to finance his empire. This period resulted in the death of up to 10 million Congolese from brutality, disease and famine. Some colonial "pacification" efforts often caused severe famine, notably with the repression of the Maji Maji revolt in Tanganyika in 1906. The introduction of cash crops such as cotton, and forcible measures to impel farmers to grow these crops, sometimes impoverished the peasantry in many areas, such as northern Nigeria, contributing to greater vulnerability to famine when severe drought struck in 1913.

A large-scale famine occurred in Ethiopia in 1888 and in succeeding years, as the rinderpest epizootic, introduced into Eritrea by infected cattle, spread southwards reaching ultimately as far as South Africa. In Ethiopia it was estimated that as much as 90 percent of the national herd died, rendering rich farmers and herders destitute overnight. This coincided with drought associated with an El Niño oscillation, human epidemics of smallpox, and in several countries, intense war. The Ethiopian Great famine that afflicted Ethiopia from 1888 to 1892 cost it roughly one-third of its population. In Sudan the year 1888 is remembered as the worst famine in history, on account of these factors and also the exactions imposed by the Mahdist state.

The oral traditions of the Himba people recall two droughts from 1910 to 1917. From 1910 to 1911 the Himba described the drought as "drought of the omutati seed", also called omangowi, the fruit of an unidentified vine that people ate during the time period. From 1914 to 1916, droughts brought katur' ombanda or kari' ombanda 'the time of eating clothing'.

==== 20th century ====
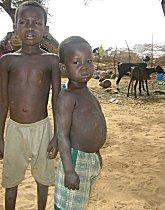
Malnourished children in Niger, during the 2005 famine

For the middle part of the 20th century, agriculturalists, economists and geographers did not consider Africa to be especially famine prone. From 1870 to 2010, 87% of deaths from famine occurred in Asia and Eastern Europe, with only 9.2% in Africa. There were notable counter-examples, such as the famine in Rwanda during World War II and the Malawi famine of 1949, but most famines were localized and brief food shortages. Although the drought was brief the main cause of death in Rwanda was due to Belgian prerogatives to acquisition grain from their colony (Rwanda). The increased grain acquisition was related to WW2. This and the drought caused 300,000 Rwandans to perish.

From 1967 to 1969 large scale famine occurred in Biafra and Nigeria due to a government blockade of the Breakaway territory. It is estimated that 1.5 million people died of starvation due to this famine. Additionally, drought and other government interference with the food supply caused 500 thousand Africans to perish in Central and West Africa.

Famine recurred in the early 1970s, when Ethiopia and the west African Sahel suffered drought and famine. The Ethiopian famine of that time was closely linked to the crisis of feudalism in that country, and in due course helped to bring about the downfall of the Emperor Haile Selassie. The Sahelian famine was associated with the slowly growing crisis of pastoralism in Africa, which has seen livestock herding decline as a viable way of life over the last two generations.

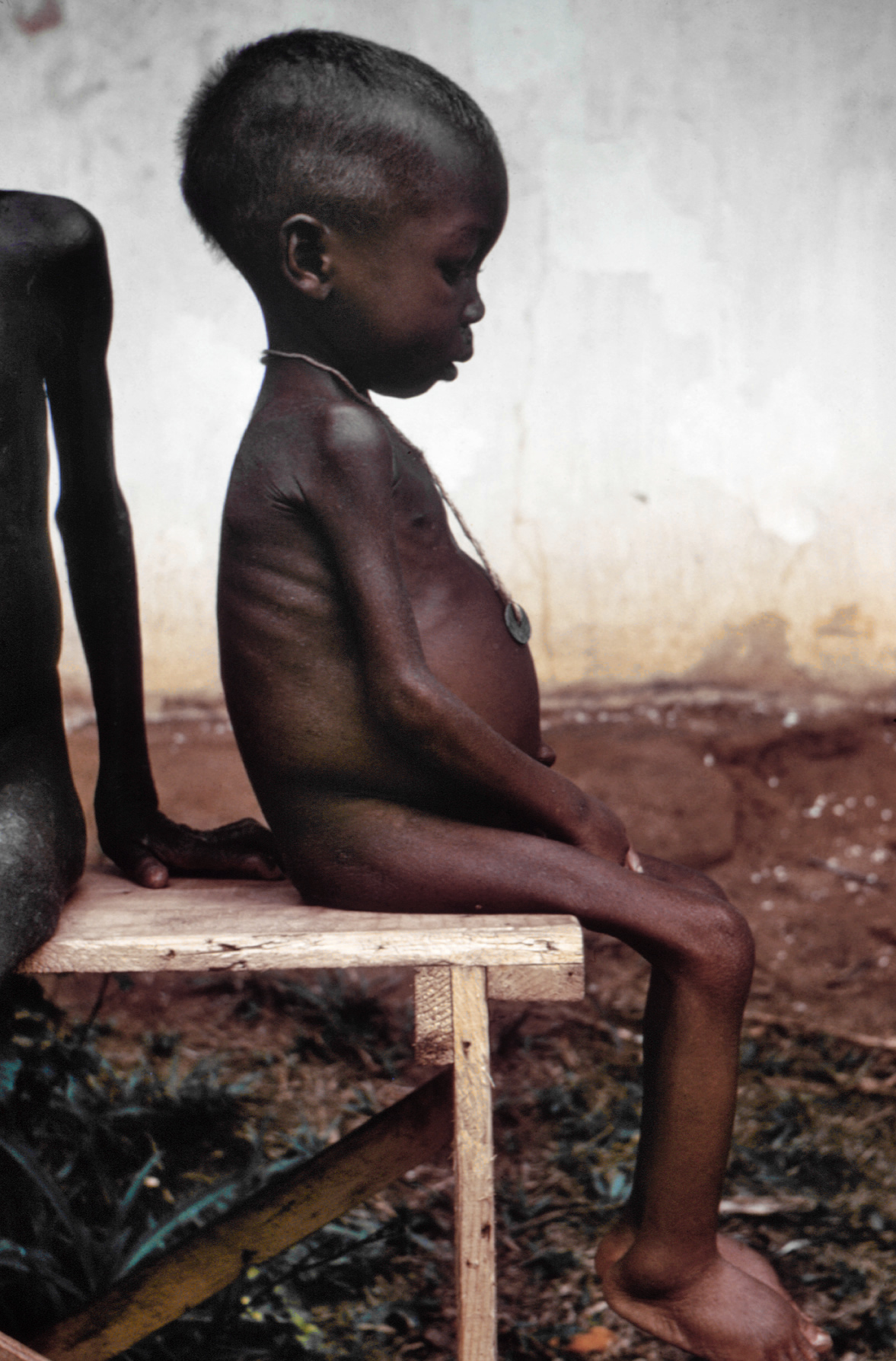
A girl during the Nigerian Civil War of the late 1960s. Pictures of the famine caused by the Nigerian blockade garnered sympathy for the Biafrans worldwide.

From 1977 the white minority government of Rhodesia restricted the supply of food in rural districts in an attempt to deny food to nationalist forces in what was designated Operation Turkey. This exasperated food shortages that had resulted from a policy forcing much of the rural population into protected villages, an anthrax outbreak, a drought and the breakdown in government services as a result of the Rhodesian Bush War. In late 1979 the International Red Cross estimated that between 13 and 29 percent of Rhodesians were malnourished.

Famines occurred in Sudan in the late-1970s and again in 1990 and 1998. The 1980 famine in Karamoja, Uganda was, in terms of mortality rates, one of the worst in history. 21% of the population died, including 60% of the infants. In the 1980s, large scale multilayer drought occurred in the Sudan and Sahelian regions of Africa. This caused famine because even though the Sudanese Government believed there was a surplus of grain, there were local deficits across the region.

In October 1984, television reports describing the Ethiopian famine as "biblical", prompted the Live Aid concerts in London and Philadelphia, which raised large sums to alleviate the suffering. A primary cause of the famine (one of the largest seen in the country) is that Ethiopia (and the surrounding Horn) was still recovering from the droughts which occurred in the mid-late 1970s. Compounding this problem was the intermittent fighting due to Ethiopian Civil War, the government's lack of organization in providing relief, and hoarding of supplies to control the population. Ultimately, over 1 million Ethiopians died and over 22 million people suffered due to the prolonged drought, which lasted roughly 2 years.

In 1992 Somalia became a war zone with no effective government, police, or basic services after the collapse of the dictatorship led by Siad Barre and the split of power between warlords. This coincided with a massive drought, causing over 300,000 Somalis to perish.

==== Recent years ====
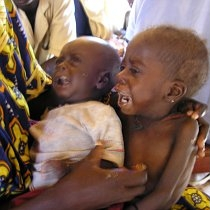
Laure Souley holds her three-year-old daughter and an infant son at a MSF aide center during the 2005 famine, Maradi Niger

Since the start of the 21st century, more effective early warning and humanitarian response actions have reduced the number of deaths by famine markedly. That said, many African countries are not self-sufficient in food production, relying on income from cash crops to import food. Agriculture in Africa is susceptible to climatic fluctuations, especially droughts which can reduce the amount of food produced locally. Other agricultural problems include soil infertility, land degradation and erosion, swarms of desert locusts, which can destroy whole crops, and livestock diseases. Desertification is increasingly problematic: the Sahara reportedly spreads up to 48 kilometres (30 mi) per year. The most serious famines have been caused by a combination of drought, misguided economic policies, and conflict. The 1983–85 famine in Ethiopia, for example, was the outcome of all these three factors, made worse by the Communist government's censorship of the emerging crisis. In Capitalist Sudan at the same date, drought and economic crisis combined with denials of any food shortage by the then-government of President Gaafar Nimeiry, to create a crisis that killed perhaps 250,000 people—and helped bring about a popular uprising that overthrew Nimeiry.

Numerous factors make the food security situation in Africa tenuous, including political instability, armed conflict and civil war, corruption and mismanagement in handling food supplies, and trade policies that harm African agriculture. An example of a famine created by human rights abuses is the 1998 Sudan famine. AIDS is also having long-term economic effects on agriculture by reducing the available workforce, and is creating new vulnerabilities to famine by overburdening poor households. On the other hand, in the modern history of Africa on quite a few occasions famines acted as a major source of acute political instability. In Africa, if current trends of population growth and soil degradation continue, the continent might be able to feed just 25% of its population by 2025, according to United Nations University (UNU)'s Ghana-based Institute for Natural Resources in Africa.

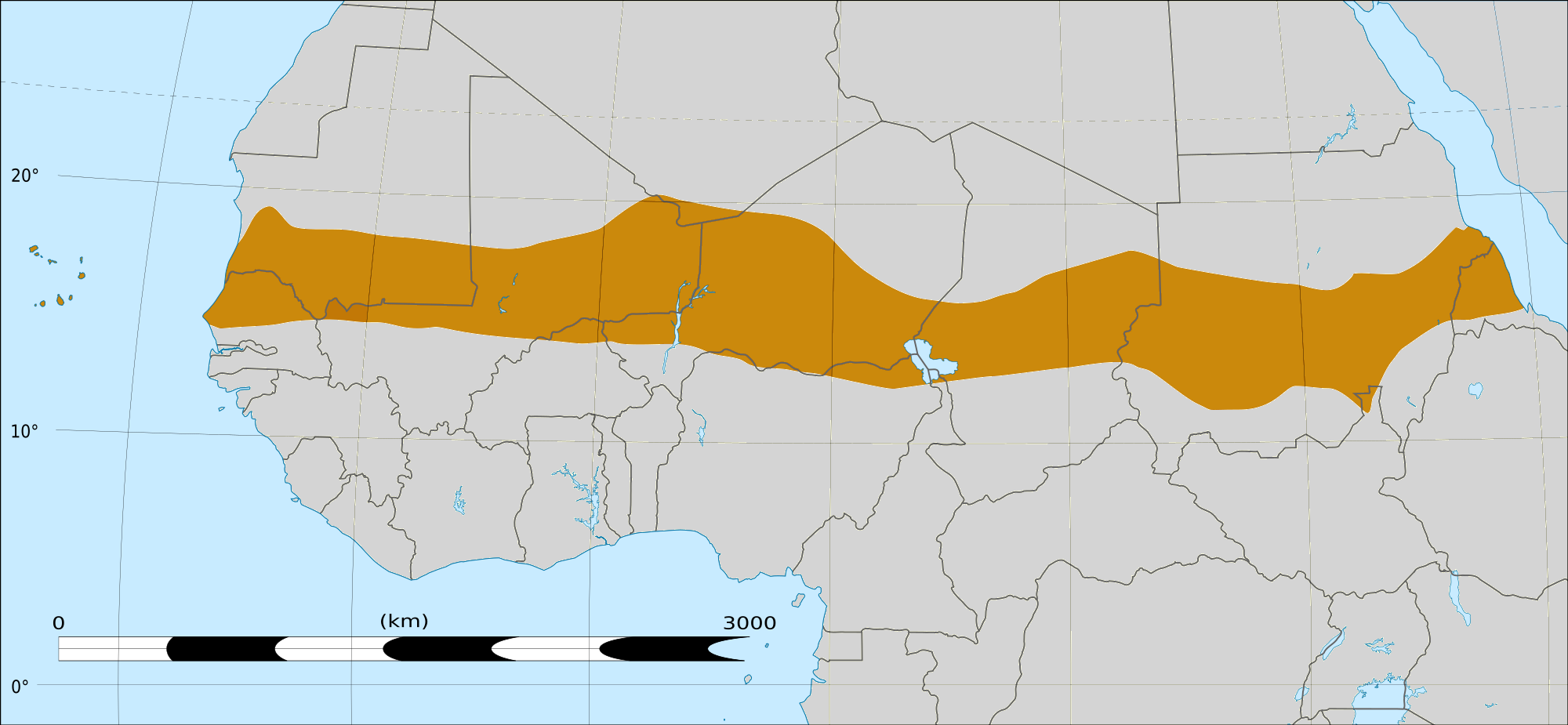
Famine-affected areas in the western Sahel belt during the 2012 drought.

Famines in the early 21st century in Africa include the 2005–06 Niger food crisis, the 2010 Sahel famine and the 2011 East Africa drought, where two consecutive missed rainy seasons precipitated one of the worst droughts in East Africa in 60 years. An estimated 50,000 to 150,000 people are reported to have died during the period. In 2012, the Sahel drought put more than 10 million people in the western Sahel at risk of famine (according to a Methodist Relief & Development Fund (MRDF) aid expert), due to a month-long heat wave.

Today, famine is most widespread in Sub-Saharan Africa, but with exhaustion of food resources, overdrafting of groundwater, wars, internal struggles, and economic failure, famine continues to be a worldwide problem with hundreds of millions of people suffering. These famines cause widespread malnutrition and impoverishment. The famine in Ethiopia in the 1980s had an immense death toll, although Asian famines of the 20th century have also produced extensive death tolls. Modern African famines are characterized by widespread destitution and malnutrition, with heightened mortality confined to young children.

==== Current initiatives ====
Against a backdrop of conventional interventions through the state or markets, alternative initiatives have been pioneered to address the problem of food security. One pan-African example is the Great Green Wall. Another example is the "Community Area-Based Development Approach" to agricultural development ("CABDA"), an NGO programme with the objective of providing an alternative approach to increasing food security in Africa. CABDA proceeds through specific areas of intervention such as the introduction of drought-resistant crops and new methods of food production such as agro-forestry. Piloted in Ethiopia in the 1990s it has spread to Malawi, Uganda, Eritrea and Kenya. In an analysis of the programme by the Overseas Development Institute, CABDA's focus on individual and community capacity-building is highlighted. This enables farmers to influence and drive their own development through community-run institutions, bringing food security to their household and region.

==== The role of African Unity organization ====
The organization of African unity and its role in the African crisis has been interested in the political aspects of the continent, especially the liberation of the occupied parts of it and the elimination of racism. The organization has succeeded in this area, but has not achieved success in the economic field or in development. African leaders have agreed to waive the role of their organization in the development to the United Nations through the Economic Commission for Africa "ECA".

=== Far East ===
==== China ====
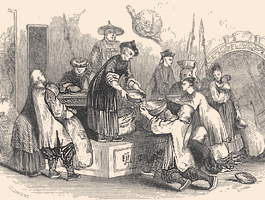
Chinese officials engaged in famine relief, 19th-century engraving

Chinese scholars had kept count of 1,828 instances of famine from 108 BCE to 1911 in one province or another—an average of more than one famine per year. A major famine from 1333 to 1337 killed 6 million. The four famines of 1810, 1811, 1846, and 1849 are said to have killed no fewer than 45 million people.

China's Qing dynasty bureaucracy devoted extensive attention to minimizing famines with a network of granaries. Its famines generally occurred immediately after El Niño-Southern Oscillation-linked droughts and floods. These events are comparable, though somewhat smaller in scale, to the ecological trigger events of China's vast 19th-century famines. Qing China carried out its relief efforts, which included vast shipments of food, a requirement that the rich open their storehouses to the poor, and price regulation, as part of a state guarantee of subsistence to the peasantry (known as ming-sheng). However the Taiping Rebellion of the 1850s disrupted the granary relief system such that 1850 to 1873 saw the population of China drop by over 30 million people from early deaths and missing births.

When a stressed monarchy shifted from state management and direct shipments of grain to monetary charity in the mid-19th century, the system broke down. Thus the 1867–68 famine under the Tongzhi Restoration was successfully relieved but the Great North China Famine of 1877–78, caused by drought across northern China, was a catastrophe. The province of Shanxi was substantially depopulated as grains ran out, and desperately starving people stripped forests, fields, and their very houses for food. Estimated mortality is 9.5 to 13 million people.

===== Great Leap Forward 1958–1961 =====
The largest famine of the 20th century was the 1958–1961 famine associated with the Great Leap Forward in China. The immediate causes of this famine lay in Mao Zedong's ill-fated attempt to transform China from an agricultural nation to an industrial power in one huge leap. Communist Party cadres across China insisted that peasants abandon their farms for collective farms, and begin to produce steel in small foundries, often melting down their farm instruments in the process. Collectivisation undermined incentives for the investment of labor and resources in agriculture; unrealistic plans for decentralized metal production sapped needed labor; unfavorable weather conditions; and communal dining halls encouraged overconsumption of available food. Such was the centralized control of information and the intense pressure on party cadres to report only good news—such as production quotas met or exceeded—that information about the escalating disaster was effectively suppressed. When the leadership did become aware of the scale of the famine, it did little to respond, and continued to ban any discussion of the cataclysm. This blanket suppression of news was so effective that very few Chinese citizens were aware of the scale of the famine, and the greatest peacetime demographic disaster of the 20th century only became widely known twenty years later, when the veil of censorship began to lift.

The exact number of famine deaths during 1958–1961 is difficult to determine, and estimates range from 18 million to at least 42 million people, with a further 30 million cancelled or delayed births. It was only when the famine had wrought its worst that Mao reversed agricultural collectivisation policies, which were effectively dismantled in 1978. China has not experienced a famine of the proportions of the Great Leap Forward since 1961.

==== Japan ====
Japan experienced more than 130 famines between 1603 and 1868.

==== Cambodia ====
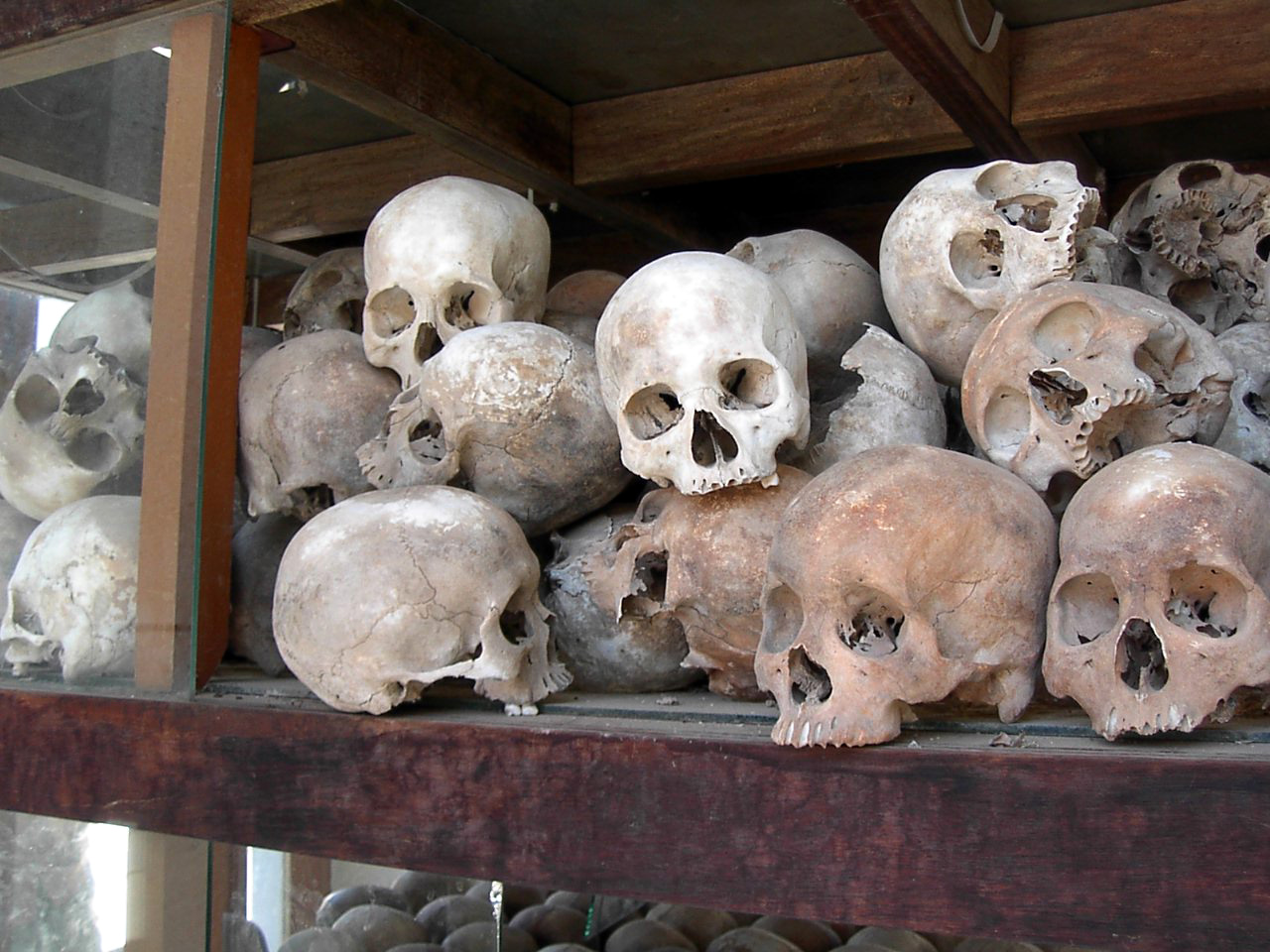
Skulls of Khmer Rouge murder victims at Choeung Ek

In 1975, the Khmer Rouge took control of Cambodia. The new government was led by Pol Pot, who desired to turn Cambodia into a communist, agrarian utopia. His regime emptied the cities, abolished currency and private property, and forced Cambodia's population into slavery on communal farms. In less than four years, the Khmer Rouge had executed nearly 1.4 million people, mostly those believed to be a threat to the new ideology.

Due to the failure of the Khmer Rouge's agrarian reform policies, Cambodia experienced widespread famine. As many as one million more died from starvation, disease, and exhaustion resulting from these policies. In 1979 Vietnam invaded Cambodia and removed the Khmer Rouge from power. By that time about one quarter of Cambodia's population had been killed.

==== North Korean famine in the 1990s ====
Famine struck North Korea in the mid-1990s, set off by unprecedented floods. This autarkic urban, industrial state depended on massive inputs of subsidised goods, including fossil fuels, primarily from the Soviet Union and the People's Republic of China. When the Soviet collapse and China's marketization switched trade to a hard currency, full-price basis, North Korea's economy collapsed. The vulnerable agricultural sector experienced a massive failure in 1995–96, expanding to full-fledged famine by 1996–1999.

Estimates based on the North Korean census suggest that 240,000 to 420,000 people died as a result of the famine and that there were 600,000 to 850,000 unnatural deaths in North Korea from 1993 to 2008. North Korea has not yet regained food self-sufficiency and relies on external food aid from China, Japan, South Korea, Russia and the United States. While Woo-Cumings have focused on the FAD side of the famine, Moon argues that FAD shifted the incentive structure of the authoritarian regime to react in a way that forced millions of disenfranchised people to starve to death.

According to the UN's Food and Agriculture Organization (FAO), North Korea is facing a serious cereal shortfall in 2017 after the country's crop harvest was diminished as a result of severe drought. The FAO estimated that early-season production fell by over 30 percent compared to agricultural output from the previous year, leading to the country's worst famine since 2001.

==== Vietnam ====
The Japanese occupation during World War II accelerated preexisting food scarcity caused by the Great Depression and the growing French hoarding of farmland. The Vietnamese famine of 1944–1945 death toll is between 700,000 and 2,000,000.

=== India ===
Owing to its almost entire dependence upon the monsoon rains, India is vulnerable to crop failures, which upon occasion deepen into famine. There were 14 famines in India between the 11th and 17th centuries (Bhatia, 1985). For example, during the 1022–1033 Great famines in India entire provinces were depopulated. Famine in Deccan killed at least two million people in 1702–1704. B.M. Bhatia believes that the earlier famines were localised, and it was only after 1860, during the British rule, that famine came to signify general shortage of foodgrains in the country. There were approximately 25 major famines spread through states such as Tamil Nadu in the south, and Bihar and Bengal in the east during the latter half of the 19th century.

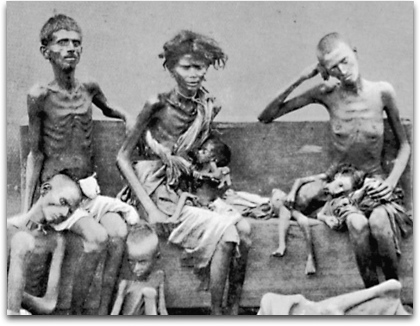
Victims of the Great Famine of 1876–78 in India during British rule, pictured in 1877.

Romesh Chunder Dutt argued as early as 1900, and present-day scholars such as Amartya Sen agree, that some historic famines were a product of both uneven rainfall and British economic and administrative policies, which since 1857 had led to the seizure and conversion of local farmland to foreign-owned plantations, restrictions on internal trade, heavy taxation of Indian citizens to support British expeditions in Afghanistan (see The Second Anglo-Afghan War), inflationary measures that increased the price of food, and substantial exports of staple crops from India to Britain. (Dutt, 1900 and 1902; Srivastava, 1968; Sen, 1982; Bhatia, 1985.)

Some British citizens, such as William Digby, agitated for policy reforms and famine relief, but Lord Lytton, the governing British viceroy in India, opposed such changes in the belief that they would stimulate shirking by Indian workers. The first, the Bengal famine of 1770, is estimated to have taken around 10 million lives—one-third of Bengal's population at the time. Other notable famines include the Great Famine of 1876–1878, in which 6.1 million to 10.3 million people died and the Indian famine of 1899–1900, in which 1.25 to 10 million people died. The famines were ended by the 20th century with the exception of the Bengal famine of 1943 killing an estimated 2.1 million Bengalis during World War II.

The observations of the Famine Commission of 1880 support the notion that food distribution is more to blame for famines than food scarcity. They observed that each province in British India, including Burma, had a surplus of foodgrains, and the annual surplus was 5.16 million tons (Bhatia, 1970). At that time, annual export of rice and other grains from India was approximately one million tons.

Population growth worsened the plight of the peasantry. As a result of peace and improved sanitation and health, the Indian population rose from perhaps 100 million in 1700 to 300 million by 1920. While encouraging agricultural productivity, the British also provided economic incentives to have more children to help in the fields. Although a similar population increase occurred in Europe at the same time, the growing numbers could be absorbed by industrialization or emigration to the Americas and Australia. India enjoyed neither an industrial revolution nor an increase in food growing. Moreover, Indian landlords had a stake in the cash crop system and discouraged innovation. As a result, population numbers far outstripped the amount of available food and land, creating dire poverty and widespread hunger.

— Craig A. Lockard, Societies, Networks, and Transitions

The Maharashtra drought saw zero deaths from starvation and is known for the successful employment of famine prevention policies, unlike during British rule.

=== Middle East ===
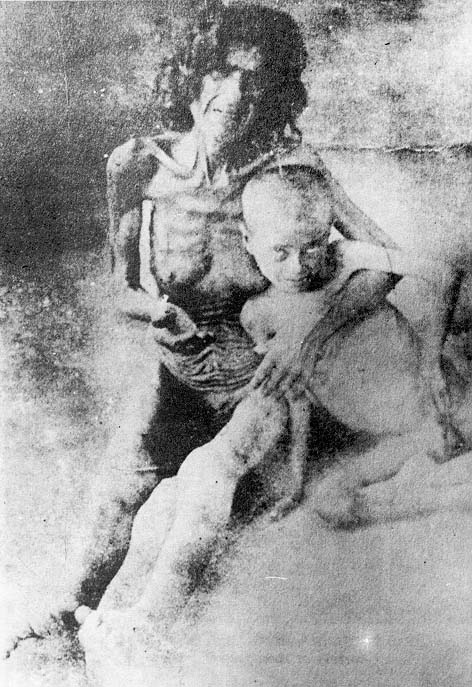
A starving woman and child during the Great Famine of Mount Lebanon. Ottoman Empire, 1915-1918

The Persian famine of 1870–1872 is believed to have caused the death of 1.5 million persons (20–25% of the population) in Persia (present-day Iran).

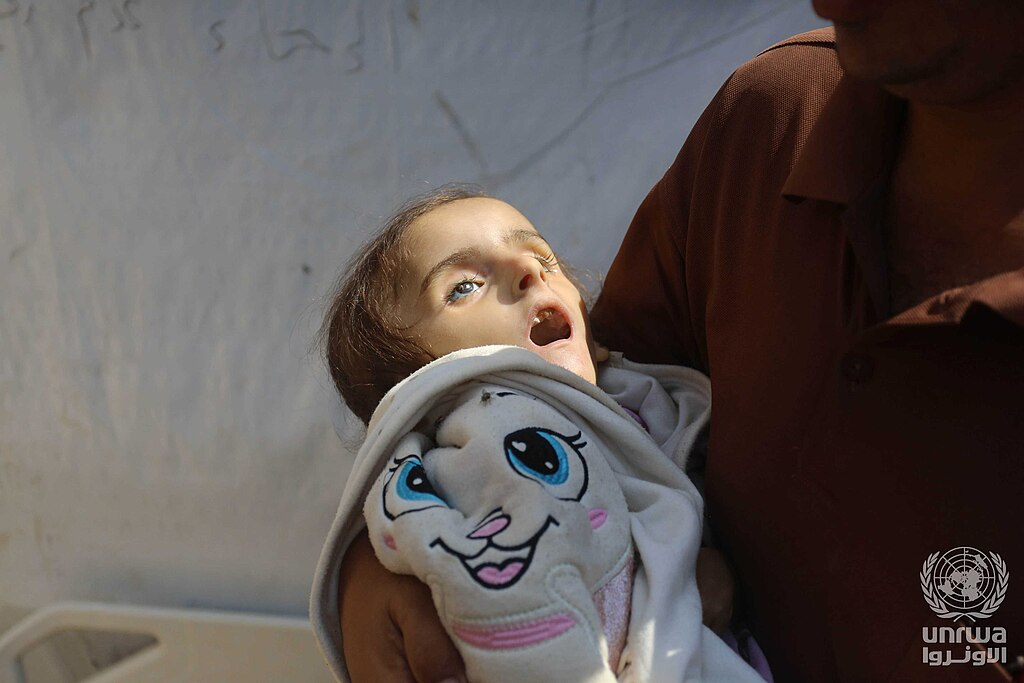
Dead four year old Palestinian girl, 14 August 2024

In the early 20th century an Ottoman blockade of food being exported to Lebanon caused a famine which killed up to 450,000 Lebanese (about one-third of the population). The famine killed more people than the Lebanese Civil War. The blockade was caused by uprisings in the Syrian region of the Empire, including one which occurred in the 1860s which led to the massacre of thousands of Lebanese and Syrian by Ottoman Turks and local Druze.

In 2025 Gaza has faced famine as a result of Israeli airstrikes during the Gaza war and an Israeli blockade, including of basic essentials and humanitarian aid. Airstrikes have destroyed food infrastructure, such as bakeries, mills, and food stores, and there is a widespread scarcity of essential supplies due to the blockade of aid. According to a group of UN experts, as of July 2024 Israel's "targeted starvation campaign" had spread throughout the entire Gaza Strip, causing the death of children. Israel's mission to the UN criticized the statement, calling it "misinformation". The same month, detected cases of childhood malnutrition in northern Gaza increased by 300 percent compared to May 2024. The UN-backed IPC confirmed famine is taking place in Gaza on 22 August 2025.

Volker Türk, the UN high commissioner for human rights, stated that Israel's restrictions on the entry of aid may constitute starvation as a weapon of war, which would be a war crime. An Independent International Commission of Inquiry also found Israel was using starvation as a method of war. In April and May, USAID and the US State Department's Bureau of Population, Refugees and Migration determined that Israel was blocking food aid from entering Gaza. These findings were rejected by Secretary of State Blinken and the Biden Administration. The Israeli government has denied it is using starvation as a weapon of war and said that arguments that its actions regarding the famine violate the Genocide Convention are "wholly unfounded". COGAT, the Israeli agency responsible for allowing aid into Gaza, has stated Israel was not putting limits into the amount of aid entering Gaza. COGAT's claim has been challenged by multiple entities, including the European Union, United Nations, Oxfam, and United Kingdom. Since March 2025, Israel has made the blockade publicly official, with Defense Minister declaring that "No humanitarian aid will enter Gaza". Israel has claimed that "Hamas stockpiled supplies and kept them from increasingly desperate civilians," but, as of February 2024, the US has not received evidence supporting this claim. There have been reports of armed gangs stealing aid.

=== Europe ===
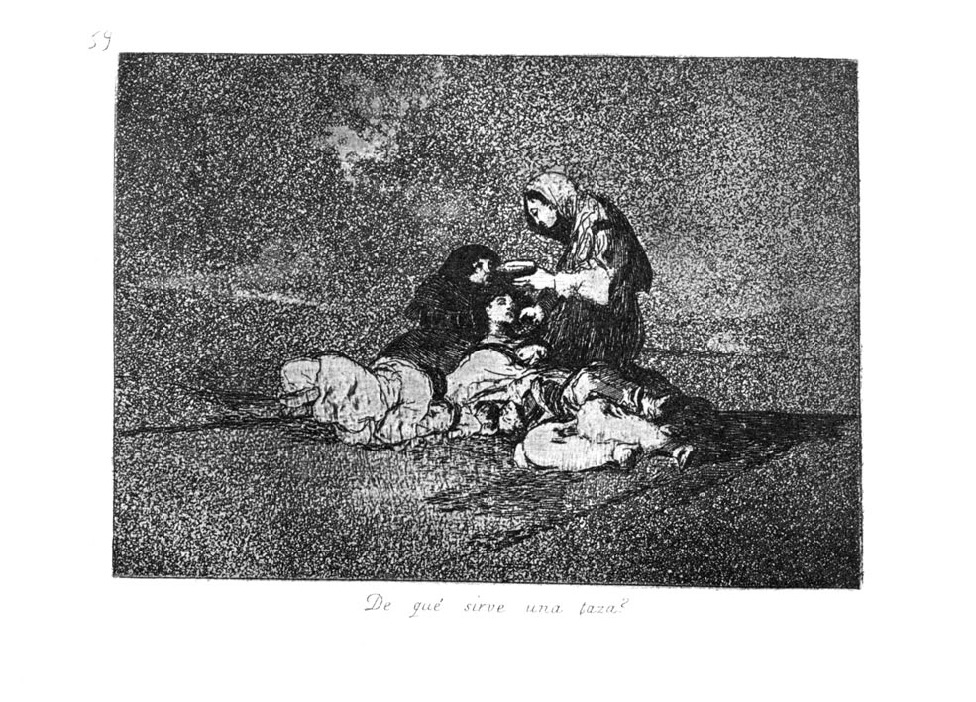
An engraving from Goya's Disasters of War, showing starving women, doubtless inspired by the terrible famine that struck Madrid in 1811–1812.

==== Middle Ages ====
The Great Famine of 1315–1317 (or to 1322) was the first major food crisis to strike Europe in the 14th century. Millions in northern Europe died over an extended number of years, marking a clear end to the earlier period of growth and prosperity during the 11th and 12th centuries. An unusually cold and wet spring of 1315 led to widespread crop failures, which lasted until at least the summer of 1317; some regions in Europe did not fully recover until 1322. Most nobles, cities, and states were slow to respond to the crisis and when they realized its severity, they had little success in securing food for their people. In 1315, in Norfolk, England, the price of grain soared from 5 shillings/quarter to 20 shillings/quarter. It was a period marked by extreme levels of criminal activity, disease and mass death, infanticide, and cannibalism. It had consequences for Church, State, European society and future calamities to follow in the 14th century. There were 95 famines in medieval Britain, and 75 or more in medieval France. More than 10% of England's population, or at least 500,000 people, may have died during the famine of 1315–1316.

Famine was a very destabilizing and devastating occurrence. The prospect of starvation led people to take desperate measures. When scarcity of food became apparent to peasants, they would sacrifice long-term prosperity for short-term survival. They would kill their draught animals, leading to lowered production in subsequent years. They would eat their seed corn, sacrificing next year's crop in the hope that more seed could be found. Once those means had been exhausted, they would take to the road in search of food. They migrated to the cities where merchants from other areas would be more likely to sell their food, as cities had a stronger purchasing power than did rural areas. Cities also administered relief programs and bought grain for their populations so that they could keep order. With the confusion and desperation of the migrants, crime would often follow them. Many peasants resorted to banditry in order to acquire enough to eat.

One famine would often lead to difficulties in the following years because of lack of seed stock or disruption of routine, or perhaps because of less-available labour. Famines were often interpreted as signs of God's displeasure. They were seen as the removal, by God, of His gifts to the people of the Earth. Elaborate religious processions and rituals were made to prevent God's wrath in the form of famine.

==== 16th century ====
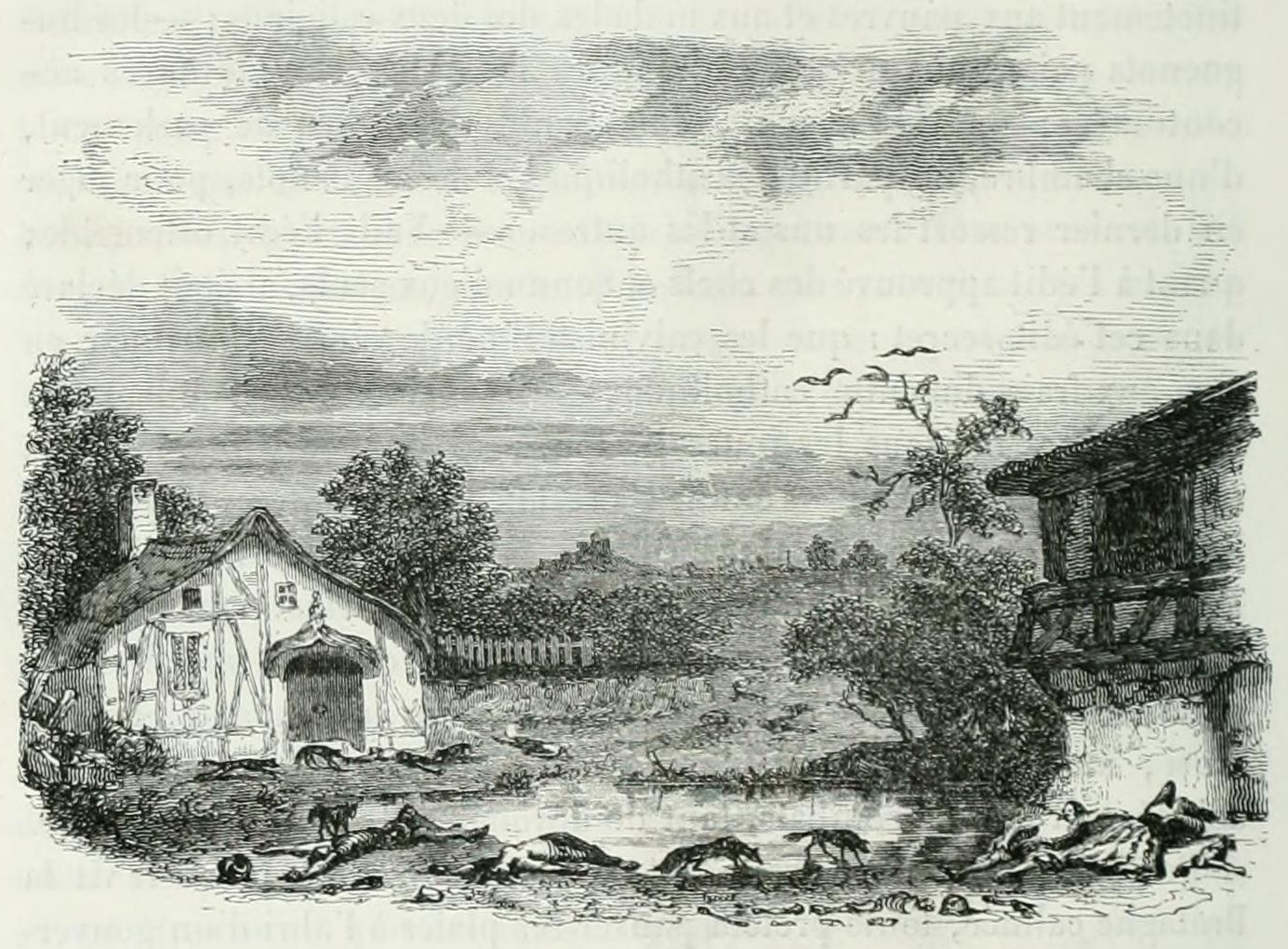
The 1590s saw a devastating famine in France exacerbated by the French Wars of Religion.

During the 15th century to the 18th century, famines in Europe became more frequent due to the Little Ice Age. The colder climate resulted in harvest failures and shortfalls that led to a rise in conspiracy theories concerning the causes behind these famines, such as the Pacte de Famine in France.

The 1590s saw the worst famines in centuries across all of Europe. Famine had been relatively rare during the 16th century. The economy and population had grown steadily as subsistence populations tend to when there is an extended period of relative peace (most of the time). Although peasants in areas of high population density, such as northern Italy, had learned to increase the yields of their lands through techniques such as promiscuous culture, they were still quite vulnerable to famines, forcing them to work their land even more intensively.

The great famine of the 1590s began a period of famine and decline in the 17th century. The price of grain, all over Europe was high, as was the population. Various types of people were vulnerable to the succession of bad harvests that occurred throughout the 1590s in different regions. The increasing number of wage labourers in the countryside were vulnerable because they had no food of their own, and their meager living was not enough to purchase the expensive grain of a bad-crop year. Town labourers were also at risk because their wages would be insufficient to cover the cost of grain, and, to make matters worse, they often received less money in bad-crop years since the disposable income of the wealthy was spent on grain. Often, unemployment would be the result of the increase in grain prices, leading to ever-increasing numbers of urban poor.

All areas of Europe were badly affected by the famine in these periods, especially rural areas. The Netherlands was able to escape most of the damaging effects of the famine, though the 1590s were still difficult years there. Amsterdam's grain trade with the Baltic guaranteed a food supply.

==== 17th century ====
The years around 1620 saw another period of famine sweep across Europe. These famines were generally less severe than the famines of twenty-five years earlier, but they were nonetheless quite serious in many areas. Perhaps the worst famine since 1600, the great famine in Finland in 1696, killed one-third of the population.

Devastating harvest failures afflicted the northern Italian economy from 1618 to 1621, and it did not recover fully for centuries. There were serious famines in the late-1640s and less severe ones in the 1670s throughout northern Italy.

Over two million people died in two famines in France between 1693 and 1710. Both famines were made worse by ongoing wars.

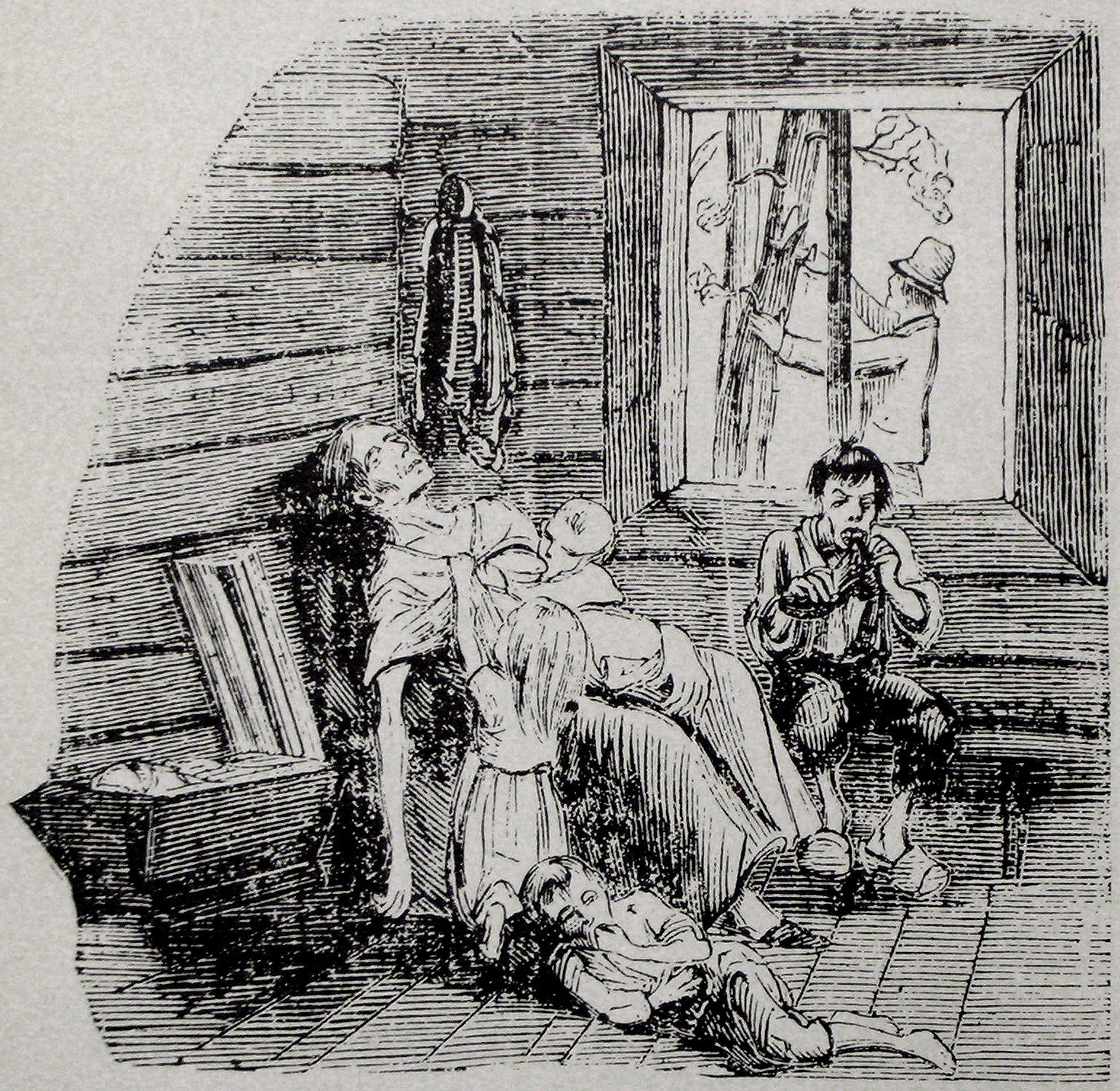
Illustration of starvation in northern Sweden, Swedish famine of 1867–1869

As late as the 1690s, Scotland experienced famine which reduced the population of parts of Scotland by at least 15%.

The Great Famine of 1695–1697 may have killed a third of the Finnish population. and roughly 10% of Norway's population. Death rates rose in Scandinavia between 1740 and 1800 as the result of a series of crop failures. For instance, the Finnish famine of 1866–1868 killed 15% of the population.

==== 18th century ====
The period of 1740–1743 saw frigid winters and summer droughts, which led to famine across Europe and a major spike in mortality. The winter 1740–41 was unusually cold, possibly because of volcanic activity.

According to Scott and Duncan (2002), "Eastern Europe experienced more than 150 recorded famines between AD 1500 and 1700 and there were 100 hunger years and 121 famine years in Russia between AD 971 and 1974."

The Great Famine, which lasted from 1770 until 1771, killed about one tenth of Czech lands' population, or 250,000 inhabitants, and radicalised countrysides leading to peasant uprisings.

There were sixteen good harvests and 111 famine years in northern Italy from 1451 to 1767. According to Stephen L. Dyson and Robert J. Rowland, "The Jesuits of Cagliari [in Sardinia] recorded years during the late 1500s 'of such hunger and so sterile that the majority of the people could sustain life only with wild ferns and other weeds' ... During the terrible famine of 1680, some 80,000 persons, out of a total population of 250,000, are said to have died, and entire villages were devastated".

According to Bryson (1974), there were thirty-seven famine years in Iceland between 1500 and 1804. In 1783 the volcano Laki in south-central Iceland erupted. The lava caused little direct damage, but ash and sulphur dioxide spewed out over most of the country, causing three-quarters of the island's livestock to perish. In the following famine, around ten thousand people died, one-fifth of the population of Iceland. [Asimov, 1984, 152–53]

==== 19th century ====
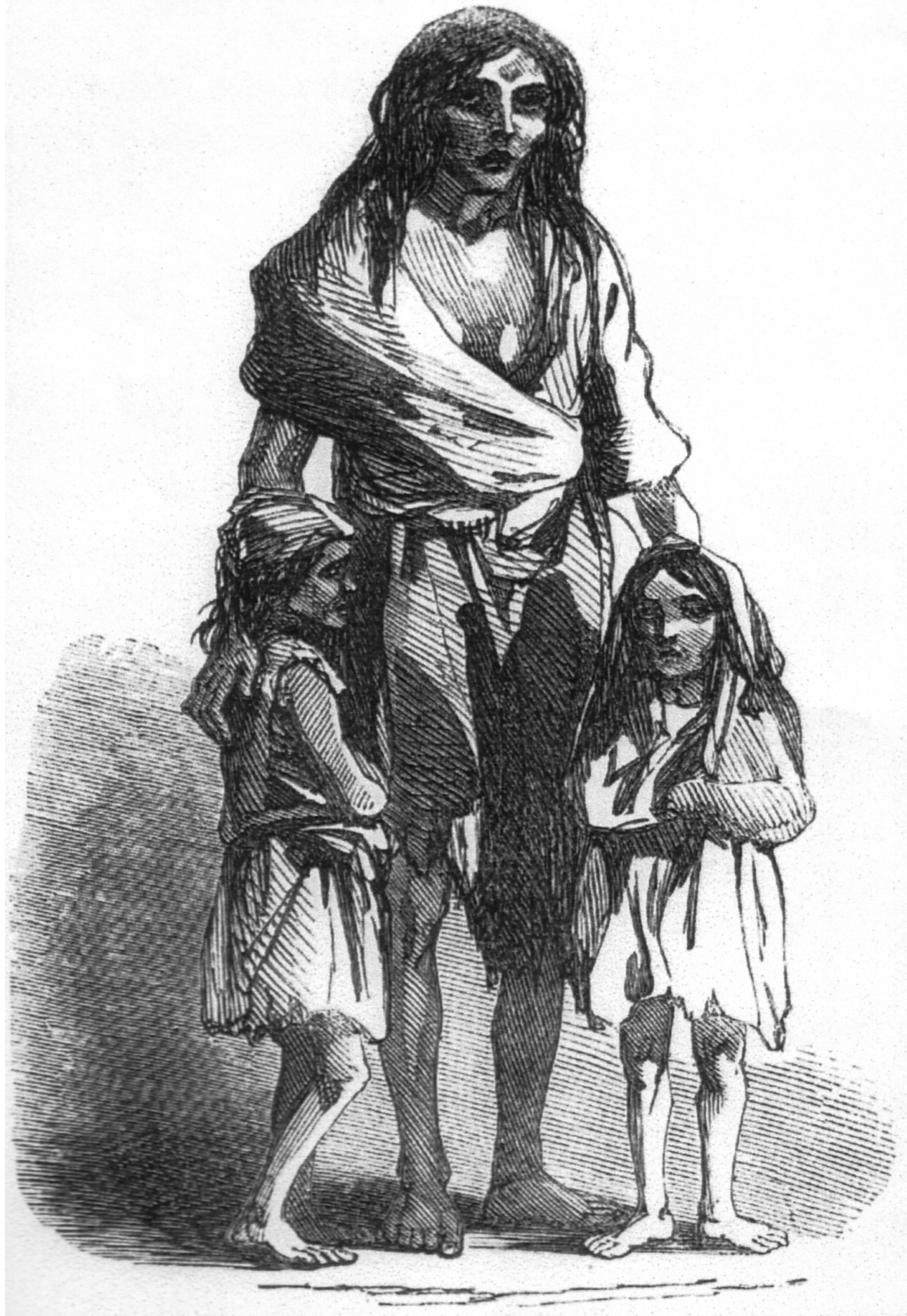
Depiction of victims of the Great Famine in Ireland, 1845–1849

Other areas of Europe have known famines much more recently. France saw famines as recently as the 19th century. The Great Famine in Ireland, 1846–1851, caused by the failure of the potato crop over a few years, resulted in 1,000,000 dead and another 2,000,000 refugees fleeing to Britain, Australia and the United States.

==== 20th century ====
Famine still occurred in Eastern Europe during the 20th century. Droughts and famines in Imperial Russia are known to have happened every 10 to 13 years, with average droughts happening every 5 to 7 years. Russia experienced eleven major famines between 1845 and 1922, one of the worst being the famine of 1891–1892. The Russian famine of 1921–22 killed an estimated 5 million.

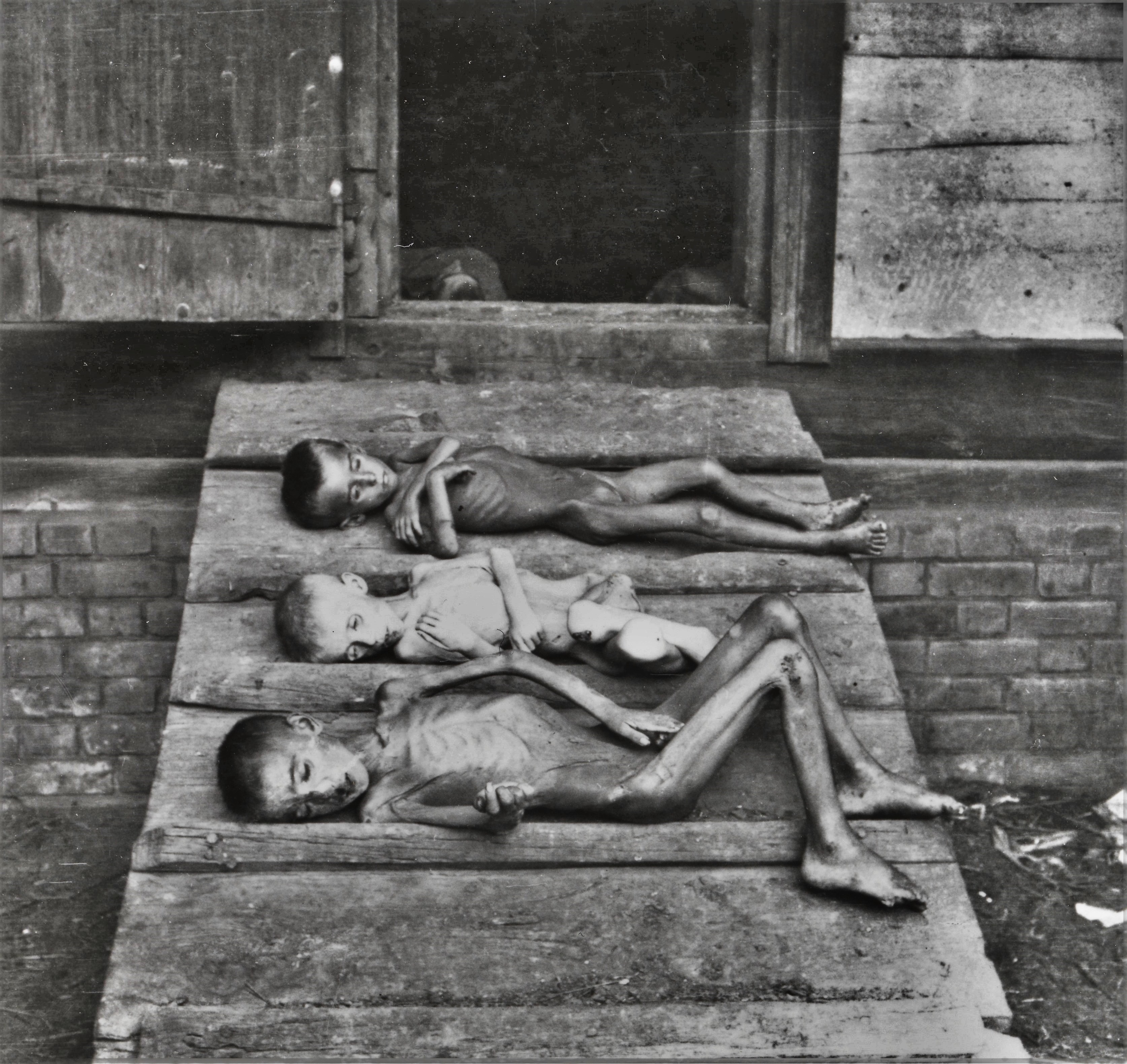
Victims of the Russian famine of 1921–1922 during the Russian Civil War

Famines continued in the Soviet era, the most notorious being the Holodomor in various parts of the country, especially the Volga, and the Ukrainian and northern Kazakh SSR's during the winter of 1932–1933. The Soviet famine of 1932–1933 is nowadays reckoned to have cost an estimated 6 million lives. The last major famine in the USSR happened in 1947 due to the severe drought and the mismanagement of grain reserves by the Soviet government.

The Hunger Plan, i.e. the Nazi plan to starve large sections of the Soviet population, caused the deaths of many. The Russian Academy of Sciences in 1995 reported civilian victims in the USSR at German hands, including Jews, totaled 13.7 million dead, 20% of the 68 million persons in the occupied USSR. This included 4.1 million famine and disease deaths in occupied territory. There were an additional estimated 3 million famine deaths in areas of the USSR not under German occupation.

The 872 days of the Siege of Leningrad (1941–1944) caused unparalleled famine in the Leningrad region through disruption of utilities, water, energy and food supplies. This resulted in the deaths of about one million people.

Famine also struck in Western Europe during the Second World War. In the Netherlands, the Hongerwinter of 1944 killed approximately 30,000 people. Some other areas of Europe also experienced famine at the same time. In Francoist Spain, a nationwide famine during 1939–1942 caused an estimated 200,000 deaths, with another famine occurring in 1946.

=== The Americas ===
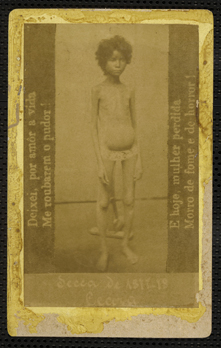
Malnourished child during Brazil's 1877–78 Grande Seca (Great Drought).

The pre-Columbian Americans often dealt with severe food shortages and famines. The persistent drought around 850 AD coincided with the collapse of Classic Maya civilization, and the famine of One Rabbit (AD 1454) was a major catastrophe in Mexico.

Famine conditions occurred in the territory of the present-day United States at Jamestown in the Colony of Virginia during the 1609–1610 Starving Time, during which roughly 88% of the English colonists died.

Brazil's 1877–78 Grande Seca (Great Drought), the worst in Brazil's history, caused approximately half a million deaths. The one from 1915 was devastating too.

=== Oceania ===
Easter Island was hit by a great famine between the 15th and 18th centuries. Hunger and subsequent cannibalism was caused by overpopulation and depletion of natural resources as a result of deforestation, partly because work on megalithic monuments required a lot of wood.

There are other documented episodes of famine in various islands of Polynesia, such as occurred in Kau, Hawaii in 1868.

According to Daniel Lord Smail, "'Famine cannibalism' was until recently a regular feature of life in the islands of the Massim near New Guinea and of some other societies of Southeast Asia and the Pacific."

When Russian explorer Otto von Kotzebue visited the Marshall Islands in Micronesia in 1817, he noted that Marshallese families practiced infanticide after the birth of a third child as a form of population planning due to frequent famines.

== Risk of future famine ==
YALE climate connections reports that, as of 2022, approximately 34% of the world's agricultural land is degraded. If current trends of soil degradation continue in Africa, the continent might be able to feed just 20% of its population by 2030, according to a WHO study in 2024. As of late 2007, increased farming for use in biofuels, along with world oil prices at nearly $100 a barrel, has pushed up the price of grain used to feed poultry and dairy cows and other cattle, causing higher prices of wheat (up 58%), soybean (up 32%), and maize (up 11%) over the year. In 2007 Food riots took place in many countries across the world. An epidemic of stem rust, which is destructive to wheat and is caused by race Ug99, has in 2007 spread across Africa and into Asia.

Beginning in the 20th century, nitrogen fertilizers, new pesticides, desert farming, and other agricultural technologies began to be used to increase food production, in part to combat famine. Between 1950 and 1984, as the Green Revolution influenced agriculture world grain production increased by 250%. Developed nations have shared these technologies with developing nations with a famine problem. However, as early as 1995, there were signs that these new developments may contribute to the decline of arable land (e.g. persistence of pesticides leading to soil contamination, salt accumulation due to irrigation, erosion).

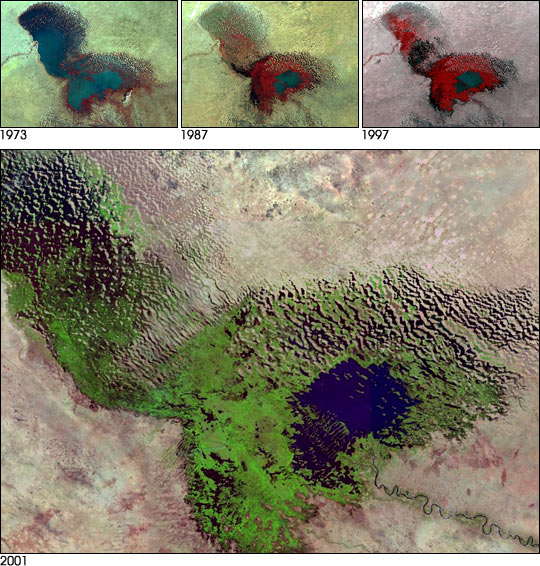
Lake Chad in a 2001 satellite image, with the actual lake in blue. The lake has shrunk by 95% since the 1960s.

In 1994, David Pimentel, professor of ecology and agriculture at Cornell University, and Mario Giampietro, senior researcher at the National Research Institute on Food and Nutrition (INRAN), estimated the maximum U.S. population for a sustainable economy at 200 million.

According to geologist Dale Allen Pfeiffer, coming decades could see rising food prices without relief and massive starvation on a global level. Water deficits, which are already spurring heavy grain imports in numerous smaller countries, may soon do the same in larger countries, such as China or India. The water tables are falling in many countries (including Northern China, the US, and India) due to widespread overconsumption. Other countries affected include Pakistan, Iran, and Mexico. This will eventually lead to water scarcity and cutbacks in grain harvest. Even while overexploiting its aquifers, China has developed a grain deficit, contributing to the upward pressure on grain prices. Most of the three billion people projected to be added worldwide by mid-century will be born in countries already experiencing water shortages.

After China and India, there is a second tier of smaller countries with large water deficits – Algeria, Egypt, Iran, Mexico, and Pakistan. Four of these already import a large share of their grain. Only Pakistan remains marginally self-sufficient. But with a population expanding by 4 million a year, it will also soon turn to the world market for grain. According to a UN climate report, the Himalayan glaciers that are the principal dry-season water sources of Asia's biggest rivers – Ganges, Indus, Brahmaputra, Yangtze, Mekong, Salween and Yellow – could disappear by 2350 as temperatures rise and human demand rises. (Note: Initial reports erroneously gave the year 2035 rather than the correct 2350.) Approximately 2.4 billion people live in the drainage basin of the Himalayan rivers. India, China, Pakistan, Afghanistan, Bangladesh, Nepal and Myanmar could experience floods followed by severe droughts in coming decades. In India alone, the Ganges provides water for drinking and farming for more than 500 million people.

Evan Fraser, a geographer at the University of Guelph in Ontario, Canada, explores the ways in which climate change may affect future famines. To do this, he draws on a range of historic cases where relatively small environmental problems triggered famines as a way of creating theoretical links between climate and famine in the future. Drawing on situations as diverse as the Great Famine of Ireland, a series of weather induced famines in Asia during the late 19th century, and famines in Ethiopia during the 1980s, he concludes there are three "lines of defense" that protect a community's food security from environmental change. The first line of defense is the agro-ecosystem on which food is produced: diverse ecosystems with well managed soils high in organic matter tend to be more resilient. The second line of defense is the wealth and skills of individual households: If those households affected by bad weather such as drought have savings or skills they may be able to do all right despite the bad weather. The final line of defense is created by the formal institutions present in a society. Governments, churches, or NGOs must be willing and able to mount effective relief efforts. Pulling this together, Evan Fraser argues that if an ecosystem is resilient enough, it may be able to withstand weather-related shocks. But if these shocks overwhelm the ecosystem's line of defense, it is necessary for the household to adapt using its skills and savings. If a problem is too big for the family or household, then people must rely on the third line of defense, which is whether or not the formal institutions present in a society are able to provide help. Evan Fraser concludes that in almost every situation where an environmental problem triggered a famine you see a failure in each of these three lines of defense. Hence, understanding how climate change may cause famines in the future requires combining both an assessment of local socio-economic and environmental factors along with climate models that predict where bad weather may occur in the future.

The COVID-19 pandemic, alongside lockdowns and travel restrictions, has prevented movement of aid and greatly impacted food production. As a result, several famines are forecast, which the United Nations called a crisis "of biblical proportions", or "hunger pandemic". This pandemic, in conjunction with the 2019-20 locust infestations and several ongoing armed conflicts, is predicted to form the worst series of famines since the Great Chinese Famine, affecting between 10 and 20 percent of the global population in some way.

Western nations suspended humanitarian aid to Afghanistan following the Taliban's takeover of the country in August 2021. The United States has frozen about $9 billion in assets belonging to the Afghan central banks, blocking the Taliban from accessing billions of dollars held in U.S. bank accounts. In October 2021, more than half of Afghanistan's 39 million people faced an acute food shortage. On 11 November 2021, the Human Rights Watch reported that Afghanistan is facing widespread famine due to collapsed economy and broken banking system. The UN World Food Programme has also issued multiple warnings of worsening food insecurity.

== Causes ==
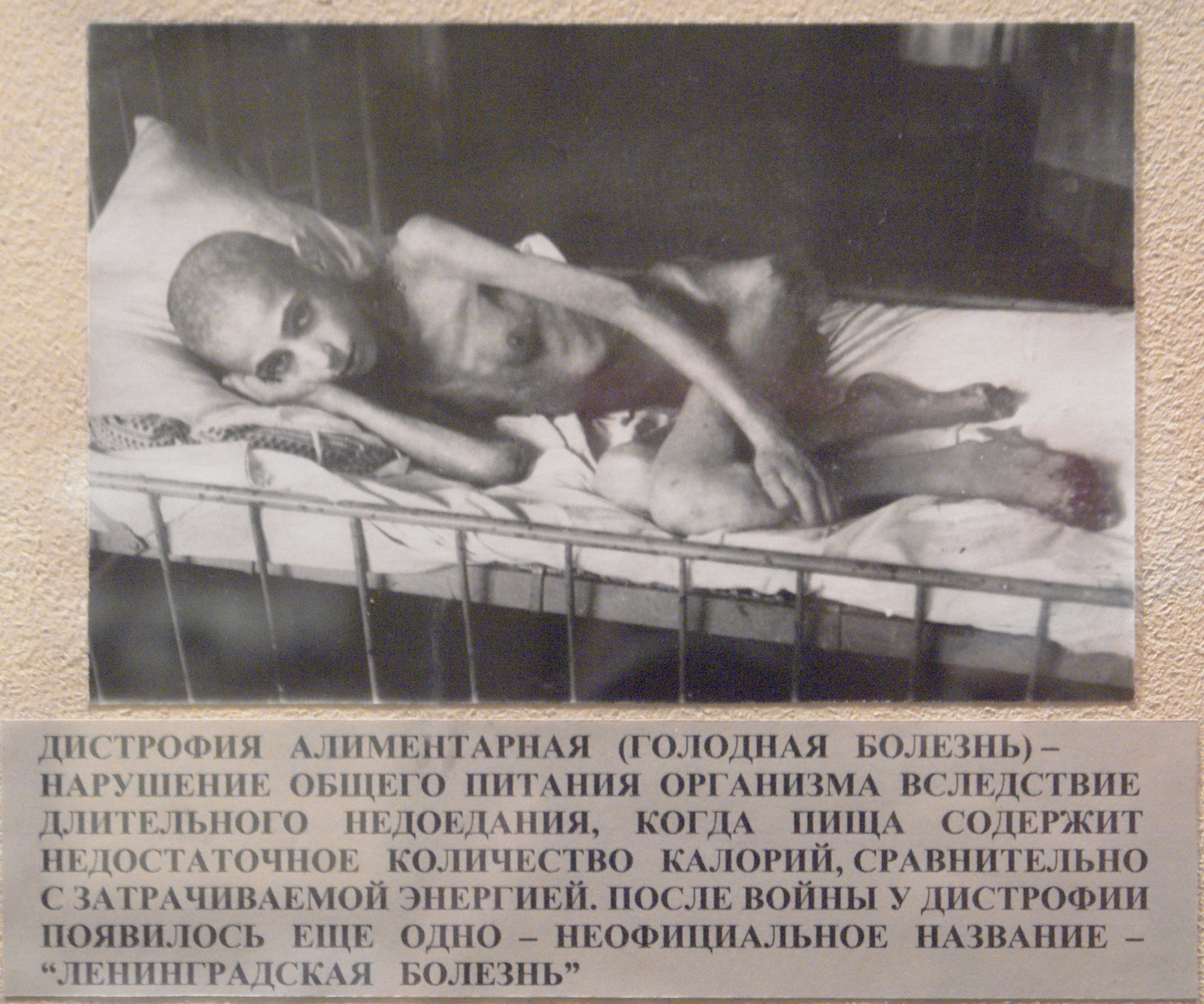
A victim of starvation in besieged Leningrad suffering from dystrophia in 1941.

Definitions of famines are based on three different categories—these include food supply-based, food consumption-based and mortality-based definitions. Some definitions of famines are:

- Blix – Widespread food shortage leading to significant rise in regional death rates.
- Brown and Eckholm – Sudden, sharp reduction in food supply resulting in widespread hunger.
- Scrimshaw – Sudden collapse in level of food consumption of large numbers of people.
- Ravallion – Unusually high mortality with unusually severe threat to food intake of some segments of a population.
- Cuny – A set of conditions that occurs when large numbers of people in a region cannot obtain sufficient food, resulting in widespread, acute malnutrition.

Food shortages in a population are caused either by a lack of food or by difficulties in food distribution; it may be worsened by natural climate fluctuations and by extreme political conditions related to oppressive government or warfare. The conventional explanation until 1981 for the cause of famines was the Food availability decline (FAD) hypothesis. The assumption was that the central cause of all famines was a decline in food availability. However, FAD could not explain why only a certain section of the population such as the agricultural laborer was affected by famines while others were insulated from famines. Based on the studies of some recent famines, the decisive role of FAD has been questioned and it has been suggested that the causal mechanism for precipitating starvation includes many variables other than just decline of food availability. According to this view, famines are a result of entitlements, the theory being proposed is called the "failure of exchange entitlements" or FEE. A person may own various commodities that can be exchanged in a market economy for the other commodities he or she needs. The exchange can happen via trading or production or through a combination of the two. These entitlements are called trade-based or production-based entitlements. Per this proposed view, famines are precipitated due to a breakdown in the ability of the person to exchange his entitlements. An example of famines due to FEE is the inability of an agricultural laborer to exchange his primary entitlement, i.e., labor for rice when his employment became erratic or was eliminated.

According to the Physicians for Social Responsibility (PSR), global climate change is additionally challenging the Earth's ability to produce food, potentially leading to famine.

Some elements make a particular region more vulnerable to famine. These include poverty, population growth, an inappropriate social infrastructure, a suppressive political regime, and a weak or under-prepared government. Autocracy, corruption and government ineffectiveness are associated with famine mortality.

According to Oxfam International, commenting on a Famine Early Warning Systems Network (FEWS NET) report, "Famines are not natural phenomena, they are catastrophic political failures."

=== Population pressure ===
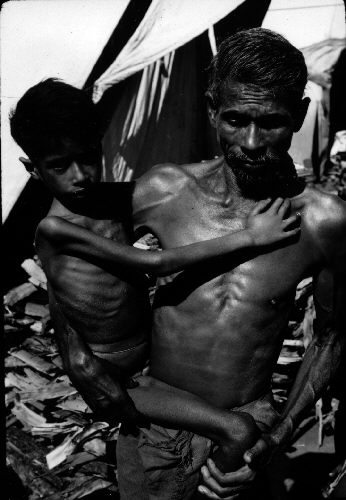
A child suffering extreme starvation in India, 1972

Thomas Malthus's Essay on the Principle of Population has made popular the theory of the Malthusian catastrophe—that many famines are caused by imbalance of food production compared to the large populations of countries whose population exceeds the regional carrying capacity. However, anthropologist Alex de Waal, executive director of the World Peace Foundation, refutes the Malthus theory, looking instead to political factors as major causes of recent (over the last 150 years) famines. Historically, famines have occurred from agricultural problems such as drought, crop failure, or pestilence. Changing weather patterns, the ineffectiveness of medieval governments in dealing with crises, wars, and epidemic diseases such as the Black Death helped to cause hundreds of famines in Europe during the Middle Ages, including 95 in Britain and 75 in France. In France, the Hundred Years' War, crop failures and epidemics reduced the population by two-thirds. Economist Amartya Sen has also argued that sustained famines historically have been caused by political instability and repressive political regimes rather than overpopulation.

The failure of a harvest or change in conditions, such as drought, can create a situation whereby large numbers of people continue to live where the carrying capacity of the land has temporarily dropped radically. Famine is often associated with subsistence agriculture. The total absence of agriculture in an economically strong area does not cause famine; Arizona and other wealthy regions import the vast majority of their food, since such regions produce sufficient economic goods for trade.

Famines have also been caused by volcanism. The 1815 eruption of the Mount Tambora volcano in Indonesia caused crop failures and famines worldwide and caused the worst famine of the 19th century. The current consensus of the scientific community is that the aerosols and dust released into the upper atmosphere causes cooler temperatures by preventing the sun's energy from reaching the ground. The same mechanism is theorized to be caused by very large meteorite impacts to the extent of causing mass extinctions.

=== State-sponsored famines ===
In certain cases, such as the Great Leap Forward in China (which produced the largest famine in absolute numbers), Francoist Spain's years of hunger, North Korea in the mid-1990s, or Zimbabwe in the early-2000s, famine can occur because of government policy.

The government's forced collectivization of agriculture was one of the main causes of the Soviet famine of 1932–1933.

According to Simon Payaslian, a tentative scholarly consensus classifies the Soviet famine (at least in Ukraine where 2.5 to 4 million perished) as a genocide, although some scholars say that it remains a significant issue in modern politics and dispute whether Soviet policies would fall under the legal definition of genocide. Several scholars have disputed that the famine was a genocidal act by the Soviet government, including J. Arch Getty, Stephen G. Wheatcroft, R. W. Davies, and Mark Tauger. Getty says that the "overwhelming weight of opinion among scholars working in the new archives ... is that the terrible famine of the 1930s was the result of Stalinist bungling and rigidity rather than some genocidal plan." Wheatcroft says that the Soviet government's policies during the famine were criminal acts of fraud and manslaughter, though not outright murder or genocide. (Note: "We may well ask whether having revolutionarily high expectations is a crime? Of course it is, if it leads to an increase in the level of deaths, as a result of insufficient care being taken to safeguard the lives of those put at risk when the high ambitions failed to be fulfilled, and especially when it was followed by a cover-up. The same goes for not adjusting policy to unfolding evidence of crisis. But these are crimes of manslaughter and fraud rather than of murder. How heinous are they in comparison, say, with shooting over 600,000 citizens wrongly identified as enemies in 1937–8, or in shooting 25,000 Poles identified as a security risk in 1940, when there was no doubt as to the outcome of the orders? The conventional view is that manslaughter is less heinous than cold blooded murder.") In regard to the Soviet state's reaction to this crisis, Wheatcroft comments: "The good harvest of 1930 led to the decisions to export substantial amounts of grain in 1931 and 1932. The Soviet leaders also assumed that the wholesale socialisation of livestock farming would lead to the rapid growth of meat and dairy production. These policies failed, and the Soviet leaders attributed the failure not to their own lack of realism but to the machinations of enemies. Peasant resistance was blamed on the kulaks, and the increased use of force on a large scale almost completely replaced attempts at persuasion." Wheatcroft says that Soviet authorities refused to scale down grain procurements despite the low harvest, and that "[Wheatcroft and his colleague's] work has confirmed – if confirmation were needed – that the grain campaign in 1932/33 was unprecedentedly harsh and repressive."

Joseph Stalin biographer Stephen Kotkin supports a similar view, stating that while "there is no question of Stalin's responsibility for the famine" and many deaths could have been prevented if not for the "insufficient" and counterproductive Soviet measures, there is no evidence for Stalin's intention to kill the Ukrainians deliberately. While Mark Tauger considers the famine to be the result of natural factors stating that "the harsh 1932–1933 procurements only displaced the famine from urban areas" but the low harvest "made a famine inevitable". Ultimately concluding that it is difficult to accept the famine "as the result of the 1932 grain procurements and as a conscious act of genocide" he still concurs with Wheatcroft that "the regime was still responsible for the deprivation and suffering of the Soviet population in the early 1930s", and "if anything, these data show that the effects of [collectivization and forced industrialization] were worse than has been assumed."

In 1958 in China, Mao Zedong's Communist Government launched the Great Leap Forward campaign, aimed at rapidly industrializing the country. The government forcibly took control of agriculture. Barely enough grain was left for the peasants, and starvation occurred in many rural areas. Exportation of grain continued despite the famine and the government attempted to conceal it. While the famine is attributed to unintended consequences, it is believed that the government refused to acknowledge the problem, thereby further contributing to the deaths. In many instances, peasants were persecuted. Between 20 and 45 million people perished in this famine, making it one of the deadliest famines to date.

Historian and journalists, such as Seumas Milne and Jon Wiener, have criticized the emphasis on communism when assigning blame for famines. In a 2002 article for The Guardian, Milne mentions "the moral blindness displayed towards the record of colonialism", and he writes: "If Lenin and Stalin are regarded as having killed those who died of hunger in the famines of the 1920s and 1930s, then Churchill is certainly responsible for the 4 million deaths in the avoidable Bengal famine of 1943. Weiner makes a similar assertion while comparing the Holodomor and the Bengal famine of 1943, stating that Winston Churchill's role in the Bengal famine "seems similar to Stalin's role in the Ukrainian famine". Historian Mike Davis, author of Late Victorian Holocausts, draws comparisons between the Great Chinese Famine and the Indian famines of the late 19th century, arguing that in both instances the governments which oversaw the response to the famines deliberately chose not to alleviate conditions and as such bear responsibility for the scale of deaths in said famines. According to Jason Hickel and Dylan Sullivan, the number excess deaths during the apex of British colonialism in India rise to around 100 million.

Malawi ended its famine by subsidizing farmers despite the strictures imposed by the World Bank. During the 1973 Wollo Famine in Ethiopia, food was shipped out of Wollo to the capital city of Addis Ababa, where it could command higher prices. In the late-1970s and early-1980s, residents of the dictatorships of Ethiopia and Sudan suffered massive famines, but the democracy of Botswana avoided them, despite also suffering a severe drop in national food production. In Somalia, famine occurred because of a failed state.

The famine in Yemen is a direct result of the Saudi Arabian-led intervention in Yemen and the blockade imposed by Saudi Arabia and its allies, including the United States. According to the UN, 130 children under five years of age were dying from starvation and starvation related diseases every day by the end of 2017, with 50,000 dead for the year. As of October 2018, half the population is at risk of famine.

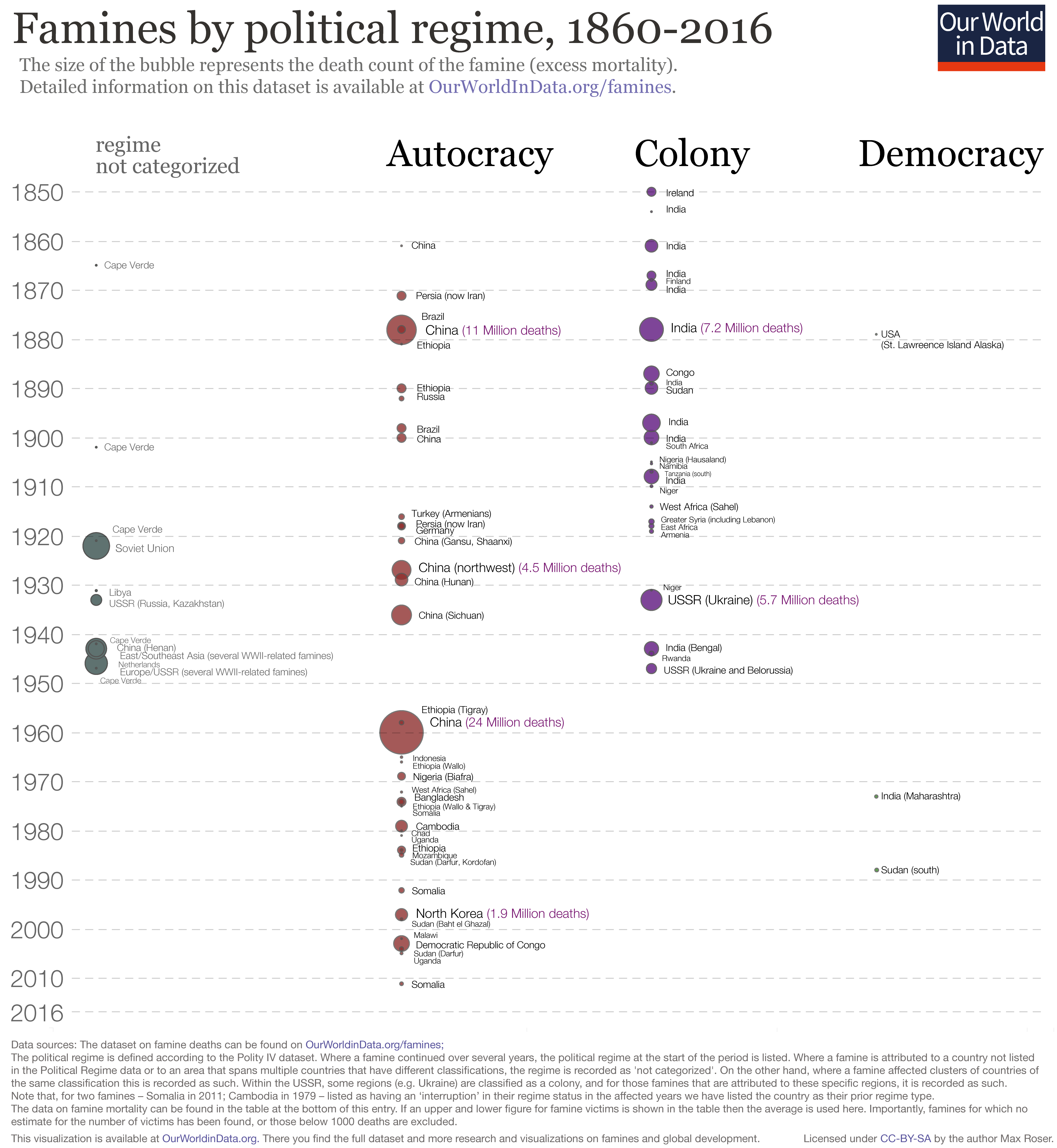
Famines since 1850 by political regime. Large catastrophic famines have occurred predominantly in autocratic regimes.

Israel's blockade of Gaza and the war between Israel and Hamas led to a famine in the Gaza Strip in 2024. On 16 January 2024, UN experts accused Israel of "destroying Gaza's food system and using food as a weapon against the Palestinian people". The UN-backed IPC confirmed famine is taking place in Gaza on 22 August 2025.

According to Amartya Sen (1999), "there has never been a famine in a functioning multiparty democracy". Hasell and Roser have demonstrated that while there have been a few minor exceptions, famines rarely occur in democratic systems but are strongly correlated with autocratic and colonial systems.

=== Economic sanctions ===
Economic sanctions are state or UN sanctioned measures to pressure a targeted country to submit to political demands. Because such measures often involve limiting imports and exports to "crash" or inflict pain on the targeted nation's economy. This can restrict the targeted nation's economic development and make it more difficult for their population to access food. Economic sanctions have been blamed for contributing to the North Korean famine in the 1990s. The effects of sanctions against Iraq in the 1990s on mortality are disputed. Following the Taliban's takeover of Afghanistan in August 2021, Human Rights Watch warned that Afghanistan was at risk of famine and urged the UN, World Bank, US and other countries to modify their sanctions to help prevent famine.

== Famine prevention ==
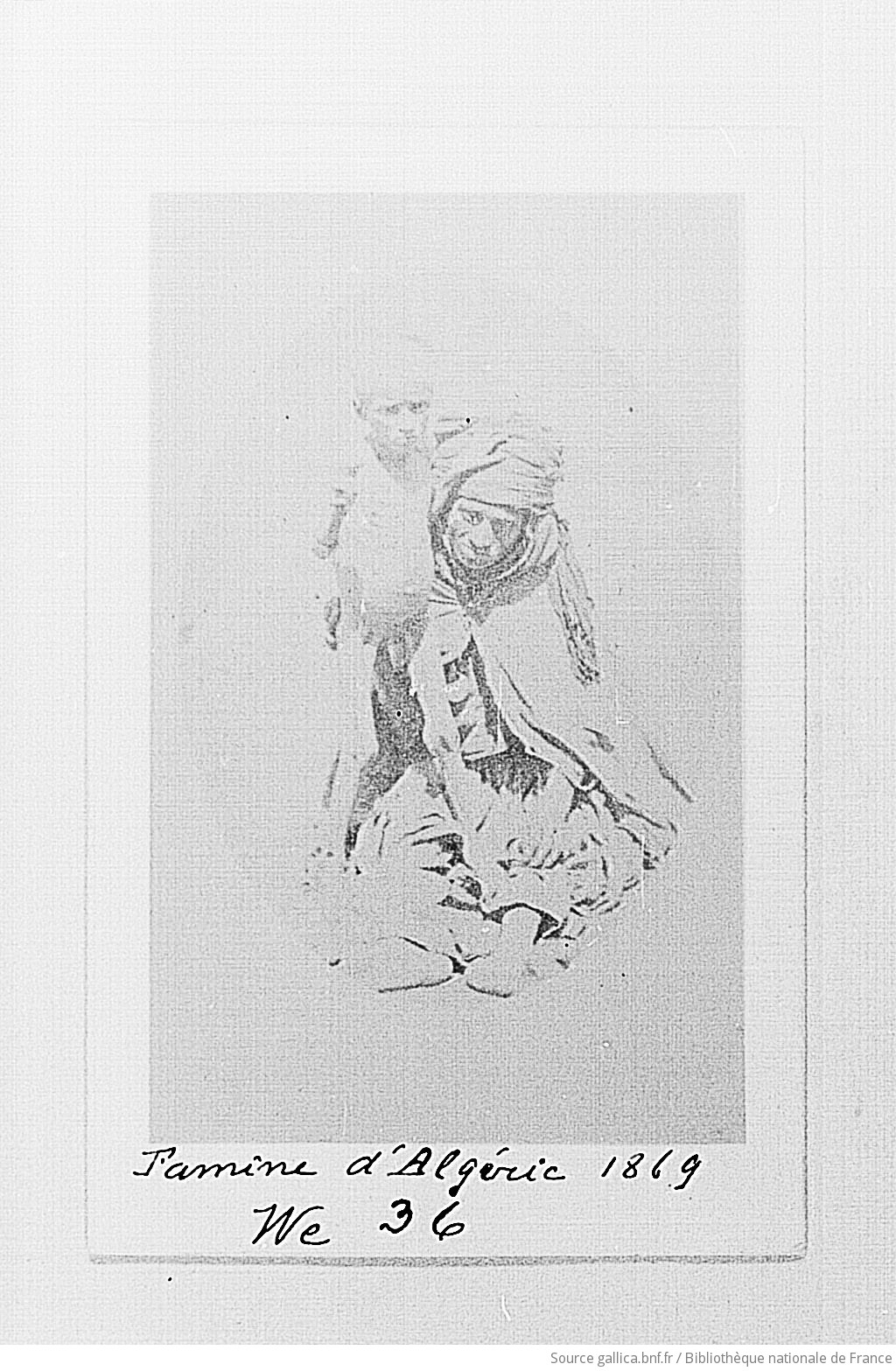
A starving child during the 1869 famine in Algeria.

Relief technologies, including immunization, improved public health infrastructure, general food rations and supplementary feeding for vulnerable children, has provided temporary mitigation to the mortality impact of famines, while leaving their economic consequences unchanged, and not solving the underlying issue of too large a regional population relative to food production capability. Humanitarian crises may also arise from genocide campaigns, civil wars, agro-terrorism, refugee flows and episodes of extreme violence and state collapse, creating famine conditions among the affected populations.

Despite repeated stated intentions by the world's leaders to end hunger and famine, famine remains a chronic threat in much of Africa, Eastern Europe, the Southeast, South Asia, and the Middle East. In July 2005, the Famine Early Warning Systems Network (FEWS NET) labelled Niger with emergency status, as well as Chad, Ethiopia, South Sudan, Somalia and Zimbabwe. In January 2006, the United Nations Food and Agriculture Organization warned that 11 million people in Somalia, Kenya, Djibouti and Ethiopia were in danger of starvation due to the combination of severe drought and military conflicts. In 2006, the most serious humanitarian crisis in Africa was in Sudan's region Darfur.

Frances Moore Lappé, later co-founder of the Institute for Food and Development Policy (Food First) argued in Diet for a Small Planet (1971) that vegetarian diets can provide food for larger populations, with the same resources, compared to omnivorous diets.

Noting that modern famines are sometimes aggravated by misguided economic policies, political design to impoverish or marginalize certain populations, or acts of war, political economists have investigated the political conditions under which famine is prevented. Economist Amartya Sen (Note: Sen is known for his assertion that famines do not occur in democracies in much the same way that Adam Smith is associated with the "invisible hand" and Joseph Schumpeter with "creative destruction".) states that the liberal institutions that exist in India, including competitive elections and a free press, have played a major role in preventing famine in that country since independence. Alex de Waal has developed this theory to focus on the "political contract" between rulers and people that ensures famine prevention, noting the rarity of such political contracts in Africa, and the danger that international relief agencies will undermine such contracts through removing the locus of accountability for famines from national governments.

The demographic impacts of famine are sharp. Mortality is concentrated among children and the elderly. A consistent demographic fact is that in all recorded famines, male mortality exceeds female, even in those populations (such as northern India and Pakistan) where there is a male longevity advantage during normal times. Reasons for this may include greater female resilience under the pressure of malnutrition, and possibly female's naturally higher percentage of body fat. Famine is also accompanied by lower fertility. Famines therefore leave the reproductive core of a population—adult women—lesser affected compared to other population categories, and post-famine periods are often characterized a "rebound" with increased births.

Even though the theories of Thomas Malthus would predict that famines reduce the size of the population commensurate with available food resources, in fact even the most severe famines have rarely dented population growth for more than a few years. The mortality in China in 1958–61, Bengal in 1943, and Ethiopia in 1983–85 was all made up by a growing population over just a few years. Of greater long-term demographic impact is emigration: Ireland was chiefly depopulated after the 1840s famines by waves of emigration.

=== Overall food production ===
The Green Revolution significantly increased food production, enabling it to outpace population growth and avert widespread famine, particularly in the latter half of the 20th century.

Globally, the amount of food produced per person has kept rising, despite a growing world population. A local crop failure does not cause a famine unless there is also a lack of money to buy food from elsewhere. A war or political oppression can also disrupt distribution of otherwise adequate global supplies.

=== Food security ===
Long term measures to improve food security, include investment in modern agriculture techniques, such as fertilizers and irrigation, but can also include strategic national food storage.

World Bank strictures restrict government subsidies for farmers, and increasing use of fertilizers is opposed by some environmental groups because of its unintended consequences: adverse effects on water supplies and habitat.

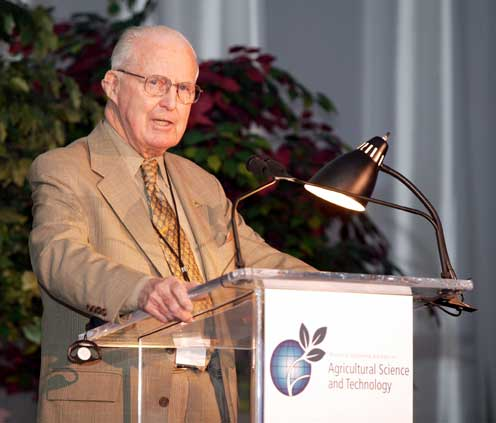
Norman Borlaug, father of the Green Revolution, is often credited with saving over a billion people worldwide from starvation.

The effort to bring modern agricultural techniques found in the Western world, such as nitrogen fertilizers and pesticides, to the Indian Sub-continent, called the Green Revolution, resulted in decreases in malnutrition similar to those seen earlier in Western nations. This was possible because of existing infrastructure and institutions that are in short supply in Africa, such as a system of roads or public seed companies that made seeds available. Supporting farmers in areas of food insecurity, through such measures as free or subsidized fertilizers and seeds, increases food harvest and reduces food prices.

The energy for the Green Revolution was provided by fossil fuels in the form of fertilizers (natural gas), pesticides (oil), and hydrocarbon fueled irrigation. The development of synthetic nitrogen fertilizer has significantly supported global population growth — it has been estimated that almost half the people on the Earth are currently fed as a result of synthetic nitrogen fertilizer use.

World population supported with and without synthetic nitrogen fertilizers.

The World Bank and some rich nations press nations that depend on them for aid to cut back or eliminate subsidized agricultural inputs such as fertilizer, in the name of privatization even as the United States and Europe extensively subsidized their own farmers.

=== Relief ===
There is a growing realization among aid groups that giving cash or cash vouchers instead of food is a cheaper, faster, and more efficient way to deliver help to the hungry, particularly in areas where food is available but unaffordable. The United Nations World Food Programme, the biggest non-governmental distributor of food, announced that it will begin distributing cash and vouchers instead of food in some areas, which Josette Sheeran, WFP's former executive director, described as a "revolution" in food aid. The aid agency Concern Worldwide is piloting a method through a mobile phone operator, Safaricom, which runs a money transfer program that allows cash to be sent from one part of the country to another.

However, for people in a drought living a long way from and with limited access to markets, delivering food may be the most appropriate way to help. Fred Cuny stated that "the chances of saving lives at the outset of a relief operation are greatly reduced when food is imported. By the time it arrives in the country and gets to people, many will have died." US Law, which requires buying food at home rather than where the hungry live, is inefficient because approximately half of what is spent goes for transport. Fred Cuny further pointed out "studies of every recent famine have shown that food was available in-country—though not always in the immediate food deficit area" and "even though by local standards the prices are too high for the poor to purchase it, it would usually be cheaper for a donor to buy the hoarded food at the inflated price than to import it from abroad."

Deficient micronutrients can be provided through fortifying foods. Fortifying foods such as peanut butter sachets (see Plumpy'Nut) have revolutionized emergency feeding in humanitarian emergencies because they can be eaten directly from the packet, do not require refrigeration or mixing with scarce clean water, can be stored for years and, vitally, can be absorbed by extremely ill children.

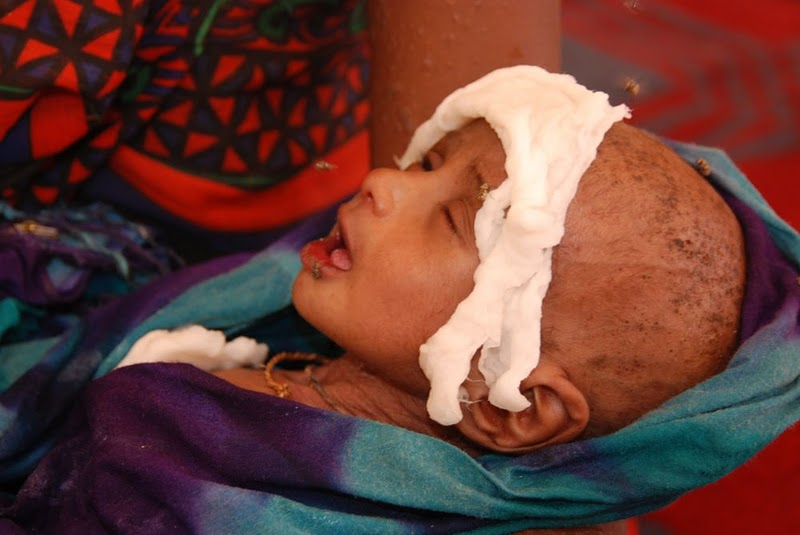
A Somali boy receiving treatment for malnutrition at a health facility in Hilaweyn during the drought of 2011.

WHO and other sources recommend that malnourished children—and adults who also have diarrhea—drink rehydration solution, and continue to eat, in addition to antibiotics, and zinc supplements. There is a special oral rehydration solution called ReSoMal which has less sodium and more potassium than standard solution. However, if the diarrhea is severe, the standard solution is preferable as the person needs the extra sodium. Obviously, this is a judgment call best made by a physician, and using either solution is better than doing nothing. Zinc supplements often can help reduce the duration and severity of diarrhea, and Vitamin A can also be helpful. The World Health Organization underlines the importance of a person with diarrhea continuing to eat, with a 2005 publication for physicians stating: "Food should never be withheld and the child's usual foods should not be diluted. Breastfeeding should always be continued."

Ethiopia has been pioneering a program that has now become part of the World Bank's prescribed recipe for coping with a food crisis and had been seen by aid organizations as a model of how to best help hungry nations. Through the country's main food assistance program, the Productive Safety Net Program, Ethiopia has been giving rural residents who are chronically short of food, a chance to work for food or cash. Foreign aid organizations like the World Food Program were then able to buy food locally from surplus areas to distribute in areas with a shortage of food.

The Green Revolution was widely viewed as an answer to famine in the 1970s and 1980s. Between 1950 and 1984, hybrid strains of high-yielding crops transformed agriculture around the globe and world grain production increased by 250%. Some criticize the process, stating that these new high-yielding crops require more chemical fertilizers and pesticides, which can harm the environment. Although these high-yielding crops make it technically possible to feed more people, there are indications that regional food production has peaked in many world sectors, due to certain strategies associated with intensive agriculture such as groundwater overdrafting and overuse of pesticides and other agricultural chemicals.

=== Levels of food insecurity ===
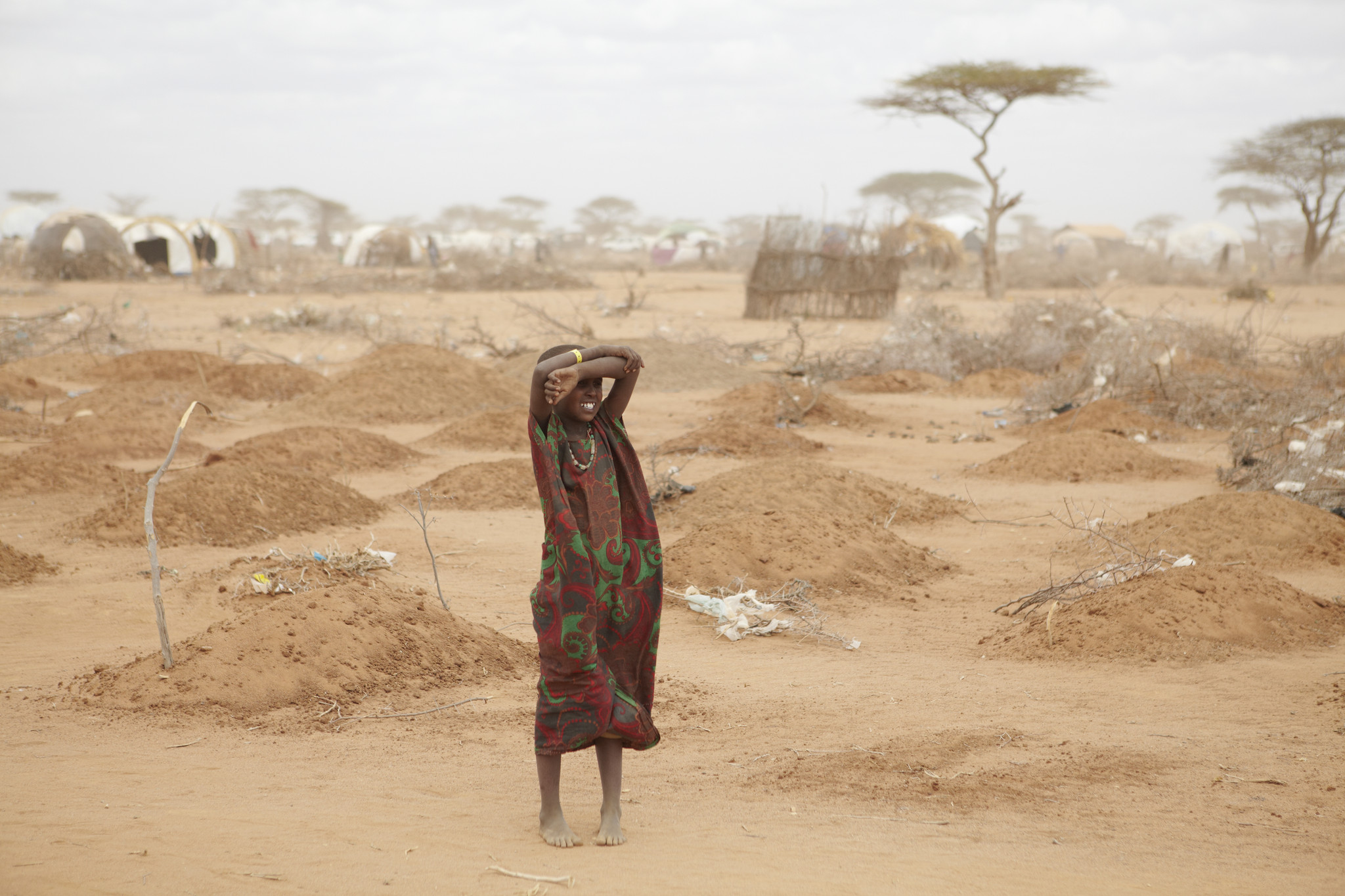
Freshly-dug graves for child victims of the 2011 East Africa drought, Dadaab refugee camp, Kenya

In modern times, local and political governments and non-governmental organizations that deliver famine relief have limited resources with which to address the multiple situations of food insecurity that are occurring simultaneously. Various methods of categorizing the gradations of food security have thus been used in order to most efficiently allocate food relief. One of the earliest were the Indian Famine Codes devised by the British in the 1880s. The Codes listed three stages of food insecurity: near-scarcity, scarcity and famine, and were highly influential in the creation of subsequent famine warning or measurement systems. The early warning system developed to monitor the region inhabited by the Turkana people in northern Kenya also has three levels, but links each stage to a pre-planned response to mitigate the crisis and prevent its deterioration

The experiences of famine relief organizations throughout the world over the 1980s and 1990s resulted in at least two major developments: the "livelihoods approach" and the increased use of nutrition indicators to determine the severity of a crisis. Individuals and groups in food stressful situations will attempt to cope by rationing consumption, finding alternative means to supplement income, etc., before taking desperate measures, such as selling off plots of agricultural land. When all means of self-support are exhausted, the affected population begins to migrate in search of food or fall victim to outright mass starvation. Famine may thus be viewed partially as a social phenomenon, involving markets, the price of food, and social support structures. A second lesson drawn was the increased use of rapid nutrition assessments, in particular of children, to give a quantitative measure of the famine's severity.

Since 2003, many of the most important organizations in famine relief, such as the World Food Programme and the U.S. Agency for International Development, have adopted a five-level scale measuring intensity and magnitude. The intensity scale uses both livelihoods' measures and measurements of mortality and child malnutrition to categorize a situation as food secure, food insecure, food crisis, famine, severe famine, and extreme famine. The number of deaths determines the magnitude designation, with under 1000 fatalities defining a "minor famine" and a "catastrophic famine" resulting in over 1,000,000 deaths.

== Society and culture ==
Famine personified as an allegory is found in some cultures: Famine is one of the Four Horsemen of the Apocalypse in Christian tradition, a man riding a black horse holding a balance scale; the fear gorta of Irish folklore; or the Wendigo of Algonquian tradition.

=== Effects on society ===
A 2023 systematic review and meta-analysis has shown that prenatal famine exposure is associated with an increased risk of mental disorders (such as depression and schizophrenia) and changes in DNA methylation, that is further exacerbating the impact of famine on human health and nutrition.

== See also ==
- Famine food
- 2007–2008 world food price crisis
- Agriculture and population limits
- Atmit (a porridge used to fight famine)
- Democide
- Famine Early Warning Systems Network
- Food prices
- Food race
- Food security
- Global Hunger Index
- History of food
- Integrated Food Security Phase Classification
- List of famines
- Malthusianism
- Overpopulation
- Global catastrophic risk
- Starvation
- Subsistence crisis
- World Vision Famine events

== Sources and further reading ==
- Alfani, Guido; Ó Gráda, Cormac (2018). "The timing and causes of famines in Europe". Nature Sustainability. 1 (6): 283–288. Bibcode:2018NatSu...1..283A. doi:10.1038/s41893-018-0078-0. S2CID 134922211.
- Arnold, David. Famine: Social Crisis and Historical Change (Basil Blackwell, 1988).
- Ashton, Basil, et al. "Famine in China, 1958–61." in The Population of Modern China (Springer, Boston, MA, 1992) pp. 225–271.
- Asimov, Isaac, Asimov's New Guide to Science, pp. 152–53, Basic Books, Inc. : 1984.
- Bhatia, B.M. (1985) Famines in India: A Study in Some Aspects of the Economic History of India With Special Reference to Food Problem (Delhi: Konark Publishers).
- Blix, Gunnar; Svensk näringsforskning, Stiftelsen (1971), Famine: A symposium dealing with nutrition and relief operations in times of disaster, vol. 9, Sweden: Almqvist & Wiksell
- Brown, Benjamin (18 March 2024). "'Trucks are stopped, people are dying': Top EU diplomat claims Israel is using starvation as weapon of war". CNN. Archived from the original on 21 March 2024.
- Brown, Lester Russell; Eckholm, Erik P. (1974). By Bread Alone. Praeger. ISBN 978-0-275-63640-1.
- Campbell, David. "The iconography of famine." in Picturing Atrocity: Photography in Crisis (2012): 79–92 online.
- Chaudhari, B. B (1984). Desai, Meghnad; Rudolph, Susanne Hoeber; Rudra, Ashok (eds.). Agrarian power and agricultural productivity in South Asia. Vol. 1. University of California Press. ISBN 978-0-520-05369-4.
- Conquest, Robert. The Harvest of Sorrow: Soviet Collectivization and the Terror-Famine (Oxford University Press, 1986).
- Cuny, Frederick C; Hill, Richard B (1999), Famine, Conflict, and Response: a Basic Guide, West Hartford, Conn.: Kumarian Press, ISBN 978-1-56549-090-1
- Davis, Mike, Late Victorian Holocausts: El Niño Famines and the Making of the Third World, London, Verso, 2002
- De Waal, Alexander. Famine Crimes: Politics & the Disaster Relief Industry in Africa (Indiana University Press, 1997).
- De Waal, Alexander. Famine that Kills: Darfur, Sudan (2nd ed. 2005) online
- Dikötter, Frank. Mao's Great Famine: The History of China's Most Devastating Catastrophe, 1958–62 (2011) online
- Dutt, Romesh C. Open Letters to Lord Curzon on Famines and Land Assessments in India, first published 1900, 2005 edition by Adamant Media Corporation, Elibron Classics Series, ISBN 1-4021-5115-2.
- Dutt, Romesh C. The Economic History of India Under Early British Rule, first published 1902, 2001 edition by Routledge, ISBN 0-415-24493-5
- Edgerton-Tarpley, Kathryn, and Cormac O'gr. Tears from Iron: Cultural Responses to Famine in Nineteenth-Century China (U of California Press, 2008).
- Fegan, Melissa. Literature and the Irish Famine 1845–1919 (Clarendon Press, 2002).
- Encyclopædia Britannica (2010). "Food-availability decline". Encyclopedia Britannica.
- Ganson, Nicholas, The Soviet Famine of 1946–47 in Global and Historical Perspective. New York: Palgrave Macmillan, 2009. (ISBN 0-230-61333-0)
- Genady Golubev and Nikolai Dronin, Geography of Droughts and Food Problems in Russia (1900–2000), Report of the International Project on Global Environmental Change and Its Threat to Food and Water Security in Russia (February 2004).
- Gráda, Cormac Ó. Famine: A Short History (Princeton University Press, 2009).
- Greenough, Paul R., Prosperity and Misery in Modern Bengal. The Famine of 1943–1944 (Oxford University Press, 1982).
- Haggard, Stephan, and Marcus Noland. Famine in North Korea: Markets, Aid, and Reform (Columbia University Press, 2007).
- Harrison, G. Ainsworth. Famine, Oxford University Press, 1988.
- Iliffe, John. "Famine in Zimbabwe, 1890–1960". (1987).
- Jordan, William Chester. The Great Famine: Northern Europe in the Early Fourteenth Century. (Princeton University Press, 1997).
- Keen, David. The Benefits of Famine: A Political Economy of Famine and Relief in Southwestern Sudan 1983–89 (James Currey, 2008).
- Kinealy, Christine (1995). This Great Calamity: The Irish Famine 1845–52. Dublin: Gill & Macmillan. ISBN 1-57098-034-9.
- Larson, Nina (19 March 2024). "Israel May Be Using Starvation As 'Weapon Of War': UN". Barron's. Agence France-Presse. Archived from the original on 21 March 2024.
- LeBlanc, Steven, Constant Battles: The Myth of the Peaceful, Noble Savage, St. Martin's Press (2003) argues that recurring famines have been the major cause of warfare since paleolithic times. ISBN 0-312-31089-7
- Lassa, Jonatan (3 July 2006). "Famine, drought, malnutrition: Defining and fighting hunger". The Jakarta Post. Archived from the original on 16 February 2009.
- Li, Lillian M. Fighting Famine in North China: State, Market, and Environmental Decline, 1690s–1990s (Stanford UP), 2007 ISBN 978-0-8047-5304-3.
- Lucas, Henry S. "The great European famine of 1315, 1316, and 1317." Speculum 5.4 (1930): 343–377.
- Mallory, Walter H. China: Land of famine (1926) online.
- Marcus, David. "Famine crimes in international law." American Journal of International Law (2003): 245–281. online
- Massing, Michael (2003). "Does Democracy Avert Famine?". The New York Times.
- Mead, Margaret. "The Changing Significance of Food". American Scientist. (March–April 1970). pp. 176–89.
- Meng, Xin, Nancy Qian, and Pierre Yared. "The institutional causes of China's great famine, 1959–1961". Review of Economic Studies 82.4 (2015): 1568–1611. online
- Ray, James Arthur; Sivertsen, Linda (2008). Harmonic Wealth: The Secret of Attracting the Life You Want. Hyperion. ISBN 978-1-4013-2264-9.
- Mishra, Vimal; et al. (2019). "Drought and Famine in India, 1870–2016". Geophysical Research Letters. 46 (4): 2075–2083. Bibcode:2019GeoRL..46.2075M. doi:10.1029/2018GL081477. S2CID 133752333.
- Moon, William. "Origins of the Great North Korean Famine". North Korean Review
- Newby, A.G. Finland's Great Famine, 1856-68 (Palgrave Macmillan, 2023).
- Padmanabhan, S. Y. "The great Bengal famine." Annual Review of Phytopathology 11.1 (1973): 11–24 online.
- Ravallion, Martin (1996), Famines and economics, World Bank, Policy Research Dept., Poverty and Human Resources Division, CiteSeerX 10.1.1.18.1618
- Roseboom, Tessa, Susanne de Rooij, and Rebecca Painter. "The Dutch famine and its long-term consequences for adult health." Early human development 82.8 (2006): 485–491. online
- Sen, Amartya, Poverty and Famines: An Essay on Entitlements and Deprivation, Oxford, Clarendon Press, 1982 via Oxford Press
- Scrimshaw, Nevin S. (1987). Food Protection in the Americas. National Academy Press. Bibcode:1987nap..book18912N.
- Shipton, Parker (1990). "African Famines and Food Security: Anthropological Perspectives". Annual Review of Anthropology. 19: 353–94. doi:10.1146/annurev.an.19.100190.002033.
- Smil, V. (1999). "China's great famine: 40 years later". BMJ. 319 (7225): 1619–1621. doi:10.1136/bmj.319.7225.1619. PMC 1127087. PMID 10600969.
- Sommerville, Keith. Why famine stalks Africa, BBC, 2001
- Srivastava, H.C., The History of Indian Famines from 1858–1918, Sri Ram Mehra and Co., Agra, 1968.
- Vaughan, Megan. The Story of an African Famine: Gender and Famine in Twentieth-Century Malawi (Cambridge University Press, 1987).
- Webb, Patrick. Famine. In Griffiths, M (ed.). Encyclopaedia of International Relations and Global Politics. London: Routledge, 2005, pp. 270–72.
- Wemheuer, Felix. Famine Politics in Maoist China and the Soviet Union (Yale University Press, 2014).
- Wintour, Patrick (21 March 2024). "David Cameron accuses Israel of blocking key aid crossing in Gaza". The Guardian. Archived from the original on 22 March 2024.
- Woo-Cumings, Meredith, "The Political Ecology of Famine: The North Korean Catastrophe and Its Lessons" (PDF). 22 January 2015. Archived from the original (PDF) on 18 March 2006. (807 KB), ADB Institute Research Paper 31, January 2002.
- Zhou, Xun, ed. The Great Famine in China, 1958–1962: A Documentary History (Yale University Press, 2012).
