= Ponta Grossa =

Municipality in Paraná, southern Brazil

- Municipality
- Municipality of Ponta Grossa
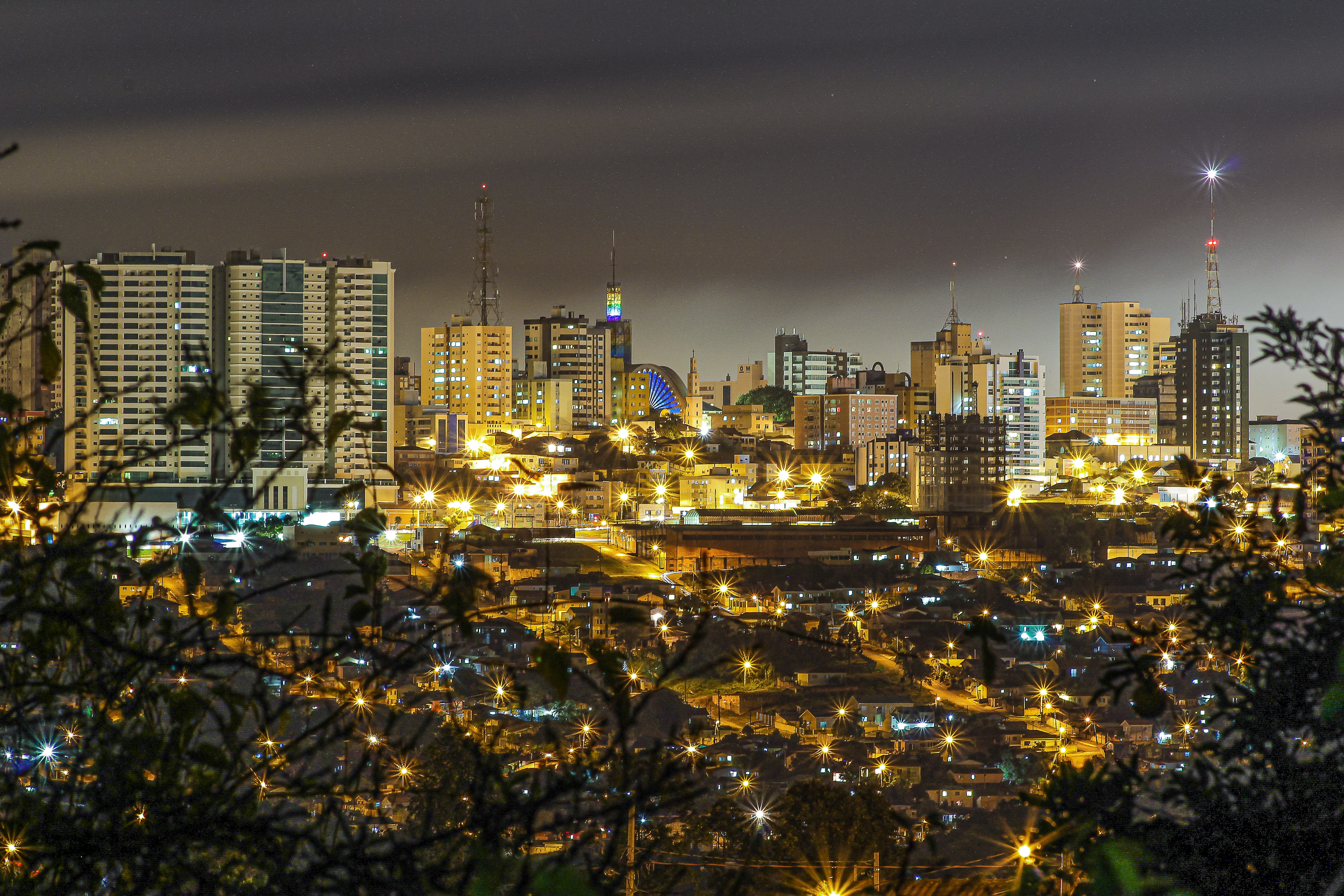
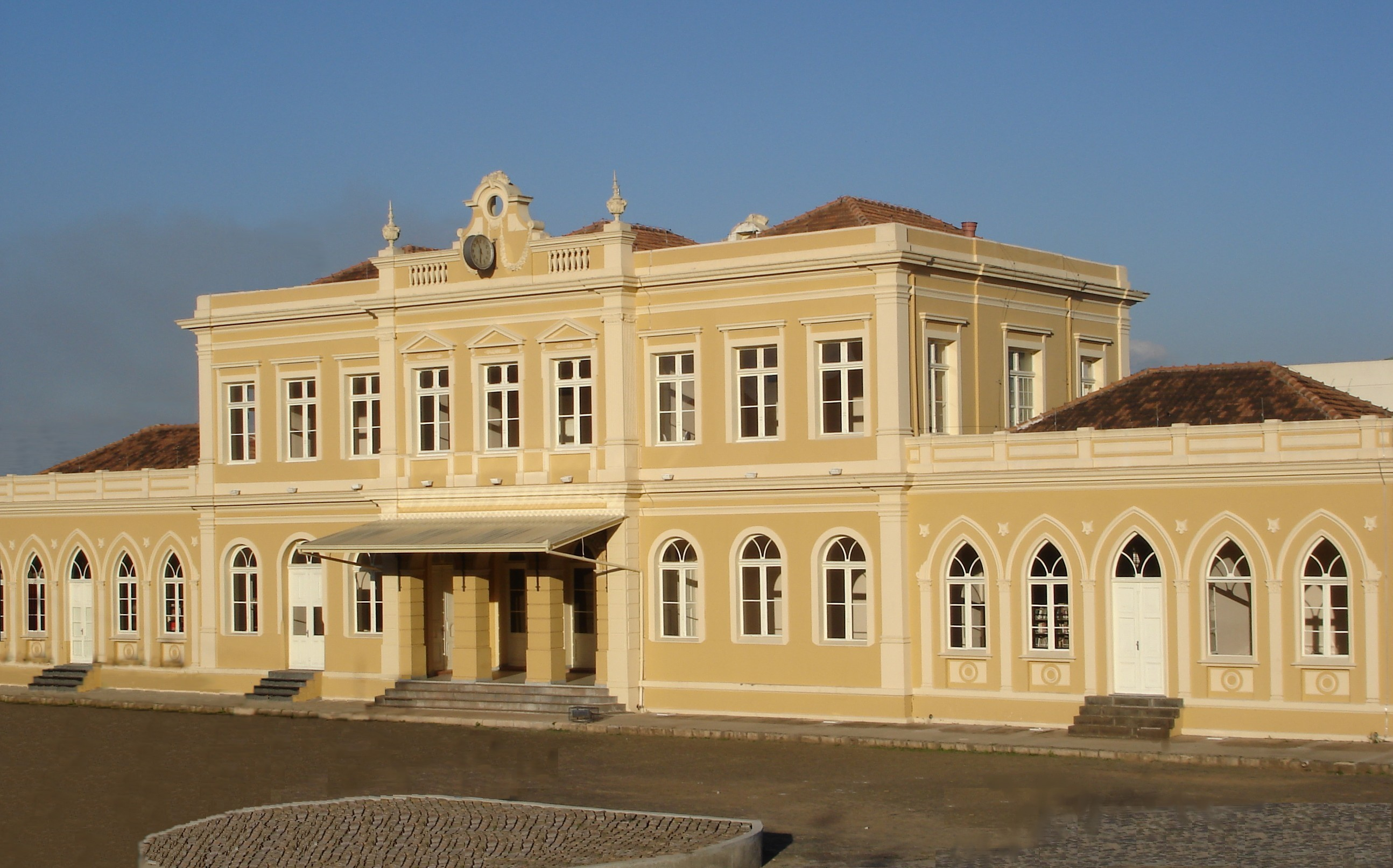
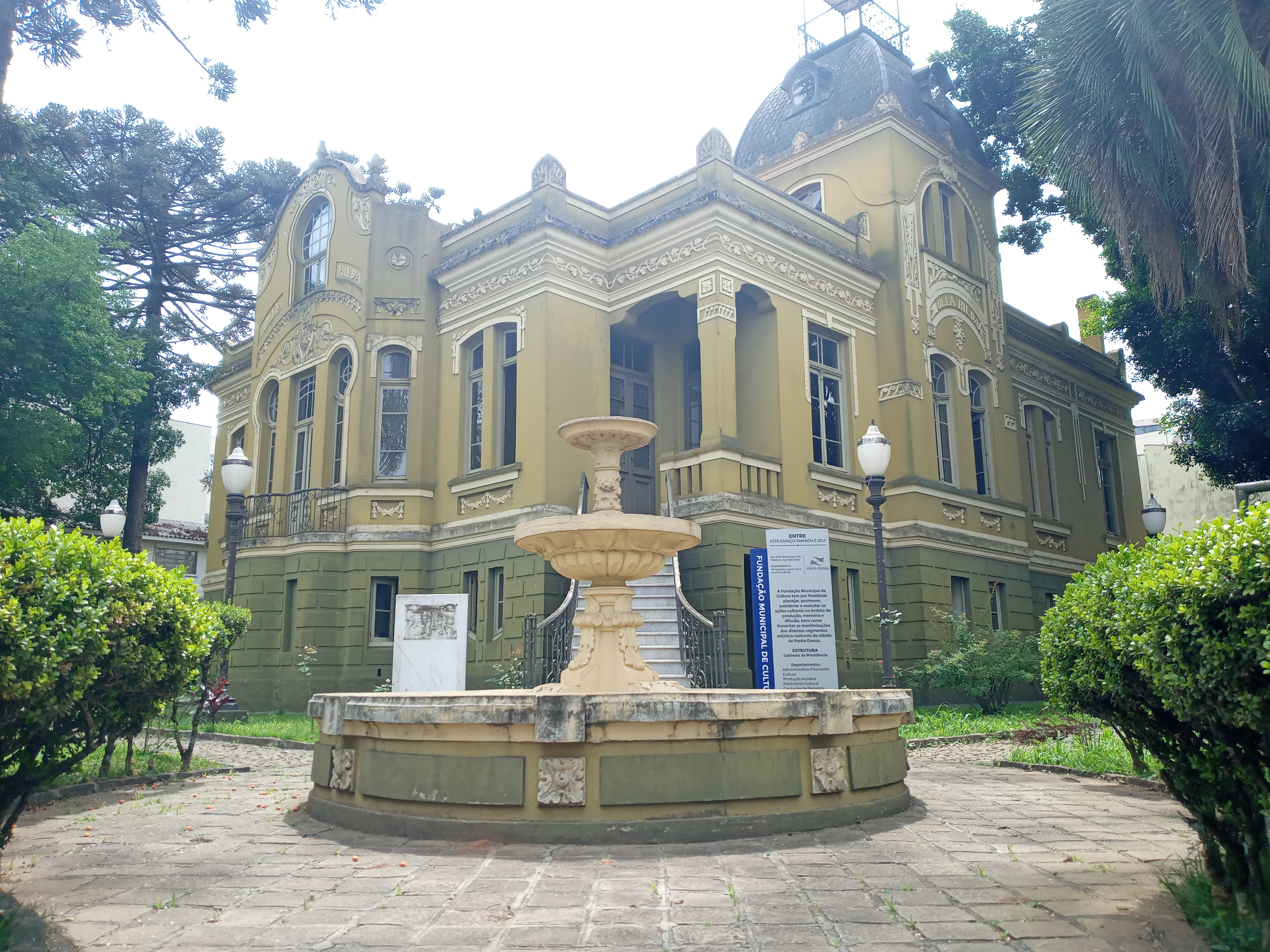
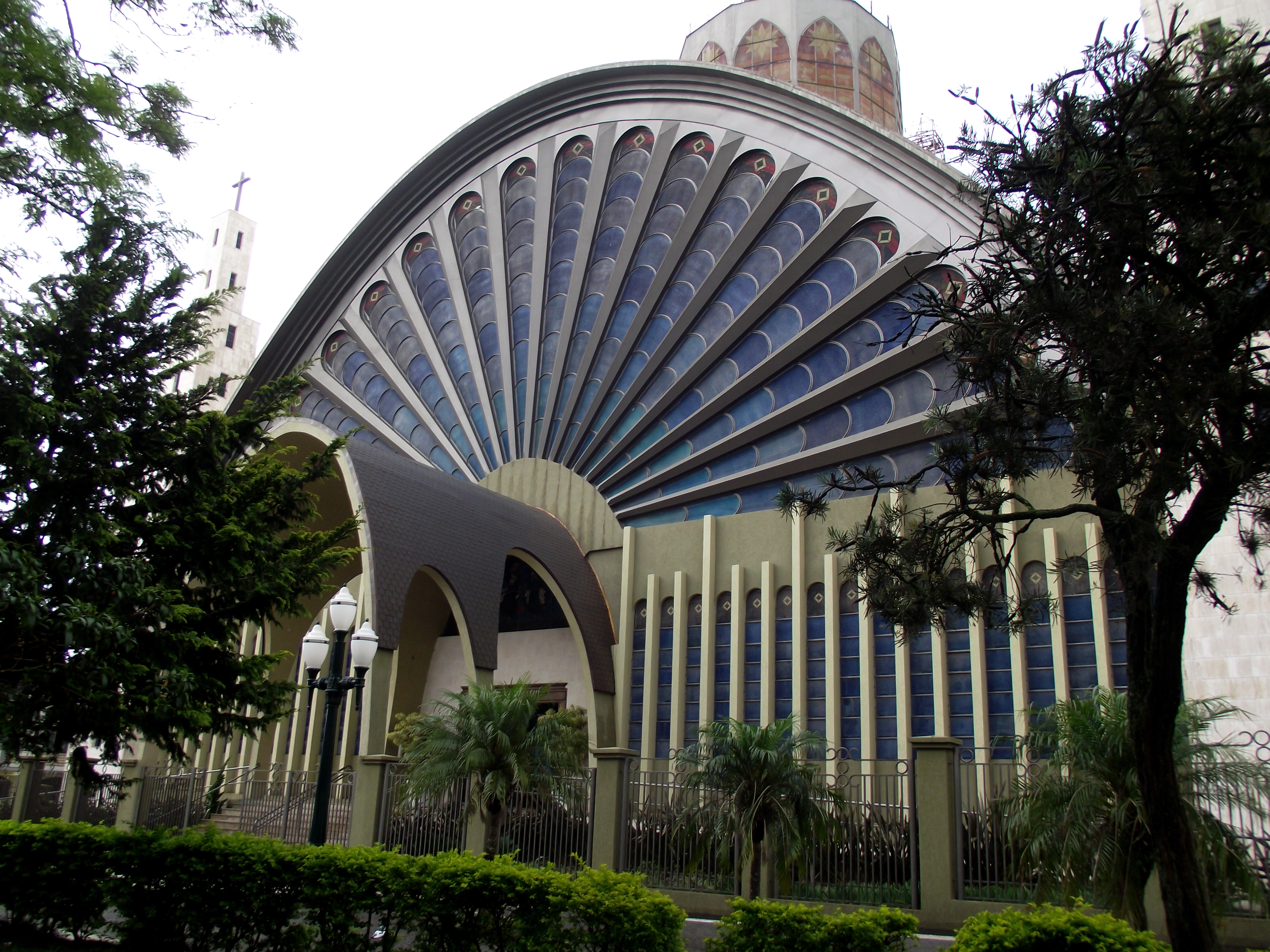
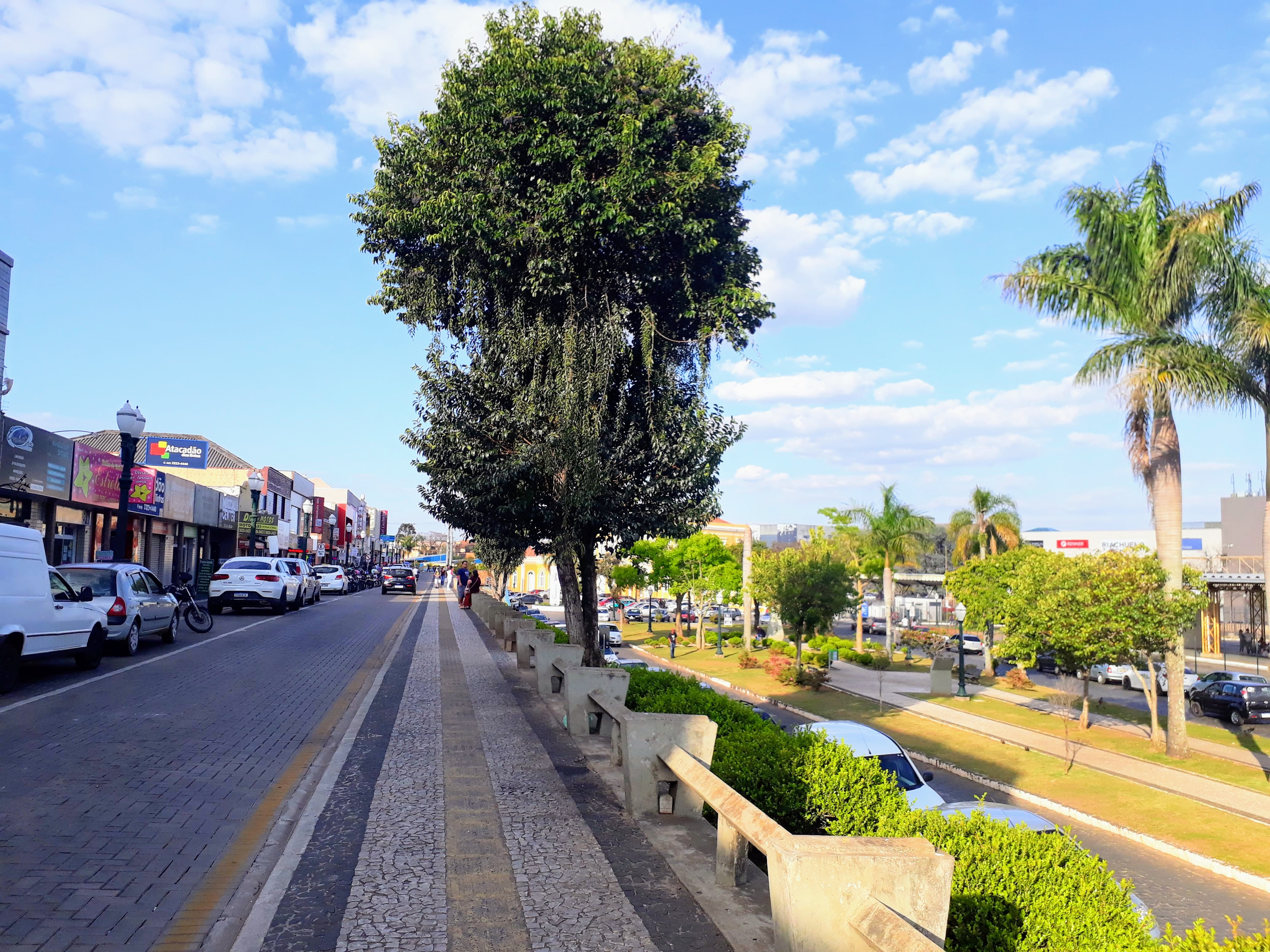
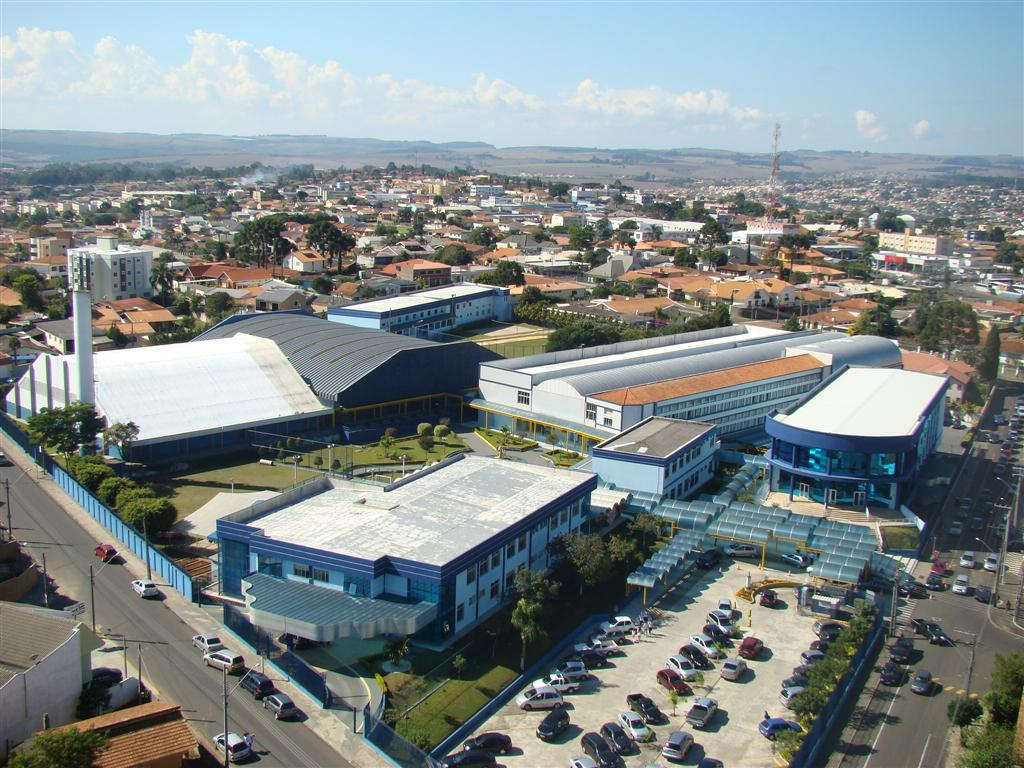

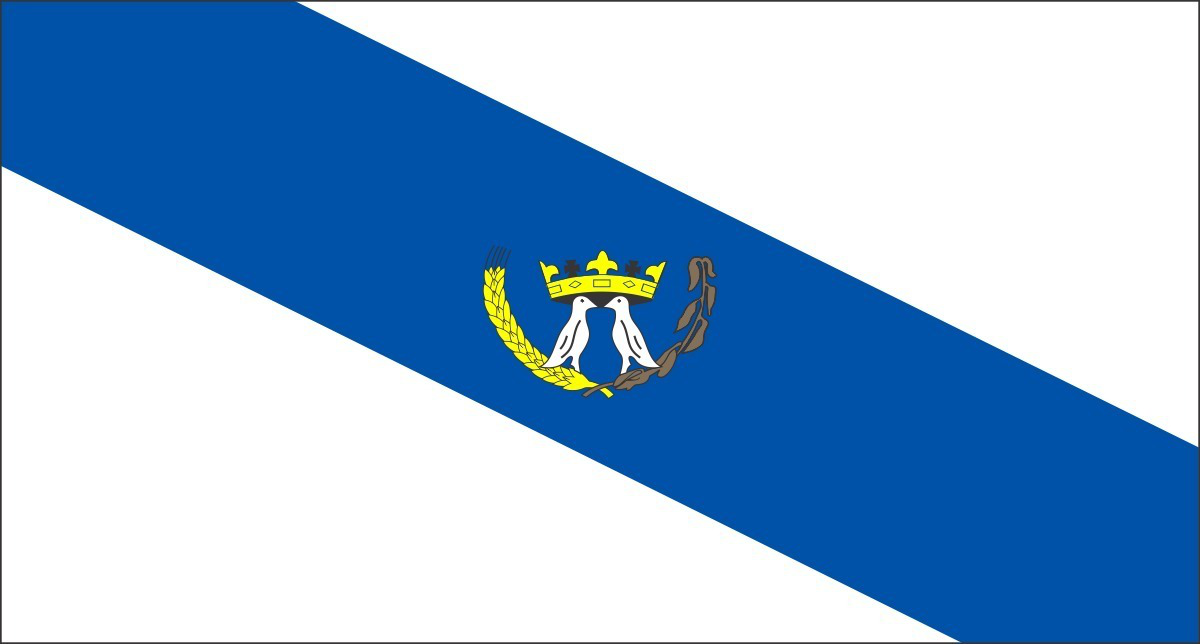
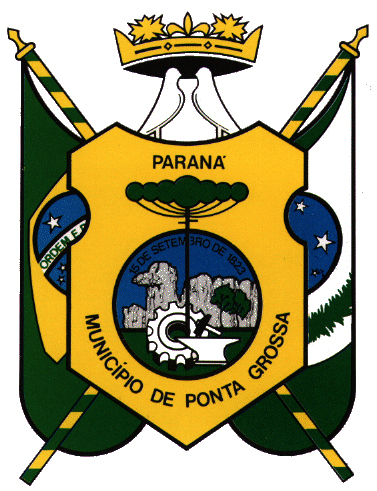
- Flag Coat of arms
- Nicknames: Princesa dos Campos; Capital Cívica do Paraná
- Location in Paraná

- Location in Brazil
- Coordinates: 25°25′S 49°15′W
- Country: Brazil
- Region: South
- State: Paraná
- Settled (town): 15 September 1824
- Incorporated (city): 24 March 1862

Government
  - Type: City hall
  - Mayor: Elizabeth Schmidt (União Brasil)
  - Council: Ponta Grossa City Council

Area
  - Municipality: 2,067.6 km^{2} (798.3 sq mi)
  - Urban: 172.41 km^{2} (66.57 sq mi)
- Elevation: 975 m (3,199 ft)

Population (2022)
  - Municipality: 358,371
  - Estimate (2025): 375,632
  - Rank: 76th, Brazil; 4th, Paraná
  - Density: 150.55/km^{2} (389.9/sq mi)
  - Urban: 304,733
  - Metro: 430,075
- population of the Microregion of Ponta Grossa which covers four towns
- Demonym(s): pontagrossense princesino

GDP
  - Year: 2015 estimate
  - Total: R$11,805,538.69 thousands (7th, Paraná)
  - Per capita: R$34,941.59 (63rd, Paraná)

HDI
  - Year: 2010
  - Category: 0.763 high
- Time zone: UTC−3 (BRT)
- Postalcode (CEP): 84010-000
- Area codes: +55 42
- State Highways: PR-151 and PR-513
- Federal Highway: BR-376
- Municipality Code: 4119905
- Website: www.pontagrossa.pr.gov.br

Ponta Grossa (Portuguese pronunciation: [ˈpõtɐ ˈɡɾɔsɐ]) is a municipality in the state of Paraná, southern Brazil. The estimated population is 355,336 according to official data from the Brazilian Institute of Geography and Statistics and it is the 4th most populous city in Paraná (76th in Brazil). It is also the largest city close to Greater Curitiba region, so within a radius of 186 miles (300 km) of Ponta Grossa.

It is also known as Princesa dos Campos (in English: Princess of the Fields) and Capital Cívica do Paraná (in English: Civic Capital of Paraná). The city is connected to the Caminho das Tropas (in English: Path of the Troops), being one of the network of routes used by drovers (tropeiros) in the middle of a high hill inside a grassy vegetation. The city is considered of average size, located around a central hill, while most of its growth occurred in the second half of the twentieth century with the weakening of the primary economy.

Ponta Grossa is one of the largest tourist destinations in the Paraná, especially because of the area of natural beauty, Vila Velha State Park which is located within the limits of the municipality. The cup of Vila Velha refers to its location in the collective imagination. The München Fest, a party dedicated to German culture and also known as the Festa Nacional do Chopp Escuro (in English: Dark Chopp National Party), is the biggest event in Paraná and usually lasts a week between November and December.

In this city, the industrial sector is fundamental (supported by agriculture). The city hosts the largest concentration of industry in the interior of Paraná. Agroindustry, lumber and metalworking are the major industries. The result is reflected in national GDP with the contribution from this city within the interior of Brazil, being only below Foz do Iguaçu. Municipal GDP increased over the state and national average between 2013 and 2019, this was also seen in the number of registered companies and employees.

== Etymology ==
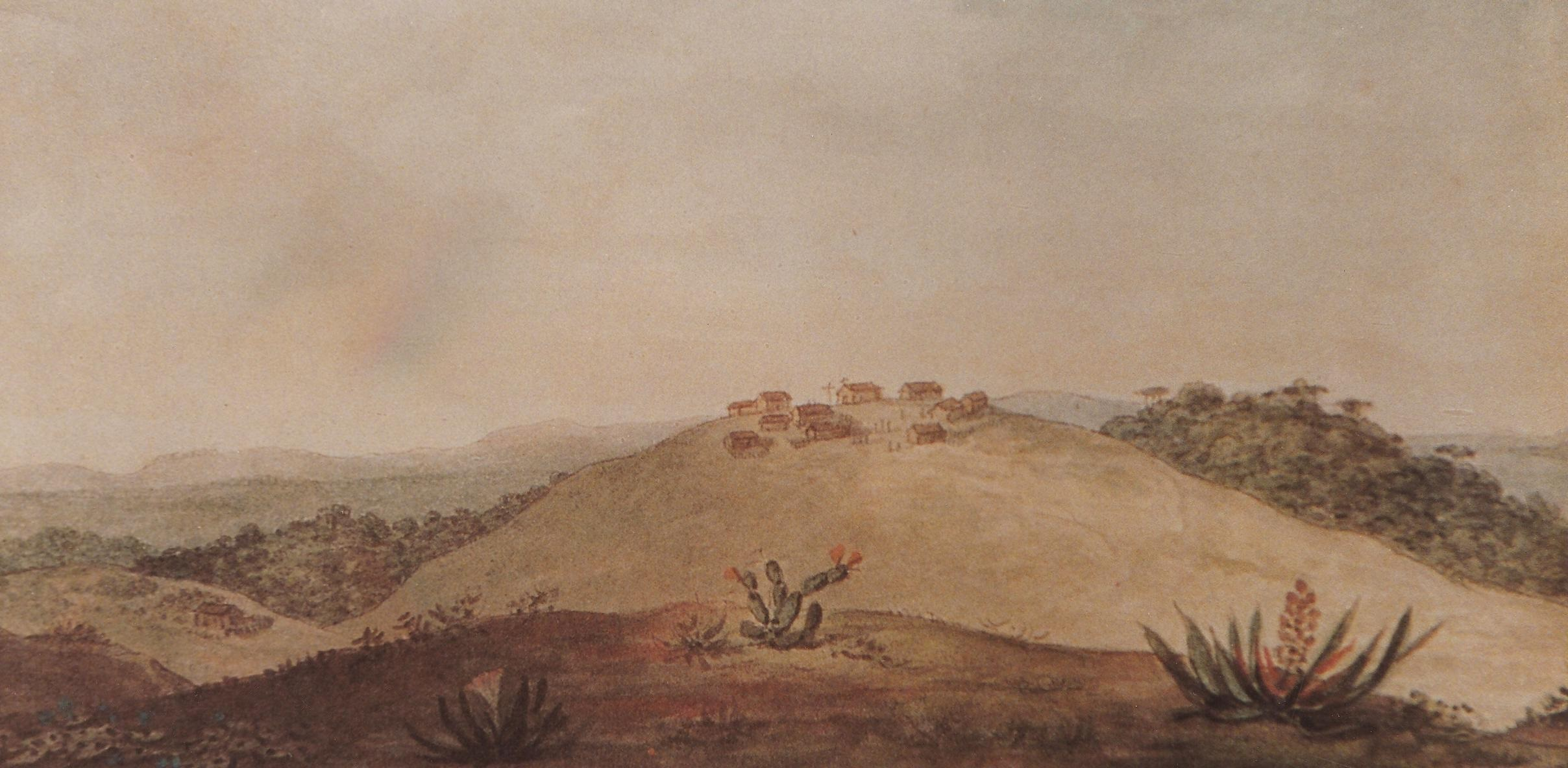
Landscape portrayed by Debret, in the back shows the old village in 1820. It is noted that the referred high hill surrounded by some forest ahead a vast region dominated by fields

The place where it is located has a toponymia related to a hill seen long distance during trips to the Campos Gerais. The name would have originated from a high hill that stood out before the whole pastures landscape by its prominent height and the capo of bush that covers it. The tropeiros to refer to its location said that they were near Ponta Grossa. But other stories have the same idea, like that of the foreman when he tells the farmer the place chosen to establish his farm, "there at Ponta Grossa". Or even that the name had seen later when the owner ceded the lands for settlement.

Ponta Grossa was founded on the farm of Miguel da Rocha Ferreira Carvalhaes who chose it as favorable agricultural land. The farm still exists towards Castro. In 1871 the city came to be called Pitangui, but the following year it resumed its original name. Sometimes it is the target of malicious humor due to what its name can send like in Portuguese. One way or another describes the characteristics of the vegetation and the regional topography.

== History ==
According to the historian Paulo Eduardo Dias de Mello the earliest account of European activity in this area is of the tropeiros who travelled with their wares towards the fair of Sorocaba. Ponta Grossa served as a resting point since 1703 of the long voyages that left Rio Grande do Sul. Along the way was commercialized the charque, where the meat was preserved only with salt. Unlike other settlements, Ponta Grossa was not inhabited, indigenous groups occupied places to the north, with expansion, conflicts later came with European settlers, such as that of the city of Reserva, but outside the urban space of the city in question. Another version, but not necessarily contradictory, states that the farmers of the area would launch a couple of pigeons and where these birds would land would mark the beginning of the Freguesia with the construction of the chapel Mrs. Saint Anne.

=== Colonial Expeditions ===
Ponta Grossa had its territory traversed from the 16th century, when the Campos Gerais were crossed by Spanish expeditions that demanded of the Santa Catarina coast until Asunción, in Paraguay. Later it was successively moved on account of the seiscentistas bandeirantes, notably for capture of the natives. Portuguese bandeirantes like Aleixo Garcia passed in 1525, five years later Peró Lobo and Francisco Chaves. In 1541 passed the Spaniard Álvar Nuñez Cabeza de Vaca who had some conflicts of tribes not too distant. Also, it is reported the passage of a non-Iberian: Ulrich Schmidel, a German mercenary in Spanish service, that during the course of his travels in the region brought 20 Paraguayan natives and four other mercenary German soldiers in Spanish service from the current paulista coast.

Tropeiros, people who used mules and donkeys to transport goods (normally called muleteers in English) used the region as a route, the landscape in the form of a field became welcome to pass with mules and in the future cattle ranching.

At a later point some former tropeiros settled in the area and began to farm. Much of the products from these new farms was used for the feeding of animals used by the muleteers. Other muleteers settled down and started farming because events like floods disrupted the distribution of their goods and so they had to take their losses and began new activities. Preferably, the tropeiros chose to settle near the banks of the Verde and Pitangui River.

These new farmers caused a need for trade which lead to the creation of villages. There were also settlements called freguesias. The later is the word used originally to describe Ponta Grossa and other cities in the region.

The actual possession of the land, for purposes of occupation and colonization, which resulted in the founding of the city of Ponta Grossa, took place from 1800, about a century or more after the area began having regular visits from muleteers.

=== Beginnings of organized settlement ===
When the settlement first began the Campos Gerais were under the jurisdiction of Vila Nova de Castro.

The first settlers who settled here were farmers from the state of São Paulo. They chose this area due to the abundance of natural pastures and the beauty of the Campos Gerais. They settled in the environs of the rivers Verde and Pitangui. Shortly after Benedictines of the Monastery of the Saints obtained grant of these fields, that called Santa Bárbara Farm. However, in 1813, the interim governor of the Province of São Paulo, D. Matheus Abreu Pereira, donated these same lands to the lieutenant Atanagildo Pinto Martins, a bandeirante from Paraná who traveled through and surveyed the way of the Fields of Palms. The Benedictines protested, claiming acquired rights, presenting the Term of concession, but nothing of value was worth the appeals, finishing the immense area in possession of bandeirante Atanagildo.

=== Fixed Settlements ===
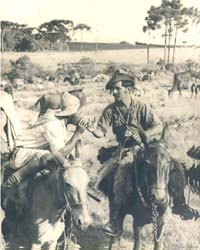
Tropeirismo remained in the early twentieth century.

It was not long before, and he was lord of the Campos Gerais, the Captain-General José Góes e Moraes. Along with Pedro Taques de Almeida (besides others of noble lineage) that required territories between the left bank of the Itarare River and the headwaters of the Tibagi River, they donated part of his lands to the Jesuits who in the vicinity of São Miguel Riverside, a tributary of the Pitangui River, erected the Santa Bárbara do Pitangui Chapel. where they established the Curato of the Company of Jesus that in no time knew extraordinary progress. But the route of the main road was diverted, causing a stagnation of the growth of the city where the first built chapel.

At the same time, the fields were systematically occupied, with the emergence of large cattle ranches.

One important project of this time was the Bom Sucesso Farm. It was established by sergeant-major Miguel da Rocha Ferreira Carvalhães. The farm covered the area that today constitutes the urban perimeter of Ponta Grossa.

Prior to 1750 when the Treaty of Madrid was signed, Ponta Grossa was in theory part of the Spanish Empire, but the Spanish do not seem to have exercised much actual cobtrol in the region. The Santa Bárbara chapel, constructed by Jesuit reductions to the control of the Spanish government was used by oratory by the tropeiros and travelers of Campos Gerais from 1727 by donation of sesmaria of Itaiacoca or the Pitangui. With the abolition of slavery, what did not continue with the catechization and slavery, even with religious groups that came later. Not far from the farm, in the 1970s human bones were found possibly from the slaves of the time.

Where today is the Metropolitan Cathedral, there was a ranch of inn, erected by tropeiros, next to a centenary fig tree, under which they planted a cross. It was there the point of stop of troops and travelers. Another point of reference at this time was the Casa de Telhas (in English: House of Tiles), constructed by the Jesuits for relate with people of the region. In this house were celebrated the offices of the sacrament and religious festivals. In a short time, around the Casa de Telhas appeared the first huts. In addition to serving as Church to hold celebrations was a place of rest. It is believed that the construction of the same was an attempt to press the elevation of Ponta Grossa, until then a neighborhood of Castro to a freguesia. A cemetery and a chapel had also been built. It is he historic moment than the version of the pigeons appears for the choice of place due to divergence between the farmers, described in the sequence.

Domingos Teixeira Lobo, Antonio da Rocha Carvalhães and Benedito Mariano Fernandes Ribas were three early settlers who saw a need to give the settlement a clear legal distinction.

They felt this would solve the difficulties of ecclesiastical matters and civil litigation, since they were under the far off jurisdiction to Vila Nova de Castro. It is reported that Carvalhães would have ordered his foreman, Francisco Mulato, to look for a suitable place in the Boa Vista winter estate to start a new settlement. The place chosen would have been the current suburb of Boa Vista. When fulfilling the mission Francisco Mulato would have said "Sinhô knows well because it is leaning in that capon that has the thick tip".

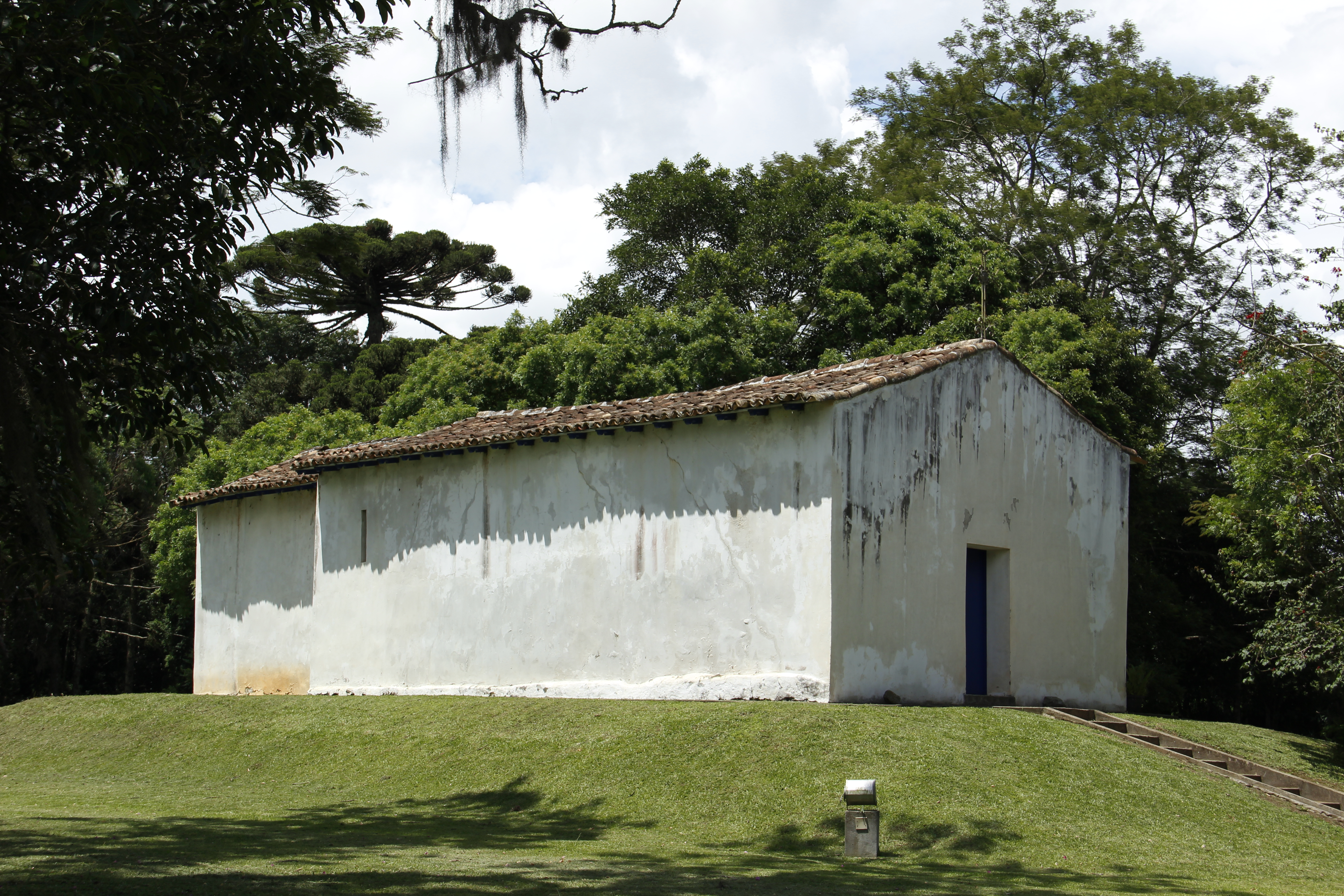
Santa Bárbara Chapel, where the settlement would begin before the change of location

Having approved the name but not the location, the group of farmers decided that the place of the future settlement would be where a white pigeon with a red ribbon bow on the neck, loose in the prairies, would stay overnight. After many flocks, the bird landed exactly on the cross of the ranch of the tropeiros, under the centenary fig tree existing there, having been interpreted as a good omen and predestination, for the effective settlement of Ponta Grossa. A chapel was built with the help of the inhabitants there, being here the central focus of growth of the old village.

Although the above account exists in folklore there are no contemporary documents that support this as the actual origin of the city.

The dove is used as a symbol by the municipal government appearing in the anthem, the flag, the coat of arms and the march. Some sources give the name Estrela, as an early name of Ponta Grossa, "because it could be seen of some leagues of distance, situated in the middle of the fields, on an eminence as the present city is still" (Land of the Future – Nestor Victor).

=== Consolidation ===
It was not until after 1800 that Pinta Grossa became a city. Until then it was an agrarian environment inhabited mainly by subsistence farmers. Criatório (where the cattle are handled) and invernagem (rest period of animals) stimulated trade. So that the farmer "returns" to becomes tropeiro again. Through the agriculture do not effective and as consequence the urbanization process is slow.

On 15 September 1823, through the Imperial license, the Freguesia of Estrela was created. The first vicar of the locality was father Joaquim Pereira da Fonseca. In 1840 the patrimony was increased, by area denominated Rincão of the Round and donated by Domingos Ferreira Pinto. By the Provincial Law nº 34, of 7 April 1855, the municipality of Ponta Grossa was created, with territory split out of the municipality of Castro, being duly installed on 6 December of the same year. The Provincial Law nº 82, of 24 March 1862, elevated the town to the category of city.

On 15 April 1871, through Law 281, it was renamed Pitangui. Very shortly after that it was named Ponta Grossa on 5 April 1872. Ponta Grossa passed the seat of Comarca on 18 April 1876, by Law No. 469, and was installed on 16 December of it, assuming on this date as the first Judge Conrado Ericksen.

In 1878, at the initiative of Augusto Ribas, large scale settlement of ethnic Germans migrating from the Russian Empire Russian-German began in the municipality, two years after the visit of the Emperor Dom Pedro II, main incentive of the immigrations, when he stayed in the residence of Major Domingos Pereira Pinto to whom granted the title of Baron of Guaraúna.

The state government also encouraged through the figure of Lamenha Lins. By the middle of the nineteenth century, altogether 2,300 ethnic Germans from the Russian Empire arrived in the region. This immigration was in part fueled by the arrival of the railroad.

The presence of the railroad also lead to other groups of immigrants coming to the city. This included Slavs, Italians and some people from southwest Asia.

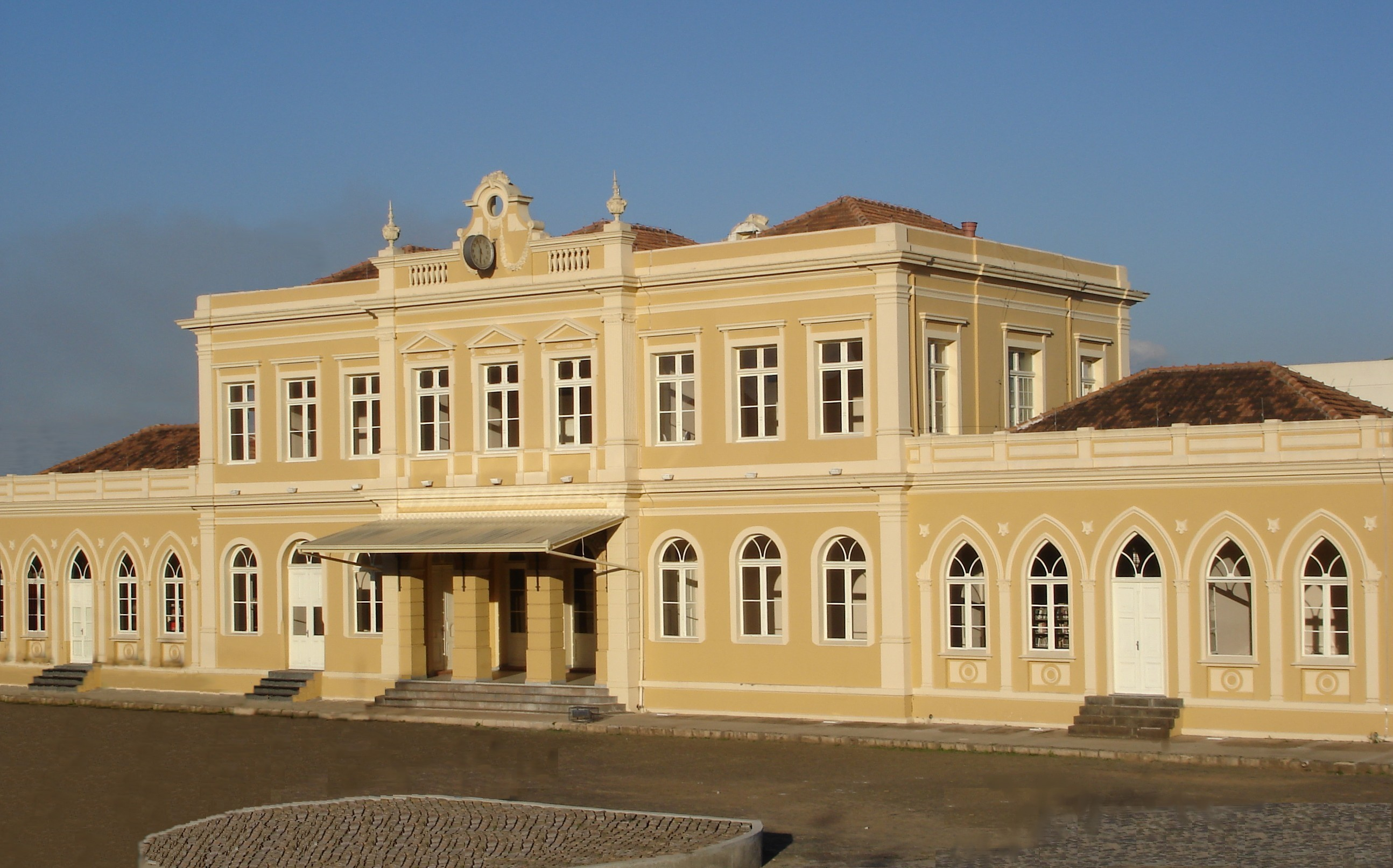
Saudade Railway Station opened in 1900 with neoclassical and art-nouveau architecture.

The city experienced great progress from 2 March 1894, when the Curitiba-Ponta Grossa Railroad was inaugurated (the road facilitated the connection between cities and offered work opportunities), and two years later the construction of the São Paulo-Rio Grande do Sul Railway began. their situation, here have been installed for a long time, the offices and workshops of the railways. Where train maintenance of train. Although some writers consider as something also idealized, the construction of the railroad was important, being Ponta Grossa an entroncamento region. Viewed as city-crossroads due to the construction of highways and roads that gave this geostrategic favoring. The railroad was important for the modernization of the city as well as its growth in the 20th century.

In the early years of the Brazilian Republic, the farmers began to suffer the scarcity of labor, so the main economic source became the yerba mate and wood.

In 1904, when Ernesto Guimarães Villela was mayor, the electric lighting system provided by Guimarães' company Ericksen & Filho was inaugurated and the water and sewage system designed and supervised by engineers Alvaro Souza Martins and Jacob Schamber has implemented it only concluded with funding from the state government by Mayor Teodoro Batista Rosas. The centennial of the foundation was celebrated in the administration of the mayor Brasílio Ribas.

On 17 October 1930, Getúlio Vargas and his troops arrived at the train station, which would remain in the republic for fifteen years. On this occasion Getúlio walked through the city streets alongside Lieutenant-Colonel Galdino Luís Esteves and Aristides Krauser do Canto, being cheered by the population who waved red handkerchiefs and flags, symbols of the revolution. Until the 1950s, Ponta Grossa was the main city in the interior of the state of Paraná, due to the railways, factories processing the yerba mate, leather and wood processing as well as ceramics workshops, among which the production of bricks. This changed when cities were emerging in the north of the state (for example: Londrina and Maringá) attracted by the coffee economy. Even with the prominence that the cities of the north had been obtaining and other cities that appreciated the construction of highways, the axis Ponta Grossa-Curitiba would have been important in the dynamics of the coffee flow. In addition to banking, administrative and commercialization of manufacturing and primary resources. Although it is also affected when there were economic problems in the cultivation of coffee.

The 1970s marked the beginning of Ponta Grossa industrial phase, linking to the grain and food sector. In 1990, it expanded its tertiary sector, in addition to receiving logistic and production companies due to its geographic role. Ponta Grossa was the birthplace of great names of Paraná politics, being known as "Civic Capital of Paraná" (in English: Civic Capital of Paraná).

=== Administrative division ===
On 5 December 1931, it acquires the old municipality of Conchas that happens to be district (Decree nº 2,439). In letters from 1936 and the following year, Itaiacoca appears as another district that on 31 March 1938 was renamed Cerrado (State Decree-Law No. 6,667), returning to the old name on 20 October of the same year (State Decree- Law No. 5773). On 30 December 1943, Conchas became known as Uvaia (State Decree-Law No. 199). On 11 September 1957, the district of Guaragi, an extinct municipality named Entre Rios (State Law No. 3,315), being was incorporated of Palmeira. Piriquitos was the last district to be declared. Created on 13 March 1962 (State Law No. 4,556), leaving it to be a district in the 21st century. Today, in all, they are the previous four, including the headquarters.

== Geography ==
Ponta Grossa is on the Second Plateau Paranaense (also known as Plateau of Ponta Grossa, limited the east through the Escarpa Devoniana), at a latitude of 25º09'S and longitude of 50º16'W, from the capital of Paraná to downtown is 70,8 miles (114 km). The city has 16 neighbourhoods giving the urban area a sum of 17,241 km^{2} (6,657 sq mi). The relief is quite bumpy is found numerous valleys within the urban area. It is considered the main road and rail junction in southern Brazil. It has access to the federal highway BR-376 that connects to the north of the state and gives access to BR-277 that allows access from west to east of the state, including Curitiba and Foz do Iguaçu. The same highway gives access in the south direction to resume the BR-376 allowing to go towards Santa Catarina.

The average salary is 2.7 Brazilian minimum wage, placing it in a satisfactory position in Paraná in relation to other areas. The number of people to be in regular employment is 99,317, almost 1/3 of the population, a little more of this proportion represents the number of workers who receive half of a minimum wage stipulated for the country. The schooling rate is 98.2%. GDP per capita (2015) is R$34,941.59. The HDI is 0.763 for 2010. Infant mortality is 11 occurrences for every thousand births, a high value for state statistics. The treatment of sewage is 81.3% in relation to the pipes connected to the network. It is also characterized by low urban afforestation in relation to most of the paranaenses cities. For a historical and phytogeographic regionalization, the city is located in the Campos Gerais do Paraná (In English: General Fields of the Paraná) the most important of the region. For the IBGE's official regionalization, the city is located in the Central-Eastern region of Paraná. Locating in the meso and microregion homonymous to the name of this urban settlement.

=== Climate ===
Ponta Grossa

Climate chart (precipitation, max. and min. temperature)
J	F	M	A	M	J	J	A	S	O	N	D
182 28 17	185 28 17	148 27 16	99 25 13	76 22 10	125 21 9	77 21 8	63 23 10	124 24 12	155 25 13	119 27 15	165 27 16
- █ Average max. and min. temperatures in °C
- █ Precipitation totals in mm
Imperial conversion
J	F	M	A	M	J	J	A	S	O	N	D
7.2 83 63	7.3 83 63	5.8 81 61	3.9 76 55	3 72 50	4.9 69 48	3 69 47	2.5 73 50	4.9 75 54	6.1 76 56	4.7 80 58	6.5 81 60
- █ Average max. and min. temperatures in °F
- █ Precipitation totals in inches

On the Koppen classification is Cfb, typical of the plateaus of southern Brazil which is usually attributed as subtropical of the highlands with mild or warm summers. Although far from the coast has a strong oceanic influence combined with altitude. The average annual temperature is 63.5 °F (17.5 °C). Winters are cold to their latitude, but are generally mild to be considered temperate as the true ocean climates. The average temperature in the winter (July) is from 56.7 °F (13.7 °C) and in the summer (January) is from 70.5 °F (21.4 °C), a high temperature average relatively low for the location. In the plant hardiness of the USDA the city is in zone 9b in almost your totality, in the same zone that the Central Florida by which it allows the growth of the genus Pinus, among other subtropical species. The various valleys are important to create microclimates with different temperatures and humidity. Heat islands can occur in the Downtown and Santa Paula (besides the urban density is associated too with the predominant direction of slopes).

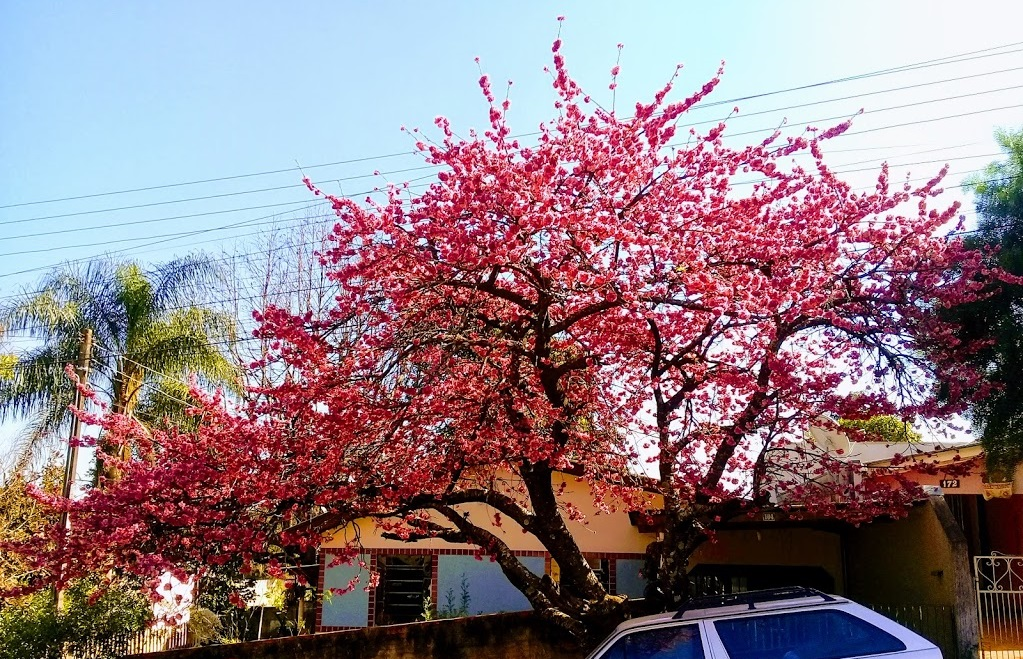
Cherry trees can survive in a subtropical climate, as shown in the example of Ponta Grossa.

According to data from the National Institute of Meteorology (INMET), Brazilian institute, referring to the period from 1961 to 1973 (until 28 February), the lowest temperature recorded in Ponta Grossa was 21.7 °F (−5.7 °C) on 9 June 1967, and the highest reached 94.5 °F (34.7 °C) on 3 November 1968. The largest accumulated precipitation in 24 hours was 5.1' (130.5 mm) on 13 February 1966. Other large accumulations were 4.4' (110.9 mm) on 6 May 1970 and 3.9' (100 mm) on 4 July 1965. The lowest relative humidity was recorded in the afternoon of 9 June 1967, at 14%. Other years recorded were 1975 and 1981. Usually can stay up to 20 years without the occurrence, other times the interval may be 2 years. Frosts are the most common winter event, about 5 annual freezes.

August and July are the driest months due to the cold and dry polar air mass advance. January and February are the most humid due to the humidity that advances from the tropical Atlantic, in addition to the evaporation itself in hot periods generating the short and fast convective rains. However, on average the relative humidity of the air is always high. The number of sunshine hours does not change much during seasons. Tornados and cyclones are rare and there is no history of at least great damage since the beginning of occupation, fortunately. Although there are amateur videos that detected the presence of tornado on 19 December 2010. The fog is a common winter event, which can contribute to the cause of accidents and delayed flights.

Climate data for Ponta Grossa (Vila Velha State Park), elevation 880 m (2,890 ft), (1976–2005 normals, extremes 1954–2005)
Month	Jan	Feb	Mar	Apr	May	Jun	Jul	Aug	Sep	Oct	Nov	Dec	Year
Record high °C (°F)	36.2 (97.2)	33.6 (92.5)	32.6 (90.7)	31.1 (88.0)	29.6 (85.3)	28.0 (82.4)	29.8 (85.6)	31.9 (89.4)	33.2 (91.8)	33.2 (91.8)	35.8 (96.4)	34.4 (93.9)	36.2 (97.2)
Mean daily maximum °C (°F)	27.6 (81.7)	27.4 (81.3)	26.6 (79.9)	24.5 (76.1)	21.6 (70.9)	20.1 (68.2)	20.2 (68.4)	21.6 (70.9)	22.6 (72.7)	24.2 (75.6)	25.9 (78.6)	26.8 (80.2)	24.1 (75.4)
Daily mean °C (°F)	21.3 (70.3)	21.2 (70.2)	20.3 (68.5)	18.2 (64.8)	15.2 (59.4)	13.7 (56.7)	13.7 (56.7)	14.9 (58.8)	16.2 (61.2)	17.8 (64.0)	19.3 (66.7)	20.6 (69.1)	17.7 (63.9)
Mean daily minimum °C (°F)	17.2 (63.0)	17.4 (63.3)	16.4 (61.5)	14.2 (57.6)	10.9 (51.6)	9.3 (48.7)	9.1 (48.4)	10.1 (50.2)	11.7 (53.1)	13.4 (56.1)	14.8 (58.6)	16.2 (61.2)	13.4 (56.1)
Record low °C (°F)	9.0 (48.2)	9.4 (48.9)	4.1 (39.4)	0.0 (32.0)	−3.4 (25.9)	−4.0 (24.8)	−6.0 (21.2)	−5.8 (21.6)	−1.0 (30.2)	1.8 (35.2)	2.7 (36.9)	5.0 (41.0)	−6.0 (21.2)
Average precipitation mm (inches)	194.0 (7.64)	162.2 (6.39)	157.0 (6.18)	104.9 (4.13)	137.6 (5.42)	117.0 (4.61)	111.0 (4.37)	85.4 (3.36)	147.3 (5.80)	162.2 (6.39)	128.8 (5.07)	161.2 (6.35)	1,668.6 (65.71)
Average precipitation days (≥ 1.0 mm)	15	14	13	8	8	8	7	7	10	11	10	13	126
Average relative humidity (%)	78	80	80	79	80	80	77	74	75	76	73	75	77
Mean monthly sunshine hours	178.1	163.5	175.5	177.0	179.9	165.5	191.1	190.8	152.8	173.8	190.9	176.4	2,115
Source 1: Empresa Brasileira de Pesquisa Agropecuária (EMBRAPA)
Source 2: IDR-Paraná (precipitation days and sun 1954–2001)

Climate data for Ponta Grossa (South of Downtown), elevation: 868.5 m or 2849.4 ft, 1961–1990 normals, (Note: Mean monthly maxima and minima (i.e. the expected highest and lowest temperature readings at any point during the year or given month) calculated based on data at said location from 1961 to 1990.) extremes for 1961–1973
Month	Jan	Feb	Mar	Apr	May	Jun	Jul	Aug	Sep	Oct	Nov	Dec	Year
Record high °C (°F)	34.2 (93.6)	34.0 (93.2)	33.7 (92.7)	30.6 (87.1)	30.0 (86.0)	28.0 (82.4)	28.6 (83.5)	31.4 (88.5)	32.8 (91.0)	33.5 (92.3)	34.5 (94.1)	33.9 (93.0)	34.5 (94.1)
Mean daily maximum °C (°F)	28.1 (82.6)	28.1 (82.6)	27.2 (81.0)	24.5 (76.1)	22.4 (72.3)	20.8 (69.4)	20.8 (69.4)	22.7 (72.9)	24.1 (75.4)	24.6 (76.3)	26.6 (79.9)	27.2 (81.0)	24.8 (76.6)
Daily mean °C (°F)	21.5 (70.7)	21.5 (70.7)	20.5 (68.9)	17.5 (63.5)	15.0 (59.0)	13.7 (56.7)	13.4 (56.1)	15.1 (59.2)	17.0 (62.6)	17.9 (64.2)	19.6 (67.3)	20.5 (68.9)	17.8 (64.0)
Mean daily minimum °C (°F)	17.0 (62.6)	17.3 (63.1)	16.1 (61.0)	12.9 (55.2)	9.9 (49.8)	8.9 (48.0)	8.4 (47.1)	9.8 (49.6)	12.0 (53.6)	13.4 (56.1)	14.6 (58.3)	15.8 (60.4)	13.0 (55.4)
Record low °C (°F)	10.4 (50.7)	9.2 (48.6)	6.8 (44.2)	0.1 (32.2)	−2.8 (27.0)	−5.7 (21.7)	−4.2 (24.4)	−3.7 (25.3)	−1.3 (29.7)	3.4 (38.1)	4.6 (40.3)	6.3 (43.3)	−5.7 (21.7)
Average precipitation mm (inches)	181.7 (7.15)	185.2 (7.29)	148.4 (5.84)	99.4 (3.91)	75.9 (2.99)	124.6 (4.91)	77.1 (3.04)	62.8 (2.47)	123.9 (4.88)	154.5 (6.08)	118.5 (4.67)	164.7 (6.48)	1,517.1 (59.73)
Average precipitation days (≥ 1.0 mm (0.04 in))	13	12	11	7	5	7	5	6	9	11	9	12	107
Average snowy days (≥ 0.25 cm (0.1 in))	0	0	0	0	0	0	0.1	0	0	0	0	0	0.1
Average relative humidity (%)	77.3	79.7	79.0	78.5	78.6	79.7	76.4	72.8	73.6	76.2	73.0	75.9	76.7
Mean monthly sunshine hours	197.1	171.7	183.6	190.4	200.5	170.5	196.0	198.1	157.7	167.4	191.9	192.7	2,217.6
Source 1: INMET (temperature, precipitation, relative humidity and sunshine hours)
Source 2: Carvalho Junior (snowy days)

=== Ecology ===
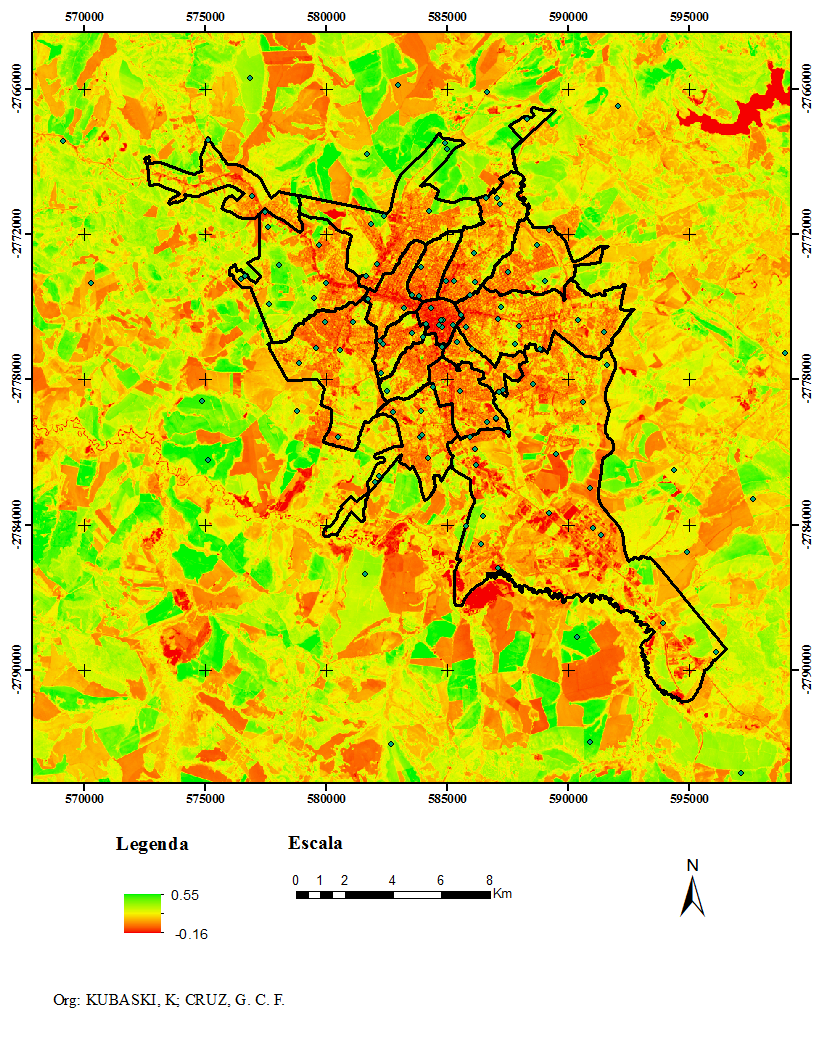
NDVI applied to the urban area during a drought at the end of winter 2017

In ecological terms it is diversified. The composition and species varies according to climatic, pedological and rock formation. The biota differs from region to region. One of the ecosystems found are of field vegetation similar to North American prairies. Tree vegetation is rare, usually dominated by grasses and herbaceous. Sometimes it is interspersed with shrubs. Covering an area of 22,800 ha in 1996. The origin goes back to the own sandstone units found in the urban and rural environment. The trampling of the herds is responsible for the modification of the location and quantity of species that live in these fields. The renovation of the pasture is done by the slash-and-burn, a technique used a long time ago. Other paradigms for the original conservation of the vegetation is the inclusion of some species with seeds, decharacterizing the original phytogeographic region. The backing for affirmative is also indicated for the presence of agroindustries. Part of the lack of conservation is to for consider the fields as a monotonous vegetation without diversity. It usually appears in regions of smaller altimetric oscillations (for example: Furnas Formation in Itaiacoca or in the elevated portions of Uvaia with the Itararé Formation). Or also on poorer soils that do not have a long depth and is sandy, as seen near the Escarpa Devoniana towards the east of the municipality. There are two main types of photole vegetation: dry fields, formed in relatively flat places, usually in lithosols and poor cambisols. Among them are the Colchão Glass and the Forquilha Glass. It usually exists where there is no grazing, like east of the host district. The other subcategory, the dirty fields, has a few shrubs dominated by vassouras and maria-moles (and/or assa-peixes). There is the wet version with species adapted to humidity that arise in depressions.

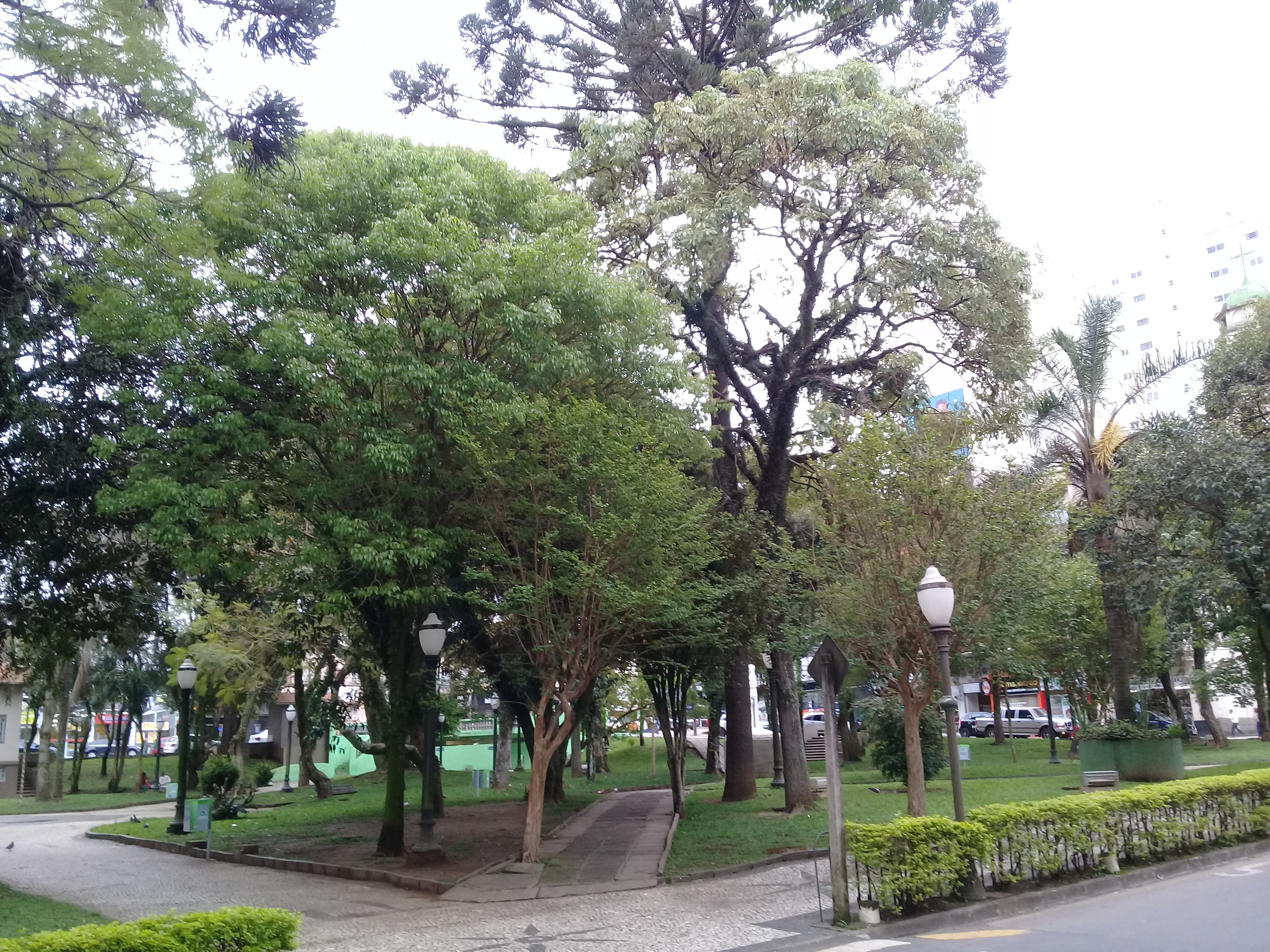
Barão do Rio Branco, central square more vegetated with remnants of Araucaria angustifolia

Native vegetation of Araucaria moist forests is also found, in total there are 23,500 ha, being therefore the largest natural ecosystem found in the area. Until the Pleistocene was dominated a drier climate that assists the presence of fields, however, as the climate began to become wetter at the end of the geological period and so it was advanced appearing mainly near ciliary or gallery forests (such as those found near the Cara-Cará River or Olarias Arroyo and in municipal conservation units such as Boca da Ronda and Chácara Dantas) and around springs and slopes of the escarpment. One of the largest areas of forest is located in the District of Guaragi. It could have expanded more, but delayed by the fires (in some situations generating the tiguera, then capoeira and in its last stage the campo sujo, in English: dirty field, subtype of undergrowth) which was replaced by other phases of fields. Despite the predominance of Araucaria angustifolia, other species of arboreal species are found. However, the symbolic species of Paraná is the one that reached its climax. Among the other species found are imbuia, types of cinnamon, monjoleiro, cedar, guabiroba and bravo pine. Tapexengui, fumo bravo, red scarlet and pau cigarra are found below the canopy. Wildwood was drastically reduced by deforestation as well as by the use of wood until around the 1950s. Such use was replaced by exotic species such as Pinus elliottii. Over time, there was a feedback policy on the amount spent for replanting forests. Although araucarias often appear in the gallery forests in extremely humid areas the tree does not develop, and then emerges xaxins and samambais as found in the Serra do Mar among other species. In the district of Itaiacoca there is an influence of the Atlantic Forest, reducing the amount of native conifer in opposition to the increase of sapopema and imbuia, more similar to that found in the vicinity of the capital of Paraná.

=== Geology and geomorphology ===
The city has a rich geological heritage. It is located on the Paraná Sedimentary Basin (morphostructural unit) of Paleozoic age on the Crystalline Basement presenting metamorphic and igneous rocks. Pre-Cambrian igneous rocks of the Cunhaporanga granitic complex are the exception because do not belong of the sedimentary basin covering a large part of the state. Within the larger structure that models the relief is the morphosculptural unit represented by the Second Planalto modeled by climatic influence to millions of years of similar origins and modeling. The relief is gently undulating (though rugged) exhibiting prominent hills and points. Furnas and ruiniform reliefs are present within its political limit. Rivers like the Tibagi accompany the slope, as posteriorly prescribed, while others, like the Pitangui, cross deep valleys between the steep relief towards the 2nd plateau. To the northeast the altitudes can exceed 1800 meters, places where it finds the greater slopes. Larger elevations are explained due to the passage of the topographic step known as Devonian Escarpament to the east and northeast of Ponta Grossa. Devonian sandstone rocks are the basis of the geological substrate: Furnas and Ponta Grossa, above are carboniferous sandstones of the Itararé Group. Each unit is intercepted by dikes and mesozoic sills as a consequence of the separation grooves of the South American and African Plate, where the breakage began.

The sandstones of the Ponta Grossa and Furnas Formation are in the form of shales (when they touch disintegrate on leaf or layer forms) of siltstone or clay structure. It deposited as a result of the basalts of the Serra Geral Formation. The rivers and sediments flowing downstream from the mineral compound are responsible for Cenozoic deposition.

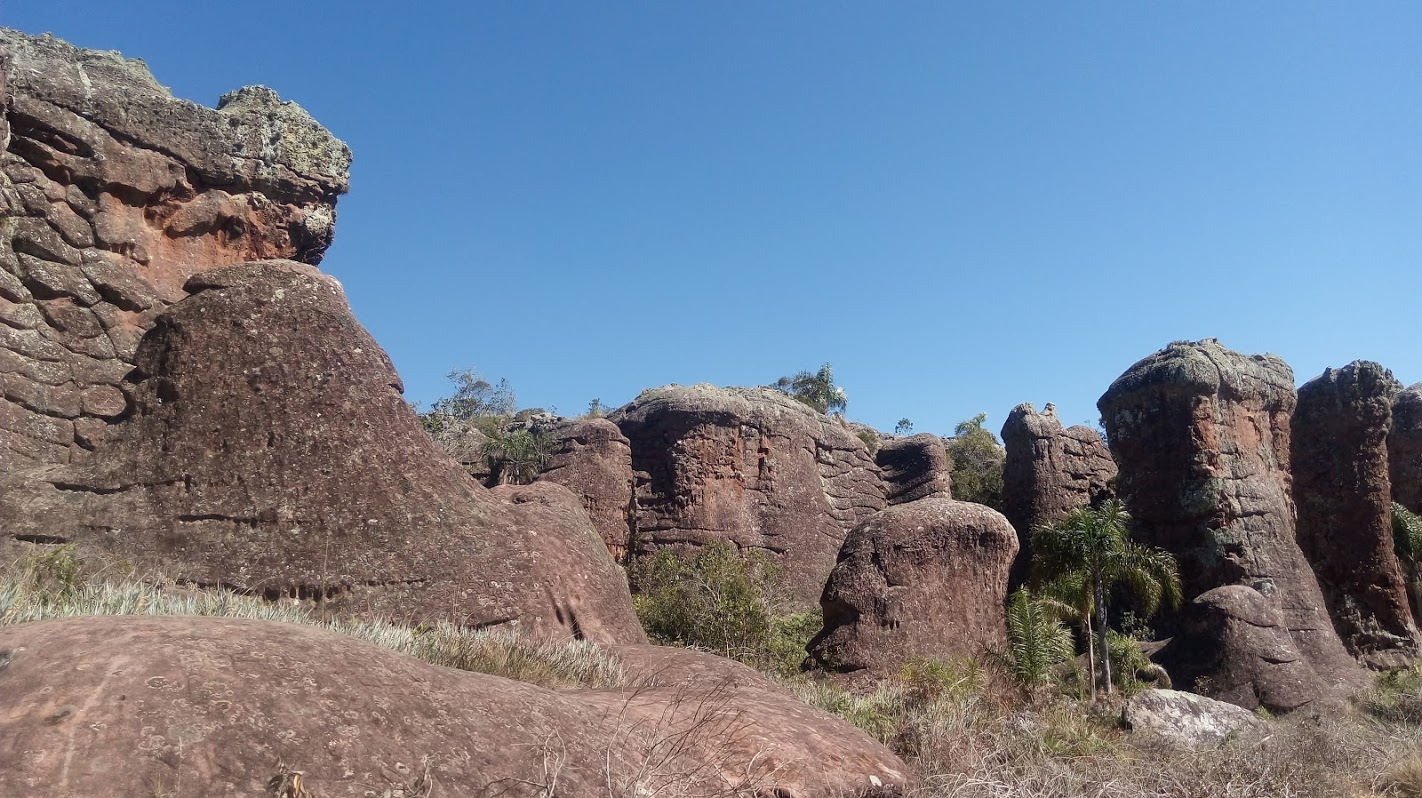
Sandstone of the Vila Velha Park, mystically known as the "City of Lost Stones", remembering an ancient city of ruins

It is famous the sandstone of the Vila Velha Park, an example of ruiniform relief. In geological terms the forms visualized are recent, originated during the gondwana megacontinente, where South America was linked to Africa, Oceania, Antarctica and India. In which the ruins lie in the Carboniferous period was a more southern latitude covered by glaciers. The landscape itself was formed after several burials and erosive processes. Different shapes can be found: flutes, dissolution cones, pointed tops, towers and pillars. Although the popular saying has long ago explained that Vila Velha was originated by the action of the wind, geological research however has been stating that it is the fruit of rainwater, action of the solar energy, changes in temperature and activity of living beings on the rock (in discontinuities and shear zone).

==== Graben ====
Graben of Ponta Grossa is a tectonic fossa with blocks slaughtered of the NE-SW direction (average values: 3 km wide and 10 km long), where the city is located in the greater part of the urban perimeter. Caused by the displacement of rocks, so that the whole block can descend. The spaces in vain are occupied by rocks of the fault, allowing that rocks of the Itararé Group and of the Ponta Grossa Formation, therefore of rocks of very different ages are at the same stratigraphic level. The geological unit of Furnas has a fractured and karstic aquifer where it has been receiving innumerable grants in the last decades for the installation of tubular wells due to water quality. The Itararé Group also has aquifer, although the lower quality is used because it is outcrop, since the Furnas normally be lower. The Ponta Grossa Formation has a good form of water storage but difficult to flow and is usually associated with another two in well records. Being in an urban environment is susceptible of contamination. Other cares refer to the karst relief in Furnas that can cause landslides.

==== Arch of the Ponta Grossa ====
This arch, named after the city, is located on a rise of the Earth's crust on the eastern limit of the Paraná Basin. It arose about 130 million years ago when the South American and African continents were separating. It has an NW-SE direction with NW trim, diabase dikes appear in subparallel bundles near the arch and these same fractures are responsible for the third plateau basalt effluent. In the second plateau but mainly in horizontal fracturing. The topography is also a consequence of the arching, exposing the older rocks at the edges of the sedimentary basin. Several parallel faults, aquifers and magnetic alignments follow the direction of the Arch of the Ponta Grossa. It is believed that the resulting dikes were not formed simultaneously, but over a period of 100 years, and not necessarily all are situated to the northwest. The drainage of some rivers that pass through the city and in the region of Campos Gerais is accompanied by canyons, rocky walls and waterfalls as found in the municipality in the São Jorge River, which demonstrates a morfoestrutural control.

=== Hydrography ===
The main drainage basin that covers Ponta Grossa is the Tibagi River (original indigenous denotation "Tibaji"), tributary of the Paranapanema River in a hierarchy with the Paraná River. Tibagi covers 6.5% of the entire area of the municipality, its tributaries are the Pitangui River which in its margin is subdivided into: Verde, Cará-Cará and Botuquara known in the city. There are no major watercourses on the left bank. The municipality also has the source of the Ribeira River within the Campos Gerais Park in a depression with altitude much smaller than the urban area and it is found in the 1st Planalto (Plateau of Curitiba).

The area is considered well irrigated even if it has relatively small basins outside the Tibagi River that covers the whole region. With the retention of moisture has its rapid displacement to the main water flows. Some of the region's rivers are affected by structural controls. Many times it accompanies faults, fractures and dikes in the direction of the Arch of Ponta Grossa (NW-SE). In addition the route of these rivers accompanies a high altimetric gradient that favors the construction of hydroelectric power plants, so much that some barrages are in functioning as in the Pitangui River. The drainage pattern normally found is radial.

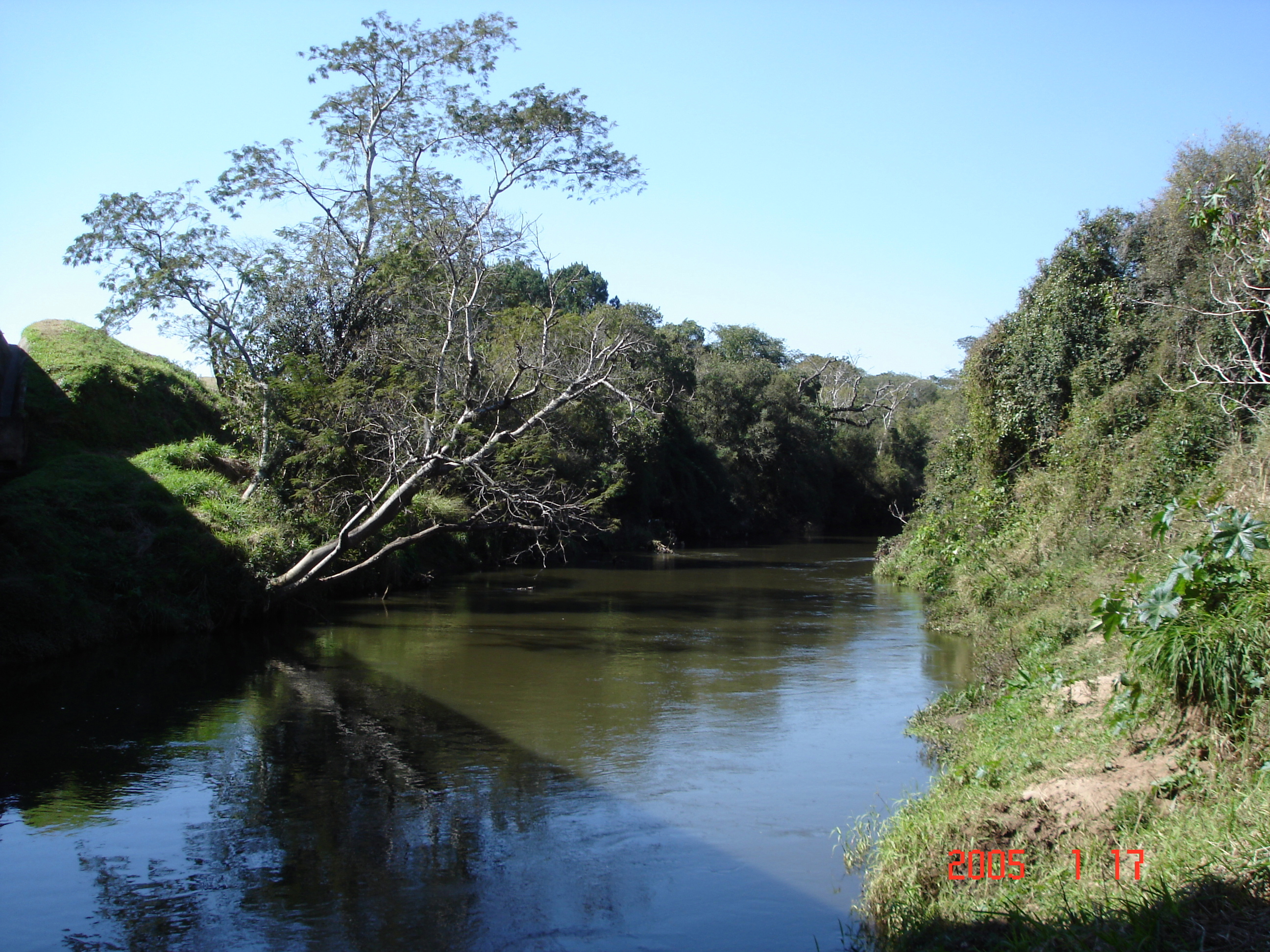
Pitangui River

Pitangui River, one of the most important rivers of the municipality was dammed in 1939 originating the Dam of the Alagados. The same is responsible for the water supply in the city, also by the direct capture of the river. There are, however, problems associated with aggradation and eutrophication. The presence of agriculture, industrial effluents and vehicular traffic instead of the riparian forest affects the chemistry of water with levels of chlorides, phosphors and alkaline.

In all there are 12 drainage basins in the municipality. They are: Ronda, Olarias, Pilão de Pedra, Lajeado Grande, Santa Tereza, Cará-Cará, Francelina, Santa Monica, Grande Arroyo, Taquari, Colônia Adelaide and Gertudes. Of these, there are four streams that are born in the urban perimeter, they were buried and channeled for greater integration of the city. Their historical importance used to be recognized, but today some watercourses are treated as "sewage" by the local population. Others like arroyo de Madureira had bathing status. With rapid urbanization and without efficient public policies, several arroyos, especially in the 1980s, were occupied by irregular housing. By that it aggravated the quality of the municipal air, a singular characteristic before other cities of Paraná.

=== Limits ===
It borders seven municipalities as a whole, although their downtown may be more than 56 miles (90 km) in some cases. To the north are the towns of Castro and Carambeí and Tibagi, to the south are the towns of Palmeira and Teixeira Soares, to the east is the city of Campo Largo, and to the west is Ipiranga.

== Demographics ==
Historical population
Year	Pop.	±%
1824	1,330	—
1835	2,250	+69.2%
1842	3,200	+42.2%
1870	6,490	+102.8%
1890	4,774	−26.4%
1900	8,335	+74.6%
1920	20,171	+142.0%
1940	29,360	+45.6%
1950	42,875	+46.0%
1960	77,803	+81.5%
1970	112,253	+44.3%
1980	171,818	+53.1%
1990	246,738	+43.6%
2000	266,552	+8.0%
2010	311,611	+16.9%
2018*	348,043	+11.7%
2020*	355,336	+2.1%
*population estimate. Source: Sahr, IPARDES and IBGE

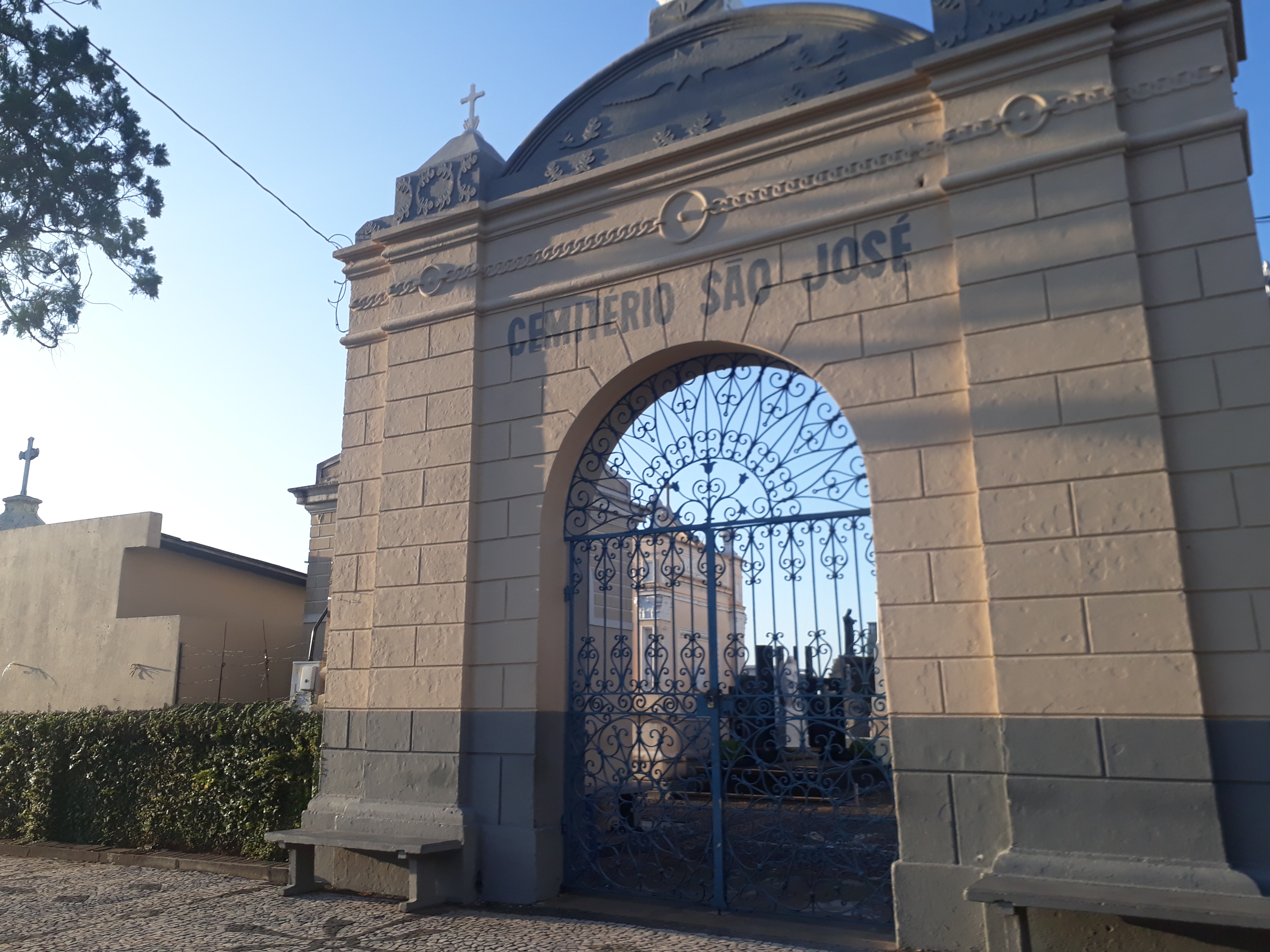
São José Cemetery, where Barão de Guaraúna and Corina Portugal are buried

For the data collected by the census the population in 2010 was 311,611 inhabitants with a density of 150.72 inhabitants/km^{2}, for an estimate of 2018 the value is 348,043 inhabitants of Paraná. For IPARDES the estimate for 2030 is 381,051 inhabitants, a burden of 109.48%, but for this simulation, São José dos Pinhais would surpass Ponta Grossa in population, which would lower the second to the fifth place in the state. Historically its geographical condition was important for the population increase, from the breeding and wintering to the yerba mate and wood and finally the services sector.

Ponta Grossa grew faster in the late 17th century, though Jesuits had settled a century earlier. Used as a breeding ground for the troops of Viamão due to natural pasture, in the freguesia in 1853 there were 3,033 people (1652 men and 1381 women). In 1877 by order of the Empire, this city as well as other of the south of Brazil received immigrants such as: Poles, Germans, Ukrainians, Russians and Italians, generating a cultural broth and increasing population. Demographic growth continued at the end of the same century with the railway under construction. Finalized, it allowed greater interconnection between other regions. In 1890 there were 4,774 inhabitants. Being the population concentrated in rail districts in Uvaranas and Oficinas, accompanying of basic services that were coming up successively. Ponta Grossa lives in a historical context of urbanization seen in the south and southeast of the country. The construction of the railroad was translated in decadence of the tropeirismo.

Several people from other municipalities came to work in Ponta Grossa for the maintenance of the lines. It also marks an advance in the level of schooling, with elite members holding an undergraduate degree in other Brazilian states. It is in 1940 that it becomes the second largest population contingent of Paraná and consequently reference to the interior of the lost state in the following decade. Guaragi, reincorporated in 1957 (annexed by Palmeira in 1940) brought a new demographic balance.

In 1969 with fiscal incentives in the government of Cyro Martins was installed of new industries, which generated a boom of factories. In the 1980s there was an expansion of the urban network, while the railroad is now located in Uvaranas, accompanied by a better infrastructure and then the growth of the urban network and peripheral neighborhoods. In the later decade there were improvements in other sectors. Other districts have predominantly agrarian characteristics, although Guaragi is closer to an urbanized environment. Ponta Grossa became predominantly urban in the 1970s, in which 52.9% of people lived in urbanized areas. A period that also declines in the rural population that went from 28.2% to 20.2% between the 1980s and 1990s, explained by the mechanization of agriculture, where the labor force migrated to the city (until the 1960s it was only increasing). "Princess of fields" reached a rate of urbanization of 97.5% in the start 2000s.

Among the controversial aspects is the intense slump that followed in the last decades of the twentieth century, markedly since 1989 due to rapid urbanization and real estate speculation that generated the "lack" of land (20% were idle). In all, there were 58,730 people living in precarious conditions in 2004. Often residing near urban arroyos sand with buildings in places that should be areas of preservation and inefficient policies for transfer or denial of relocation.

By 2040 the population may reach 460 thousand inhabitants, an increase of 31% in relation to that registered in 2019, 3.4% above the national average and 11% of the predicted state average.

=== Race and Color ===
Racial composition	2010	2000	1991 (Note: The 1990 census was postponed to the following year, the IBGE affirms the lack of employees and the conditions for the realization seemed incomplete (according to news announced by Jornal do Brasil).)
White	78.66%	85.16%	81.28%
Brown (mixed race)	18%	11.57%	16.57%
Afro-Brazilian	2.7%	2.51%	1.64%
Asian Brazilian	0.48%	0.2%	0.37%
Indigenous	0.17%	0.23%	0.07%
Not declared	n/a (Note: There is only one person stated which makes it meaningless in percentage terms.)	0.31%	0.08%

According to the archives of the region (now state) of São Paulo in 1824 there were 75.1% of whites, together with a small share of pardos (4.8%) and free Afro-Brazilians (0.1%), reaching 80%. Historical data of the Sant'Ann Parish exposes 92.52% whites, with only 6.66% of pardos and 0.82% of Afro-Brazilians. The number of natives was not evaluated. For the same year, 76.52% of Afro-Brazilians and 23.48% of pardos were among slaves. But due to the purchase and sale it is possible to change the values. It is from 1832 that in the maps the natives begin to appear, oscillating to less than 1%. Due to the history of European colonization and slavery not so present as in other regions, even in Paraná, the population is predominantly white. The black population declared is smaller than cities with lower population size such as Cascavel, Foz do Iguaçu and São José dos Pinhais. At the same time the number of whites is lower in these cities, but in relation to "Princess of the Fields" is proportional to their fourth place by total number of people.

The indigenous population is larger than Maringá, which has a larger population, and Ponta Grossa is behind only the two largest cities in the state. The yellow population is the smallest in proportion to the number of inhabitants in front of the five largest cities of Paraná, with values closer to cities between 100 thousand and 200 thousand inhabitants, being surpassed by some cities of Paraná, especially in the north of the state. The self-reported white population is higher in the center (91.3%) and the lowest in the south of the city: Cará-Cará (72.6%). The black population has greater expression in Santa Cruz and Sutil, between the limits of Ponta Grossa and Palmeira where they are quilombola refugees, coming from the coast and first plateau.

=== Internal Migration ===
The migration by internal population contingents follows a geographical logic of proximity and flows. The population also underwent changes due to the limit of the municipality that normally went until the Santa Catarina border to the south, since the registries was by the area covered by the parish. It is noticed that between 1823 and 1879 of the residents of Ponta Grossa who live in the same country or had origin in some city of Paraná (305 people or 8.9%) or of São Paulo, in a greater number: 462 people (13.5%) Among the Paraná cities that contributed most to the population increase were Castro (for historical and economic reasons), followed by Campo Largo, Palmeira, Lapa, São José dos Pinhais, Curitiba, Itapetininga, Itapeva and Sorocaba. But it was not just the two states that made up the population of the city. Rio Grande do Sul had its participation in consequence of the tropeirismo, mainly with the cities of the north of the state: Passo Fundo, Vacaria and Cruz Alta. Other cities that have emerged along the Way of Viamão as well as Ponta Grossa also appear in the origin of the resident princesinos like Lages in Santa Catarina (6 men and 4 women). In recent history Ponta Grossa has received interstate migrants between 1990 and 2010, as a consequence of the dynamics of flows to the mesoregion centers, as has also been occurring in other attractive urban areas of the state.

=== Immigration ===
Russians, Germans, Poles and Austrians form the largest group of immigrants of the nineteenth and twentieth centuries. By the civil registry in the Sant'Ana Registry, one of the principal of the city, the largest registry of grooms between 1889 and 1920 are from the previous three, which proves the affirmative. They are 257 Poles, 102 Germans and 64 Austrians, with booms in different decades according to the biggest waves of immigrants. Since 1870, Empire politicians have encouraged European immigration to the country, considering their advanced agricultural techniques and seeking to fill areas. Although inhabited, were often surrounded by forests and depopulated regions such as the case of Paraná. Other reasons were the lack of the basic foodstuffs. Most of the population was focused on yerba mate production and there were no more slaves for free labor. Immigrants were brought in with the ideal of being French-style "progress" for the city, based on other large urban centers. Russian-Germans of the banks of the Volga River were added in 1878, 2831 settlers that lived in Octavio Colony, the first in the city (divided locally in 17 nuclei), that moved towards the richer grounds due to the failed harvest, as an alternative the labor was sought in the production of coal by pine knot, this time occupied by Europeans of the center-south of the continent: Germans, Italians and Poles.

The most famous Teuta-Brazilian was Henrique Thielen, reimmigrated back to Brazil and who was the director of the Antarctica Brewery. Or the Italian Eugenio Bocchi, a businessman from a soap factory from Curitiba who lived in the city. During the same period Dom Pedro II was in the city and heard the complaints, especially on the ground poor between the east and northeast of the municipality. Taquari and Moema had the best conditions. And the Adelaide Colony stood out for the transport of mate taken by wagons to Curitiba. Colonies of Guarauna, Guarauninha, Taquary, Rio Verde, Eurydice, Trindade, Dona Adelaide, Botuquara, Tavares Bastos, Floresta, Itaiacoca, Moema and Tibagi together with the Octavio Colony, 975 people are added to the balance of municipality and adjacencies.

Between 1885 and 1886 an immigration society was created in Ponta Grossa. It was the responsibility of the federal government to create propaganda to "force" the migrations, and also the construction of the railroad. Still on the railroad was important for the solidification of the city and especially the commerce. In the last decade of century XIX marks the arrival of the Syrians. They provided workers to the road and were known for the production of farm and haberdashery. Neighborhood such as Uvaranas, Dona Luiza and Ronda were formed by immigrants. Usually associated with some specific technical work or service, thus forming the local workforce. Jews and Greeks as too Syrians-Lebaneses were important to local commerce. Other ethnic groups include arabs that reflect in the gastronomy. Independently of the origin, a large part of the immigrants had importance for the economic base of Ponta Grossa, several commercial establishments and services were created, from tailoring to butchers and same industrial activities. Emerging, therefore, as social actors of the city. In coexistence with different social classes and ethnicities.

==== Germans ====
The choice of Ponta Grossa, among other South-Brazilian cities was due to bioclimatic conditions more similar to the Low Volga, not far from the Caspian Sea. When they got the settlements, they established a long street (Strassendorf) occupied on both banks. Among the German immigrants, some re-emigrated from the Dona Francisca Colony (from 1875 in the present city of Joinville). Jens Jansen came riding from Curitiba to Ponta Grossa establishing in the farm of Jose Miró, in 1877 he lived in Colônia Moema, time that came a leads directly to the city. Many families were adapting to different places, like some that came from Santa Catarina. But the settlement itself was between 1877 and 1879 mainly. Some colonies were separated due to the religious aspect, Tavares Bastos, for example was Catholic different from other groups of Lutheran tradition. It is believed that the cost of housing an immigrant was 60 milreis. The assistance of Alfredo Heinsler to the Volga Germans is remarkable. In 1927 he and the immigrants celebrate the centennial of immigration. Besides the Otavio Colony, the oldest settlement of the Volga Germans, there were other immigrant villages such as the Euridice Colony in the Chapada Neighborhood where there is the house of August Jansen, one of these immigrants from the period with his name indicated in his house.

Among other colonies were formed, subdivided of the oldest colony such as: Moema, Tavares Bastos, Conchas/Uvaia and Dona Luiza. Guarauna was one of the largest with 322 settlements, followed by Adelaide (142) and Tavares Bastos (112). Family farming and livestock were base. This as well as other colonies did not obtain success with the planting of wheat that had been replaced by other cereals. Trade was also practiced, usually located in areas that were not typically agrarian, but in transition to urban. Many of them moved to the city end of the same century. The ability of woodworking by these immigrants is recognized. Due to failure, there were only 323 families left in Brazil Republic, out of 615. They were usually seen as persistent because they tried to get their crops to succeed. Dom Pedro II was during the repercussion on the poor soils of the Campos Gerais.

Volga Germans were encouraged not to lose their customs of their ethnic origin by which they were replicated in written publications. In 1917 were registered in Ponta Grossa 84 Germans, is the second largest German community, being behind only of Curitiba. In the following year it is surpassed by Guarapuava, remaining in the third place with 29 new registered immigrants, adding between 1917 and 1918 to the whole 9.7% of the police record of Paraná.

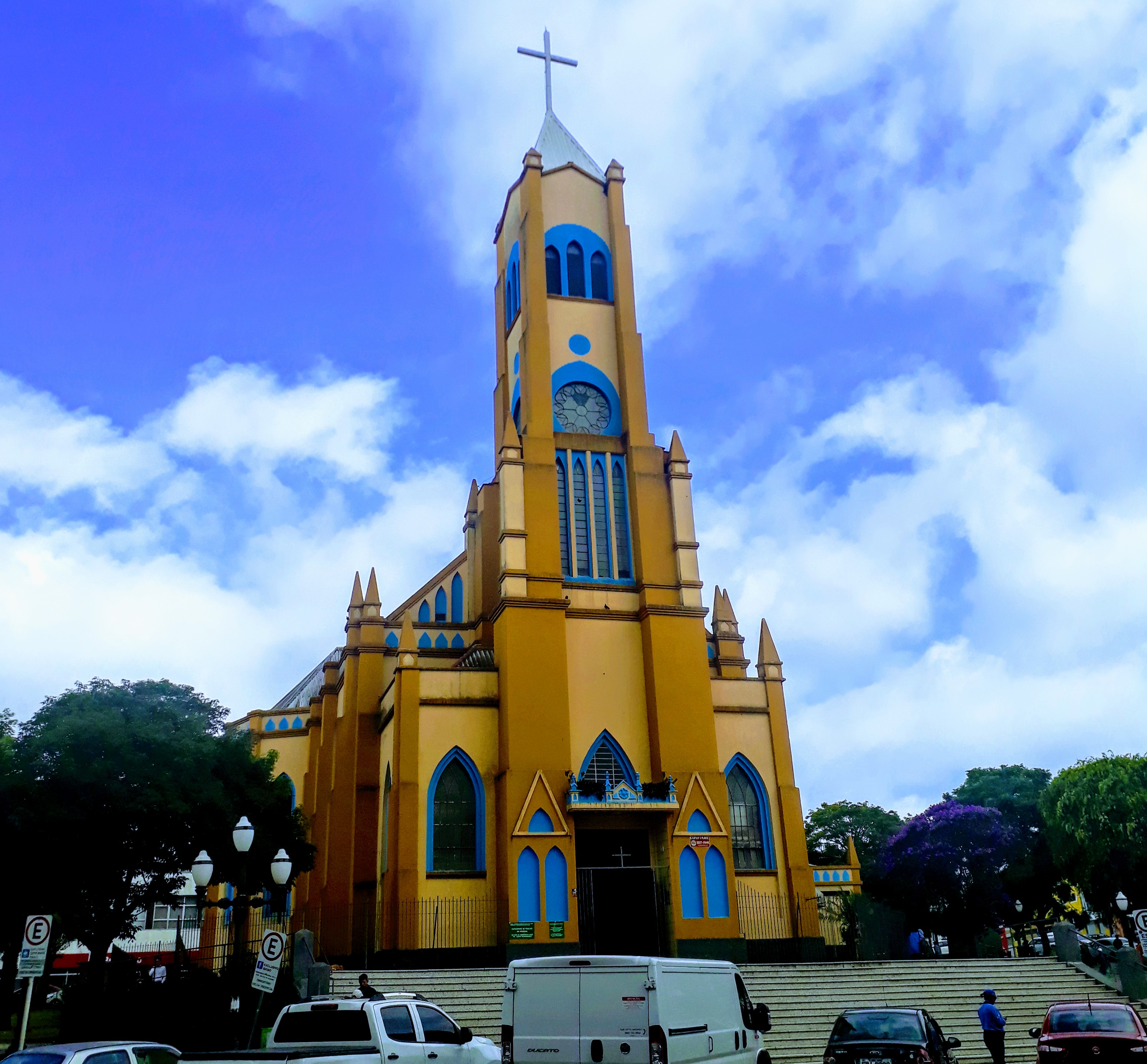
Polish Church (in Portuguese: "Igreja dos Polacos") built in 1898, as the number of immigrants grew. In 1928 another was built in the Gothic style.

==== Poles ====
The Poles settled in 1878 in the settlement called Colony Moema abandoned by the Germans who complained of the dry fields due to their low fertility. With about 26 families (84 people) coming from Tarnnow, southern Poland who were waiting somewhere in the metropolitan area of Curitiba, being the first of the ethnic group. In January 1891, a new group of Poles arrived, distributed in more colonies and, consequently, in a larger number of people: Colony of Taquari (125), Guarauna (140), Rio Verde (78), Butuquara (73), Itaiacoca (46) and Euridice (23), in the municipality of Ponta Grossa. In Conchas, today annexed to the municipality went to Adelaide (99) and Floresta (29). At 6.2 miles (10 km) from the center, the Guaraúna and Taquari Colonies are the largest immigrants in quantity. Some colonies had no planning and were built of wattle and daub, covered with straw and wood, in the condition of poverty they tried to go until the "ranchões" (place that the immigrants are situated to wait their constructed houses). As the heritage of the Poles there is the Sacred Heart Church of Jesus, the lambrequins seen near the rooftops and the Polish Renaissance Society (a dance club built in 1934). The club served for many years as a meeting place for descendants of Poles, to build it there was a need for many people. Gary Dvoreck, the then president of the Polish Society, was against the tipping of the Renaissance Club in 2012. He believes that after being overthrown it would not be possible to make reforms. In 2017 Polish club was at risk of demolition (by which it was denied) and thus came the disclosure of reforms. The Campos Gerais Museum exhibited in 2012 the traditions, the dances folklores, the elements of the first immigrants as well as the Polish architecture. Also the typical costumes pisanki, wycinanki and lepianka, there were a version of Matryoshka, the Christmas wafer: oplatek and Christmas tree, one of the first versions of the ornament. Periods were a form of socialization of the Polish community in Brazil. In Ponta Grossa there was the Sowirzdrzal w Paranie ("The pesky ones in Paraná").

=== Population pyramid ===
Population pyramid 2010
%	Males	Age	Females	%
0.1		85+		0.4
0.3		80–84		0.5
0.5		75–79		0.8
0.8		70–74		1.1
1.1		65–69		1.4
1.6		60–64		1.9
2.1		55–59		2.4
2.6		50–54		2.9
3.0		45–49		3.4
3.3		40–44		3.6
3.6		35–39		3.8
4.0		30–34		4.2
4.2		25–29		4.2
4.4		20–24		4.3
4.6		15–19		4.5
4.6		10–14		4.5
4.0		5–9		4.0
3.8		0–4		3.7

Ponta Grossa, as well as the southern half of Brazil, live a demographic transition period, where the largest population is no longer in the children's zone, but has not yet reached the highest peaks in adulthood, a trend of the future. The number of elderly people has been increasing, although in larger proportion in the Female sex. The population over 65 years of age reaches 21416 (2010, 6.87% of aging index). Currently, considering the 2010 census, the largest age group is between 15 and 24 years old, therefore a predominance among adolescents and young people, giving the population pyramid a "beahive" shape rather than the previous pyramid shape of the previous two decades. There are other phases of higher growth in relation to age bands before or after them, such as 5–9 years (before) and 10–14 years (after). However, the number of inhabitants 80 and older is not so different as the number of 1-year-olds (4109 vs 4376). Over 30 years old there is predominance of female gender, an opposite situation in the infantile-juvenile phase, where the male sex loses only at the age of 7 years. In a total balance, women predominate (51.43%) with 160249 residents of the sex, a proportion similar to 1991. Men corresponded to a figure of 9,000 below the total number of women, altogether 151362 (48.57%). In the last decade the ratio of adolescents' dependence on the financial issue has reduced to less than half, in 1991 it was 60%.

=== Religion ===
Religion in Ponta Grossa (2010 census)
Religion	Percent(%)
Christian	91.9%
No religion	3.7%
Spiritism	2.4%
Multiple or another	0.7%

As the main colonizers were Iberians and descendants of other regions of Brazil during the first settlements and emergence of farms, the main religion is the Roman Catholic Church. In turn it reflects even in the mode of establishment of the city (settlement linked to the location of the parish and patrons of Catholicism). And it interrelated with the history of the "Princess of the Fields", as the Santa Barbara Chapel founded by Spanish Jesuits is the oldest of the Campos Gerais, founded in the eighteenth century. Even the decree was in devotion to St. Anne. Known as the grandmother of Jesus in the Catholic tradition the same is the patroness of Ponta Grossa and by the strong influence of religion on 26 July is municipal holiday. The construction of the chapel was in 1823 in a former shelter of tropeiros that marks the beginning of the village. Other buildings that are also part of the religious patrimony are the Immaculate Conception Church ("the little church of Uvaranas") and the Sacred Heart of Jesus Church ("the church of the Poles"). Religious festivals take place annually as Feast of the Divine Holy Spirit and of the Lady Saint Anne. The city houses the Resurrection Monastery and a monument dedicated to the bible. On 16 December 1929 the Diocese of Ponta Grossa was created. Cardinal Henrique Gasparri took possession of the diocese on 23 February 1930. Bishop Antônio Mazzarotto built spaces that provided for the formation of religious as seminaries and congregations of religious sisters. Since 5 September 2003, bishop Sergio Arthur Braschi is the bishop of the Diocese of Ponta Grossa.

For the 2010 census, 209,678 people identify themselves as Roman Catholics (67.29%). The second largest in number is the Evangelical Church in general with 74842 followers (24.02%). Among the religious minorities with more than 1,000 believers are Spiritism (2.35%), Church of Jesus Christ of Latter-day Saints (0.89%), Jehovah's Witnesses (0.48%) and other Christian religions summed up (0.47%). Hundreds of people follow Buddhism (0.10%), Umbanda (0.04%), Esotericism (0.06%), Catholic Churches that do not obey the papal hierarchy (0.14%) and new Eastern religions as a whole (0.04%). Other religious groups are usually isolated in proportional numbers of families as if they were from the same kinship or few expressive in percentage terms. The number of people without religion is greater than the number of believers of the major non-Christian religions in the municipality. They are 11422 who declare that they have no affiliation with an institution of any creed (3.67%), although only slightly more than a tenth identify themselves as either an atheist (0.29%) or an agnostic (0.06%). People like more than one religion reach 0.32% and do not know 0.04%. Religions that are generally classified as Christian add up to 286,414 people or 91.91% of the city's population. Adding a value of 4.41% for other religions.

There have been events to bring Christian religions closer together like the Semana de Oração pela Unidade Cristã (in English: Week of Prayer for Christian Unity). A project of ecumenical reconciliation, involving biblical symbols between institutions. The diocese of the municipality studies reactivating the hermitage, seen prominently for people who pass through the BR-376 and see the Vila Velha Park and see the structure in the shape of an elongated cone. It became a shrine on 25 July 1983 designed by Bishop Geraldo Pellanda. The same falls within a religious tourism project. Periodic celebrations should be held as well as gatherings, retreats and events. However, it was passed to the technical analysis of the responsible environmental agency in the state. During the first week of October 2018, it was authorized the reform of the hermitage with a budget of 300 thousand reais (77800 dollars (Note: The exchange rate and conversion of Brazilian Reais (BRL) to US dollars (USD) is valid for 6 October 2018. Being 1 BRL equivalent to 0.259333 USD.)) and it is very likely to reopen in 2019 for religious tourism with the support of the local tourism foundation. The sanctuary emerged in the late 1970s.

== Economy ==
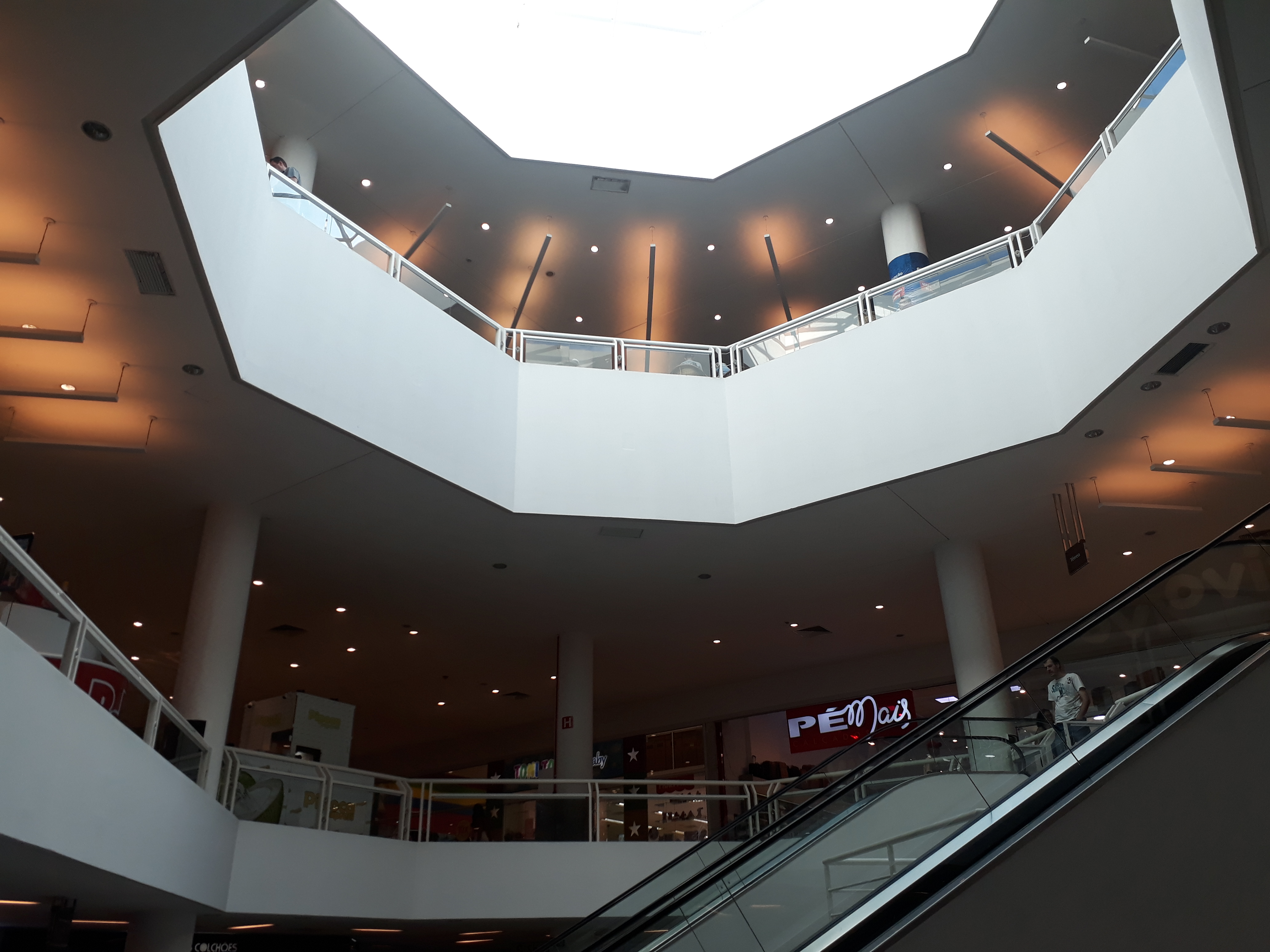
Interior of the Palladium Shopping Mall, Ponta Grossa's main shopping center

It is one of the major economic forces in the state of Parana. The economy of Ponta Grossa has always been linked to agriculture. It was in the last decade of the nineteenth century that there was a jump in the then small town. It is the time of the inauguration of the railway. Products such as yerba mate, soybeans, wood and cereals that were cultivated in this place are now processed in the municipality, entering the first wave of industrialization. The installation of logistics companies and shopping centers such as Palladium Shopping Center further strengthened the economy, especially in terms of trade. In terms of GDP per Capita, it is in 63rd place with 34,941.59 reais, which shows the social inequality in relation to other cities of economic port such as Araucária and São José dos Pinhais. Even so, the value is close to Belo Horizonte, which may indicate that the inequality is not yet the most serious, even more compared to other cities outside the center-south. In terms of wealth generated, in 2015 the industry generated the city the 5th place in the city, the front of services (6th place) and the agricultural sector (17th place), in a total balance is in 7th place for the sum of sectors. Being among the 100 largest economies, in terms of city in the national ranking (72nd position). GDP in 2015 was R$10,289,960.68. In 2017 it was 6.6 trillion. In 2018 there was an increase in Tetra Pak and Madero's growth, as well as the installation of AmBev. In the same year, trade and services fell to seventh and there is an intention to foster these sectors with the Ponta Grossa Economic Development Council (CDEPG). Ponta Grossa has 56% of the GDP of Campos Gerais, largely due to the Value Added Tax (VAT).

Between the years 1910 and 1920 Ponta Grossa became the second largest economy in the state. The relapse of the economy surfaced in 1940, even during the crisis of 1929 the city managed to remodel itself. In addition, much of the area was a victim of deforestation of native vegetation, as well as other areas of Paraná that were sold to Buenos Aires and London. Ahead the municipality saw the solution in mechanization, in the concentration of capital, the division of factors of production and tasks. The Industrial District of Ponta Grossa was to share with Curitiba the development project for eastern Paraná, but in fact it was to concentrate industries in the capital of Paraná and leave the factories related to agriculture inland. The Industrial District was created in 1971, near the Cará-Cará neighborhood in the south of the city. The city hall gives ownership to industries. In the late 1970s Ponta Grossa became known as one of the main agro-industrial processing centers for soybeans. Until 1987 it was called the Botuquara Industrial District, but from that year on it became the Industrial District Mayor Cyro Martins. In 1992 the planned community determined that much of the right bank of the BR-376 towards Curitiba was destined as Industrial Zone. Between 2001 and 2007 there was an increase of 54.43% of the area occupied by industries.

Between 2010 and 2015 there was a considerable increase in formal jobs, especially in the services sector. The increase was 13,3%, going from 34650 to 39261 formal jobs. In trade alone there was an increase of 15.6% between 2010 and 2017, formal employment rose from 20,199 to 23,353, respectively. Between 2017 and 2018 were 1137 jobs. The amount between June 2016 and June 2017 is less than a third of the figure. Highlighting whether it serves the service sector, followed by the Manufacturing industry, with associated with an increase of more than 40 industries.

Currently, Ponta Grossa is the fifth largest city in export and import in Paraná, with a balance in the order of hundreds of millions of dollars. Exports increased by 136.5% and imports by 19.4% in 2019 compared to 2018, which helps to significantly increase the positive trade balance. 80.9% of the products exported to the municipality go to China and Europe. In the same percentage, soybean as a result of production leads international flow, either as shredded or uncrushed grain or pure oil. 37.3% of imports come from machinery, electrical materials and the like. A recent increase has been detected in recent years in vehicle parts and accessories. When considered in isolation, European countries are the main partners of the pontagrossenses than the Chinese buyer. Recently, a greater partnership has been sought between Mercosur and the European Union, which together make up 1/4 of the world economy, according to Gustavo Ribas Netto, president of the Ponta Grossa Rural Union.

=== Productive sectors ===
For the 2006 data of the Master Plan/ParanáCidade Institute, the largest share is in wholesale trade, but the number of retail establishments is much larger.

Distribution of economic activities in the city of Ponta Grossa (2006)
Sector	Total establishments	Participation in relation to association (%)
Industry	610	0.5
Retail business	3354	0.54
Wholesale	205	0.68
Service	731	0.55

==== Industry ====
Ponta Grossa is considered the second largest industrial center in Paraná. The movement of capital in the region reaches 11.8 billion reais (2018). More than 50% of the GDP of Campos Gerais comes from the capital city. The balance of municipal revenue is almost 5 billion reais. In addition an estimated increase of GDP of 5%. Despite the economic crisis since 2014, Ponta Grossa, including Telêmaco Borba and Jaguariaíva, had together only 1693 transformation industries. By 2018 the city had 7061 industries, with 61% participationbeing the fifth largest share, demonstrating greater diversification compared to other cities in the same region. Even with the most difficult period between 2014 and 2017, there was an increase in the number of jobs, were 44,836 in 2017 compared to 39,527 in 2012, the most prosperous year. It is believed that with the role of entrocamento, the proximity to Curitiba and the port of Paranaguá is responsible for the greater interior park of the state this favors a strong industry. And that for Márcio Zwierewicz is associated with skilled labor, he believes in cooperation for industrial support. It also has a cooperative that serves as financing, offering capital for investments and insurance, among other financial services for the sector.

Only in Ponta Grossa are 56 exporting companies in 2017, which reaches 159 factories throughout the region. Bunge, installed in the city was the fourth largest exporter in Paraná. For the 2017 data, Ponta Grossa is the fourth largest exporter in the state (R$1.05 billion), ahead of cities like Araucária, Londrina, Cascavel and Foz do Iguaçu. At the same time, it is the fifth largest exporter (R$283.2 million). In April 2015 reached second place (470 million reais) in the placement, behind only Paranaguá. Louis Dreyfus Company, Cargill Agricultural, Bunge Foods, BIOSEV (Louis Dreyfus Company), Tetra Pak Brazil, COFCO Brazil and COFCO Internacional, LP Brazil, Crown Embalagens, Makita Tools, Continental of the Brazil, Heineken and Meridional TCS breweries are companies that export more than 50 million sometimes exceeding the mark of 100 million, which together amounts to 330 million reais.

==== Agriculture ====
Despite the minor highlight, agriculture adds 2200 establishments. The main crops are peanuts, rice, beans, cassava, maize and the largest cultivation of soybeans. Even though it plays a significant role in the state itself, it represents 3% of all value added and represents only 2.1% of its territorial extension. Ponta Grossa was considered the "Capital Mundial da Soja" (in English: "World Capital of the Soybean") between the decade of 1960 and 1970. Even being competitions of the Queen of the Soybean between 1971 and 1980 realized by the Sanbra. The idea was to represent the grain as economic potential and productivity. Before the fame Xuxa Meneghel was in Ponta Grossa and participated as a candidate of the Queen of Soy. In 2015 Vilson Hilgemberg along with his son Alisson Hilgemberg reached the mark of 142 sacks of soybeans per hectare proposed by a challenge of maximizing productivity. And being that year the largest producer of oleoginosa in Brazil. The average production is 40 to 60 bags. The Hilgemberg family said it intends to pass the world record of 179 bags per hectare. Between 2017 and 2019, more than 2 million tons of soybeans were produced in each crop. Soy is also represented by its derivatives as bran and oil, Pontagross products that are most exported abroad, reaching in 2018 to 3.14 billion, the main destination being China. The beneficiation is concentrated among 5 companies: Bunge, Cargill, Nidera, Louis Dreyfus and Cofco.

Promotion and assistance has been carried out in family farming. Technical assistance, seedling and seed donation are made by the Parana Institute of Technical Assistance and Rural Extension (EMATER). One of the destinations for small property products is for public schools, Feira Verde (in English: Green Fair): project that allows the exchange of recyclable for food – in 2019 with 18 producers and even for the supply of military battalions. The municipality has the Associação de Agricultura Ecológica Conchas Velhas (in English: Conchas Velhas Ecological Agriculture Association Familiar), currently the only one that belongs to a federal government program that purchases these foods and distributes them to educational institutions, for example. It was created in 2008 in the rural district of Uvaia. Between 2010 and 2015 there were 854 farmers participating in the program.

==== Commerce and services ====
It is the sector that occupies the most labor, due to its own characteristics. This segment occupies more than half of Campos Gerais' VAT (largely due to trade and vehicle repair), only with the value of Ponta Grossa, without considering other sectors. IPARDES data for 2000 showed the low dynamics surrounding commercial and service activity in the city so it's shown in the value added, lower compared to other medium-sized cities in the interior of the state. But it is balanced by the stronger secondary sector even in relation to larger cities. In 1998 there were only four companies destined to trade among the largest locally, which contributes to the low value that is taxed. Despite this, trade and repair services together represent 55.83% of the business structure in the municipality in 2004. Due to its degree of urbanization the sector is more prominent than agriculture, which is larger in the neighboring municipalities. Ponta Grossa has already passed the mark of 56,000 jobs in its 5300 commerce and services. The share of the tertiary sector in the share of formal jobs reached 67.2% in 2001, since the 1940s the figure has been increasing although there was a decline in the 1980s due to the faster expansion of the industry but it grew again. in the late twentieth century in the incorporation of workers.

== Tourism ==
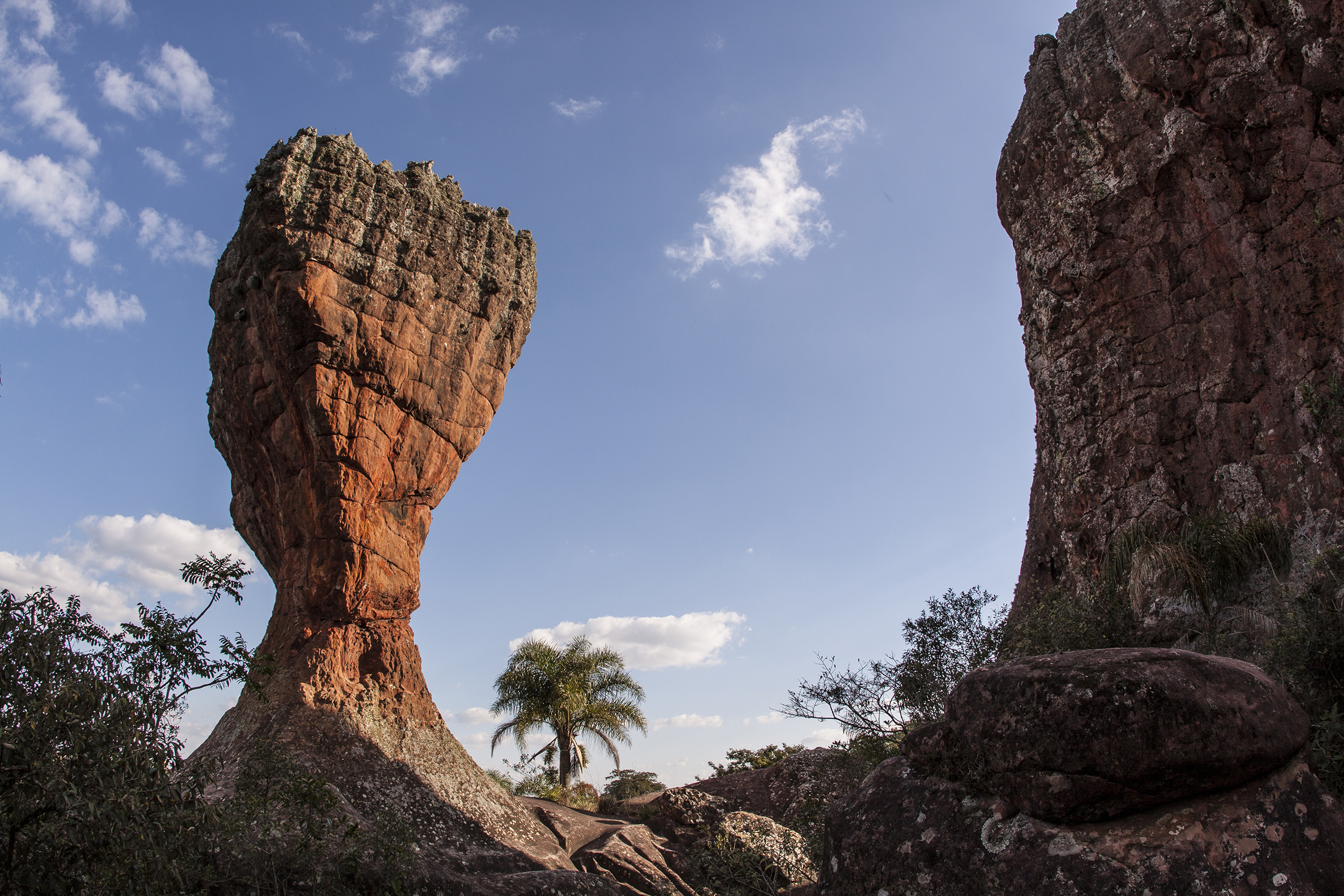
Vila Velha Cup (in Portuguese: "Taça de Vila Velha"), Ponta Grossa postcard

Several tourist attractions are in the municipality, but the main place visited is Vila Velha State Park. Even though business travel is the one that most receives visitors in the city. In tourist terms, the city is important because it is a regional center (in the Campos Gerais of the Paraná). The Marketing & Tourism magazine cites in addition to Vila Velha, the Buraco do Padre, German colonies, St. Ann Cathedral and Abadia da Ressureição as being the most important attractions in relation to marketing, contemplating nature, historical, cultural and religious tourism. Was in the third tourism hierarchy group in Paraná by TripAdivisor evaluations in 2018, along with Cascavel and Paranaguá. Ponta Grossa City Hall lists 7 natural attractions, 11 religious attractions, 11 monuments, 5 museums and 16 other buildings (including libraries, extinct railway stations and historical and cultural buildings). In the municipality there is the project "Conhecendo PG" (in English: Knowing PG) which since 2011 takes the local community to visit tourist spots within its political limit, being promoted by the Municipal Tourism Secretary, Tourism Department of the State University of Ponta Grossa and the bus company VCG. The visits are accompanied by academics to highlight the importance of preserving and valuing the attractions.

Although in 2011, Ponta Grossa is declared as the fourth tourist inducing municipality in Paraná, it was not officially classified. Some obstacles are the infrastructure and accessibility of most places, in addition the necessity to greater marketing. Still, the city participated for the first time in the Brazil International Tourism Exchange (Brite) in the same year, one of the main tourism events. Still not fully explored, rural tourism has been growing in the last century. There was qualification of rural producers who began to receive visitors mostly from 2001, allowing access to wineries, cheesemaking, vegetable gardens and the manufacture of jellies, preserves, colonial coffee, candied candies, take and harvest and access to natural attractions.

=== Attractions ===
==== Vila Velha State Park ====
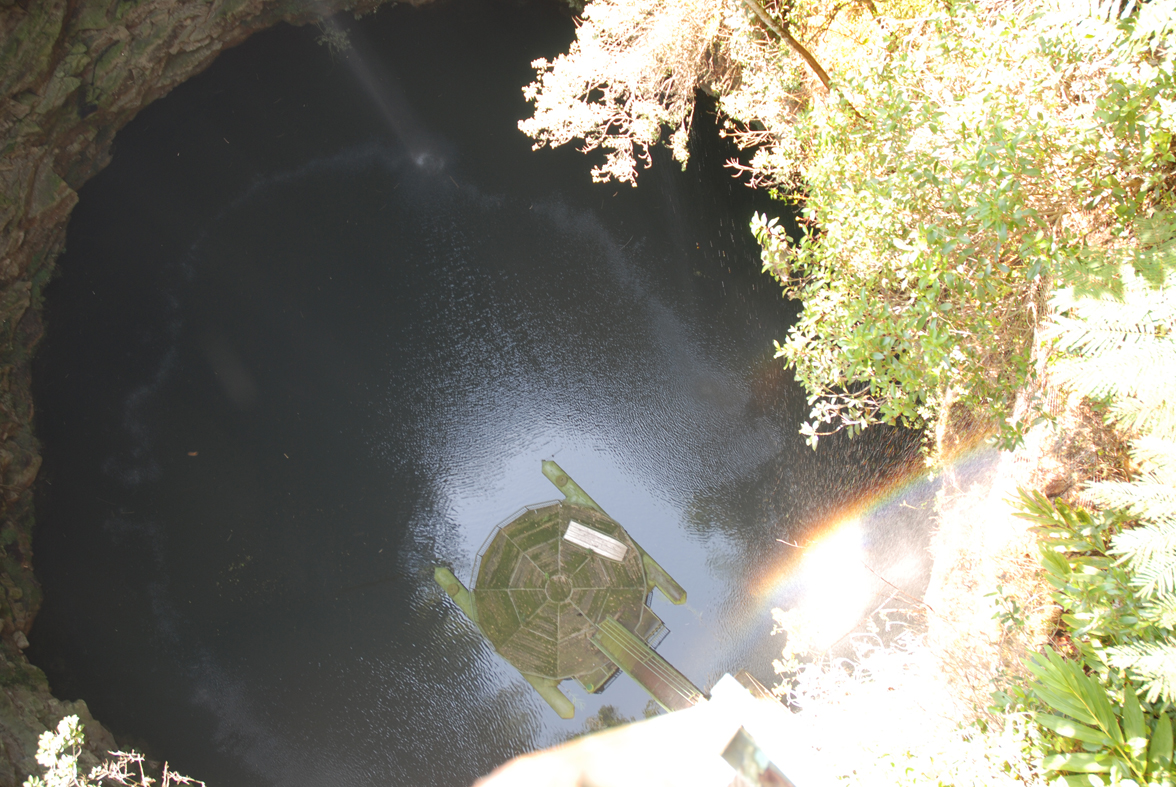
Furna that has the panoramic elevator, known as "Furna 1"

The Vila Velha State Park was created on 12 October 1953, being listed as Historical and Artistic Heritage of Paraná on 18 January 1966, remaining closed between 2002 and 2004 for revitalization. Access is via BR-376 and is about 28 km from Ponta Grossa and 84 km from the capital of Paraná. The park is a conservation unit under Brazilian law and is administered by the Environmental Institute of Paraná. Much of the route, visitation takes place through trails. What most calls the attention of tourists is the features (which often resemble objects) of the exposed sandstones that originate from erosion and weathering, giving off particles during the melting of the rocks. These that formed on the sand deposit in the Carboniferous, 360 million years ago (Ice age). There is no consensus on which is the main agent, although it certainly involves the action of water. In its area it also has the furnas that are "depressions that resemble craters", there are six furnas in the place, but only two are open to visitation, in one of them there was a panoramic elevator, currently disabled. Also located in the park is Lagoa Dourada, which is also a valley hat was silted up using the material from the Guabiroba River that it has been receiving for being in its floodplain, similar to what occurs in Lagoa Tarumã. The name is due to the reflection of sunlight on the mineral mica present in the place.

On 19 February 2020, private action on the park's infrastructure is authorized, authorized by the state governor, Ratinho Júnior (PSD). Eco Parques do Brasil S/A will have 30 years to explore, however, environmental management will continue to be public. Activities such as tree climbing, cycling and zip line must be implemented. Ticket sales, maintenance, monitoring and all necessary support are one of the obligations of the company that won the bid. However, for some professors and researchers, administration should remain only in the public sphere. However, it can be beneficial in terms of visibility and visitors as long as it has the least possible impact, in addition to adapting to the location.

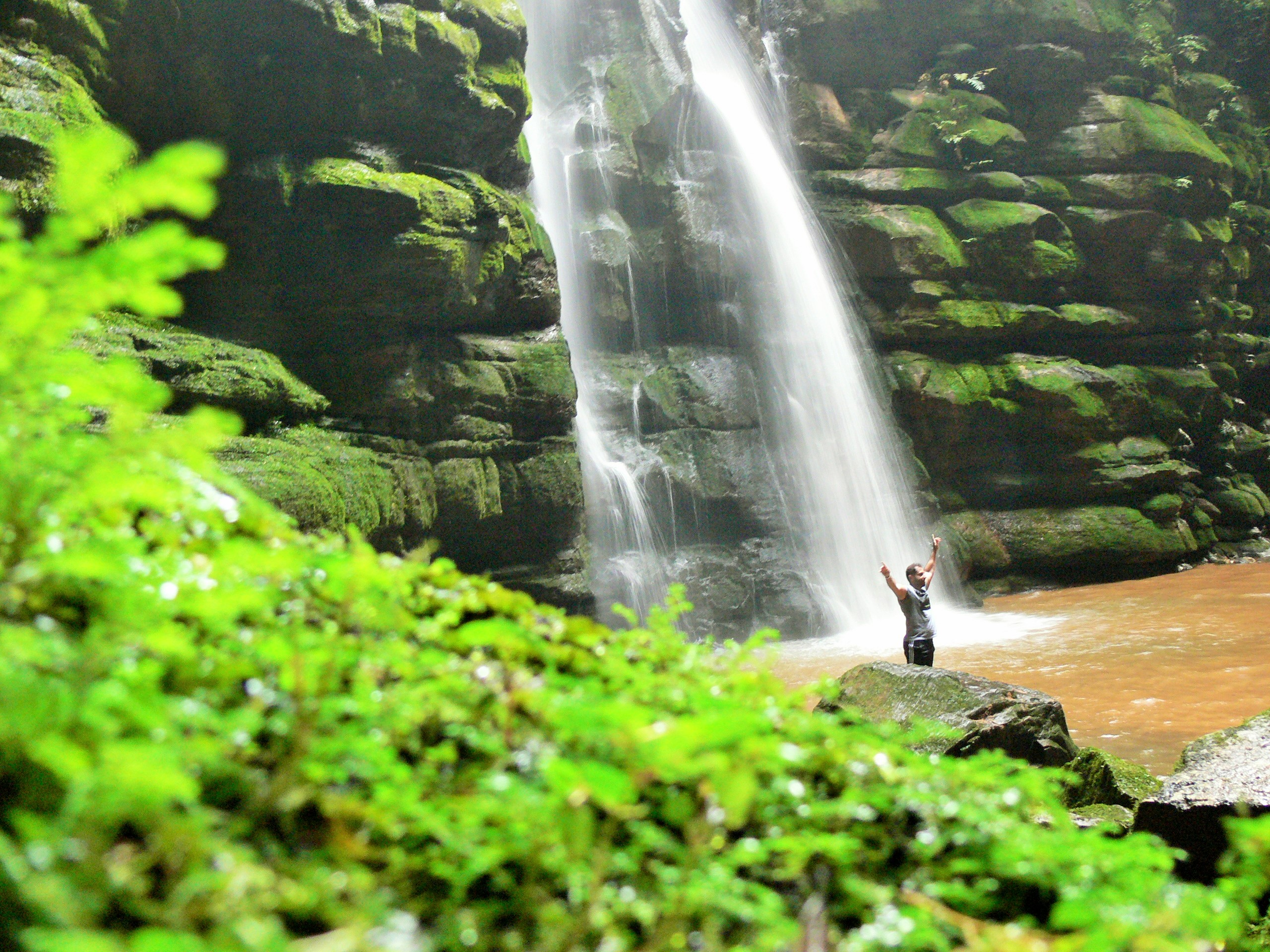
View from inside Buraco do Padre where there is a natural pool

==== Buraco do Padre ====
Buraco do Padre is a furna, just like the ones found in the Vila Velha State Park, that is, formed by underground erosion where the dissolution of sandstone minerals and the direction of faults and fractures contribute to forming the feature. It is situated on a private property owned by Álvaro Scheffer, 24 km from the center of Ponta Grossa and relatively close to the protected area of Vila Velha. Access is via the PR-513 connecting Itaiacoca, with part of the road not paved. The name has an uncertain origin, but it must have appeared in the second half of the twentieth century, for being on a high and secluded plateau, religious used it for retreats and thus the most intimate and individual contact with the divine. The attraction is inserted in the Campos Gerais National Park, allowing public use such as contemplation, walking the trails and bathing, just like in the Integral Protection Area of the Devonian Escarpment. Inside there is a 25 m high waterfall, through the flow of the Quebra-Pedra River that follows the NE-SW direction controlled by the Arch of the Ponta Grossa. At 50 m upstream there is another smaller furna.

The need to maintain the trail and access road in the mid-2010s was pointed out. The bathrooms, wooden walkway, and several notices for care and fauna and places for food were revitalized. There were problems with theft of objects, vandalism and loud sound.

== Education ==
The city has two public colleges:

- Ponta Grossa State University (UEPG) (Pt: Universidade Estadual de Ponta Grossa)
- Parana Federal Technological University (UTFPR) (Pt:Universidade Tecnológica Federal do Paraná)

Both institutions attract undergraduate and graduate students from many regions, mostly from the south of Brazil. The city also has private colleges as Faculdades Uniao, Faculdades Santa Amelia (Secal) e Sant'Ana, Centro de Ensino Superior dos Campos Gerais (Cescage) and a campus of Centro Universitário Campos de Andrade (Uniandrade).

== Culture ==
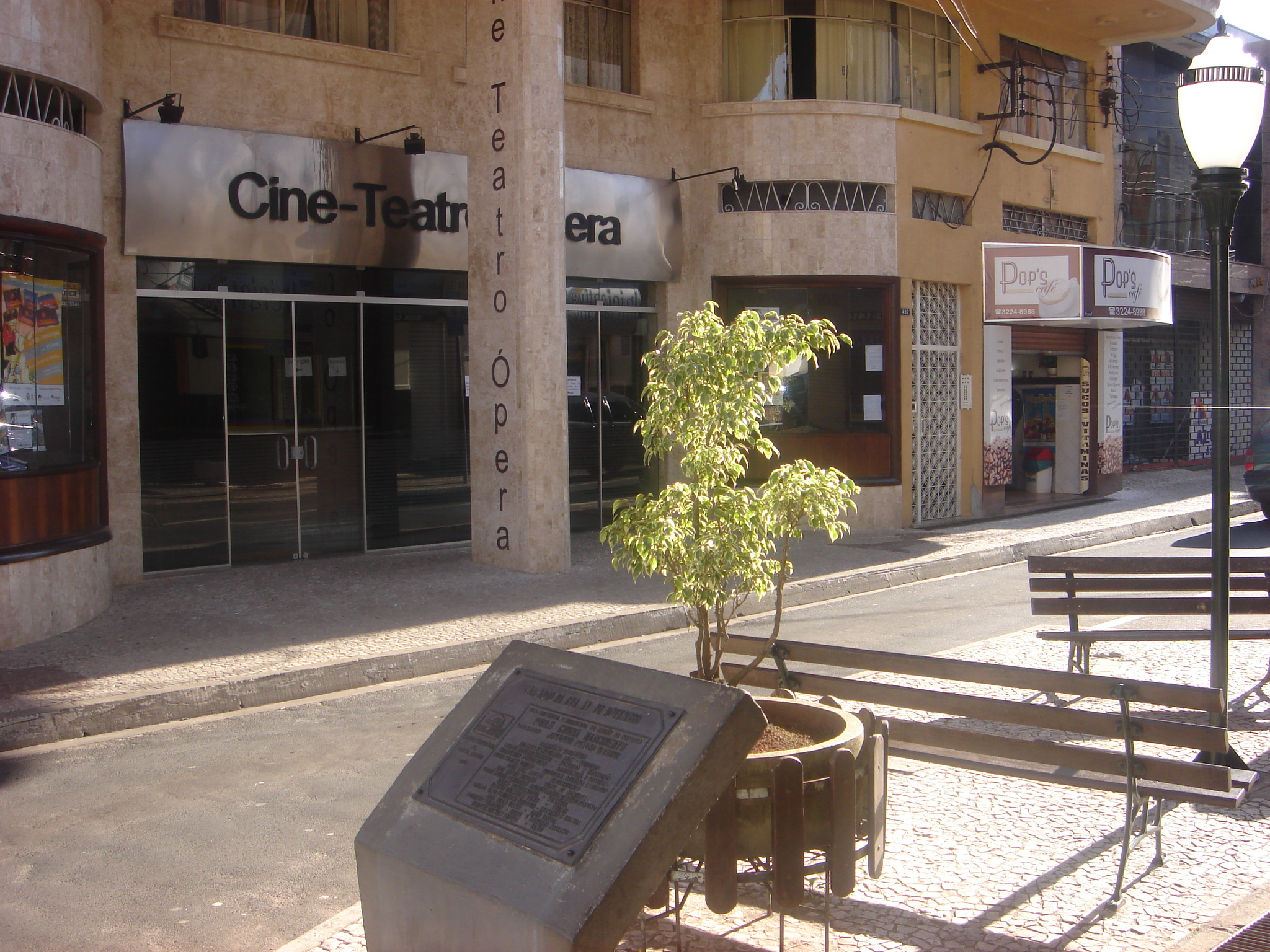
Cine Teatro Opera, it also hosts theatrical events as well as the National Amateur Theater Festival

Ponta Grossa has three theaters, movie theaters, art galleries and spaces for visual arts and music expositions and events. Ponta Grossa State University (UEPG) offers majors in Visual Arts and Music. The city also has its own orchestra, the Ponta Grossa Symphony Orchestra, and the Paulimo Martins Music School.

Museums

- Campos Gerais Museum
- Natural Sciences Museum
- Archaeology museum
- Aristides Spósito Municipal Museum

Theaters

- Opera Theater
- Marista Theater
- Pax Theater

Cinema

- Multiplex Palladium
- Cinema Lumière

== Sport ==
The local football team is Operário Ferroviário Esporte Clube. There also used to be the Ponta Grossa Esporte Clube between 1994 and 2003.

== Public administration ==
The municipal government is composed of an executive, headed by the Mayor and his Secretariat, and a legislative branch, represented by the City Council. The sitting mayor (term 2021–2024) is Elizabeth Schmidt (PSD). The Municipality of Ponta Grossa is composed of 14 aldermen (or is it 15) elected to four-year terms.

== Notable people ==
- Cassio Rippel, Brazilian sport shooter, gold medalist at the Pan American Games
- Bruno Fuchs, footballer
- Sandro Alex, politician and broadcaster
