= Carambeí =

Coordinates: 24°56′S 50°05′W

- Municipality
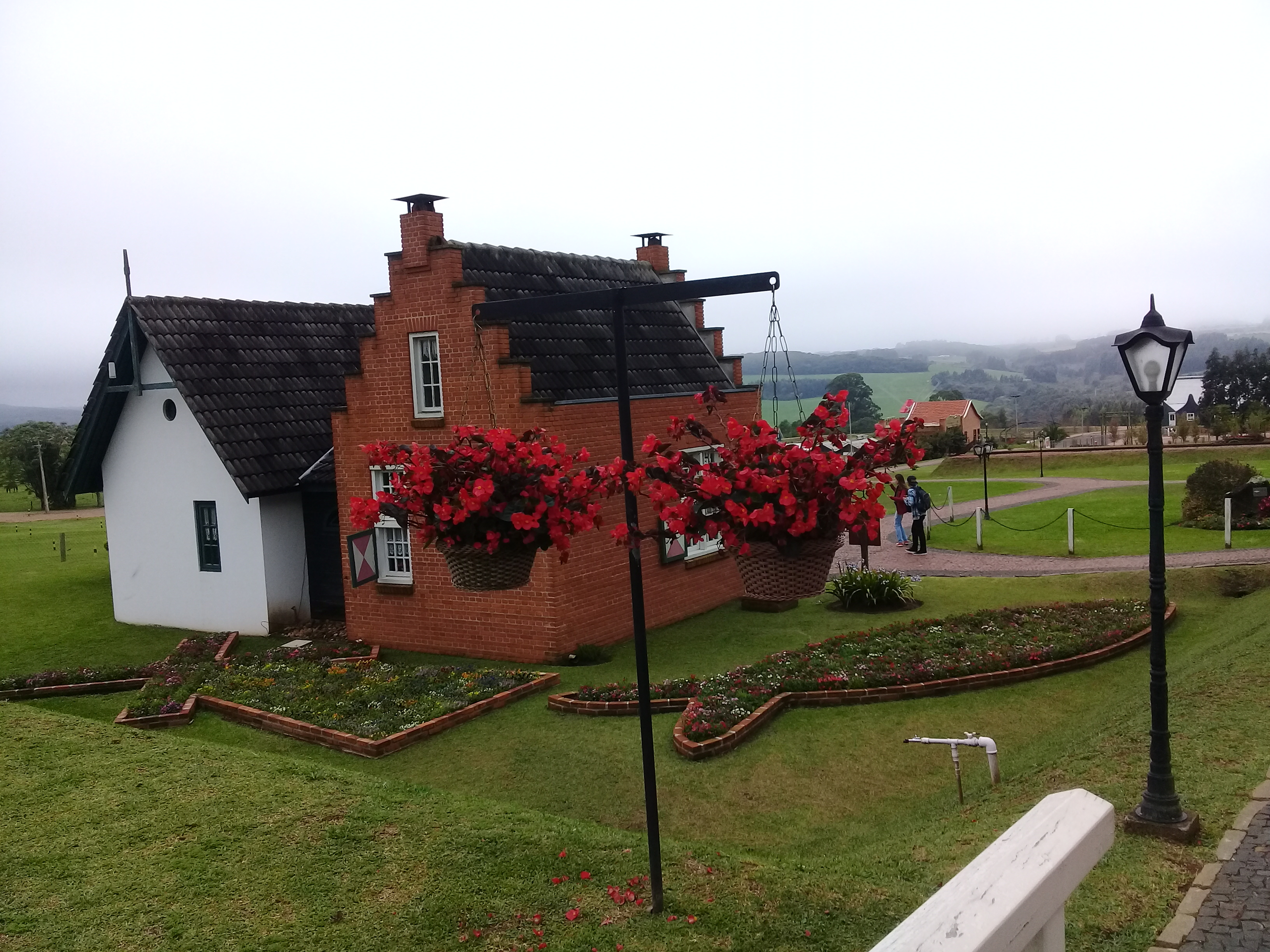
- Representations of Dutch houses in the Historic Park of the Carambeí

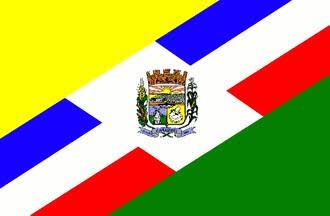
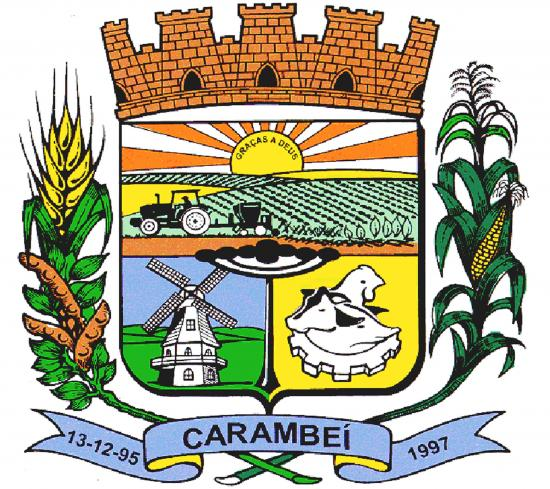
- Flag Coat of arms
- Interactive map of Carambeí
- Country: Brazil
- Region: South
- State: Paraná
- Founded: 1911

Population (2020)
  - Total: 23,825
- Time zone: UTC−3 (BRT)

Carambeí is a municipality in the state of Paraná in the Southern Region of Brazil. The city originated from a farm that was an obligatory stop on the Caminho do Viamão between the central-west region of Rio Grande do Sul and the state of São Paulo. It was founded on April 4, 1911, by a group of Dutch immigrants and developed from the Cooperativa Batavo (now the Cooperative Frisia).

== Etymology ==
The name Cararambí derives from the Guarani karumbe (turtle) and "y" (water, river): the turtles river.

== History ==
Carambeí was founded in 4 April 1911, and became a municipality on 13 December 1995.

== Climate ==
Carambeí is classified as oceanic climate (Köppen climate classification: Cfb). In summer, the temperature rises to 27°C, whereas winters are somewhat cold, the temperature reaching 10°C. Frost is common in the winter.

== See also ==
- List of municipalities in Paraná
