= Philanthropies =

Department of The Church of Jesus Christ of Latter-day Saints

- Founded: April 29, 1955
- Founder: The Church of Jesus Christ of Latter-day Saints
- Location(s): 1450 North University Avenue; Provo, Utah 84604; United States
- Coordinates: 40°15′12″N 111°39′29″W
- Key people: Tanise Chung-Hoon, Director
- Website: philanthropies.churchofjesuschrist.org
- Formerly called: LDS Philanthropies (2005–2018); LDS Foundation (1982–2005); The Development Office (1973–1982); Church Education Development Office (1971–1973); BYU Destiny Fund (1955–1971)

Philanthropies, formerly LDS Philanthropies, is a department of the Church of Jesus Christ of Latter-day Saints (LDS Church) and is responsible for facilitating donations to humanitarian and educational initiatives. The department works under the direction of the church's Presiding Bishop. The most widely known educational projects are the operation of church-owned schools, such as Brigham Young University (BYU). Humanitarian funds are given to Latter-day Saint Charities which sponsors and organizes relief efforts. In 2019, the church reported over 3,000 community-based projects with an excess of 2,000 partners, in locations around the world. A 2020 statistic reported a total of $2.3 billion that had been donated over Philanthropies' existence.

== History ==
Founded in 1955, Philanthropies has evolved in both purpose and brand over the intervening 65 years. Initially called the BYU Destiny Fund, it became the Church Education Development Office in 1971, but then quickly changed to The Development Office in 1973. The name changed to the LDS Foundation in 1982 and then LDS Philanthropies in 2005. The current name, The Church of Jesus Christ of Latter-day Saints – Philanthropies, was changed in 2019 as part of a focus by the LDS Church to move away from the monikers 'LDS' and 'Mormon'.

N. Eldon Tanner initially created a task force to address philanthropic issues in the LDS Church and named Donald T. Nelson as the first director. The organization reported to the Church Commissioner of Education until 1980 when it began reporting to the First Quorum of the Seventy and Ronald E. Poelman, a church general authority. In 1981, Philanthropies began reporting indirectly to the Presiding Bishopric's office. This continued until 1986 when LDS Foundation began reporting directly to the Presiding Bishop, Victor L. Brown. An advisory board was approved February 5, 2000 to supervise funds. The church built offices in Provo, Utah to house LDS Philanthropies. The building was dedicated by Henry B. Eyring, First Counselor in the church's First Presidency on May 16, 2008. As a church department, Philanthropies continues to operate under the direction of the Presiding Bishopric.

== Transparency and accreditation ==
The LDS Church, and its affiliated entities, do not publish a complete financial report on the amount of funds received or their use. Addressing this topic in 2018, the church's presiding bishop, Gérald Caussé, published a Q&A, stating that "The Church is not a financial institution or a commercial corporation [and] chooses not to publish the details of its finances...". However, certain entities do publish limited details. For instance, BYU-Idaho stated it received 6.3 million dollars in donations in 2018, of which, 69% went to need-based aid for individual students, administered through a university grant.

Due to these transparency practices, Latter-day Saint Charities does not meet requirements for evaluation by established charity-rating organizations, such as the BBB Wise Giving Alliance or Charity Navigator.

== Educational efforts ==
Some funds donated through Philanthropies are used by the LDS Church and its affiliated educational entities, including: BYU, BYU-Hawaii, BYU-Idaho, BYU-Pathway Worldwide, and Ensign College.

Donations to education efforts help provide scholarships and create mentored learning opportunities for students from around the world. For example, BYU-Hawaii helps students from the Pacific Islands and Asia. Additional efforts include the Perpetual Education Fund, which provides repayable loans for students in developing nations to obtain an education. When graduates of the program become employed they repay the loan and the money is used to replenish the endowment.

== Latter-day Saint Charities ==
While welfare programs within the LDS Church funded by fast offerings are generally for members, humanitarian donations are used to provide assistance in countries around the world to people without regard to religion or race. These donations provide assistance to victims of natural disasters, including aid such as hygiene kits, food and water, and blankets. Current humanitarian projects include neonatal resuscitation training, wheelchair placement, eye surgery initiatives to help the blind, well drilling projects for water sources, and other health and wellness projects.

Humanitarian aid deliveries are supervised by service missionaries who live and serve in countries around the world. Many volunteers wear distinctive yellow shirts that said Mormon Helping Hands.

Latter-day Saint Charities sponsors relief and development projects in 195 countries and is largely run with volunteer labor. Since its founding in 1985, the organization has donated $2.3 billion worth of aid and assistance. Sharon Eubank is the current director. Latter-day Saint Charities operates both independently and in cooperation with other charitable organizations and governments including American Red Cross, Catholic Relief Services, Muslim Aid, Southern Philippines Medical Center, UNICEF, and the United States Agency for International Development.

In response to the ongoing COVID pandemic, in February 2021, Latter-day Saint Charities announced a pledge of $20 million to support UNICEF in delivering vaccines worldwide. This pledge complemented an earlier $3 million donation to assist with food, water, and medical supplies, and represents the largest donation from the private sector to support UNICEF's ACT Accelerator and COVAX work.

== Family history research ==
As of 2022, the LDS Church operates more than 5,700 Family History Centers in 146 countries. The publicly-available centers supply resources for research and study of genealogy and family history, and are financed, in part, through donations to Philanthropies. The church also finances one of the largest genealogical databases, familysearch.org, which contains more than 36 million names that are linked into families and approximately 600 million names of deceased individuals, indexed from historical records. The Family History Library at Temple Square is the largest genealogical library in the world.

== See also ==
- Welfare Square
- Zions Cooperative Mercantile Institution
- Deseret Industries
