= Welfare Square =

Complex in Salt Lake City operated by The Church of Jesus Christ of Latter-day Saints

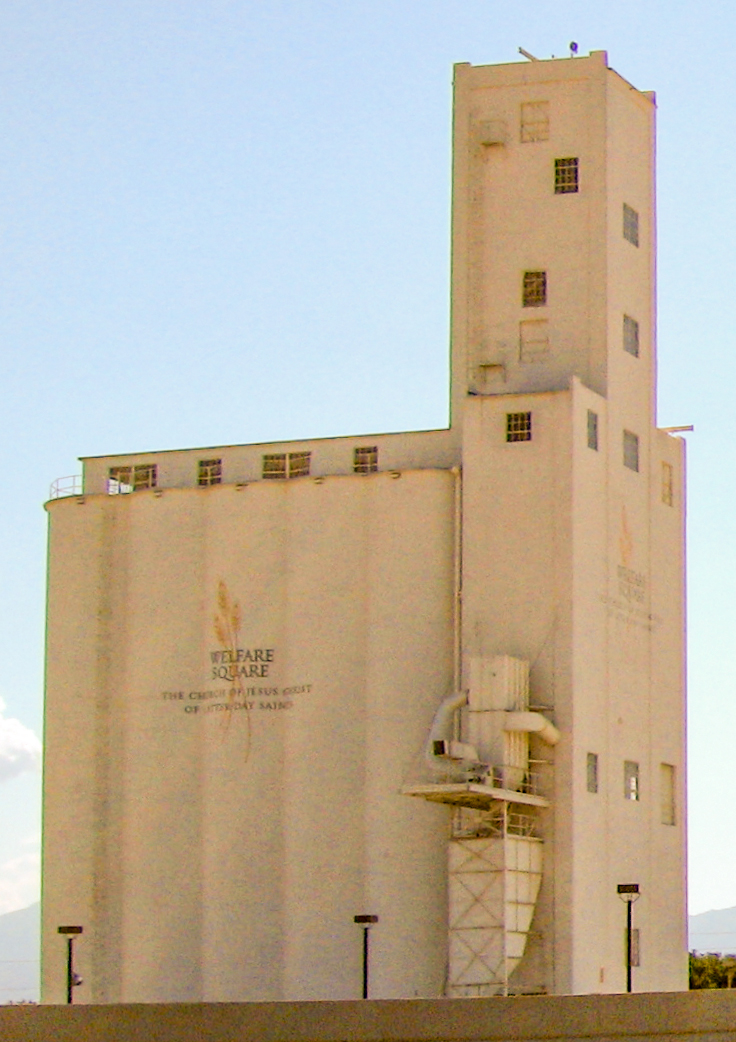
- Welfare Square grain silo
- Interactive map of the Welfare Square area

General information
- Location: 751 West 700 South, Salt Lake City, Utah, United States
- Coordinates: 40°45′11″N 111°54′47″W
- Opened: 1938
- Owner: The Church of Jesus Christ of Latter-day Saints

Website
- churchofjesuschrist.org/learn/welfare-square

Welfare Square is a complex in downtown Salt Lake City, Utah owned and operated by the Church of Jesus Christ of Latter-day Saints (LDS Church), to provide material assistance to poor and otherwise needy individuals and families. Welfare Square is part of the Church's Church Welfare System. It includes a 178-foot (54 m) grain silo, fruit orchards, a milk-processing plant, a cannery, a bakery, a Deseret Industries thrift store, a private employment office, and the LDS Church's largest Bishop's storehouse, as well as associated administrative offices.

Welfare Square provides regular employment for approximately 50 people, in addition to the 200 rotating volunteers needed to provide its services and run its operations. Fast offerings from local LDS congregations fund its operations.

== History ==
Welfare Square was created in 1938, under the direction of the Church's General Welfare Committee, which itself had been formed just two years earlier. Throughout the 1930s and 1940s, as the United States was experiencing the Great Depression Welfare Square became the flagship of the Church's Welfare Program.

A four-year renovation started in the late 1990s, and was completed in 2001. The 1940 granary building was the only structure on the site that was not significantly refurbished or newly built at that time. The concrete grain elevator can hold 318,000-US-bushel (11,200 m^{3}) of wheat (about 19 million pounds).

In 2011 the Utah legislature passed, and the governor signed, a bill commemorating the founding of the LDS Church's Welfare System, of which Welfare Square is the centerpiece.

== Values ==
As part of the LDS Church's larger Welfare Program, all aid received at Welfare Square is based on personal responsibility, thrift, and work; recipients of aid may be asked to volunteer their time after receiving help.

== See also ==
- Beliefs and practices of The Church of Jesus Christ of Latter-day Saints: Welfare Program
- LDS Humanitarian Services
