= Deseret Industries =

Thrift store chain owned by LDS Church

- Founded: 1938
- Founder: Heber J. Grant
- Tax ID no.: 87-0429068
- Purpose: Charity, Vocational training
- Headquarters: 50 E North Temple, Salt Lake City, UT 84150
- Origins: The Great Depression
- Number of locations: 46 thrift stores (2026)
- Region served: Global
- Products: Second-hand clothing, footwear, bedding, books, furniture, jewelry, electronics, toys, and housewares
- Owner: The Church of Jesus Christ of Latter-day Saints
- Website: Deseret Industries

Deseret Industries (/ˌdɛzəˈrɛt/) (known locally as DI) is a non-profit organization and a division of the welfare services provided by the Church of Jesus Christ of Latter-day Saints (LDS Church).

DI thrift stores are similar to the well-known Goodwill Industries. They are generally located in areas where LDS Church membership is common, with a total of 46 stores in Arizona, California, Idaho, Nevada, Oregon, Texas, Utah, and Washington. As with other thrift stores, people donate items they no longer need, such as furniture, appliances, books, computers, and clothing, which the store sells. Deseret Industries also sells new furniture, much of it received directly from its own manufacturing plant in Salt Lake City. DI also provides job skill training for physically, emotionally, and socially challenged people, and seeks to place them into private sector employment.

== History ==
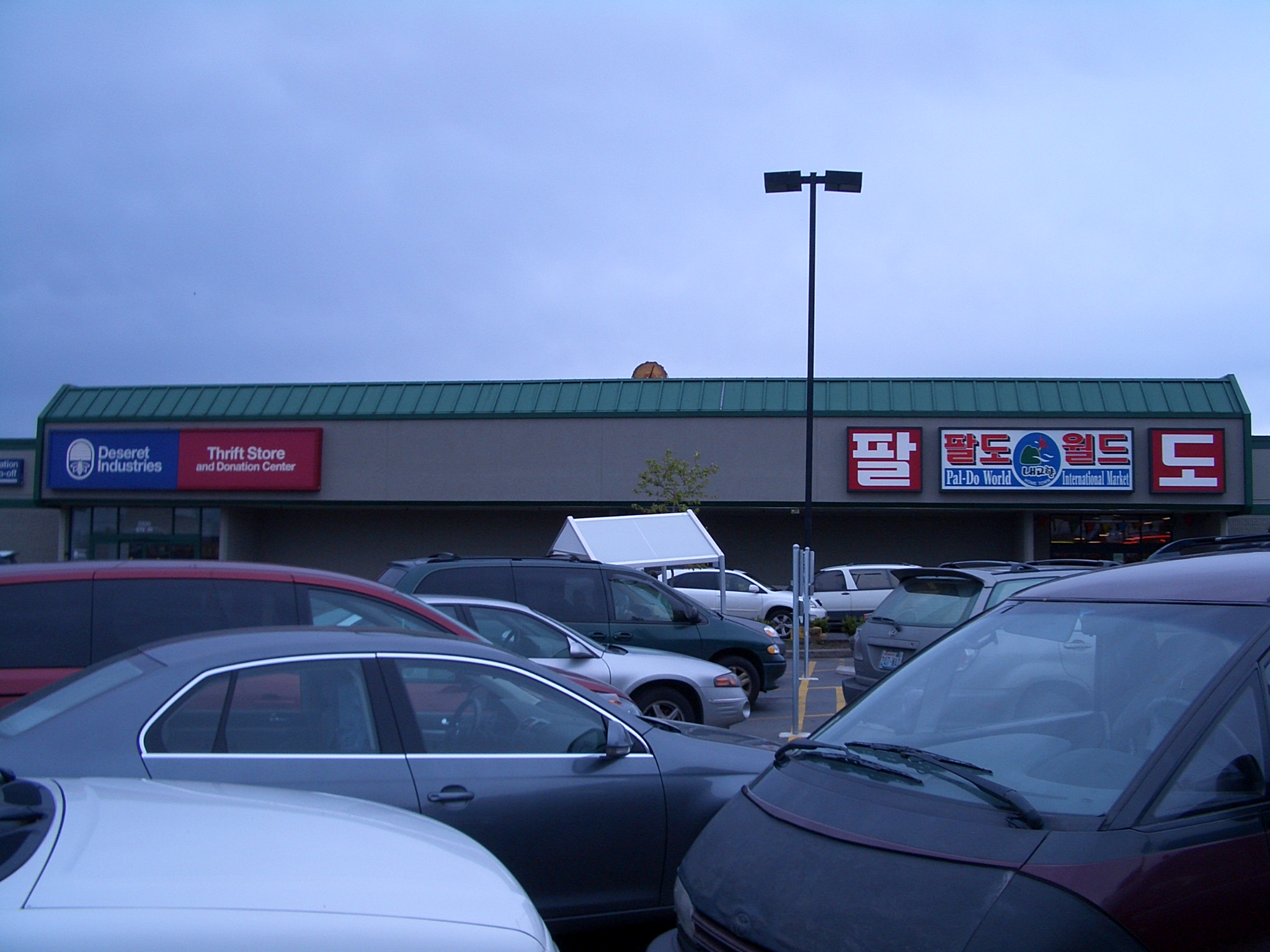
A Deseret Industries store in Federal Way, Washington. This location was relocated to a new building in Puyallup.

DI was established in August 1938 by church president Heber J. Grant, toward the end of the Great Depression. The goal was to collect donated goods, employ people to collect and repair items, and sell items through thrift stores. DI's parent welfare division has gone through several name changes and reorganizations; it was initially known as the Church Security Plan.

As of 2022, DI had 46 stores and additional manufacturing facilities. In 2020, DI locations were temporarily closed as a result of the coronavirus pandemic.

== Outreach ==
As a welfare entity, DI provides useful goods at low cost to the public, as well as clothing and other items for humanitarian efforts throughout the world. Some of the donated goods are given to people in the community upon recommendation of the church's local bishop, in the event of a disaster such as a fire or flood. Any revenues that exceed expenses is used to support other LDS Church welfare organizations and programs throughout the world. DI provides work training and rehabilitation opportunities for people referred by an LDS bishop. Since employment at DI is considered rehabilitative training rather than a career, employment normally does not last longer than 18 months. Membership in the LDS Church is not required for training at DI, but the local bishop must sign an endorsement to receive training and services.

== Purpose ==
DI provides an opportunity to learn new skills, earn money to help support the employee and their family, and receive help finding a suitable job when ready. Those in training are called associates. Some associates have disabilities or are elderly, making it difficult to get jobs at other places. The goal of DI, as noted by its slogan People Helping People Help Themselves, is to encourage trainees to be self-reliant and become employable in the job market with goals to leave training and enter the job market. In addition to trainees, there are full-time staff such as store manager, assistant store manager, job coach trainer, and development counselor.

Trainees of DI do not receive benefits such as retirement, medical coverage, or vacation. They do, however, allow sick leave after a certain number of hours have been spent at the job. DI notes that this is the case because its goal is to prepare them for the workplace and encourage them to work in the community. DI works in conjunction with Development Counseling Services (DCS). DCS assists church leaders as they empower individuals and families in overcoming barriers that prevent them from achieving long-term self-reliance. Development counselors are licensed professionals who work closely with the individual, their church leaders, mentors and family members.

== Services ==
- Career and Technical Education: Deseret Industries partners with community colleges, applied technology centers, and other institutions that offer training courses in accounting, information technology, health care, and other trade areas.
- Business Partnerships: Deseret Industries provides help in an associate's chosen career through an internship-type experience at a business who is in partnership with the organization. The partnerships are essentially a trial period in which the associates are paid through Deseret Industries to develop skills and show their capabilities.
- Community Partnerships and Grants: partnering with community agencies to assist those whom they serve and provide service opportunities for groups and individuals.
- Humanitarian Aid: Items not sold in the stores are sent off for humanitarian relief.

== See also ==
- Charity shop
- Welfare Square
- Zions Cooperative Mercantile Institution
- Philanthropies
- Latter-day Saint Charities
