= The Church of Jesus Christ of Latter-day Saints =

Largest church adhering to Mormonism

- Official logo since 2020 featuring the Christus statue
- Classification: Restorationist
- Orientation: Latter Day Saint movement
- Scripture: Standard Works
- Theology: Latter-day Saint doctrine (Note: Also known informally as Mormonism); Nontrinitarian
- Polity: Hierarchical
- President (Note: The church president is often referred to as "the Prophet".): Dallin H. Oaks
- Region: Worldwide
- Headquarters: Salt Lake City, Utah, U.S.
- Founder: Joseph Smith
- Origin: April 6, 1830; 196 years ago (as Church of Christ); Fayette, New York, U.S.
- Separations: LDS denominations
- Congregations: 32,046 (2025)
- Members: 17,887,212 (2025)
- Missionaries: 114,727 (2025) (Note: Missionaries are divided into three subgroups: 78,596 Full-time teaching missionaries, 31,613 Senior service missionaries, and 4,518 Young service missionaries (2025).)
- Aid organization: Philanthropies
- Tertiary institutions: 4
- Other names: LDS Church; Mormon Church; Church of Jesus Christ
- Official website: churchofjesuschrist.org

The Church of Jesus Christ of Latter-day Saints, informally known as the LDS Church or Mormon Church, is the largest denomination in the Latter Day Saint movement. Founded during the Second Great Awakening, the church is headquartered in Salt Lake City, Utah, United States, and has established congregations and built temples worldwide. According to the church, as of 2024, it had more than 17.5 million members, of which more than 6.8 million live in the United States. The church also reports more than 109,000 volunteer missionaries and more than 200 dedicated temples. (Note: The LDS Church has 385 temples in various phases, which includes 227 dedicated temples (221 operating, 6 undergoing renovations), 6 with dedications scheduled, 59 under construction, 5 with groundbreaking ceremonies scheduled, and 86 others announced (not yet under construction).)

The church's theology is restorationist and nontrinitarian. It is a Christian denomination and includes a belief in the doctrine of salvation through Jesus Christ and his substitutionary atonement on behalf of humankind. It is often included in the lists of larger Christian denominations, though various other Christian churches (Note: including the Catholic Church, Eastern and Oriental Orthodox, evangelicals, and many mainline Protestant churches (Sources from the Catholic Church, the Lutheran Church – Missouri Synod, the Wisconsin Evangelical Lutheran Synod, the Evangelical Lutheran Church in America, the United Methodist Church, the Presbyterian Church (USA), the Anglican Communion, the Oriental Orthodox Churches, and the Eastern Orthodox Churches)) have considered the LDS Church to be distinct and separate from mainstream Christianity. The church has a canon of four scriptural texts: the Holy Bible, the Book of Mormon, the Doctrine and Covenants (D&C), and the Pearl of Great Price. Other than the Bible, the majority of the church canon consists of material believed by the church's members to have been revealed by God to Joseph Smith, including texts described as lost parts of the Bible, and other works believed to have been written by ancient prophets, including the Book of Mormon. Members adhere to church laws of sexual purity, health, Sabbath observance, and tithing. The church teaches ordinances through which adherents make covenants with God, including baptism, endowment, and celestial marriage.

The church was founded by Joseph Smith in 1830, originally as the Church of Christ in western New York. Under Smith's leadership, the church's headquarters moved successively to Ohio, Missouri, and Illinois. After his death in 1844 and the resultant succession crisis, the majority of his followers sided with Brigham Young, who led the church to its current headquarters in Salt Lake City. Young and his successors continued the church's growth, first throughout the Intermountain West, and later as a national and international organization. The church has been criticized throughout its history; modern criticism includes disputes over the church's historical claims, treatment of minorities, and finances. The church's controversial practice of polygamy was curtailed in 1890 and officially rescinded in 1904.

Members of the church, known as Latter-day Saints or informally as Mormons, believe that the church president is a modern-day "prophet, seer, and revelator" and that Jesus Christ, under the direction of God the Father, leads the church by revealing his will and delegating his priesthood authority to its president. The president heads a hierarchical structure descending from areas to stakes and wards. At the local and regional levels, the church has a volunteer clergy, and wards are led by bishops. Male members may be ordained to the priesthood, provided they are living by the standards of the church. Women are not ordained to the priesthood but occupy leadership roles in some church organizations. The church maintains a large missionary program that proselytizes and conducts humanitarian services worldwide; both men and women may serve as missionaries. The church also funds and participates in humanitarian projects which are independent of its missionary efforts.

== History ==
=== Beginnings ===
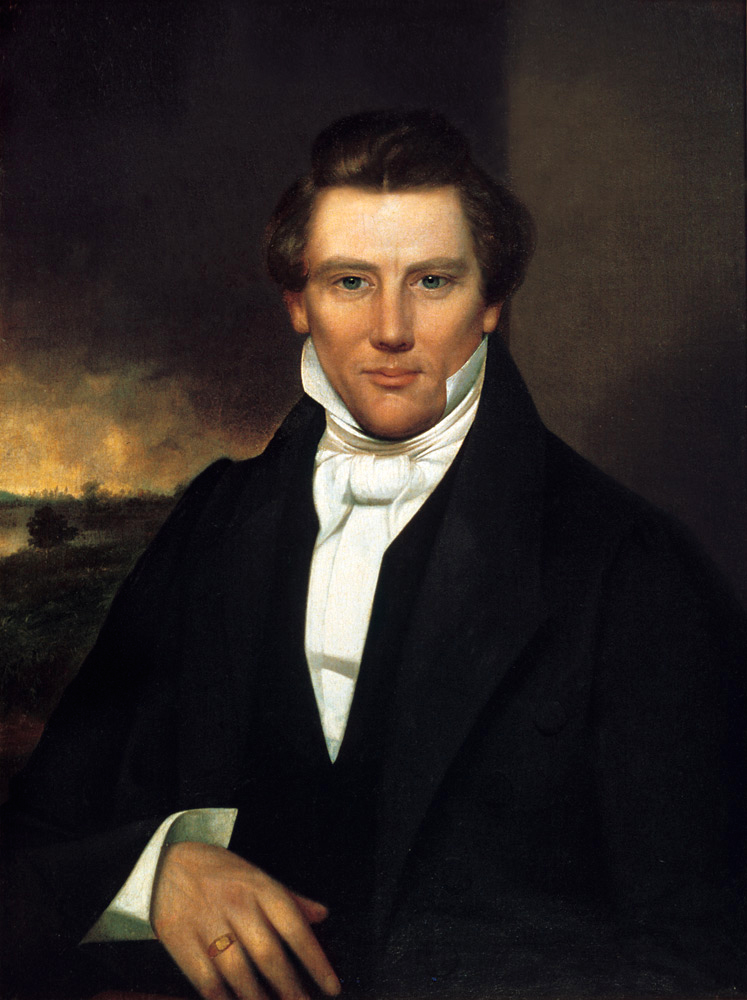
Joseph Smith, the first president of the Church of Christ

Joseph Smith formally organized the church as the Church of Christ, on April 6, 1830, in western New York; (Note: Scholars and eyewitnesses disagree whether the church was organized in Manchester, New York at the Smith log home, or in Fayette at the home of Peter Whitmer; Marquardt states that organization in Manchester is most consistent with eye-witness statements. The LDS Church officially favors organization in Fayette.) the church's name was later changed to the Church of Jesus Christ of Latter Day Saints. Initial converts were drawn to the church in part because of the newly published Book of Mormon, a self-described chronicle of Indigenous American prophets that Smith said he had translated from golden plates.

Smith intended to establish the New Jerusalem in North America, called Zion. In 1831, the church moved to Kirtland, Ohio, (Note: In 1834, Smith designated Kirtland as one of the "stakes" of Zion, referring to the tent–stakes metaphor of Isaiah.) and began establishing an outpost in Jackson County, Missouri, where Smith planned to eventually move the church headquarters. (Note: Smith said in 1831 that God intended the Mormons to "retain a strong hold in the land of Kirtland, for the space of five years".) However, in 1833, Missouri settlers violently expelled the Latter Day Saints from Jackson County. (Note: Brodie stated that the brutality of the Jackson Countians aroused sympathy for the Mormons and was almost universally deplored by the media.) The church attempted to recover the land through a paramilitary expedition, but did not succeed. Nevertheless, the church flourished in Kirtland as Smith published new revelations and the church built the Kirtland Temple, (Note: By summer of 1835, there were 1500 to 2000 Saints in Kirtland, and from 1831 to 1838, church membership grew from 680 to 17,881.) culminating in a dedication of the building similar to the day of Pentecost. The Kirtland era ended in 1838, after a financial scandal rocked the church and caused widespread defections. Smith regrouped with the remaining church in Far West, Missouri, (Note: Smith referred to the Far West church as the "church in Zion". His statement calling Far West "Zion" had the effect of "implying that Far West was to take the place of Independence".) but tensions soon escalated into violent conflicts with the Missouri settlers. Believing the Latter Day Saints to be an insurrection, the Missouri governor ordered that they be "exterminated or driven from the State". (Note: Boggs' executive order stated that the Mormon community had "made war upon the people of this State" and that "the Mormons must be treated as enemies, and must be exterminated or driven from the State if necessary for the public peace". In 1976, Missouri issued a formal apology for this unconstitutional order.) In 1839, the Latter Day Saints converted a swampland on the banks of the Mississippi River into Nauvoo, Illinois, which became the church's new headquarters.

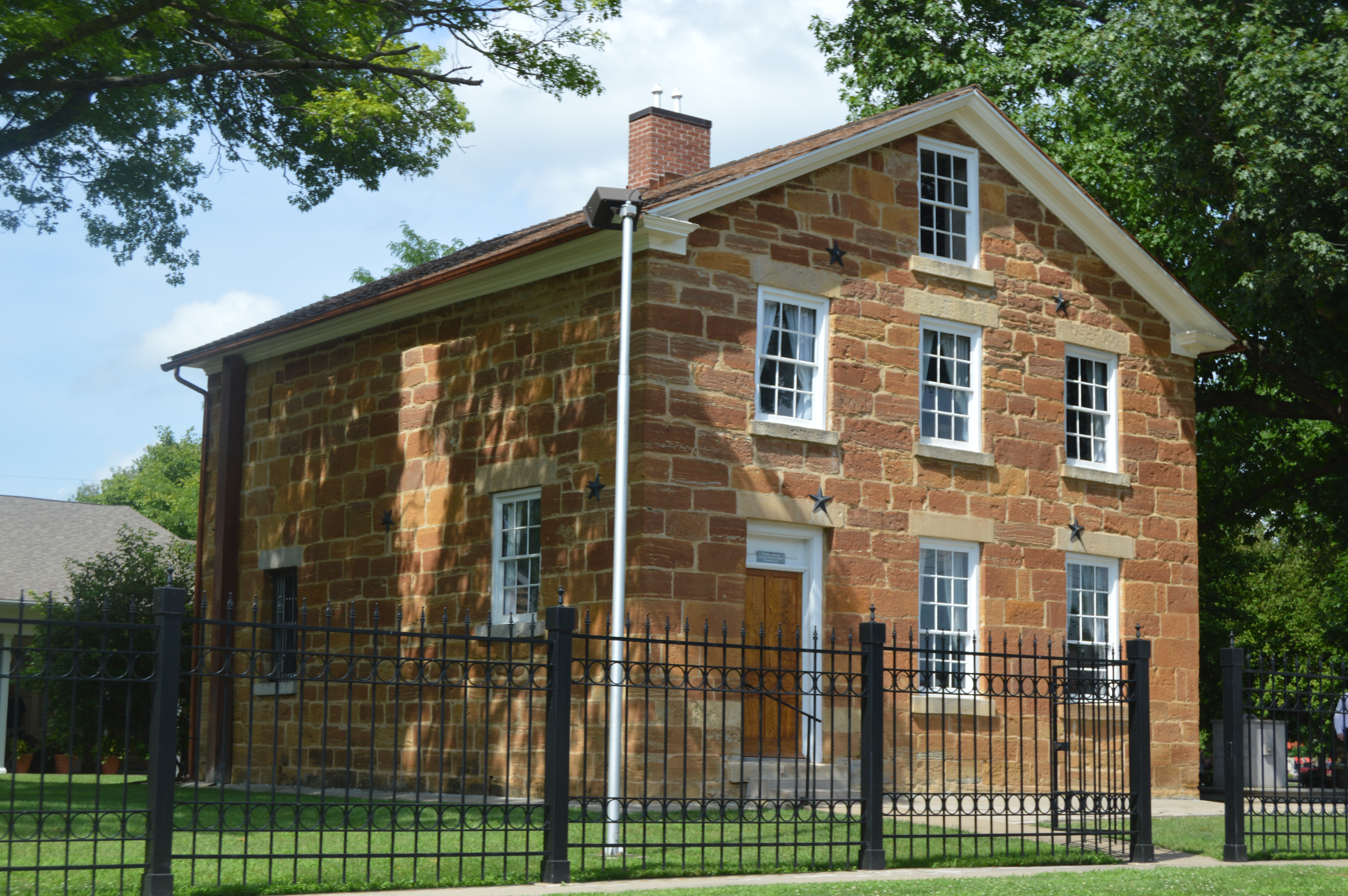
Carthage Jail, where Joseph Smith was killed in 1844

Nauvoo grew rapidly as missionaries sent to Europe and elsewhere gained new converts who flooded into Nauvoo. Meanwhile, Smith introduced polygamy to his closest associates. He also established ceremonies, which he stated the Lord had revealed to him, to allow righteous people to become gods in the afterlife, (Note: The second anointing ordinance provides a guarantee that recipients will be exalted. Authors have stated that Smith's words were similar to those of Paul that faithful saints may become co-heirs with Jesus.) and a secular institution to govern the Millennial kingdom. (Note: Bushman described the Council of Fifty noting that Smith prophesied "the entire overthrow of this nation in a few years", at which time the Kingdom of God would be prepared to lead.) He also introduced the church to a full accounting of his First Vision, in which he claimed that two heavenly "personages" appeared to him at age 14. (Note: In this account, the personages in question are inferred—though never expressly stated—to be God the Father and his Son, Jesus Christ.) This vision would come to be regarded by the LDS Church as the most important event in human history since the resurrection of Jesus.

On June 27, 1844, Smith and his brother, Hyrum, were killed by a mob in Carthage, Illinois, while being held on charges of treason. Because Hyrum was Joseph's designated successor, their deaths caused a succession crisis, and Brigham Young assumed leadership over a majority of the church's membership.

Other splinter groups followed other leaders around this time. These groups have no affiliation with the LDS Church, however they share a common heritage in their early church history. Collectively, they are called the Latter Day Saint movement. The largest of these smaller groups is the Community of Christ, based in Independence, Missouri, followed by the Church of Jesus Christ, based in Monongahela, Pennsylvania. Like the LDS Church, these faiths believe in Joseph Smith as a prophet and founder of their religion. They also accept the Book of Mormon, and most accept at least some version of the Doctrine and Covenants. However, they tend to disagree to varying degrees with the LDS Church concerning doctrine and church leadership.

=== Pioneer era ===
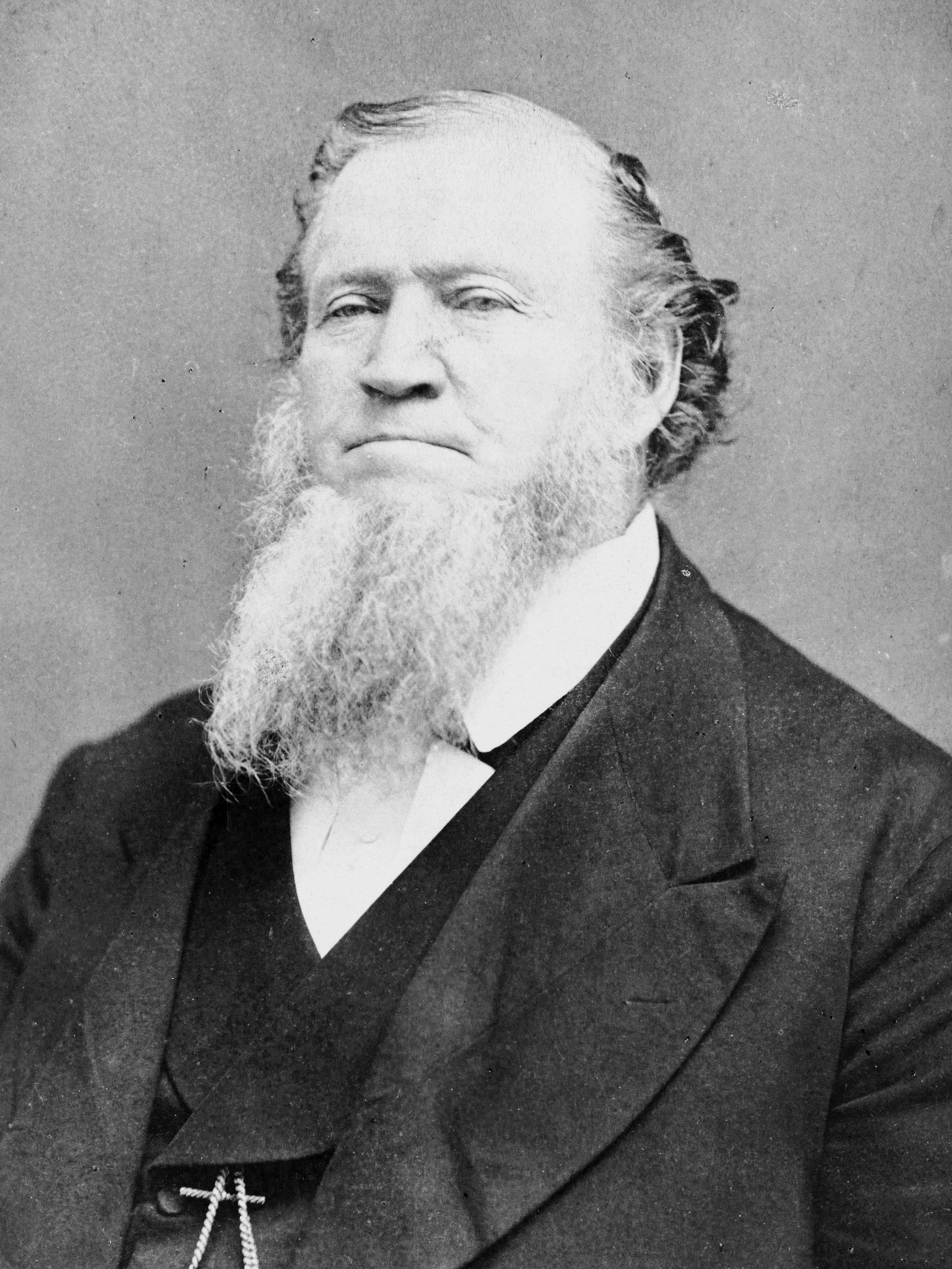
Brigham Young led the LDS Church from 1844 until his death in 1877.

For two years after Smith's death, conflicts escalated between Mormons and other Illinois residents. Brigham Young led his followers, later called the Mormon pioneers, westward to Nebraska and then in 1847 on to what later became the Utah Territory, which at the time had been part of the lands of the Ute, Goshute, and Shoshone nations, and claimed by Mexico until 1848. Around 80,000 settlers arrived between 1847 and 1869, who then branched out and colonized a large region now known as the Mormon Corridor. Meanwhile, efforts to globalize the church began in earnest around this time, with missionaries being sent off to the Sandwich Islands (present-day Hawaii), India, Chile, Australia, China, South Africa, and all over Europe.

Young incorporated the LDS Church as a legal entity, and initially governed both the church and the state as a theocratic leader. He also publicized the practice of plural marriage in 1852. Modern research suggests that around 20 percent of Mormon families may have participated in the practice.

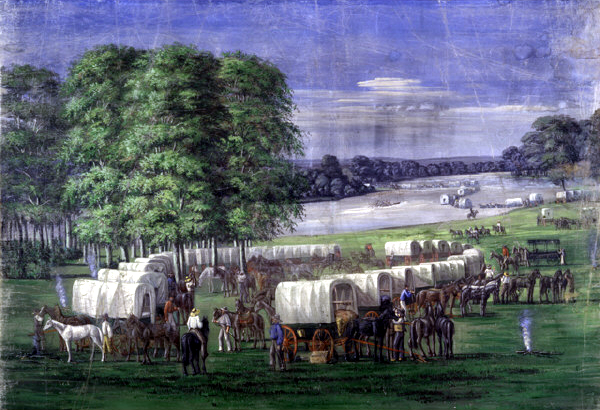
19th-century painting of Mormon pioneers crossing the plains of Nebraska

By 1857, tensions had again escalated between Mormons and other Americans, largely as a result of accusations involving polygamy and the theocratic rule of the Utah Territory by Young. The Utah Mormon War ensued from 1857 to 1858, which resulted in the relatively peaceful invasion of Utah by the United States Army. The most notable instance of Mormon violence during this conflict was the Mountain Meadows massacre, in which leaders of a local Mormon militia ordered the massacre of a civilian emigrant party who was traveling through Utah during the escalating military tensions. After the massacre was discovered, the church became the target of significant media criticism for it.

After the Army withdrew, Young agreed to step down from power and be replaced by a non-Mormon territorial governor, Alfred Cumming. Nevertheless, the LDS Church still wielded significant political power in the Utah Territory. Coterminously, tensions between Mormon settlers and Indigenous tribes continued to escalate as settlers began colonizing a growing area of tribal lands. While Mormons and Indigenous peoples made attempts at peaceful coexistence, skirmishes ensued from about 1849 to 1873 culminating in the armed conflicts of Wakara's War, the Bear River Massacre, and the Black Hawk War.

After Young's death in 1877, he was followed in the church presidency by John Taylor and Wilford Woodruff successively, who resisted efforts by the United States Congress to outlaw Mormon polygamous marriages. In 1878, the United States Supreme Court, in Reynolds v. United States, decreed that "religious duty" to engage in plural marriage was not a valid defense to prosecutions for violating state laws against polygamy. Conflict between Mormons and the U.S. government escalated to the point that, in 1890, Congress disincorporated the LDS Church and seized most of its assets. Soon thereafter, Woodruff issued a manifesto that officially suspended the performance of new polygamous marriages in the United States. Relations with the United States markedly improved after 1890, such that Utah was admitted as a U.S. state in 1896. Relations further improved after 1904, when church president Joseph F. Smith again disavowed polygamy before the United States Congress and issued a "Second Manifesto", calling for all plural marriages in the church to cease. Eventually, the church adopted a policy of excommunicating its members found practicing polygamy. Some fundamentalist groups with relatively small memberships have broken off and continue to practice polygamy, but the Church distances itself from them.

=== Modern times ===
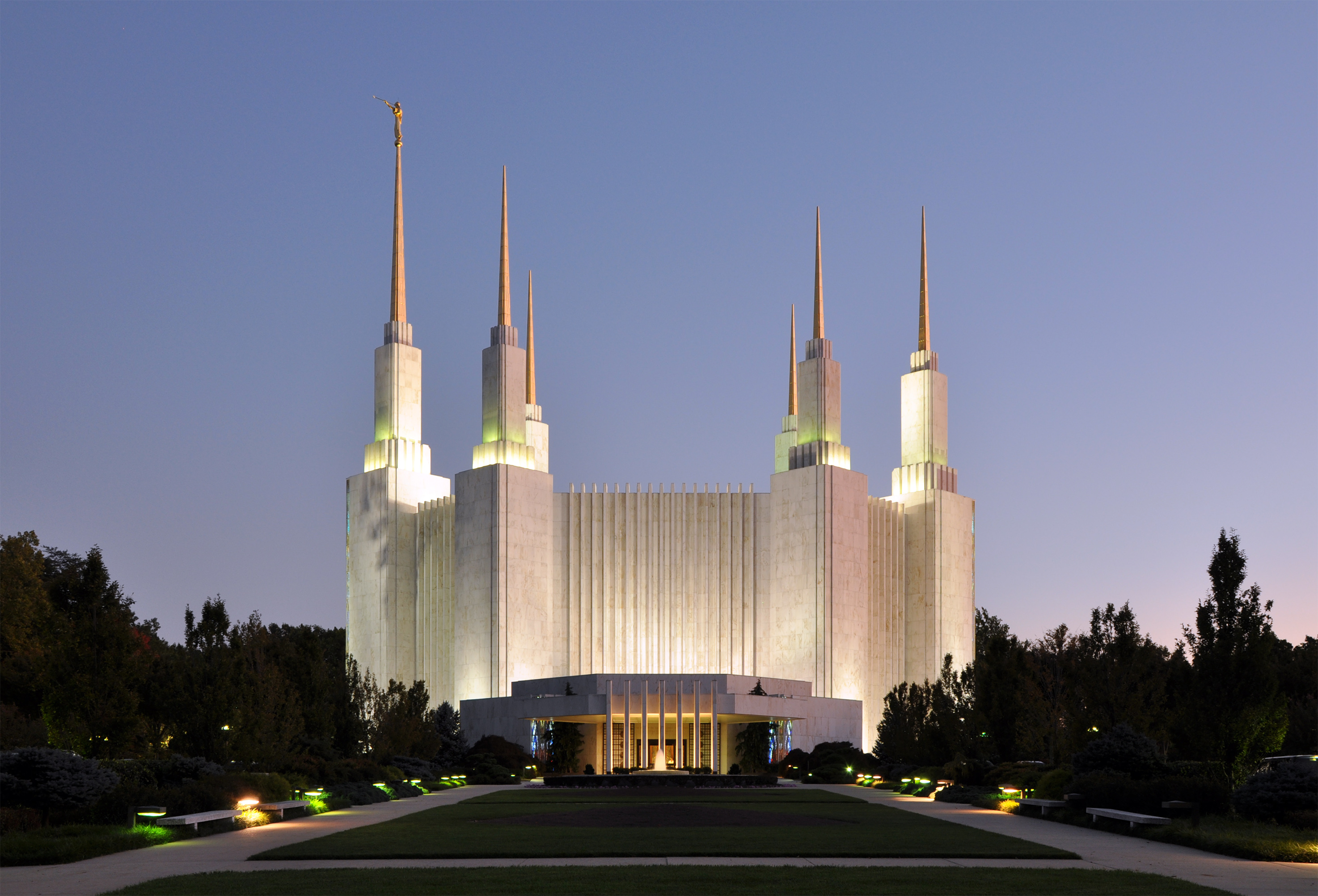
Completed in 1974, the Washington D.C. Temple was the first built in the eastern half of the United States since 1846.

During the 20th century, the church grew substantially and became an international organization. In 2000, the church reported over 60,000 missionaries and global church membership stood at just over 11 million. Nominal worldwide membership surpassed 16 million in 2018. Slightly under half of church membership lives within the U.S. Academics have called the denomination a Restorationist church, a new religious movement, and a potential world religion.

The church has become a strong proponent of the nuclear family. At times, it has also played a prominent role in political matters; examples include opposition to MX Peacekeeper missile bases in Utah and Nevada, the Equal Rights Amendment, legalized gambling, same-sex marriage, and physician-assisted death.

A number of official changes have taken place to the organization during the modern era. In 1978, the church reversed its previous policy of excluding Black men of African descent from the priesthood, which had been in place since 1852; members of all races can now be ordained to the priesthood. Also, since the early 1900s, the church has instituted a Priesthood Correlation Program to centralize church operations and bring them under a hierarchy of priesthood leaders. During the Great Depression, the church also began operating a church welfare system; it has also conducted humanitarian efforts in cooperation with other religious organizations such as Catholic Relief Services, as well as secular organizations like Care International. From 1913 to 2020 the church was a major sponsor of Scouting programs for boys, particularly in the United States. The LDS Church was the largest chartered organization in the Boy Scouts of America. However, in 2020, the church ended its relationship with the BSA and began an alternate, religion-centered youth program, which replaced all other youth programs.

During the second half of the 20th century and early 21st, the church has responded to various challenges to its doctrine and authority. Challenges have included rising secularization, challenges to the correctness of the translation of the Book of Abraham, and primary documents forged by Mark Hofmann purporting to contradict important aspects of official early church history. The church and its members have also experienced prejudice and violence, including a shooting in Grand Blanc, Michigan, on September 28, 2025, that left four members dead.

== Beliefs ==
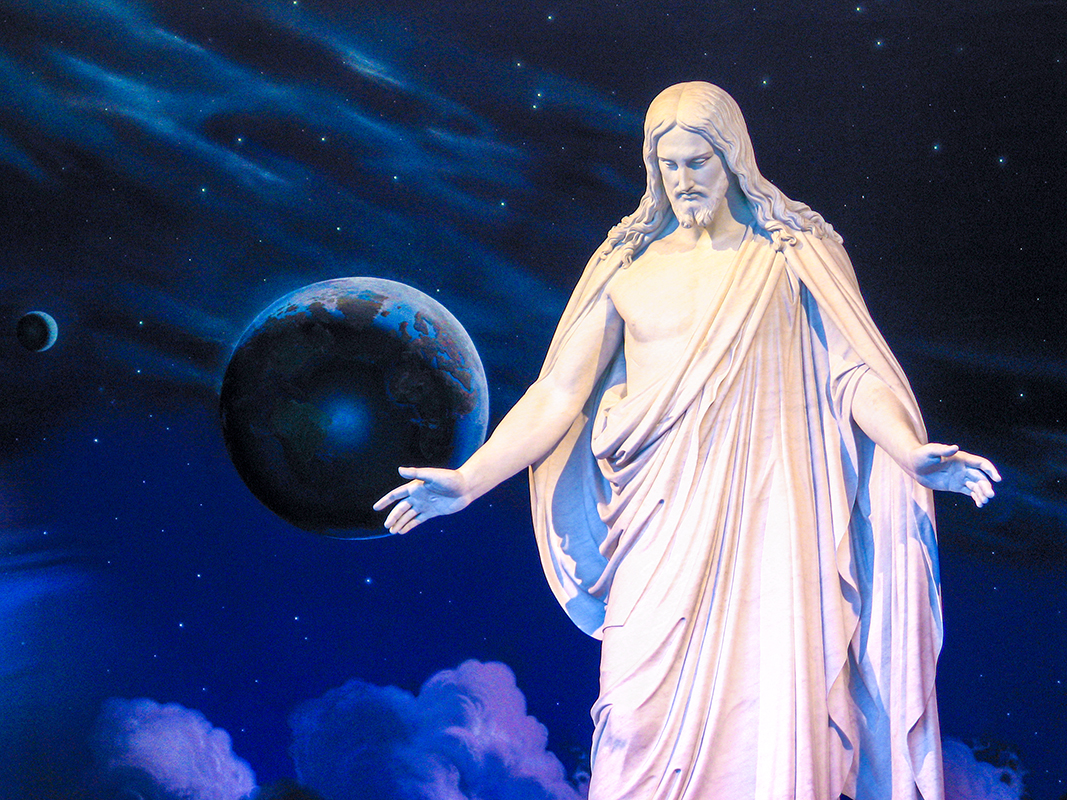
Latter-day Saints believe in the resurrection of Jesus, as depicted in this replica of Bertel Thorvaldsen's Christus statue located in the North Visitors' Center on Temple Square in Salt Lake City.

=== Nature of God ===
LDS Church theology includes the belief in a Godhead composed of God the Father, his son, Jesus, who Latter-day Saints believe to be the Christ, and the Holy Ghost as three separate persons who share a unity of purpose or will; however, they are viewed as three distinct beings. This is in contrast with the predominant Christian view, which holds that God is a Trinity of three distinct persons in one essence. The Latter-day Saint conception of the Godhead is similar to what contemporary Christian theologians call social trinitarianism. The church also believes that God the Father and his son, Jesus Christ, are separate beings with bodies of flesh and bone, while the Holy Ghost lacks such a physical body.

According to statements by church leaders, God sits at the head of the human family and is married to a Heavenly Mother, who is the mother of human spirits. However, church leaders have also categorically discouraged prayers to her and counseled against speculation regarding her.

=== Jesus Christ ===
Church members believe in Jesus Christ as the literal Son of God and Messiah, his crucifixion as a conclusion of a sin offering, and his subsequent resurrection. However, Latter-day Saints reject the ecumenical creeds and the definition of the Trinity. Jesus is also seen as the elder brother of all who live in this world. The church teaches that Jesus performed a substitutionary atonement. In contrast with other Christian denominations, the church teaches this atonement began in the garden of Gethsemane and continued to his crucifixion (rather than the orthodox belief that the crucifixion alone was the physical atonement). The church also teaches that Jesus appeared to other peoples after his death, including spirits of the dead in the spirit world, and Indigenous Americans.

The church also teaches that Jesus is the true founder and leader of the church itself. The physical establishment of the church by Smith in 1830 is seen as simply the reestablishment of the same primitive church that existed under Jesus and his Apostles. Similarly, the church teaches that Jesus leads the church presently through its apostles and prophets, especially its current president.

==== Comparison with Nicene Christianity ====
The LDS Church shares various teachings with other branches of Christianity. These include a belief in the Bible, the divinity of Jesus, his atonement and resurrection, and a form of apostolic succession. (Note: However, the Catholic Church considers doctrinal differences between the two groups to be so great that it will not accept a prior LDS baptism as evidence of Christian initiation, as it will baptism by other Christian groups, such as the Eastern Orthodox and Protestant churches. The LDS Church, in its turn, does not accept baptisms performed in any other churches, as it teaches that baptism is only valid when it is conducted through proper priesthood authority.)

The LDS Church differs from other churches within contemporary Christianity in other ways. Differences between the LDS Church and most of traditional Christianity include disagreement about the nature of God, belief in a theory of human salvation that includes three heavens, a doctrine of exaltation which includes the ability of humans to become gods and goddesses in the afterlife, a belief in continuing revelation and an open scriptural canon, and unique ceremonies performed privately in temples, such as the endowment and sealing ceremonies. A number of major Christian denominations view the LDS Church as standing apart from creedal Christianity. (Note: Examples include the Catholic Church, Eastern Orthodox Church, U.S. Presbyterian Church, US Evangelical Lutheran Church, and the U.S. Episcopal Church.) However, church members self-identify as Christians.

The faith itself views other modern Christian faiths as having departed from true Christianity by way of a general apostasy and maintains that it is a restoration of 1st-century Christianity and the only true and authorized Christian church. Church leaders assert it is the only true church and that other churches do not have the authority to act in Jesus' name. (Note: According to Joseph Smith, Jesus told him that the other churches claiming to be Christian creeds "were an abomination in the Lords sight; that those professors [of religion] were all corrupt".)

=== Cosmology and plan of salvation ===
The church's cosmology and plan of salvation include the doctrines of a pre-existence, an earthly mortal existence, three degrees of heaven and exaltation.

According to these doctrines, every human spirit is a spiritual child of a Heavenly Father and each has the potential to continue to learn, grow, and progress in the eternities, eventually achieving eternal life, which is to become one with God in the same way that Jesus Christ is one with the Father, thus allowing the children of God to become divine beings—that is, gods—themselves. This view on the doctrine of theosis is also referred to as becoming a "joint-heir with Christ". The process by which this is accomplished is called exaltation, a doctrine which includes the reunification of the mortal family after the resurrection and the ability to have spirit children in the afterlife and inherit a portion of God's kingdom.

According to LDS Church theology, men and women may be sealed to one another so that their marital bond continues into the eternities. (Note: A man may be sealed to more than one wife if his previous wives are either dead or legally divorced from him; a living woman, however, may only be sealed to one husband. Thus, there is a common view within the LDS Church that though prohibited by the LDS Church in mortality, polygamy or "plural marriage" will exist in the afterlife. "In the case of a man marrying a wife in the everlasting covenant who dies while he continues in the flesh and marries another by the same divine law, each wife will come forth in her order and enter with him into his glory." Joseph Fielding Smith, then an apostle, stated in 1939 "my wives will be mine in eternity" in reference to his two deceased and one living partners.) Children may also be sealed to their biological or adoptive parents to form permanent familial bonds, thus allowing all immediate and extended family relations to endure past death. (Note: Children born to biological parents who have been sealed to each other are considered "born in the covenant" and need not be sealed to their parents.) The most significant LDS ordinances may be performed via proxy in behalf of those who have died, such as baptism for the dead. The church teaches that all will have the opportunity to hear and accept or reject the gospel of Jesus Christ, either in this life or the next.

Within church cosmology, the fall of Adam and Eve is seen positively. The church teaches that it was essential to allow humankind to experience separation from God, to exercise full agency in making decisions for their own happiness. The church teaches that the Garden of Eden was located in Jackson County, Missouri.

=== Restorationism ===
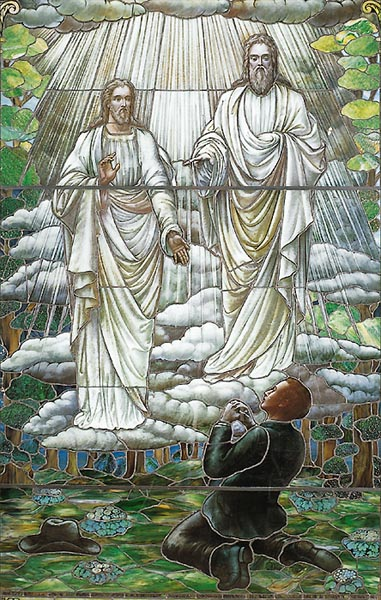
Adherents believe that Joseph Smith was called to be a modern-day prophet through a visitation from God the Father and Jesus Christ.

The LDS Church teaches that, subsequent to the death of Jesus and his original apostles, his church, along with the authority to act in Jesus Christ's name and the church's attendant spiritual gifts, were lost, due to a combination of external persecutions and internal heresies. The "Restoration"—as begun by Joseph Smith and embodied in the church itself—refers to a return of the authentic priesthood power, spiritual gifts, ordinances, living prophets and revelation of the primitive Church of Christ. This restoration is associated with a number of events which are understood to have been necessary to re-establish the early Christian church found in the New Testament, and to prepare the earth for the Second Coming of Jesus.

=== Leadership ===
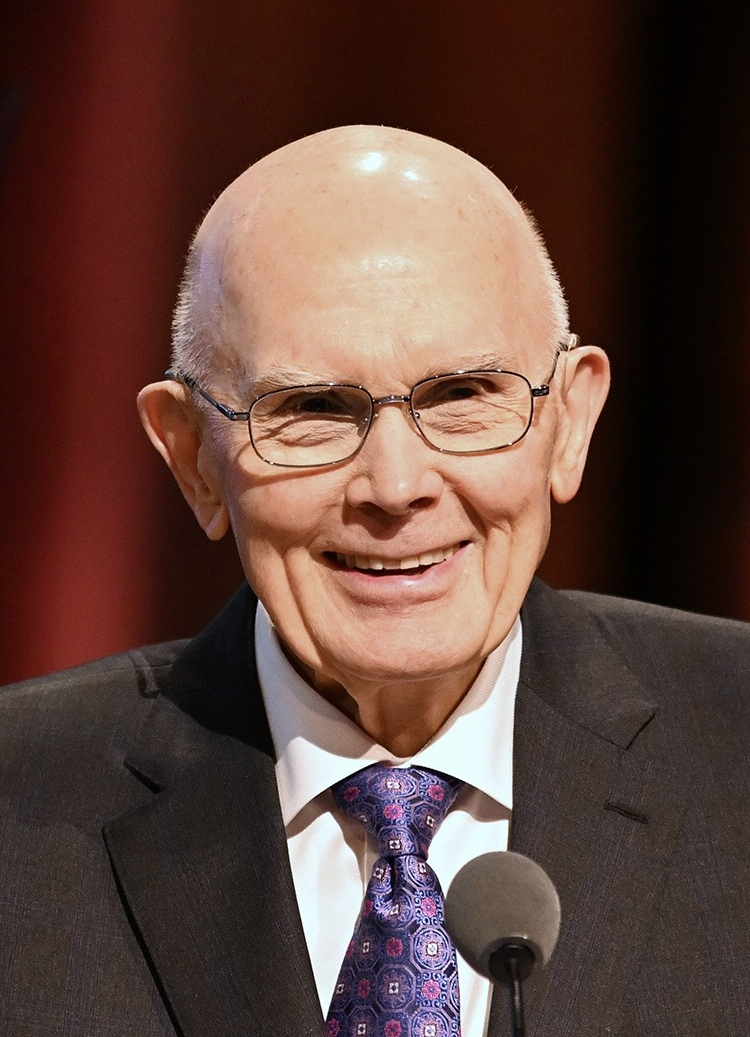
Dallin H. Oaks, president of the church

The church is led by a president. Within the church, he is referred to as "the Prophet". He is considered to be a "prophet, seer and revelator", and is the only person who is authorized to receive revelation from God on behalf of the whole world or entire church. As such, the church teaches that he is essentially infallible when speaking on behalf of God—although the exact circumstances when his pronouncements should be considered authoritative are debated within the church. In any case, modern declarations with broad doctrinal implications are often issued by joint statement of the First Presidency; they may be joined by the Quorum of the Twelve Apostles as well. Church members believe Joseph Smith was the first modern-day prophet. Following the death of church president Russell M. Nelson, senior apostle Dallin H. Oaks was announced as president on October 14, 2025.

Normally, the president chooses two other ordained apostles as counselors, and together they form the First Presidency, the presiding body of the church. Twelve other apostles form the Quorum of the Twelve Apostles. When a president dies, his successor is chosen from the remaining apostles. By longstanding convention, the longest-tenured apostle becomes the next president of the church. In recent years, this process has contributed to the church's leadership being of increasingly advanced age, given that apostles serve for life.

New apostles are chosen by the church president after the death of an existing apostle. The First Presidency, the Quorum of the Twelve Apostles, first two Quorums of Seventy and the Presiding Bishopric make up the general authorities of the church. The general presidencies of the church-wide Relief Society, Sunday School, Young Women, Young Men, and Primary organizations make up the general officers of the church. Women serve as presidents and counselors in the presidencies of the Relief Society, Young Women, and Primary, while men serve as presidents and counselors of the Sunday School and Young Men.

=== Home and family ===
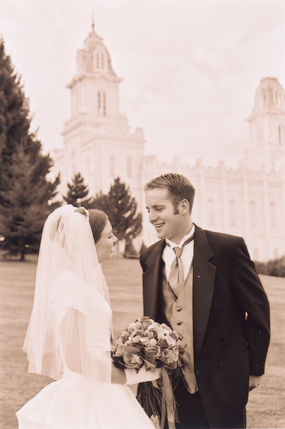
A couple after their marriage in the Manti Utah Temple. The church teaches that marriages, or sealings, performed in their temples may continue after death.

The church and its members consider marriage and family highly important, emphasizing large, nuclear families. In 1995, the church's First Presidency and Quorum of the Twelve issued "The Family: A Proclamation to the World", which asserts the importance of a heterosexual, nuclear family. The proclamation defined marriage as a union between one man and one woman and stated that the family unit is "central to the Creator's plan for the eternal destiny of His children." The document further says that "gender is an essential characteristic of individual premortal, mortal, and eternal identity and purpose," that the father and mother have differing roles as "equal partners" in raising children, that "children are entitled to birth within the bonds of matrimony", and that successful marriages and happy families are most likely established when founded upon the teachings of Jesus Christ. The proclamation also promotes specific roles essential to maintaining the strength of the family unit—the traditional roles of a husband and father as the family's breadwinner and those of a wife and mother as a nurturing caregiver. Senior church leaders have continued to emphasize conservative teachings on marriage and gender to the present time.

LDS Church members are encouraged to set aside one evening each week, typically Monday, to spend together in "Family Home Evening" (FHE), which typically consists of gathering as a family to study the faith's gospel principles, and other family activities. Daily family prayer is also encouraged.

=== Sources of doctrine ===
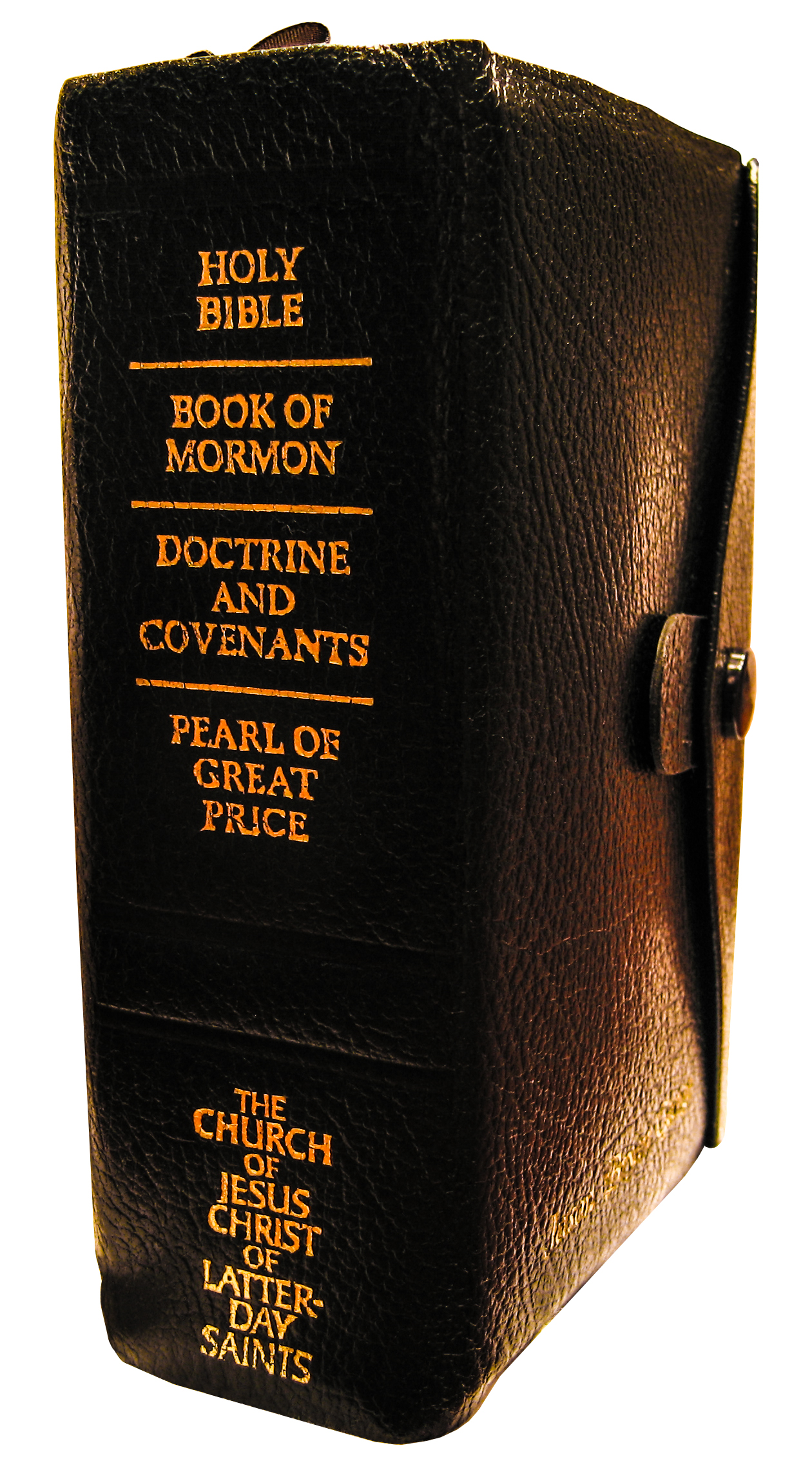
The written canon of the church is referred to as its standard works.

The theology of the LDS Church consists of a combination of biblical doctrines with modern revelations and other commentary by LDS leaders, particularly Joseph Smith. The most authoritative sources of theology are the faith's canon of four religious texts, called the "standard works". Included in the standard works are the Bible, the Book of Mormon, the D&C and the Pearl of Great Price.

The Book of Mormon is a foundational sacred book for the church; the terms "Mormon" and "Mormonism" come from the name of the book itself. The LDS Church teaches that the Angel Moroni told Smith about golden plates containing the record, guided him to find them buried in the Hill Cumorah, and provided him the means of translating them from Reformed Egyptian. It claims to give a history of the inhabitants from a now-extinct society living on the American continent and their distinct Judeo-Christian teachings. The Book of Mormon is very important to modern Latter-day Saints, who consider it the world's most correct text.

The Bible, also part of the church's canon, is believed to be the word of God—subject to an acknowledgment that its translation may be incorrect, or that authoritative sections may have been lost over the centuries. Most often, the church uses the Authorized King James Version. Two extended portions of the Joseph Smith Translation of the Bible have been canonized and are thus considered authoritative. (Note: Joseph Smith–Matthew and the Book of Moses, containing translations and revelatory expansions of Matthew 24 and Genesis 1–7, respectively, are contained in the Pearl of Great Price.) Additionally, over 600 of the more doctrinally significant verses from the translation are included as excerpts in the current LDS Church edition of the Bible. Other revelations from Smith are found in the D&C, and in the Pearl of Great Price. Another source of authoritative doctrine is the pronouncements of the current Apostles and members of the First Presidency. The church teaches that the First Presidency and the Quorum of Twelve Apostles are prophets and that they are therefore authorized teachers of God's word.

In addition to doctrine given by the church as a whole, individual members of the church believe that they can also receive personal revelation from God in conducting their lives, and in revealing truth to them, especially about spiritual matters. Generally, this is said to occur through thoughts and feelings from the Holy Ghost, in response to prayer. Similarly, the church teaches its members may receive individual guidance and counsel from God through blessings from priesthood holders. In particular, patriarchal blessings are considered special blessings that are received only once in the recipient's life, which are recorded, transcribed, and archived.

== Practices ==
=== Rituals ===
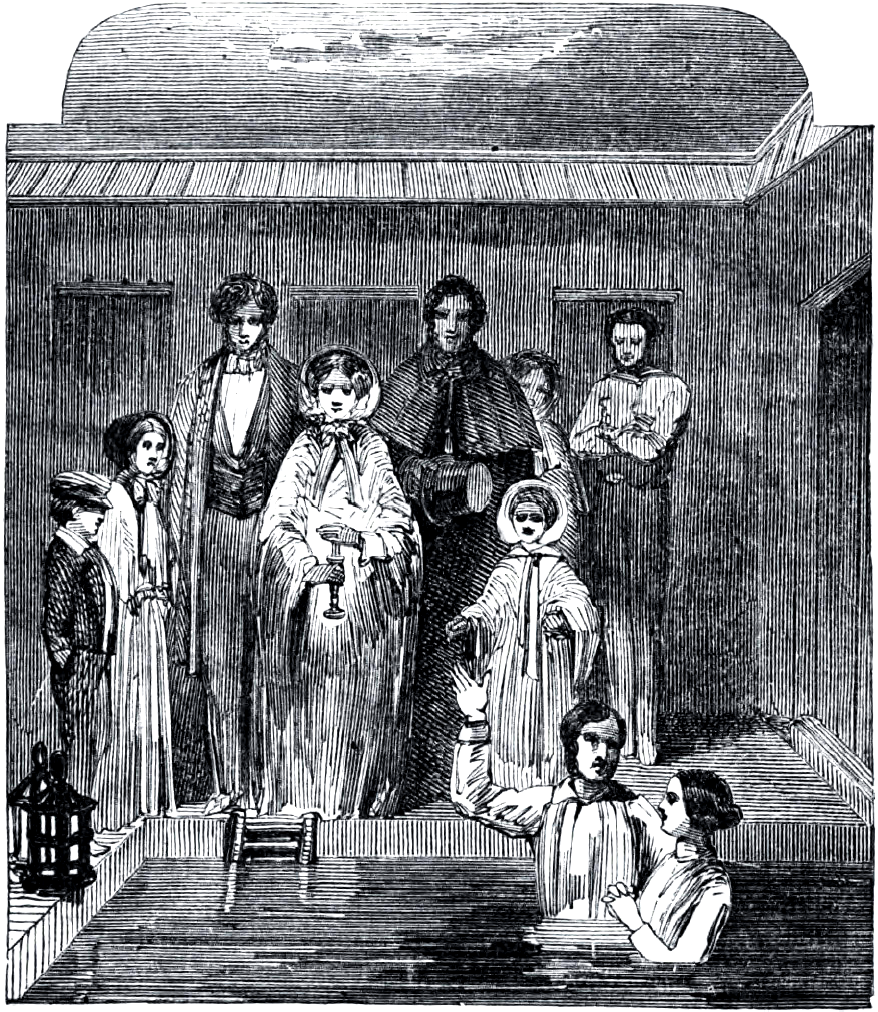
Baptism by immersion is considered highly important in the LDS Church. This depiction from circa 1850 shows the all-white clothing used in the ordinance.

In the church, an ordinance is a sacred rite or ceremony that has spiritual and symbolic meanings, and is performed under priesthood authority. For some ordinances, the act is tied to a covenant between the ordinance recipient and God.

The ordinance of baptism is believed to bind its participant to Jesus Christ, who saves them in their imperfection if they continually keep their promises to him. Baptism is performed by immersion, and is typically administered to children starting at age eight.

Church members believe that through the ordinances of temple sealing and temple endowment, anyone can reach the highest level of salvation in the celestial kingdom and eternally live in God's presence, continue as families, become gods, create worlds, and make spirit children over whom they will govern.

Other ordinances performed in the church include confirmation, the sacrament (analogous to the Eucharist or holy communion), priesthood ordination, patriarchal blessing, anointing of the sick, and priesthood blessings.

=== Diet and health ===
The LDS Church asks its members to adhere to a dietary code called the Word of Wisdom, in which they abstain from the consumption of alcohol, coffee, tea, tobacco, and illicit or harmful substances. The Word of Wisdom also encourages the consumption of herbs and grains along with the moderate consumption of meat.

When Joseph Smith published the Word of Wisdom in 1833, it was considered only advice; violation did not restrict church membership. During the 1890s, though, church leaders started emphasizing the Word of Wisdom more. In 1921, church president Heber J. Grant made obeying the Word of Wisdom a requirement to engage in worship inside of the faith's temples. From that time, church leadership has emphasized the forbidding of coffee, tea, tobacco, and alcohol, but not the other guidelines concerning meat, grains, and herbs. In 2019, the church further clarified that the usage of marijuana and opioids is prohibited except as prescribed by a competent physician for medical purposes.

Church members generally fast - that is, abstain from food and drink - for two consecutive meals in a 24-hour period, on the first Sunday of each month. Members are invited to donate the money they would have used for those meals to assist others in need (called a fast offering).

=== Sexuality ===
Church members are expected to follow a moral code called the law of chastity, which prohibits adultery, homosexual behavior, and sexual relations before or outside of marriage. As part of the law of chastity, the church strongly opposes pornography, and considers masturbation an immoral act. Law of chastity violations can be grounds for church discipline; resulting penalties may include having access to the temple and sacrament revoked. The church discourages romantic dating until around the age of 16.

=== Tithing and other donations ===
Church members are expected to donate one-tenth of their income to support the operations of the church. After initially relying on a communal lifestyle known as the law of consecration throughout most of the 1830s, the church created the law of tithing in July 1838 when the membership was concentrated in Missouri. Church members would frequently tithe by giving ten percent of their livestock and produce; nowadays donations are generally done with money.

Annual donations were estimated to total US$7 billion to $33 billion donated in 2012 (equivalent to US$9.8 billion to US$46.3 billion in 2025). To qualify for participation in temple ordinances (which Latter-day Saints believe are necessary for their exaltation), paying a full tithe is a requirement, regardless of one's temporal circumstances. Members are also encouraged to fast (abstain from food and drink) on the first Sunday of each month for a 24-hour period. They donate at least the cost of the skipped meals of the fast as a "fast offering", which the church uses to assist people in need and expand its humanitarian efforts.

Local leadership is not paid, and is expected to tithe as well. Full-time missionaries, however, are not expected to pay tithing as they are usually paying to be a missionary.

=== Missionary service ===
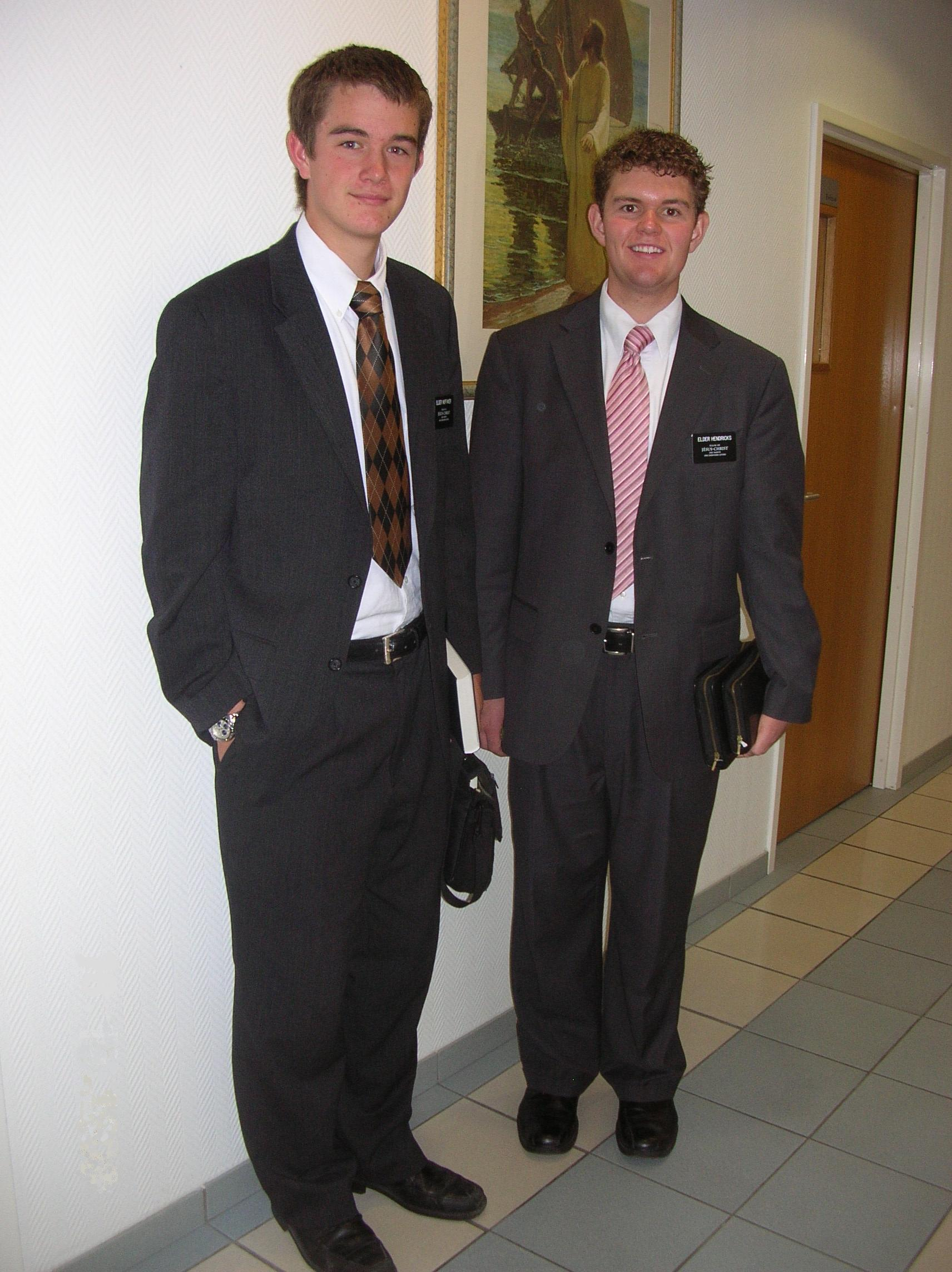
Missionaries typically commit to 18–24 months of full-time service.

All able-bodied LDS young men are expected to serve a two-year, full-time proselytizing mission. Missionaries do not choose where they serve or the language in which they will proselytize, and are expected to fund their missions themselves or with the aid of their families. Prospective male missionaries must be between the ages of 18 and 25 and have completed secondary school. All proselytizing missionaries are organized geographically into administrative areas called missions. The efforts in each mission are directed by an older adult male mission president. As of July 2026, there will be 506 missions of the LDS Church.

Although missionary service is expected for men, it is not compulsory and is not a requirement for retaining church membership. Unmarried women between the ages of 18 and 29 may also serve as missionaries, generally for a term of 18 months. Retired couples and single men over the age of 40 are also encouraged to serve missions, with terms ranging from six to 23 months. Unlike younger missionaries, these senior missionaries may serve in non-proselytizing capacities such as humanitarian aid workers or family history specialists. Other men and women who wish to serve a mission but are unable to perform full-time service in another state or country due to health issues, may serve in a non-proselytizing mission. They might assist at Temple Square in Salt Lake City or aid in the seminary system in schools.

=== Sabbath day observance ===
Church members are expected to set aside Sundays as a day of rest and worship. Typically, weekly worship meetings occur solely on Sundays. Shopping and recreation are discouraged on Sundays as well.

== Worship and meetings ==
=== Weekly meetings ===
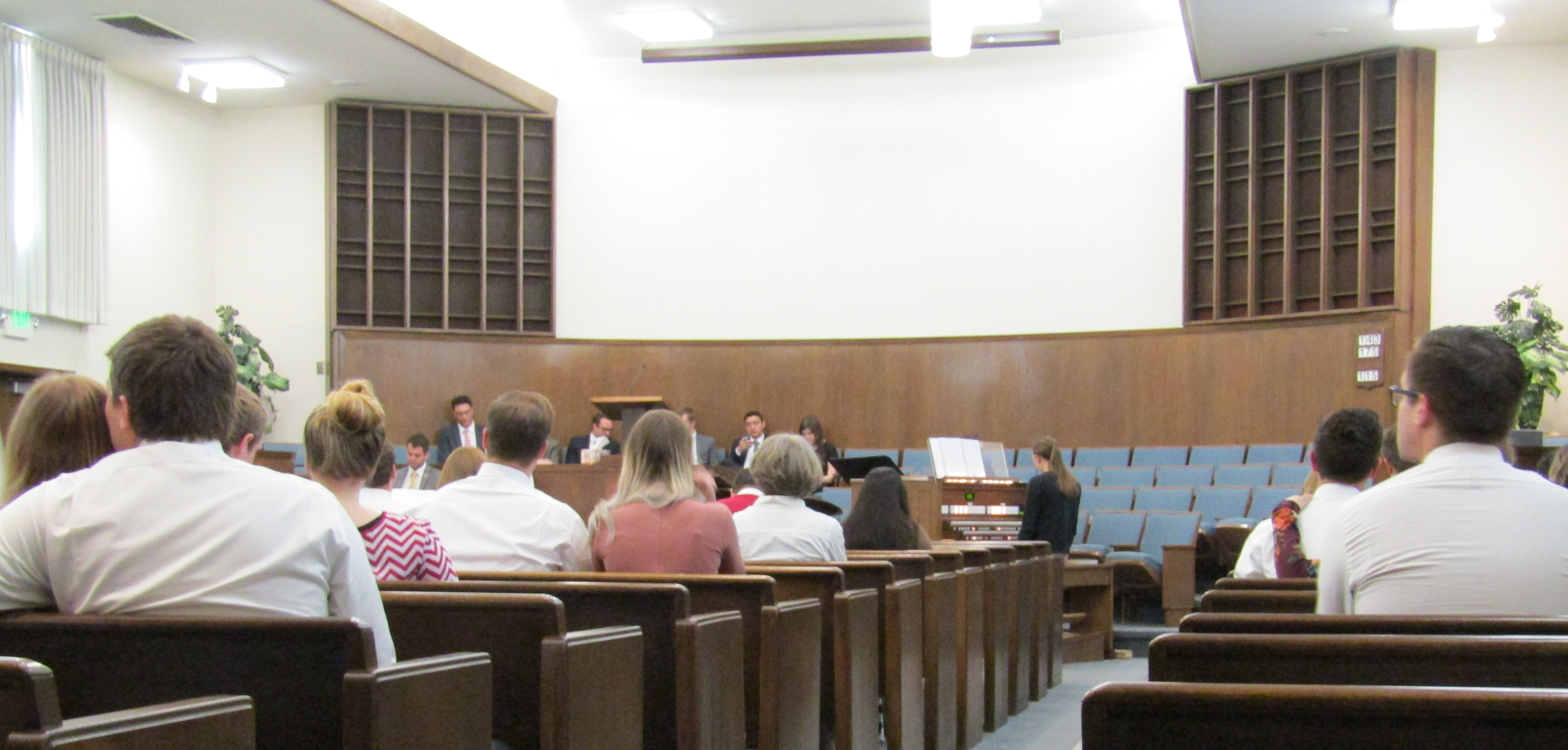
Interior view of a typical weekly Sunday sacrament meeting in Provo, Utah

Meetings for worship and study are held at meetinghouses, which are typically utilitarian in character. The main focus of Sunday worship is the Sacrament meeting, where the sacrament is passed to church members; sacrament meetings also include prayers, the singing of hymns by the congregation or choir, and impromptu or planned sermons by church members. Also included in weekly meetings are times for Sunday School, or separate instructional meetings based on age and gender, including the Relief Society for women.

Church congregations are organized geographically. Members are generally expected to attend the congregation within their assigned geographical area; however, some geographical areas also provide separate congregations for young single adults, older single adults, or for speakers of alternate languages. For Sunday services, the church is grouped into either larger congregations known as wards, or smaller congregations known as branches. Regional church organizations, encompassing multiple congregations, include stakes, missions, districts and areas.

=== Temple worship ===
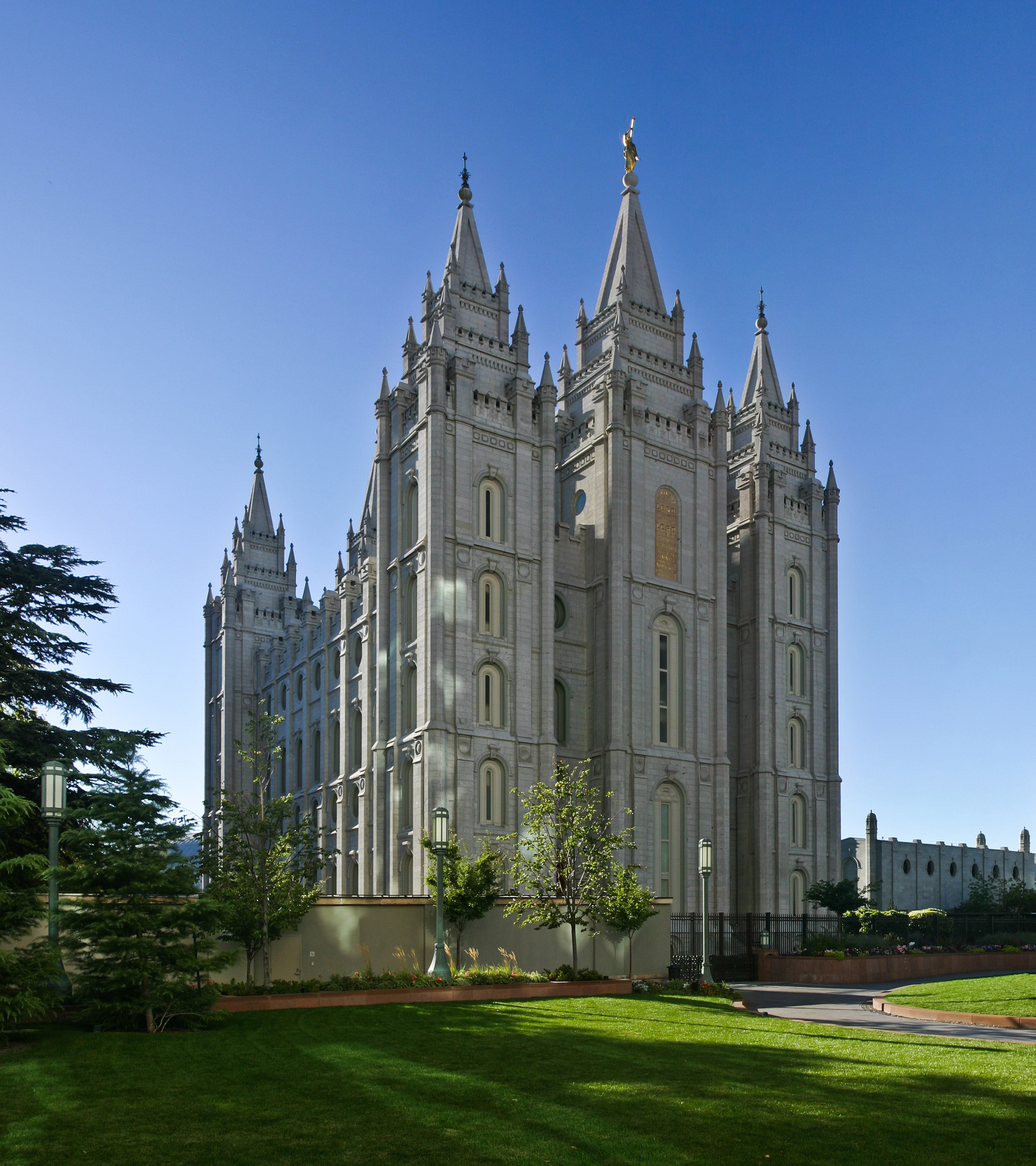
The Salt Lake Temple

In LDS theology, a temple is considered to be a holy building, dedicated as a "House of the Lord" and held as more sacred than a typical meetinghouse or chapel. In temples, church members participate in ceremonies that are considered the most sacred in the church, including marriage, and an endowment ceremony that includes a washing and anointing, receiving a temple garment, and making covenants with God. Baptisms for the dead—as well as other temple ordinances on behalf of the dead—are performed in the temples as well.

Temples are considered by church members to be the most sacred structures on earth, and as such, operating temples are not open to the public. Then after the temple is dedicated, permission to enter is reserved only for church members who pass periodic interviews with ecclesiastical leaders and receive a special recommendation card, called a temple recommend, that they present upon entry. Church members are instructed not to share details about temple ordinances with non-members or even converse about them outside the temple itself.

As of July 2025, there are over 200 currently operating temples worldwide. The LDS Church has 385 temples in various phases, which includes 227 dedicated temples (221 operating, 6 undergoing renovations), 6 with dedications scheduled, 59 under construction, 5 with groundbreaking ceremonies scheduled, and 86 others announced (not yet under construction).

To perform ordinances in temples on behalf of deceased family members, the church emphasizes genealogical research, and encourages its lay members to participate in genealogy. It operates FamilySearch, the largest genealogical organization in the world.

=== Conferences ===
Twice each year (the first weekend of April and October), general authorities and general officers address the worldwide church through general conference. General conference sessions are translated into as many as 80 languages and are broadcast from the 21,000-seat Conference Center in Salt Lake City. During this conference, church members formally acknowledge, or "sustain", the First Presidency and Quorum of the Twelve Apostles as prophets, seers, and revelators.

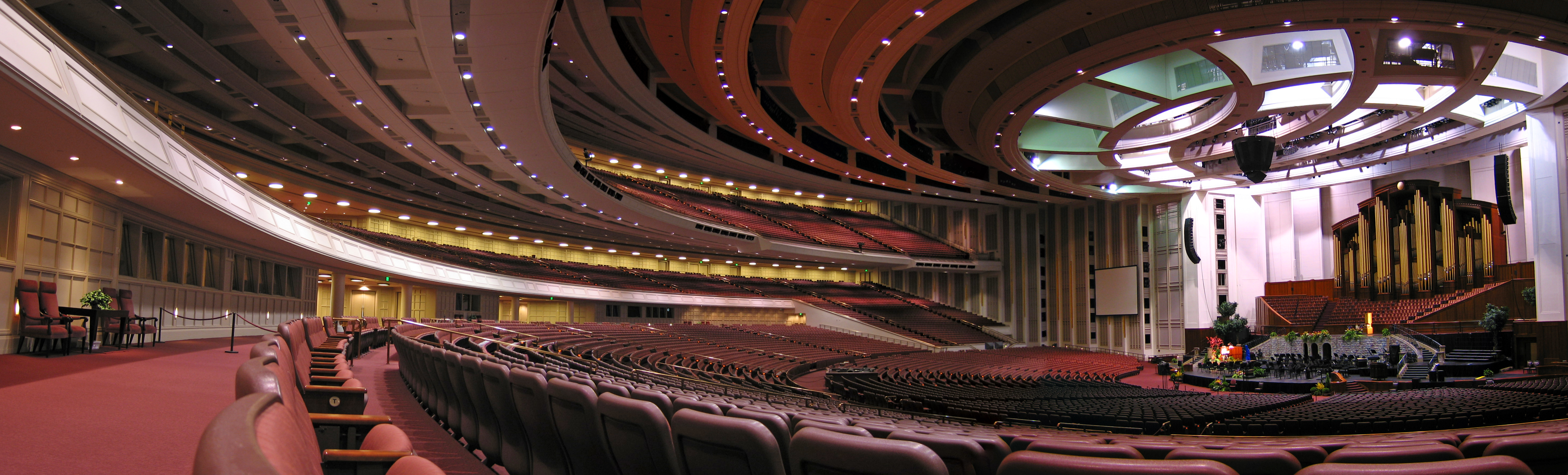
Interior of the Conference Center where the church holds its General Conferences twice a year

Individual stakes also hold formal conferences within their own boundaries biannually; wards hold conferences annually.

== Organization and structure ==
=== Name and legal entities ===
The church teaches that it is a continuation of the Church of Christ restored in 1830 by Joseph Smith. This original church underwent several name changes during the 1830s, being changed to "The Church of the Latter Day Saints", "The Church of Jesus Christ", "The Church of God", "The Church of Christ of Latter Day Saints" and "The Church of Jesus Christ of Latter Day Saints" (by an 1838 revelation). Finally, after Smith died, Brigham Young and the largest body of Smith's followers incorporated the church in 1851 by legislation of the Utah Territory (Note: The initial legislation was made by the non-existent State of Deseret, thus was not legally valid, but was soon ratified by the Utah Territory in 1851 and 1855.) under the name "The Church of Jesus Christ of Latter-day Saints", which included a hyphenated "Latter-day" and a British-style lower-case d.

Common informal names for the church include the LDS Church, the Mormon Church, and the Latter-day Saints Church. The church requests that the official name be used when possible or, if necessary, shortened to "the Church" or "the Church of Jesus Christ". In August 2018, church president Russell M. Nelson asked members of the church and others to cease using the terms "LDS", "Mormon" and "Mormonism" to refer to the church, its membership, or its belief system and instead to call the church by its full and official name. (Note: During the Church's October 2018 General Conference, Nelson declared that the use of nicknames such as Mormon represented "a major victory for Satan".) Subsequent to this announcement, the church's premier vocal ensemble, the Mormon Tabernacle Choir, was officially renamed and became the "Tabernacle Choir at Temple Square". Reaction to the name change policy has been mixed.

Legally, the church currently functions as a corporation sole, incorporated in Utah.

Intellectual Reserve is a nonprofit corporation wholly owned by the church, which holds the church's intellectual property, such as copyrights, trademarks, and other media.

Utah Property Management Associates (UPMA), formerly Zions Securities Corporation (ZSC), is a subsidiary of Property Reserve Inc., which manages property owned by the Corporation of the President of The Church of Jesus Christ of Latter-day Saints mostly in Salt Lake City, Utah. They manage major corporate, residential, and retail spaces along with parking lots and plazas.

=== Priesthood hierarchy and church service ===
The LDS Church is organized in a hierarchical priesthood structure administered by its male members. Members of the church-wide leadership are called general authorities. They exercise both ecclesiastical and administrative leadership over the church and direct the efforts of regional leaders down to the local level. General authorities, general officers and mission presidents work full-time for the church, and typically receive stipends from church funds or investments. As well as speaking in general conference, general authorities and general officers speak to church members in local congregations throughout the world; they also speak to youth and young adults in broadcasts and at the Church Educational System (CES) schools, such as Brigham Young University (BYU). Local congregations are typically led by bishops, who perform similar functions to pastors in the Protestant tradition, or parish priests in the Roman Catholic Church.

All males who are living the standards of the church are generally considered for the priesthood and are ordained to the priesthood as early as age 11. Ordination occurs by a ceremony where hands are laid on the head of the one ordained. The priesthood is divided into an order for young men aged 11 years and older (called the Aaronic priesthood) and an order for men 18 years of age and older (called the Melchizedek priesthood).

Some church leaders and scholars have spoken of women holding or exercising priesthood power. However, women are not formally ordained to the priesthood, and they do not participate in public functions administered by the priesthood—such as passing the Sacrament, giving priesthood blessings, or holding leadership positions over mixed-gender congregations. In the early-to-mid 2010s, the Ordain Women organization sought formal priesthood ordination for women. In 2019, church leadership authorized LDS women to serve as witnesses for baptisms, a ceremonial role previously reserved for male priesthood holders.

Each active church member is expected to receive a calling, or position of assigned responsibility within the church. Church members do not generally pick their own callings, as they receive them from their leaders. Leadership positions in the church's various congregations are filled through the calling system, and the vast majority of callings are filled on a volunteer basis. (Note: The only paid positions in the Church are general authorities, general officers and mission presidents.) (Note: For a time, the church had a paid local clergy (e.g. stake presidents, bishops, patriarchs). However, that practice was discontinued in the early 1900s.) Members volunteer general custodial work for local church facilities.

=== Programs and organizations ===
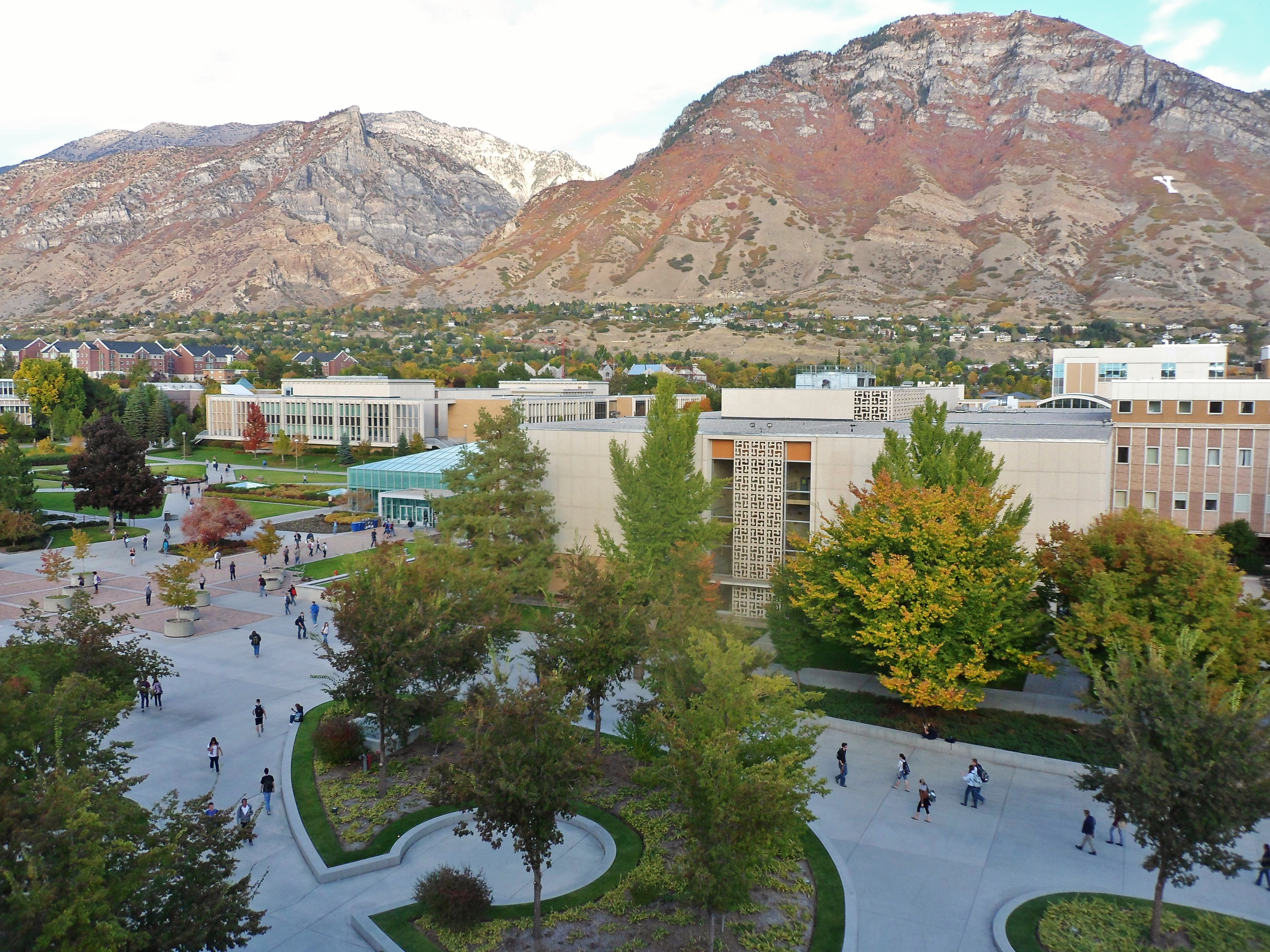
The campus of Brigham Young University, in Provo, Utah, one of several educational institutions sponsored by the church

The church operates several programs and organizations in the fields of proselytizing, education, and church welfare such as LDS Humanitarian Services. Many of these organizations and programs are coordinated by the Priesthood Correlation Program, which is designed to provide a systematic approach to maintain worldwide consistency, orthodoxy, and control of the church's ordinances, doctrines, organizations, meetings, materials, and other programs and activities.

The church also operates CES, which includes BYU, BYU–Idaho, BYU–Hawaii, and Ensign College. The church also operates Institutes of Religion near the campuses of many colleges and universities. For high-school aged youth, the church operates a four-year Seminary program, which provides religious classes for students to supplement their secular education. The church also sponsors a low-interest educational loan program known as the Perpetual Education Fund, which provides educational opportunities to students from developing nations.

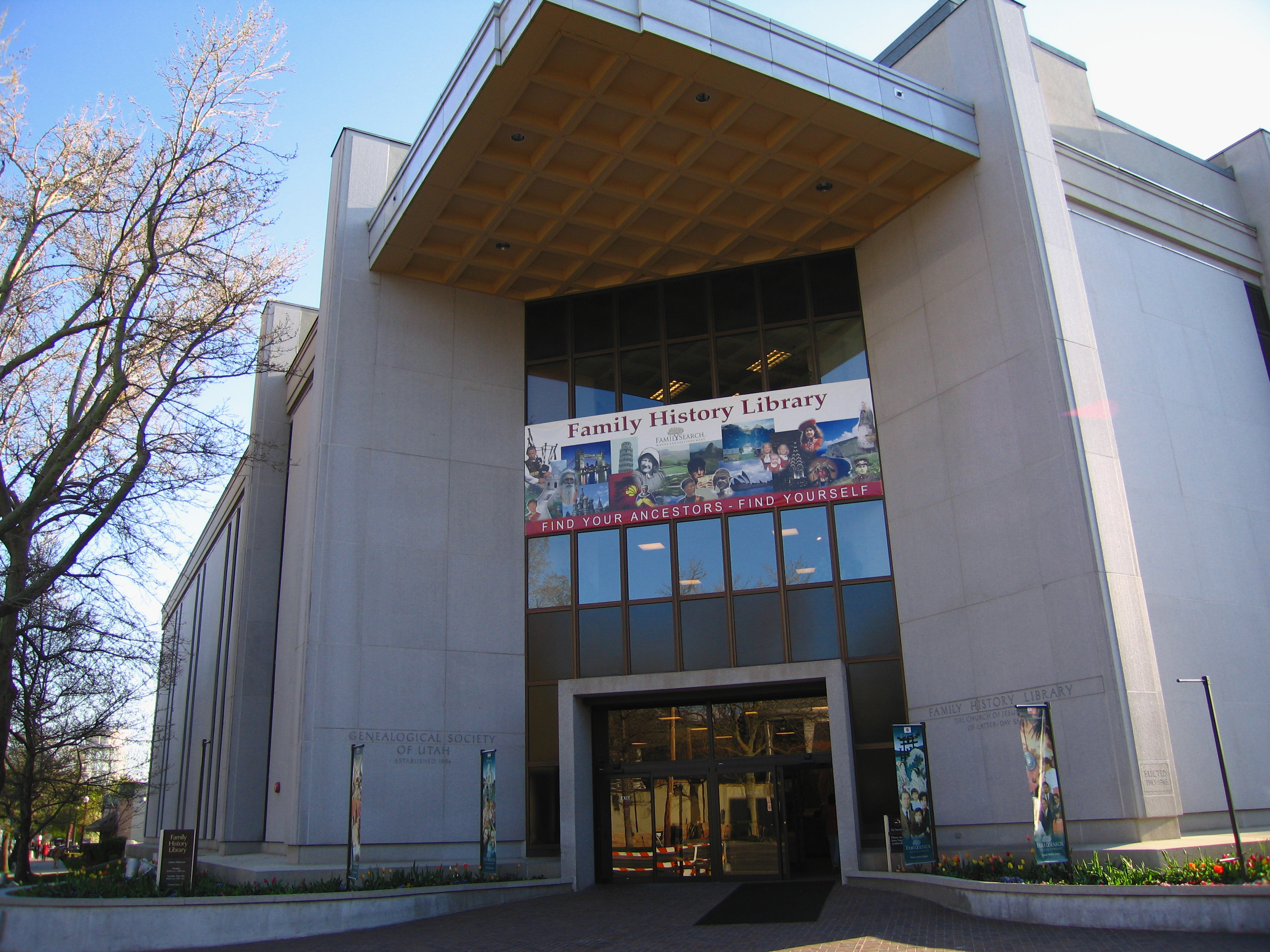
The church's Family History Library is the world's largest library dedicated to genealogical research.

The church's welfare system, initiated in 1930 during the Great Depression, provides aid to the poor. Leaders ask members to fast once a month and donate the money they would have spent on those meals to help the needy, in what is called a fast offering. Money from the program is used to operate Bishop's storehouses, which package and store food at low cost. Distribution of funds and food is administered by local bishops. The church also distributes money through its Philanthropies division to disaster victims worldwide.

Other church programs and departments include Family Services, which provides adoption resource referrals, marital and family counseling, psychotherapy, and addiction counseling; the LDS Church History Department, which collects church history and records; and the Family History Department, which administers the church's large family history efforts, including FamilySearch, the world's largest family history library and organization. Other facilities owned and operated by the church include Temple Square, the Church Office Building, the Church Administration Building, the Church History Library and the Granite Mountain Records Vault.

=== Finances ===
Since 1941, the church has been classified by the IRS as a 501(c)(3) organization and is therefore tax-exempt. Donations are tax-deductible in the United States. The church has not released church-wide financial statements since 1959. In the absence of official statements, people interested in knowing the church's financial status and behavior, including both members of the church and people outside the church, have attempted to estimate or guess. The church has stated that its for-profit, non-profit, and educational subsidiary entities are all audited by professionals independent from other church entities.

In 1997, Time magazine called the LDS Church one of the world's wealthiest churches per capita. In 2023, the church's net worth was reported by the Salt Lake Tribune to be estimated around $265 billion; this estimate would make the LDS Church one of the wealthiest religious institutions in the world.

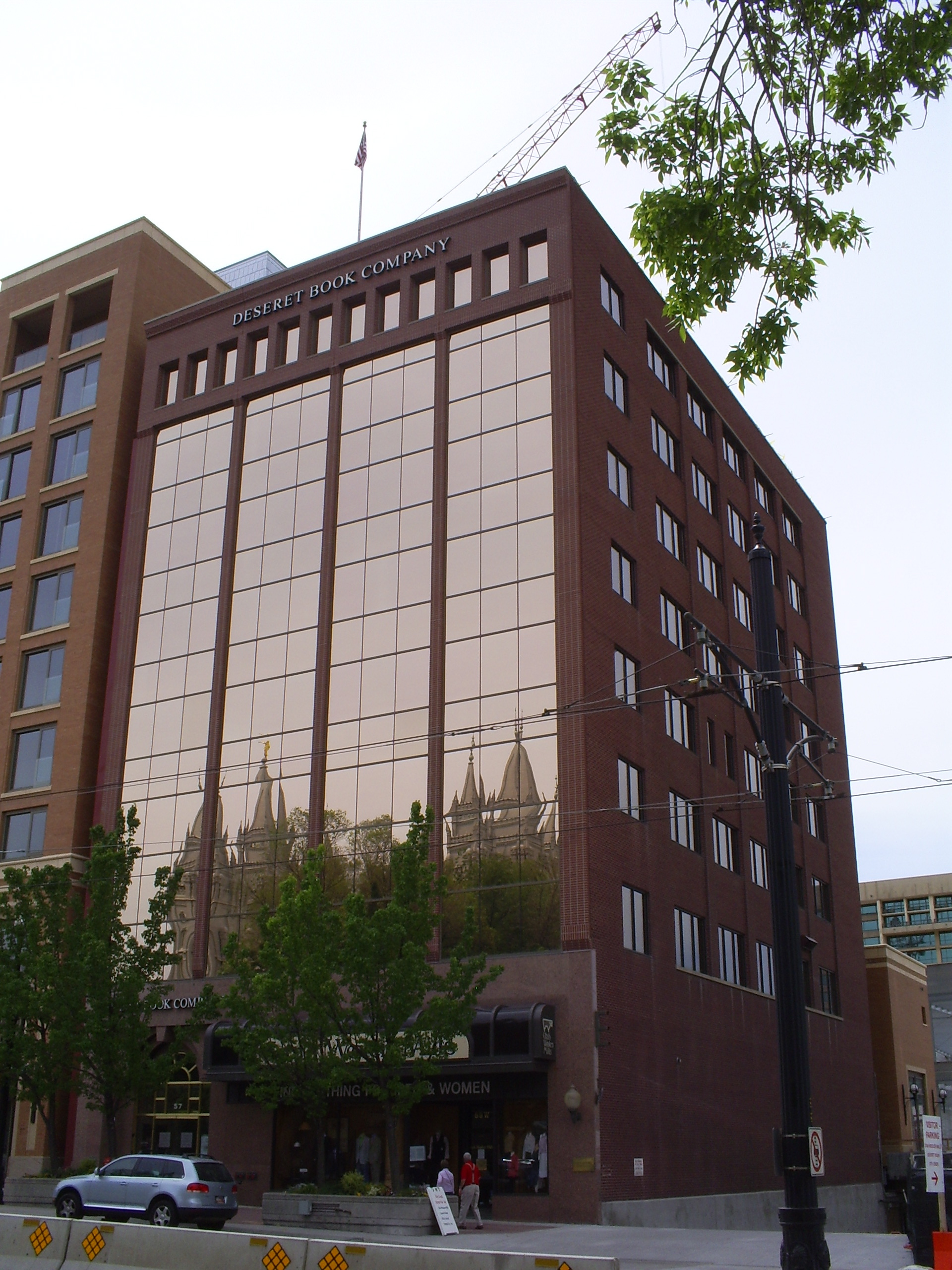
Deseret Book Company headquarters in Salt Lake City

The church receives significant funds from tithes and fast offerings. It has been estimated that during the 2010s its net worth increased by about $15 billion per year ($20.4 billion in 2025), and by $22 billion during the COVID-19 pandemic. According to a 2020 estimate by The Wall Street Journal, the LDS Church's investment fund had a net worth of around $100 billion.

The church's assets are held in a variety of holding companies, subsidiary corporations, and for-profit companies including: Bonneville International, KSL, Deseret Book Company, and holding companies for cattle ranches and farms in at least twelve U.S. States, Canada, New Zealand, and Argentina. Also included are banks and insurance companies, hotels and restaurants, real estate development, forestry and mining operations, and transportation and railway companies. Investigative journalism from the Truth & Transparency Foundation in 2022 suggests the church may be the owner of the most valuable real estate portfolio in the United States, with a minimum market value of $15.7 billion. The church has also invested in for-profit business and real estate ventures such as City Creek Center. In 2020, the church-owned investment firm Ensign Peak Advisors publicly reported management of $37.8 billion of financial securities. By summer 2023 assets including "international shares as well as bonds, hybrid investments, real estate and major stakes in private equity" were estimated to exceed $163 billion.

== Culture ==
Due to the differences in lifestyle promoted by church doctrine and history, members of the church have developed a distinct culture. It is primarily concentrated in the Mormon corridor of the Intermountain West.

Many of the church's more distinctive practices follow from their adherence to the Word of Wisdom—which includes abstinence from tobacco, alcohol, coffee, and tea—and their observance of Sabbath-day restrictions on recreation and shopping. Common, distinctive cuisine includes funeral potatoes and Jello salad. Cultural taboos exist on piercings (Note: Leaders state women should only have a maximum of one piercing in each ear, and men should not have any.) and tattoos and the church counsels against the use of crosses as symbols of worship.

=== Media and arts ===
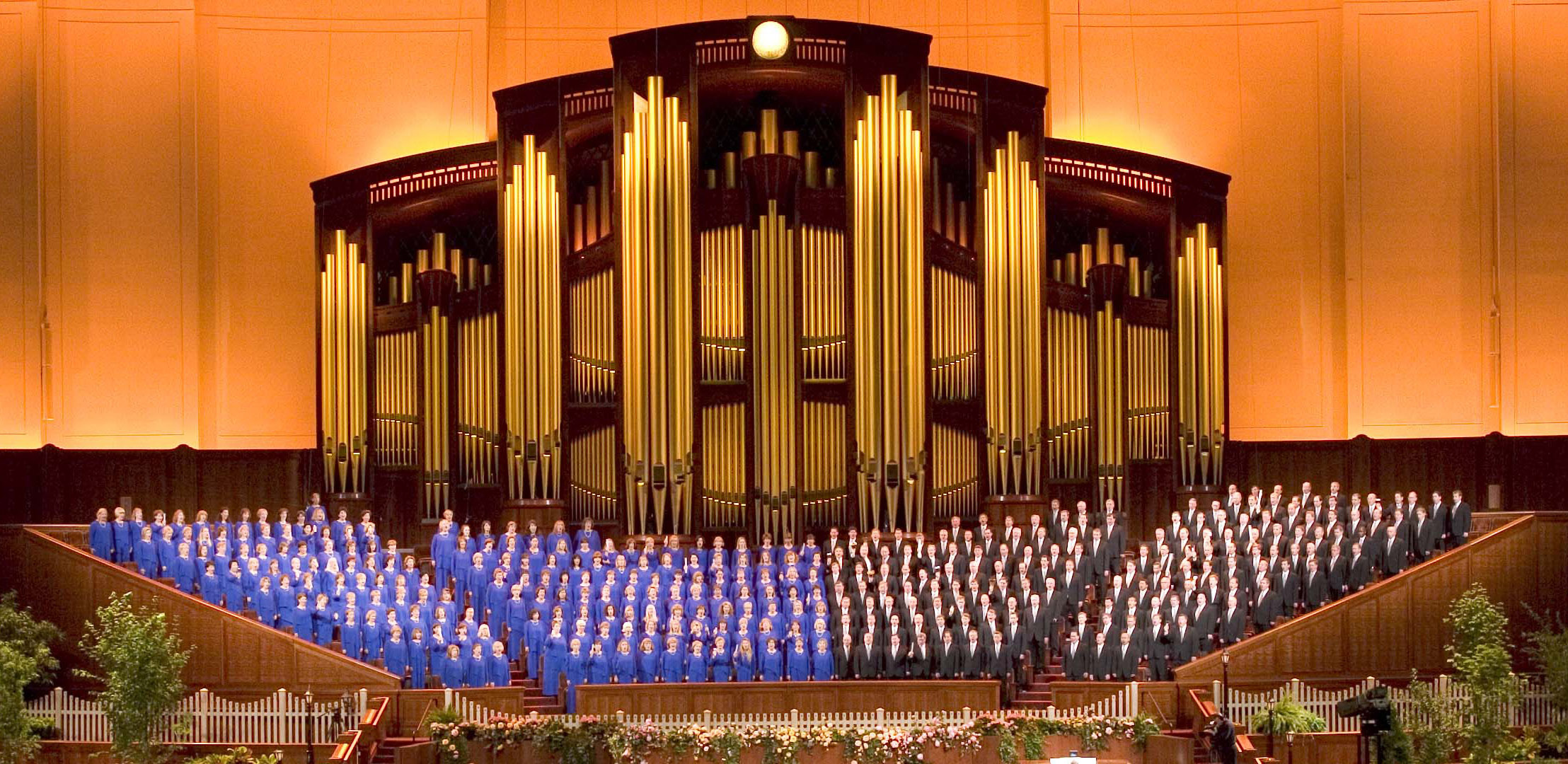
The Church-sponsored Tabernacle Choir at Temple Square has received various awards and has traveled extensively since its inception.

LDS-themed media includes cinema, fiction, websites, and graphical art such as photography and paintings. The church owns a chain of bookstores called Deseret Book. The church also produces several pageants annually depicting various events of the primitive and modern-day church. Its Easter pageant Jesus the Christ has been identified as the "largest annual outdoor Easter pageant in the world". The church encourages entertainment without violence, sexual content, or vulgar language; many church members specifically avoid rated-R movies.

The church's official choir, the Tabernacle Choir at Temple Square, was formed in the mid-19th century and performs in the Salt Lake Tabernacle. They have traveled to more than 28 countries, and are considered one of the most famous choirs in the world. The choir has received a Grammy Award, four Emmy Awards, two Peabody Awards, and the National Medal of Arts.

=== Political involvement in the U.S. ===
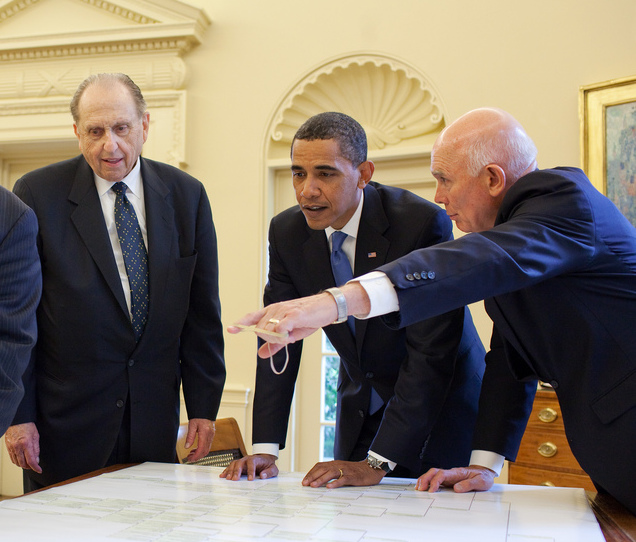
Church president Thomas S. Monson (left) and apostle Dallin H. Oaks (right) presenting U.S. president Barack Obama with his genealogy at the Oval Office in July 2009

The LDS Church states it generally takes no partisan role in politics, but encourages its members to play an active role as responsible citizens in their communities, including becoming informed about issues and voting. The church maintains that the faith's values can be found among many political parties. It also generally does not take sides in global conflicts.

A 2012 Pew Center on Religion and Public Life survey indicated that 74 percent of U.S. members lean towards the Republican Party. Some liberal members say they feel that they have to defend their worthiness due to political differences. Democrats and those who lean Democrat made up 18 percent of church members surveyed in the 2014 Pew Research Center's Religious Landscape Survey.

The church sometimes involves itself in politics when it believes the issues at hand to have moral implications or that they "directly affect [its] mission, teachings or operations." The church played an important role in striking down same-sex marriage legalization in Hawaii, Alaska, Nebraska, Nevada, California, and Utah. It supported a gay rights bill in Salt Lake City which bans discrimination against homosexual persons in housing and employment, opposed gambling, opposed storage of nuclear waste in Utah, and supported an approach to U.S. immigration policy as outlined in the Utah Compact. It also opposed a ballot initiative legalizing medicinal marijuana in Utah, but supported a possible alternative to it. In 2019 and 2021, the church stated its opposition to the Equality Act, which would prohibit discrimination in the United States on the basis of sexual orientation and gender identity, but supported alternate legislation that it said would protect both LGBTQ rights and religious freedom. In 2022, the church stated its support for the Respect for Marriage Act—which codified same-sex marriage as legal in the United States—due to the "protections for religious freedom" it included.

In the 117th United States Congress, there were nine LDS Church members, including all six members of Utah's congressional delegation, all of whom were Republicans. Utah's current governor, Spencer Cox, is a church member, as are super majorities in both houses of the Utah State Legislature. The 2012 Republican nominee for president, Mitt Romney, is also a church member.

== Demographics ==
Pew 2014 U.S. Religious Landscape Study	LDS (U.S.)	U.S. Avg.
Married	66%	49%
Divorced or separated	7%	11%
Have children under 18	41%	31%
Attendance at religious services (weekly or more)	77%	40%

The church reports a worldwide membership of 17 million, of which over 6.8 million live in the U.S. The church's definition of "membership" includes all persons who were ever baptized, or whose parents were members while the person was under the age of eight (called "members of record"), who have neither been excommunicated nor asked to have their names removed from church records. As of September 2019, approximately 9.6 million members resided outside the United States. (Note: Subtracting U.S. membership of 6,681,829 from total worldwide membership of 16,313,735, results in 9,631,906 members outside the U.S. (September 24, 2019).)

Pew Research Center 2014 Survey: Ethnicity	LDS (U.S.)	U.S. (2020)
White	85%	62%
Black	1%	12%
Latino	8%	12%
Asian	1%	6%
Other/Multiracial	5%	21%

According to its statistics, the church is the fourth largest religious body in the United States. Although the church does not publish attendance figures, researchers estimate that attendance at weekly LDS worship services globally is around 4 million. Members living in the U.S. and Canada constitute 46 percent of membership, Latin America 38 percent, and members in the rest of the world 16 percent. The 2012 Pew Forum on Religion & Public Life survey, conducted by Princeton Survey Research Associates International, found that approximately 2 percent of the U.S. adult population self-identified as Mormon.

Membership is concentrated geographically in the Intermountain West, in a specific region sometimes known as the Mormon corridor (i.e., the state of Utah, plus parts of Arizona, Colorado, Idaho, Nevada, and Wyoming). Church members and some others from the U.S. colonized this region in the mid-to-late 1800s, dispossessing several Indigenous tribes.

Nominal church membership has increased in a roughly linear fashion in the last half of the 20th century and into the 21st.

The church experienced rapid growth in the 20th century, especially in the 1980s and 1990s. In the 21st century, nominal church membership growth has continued, albeit at a lower percentage rate than before. In 2022, eight of the top ten nations with the highest LDS membership growth rate were in Africa, and Latino people are one of the fastest growing ethnic groups with millions of LDS adherents in Latin American countries.

In the United States, church members tend to be more highly educated than the general population. The racial and ethnic composition of membership in the United States is one of the least diverse in the country. Black membership is significantly lower than the general U.S. population.

The LDS Church does not release official statistics on church activity, but it is likely that approximately 40 percent of its recorded membership in the U.S. and 30 percent worldwide regularly attend weekly Sunday worship services. (Note: Reporting on a presentation given by the church's chief information officer, a Deseret News article indicated that one of Maxfield's statistics was that "about 36% [of church members] attend weekly sacrament meetings". The article was retracted with following disclaimer: "some of the statistics originally reported in this article have been removed because they have not been verified by the LDS Church. The information was removed at the request of the speaker.") According to a 2026 study by the Pew Research Center, around half (46%) of all US adults raised LDS disafilliate by adulthood. Church meeting attendance rates vary with age, and disengagement occurs most frequently between age 16 and 25. Young single adults are more likely to become inactive than their married counterparts, and women tend to be more active than men.

== Humanitarian services ==
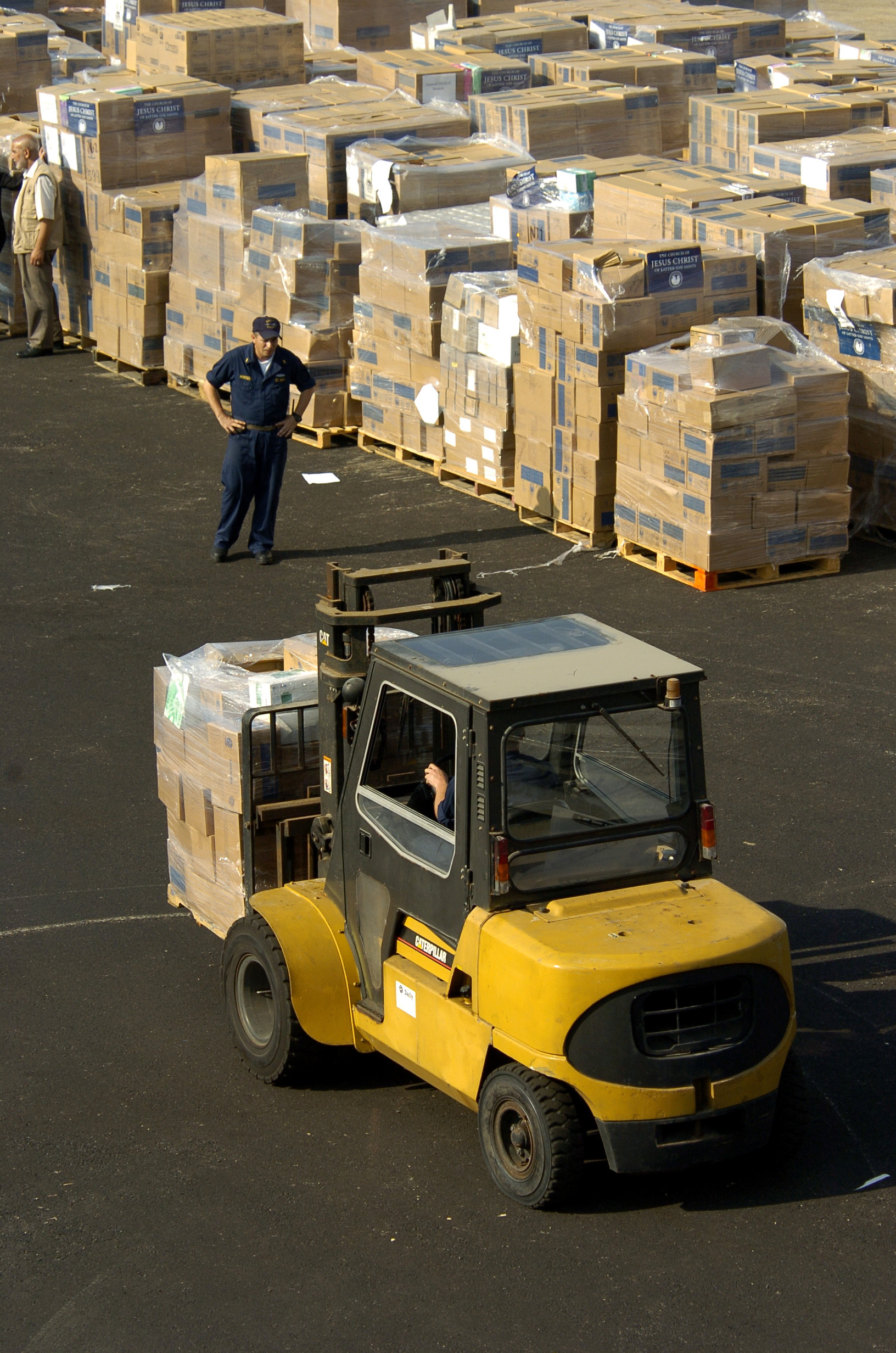
U.S. Navy sailors moving LDS Church-donated humanitarian supplies to Beirut, Lebanon, in 2006

The LDS Church is widely known for providing worldwide humanitarian service. The church's welfare and humanitarian efforts are coordinated by Philanthropies, a church department under the direction of the Presiding Bishopric. Welfare efforts, originally initiated during the Great Depression, provide aid for the poor, financed by donations from church members. Donations are also used to operate bishop's storehouses, which package and store food for lower-income people at low cost. In 2016, the church reported that it had spent a total of $1.2 billion on humanitarian aid over the previous 30 years.

Church humanitarian aid includes organizing food security, clean water, mobility, and healthcare projects, operating Deseret Industries thrift stores, and funding other organizations. The church reports that the value of all charitable donations in 2021 was $906 million. Independent reporting has found that the church's charity organization, LDS Charities, gave a total of $177 million from 2008 to 2020.

The church also distributes money and aid to disaster victims worldwide. In 2017, the church partnered with Catholic Relief Services and other organizations to provide aid to several African and Middle Eastern nations. In 2010, it partnered with Islamic Relief to help victims of flooding in Pakistan. Latter-day Saint Charities increased the conversion of stockpiled raw foods into finished food products during the COVID-19 pandemic and donated healthcare supplies to 16 countries affected by the crisis. The church has donated $4 million to aid refugees fleeing from the 2022 Russian invasion of Ukraine. In 2022, the church gave $32 million to the United Nations World Food Programme, in its largest known one-time donation to a humanitarian organization so far.

== Criticism and controversies ==
Modern criticism of the church includes disputed claims, allegations of historical revisionism by the church, child sexual abuse, sexism, racism, and anti-LGBTQ+ teachings. Notable 20th-century critics included Jerald and Sandra Tanner and historian Fawn Brodie.

=== Child sexual abuse ===
The church has been criticized for a number of abuses allegedly perpetrated or covered up by local church leadership; several cases have been settled out of court. In other cases, church leaders have been criticized for: allegedly failing to report abuse to law enforcement; improperly invoking clergy–penitent privilege in so doing; and failing to keep records of sexual abuse claims which were reported through its Helpline phone number.

=== Scriptures ===
In the late 1820s, criticism centered on the claim by Joseph Smith to have been led to a set of gold plates from which the Book of Mormon was reputedly translated.

Mainstream archaeological, historical, and scientific communities have discovered little to support the existence of the civilizations described in the Book of Mormon and do not consider it to be an actual record of historical events. Scholars have pointed out a number of anachronisms within the text. They argue that no evidence of a reformed Egyptian language has ever been discovered, (Note: Standard language references such as Peter T. Daniels and William Bright, eds., The World's Writing Systems (New York: Oxford University Press, 1996) (990 pages); David Crystal, The Cambridge Encyclopedia of Language (Cambridge University Press, 1997); and Roger D. Woodard, ed., The Cambridge Encyclopedia of the World's Ancient Languages (Cambridge University Press, 2004) (1162 pages) contain no reference to "reformed Egyptian". "Reformed Egyptian" is also ignored in Andrew Robinson, Lost Languages: The Enigma of the World's Undeciphered Scripts (New York: McGraw Hill, 2002). Smith's discussion of it is mentioned in Fantastic Archaeology.) explicitly contradicting the Book of Mormon's claim that it was written in Reformed Egyptian. Also, general archaeological and genetic evidence has not supported the book's statements about any known indigenous peoples of the Americas.

Since its publication in 1842, the Book of Abraham, currently published as part of the canonical Pearl of Great Price, has also been a major source of controversy. Numerous non-Mormon Egyptologists, beginning in the late 19th century, have disagreed with Joseph Smith's explanations of the book's facsimiles. Translations of the original papyri—by both Mormon and non-Mormon Egyptologists—do not match the text of the Book of Abraham as purportedly translated by Joseph Smith. The transliterated text from the recovered papyri and facsimiles published in the Book of Abraham contain no direct references to the Hebrew patriarch Abraham. Scholars have also asserted that damaged portions of the papyri were reconstructed incorrectly by Smith or his associates.

=== Polygamy ===
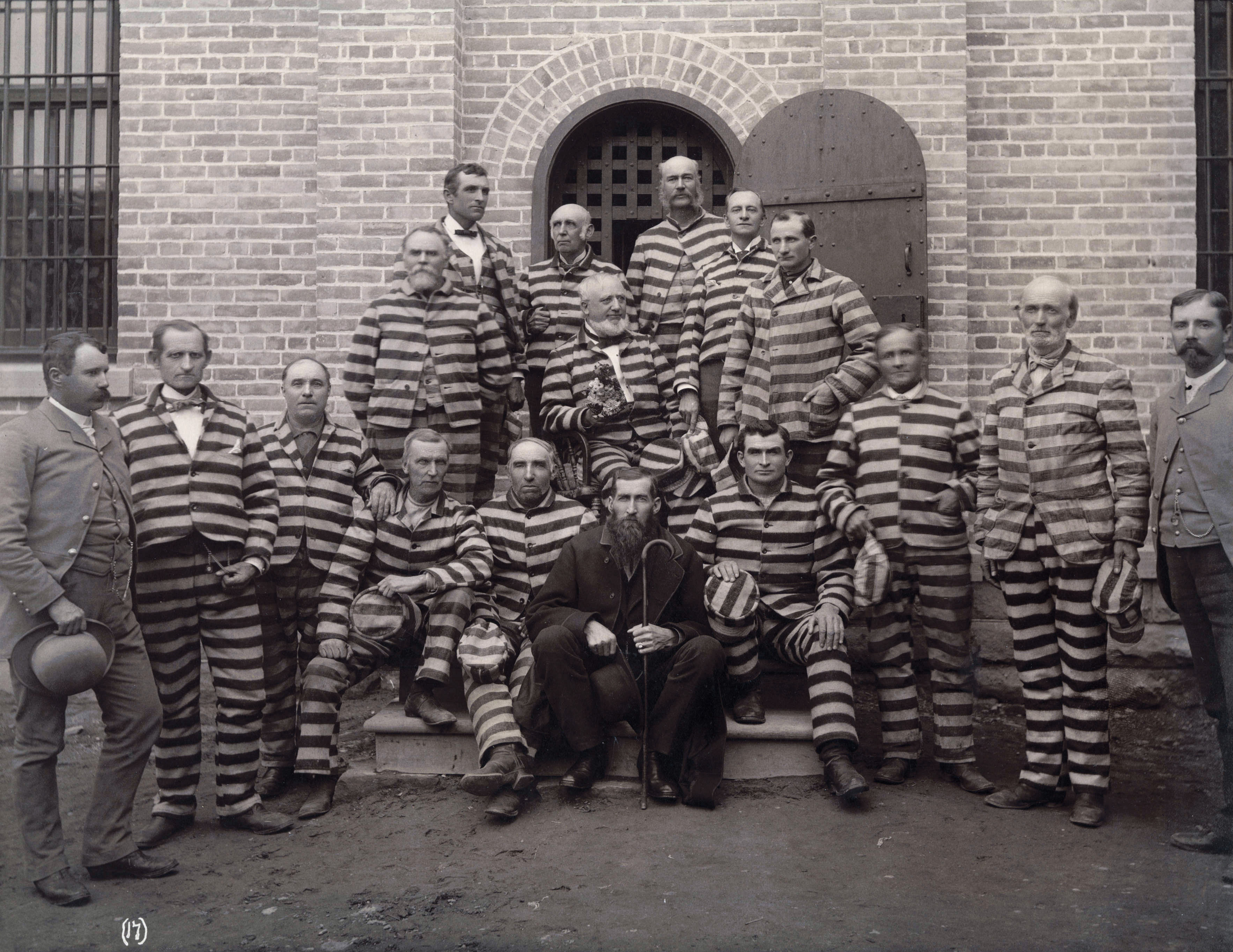
Mormon polygamists in prison at the Utah Penitentiary, c. 1889

Polygamy, called plural marriage within the church, was practiced by church leaders for more than half of the 19th century, and practiced publicly from 1852 to 1890 by between 20 and 30 percent of Latter-day Saint families. It was instituted privately in the 1830s by founder Joseph Smith and announced publicly in 1852 at the direction of Brigham Young.

For over 60 years, the church and the United States were at odds over the issue: at one point, the Republican platform referenced "the twin relics of barbarism—polygamy and slavery." The church defended the practice as a matter of religious freedom, while the federal government aggressively sought to eradicate it; in 1862, the United States Congress passed the Morrill Anti-Bigamy Act, which prohibited plural marriage in the territories.

In 1890, church president Wilford Woodruff issued a manifesto that officially terminated the practice in the U.S., though it did not dissolve existing polygamous marriages. Some church members continued to enter into polygamous marriages in Canada and Mexico, but these eventually stopped in 1904 when church president Joseph F. Smith disavowed polygamy before Congress and issued a "Second Manifesto" calling for all plural marriages in the church to cease. Several small fundamentalist groups, seeking to continue the practice, split from the LDS Church, which now excommunicates members found practicing polygamy and distances itself from those fundamentalist groups. The church does allow divorced or widowed men to be sealed to other women without cancelling any existing sealings.

=== Minorities ===
==== Black people ====
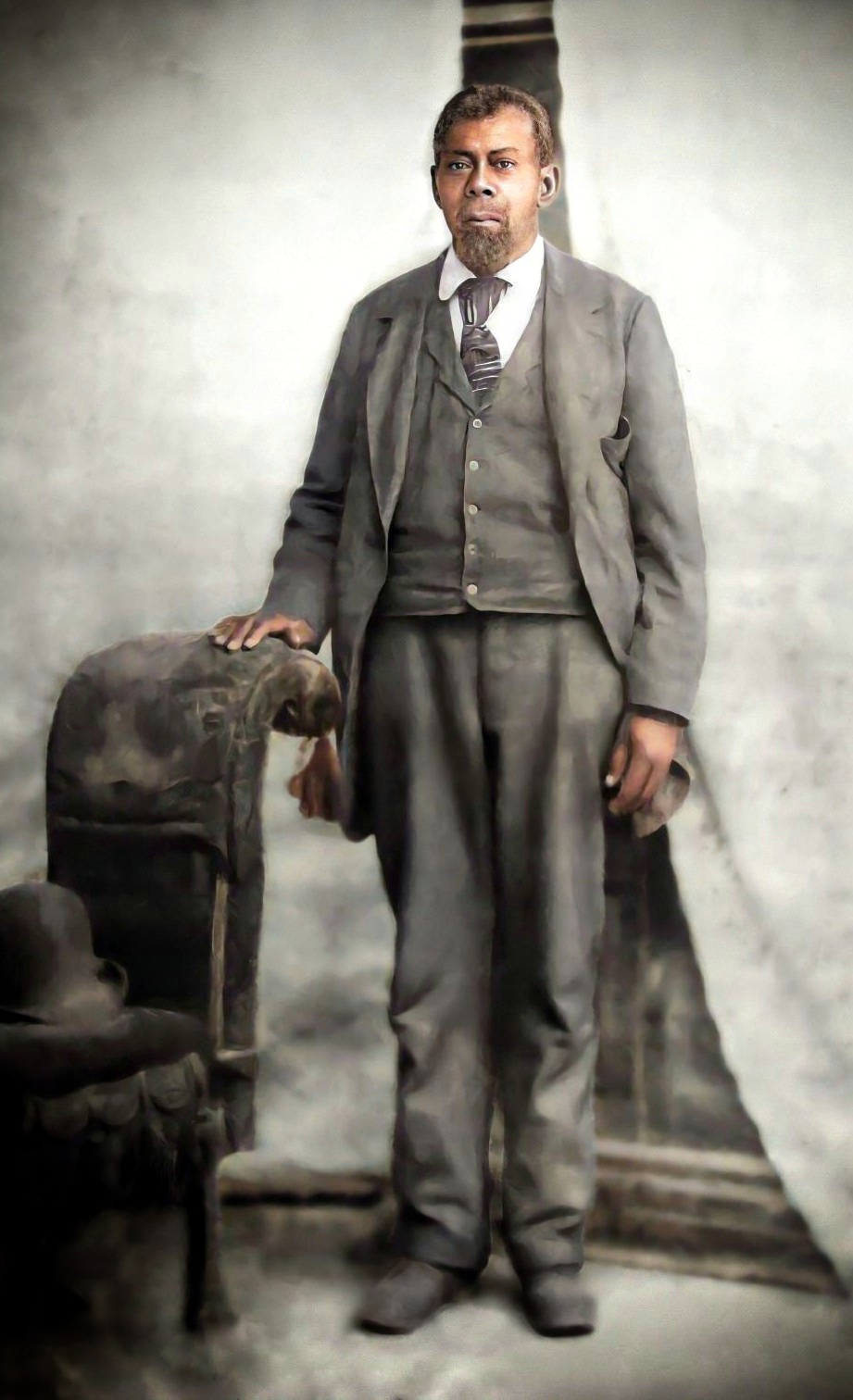
Green Flake, an enslaved Black man, was reported to have driven the first wagon of LDS pioneers to the Salt Lake Valley in 1847.

The teachings, attitudes, and practices of top LDS Church leaders towards Black people have changed significantly from the church's founding years, and the church has faced criticism and controversy on these topics. Joseph Smith allowed several Black men to be ordained as priests during his presidency, but also taught that the dark skin of people of Black African ancestry was a sign of a curse from God. Both Smith and Brigham Young taught that Black people were subject to the biblical curse of Ham, and curse of Cain. Both made statements in support of Black enslavement, and Young legalized Black slavery while acting as the Utah territory's governor.

From 1844 to 1978, the church barred Black people from participating in temple ordinances necessary for the highest level of salvation; prevented most men of Black African descent from being ordained to the church's lay, all-male priesthood; supported racial segregation in its communities and schools; taught that righteous Black people would be made White after death; and opposed interracial marriage. Leaders taught on many occasions during this time that Black people were less righteous in the pre-existence. The temple and priesthood racial restrictions were lifted by top leaders in 1978 following public pressure during the United States' civil rights movement. (Note: Examples of public pressure include: In 1963, Hugh B. Brown made a statement on civil rights during the year's General Conference to avert a planned protest of the conference by the NAACP.; During the late 1960s and 1970s, Black athletes at some universities refused to compete against teams from church-owned Brigham Young University as a form of protest.; A protest in 1974 was in response to the exclusion of Black scouts from becoming leaders in church-sponsored Boy Scout troops.) In 2013, the church directly disavowed its previous teachings on race for the first time. In 2018, the Church formed an alliance with the NAACP in an effort to improve race relations.

==== Native American people ====
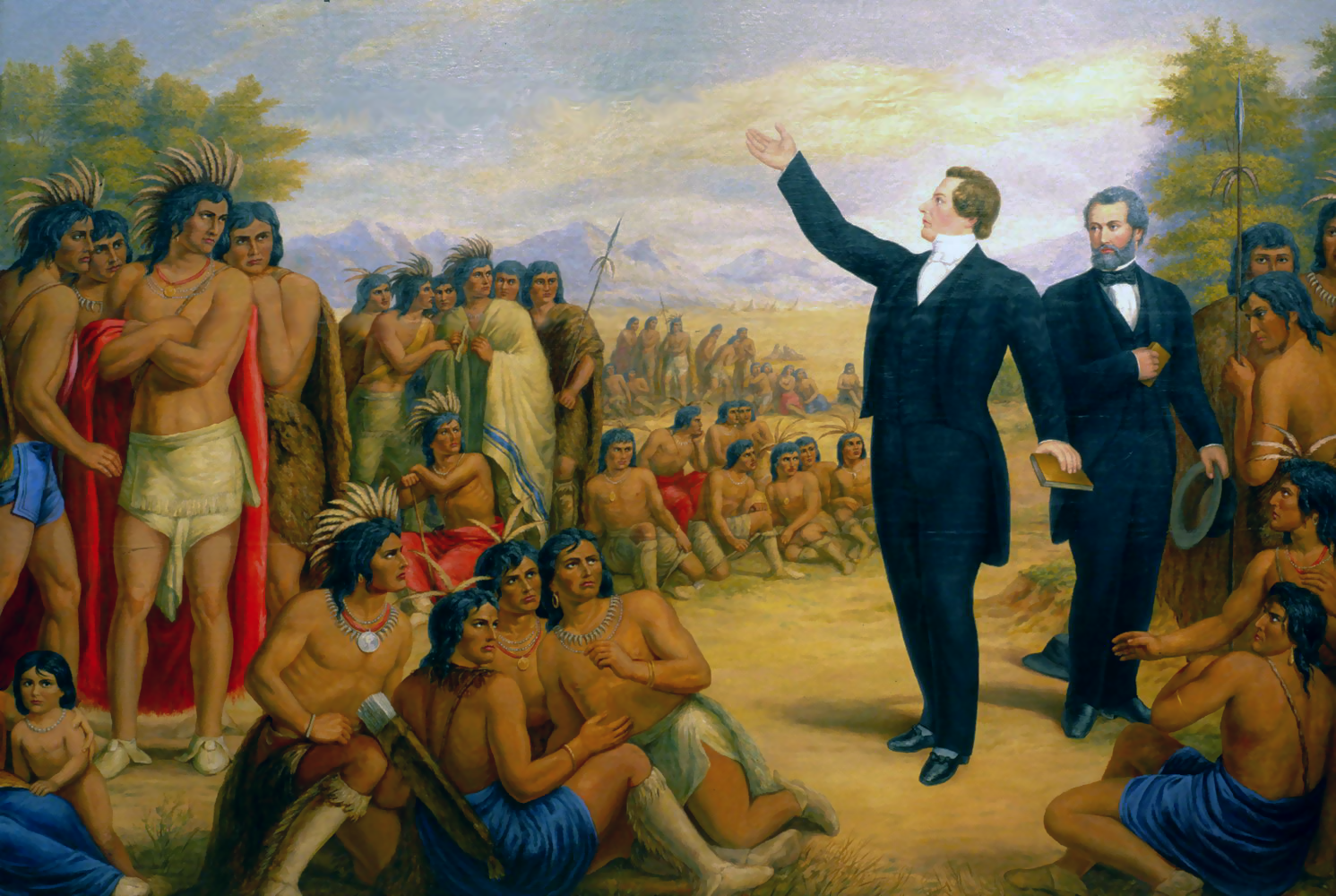
Artistic depiction of Joseph Smith preaching to Native Americans in Illinois

Over the past two centuries, the relationship between Native American people and the LDS Church has included friendly ties, displacement, battles, massacres, slavery, education placement programs, official and unofficial discrimination, and criticism. Church leadership and publications taught that Native Americans are descendants of Lamanites, a dark-skinned and cursed people from the Book of Mormon. More recently, LDS researchers and publications generally favor a smaller geographic footprint of Lamanite descendants. (Note: Prior to 2006, the introduction to church-published editions of the Book of Mormon stated Lamanites form the "principal ancestors of the American Indians." Since the 2006 edition, the same passage now reads they are "among the ancestors of the American Indians.") There is no direct support amongst mainstream historians and archaeologists for the historicity of the Book of Mormon or Middle Eastern origins for Native American peoples.

The settlers initially had some peaceful relations, but because resources were scarce in the desert, hostilities broke out with the local Native Americans. According to LDS Church Historian Marlin K. Jensen, as more LDS immigrants arrived and took over the land of Native nations, "Resources the Indians had relied on for generations diminished, and in time they felt forced to resist and fight for their own survival ... the land and cultural birthright Indians once possessed in the Great Basin were largely taken from them." Within 50 years of Mormon settlement, the population of Utah's Native Americans was reduced by almost 90 percent.

The church ran an Indian Placement Program between the 1950s and the 1990s, wherein indigenous children would live in the homes of church members during one or more school years. Criticism resulted during and after the program, including claims of improper assimilation and even abuse. However, many of the involved students and families praised the program. Church leaders taught for decades that Native Americans' darker skin would be made lighter due to their righteousness.

==== LGBTQ individuals ====
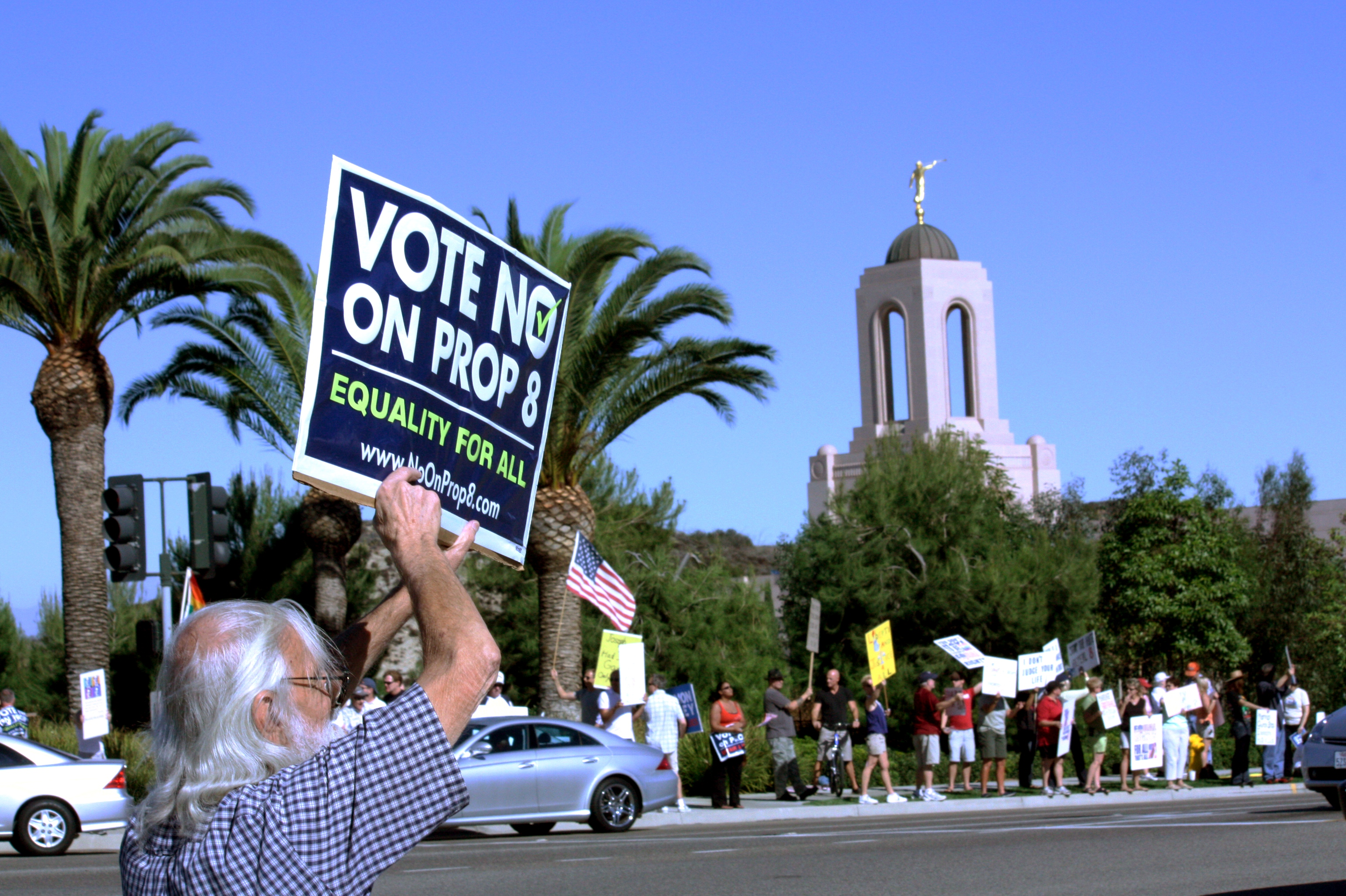
Protesters in front of the Newport Beach California Temple voicing their opposition to the church's support of Prop 8

The church's policies and treatment of sexual minorities and gender minorities have long been the subject of external criticism, as well as internal controversy and disaffection by members. Because of its ban against same-sex sexual activity and same-sex marriage, the LDS Church taught for decades that any adherents attracted to the same sex could and should change that through sexual orientation-change efforts and "righteous striving". The church provided therapy and programs for attempts to change sexual orientation.

Current teachings and policies leave gay and bisexual members with the options of entering a mixed-orientation opposite-sex marriage or lifelong celibacy. Some have argued that church teachings against homosexuality and the treatment of LGBTQ members have contributed to their elevated rates of PTSD, depression, suicide, and teen homelessness. The church's decades-long political involvement opposing U.S. same-sex marriage laws has further garnered criticism and protests.

Those considering gender-affirming surgery are not allowed to be baptized in the LDS Church, and those who have already undergone surgery need special clearance from the First Presidency before baptism. Undergoing a "trans-sexual [sic] operation", including feminizing surgery or masculinizing surgery like chest reconstruction (i.e., "top" surgery), may imperil the membership of a current member. Ordinances after baptism, such as receiving the priesthood and temple endowments, are done according to individuals' listed birth sex. Members who gender-express through clothing or personal pronouns that differ from the norm for the sex assigned at their birth will receive membership restrictions and a notation on their membership records.

=== Criticism of Joseph Smith ===
In the 1830s, the church was heavily criticized for Smith's handling of a banking failure in Kirtland, Ohio. After the Mormons migrated west, there was fear and suspicion about the LDS Church's political and military power in Missouri, (Note: Bushman noted that in Daviess County, Missouri, non-Mormons "watched local government fall into the hands of people they saw as deluded fanatics".) culminating in the 1838 Mormon War and the Mormon Extermination Order by Governor Lilburn Boggs. In the 1840s, criticism of the church included its theocratic aspirations in Nauvoo, Illinois. Criticism of the practice of plural marriage and other doctrines Smith taught were published in the Nauvoo Expositor in 1844. (Note: Historian Fawn Brodie argued that given its authors' intentions to reform the church, the paper was "extraordinarily restrained" given the explosive allegations it could have raised. A prospectus for the newspaper was published on May 10 and referred to Smith as a "self-constituted monarch".) After Smith took a leading role in having the paper's printing press destroyed, he was charged with treason and jailed. While he awaited trial, an angry mob stormed the jailhouse and shot him fatally.

In modern popular opinion, non-Mormons in the U.S. generally consider Smith a "charlatan, scoundrel, and heretic." The Book of Mormon musical mocks his account of the golden plates. In 2007, Christopher Hitchens, writing in Slate, lambasted Smith as a mountebank, charlatan, and fraud (and the church itself as a "ridiculous cult" and a "racket" that became a religion).

=== Financial controversy ===
The church has fought to keep its internal financial information out of the public record. The church's failure to make its finances public has drawn criticism.

In December 2019, a whistleblower alleged the church held over $100 billion in investment funds through its investment management company, Ensign Peak Advisors (EP); that it used these funds in for-profit ventures rather than charity; and that it misled contributors and the public about the usage and extent of those funds. The church's First Presidency stated that "the Church complies with all applicable law governing our donations, investments, taxes, and reserves," and that "a portion" of funds received by the church are "methodically safeguarded through wise financial management and the building of a prudent reserve". The church has not directly addressed the fund's size to the public, but third parties have treated the disclosures as legitimate. The disclosure has led to criticism that the church's wealth may be excessive.

The church has transferred more than a billion dollars of tax-free tithing collected in Canada to church universities over 15 years. In October 2022, The Sydney Morning Herald announced that while the church publicly claimed to have donated US$1.35 billion to charity between 2008 and 2020, its private financial reports showed that it donated only US$0.177 billion. (Note: The Widow's Mite Report, an anonymous 3rd-party focused on analysis of church finances, evaluated SMH's claims and concluded they "offer only a partial picture" of the church's humanitarian giving during the period in question.)

In February 2023, the U.S. Securities and Exchange Commission (SEC) issued a $5 million penalty to the church and its investment company, EP. The SEC alleged that the church concealed its investments and their management in multiple shell companies from 1997 to 2019; the SEC believes these shell companies were approved by senior church leadership to avoid public transparency. The church released a statement that in 2000, EP "received and relied upon legal counsel regarding how to comply with its reporting obligations while attempting to maintain the privacy of the portfolio." After initial SEC concern in June 2019, the church stated that EP "adjusted its approach and began filing a single aggregated report."

== See also ==
- Index of articles related to the LDS Church
- List of missions (LDS Church)
- Christianity in the United States
- Anti-Mormonism
- List of attacks against Latter-day Saint churches
- Mormon (word)
- Mormonism and Islam
- Mormonism and Judaism
- Mormonism and women
- Latino Mormons
- List of new religious movements
- List of Latter Day Saint periodicals
