= Outline of Brazil =

Country in South America

The flag of Brazil

The coat of arms of Brazil

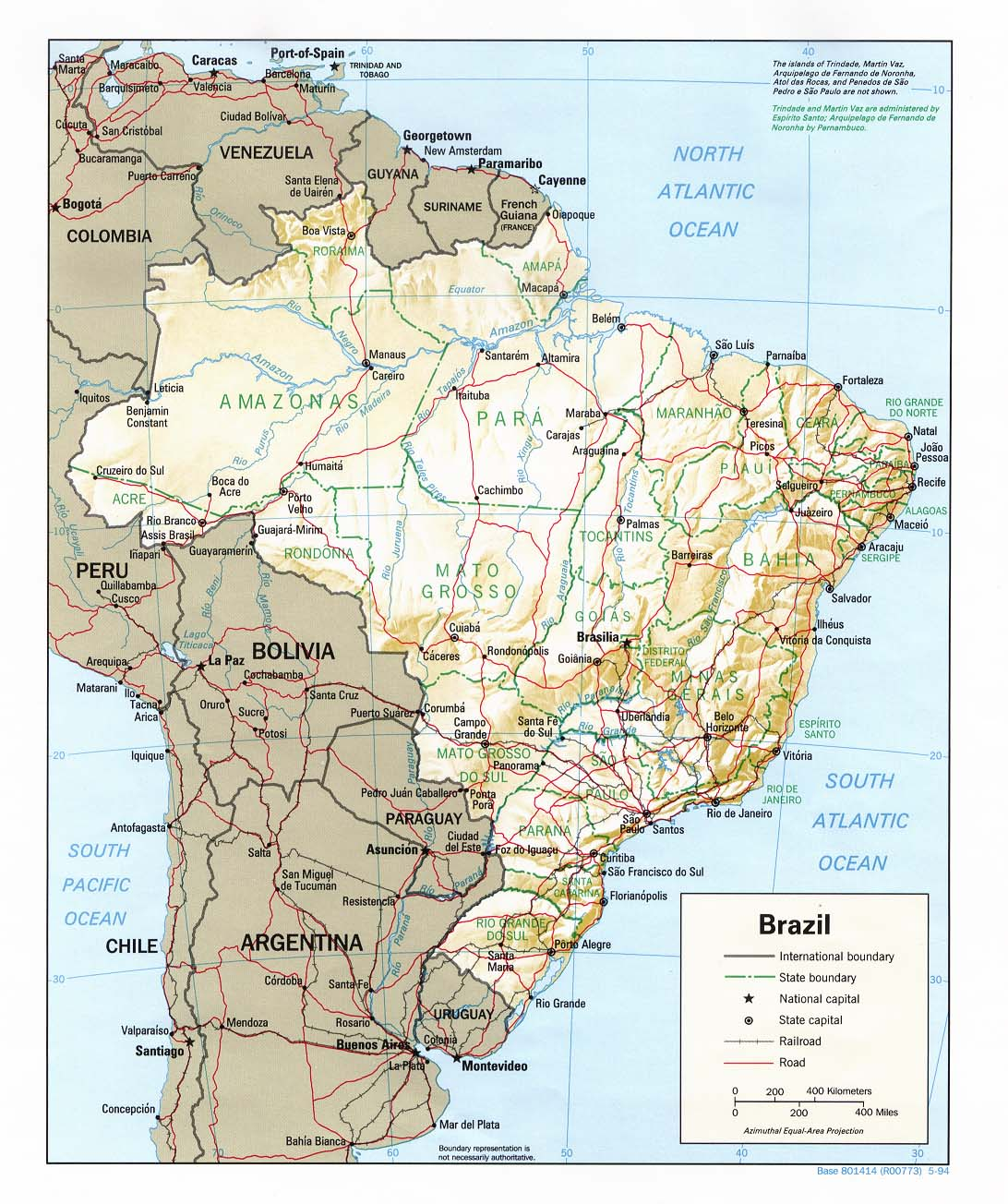
An enlargeable relief map of Brazil

The following outline is provided as an overview of and topical guide to Brazil:

Brazil – largest country in both South America and Latin America. With a geographical area of 8.5 million km^{2}, Brazil is also the largest country in the Southern Hemisphere and the world's fifth-largest country. With over 206 million people, Brazil is the seventh-most-populous country in the world. It is the largest Lusophone country in the world, and the only one in the Americas.

== General reference ==
An enlargeable basic map of Brazil

- Pronunciation: /brəˈzɪl/
  - Brazilian Portuguese: [bɾaˈziw]
- Common English country name: Brazil
- Official English country name: The Federative Republic of Brazil
- Common endonym: Brasil
- Official endonym: República Federativa do Brasil
- Adjectival and demonymic: Brazilian

== Geography of Brazil ==
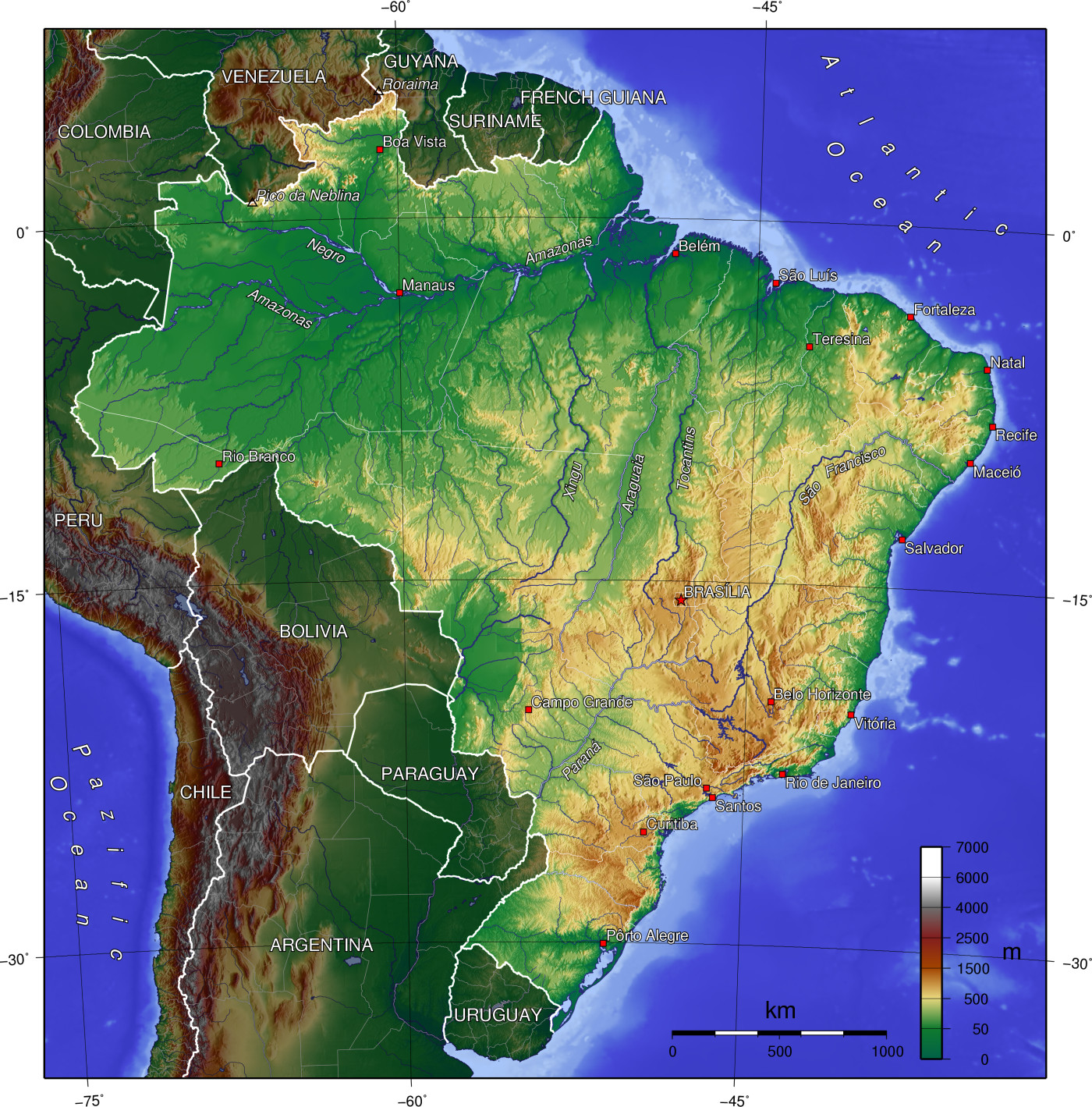
An enlargeable topographic map of Brazil

Geography of Brazil

- Brazil is: a megadiverse country
- Location:
  - Western Hemisphere, on the Equator
    - South America
  - Time zones:
    - UTC-02: Fernando de Noronha, Trindade and Martin Vaz, Atol das Rocas, Saint Peter and Paul Rocks
    - UTC-03: Alagoas, Amapá, Bahia, Ceará, Distrito Federal, Espírito Santo, Goiás, Maranhão, Minas Gerais, Pará, Paraíba, Paraná, Pernambuco, Piauí, Rio de Janeiro, Rio Grande do Norte, Rio Grande do Sul, Santa Catarina, São Paulo, Sergipe, Tocantins
    - UTC-04: Amazonas, Mato Grosso, Mato Grosso do Sul, Rondônia, Roraima
    - UTC-05: Acre
  - Extreme points of Brazil
    - High: Pico da Neblina 2,994 m (9,823 ft)
    - Low: Atlantic Ocean 0 m
  - Land boundaries: 16,885 km

Bolivia 3,423 km
Peru 2,995 km
Venezuela 2,200 km
Colombia 1,644 km
Guyana 1,606 km
Paraguay 1,365 km
Argentina 1,261 km
Uruguay 1,068 km
French Guiana 730 km
Suriname 593 km

- Coastline: 7,491 km

- Population of Brazil: 207,752,291 (2023) - 5th most populous country
- Area of Brazil: 8,514,877 square kilometres (3,287,612 sq mi) - 5th largest country
- Atlas of Brazil

=== Environment of Brazil ===
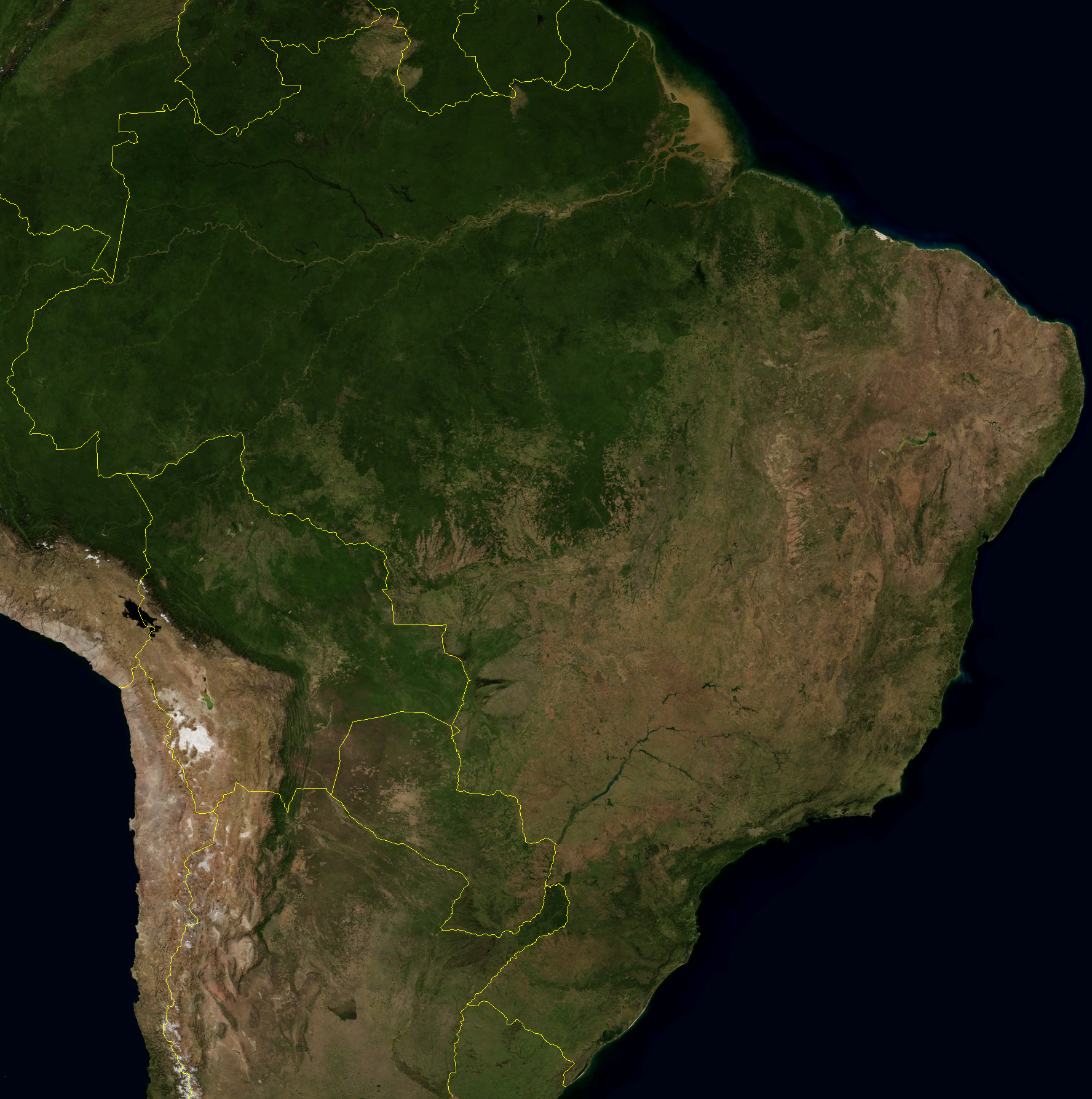
An enlargeable satellite image of Brazil

Environment of Brazil

- Climate of Brazil
- Ecoregions in Brazil
- Environmental issues in Brazil
- Protected areas of Brazil
- Biosphere reserves in Brazil
- Renewable energy in Brazil
- Wildlife of Brazil
  - Flora of Brazil
    - Endangered flora of Brazil
  - Fauna of Brazil
    - Birds of Brazil
    - Mammals of Brazil

==== Natural geographic features of Brazil ====
- Islands of Brazil
- Lakes of Brazil
- Mountains of Brazil
  - Volcanoes in Brazil
- Rivers of Brazil
  - Waterfalls of Brazil
- World Heritage Sites in Brazil

=== Regions of Brazil ===
Regions of Brazil

==== Statistical regions ====
- North Region
- Northeast Region
- Central-West Region
- Southeast Region
- Southern Region

==== Socio-geographic divisions ====
- Amazônia Legal
- Centro-Sul
- Nordeste

==== Ecoregions of Brazil ====
List of ecoregions in Brazil

==== Administrative divisions of Brazil ====
Administrative divisions of Brazil

- States of Brazil
  - Municipalities of Brazil

===== States of Brazil =====
States of Brazil

Flag	State	Abbreviation	Capital	Area (km^{2})	Area (sq mi)	Population (2014)	Density (per km^{2}, 2014)	Density (per sq mi, 2014)	GDP (billion R$ and % total, 2012)	GDP per capita (R$, 2012)	HDI (2021)	Literacy (2014)	Infant mortality (2014)	Life expectancy (years, 2014)
	Acre	AC	Rio Branco	152,581.4	58,912	790,101	4.47	13	9.629 (0.2%)	12,690	0.710	94%	1.6%	75.4
	Alagoas	AL	Maceió	27,767.7	10,721	3,321,730	112.3	309	29.545 (0.7%)	9,333	0.684	90%	1.7%	73.5
	Amapá	AP	Macapá	142,814.6	55,151	750,912	4.69	13	10.420 (0.2%)	14,914	0.688	99%	1.6%	75.4
	Amazonas	AM	Manaus	1,570,745.7	606,470	3,873,743	2.23	6	64.120 (1.7%)	17,855	0.700	96%	1.9%	73.7
	Bahia	BA	Salvador	564,692.7	218,030	15,126,371	24.82	69	167.727 (3.8%)	11,832	0.691	91%	2.0%	74.3
	Ceará	CE	Fortaleza	148,825.6	57,462	8,842,791	56.8	153	90.132 (2.0%)	10,473	0.734	93%	1.65%	74.9
	Distrito Federal	DF	Brasília	5,822.1	2,249.9	2,852,372	444.66	1,268	171.236 (3.9%)	64,653	0.814	98.8%	0.65%	79.8
	Espírito Santo	ES	Vitória	46,077.5	17,791	3,885,049	76.25	218	107.329 (2.2%)	29,996	0.771	99%	0.48%	80.1
	Goiás	GO	Goiânia	340,086.7	131,310	6,523,222	17.65	49	123.926 (2.4%)	20,134	0.737	97%	0.9%	75.9
	Maranhão	MA	São Luís	331,983.3	128,180	6,850,884	19.81	53	58.920 (1.2%)	8,760	0.676	90%	1.9%	72.5
	Mato Grosso	MT	Cuiabá	903,357.9	348,790	3,224,357	3.36	9	80.830 (1.5%)	25,945	0.736	94%	1.3%	74.6
	Mato Grosso do Sul	MS	Campo Grande	357,125.0	137,890	2,619,657	6.86	19	54.471 (1.0%)	21,744	0.742	97%	0.7%	76.1
	Minas Gerais	MG	Belo Horizonte	586,528.3	226,460	20,734,097	33.41	91	403.551 (9.2%)	20,324	0.774	98.6%	0.61%	78.7
	Pará	PA	Belém	1,247,689.5	481,740	8,073,924	6.07	16	91.009 (1.9%)	11,678	0.690	94%	1.6%	74.2
	Paraíba	PB	João Pessoa	56,439.8	21,792	3,943,885	66.70	180	38.731 (0.8%)	10,151	0.698	92%	1.7%	74.1
	Paraná	PR	Curitiba	199,314.9	76,956	11,081,692	52.40	143	255.927 (5.8%)	24,194	0.769	98%	0.7%	77.8
	Pernambuco	PE	Recife	98,311.6	37,958	9,277,727	89.62	244	117.340 (2.3%)	13,138	0.719	92%	1.9%	74.8
	Piauí	PI	Teresina	251,529.2	97,726	3,194,178	12.4	32	25.721 (0.5%)	8,137	0.690	90%	1.8%	72.7
	Rio de Janeiro	RJ	Rio de Janeiro	43,696.1	16,871	16,461,173	365.23	975	504.221 (11.5%)	31,064	0.762	99%	1.3%	77.1
	Rio Grande do Norte	RN	Natal	52,796.8	20,385	3,408,510	59.99	167	39.544 (0.9%)	12,249	0.728	95.1%	1.38%	76.7
	Rio Grande do Sul	RS	Porto Alegre	281,748.5	108,780	11,207,274	37.96	103	277.658 (6.3%)	25,779	0.771	99%	0.4%	79.3
	Rondônia	RO	Porto Velho	237,576.2	91,729	1,748,531	6.58	19	29.362 (0.6%)	13,075	0.700	94.6%	1.85%	73.7
	Roraima	RR	Boa Vista	224,299.0	86,602	496,936	2.01	5	7.314 (0.2%)	15,557	0.699	94.5%	1.51%	73.5
	Santa Catarina	SC	Florianópolis	95,346.2	36,813	6,727,148	65.27	182	177.276 (4.0%)	27,771	0.792	99%	0.30%	81
	São Paulo	SP	São Paulo	248,209.4	95,834	44,035,304	166.23	459	1,408.904 (32.1%)	33,624	0.806	99%	0.45%	79.8
	Sergipe	SE	Aracaju	21,910.3	8,459.6	2,219,514	94.36	262	27.823 (0.6%)	13,180	0.702	93%	1.8%	73.0
	Tocantins	TO	Palmas	277,620.9	107,190	1,496,880	4.98	13	19.530 (0.4%)	13,775	0.731	94%	1.7%	74.5

===== Municipalities of Brazil =====
Municipalities of Brazil

- Capital of Brazil: Brasília
- Cities of Brazil

=== Demography of Brazil ===
Demographics of Brazil For demographics data, see chart presented under "States of Brazil", above.

== Government and politics of Brazil ==
Politics of Brazil

- Form of government: federal presidential representative democratic republic
- Capital of Brazil: Brasília
- Elections in Brazil
- Political parties in Brazil

=== Branches of government ===
Government of Brazil

==== Executive branch of the government of Brazil ====
- Head of state and Head of government: President of Brazil
- Cabinet of Brazil

==== Legislative branch of the government of Brazil ====
- National Congress of Brazil (bicameral)
  - Upper house: Senate of Brazil
  - Lower house: Chamber of Deputies of Brazil

==== Judicial branch of the government of Brazil ====
Court system of Brazil

===== State-level judiciary =====
- Trial courts
- Courts of Justice of Brazil

===== Federal-level judicial branch =====
Federal courts of Brazil

- Supreme Federal Court

====== Superior courts ======
- Superior Court of Justice
- Superior Labor Court
- Superior Electoral Court

====== Second instance Courts ======
- Regional Labor Courts
- Regional Electoral Courts
- Regional Federal Courts

====== First instance courts ======
- Brazil Labor Courts
- Brazil Electoral Courts
- Brazil Federal Courts
- Brazil Military Courts

=== Foreign relations of Brazil ===
Foreign relations of Brazil

- Diplomatic missions in Brazil
- Diplomatic missions of Brazil

==== International organization membership ====
The Federative Republic of Brazil is a member of:

- African Development Bank Group (AfDB) (nonregional member)
- Agency for the Prohibition of Nuclear Weapons in Latin America and the Caribbean (OPANAL)
- Andean Community of Nations (CAN) (associate)
- Bank for International Settlements (BIS)
- Central American Integration System (SICA) (observer)
- Community of Portuguese Language Countries (CPLP)
- Food and Agriculture Organization (FAO)
- Group of 15 (G15)
- Group of 24 (G24)
- Group of 77 (G77)
- Group of Twenty Finance Ministers and Central Bank Governors (G20)
- Inter-American Development Bank (IADB)
- International Atomic Energy Agency (IAEA)
- International Bank for Reconstruction and Development (IBRD)
- International Chamber of Commerce (ICC)
- International Civil Aviation Organization (ICAO)
- International Criminal Court (ICCt)
- International Criminal Police Organization (Interpol)
- International Development Association (IDA)
- International Federation of Red Cross and Red Crescent Societies (IFRCS)
- International Finance Corporation (IFC)
- International Fund for Agricultural Development (IFAD)
- International Hydrographic Organization (IHO)
- International Labour Organization (ILO)
- International Maritime Organization (IMO)
- International Mobile Satellite Organization (IMSO)
- International Monetary Fund (IMF)
- International Olympic Committee (IOC)
- International Organization for Migration (IOM)
- International Organization for Standardization (ISO)
- International Red Cross and Red Crescent Movement (ICRM)
- International Telecommunication Union (ITU)
- International Telecommunications Satellite Organization (ITSO)
- International Trade Union Confederation (ITUC)
- Inter-Parliamentary Union (IPU)
- Latin American Economic System (LAES)
- Latin American Integration Association (LAIA)
- Multilateral Investment Guarantee Agency (MIGA)
- Nonaligned Movement (NAM) (observer)
- Nuclear Suppliers Group (NSG)
- Organisation for the Prohibition of Chemical Weapons (OPCW)
- Organization of American States (OAS)
- Permanent Court of Arbitration (PCA)
- Rio Group (RG)
- Southern Cone Common Market (Mercosur)
- União Latina
- Union of South American Nations (UNASUR)
- United Nations (UN)
- United Nations Conference on Trade and Development (UNCTAD)
- United Nations Educational, Scientific, and Cultural Organization (UNESCO)
- United Nations High Commissioner for Refugees (UNHCR)
- United Nations Industrial Development Organization (UNIDO)
- United Nations Institute for Training and Research (UNITAR)
- United Nations Integrated Mission in Timor-Leste (UNMIT)
- United Nations Mission for the Referendum in Western Sahara (MINURSO)
- United Nations Mission in Liberia (UNMIL)
- United Nations Mission in the Central African Republic and Chad (MINURCAT)
- United Nations Mission in the Sudan (UNMIS)
- United Nations Operation in Cote d'Ivoire (UNOCI)
- United Nations Peacekeeping Force in Cyprus (UNFICYP)
- United Nations Stabilization Mission in Haiti (MINUSTAH)
- Universal Postal Union (UPU)
- World Confederation of Labour (WCL)
- World Customs Organization (WCO)
- World Federation of Trade Unions (WFTU)
- World Health Organization (WHO)
- World Intellectual Property Organization (WIPO)
- World Meteorological Organization (WMO)
- World Organisation for Animal Health (OIE)
- World Tourism Organization (UNWTO)
- World Trade Organization (WTO)

=== Law and order in Brazil ===
Law of Brazil

- Capital punishment in Brazil
- Constitution of Brazil
- Corruption in Brazil
- Crime in Brazil
- Human rights in Brazil
  - LGBT rights in Brazil
  - Freedom of religion in Brazil
- Law enforcement in Brazil
- List of scandals in Brazil

=== Military of Brazil ===
Military of Brazil

- Command
  - Commander-in-chief: President of Brazil, Luiz Inácio Lula da Silva
    - Ministry of Defence of Brazil
- Forces
  - Army of Brazil
  - Navy of Brazil
  - Air Force of Brazil
- Military history of Brazil
- Military ranks of Brazil

=== Local government in Brazil ===
Local government in Brazil

== History of Brazil ==
- Colonial Brazil
- Kingdom of Brazil
- United Kingdom of Portugal, Brazil and the Algarves
- Empire of Brazil
- First Brazilian Republic
- Vargas Era
- Second Brazilian Republic
- Brazilian military government
- Economic history of Brazil
- Military history of Brazil

== Culture of Brazil ==
Culture of Brazil

- Architecture of Brazil
  - Architecture schools in Brazil
- Cuisine of Brazil
- Languages of Brazil
- National symbols of Brazil
  - Coat of arms of Brazil
  - Flag of Brazil
  - National anthem of Brazil
- People of Brazil
  - Austrian Brazilians
  - English Brazilians
  - German Brazilians
  - Italian Brazilians
  - Japanese Brazilians
  - Swiss Brazilians
- Prostitution in Brazil
- Public holidays in Brazil
- Religion in Brazil
  - Buddhism in Brazil
  - Christianity in Brazil
  - Hinduism in Brazil
  - Islam in Brazil
  - Judaism in Brazil
- World Heritage Sites in Brazil

=== Art in Brazil ===
- Brazilian art
- Cinema of Brazil
- Literature of Brazil
- Music of Brazil
- Television in Brazil

=== Sports in Brazil ===
Sports in Brazil

- Football in Brazil
- Brazil at the Olympics

== Economy and infrastructure of Brazil ==
Economy of Brazil

- Economic rank, by nominal GDP (2016): 9th (ninth)
- Agriculture in Brazil
- Banking in Brazil
  - Bank of Brazil
- Communications in Brazil
  - Internet in Brazil
    - Latin America and Caribbean Network Information Centre
- Companies of Brazil
- Currency of Brazil: Real
  - ISO 4217: BRL
- Economic history of Brazil
- Energy in Brazil
  - Energy policy of Brazil
- Health care in Brazil
- Industry in Brazil
- Mining in Brazil
- São Paulo Stock Exchange
- Tourism in Brazil
- Transport in Brazil
  - Airports in Brazil
  - Rail transport in Brazil
- Water supply and sanitation in Brazil

== Education in Brazil ==
Education in Brazil

== Health in Brazil ==
Health in Brazil

- MORHAN: Movimento de Reintegração das Pessoas Atingidas pela Hanseníase, Movement of Reintegration of Persons Afflicted by Hansen's disease

== See also ==
Brazil

- List of Brazil-related topics
- List of international rankings
- Member state of the Group of Twenty Finance Ministers and Central Bank Governors
- Member state of the United Nations
- Latin America
- Outline of South America
- Index of Brazil-related articles
- Brazilian government website (in English)
- Lists of country-related topics
- Topic outline of geography
- Topic outline of South America
