= Religion in Brazil =

Religion in Brazil (2022 census)
1. Catholicism (Note: Does not include the Brazilian Catholic Apostolic Church, which broke away from Rome in 1945.) (56.8%)
2. Protestantism (26.9%)
3. No religion (9.28%)
4. Spiritism (1.84%)
5. Afro-Brazilian religions (1.05%)
6. Other religions (4.07%)
7. Not stated (0.17%)

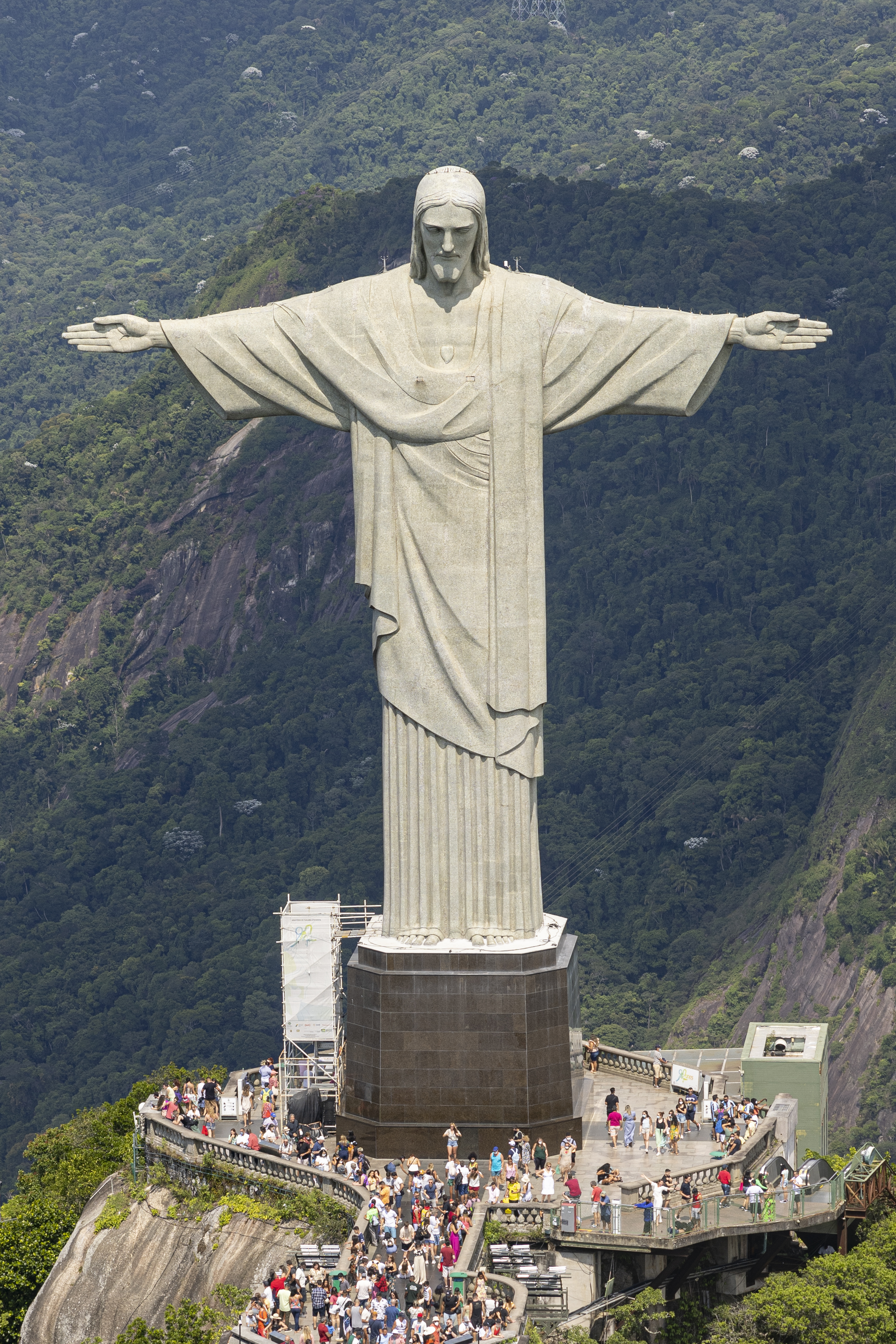
Statue of Christ the Redeemer in Rio de Janeiro

The predominant religion in Brazil is Christianity, with Catholicism being its largest denomination.

In 1891, when the first Brazilian Republican Constitution was set forth, Brazil ceased to have an official religion and has remained secular ever since, though the Catholic Church remained politically influential into the 1970s. The constitution of Brazil guarantees freedom of religion and strongly prohibits the establishment of any religion by banning government support or hindrance of religion at all levels.

== Overview ==
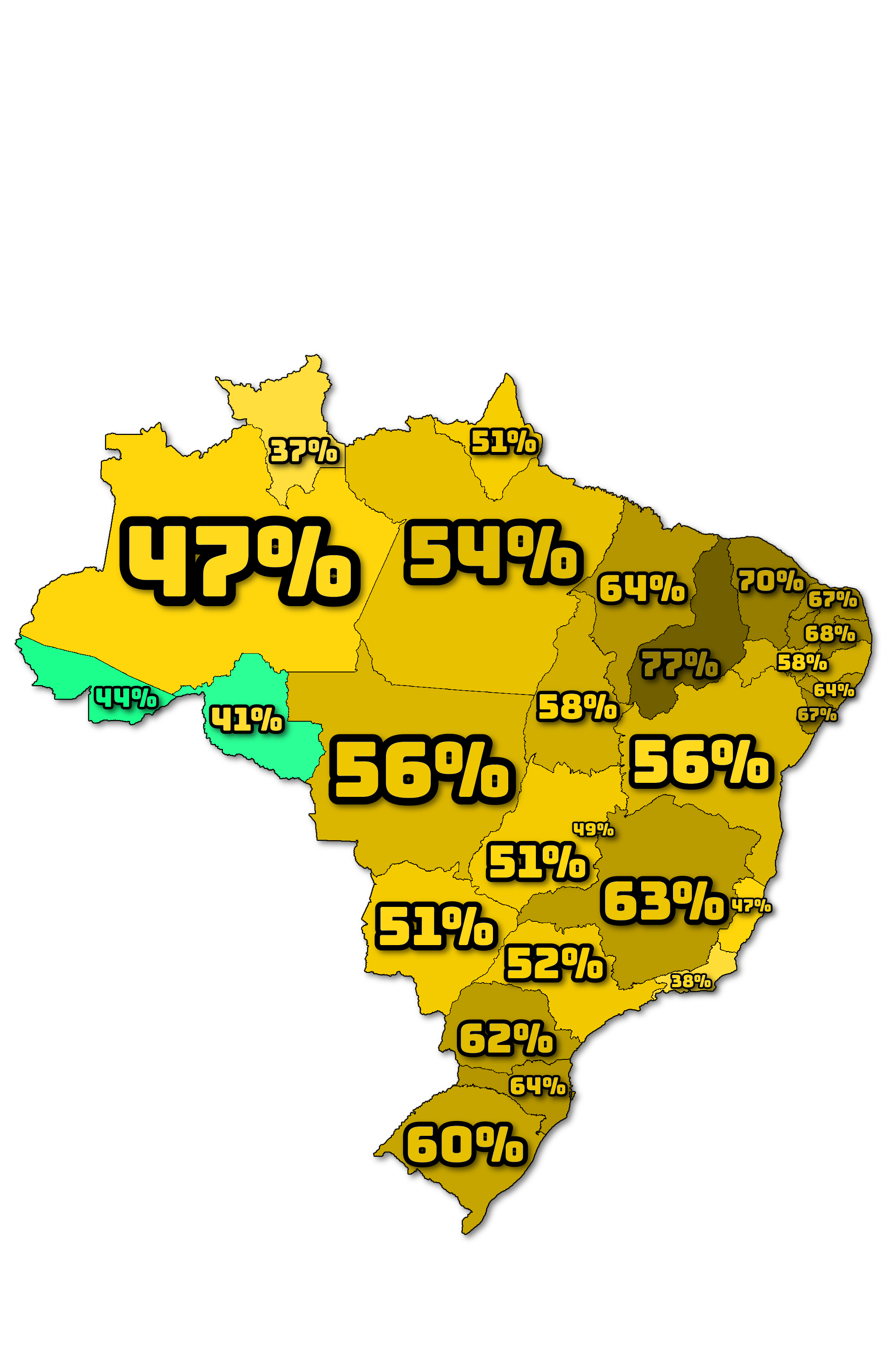
Christianity, the majority religion, in Brazil. Catholicism in yellow, Protestantism in green.

Brazil possesses a richly spiritual society formed from the meeting of the Catholic Church with the religious traditions of enslaved Africans and indigenous people. This confluence of faiths during the Portuguese colonization of Brazil led to the development of a diverse array of syncretistic practices within the overarching umbrella of Brazilian Catholicism, characterized by traditional Portuguese festivities. Until recently, Catholicism was overwhelmingly dominant. Changes in the 21st century have led to a growth in secularism (no religious affiliation) and to Evangelical Protestantism. The 2022 census indicates that around 57% of Brazilians consider themselves Catholic, down from 90% in 1970. Despite falling in most of the country, Catholicism remains strong in most of the Northeast. Some analysts have projected Protestants to possibly outnumber Catholics around 2030, with the Catholic Church membership dropping to 38.6%, the Protestant membership in hundreds of independent denominations rising to 39.8%, and the non-Christian population (including the non-affiliated) rising to over 20%. Others have noted a slowing pace in the growth of Protestantism.

In the 2022 census, 56.75% of the population declared themselves as Catholic, 26.85% as Protestant, 9.28% as non-religious, and 6.9% as followers of other religions (mostly Spiritists or Kardecists who follow the doctrines of Allan Kardec, Umbandists, Candomblers, Jehovah's Witnesses, the Church of Jesus Christ of Latter-day Saints (LDS Church), and minorities of Buddhists, Jews, Muslims, and other groups). In ARDA's 2020 study, Spiritists were the second-largest religion practiced among the Brazilian population at 4.83%. Other religions also includes the Baha'i Faith, Buddhism, Chinese folk religions, Afro-Brazilian religions, Hinduism, Judaism, Islam, and new religious movements.

Brazilian religions are very diversified and inclined to syncretism, with exception to most Protestants. In recent decades, there has been a great increase of Neo-Pentecostal churches and in Afro-Brazilian religions, which had decreased the number of members of the Roman Catholic Church as of 2000. The number of Umbandists and Candomblers could be significantly higher than the official census figure since many of them continue to this day to disguise their religion under "Catholic" syncretism. About 90% of Brazilians declared some sort of religious affiliation as of 2004.

Religious intolerance is a crime in Brazil, and several laws ensure freedom of worship and protection for those who profess their faith. The Federal Constitution of 1988 (Arti.5, Clause IV) guarantees that "freedom of conscience and belief is inviolable, ensuring the free exercise of religious cults and guaranteeing, in accordance with the law, the protection of places of worship and their liturgies." As of 2024, however, Evangelical Protestant and Charismatic religious intolerance against non-Evangelicals has grown. Evangelical Protestants, specifically, have also been reported as most intolerant in Brazil.

The Brazilian Penal Code (Decree-Law 2,848/1940), establishes as a crime the act of "publicly mock[ing] someone based on their beliefs or religious function, stop[ping] or disturb[ing] a religious ceremony or practice, or publicly disrespect[ing] acts or objects of religious worship." The penalty for these acts is imprisonment for one month to one year or a fine. Law n. 14.532/2023 added paragraph three to Article 140 of the Penal Code, which determines that, in the case of the crime of insult, if it consists of elements related to religion or the condition of an elderly or disabled person, the penalty for the crime will be imprisonment for one to three years and a fine.

== Christianity ==
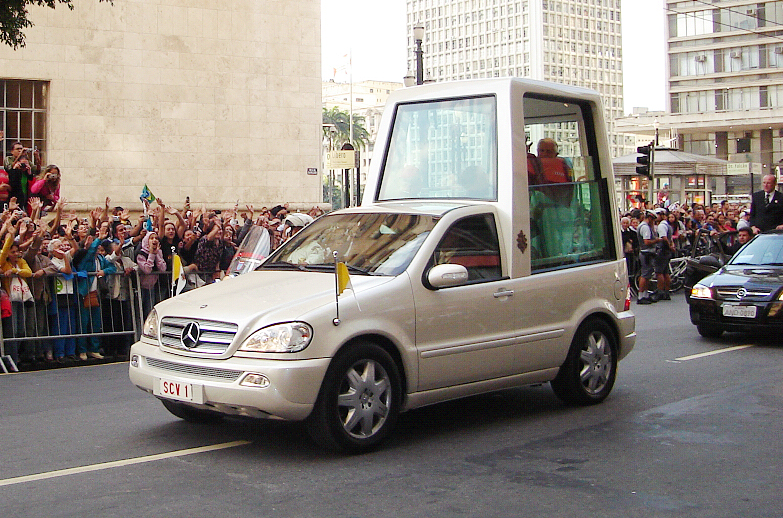
Pope Benedict XVI and Popemobile during the official visit in São Paulo

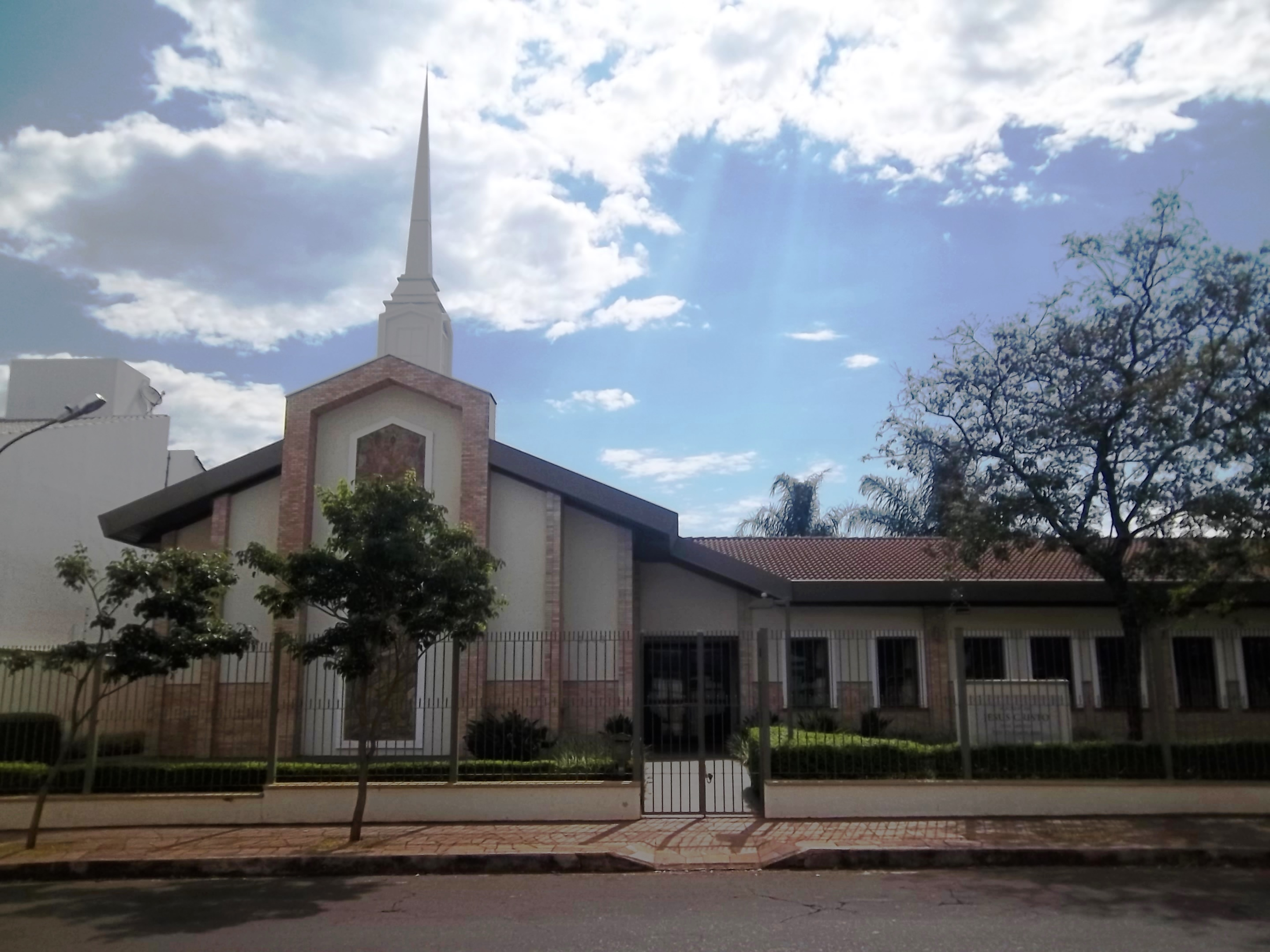
A typical chapel of The Church of Jesus Christ of Latter-day Saints in Brazil

=== Catholicism ===
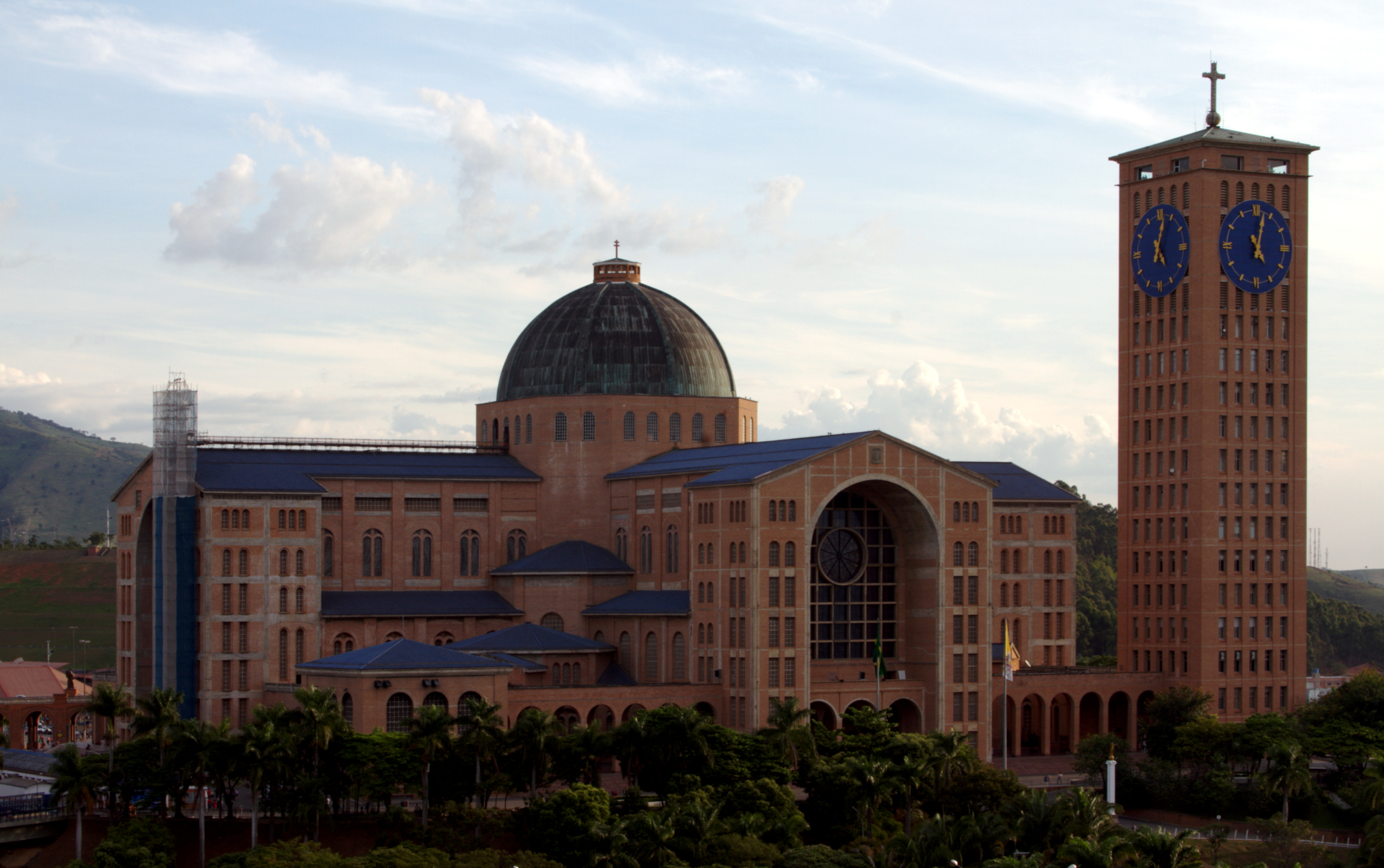
The Basilica of the National Shrine of Our Lady of Aparecida

Brazil has the largest number of Catholics in the world. Catholicism has been Brazil's main religion since the beginning of the 16th century. It was introduced among the Native Brazilians by Jesuit missionaries during colonial times, there was no freedom of religion. All Portuguese settlers and Brazilians were compulsorily bound to the Catholic faith and were bound to pay tithes to the church. After Brazilian independence, the first constitution introduced freedom of religion in 1824, but Catholicism was kept as the official religion. The Imperial Brazilian government paid a salary to Catholic priests and influenced the appointment of bishops. The political-administrative division of the municipalities accompanied the hierarchical division of the bishoprics in "freguesias" (parishes). There were also some hindrances to the construction of temples and cemeteries that belonged to the Catholic Church. The first Republican Constitution in 1891 separated religion from state and made all religions equal in the Codes of Law, but the Catholic Church remained very influential until the 1970s. For example, due to the strong opposition of the Catholic Church, divorce was not allowed in Brazil until 1977 even if a separated couple observed a different religion.

The Catholic faith practiced in Brazil is full of popular festivities rooted in centuries-old Portuguese traditions, but also heavily influenced by African and Native Brazilian usage. Popular traditions include pilgrimages to the National Shrine of Our Lady of Aparecida (Nossa Senhora Aparecida), the patron saint of Brazil, and religious festivals like the "Círio de Nazaré" in Belém and the "Festa do Divino" in many cities of Central Brazil. Areas that received many European immigrants in the last century, especially Italian and German, have Catholic traditions closer to that practiced in Europe.

As of 2008, the largest proportion of Catholics is concentrated in the Northeast (59%) and South (53%) regions. The smallest proportion of Catholics is found in the Center-West region (49%). The State of Piauí has the largest proportion of Catholics (85%) and the State of Rio de Janeiro has the smallest one (45.19%). Among the state capitals, Teresina has the largest proportion of Catholics in the country (86.010%), followed by Aracaju, Fortaleza, Florianópolis and João Pessoa.

Alternatively, in the 20th century, former Catholic bishop Carlos Duarte Costa founded the Brazilian Catholic Apostolic Church after disagreements with clerical celibacy and other doctrines.

=== Protestantism ===
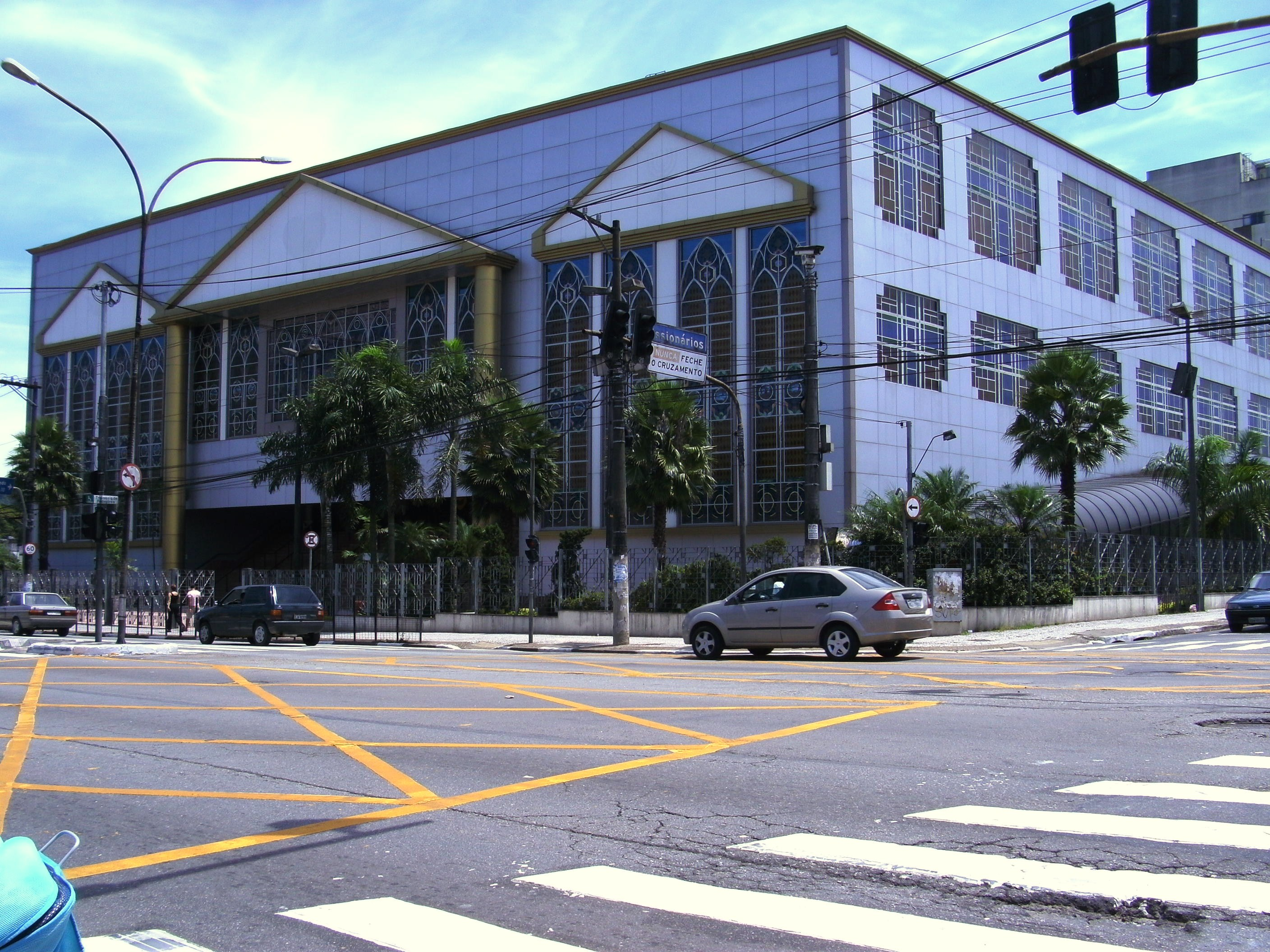
Universal Church of the Kingdom of God in São Paulo

Protestantism in Brazil largely originated with American missionaries in the second half of the 19th century, following up on efforts that began in the 1830s. Evangelical Protestantism and Pentecostalism have grown very rapidly in Brazil since the 20th century, with American religio-political missionary influence, funded by American businesspeople, religious leaders, denominations, politicians, and the CIA. The 2010 census reported that 22.2% of the Brazilian population was Protestant, or about 44 million people. Brazil has many versions of Protestantism. These include neo-Pentecostals, old Pentecostals, and Traditional Protestants (most of them Baptists, Presbyterians and Methodists) predominantly from Minas Gerais to the South. The Anglican Episcopal Church of Brazil, part of the Anglican Communion, has some 120,000 members. Centers of neo-Pentecostalism are Londrina in Paraná state, as well the cities of São Paulo, Rio de Janeiro and Belo Horizonte (capital of Minas Gerais), especially the suburban and nearby areas of these cities. Lutherans are concentrated mostly in the states of Rio Grande do Sul, Santa Catarina and in countryside regions of the states of Rio de Janeiro and Espírito Santo.

As of the year 2000, the largest proportion of Protestants was found in North (19.8%), Central-West (18.9%) and Southeast (17.5%) regions. Among the state capitals, Rio de Janeiro has the largest proportion of non-Pentecostal Protestants in the country (10.07%), followed by Vitória, Porto Velho, Cuiabá and Manaus. But Goiânia is the state capital with the largest proportion of Pentecostal Protestants in the country (20.41%), followed by Boa Vista, Porto Velho, Belém and Belo Horizonte. A 2023 IPSOS survey found that 38% of Brazilians identified as Catholic and 29% as Protestant, and a 2020 ARDA survey estimated that 70.57% of its population was Catholic and 15.12% Protestant.

While Catholicism was politically dominant before the secularization of Brazil, Protestants have been involved in influencing Brazilian and international politics; Evangelical Protestant influence has also been implicated in the attempted 2022 Bolsonarist coup. Following Bolsonaro's 2024 indictment, the country's Evangelical Caucus threatened a reactionary response. Overall, Evangelicals, like their Catholic counterparts, began reconsidering religion as a political factor in elections as of 2025, though some have continued efforts to influence Brazilian society into 2026.

=== Eastern Orthodoxy ===
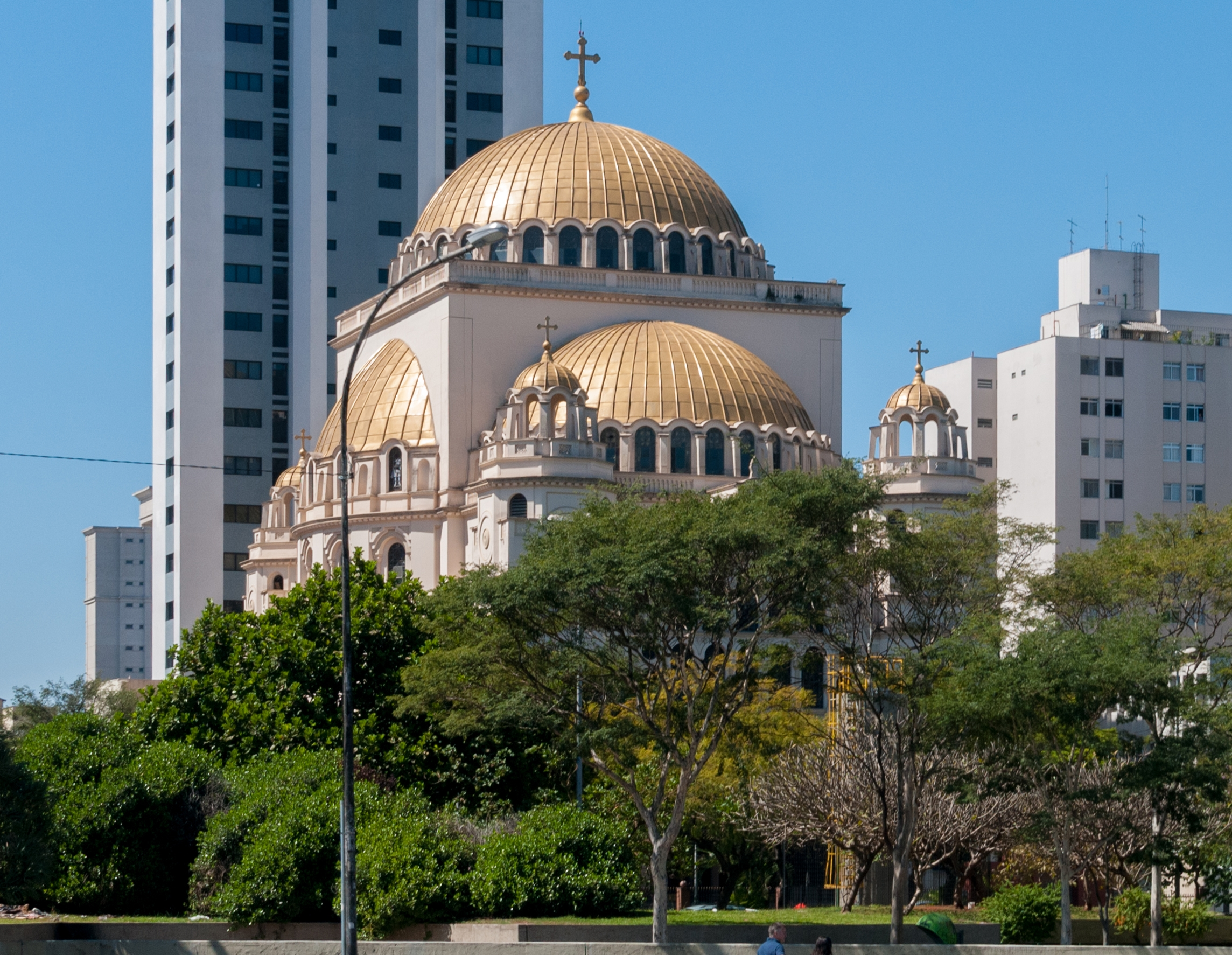
Metropolitan Orthodox Cathedral, Vila Mariana, São Paulo

The Eastern Orthodox Church is also present in Brazil. Among the canonical churches in the country are the:

- Antiochian Orthodox Church
- Polish Orthodox Church
- Serbian Orthodox Church
- Russian Orthodox Church
- Ecumenical Patriarchate (and the Ukrainian Autocephalous Orthodox Church in Diaspora)

The Orthodox Metropolitan Cathedral, located in São Paulo, is the See of the Archdiocese of the Church of Antioch in São Paulo. It is an example of Byzantine architecture that can be appreciated in South America. Its construction, which began in the 1940s, was inspired by the Basilica of Hagia Sophia of Istanbul and was inaugurated in January 1954. According to IBGE, there were 131,571 Orthodox Christians in Brazil.

=== Oriental Orthodoxy ===
Oriental Orthodoxy in Brazil comprises the Armenian Apostolic Church, Coptic Orthodox Church of Alexandria, Syriac Orthodox Church, and Ethiopian Orthodox Tewahedo Church. These communities largely developed through immigration from the Middle East, the Caucasus, and Africa between the late 19th and early 20th centuries, particularly in the context of the decline of the Ottoman Empire collapse and related regional upheavals. They are primarily concentrated in the state of São Paulo, where they have established parishes and ecclesiastical jurisdictions serving both immigrant populations and converts.

=== Jehovah's Witnesses ===
In 2022, according to the denomination, Brazil had 909,879 Jehovah's Witnesses with 12,439 congregations and a ratio of 1 Witness to 238 residents. However, the 2010 census reported nearly 1.4 million people listed themselves as members.

=== The Church of Jesus Christ of Latter-day Saints ===
The Latter Day Saint movement arrived in Brazil in 1913 through German immigrants, but proselytizing efforts only began in 1929. The LDS Church, the largest church in the movement, is the fastest-growing church in Brazil in terms of membership. According to the religious institution's records, it has about 1.5 million members, making Brazil the third country in the world with the most members, behind only the United States and Mexico. As of 2024, the church had 36 missions, 2,172 congregations, 21 temples, and 524 Family History Centers.

According to the church's doctrine, adherents perform sacred ordinances in the temple, such as vicarious baptism, celestial marriage, and family sealing, in addition to being places of learning and spirituality. Only baptized and worthy members who have a current temple recommend are allowed to enter the temples. The church also holds worship meetings on Sundays in its chapels throughout Brazil, which are open to the public.

The church is active in community assistance in Brazil, notably through the "Helping Hands" program. This initiative mobilizes members and volunteers in activities such as blood donation, food drives, support after natural disasters, health and education campaigns, and revitalization of public spaces. The church undertakes these actions to contribute to the well-being of its members and local communities.

They are part of the Restorationist branch of Christianity and not affiliated with other Christian denominations.

== Religious minorities ==
There are small populations of people professing Buddhism, Judaism, Islam, Shinto, Rastafari and many other religions. They comprise 21st century immigrants from East Asia, the Middle East, or of recent immigrant descent.

=== African and indigenous religions ===
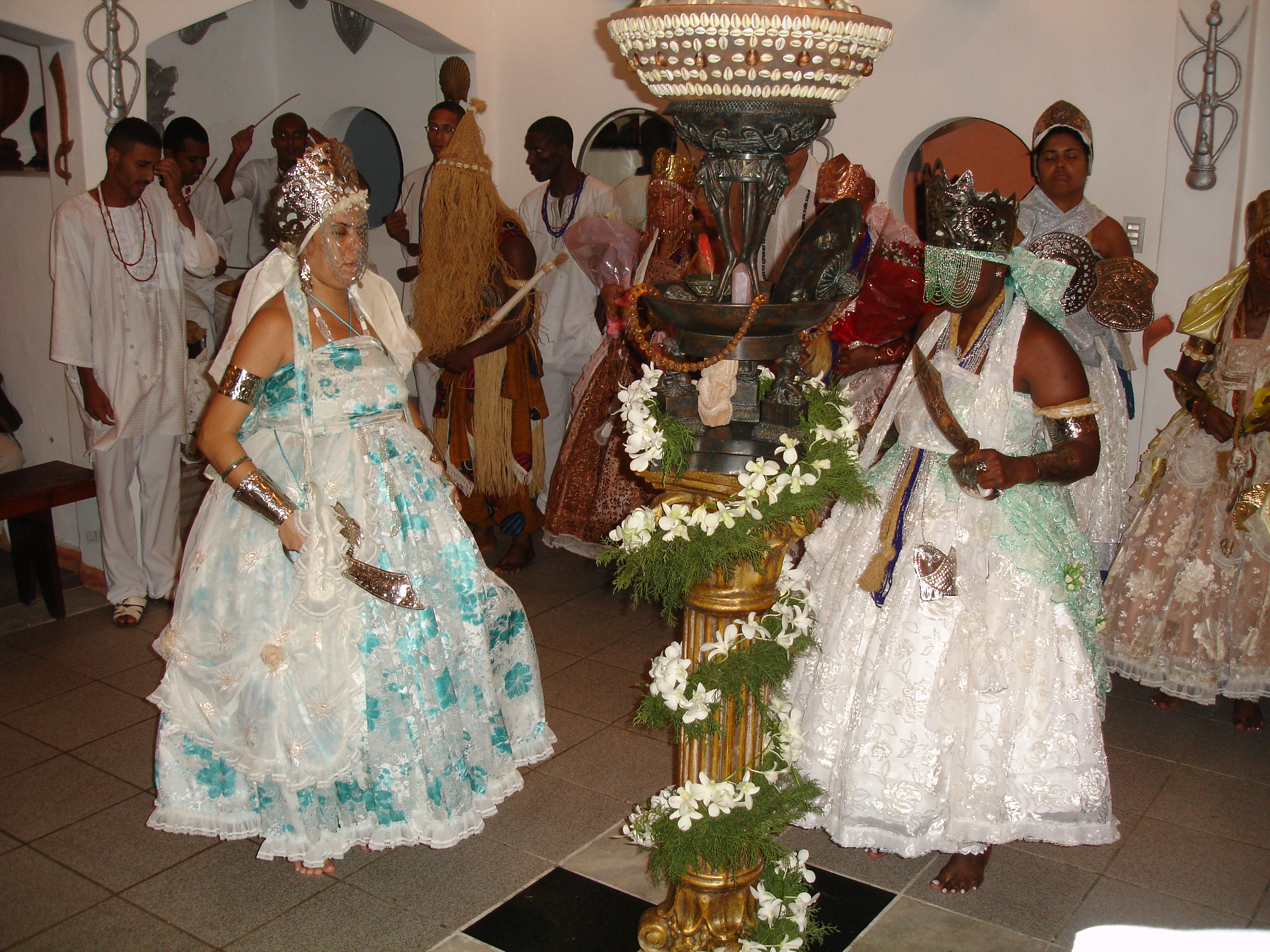
People during a celebration of Orisha, in Candomblé of Ile Ase Ijino Ilu Orossi

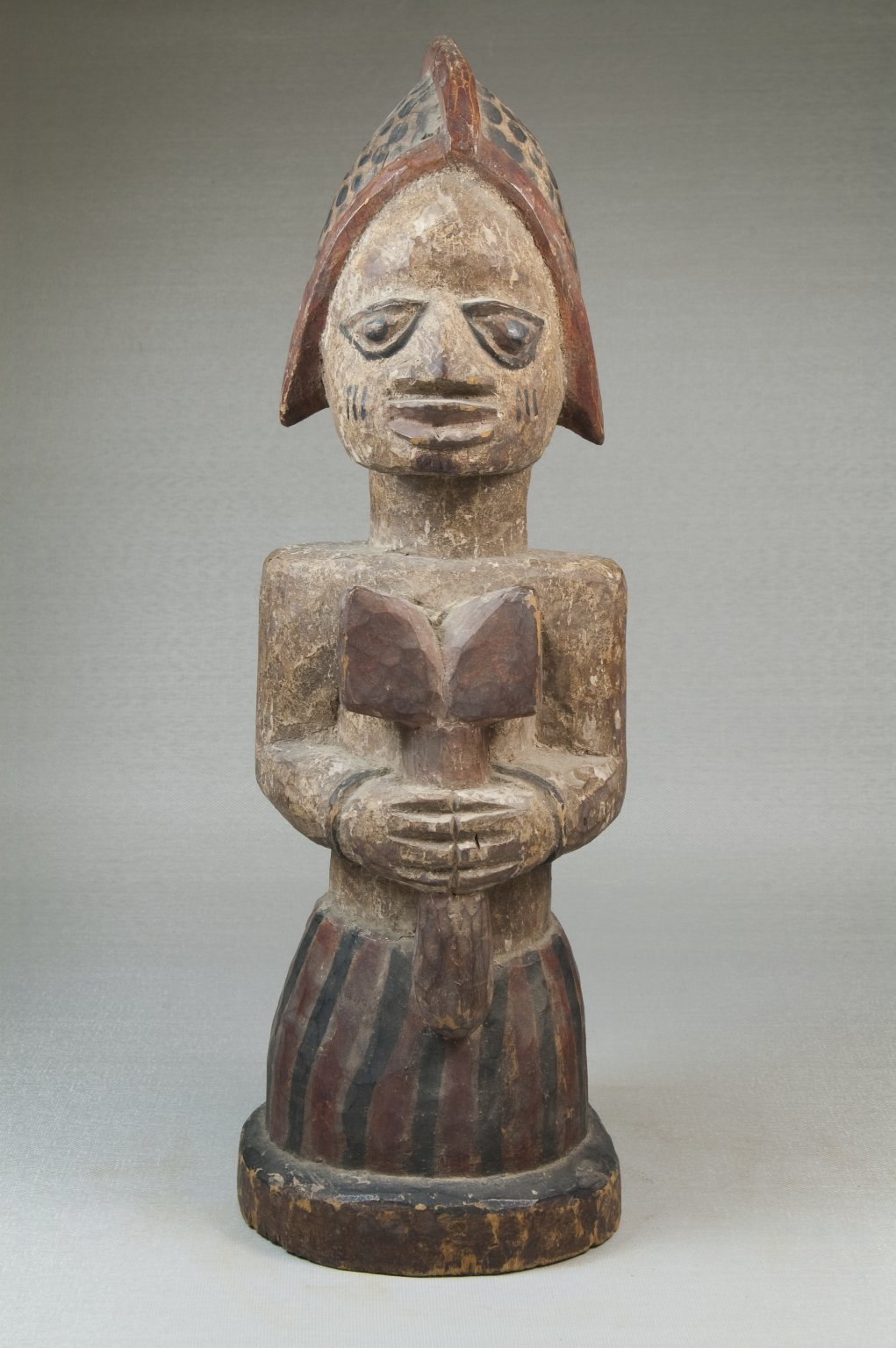
Figure of a Devotee of Shango Holding an Oshe Shango, Brooklyn Museum

Afro-Brazilian religions are syncretic religions, such as Candomblé, that have many followers, mainly Afro-Brazilians. They are concentrated mainly in large urban centers in the Northeast, such as Salvador, Recife, or Rio de Janeiro in the Southeast.

Candomblé, Umbanda, Batuque, Xango, and Tambor de Mina are Afro-Brazilian religions influenced by the native cults brought by black slaves shipped from Africa to Brazil. These black slaves would summon their gods, called Orixas, Voduns, or Inkices with chants and dances they had brought from Africa; they upheld that these gods were morally ambiguous. These cults were persecuted throughout most of Brazilian history, largely because they were believed to be pagan or even satanic. However, the Brazilian republic government legalized all of them on the grounds of the necessary separation between the state and the church in 1889.

Candomblé arose through a process of syncretism between several of the traditional religions of West Africa, especially that of the Yoruba, and the Roman Catholic form of Christianity. Umbanda blends African traditions with Roman Catholicism, Spiritism, and Indigenous American beliefs. There are also Catholics, Protestants, and other kinds of Christians who hold a dual belief system and go to both churches and terreiros (temples), the places where the rituals run.

The cities of São Paulo, Porto Alegre and Florianópolis have a great number of followers. In the South of Brazil the most common African influenced ritual is Almas e Angola, similar to Umbanda. There are over 70 terreiros in Florianópolis.

In current practice, Umbanda followers leave offerings of food, candles, and flowers in public places for the spirits. Candomblé terreiros have similar practices, and there are a number of festivals that occur yearly especially in the Northeast, with celebrations such as the famous Iyemanja Festival and the Waters of Oxala.

From Bahia northwards there are different practices such as Catimbo and Jurema with heavy indigenous elements. All over the country, but mainly in the Amazon rainforest, there are many Indians still practicing their original traditions. Many of their beliefs and use of naturally occurring plant derivatives are incorporated into African, Spiritualists, and folk religions.

These religions have suffered increasing hostility from Protestant churches, with attacks on temples and the defacement of statues of the gods. There has also been a documented murder of a priestess in 2023. In recent years measures have been taken to counter external religious conflict, although the religions have recently experienced internal conflict regarding sexual abuse, harassment, and threats of spiritual punishment for reporting or abandoning the religions.

=== Spiritism ===
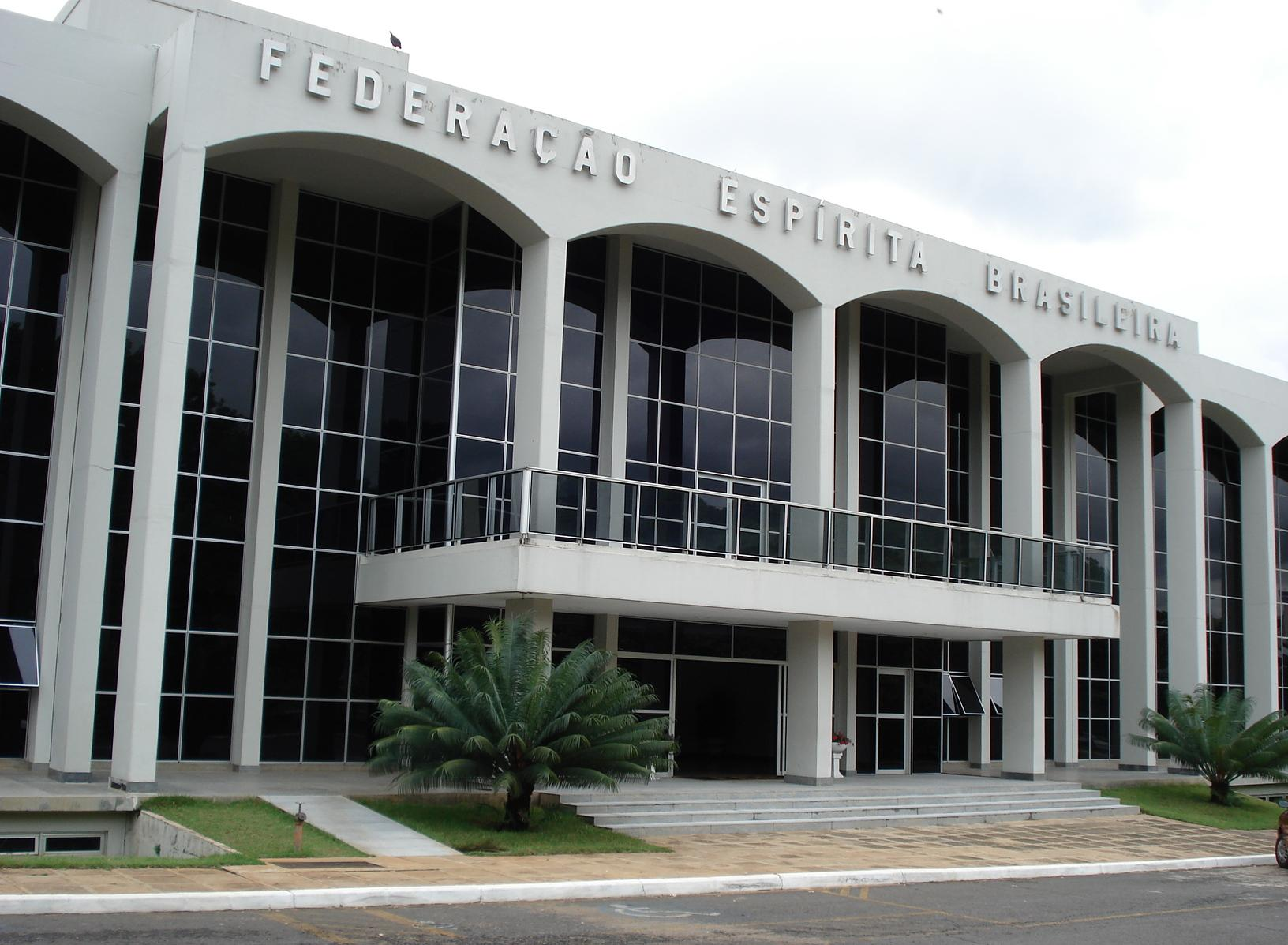
Seat of Federação Espírita Brasileira

Spiritism is a religion, founded in the 19th century by the French educator Allan Kardec, which proposes the study of "the nature, origin, and destiny of spirits, and their relation with the corporeal world". Spiritism follows Jesus's moral teachings, and therefore its status as a non-Christian religion is an object of debate between its followers and mainstream Christians. It is the largest non-Christian religion in Brazil as of 2020. It studies topics such as life after death, reincarnation, spirits, moral teachings and much more.

=== Buddhism ===
Tibetan Buddhist temple in Três Coroas, Rio Grande do Sul

Buddhism is probably the largest of all minority religions, with about 215,000 followers, and, as of 2020, forming 0.25% of the religious population. Brazil is home to the third-largest Buddhist population in the Americas, after the United States and Canada. This is mostly because of the large Japanese Brazilian community. About a fifth of the Japanese Brazilian community are followers of Buddhism. Japanese Buddhist sects like Jodo Shinshu, Nichiren Buddhism (most notably the Soka Gakkai), and Zen are the most popular. Tibetan Buddhism (Vajrayana) is also present, since Chagdud Tulku Rinpoche founded the Khadro Ling center in Três Coroas, Rio Grande do Sul (where he lived until his death in 2002), and many other institutions across the country. However, in recent years both Chinese Mahayana and South East Asian Theravāda sects are gaining popularity. Buddhism was introduced to Brazil in the early twentieth century, by Japanese immigrants, although now, 60% of Japanese Brazilians are now Christian due to missionary activities and intermarriage. Nevertheless, Japanese Brazilian culture has a substantial Buddhist influence. A number of Buddhist organizations and groups are also active in Brazil, with nearly 150 temples spread across the states.

=== Judaism ===
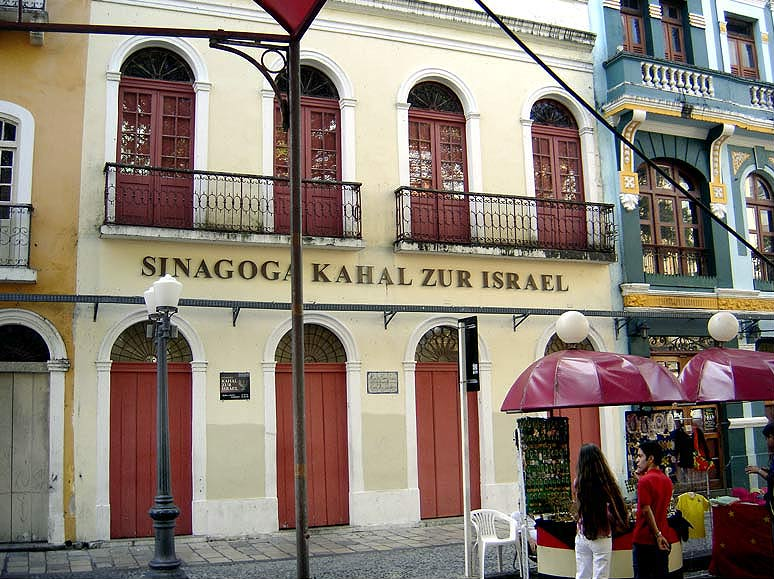
Kahal Zur Israel Synagogue, (founded 1636) in Recife, was the first Jewish congregation in the Americas.

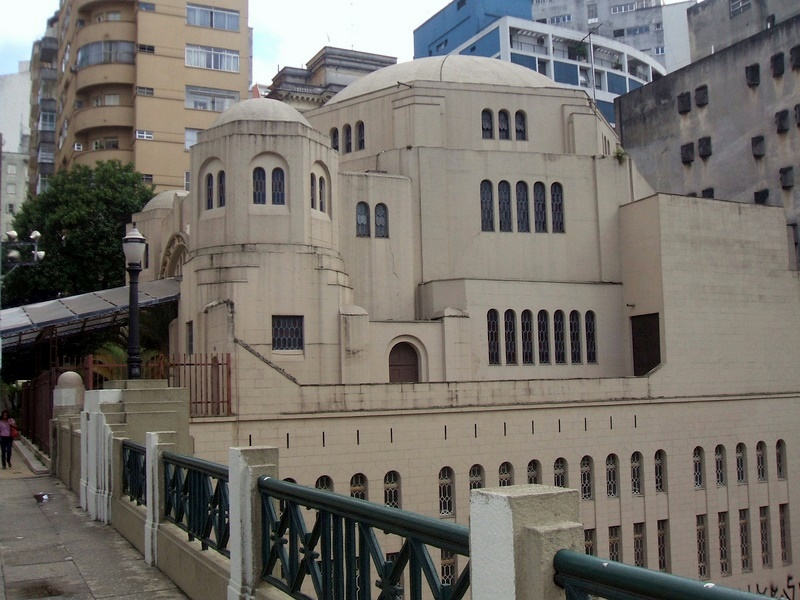
A synagogue in São Paulo

The first Jews arrived in Brazil as cristãos-novos (New Christians) or conversos, names applied to Jews or Muslims who converted to Catholicism, most of them forcibly. According to the Inquisition reports, many New Christians living in Brazil during colonial times were condemned for secretly observing Jewish customs.

In 1630, the Dutch conquered portions of northeast Brazil and permitted the open practice of any religion. Many Jews came from the Netherlands to live in Brazil in an area dominated by the Dutch. Most of them were descendants of the Portuguese Jews who had been expelled from Portugal in 1497. In 1636, the Kahal Zur Israel Synagogue, the first synagogue in the Americas was built in Recife, the capital of Dutch Brazil. The original building remains to this day, but the Jews were forced to leave Brazil when the Portuguese-Brazilians retook the land in 1654.

The first Jews that stayed in Brazil and openly practiced their religion came when the first Brazilian constitution granted freedom of religion in 1824, just after the independence. They were mainly Moroccan Jews.

The first wave of Sephardic Jews was exceeded by the larger wave of immigration by Ashkenazi Jews that came at the end of the 19th and beginning of the 20th centuries, mainly from Russia, Poland, Belarus and Ukraine. A final significant group came, fleeing Nazism or the destruction that followed World War II.

Brazil has the second-largest Jewish population in Latin America of 120,000 people, making up a total of 0.06% of Brazil's population in 2010. As of 2017, Rio de Janeiro's Jewish population was 22,000, with 24 active synagogues and São Paulo has a Jewish population of 44,000.

=== Islam ===
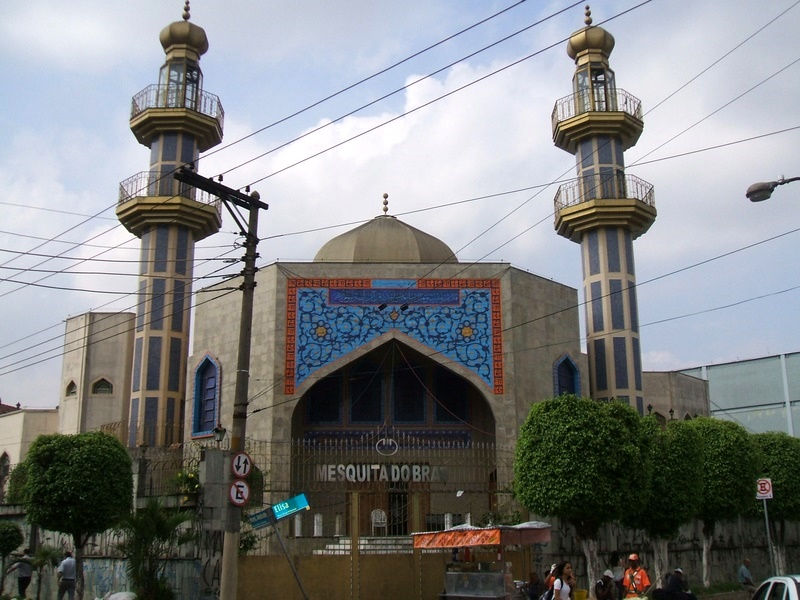
Mosque in São Paulo

By Pew in 2010, there were 204,000 Muslims in Brazil, representing 0.1% of the total population. The Federation of Muslim Associations of Brazil estimates there are about 1.5 million Muslims and others say about 400,000 to 500,000. There are over 150 mosques where Muslims perform their daily prayers.

Islam in Brazil may be presumed to have first been practiced by African slaves brought from West Africa. Scholars note that Brazil received more enslaved Muslims than anywhere else in the Americas. During Ramadan, in January 1835, a small group of Black slaves and freedmen from Salvador da Bahia, inspired by Muslim teachers, rose up against the government in the Malê Revolt, the largest slave rebellion in Brazil. (Muslims were called malê in Bahia at this time, from Yoruba image that designated a Yoruba Muslim.) Fearing the example might be followed, the Brazilian authorities began to watch the malês very carefully and in subsequent years intensive efforts were made towards conversions to Catholic Christianity and erase the popular memory of and affection towards Islam. However, the African Muslim community was not erased overnight, and as late as 1910 it is estimated there were still some 100,000 African Muslims living in Brazil.

A recent trend has been the increase in conversions to Islam among non-Arab citizens.

=== Hinduism ===
Most of the Brazilian Hindus are ethnic East Indians. However, there are new converts due to the missionary effects of Hare Krishnas.

There are as many as 1500 PIOs in the Indian community in Brazil, and only 400 NRIs since foreign nationals can acquire local citizenship without any discrimination after 15 years of domicile in this country. Brazil has also no bar against dual citizenship. But in recent years, it has been granting immigration visas only in high technology fields. The only exceptions are the Sindhis in Manaus (who have formed an Indian Association with about a hundred members) and the Goans in São Paulo.

Besides the PIOs, there are Hindu organizations such as ISKCON as well as Brahma Kumaris which are very active in Brazil. The number of adherents of these organizations is not officially recorded but is estimated to be a few thousand. The Vedic Astrology, vedanga of Hinduism, is increasingly popular in Brazil, especially by the efforts of the Academia Brasileira de Astrologia Védica (ABAV) which promotes this branch of the Vedic culture in the country.

According to the 2000 census, there were about 2,905 Hindus in Brazil. According to the 2011 census, there were about 9,500 Hindus in Brazil constituting 0.005% of the population of Brazil.

Historical Hindu Population
Year	Pop.	±%
2000	2,905	—
2011	9,500	+227.0%

Year	Percent	Increase
2000	-%	-
2011	0.005%	+0.005%

=== Positivist Church of Brazil ===
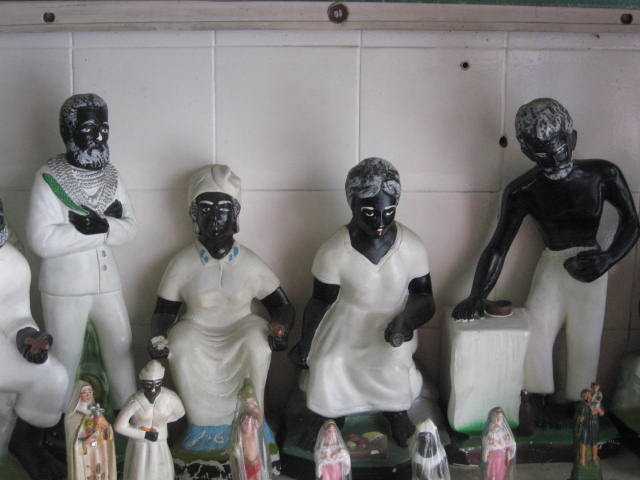
Old Black women and men spirits images

Many confuse Spiritism with Afro-Brazilian Religions like Umbanda, Candomblé, and others that have a following of almost 600,000 adherents. One of the most unusual features of the rich Brazilian spiritual landscape are the sects that use ayahuasca (an Amazonian entheogenic tea), including Santo Daime, União do Vegetal, and Centro de Cultura Cósmica. This syncretism, coupled with ideas prevalent during the military dictatorship, has resulted in a church for the secular, based on philosopher Auguste Comte's principles of positivism, based at the Positivist Church of Brazil in Rio de Janeiro.

=== Baháʼí Faith ===
The Baháʼí Faith in Brazil started in 1919 with Baháʼís first visiting the country that year, and the first Baháʼí Local Spiritual Assembly in Brazil was established in 1928. There followed a period of growth with the arrival of coordinated pioneers from the United States finding national Brazilian converts and in 1961 an independent national Baháʼí community was formed. During the 1992 Earth Summit, which was held in Brazil, the international and local Baháʼí community were given the responsibility for organizing a series of different programs, and since then the involvement of the Baháʼí community in the country have continued to multiply. The Association of Religion Data Archives (relying on World Christian Encyclopedia) estimated some 42,100 Baháʼís in Brazil in 2010.

=== Japanese new religions ===
There are, in Brazil, many followers of Japanese new religions like Oomoto, PL Kyodan, Seicho-no-Ie and the Church of World Messianity. The total number of adherents, if merged, is maybe in the hundreds of thousands.

== Beliefs ==
A 2009 poll, made by Datafolha and published in newspaper Folha de S. Paulo, asked diverse questions about the beliefs of the Brazilian people. In this poll, 64% reported to be Catholics, 17% Pentecostal Protestants, 5% non-Pentecostal Protestants, 3% Kardecists or Spiritists, 3% followers of other religions, 7% non-religious or atheists. Less than 1% reported to follow Afro-Brazilian religions.

Belief in God and the Devil

- 97% of Brazilians reported believing in God; 2% have doubts and 1% do not believe in God.
- 75% reported believing in the Devil, 9% have doubts and 15% do not believe in the Devil.
- 81% of those non-religious reported believing in God.

About Jesus Christ

- 93% Reported they believe Jesus Christ rose after death; 92% that the Holy Spirit exists; 87% in the occurrence of miracles; 86% that Mary gave birth to Jesus as a virgin; 77% that Jesus will return to Earth at the end of time; 65% that the sacramental bread is the body of Jesus; 64% that after death some people go to Heaven; 58% that after death some people go to Hell and 60% that there is life after death.

Belief in saints

- 57% Believe there are saints.
- 49% Pray for the intercession of a saint (68% among self-declared Catholics).
- 18% Pray for the intercession of Our Lady of Aparecida (26% among Catholics); Saint Anthony, Saint Expeditus (5% each), Saint George (3%), Saint Jude, Saint Francis of Assisi and Saint Joseph (2% each).

About the Catholic priests

- 51% Believe some priests respect chastity, 31% most, 8% none, and 4% they all do.
- 66% That priests should be allowed to marry (59% among Catholics and 94% among followers of Candomblé).
- About the sexual abuse scandals involving priests, 38% believe some of the complaints are true, 30% most are, 21% all are and 4% none of them.

About different religions

- About the sentence "Catholics do not practice their religion", 19% reported agreeing completely and 41% agreed, but not completely.
- About the sentence "the Protestants are misled by their priests", 61% agreed (77% among the Kardecists, 67% among Catholics and 45% among Protestants).
- About the sentence "Umbanda is a Devil thing", 57% agreed (83% among Evangelical Protestants, 53% among Catholics and 12% among Umbandists).
- About the sentence "Jews only think about money", 49% agreed. 51% disagreed.
- About the sentence "Muslims advocate terrorism", 49% agreed. 51% disagreed.

== Freedom of religion ==
In 2023, the country was scored 4 out of 4 for religious freedom; it was noted Afro-Brazilian religious groups face considerable discrimination and violence.

== Regional data ==
Religion in Brazil by State in the 2010 census
Region	Catholic (%)	Protestant (%)	Spiritism (%)	Afro-Brazilian religion (%)	Other (%)	Irreligion (%)	Asian religions (%)
Piauí	85.1	9.7	0.3	0.1	1.4	3.4	0.0
Alagoas	79.2	9.9	0.5	0.1	6.5	4.7	0.1
Ceará	78.8	14.6	0.6	0.0	1.8	4.0	0.2
Paraíba	77.0	15.1	0.6	0.1	1.4	5.7	0.1
Sergipe	76.4	11.8	1.1	0.2	1.9	8.1	0.5
Rio Grande do Norte	76.0	15.4	0.8	0.0	1.4	10.4	0.0
Maranhão	74.5	17.2	0.2	0.0	1.5	6.3	0.3
(Santa Catarina (state)) Santa Catarina	73.1	20.0	1.2	0.2	1.8	3.3	0.4
Minas Gerais	70.4	20.2	2.1	0.0	2.3	3.9	1.1
Rio Grande do Sul	68.8	18.3	3.2	1.5	2.3	5.3	0.6
Tocantins	68.3	23.0	0.2	0.0	2.2	5.9	0.4
(Paraná (state)) Paraná	67.7	22.2	1.0	0.0	2.6	4.6	2.9
Pernambuco	65.9	20.3	1.4	0.1	1.8	10.4	1.7
Bahia	65.2	17.4	1.1	0.3	4.0	12.0	0.0
Brazil	64.6	22.2	2.0	0.1	3.1	8.0	2.2
Pará	63.7	25.8	0.4	0.1	2.1	7.0	0.9
Amapá	63.5	28.0	0.4	0.0	2.3	5.5	0.3
Mato Grosso	63.4	24.5	1.3	0.1	3.0	6.6	1.1
(São Paulo (state)) São Paulo	60.1	24.1	3.3	0.3	4.1	5.1	3.0
Goiás	58.8	28.1	2.5	0.0	2.5	8.1	0.0
(Amazonas (Brazilian state)) Amazonas	58.3	31.2	0.4	0.0	2.9	6.0	1.2
Mato Grosso do Sul	57.4	26.5	1.9	0.0	3.0	9.2	2.0
(Federal District (Brazil)) Federal District	56.6	25.8	3.5	0.2	3.7	9.2	1.0
Espírito Santo	52.2	33.1	1.0	0.2	2.0	10.4	1.1
(Acre (state)) Acre	51.9	32.7	0.6	0.0	2.9	11.8	0.1
Roraima	47.9	30.3	0.9	0.1	6.6	13.0	1.2
Rondônia	47.6	33.8	0.6	0.0	3.7	13.3	1.0
(Rio de Janeiro (state)) Rio de Janeiro	45.8	29.4	4.0	0.9	4.3	14.6	1.0

== See also ==
- Demographics of Brazil
- Roman Catholicism in Brazil
- Protestantism in Brazil
- The Church of Jesus Christ of Latter-day Saints in Brazil
- Islam in Brazil
- Judaism in Brazil
- Baháʼí Faith in Brazil
- Hinduism in Brazil
- Buddhism in Brazil
- Religion in Latin America
