= LDS Humanitarian Services =

Charitable services within the Church of Jesus Christ of Latter-day Saints

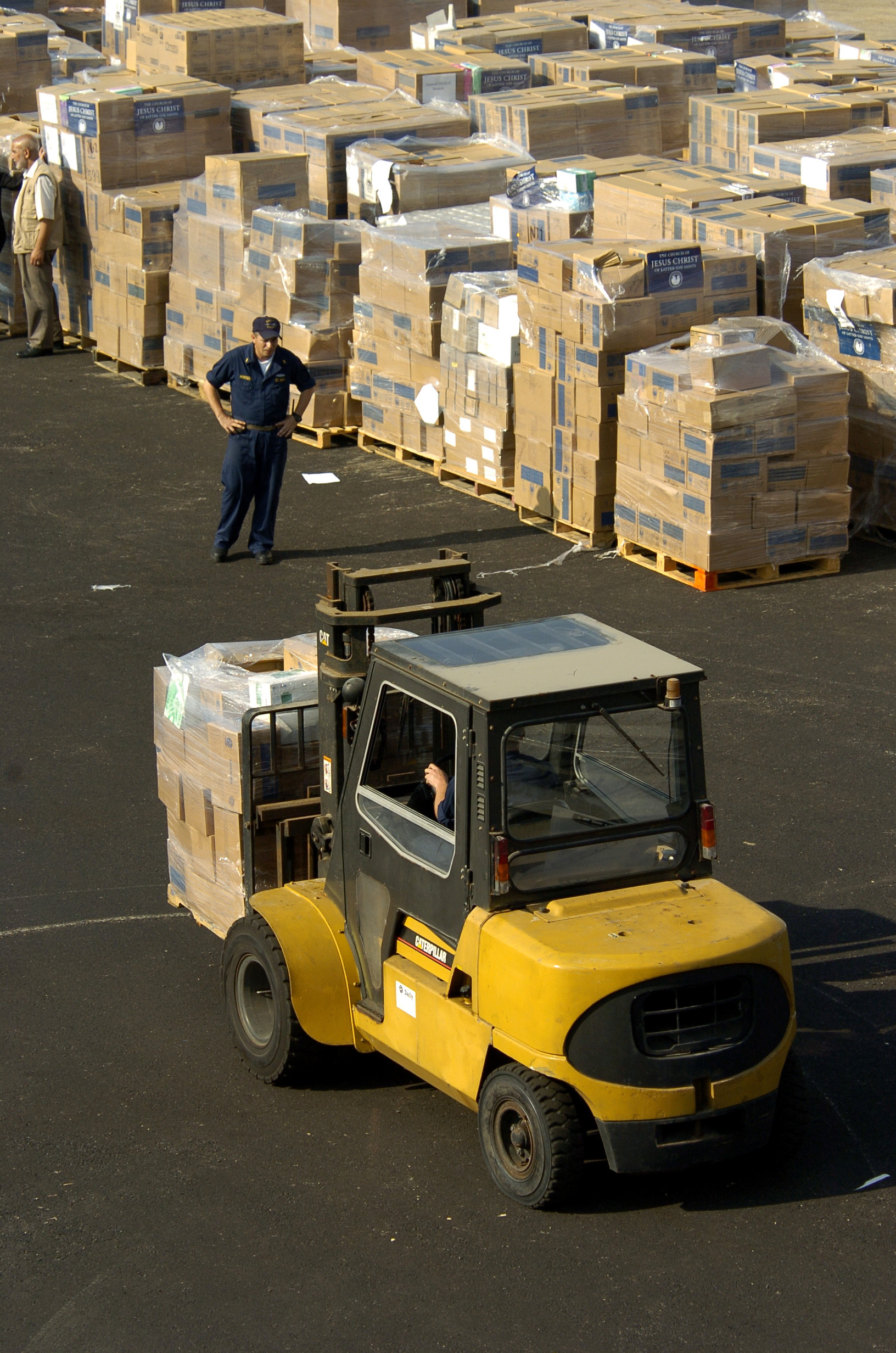
U.S. Navy sailors from the HSV-2 Swift move more than 100 tons of humanitarian aid to the pier at Beirut, Lebanon during the 2006 Israel-Lebanon conflict. The LDS Church donated over $2 million of humanitarian that was disbursed to Lebanese citizens in coordination with the International Islamic Relief Organization.

Latter-day Saint Charities (formerly known as LDS Humanitarian Services) is a branch of the welfare department of the Church of Jesus Christ of Latter-day Saints (LDS Church). The organization's stated mission is to relieve suffering, to foster self-reliance for people of all nationalities and religions, and to provide opportunities for service.

== Overview ==
The LDS Church considers humanitarian work to be an essential part of its mission to bless humanity. In 1842, Joseph Smith, founder of the Latter Day Saint movement, organized the Women's Relief Society, with a primary focus to provide "relief" to suffering members and ultimately to all people. During the Great Depression the LDS Church organized a welfare program, now administered by the church's welfare services department, to help provide for the needs of its members.

LDS Humanitarian Services was created to coordinate these efforts in partnership with government, and other nonprofit agencies around the world. The church's humanitarian work primarily helps those in need who are not members of the church. Key humanitarian initiatives include clean water, vision treatment, wheelchair provision, neonatal resuscitation, and disaster relief. Other initiatives include immunizations, family enrichment programs, and family food production. In 2008, LDS Humanitarian Services provided aid to 3.3 million people in 122 countries, and since 1985 help has been given to 23 million people in 189 nations.

The funding for LDS Humanitarian Services comes from the philanthropic support of the church's members and other donors. Donations to the Humanitarian Fund are collected through local bishops and LDS Philanthropies.

== Humanitarian initiatives ==
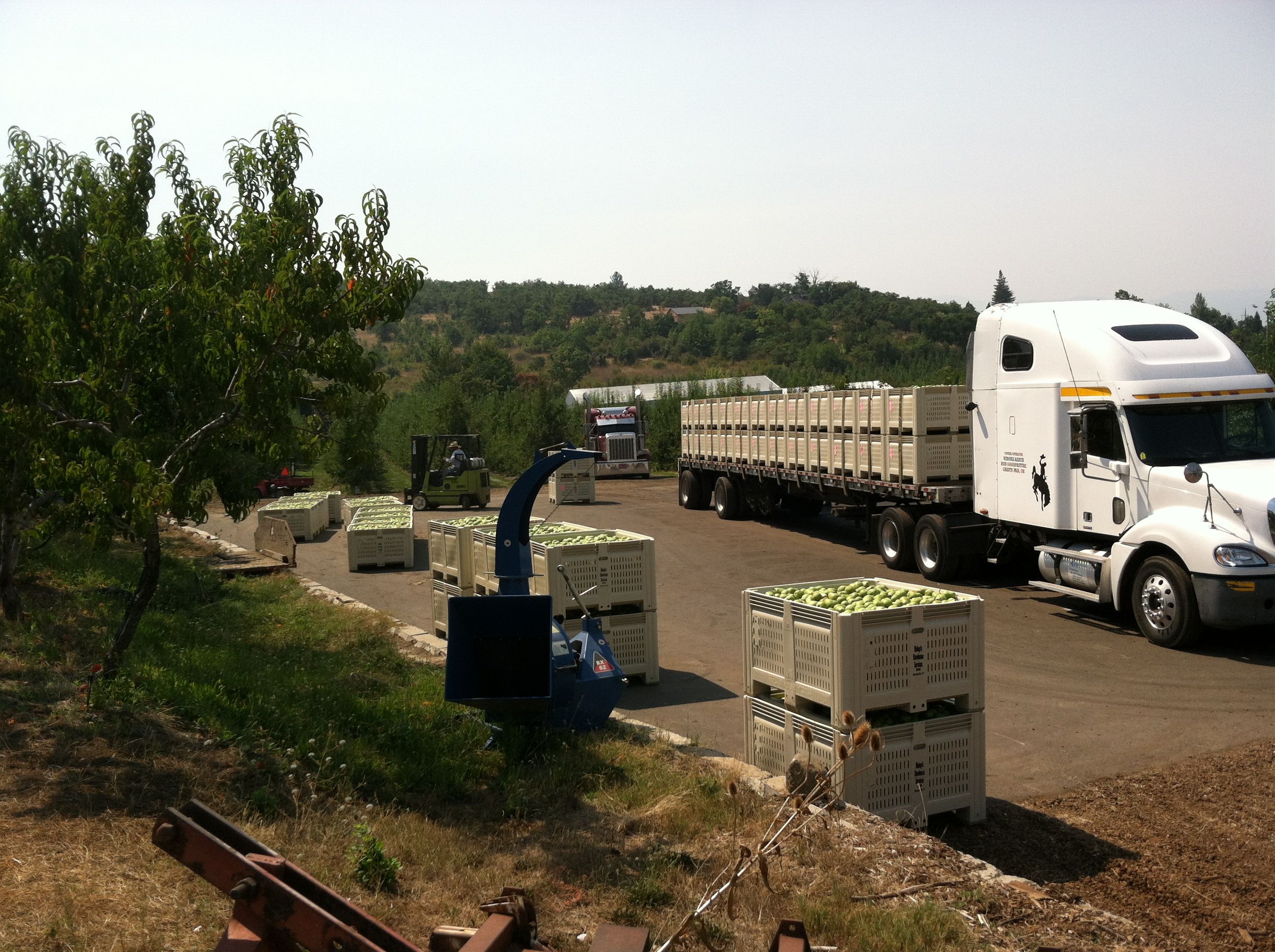
Part of harvest activities at the LDS Medford Pear Orchard, USA.

Emergency Response is the part of the LDS Church's humanitarian efforts of which most people are aware. Funds and supplies in this area are used to help victims of natural disasters such as earthquakes, floods, droughts, tornadoes, and hurricanes, as well as other disasters such as wars or political unrest. Supplies in this area are gathered and stored before a crisis, so supplies can be sent within hours of an emergency. Volunteers are also on call so they can be reached and organized within a few hours, if needed. The LDS Church is renowned for its ability to organize its members in various regions of the world to respond to emergency and facilitate distributing goods immediately after a crisis, often before aid programs such as the Red Cross or the Salvation Army come to assist. In 2008, the LDS Church responded to 124 disasters in 48 countries.

Wheelchair Distribution is another program to help those in need. By providing needed wheelchairs, the church hopes to help people become more self-reliant which is an important tenet of its beliefs.

The Clean Water Service provides clean water and wells to people who otherwise would most likely contract deadly diseases because of the dirty water. It is estimated that one billion people lack clean water. The clean water program is designed to partner with local community agencies to provide sustainable clean water.

The Neonatal Resuscitation program sends doctors and volunteers to areas where infant mortality rate is high. They are able to teach people in the area how to resuscitate newborns, as well as provide simple medical equipment. It is estimated that nearly 1 million newborns die each year due to birth difficulties. Up to 10% of newborns have breathing difficulties.

The Vision Treatment Training program teaches facilities and medical personnel in developing countries how to treat preventable or reversible blindness. There are 37 million people in the world who are blind, and up to 75% of blindness is treatable. The vision care program works with local vision health care centers to help treat and prevent blindness for the poor.

In addition to these efforts, the LDS Church also has over 300 job development and placement centers around the world. In 2001, the church began the Perpetual Education Fund which provides money to cover tuition and other school expenses to people in developing nations. As of 2007, tens of thousands of individuals had been given assistance. So far this program has operated primarily in South America and Oceania. The LDS Church has also begun producing a nutrition-rich porridge, named Atmit, to help during acute famines. The church welfare program owns farms, ranches, canneries, and other food producing facilities to provide temporary food relief for families and individuals. LDS Humanitarian Services frequently works with other charities and NGOs such as the Red Cross, Catholic charities and even various Islamic charities for which the LDS Church has produced halaal food.

From 1985 to 2009, the church reported it gave $327.6 million in cash and $884.6 million in commodities of aid throughout 178 countries.

In February 2021, with the ongoing COVID-19 pandemic, Latter-day Saint Charities announced a pledge of $20 million to support UNICEF in delivering vaccines worldwide. This added to an earlier $3 million donation to assist with food, water, and medical supplies, and represents the largest donation from the private sector to support UNICEF's ACT Accelerator and COVAX work.

In 2022, the church's charitable expenditures exceeded $1.02 billion, an increase of nearly $100 million, up from $906 million in 2021.

== In Africa ==
The church has been involved in several humanitarian aid projects in Africa. On January 27, 1985, members across the world joined together in a fast for "the victims of famine and other causes resulting in hunger and privation among people of Africa." They also donated the money that would have been used for food during the fast to help those victims, regardless of church membership. Together with other organizations such as UNICEF and the American Red Cross, the church worked towards eradicating measles. Since 1999, there has been a 60 percent drop in deaths from measles in Africa. Due to the church's efforts, the American Red Cross gave the First Presidency the organization's highest financial support honor, the American Red Cross Circle of Humanitarians award. The church has also been involved in humanitarian aid in Africa by sending food boxes, ⁣ digging wells to provide clean water, ⁣ distributing wheelchairs, ⁣ providing Neonatal Resuscitation Training, ⁣ and setting up employment resources service centers.

== See also ==
- Deseret Industries
- Mormon Helping Hands
- Mwingi Water Project
- Welfare Square
