= Mwingi Water Project =

The Mwingi Water Project was a 2008 church sponsored project to supply clean potable water in the Mwingi District in Kenya. The project drilled 30 wells to provide water for 56,000 people. This effort is one of several ongoing water projects in the region, sponsored by both the Kenyan government and church based relief organizations.

A humanitarian fund managed by the Church of Jesus Christ of Latter-day Saints (LDS Church) supplied funding and tools for the project, while the wells were dug by Kenyan contractors. Local community members helped in the construction by digging trenches, moving pipe and mixing cement. After receiving appropriate training from LDS Church consultants, a community water committee became responsible for maintaining the wells. A similar water project, also sponsored by the LDS Church, was completed in 1989 in the Ngorika region of Kenya.

== See also ==
- Care for Africa
- Engineers Without Borders (USA)
- The Nobelity Project § Kenyan Water Project
- LDS Humanitarian Services
