= Atmit =

Nutritional supplement

Atmit is a nutritional supplement used to fight famine in impoverished countries. Historically, atmit was used regularly to nourish and support women in their post-partum periods. The richness of protein and calories helped encourage milk production and restore strength to the mother after the exhaustion of labour and significant blood loss post-delivery. It was later found that the cultural and traditional dish that is still used today for women in Ethiopia and across the diaspora could also be used to support undernourished people worldwide. This creamy, nutritious food is indigenous to Ethiopia, and is now used to feed the severely malnourished as well as weakened adults and children.

== Overview ==
The word atmit originated in Ethiopia and refers to a kind of "thin, nourishing porridge." Traditionally, it can contain over 20 different cereals and the recipes can vary widely. Atmit is made from rolled oats, powdered milk, powdered sugar, vitamins, and minerals. It is easily digestible, and is high in protein and calorie content. Since severely malnourished people cannot eat solid food, atmit is an ideal way to get them essential nutrients.

Marta Gabre-Tsadick, the first woman senator from Ethiopia and the co-founder of Project Mercy, Inc., a Christian relief organization, adapted the recipe for production in the United States for shipment to Ethiopia and other African countries. During 1985 and 1986, Project Mercy sent 930 tons of atmit to Ethiopia, where World Vision relief workers used it to prepare millions of meals which they distributed among people weakened from the famine.

Charity and relief organizations have created various formulas for this porridge. The Church of Jesus Christ of Latter-day Saints formula of atmit, which was sent in 2005 to Niger, was made of the following:

- 50% fine oatmeal flour
- 25% nonfat milk
- 20% sugar
- 5% vitamins and minerals

That formula was further developed in 2009 to contain 51% oat flour, 23% nonfat dried milk, and 25% sugar, with the remaining percent composed of a re-developed set of micronutrients designed to improve vitamin shelf life and decrease vitamin degradation. That same year, The Church of Jesus Christ of Latter-day Saints sent 1.4 million pounds of the new atmit formula to Ethiopia.

Recently, atmit has been distributed to Uganda, Sudan, South Africa, Haiti, Gaza, Bangladesh, Indonesia, Sri Lanka, Pakistan, and Niger.
