= Jurema =

Jurema may refer to:

- Jurema, Pernambuco, a municipality in the state of Pernambuco in Brazil
- Jurema, Piauí, a municipality in the state of Piauí in the Northeast region of Brazil
- Jurema River, a river in Ceará, Brazil
- Mimosa tenuiflora, a perennial tree or shrub native to the northeastern region of Brazil
