= List of Brazilian federative units by gross regional domestic product =

Map of the Brazilian federative units by nominal GDP in 2020 in Brazilian real: > 2 trillion > 600 billion > 300 billion / > 150 billion > 80 billion up to 80 billion

In the year 1999, Brazil produced a gross domestic product (GDP) of R$44,403,000 million or US$2,223,737 million in nominal terms, ranking 7th worldwide, and Int$2,896,461 million in Purchasing Power Parity (PPP) terms, ranking 7th worldwide, according to the Brazilian Institute of Geography and Statistics (IBGE) and the International Monetary Fund (IMF). In that year, the Brazilian economy grew 1.0% in real terms according to revised figures of the IBGE. The per capita accounts of the GDP were R$22,813.47 or US$11.521,95 in nominal terms, and Int$14,537.40 in PPP terms. The Brazilian population, in 2012, was 193,300,291, ranking 5th worldwide and totaling 2.84% of the world's population.

Brazil is formed by the union of 27 federative units—26 states and the Federal District, which contains the capital city, Brasília. Of these, seven states; São Paulo, Rio de Janeiro, Minas Gerais, Rio Grande do Sul, Paraná, Bahia and Santa Catarina; with the Federal District, constitute almost 80% of the national economy. São Paulo is the richest and most populous state in Brazil, ranking 16th and 27th worldwide, respectively; Rio de Janeiro is the second richest and the third most populous state, ranking 65th and 59th worldwide; Minas Gerais is the third richest and the second most populous state, ranking 80th and 55th worldwide. Piauí has the lowest GRP per capita at the same time that the Federal District has the highest. Amapá, Acre and Roraima are the poorest states in the country with 0.59% of the national GDP.

== List ==
The listings are based on data from 2026 (for the year 2023), published by the Brazilian Institute of Geography and Statistics (IBGE), in partnership with the State Bodies of Statistics, State Departments of Government and the Superintendency of the Manaus Free Zone (SUFRAMA). Information is compiled from statistics on the annual value of production, intermediate consumption and added value of each economic activity, as well as indicators of growth in the volume of annual production and the annual index of prices of goods and services produced and the main inputs consumed. The methodology and database of the Report are completely integrated into the series of National Accounts, which has as initial reference the year 2002, with results consistent with the National Classification of Economic Activities (CNAE).

Key
^{†}	Major regions
	Sort icon ^{[∗]}

^{∗} Click on the icon to sort the table by any column. If the icon does not appear, click on the column-header.

List of Brazilian federative units and major regions according to nominal terms of GDP and GDP per capita, in both national (Brazilian real) and foreign (United States dollar) currency under current prices, along with their share of the national GDP (2023)
Federative unit	population in millions †	#	GDP in BRL billion	GDP in USD billion	Share	GDP Per capita in BRL	GDP Per capita in USD	#
North Region ^{[†]}	17.9	—	636.551	127.441	5.8%	36.678	7.343	—
Rondônia	1.8	22	76.456	15.307	0.7%	48.353	9.681	10
Acre	0.8	26	26.291	5.264	0.2%	31.675	6.341	17
Amazonas	4	16	161.795	32.391	1.5%	41.048	8.215	14
Roraima	0.5	27	25.125	5.030	0.2%	39.460	7.900	15
Pará	8.3	10	254.547	50.960	2.3%	31.347	6.277	18
Amapá	0.8	25	28.020	5.610	0.3%	38.187	7.645	16
Tocantins	1.5	23	64.318	12.876	0.6%	42.553	8.520	13
Northeast Region ^{[†]}	57.2	—	1.513.055	302.900	13.8%	27.681	5.542	—
Maranhão	7	17	149.227	29.875	1.4%	22.021	4.407	27
Piauí	3.2	21	80.917	16.200	0.7%	24.736	4.952	25
Ceará	9	14	232.239	46.494	2.1%	26.406	5.286	24
Rio Grande do Norte	3.5	20	101.740	20.368	0.9%	30.804	6.168	19
Paraíba	4	19	96.963	18.811	0.9%	24.395	4.883	26
Pernambuco	9.4	12	270.475	54.149	2.5%	29.857	5.978	21
Alagoas	3.4	18	89.689	17.956	0.8%	28.675	5.741	22
Sergipe	2.3	24	60.817	12.176	0.6%	27.519	5.508	23
Bahia	15.3	7	430.988	86.284	3.9%	30.476	6.101	20
Southeast Region ^{[†]}	86.9	—	5.799.492	1.160.990	53%	68.357	13.684	—
Minas Gerais	20.9	3	971.978	194.590	8.9%	47.321	9.473	12
Espírito Santo	3.9	13	209.830	42.008	1.9%	54.732	10.957	9
Rio de Janeiro	16.6	2	1.172.871	234.809	10.7%	73.052	14.624	4
São Paulo	44.8	1	3.444.814	689.652	31.5%	77.566	15.528	2
South Region ^{[†]}	29.6	—	1.834.419	367.229	16.8%	61.274	12.266	—
Paraná	11.2	4	670.919	134.318	6.1%	58.624	11.736	8
Santa Catarina	6.9	6	513.394	102.781	4.7%	67.459	13.504	5
Rio Grande do Sul	11.3	5	650.107	130.152	5.9%	59.736	11.958	7
Central-West Region ^{[†]}	15.8	—	1.159.826	232.183	10.6%	71.200	14.253	—
Mato Grosso do Sul	2.7	15	184.402	36.917	1.7%	66.884	13.389	6
Mato Grosso	3.3	11	273.009	54.656	2.5%	74.620	14.938	3
Goiás	6.7	9	336.747	67.417	3.1%	47.721	9.553	11
Distrito Federal	3	8	365.669	73.207	3.3%	129.790	25.982	1
Total	206	—	10.943.345	2.190.859	100%	53.162	10.642	—

^{∗} The original order of Brazilian states in this list is in accordance with the respective state's number code defined by IBGE.

== See also ==
- States of Brazil
- Economy of Brazil
- List of first-level administrative divisions by GRDP
- List of subnational entities

== Note ==
- Annual average exchange rates used for GDP in US$: According to the UN Countries GDP list, the GDP 2014 of Brazil is R$5,778,953 million or US$2,455,816 million, It is estimated that the average exchange rate was R$2.35317 per US$1 in 2014.
