= Freedom of religion in Brazil =

Freedom of religion in Brazil is a constitutionally protected right, allowing believers the freedom to assemble and worship without limitation or interference. Non-traditional religions are well tolerated in the Brazilian culture.

In 2023, the country was scored 4 out of 4 for religious freedom; it was noted that Afro-Brazilian religious groups face considerable discrimination and violence.

== Population profile ==
- Catholic Christians - 64.6%
- Evangelicals - 22.2%
- Irreligious - 8%
- Spiritism - 2%
- Other religions - 3.2%

== See also ==
- Religion in Brazil
- Catholic Church in Brazil
- Protestantism in Brazil
