= Care for Africa =

Australian non-governmental organisation

- Formation: 2007
- Legal status: Non-profit organization
- Purpose: [[Care for Africa operates in rural communities in Tarime, Tanzania. Care for Africa works in five key areas: water, health, education, empowerment of women and girls and social enterprise. At the core of the organisation’s operations is an emphasis on capacity building to assist communities in breaking their cycle of poverty. Africa]].
- Location: Launceston, Tasmania
- CEO: Diana Butler OAM
- Parent organization: Care for Africa
- Website: Care for Africa website

Care for Africa, registered as the Peter Hewitt Care for Africa Foundation, is an Australian-based, non-government organisation that specialises in international aid in the Tarime District in the Mara Region of Tanzania.

The organisation is registered with the Australian Council for International Development (ACFID) and the Australian Charities and Not-for-profits Commission (ACNC).

Care for Africa was founded in 2007 by a group of emergency nurses at the Launceston General Hospital including emergency nurse and CEO Diana Butler OAM and the late Dr Peter Hewitt, initially in response to a need for medical supplies, as of 2021 the organisation delivers programs in water, health, education and social enterprise.

The organisation is made up of a volunteer board of directors, an operational team of volunteers in Australia and paid staff in Tanzania.

The foundation has participated in many projects in some of the poorest parts of sub sahara Africa—Tarime in the Mara Region of Tanzania. Many more projects have been identified in these areas, including the effective installation of many water bores in schools, water harvesting systems, the building of sanitation blocks, a hand washing programs in the rural schools with soap (which is made by the local women enterprises) and tippy taps, an annual rural school health clinic, breakfast programs at schools, sponsorship of vulnerable children, teacher education, enterprise programs with adult education and the empowerment of women.
