= Mormon Helping Hands =

Latter Day Saint volunteer program

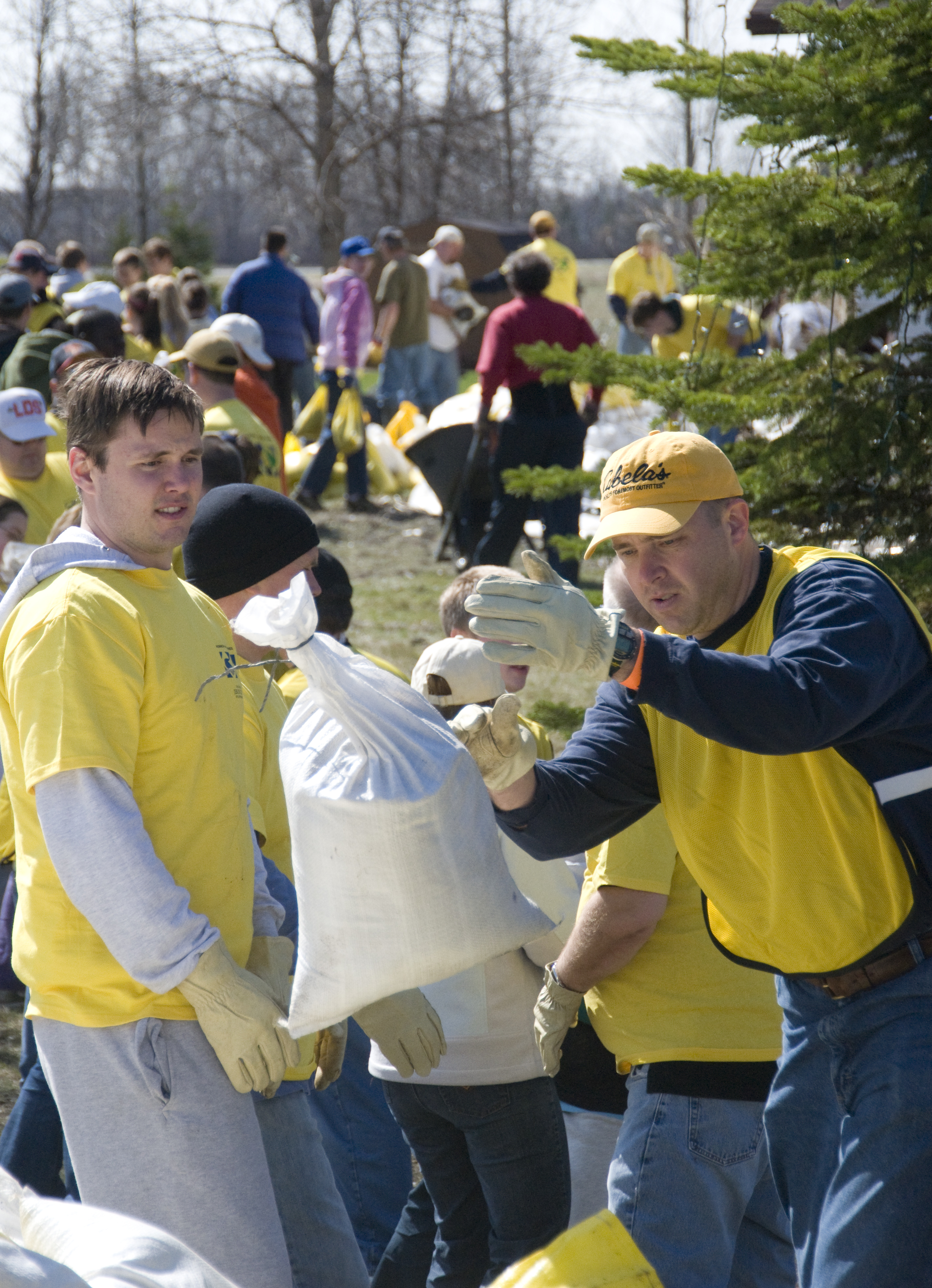
Volunteers wearing yellow Mormon Helping Hands shirts and vests help clear thousands of used sand bags from a Moorhead, Minnesota property on April 25, 2009. Mike Moore/Federal Emergency Management Agency.

Helping Hands (formerly known as Mormon Helping Hands) is a community service volunteer program of The Church of Jesus Christ of Latter-day Saints.

The logos were used in 1992 in South Florida after Hurricane Andrew ravaged the city of Homestead and other parts of Miami-Dade County, Florida. The church officially established the program in 1998 in Argentina, Paraguay, Uruguay, and Chile to identify service being done by members of the LDS Church. That same year it was implemented on a large scale in Brazil as part of a country-wide day of service organized by the church. It has since been used in many countries.

The activities carried out by Helping Hands are diverse and include cleaning, maintenance, and repair projects for public spaces, collecting and distributing donations, job market guidance, health campaigns, and support for victims of natural disasters.

Helping Hands both responds to disasters such as hurricanes and gives aid aimed at improving conditions caused by long-standing problems such as deterioration of parks that lack proper upkeep. In 2017, Mormon Helping Hands was asked to assist local communities in cleaning up from Hurricane Harvey and were featured on the news.

The program is open to everyone, regardless of religious affiliation. People can register through local congregations of The Church of Jesus Christ of Latter-day Saints or via the program's official website, where information about upcoming projects and specific needs is shared.

== See also ==
- LDS Humanitarian Services
- LDS Philanthropies
