= Hinduism in Brazil =

Hindus in Brazil
Total population
- 21,200 (2011) ▲0.01% of total population

Regions with significant populations
- All Over Brazil

Religions
- Hinduism

Related ethnic groups
- Indians in Brazil and Hindus

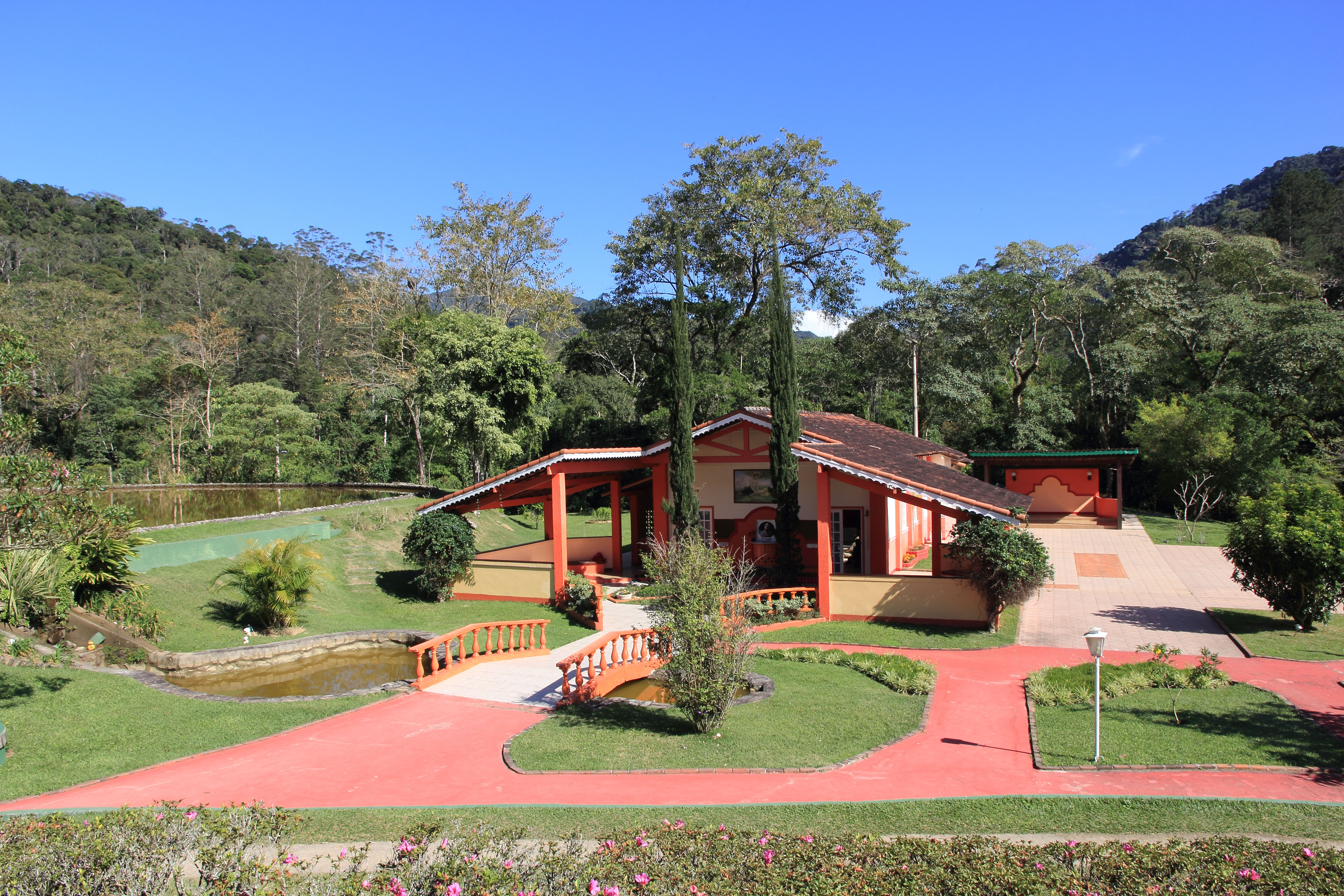
Hare krishna ashram Vrajabhumi in Teresópolis.

Hinduism is a minority faith in Brazil followed by approximately 0.01% of its population. Hinduism in Brazil is represented mainly by Ananda Marga, Brahma Kumaris and the Osho Institute Brazil, ISKCON, Yoga In Bound, Brasil Gaudiya Math and Sri Chaitanya Saraswat Math e Organização Vrinda de Paramadweit. The vedic astrology is also becoming popular due to Academia Brasileira de Astrologia Védica.

== Demographics ==
According to the 2000 census, there were about 2,905 Hindus in Brazil. According to the 2011 census, there were about 9,500 Hindus in Brazil constituting 0.005% of the population of Brazil.

Historical Hindu Population
Year	Pop.	±%
2000	2,905	—
2011	9,500	+227.0%

Year	Percent	Increase
2000	-%	-
2011	0.005%	+0.005%

== Contemporary Society ==
Hare Krishna movement or commonly known as ISKCON, came to Brazil in 1970s- brought by the westerners. ISKCON is the most well-known example of an eastern religion that has no ethnic links. They have great visibility and take active part at environmental, animal rights demonstrations and even during Carnival where they preach, sell books and incense, and invite people to their weekly festivals.

== Incidents of Vandalism ==
In 2018, the entrance gate of ISKCON Temple situated in Curitiba, Brazil was targeted by unknown perpetrators. The painting of Krishna with his mother Yashoda was defaced.

== See also ==
- Hinduism in Guyana
- Hinduism in South America
