= Timeline of Brigham Young University LGBTQ history =

Below is a timeline of major events, media, and people at the intersection of LGBTQ people (Note: LGBTQ is an initialism for lesbian, gay, bisexual, transgender and queer or questioning which functions as an umbrella term broadly referring to all sexualities, romantic orientations, sex characteristics, and gender identities that are not heterosexual, heteroromantic, cisgender, or endosex.) and topics and Brigham Young University (BYU). BYU is the largest university of the Church of Jesus Christ of Latter-day Saints (LDS Church). Before 1959 there was little explicit mention of homosexuality by BYU administration.

== 1940s ==
- 1948 – Gay BYU students Kent Goodridge Taylor and Richard Snow, who were in love visit with church president George Albert Smith who tells them to "live their lives as best they could" in their companionship. Smith writes the words "Homo Sexual" in his appointment book. Earl Kofoed, who went to BYU from 1946 to 1948, similarly reports a "live and let live" attitude of leaders towards LGBTQ Mormons, and describes a thriving gay community at BYU. He states that there are no witch hunts, excommunications, or pressure to change one's sexual orientation at BYU like there would be in later decades.

== 1950s ==
- 1959 – BYU begins their on-campus electroshock and vomit aversion therapy program for males experiencing same-sex sexual attractions.

== 1960s ==
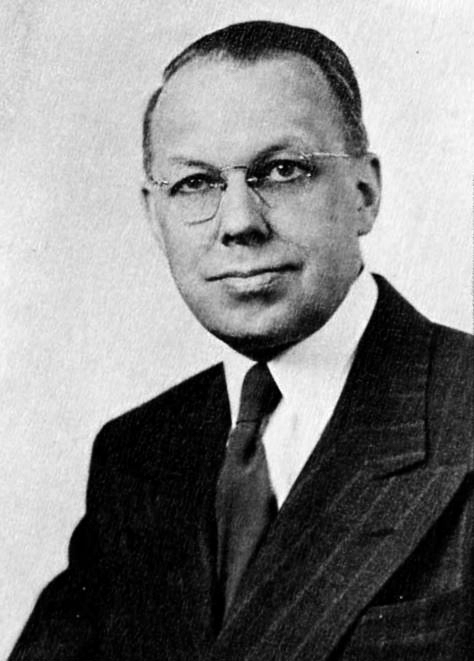
Under BYU president Ernest L. Wilkinson, any non-straight students are banned from attending the university.

- 1962 – The apostles Spencer W. Kimball and Mark E. Peterson tell BYU president Ernest L. Wilkinson that no student suspected of experiencing homosexual feelings should be allowed to attend BYU.
- 1962 – BYU president Ernest L. Wilkinson states in a speech to the student body that people with homosexual feelings will not be allowed to enroll or remain as students, since they contaminate the campus.
- 1963 – Elouise Bell begins teaching in the BYU English Department. Bell lived with and was in a long-term relationship with Provo High School teacher Margo E. LeVitre for many of her years at BYU, which she apparently kept secret from the university administration. In 2015, after her retirement, Bell married Nancy R Jefferis.
- 1964 – Apostle Kimball addresses seminary and institute faculty in a July 10 speech on BYU campus titled "A Counselling Problem in the Church", in which he calls homosexuality a "malady", "disease", and an "abominable and detestable crime against nature" that was "curable" by "self mastery." He cites one lay bishop (a businessman by trade) assigned by the church to administer a "program of rehabilitation" through which there had been "numerous cures." He says "the police, the courts, and the judges" have referred "many cases directly" to the church.
- 1965 – Kimball again addresses homosexuality in his January 5 BYU speech "Love vs. Lust." He calls it a "gross", "heinous", "obnoxious", "abominable" "vicious" sin. The text states that those with homosexual "desires and tendencies" could "correct" and "overcome" it "the same as if he had the urge toward petting or fornication or adultery", but that "the cure ... is like the cure for alcoholism, subject to continued vigilance." In the speech he states BYU "will never knowingly enroll ... nor tolerate ... anyone with these tendencies who fails to repent", and that it is a "damnable heresy" for a homosexual person to say "God made them that way." He also states that sometimes masturbation is an introduction to homosexuality.
- 1965 – Five suicides of gay male BYU students are reported in one year.
- 1967 – After a policy change allowing BYU bishops to share confidential information gained from the students during interviews with BYU administration took place, a dramatic rise in students suspected of homosexual activity is reported, totaling 72 recorded by BYU administration by the end of August 1968. Security files are kept by BYU on students suspected of being gay and students are encouraged to spy on other students.
- 1969 – BYU alumnus and Mormon painter Trevor Southey joins BYU's faculty teaching art until he is fired in 1979. He had attended the university as a student from 1965 to 1969, and divorced his wife and came out as gay in 1982. He died in 2015 at the age of 75.

== 1970s ==
- 1971 – Jim Dabakis enrolls at BYU after serving an LDS mission, but leaves and comes out at as gay at the age of 23. He was elected to the Utah State Senate in 2012.
- 1971 – Kenneth Mark Storer is a gay Mormon BYU graduate student. He would later become a pastor in the gay-friendly Metropolitan Community Church in Salt Lake, Boise, and Tacoma, and a leader in an AIDS-victim advocacy group in the 80s.
- 1973 – It is decided by the BYU Board of Trustees that the ban on people attracted to those of the same sex will be lifted, and they may enroll at BYU with local church leadership permission as long as they are not sexually expressing their attractions.
- 1973 – BYU psychology professor Allen Bergin publishes an article in the July New Era portraying some homosexuals as "psychologically disturbed persons" who are "compulsively driven to frequent and sometimes bizarre acts." He cites two clients with "compulsive or uncontrollable homosexuality" caused by intense fear of the opposite sex, a lack of social skills for male-female relationships, and seeking security exclusively from the same sex. Bergin discusses the behaviorist sexual orientation change efforts he used in an attempt to change their same-sex sexual behavior and attractions.

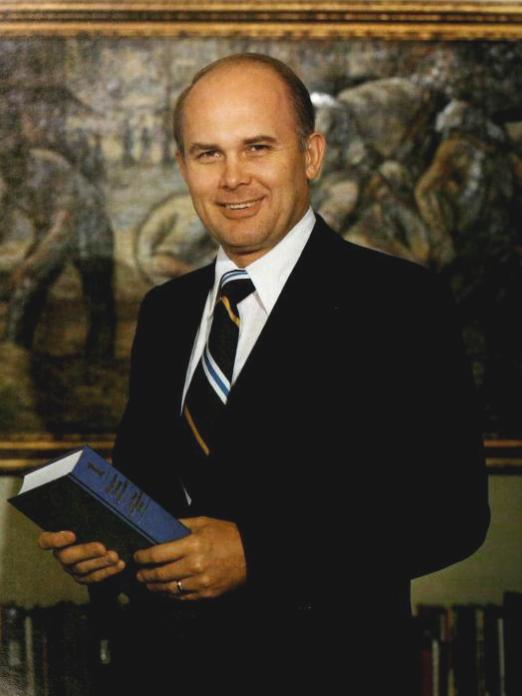
BYU president Oaks instituted a system of surveillance to identify and expel or attempt to "cure" homosexual students in the '70s.

- 1974 – BYU president Oaks delivers a speech on campus in which he speaks in favor of keeping criminal punishment for "deviate sexual behavior" such as private, consensual, same-sex sexual activity. The speech is later printed by the university's press.
- 1974 – Church president Kimball addresses the BYU student body, stating that sex reassignment surgeries are an appalling travesty.
- 1975 – As part of the ongoing BYU security homosexual entrapment campaigns, BYU security claims that an agency director for the US Department of Social Services man was caught soliciting sex by tapping his feet in a bathroom stall next to an undercover officer while visiting the campus, but the man denies the charges and calls the security sting harassment. BYU bans the man from campus after he refuses to meet with campus officials.
- 1976 – BYU begins a purge in January to expel homosexual students as part of president Oaks' widespread campaign to curtail the influence of homosexual people on campus. The purge includes interrogations of fine arts and drama students and surveillance of Salt Lake City gay bars by BYU security. These activities were reported in the Salt Lake Tribune and the gay newspaper Advocate.
- 1976 – BYU music professor Carlyle Marsden takes his own life two days after being outed by an arrest for alleged homosexual activity.
- 1976 – A 20-year study by a BYU Sociology professor is published showing that 10% of BYU men and 2% of BYU women indicated having had a "homosexual experience." In 1950, 1961, and 1972 Wilford E. Smith conducted a survey of thousands of Mormon students at several universities including many from the BYU sociology department as part of a larger survey. He found that "the response of Mormons [at BYU] did not differ significantly from the response of Mormons in state universities."
- 1977 – After hearing anti-gay rhetoric from BYU professor Reed Payne, BYU student Cloy Jenkins and gay BYU instructor Lee Williams produce the Payne Papers (later called Prologue) outlining information and experiences in defense of homosexual Mormons. It is later anonymously mailed to all high-ranking church leaders.
- 1977 Stephan Zakharias (formerly Stephen James Matthew Prince) and a group of other lesbian and gay Mormons and former-Mormons organize the first official LGBTQ Mormon group under the name Affirmation: Gay Mormons United on June 11 in Salt Lake City at the conference for the Salt Lake Coalition for Human Rights.

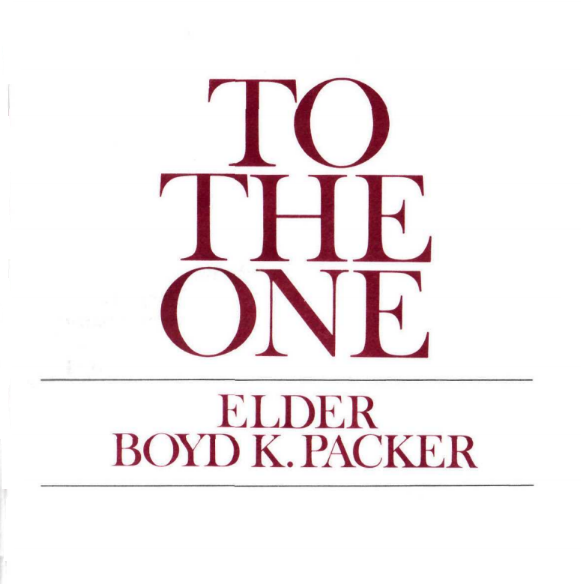
Pamphlet cover to a reprint of Packer's BYU speech on homosexuality.

- 1978 – The apostle Boyd K. Packer delivers a sermon at BYU on March 5 entitled "To the One", which went on to be published by the church as a pamphlet. Packer characterizes homosexual interaction as a perversion and presents the possibility that it had its roots in selfishness and could be cured with "unselfish thoughts, with unselfish acts." He states that the church had not previously talked more about homosexuality because "some matters are best handled very privately" and "we can very foolishly cause things we are trying to prevent by talking too much about them."
- 1978 – In November, BYU Security begins placing entrapment ads in a monthly Salt Lake City LGBTQ newspaper to ensnare BYU students. This results in the 1979 arrest of David Chipman, a former BYU student, who made a romantic advance after being taken on a drive by undercover BYU security agent David Neumann posing as a gay BYU student. Chipman's controversial conviction, due to the security officers making an arrest outside their jurisdiction for an entrapment case, goes to the Utah State Supreme Court.
- 1979 – Under the guidance of BYU president Dallin H. Oaks, BYU security begins campaigns to entrap any students participating in same-sex sexual behavior and expel them from the university.
- 1979 – BYU's newspaper publishes a series of articles in April quoting BYU and church leaders and gay students on homosexuality. The series includes comments by Maxine Murdock of the BYU Counseling Center and Ford McBride, a former psychology student who conducted BYU electroshock aversion experiments on fourteen gay BYU students. McBride and Murdock estimated that 4% of BYU students (or around 1,200 students) are homosexual. Additionally, commissioner of LDS Social Services Harold Brown states that homosexuality is not biological or inborn, and that church leaders just want to help them overcome their problem. Victor Brown Jr. compares it to an alcohol addiction that can be cured.

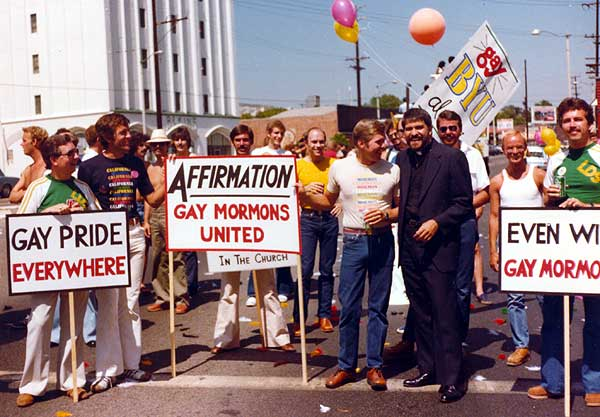
A BYU sign at the 1979 Los Angeles Pride parade.

- 1979 – A BYU alumni sign among others is held aloft by the Affirmation group at the Los Angeles Pride Parade in what is called the first out gay Mormon presence at a pride parade. One of the participants is interviewed on camera wearing a BYU jersey.

== 1980s ==
- 1982 – The Church-owned television station KBYU refuses to air the third segment of a documentary on homosexuality in Utah, partially because it contains interviews of anonymous gay BYU students. The producer, Kevin Mitchell, states their faces were not shown, as he believes they would be expelled from BYU if their identities were revealed.
- 1982 – In an address to BYU on August 28, then president of Ricks College Bruce C. Hafen counsels students to avoid homosexuality "at all costs, no matter what the circumstances." He further cites the 1973 removal of homosexuality as a mental disorder from the DSM as an example of something gone wrong "deep within our national soul."
- 1986 – BYU publishes a study by BYU professor and area Church Welfare Services director Victor Brown Jr. stating that people can eliminate homosexual feelings.
- 1986 – Church Seventy Theodore M. Burton implies a link between a "selfish indulgence" in pornography and homosexuality in his address to BYU on June 3.
- 1986 – An article is published referencing a gay BYU student who had been preparing for an opposite-sex temple marriage in the 80s under counsel from BYU professor and stake president Richard H. Cracroft. A few months into the marriage, the man shot himself, and Cracroft stated that "Admittedly, not many of us know how to counsel homosexuals."
- 1988 – BYU psychologist Allen E. Bergin is published in the October Ensign stating that homosexuality is "caused by some combination of biology and environment."
- 1988 – Gay BYU history professor and former BYU student D. Michael Quinn resigns under increasing pressure for publications on controversial aspects of Mormon history after working for the university since 1976. He came out as gay in 1996 when his book Same-Sex Dynamics Among Nineteenth-Century Americans: A Mormon Example was released.

== 1990s ==
- 1990s – Transgender woman Cammie Vanderveur, a BYU engineering student, wears a dress on campus only at night to avoid punishment.
- 1990 – The independent BYU newspaper Student Review begins publishing articles on the topic of homosexuality, dedicating an entire issue to the discussion, and frequently addressing the topic over the next four years.
- 1991 – An informal poll of students by an independent BYU newspaper finds that 5% of current students identify their sexual orientation as gay and 22% of all students know of a BYU student who is gay or lesbian.
- 1992 – The apostle Packer states in a BYU sermon that humans can degrade themselves below animals by pairing with people of the same-sex since animals don't mate with other animals of the same sex. However, same-sex pairing has been observed in more than 1,500 species, and is well-documented for 500 of them.
- 1994 – Then-apostle James E. Faust gives a November speech on campus in which he states that homosexuality is not biological or inborn and that same-sex marriage will unravel families, the fabric of human society.
- 1994 – BYU publishes an anthropology masters thesis titled Cross-Cultural Categories of Female Homosexuality.
- mid-1990s – BYU's on-campus electroshock aversion therapy program, which had begun in 1959, ends over three decades later.
- 1996 – BYU Spanish professor Thomas Matthews is reported to a top LDS authority in July for stating that he is gay in private conversations. He states that BYU did not like that he was out of the closet despite being celibate and keeping BYU codes of conduct, and eventually leaves the university. BYU president Lee states that it was "simply not comfortable for the university" for him to continue teaching there.
- 1996 – A campus group for gay students and allies, "Open Forum", is founded, and with faculty advisor Paul Thomas, they seek but are denied official club status from BYU administrators.
- 1997 – A poll of over 400 BYU students finds that 42% of students believe that even if a same-sex attracted person keeps the honor code, they should not be allowed to attend BYU and nearly 80% say they would not live with a roommate attracted to people of the same sex. However, the poll's stated 5 percent margin of error was criticized as being too low an estimate because of the cluster sampling in classes.
- 1997 – The university newspaper publishes an article featuring several openly gay students. A lesbian student came out to her roommates, and one moved out because of it. A housing manager said that some students panic when they find out their roommate is attracted to some people of the same sex, and he advised them to go to the Honor Code Office. The Honor Code Office director Rush Sumpter stated that BYU forbids actions of verifiable, overt displays of gay affection, but does not punish attractions. One student stated she tried to pray her feelings away, and another said her parents sent her to BYU in an attempt to straighten out her homosexual feelings.
- 1998 – Out gay student Sam Clayton graduates from BYU after activism in helping organize the LGBTQ student group "Open Forum" and conducting sociological surveys on LGBTQ topics at BYU. He reports threats of expulsion from BYU administrators.

== 2000s ==
- 2000 – BYU's newspaper publishes an article in which some students questioned BYU's official neutrality on same-sex marriage initiatives in California.
- 2000 – On February 25, Stuart Matis, a former BYU student and an active gay Mormon, dies by suicide on the steps of a California church stake center building. Four days before his death, he wrote a letter that was published in the BYU newspaper pleading for the acceptance of homosexual individuals in response to a letter published by BYU five days before which compared homosexuality to pedophilia, bestiality and Satanism. Just before his death, he wrote a note stating, "God never intended me to be straight. Hopefully, my death might be a catalyst for some good."
- 2000 – BYU psychology professor Richard Williams presents a criticism of same-sex parenting at BYU's 2000 World Family Policy Forum.
- 2001 – At BYU's Family Under Fire Conference, LDS Family Services director Jerry Harris gives some "steps to recovery" from homosexuality.
- 2003 – After facing criticism from several organizations, KBYU and BYU-TV cancel the planned broadcast of LDS therapist Jeff Robinson's presentation "Homosexuality: What Works and What Doesn't Work" given at BYU's 2002 Families Under Fire conference. The talk characterized homosexuality as a serious addiction that could be cured with enough motivation, and stated that gay men can develop a sexual attraction to women if they walk away from, rather than focusing on or fighting, the dragon of their gayness.
- 2003 – Former BYU student Clay Essig reports writing a note while at the brink of suicide after years of trying to change his attractions through therapy originally prescribed to him by his BYU bishop.
- 2003 – For his senior project, a BYU student creates a documentary called Troy Through a Window about his gay brother and how his Mormon family dealt with his coming out.
- 2003 – LDS Family Services counselor Jerry Harris presents at BYU's Families Under Fire conference on helping people overcome their homosexuality.
- 2004 – In March, BYU molecular biology professor William Bradshaw receives media attention for presenting evidence for biological underpinnings to human homosexuality.
- 2005 – The Foundation for Attraction Research (FAR) is founded and run mostly by BYU professors, including BYU psychology professor Dean Byrd and BYU social work professor Shirley Cox, with a board of directors also consisting of BYU English professor Doris Dant, BYU law professor William Duncan, BYU religion professor John Livingstone, and retired BYU psychology professor Gawain Wells. In 2009, the organization published Understanding Same-Sex Attraction which advocated therapy to change sexual attractions. In 2012, FAR co-hosted the Reconciling Faith and Feelings conference with the Association of Mormon Counselors and Psychotherapists (AMCAP).
- 2005 – At BYU's Families Under Fire Conference, social work professor Shirley Cox presents on homosexuality, stating that homosexual attractions can be diminished and that the treatment of unwanted same-sex attraction has a history of being successful.
- 2006 – Soulforce's Equality Ride makes a stop at the BYU campus in April, protesting BYU's policies towards LGBTQ students. 5 riders are arrested on the 10th for giving speeches on campus, while other riders are allowed to remain answering student questions as long as they do not make a demonstration. The next day, 5 current and 4 former BYU students, as well 15 riders, are arrested for involvement in a procession of about 30 individuals bringing lilies onto campus and lying down in a 'die-in' in remembrance of LGBTQ Mormon suicide victims. Those arrested later receive a $200 fine.
- 2006 – In June, BYU fires adjunct professor Jeffrey Nielsen for writing an opinion piece in support of same-sex marriage.
- 2007 – Soulforce's Equality Ride makes a second stop at BYU's campus on March 22. The demonstration results in two arrests when a mother and her transgender son walk onto campus to present administrators with a collection of concerns from former and current BYU LGBTQ students.
- 2007 – BYU Law professor Lynn Wardle addresses the 4th World Congress of Families in Poland on same-sex marriage and publishes his speech in a law journal. He compares his warnings "tragic consequences" and "dangers of legalizing same-sex marriage" as the warnings of a Hungarian man warning Elie Wiesel's town about the dangers the incoming Nazis posed to the Jewish population there. He also states that if same-sex marriages were legalized, there would be no basis to deny polygamous or incestuous marriages, and a decreased ability to "protect their children from exposure to gay propaganda."
- 2007 – Shortly after the Soul Force demonstration, the BYU Board of Trustees, under the direction of First Presidency member Thomas S. Monson, revises the BYU Honor Code in April to clarify that "one's stated same-gender attraction is not an Honor Code issue" while continuing to ban "all forms of physical intimacy that give expression to homosexual feelings."
- 2007 – Actor Taylor Frey states that he had experienced what he called a "witch hunt", in which he was falsely reported to the Honor Code Office by another student for same-sex romantic behavior with what was a platonic friend.
- 2009 – The first explicit mention of homosexuality in the language of the school's code of conduct available to students is published in the Fall.
- 2009 – The lesbian-themed play Little Happy Secrets premiered. Written by BYU graduate Melissa Leilani Larson, it centered on an LDS BYU student who falls in love with her roommate.

== 2010s ==
=== 2010 ===
- 2010 – Shortly after a policy change removing the ban on LGBTQ BYU students gathering together in a group, LGBTQ and straight students begin weekly meetings on BYU campus as USGA to discuss issues relating to homosexuality and the LDS Church.

=== 2011 ===
- January – A BYU law student states that he was threatened with expulsion for publishing the book Homosexuality: A Straight BYU Student's Perspective which contained arguments in favor of same-sex marriage.
- February – BYU's Honor Code is updated to remove the ban on any "advocacy of homosexual behavior" defined as "promoting homosexual relations as being morally acceptable."
- November – BYU fires a gay broadcasting department faculty member. The employee states that BYU had become an increasingly hostile work environment and that being gay played into his being fired.

=== 2012 ===
- March – LGBTQ BYU students receive national attention for their "It Gets Better" video.
- April – A Sociology Department panel of LGBTQ BYU students receive press coverage as well as complaints to the university from a conservative political group.
- December – By the end of the year, USGA is banned from meeting on campus and continues to be banned as of 2018. USGA moves its meetings to the Provo City Library.

=== 2013 ===
- February – Gay BYU student Jimmy Hales gains media attention with a comedic video of coming out live to family and friends.
- May – Ty Mansfield, a sexual minority Latter-day Saint who has been open about his sexuality, starts teaching as an adjunct instructor in Religious Education at BYU, where he has continued to teach since.

=== 2014 ===
- January – In a BYU devotional, BYU professor Jonathan Sandberg mentions the church's website mormonsandgays.org and encourages people who are experiencing challenges like the "struggle" of "same-gender attraction" to keep faith and trust God.
- April – A BYU survey of students gains media attention for only giving the option of "heterosexual but struggles with same-sex attraction" or "heterosexual and does not struggle with same-sex attraction" for identifying one's sexual orientation.
- August – The BYU Bookstore briefly sells greeting cards for congratulating recently married same-sex couples. The cards are quickly pulled, making international news.
- October – BYU student Curtis Penfold leaves the church because he disagrees with its teachings on LGBTQ rights, and is evicted from his apartment, fired from his job, and expelled from BYU. He states that he, "felt so hated by this community I used to love."
- October – Film student Scott Raia's documentary about queer BYU students Bridey Jensen and Samy Galvez is shown on campus.

=== 2015 ===
- January – A gay BYU student and Church Missionary Training Center employee is physically assaulted by his roommates after he tells one of them that he was gay. The man experiences bruised ribs after allegedly being dragged from his room amid gay slurs. The situation results in a lawsuit.
- September – In a BYU Devotional address, Ronald A. Rasband, then in the Presidency of the Seventy, addresses concerns about the church's involvement in politics. He shares hypothetical stories of a man fired for being gay and a woman marginalized at work for being Mormon and bemoaned that it is less politically correct to empathize with the religious woman. He invited students to discuss LGBTQ rights and religious freedom and to write comments on his Facebook post. The address is later reprinted in a church magazine.
- 2015 – In a survey of 92 LGBTQ BYU students by USGA, 52% have at some point considered self-harm.

=== 2016 ===
- January – The advocacy organization FreeBYU files an accreditation complaint to the American Bar Association against the BYU law school. The complaint argues that the honor code's prohibition of dating, romantic expression, and marriage between same-sex partners, but not their heterosexual counterparts, violates the accrediting body's anti-discrimination policies. The American Bar Association acknowledges the complaint and forwards it to committee for consideration, but then rejects the complaint after BYU makes changes to its Honor Code.
- February – BYU student Harry Fisher comes out on Facebook in 2015. Around two months later, after hearing anti-gay rhetoric from individuals around him, and after instances of having to leave his BYU singles ward meeting to cry in his car, he dies by suicide on February 12, 2016.
- August – BYU and Church policies on LGBTQ persons get the spotlight, as these served as a deterrent in their football team being considered as a Fall addition to the Big 12 Conference.

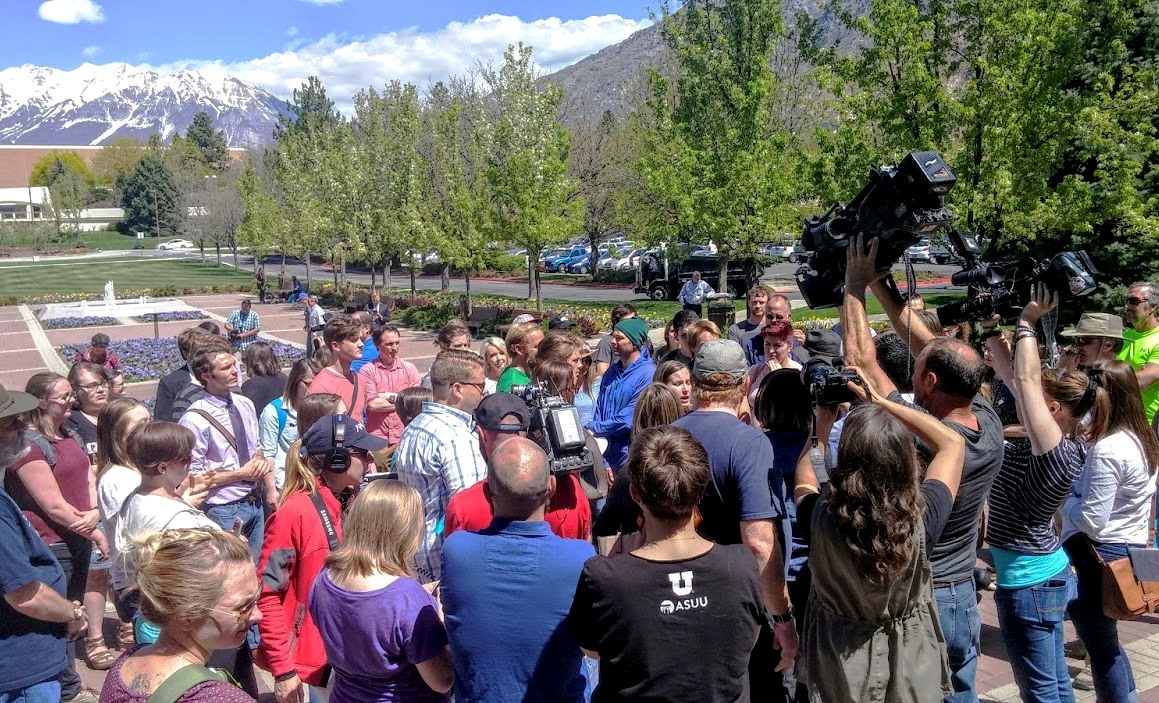
Protesters deliver 60,000 petition signatures to BYU's administration in response to reports of administrators mistreating rape and assault survivors, including LGBTQ students.

- August – During the BYU Title IX controversy around the university's policies and treatment of student survivors of sexual assault, the Salt Lake Tribune publishes an article containing firsthand accounts of several current and former LGBTQ BYU students who were sexually assaulted or raped as students and their subsequent experiences with administrators.
- October – BYU student Jessyca Fulmer is featured on the LDS church's website Mormon and Gay.
- November – The Provo newspaper Daily Herald publishes six in-depth articles on the experiences of BYU LGBTQ students, centered around the topics of why they attend, USGA, mental health, the Honor Code, and why some leave. The articles are written over the space of two months, with an editorial conclusion at the end of the series asking administrators to listen to LGBTQ BYU students.

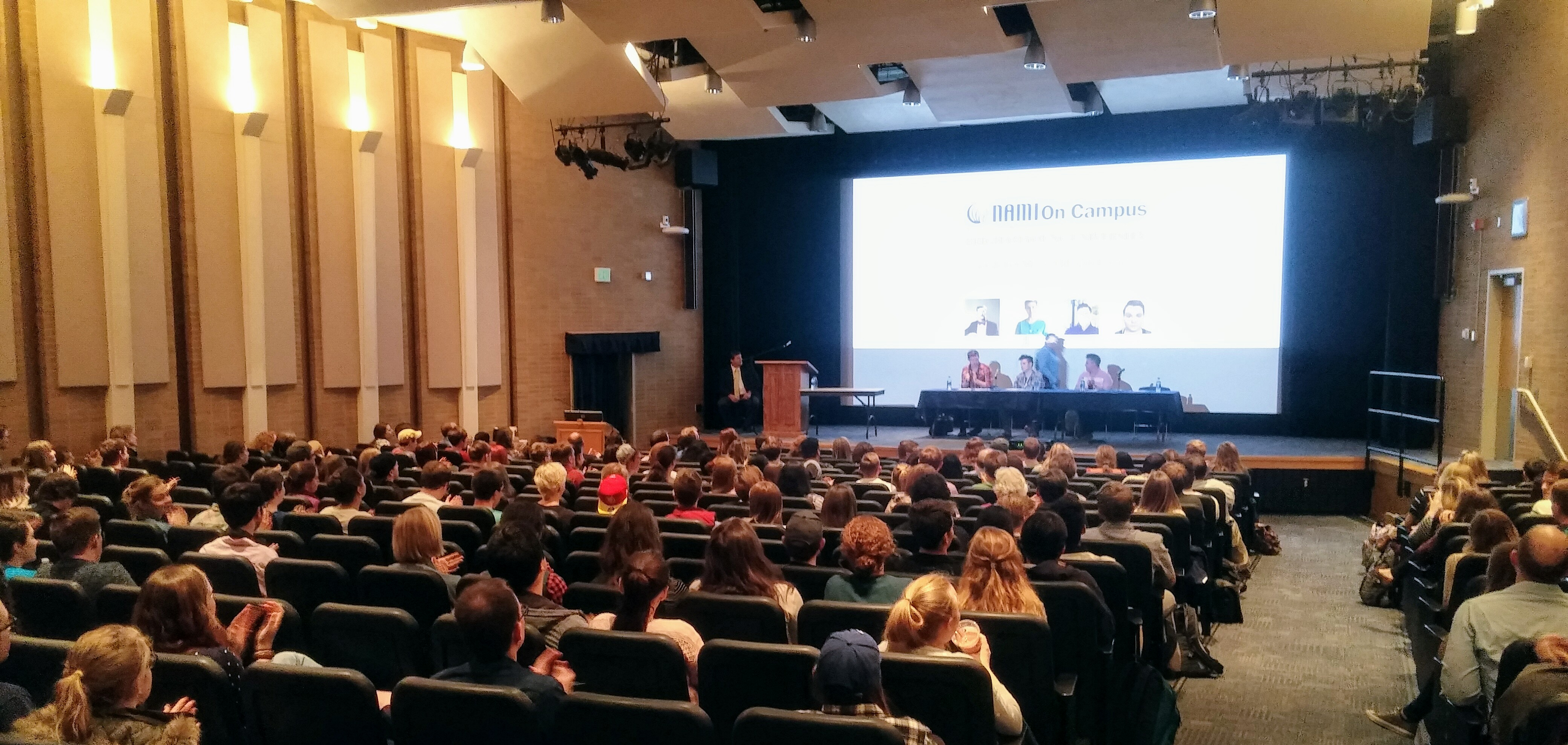
BYU's first official campus LGBTQ-specific event in April 2017.

=== 2017 ===
- April – The first LGBT-specific campus-wide event is held on the 7th by the BYU NAMI club. Some LGBTQ BYU students discuss some of their experiences and difficulties posed by being a sexual or gender minority at BYU. A similar-sized university nearby held its first official LGBTQ campus event and student group over 45 years before in 1971.
- September – BYU students and a professor are featured prominently in an article on the Provo LGBTQ Pride Festival.
- September – The unofficial BYU group "Rise and Shout" holds the university's first LGBTQ alumni gathering.
- October – A lesbian BYU student gains media attention for her coming out images and quotes on Faces of USGA.
- October – A Provo newspaper publishes an article on current and former transgender BYU students.
- November – In response to a question about LGBTQ young single adults in the church, the apostle M. Russell Ballard tells BYU students in a campus-wide event that "I believe you have a place in the kingdom and recognize that sometimes it may be difficult for you to see where you fit in the Lord's Church, but you do." He also told cisgender, heterosexual members, "We need to listen to and understand what our LGBT brothers and sisters are feeling and experiencing. Certainly, we must do better than we have done in the past so that all members feel they have a spiritual home." He further explains that church leaders believe "core rights of citizenship should be protected for all people — for LGBT people, for people of all faiths", and that "reasonable compromises" should be found "in other areas when rights conflict." He states that church leaders supported the recent LoveLoud Festival to send a message that "LGBT youth or anyone else should never be mistreated."
- November – A BYU survey is released, having been completed by 43% of students, in which .2% of the 12,602 who completed the survey (or 25 responders) reported that their gender identity was transgender or something other than cisgender male or female.

=== 2018 ===
- March – BYU Student Life hosts the first university-hosted LGBTQ campus event. It featured a panel of four students answering student-submitted questions.
- April – After a controversy over BYU's policies around LGBTQ people, a conference for the US Society for Political Methodology is moved off of campus citing "long-strained relations between the LGBTQ community and BYU" and concerns over the university's ban on homosexual behavior which the Society repudiates along with "the intolerance it represents."
- July – Church leaders' continued denial of BYU LGBTQ students' years of requests to form an LGBTQ club on campus receives national coverage.
- November – The NCAA Common Ground IV forum is hosted at BYU. The goal of this forum is to "establish inclusive and respectful athletics environments for participants of all sexual orientations, gender identities and religious beliefs. Notable attendees are the president of BYU, Kevin J Worthen, and NCAA Vice president of Inclusion and Human Resources Katrice Albert.
- November – BYU's Instagram is hosted by an out gay student for a day. He answers questions about being a gay BYU student.

=== 2019 ===
- April – At a graduation ceremony speech, the Political Science Department's valedictorian comes out as gay publicly for the first time, an event which receives national media attention.
- July – Emma Gee becomes the first Division I athlete in BYU's 143-year history to be publicly out after coming out as bisexual. She reports having what she called a traumatizing and homophobic required meeting with her bishop in which her sexual orientation was discussed.
- August – KUER's Lee Hale talks to former BYU faculty member Kerry Spencer about the "Growing Queer Community" at BYU.
- September – The American Geophysical Union in Washington, D.C., and the Geological Society of America in Colorado pull BYU professor job ads from their websites after complaints from constituents that BYU's honor code discriminates against anyone in a same-sex marriage or relationship from applying in violation of both organizations' ethical standards.
- November – In the BYU Political Review, a magazine published by students, an article was included titled "Is the LGBT+ Moment Over?" The article discusses how more needs to be done nationally and internationally before LGBTQ people have equal rights. It also discusses LGBTQ suicide rates. After copies of the edition were distributed on campus, a group of anonymous students stapled copies of the Family Proclamation inside the magazines that said "BYU Political Review regularly publishes messages contrary to church doctrine."
- November – BYU's first LGBTQ-specific on-campus center, the BYU Office of Student Success and Inclusion, is formed.

== 2020s ==
=== 2020 ===
- January – The BYU Office of Student Success and Inclusion hosts a panel focused on LGBTQ+ topics at BYU.
- January – BYU started allowing same-sex couples to dance in their annually hosted U.S. National Amateur Dancesport Championships, a competition sanctioned by the National Dance Council of America. The year before during a lawsuit, the NDCA changed its policy to allow same-sex couples to dance in all the same genres, competitions, and events as opposite-sex couples. BYU initially decided to forego the NDCA’s sanction of the event and host it anyways. But after protests by some dancers involved, BYU chose to start allowing same-sex couples to compete.
- February – BYU removes the ban on "homosexual behavior" from its Honor Code, which many initially think finally allowed LGBTQ students to perform ordinary public displays of romantic affection, although, like straight students, they still must abstain from sexual relationships outside of marriage. However, BYU's leadership later clarifies removing "homosexual behavior" from its Honor Code still did not permit any public displays of romantic affection towards a same-sex partner or same-sex dating, which sparks more outrage and protests from the LGBTQ community and allies. Jim Brau, a professor in BYU's finance program, is targeted online with death threats from the alt-right LDS group DezNat after calling the changes to the Honor Code a "blessing".
- March – A poll of 7,625 BYU students finds that over 13% (996) of those surveyed indicated that their sexual orientation is something other than "strictly heterosexual."
- July – Same-Sex Attracted, a documentary by queer BYU students about queer BYU students, debuts at the Salt Lake City LGBTQ film festival.
- October – Provo's Prodigal Press, a student-published media outlet, published an article on the experience of gender non-conforming students in BYU bathrooms. The Prodigal Press has since published other LGBTQ-related articles including on LGBTQ suicidality at BYU, how to go about queer dating, and the woundedness of many LGBTQ students.
- November – Flourish Point was founded in Rexburg, Idaho as a mental health and community resource center for LGBTQ people. They’ve provided services and resources to many LGBTQ students at BYU-Idaho.

=== 2021 ===
- March – Color the Campus, an LGBTQ awareness group at BYU, holds a Rainbow Day on March 4 to commemorate one year since the same-sex dating policy clarification. Rainbow Day is held about once per semester to "[show love] and support for LGBTQ+ students and faculty at all CES schools", as stated on the group's Instagram page. As part of the March 4 Rainbow Day, students light the Y in rainbow colors for about an hour. About 20 minutes after the lighting began, BYU tweeted that it had not authorized the lighting of the Y that evening.
- April – BYUtv told Toronto's NOW Magazine that it will start having more openly LGBTQ people in their shows. This came in response to Canadian writers and producers expressing concerns over BYUtv's unwritten exclusion of LGBTQ people.
- April – Austin Haymore, a gay BYU student, was retroactively suspended hours after his graduation. Haymore claimed to have met a man years before who stalked him and reported him to the Honor Code Office for being on a gay dating app.
- April – Jessica Livier Haynes, a queer Latter-day Saint, spoke at BYU Women's Conference. She talked about creating safe, inclusive spaces in the church.
- May - A BYU religion professor with a large social media following publicly calls a gay BYU student a Book of Mormon term for an anti-Christ, drawing media criticism. The gay student also receives death threats from others, but there is no public action against the professor by BYU.
- May – The first devotional about the LGBTQ experience on the BYU–Hawaii campus was held, with the Mackintosh family and Iese Wilson as speakers.
- June – The BYU RaYnbow Collective was founded by students as a nonprofit to provide community and resources for LGBTQ students.
- June – Kevin Beijerling, an international LGBTQ student from New Zealand, left BYU to avoid expulsion and the subsequent threat of deportation. Beijerling stated that a group of DezNat-affiliated people online found intimate photos of him and reported him to the BYU Honor Code Office.
- June – The first Rexburg Pride celebration was held by Flourish Point. Many BYU-Idaho students have attended the yearly event.
- June - BYU Pride, a student-run LGBTQ resource center, organizes the first pride march at BYU. More than 1,000 people march from Joaquin Park to Kiwanis Park in support of queer BYU students. BYU Pride releases a statement of purpose of the march calling for the university to publicly express love for the LGBTQ community at BYU and make specified changes to "alleviate hardships and improve the well-being of many BYU students"
- August - BYU announces the opening of the Office of Belonging with BYU president Kevin Worthen, stating that the office will help combat "prejudice of any kind, including that based on ... sexual orientation."
- August - Church apostle Jeffrey Holland makes a speech at BYU discussing LGBTQ people, in which he calls for more "musket fire" from BYU faculty in opposition to same-sex marriage, drawing criticism. In 2024, portions of this speech were added to required reading as part of a new course for all incoming students.
- August - Days after Holland's speech on LGBTQ people, BYU students draw pro-LGBTQ chalk art on the corner of campus, but a BYU student vandalizes the art on camera, stating that "faggots go to hell". He is later either expelled or drops out of the university.
- September - Students again light the Y in anticipation of Rainbow Day and LGBTQ history month. Sources claim that BYU administration is informally supportive of the demonstration and puts BYU police on notice to protect students from counter protestors.
- October – The U.S. Department of Education begins a civil rights investigation of BYU to determine if the university's discipline of LGBTQ students violates the scope of the university's Title IX exemptions.
- October – An article, written by Walter Schumm, was published in the Deseret News. The article, titled "Opinion: Latter-day Saint LGBTQ youths may have lower suicide risk, two new studies suggest" discusses how two recent studies (one by BYU and one by Bowling Green State University) suggest a negative correlation between being a Latter-Day Saint and teen LGBTQ suicide.
- November – In a live Q&A at the University of Virginia, apostle Dallin H. Oaks denied that electroshock conversion therapy happened at BYU while he was president of the university (1971–1980). Several days later, the Salt Lake Tribune published an article citing records that call this statement by Oaks into question.
- November – A staged reading was performed for a musical titled The Rainbow Academy, the Commercial Music capstone project of BYU student Peter Morgan. The musical tells a story about sexual assault in the gay community of a fictional Christian college. After Morgan received his diploma, he offered insight into how BYU administrators tried to censor the performance by moving it off campus and suggesting cuts.
- December – Sue Bergin was terminated from her position as a writing professor at BYU. While Bergin was never given a specific reason for her termination other than the end of her contract, it was widely believed that this happened due to her vocal advocacy of LGBTQ people in the church. Bergin was a co-writer of The Mama Dragon Monologues play in 2019.

=== 2022 ===
- January - BYU releases a new demonstration policy, which includes a ban on all demonstrations on Y mountain, ostensibly in response to the rainbow Y lightings in March and October 2021.
- January - The Salt Lake Tribune reports a non-binary BYU graduate did not report being sexually assaulted as a student by their BYU teaching assistant in part because of fear of how the Honor Code office may surveil and distrust non-cisgender students, as well as assault victims.
- February - The U.S. Department of Education dismisses the civil rights investigation of BYU regarding the university's discipline of LGBTQ students, determining that the university is acting within its rights under its approved Title IX exemptions and that the Department of Education's Office of Civil Rights lacks jurisdiction to investigate further.
- February - BYU cancels care for transgender clients receiving voice therapy at its speech clinic. The American Speech–Language–Hearing Association later issues a statement saying "BYU's decision was in direct opposition to practice expected"
- March - In anticipation of students lighting the Y in rainbow colors for rainbow day, BYU fences it off with orange mesh fencing and signs saying, "demonstrations are prohibited on the Y and university-owned portions of Y mountain. Violators are subject to criminal citations for trespassing." A few days later, students celebrating Rainbow Day are asked to leave campus for violating the new demonstration policy.
- March - The LDS Church announces new questions that the Church Educational System will ask ecclesiastical leaders of potential new hires. One question that garnered public interest is: "Does this member have a testimony of The Church of Jesus Christ of Latter-day Saints and of its doctrine, including its teachings on marriage, family, and gender?"
- April - A BYU student on stage at the graduation ceremony showing the rainbow colors inside her graduation gown as a form of protest gains national media attention.
- June – The first official BYU-approved LGBTQ demonstration was held on campus. Organized by the Cougar Pride Center, the demonstration included speeches from students and faculty.
- August - At the last minute, BYU leaders have pamphlets about local LGBTQ events and off-campus resources removed from packets that are to be given to all incoming students.
- September – The BYU RaYnbow Collective held a back to school pride night at a park near the campus, which included a drag show. During the event, volunteers dressed as angels stood between event attendees and a group of protestors.
- October - As part of the nationwide "Strike Out Queerphobia" protest, over 100 students block off 800 N in protest of anti-LGBTQ+ policies.
- November - The Stanford University marching band performed a skit during a football game between Stanford and BYU in which they satirized BYU's anti-LGBTQ policies with a mock Mormon wedding between two women.

=== 2023 ===
- 2023 – The BYU Women's Services and Resources center began hosting recurring "Better Together" socials for LGBTQ students.
- 2023 – A recurring Come, Follow Me study group for LGBTQ students started being held at the Office of Belonging.
- January – Brandon Sanderson, a Latter-Day Saint and prominent fantasy writer, expressed support for LGBTQ people on a blog post, including full support for gay marriage and transgender rights. Since his statements of support for the LGBTQ community, Sanderson has continued to teach a creative writing class at BYU.
- March – BYU holds PEN talks, where LGBTQ+ students share their experiences.
- April – LDS pianist David Glen Hatch spoke at a BYU-Hawaii devotional. He talked about Satan being “progressive” and deceiving people with a “socially relevant, liberal Jesus who somehow cares more about your truth than the truth He came to personify, proclaim, and die for.” He also said that “[Satan] won’t tell you to give up your faith in Jesus, but that obviously some of His outdated theology needs revamping because it no longer works today. A good chunk of it is offensive enough to be considered a hate crime, especially that bit about marriage and sexuality.”
- April – The Cougar Chronicle, a conservative campus news outlet at BYU, wrote a critical article of professor Sarah Coyne, who talked about her 8 year-old child with gender dysphoria in a religion class. Utah Senator Mike Lee later retweeted the article, saying "Commonplace at most universities, but BYU?" This led to online harassment and threats sent to Coyne. The Salt Lake Tribune later wrote about the article and subsequent harassment that came from it. The Cougar Chronicle later wrote a response to the Tribune article, condemning Coyne's harassment while also claiming that the Tribune never reached out to them for comment.
- May – 3 separate articles were written by BYU religion professors in the Religious Educator about the Family Proclamation. They discuss how the document was written, as well as other events and trends that prompted its creation.
- May – Allison Dayton, founder of Lift + Love, spoke at the BYU Women's Conference. The Cougar Chronicle, a student-owned news outlet at BYU, later expressed concern over Dayton's speaking at the conference due to her pro-transgender views.
- June – The Cougar Chronicle published an article titled "Pornography and Transgenderism". The article discusses rising cases in "Rapid Onset Gender Dysphoria". It claims that gender dysphoria is partially caused by consumption of "sissy porn" and other sexual content that encourages "autogynephilia".
- August – Active Latter-day Saints Charlie Bird and Ryan Clifford married in a same-sex ceremony at the Utah state capitol. Their marriage celebration included the appearance of BYU's mascot Cosmo the Cougar. The Cougar Chronicle later published an article calling into question the appearance of the mascot, writing "The invocation of school symbolism and even religious symbolism and language can be problematic for those attempting to understand the true value system of the institution. If Cosmo appears at an event, is it an endorsement of the event? … So we ask the reader, should Cosmo have attended Charlie's wedding?"
- August – BYU leadership reinstates the explicit ban on "same sex romantic behavior" in the institutions Honor Code.
- August – Cougar Pride Center starts a queer-inclusive choir called the "Rainbow Chorus"
- October – The BYU Political Review began publishing a series of articles on transgender topics. Topics covered included mental health and suicide rates among transgender people, the place of transgender people in larger political and cultural discourse, anti-transgender legislation in Utah, and the general experience of LGBTQ people.

=== 2024 ===
- March – The documentary A Long Way from Heaven, produced by LGBTQ students at BYU, premiered, chronicling LGBTQ experiences at the university and the lighting of Y Mountain.

=== 2025 ===
- January – The Salt Lake Tribune reported on alleged hiring practices at BYU under Church Educational System commissioner Clark G. Gilbert, which some claimed targeted LGBTQ-supportive faculty. All sources employed by BYU remained anonymous.
- January – Ben Schilaty published an article on his blog titled "I Worked at BYU as an Openly Gay Administrator." In the article, he illustrates the struggles of being openly gay at BYU, letters and phone calls from church members expressing concern over him working there, and his decision to leave BYU in 2023 and work at Utah Valley University. He also recounted a conversation with a top campus administrator where he stated "The Church does excommunicate some people in same-sex marriages", to which the administrator advised him against saying that publicly by stating "It might be true, but it's not helpful."
- February – The first campus-wide LGBTQ event sponsored by BYU was held.
- February – In a video published by Cwic Media, Greg Matsen interviewed Jacob Christensen, editor of The Cougar Chronicle, a conservative news outlet at BYU. In the interview, they discuss how BYU students and administrators are working to remove DEI and pro-LGBTQ ideology from the university. A follow-up video on the same topic was uploaded several months later where Matsen interviewed Cade Alvey, a BYU student and co-host of the All Those in Favor channel.
- April – The Un Lugar Más En La Mesa podcast was launched by BYU students André Pérez and Javier Aguilar. Hosted in Spanish, the podcast answers questions commonly asked by LGBTQ Latter-Day Saints.
- September – A 2-day conference at BYU was held to commemorate the 30th anniversary of the Family Proclamation being released. Speakers included professors such as North Star co-founder Ty Mansfield, who gave presentations titled “Feeling Joy in Christ Through the Proclamation When We Don't Fit the Mold” and “By Divine Design: The Stewardship of Gender and Sexuality”.

== See also ==
- Homosexuality and The Church of Jesus Christ of Latter-day Saints
- Gender minorities and the Church of Jesus Christ of Latter-day Saints
- LGBTQ rights in Utah
- LGBTQ Mormon suicides
- Sexuality and Mormonism
