= Brigham Young University LGBTQ history =

Overview of BYU and LGBTQ people

LGBTQ (Note: LGBTQ is an initialism for lesbian, gay, bisexual, transgender and queer or questioning which functions as an umbrella term broadly referring to all sexualities, romantic orientations, sex characteristics, and gender identities that are not heterosexual, heteroromantic, cisgender, or endosex.) students and staff have a long, documented history at Brigham Young University (BYU), and have experienced a range of treatment by students and school administrators since its founding in 1875. Large surveys of over 7,000 BYU students in 2020 and 2017 found that over 13% had marked their sexual orientation as something other than "strictly heterosexual", and another that 0.2% had reported their gender identity as "transgender or other". BYU is the largest religious university in North America and is the flagship institution of the educational system of the Church of Jesus Christ of Latter-day Saints (LDS Church)—Mormonism's largest denomination.

Historically, experiences for BYU students identifying as LGBTQ have included being banned from enrolling due to their romantic attractions in the 60s; being required by school administration to undergo therapy in the 1970s, including electroshock and vomit aversion therapies in "special cases"; having nearly 80% of BYU students refusing to live with an openly homosexual person in a poll in the 1990s; and a ban on coming out until 2007. Until 2021 there were not any LGBTQ-specific resources on campus, though there is now the Office of Student Success and Inclusion. BYU students are at risk of discipline and expulsion by the Honor Code Office for many expressions of same-sex romantic feelings like same-sex dating, hugging, and kissing, for gender non-conforming dress, and students and faculty are still banned from meeting together in a queer-straight alliance group on campus.

Several LGBTQ rights organizations have criticized BYU's policies around queer students and The Princeton Review has regularly ranked BYU as one of the most LGBTQ-unfriendly schools in the United States. Although BYU policies specific to same-sex romantic expressions have existed since the 50s, these were only available to administrators, and the first publicly available explicit mention of homosexuality in the language of the school's code of conduct was not publicly published until the fall of 2009. The first LGBTQ-specific campus-wide event was held in April 2017. Though faced with this historical and current environment, LGBTQ individuals have continued to enroll in and attend BYU with many participating in unofficial LGBTQ BYU communities.

== Ban on gay students ==
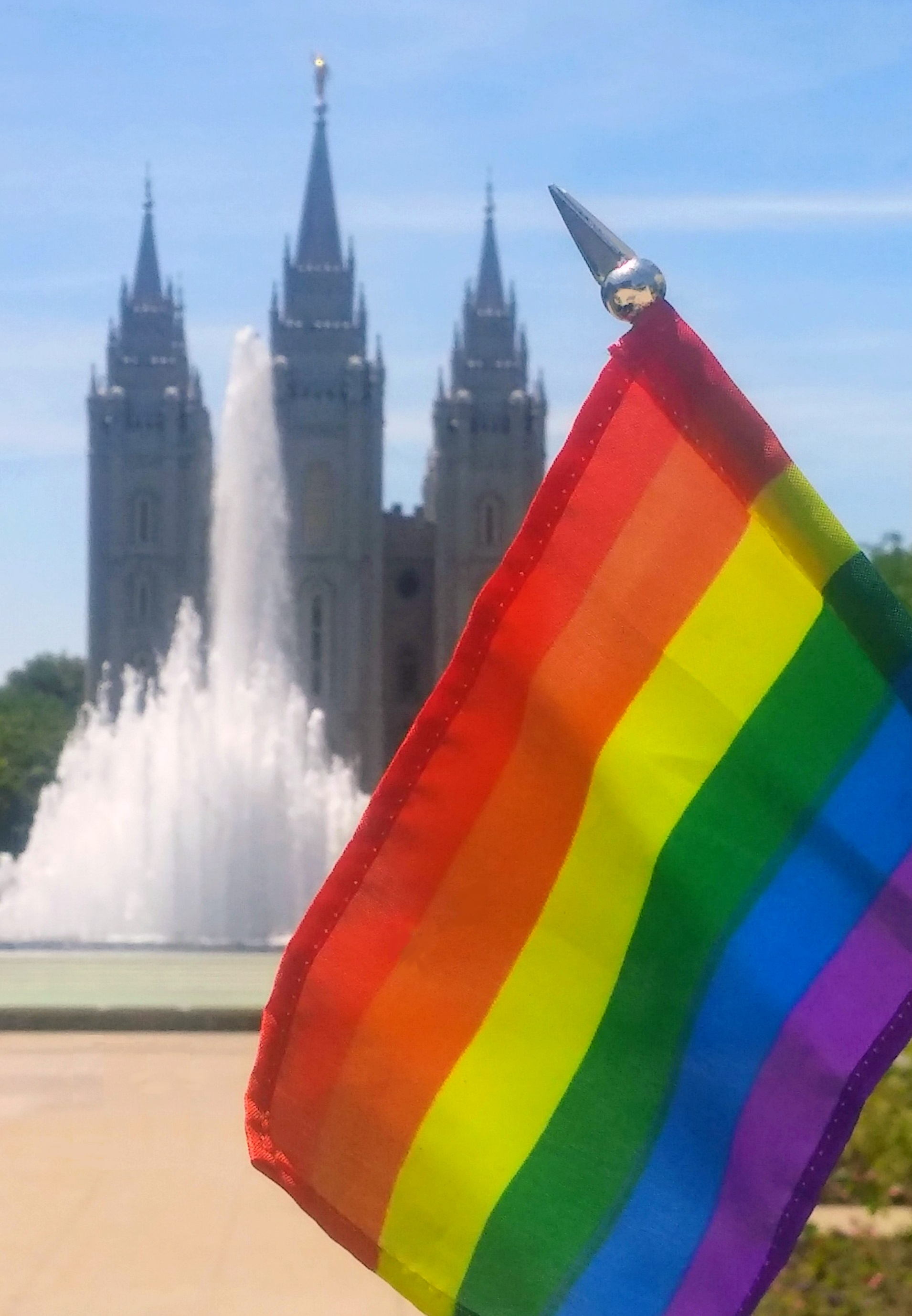
BYU policies, including the complete ban on students attracted to the same sex in the 60s, are decided by the Board of Trustees, composed of general authorities.

Before 1959 there was little explicit mention of homosexuality by BYU administration, but by 1962 a ban on homosexual students was enacted, though not mentioned in the media or in literature provided to students. On September 12, 1962, apostles Spencer W. Kimball and Mark E. Peterson and BYU President Ernest L. Wilkinson agreed on a university policy that "no one will be admitted as a student ... whom we have convincing evidence is a homosexual." They agreed to share information about individuals cases of homosexual members between general church administration and BYU administration. This policy was broadcast in Wilkinson's address to BYU in September 1965 when he stated "we [do not] intend to admit to this campus any homosexuals. ... [I]f any of you have this tendency, ... may I suggest you leave the University immediately .... We do not want others on this campus to be contaminated by your presence." The next month general authorities again privately decided that the "University does not permit any known homosexual to enter or remain at BYU", though they decided "for the purposes of admission or retention at BYU" that masturbation (or "self abuse") was "not considered homosexuality." The decision by top leaders forbidding the enrollment of homosexuals at BYU was again repeated in meetings on January 27, 1966, and January 25, 1968, and was codified in the 1967 version of the Honor code available only to administrators. The approved version read "homosexuality will not be tolerated", while the proposed sentence banning "masturbation" was removed in committee.

The complete ban on any students with a homosexual orientation was softened a decade later by Wilkinson's successor, Dallin H. Oaks, in an April 19, 1973, Board of Trustees meeting. There it was decided BYU administrators would allow for students who had repented of homosexual acts and forsaken them for a lengthy period of time. Additionally, students guilty of infrequent sexual behavior (not including fornication or adultery equivalents) who were repentant and showed evidence that the act(s) would not be repeated would be admitted while those still suspected of current same-sex sexual behavior would still be barred from remaining and enrollment.

== Surveillance and police efforts ==
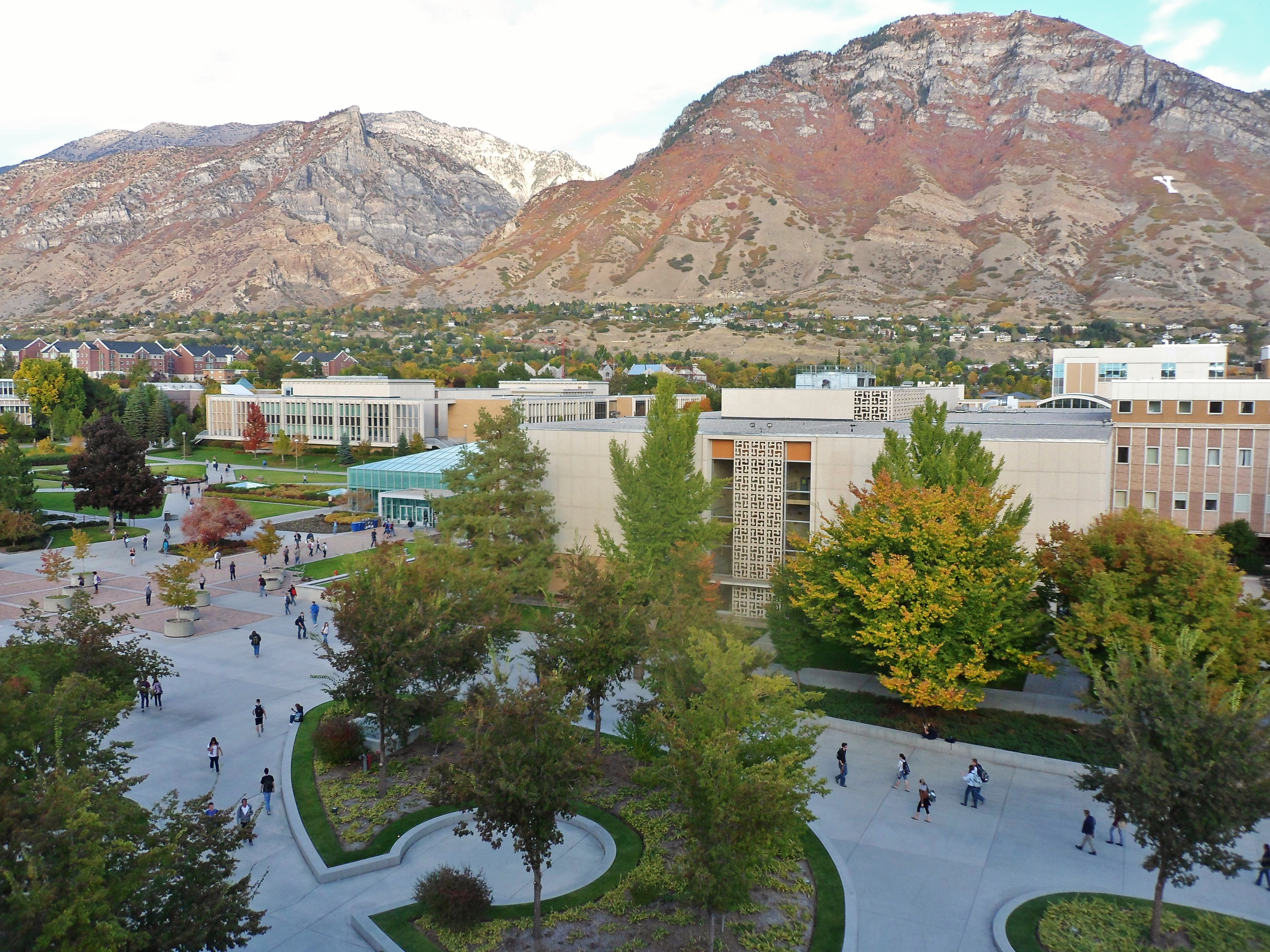
BYU bans extramarital sexual activity for straight students and further forbids any same-sex dating or physical expression of attraction including hugs for students identifying as LGBTQ.

From the mid-1960s through the early 1980s BYU police targeted gay people both on and off campus. Under Oaks, a system of surveillance and searches of dorms of problem students, including suspected homosexuals, was implemented. This included electronic recording devices which BYU Security Chief Robert Kelshaw confirmed in 1975 had been planted on students to gather information. In reference to the widespread campaign to find homosexuals among BYU students, Oaks stated, "Two influences we wish to exclude from the BYU community are active homosexuals and drug users, and these subjects are therefore among those with which our security force is concerned."

Four years later BYU's newspaper reported Oaks asking BYU security to be "especially watchful" for any student homosexual infractions. BYU's security force conducted stake outs looking for license plates of BYU students at gay bars in Salt Lake City. They also placed fake contact advertisements in a gay Salt Lake City newspaper to entrap gay students. This resulted in the arrest of David Chipman who was no longer a BYU student at that time. The director of public relations for the university stated that by 1979 Oaks ordered BYU security to stop surveilling gay bars and to cease posting entrapment advertisements. According to one source the "gay purges" by BYU police continued through the early 1980s.

== Values Institute ==
In September 1976 top church leaders on the BYU Board of Trustees approved BYU president Dallin H. Oaks's Institute for Studies in Values and Human Behavior dedicated most heavily to search for evidence supporting church views on homosexuality. The primary assignment was writing a church-funded book on homosexuality to be published by a non-church source (in order to boost the book's scientific credibility). BYU psychologist Allen Bergin acted as the director and book author. Institute member and church Social Services director Victor Brown Jr. wrote, "Our basic theme is that truth lies with the scriptures and prophets, not with secular data or debate." Several dissertations were produced by the Values Institute before it closed in 1985.

== Payne Papers ==
In 1977, gay BYU student Cloy Jenkins and gay BYU instructor Lee Williams coauthored an open letter to refute the anti-gay teachings of BYU professor Reed Payne. The anonymous letter was later published with the help of Lee's gay brother Jeff and Ricks College faculty member Howard Salisbury as the "Payne Papers" pamphlet (later titled "Prologue"). This was anonymously mailed to all high-ranking LDS leaders and most BYU and Ricks College faculty causing a controversy. This elicited a response from apostle Boyd K. Packer in the form of his "To the One" 1978 BYU address on homosexuality and an article from the recently formed BYU Values Institute.

== Policies and punishments in the 1990s and early 2000s ==
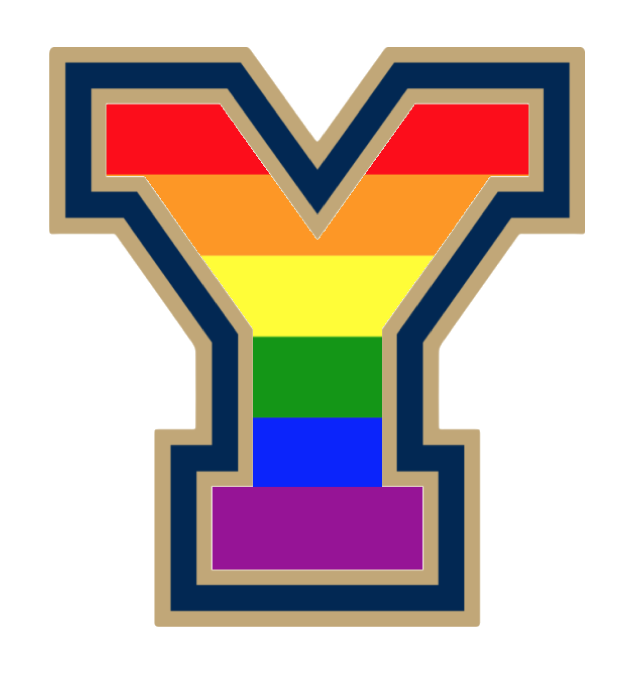
A gay pride parody of the "Y" logo

In the late 1990s an explicit reference to "homosexual conduct" was added to the publicly available text of the BYU Honor Code for the first time. In 1997 Honor Code Office director Rush Sumpter stated that BYU forbade actions of verifiable, overt displays of homosexual affection, but does not punish attractions. One student stated she tried to pray her feelings away, and another said her parents sent her to BYU to straighten out her homosexual feelings.

In 2000 a reported 13 students were kicked off campus when caught watching the TV series Queer As Folk. The next year two gay students (Matthew Grierson and Ricky Escoto) were expelled under accusations deemed "more probable than not" of hand-holding or kissing. The Associate Dean of Students Lane Fischer over the BYU Honor Code Office stated in a letter to those two students that it was "inappropriate" for a BYU student to "advocate for the [homosexual] lifestyle" by publishing material or participating in public demonstrations as well as advertising one's "same-sex preference in any public way" reinforcing the existing honor code ban on coming out for lesbian, gay, or bisexual students. He also required homosexual students facing discipline to refrain from same-sex "dating, holding hands, kissing, romantic touching, showering, clubbing, ets., as well as regular association with homosexual men."

== Current policies ==
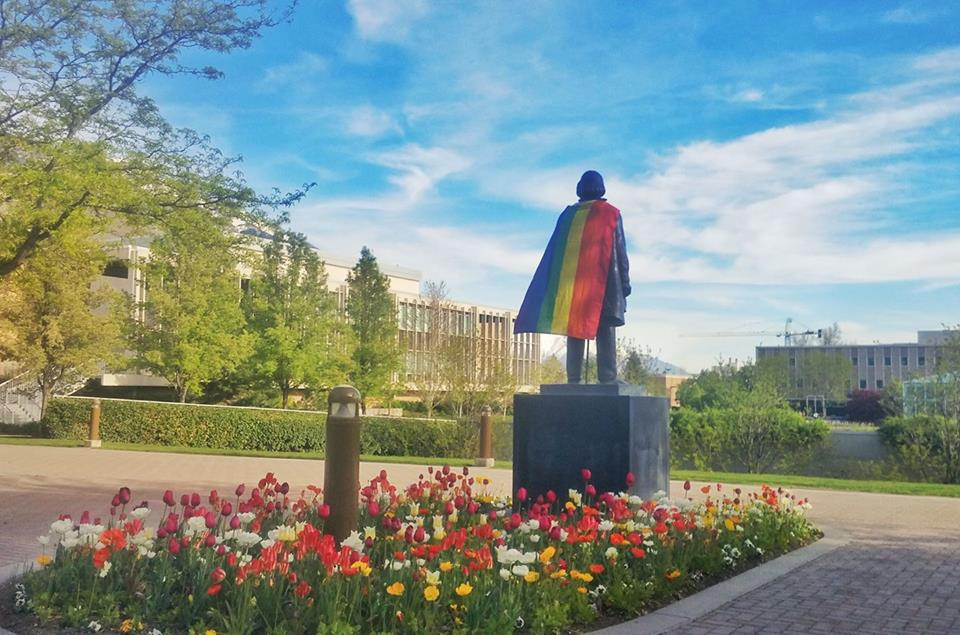
A gay superhero parody of BYU's Brigham Young statue

BYU continues to ban same-sex romantic behavior such as dating, holding hands, and kissing as of August 2023. In 2007, BYU changed the honor code to read that stating one's sexual orientation was not an honor code issue while removing the phrase that "any behaviors that indicate homosexual conduct, including those not sexual in nature, are inappropriate and violate the Honor Code." The change also clarified the policy on advocacy of LGBTQ rights or romantic relationships. Several students, including those identifying as LGBTQ, thought that the previous wording was confusing and unclear.

While both homosexuals and heterosexuals must abide by the church's law of chastity (i.e. no sexual relations outside of marriage, no crude language, and no pornography), the Honor Code additionally prohibits all forms of physical intimacy that give expression to homosexual feelings (e.g. dating, hugging, hand holding, or kissing) as of 2022. There is no similar restriction against expressing heterosexual feelings. The policy on homosexuality was not noted in the online version of the honor code available to students until the fall of 2009. Both this version and the 2010 versions contained a clause banning homosexual advocacy defined as "seeking to influence others to engage in homosexual behavior or promoting homosexual relations as being morally acceptable."

In early 2011, BYU quietly removed the clause prohibiting advocacy. However, in 2021 BYU fired Sue Bergin and the next year BYU's sister school BYU-Idaho (also run by the Church Educational System) fired two employees Lindsay Call and Ben Buswell all for allegedly expressing concerns over church teachings around LGBTQ people. BYU continues to ban LGBTQ student groups from meeting on campus as of 2022. During an off-campus September 2022 BYU LGBTQ student "Back to School Pride Night", 100 protesters (many also BYU students) gathered and yelled slurs at the 300 LGBTQ BYU students and friends in attendance.

A 2021 BYU-conducted survey of its students found that 74% of the 13,000 respondents experienced or witnessed "derogatory remarks about LGBTQ+ people" within the past year, and one in four LGBTQ students surveyed said they did not feel safe on campus. Carolyn Gassert, president of the LGBTQ BYU student group USGA, said most of the queer students at BYU are used to the vitriol and "hear these comments in the classroom."

=== Policies around gender expression ===
As for gender diverse students, policies remain unclear, and as of 2017 a BYU spokesperson has only stated that "transgender students are handled on a case-by-case basis." One openly transgender student has tried discussing policies with the Honor Code office, but they ignored his emails. No publicly available BYU policy seems to be in place for students transitioning with hormone therapy, or for an assigned-male-at-birth student expressing a gender identity as a woman through clothing, makeup, or long hair. However, faculty are instructed as of December 2017 that a female with a shaved head, or a male with long nails, brightly dyed hair, or makeup would be violating the Honor Code and should be reported to the Honor Code Office. In 2017, a non-binary BYU graduate did not report being sexually assaulted as a student by their BYU teaching assistant in part because of fear of how the Honor Code office may surveil and distrust non-cisgender students, as well as assault victims.

== BYU LGBTQ student groups ==
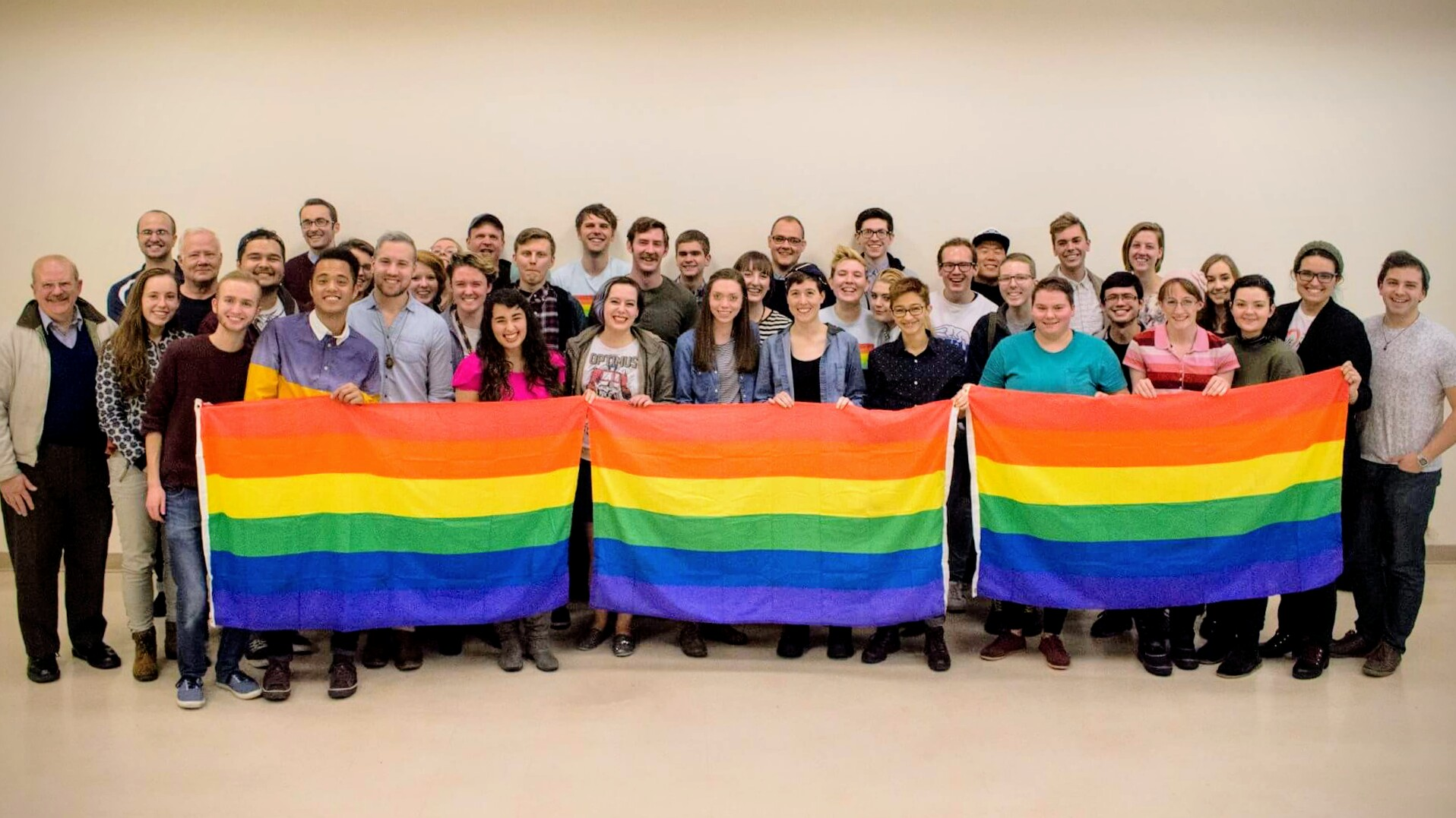
LGBTQ BYU students at a USGA meeting in 2017

In 2010, a group called USGA (Understanding Sexuality, Gender, and Allyship), consisting of BYU students and other members of the Provo community, began meeting on campus to discuss issues relating to homosexuality and the LDS Church. However, by December 2012, USGA was told it could no longer hold meetings on BYU's campus and BYU continues to ban USGA from meeting on campus as of 2022.

In 2021, groups named Raynbow Collective and Cougar Pride Center were started to address the increasing needs of queer students. These groups began supplementing the work by USGA through additional resources and events.

== Research at BYU around LGBTQ topics ==
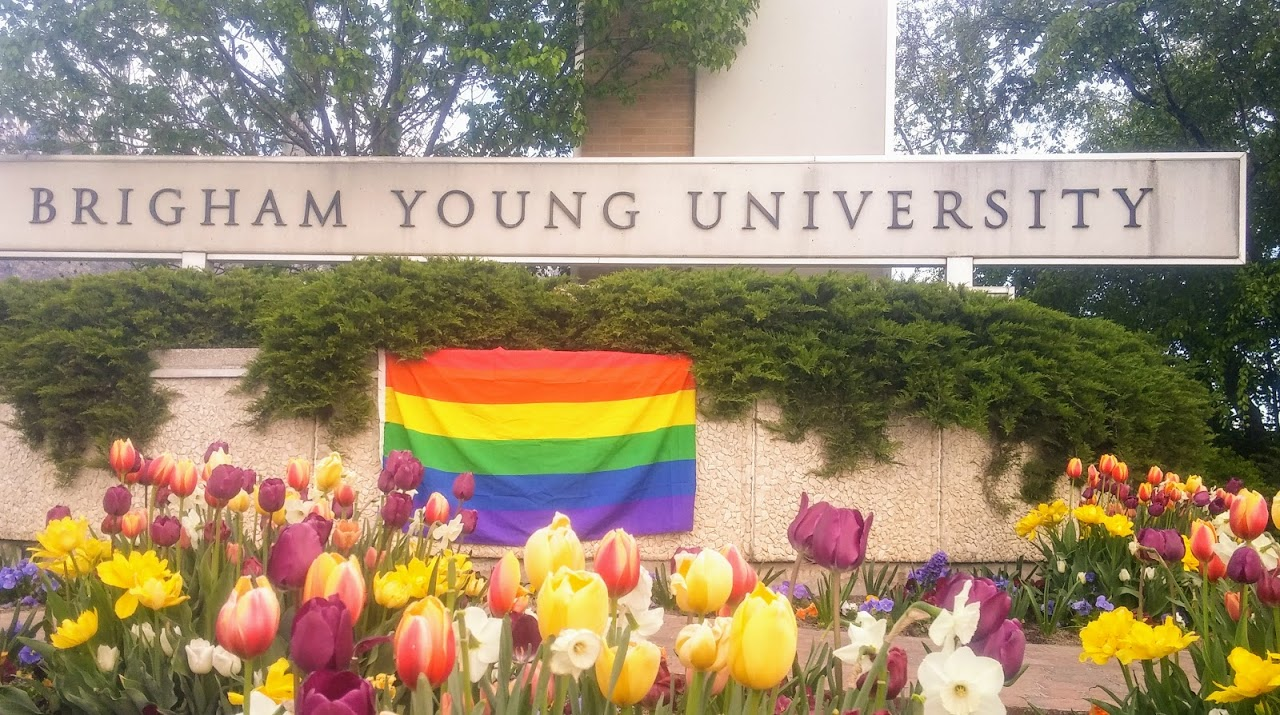
Research has shown a consistent presence of LGBTQ students attending BYU.

In 1950, 1961, and 1972 BYU Sociology professor Wilford E. Smith conducted a survey of thousands of Mormon students at several universities including many from the BYU sociology department as part of a larger survey. His data spanning over 20 years found that 10% of BYU men and 2% of BYU women indicated having had a "homosexual experience." He also found that "the response of Mormons [at BYU] did not differ significantly from the response of Mormons in state universities."

An informal poll of students in 1991 by an independent BYU newspaper found that 5% of students identified their sexual orientation as gay (similar to the 4% estimate by a BYU counselor in 1979), and 22% of all students knew of a BYU student who was gay or lesbian.

In 1997 a poll of over 400 BYU students found that 42% of students believed that even if a same-sex attracted person keeps the honor code they should not be allowed to attend BYU and nearly 80% said they would not live with a roommate attracted to people of the same sex.

In 2003 BYU's newspaper cited two LDS therapists who stated that "somewhere around 4 to 5 percent" of BYU students are gay.

A BYU Spring 2017 survey taken by 42% of students found that 0.2% of the 12,602 who completed the survey (or 25 responders) reported their gender identity being transgender or something other than cisgender male or female. For comparison, a 2017 meta-analysis of 20 separate large surveys (with sample sizes ranging from over 30,000 US adults to over 165,000 each) found a conservative estimate of 0.4% for the portion of US adults who self-identify as transgender. A 2020 survey of 7,625 BYU students found that over 13% (996) of those surveyed indicated that their sexual orientation was something other than "strictly heterosexual."

== Aversion therapy at BYU ==
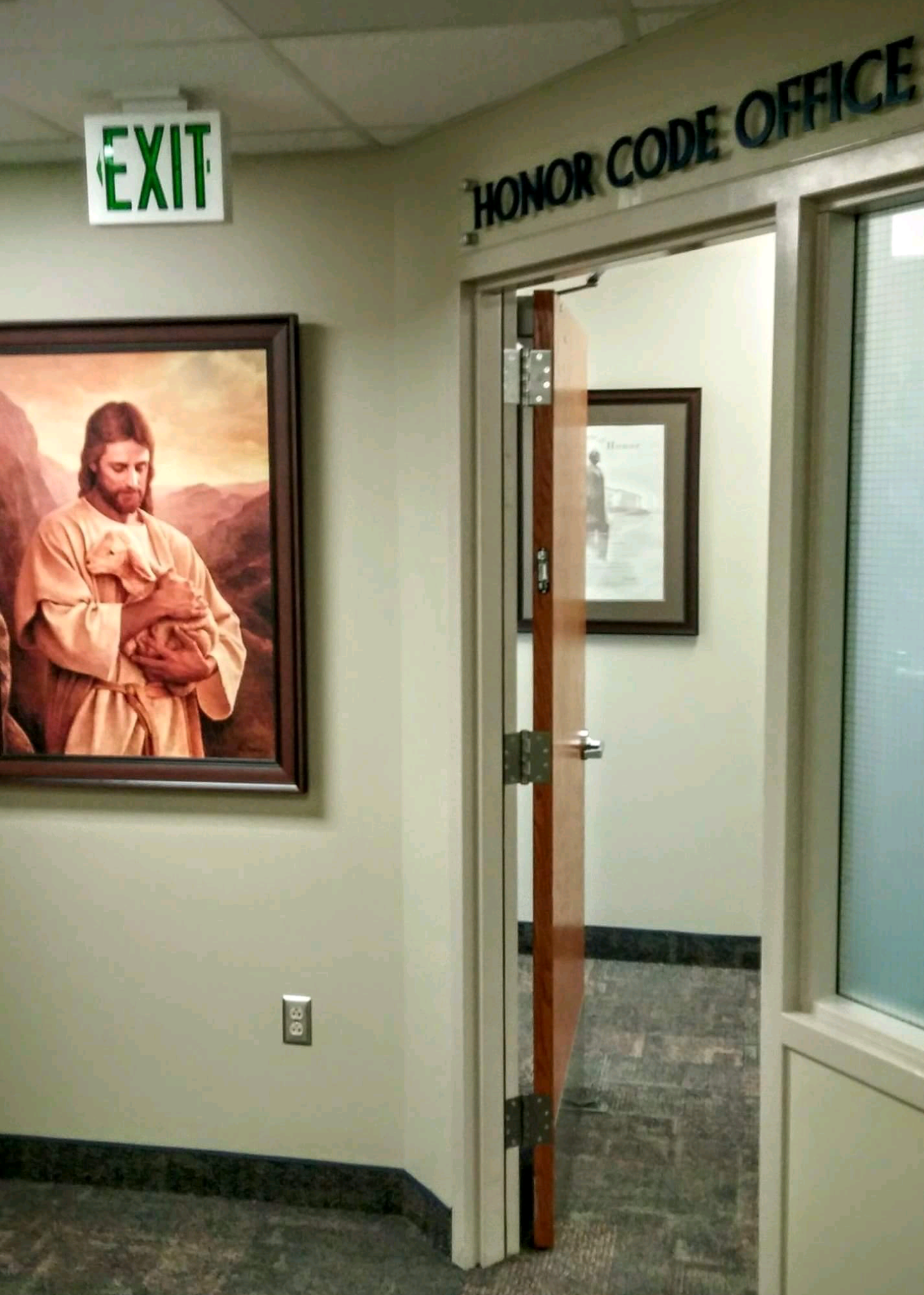
BYU's Honor Code office required some students reported for homosexual behavior to undergo electroshock and vomit aversion therapies in the 1970s. The on-campus program lasted into the mid-90s.

An intervention-style approach to "curing" homosexuality by therapists and unlicensed individuals gradually emerged in the LDS community as it became clear that the church leaders' self-help recommendations were not working. One of the main efforts was BYU's aversion therapy program from 1959 to the mid-90s which used mostly electrical shocks to the arm or genitals, or sometimes induced-vomiting while showing the participants erotic imagery. Shortly after the May 21, 1959, meeting of BYU president Ernest Wilkinson and apostles on the executive committee of the Church Board of Education discussing the "growing problem in our society of homosexuality" BYU began administering "aversion therapy" to "cure", "repair", or "reorient" homosexual feelings among Mormon males. The on-campus aversion therapy program lasted through the 1960s, 70s, 80s, and into the mid-1990s. BYU mental health counselors, LDS bishops, stake presidents, mission presidents, general authorities, and the BYU Standards Office (equivalent to today's Honor Code Office) all referred young men to the BYU program. Because of religious considerations, on September 22, 1969, BYU administration decided to reduce the amount of the on-campus "electrical aversive therapy" used to treat (among other things) what was deemed "sexual deviancy", though, the program continued.

From 1971 to 1980 BYU's president Dallin H. Oaks had Gerald J. Dye over the University Standards Office (renamed the Honor Code Office in 1991). Dye stated that during that decade part of the "set process" for homosexual BYU students referred to his office for "less serious" offenses was to require that they undergo some form of therapy to remain at BYU, and that in special cases this included "electroshock and vomiting aversion therapies."

In an independent BYU newspaper article two men describe their experience with the BYU Aversion therapy program during the early 1970s. After confessing to homosexual feelings they were referred to the BYU Counseling Center where the electroshock aversion therapy took place using pornographic pictures of males and females. Jon, one of the individuals, implied that the treatment was completely ineffective. The experiences match most reports which state that shock therapy was ineffective in changing sexual orientation.

From 1975 to 1976 Max Ford McBride, a student at BYU, conducted electroshock aversion therapy on 17 men (with 14 completing the treatment) using a male arousal measuring device placed around the penis and electrodes on the bicep. He published a dissertation on the use of electrical aversive techniques to treat ego-dystonic homosexuality. The thesis documents the use of "Electrical Aversion Therapy" on 14 homosexual men using a "phallometric" apparatus, "barely tolerable" shocks, and "nude male visual-cue stimuli." Although it is not publicly published whether all top LDS Church leaders were aware of the electroshock aversion therapy program, it is known that apostles Spencer W Kimball, Mark E. Peterson, and now apostle Dallin H. Oaks were, and leaders involved in LDS Social Services thought the therapy was effective. At the time, homosexuality was considered by the medical community as a psychiatric condition, and aversion therapy was one of the more common methods used to try to change it. In 1966, Martin Seligman had conducted a study at the University of Pennsylvania that demonstrated positive results, which led to "a great burst of enthusiasm about changing homosexuality [that] swept over the therapeutic community." After flaws were demonstrated in Seligman's experiments, aversion therapy fell out of popularity, and in 1994 the American Medical Association issued a report that stated "aversion therapy is no longer recommended for gay men and lesbians."

Participant in the 1975–76 BYU study Don Harryman wrote that he experienced "burns on [his] arms and ... emotional trauma." Another participant, John Clarence Cameron, who wrote a play called "14" about his experiences, said "it didn't change anything except increase my self-loathing. I didn't know the ramifications of the experiment until years later." Cameron stated that he "would like everyone to tell the truth, admit the mistakes that took place, and stop trying to act like it didn't happen" Another one of the test subjects described his experiences, stating "No one wanted to change more than I did. I did everything within my power to change, and it didn't alter my homosexuality one whit. All I had learned to do was suppress much of my personality ... I was shutting down, turning off.... I was making my life miserable by a pervasive denial of who I am."

Connell O'Donovan, Val Mansfield and Drew Staffanson described undergoing aversion therapy and Raymond King describes his involvement as an intern with the BYU psychology department's electroshock aversion therapy program in the 1996 short documentary Legacies. The documentary 8: The Mormon Proposition also contains an interview wherein Bruce Barton states that BYU coerced him into vomit aversion therapy, as well as electroshock therapy, which later precipitated his suicide attempt. Jayce Cox also reported his experience with BYU shock therapy and suicidal ideation in articles and an MTV documentary. Scott Burton discusses the burn marks on his wrists he developed when undergoing electroshock therapy from ages 13 to 15 at the hands of a Mormon therapist by request from his Mormon parents.

In 2011 BYU admitted to the past use of electroshock therapy but denies that it had ever used vomit-inducing therapy "in the BYU Counseling Center" (which has been in the Wilkinson Student Center since 1964). However, the students that underwent the treatment have stated that the vomit therapy took place in the basement of the Psychology department's Joseph F. Smith Family Living Center (built in 1957, demolished in 2002). In 2021 Dallin Oaks claimed that electroshock aversion therapy "never went on under my administration" at BYU while he was the university's president from 1971 to 1980, while a BYU student produced a master's thesis on the electroshock program at BYU in 1976.

== Conversion therapy at BYU ==
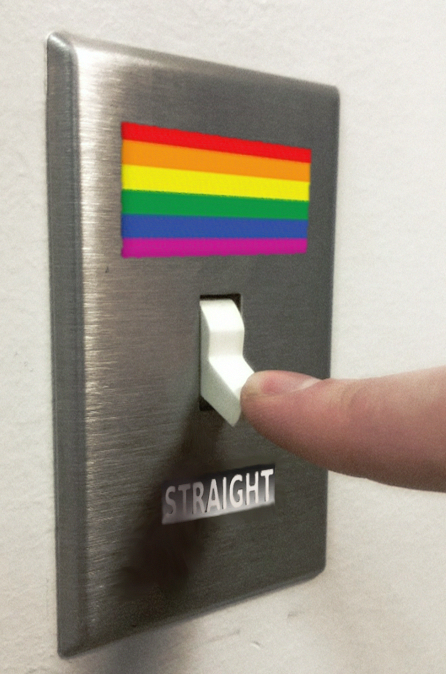
Church leaders taught for decades that members could and should try to "turn off" gay attractions through means including conversion therapy. The 2011 Broadway musical The Book of Mormon satirized these teachings with an LDS missionary character saying he could "turn it off like a light switch" in reference to his gay feelings.

In 2016, the church's official website declared that conversion therapy, also known as sexual orientation change efforts (SOCE), are "unethical." This statement is echoed by studies on the harmful effects of SOCE. Prior to this change in stance BYU ecclesiastical leaders and Honor Code office administrators have encouraged or required students with homosexual feelings to undergo conversion therapy, sometimes under threat of expulsion. This therapy focused on diminishing same-sex romantic attraction sometimes happened on campus by church-employed therapists.

For example, National Geographic journalist Andrew Evans has discussed the compulsory year of conversion therapy and "traumatic moments" BYU made him undergo in the late 90s as a student after he was caught kissing a man by his roommate. BYU told him he could be expelled or visit weekly with his bishop, turn in fellow gay students, cut off contact with any gay friends, and have frequent visits with a BYU therapist until he was heterosexual and "safe" for other students to be around. Included in the therapy was weekly dates with women as an additional attempt to change his attractions.

Similarly, LGBTQ activist Michael Ferguson also discussed the many years and different modalities of expensive conversion therapy he underwent (including with a BYU psychologist) starting with a 2004 recommendation from his BYU bishop. He was told by local church leaders that many had "overcome" and diminished their same-sex romantic feelings and their "addiction" to those of the same sex. Ferguson believed that through this he could follow church teachings and marry a woman and enter the highest degree of glory in the afterlife. Much of the therapy focused on repairing alleged emotional damage from things deemed to cause homosexuality like an overbearing mother, distant father, and rejection from same-sex peers.

== Timeline of BYU LGBTQ History ==
Below is a brief timeline of major events at the intersection of LGBTQ topics and BYU. Before 1959, there was little explicit mention of homosexuality by BYU administration.

=== 1940s ===
- 1948 – Gay BYU student Earl Kofoed, who went to BYU from 1946 to 1948, reports a "live and let live" attitude of leaders towards LGBTQ Mormons, and describes a thriving gay community at BYU. He states that there were no witch hunts, excommunications, or pressure to change one's sexual orientation at BYU like there would be in later decades.

=== 1950s ===
- 1959 – BYU begins their on-campus electroshock and vomit aversion therapy program for males experiencing same-sex sexual attractions.

=== 1960s ===
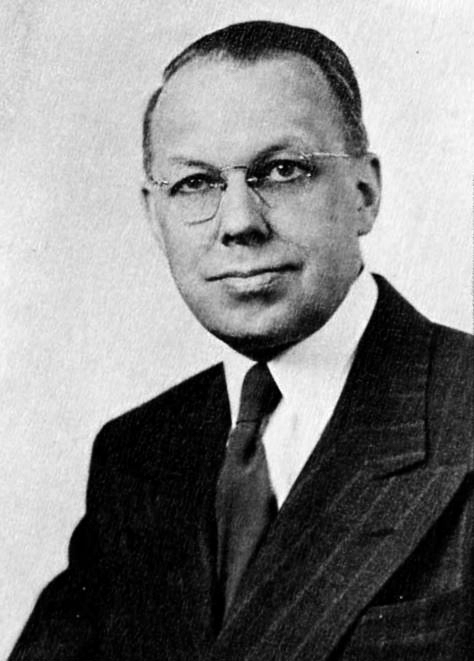
Under BYU president Ernest L. Wilkinson, any non-straight students were banned from attending the university.

- 1962 – The apostles Spencer W. Kimball and Mark E. Peterson tell BYU president Ernest L. Wilkinson that no student suspected of experiencing homosexual feelings should be allowed to attend BYU.
- 1962 – BYU president Ernest L. Wilkinson states in a speech to the student body that people with homosexual feelings will not be allowed to enroll or remain as students, since they contaminate the campus.
- 1964 – Apostle Kimball addresses seminary and institute faculty and calls homosexuality a "malady", "disease", and an "abominable and detestable crime against nature" that is "curable" by "self mastery." He cites one lay bishop (a businessman by trade) assigned by the church to administer a "program of rehabilitation" through which there had been "numerous cures." He says "the police, the courts, and the judges" have referred "many cases directly" to the church.
- 1965 – Kimball again addresses homosexuality in a BYU speech stating BYU "will never knowingly enroll ... nor tolerate ... anyone with these tendencies who fails to repent", and that it is a "damnable heresy" for a homosexual person to say "God made them that way."
- 1965 – Five suicides of gay male BYU students are reported in one year.
- 1967 – After a policy change allowing BYU bishops to share confidential information gained from the students during interviews with BYU administration took place, a dramatic rise in students suspected of homosexual activity is reported, totaling 72 recorded by BYU administration by the end of August 1968. Security files are kept by BYU on students suspected of being gay and students were encouraged to spy on other students.

=== 1970s ===
- 1973 – It is decided by the BYU Board of Trustees that the ban on people attracted to those of the same sex will be lifted and they may enroll at BYU with local church leadership permission as long as they are not sexually expressing their attractions.
- 1973 – BYU psychology professor Allen Bergin publishes an article in the July New Era portraying some homosexuals as "psychologically disturbed persons" who are "compulsively driven to frequent and sometimes bizarre acts." Bergin discusses the behaviorist sexual orientation change efforts he used in an attempt to change their same-sex sexual behavior and attractions.

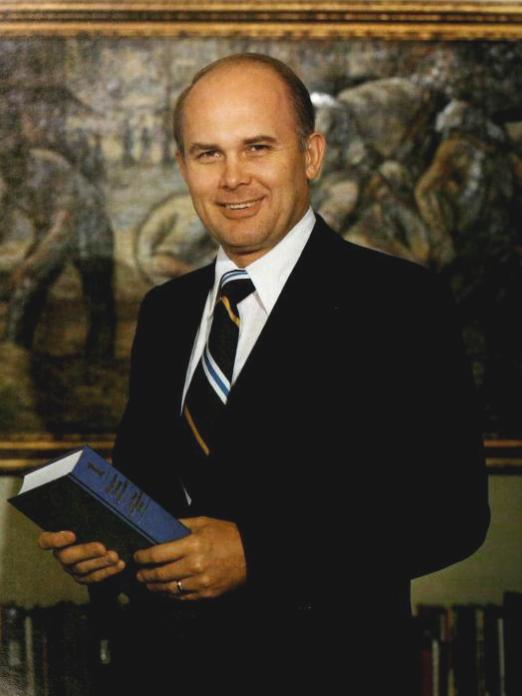
BYU president Oaks instituted a system of surveillance to identify and expel or attempt to "cure" homosexual students in the '70s.

- 1974 – BYU president Oaks delivers a speech on campus in which he speaks in favor of keeping criminal punishment for "deviate sexual behavior" such as private, consensual, same-sex sexual activity. The speech is later printed by the university's press.
- 1974 – Church president Kimball addresses the BYU student body stating that sex reassignment surgeries are an appalling travesty.
- 1976 – BYU begins a purge in January to expel homosexual students as part of president Oaks' widespread campaign to curtail the influence of homosexual people on campus. The purge includes interrogations of fine arts and drama students and surveillance of Salt Lake City gay bars by BYU security.
- 1976 – BYU music professor Carlyle Marsden takes his own life two days after being outed by an arrest for alleged homosexual activity.
- 1976 – A 20-year study by a BYU Sociology professor is published, showing that 10% of BYU men and 2% of BYU women indicated having had a "homosexual experience." In 1950, 1961, and 1972 Wilford E. Smith conducted a survey of thousands of Mormon students at several universities including many from the BYU sociology department as part of a larger survey. He found that "the response of Mormons [at BYU] did not differ significantly from the response of Mormons in state universities."
- 1977 – After hearing anti-gay rhetoric from BYU professor Reed Payne, BYU student Cloy Jenkins and gay BYU instructor Lee Williams produces the Payne Papers (later called Prologue) outlining information and experiences in defense of homosexual Mormons. It is later anonymously mailed to all high-ranking church leaders.

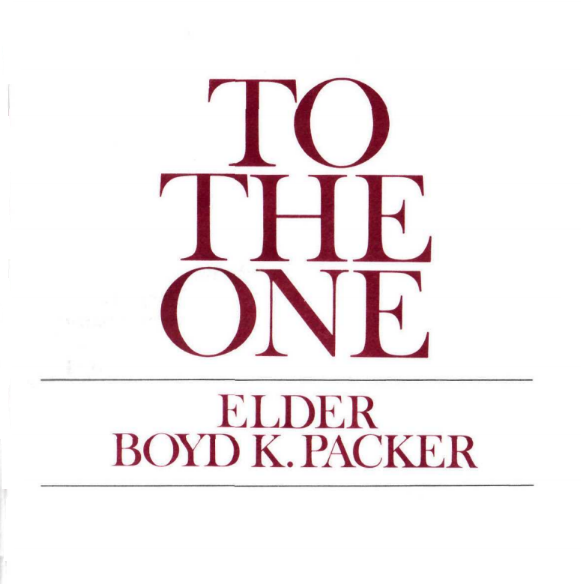
Pamphlet cover to a reprint of Packer's BYU speech on homosexuality.

- 1978 – The apostle Boyd K. Packer delivers a sermon at BYU on March 5 entitled "To the One", which went on to be published by the church as a pamphlet. Packer characterizes homosexual interaction as a perversion and presents the possibility that it had its roots in selfishness and could be cured with "unselfish thoughts, with unselfish acts."

Three text advertisements placed by BYU security in a gay Salt Lake City monthly newspaper in order to entrap gay students.

- 1978 – In November BYU Security begins placing entrapment ads in a monthly Salt Lake City LGBTQ newspaper to ensnare BYU students. This results in the 1979 arrest of David Chipman, a former BYU student, who made a romantic advance after being taken on a drive by undercover BYU security agent David Neumann, who was posing as a gay BYU student. Chipman's controversial conviction due to the security officers making an arrest outside their jurisdiction for an entrapment case went to the Utah State Supreme Court.
- 1979 – Under the guidance of BYU president Dallin H. Oaks, BYU security begins campaigns to entrap any students participating in same-sex sexual behavior and purge them from the university.
- 1979 – BYU's newspaper publishes a series of articles in April quoting BYU and church leaders and gay students on homosexuality. The series includes comments by Maxine Murdock of the BYU Counseling Center and Ford McBride, a former psychology student who conducted BYU electroshock aversion experiments on fourteen gay BYU students. McBride and Murdock estimated that 4% of BYU students (or around 1,200 students) are homosexual.

=== 1980s ===
- 1982 – The Church-owned television station KBYU refuses to air the third segment of a documentary on homosexuality in Utah in part because it contains interviews of anonymous gay BYU students.
- 1982 – In an address to BYU on August 28, then president of Ricks College Bruce C. Hafen counsels students to avoid homosexuality "at all costs, no matter what the circumstances." He further cites the 1973 removal of homosexuality as a mental disorder from the DSM as an example of something gone wrong "deep within our national soul."
- 1986 – BYU publishs a study by BYU professor and area Church Welfare Services director Victor Brown Jr. stating that people can eliminate homosexual feelings.
- 1986 – An article is published referencing a gay BYU student who had been preparing for an opposite-sex temple marriage in the 80s under counsel from BYU professor and stake president Richard H. Cracroft. A few months into the marriage, the man died by suicide, and Cracroft stated that "Admittedly, not many of us know how to counsel homosexuals."

=== 1990s ===
- 1990s – Transgender woman Cammie Vanderveur, a BYU engineering student, wears a dress on campus only at night to avoid punishment.
- 1990 – The independent BYU newspaper Student Review begins publishing articles on the topic of homosexuality, dedicating an entire issue to the discussion, and frequently addressing the topic over the next four years.
- 1991 – An informal poll of students by an independent BYU newspaper finds that 5% of current students identified their sexual orientation as gay and 22% of all students knew of a BYU student who was gay or lesbian.
- 1994 – BYU publishes an anthropology masters thesis titled Cross-Cultural Categories of Female Homosexuality.
- mid-1990s – BYU's on-campus electroshock aversion therapy program, which had begun in 1959, ends over three decades later.
- 1996 – BYU Spanish professor Thomas Matthews is reported to a top LDS authority in July for previously stating that he was gay in private conversations. He stated that BYU did not like that he was out of the closet despite being celibate and keeping BYU codes of conduct, and eventually left the university.
- 1996 – A campus group for gay students and friends "Open Forum" is founded. With faculty advisor Paul Thomas, they seek but are denied official club status from BYU administrators.
- 1997 – A poll of over 400 BYU students finds that 42% of students believed that even if a same-sex attracted person keeps the honor code, they should not be allowed to attend BYU, and nearly 80% said they would not live with a roommate attracted to people of the same sex.
- 1997 – The university newspaper publishes an article featuring several openly gay students.

=== 2000s ===
- 2003 – After facing criticism from several organizations, KBYU and BYU-TV canceled the planned broadcast of LDS therapist Jeff Robinson's presentation "Homosexuality: What Works and What Doesn't Work" given at BYU's 2002 Families Under Fire conference. The talk characterized homosexuality as a serious addiction that could be cured with enough motivation, and stated that gay men can develop a sexual attraction to women if they walk away from rather than focusing on or fighting the dragon of their gayness.
- 2005 – The Foundation for Attraction Research (FAR) is founded and run by mostly BYU professors including BYU psychology professor Dean Byrd, BYU social work professor Shirley Cox, with a board of directors also consisting of BYU English professor Doris Dant, BYU law professor William Duncan, BYU religion professor John Livingstone, and retired BYU psychology professor Gawain Wells. In 2009, the organization published Understanding Same-Sex Attraction which advocated therapy to change sexual attractions. In 2012, FAR co-hosted the Reconciling Faith and Feelings conference with the Association of Mormon Counselors and Psychotherapists (AMCAP).
- 2006 – Soulforce's Equality Ride makes a stop at BYU campus in April, protesting BYU's policies towards LGBTQ students.
- 2006 – In June, BYU fires adjunct professor Jeffrey Nielsen for writing an opinion piece in support of same-sex marriage.
- 2007 – Soulforce's Equality Ride makes a second stop at BYU's campus on March 22.
- 2007 – Shortly after the Soul Force demonstration, the BYU Board of Trustees, under the direction of First Presidency member Thomas S. Monson, revises the BYU Honor Code in April to clarify that "one's stated same-gender attraction is not an Honor Code issue" while continuing to ban "all forms of physical intimacy that give expression to homosexual feelings."
- 2009 – The first explicit mention of homosexuality in the language of the school's code of conduct available to students is publicly published in the fall.

=== 2010s ===
==== 2010 ====
- 2010 – Shortly after a policy change removing the ban on LGBTQ BYU students gathering together in a group, LGBTQ and straight students begin weekly meetings on BYU campus as USGA to discuss issues relating to homosexuality and the LDS Church.

==== 2011 ====
- February – BYU's Honor Code is updated to remove the ban on any "advocacy of homosexual behavior" defined as "promoting homosexual relations as being morally acceptable."
- November – BYU fires a gay broadcasting department faculty member. The employee stated that BYU had become an increasingly hostile work environment and that being gay played into his being fired.

==== 2012 ====
- March – LGBTQ BYU students receive national attention for their "It Gets Better" video.
- April – A Sociology Department panel of LGBTQ BYU students receive press coverage as well as complaints to the university from a conservative political group.
- December – By the end of the year, USGA is banned from meeting on campus and continues to be banned as of 2018. USGA moves its meetings to the Provo City Library.

==== 2013 ====
- May – Ty Mansfield, a sexual minority Latter-day Saint who has been open about his sexuality, starts teaching as an adjunct instructor in Religious Education at BYU, where he has continued to teach since.

==== 2015 ====
- January – BYU student Andrew White is dragged from his BYU housing apartment bed by his housemates, kicked out, and verbally assaulted after coming out as gay.
- September – In a BYU Devotional address Ronald A. Rasband invites students to discuss LGBTQ rights and religious freedom and to write comments on his Facebook post. The address was later reprinted in a church magazine.
- 2015 – In a survey of 92 LGBTQ BYU students done by USGA, 52% had at some point considered self-harm.

==== 2016 ====
- January – The advocacy organization FreeBYU files an accreditation complaint to the American Bar Association against the BYU law school arguing that the honor code's prohibition of dating, romantic expression, and marriage between same-sex partners, but not their heterosexual counterparts, violated the accrediting body's anti-discrimination policies. The American Bar Association rejects the complaint after BYU made changes to its Honor Code.
- February – BYU student Harry Fisher comes out on Facebook in 2015. About two months later, after experiences of hearing anti-gay rhetoric from individuals around him, and after instances of having to leave his BYU singles ward meeting to cry in his car, he dies by suicide on February 12, 2016.
- August – BYU and Church policies on LGBTQ persons get the spotlight, as these served as a deterrent in their football team being considered as a Fall addition to the Big 12 Conference.

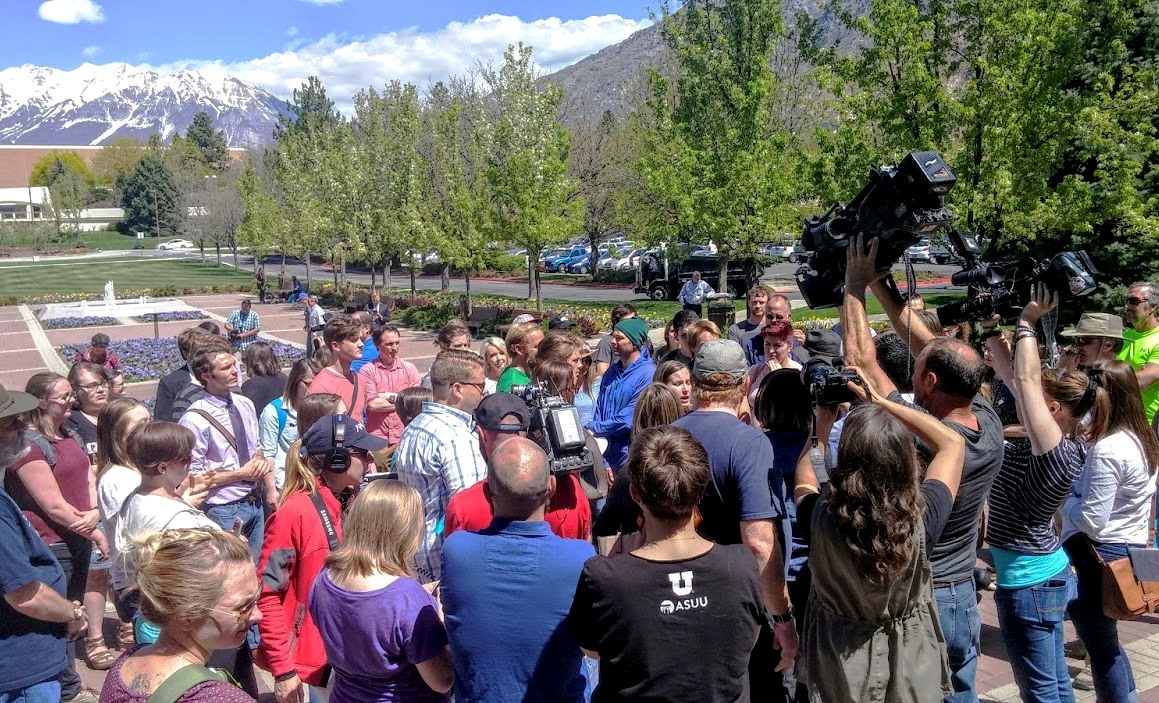
Protesters deliver 60,000 petition signatures to BYU's administration in response to reports of administrators mistreating rape and assault survivors, including LGBTQ students.

- August – During the BYU Title IX controversy around the university's policies and treatment of student survivors of sexual assault, The Salt Lake Tribune publishes an article containing firsthand accounts of several current and former LGBTQ BYU students who were sexually assaulted or raped as students and their subsequent experiences with administrators.
- November – The Provo newspaper Daily Herald publishes a series of six in-depth articles on the experiences of BYU LGBTQ students, centered around the topics of why they attend, USGA, mental health, the Honor Code, and why some leave. The articles are written over the space of two months, with an editorial conclusion at the end of the series asking administrators to listen to LGBTQ BYU students.

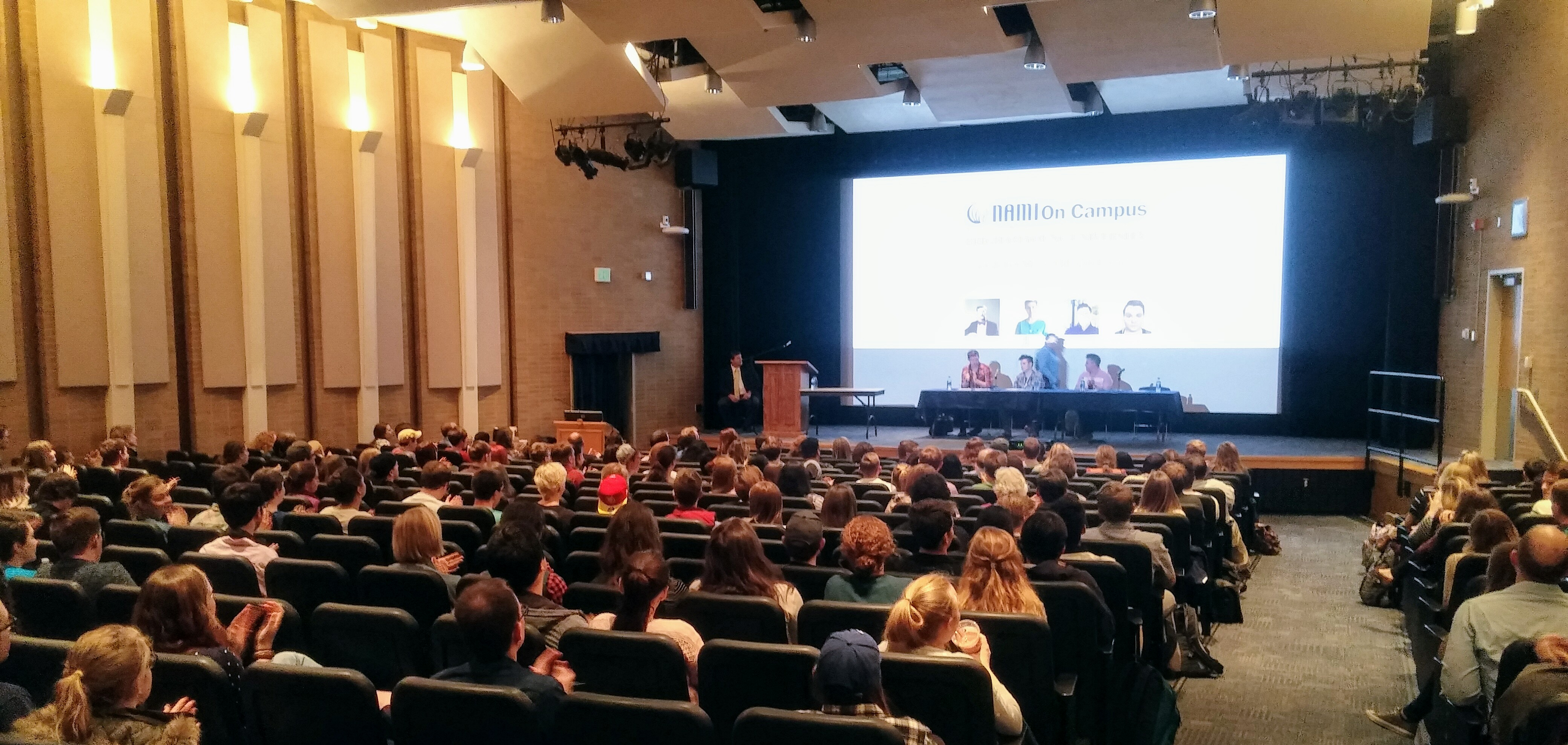
BYU's first official campus LGBTQ-specific event in April 2017.

==== 2017 ====
- April – The first LGBT-specific campus-wide event is held on the 7th by the BYU NAMI club. For comparison, a similar-sized university nearby in had its first official LGBTQ campus event and student group over 45 years before in 1971.
- September – The unofficial BYU group "Rise and Shout" holds the university's first LGBTQ alumni gathering.
- November – A BYU survey is released, having been completed by 43% of students, in which 0.2% of the 12,602 who completed the survey (or 25 responders) report that their gender identity is transgender or something other than cisgender male or female.

==== 2018 ====
- March – BYU Student Life hosts the first university-hosted LGBTQ campus event.
- April – After a controversy over BYU's policies around LGBTQ people, a conference for the US Society for Political Methodology is moved off campus citing "long-strained relations between the LGBTQ community and BYU" and concerns over the university's ban on homosexual behavior which the Society repudiated along with "the intolerance it represents."
- July – Church leaders' continued denial of BYU LGBTQ students' years of requests to form a club on campus receives national coverage.
- November – The NCAA Common Ground IV forum is hosted at BYU. The goal of this forum is to "establish inclusive and respectful athletics environments for participants of all sexual orientations, gender identities and religious beliefs.
- November – BYU's Instagram is hosted by an out gay student for a day, and he answers questions about being a gay BYU student.

==== 2019 ====
- April – At a graduation ceremony speech, the Political Science Department's valedictorian comes out as gay publicly for the first time, an event which receives national media attention.
- July – Cross country runner Emma Gee becomes the first Division I athlete in BYU's 143-year history to be publicly out after coming out as bisexual.
- November – BYU's first LGBTQ-specific on-campus center, the BYU Office of Student Success and Inclusion is formed.

=== 2020s ===
==== 2020 ====
- January – The BYU Office of Student Success and Inclusion hosts a panel focused on LGBTQ+ topics at BYU.
- February – BYU removed the ban on "homosexual behavior" from its Honor Code, which many initially think finally allows LGBTQ students to perform ordinary public displays of romantic affection, although, like straight students, they still must abstain from sexual relationships outside of marriage. However, BYU's leadership later clarifies that removing "homosexual behavior" from its Honor Code still does not permit any public displays of romantic affection towards a same-sex partner or same-sex dating, which sparks more protests from the LGBTQ community and allies.
- March – A poll of 7,625 BYU students finds that over 13% (996) of those surveyed indicated that their sexual orientation was something other than "strictly heterosexual."

==== 2021 ====
- March – Color the Campus, an LGBTQ awareness group at BYU, holds a Rainbow Day on March 4 to commemorate one year since the same-sex dating policy clarification. Rainbow Day is held about once per semester to "[show love] and support for LGBTQ+ students and faculty at all CES schools", as stated on the group's Instagram page. As part of the March 4 Rainbow Day, students light the Y in rainbow colors for about an hour.
- June – BYU Pride, a student-run LGBTQ resource center, organizes the first pride march at BYU. More than 1,000 people march from Joaquin Park to Kiwanis Park in support of queer BYU students.
- August – BYU announces the opening of the Office of Belonging with BYU president Kevin Worthen stating that the office will help combat "prejudice of any kind, including that based on ... sexual orientation." This change also means the dissolution of the Office of Student Success and Inclusion (OSSI). This move sparks fear among queer students that the new office would be tightly controlled and unable to support queer students in ways the OSSI had previously.
- August – Church apostle Jeffrey Holland makes a speech at BYU discussing LGBTQ people, in which he calls for more "musket fire" from BYU faculty in opposition to same-sex marriage, which draws criticism. In response, many gather to chalk supportive messages on sidewalks around campus for several days in a row. The chalking is met with verbal attacks from a student trying to erase the chalk. Students now "Chalk the Walk" at the beginning of each school year.
- September – Students again light the Y in anticipation of Rainbow Day and LGBTQ history month. Sources claim that BYU administration is informally supportive of the demonstration and puts BYU police on notice to protect students from counter protestors.

==== 2022 ====
- January – BYU releases a new demonstration policy that includes a ban on all demonstrations on Y mountain, ostensibly in response to the rainbow Y lightings in October and March 2021.
- February – The U.S. Department of Education dismisses the civil rights investigation of BYU regarding the university's discipline of LGBTQ students, determining that the university was acting within its rights under its approved Title IX exemptions and that the Department of Education's Office of Civil Rights lacked jurisdiction to investigate further.
- February – BYU cancels care for transgender clients receiving voice therapy at its speech clinic. The American Speech–Language–Hearing Association later issued a statement saying "BYU's decision was in direct opposition to practice expected" of accredited universities.
- March – The LDS Church announces new questions that the Church Educational System will ask religious leaders of potential new hires including, "Does this member have a testimony of [the church] and of its doctrine, including its teachings on marriage, family, and gender?"
- June – Students organize the first ever BYU-approved on-campus demonstration in support of LGBTQ students
- September – During an off-campus event by Raynbow Collective, "Back to School Pride Night", 100 protesters gather and yell slurs at the 300 LGBTQ BYU students and allies in attendance.
- October – As part of the nationwide "Strike Out Queerphobia" protest, over 150 students block off 800 N in protest of anti-LGBTQ policies.

==== 2023 ====
- March – BYU holds PEN talks, where LGBTQ students share their experiences.
- August – BYU leadership reinstates the explicit text of the ban on "same sex romantic behavior" in the institution's Honor Code.
- August – Cougar Pride Center starts a queer-inclusive choir called the "Rainbow Chorus"
- August – Supportive messages are once again chalked on sidewalks adjacent to the campus, spanning hundreds of yards, in observance of the annual tradition known as "Chalk the Walk." These chalked messages are erased, rechalked to a fuller extent, and ultimately fully erased again.

==== 2024 ====
- March – The documentary A Long Way From Heaven about and by LGBTQ BYU students premiers.

==== 2025 ====
- February – The BYU Office of Belonging holds the first official university-wide LGBTQ activity.
