= USGA (disambiguation) =

The United States Golf Association (USGA) is the governing body of golf for the United States and Mexico.

USGA may also refer to:

- Understanding Sexuality, Gender, and Allyship, an LGBTQ student group at Brigham Young University
- United States of Greater Austria, a proposed federation in 1906
- US-GA, the ISO 3166 code for the U.S. state of Georgia
- Undergraduate Student Government Association, a name of various students' unions or student governments in the United States
