= The Myth of Leadership =

2004 book by Jeffrey Nielsen

- Author: Jeffrey Nielsen
- Language: English
- Genre: Non-fiction
- Publication date: 2004
- Publication place: United States

The Myth of Leadership: Creating Leaderless Organizations is a book written by former Brigham Young University lecturer Jeffrey Nielsen, who teaches philosophy at Westminster College, Salt Lake City, Utah and at Utah Valley University, Orem, Utah.

== Basis ==
The book is based on Nielsen's concept of the "myth of leadership."

Professor Nielsen argues that we frequently use the words "leader" and "leadership" metaphorically to refer to some talent or skill that is needed, which use does little damage as well as little good. However he adds, when we use the words formally to designate officially someone as a leader or some position as involving leadership, then we create unhealthy and deleterious organizational and community relationships.

As soon as we formally designate a leader, Nielsen argues, we set up within an organization a dichotomy: two groups - to one we assign duties, and to the other we assign privileges. We confer unique and powerful privileges upon the few leaders and specify numerous duties to be obeyed by the many followers. The followers, the vast majority, are consigned to an inferior status, even to be sacrificed, if needs be, to preserve and protect the power and privilege of those designated as leaders – whether through layoffs, war, tax cuts, or even welfare reform. To the leaders, the élite few, we grant the rights and privileges to command and control the vast resources, most importantly the information and decision-making power. There are no exceptions to this split between the privileged few and the burdened many – it will occur, Nielsen believes, in any and every organization that formally designates individuals as leaders and positions as leadership positions.

Just as soon as we call someone the leader, Nielsen says, we have created a rank-based context that defines power as “power-over", even to the extent of coercion and manipulation; authority as the right to exercise power in a command-and-control manner; and hierarchy as the means of transmission of authority from the top down through privileged delegation. There is no way to avoid this - it is inevitable. Professor Nielsen relates it to what Michel Foucault might have called the discourse formation of the concept of leadership, and it is what Stephen Austin would call the speech act of leader.

The myth of leadership creates a rank-based culture where the leaders possess special privilege to speak and the followers possess an unreciprocated obligation to listen; where the leaders are entitled to monopolize information, control decision-making, and command obedience, thus establishing a culture of secrecy and inauthentic communication. The myth of leadership justifies an organization, whether political, religious, or corporate where:

- the leader speaks and the followers listen
- the leader controls information and the followers can only guess
- the leader knows and the followers only have opinions
- the leader decides and the followers just do what they're told
- the leader directs resources and the followers must make do with less and less
- the leader commands and the followers obey
- the leader is superior and the followers are inferior

== Values ==
The implications of the peer principle require that the following values be recognized, respected, and implemented:

1. openness with information – as opposed to the secrecy allowed and considered legitimate with leaders and leadership.
2. transparency in the decision-making process, which requires greater participation of all affected parties – as opposed to the top-down and behind closed door decision-making allowed and considered legitimate with leaders and leadership.
3. cooperation and sharing of management roles and responsibilities, which requires the exercise of power-in-common – as opposed to the command and control nature of the exercise of power-over allowed and considered legitimate with leaders and leadership.
4. commitment to peer deliberation as the legitimate exercise of authority – as opposed to the rank-based exercise of coercive, manipulative, or even persuasive authority allowed and considered legitimate with leaders and leadership.
