= Robert K. Thomas (literary scholar) =

Robert K. Thomas (1918–1998) was a professor of English at Brigham Young University (BYU) as well as the founder of BYU's honors program and later the academic vice president of BYU.

Thomas studied at Reed College in Oregon. It was here he saw the benefits of a small college with close interaction between students and faculty. Thomas went on to receive an M.A. from the University of Oregon and a Ph.D. in English from Columbia University. He joined the BYU faculty in 1951.

After joining the BYU faculty, Thomas convinced Ernest L. Wilkinson and other administrators to form the honors program. When the honors program was formed in 1959, he was appointed its director. In 1963 Richard D. Poll was appointed the associate director to assist Thomas. In 1965 Richard L. Bushman became a second associate director. Thomas ended his term as head of BYU's honors program in 1967 when he became academic vice president. Thomas retired from BYU in 1983. Among students who Thomas had a significant influence on while at BYU were John W. Welch, Allen E. Bergin, and Madison U. Sowell. The story of the BYU honors program and the role of Robert Thomas in founding it is recounted in detail by Kristine Hansen in A History of the Brigham Young University Honors Program: The First Fifty Years (BYU Press, 2012).

Thomas was a literary critic. His article, published in 1972, A Literary Analysis of the Book of Mormon (published in a book edited by Charles D. Tate and Truman G. Madsen) was the first significant published work to engage in literary analysis of the Book of Mormon instead of debating its origins.

Along with Bruce B. Clark Thomas co-authored the five-volume series, Out of the Best Books. He also wrote multiple articles that examined the literary qualities of the Book of Mormon.

Thomas was a member of the Church of Jesus Christ of Latter-day Saints. He served in various callings in the Church including as a bishop, stake president and president of the Australia Melbourne Mission.

The BYU Honors program offers a scholarship named for Thomas. A collection of Thomas' speeches, edited by Daryl R. Hague, was scheduled to be published by BYU Studies in 2011. BYU also has a Robert K. Thomas professorship in the J. Reuben Clark Law School, which was held by John W. Welch beginning in 1996.

== Sources ==
- Robert K. Thomas at the MLCA Database
- Wilkinson, Ernest L. and Leonard J. Arrington, ed., Brigham Young University: The First 100 Years. Provo: BYU Press, 1976. Vol. 3, p. 203, 291-293.
- BYU Studies. Vol. 49 (2010) no. 4, p. 40.
