= Command and control (disambiguation) =

Command and control (C2) is a military term with several definitions.

Command and control may also refer to:

- Command and control regulation, especially relevant in environmental economics
- Command and control (management), the maintenance of authority with somewhat more distributed decision making
- Command and control (malware), in computer security
- Command Control (event), cybersecurity event
- Command and Control (book), a 2013 book by Eric Schlosser
  - Command and Control (film), a 2016 American documentary film directed by Robert Kenner
- Command and Control Research Program, within the Office of the Assistant Secretary of Defense for Networks & Information Integration (ASD (NII))
- Global Command and Control System (GCCS), the United States' armed forces DoD joint command and control (C2) system
- Nuclear command and control, the command and control of nuclear weapons
