= Connell O'Donovan =

American historian of LGBTQ and Mormon history (born 1961)

- Born: 1961 (age 64–65); Syracuse, Utah, US
- Occupations: Historian; Biographer; Genealogist
- Website: www.connellodonovan.com

Connell O'Donovan (born in 1961) is an American historian, biographer, and professional genealogist. He was born in Utah, but spent much of his adult life in Santa Cruz, California. He has written on the history of LGBTQ Mormons, and Black Mormon history.

== Early life and education ==
He was raised in the Church of Jesus Christ of Latter-day Saints (LDS Church), and as a young man was subjected to a hypnotherapy form of sexual orientation change effort as recommended by his LDS church leaders in attempts to change his gay attractions. He served a two-year mission in Brazil, was married in the Salt Lake Temple but later divorced, and was excommunicated from the LDS Church in 1991. He studied history at the University of Utah.

== Advocacy ==
In 1990 he organized the first LGBTQ pride march in Salt Lake City, Utah. He has also advocated for Ugandan LGBTQ refugees in Utah. He has been outspoken against conversion therapy. He has published information on the LDS Church and LGBTQ people. In the late 1980s he was involved with the Gay and Lesbian Community Council of Utah (GLCCU), and was the founding director of the Lesbian and Gay Historical Society of Utah. He is currently the chair of the Mildred Berryman Institute for LGBTIQ2S+ Utah History.
