= Command Control (event) =

Cybersecurity conference hosted in Munich, Germany

Command Control (also called CMD CTRL) is an annual, multi-day summit organized by Messe München that focuses primarily on cybersecurity topics. The event was organized for the first time in 2018. The next summit was supposed to take place in Munich from March 3 to March 4, 2020. However, the corona crisis led to the cancellation of Command Control in 2020. In addition, Messe München has decided to discontinue Command Control as an independent event.

== History ==
A survey was commissioned by the organisers before the event took place. This survey showed that every second company in Germany became the target of cyberattacks in 2017. In addition, according to this study, many companies pay too little attention to their employees when defending themselves against cyber threats. The first summit took place from September 20 to September 22, 2018 in Munich (Germany).

An index (Command Control Cybersecurity-Index 2020) was created in 2019 based on surveys. According to the index, 78 percent consider a change of strategy in their company to be necessary when it comes to cyber security.

== Speakers (selection) ==
Year	Organization	Profession	Speaker
2020	Cambridge Analytica	Whistleblower	Brittany Kaiser
2020	Netflix	Head of Information Security	Jimmy Sanders
2020	IOTA	CEO	Dominik Schiener
2020	Maersk	CIO	Adam Banks
2020	Oxford Internet Institute	Professor of Internet Governance	Viktor Mayer-Schönberger
2020	Responsible Cyber	CISO on Demand	Magda Chelly
2018	Kaspersky Lab	CEO	Eugene Kaspersky
2018	SANS	Director	Lance Spitzner
2018	EU	Member of the European Parliament	Angelika Niebler
2018	Linde Group	Head of Standards and Strategy	Thomas Steinich
2018	US Department of Defense	CIO	Terry Halvorsen
2018	Siemens	Chief Cybersecurity Officer	Natalia Oropeza

== See also ==
- Cyberattack
- Cybercrime
- Computer security (Cybersecurity)
- Hacker
