= Endosex =

Opposite of intersex

- Pronunciation: American English: /ɛndoʊsɛks/
- Etymology: From endo, a Greek prefix meaning within, and sexus, a Latin suffix referring to physical and reproductive characteristics
- Meaning: Opposite of intersex
- Classification: Sex descriptor
- Characteristics: Reproductive anatomy, secondary sex characteristics, hormonal expression, and sex chromosomes aligned with sex assigned at birth
- Coined by: Heike Bödeker
- First used: 1999

Other terms
- Synonyms: Perisex, dyadic

An endosex person is someone whose innate sex characteristics fit normative medical ideas for female or male bodies. The word endosex is an antonym of intersex. Endosex is also known as dyadic or perisex.

== Etymology and meaning ==
The prefix endo- comes from the Ancient Greek ἔνδον (éndon), meaning 'inner, internal', while the term sex is derived from Latin sexus, meaning 'gender; gender traits; males or females; genitals'. The Latin term is derived from Proto-Indo-European *séksus, from *sek-, "to cut", thus meaning section or division into male and female.

Surya Monro states that the term is used to "indicate a person born with sex characteristics that are seen as typically male or female at birth, therefore not medicalized as intersex". Janik Bastien-Charlebois uses the term to identify "people whose sexual development is considered normal by medicine and society".

== Origin ==
An early English-language reference to the term endosex can be found in a symposium on intersex held at a European Federation of Sexology congress in Berlin, Germany, on June 30, 2000, where Heike Bödeker spoke on "Intersex as an ostenstion [sic] of the endosex group phantasy". Bödeker has written that she coined the term in the spring of 1999, stating in English translation:

Just as dialectically one could not be heterosexual if there were no homosexuals, just as one could not be cissexual if there were no transsexuals, so neither could one be endosex if there were not intersex people. Or more generally, one could not be "normal" at all if there were no abnormalities (mostly with the implication that there would be no "inside" if there were no "outside" – namely regarding one's position relative to the group). (Note: Heike Bödeker quotation from 2000 in the original German: Genauso wie man dialektischerweise nicht heterosexuell sein könnte, gäbe es keine Homosexuellen, wie man nicht cissexuell sein könnte, gäbe es keine Transsexuellen, so könnte man auch nicht endosexuell sein, gäbe es keine Intersexuellen. Oder auch ganz allgemeinhin, man könnte gar nicht »normal« sein, gäbe es keine Anormalität (meist mit der Implikation, es gäbe kein »drinnen«, gäbe es kein »draußen« – nämlich bezogen auf die Positionierung relativ zur Gruppe).)

== Importance and disambiguation ==
Endosex has been used to identify the importance of storytelling by intersex youth in their own words, and without being recontextualized or rewritten by non-intersex people.

The term can be distinguished from cisgender, an antonym of transgender, which is used to describe someone whose gender identity matches their sex assigned at birth. In journal articles on non-binary people by Monro and the reproductive rights of transgender people by Blas Radi, the authors use the term to help distinguish the different lived experiences of people who are both intersex and transgender from people who are transgender and not intersex.

== Usage ==
The National Academies of Sciences, Engineering, and Medicine reported in 2020 that "some advocates and providers are increasingly using the term endosex to describe people whose reproductive or secondary sex characteristics align with medical binaries."

The term has been used in intersex human rights advocacy, and in publications providing peer support, including works intended for parents of intersex children and for intersex youth.

Academic writers and peer support workers have used the concept to identify how people with intersex bodies have been obliged to adapt to societies that only accept endosex bodies. Brömdal and others state that sexuality education curricula privilege endosex bodies and experiences, promoting feelings of shame and secrecy in intersex students. In a media interview, a support group organizer states that intersex people undergo unnecessary medical examinations that would be prohibited on endosex women.

Zelada and Quesada Nicoli state that States justify cosmetic adaptation surgeries because intersex bodies cannot be understood, and that it is intersex people who must adapt to a model of "endosex privilege". Monro and others state that "entrenched and traditionalist medical and social norms impede attempts to change practices to support bodily diversity and to ensure intersex people have equal citizenship to endosex people", calling for the "co-production of knowledge" by intersex and endosex people in intersex studies.

In September 2020, Dominic Perrottet, the Treasurer of New South Wales state in Australia stated that a directive from his Department encouraging use of inclusive language was "completely unacceptable", following an official message to Treasury staff by its Economic Strategy Deputy Secretary, Joann Wilkie. Wilkie had suggested "not assuming when you're talking to a colleague that they are heterosexual/cisgendered/endosex". The Daily Telegraph reported that Perrottet wanted staff to feel included, and was unaware of the meaning of the word endosex.
