= Understanding Sexuality, Gender, and Allyship =

LGBTQ student group at Brigham Young University

USGA
- Founded: 2010; 16 years ago
- Purpose: "Strengthen families and the BYU community by providing a place for open, respectful discussions on the topic of same-gender attraction and LGBTQ issues."
- Location: Provo, Utah
- Region served: Brigham Young University student body
- Members: 100+
- Volunteers: 40+
- Website: usgabyu.com
- Formerly called: Understanding Same-Gender Attraction

USGA (Understanding Sexuality, Gender, and Allyship, previously Understanding Same-Gender Attraction) is an organization for LGBTQ Brigham Young University students and their allies. It began meeting on BYU campus in 2010 to discuss issues relating to homosexuality and The Church of Jesus Christ of Latter-day Saints (LDS Church). However, by December 2012, USGA began meeting off campus at the Provo City Library and is still banned from meeting on campus as of 2018. BYU campus currently offers no official LGBT-specific resources as of 2016. The group maintains political neutrality and upholds BYU's Honor Code. It also asks all participants to be respectful of BYU and the LDS Church. The group received national attention when it released its 2012 "It Gets Better" video. The group also released a suicide prevention message in 2013. A sister organization USGA Rexburg serves the LGBT Brigham Young University–Idaho student community in Rexburg, Idaho.

== Publicized activities ==
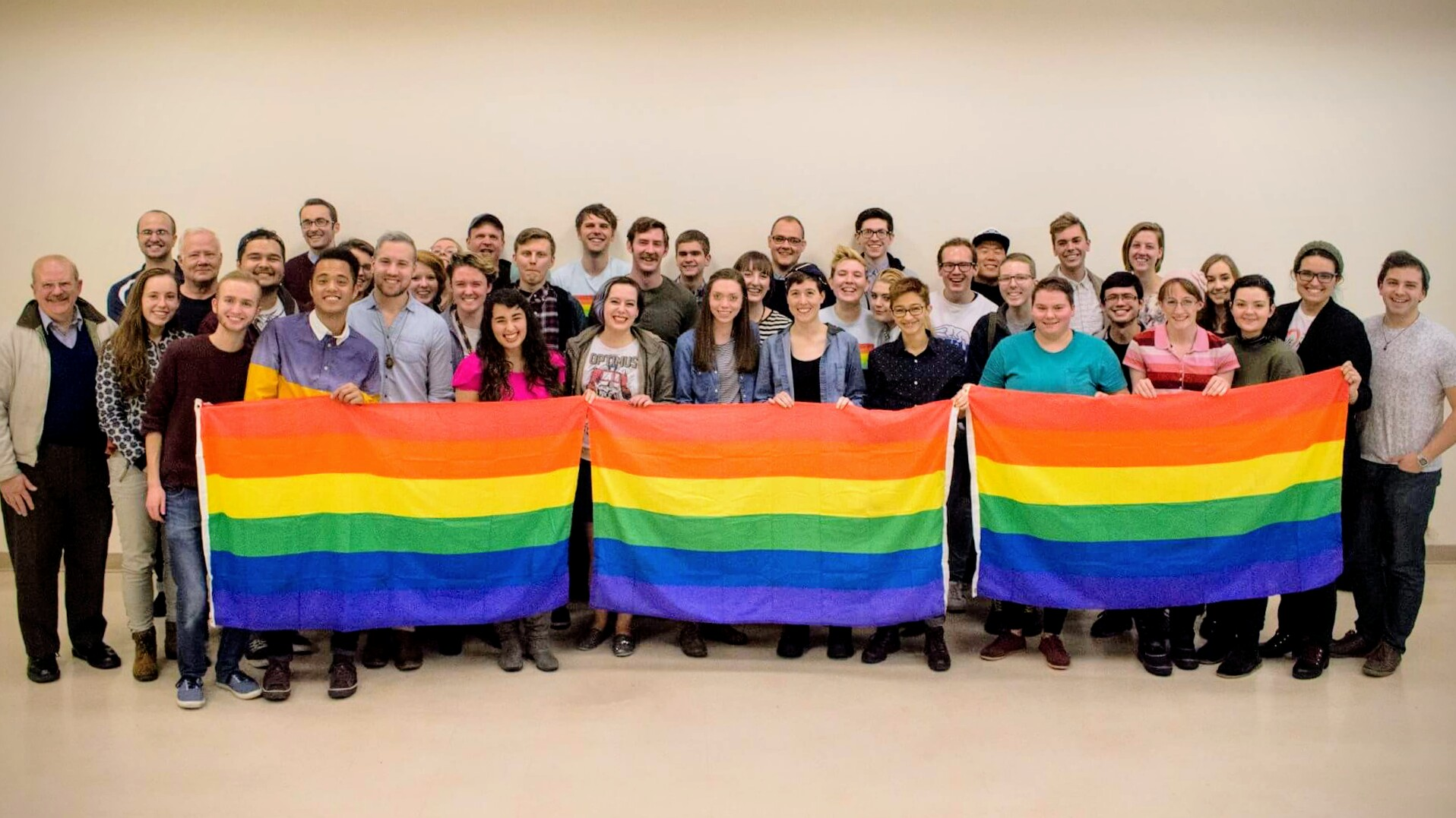
USGA participants in 2017

The group released an "It Gets Better" video in March 2012 that received press coverage. A student panel of USGA leaders held on BYU campus soon after in April by the sociology department also received press coverage as well as complaints to the university from a conservative political group.

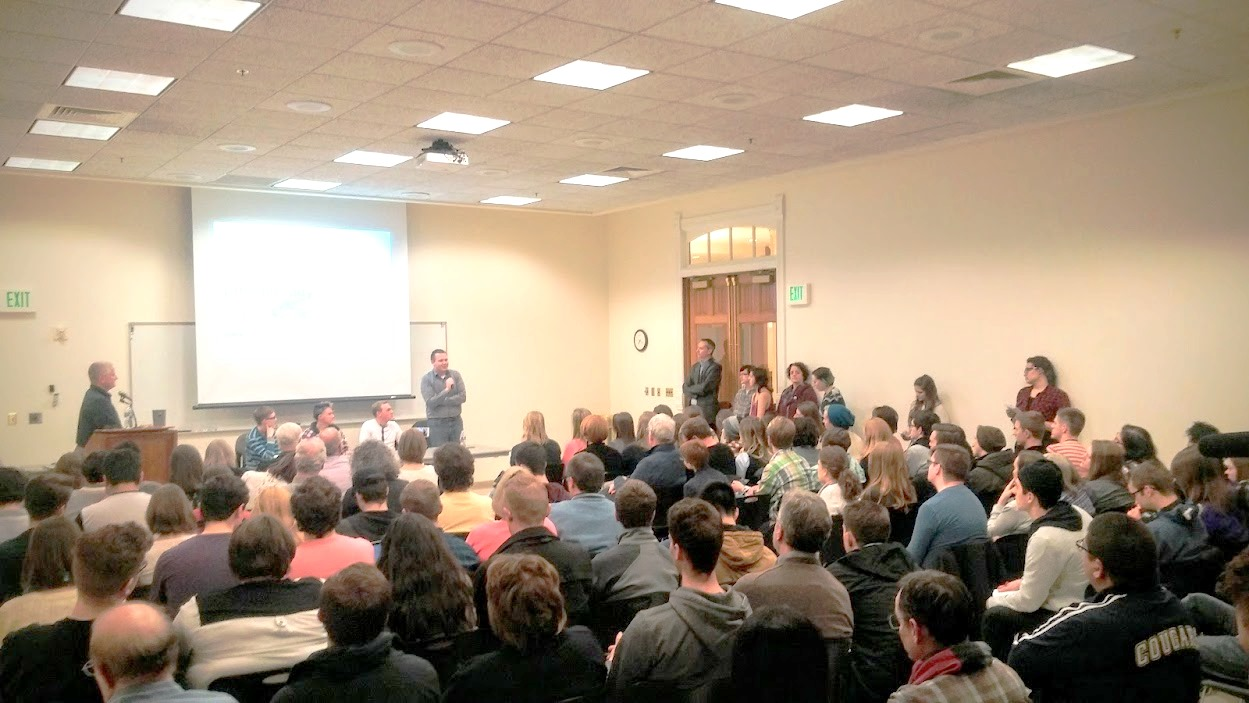
BYU LGBTQ students and allies gather at a 2017 Thursday meeting.

In 2016 the Provo newspaper Daily Herald published a series of six in-depth articles on the experiences of USGA members, centered around the topics of why they attend BYU, the USGA group, mental health, the Honor Code, and why some leave BYU. The articles were written over the space of two months, with an editorial conclusion at the end of the series asking administrators to listen to USGA BYU students.

Other activities reported by media in 2017 include their Faces of USGA photojournalism project and their Provo Pride Festival booth.

== See also ==
- Mormons Building Bridges Group
- Affirmation Group
- North Star
- Brigham Young University LGBT history
- LGBT Mormon people and organizations
