= Jeffrey Nielsen =

Jeffrey Nielsen is founder of the Democracy House Project, and a published author. He is also a philosophy instructor at Westminster College, Salt Lake City; and Utah Valley University, Orem, Utah. He is perhaps best known for being both a supporter of gay marriage and a practicing Mormon.

== Life ==
In 2006, Nielsen was a visiting lecturer of philosophy at Brigham Young University (BYU). After submitting an editorial to the Salt Lake Tribune that challenged the position of the Church of Jesus Christ of Latter-day Saints (LDS Church), BYU's sponsoring institution, on same-sex marriage, Nielsen received a letter from Daniel Graham, the head of the Department of Philosophy, stating that once term classes ended, his contract would not be renewed. In the editorial, Nielsen criticized the church's support for a constitutional amendment that would prohibit gay marriage.

BYU instructors and employees are obliged to contract themselves to not criticize the LDS Church as a condition of their employment. Nielsen was subsequently released from his duties in his local church congregation as well.

After his dismissal from BYU, Nielsen obtained positions teaching philosophy at Westminster College, Salt Lake City, Utah, and Utah Valley University, Orem, Utah.

Nielsen was educated at Weber State University and Boston College. At Boston College, he was a Teaching Fellow where he taught courses in logic and critical thinking, the history and philosophy of art and science as well as in ethics and epistemology. He has also taught in the philosophy department at Brigham Young University, where he taught courses in the ethics of leadership, reasoning and writing, as well as in the history and development of science. His teaching focuses on issues in ethics, moral decision-making, and democracy.

Nielsen is the author of the book The Myth of Leadership: Creating Leaderless Organizations. His most recent initiative has been to found the nonprofit Democracy House Project. The Democracy House Project is an educational initiative using his peer-based model to teach political literacy.

== See also ==
- American philosophy
- List of American philosophers
