= Allen Bergin =

American psychologist (1934–2024)

Allen Eric Bergin
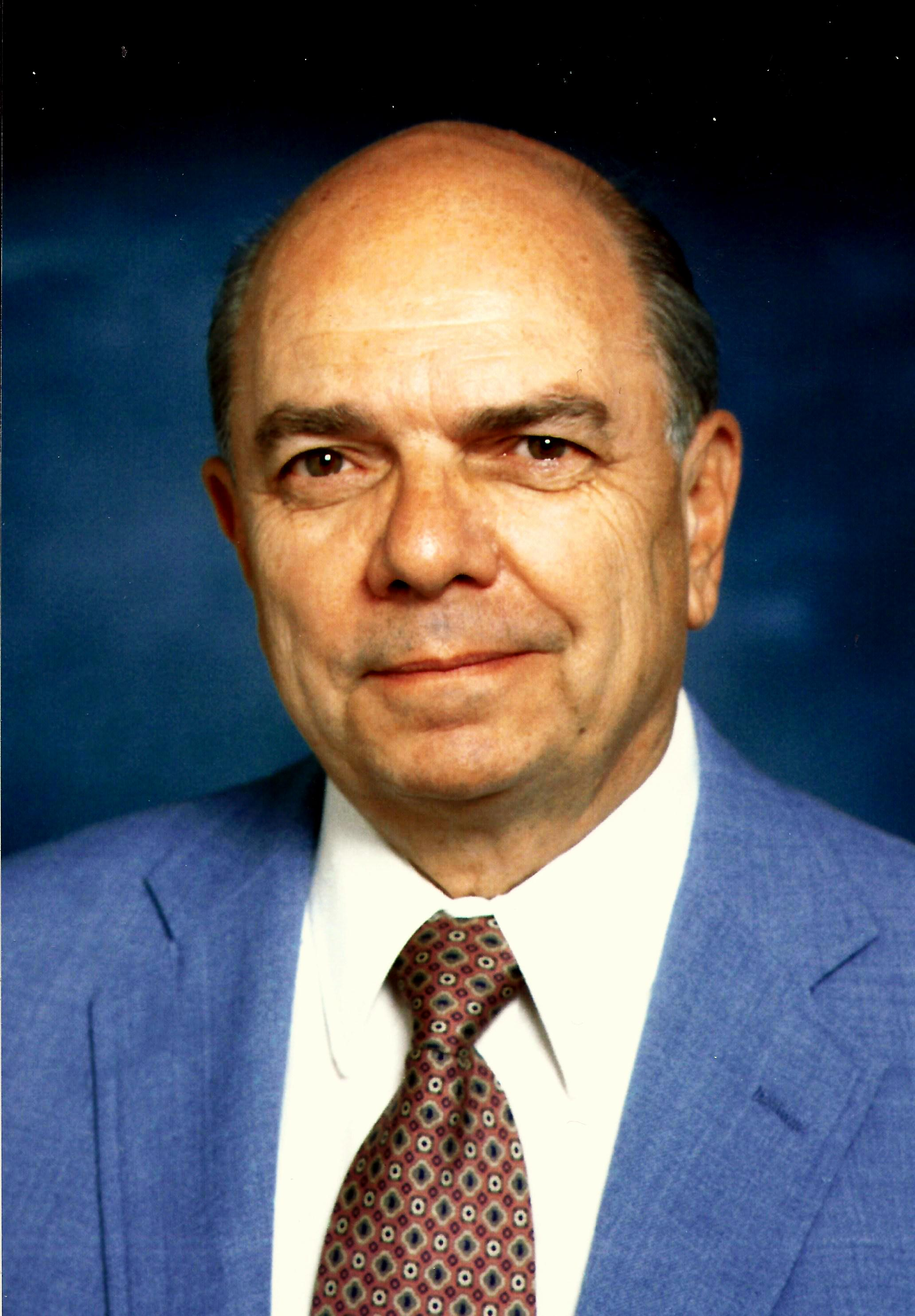
- Born: August 4, 1934; Spokane, Washington, U.S.
- Died: February 15, 2024 (aged 89)
- Education: Massachusetts Institute of Technology, Reed College, Brigham Young University BS/MS, Stanford University PhD, University of Wisconsin Postdoctoral Fellow
- Scientific career
- Fields: Clinical psychology, Psychotherapy Research, Religion and Mental Health
- Institutions: Teachers College, Columbia University, 1961-1972; Brigham Young University, 1972-1999

Allen Eric Bergin (August 4, 1934 – February 15, 2024) was an American clinical psychologist known for his research on psychotherapy outcomes and on integrating psychotherapy and religion. His 1980 article on theistic values was groundbreaking in the field and elicited over 1,000 responses and requests for reprints, and including those from Carl Rogers and Albert Bandura. Bergin is also noted for his interchanges with probabilistic atheist Albert Ellis.

Bergin was raised in a family that did not actively attend any religious services. He went to high school in Spokane, Washington, and began college at Massachusetts Institute of Technology. He then transferred to Reed College. The school had four Latter-day Saints in its student body that year, one of whom was Bergin's roommate and another of whom, Marian Shafer, he began dating. The following year Shafer decided to transfer to Brigham Young University (BYU), and Bergin decided to do the same. Through interactions with BYU professor and Reed alumnus Robert K. Thomas, Bergin learned more about Mormonism and in March 1955 was baptized a member of the Church of Jesus Christ of Latter-day Saints (LDS Church) by Thomas. After this, Bergin married Marian Shafer. He attributes much of his life success and satisfaction to Marian's transcendent influence.

Bergin eventually earned a master's degree from BYU and then a Ph.D. from Stanford University under Albert Bandura, followed by post-doctoral research at the University of Wisconsin under Carl Rogers. He then became a professor in the clinical psychology program at Teachers College, Columbia University. While on the Columbia faculty, Bergin lived in New Jersey and served as a bishop for the LDS church and later as a counselor in the Eastern States Mission Presidency. It was also while at Columbia that Bergin co-edited the Handbook of Psychotherapy and Behavior Change with Sol Garfield; the book was named a social science citation classic.

In 1972 Bergin joined the faculty of BYU in part as a result of the encouragement of Thomas. During his years there, he also served in LDS Church positions as a Bishop, a Stake President, and member of the Church-wide Sunday School General Board. He and his wife, Marian, later served a Church Education Mission at the Lajolla, CA. Institute of Religion for students at the University of California-San Diego.

Bergin served as president of the Society for Psychotherapy Research in 1974–75. He also served as president of the Association of Mormon Counselors and Psychotherapists in 1980. He received the "Distinguished Professional Contribution to Knowledge Award" from the American Psychological Association in 1989, the "Oskar Pfister Award in Religion and Mental Health" from the American Psychiatric Association in 1998, and the "William James Award in the Psychology of Religion" from Division 36 of the American Psychological Association in 1990. He has acknowledged the significant influence of colleagues who have collaborated with him, particularly Sol Garfield, Hans Strupp, Michael Lambert, and Scott Richards.

Eric Swedin wrote, "The American Psychological Association awarded him the prestigious Distinguished Professional Contributions to Knowledge award in 1989, citing him as a 'leading expert in psychotherapy research' and for challenging 'psychological orthodoxy to emphasize the importance of values and religion in therapy.'"

Bergin also has a special place in the history of psychologists and researchers who were members of the LDS Church, who traditionally work hard to harmonize scholarship and religion and to reconcile any differences between the truths discovered in science with the truths they believe to be revealed by God.

Allen and Marian Bergin were the parents of nine children, and had 18 grandchildren and 16 great-grandchildren. He died at home on February 15, 2024, at the age of 89.

== Important publications ==
Bergin, A.E., & Garfield, S.L. (1971). Handbook of psychotherapy and behavior change: An empirical analysis. New York: Wiley.
Bergin, A.E., & Strupp, H.H. (1972). Changing frontiers in the science of psychotherapy. Chicago: Aldine-Atherton.
Garfield, S.L., & Bergin, A.E. (1978). Handbook of psychotherapy and behavior change: An empirical analysis 2nd edition. New York: Wiley.
Bergin, A. E. (1980). Psychotherapy and religious values. Journal of Consulting and Clinical Psychology, 48, 95–105
Garfield, S.L., & Bergin, A.E. (1986). Handbook of psychotherapy and behavior change 3rd edition. New York: Wiley.
Bergin, A.E., & Garfield, S.L. (1994). Handbook of psychotherapy and behavior change 4th edition. New York: Wiley.
Bergin, A.E. (1996)."Life and Testimony of an Academic Clinical Psychologist." In S.E. Black (Ed.) Expressions of Faith. Salt Lake City: Deseret Book, 1996. Richards, P.S., & Bergin, A.E. (1997). A spiritual strategy for counseling and psychotherapy. Washington, DC: American Psychological Association.
Richards, P.S., & Bergin, A.E. (2000). Handbook of psychotherapy and religious diversity. Washington, DC: American Psychological Association.
Bergin, A.E. (2002). Eternal values and personal growth: A guide on your journey to spiritual, emotional, and social wellness. Provo, Utah: BYU Studies. Richards, P.S., & Bergin, A.E. (2004). Casebook for a spiritual strategy in counseling and psychotherapy. Washington, DC: American Psychological Association.
Richards, P.S., & Bergin, A.E. (2005). A spiritual strategy for counseling and psychotherapy 2nd. edition. Washington, DC: American Psychological Association.
Castonguay, L.G., et al. (2010). "Bringing psychotherapy research to life" Wash, DC: American Psychological Assn.
Lambert, M.J. (2004,& 2013). "Bergin and Garfield's Handbook of Psychotherapy and Behavior Change" 5th & 6th editions. Hoboken, NJ: Wiley.
Richards, P.S. & Bergin, A.E. (2014). "Handbook of Psychotherapy and Religious Diversity" 2nd. edition. Washington, DC: American Psychological Association. Sternberg, R.J. (2003). "The Anatomy of Impact: What Makes The Great Works of Psychology Great." American Psychological Assn., 2003. Swedin, E.G. (2003). "Healing souls: Psychotherapy in the Latter-day Saint Community." Urbana: University of Illinois Press.

== Selected speeches ==
- "Psychology and Repentance" – Devotional address given at Brigham Young University on October 10, 1995
