= Timeline of LGBTQ Mormon history in the 1950s =

History of LGBT people and Mormonism in the 1950s

This is a timeline of LGBT Mormon history in the 1950s, part of a series of timelines consisting of events, publications, and speeches about LGBTQ+ individuals, topics around sexual orientation and gender minorities, and the community of members of the Church of Jesus Christ of Latter-day Saints (LDS Church). Although the historical record is often scarce, evidence points to queer individuals having existed in the Mormon community since its beginnings. However, top LDS leaders only started regularly addressing queer topics in public in the late 1950s. Since 1970, the LDS Church has had at least one official publication or speech from a high-ranking leader referencing LGBT topics every year, and a greater number of LGBT Mormon and former Mormon individuals have received media coverage.

== Timeline ==
=== 1952 ===
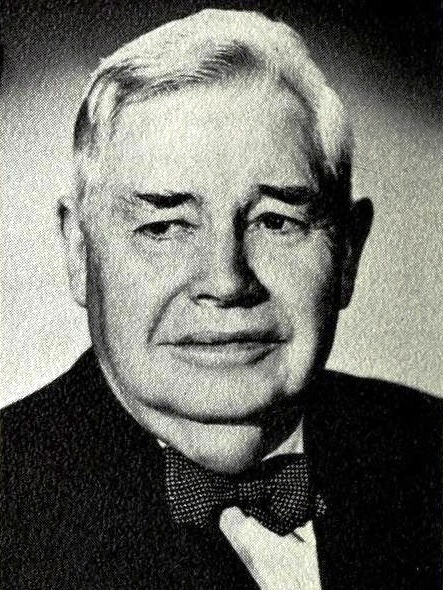
In the 1950s Apostle J. Reuben Clark gave several of the first public speeches by a high-ranking LDS leader to use the term "homosexual."

- October – An increase in US public discourse around homosexuality in the McCarthyist Lavender scare era contributed to the first explicit mention of the term homosexual in general conference. Apostle Clark lamented that homosexuality is found among men and women, and that homosexual people exercise great influence in shaping culture. After this LDS leaders started regularly addressing queer topics in public especially towards the end of the decade.

=== 1954 ===
- May – While administrating as an apostle, Spencer Kimball discussed sexual sins at a BYU address condemning any abhorrent, unmentionable, unnatural, unholy, impure, heinous sexual practices with another person. He further said the belief that God "made me this way, gave me these desires and passions" was untrue, and that we can "overcome and become perfect". The speech was printed as a pamphlet and given to missionaries.
- July – Apostle Harold B. Lee interpreted several scriptures in the Old and New Testament as describing homosexuality as the most abhorred sin in God's sight which justified the destruction of Sodom and Gomorrah.
- October – Apostle Clark again addressed homosexuality in conference when in the October priesthood session he mentions that those guilty of "the filthy crime of homosexuality" are not a part of the "Army of the Lord to fight evil".

=== 1955 ===
- October – A Boise, Idaho, gay witch hunt was launched to hunt down gay men among moral panic over several local arrests of males for same-sex sexual activity. This resulted in nearly 1,500 people questioned, producing hundreds of names of suspected homosexuals including several Mormons. Author John Gerassi cites an oppressive environment engendered by the predominantly LDS population in his seminal 1966 work Boys of Boise as a contributing factor for the illegal sexual activity and subsequent witch hunts. The documentary The Fall of '55 was made about the events in 2006.

=== 1957 ===
- April – Apostle Clark cited Old Testament punishments for sexual sins to highlight that "sex transgression is tragically serious" in the April General Conference. He stated "for homosexuality, it was death to the male and the prescription or penalty for the female I do not know."
- October – The LDS Salt Lake City judge Marcellus Snow stated that he planned to use more jail time (up to six months) for people suspected of homosexual acts in order to prevent them from "proselyting our youth". During a months-long sting operation, male Salt Lake City vice squad undercover agents arrested about 6 men who were accused of making sexual advances in a Salt Lake City theater and tavern widely known as a male homosexual hotspot.

=== 1958 ===
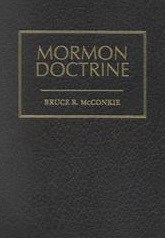
This highly influential publication was the first publicly available book by a general authority to explicitly outline church stances on homosexuality.

- 1958 – General authority Bruce R. McConkie published Mormon Doctrine, in which he states that homosexuality is "among Lucifer's chief means of leading souls to hell". In the section on "Chastity" he states that it is better to be "dead clean, than alive unclean" and that many Mormon parents would rather their child "come back in a pine box with [their] virtue than return alive without it". The book was viewed by many members both then and now as representing official doctrine despite never being endorsed by the church.
- May – LDS police sergeant Theon Southworth over the Salt Lake City anti-vice department announced increased efforts to catch homosexual men. His three officers assigned to patrol known sexual cruising locations officers had arrested 23 men for same-sex sexual activity in the month of May alone. The increased arrests continued and several months later a city judge remarked that several of the men arrested were very prominent members of the community, and The Salt Lake Tribune commended the judge's actions stating "Homosexuality is a social evil that must be fought", but that imprisonment was not the answer as confinement may "spread the 'disease'" to others. The anti-vice squad activities occurred under the direction of LDS influential right-wing author Cleon Skousen who had been appointed as the Salt Lake City police chief in 1956, but was removed in 1960 for overzealousness in his police raiding.
- October – After reports of homosexual activity in the Utah State Prison made Utah headlines in September, the church's newspaper published an interview with a former inmate there who stated that about 25% of the inmates there were participating in homosexual activities. LDS chief deputy county attorney Jay Banks suggested that homosexual inmates be moved into a separate building and that "it would take the warden about a half hour to separate the homos and agitators from the rest of the prisoners".

=== 1959 ===
- 1959 – The apostle Mark E. Petersen was appointed to work with Kimball over instances of homosexuality.
- 1959 – Church leaders begin their electroshock aversion therapy program on BYU campus in an attempt to change the sexual orientation of gay teens and men. The on-campus program lasted over three decades into the mid-90s.
- 1959 – The fictional book Advise and Consent is released featuring the story of a married Mormon US senator named Brigham Anderson from Utah who has an affair with another man. It won a Pulitzer Prize and was later made into a film in 1962. The novel's plot takes place during the ongoing 1950s McCarthyist Lavender Scare era when thousands of lesbian and gay applicants were barred from federal employment as national security threats under President Eisenhower's Executive Order 10450, and over 5,000 federal employees were fired under suspicions of being homosexual.
- January – The church's newspaper published an editorial written by the apostle and Deseret News editor Mark Petersen. It approved the LDS Salt Lake City police chief Cleon Skousen's denouncement of pushes to legalize homosexuality. The punitive attitude towards homosexuality in the editorial was criticized by a psychologist in a later issue's letter to the editor.
- January – LDS chairman of the Utah State Board of Corrections Leslie David Burbridge stated that about 10% of teen boys at the Ogden juvenile reform Utah State Industrial School had had a homosexual experience with 90% of those having occurred before entering the school. LDS superintendent of the school Claud Harmon Pratt stated that in the past seven years there had been under six reported incidents of homosexuality at the school.
- May – In a Salt Lake Temple meeting with senior apostles BYU president Ernest Wilkinson recorded that church president David McKay stated "homosexuality was worse than immorality, that it is a filthy and unnatural habit."
- November – LDS member Dr. Jay S. Broadbent representing Provo in a Utah state meeting on pornography discussed ordinances to curtail explicit pornography including gay pornography being sent through the mail in the state, along with beefcake magazines which were soft-core homoerotic magazines printed under the pretext of promoting fitness, health, and bodybuilding to skirt Comstock obscenity laws, including those reinforced by Roth v. United States in 1957.

== See also ==
- Homosexuality and The Church of Jesus Christ of Latter-day Saints
- Law of adoption (Mormonism)
- LGBT rights in Utah
- LGBT Mormon suicides
- List of Christian denominational positions on homosexuality
- Mormonism in the 20th century
- Sexuality and Mormonism
