= Timeline of LGBTQ Mormon history in the early 20th century =

This is a timeline of LGBT Mormon history in the first half of the 20th century, part of a series of timelines consisting of events, publications, and speeches about LGBTQ+ individuals, topics around sexual orientation and gender minorities, and the community of members of the Church of Jesus Christ of Latter-day Saints (LDS Church). Although the historical record is often scarce, evidence points to queer individuals having existed in the Mormon community since its beginnings. However, top LDS leaders only started regularly addressing queer topics in public in the late 1950s. Since 1970, the LDS Church has had at least one official publication or speech from a high-ranking leader referencing LGBT topics every year, and a greater number of LGBT Mormon and former Mormon individuals have received media coverage.

== Timeline ==
=== 1900s ===
==== 1902 ====
- March – Fourteen-year-old Clyde Felt of a prominent Mormon family cut the throat of Samuel Collins, allegedly as an assisted suicide for blood atonement. Sixty-two-year-old Collins had exhibited hebephilic or ephebophilic pederasty, giving gifts to Felt and two other teenage males with whom he had sex. Felt was cleared of the killing and later married in an LDS temple.

==== 1903 ====
- January – Kate Thomas who never married published a poem with homosexual themes of taking joy from a feminine kiss and using the word 'gay' in the Young Woman's Journal while living in New York City's Greenwich Village where gay was used as slang for homosexual.

==== 1908 ====
- July – Ogden bishopric member and school superintendent Heber H. Thomas received publicity for his involvement in severely beating seven teenage male students after their "revolting affair" of engaging in "monkeying" and "that unmentionable crime" of "buggery" on a campout. Five of the seven teens were LDS-raised. He later resigned as superintendent as a result of a legal investigation.

=== 1910s ===
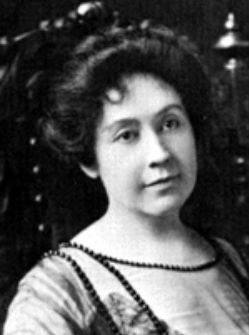
Mormon actress Ada Dwyer Russell was in a relationship with poet Amy Lowell for over a decade until Lowell's death in 1925.

==== 1912 ====
- May – Actress Ada Dwyer Russell of Mormon upbringing entered a lesbian relationship with poet Amy Lowell. The next year it was reported to the First Presidency that her father James Dwyer, the cofounder of what is now the LDS Business College, had been teaching young men that same-sex sexual activity was not a sin. Upon learning this the First Presidency had Dwyer withdraw his name from membership.

=== 1920s ===
==== 1923 ====
- 1923 – Cornelia (Cora) Kasius, a lesbian woman, began working as secretary to the Relief Society general president. She had been a staff member at their headquarters since 1920 and published articles in the Relief Society Magazine in 1925. She was one of the subjects in Berryman's research on Salt Lake City lesbian and gay people, and later moved to the gay hot spot Greenwich Village in New York City.

==== 1926 ====
- November – Mormon-raised young lovers Ruth Drake (23) and Sarah Lundstedt (22) drank cyanide poison together in North Salt Lake City after being pressured by family to end their four-year relationship and move away from each other. Their tragic love story, complete with love letters, made national news. LDS sociologist Dr. Arthur Beeley, a BYU alumnus and professor at the University of Utah, stated in an article about the two women that homosexuality was an abnormal and pitiful condition caused by one having characteristics of the opposite sex and not being attractive to the opposite sex or not being attracted to the opposite sex and filling the want for companionship with someone of the same sex.

==== 1928 ====
- January – LDS-raised, Utah native Sheldon Clark murdered his gay employer Don Solovich with a hammer near Gunnison, Utah, which became a highly publicized criminal trial. Solovich had worked for actors Charlie Chaplin and Lita Grey as a personal assistant. Clark was sentenced to a few years in prison by the Manti, Utah jury.

=== 1930s ===
==== 1935 ====
- Late 1930s – Beginning in 1935, newspapers in the largely LDS Utah cities of Salt Lake and Ogden discussed ways of altering sexuality such as hormone treatment, by educating young children in mixed-sex schools, and by one attempting to wean oneself from same-sex attractions via an opposite-sex romantic relationship. Another article stated that one woman's homosexuality stemmed from a traumatic witnessing of her mother in a painful delivery of a sibling, and that increased divorces and decreasing young marriages contributed to an increase in homosexuality. The article added "it is possible" but, "very difficult to change an adult homosexual into a normal man or woman", and "they must be determined individuals."

==== 1936 ====
- Summer – After graduating from Utah State University, LDS-raised lesbian May Swenson (born 1913, age 22) moved from Logan, Utah to the gay hotspot Greenwich Village in New York City to pursue her dreams of writing. She would go on to become an influential poet. Swenson lived with her partner for 25 years and after decades of writing, died in 1989 at the age of 76.

==== 1937 ====
- June – Grant Weston Rasmussen (1909–1979), who was raised LDS, published a master's thesis at the University of Utah on homosexuality in Utah titled "The Invert Personality". According to the historian Connell O'Donovan the thesis was in large part an autobiography on Grant coming out to himself and others.

==== 1938 ====
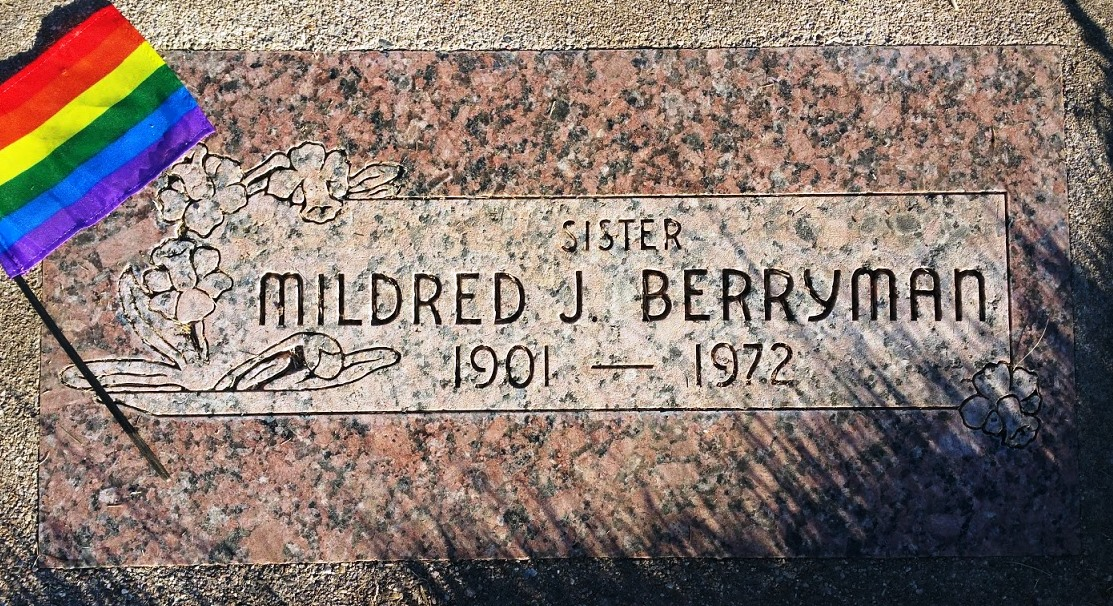
Grave marker for the resting place of lesbian researcher Mildred Berryman who wrote a groundbreaking thesis on Salt Lake City queer community in the 1930s

- November – Mildred Berryman (born 1901) ends working on her groundbreaking thesis The Psychological Phenomena of the Homosexual on 23 lesbian women and 9 gay men, whom she met through the Salt Lake City Bohemian Club. She was a lesbian woman who joined the LDS church at the age of 19, received a patriarchal blessing at the age of 21, and later entered a relationship with a Mormon woman for over three decades. Her study spanned well over a decade, but was only published posthumously by her choice.

=== 1940s ===
==== 1945 ====
- 1945 – The apostle J. Reuben Clark asked church employee Gordon Burt Affleck to organize a surveillance for possible homosexual activity in the steam room of the church's (now-demolished) Deseret Gymnasium at Temple Square. The Church Office Building now occupies the space where the gym was located.

==== 1946 ====
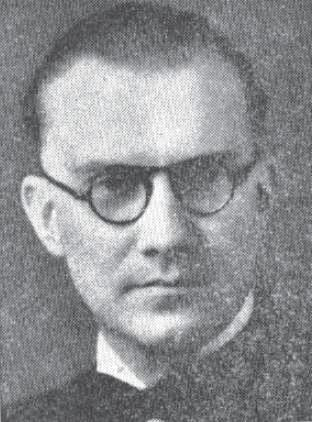
Patriarch Smith was released amidst accusations of homosexual affairs.

- October – Presiding patriarch Joseph Fielding Smith is released on October 6 after serving only four years amid accusations of multiple homosexual affairs, including with University of Utah student Norval Service, a man named Wallace A. G., and later with 21-year-old U.S. Navy sailor Byram Dow Browning who was also a Latter-day Saint.

==== 1947 ====
- January – It appears church leaders were aware of several instances of homosexual behavior by members in Utah since apostle Charles A. Callis had been assigned to these cases before he died in 1947. After Callis's death the apostle Spencer W. Kimball was appointed to preside over homosexual cases.

==== 1948 ====
- 1948 – Radio City Lounge bar opened becoming a major gathering point for Salt Lake LGBTQ community despite occasional raids from local police. Patrons included many gay Mormon men married to women like Bob Sorensen who met his husband there in 1966 after divorcing his wife. The bar closed in 2009, and was considered the oldest gay bar West of the Mississippi.
- April – Gay BYU students Kent Goodridge Taylor and Richard Snow, who were in love, went to visit with church president George Albert Smith, who told them to "live their lives as best they could" in their companionship. Smith wrote the words "Homo Sexual" in his appointment book. Earl Kofoed, who went from BYU from 1946 to 1948, similarly reported a "live and let live" attitude of leaders towards LGBT Mormons, and described a thriving gay community of friends at BYU. He stated that there were no witch hunts, excommunications, or pressure to change one's sexual orientation at BYU like there would be in later decades.

== See also ==
- Homosexuality and The Church of Jesus Christ of Latter-day Saints
- Law of adoption (Mormonism)
- LGBT rights in Utah
- LGBT Mormon suicides
- List of Christian denominational positions on homosexuality
- Mormonism in the 20th century
- Sexuality and Mormonism
