= Timeline of LGBTQ Mormon history in the 1960s =

History of LGBT people and Mormonism in the 1960s

This is a timeline of LGBT Mormon history in the 1960s, part of a series of timelines consisting of events, publications, and speeches about LGBTQ+ individuals, topics around sexual orientation and gender minorities, and the community of members of the Church of Jesus Christ of Latter-day Saints (LDS Church). Although the historical record is often scarce, evidence points to queer individuals having existed in the Mormon community since its beginnings. However, top LDS leaders only started regularly addressing queer topics in public in the late 1950s. Since 1970, the LDS Church has had at least one official publication or speech from a high-ranking leader referencing LGBT topics every year, and a greater number of LGBT Mormon and former Mormon individuals have received media coverage.

== Timeline ==
=== 1960 ===
- March – An editorial in the church newspaper by Mark Petersen blamed pornography (including "pin-up-boy" magazines for homosexuals and pocket-sized books featuring "lesbianism, homosexuality") for a national increase in crime, and called for legislation to censor such smut.
- September – Utah native and LDS-raised R. Joel Dorius (born 1919) would become an unwitting champion of gay liberation after he was arrested in Massachusetts along with two coworkers and fired from his language and visual arts Smith College professorship. His house was raided and beefcake fitness magazines with erotic images of men were found in what is now considered a McCarthyist gay witch hunt. Along with a coworker, Dorius appealed the verdict of pornography possession to the Massachusetts Supreme Judicial Court and all three professors were exonerated as the raid warrants were deemed unconstitutional. The scandal has been dramatized in The Scarlet Professor and the PBS documentary The Great Pink Scare.
- October – The church newspaper printed an article on homosexuality based on a speech from a Salt Lake City psychiatrist. The article said male homosexuality was an illness caused by an absent father and a domineering mother in early adolescence which caused the child to identify more with the female. It added homosexuality could be cured by psychiatric treatment, and prevented by fathers "wear[ing] the pants in the family" and working and playing with their boys.

=== 1961 ===
- September – An editorial in the church newspaper by apostle Mark Petersen used the rape and murder of an 11-year-old girl in American Fork, Utah, to characterize homosexual people as child rapists and "deviates pose[ing] a danger to children on every street in every community". He added, "Molesters, rapists, killers, homosexuals ... are emotionally sick and disabled creatures. ... They are waiting. They are hunting. They are seeking .... The deviates prowl that jungle."

=== 1962 ===
- February – Apostle Lee gave a lengthy anecdote about a woman in love with another woman stating that the ugly practice and unpardonable sin of homosexuality is more common than we realize. He had her promise to never return to homosexuality and pray to become what he termed a normal, natural woman.

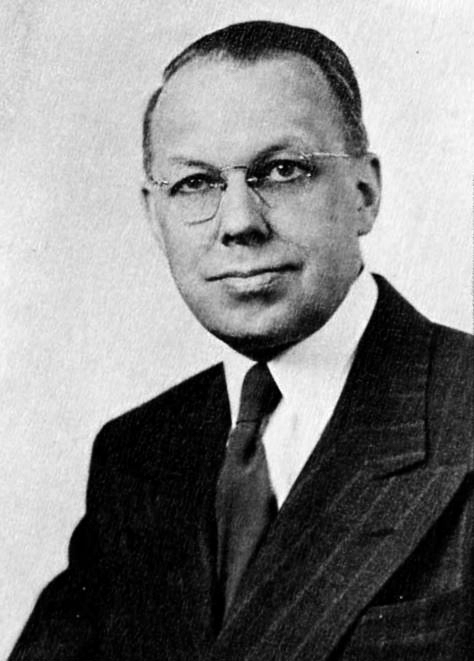
Under BYU president Wilkinson no students were allowed to attend BYU who were known to be attracted to people of the same sex. Additionally, student spying and bishops were encouraged to report students' confidential confessions to the Honor Code Office.

- May – The movie Advise & Consent (based on the book) premiered featuring the story of a married Mormon US senator named Brigham Anderson from Utah who has an affair with another man. It had the first mainstream American film depiction of a gay bar.
- September – Under president Ernest Wilkinson a complete ban of any students attracted to people of the same sex regardless of behavior was instituted at BYU per the directives of apostles Kimball and Petersen. The ban lasted until April 1973. Wilkinson received permission in 1967 to request that BYU bishops report any student whom they suspected was breaking rules or who had confessed to violating BYU conduct codes. This resulted in 72 students suspected of homosexual activity reported to the Standards Office (now called the Honor Code Office) within the first year of the new policy, and many expulsions and suspensions. Security files were kept on suspected gay students and student spying was encouraged.

=== 1964 ===
- July – Apostle Kimball addressed seminary and institute faculty on BYU campus calling homosexuality a "malady", "disease", and an "abominable and detestable crime against nature" that was "curable" by "self mastery". He cited one lay bishop (a businessman by trade) assigned by the church to administer a "program of rehabilitation" through which there had been "numerous cures". He said "the police, the courts, and the judges" had referred "many cases directly" to the church.

=== 1965 ===
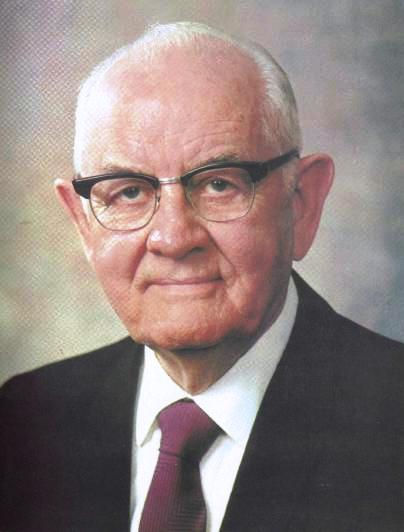
Spencer W. Kimball was assigned as a church specialist on homosexuality in 1947 and shaped church teachings on the subject through numerous speeches and publications in the 1960s and 1970s.

- January – Kimball again addressed homosexuality in a January 5 BYU speech. He called it a "gross", "heinous", "obnoxious", "abominable" "vicious" sin. The text states that those with homosexual "desires and tendencies" could "correct" and "overcome" it "the same as if he had the urge toward petting or fornication or adultery", but that "the cure ... is like the cure for alcoholism, subject to continued vigilance". In the speech he stated BYU "will never knowingly enroll ... nor tolerate ... anyone with these tendencies who fails to repent", and that it is a "damnable heresy" for a homosexual person to say "God made them that way". He also stated that sometimes masturbation is an introduction to homosexuality.
- April – In a churchwide broadcast address the apostle Mark Petersen cited the movements to remove laws banning same-sex sexual activity in at least two US states as great evidence of apostasy, rejecting God, and society placing itself in the role of anti-Christ.
- March – Church president David McKay told his counselors that homosexual people should be dealt with immediately and excommunicated if they are guilty, and that "the homosexual has no right to membership in the church".
- November – Ernest L. Wilkinson, the president of BYU and Commissioner of Church Education, gave an address on September 23 to the BYU student body, stating, "nor do we intend to admit to this campus any homosexuals. ... [I]f any of you have this tendency, ... may I suggest you leave the University immediately .... We do not want others on this campus to be contaminated by your presence." The speech was later published in the church-owned Deseret News.
- December – Kimball wrote a gay male member stating that "homosexual relationships are dead-end" and that the man's partner would leave him if he could "no longer be 'used'".

=== 1966 ===
- May – A letter to the editor was published in the church's newspaper which said, "we are constantly pressured to understand and help murderers, rapists, thieves and now the 'poor, sick, misunderstood homosexual.' ... The believers of the Bible know what the Bible has to say of homosexuals, and that it states the penalty is death for this act. ... This is degeneration which we must not condone, legalize, or 'learn to live with.'"
- August – An editorial in the church's newspaper noted that "Legislatures are beginning to relax moral laws relating not only to adulterous relationships but also to homosexuality and prostitution." The article asked, "What is wrong with a lawmaker who condones homosexuality? ... And what is wrong with citizens who elect such lawmakers?"
- October – Milton R. Hunter lamented that "attitudes toward homosexuality have been liberalized in England" and that many US leaders were "clamoring for a liberal attitude in our land" in a General Conference address.
- October – Patriarch of the church Eldred G. Smith cited "a campaign ... launched to bring acceptance to homosexuality" as one example of "corruption" and "conditions at home" manifesting the "cycle of ... unrighteousness and wickedness" that lead to "wars and destruction" like the current "war in Viet Nam" in a General Conference speech.

=== 1967 ===
- October – The church's newspaper published an editorial which stated if a mother over-indulges her son he may turn against parenthood and women, and this rebellion drove one son into a homosexual life.

=== 1968 ===
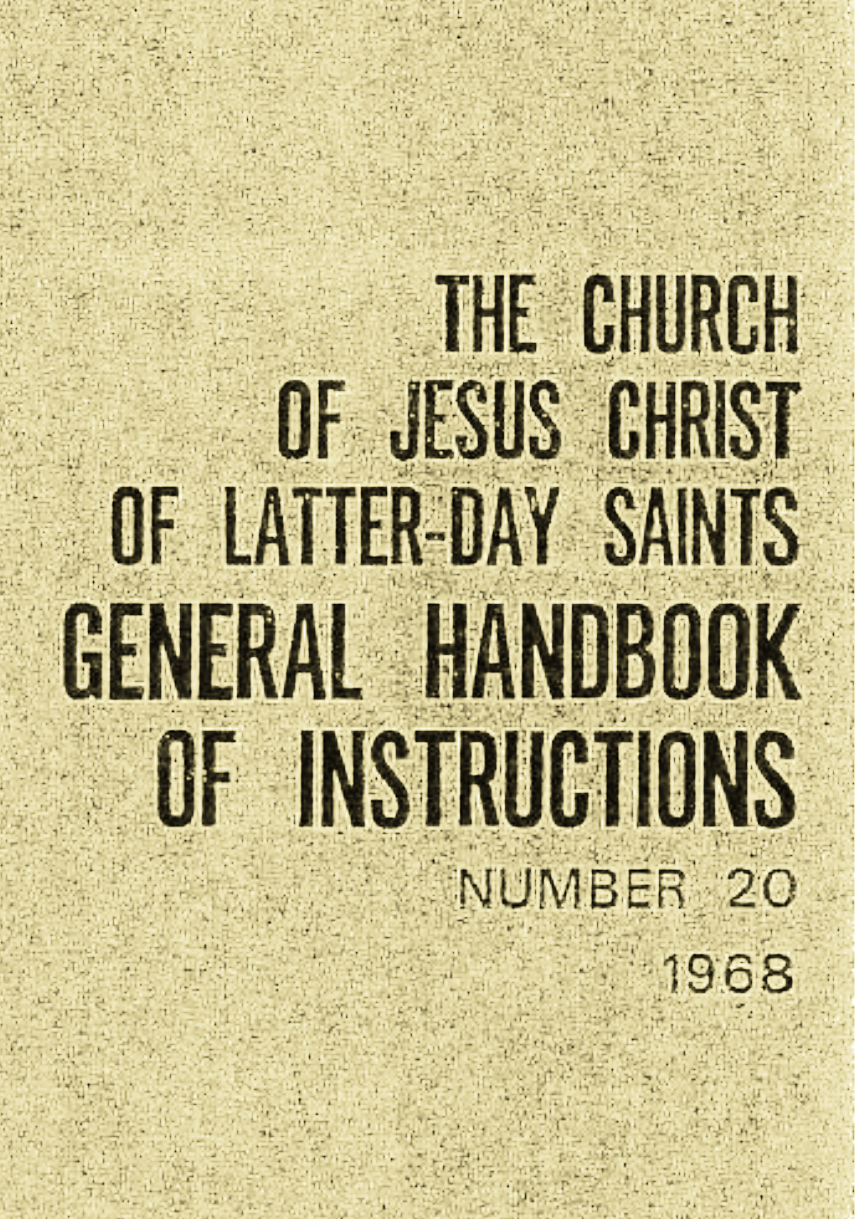
The 1968 leader handbook was the first release to explicitly mention homosexuality.

- 1968 – A version of the Church Handbook was released containing the first explicit mention of homosexuality. It specifies that "homo-sexual acts" require a church court.
- March – The Deseret News published an editorial which stated a distressing sign of breakdown in American morals was a recent report of many Episcopalian priests saying homosexuality was not immoral.

=== 1969 ===
- 1969 – The United Order Family of Christ, a young gay male Mormon commune was founded which practiced a uniquely Mormon form of communalism called the United Order.

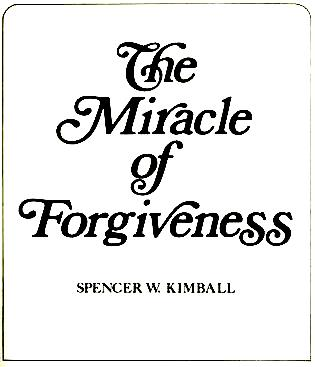
Kimball's influential book taught that homosexuality was curable and was officially recommended as a resource for homosexual members into the 1990s.

- 1969 – Kimball released his book The Miracle of Forgiveness, in which he teaches that masturbation can lead to acts of homosexuality. His book was quoted in a 1979 church manual: "the glorious thing to remember is that [homosexuality] is curable .... Certainly it can be overcome .... How can you say the door cannot be opened until your knuckles are bloody, till your head is bruised, till your muscles are sore?" Kimball viewed many homosexuals as "basically good people who have become trapped in sin" and that "some totally conquer homosexuality in a few months." However, he also says that homosexual behavior can lead to sex with animals.
- April – Apostle Harold B. Lee stated that homosexuality is a prostitution of love and the ugliest relationship that we know.
- April – Mark E. Petersen cites how homosexuality "was made a capital crime in the Bible" as evidence of the seriousness of sexual sin in a general conference address. He states "immorality is next to murder" and "the wage of sin is death" and that a rejection of morality "may bring about [this nation's] fall" as with "Greece and Rome" unless there was repentance.
- October – An article in the church's newspaper quoted one school superintendent stating, "All-boy school or all-girl schools tend to reinforce a deviant way of life ... and homosexual behavior is likely to result."

== See also ==
- Homosexuality and The Church of Jesus Christ of Latter-day Saints
- Law of adoption (Mormonism)
- LGBT rights in Utah
- LGBT Mormon suicides
- List of Christian denominational positions on homosexuality
- Mormonism in the 20th century
- Sexuality and Mormonism
