= Timeline of LGBTQ Mormon history =

Below is a series of timelines of LGBTQ Mormon history consisting of events, publications, and speeches about LGBTQ individuals, topics around sexual orientation and gender minorities, and the community of members of Mormonism's largest denomination, the Church of Jesus Christ of Latter-day Saints (LDS Church). Although the historical record is often scarce, evidence points to queer individuals having existed in the Mormon community since its beginnings, and to leaders being against same-sex sexual behavior and gender non-conformity. LDS leadership started to more regularly address topics regarding the LGBTQ community in public in the late 1950s. Since 1970, the LDS Church has had at least one official publication or speech from a high-ranking leader referencing LGBTQ topics every year, and a greater number of LGBTQ Mormon and former Mormon individuals have received media coverage.

The timeline is divided into the following parts for readability, with each part linked below:

- LGBTQ Mormon history in the 1800s
- LGBTQ Mormon history from 1900 to the 1940s
- LGBTQ Mormon history in the 1950s
- LGBTQ Mormon history in the 1960s
- LGBTQ Mormon history in the 1970s
- LGBTQ Mormon history in the 1980s
- LGBTQ Mormon history in the 1990s
- LGBTQ Mormon history in the 2000s
- LGBTQ Mormon history in the 2010s
- LGBTQ Mormon history in the 2020s

== See also ==
- Homosexuality and the LDS Church
- Law of adoption (Mormonism)
- LGBTQ rights in Utah
- LGBTQ Mormon suicides
- List of Christian denominational positions on homosexuality
- Mormonism in the 19th century
- Mormonism in the 20th century
- Mormonism in the 21st century
- Sexuality and Mormonism
- Utah Constitutional Amendment 3
