= Gender minorities and the LDS Church =

Transgender and intersex people and Mormonism

Transgender people and other gender minorities currently face restrictions in membership, and in access to priesthood and temple rites in the Church of Jesus Christ of Latter-day Saints (LDS Church)—Mormonism's largest denomination. All transgender people, even those who have only socially transitioned without gender-affirming surgery, are ineligible to join the LDS Church via baptism as of 2024. In 2020 the church issued guidelines for persons born intersex stating the decision to determine a child's sex is left to the parents, with the guidance of medical professionals, and that such decisions can be made at birth or can be delayed until medically necessary. Prior to 2020, the LDS Church had no publicly available policy or statements on intersex persons.

In the past the church taught that homosexuality was caused by gender nonconformity or confusion about gender roles. Only recently have top LDS leaders begun directly addressing gender diversity and the experiences of transgender, non-binary, intersex, and other gender minority people whose gender identity, gender expression, and/or sex characteristics differ from the cisgender (i.e. non-transgender) and endosex (i.e. non-intersex) majority. Trans and intersex members of the LDS Church have received greater reporting in media, and church teachings and policies have received criticism.

The transgender flag

== Background ==
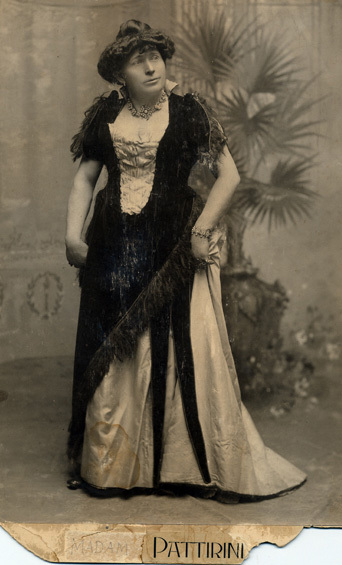
Brigham Morris Young, son of Brigham Young, performing as Madam Pattirini c. 1901

Gender identity and roles play an important part in Mormon theology which teaches a strict binary of spiritual gender as literal offspring of heterosexual, cisgender Heavenly Parents. Part of Sunday church meetings are currently divided by biological sex, and for most of the 1800s church presidents Joseph Smith and Brigham Young had men, women, and children sit separately for all Sunday meetings. Studies that shape current psychological understanding of expressions and identities for sexuality and gender show strong evidence that gender and sexuality are "separate, but related" aspects of a person and stem from similar biological origins. Church leaders first mentioned "transsexual" people in their official policy book in 1980.

In the past leaders taught that in the premortal life individuals chose whether to live as male or female during mortality, and that poor choices during their time on earth could demote them back to a genderless condition. For example, church president Joseph Fielding Smith, stated that those who did not reach the celestial kingdom in the afterlife would be "neither man nor woman, merely immortal beings".

== Teachings on transgender individuals ==
Current teachings on gender identity include an official church website on homosexuality which states that "same-sex attraction and gender dysphoria are very different ... those who experience gender dysphoria may or may not also experience same-sex attraction, and the majority of those who experience same-sex attraction do not desire to change their gender. From a psychological and ministerial perspective, the two are different." Other notable teachings on gender have included an official statement made in 1995 by the LDS Church's First Presidency and Quorum of the Twelve Apostles which states that "gender is an essential characteristic of individual pre-mortal, mortal, and eternal identity and purpose".

LDS Church leaders have stated that they have unfinished business in teaching on the difficult and sensitive topic of transgender individuals. Church spokesman Eric Hawkins stated in March 2016 that LDS bishops recognize that "each case is different" and "difficult and sensitive" and that they recognize the "emotional pain" many gender minorities feel. He also reaffirmed the church's views that "gender is part of our eternal God-given identity and purpose" and stated that the church does not baptize "those who are planning trans-sexual [sic] operations" and that undergoing a "trans-sexual [sic] operation" may imperil the membership of a church member, which seems to include gender-affirming surgery like chest surgery (i.e. top surgery). Transgender members will receive an annotation on their membership record which groups them with violent sexual predators and child abusers, and bars them from working with children or teaching church classes.

Before 2024, transgender baptismal candidates were allowed to join the LDS Church if they had not surgically transitioned. As of 2024, even if transgender individuals have only transitioned socially, they are not allowed to be baptized. Subsequent rituals (called ordinances) such as receiving the priesthood and temple endowments, however, are only done according to birth sex. Members that gender express through clothing or a pronoun change differing from their sex assigned at birth will receive membership restrictions and a notation on their membership records. All people are allowed to attend church meetings, but transgender people are barred from using church facility bathrooms except single-user ones, or if a "trusted person" ensures "others are not using the restroom at the same time." This bathroom policy was criticized by one transgender member Laurie Lee Hall as "dehumanizing" and "implies that a trans member is somehow a danger to others".

Many conservative groups within Mormonism have disagreed with the Church's more accepting stance on transgender people who don't transition, viewing it (and LGBTQ rights in general) as a threat to the traditional family unit. The Mormon-affiliated Deseret Nation (#DezNat) community on Twitter, while praised by conservative members of the church, has been criticized as inciting violence against transgender individuals and the broader LGBTQ community, ex-Mormon people deemed apostates (in relation to teachings of blood atonement), and pornographic film actors.

=== Criticism ===
A study at the church's largest university, Brigham Young University (BYU), concluded that due to the explicit discouragement of social and surgical transitioning, it is difficult for trans people to feel seen, valid, or safe even if they want to attend meetings and adhere to church teachings. Laurie Lee Hall stated that church policies are built on a false premise equating gender and sex at birth, and give no place for trans members like her. Aria Bauman criticized her local church leaders as being exclusionary for banning her from attending church meetings in a dress. Author Charlotte Scholl Shurtz stated that the focus on God as a cisgender, heterosexual couple excludes transgender, nonbinary, and intersex members and enshrines cisnormativity. She further said that current teachings ignore transgender and intersex people and deny exaltation and godhood to non-cisgender individuals. A non-binary BYU graduate was sexually assaulted as a student by their BYU teaching assistant, but did not report it in part because of fear of how the church-run BYU Honor Code office is perceived to surveil and distrust non-cisgender students, as well as assault victims.

== Gender diverse Mormons and former Mormons ==
While the exact portion of LDS Church-goers who identify as something other than cisgender is unknown, a large 2021 survey of BYU students found that .7% noted their gender identity as transgender or something other than cisgender male or female. Over 98% of BYU students are church members. For nationwide comparison, a 2017 meta-analysis of 20 separate large surveys (with sample sizes ranging from over 30,000 US adults to over 165,000 each) found a conservative estimate of .39% for the portion of US adults who self-identify as transgender.

Several transgender and other gender diverse individuals with Mormon background have received media attention. These include:

- Aria and Jack Bauman
- Emmett Claren
- Laurie Lee Hall
- Eri Hayward
- Annabel Jensen
- Alison Kluzek
- Grayson Moore,
- Ann Pack,
- Misty Snow
- Sara Jade Woodhouse

Others who have shared some of their experiences include Kimberly Anderson, Alex Autry, Augustus Crosby, and London Flynn as well as former and current BYU students, Jami Claire, Kris Irvin, Cammie Vanderveur, and Andy Winder. In 2018, a panel of LGBTQ+ BYU students, including transgender man Gabriel Cano, held a campus panel with over 600 students in attendance. They discussed faith, queer identity, and mistreatment by the university's Honor Code Office.

Kris Irvin was a transgender Latter-Day Saint known for online and local community-building efforts. They wrote openly about ups and downs with their faith, gender identity, and experiences with parenting. They died on January 23, 2022, at age 35.

=== Suicide ===
In society at large, LGBTQ individuals, especially youth, are at a higher risk of depression, anxiety, and suicide. A key factor in determining mental health wellbeing is family acceptance and support, and feelings of isolation and rejection are correlated with suicidality. Studies show transgender and other gender diverse (TGD) individuals tend to have much better outcomes when their family members are affirming.

Some transgender LDS individuals have reported their experience with suicidal ideation during their involvement with the LDS Church. Former stake president and church architect Laurie Lee Hall was excommunicated by her Utah local leaders in June 2017 for socially transitioning to express her gender identity as a transgender woman. She had experienced years of suicidal ideation and gender dysphoria before being released as a stake president in 2012 due to her identity and had come out to her entire congregation a year prior to her excommunication in July 2016. Alison Kluzek reported that she was suicidal during a time after coming out to her LDS parents as a trans woman while they initially refused her request to begin transitioning by hormone therapy. She felt that they would either have a dead son or a new daughter. Transgender individuals are permitted to use hormone replacement therapy (HRT) to "ease gender dysphoria or reduce suicidal thoughts". If they are "not attempting to transition to the opposite gender" they may still hold callings (assigned church responsibilities), temple recommends, and have the ability to do ordinances.

=== Organizations ===
Organizations that support Mormon gender diverse individuals include Affirmation: LGBTQ Mormons, Families, & Friends (commonly shortened to Affirmation) and Lift + Love. Understanding Sexuality, Gender, and Allyship (USGA) and The OUT Foundation support gender diverse BYU students.

=== Gender in Mormonism in the 1800s ===
One of the first documented instances of a gender-non-conforming church member was in 1858 when travelling bishop and later church historian A. Milton Musser wrote that Salt Lake City member Almerin Grow had demonstrated odd behavior and was wearing his wife's clothing. Church president Brigham Young subsequently sent him south to "never return", so Grow appointed Musser as guardian of his daughter. Another instance of gender non-conforming dress occurred in the 1880s when then apostle (and later church president) Wilford Woodruff wore a dress and sunbonnet as a disguise while hiding in southern Utah from law enforcement over his outlawed polygamous marriages.

B. Morris Young, a founder of the church Young Men's program and a son of church president Young, began performing in drag as a Vaudeville female impersonator Madam Pattirini. He sang opera in falsetto throughout Utah into the early 1900s, and his gender-non-conforming act was well-received at church social events. Historical evidence does not point to Young being a sexual or gender minority.

== Teachings on intersex individuals ==
Intersex flag

In February 2020 the LDS Church issued a new General Handbook of policies, which included a section on individuals born intersex. The new policies and guidelines noted that for persons born intersex, the decision to determine a child's sex is left to the parents, with the guidance of medical professionals, and that such decisions can be made at birth or can be delayed until medically necessary.

Prior to the 2020 changes in church policy and guidelines, the LDS Church had no publicly available policy or statements on intersex persons. The only publicly available policies were around binary transgender persons who were accepted in the church and could be baptized, but could not receive the priesthood or enter the temple if they were considering or had undergone elective sex reassignment surgery with no mention of those who were born with physically ambiguous or biosex-non-conforming physical traits and features, or for non-binary, agender, or genderqueer individuals who did not undergo surgery.

=== Criticism ===
Previously, author Duane Jeffery criticized LDS teachings around intersex individuals as falling short on including real-world biological complexity. He estimated there were hundreds of intersex church members based on conservative estimates of global population rates. Kimberly Anderson, an LDS intersex person, stated that the existence of intersex people shatters the church's gender-binary hierarchy and plan of salvation. LDS urologist Dr. David Hatch stated that if top church leaders say gender is permanent and eternal then they can't include intersex people which creates a conflict.

== Other teachings on gender ==
Church leaders and scholars have made a number of statements regarding gender. For instance, the apostle David A. Bednar has stated that gender defines much of who we are, why we're on earth, and what we do and become since god made male and female spirits different as part of a divine plan. Another apostle, Russell Ballard taught that the mortal natures of men and women were specified by God. Additionally, apostle Harold B. Lee taught that the "so-called 'transsexuality' doctrine" was hellish and false since God didn't place female spirits in male bodies and vice versa. Church president Spencer W. Kimball addressed the BYU student body in 1974 and stated that sex reassignment surgeries were an appalling travesty.

Members outside of top leaders have also discussed gender. Scholars at the church-owned BYU created a book on the Family Proclamation discussing Mormon views on eternal gender distinctions. In contribution to a work on the Family Proclamation, Robert Millet wrote going against church-taught gender roles would cause unhappiness and a lack of fulfillment before and after death.

=== Past teachings on relationship to homosexuality ===
Current church stances on gender identity and expression and sexual orientation are that they are different and that there is "unfinished business in teaching on [transgender situations]". The official website on homosexuality states that "same-sex attraction and gender dysphoria are very different ... those who experience gender dysphoria may or may not also experience same-sex attraction, and the majority of those who experience same-sex attraction do not desire to [socially or surgically transition]. From a psychological and ministerial perspective, the two are different."

In the past the church taught that homosexuality was caused by gender non-conformity or confusion about gender roles, and the vast majority of allusions to gender minorities were made from the perspective of discussing the etiology and mutability of minority sexual orientations rather than non-cisgender gender identities and expression per se. On several occasions while discussing homosexuality, church leaders have alluded to their belief that the homosexual individual may be confused about their gender identity or gender roles. Examples of this include the following:

- 1971 – Presiding Bishop Victor L. Brown stated in general conference, "men should look and act like men and that women should look and act like women. When these differences are ignored, an unwholesome relationship develops, which, if not checked, can lead to the reprehensible, tragic sin of homosexuality."
- 1973 – A guide for bishops and stake presidents titled "Homosexuality: Welfare Services Packet 1" stated that homosexuality was related to gender confusion and that the man or woman must learn proper behavior for their respective sex.
- 1976 – A general conference address by apostle Boyd K. Packer stated that gay attractions are not inborn or permanent since "there is no mismatching of bodies and spirits" and boys are meant to be "masculine, manly men". The speech was later printed in a widely distributed pamphlet from 1980 to 2016.
- 1978 – The apostle Packer further stated that same-sex sexual behavior is often rooted in the desires of an insecure woman or man to try to become more feminine or masculine respectively.
- 1981 – In the April general conference, church seventy Hartman Rector Jr. stated that homosexual people were not born that way because "[t]here are no female spirits trapped in male bodies and vice versa."
- 1981 – A church guide for LDS Social Services employees instructed that "the homosexually oriented man ... does not fully understand how a masculine man is supposed to think and act."
- 1993 – Packer gave his May 18 "Talk to the All-Church Coordinating Council" (composed of the First Presidency, the Quorum of the Twelve, and the Presiding Bishopric) in which he stated that a man who self-identifies as a homosexual has "gender disorientation".
- 1995 – The church's Family Services manual advised practitioners that "in the homosexual male this core gender identity has become confused".
- 2006 – The apostle Jeffrey R. Holland was interviewed by PBS in March during which he used the phrase "struggling with gender identity" and "gender confusion" as synonyms for homosexuality.
- 2006 – In an interview, Lance B. Wickman of the Seventy used the term "gender orientation" five times as a synonym for "sexual orientation".

== See also ==
- Timeline of LGBTQ Mormon history
- Homosexuality and the LDS Church
- LGBTQ Mormon suicides
- Transgender people and religion
- Christianity and transgender people
- Gender and religion
- Complementarianism
