= LGBTQ Mormon suicides =

Suicide among LGBTQ Mormons

In society at large, LGBTQ individuals, especially youth, are at a higher risk of depression, anxiety, and suicide. Though causes of mental health risk are complex, one often cited reason for these higher risks is minority stress stemming from societal anti-LGBTQ biases and stigma, rejection, and internalized homophobia.

A 2016 empirical study by Benjamin Knoll found indirect data such as a U.S. state's suicide rates and the state's percentage of members of Mormonism's largest denomination, the Church of Jesus Christ of Latter-day Saints (LDS Church), supported anecdotal data that this was because to the church's stance on same-sex sexual relations. Due to the data's limitations the study could not examine what percentages of the deaths were LGBTQ persons or the percentage that were Latter-day Saints. A 2019 study found that gay and bisexual men raised in the LDS Church who remained affiliated had lower life satisfaction and higher risk of suicidality than LDS-raised gay and bisexual men who had disaffiliated. It also found for sexual minorities of all genders that discontinuing involvement with the LDS Church was correlated with better mental health and less internalized anti-gay biases.

A 2002 research report found a negative correlation in suicide between general LDS Church youth members and nonmember youth in Utah, finding higher levels of religiosity appear to be inversely associated with suicide. The study did not take into account sexual orientation or gender identity and expression, and a different study found that while higher religiosity was correlated with lower rates of suicide attempts for heterosexual youth, it had the opposite affect for youth reporting homosexual feelings and increased suicidality, and the same pattern held true for reported parental religiosity. In a 2015 survey of 92 LGBTQ BYU students done by USGA, over half had at some point considered self-harm.

Other studies have shown that LGBTQ Mormons and former Mormons experience higher rates of certain mental health disorders such as PTSD, major depressive disorder, and generalized anxiety disorder than the general population. These are positively correlated with suicidality. One snowball sampling study of 1,612 LGBTQ Mormon and former Mormon respondents in 2015 found that involvement with the LDS Church and being single and celibate or engaging in a mixed-orientation marriage are both associated with higher rates of depression and a lower quality of life for LGBTQ individuals.

Many have stated the belief that LDS teachings on homosexuality and gender, such as the belief that gender and sexuality cannot be changed, have contributed to the suicides of LGBTQ members, and enabled harsh behavior by its members. In January 2016 the LDS Church stated in regards to reported suicides of LGBTQ Mormons that leaders and members are taught to "reach out in an active, caring way to all, especially to youth who feel estranged or isolated." Affirmation, the largest and oldest continuously run LGBTQ Mormon organization, reported over 30 LGBTQ LDS deaths by suicide between 1971 and 2008 including five gay male Brigham Young University (BYU) students who died by suicide in 1965.

== Research ==
Suicidality among the general LGBTQ population in the United States (US) is an area of ongoing research. The US Department of Health and Human Services found in 1989 that nearly 1 of 3 adolescent suicides in the US were by lesbian and gay teens. Another 2001 study found that homosexual teens were 2.5 times more likely to attempt suicide than their heterosexual peers with suggestions that higher rates of depression, victimization by bullies, and alcohol use to numb anxiety from hiding ones stigmatized sexual orientation may be causative factors. Teen suicide rates in the US and Utah (a state with a large LDS population) have increased over the past decade. Among Utah youth aged 10–17 who died by suicide during 2011–2015 with circumstances data, 45% (48 of 146) were LDS affiliated. Of the 40 cases that included information on the decedent's sexual orientation, six (15.0%) were identified as sexual minorities.

Various research surveys have found a range of correlations in the intersection of suicidality and involvement with the LDS Church. Studies have shown that LGBTQ Latter-day Saints and LGBTQ former Latter-day Saints experience higher rates of certain mental health disorders such as PTSD and major depressive disorder than the general population, and these are positively correlated with suicidality. One study of 1,612 LGBTQ Latter-day Saint and former Latter-day Saint respondents in 2015 found that involvement with the LDS Church and being single and celibate or engaging in a mixed-orientation marriage are both associated with higher rates of depression and a lower quality of life for LGBTQ individuals. Depression has been shown to have a strong positive correlation with suicidal intent. Clinically significant symptoms of complex post-traumatic stress disorder related to their experiences within Mormonism have also been observed at high rates among affiliated and disaffiliated LGBTQ Latter-day Saints, and PTSD is associated with suicide attempts and ideation.

A large representative sample of Utah middle and high school students shows higher rates of suicide for LGBTQ youth, which was higher for non-LDS LGBTQ youth when compared to LDS LGBTQ youth. An analysis by the church's largest university, Brigham Young University (BYU), of data from the 2019 Utah Department of Human Services survey of Utah students (6th to 12th grade) found that "religious affiliation was unrelated to suicidality and depression for LGBQ youths once other factors (e.g., family, drug use) were taken into account." For both non-LDS and LDS Utah youth, higher levels of family conflict and lower levels of parental closeness were related to increased reports of depression, substance use, self-harm, suicidal ideation and attempts.

A key factor in determining mental health wellbeing is family acceptance and support, and feelings of isolation and rejection are correlated with suicidality. Studies show LDS transgender and other gender diverse (TGD) individuals tend to have much better outcomes when their family members are affirming.

== Teachings on sexuality and gender identity origins and purported changeability ==
A number of individuals and organizations have stated their belief that church teachings against homosexuality and the treatment of LGBTQ Mormons by other members and leaders has contributed to LGBTQ Mormon suicides. For example, LDS historian Gregory Prince stated that by condemning homosexuality as "evil, self-inflicted, and impossible in postmortal existence" LDS church leaders have enabled harsh behavior by its members with the alarming number of LDS LGBTQ unhoused people and Utah's highest per capita teen suicide rate in the country manifesting the effects of this cruelty. A prominent openly gay member Mitch Mayne wrote in 2012 that his LDS mother told him it would have been better for her if he had been born dead (i.e. stillborn) rather than live and grow up and be gay.

In the late 1990s psychiatrist Jeffery R. Jensen directed his presentations' comments to church leaders and LDS Family Services stating that "far too many of our lesbian and gay youths kill themselves because of what you say about them," and "those who believe your false promises and remain celibate in the hopes of eventual 'cure' are consigned to a misery." Soon after, the American Psychiatric Association disavowed therapy trying to change sexual orientation as ineffective and destructive, and current publications find that these efforts can be very harmful.

=== Sexual orientation or gender identity conversion efforts ===
Church leaders taught for decades that members could and should try to "turn off" gay attractions through methods such as personal righteousness. There is no reliable evidence that such practices can alter sexual orientation or gender identity, and many medical institutions warn that sexual orientation change efforts are ineffective and potentially harmful. A 2015 survey of 1,612 LGBTQ Mormons and former Mormons found that 73% of men and 43% of women had attempted sexual orientation change, usually through multiple methods across many years.

According to a 2020 survey of over 30,000 teen and young adult LGBTQ individuals, LGBTQ youth who have undergone sexual orientation or gender identity conversion efforts (SOGICE) are more than twice as likely to report having attempted suicide and more than 2.5 times as likely to report multiple suicide attempts in the past year. The study also found that greater levels of family religiosity are associated with increased attempts at SOGICE, and three-fourths of respondents who had undergone SOGICE reported parents using religion to say negative things about being LGBTQ. Another study of 245 LGBTQ young adults found those who reported both parent-initiated and formal attempts (e.g., by church clergy) to convince them to change were 5 times more likely to report suicide attempts than those who reported no change attempts or conversion efforts.

==== Responses ====
Apostle Todd Christofferson's gay brother Tom stated that he was "quite surprised" that he was still gay after serving his mission, having believed church teachings that, through righteous effort, God would remove same-sex attraction. Former bishop Robert Rees stated in 2016 that he counseled many gay members who followed church leaders' promises about changing their sexual orientation via missions, temple attendance, and scripture reading. When change didn't come, they often blamed themselves for not being righteous enough, which led to many attempted and successful suicides. LDS author Carol Lynn Pearson, whose husband came out as gay many years into their marriage, stated that, "to me it is clear that many suicides among young Mormon homosexuals, as well as gay people in other religions, can be traced directly to a hostile social and religious environment." One of the Evergreen International's first board members and stake presidency member Russ Baker-Gorringe became severely depressed when his continued efforts to change his attractions failed, resulting in a 1999 suicide attempt only prevented by his daughter.

==== Changes in teachings on change efforts ====
LDS church leaders explicitly promoted therapy attempts to change sexual orientation in the past, but have recently shifted away from those views. A church leader did not take a position on conversion therapy when asked in 2006. Church leaders began explicitly stating that same-sex physical attraction was not a choice in 2012 and that therapy attempting to change sexual orientation was unethical in 2016. In 2019, the church's tacit endorsement of conversion therapy was announced as overturned when a spokesperson for the church stated, "We are opposed to conversion therapy and our therapists do not practice it."

== Church leader teachings on suicide ==
Church teachings on suicide have changed through the years. One of the earliest recorded explicit mentions by a top church leader was by George Q. Cannon in the First Presidency who stated in an 1893 editorial to LDS youth that, "Every member of the Church should be made to understand that it is a dreadful sin to take one's own life. It is self-murder ..." He echoed this, stating, "They who do so are guilty of murder, self-murder it is true ... no one can destroy so precious a gift as that of life without incurring a severe penalty." Cannon recorded that the First Presidency decided those who died by suicide would not receive an honorable burial in their LDS temple robes as was customary for endowed members.

In 1987, the apostle M. Russell Ballard also stated that those who die by suicide have "committed a very serious sin, and some consequences of it may remain with them throughout eternity." Church seventy Bruce R. McConkie wrote in his highly influential LDS bestseller Mormon Doctrine that "Suicide is murder, pure and simple, and murderers are damned." In the 2011 LDS Beliefs: A Doctrinal Reference published by the church, the section on suicide called it "self-murder" and stated that, "modern prophets and apostles have likewise spoken clearly about the seriousness of murder, including self-murder and the severity of consequences associated therewith."

The LDS Church released a statement through spokesman Dale Jones on 28 January 2016 mourning the reported suicides of 32 LGBTQ Mormons. The release stated that leaders and members are taught to "reach out in an active, caring way to all, especially to youth who feel estranged or isolated." On 9 February 2016 when apostle Dallin H. Oaks was asked about church leaders' and members' responsibility for the treatment of LGBTQ individuals that may have precipitated in suicides, he stated, "that's a question that will be answered on Judgment Day" and that "nobody is sadder about a case like that than I am."

== Church suicide prevention efforts ==
In June 2016, the church published its official Mental Health website followed shortly in September 2016 by its official Preventing Suicide website. In August 2017, the LDS Church supported the LoveLoud Festival, a concert event at Utah Valley University raising money for charities which support LGBTQ youth. In April 2018, the LDS Church donated $150,000 to the state of Utah to aid in suicide prevention. In July 2018, the LDS Church donated $25,000 to the LGBTQ advocacy group Affirmation: LGBTQ Mormons, Families & Friends to aid in worldwide suicide prevention training.

== Publicized instances of suicide ==
Below are a few media-reported, completed suicides of LGBTQ individuals from Mormon backgrounds, with the year of death noted in parentheses.

- Carlyle Marsden (1976) — BYU music professor Marsden died by suicide two days after being outed by an arrest for alleged homosexual activity.
- Unnamed (1980s) — A gay BYU student died by suicide a few months into a mixed-orientation temple marriage encouraged by his stake president Richard Cracroft who was a BYU professor. Cracroft later stated in reference to the event that, "admittedly, not many of us [church leaders] know how to counsel homosexuals."
- Unnamed (1987) — Painter Randall Lake, who was gay and had married a woman in an LDS temple before leaving the marriage, produced several portraits of suicide, including one of his Mormon boyfriend who had hanged himself a few days after he was ostracized when they both came out.
- Stuart Matis (2000) — 32-year-old Matis, a gay Mormon active in the church, died by suicide on 25 February 2000 on the steps of a California church stake center building where the apostle Jeffrey Holland was scheduled to speak that day. His death came during the height of the LDS Church's fight to ban same-sex marriage in California with Proposition 22, also known as Knight's Initiative. Shortly before his death he wrote a 12-page letter to his cousin in which he states that when he heard the church was asking members to donate time and money in support of Prop 22 he "cried for hours in [his] room" and he felt that the church's positions created an environment "hostile for young gay Mormons." The letter also stated "straight members have absolutely no idea what it is like to grow up gay in this church.... It is a life of constant torment, self-hatred and internalized homophobia." The same month he also wrote a letter to the editor that was published in BYU's newspaper pleading for the acceptance of homosexual individuals in response to a letter published five days before which had compared homosexuality to pedophilia, bestiality and Satanism. Right before his death he wrote a note stating, "The church has no idea that ... there are surely boys and girls on their callused hands and knees imploring God to free them of their pain. They hate themselves ... God never intended me to be straight. Hopefully, my death might be a catalyst for some good."
- D.J. Thompson (2000) — Two weeks after Stuart's death a 33-year-old gay Mormon man in Florida died by suicide after writing a note referencing Stuart's death. The note stated that Proposition 22 was the "last straw in my lifelong battle to see peace in the world."
- Clay Whitmer (2000) — Three weeks after Stuart's death, another gay Mormon in California who was involved in his church community was a victim of suicide. Whitmer, who had become close friends with Matis while the two were serving an LDS mission in Italy had attempted suicide six times over the space of several years, but died by suicide on the seventh attempt after Matis' death.
- Bryan Michael Egnew (2011) — After 40-year-old Egnew came out as gay to his wife, she immediately left North Carolina with their children, his family shunned him, and local leaders excommunicated him within two weeks because he refused to denounce his sexual orientation. He died by suicide a few weeks later.
- Jack Denton Reese (2012) — Seventeen-year-old Reese was from a small town in Utah where over 90% of the residents were LDS. He died by suicide in 2012 after experiencing severe physical and verbal bullying at school.
- Harry Fisher (2016) — Fisher was a 28-year-old BYU history student and had come out on Facebook about two months before his death on 12 February. He reported hearing anti-gay rhetoric from individuals around him and leaving church meetings to cry in his car.
- Lincoln Parkin (2016) — Parkin was a 22-year-old man who grew up in Pleasant View, Utah and received an award in 2012 for reestablishing the gay–straight alliance at Weber High School after having a gay friend die by suicide. He attended Westminster College and had attempted suicide before having experienced significant depression for a decade but died by suicide on 6 April.
- Braxton Taylor (2016) — On September 23, 19-year-old Taylor, a student of Weber State University, died by suicide. His story gained media attention when an LDS political candidate criticized his suicide and sexual orientation as a sin of murder and homosexuality, a statement which received national criticism.
- Stockton Powers (2016) — After a suicide attempt in 2012, 17-year-old Stockton died from suicide in 2016. He reported in 2015 that many church members had stopped talking to him after he came out and excluded him from events, with some mothers in his congregation stating they would not allow their sons to go to Scout camp if Stockton went.

== Latter-day Saint LGBTQ suicide attempts and ideation ==
Suicide attempts and ideation have been experienced by many LGBT Latter-day Saints. In a 2015 survey of 92 LGBTQ BYU students done by USGA, 52% had at some point considered self-harm. Below is a list of a at one time LDS-affiliated LGBTQ individuals who reported serious suicidal ideation or suicide attempts.

- Alex Cooper — Lesbian Latter-day Saint teen. Cooper was subjected to physically and emotionally abusive conversion therapy techniques under her Latter-day Saint parents' orders beginning in 2010 in an attempt to change her sexual orientation. She reported attempting suicide.
- Davyd Daniels — Daniels reported in 1986 that he had attempted suicide at the age of 12 due to the guilt caused by church teachings on his gay feelings.
- Clay Essig — Essig reported writing a note while at the brink of suicide after years of trying to change his attractions through therapy originally prescribed to him by his BYU bishop.
- Levi Jackman Foster — Foster is a queer artist/ photographer and activist raised as a Latter-day Saint in Alaska. He reported that, he feared rejection when he came out to himself at 15, was sent by his parents at age 16 to a conversion therapy program (Evergreen International) in Utah, had suicidal thoughts and ran away cutting ties with his family till 18.
- Tyler Glenn — Neon Trees lead singer Glenn stated that he was trying to reconcile his sexual orientation and belief in the LDS Church when the 5 November 2015 policy change was leaked leading to a feeling that church was a "toxic space" for him generating feelings of suicide.
- Laurie Lee Hall – Former stake president and church architect Laurie Lee Hall was excommunicated by her Utah local leaders in June 2017 for socially transitioning to express her gender identity as a transgender woman. She had experienced years of suicidal ideation and gender dysphoria before being released as a stake president in 2012 due to her identity and had come out to her entire congregation a year prior to her excommunication in July 2016.
- Judd Hardy – The teenage son of bishop David Eccles attempted suicide in early 1999 after coming out to family in 1995 and going through conversion therapy in an attempt to change his sexual attraction as church pamphlets said was possible. His suicide attempt happened right after a church meeting lesson on Sodom and Gomorrah. Hardy stated that it, "wasn't [done] out of despair as much as it was [done] almost out of duty. ... The church wanted me to change, and ... I couldn't change .... It was a quick resolution before doing the damage of falling into a life of sin. I believed too strongly in the church and the church's values, and I placed those above my own life." Hardy's parents would later become activists openly criticizing the LDS Church's teachings on gay people.
- Brenna McGrath — Bisexual BYU student Brenna McGrath stated in 2017 that she was attempting to overdose herself on medication after feeling isolated, and that church was a "toxic environment" for her.
- McLean — Latter-day Saint composer Michael McLean stated that his gay son (whose first name was not stated) was suicidal during the church's California campaign to ban same-sex marriage.
- Alison Kluzek — Kluzek reported that she was suicidal during a time after coming out to her religious parents as a trans woman while they initially refused her request to begin transitioning by hormone therapy. She felt that they would either have a dead son or a new daughter.
- David Malstrom — David attempted suicide on 1 May 1985 after trying to change his attractions by hyper diligence in church activities. After praying for hours and reading Kimball's Miracle of Forgiveness he decided he must end his life. He barely survived the attempt and spent five days unconscious in intensive care.
- Jordan Montgomery — In the 2013 short documentary Families are Forever, teenage Montgomery discussed his suicidal ideation as well as the attempts of a Latter-day Saint therapist to change his sexual orientation.
- Russ Baker-Gorringe — One of the Evergreen International's first board members, and a stake presidency member Russ Baker-Gorringe became severely depressed when his continued efforts to change his attractions failed, resulting in a 1999 suicide jump at Glacier National Park only prevented by his daughter.
- Alex Shafer — Shafer reported sliding into a suicidal depression after entering a mixed-orientation marriage at the end of his university studies. He had participated in Evergreen, seen several therapists, and prayed to become straight, but felt like a failure when his romantic attraction to other men did not change.
- Drew Stelter — Drew stated that interviews as a young man in the 2000s with his bishop in which attempts were made to "cast out" his attractions were torturous, shaming, blaming, and punishing and they resulted in immense self-loathing and suicidality.
- Craig Watts — In the 1999 PBS documentary Friends and Family: A Community Divided, Watts, then a young man, reported that he cried multiple times and thought of suicide again after coming out to local church leaders in Japan where he was studying and being excommunicated from the church.
- John Gustav-Wrathall — John is president of Affirmation as of 2019. As a young man after reading the promises in Kimball's The Miracle of Forgiveness John believed if he served a faithful mission that his same-sex attractions would go away and he could marry a woman and have children. He felt shattering disappointment when the promised changes did not materialize and by the end of his junior year at BYU he was ready to end his life. He stated that the book had "contributed very directly to my suicidality."
