= Timeline of LGBTQ Mormon history in the 1990s =

This is a timeline of LGBT Mormon history in the 1990s, part of a series of timelines consisting of events, publications, and speeches about LGBTQ+ individuals, topics around sexual orientation and gender minorities, and the community of members of the Church of Jesus Christ of Latter-day Saints (LDS Church). Although the historical record is often scarce, evidence points to queer individuals having existed in the Mormon community since its beginnings. However, top LDS leaders only started regularly addressing queer topics in public in the late 1950s. Since 1970, the LDS Church has had at least one official publication or speech from a high-ranking leader referencing LGBT topics every year, and a greater number of LGBT Mormon and former Mormon individuals have received media coverage.

== Timeline ==
=== 1990 ===
The 1990 edition of the "For the Strength of Youth" pamphlet called homosexuality an abomination.

- 1990 – The church published a version of the "For the Strength of Youth" pamphlet which contained its first explicit mention of homosexuality. The pamphlet was to be put "in the hands of every young person in each ward". In this pamphlet's eighth version section on "Sexual Purity" it states "the Lord specifically forbids ... sex perversion such as homosexuality". It continues "homosexual and lesbian activities are sinful and an abomination to the Lord" and "unnatural affections ... toward persons of the same gender are counter to God's eternal plan".
- April – The church distributed the booklet "Keys to Understanding Homosexuality" to its LDS Social Services employees which contained twenty-five suggestions to help male homosexual clients such as discouraging them from coming out of the closet, increasing their hope for changing their attractions, and helping them dress and act heterosexual.
- October – The first Utah pride march was held. It was organized by Connell O'Donovan who attended LDS seminary as a teen, and underwent shock and vomit aversion therapy and hypnosis therapy in attempts to change his attractions to men as recommended by his church leaders. The marchers went right past the Salt Lake temple and the event complemented the annual Utah Gay and Lesbian Pride Day Festival that had been held since 1986. During next year's march participants were met with neo-nazi protesters at the Salt Lake City and County building.
- October – Packer gave an October General Conference talk in which he warned against "spiritually dangerous lifestyles" including "abortion, the gay-lesbian movement, and drug addiction" continuing to state that using scriptures to justify "perverted acts" of "gay or lesbian conduct" between "consenting adults" would by the same logic justify the "molesting of little children".
- November – Church spokesperson John Lyons stated, "whether you are talking about homosexual or heterosexual activity, the same rule applies. Since there is no marriage between homosexuals, then sexual activity between them is not acceptable under our principles."

=== 1991 ===
- 1991 – Gamofites, a support group for gay Mormon fathers, is founded.
- March – During a case hearing Young Men's president and church Seventy Jack H. Goaslind gave a testimonial and stated on record that "[the church] would withdraw" from the Boy Scouts of America if homosexual youth were allowed to join, implying a current church policy banning youth based on sexual orientation. In March 1910 the church's Young Men's Mutual Improvement Association had adopted the Boy Scouts of America program as the church-wide program for young men in the US.
- May – The play Angels in America which prominently featured a gay Mormon man in a mixed-orientation marriage debuted in San Francisco. It would go on to a Broadway run, winning Tony Awards, a Pulitzer prize, and spawning a 2003 HBO miniseries.
- June – Peculiar People: Mormons and Same-Sex Orientation is published by Ron Schow, Wayne Schow, and Marybeth Raynes. The book includes essays and experiences by gay and lesbian Latter-day Saints.
- November – The First Presidency sent a letter on November 14 to be read in all congregations stating "homosexual and lesbian behavior is sinful" and that homosexual "thoughts and feelings, regardless of their causes, can and should be overcome" by "sincere repentance", "persistent effort", "the help of others", and "counsel from their bishop". The letter made a distinction "between immoral thoughts and feelings and participating in ... any homosexual behavior", and calls for "love and understanding" for those "struggling" to "overcom[e] inappropriate thoughts and feelings".

=== 1992 ===
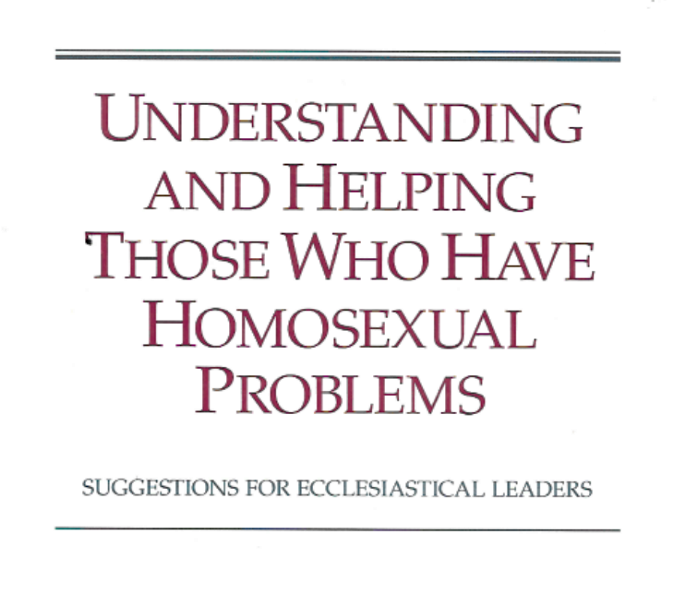
Cover of a 1992 manual which marked a shift in LDS church rhetoric towards changing homosexual behavior rather than feelings.

- 1992 – The church published "Understanding and Helping Those Who Have Homosexual Problems" as a guide for ecclesiastical leaders. The six-page booklet states, "There is a distinction between immoral thoughts and feelings and participating in ... homosexual behavior. However, such thoughts and feelings, regardless of their causes can and should be overcome and sinful behavior should be eliminated." It further advised, "members can overcome these problems by turning to the Lord." "In some cases, heterosexual feelings emerge leading to happy, eternal marriage relationships." The pamphlet did not frame homosexuality as a disease corresponding to the recent change by the World Health Organization removing homosexuality as a mental disorder. However, it continued to deny any biological origins stating "there is no conclusive evidence that anyone is born with a homosexual orientation."
- April – Seventy Vaughn Featherstone decried the attempts at legalizing homosexuality during his lifetime as among compromising, drifting philosophies in his general conference speech.
- April – The apostle Packer stated in general conference that humans can degrade themselves below animals by pairing with people of the same-sex since animals do not mate with other animals of the same sex. However, same-sex pairing has been observed in more than 1,500 species, and well-documented for 500 of them. He had also stated this a month prior in a sermon at BYU.
- October – Then apostle Russell Nelson stated in general conference that the AIDS epidemic was a plague fueled by a vocal few concerned with civil rights and abetted by immoral people.

=== 1993 ===
- 1993 – Family Fellowship, a support group for LDS who have LGBT family members, is founded.
- 1993 – The Encyclopedia of Mormonism is published containing former presiding bishop Victor L. Brown's article titled "Homosexuality." It stated that "the divine mandate of marriage between man and woman puts in perspective why homosexual acts are offensive to God. They repudiate the gift and the Giver of eternal life." The church's flagship school Brigham Young University has owned the copyright to the Encyclopedia since 2001.
- 1993 – WordPerfect co-founder Bruce Bastian divorced his wife and publicly came out as gay. After leaving the church, he later married his husband Clint Ford. Bastian has made large donations to Encircle, the Utah Pride Center, Equality Utah, and the Utah AIDS Foundation.

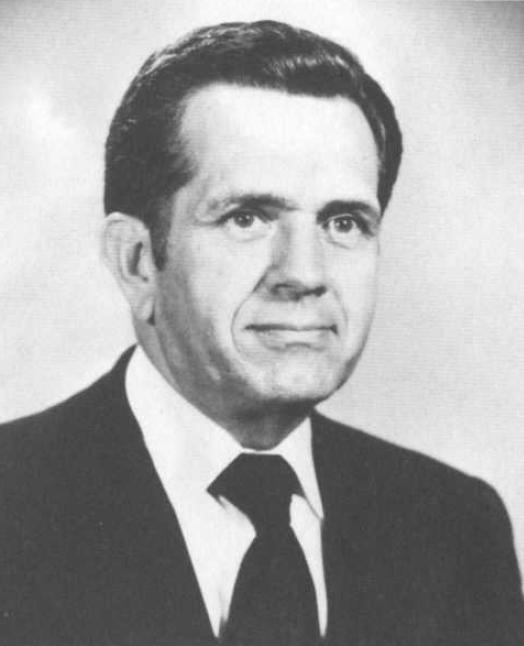
Apostle Boyd K. Packer played a large role in shaping over three decades of teachings on homosexuality through numerous speeches containing the subject.

- May – Packer gave his May 18 "Talk to the All-Church Coordinating Council" (composed of the First Presidency, the Quorum of the Twelve, and the Presiding Bishopric). In it Packer identified three groups, that pose a "temptation" or "danger" to "lead away" members: those in the "gay and lesbian" and "feminist" movements, and "so-called scholars or intellectuals". In the address he stated that a man who self-identifies as a homosexual has "gender disorientation".
- September – The September Six are excommunicated. They include the feminist Lavina Fielding Anderson and historian D. Michael Quinn. Despite his excommunication and critical writings, Quinn, who is now openly gay, still considers himself to be a Latter-day Saint.
- October – Apostle Dallin H. Oaks gave a conference address stating that "Satan seeks to ... confuse gender" and "there are many political, legal, and social pressures for changes that confuse gender and homogenize the differences between men and women".
- October – Church Seventy Spencer J. Condie related a story of a homosexual man's conversion in his October General Conference talk. Condie calls "homosexual tendencies" an unclean "addictive behavior" that the man in the story developed "gradually" after being "introduced" to it "in his early youth" after which he had "relationships" which brought him "misery". Later the man read the Book of Mormon, experienced a "mighty change of heart", and was baptized and married a woman.

=== 1994 ===
- 1994 – Disciples2, a confidential online and email support group, was founded. It operated from 1994 to about 2013 for male and female "strugglers" striving to follow church teachings.
- 1994 – BYU published an anthropology masters thesis titled Cross-Cultural Categories of Female Homosexuality.
- February – The First Presidency issued a statement declaring that the church "opposes any efforts" towards same-sex marriage and encourages members "to appeal to legislators ... to reject all efforts to ... support marriages between persons of the same gender."
- April – Apostle Boyd K. Packer gave a conference address mentioning "gender identity" and "those confused about gender" as well as stating that changes in the laws around marriage and gender threaten the family.
- May – Deseret Book published Laurie Campbell's Born That Way? under a pen name on her leaving a relationship with a woman and marrying a man. This was the first book talking about an LGBTQ experience sold at Deseret Book.
- October – Apostle Richard G. Scott gave a conference address restating a part of Spencer W. Kimball's October 1980 conference talk by saying that "stimulation" or masturbation can lead to "acts of homosexuality".
- October – The apostle Joseph B. Wirthlin gave a general conference address in which he stated, "we are to avoid abnormal sexual behavior, including fornication, homosexual behavior, child molestation, or any other perversion of God’s plan of happiness."
- November – Apostle James E. Faust gave a speech at BYU in which he stated that homosexuality is not biological or inborn and that same-sex marriage would unravel families, the fabric of human society.

=== 1995 ===
- mid-1990s – BYU's on-campus electroshock aversion therapy program which had begun in 1959 ended over three decades later in the mid-1990s.
- 1995 – The church's Family Services published the manual "Understanding and Helping Individuals with Homosexual Problems" advising practitioners how to prevent and treat homosexuality saying, "There is sufficient scientific research and clinical evidence to conclude that homosexuality is treatable and preventable." The guide states that male homosexuality is caused by "the motivation to repair the loss of the father-son relationship creat[ing] sexualized father-hunger or reparative drive", and that "in the homosexual male this core gender identity has become confused". The manual cites "the roots of lesbianism" as "a dysfunctional family relationship" and/or "physical, sexual and emotional abuse" which causes women to "have a tendency to develop overly dependent or enmeshed emotional relationships". The guide further states that the "love between homosexuals is pseudo-love".
- January – The church's newspaper published an article by BYU professor Daniel Judd in which he stated that the power of Christ freed a man from his problem of homosexuality.
- February – The LDS Church begins efforts opposing same-sex marriage laws including recruiting members to work with and donate to Hawaii's Future Today in opposition to efforts to legalize same-sex marriage in Hawaii. Pamphlets were spread in church meetings and church facilities were used to fax statements to legislative committees. The campaign spanned years and the church reported giving $600,000 in 1998 to the Hawaiian political-action group Save Traditional Marriage '98.
- April – The apostle Richard G. Scott stated in general conference that participating in homosexual acts is a deviant, unacceptable alternate lifestyle, and requires long sustained repentance and many prayers in order to receive forgiveness.
- September – James E. Faust gave a First Presidency member message in the September Ensign in which he denies any biological or "inherited" components in the etiology of homosexuality citing "no scientific evidence" supporting the "false belief of inborn homosexual orientation" leading to "so-called alternative lifestyles". He continued that if there was an inherited or inborn aspect to homosexuality it would "frustrate the whole plan of mortal happiness" and deny "the opportunity to change" leading to "discouragement, disappointment, and despair". The article also stated that same-sex relationships would also help "unravel the fabric of human society" and if practiced by everyone would "mean the end of the human family".

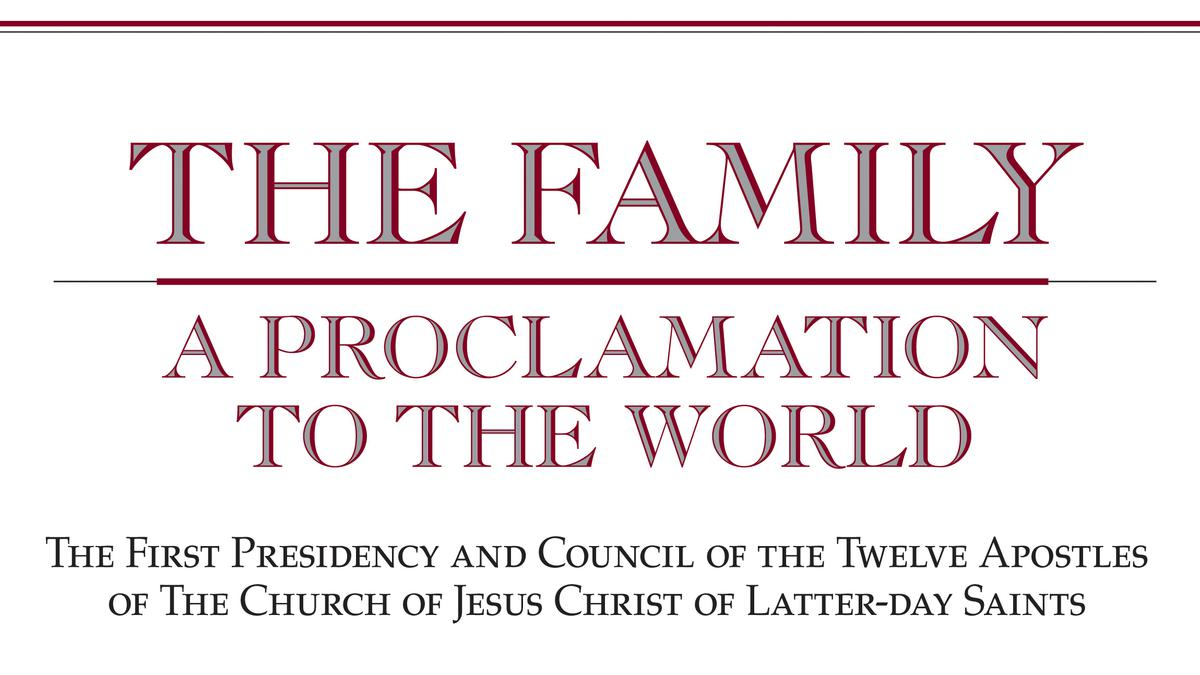
"The Family: A Proclamation to the World" is a 1995 LDS church statement used as a legal document in several court case amicus briefs opposing same-sex marriage.

- September – "The Family: A Proclamation to the World" was read on September 23, 1995, at the Relief Society General Conference meeting by Gordon B. Hinckley. The document states that "marriage between a man and a woman is ordained of God" and "is essential to His eternal plan". It also teaches that everyone is a "spirit son or daughter of heavenly parents" and "gender is an essential characteristic of individual premortal, mortal, and eternal identity and purpose". It has been submitted by the church in amicus briefs as evidence against court cases which could legalize same-sex marriages.
- October – Gordon B. Hinckley gave an October General Conference talk in which he states that "same-sex marriage" is an "immoral practic[e]" though he says that members of the churth "reach out" their hearts "to those who struggle with feelings of affinity for the same gender" and "remember" them, "sympathize with" them, and regard them as brothers and sisters.
- October – Church Seventy Durrel A. Woolsey stated in general conference that Satan makes powerful and ungodly proclamations like "same-gender intimate associations and even marriages are acceptable."
- October – The church published an article by apostle Dallin H. Oaks in the October edition of the monthly Ensign magazine. in which Oaks states "we insist that erotic feelings toward a person of the same sex are irregular", but that "our doctrines obviously condemn those who engage in so-called 'gay bashing'—physical or verbal attacks". He says members should encourage those with AIDS to participate in church activities. He also seems to contradict Faust's address from a month earlier by giving a nuanced view on potential biological components of the etiology of homosexuality stating "some kinds of feelings seem to be inborn" while others "seem to be acquired from a complex interaction of 'nature and nurture,". He continues, "the feelings ... that increase susceptibility to certain behavior may have some relationship to inheritance". However, Oaks discourages members from calling themselves or other people lesbian or gay saying, "we should refrain from using [gay and lesbian] as nouns to identify specific persons. Our religious doctrine dictates this usage. It is wrong to use these words to denote a condition."

=== 1996 ===
- 1996 – Previously excommunicated Mormon historian D. Michael Quinn and his controversial book Same-Sex Dynamics Among Nineteenth-Century Americans: A Mormon Example both came out.

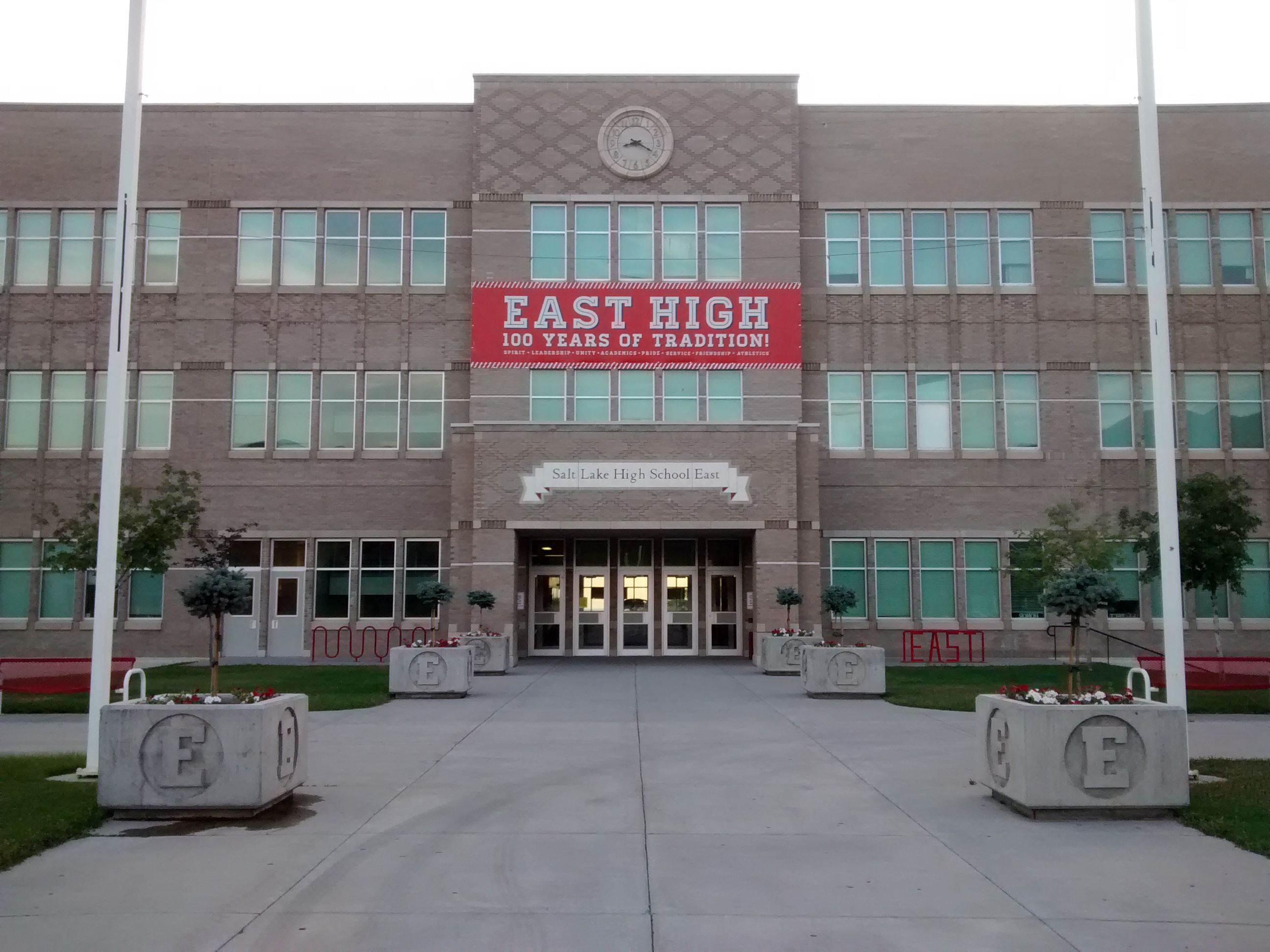
In 1996 a Salt Lake City high school became a focal point of tension between LGBT individuals and a largely LDS city administration and population.

- January – In California a letter was read to all congregations from the North American West Area Presidency encouraging members to contact their legislators in support of a California assembly bill (AB 1982) against the recognition of any same-sex marriages.
- February – Salt Lake City became the only US city to have its Board of Education ban all students clubs after Mormon students Erin Wiser and Kelli Peterson formed an East High School club called the "Gay/Straight Alliance" in September 1995. The club had cited a federal law sponsored by LDS Utah Senator Orrin Hatch which forbade school boards from discriminating against clubs, although, Hatch stated that the law was never meant to promote "immoral speech or activity". Four-hundred of Salt Lake's high school students protested the ban. One Mormon senior at East High was quoted stating that he would rather all clubs be banned than allow the gay-straight alliance. Additionally, Mormon state representative Grant Protzman stated "I think that many legislators have serious concerns about the group’s moving into recruitment of fresh meat for the gay population." Club founder Peterson responded that recruitment was not at all what the club is about, stating that it was founded to help her and her LGBT friends deal with a hostile school atmosphere where she faced physical and verbal assault as an out lesbian. In response to the gay-straight alliance group, some students at West High formed the Student Against Faggots Everywhere (SAFE) group.
- July – BYU Spanish professor Thomas Matthews was reported to a top LDS authority for previously stating that he was gay in private conversations. He stated that BYU did not like that he was out of the closet despite being celibate and keeping BYU codes of conduct, and eventually left the university a few months later. BYU president Lee had stated that it was "simply not comfortable for the university" for him to continue teaching there.

=== 1997 ===
- 1997 – A poll of over 400 BYU students found that 42% of students believed that even if a same-sex attracted person keeps the honor code they should not be allowed to attend BYU and nearly 80% said they would not live with a roommate attracted to people of the same sex. The poll's stated 5 percent margin of error was criticized as being too low an estimate because of the cluster sampling in classes, however.

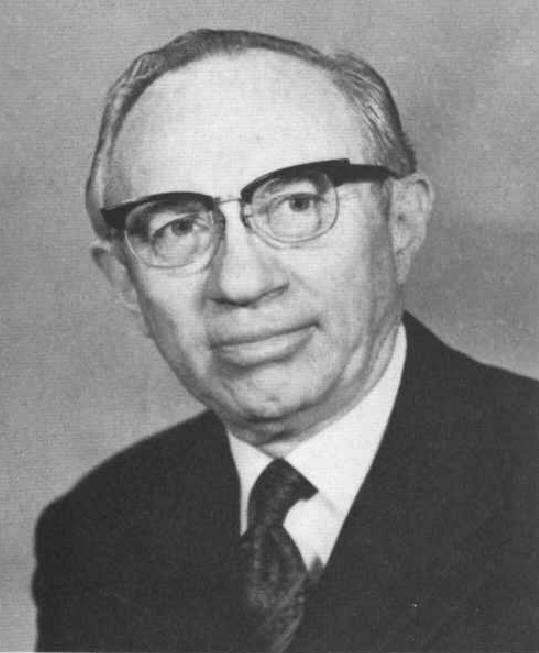
During his 13 years as president, Hinckley brought a shift in tone towards empathy in church public discussions on homosexuality.

- January – Issue of the church's Ensign magazine contained an anonymously authored article "Becoming Whole Again". In it the author who was married to a woman discussed his struggle with "same-gender attraction" calling it a "trial", "weakness", "impure thought", "temptation", and "misguided feeling" caused by "longing for true brotherly love or a desire for masculine characteristics". At the end the author states "same-gender attraction can be successfully resisted and overcome".
- March – Church president Hinckley stated at the World Forum of Silicon Valley that the church would "do all it can to stop the recognition of same-sex marriage in the United States."
- March – Church seventy Bruce C. Hafen presented at the World Congress of Families in the Czech Republic. He stated that one thing that will unbridle societal principles and harm us was legalizing same-sex marriage and that, "if the law endorses everything it tolerates, we will eventually tolerate everything and endorse nothing—except tolerance."
- April – Gordon B. Hinckley, president of the church, gave an interview in April in which he stated "we have gays in the church. Good people." He continued saying that no action is taken against them unless they're involved in sexual transgression, in which case there are "certain penalties" same as with "heterosexuals". He reaffirmed the stance that God made marriage for one man and one woman and that essentially gay people must live a "celibate life".
- July – General authorities Marlin Jensen, Loren Dunn, and Richard Wirthlin gave recommendations to the church Public Affairs Committee that the church's priesthood structure could be used to gather 70% of the required 700,000 signatures and raise up to $2 million to place an anti-same-sex-marriage ballot on California's June 1998 primary election.
- November – The church Seventy Jay E. Jensen told a reporter that the LDS Church offers gay people help and support that will point them to happiness. He had presented at the September Evergreen International conference two months before.

=== 1998 ===
- 1998 – The Church Handbook is updated to ban members from full-time missionary service who have participated in "homosexual acts" from age 15 and on unless it has been at least one year since the occurrence and the leaders see "strong evidence of lasting repentance and reformation". The update also includes the first church policies sections on homosexuality and same-gender marriage stating if members have "homosexual thoughts or feelings or engage in homosexual actions" they should be helped to understand faith, repentance, life's purpose, and should be helped to "accept responsibility for their thoughts". Additionally, the manual asserts that the Church "opposes any efforts to legalize" same-gender marriages and encourages members to appeal to government officials to reject those efforts.
- October – The church donated a half million dollars to oppose efforts to legalize same-sex marriage in Alaska.
- October – Church president Gordon B. Hinckley gave a general conference sermon and said "so-called gays and lesbians" have "certain inclinations which are powerful and which may be difficult to control". He continued "We want to help these people ... with their problems ... and difficulties", as well as stating "we love them" but made it clear that the church could not support "so-called same-sex marriage".
- October – Two days later twenty-one-year-old gay student Matthew Shepard was tortured and left for dead by Mormon-raised Eagle Scout Russell Henderson, and Aaron McKinney in Laramie, Wyoming. McKinney would later state "The night I did it, I did have hatred for homosexuals" and that he target Shepard because "he was obviously gay. That played a part. His weakness. His frailty." Mormon congregations joined other Laramie denominations in including Shepard's family in their prayers. Rulon Stacey, the LDS CEO of the Colorado hospital where Shepard died, became caught in the ensuing media storm and later stated that he received hate mail for expressing grief and support over a gay murder victim and his family. In The Laramie Project play about the murder, there are parts with an LDS stake leader and LDS home teachers to the family of one of Shepard's killers.

=== 1999 ===
- May – The Area Presidency of the North America West Area, composed of Area Seventies, sent a letter to all area leaders directing a letter to be read in all California sacrament meeting which directed members to "do all you can by donating your means and time" to ensure that Proposition 22 (known as the Knight Initiative) passed. This act restricted marriage recognition in California to that between a man and a woman denying homosexual or same-sex couples legal recognition of their unions. A follow-up letter directed to stake presidents from Area Seventy Douglas L. Callister on May 20 assigned them to invite church members to donate money to the "Defense of Marriage Committee" in order to pass Prop 22. A third letter was released eight months later on January 11 a month and a half before the proposition would pass asking members to "redouble their efforts" in contacting neighbors and friends and to place the "provided yard signs" in their lawns.
- September – The church's Ensign magazine published an article by Family Services assistant commissioner A. Dean Byrd who also served on the Evergreen Board of Trustees. Byrd posited that "homosexuality is not innate and unchangeable", but is caused by "temperament, personality traits, sexual abuse, familial factors, and treatment by one’s peers". He further asserted that individuals can "diminish homosexual attraction" and that "when homosexual difficulties have been fully resolved, heterosexual feelings can emerge". In support of this he stated "many individuals who have experienced homosexual difficulties have" had their "burdens" or "trial" "lifted through the Lord’s grace." The article continued acknowledging that those who desire to diminish their "homosexual urgings" may "experience extreme pain because of the extensive changes that are required" including "changing one’s thoughts ... friendships ... or even clothing styles".
- October – Church president Hinckley stated in general conference that, "so-called same-sex marriage ... is not a matter of civil rights; it is a matter of morality. ... There is no justification to redefine what marriage is." He added, "we love and honor" and "our hearts reach out to ... gays and lesbians" and "they are welcome in the church".
- October – Some members of Affirmation in Salt Lake City protested the church's lobbying and funding of initiatives in California and other states to keep the traditional definition of marriage.
- November – Director of BYU's World Family Policy Center Kathryn Balmforth addressed the World Congress of Families in Geneva. In her speech she stated that gay rights activists are part of an anti-family movement that is hijacking human rights by legal force to gain power and "curtail the freedom of most of humanity."
- November – A PBS documentary on the intersection between the Utah Mormon community and homosexuality titled "Friends and Family: A Community Divided" aired on Utah's public television. It featured interviews from LDS Family Fellowship leaders and their gay son and lesbian daughter, LDS bishop and Evergreen International director David Pruden, a lesbian active Mormon, and a gay active Mormon man married to a woman.
- December – After attending the World Congress of Families in Geneva, Switzerland, Latter-day Saint Sharon Slater founded Family Watch International (originally called Global Helping to Advance Women and Children) in Gilbert, Arizona. The group has been involved with supporting anti-LGBTQ legislation abroad, especially in Africa. Since then, Slater herself has stated her opposition to “fictitious sexual rights”.

== See also ==
- Homosexuality and The Church of Jesus Christ of Latter-day Saints
- Law of adoption (Mormonism)
- LGBT rights in Utah
- LGBT Mormon suicides
- List of Christian denominational positions on homosexuality
- Mormonism in the 20th century
- Sexuality and Mormonism
