= Sexual orientation change efforts and the LDS Church =

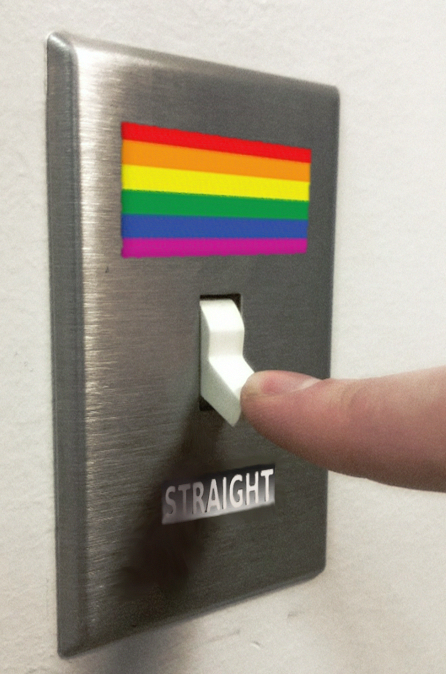
The 2011 Broadway musical The Book of Mormon satirized church teachings on changing sexual orientation with an LDS missionary character saying he could "turn it off like a light switch" in reference to his gay feelings.

Because of its ban against same-sex sexual activity and same-sex marriage, the Church of Jesus Christ of Latter-day Saints (LDS Church) has a long history of teaching that its adherents who are attracted to the same sex can and should attempt to alter their feelings through righteous striving and sexual orientation change efforts (or SOCE, also called conversion therapy or reparative therapy). Reparative therapy is the pseudoscientific practice of attempting to change an individual's sexual orientation from homosexual or bisexual to heterosexual, or their gender identity from transgender to cisgender using psychological, physical, or spiritual interventions. There is no reliable evidence that such practices can alter sexual orientation or gender identity, and many medical institutions warn that sexual orientation change efforts are ineffective and potentially harmful. In 2019, the church's tacit endorsement of conversion therapy was announced as overturned when a spokesperson for the church stated, "We are opposed to conversion therapy and our therapists do not practice it."

The LDS Church's statements and actions have overwhelmingly focused on male homosexuality and rarely mention lesbianism or bisexuality. Current teachings and policies leave homosexual members with the option of entering a mixed-orientation opposite-sex marriage, or lifelong celibacy without any sexual expression (including masturbation).

While the LDS church has somewhat softened its stances toward LGBTQ individuals in recent years, leaders continued to communicate into 2015 that changing one's sexual orientation was possible through personal righteousness, prayer, faith in Christ, psychotherapy, and group therapy and retreats. Local church leaders sometimes used church funds to pay for conversion therapies into at least 2015. From 1976 until 1989 the Church Handbook called for church discipline for members attracted to the same sex, equating merely being homosexual with the seriousness of acts of adultery and child molestation—even celibate gay people were subject to excommunication. Church publications now state that "individuals do not choose to have such attractions", the church opposes conversion therapy, its church-run therapy services no longer provides sexual orientation change efforts, and the church has no official stance on the causes of homosexuality.

== History ==
Stances towards the mutability of homosexuality by church leaders have softened over the years. In the 1960s and 1970s Church leaders taught that homosexuality was a curable disease and they encouraged self-help attempts by homosexual members to change their sexual orientation and cultivate heterosexual feelings. To assist in this, leaders developed an aversion therapy program on BYU campus for gay adolescents and adults from 1959 to the mid-1990s since simply being attracted to people of the same sex was an excommunicable sin under church president Kimball. Teachings later changed as it became clear these self-help and aversive techniques were not working and, thus, from the 1980s to the 2000s reparative therapy (also called conversion therapy) became the dominant treatment method. It was often recommended by Evergreen in an attempt to help homosexual members "unchoose" or "unlearn" their attractions.

In a 2010 survey of 625 Utah individuals 55% of Mormons believed sexual orientation could be changed, and a 2015 survey of 1,612 LGBT Mormons and former Mormons found that 73% of men and 43% of women had attempted sexual orientation change, usually through multiple methods across many years. Counselor-led sexual orientation change efforts dwindled among members around 2015 as church teachings evolved with leaders explicitly stating in 2012 that same-sex sexual attractions were not a choice and affirming in 2016 that therapy focusing on a change in sexual orientation was unethical.

A table summarizing some of the major shifts in official dialogue is found below.

Summary of changes in teachings on sexual orientation change efforts
Topic	Earlier teachings	Transitional teachings	Current teachings
Sexual orientation change efforts	Electroshock aversion therapy recommended, reparative therapy encouraged, curable disease, should be overcome	Conversion therapy may be appropriate, denounces any abusive practices	Church opposed to it, and church therapists no longer practice it
Heterosexual dating & marriage	As a therapeutic step		Not to be seen as a therapy or solution

== Aversion therapy at BYU ==
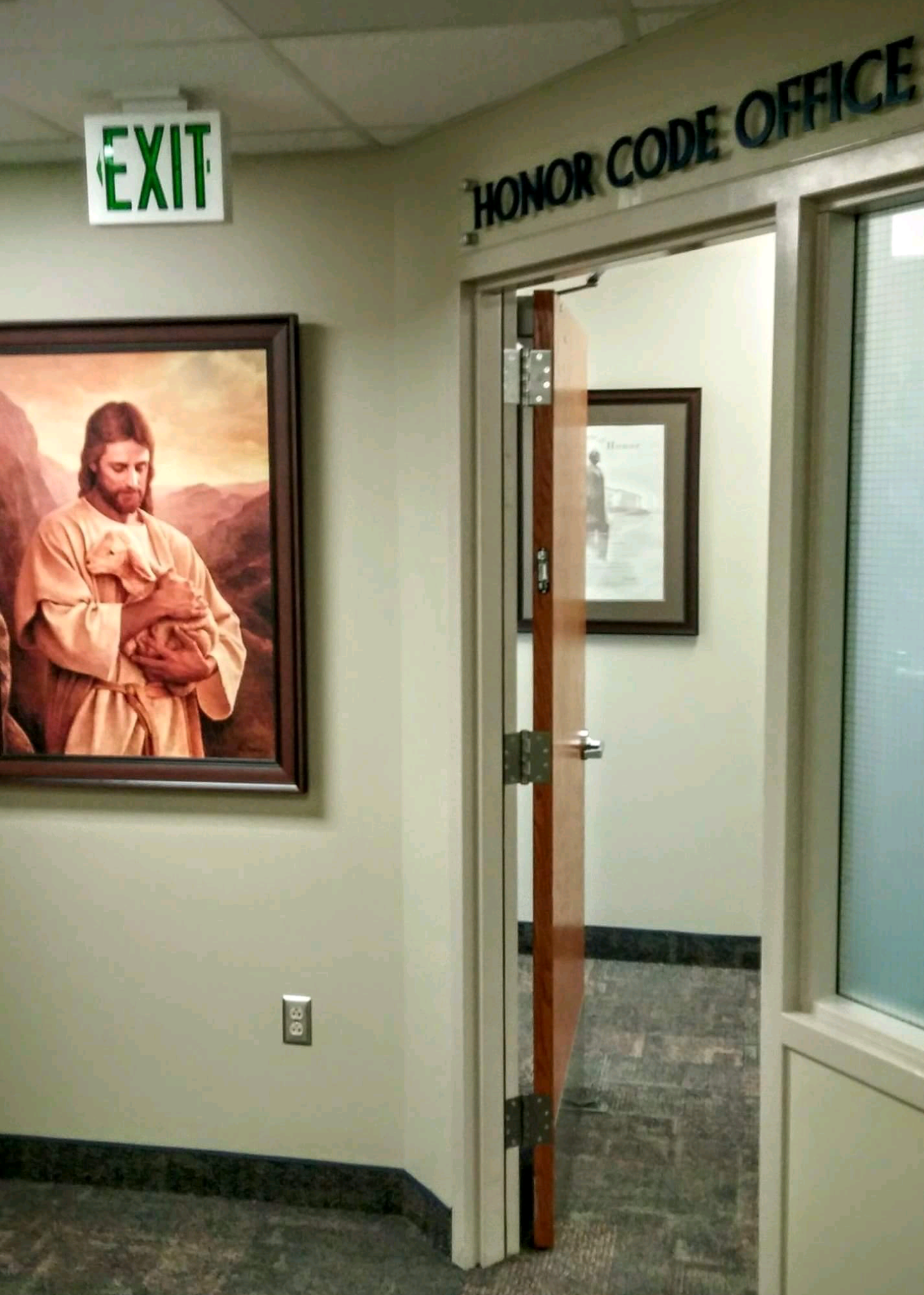
BYU's Honor Code office required some students reported for homosexual behavior to undergo electroshock and vomit aversion therapies in the 1970s

In 1959, BYU began administering "aversion therapy" to "cure," "repair," or "reorient" homosexual feelings or behavior among Mormon males. The on-campus program lasted through the 60s and 70s, and faded out over three decades later in the mid-1990s. BYU mental health counselors, LDS bishops, stake presidents, mission presidents, general authorities, and the BYU Standards Office (equivalent to today's Honor Code Office) all referred young men to the BYU program. Gerald J. Dye, who was over the University Standards Office from 1971 to 1980 (renamed the Honor Code Office in 1991), stated that part of the "set process" for homosexual BYU students referred to his office for "less serious" offenses was to require that they undergo therapy to remain at BYU and that in special cases this included "electroshock and vomiting aversion therapies." From 1975 to 1976 Max Ford McBride, a student at BYU, conducted electroshock aversion therapy on 17 men (with 14 completing the treatment) and published a dissertation on the use of electrical aversive techniques to treat ego-dystonic homosexuality. Participant in the 1975–76 BYU study Don Harryman wrote that he experienced "burns on [his] arms and ... emotional trauma." In 2011 BYU admitted to the past use of electroshock therapy.

== Criticisms ==
Past leaders' teachings on reparative therapy and the origins of homosexuality have been criticized. In the late 90s psychiatrist Jeffery R. Jensen, a University of Utah alumnus, criticized church reparative therapy modalities and etiological theories around homosexuality in multiple presentations as lacking scientific integrity as he believed they were dictated from top church leaders rather than drawn from actual empirical observation by trained professionals. He also stated that current church publications on the subject were condescending, dehumanizing pontifications using caricatures and stereotypes of gay men and lesbians to distort knowledge and facts in order to justify oppressive standards and norms. He continued asserting that "far too many of our lesbian and gay youths kill themselves because of what you say about them" since gay men and lesbians cannot be made heterosexual, and "those who believe your false promises and remain celibate in the hopes of eventual 'cure' are consigned to a misery." Soon after, The American Psychiatric Association disavowed therapy trying to change sexual orientation as ineffective and destructive.

== Timeline of LDS actions and discussions around preventing and changing homosexuality ==
LDS church leaders explicitly promoted therapy attempts to change sexual orientation in the past, but have recently shifted away from those previous views. Some events and publications around reparative or conversion therapy and the LDS church are shown below:

=== 1930s ===
- 1930s – Newspapers in the largely LDS Utah cities of Salt Lake and Ogden discussed ways of altering sexuality such as hormone treatment, by educating young children in mixed-sex schools, and by one attempting to wean oneself from same-sex attractions via an opposite-sex romantic relationship. Another article stated that one woman's homosexuality stemmed from a traumatic witnessing of her mother in a painful delivery of a sibling, and that increased divorces and decreasing young marriages contributed to an increase in homosexuality. The article added "it is possible" but, "very difficult to change an adult homosexual into a normal man or woman", and "they must be determined individuals."

=== 1940s ===
- 1948 – Gay BYU students Kent Goodridge Taylor and Richard Snow, who were in love, went to visit with church president George Albert Smith, who told them to "live their lives as best they could" in their companionship. Smith wrote the words "Homo Sexual" in his appointment book. Earl Kofoed, who went from BYU from 1946 to 1948, similarly reported a "live and let live" attitude of leaders towards LGBT Mormons, and described a thriving gay community of friends at BYU. He stated that there were no witch hunts, excommunications, or pressure to change one's sexual orientation at BYU like there would be in later decades.

=== 1950s ===
- 1959 – Church leaders begin their electroshock aversion therapy program on BYU campus in an attempt to change the sexual orientation of gay teens and men. The on-campus program lasted over three decades into the mid-90s.

=== 1960s ===
- 1960 – The church newspaper printed an article on homosexuality based on a speech from a Salt Lake City psychiatrist. The article said male homosexuality was an illness caused by an absent father and a domineering mother in early adolescence which caused the child to identify more with the female. It added homosexuality could be cured by psychiatric treatment, and prevented by fathers "wear[ing] the pants in the family" and working and playing with their boys.
- 1961 – An editorial in the church newspaper by apostle Mark Petersen used the rape and murder of an 11-year-old girl in American Fork, Utah to characterize homosexual people as child rapists and "deviates pose[ing] a danger to children on every street in every community". He added, "homosexuals ... are emotionally sick and disabled creatures. ... They are waiting. They are hunting. They are seeking .... The deviates prowl that jungle."
- 1961 – Apostle Lee gave a lengthy anecdote about a woman in love with another woman stating that the ugly practice and unpardonable sin of homosexuality is more common than we realize. He had her promise to never return to homosexuality and pray to become what he termed a normal, natural woman.

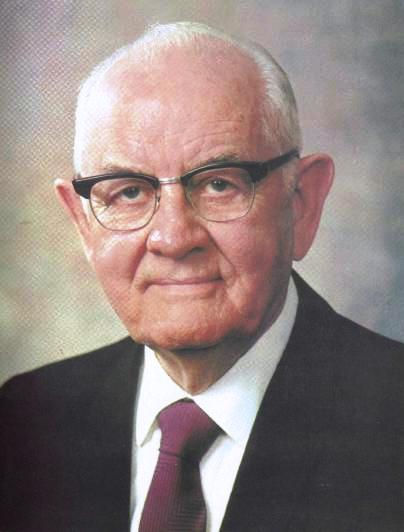
Spencer W. Kimball was assigned as a church specialist on homosexuality in 1947 and shaped church teachings on the subject through numerous speeches and publications in the '60s and '70s.

- 1964 – Apostle Kimball addressed seminary and institute faculty on BYU campus calling homosexuality a "malady", "disease", and an "abominable and detestable crime against nature" that was "curable" by "self mastery". He cited one lay bishop (a businessman by trade) assigned by the church to administer a "program of rehabilitation" through which there had been "numerous cures". He said "the police, the courts, and the judges" had referred "many cases directly" to the church.
- 1965 – Kimball again addressed homosexuality in a January 5 BYU speech. He called it a "gross", "heinous", "obnoxious", "abominable" "vicious" sin. The text states that those with homosexual "desires and tendencies" could "correct" and "overcome" it "the same as if he had the urge toward petting or fornication or adultery", but that "the cure ... is like the cure for alcoholism, subject to continued vigilance". In the speech he stated BYU "will never knowingly enroll ... nor tolerate ... anyone with these tendencies who fails to repent", and that it is a "damnable heresy" for a homosexual person to say "God made them that way". He also stated that sometimes masturbation is an introduction to homosexuality.
- 1967 – The church's newspaper published an editorial which discouraged mothers from over-indulging their sons as it may turn them against parenthood and women, and this rebellion had driven one son into a homosexual life.

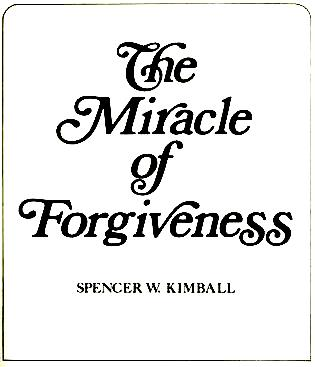
Kimball's influential book taught that homosexuality was curable and was officially recommended as a resource for homosexual members into the 90s.

- 1969 – Kimball released his book The Miracle of Forgiveness, in which he teaches that masturbation can lead to acts of homosexuality. His book was quoted in a 1979 church manual: "the glorious thing to remember is that [homosexuality] is curable .... Certainly it can be overcome .... How can you say the door cannot be opened until your knuckles are bloody, till your head is bruised, till your muscles are sore?" Kimball viewed many homosexuals as "basically good people who have become trapped in sin" and that "some totally conquer homosexuality in a few months." However, he also says that homosexual behavior can lead to sex with animals.
- 1969 – An article in the church's newspaper quoted one school superintendent discouraging sex-segregated children's schooling since, "All-boy school or all-girl schools tend to reinforce a deviant way of life ... and homosexual behavior is likely to result."

=== Early 1970s ===
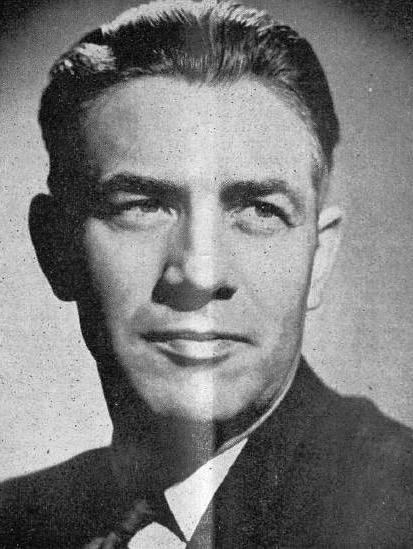
The apostle Mark E. Petersen was one of the church's primary voices on the topic of homosexuality in the 70s and 80s along with Spencer W. Kimball and Boyd K. Packer.

- 1970 – Church leaders released the Bishop's Training Course and Self-Help Guide for leaders which stated, "[t]hough many have been told [homosexuality] is incurable, that is not true."
- 1970 – The church produced Hope for Transgressors in which apostles Spencer W. Kimball and Mark E. Petersen offer ideas to leaders about how to effect a "total cure" and "bring the lives of [men with homosexual tendencies] into total normalcy" and "help these people recover" (lesbians are only mentioned once). Ideas include prayer, cutting off contact with homosexual friends, dating women and marriage, and scripture reading. He calls homosexuality a "despicable", "degraded", "dread practice", and a "perversion" that would "doom the world" while labeling the person a "generally lonely and sensitive" "deviate" and "afflicted one". The guide notes that Kimball and Mark E. Petersen were designated as the church specialists on homosexuality, and that homosexuality is not "totally" the fault of "family conditions" and concludes it "CAN be cured if the battle is well organized and pursued vigorously and continuously" (emphasis in the original).
- 1970 – The First Presidency under Joseph Fielding Smith sent a letter to stake presidents on March 19 which expressed concern over "the apparent increase in homosexuality and other deviations" and mentioned the 1959 assignment of apostles Kimball and Mark E. Petersen to help homosexuals. It was indicated that Kimball and Petersen would "send material and give counsel" as church specialists over "a program designed ... to counsel and direct [homosexuals] back to normalcy and happiness". A follow-up letter to leaders on December 23 asked them to "ask direct questions" about homosexuality when conducting pre-mission interviews. Within eight years they had counseled over one thousand individuals.
- 1970 – Victor L. Brown of the Presiding Bishopric gave a General Conference address in which he stated that a "normal" and "healthy" 12- or 13-year-old boy or girl could "develop into a homosexual" if "exposed to pornographic literature" and "abnormalities". He explains that exposure to the material would "crystallize and settle their habits for the rest of their lives", while calling recent media reporting on a same-sex marriage "filth on our newsstands".

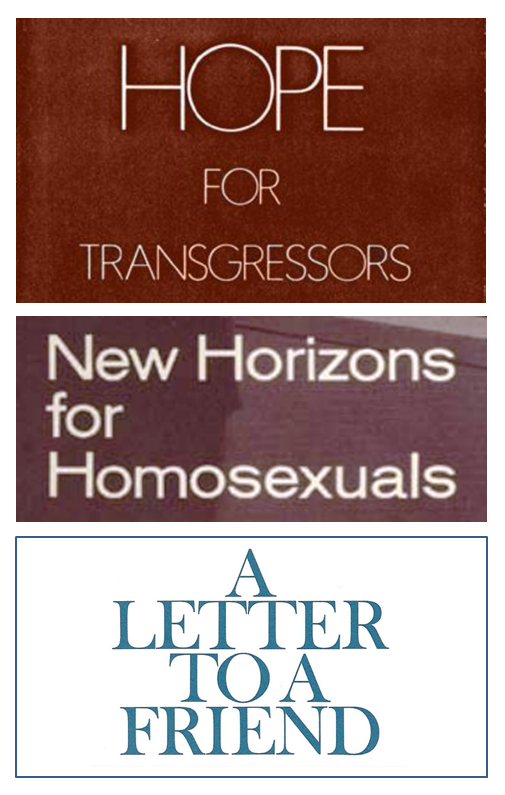
Booklet revisions of Kimball's influential '70s discourse on homosexuality (from the top: '70, '71, '78).

- 1971 – The church published a 34-page letter from Kimball to homosexual men titled New Horizons for Homosexuals. In it Kimball called homosexuality "a ruinous practice of perversion" that the church "will never condone" that begins with "curiosity" and "an unholy practice" like "an octopus with numerous tentacles to drag [the person] down to [their] tragedy". He states that saying "perverts are ... born 'that way'" is a "base lie" since homosexuality is "curable" and "can be overcome" and "recover[ed]" from. The letter asserts "God made no man a pervert" or "evil" and that "[t]o blame a weakness ... upon God is cowardly." It also calls homosexuality "ugly", "degenerate", "unnatural", "vicious", "base", a "waste of power", a "deep sin", and "an end to the family and ... civilization". The publication advises for the homosexual to recover they must "shun" anyone "associated with the transgression" and pray and read the scriptures.
- 1971 – In general conference presiding bishopric counselor Victor L. Brown stated that God created masculine and feminine traits, and if gendered appearance and behavioral traits are ignored, it can lead to the "reprehensible, tragic sin of homosexuality".

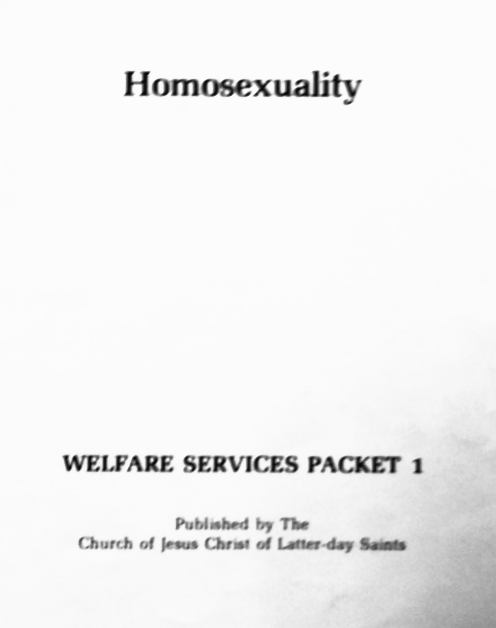
A 1973 church publication which taught that a passive father and domineering mother can cause homosexuality and that conforming to gender norms will change it.

- 1973 – The church published its first leaders guide on homosexuality for bishops and stake presidents titled "Homosexuality: Welfare Services Packet 1". It posited that "homosexual behavior" begins by being "molested" while also stating "not all who are molested become homosexual". Additionally, it said homosexuality was a learned behavior and not inborn, and that members should flee from other gays. It also suggested that homosexuality is caused by "a domineering mother and a passive father" and that "misunderstandings of sexuality among LDS people can contribute to homosexuality." As far as changing the sexual orientation of the person, the packet says that the lesbian "needs to learn feminine behavior", and the gay man "must be introduced to and learn the heterosexual or 'straight' way of life ... and what a manly priesthood leader and father does". The guide was written by BYU psychology professor Allen Bergin and LDS Social Services Personal Welfare director Victor L. Brown Jr. (the son of Presiding Bishop Victor L. Brown).

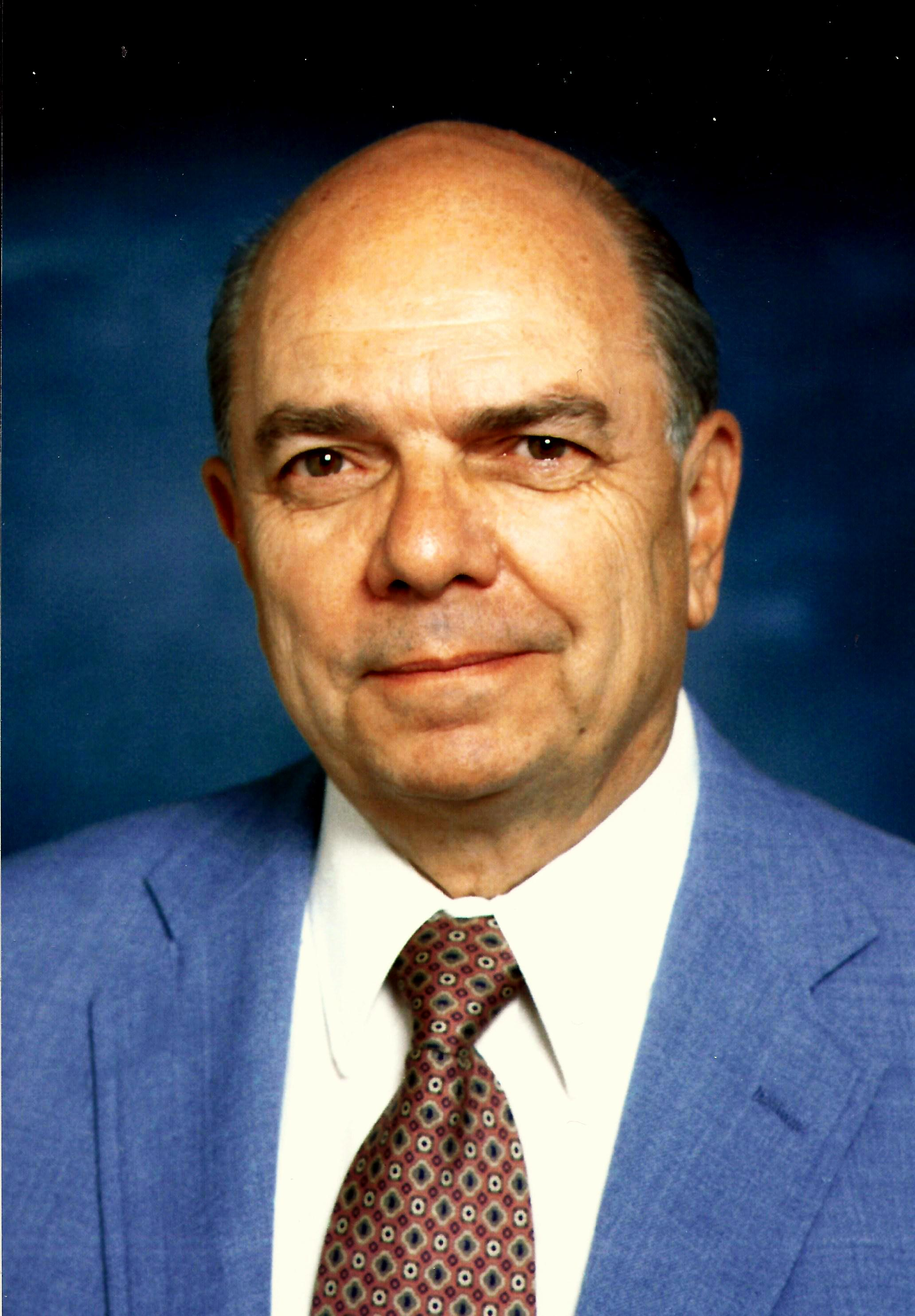
Mormon psychologist Allen Bergin's publications were influential in shaping Mormon thought on homosexuality.

- 1973 – The July issue of the magazine the New Era contained an article by BYU psychology professor Allen Bergin on agency. The article portrays some homosexuals as "psychologically disturbed persons" who are "compulsively driven to frequent and sometimes bizarre acts". He cites two clients with "compulsive or uncontrollable homosexuality" caused by intense fear for the opposite sex, a lack of social skills for normal male-female relationships, and seeking security exclusively from the same sex. Bergin discusses the behaviorist sexual orientation change efforts he used to treat these individuals.
- 1974 – The church's July edition of the Ensign magazine published the article "I Have a Question", in which a Mormon medical doctor states that homosexuals have "chosen this way of life" but "can be helped". Dr. Lindsay M. Curtis continues saying that "homosexuals and lesbians seldom are happy people" and their relationships are "unnatural", full of "emotional problems" and "promiscuity", and lacking in "fidelity, trust, or loyalty". Additionally, they try to recruit "others into their practice ... in their tender, impressionable years".
- 1974 – Kimball gave his October "God Will Not be Mocked" speech at general conference as the church's president in which he again stated that masturbation leads to homosexuality. He also said "[e]very form of homosexuality is sin. Pornography is one of the approaches to that transgression."

=== Late 1970s ===
- 1975 – The First Presidency sent a letter on May 30 to church leaders about the "unfortunate problem of homosexuality" encouraging them to not label people as homosexual because it makes the seem beyond solving to "conquer the habit".
- 1975 – The Ensign published an article by Presiding bishop Victor L. Brown which addressed parents stating that the "lack of proper affection in the home can result in unnatural behavior in their children such as homosexuality."

Members of LDS Social Services (renamed in '95 then again in 2019) were tasked with treating homosexual Mormons in 1972 and produced several important publications on homosexuality in '73, '95, and '99.

- 1975 – Robert Blattner of LDS Social Services (which had been tasked by the church to treat homosexual members since 1972) gave an address at the Association of Mormon Counselors and Psychotherapists (AMCAP) annual conference. Blattner served as a special assistant to the LDS Commissioner of Personal Welfare Victor Brown Jr. In the address Blattner states that the causes of homosexuality in men are a "disturbed family background" of an "absent father" and "usually" a "controlling mother" and a "lack of relationship with peers", while for women he only says "we don't have much information". He also says homosexual behavior and alcoholism are similar. He is asked what "the church's feelings are about electric shock ... behavior modification" and answered the church had "never made a statement on it" but that "most people coming to us can be helped by it" in reference to aversion therapy research happening at BYU.
- 1975 – LDS psychologist Robert D. Card presented his research on changing sexual attractions on Mormon men and women using shock aversion and hypnosis techniques at the AMCAP conference. The goal of his treatment was eliminating same-sex sexual behavior and having his clients enter an opposite-sex marriage as was common among the Mormon approach to homosexual individuals before the 80s. Card was a prominent proponent of aversion therapy and held a patent on the penile plethysmograph for measuring male sexual arousal to determine when to administer vomit-inducing drugs or electric shocks while showing his clients gay pornography. He had clients referred to him by Utah judges and bishops.
- 1976 – A version of the Church Handbook was released changing the 1968 reading of "homo-sexual acts" being grounds for a church court to "moral transgression" like "homosexuality". This change seemed to make Mormons vulnerable to church punishment for having a homosexual orientation alone even without sexual activity. From 1976 until 1989 under president Kimball the Church Handbook continued to call for church discipline for members attracted to the same sex even if they were celibate, equating merely being homosexual with the seriousness of acts of adultery and child molestation.
- 1976 – Apostle Packer gave the sermon "To Young Men Only" in the priesthood session of general conference. The sermon counseled against the "perversion" and "wicked practices" of men "handling one another" and having physical "contact ... in unusual ways". He asserted that it is a "malicious and destructive lie" that "some are born with an attraction to their own kind". The sermon was published as a pamphlet by the church from 1980 to 2016.
- 1977 – In the April general conference presiding bishopric member J. Richard Clarke told a story of a young man who claimed to have "developed into a homosexual" as part of attention-seeking rebellion against his distant father. In the address homosexuality was called a "vitiating disease" and "prison".

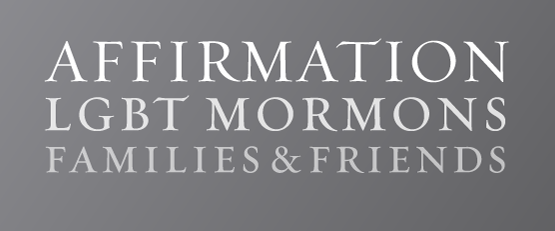
Affirmation's logo

- 1977 – Under the name Affirmation: Gay Mormons United, the first Affirmation group was organized on 11 June in Salt Lake City by Stephan Zakharias (formerly Stephen James Matthew Prince) and a group of other Mormon and former-Mormon gays and lesbians at the conference for the Salt Lake Coalition for Human Rights. Stephan organized the group in response to the suicides of two BYU friends who had undergone shock aversion therapy on the campus.
- 1977 – Deseret News editorials were sent to top church leaders for approval before publication. Within the span of two years after that first article Petersen penned five more Church News editorials discussing the origins of same-sex eroticism and its changeability. In January he wrote, "The homosexuals claim that God made them that way and hence are powerless to change, which is a complete fabrication and a deep delusion, for it was the Lord who provided the death penalty for these people in ancient times." In December he stated, "Since homosexuals ... have come out of hiding ... many of them claim that they are what they are because they were born that way and cannot help it. How ridiculous is such a claim. It was not God who made them that way, any more than He made bank robbers the way they are."
- 1977 – At a backstage press conference Church president Kimball praised Anita Bryant's anti-gay "Save Our Children" crusade which sought to bar the passing of nondiscrimination laws which would protect sexual minorities from being kicked out of their homes, fired from their jobs, and banned from restaurants solely for their sexual orientation. He stated that she was "doing a great service." He continued stating that "the homosexual program is not a natural, normal way of life" and that church bishops and college-educated church counselors can provide experienced aid to those with "homosexual problems."

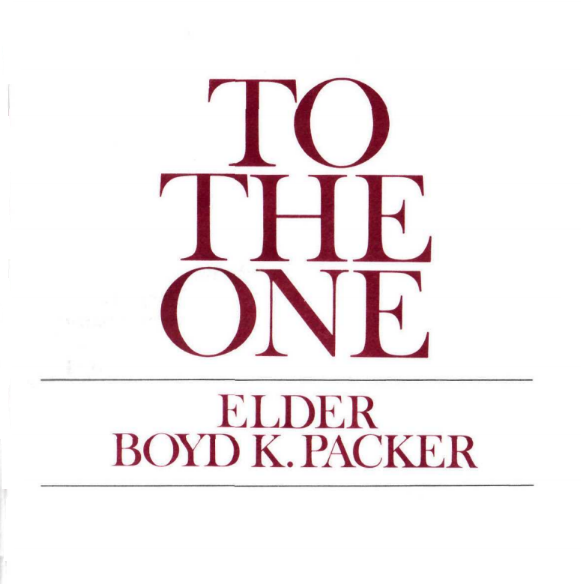
Cover to the pamphlet containing apostle Boyd K. Packer's 1978 BYU speech on homosexuality.

- 1978 – Packer delivered a sermon at BYU on March 5 which went on to be published by the church as a pamphlet called "To The One." Packer characterized homosexual activity as a perversion and posited that it had its roots in selfishness and stated that gay feelings could be "cured" with "unselfish thoughts, with unselfish acts". He further stated that the church had not previously talked more about homosexuality because "we can very foolishly cause things we are trying to prevent by talking too much about them".
- 1978 – Church president Spencer W. Kimball stated in the April conference that without the restraints of family life and real religion there would be an "avalanche of appetites" leading to an increase in homosexuality.
- 1978 – San Francisco PBS station KQED funded and aired a 16-minute documentary by Andrew Welch featuring interviews of gay Mormons in Salt Lake City and Provo and BYU psychologists administering the electroshock aversion therapy program in attempt to make gay students straight. It aired on PBS stations in Boston, New York City, and Los Angeles, and was the subject of controversy in Utah as KUED general manager Robert Reed refused to air it in July 1978. Additionally, BYU's KBYU refused to air the documentary after Reverend Bob Waldrop of the Salt Lake Metropolitan Community Church petitioned to have it aired in response to the recent of showing of Packer's "To the One" speech on homosexuality.
- 1978 – In a Church News article apostle Mark Petersen stated that "it was not God who made [homosexuals] that way" since "He gave all mankind free agency."
- 1979 – The LDS Welfare Services Department offered a video-recorded, several-day training seminar to LDS Social Services employees on "homosexual therapies".
- 1979 – LDS psychologist Ed D. Lauritsen presented a paper written under the direction of BYU's Values Institute to LDS Social Services which stated that a nurturing father "almost always serves as a form of psychological immunization against homosexuality in most cases" and that by improving his relationship with his children a father will "reduce the possibility of homosexuality among his children". He also stated that all LDS clinicians have a duty to "labor for the prevention of homosexuality."
- 1979 – In a BYU devotional church seventy Vaughn Featherstone stated "the homosexual cannot be exalted" and that homosexual members envy "normal" members of the church while hiding their perversion and falsely believing it's not their fault they're gay and that God made them different.
- 1979 – BYU's newspaper published a series of articles in April quoting church leaders and gay BYU students on homosexuality. A BYU counselor estimated that 4% of BYU students (or around 1,200 students) were homosexual and commissioner of LDS Social Services Harold Brown stated that homosexuality is not biological or inborn, and that church leaders just want to help them overcome their problem. LDS Social Services Personal Welfare director Victor Brown Jr. compared it to an alcoholic's addiction that can be cured.

=== Early 1980s ===
- 1980 – Kimball addressed homosexuality in the October General Conference asserting that "[s]ometimes masturbation is the introduction to the more serious ... sin of homosexuality."
- 1981 – Church leaders sent every bishop and stake president a copy of a book on human sexuality and families by Church Welfare Services director Victor Brown Jr. The book stated that it was disturbing that renowned sexologists had stated that bisexual individuals were privileged for not experiencing sexual prejudice and that they pointed the way for society at large. Brown further stated that equating same-sex relationships with opposite-sex marriage was fallacious and inconsistent and that homosexual people were less disciplined and orderly in their relationships than heterosexuals.
- 1981 – The church issued a guide for LDS Social Services employees called Understanding and Changing Homosexual Orientation Problems, instructing them that because of agency it is "inconsistent" to think that a "homosexual orientation is inborn or locked in, and there is no real hope of change," and that "the homosexually oriented man ... does not fully understand how a masculine man is supposed to think and act." The guide further states that the homosexual's "thoughts of the opposite sex are often fearful or threatening."

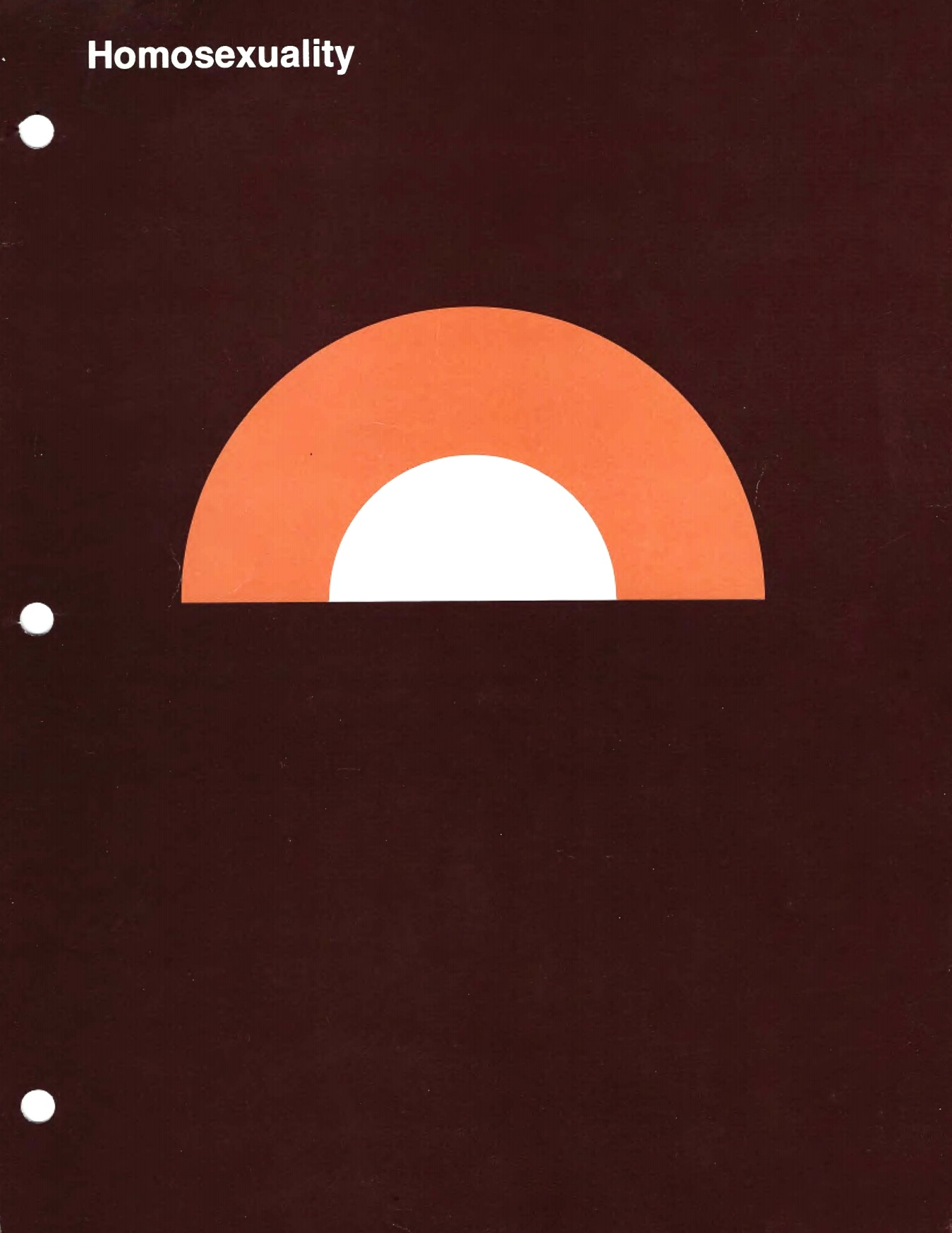
A 1981 manual for local leaders which taught homosexuality wasn't inborn, but caused by masturbation or an unhealthy childhood, and was changeable through praying, and heterosexual dating.

- 1981 – The First Presidency and Twelve Apostles also issued a guide for church leaders simply called "Homosexuality" which stated "modern-day prophets have clearly promised that homosexuality can be changed", and that it was "inconceivable that ... [the Lord] would permit ... his children to be born with [homosexual] desires and inclinations". It advised "full rehabilitation" could take 1 to 3 years, and that being "cured" doesn't mean "the old thoughts never return". The booklet gave guidelines for "treatment and prevention of homosexuality" and "lesbianism". It taught that homosexual behavior is learned and influenced by "unhealthy emotional development in early childhood", a "disturbed family background, "poor relationships with peers", "unhealthy sexual attitudes", and "early homosexual experiments". "Early masturbation experiences" were also cited as reinforcing "homosexual interests". Church leaders recommended the leader encourage the member to disclose the names of sexual partners, to read The Miracle of Forgiveness and "To the One", to begin dating, and to pray in order to help change their sexual orientation.
- 1981 – Church Welfare Services director Victor Brown Jr. published an article in the Association of Mormon Counselors and Psychotherapists journal which outlined his theory on how men become gay stating that "homosexuality is learned not inherent" and caused by "parent-child disturbances, gender and role distortion, relationship skill deficits", "masturbatory fantasy", "a severe realization of being different", and then a merging of the "person and [homosexual] role".
- 1981 – In General Conference, church Seventy Hartman Rector Jr. gave a speech in which he stated the earth would be wasted if Jesus returns and "finds nothing but birth control, sterilization, and homosexuals." He added, "If children have a happy family experience they will not want to be homosexual." Rector also stated he was "sure" that homosexuality "is an acquired addiction, just as drugs, alcohol and pornography are." He also stated "I do not believe" that homosexuals "were born that way" because "[t]here are no female spirits trapped in male bodies and vice versa."
- 1981 – A march of about 15 gay post-Mormons calling themselves "Ethyl and Friends for Gay Rights" was given city permission to protest on public property around Temple Square during the church's general conference with signs like "We are God’s Children." The leader Randy Smith (whose drag performance name was Ethel) had previously undergone electroshock aversion therapy at BYU.
- 1982 – Apostle Ezra Benson stated in general conference that homosexuality was one of the most obvious great problems in our society and caused by failure in the home.
- 1984 – Church seventy Richard G. Scott gave a discourse in which he says sexual "stimulation can lead to acts of homosexuality, and [those] are evil and absolutely wrong".

=== Late 1980s ===
- 1986 – BYU published a study by BYU professor and area Church Welfare Services director Victor Brown Jr. stating that people can eliminate homosexual feelings.
- 1986 – Church seventy Theodore Burton stated in a BYU-wide address that pornography is a selfish indulgence that leads to homosexuality.
- 1986 – The New York Times published an article on AIDS in Utah citing the strong influence that Mormon teachings have on the state since 65% of the population were Mormon. The article stated that church members identified as homosexual were directed by the church to marry and that they faced great pressure not to acknowledge their gay feelings often leading to double lives. It further stated that since 1983, 47 Utahns had been diagnosed with AIDS and 24 had died. Several gay Mormon men were quoted saying that they had faced church pressure to marry with the belief that marriage would "cure" their feelings.
- 1986 – An article for parents appeared in the Ensign reaffirming that "sometimes masturbation is the introduction to ... the gross sin of homosexuality" which "is a perversion of the Lord’s designated roles of men and women".

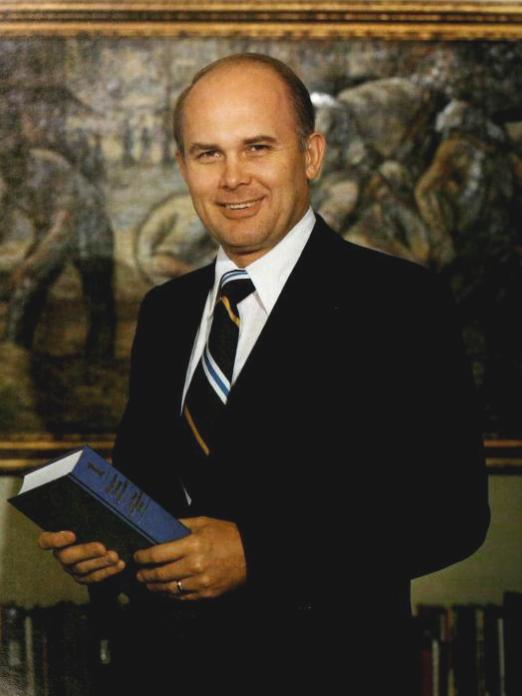
Apostle Oaks has been an influential figure in church interactions with homosexual people, instituting a system of surveillance to identify and expel or attempt to "cure" homosexual students as president of BYU in the '70s, and doing numerous important video interviews and articles on the topic in the '80s, '90s, and 2000s.

- 1986 – Dallin H. Oaks commented in a December 30 CBS-TV interview that "marriage is not doctrinal therapy for homosexual relations" and that "he did not know whether individual leaders have given such advice."
- 1987 – Gordon B. Hinckley of the First Presidency gave a conference address in which he stated, "homosexual relations ... are grievous sins." He continued by saying "marriage between a man and a woman is ordained of God .... Marriage should not be viewed as a therapeutic step to solve problems such as homosexual inclinations or practices, which first should clearly be overcome with a firm and fixed determination never to slip to such practices again."
- 1987 – Seventy Theodore M. Burton implied a link between a "selfish indulgence" in pornography and homosexuality in his address to BYU on June 3.
- 1988 – The Ensign featured an article from BYU psychologist Allen Bergin in which he stated that homosexuality was "caused by some combination of biology and environment".
- 1989 – The Church Handbook was updated to and signalled a small softening by switching focus from the attractions themselves to actions. It additionally stated that a church court is required for any "homosexual relations" committed by a member while holding a "prominent church position" such as a bishop
- 1989 – Evergreen International was founded to help Mormons who want to "diminish same-sex attractions and overcome homosexual behavior".

=== Early 1990s ===
The 1990 edition of the "For the Strength of Youth" pamphlet called homosexuality an abomination.

- 1990 – The church published a version of the "For the Strength of Youth" pamphlet which contained its first explicit mention of homosexuality. The pamphlet was to be put "in the hands of every young person in each ward". In this pamphlet's eighth version section on "Sexual Purity" it stated "unnatural affections ... toward persons of the same gender are counter to God's eternal plan".
- 1990 – The church distributed the booklet "Keys to Understanding Homosexuality" to its LDS Social Services employees which contained twenty-five suggestions to help male homosexual clients such as discouraging them from coming out of the closet, increasing their hope for changing their attractions, and helping them dress and act heterosexual.
- 1990 – The first Utah pride march occurred. It was organized by Connell O'Donovan who attended LDS seminary as a teen, and underwent hypnosis therapy in attempts to change his attractions to men as recommended by his church leaders. The marchers went right past the Salt Lake temple and the event complemented the annual Utah Gay and Lesbian Pride Day Festival that had been held since 1986. During next year's march participants were met with neo-nazi protesters at the Salt Lake City and County building.
- 1991 – The First Presidency sent a letter on November 14 to be read in all congregations stating "homosexual and lesbian behavior is sinful" and that homosexual "thoughts and feelings, regardless of their causes, can and should be overcome" by "sincere repentance", "persistent effort", "the help of others", and "counsel from their bishop". The letter made a distinction "between immoral thoughts and feelings and participating in ... any homosexual behavior", and calls for "love and understanding" for those "struggling" to "overcom[e] inappropriate thoughts and feelings".

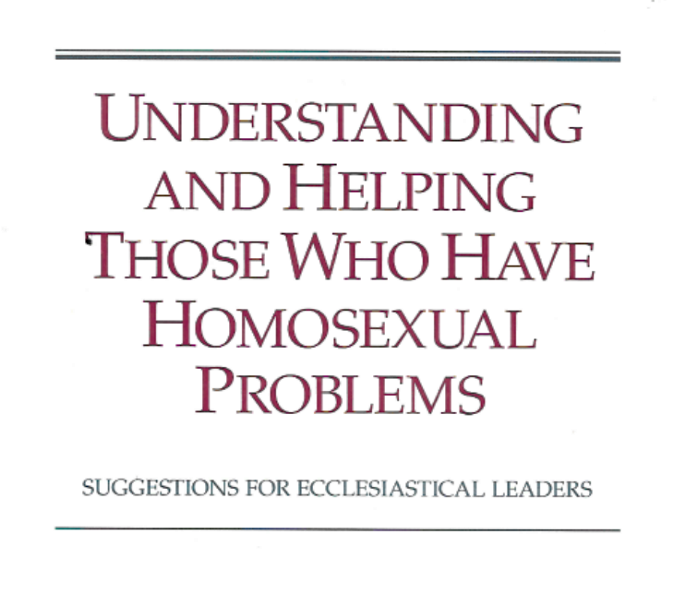
Cover of a 1992 manual which marked a shift in LDS church rhetoric towards changing homosexual behavior rather than feelings.

- 1992 – The church published "Understanding and Helping Those Who Have Homosexual Problems" as a guide for ecclesiastical leaders. The six-page booklet states, "There is a distinction between immoral thoughts and feelings and participating in ... homosexual behavior. However, such thoughts and feelings, regardless of their causes can and should be overcome and sinful behavior should be eliminated." It further advised, "members can overcome these problems by turning to the Lord." "In some cases, heterosexual feelings emerge leading to happy, eternal marriage relationships." The pamphlet did not frame homosexuality as a disease corresponding to the recent change by the World Health Organization removing homosexuality as a mental disorder. However, it continued to deny any biological origins stating "there is no conclusive evidence that anyone is born with a homosexual orientation."
- 1993 – A poll of over 400 BYU students found that 41% believed the church only accepted same-sex oriented individuals as long as they changed their sexual orientation and 10% believed the church would excommunicate them regardless of sexual behavior.

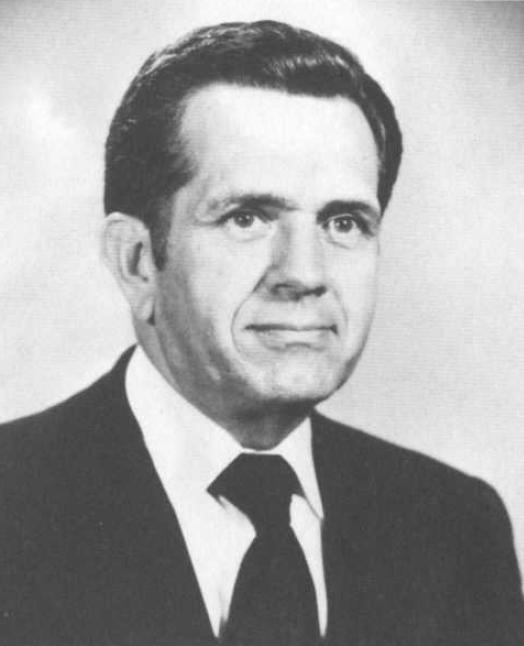
Apostle Boyd K. Packer played a large role in shaping over three decades of teachings on homosexuality through numerous speeches containing the subject.

- 1993 – Packer gave his May 18 "Talk to the All-Church Coordinating Council" (composed of the First Presidency, the Quorum of the Twelve, and the Presiding Bishopric). In it Packer stated that a man who self-identifies as a homosexual has "gender disorientation".
- 1993 – Church Seventy Spencer J. Condie related a story of a homosexual man's conversion in his October General Conference talk. Condie calls homosexuality an unclean "addictive behavior" that the man in the story developed "gradually" after being "introduced" to it "in his early youth" after which he had "relationships" which brought him "misery". Later the man read the Book of Mormon, experienced a "mighty change of heart", and was baptized, and was able to overcome his "homosexual tendencies" and marry a woman.
- 1993 – BYU faculty reported that church leaders supported church-employed counselors in using a reparative therapy approach which assumed homosexuality could change.
- 1994 – Disciples2, a confidential online and email support group, was founded. It operated from 1994 to about 2013 for male and female "strugglers" striving to follow church teachings.
- 1994 – The church's publishing company published Laurie Campbell's "Born That Way?" under a pen name on her leaving a relationship with a woman and marrying a man.
- 1994 – Apostle Richard G. Scott gave a conference address restating a part of Spencer W. Kimball's October 1980 conference talk by saying that "stimulation" or masturbation can lead to "acts of homosexuality".
- 1994 – Apostle James E. Faust gave a speech at BYU in which he stated that homosexuality is not biological or inborn and that same-sex marriage would unravel families, the fabric of human society.
- Mid-1990s – Gay Mormon Josh Weed went through reparative therapy administered by Family Services.
- Mid-1990s – BYU's on-campus electroshock aversion therapy program which had begun in 1959 ended over three decades later in the mid-1990s.

=== Late 1990s ===
- 1995 – The church's Family Services published the manual "Understanding and Helping Individuals with Homosexual Problems" advising practitioners how to prevent and treat homosexuality saying, "There is sufficient scientific research and clinical evidence to conclude that homosexuality is treatable and preventable." The guide states that male homosexuality is caused by "the motivation to repair the loss of the father-son relationship creat[ing] sexualized father-hunger or reparative drive", and that "in the homosexual male this core gender identity has become confused". The manual cites "the roots of lesbianism" as "a dysfunctional family relationship" and/or "physical, sexual and emotional abuse" which causes women to "have a tendency to develop overly dependent or enmeshed emotional relationships". The guide further states that the "love between homosexuals is pseudo-love".
- 1995 – The church's newspaper published an article by BYU professor Daniel Judd in which he stated that the power of Christ freed a man from his problem of homosexuality.
- 1995 – James E. Faust gave a First Presidency member message in the September Ensign in which he denies any biological or "inherited" components in the etiology of homosexuality citing "no scientific evidence" supporting the "false belief of inborn homosexual orientation" leading to "so-called alternative lifestyles". He continued that if there was an inherited or inborn aspect to homosexuality it would "frustrate the whole plan of mortal happiness" and deny "the opportunity to change" leading to "discouragement, disappointment, and despair". The article also stated that same-sex relationships would also help "unravel the fabric of human society" and if practiced by everyone would "mean the end of the human family".
- 1995 – The church published an article by apostle Dallin H. Oaks in the October edition of the monthly Ensign magazine. in which Oaks states "we insist that erotic feelings toward a person of the same sex are irregular". He also seems to contradict Faust's address from a month earlier by giving a nuanced view on potential biological components of the etiology of homosexuality stating "some kinds of feelings seem to be inborn" while others "seem to be acquired from a complex interaction of 'nature and nurture,". He continues, "the feelings ... that increase susceptibility to certain behavior may have some relationship to inheritance". However, Oaks discourages members from calling themselves or other people lesbian or gay saying, "we should refrain from using [gay and lesbian] as nouns to identify specific persons. Our religious doctrine dictates this usage. It is wrong to use these words to denote a condition."
- 1996 – In a 1996 and 1997 presentation psychiatrist Jeffery Jensen criticized church reparative therapy efforts as lacking scientific integrity, saying gay men and lesbians cannot be made heterosexual. He also stated "far too many of our lesbian and gay youths kill themselves because of what you say about them," and "those who believe your false promises and remain celibate in the hopes of eventual 'cure' are consigned to a misery."
- 1997 – Issue of the church's Ensign magazine contained an anonymously authored article "Becoming Whole Again". In it the author who was married to a woman discussed his struggle with "same-gender attraction" calling it a "trial", "weakness", "impure thought", "temptation", and "misguided feeling" caused by "longing for true brotherly love or a desire for masculine characteristics". At the end the author states "same-gender attraction can be successfully resisted and overcome".
- 1997 – The church Seventy Jay E. Jensen told a reporter that the LDS Church "accepts gays on one condition: that they renounce their sexual orientation" and offers gay people help and support that will point them to happiness. He had presented at the September Evergreen International conference two months before.
- Late 90s – National Geographic journalist Andrew Evans was required to undergo conversion therapy in order to continue as a student at an LDS school.
- 1998 – The Church Handbook was updated with first church handbook policies sections on homosexuality stating if members have "homosexual thoughts or feelings or engage in homosexual actions" they should be helped to understand faith, repentance, life's purpose, and should be helped to "accept responsibility for their thoughts".
- 1998 – Church president Gordon B. Hinckley gave a general conference sermon and said "so-called gays and lesbians" have "certain inclinations which are powerful and which may be difficult to control". He continued "We want to help these people ... with their problems ... and difficulties", as well as stating "we love them" but made it clear that the church could not support "so-called same-sex marriage".
- 1998 – Church leaders discouraged participation in therapy groups that "challenge religious and moral values," "foster physical contact among participants," or "encourage open confession or disclosure of personal information normally discussed only in confidential settings." The handbook also explained that "although participants may experience temporary emotional relief or exhilaration, old problems often return, leading to added disappointment and despair."
- 1998 – The church's Ensign magazine published an article by Family Services assistant commissioner A. Dean Byrd who also served on the Evergreen Board of Trustees. Byrd posited that "homosexuality is not innate and unchangeable", but is caused by "temperament, personality traits, sexual abuse, familial factors, and treatment by one’s peers". He further asserted that individuals can "diminish homosexual attraction" and that "when homosexual difficulties have been fully resolved, heterosexual feelings can emerge". In support of this he stated "many individuals who have experienced homosexual difficulties have" had their "burdens" or "trial" "lifted through the Lord’s grace." The article continued acknowledging that those who desire to diminish their "homosexual urgings" may "experience extreme pain because of the extensive changes that are required" including "changing one’s thoughts ... friendships ... or even clothing styles".
- 1998 – Church president Hinckley stated in general conference that, "we love and honor" and "our hearts reach out to ... gays and lesbians" and "they are welcome in the church".
- 1999 – The American Psychiatric Association disavowed therapy trying to change sexual orientation as ineffective and destructive.
- 1999 – A study by church employees of the effects of Nicolosi-influenced reparative therapy on six Mormon individuals with homosexual feelings, was printed in a church university journal stating that "change from same-sex to opposite-sex attraction is possible."
- 1999 – The church publishes an article in its Ensign on the effectiveness of changing sexual orientation through therapy. The article, written by BYU professor and Evergreen Board of Trustees member Dean Byrd, posited that "homosexuality is not innate and unchangeable", but is caused by "temperament, personality traits, sexual abuse, familial factors, and treatment by one’s peers." The church article further asserted that individuals can "diminish homosexual attraction" and that "when homosexual difficulties have been fully resolved, heterosexual feelings can emerge." In support of this Byrd stated "many individuals who have experienced homosexual difficulties have" had their "burdens" or "trial" "lifted through the Lord’s grace." The article continued acknowledging that those who desire to diminish their "homosexual urgings" may "experience extreme pain because of the extensive changes that are required" including "changing one’s thoughts ... friendships ... or even clothing styles."
- 1999 – A PBS documentary on the intersection between the Utah Mormon community and homosexuality titled "Friends and Family: A Community Divided" aired on Utah's public television. It featured interviews from LDS Family Fellowship leaders and their gay son and lesbian daughter, LDS bishop and Evergreen International director David Pruden, a lesbian active Mormon, and a gay active Mormon man married to a woman.

=== Early 2000s ===
- 2000 – 32-year-old Stuart Matis, a gay latter-day saint active in the church, died by suicide on 25 February 2000 on the steps of a California church stake center building where the apostle Jeffrey Holland was scheduled to speak that day. His death came during the height of the LDS Church's fight to ban same-sex marriage in California with Proposition 22, also known as Knight's Initiative. Right before his death he wrote a note stating, "Several decades ago it was church policy to advocate marriage as a cure for one's homosexuality. This inevitably resulted in many broken marriages and families. The Church also postulated that men became gay because of a doting mother and an absent father. This inevitably cast blame on grieving parents. ... The church has no idea that ... there are surely boys and girls on their callused hands and knees imploring God to free them of their pain. They hate themselves ... God never intended me to be straight. Hopefully, my death might be a catalyst for some good."

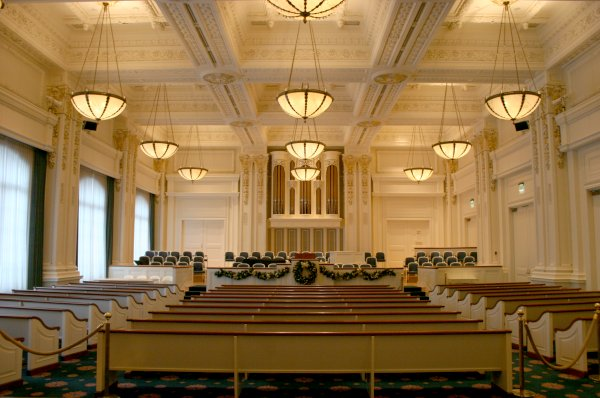
The Joseph Smith Memorial Building chapel at Temple Square where many Evergreen conferences were held.

- 2000 – Alexander B. Morrison, of the First Quorum of the Seventy, and Robert L. Millet, Dean of BYU Religion Education, addressed members of Evergreen International at its 10th annual conference, which was held in the church's Joseph Smith Memorial Building. In Morrison's address he stated that through Christ "all inappropriate inclinations or orientations [can be] transformed in this life" or "resist[ed]".
- 2000 – Boyd K. Packer gave his October General Conference address in which he said homosexuality begins as an "innocent curiosity" which leads to a "pattern" leading to an "addiction". He said the idea that "God created them with overpowering, unnatural desires" is "not true" stating that "He can cure and He can heal".
- 2000 – LDS Family Services surveyed 381 of their clients who were homosexual and wanted to change their attractions, and 71% reported significant progress in their sexual orientation change therapy.
- 2001 – Dean Byrd a director of LDS Family Services published a book entirely on homosexuality and the church stating that "the Church repeatedly, in nearly every statement about homosexual relations, teaches that homosexual attraction is not inherent to a particular genetic make-up and that they are quite able to change."
- 2001 – Sharon G. Larsen of the Young Women General Presidency addressed the 11th Annual Evergreen Conference in the Joseph Smith Memorial Building. In her talk she stated those who "struggle with same-gender attraction" who "despite persistent effort cannot overcome that attraction and marry someone" of the opposite gender "must remain celibate".
- 2001 – At BYU's Family Under Fire Conference, Family Services director Jerry Harris gave some "steps to recovery" from homosexuality for gay people to use.
- 2001 – Confessions of a Mormon Boy by Steven Fales opened (later becoming an off Broadway show) which depicted the author's efforts futile efforts to "overcome" his attractions through extensive church-sponsored anti-gay therapy and later six years of marriage to a woman and two children.
- 2002 – Singer Justin Utley began two years of conversion therapy through the Evergreen leaving him depressed and suicidal after his experience. He reported that in group therapy sessions participants practiced "healthy male touch" in order to reduce their attractions, and his therapist recommended to him by the group told him his attractions were caused by being molested as a kid and he had repressed those memories. Later, Utley dated a man for a few months but he died suddenly, purportedly from a heart attack, but Utley believed it was by suicide. Devastated, he went to his bishop who told him his love interest was taken from him by God because they weren't supposed to be homosexual.
- 2002 – The church's Ensign magazine published an anonymously authored article by an LDS woman attracted to other women. The author gave advice for how "to overcome this challenge" including advising against "attach[ing] labels to yourself or others who struggle with this problem" since these temptations "do not define who we are". She also recommended a person "quit [their] job" if necessary to "avoid places frequented by those who are involved in this lifestyle".
- 2002 – Several notable Mormon leaders including James O. Mason, Joe J. Christensen, and Ardeth G. Kapp founded the Mental Health Resource Foundation (also initially called the Hidden Treasures Foundation) as a resource for Mormon leaders and members. The website was advertised in church publications and contained never-before-published materials from Family Services and a guide on changing homosexual attractions called Helping Individuals Who Want to Diminish Same-Gender Desires And Stop Same-Gender Sexual Behavior.
- 2003 – After facing criticism from several organizations, KBYU and BYU-TV cancelled the planned broadcast of LDS therapists Jeff Robinson's presentation "Homosexuality: What Works and What Doesn't Work" given at BYU's 2002 Families Under Fire conference. The talk characterized homosexuality as a serious addiction that could be cured with enough motivation, and stated that gay men can develop a sexual attraction to women if they walk away from rather than focus or fight the dragon of their gayness.
- 2003 – Family Services counselor Jerry Harris presented at BYU's Families Under Fire conference on helping people overcome their homosexuality.
- 2004 – Jeff Robinson published interviews with seven Mormon men married to women who had been through conversion therapy and previously identified as gay. The seven men believed they had a spiritual transformation and that their orientation was changed. Robinson found that their change came from a new understanding that prior same-sex attractions did not require them to "be" gay.
- 2004 – Researchers published the experience of 50 Mormon men undergoing conversion therapy.
- 2004 – Michael Ferguson spent seven years undergoing conversion therapy beginning at the recommendation of his BYU bishop in 2004.
- 2004 – Los Angeles bishop Robert Rees stated in an academic presentation that of the 50 homosexual Mormons with whom he'd had a close relationship over the past two decades, not a single one "was able to change or alter his or her sexual orientation," and that he hadn't "met a single homosexual Latter-day Saint who had not tried valiantly, generally over a long period of time, to change his or her orientation."
- 2004 – The church's Ensign magazine published an anonymous article of a Mormon man struggling to curb and overcome his attractions to some other men.
- 2004 – Merrill J. Bateman in the Presidency of the Seventy gave an address at the 14th annual Evergreen Conference. He explained that for those "struggling with nature, with thoughts and feelings that are opposite from what the Church teaches" Jesus has the power to "assuage one's feelings".
- 2004 – Gordon B. Hinckley gave an interview in which he stated that gay people have a problem that the church wants to help them solve, though, he said he did not know if they were born with this problem.

=== Late 2000s ===
- 2005 – The Foundation for Attraction Research (FAR) was founded by LDS lawyer Dennis Dahle, BYU psychology professor Dean Byrd, and BYU social work professor Shirley Cox, with a board of directors also consisting of BYU English professor Doris Dant, BYU law professor William Duncan, BYU religion professor John Livinstone, and retired BYU psychology professor Gawain Wells. In 2009 the organization published Understanding Same-Sex Attraction which advocated therapy to change sexual attractions. In 2012 FAR co-hosted the Reconciling Faith and Feelings conference with the Association of Mormon Counselors and Psychotherapists (AMCAP).
- September – James O. Mason of the Second Quorum of the Seventy addressed members of Evergreen International at its 15th annual conference in the church's Joseph Smith Memorial Building. He stated, "Can individuals struggling with some same-gender attraction be cured? 'With God nothing should be impossible' (Luke 1:37) ... The right course of action remains the same: eliminate or diminish same sex attraction .... Feelings of attraction toward someone of the same gender should be eliminated if possible or controlled."
- 2005 – In a presentation at BYU's Families Under Fire Conference BYU professor Shirley Cox stated that homosexual attractions can be diminished and that the treatment of unwanted same-sex attraction has a history of being successful.
- 2005 – Jeffrey R. Holland and Marlin K. Jensen were interviewed in March with questions about various topics including homosexuality by PBS for a four-hour special called The Mormons. Holland stated "gay or lesbian inclinations" will be removed after death.
- 2005 – Apostle Oaks gave an October General Conference address in which he quotes a man saying "change is possible" but don't "focus on the causes of same-gender attraction". Oaks then continues explaining if "faith", "prayers" and "priesthood" don't "heal you from an affliction" that the "Atonement will surely give you the strength to bear the burden."
- 2006 – When asked the church's position on conversion therapy in 2006, Seventy Lance Wickman responded that it may be appropriate and the Church doesn't council against it. Oaks also stated that "[t]he Church rarely takes a position on which treatment techniques are appropriate." Wickman and Oaks cautioned against abusive practices, such as aversion therapy.
- 2007 – In the official church pamphlet "God Loveth His Children" leaders stated that "many Latter-day Saints, through individual effort, the exercise of faith, and reliance upon the enabling power of the Atonement, overcome same-gender attraction in mortality," and that "we still have the power to resist and reform our feelings (as needed) and to assure that they do not lead us to entertain inappropriate thoughts."
- 2007 – Church seventy Douglas Callister spoke at an Evergreen conference and urged listeners to battle their challenge of "same-gender inclinations" and thoughts through prayer, fasting, and taking the sacrament.
- 2007 – The church published an article by apostle Holland which stated, "Through the exercise of faith, individual effort, and reliance upon the power of the Atonement, some may overcome same-gender attraction in mortality and marry. ... We are all thrilled when some who struggle with these feelings are able to marry, raise children, and achieve family happiness."
- 2007 – The church's newspaper published anonymous stories of several homosexual Mormon men. One often pleaded with God to be straight and was suicidal, and another was promised by his stake president that if he married a woman and had sex that his attractions to men would "go away."
- 2008 – Apostles discussed the question of whether members should consider using "new drugs and gene therapy" to "counter homosexuality" in a leaked video.
- 2009 – The church produces a training video for Family Services entitled "Providing psychological care to those with unwanted homosexual attraction".
- 2009 – Bruce C. Hafen of the First Quorum of the Seventy addressed members of Evergreen International at its 19th annual conference, which was held in the church's Joseph Smith Memorial Building and stated, "If you are faithful, on resurrection morning—and maybe even before then—you will rise with normal attractions for the opposite sex. Some of you may wonder if that doctrine is too good to be true. But Elder Dallin H. Oaks has said it MUST be true" (emphasis in original).
- 2009 – A BYU website on LDS FAQ continued to cite a 1986 study stating that through the gospel of Jesus Christ and reparative therapy that homosexual people can "overcome" their sexual orientation through self-mastery by choosing proper role models, developing appropriate relationship skills, clarifying the importance of sexuality, and reassessing gender roles.
- 2009 – A book authored by mostly BYU professors states that homosexual attractions can be eradicated through therapy. The book continues to be sold in church-owned bookstores as of 2017.

=== Early 2010s ===
- 2010 – In a survey of 625 Utah individuals, 55% of Mormons believed sexual orientation could be changed.
- 2010 – In a special meeting for some Oakland, California members several gay Mormons spoke of years of prayer, fasting, Church-prescribed aversion therapy, and attempts at mixed-orientation marriages all promised by the church to 'cure' them. It was reported that church Seventy and historian Marlin K. Jensen apologized to straight and gay members for their pain from church actions around homosexuality.
- 2010 – Boyd K. Packer delivered an October conference address stating "some suppose that they were pre-set and cannot overcome what they feel are inborn tendencies toward the impure and unnatural. Not so! Why would our Heavenly Father do that to anyone? Remember, he is our father." His characterization of same-sex physical attractions as "impure and unnatural" tendencies that can be "overcome" sparked a protest of thousands of individuals on October 7 which surrounded Temple Square. Packer later altered his words in the print version of his speech to say "Some suppose that they were preset and cannot overcome what they feel are inborn temptations toward the impure and unnatural. Not so! Remember, God is our Heavenly Father".
- 2012 – An anonymously authored article was published on the church's website in which a man describes how through counseling with Family Services and local bishop he was able to manage his burden, or struggle, with same-sex attraction and marry a woman. He stated that he was blessed with an alleviation of the intensity of feelings and knows of some people whose burden was lifted and "overcame" same-sex attraction, and no longer experience those feelings.
- 2012 – Leaders explicitly stated that same-sex sexual attractions were not a choice.
- 2013 – Seventy Tad R. Callister stated in a speech at BYU-I reprinted in the Ensign that homosexual feelings are a weakness for which one must do all they can to use the refining power of the atonement to convert into a strength.
- 2014 – Evergreen International shuts down and transfers its resources to North Star.
- 2014 – The church sent a survey via email to young single adult members in Utah asking among other things about their sexual identity. The options were: "I am heterosexual, but I struggle with same-sex attraction; I am heterosexual and do not struggle with same-sex attraction; Other, please specify." The survey options were criticized as implying that homosexuality doesn't exist and LGBT individuals are straight people who "struggle" with a problem. The question was later changed.

=== Late 2010s ===
- 2015 – The TLC special My Husband's Not Gay aired on the 11th featuring LDS men attracted to men but dating or married to women. Church spokesperson Eric Hawkins stated in response to media questions that the Church "does not promote marriage as a treatment method for same-sex attraction".
- 2015 – A church spokesperson stated that Family Services no longer offers any sexual-orientation change efforts, but are willing to help clients reconcile their attractions and religious beliefs. He also stated that their neutral stance on independent SOCE programs like Journey Into Manhood should not be taken as an endorsement.
- 2015 – An event hosted by BYU-Idaho faculty member Michael Williamson on "overcoming" homosexuality through private therapy was scheduled to be held on the BYU-Idaho campus and was advertised during church meetings. The event was cancelled, however, after receiving negative press. At the time BYU-I publicly hosted a video of Williams discussing ways to "treat" same-sex attraction, though, it is now accessible to students only.
- 2015 – A survey of 1,612 LGBT Mormons and former Mormons found that 73% of men and 43% of women had attempted sexual orientation change, usually through multiple methods across many years.
- 2015 – Counselor-led sexual orientation change efforts dwindled among Mormons.
- 2015 – The church released Ministering Resources–Same-Sex Attraction for local leaders, which included the advice to "avoid offering overly simplified responses, such as the idea that ... missionary service will eliminate same-sex attraction."
- 2016 – The apostle Bednar answered a members question in a February 23 broadcast stating that "there are no homosexual members of the Church" since we are not defined by sexual attraction or behavior and "all of us have different challenges in the flesh". He compared homosexuality to a physical handicap like "being born with a body that is not fully functional".
- 2016 – Church spokesperson Eric Hawkins stated that the church "denounces any therapy that subjects an individual to abusive practices" and hopes LGBT Mormons "find compassion and understanding from family members, professional counselors and church members". The statement was in response to media inquiries around the experiences of a lesbian Mormon teen who beginning in 2010 was subjected to physically abusive conversion therapy techniques in an attempt to change her sexual orientation leading to a suicide attempt.

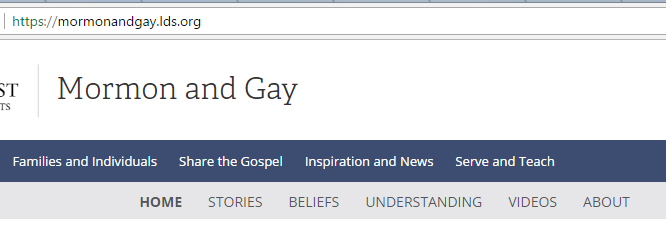
The 2016 website update contained the first church disavowal of all therapy focusing on changing sexual orientation.

- 2016 – An update to the church's official website stated in reference to conversion therapy or sexual orientation change efforts that "it is unethical to focus professional treatment on an assumption that a change in sexual orientation will or must occur," and that "a change in attraction should not be expected or demanded as an outcome by parents or leaders. The intensity of your attractions may not be in your control ...." The 2016 update still offered qualified statements that reparative therapy should be an option, and promised that orientation change could occur.
- 2016 – Former bishop Robert Rees stated in 2016 that he counseled many gay members who followed church leader promises about changing their sexual orientation via missions, temple attendance, and scripture reading, and when change didn't came they often blamed themselves for not being righteous enough and this led to many attempted and successful suicides.
- 2017 – Minutes from a February 2014 Layton, Utah meeting for stake leaders were released without authorization in which the apostle L. Tom Perry stated that gay young men need association with "manly things" and strong, vigorous men who know the power they hold. He also stated that he does not believe that people are born with attractions to those of the same sex, but that it's instead a temptation like any other.
- 2017 – The apostle Oaks told Kansas youth to not use sexual orientation labels on themselves, and that he has letters from people who stopped having gay feelings and married and had children.
- 2017 – One gay former Mormon reported his previous religiously motivated efforts to diminish his gay feelings through prayer.
- 2017 – The 1981 church guide on homosexuality that taught that masturbation made people gay received media attention.
- 2018 – A documentary on the AIDS crisis in Utah "Quiet Heroes" debuted at Utah's Sundance Film Festival. The film touched upon the effects the teachings and norms of the Mormon community played in the crisis including the effects that the state's religious monoculture had on furthering the marital spread of AIDS through closeted gay Mormon men who were pressured to marry women, but cheated on their spouse.
- 2018 – Family Services stated in the church's newspaper that they "do not provide what is commonly referred to as 'reparative therapy' or 'sexual orientation change efforts'" any more.
- 2019 – The church updated the Ministering Resources—Same-Sex Attraction page for leaders stating, "Avoid promising a reduction or elimination of same-sex attraction in exchange for faithfulness or missionary service."
- 2019 – David Matheson, a top proponent of "conversion therapy", stated that he is gay and is getting divorced to live his life as a gay man.
- 2019 – The church's 2016 tacit endorsement of conversion therapy was announced as overturned when a spokesperson for the church stated, "We are opposed to conversion therapy and our therapists do not practice it."

=== Early 2020s ===
- 2020 – After expressing neutrality on a 2019 bill in the Utah legislature to ban conversion therapy, the LDS church released an October statement in opposition to the ban. After months of back-and-forth between church leaders, the LGBTQ leaders, and state policy makers a compromise was reached banning licensed therapists from practicing conversion therapy on minors in Utah. The measure passed in January 2020 making Utah the 19th state to ban conversion therapy.
- 2020 – Utah State University published a master's thesis detailing the author's years of sexual orientation change efforts which began as a missionary in 2011 at the advice from his mission president who said his attractions were "an addiction" and that the author was "addicted to men". The church leader instructed him to use the church-run LDS Family Services Addiction Recovery Program to change his attractions.
