= Foundation for Attraction Research =

Foundation for Attraction Research (FAR)
- Formation: 2005
- Dissolved: 2014
- Type: Research Institute (homosexuality, religion, Latter-day Saints)
- Purpose: Developing resources and conducting research supportive of LDS teachings on homosexuality
- Headquarters: Lehi, Utah, US
- Founder: Dennis V. Dahle
- Founder: Shirley Cox
- Founder: A. Dean Byrd
- Parent organization: Brigham Young University
- Affiliations: The Church of Jesus Christ of Latter-day Saints
- Website: FoundationForAttractionResearch.org

The Foundation for Attraction Research (FAR) was a Utah-based research and publishing institute with the goal of providing literature and conducting research supportive of religious teachings of the Church of Jesus Christ of Latter-day Saints (LDS Church) on homosexuality, including asserting that sexual orientation change efforts were effective. One of the founders, A. Dean Byrd, was also in leadership of the National Association for Research & Therapy of Homosexuality (NARTH). FAR published a guidebook for therapists in 2009, and the LDS Church's counseling organization LDS Family Services held a conference based on the book in 2011. The book advised homosexual readers to seek reparative therapy through Evergreen International and LDS Family Services.

== History ==
FAR was founded in 2005 and run by mostly professors from the LDS Church's largest university, Brigham Young University (BYU). These included psychology professor Dean Byrd and social work professor Shirley Cox. The board of directors also consisted of BYU English professor Doris Dant, law professor William Duncan, religion professor John Livingstone, and retired psychology professor Gawain Wells. In 2009 the organization published Understanding Same-Sex Attraction through the LDS Church's publishing arm Deseret Book. It advocated therapy to change sexual attractions. In 2012 FAR co-hosted the Reconciling Faith and Feelings conference with the Association of Latter-day Saint Counselors and Psychotherapists (AMCAP).

== Publications ==
- Understanding Same-Sex Attraction: Where to Turn and How to Help (2009)

== See also ==
- Sexual orientation change efforts and the LDS Church
- Homosexuality and the LDS Church
- Gender minorities and the LDS Church
- BYU Values Institute
