= North Star (organization) =

Mormon LGBTQ organization

- North Star Saints
- Named after: The North Star
- Founded: 2006; 20 years ago
- Founders: Jay Jacobsen, John Gadd, Ty Mansfield, Jeff Bennion
- Merger of: Evergreen International
- Type: 501(c)(3) nonprofit organization
- Tax ID no.: 20-5436300
- Purpose: LGBTQ Mormon people
- Headquarters: Murray, Utah, USA
- Region served: Worldwide
- Subsidiaries: Voices of Hope
- Affiliations: Reconciliation and Growth Project, the Church of Jesus Christ of Latter-day Saints
- Volunteers: 21 (2024)
- Website: www.northstarsaints.org (formerly NorthStarLDS.org)
- Formerly called: North Star International

North Star Saints is an organization for LGBTQ people in the Latter-day Saint community. North Star is described as a faith-affirming resource for Latter-day Saint people addressing sexual orientation and gender identity topics who desire to follow teachings of the Church of Jesus Christ of Latter-day Saints (LDS Church). North Star supports the teaching of the LDS Church, including the law of chastity and teachings on homosexuality, which prohibits sexual relationships outside of a legal marriage between one man and one woman, as well as teachings on gender identity and expression. The organization takes "no official position on the origin or mutability of homosexual attractions or gender identity incongruence", and does not "endorse political causes or join political coalitions, including those officially sanctioned by the [LDS] Church."

North Star was founded in 2006. The organization holds an annual conference in Utah, as well as quarterly events, live-streamed firesides, and other smaller events in cities around the United States. It also manages several social media discussion groups for different sexual and gender minority demographics, as well as spouses, parents, and other family members.

The organization does not take a position on political issues, but has spoken out against using the suicide of gay LDS members to promote personal political agendas. Evergreen International, a similar organization that for many years operated parallel to North Star, was absorbed into North Star in early 2014.

== Involvement with conversion therapy ==
In 2014 North Star merged with the reparative-therapy-endorsing, LDS-founded organization Evergreen International, and North Star leadership used to give an implicit endorsement of Journey retreats run by Brothers Road (formerly called People Can Change) which was also founded by LDS men. Though North Star has never officially endorsed any therapy, two of its co-founders, Ty Mansfield (former president) and Jeff Bennion (former chair of the board of directors), were heavily involved in Brothers Road (BR) and its Journey Into Manhood (JiM) and Journey Beyond (JB) retreats. They allowed and participated in promoting BR in North Star online groups, pages, and the North Star yearly conferences. Many prominent members and leaders of North Star (such as those featured in TLC's "My Husband's Not Gay") were involved in conversion therapy, and board members Preston Dahlgreen and Jeff Bennion defended the Jewish conversion therapy organization JONAH in the 2015 court case Ferguson v. JONAH. In 2015, Mansfield stated that North Star no longer tacitly endorses any therapeutic organization or approach, but instead encourages individuals to share what has been personally helpful to them in finding congruence between their sexuality and their faith.

== Voices of Hope project ==
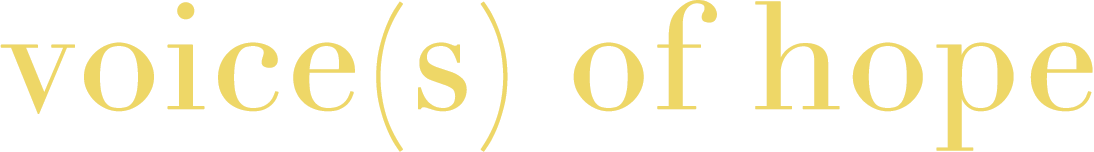
Voices of Hope logo

In 2012, North Star sponsored the launch of the Voices of Hope Project to share the stories of believing LGBTQ members of the LDS Church. The site features essays and over 70 video interviews. A sister project on gender identity and transgender experiences titled "Journeys of Faith" was launched in 2015.

== See also ==
- Affirmation Group
- Evergreen International
- Mormons Building Bridges Group
- Sexual orientation change efforts and the LDS Church
