= Personal Progress =

Young Womanhood Recognition Award.

Young Women Personal Progress was a goal-setting and achievement program within the Young Women organization of the Church of Jesus Christ of Latter-day Saints (LDS Church). The program ran from 1978 to 2019 and was roughly analogous to the Duty to God program in the Young Men organization.

== Details ==
Created in 1978, the stated purpose of Personal Progress was to help young women:

- Strengthen their testimonies of Jesus Christ
- Strengthen their present and future families
- Prepare to be worthy to make and keep sacred temple covenants
- Prepare for their future roles and responsibilities

Personal Progress was focused around the eight topics or values of the Young Women program, namely faith, divine nature, individual worth, knowledge, choice and accountability, good works, integrity and virtue. These values represented church morals and each had an associated color in the program. In February 2009, the value virtue was added to the original seven values. Each value has a series of value experiences and one value project which requires ten or more hours of preparation and delivery. Progress is recorded in a handbook by program leaders or the young woman's parents. To complete the program, the young woman must have seven completed value experiences and a project in each topic, verified by the leaders or parents. As of late 2010, much of the progress can be recorded and tracked online Completion of the program requires an interview with the local bishop, and is ultimately recognized by the Young Womanhood Recognition Award, a simple gold- or silver-colored medallion.

The Personal Progress book contained the following major sections: a copy of "The Family: A Proclamation to the World"; standards from "For the Strength of Youth"; the Young Women Theme, motto, and logo; an overview of the program; the eight values sections (listed above); a section to write down a testimony of Jesus Christ and the LDS Church; information about the Young Womanhood Recognition award; information about transitioning from the young women program into the adult program (Relief Society); sections for recording program progress; and an index.

Annual Young Women in Excellence meetings at a wards, or occasionally at a stake, allow young women to share their experiences or projects they have completed through the year. Young women earned the Young Womanhood Recognition Award were formally recognized in a special ceremony during this meeting. Attendees usually included the young women, their families, the young women program leaders, and ward or stake leaders. Young men were sometimes invited to attend, just as young women are sometimes invited to attend an Eagle Scout Court of Honor.

Personal Program was discontinued at the end of 2019 and replaced by the church's new "Children and Youth Program".
