= Association of Latter-day Saint Counselors and Psychotherapists =

Mental health organization in Utah

Association of Latter-day Saint Counselors and Psychotherapists (AMCAP)
- Formation: 1975; 51 years ago
- Founder: Joe J. Christensen
- Merger of: LDS Personnel and Guidance Association (LDS PGA) 1964–1975
- Type: Nonprofit
- Purpose: Organization for professional counselors and psychologists in the Church of Jesus Christ of Latter-day Saints
- Location: Orem, Utah, United States
- Fields: Counseling psychology
- Members: 400 (2011)
- Official language: English
- President: David T. Seamons
- Publication: Issues in Religion and Psychotherapy
- Website: ldsamcap.org
- Formerly called: Association of Mormon Counselors and Psychotherapists

The Association of Latter-day Saint Counselors and Psychotherapists (AMCAP) is a professional society founded in 1975 supporting professionals who want to provide counseling services supportive of teachings of the Church of Jesus Christ of Latter-day Saints (LDS Church). The organization further serves to increase trust in mental health professionals in the LDS community. In 2012, AMCAP held a Utah conference with the Foundation for Attraction Research on homosexuality called "Reconciling Faith and Feelings".
