= For the Strength of Youth (pamphlet) =

Pamphlet distributed by the LDS Church

- 2022 edition
- Author: The Church of Jesus Christ of Latter-day Saints
- Publisher: Intellectual Reserve, Inc.
- Publication date: 1965 (1st ed.); 2026 (11th, current ed.)
- OCLC: 23198861

For the Strength of Youth is a pamphlet distributed by the Church of Jesus Christ of Latter-day Saints (LDS Church) that "summarizes standards from scripture and from the writings and teachings of Church leaders." The pamphlet is intended primarily for young men and young women of the LDS Church. It is available on the Internet and in print form. The pamphlet was first published in 1965, with its 11th and most recent edition released in 2026. The pamphlet was to be put "in the hands of every young person in each ward".

== History ==
The LDS Church first published "For the Strength of Youth" in 1965. Subsequent editions were published in 1966, two in 1968, 1969, 1972, 1990, 2001, 2011, 2022, and most recently in 2026 (11th edition). The first edition of the pamphlet had 16 pages, while the ninth edition had 44 pages. Regarding the 2011 version, Young Women general president Elaine S. Dalton said, "The standards have not changed, but times have changed.... For the Strength of Youth has been revised to address the issues youth face today — to teach them the doctrine behind the standards and the promised blessings of obedience." The covers evolved from a depiction of a family in the first five editions to depictions of youth in the 1972 and 1990 versions, which were replaced with images of the Salt Lake Temple in some editions, a reflection of its goal to "help you prepare to make sacred covenants in the temple". The 10th edition also added a subtitle with it, called "For the Strength of Youth: A Guide for Making Choices." Dieter F. Uchtdorf, of the Quorum of the Twelve Apostles, stated the resource had been "refreshed to better cope with the challenges and temptations of our day." He said the pamphlet will teach people eternal truths about who they are and who Christ is, as well as how people can make choices based on the truths taught.

Cover art showing the transition to a focus on standards for attending the temple

== Contents ==
The current (11th) edition (2026) contains the follow sections:

- Message from the First Presidency
- Make inspired choices
- God's plan is for you
- God wants to communicate with you
- You can help with God's work
- Jesus Christ will help you
- Walk in God's light
- Love God, love your neighbor
- Ordinances and covenants give you access to God's blessings
- Temple ordinances and covenants give you greater access to God's blessings
- You are blessed by priesthood keys and authority
- Your body is sacred
- Truth will make you free
- Jesus Christ brings joy
- Appendix
- What about . . . ?

=== Homosexuality ===
The 1990 edition of the "For The Strength of Youth" pamphlet called homosexual activity an abomination.

The first explicit mention of homosexuality was contained in the 1990 (seventh) version of the pamphlet where it says, "the Lord specifically forbids ... sex perversion such as homosexuality". It continues "homosexual and lesbian activities are sinful and an abomination to the Lord" and "unnatural affections ... toward persons of the same gender are counter to God's eternal plan". The 2001 eighth version removes any mention of "unnatural affections" and "abomination" and only states, "homosexual activity is a serious sin. If you find your-self struggling with same-gender attraction, seek counsel from your parents and bishop. They will help you." In 2011, the ninth version was released adding to the 2001 paragraph that "lesbian behavior" is also a "serious sin" and that the youth should speak to their parents and bishop if they "are being persuaded to participate in inappropriate behavior". The 2022 update stated, "Feeling same-sex attraction is not a sin. If you have these feelings and do not pursue or act on them, you are living Heavenly Father's sacred law of chastity."

=== Clothing ===
Prior to 2022, editions of For the Strength of Youth contained more explicit standards regarding clothing and modesty. The 2011 edition stated:

Never lower your standards of dress. Do not use a special occasion as an excuse to be immodest. ... Immodest clothing is any clothing that is too tight, too sheer, or revealing in any other manner. Young women should avoid short shorts and short skirts, shirts that do not cover the stomach, and clothing that does not cover the shoulders or is low-cut in the front or the back.

The 2026 edition advised youth to "treat your body—and others’ bodies—with respect" and to "avoid styles that emphasize or bring inappropriate attention to your physical body instead of who you are as a child of God with an eternal future".

== For the Strength of Youth conferences ==
In 2019, the LDS Church announced the intent to begin regional week-long youth activities called For the Strength of Youth (FSY) conferences worldwide in 2020. Such conferences have been previously held outside of the United States and Canada. The FSY conferences in the United States and Canada replaced Especially for Youth conferences that had been operated by church-owned Brigham Young University for more than 40 years. A press release stated, "FSY conferences include activities, devotionals, and classes designed to help strengthen faith in Jesus Christ and provide opportunities for youth to grow spiritually, socially, physically, and intellectually." Young Men general president Steven J. Lund stated that "Experiences like FSY conferences ... can help to burnish our testimonies, taking us through arcs of growth and spiritual discovery to places of relative peace." Apart from classes and devotionals, some of the activities during these conferences, as explained on the official FSY page, include gospel study, dances, games, goal setting, and a musical program. The starting of FSY conferences in the United States and Canada was delayed until 2021, due to the coronavirus pandemic.

== See also ==
- Duty to God Award
- Personal Progress
- Sexuality and Mormonism
- Culture of the LDS Church
- Beliefs and practices of the LDS Church
