= Duty to God Award =

- Medal
- Presented by: The Church of Jesus Christ of Latter-day Saints
- First award: 1954
- Final award: 2019
- Website: Duty to God

The Duty to God Award honor was presented to young men who participated and excelled in their duties in the Aaronic Priesthood within the Church of Jesus Christ of Latter-day Saints. The Duty to God program, which operated in various formats from 1954 until 2019 for young men, was roughly equivalent to the Personal Progress program for the church's young women.

== History ==
The award was created in 1954 to align the activities of Scouting with priesthood responsibilities.

In 2002, the award's requirements and design were modified to focus young men on preparation for temple, missionary, and family goals. The award was further modified again in 2010.

Although the Duty to God award never required participation in the Scouting programs of the Boy Scouts of America (BSA), the BSA recognized it as evidence of a Scout's commitment to its principles. In May 2018, the church announced that in January, 2020, it would launch a new worldwide initiative for children and youth. As a part of this change, the church would no longer be a BSA chartered organization. The new "Children and Youth Program" replaced all existing activity programs for girls and boys, young women and young men beginning in January 2020.

== Award requirements ==
The most recent award program officially began in January 2002 and was revised in 2010. Aaronic Priesthood candidates would qualify for the Duty to God Award after completing specific requirements regarding priesthood duties. These were defined as involvement in family activities, participation in the church's quorum activities, the successful completion of a Duty to God service project, and reaching personal goals relating to education, spiritual and physical development, and social interactions.

== Award name and design ==
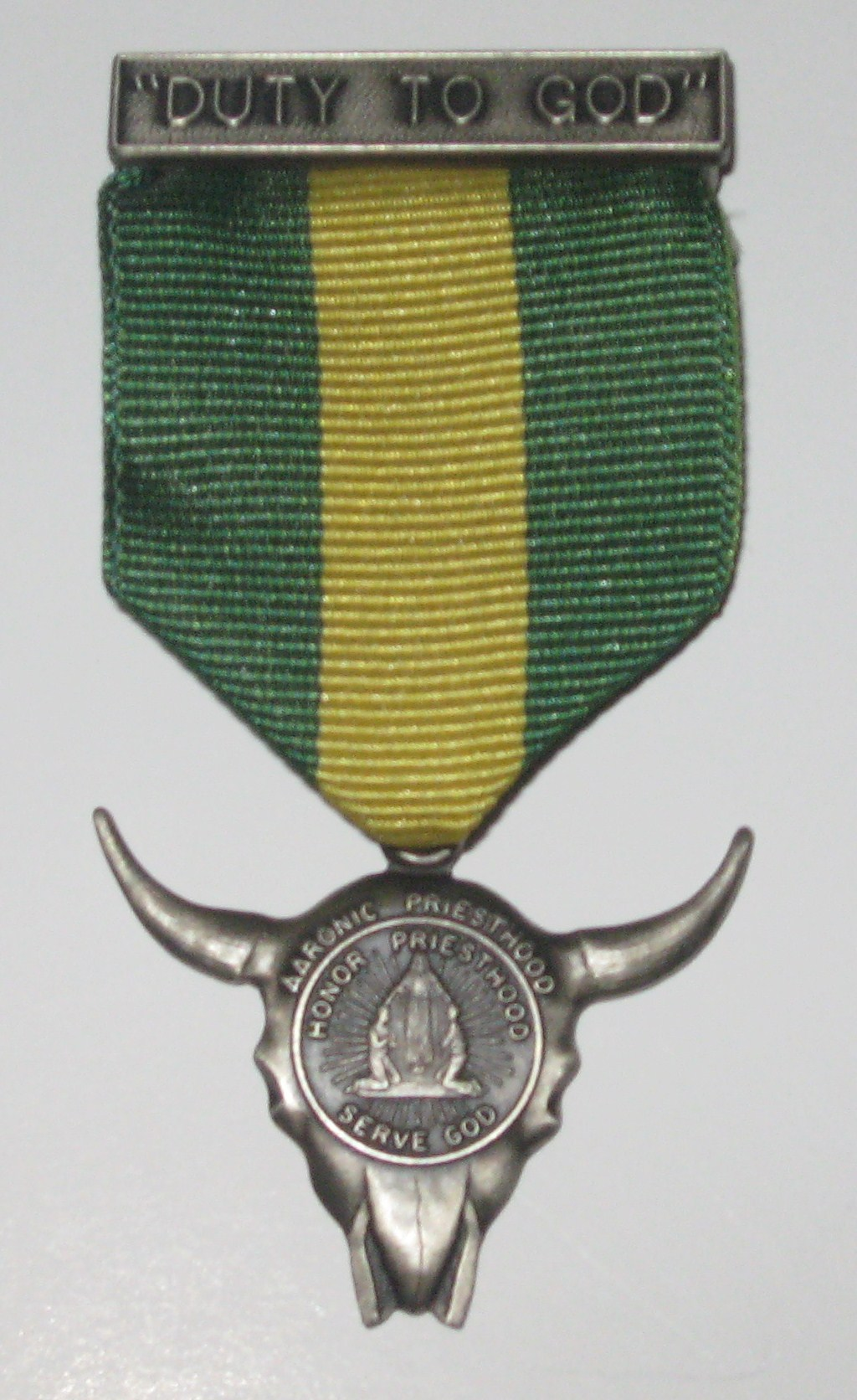
The Duty to God Award as it appeared when used in conjunction with the Boy Scouts of America prior to 2002

The award and its qualifying program is named from a passage in the Book of Mormon:

"I have said these things unto you that I might awaken you to a sense of your duty to God, that ye may walk blameless before him, that ye may walk after the holy order of God" (Alma 7:22).

The award, a circular medallion, was designed by Douglas Coy Miles. Before 2002, the award was a buffalo skull-shaped medal designed by Avard Fairbanks.

== See also ==
- Young Men (organization)
- Religious awards for scouting in the Church of Jesus Christ of Latter-day Saints
