= Evergreen International =

American Latter-day Saints organization

- Merged into: North Star
- Founded: 1989; 37 years ago
- Dissolved: 2014
- Type: Nonprofit organization
- Tax ID no.: 87-0501992
- Headquarters: Salt Lake City, Utah, USA
- President: David Pruden
- Secretary & Treasurer: Julie Haws
- Affiliations: The Church of Jesus Christ of Latter-day Saints
- Revenue: $6,151 (2014)
- Expenses: $9,682 (2014)
- Website: www.evergreeninternational.org
- Formerly called: Evergreen

Evergreen International, Inc. was a nonprofit, tax-exempt organization located in Salt Lake City, Utah, whose stated mission was to assist "people who want to diminish same-sex attractions and overcome homosexual behavior". These pseudoscientific views of sexual orientation and sexual orientation change efforts are strongly opposed in peer-reviewed literature in the 21st century. Evergreen was endorsed by, but independent of the Church of Jesus Christ of Latter-day Saints (LDS Church). Founded in 1989 by eleven Mormon men, Evergreen closed in 2014 after being absorbed by North Star.

== Conferences ==
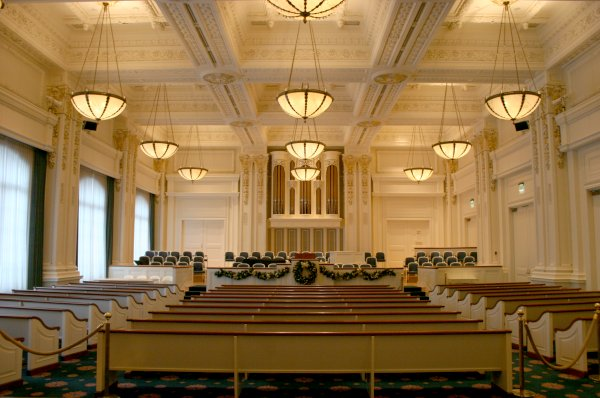
Chapel at LDS Church headquarters where many Evergreen Conferences were held until 2012

Many top LDS church leaders spoke at Evergreen conferences including the following:

- 2007 – Church seventy Douglas Callister spoke at an Evergreen conference and urged listeners to battle their challenge of "same-gender inclinations" and thoughts through prayer, fasting, and taking the sacrament.
- 2009 – Elder Bruce C. Hafen of the First Quorum of the Seventy gave an address at the 19th annual Evergreen conference. Hafen said, "If you are faithful, on resurrection morning—and maybe even before then—you will rise with normal attractions for the opposite sex. Some of you may wonder if that doctrine is too good to be true. But Elder Dallin H. Oaks has said it MUST be true, because 'there is no fullness of joy in the next life without a family unit, including a husband and wife, and posterity.' And 'men (and women) are that they might have joy.'"
- 2010 – Keith B. McMullin of the Presiding Bishopric addressed the 20th annual conference. McMullin counseled that "If someone seeking your help says to you, 'I am homosexual' or 'I am lesbian' or 'I am gay,' correct this miscasting. Heavenly Father does not speak of His children this way, and neither should we. It is simply not true. To speak this way sows seeds of doubt and deceit about who we are. It belittles, depreciates, and disparages the individual." He further teaches that the "such limitations" as same-gender attraction won't exist after death, though "in and of itself it is neither evil nor sinful".

== Overview ==
As many as 40% of Evergreen members were in heterosexual marriages. American psychologist Warren Throckmorton reviewed Understanding the meaning of change for married Latter-Day Saint men with histories of homosexual activity by J. W. Robinson. Robinson interviewed seven heterosexually married men who had been through Evergreen and previously identified as gay. They believed that they had a spiritual transformation that changed their orientation. They also stated that they were no longer troubled by feeling different or rejected by heterosexual men, emotional attraction to men, sexual attraction to men, feeling bad about same-sex desires, social isolation, or compulsive sexual thoughts and behaviors. Robinson found that their change came from a new understanding that prior same-sex attractions did not require them to be gay.

== Association with NARTH ==
Evergreen had ties to a larger national organization that was an influential promoter of reparative therapy. The National Association for Research & Therapy of Homosexuality (NARTH) was founded in 1992, and is an organization that (since 2014) functions under the name Alliance for Therapeutic Choice and Scientific Integrity (ATCSI). It offers conversion therapy and other regimens that the organization says can change the sexual orientation of people attracted to the same sex.

The Evergreen website referenced the methods of NARTH founder Joseph Nicolosi as "beneficial". Nicolosi worked with A. Dean Byrd (an Evergreen Board member, Director of Clinical Training for LDS Social Services, and Brigham Young University professor) to author several papers on reparative therapy. Byrd was the foremost proponent of sexual orientation change efforts among LDS Church members, and served as president of NARTH. He published an article in the LDS church's September 1999 Ensign. Additionally, David C. Pruden served as director of Evergreen, and as vice-president and executive director for NARTH. Likewise, Director of Family Services Jerry Harris served in NARTH leadership.

== Closure and transition to North Star ==
In January 2014, Evergreen International announced that it had closed and had merged some of its operations with North Star, a support group for LDS church members attracted to the same sex and/or experiencing gender dysphoria. North Star takes no position on the question of whether sexual orientation change is possible.

== See also ==
- Affirmation: Gay & Lesbian Mormons
- Criticism of Mormonism
- Ex-gay
- Homosexuality and the LDS Church
- Sexual orientation change efforts
- Sexual orientation change efforts and the LDS Church
