= John Vandenbergh =

John Vandenbergh is an Emeritus Professor of Zoology at North Carolina State University in the United States. He attended Montclair State University in New Jersey, earning a BA in 1957, then Ohio University in 1959 with an MS in Zoology, and received his PhD from Pennsylvania State University in 1962. His research focused on the effects of prenatal hormone exposure and endocrine disruption on rodent behaviour, physiology and anatomy. He has previously advised the Environmental Protection Agency on endocrine disrupters such as Bisphenol A (BPA).

After receiving his PhD, Vandenbergh served as a research scientist with the National Institutes of Health in Puerto Rico from 1962 to 1965, studying rhesus monkeys, before moving to work for the North Carolina Department of Mental Health in the laboratory of Dorothea Dix Hospital in Raleigh. In 1977 he moved to NC State University to head the Department of Zoology, focusing on administration and research. Vandenbergh began teaching in 1989 and expanded his research to include behavioral endocrinology and reproduction. One of his research findings included the identification of the pheromonal effects that regulate the onset of puberty in mice. In 2002, Vandenbergh received the Holladay Award, the highest award presented to faculty at NC State. He retired from NC State in 2003.

Outside of teaching, Vandenbergh is a founding board member of the NC Association for Biomedical Research (https://www.ncabr.org/) at state level, and is a fellow and former president of the national Animal Behavior Society. He has also served on several committees at the National Academies of Science. Most recently, Vandenbergh served on the National Toxicology Program's Expert Panel on the risks of exposure to BPA, especially in young and pregnant women.

Vandenbergh was also involved in the restoration of Yates Mill, a grist mill south of Raleigh, NC.

Vandenbergh lives in Raleigh, North Carolina, with his wife Barbara.

== Selected publications ==
- Vandenbergh, J.G. (2009) Effects of the intrauterine position in litter-bearing mammals. In: Maternal Effects in Mammals, D Maestripieri and JM Mateo, eds., University of Chicago Press.
- Chapin, R.E., J. Adams, K. Boekelheide, L.E. Gray Jr., S.W. Hayward, P.S.J. Lees, B.S. McIntire, K.M. Portier, T.M. Schorr, S.G. Selevan, J.G. Vandenbergh, and S.R. Woskie (2008) NTP-CERHR Expert panel report on the reproductive and developmental toxicology of bisphenol A. Birth Defects Res. (B) 83:157-395.
- Vandenbergh, J.G. (2008) The house mouse in biomedical research. In: Source Book of Models for Biomedical Research. PM Conn, ed., Humana Press, Totowa, NG. Pages 187-190.
- Richter, C.A., L.S. Birnbaum, F. Farabollini, R.R. Newbold, B.S. Rubin, C.E. Talsnes, J.G. Vandenbergh, D.R. Walser-Kuntz, and F.S. vomSaal (2007) In vivo effects of bisphenol A in laboratory animals. Repro. Toxicol. 24:199-224.
- Vandenbergh, J.G. (2003) Prenatal hormone exposure and sexual variation. Am. Sci. 91:218-225.
- NRC Committee (J.G. Vandenbergh, Chair) (2002). Animal Biotechnology: Science-Based Concerns. National Academy Press, Washington, DC.
- Vandenberg, J.G. (1988) Pheromones and mammalian reproduction. In: The Physiology of Reproduction. E Knobil and J Neill, eds., Raven Press, NY 2:1679-1696.
- Vandenbergh, J.G., ed. (1983) Pheromones and Reproduction in Mammals. Academic Press, NY.
