= A. Dean Byrd =

Dean Byrd
- Born: Albert Dean Byrd; August 22, 1948; United States
- Died: April 4, 2012 (aged 63)
- Resting place: Highland City Cemetery, Utah
- Education: Brigham Young University
- Spouse: Elaine Harlow Byrd
- Parents: Imouri (Moody) Jung Jones; George Otto Byrd

Albert Dean Byrd (1948 – 4 April 2012) was a former president of the National Association for Research & Therapy of Homosexuality (NARTH), a research organization that advocates sexual orientation change efforts (SOCE). He was a psychologist who focused on SOCE, and wrote on the topic. Although raised by a Buddhist mother and a Baptist father, Byrd converted to the Church of Jesus Christ of Latter-day Saints (LDS Church) and was very active in the debate within the church on issues involving homosexuality.

== Professional life ==
Byrd was a well known supporter of conversion therapy, and authored more than 100 publications, including books, peer-reviewed scientific journals, law journals, book chapters, invited commentaries and opinion editorials, many of which addressed issues of human sexuality. In 2002, he presented a paper which describes a technique called gender-affirmative therapy. He stated: "The basic premise of gender-affirmative therapy is that social and emotional variables affect gender identity which, in turn, determines sexual orientation. The work of the therapist is to help people understand their gender development. Subsequently, such individuals are able to make choices that are consistent with their value system. The focus of therapy is to help clients fully develop their masculine or feminine identity". He wrote several papers with Joseph Nicolosi. One of the largest was a survey of 882 people who were undergoing therapy, attending ex-gay groups or ex-gay conferences: 22.9% reported they had not undergone any changes, 42.7% reported some changes, and 34.3% reported much change in sexual orientation. As a group, they reported large reductions in homosexual thoughts and fantasies and improvements in their psychological, interpersonal, and spiritual well-being. He promoted his ideas on college campuses, in newspapers, and in several books. He was called as a professional witness to testify on behalf of Andrew McClintock, a Christian magistrate who was forced to resign due to his beliefs on homosexual parents. In 2007, he was asked to chair a symposium at the APA Convention in San Francisco.

Byrd received a Ph.D. in psychology from Brigham Young University (BYU), a post-doctoral degree in Child and Family Psychology from Virginia Commonwealth University and Medical College of Virginia, and a post-doctoral degree in Behavioral Medicine from Loyola University, Chicago. He also received both an M.P.H. from the University of Utah (U of U), School of Medicine, and an M.B.A. also from the U of U. He was a diplomate in forensic medicine.

Byrd served as the Director of Clinical Training for LDS Social Services, was a Clinical Professor at BYU, and was, at the time of his death, a Clinical Professor at the University of Utah, School of Medicine, with appointments in the Department of Family and Preventive Medicine and in Department of Psychiatry, with an adjunct clinical appointment in the Department of Family Studies, also at the University of Utah. As member of the faculty at the U of U, he lectured training medical students about disparities in health care in the population. He was also a member of the American Psychological Association, the Utah Psychological Association where he served on the governing board, with professional affiliations in the American Orthopsychiatric Association, where he was a fellow, the American Public Health Association, the American Board of Forensic Examiners and the Prescribing Psychologist Register, a training and credentialing organization for psychologists in psychopharmacology. He was also a former member of the Evergreen Board of Trustees. He was also the president of Thrasher Research Fund, a pediatric research granting institution. In 2007, he was elected as president of NARTH for 2008. Byrd had visiting professor appointments in Israel and Poland. He also had training in genetics, biochemistry and neurochemistry from the University of California at Berkeley.

== Within the LDS Church ==
The LDS Church does not view homosexual attractions as sinful, but does teach its members to abstain from homosexual sex. It does not have an official view on the cause of homosexuality. Byrd had been prominent in defending and explaining the church's position, as well as promoting his own views. He wrote four books aimed at Latter-day Saint audiences and, in 1999, published When a Loved One Struggles with Same-Sex Attraction in the Ensign, an official church magazine. It was the first article published in one of the church's magazines giving advice on how to love people with homosexual inclinations. He was a member of the Evergreen Board of Trustees, an ex-gay organization catering to Latter-day Saints.

Byrd gave presentations and wrote several articles for the Foundation for Apologetic Information & Research dealing with homosexuality. He wrote critically of No More Goodbyes, written by Latter-day Saint author Carol Lynn Pearson, and In Quiet Desperation, a book about a Latter-day Saint man's efforts to faithfully live his religion while having same-sex attractions. In turn, his critique was criticized by other Latter-day Saint counselors, as well as by one of the book's authors, Ty Mansfield.

== Death ==
Byrd died of cancer on 4 April 2012.

== Bibliography ==
- Willpower Is Not Enough: Why We Don't Succeed at Change (1995) ISBN 978-0-87579-871-4
- Homosexuality and the Church of Jesus Christ (2001) ISBN 978-1-55517-555-9
- Waking in Winter (2001) ISBN 978-1-55517-531-3
- Finding Wholeness and Happiness After Divorce (2004) ISBN 978-1-59038-316-2
