= Victor L. Brown =

American LDS presiding bishop

Victor Lee Brown
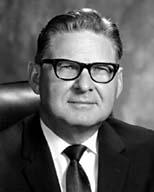

Emeritus General Authority
- 30 September 1989 – 26 March 1996
- Called by: Ezra Taft Benson

First Quorum of the Seventy
- 6 April 1985 – 30 September 1989
- Called by: Spencer W. Kimball
- End reason: Granted general authority emeritus status

Presiding Bishop
- 6 April 1972 – 6 April 1985
- Called by: Joseph Fielding Smith
- End reason: Honorably released

Second Counselor in the Presiding Bishopric
- 30 September 1961 – 6 April 1972
- Called by: John H. Vandenberg
- End reason: Honorable release of John H. Vandenberg and his counselors

Personal details
- Born: 31 July 1914; Cardston, Alberta, Canada
- Died: March 26, 1996 (aged 81); Salt Lake City, Utah, United States
- Resting place: Wasatch Lawn Memorial Park; 40.698°N 111.842°W

Victor Lee Brown (31 July 1914 – 26 March 1996) was the tenth Presiding Bishop of the Church of Jesus Christ of Latter-day Saints (LDS Church) from 1972 to 1985. He was an LDS Church general authority from 1961 until his death.

Brown was born in Cardston, Alberta, Canada, the son of Gerald Stephen Brown and Maggie Calder Lee. Brown received his education from the University of Utah, LDS Business College and the University of California, Berkeley. He worked in various ground operations management positions for several different airlines before becoming a full-time leader in the LDS Church.

Among other positions in the LDS Church, Brown served as bishop of the Denver 4th Ward. He and his wife, Lois Kjar, were the parents of five children. One of their children, Victor L. Brown Jr., served as a stake president and an area director for the church's Welfare Services .

In 1961, Brown was called as second counselor to John H. Vandenberg in the presiding bishopric. In 1972, he succeeded Vandenberg.

In 1985, Brown was released as Presiding Bishop and called as a member of the First Quorum of the Seventy and as president of the Salt Lake Temple. He was designated an emeritus general authority in 1989. Brown died at Salt Lake City, Utah.

== See also ==
- Council on the Disposition of the Tithes

The Church of Jesus Christ of Latter-day Saints titles
Preceded by John H. Vandenburg	Presiding Bishop; 6 April 1972 – 6 April 1985	Succeeded by Robert D. Hales
Preceded by Carl W. Buehner	Second Counselor in the Presiding Bishopric; 30 September 1961 – 6 April 1972	Succeeded by Vaughn J Featherstone
