= LDS Family Services =

Family Services
- Formerly: LDS Family Services
- Type: Nonprofit organization
- Industry: Counseling services
- Founded: 1919
- Founder: Amy B. Lyman
- Key people: Marvin J. Ashton; Thomas S. Monson; John Vandenbergh; Belle S. Spafford
- Parent: The Church of Jesus Christ of Latter-day Saints

Family Services (formerly LDS Family Services) is a private nonprofit corporation owned and operated by the Church of Jesus Christ of Latter-day Saints. It offers members of the church and others marital and family counseling, addiction and drug dependency counseling, general psychotherapy, counseling, and other services to women or girls experiencing unintended pregnancy. In addition to individual counseling, classes are offered on strengthening marriage and families, along with the Addiction Recovery Program, which is based on the 12-step model and Christian values.

== History ==
In 1919, the organization was created as the Relief Society Social Service Department (RSSSD) by Amy B. Lyman, an official in the church's Relief Society organization. In 1969, the organization was renamed Unified Social Services (USS) and separated from the Relief Society. In 1973, the organization became a corporation separate from the church and was renamed LDS Social Services; in 1995, the name was changed to LDS Family Services. In 2019, the name was changed to Family Services.

Until 1934, the program only had professional staff in Salt Lake City. In that year additional offices were opened in Ogden, Utah and Los Angeles, California. Starting in 1957 the Indian Placement Program was placed under the auspices of the RSSSD. In 1962, a branch office was opened in Phoenix, Arizona, with another opened in Las Vegas, Nevada in 1965.

When the program was removed from being under the direction of the Relief Society and USS was created in 1969, Marvin J. Ashton was appointed as managing director. The USS oversight committee consisted of Marion G. Romney as chair, with Spencer W. Kimball, Thomas S. Monson, John Vandenbergh (the church's presiding bishop), and Belle S. Spafford as members. In 1971, when Ashton became a member of the Quorum of the Twelve he was replaced by Victor L. Brown.

As of 2019, Family Services has 85 offices in the United States, Canada, Europe, Australia, New Zealand, Korea, Japan, South Africa, Philippines, Tonga, Mexico, Brazil and several other south and central American countries. Staff must have a minimum of a master's degree in behavioral sciences.

=== Adoption services discontinued ===
For decades, Family Services had been one of the largest private nonprofit adoption agencies in the world. However, in June 2014, the agency announced that it would no longer operate a full-scale adoption agency. Instead, Family Services planned to shift all of its adoption-related resources to counseling for birth parents and prospective adoptive parents and partner with local agencies for services it no longer provided. According to the Deseret News, the agency cited changes in adoption trends such as the reduction in children available for adoption. Family Services has been the subject of lawsuits about fathers' rights in some adoption cases, and other religious-based adoption agencies are under pressure to facilitate adoptions for same-sex couples. But the organization said that none of these issues influenced its decision.
