= Timeline of LGBTQ Mormon history in the 2000s =

Events from 2000-2009 around LGBTQ people and the LDS Church

This is a timeline of LGBT Mormon history in the first decade of the 2000s, part of a series of timelines consisting of events, publications, and speeches about LGBTQ+ individuals, topics around sexual orientation and gender minorities, and the community of members of the Church of Jesus Christ of Latter-day Saints (LDS Church).

== Timeline ==
=== 2000 ===
- 2000 – People Can Change was founded by Latter-Day Saints Rich Wyler and David Matheson as a nonprofit organization that provided gay conversion therapy. The organization started its Journey into Manhood retreat in 2002. The organization later changed its name in 2016 to Brothers on a Road Less Traveled.
- February – Stuart Matis, a 32-year-old gay man active in the church, died by suicide on the steps of a California church stake center building during the height of the LDS Church's fight to ban same-sex marriage in California with Proposition 22. Four days before, his letter to the editor had been published in the BYU newspaper pleading for the acceptance of homosexual individuals in response to a letter published five days before comparing homosexuality to pedophilia, bestiality and Satanism. His death was closely followed by the suicides of his gay Mormon friend and former mission companion, Clay Whitmer, and D.J. Thompson, a 33-year-old gay Mormon man who referenced Matis in his suicide note.
- September – Alexander B. Morrison, of the First Quorum of the Seventy, and Robert L. Millet, Dean of BYU Religion Education, addressed members of Evergreen International on September 16 at its 10th annual conference, which was held in the church's Joseph Smith Memorial Building. In Morrison's address he stated, "Avoid as the plague social interaction with persons who justify, encourage or engage in homosexual behavior."
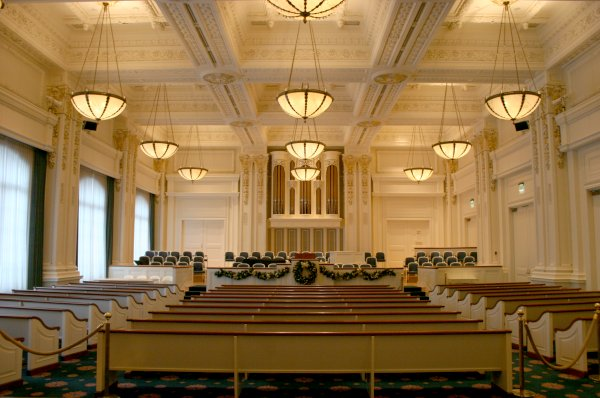
  The Joseph Smith Memorial Building chapel at Temple Square where many Evergreen conferences were held
  To the congregation of hundreds of homosexual men and women he further directed, "Stay away from places where those challenged by same-gender attraction congregate." Millet stated that through Christ "all inappropriate inclinations or orientations [can be] transformed in this life" or "resist[ed]".
- October – Former bishop David Eccles Hardy and his spouse Carly held a Salt Lake City press conference condemning church leaders' teachings around homosexuality after his teenage gay son Judd attempted suicide early the year before. In response a spokesperson stated, "These are individuals who are children of God. We love them; we respect them. This church is a church of inclusion, not exclusion, and we welcome them and want them to be a part of the church."
- October – Boyd K. Packer gave his October General Conference address in which he calls homosexuality a "temptation which seems nearly overpowering for man to be attracted to man or woman to woman" that may "lead to despair, to disease, even to death". He said it begins as an "innocent curiosity" which leads to a "pattern" leading to an "addiction". He said the idea that "God created them with overpowering, unnatural desires" is "not true" stating that "He can cure and He can heal".

=== 2001 ===
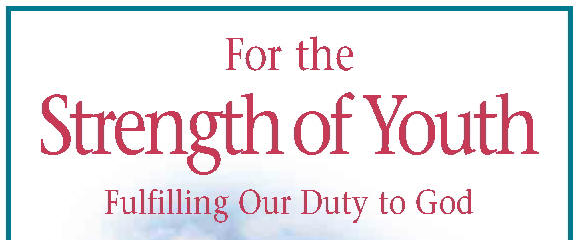
The 2001 update to the youth guideline pamphlet removed the harsher language of the 1990 edition which characterized homosexual feelings as unnatural, perverse, and an abomination.

- 2001 – Family Services surveyed 381 of their clients who were homosexual and wanted to change their attractions, and 71% reported significant progress in their sexual orientation change therapy.
- 2001 – The eighth version of the "For the Strength of Youth" pamphlet was published updating the section discussing homosexuality. The new version only says, "Homosexual activity is a serious sin. If you find your-self struggling with same-gender attraction, seek counsel from your parents and bishop. They will help you."
- 2001 – Dean Byrd a director of LDS Family Services published a book entirely on homosexuality and the church stating that "the Church repeatedly, in nearly every statement about homosexual relations, teaches that homosexual attraction is not inherent to a particular genetic make-up and that they are quite able to change."
- March – Gay LDS Young Adults (GLYA) is founded by Aaron Cloward and organizes activities in the Intermountain West for gay Mormon young adults. They had over 400 people on their mailing list but seemed to be absorbed by Affirmation by about 2003.
- September – Sharon G. Larsen of the Young Women General Presidency addressed the 11th Annual Evergreen Conference in the Joseph Smith Memorial Building. In her talk she stated same-gender attraction "is not in itself necessarily sinful unless it leads to impure thoughts and unrighteous behavior" and that those who "struggle with same-gender attraction" who "despite persistent effort cannot overcome that attraction and marry someone" of the opposite gender "must remain celibate".
- October – At BYU's Family Under Fire Conference, Family Services director Jerry Harris gave some "steps to recovery" from homosexuality for gay people to use.
- November – Confessions of a Mormon Boy by Steven Fales opens (later becoming an off Broadway show), dealing with Fales' homosexuality, and disaffection with the church. It later tours internationally.

=== 2002 ===
- 2002 – Reform Mormonism was founded as a loose group of intellectuals, feminists, and LGBTQ people. The group has sought to create a space where Mormon ideas and expressions can be shared outside the framework of an organized religion through blogs, conferences, and original books of scripture.
- February – Church spokesperson Harold Brown stated that no amount of press or protest would change church rules on homosexuality. The statement came in response to media attention to former bishop David Eccles Hardy who condemned church leaders' teachings and church publications around homosexuality after his gay son had attempted suicide in early 1999.
- August – The official church Ensign magazine published an anonymously authored article by an LDS woman attracted to other women. The author gave advice for how "to overcome this challenge" including advising against "attach[ing] labels to yourself or others who struggle with this problem" since these temptations "do not define who we are". She also recommended a person "quit [their] job" if necessary to "avoid places frequented by those who are involved in this lifestyle".

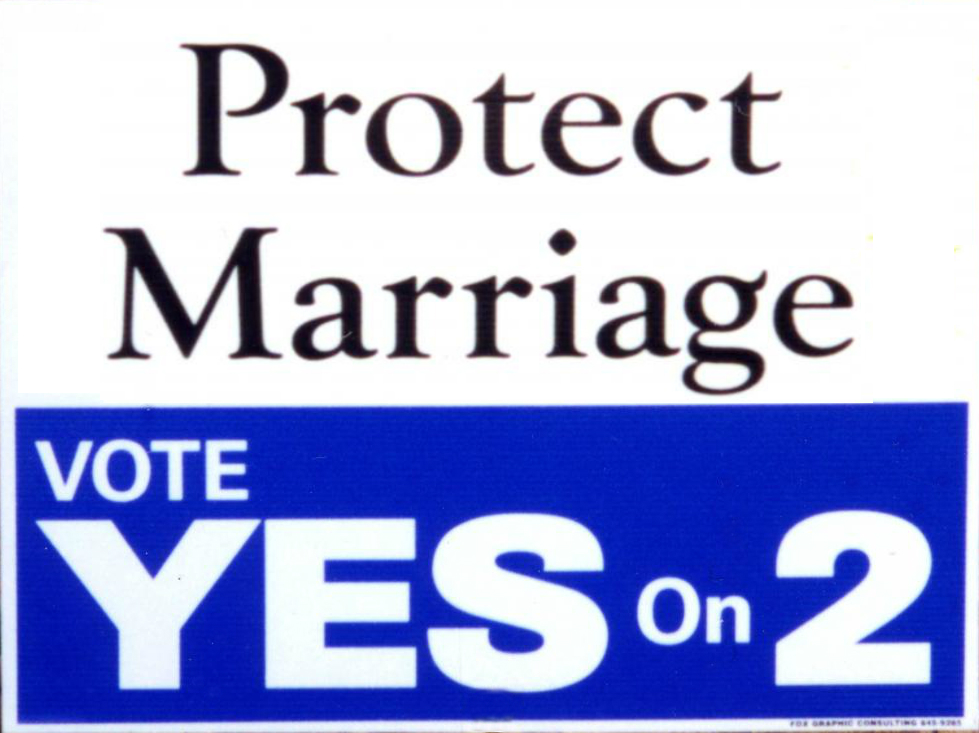
A yard sign distributed to church members

- November – With heavy influence from the LDS Church, Nevada state's Question 2 on amending the state constitution to ban same-sex marriage passed on the 5th after also winning a majority vote in the general elections two years prior. A Nevada Mormon newspaper, Beehive, first reported the Coalition for the Protection of Marriage's intent to file an initiative petition in December 1999. The coalition raised over $800,000 by October 2000 from mostly Mormon-owned businesses and LDS individuals. Mormon leaders had strongly encouraged members through letters with church letterhead to do campaign work and post yard signs distributed at church buildings.
- November – Several notable Mormon leaders including James O. Mason, Joe J. Christensen, and Ardeth G. Kapp founded the Mental Health Resource Foundation (also initially called the Hidden Treasures Foundation) as a resource for Mormon leaders and members. The website was advertised in church publications and contained never-before-published materials from Family Services and a guide on changing homosexual attractions called Helping Individuals Who Want to Diminish Same-Gender Desires And Stop Same-Gender Sexual Behavior.

=== 2003 ===
- January – After facing criticism from several organizations, KBYU and BYU-TV cancelled the planned broadcast of LDS therapists Jeff Robinson's presentation "Homosexuality: What Works and What Doesn't Work" given at BYU's 2002 Families Under Fire conference. The talk characterized homosexuality as a serious addiction that could be cured with enough motivation, and stated that gay men can develop a sexual attraction to women if they walk away from rather than focus or fight the dragon of their gayness.
- July – A controversial fictional film about a gay Mormon missionary, Latter Days is released garnering numerous film festival awards.
- October – Family Services counselor Jerry Harris presented at BYU's Families Under Fire conference on helping people overcome their homosexuality.
- October – The LGBTQ Affirmative Psychotherapists Guild of Utah was founded by Robin Tracy. It later became a nonprofit and was renamed to the LGBTQ-Affirmative Therapist Guild of Utah in 2011.

=== 2004 ===
- 2004 – The church published True to the Faith, which states, "homosexual activity is a serious sin .... contrary to the purposes of human sexuality" which "distorts loving relationships and prevents people from receiving blessings". The book further states "sexual sins are more serious than any other sins except murder and denying the Holy Ghost".
- 2004 – The church's publishing company Deseret Book released the book In Quiet Desperation: Understanding the Challenge of Same-gender Attraction by Ty Mansfield, and Fred and Marilyn Matis. The book contained a firsthand account of Ty's experience coming to terms with his sexual orientation and religious views as well as the parent's telling of their gay Mormon son's experiences and suicide. Mansfield later married a woman and was editor over another Deseret Book on homosexuality, in 2011, titled Voices of Hope: Latter-day Saint Perspectives on Same-gender Attraction—An Anthology of Gospel Teachings and Personal Essays.
- 2004 – Los Angeles bishop Robert Rees stated in an academic presentation that of the 50 homosexual Mormons with whom he had a close relationship over the past two decades, not a single one "was able to change or alter his or her sexual orientation," and that he had not "met a single homosexual Latter-day Saint who had not tried valiantly, generally over a long period of time, to change his or her orientation."
- July – The First Presidency issued the July 7 statement saying the church "favors a constitutional amendment preserving marriage as the lawful union of a man and a woman." A few months later on October 19 they expounded this stance with the First Presidency Statement on Same-Gender Marriage supporting the 2004 movement to add an amendment to the US Constitution defining marriage as between "a man and a woman" and barring the "legal status" of any other union. The letter also states that the church "reach out with understanding and respect" for homosexual persons and "realize there may be great loneliness in their lives", but defend their stance as being "right before the Lord".
- September – The church's Ensign magazine published an anonymous article of a Mormon man struggling to curb and overcome his attractions to some other men.
- September – Merrill J. Bateman in the Presidency of the Seventy gave a September 18 address at the 14th Evergreen Conference for homosexual Mormons. He explained that for those "struggling with nature, with thoughts and feelings that are opposite from what the Church teaches" Jesus has the power to "assuage one's feelings" and "assist one in his efforts to abstain".
- December – Gordon B. Hinckley gave an interview in which he did not support same-sex civil unions and spoke against same-sex marriage. He also stated that gay people have a problem that the church wants to help them solve, though, he said he did not know if they were born with this problem.

=== 2005 ===
- 2005 – The Foundation for Attraction Research (FAR) is founded by LDS lawyer Dennis Dahle, BYU psychology professor Dean Byrd, and BYU social work professor Shirley Cox, with a board of directors also consisting of BYU English professor Doris Dant, BYU law professor William Duncan, BYU religion professor John Livinstone, and retired BYU psychology professor Gawain Wells. In 2009 the organization published Understanding Same-Sex Attraction which advocated therapy to change sexual attractions. In 2012 FAR co-hosted the Reconciling Faith and Feelings conference with the Association of Mormon Counselors and Psychotherapists (AMCAP).
- October – The church published an article tying the term gender confusion to homosexuality stating, "If governments were to alter the moral climate by legitimizing same-sex marriages, gender confusion would increase, particularly among children, and this would further blur the line between good and evil."
- September – James O. Mason of the Second Quorum of the Seventy addressed members of Evergreen International on September 17 at its 15th annual conference in the church's Joseph Smith Memorial Building. He stated, "Can individuals struggling with some same-gender attraction be cured? 'With God nothing should be impossible' (Luke 1:37) ... The right course of action remains the same: eliminate or diminish same sex attraction .... Feelings of attraction toward someone of the same gender should be eliminated if possible or controlled."
- October – At BYU's Families Under Fire Conference BYU social work professor Shirley Cox presented on homosexuality stating that homosexual attractions can be diminished and that the treatment of unwanted same-sex attraction has a history of being successful.
- December – Shortly after Provo High School students started the first gay-straight alliance in the nearly 90% Mormon Utah County, LDS state Senator Chris Buttars announced a controversial bill to ban gay-straight alliances in Utah public schools.

=== 2006 ===
- 2006 – The Church Handbook is updated again and leaders are told to collect and destroy all copies of the previous 1998 version. The new version clarifies that the church "reaches out with respect and understanding" to same-sex attracted individuals.
- 2006 – The church's Mission Presidents Handbook recommended that unless there are unusual circumstances, a missionary who makes a belated confession to a "serious transgression" like "homosexual acts" committed before their missionary service be sent home. The manual also specified that any baptismal candidate who confesses to a "homosexual transgression" during a baptismal interview (usually with a mission district leader) requires a "searching interview" with the president of the local mission in order to be approved for baptism.
- March – Jeffrey R. Holland and Marlin K. Jensen were interviewed in March with questions about various topics including homosexuality by PBS for a four-hour special called The Mormons. Jensen stated that he did not think the "church could ever change its position" on homosexual behavior. "There's no room within the plan of salvation ... for homosexuality to be accepted" or for someone to "be romantically involved with someone of the same gender and ... be living in accord with God's plan." He acknowledges that this "creates a lot of pain" and asks "a tremendous amount of them" since "they really have no hope" of "fall[ing] in love" in a way "sanctioned by the church" which is "a very difficult thing". Holland stated that he does not "anticipate that [the church] would change [its position] on homosexual behavior" and that "gay or lesbian inclinations" will "not exist post-mortality". He also used uses the phrase "struggling with gender identity" and "gender confusion" as synonyms for homosexuality.
- March – The US Associated Press discussed the first potential excommunication of an LDS Church member for being in a legal same-sex marriage. Buckley Jeppson's stake president pressured him to resign or face a disciplinary council. After the article ran, however, the council did not happen.
- April – The church published an extensive interview with Oaks and general authority Lance B. Wickman in April to clarify the church's stance on homosexuality. In the interview, Wickman states that the church "doesn't counsel against" conversion therapy and that it "may be appropriate" for an individual to use clinical therapy to seek to diminish or eliminate homosexual feelings. However, Oaks states they "can't endorse" the "aversive therapies" recommended in the past to fix "this affliction" and they "don't accept responsibility for those abuses" suffered by individuals who had experienced this now disavowed therapy method. On same-sex civil unions and domestic partnerships, Oaks states that giving these couples the same government rights given to a man and woman marriage is "not right" and "not appropriate". He added that a mixed-orientation marriage would be appropriate for a gay member who could "deal with [homosexual] feelings" and "put them in the background" and felt a "great attraction" to someone of the opposite sex. They compared devout homosexual Mormons to those with physical or mental disabilities who will also not be able to marry, and adds that "same-gender attraction did not exist in the pre-earth life and neither will it exist in the next life." As far as family acceptance and inclusion of homosexual children they gave some example conversation lines like, "don't expect to stay overnight. Don't expect to be a lengthy house guest. Don't expect us to take you out and introduce you to our friends, or to deal with you in a public situation that would imply our approval of your 'partnership'." He further stated "the Lord's way is to love the sinner while condemning the sin".
- April – In April apostle Russell M. Nelson signed a letter with other religious leaders urging the US government to pass an amendment banning same-sex marriage stating it would be the "only measure that will adequately protect marriage" from "redefinition". On May 25 the First Presidency released another statement supporting the amendment and urging members to contact their senators who would be voting on the measure on June 6.
- June – ABC News Nightline featured interviews with gay, formerly LDS men in which they stated that they felt alone, like there was no place for them in the church, and that they were recovering from put-downs and discrimination in the church. This elicited a response from the LDS Church's newsroom which quoted previous leaders' statements that, "We reach out to assist people with all of the challenges of life. Those who struggle with same-gender attraction are certainly not excluded from the circle of love and fellowship the Church hopes to provide."
- June – BYU fired adjunct professor Jeffrey Nielsen for writing an opinion piece in support of same-sex marriage.
- September – Prominent gay member Mitch Maybe stated that he had been told by church leaders that he was unworthy to ever take the sacrament, will never work with church youth, and that it is because of people like him that the AIDS pandemic had come and that his sins were bringing punishment to wicked and innocent people.
- October – Apostle Oaks gave an October General Conference address in which he quotes a man saying "change is possible" but do not "focus on the causes of same-gender attraction". Oaks then continues explaining if "faith", "prayers" and "priesthood" do not "heal you from an affliction" that the "Atonement will surely give you the strength to bear the burden."
- November – Facing East by Carol Lynn Pearson premiered in Utah. The play tells the story of a young gay Latter-day Saint man who committed suicide at Temple Square, his experiences, and the grieving of his parents.

=== 2007 ===
- 2007 – North Star International was founded as a support for members who experience homosexual attractions, and did not take a position on the origins or mutability of those feelings.
- January – No More Goodbyes: Circling the Wagons around Our Gay Loved Ones was published by Latter-Day Saint Carol Lynn Pearson. The book tells various stories of families with LGBTQ loved ones and how that affects their faith.
- April – The church's BYU Board of Trustees, under the direction of First Presidency member Monson, revised the BYU Honor Code in April to clarify that "one's stated same-gender attraction is not an Honor Code issue" while continuing to ban "all forms of physical intimacy that give expression to homosexual feelings".

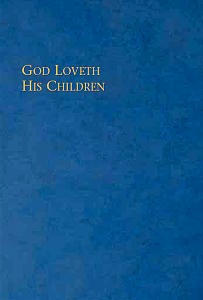
This was the first church publication on homosexuality produced in nearly three decades for members to read since "To the One" and "A Letter to a Friend" were released in 1978.

- May – Seventy Bruce C. Hafen addressed the 4th World Congress of Families in Poland on same-sex marriage. Additionally, BYU Law professor Lynn D. Wardle presented and compared his warnings "tragic consequences" and "dangers of legalizing same-sex marriage" as the warnings of a Hungarian man warning Elie Wiesel's town about the dangers the incoming Nazis posed to the Jewish population there. He also stated that if same-sex marriages were legalized there would be no basis to deny polygamous or incestuous marriages, and a decreased ability to "protect their children from exposure to gay propaganda."
- July – The church published the booklet "God Loveth His Children" addressed to gay members, teaching that through effort, faith, and the Atonement their feelings of same-sex attractions could be overcome in this life or their bodies would be perfected and freed from the challenge of same-gender attractions in the next.
- September – Church seventy Douglas Callister spoke at an Evergreen conference and urged listeners to battle their challenge of "same-gender inclinations" and thoughts through prayer, fasting, and taking the sacrament.
- October – The church published the article "Helping Those Who Struggle with Same-Gender Attraction" by apostle Holland in the October Ensign and Liahona magazines.
- November – The church's newspaper published anonymous stories of several homosexual Mormon men. One often pleaded with God to be straight and was suicidal, and another was promised by his stake president that if he married a woman and had sex that his attractions to men would "go away."

=== 2008 ===
- 2008 – Apostles discussed the question of whether members should consider using "new drugs and gene therapy" to "counter homosexuality" in a leaked video.

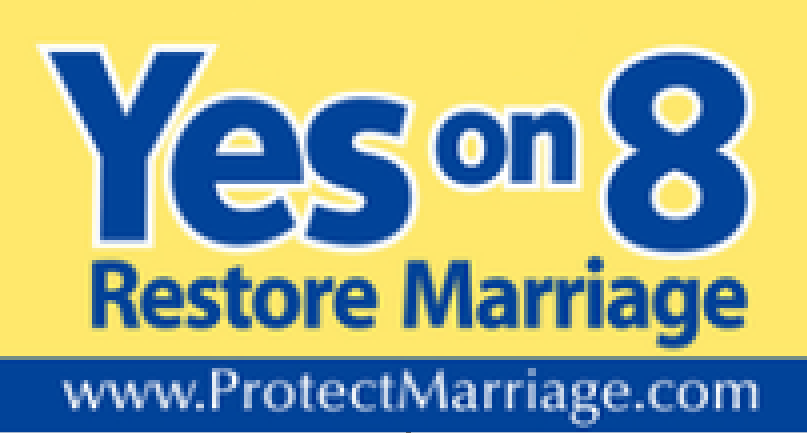
The church distributed hundreds of thousands of these Protect Marriage Coalition lawn signs during their involvement with the pro-Proposition 8 campaign.

- 2008 – Church Relief Society President Chieko Okazaki stated in her book that, "A family with a gay child is not a failed family. It's a family with a member who needs special love and understanding and who has love and understanding to give back."
- June – The First Presidency again urged California members to "do all you can ... by donating of your means and time" to pass a state amendment banning same-sex marriage in a letter.
- October – Apostles Ballard and Cook and member of the Presidency of the Seventy Clayton gave a satellite broadcast to all California members. In it they asked members to donate "four hours per week" and to "set aside Saturdays between now and the election from nine in the morning until two in the afternoon to participate in calling, walking, and other assignments" to oppose same-sex marriage and pass Proposition 8. They clarified that to the church tolerance means forgiveness but does not mean "tolerating transgression", and noted the existence of temple-worthy members who "struggle with this great challenge" of "same gender attractions". Additionally, a video of the apostle Bednar answering the questions of some youth was shown off of the church's new official website PreservingMarriage.org. Members were directed to register on the coalition website ProtectMarriage.com.

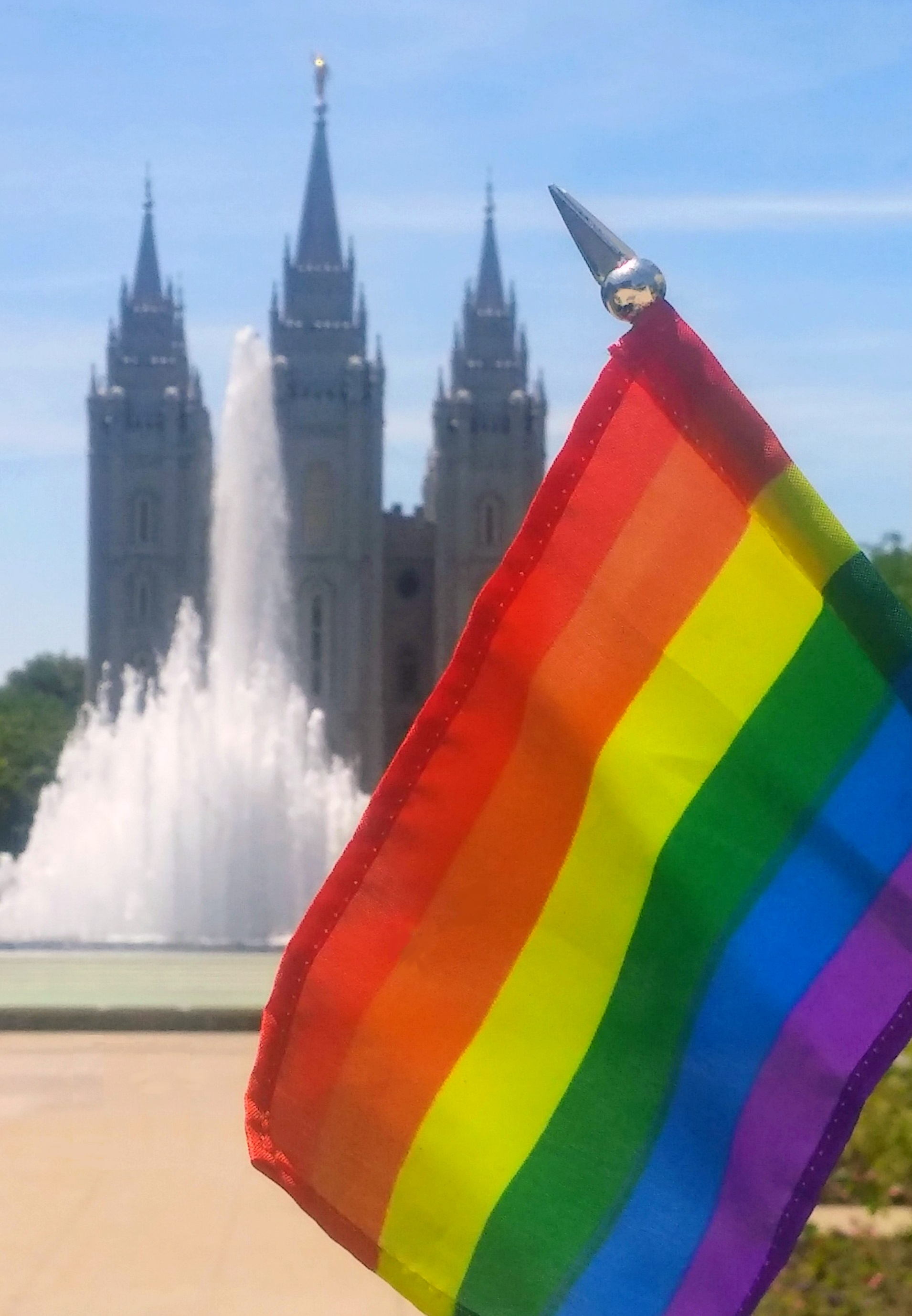
Nearly five thousand protesters gathered at the Salt Lake Temple after the passing of Proposition 8.

- November – The Courage Campaign produced a controversial California-aired television ad depicting Mormon missionaries invading a lesbian couple's house and taking their rings and marriage license. The ad elicited a statement from a church spokesperson. The group also created a petition asking the LDS church to stop funding and advocating for Proposition 8, which gained over 16,000 signatures.
- November – After the 4 November 2008 close passing of California's Proposition 8 banning same-sex marriage in which the LDS church was heavily involved, over two thousand protesters gathered at the Los Angeles LDS temple on November 6. The next day nearly five thousand protesters gathered at the Salt Lake Temple. That evening a candlelight vigil by about 600 mothers of LGBT children was also held at the Salt Lake Temple.
- November – After the passing of Proposition 8 Seventy L. Whitney Clayton stated that the church does not oppose benefits like health insurance and property rights for same-sex civil unions or domestic partnerships.
- November – A chapter of an activist group called for vandalizing LDS meetinghouses in response to their political involvement with Proposition 8. Some Bash Back! members spray painted slogans chapels and put glue in the locks. More moderate gay rights groups condemned the actions of the Bash Back! group.

=== 2009 ===
- 2009 – The church produces a training video for Family Services entitled "Providing psychological care to those with unwanted homosexual attraction".
- January – Encouraging Heterosexuality was published by Latter-Day Saints Douglas A. Abbott and A. Dean Byrd. The book discusses ideal family situations for children to grow up in so that they don’t develop homosexual feelings.
- February – LDS bishop and state senator Chris Buttars was removed from a Senate committee for breaking an agreement not to talk about LGBT topics after anti-gay comments he made became public. He had given a controversial interview to gay former Mormon Reed Cowan in his office with the Book of Mormon sitting on his desk for the upcoming 8: The Mormon Proposition documentary. In the interview Buttars stated that gay people have no morals and are "the meanest buggers" and "probably the greatest threat to America." He also stated that they are like radical Muslims, that there families are "combinations of abominations," and that their "number one goal is to proselyte the youth."
- August – Then apostle Russell M. Nelson spoke against same-sex marriage at the World Congress of Families held in Amsterdam.
- September – Bruce C. Hafen of the First Quorum of the Seventy addressed members of Evergreen International at its 19th annual conference, which was held in the church's Joseph Smith Memorial Building and stated, "If you are faithful, on resurrection morning—and maybe even before then—you will rise with normal attractions for the opposite sex. Some of you may wonder if that doctrine is too good to be true. But Elder Dallin H. Oaks has said it MUST be true" (emphasis in original).
- November – Church PR director Michael Otterson gave a statement at a Salt Lake City Council hearing in support of a proposed city anti-discrimination ordinance which would protect LGBT individuals.

== See also ==
- Homosexuality and The Church of Jesus Christ of Latter-day Saints
- Law of adoption (Mormonism)
- LGBT rights in Utah
- LGBT Mormon suicides
- List of Christian denominational positions on homosexuality
- Mormonism in the 21st century
- Sexuality and Mormonism
