= LGBTQ rights and the LDS Church =

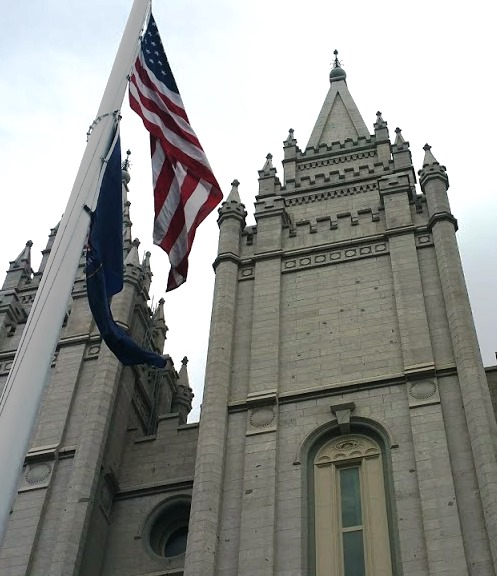
The LDS Church has held notable political influence on laws around LGBT individuals in the United States, especially in the state of Utah.

The Church of Jesus Christ of Latter-day Saints (LDS Church) has been involved with many pieces of legislation relating to LGBT people and their rights (e.g. housing, job discrimination, and same-sex marriage). These include playing an important role in defeating same-sex marriage legalization in Hawaii (Amendment 2), Alaska (Measure 2), Nebraska (Initiative 416), Nevada (Question 2), California (Prop 22), and Utah (Amendment 3). The topic of same-sex marriage has been one of the church's foremost public concerns since 1993. Leaders have stated that it will become involved in political matters if it perceives that there is a moral issue at stake and wields considerable influence on a national level. Over a dozen members of the US congress had membership in the church in the early 2000s. About 80% of Utah state lawmakers identied as Mormon at that time as well. The church's political involvement around LGBT rights has long been a source of controversy both within and outside the church. It's also been a significant cause of disagreement and disaffection by members.

== Teachings on sexuality and gender identity motivating political involvement ==
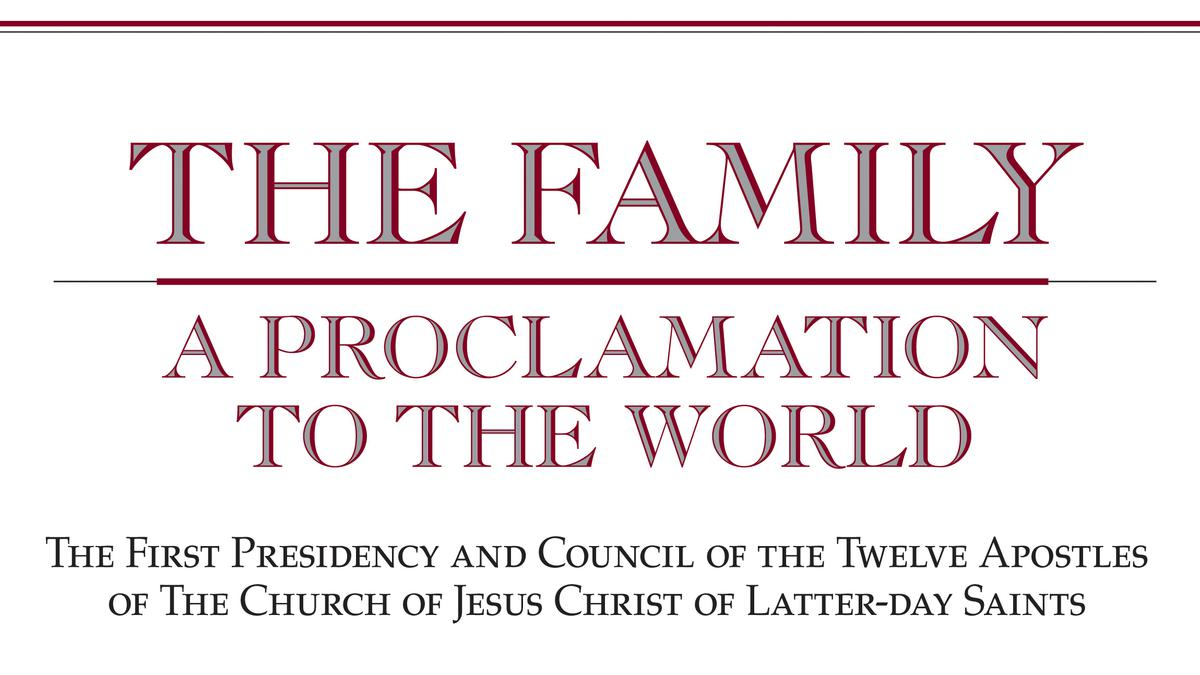
"The Family: A Proclamation to the World" is a 1995 LDS church statement used as a legal document in several court case amicus briefs opposing same-sex marriage.

LDS Church leaders have stated that the church will become involved in political matters if it perceives that there is a moral issue at stake, such as same-sex marriage, and the church wields considerable influence in the United States. All homosexual or same-sex sexual activity is forbidden by the LDS Church in its law of chastity, and the church teaches that God does not approve of same-sex marriage. Additionally, in the church's plan of salvation, noncelibate gay and lesbian individuals will not be allowed in the top tier of heaven to receive exaltation unless they repent, and a heterosexual marriage is a requirement for exaltation. In 1995 Church president Gordon B. Hinckley read "The Family: A Proclamation to the World" in the Fall General Conference which states that marriage between a man and a woman is essential and ordained of God and that gender is an essential part of one's eternal identity and purpose. Gender identity and roles play an important part in Latter-Day Saint teachings which teaches a strict binary of spiritual gender as literal offspring of divine parents. "The Family Proclamation" has been submitted by the church in several amicus briefs as evidence against legalizing same-sex marriages.

From 1976 until 1989 under president Spencer Kimball the Church Handbook called for church discipline for members attracted to the same sex equating merely being homosexual with the seriousness of acts of adultery and child molestation—even celibate gay people were subject to excommunication. Kimball's numerous publications discussing "curing" homosexuality and condemning same-sex attractions (even without action), and his rise to the church presidency in 1973 set the stage for years of harsh treatment of gay church members. Since the first recorded mentions of homosexuality by general LDS Church leaders, teachings and policies around the topics of the nature, etiology, mutability, and identity around same-sex romantic and physical attractions have seen many changes through the decades, including a softening in rhetoric over time.

== Views on discrimination laws ==
In February 2003, the LDS Church said it did not oppose a hate-crimes bill, which included sexual orientation, then under consideration in the Utah state legislature. The church opposes same-sex marriage, but does not object to rights regarding hospitalization and medical care, fair housing and employment rights, or probate rights, so long as these do not infringe on the integrity of the family or the constitutional rights of churches and their adherents to administer and practice their religion free from government interference. Following two months of negotiations between top Utah gay rights leaders and mid-level church leaders, the church supported a gay rights bill in Salt Lake City which bans discrimination on the basis of sexual orientation and gender identity in housing and employment, calling them "common-sense rights." The law does not apply to housing or employment provided by religious organizations. Jeffrey R. Holland, of the church's Quorum of the Twelve Apostles, stated that it could be a model for the rest of the state. The LDS Church has not taken a position on ENDA.

Many surveys have been conducted on church members and their views on homosexuality and discrimination. In a 1977 Utah poll three-fourths of LDS-identified responders opposed equal rights for gay teachers or ministers and 62% favored discrimination against gays in business and government (versus 64% and 38% of non-LDS respondents respectively). A 2017 Public Religion Research Institute (PRRI) survey found that over half (53%) of all Mormon adults believed small private business should be able to deny products and services to gay or lesbian people for religious reasons (compared to 33% of the 40,000+ American adults surveyed), and 24% of all Mormon adults oppose laws that protect LGBT Americans against discrimination in employment, housing, and public accommodations. In a 2007 US poll, only 24% of Mormons agreed that "homosexuality is a way of life that should be accepted," less than any other major religious group in the survey except for Jehovah's Witnesses, and 2 out of 3 (68%) latter-day saints said it should be discouraged. In a similar poll seven years later, 36% said homosexuality should be accepted and over half (57%) said it should be discouraged. Additionally, 69% of adherents supported laws that protect LGBT Americans against discrimination in employment, housing, and public accommodations, but 53% believed small private business should be able to deny products and services to gay or lesbian people for religious reasons.

Several church employees have been fired or pressured to leave for being celibate but gay, or for supporting LGBT rights. A Church employee described how his stake president denied his temple recommend resulting in him getting fired simply because of his friendship with other gay men and his involvement in a charity bingo for Utah Pride in a 2011 article published by QSaltLake.

== Opposition to same-sex marriage legislation ==
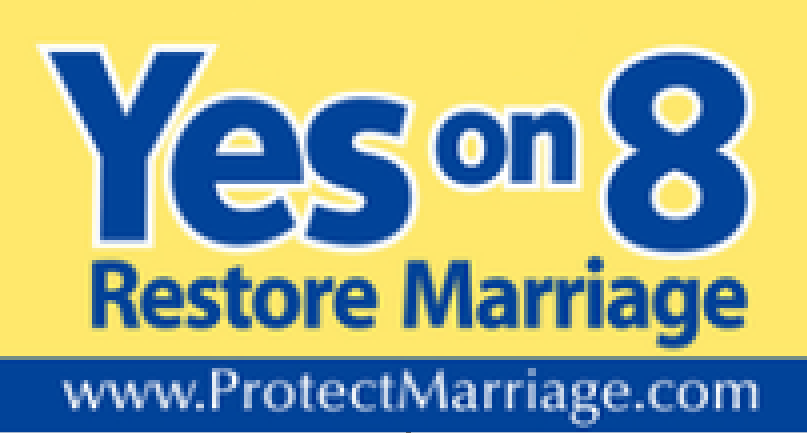
The church distributed hundreds of thousands of these Protect Marriage Coalition lawn signs during their involvement with the pro-Prop 8 campaign.

Beginning in the mid-1990s, the LDS Church began to focus its attention on the issue of same-sex marriages with one scholar citing the church's views of God's male-female union plan, their sense of responsibility in publicly protecting traditional morality, and a fear of government encroachment in church performed marriages as the motivations for this opposition. In 1999 California members were urged to "to do all you can by donating your means and time" in opposition to a same-sex marriage state initiative. The apostle M. Russell Ballard has said the church is "locked in" if anything interferes with the principle of marriage only being between a man and a woman. In 1993, the Supreme Court of Hawaii held that discrimination against same-sex couples in the granting of marriage licenses violated the Hawaiian constitution. In response, the church's First Presidency issued a statement on February 13, 1994, declaring their opposition to same-sex marriage, and urging members to support efforts to outlaw it. Fund-raising assignments were given to stake presidents in Hawaii and the LDS Church contributed $600,000 to pass HB 117. With the lobbying of the LDS Church and several other religious organizations, the Hawaii legislature enacted the bill in 1994 outlawing same-sex marriages.

Other states were considering legislation against recognizing same-sex marriages, but Utah acted first in 1995. With its large majority Latter-day Saint legislature it passed a law forbidding the recognition of same-sex marriage that was drafted by a Brigham Young University BYU law professor. In 1995, the LDS Church released "The Family: A Proclamation to the World" reaffirming its stance that marriage is between one man and one woman. However, this monogamous stance has been strongly criticized as hypocritical given the church's historical disagreement with this legal definition which bars polygamy. In 1998, the church donated $500,000 towards banning same-sex marriage in Alaska (Measure 2). This made up nearly 80% of the entire budget of the coalition lobbying for the measure. The same year in Nebraska, church members collected about half of the 160,000 signatures gathered to place Initiative 416 on the ballot in order to ban same-sex marriage there. For Nevada's Question #2 members played a key role in passing it by collecting the necessary petition signatures with many collected by making use of the church directories and venues.

In 2004, the church officially endorsed a federal amendment to the United States Constitution as well as Utah Constitutional Amendment 3 banning any marriages not between one man and one woman and announced its opposition to political measures that "confer legal status on any other sexual relationship" than "a man and a woman lawfully wedded as husband and wife." This statement seemed to also oppose civil unions, common-law marriages, plural marriages, or other family arrangements. This political involvement elicited the criticism of California Senator Mark Leno who questioned whether the church's tax-exempt status should be revoked.

On August 13, 2008, the church released a letter explaining why it believed that same-sex marriage would be detrimental to society and encouraging California members to support Proposition 8 which would bar anything but opposite-sex marriages. The letter asked members to donate time and money towards the initiative. Church members would account for 80 to 90 percent of volunteers who campaigned door-to-door and as much as half of the nearly $40 million raised during the campaign. In November 2008, the day after California voters approved Proposition 8, the LDS Church stated that it does not object to domestic partnership or civil union legislation as long as these do not infringe on the integrity of the traditional family or the constitutional rights of churches. Soon after, L. Whitney Clayton, a church general authority, stated that members who opposed Proposition 8 may be subject to discipline from local church leaders. In a special meeting for some Oakland, California members it was reported that Marlin K. Jensen, Church Historian and general authority, apologized to straight and gay members for their pain from the Proposition 8 campaign and some other church actions around homosexuality. In 2010 the LDS Church was fined for failing to properly report about $37,000 in contributions in 2008 towards Prop 8. in violation of California state's political contribution laws. The whistleblower Fred Karger went on to found the organization Mormon Tips seeking information on further political involvement that may violate the LDS church's tax-exempt status.

On December 20, 2013, the topic of same-sex marriage and the LDS Church was raised again when U.S. District Judge Robert J. Shelby struck down the Utah ban on same-sex marriage, saying it violated the U.S. Constitution's Equal Protection Clause. In response, the church released instructions to leaders regarding same-sex marriage in Utah. These included the stance that, while the church disagrees with the court ruling, those who obtain same-sex marriage should not be treated disrespectfully. Additionally, it stated that church leaders were prohibited from employing their authority to perform marriages, and that any church property could not be used for same-sex marriages or receptions.

In November 2015, a new policy was released stating that members who are in a same-sex marriage are considered apostates and may be subject to church discipline. Additionally, the children of parents who are in same-sex relationships must wait until they are 18 years old and then disavow homosexual relationships before they can be baptized. In April 2019, the church's First Presidency announced a revelation reversing the policy, but still affirming that same-sex marriage was a "serious transgression." Russell M. Nelson had previously characterized the 2015 policy as direction from God in 2016, stating "Each of us during that sacred moment felt a spiritual confirmation. ... It was our privilege as apostles to sustain what had been revealed to President Monson." Shortly after the change, Nelson said in a press release that the reversal was, "revelation upon revelation."

A 2017 PRRI survey found that over half (52%) of Mormon young adults (18–29) supported same-sex marriage while less than a third (32%) of Mormon seniors (65+) did. Overall, 40% of LDS adults supported same-sex marriage, and 53% were opposed.

The 2024 PRRI American Values Atlas survey found that 53% of all Latter-day Saint respondents supported same-sex marriage, up from 47% in 2023 and 27% in 2014.

== Criticism and Protests ==
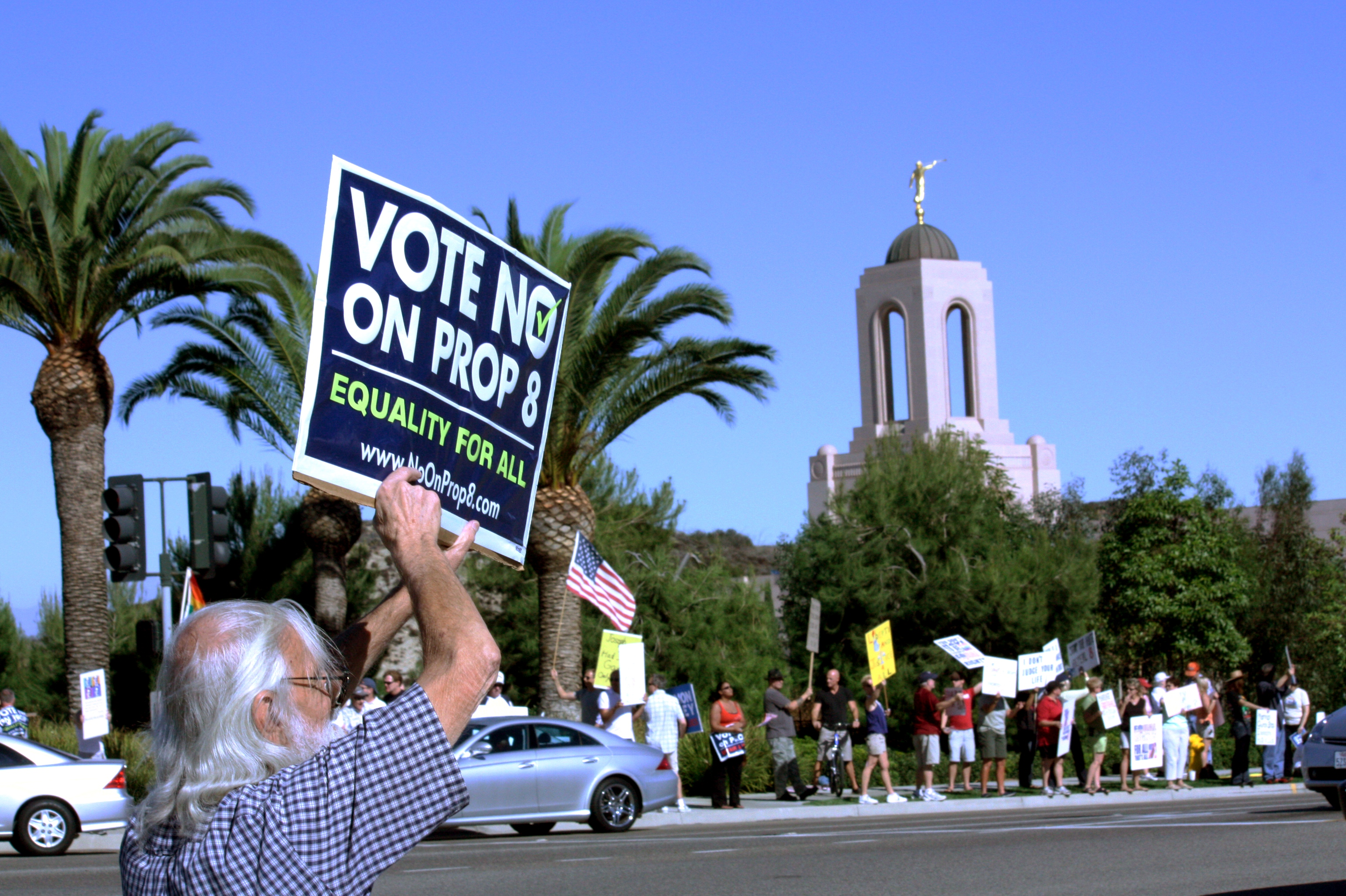
Protesters in front of the Newport Beach California Temple voicing their opposition to the church's support of Prop 8

The church's political involvement around LGBT rights has long been a source of controversy both within and outside the church. It's also been a significant cause of disagreement and disaffection by members. A 2003 nationwide Pew Research Center survey of over 1,000 LGBT Americans found that 83% of them said the LDS church was "generally unfriendly towards lesbian, gay, bisexual, and transgender people" surpassed only by "the Muslim religion" at 84%. Additionally, in May 2008 a Georgia Tech gay-rights manual referred to the LDS Church as "anti-gay." After two students sued the school for discrimination, a judge ordered that the material be removed. The church's political involvement around LGBTQ rights has sparked critical media and protests. This includes the 2010 documentary film 8: The Mormon Proposition, the play "8" and the following protests:

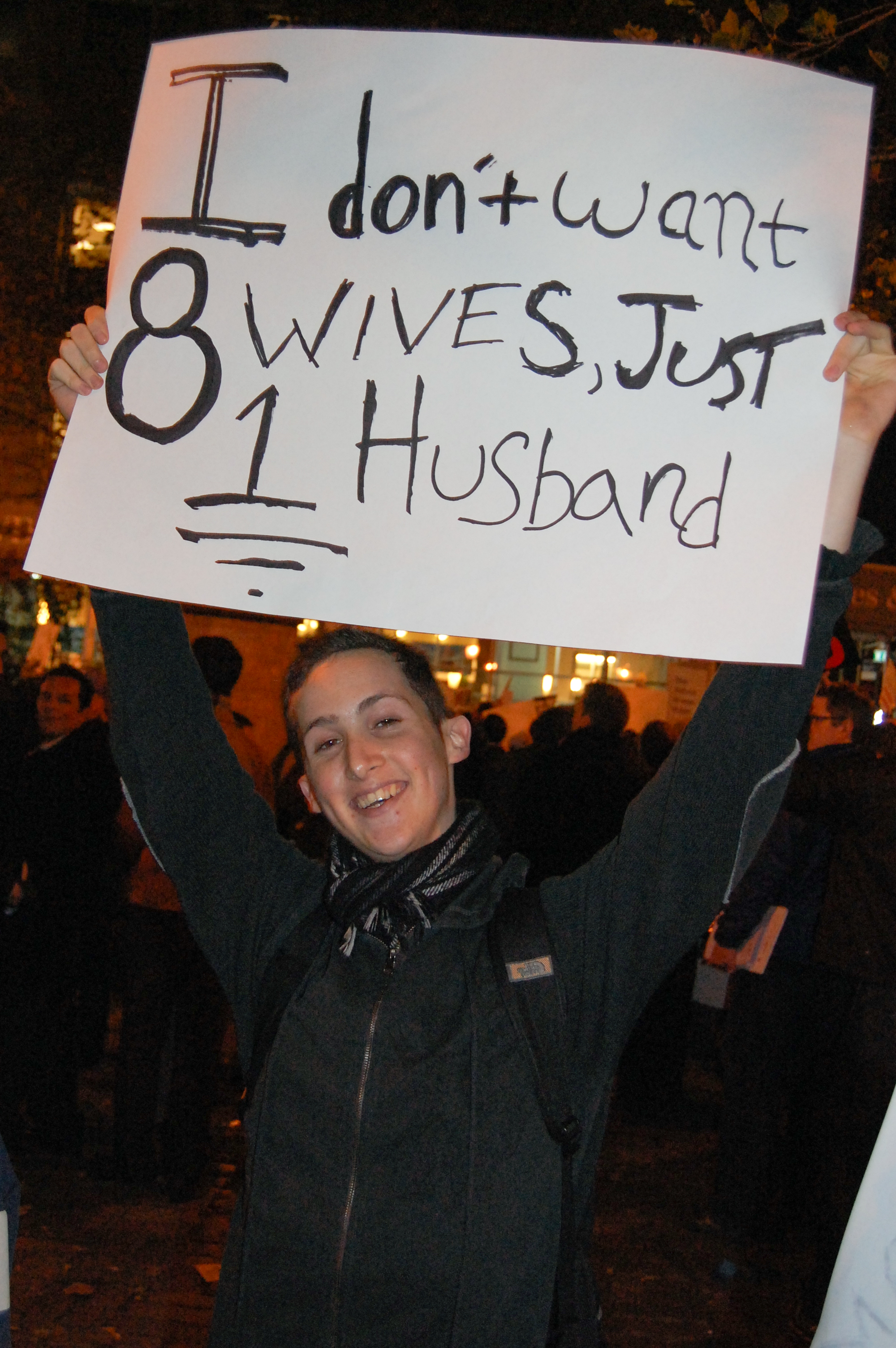
A Prop 8 protester with a sign referencing the LDS Church's polygamous history.

- 4 October 1999 – 150 members of Affirmation staged a protest in Salt Lake City over the church's lobbying and funding of anti-same-sex-marriage initiatives in California and other states.
- 2 November 2008 – Hundreds of people gathered at the Salt Lake City library in a protest of Prop 8 organized by LDS mothers of gay children.
- 6 November 2008 – In Los Angeles over two thousand people protested at the LDS temple over the LDS church's heavy involvement in the recent passing of California's Prop 8 banning same-sex marriage.
- 7 November 2008 – Three days after Prop 8 passed nearly five thousand protesters gathered at the Salt Lake Temple. That evening a candlelight vigil by about 600 mothers of LGBT children was also held at the Salt Lake Temple.

== Timeline of events and publications around the LDS church and LGBT rights ==
Below is a timeline of events and publications around LDS Church political involvement around LGBT rights.

=== 1800s ===
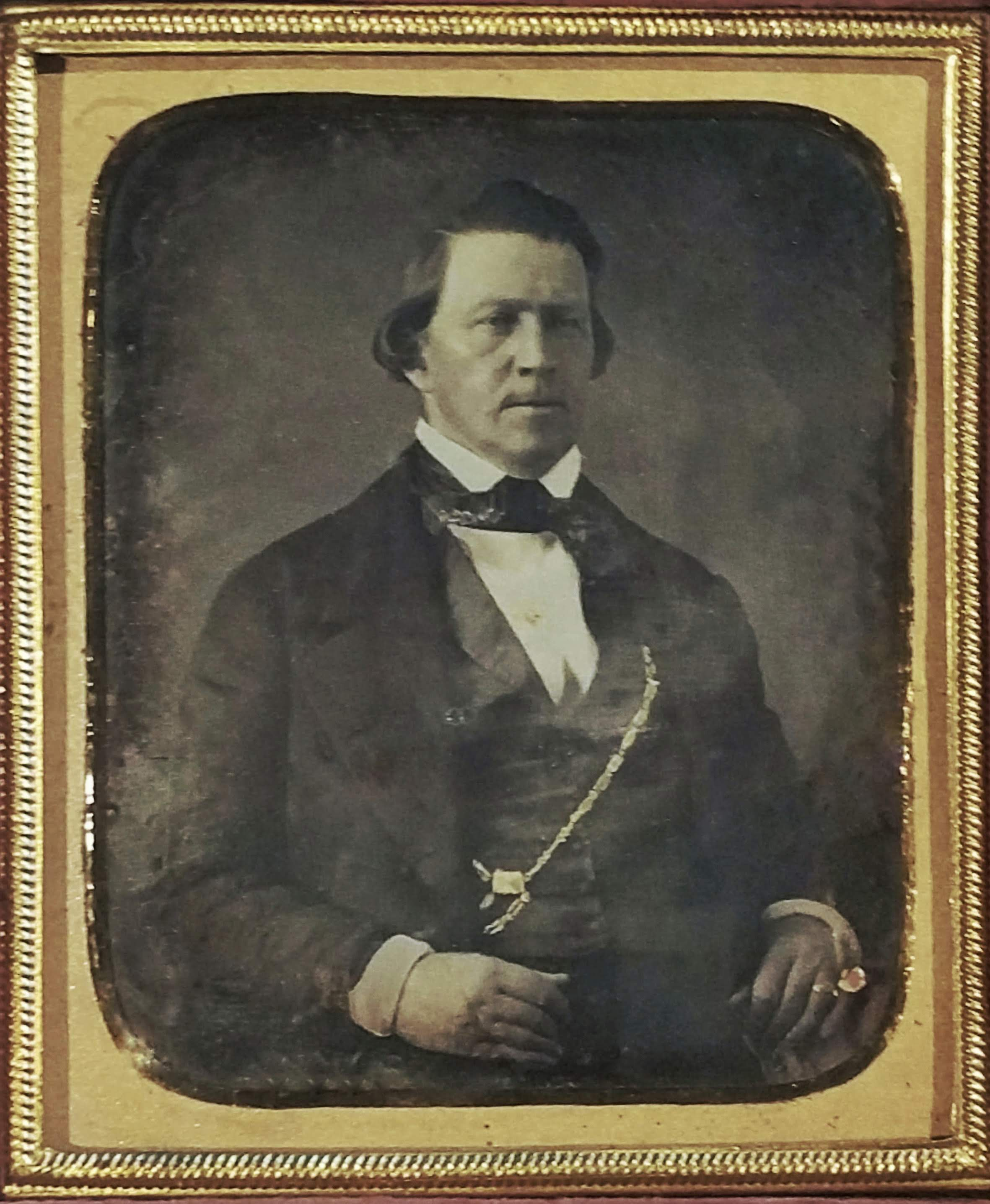
Brigham Young oversaw the creation of the new Utah Territory law banning sex between men. This portrait is from 1853.

- 1851 – The church-controlled legislature of the newly formed Utah Territory passed the first law addressing same-sex sexual behavior banning any "man or boy" from "sexual intercourse with any of the male creation" with penalties left to the courts' discretion. Brigham Young acted as both Utah governor and church president in the theocratic government and oversaw the selection of the legislators.
- 1858 – Travelling bishop and later church historian A. Milton Musser wrote that Salt Lake City member Almerin Grow had demonstrated odd behavior and was wearing his wife's clothing in one of the first reported instances of gender non-conforming dress in the Mormon community. Church president Young (who had only recently stepped down as governor of the Utah Territory) subsequently sent Grow south to "never return," so Grow appointed Musser as guardian of his daughter.
- 1897 – During the October General Conference, First Presidency member George Q. Cannon used the media attention on the 1895 conviction and two-year imprisonment of famed Irish poet Oscar Wilde as an opportunity to condemn homosexual behavior as an "abominable", "filthy", "nameless crime" that "caused the utter destruction of Sodom and Gomorrah". He continued stating that the only way to stop these "dreadful practices" was "by the destruction of those who practice them" and "for the Lord to wipe them out" noting that "if a little nest of them were left ... they would soon corrupt others".

=== 1950s ===
- 1952 – An increase in US public discourse around homosexuality in the McCarthyist Lavender scare era contributed to the first explicit mention of the term homosexual in general conference. Apostle Clark lamented that homosexuality is found among men and women, and that homosexual people exercise great influence in shaping culture. After this LDS leaders started regularly addressing queer topics in public especially towards the end of the decade.
- 1955 – A Boise, Idaho, gay witch hunt was launched to hunt down gay men among moral panic over several local arrests of males for same-sex sexual activity. This resulted in nearly 1,500 people questioned, producing hundreds of names of suspected homosexuals including several Mormons. Author John Gerassi cites an oppressive environment engendered by the predominantly LDS population in his seminal 1966 work Boys of Boise as a contributing factor for the illegal sexual activity and subsequent witch hunts. The documentary The Fall of '55 was made about the events in 2006.
- 1957 – Apostle Clark cited Old Testament punishments for same-sex sexual activity stating, "for homosexuality, it was death to the male and the prescription or penalty for the female I do not know."
- 1959 – The fictional book Advise and Consent is released featuring the story of a married Mormon US senator named Brigham Anderson from Utah who has an affair with another man. It won a Pulitzer Prize and was later made into a film in 1962. The novel's plot takes place during the ongoing 1950s McCarthyist Lavender Scare era when thousands of lesbian and gay applicants were barred from federal employment as national security threats under President Eisenhower's Executive Order 10450, and over 5,000 federal employees were fired under suspicions of being homosexual.

=== 1960s ===
- 1960 – Utah native and LDS-raised R. Joel Dorius (born 1919) would become an unwitting champion of gay liberation after he was arrested in Massachusetts along with two coworkers and fired from his language and visual arts Smith College professorship. His house was raided and beefcake fitness magazines with erotic images of men were found in what is now considered a McCarthyist gay witch hunt. Along with a coworker, Dorius appealed the verdict of pornography possession to the Massachusetts Supreme Judicial Court and all three professors were exonerated as the raid warrants were deemed unconstitutional. The scandal has been dramatized in The Scarlet Professor and the PBS documentary The Great Pink Scare.
- 1964 – Apostle Kimball addressed seminary and institute faculty on BYU campus calling homosexuality a "detestable crime against nature" that was "curable" by "self mastery". He cited one lay bishop (a businessman by trade) assigned by the church to administer a "program of rehabilitation" through which there had been "numerous cures". He said "the police, the courts, and the judges" had referred "many cases directly" to the church.
- 1965 – In a churchwide broadcast address the apostle Mark Petersen cited the movements to remove laws banning same-sex sexual activity in at least two US states as great evidence of apostasy, rejecting God, and society placing itself in the role of anti-Christ.
- 1969 – Mark E. Petersen cites how homosexuality "was made a capital crime in the Bible" as evidence of the seriousness of same-sex sexual activity. He stated "immorality is next to murder" and "the wage of sin is death" and that a rejection of morality "may bring about [this nation's] fall" as with "Greece and Rome" unless there was repentance.

=== 1970s ===
- 1970 – Victor L. Brown of the Presiding Bishopric gave a General Conference address in which he called recent media reporting on a same-sex marriage "filth on our newsstands".
- 1971 – In a conference address apostle Kimball called the decriminalization of consensual same-sex sexual activity a damnable heresy, and referred to the voices speaking in favor of churches accepting homosexuals as ugly and loud.
- 1972 – Idaho laws which barred same-sex sexual activity between consenting adults were reinstated under heavy pressure from the LDS church after being repealed for three months. Mormon state senator Wayne Loveless who spearheaded the effort stated that the previous law would "encourage immorality and draw sexual deviates to the state." The reinstated law restored the old wording that "every person who is guilty of the infamous crime against nature committed with mankind ... is punishable by imprisonment in the state prison for not less than five years."
- 1974 – BYU president Oaks delivered a speech on campus in which he spoke in favor of keeping criminal punishment for "deviate sexual behavior" such as private, consensual, same-sex sexual activity. The speech was later printed by the university's press.

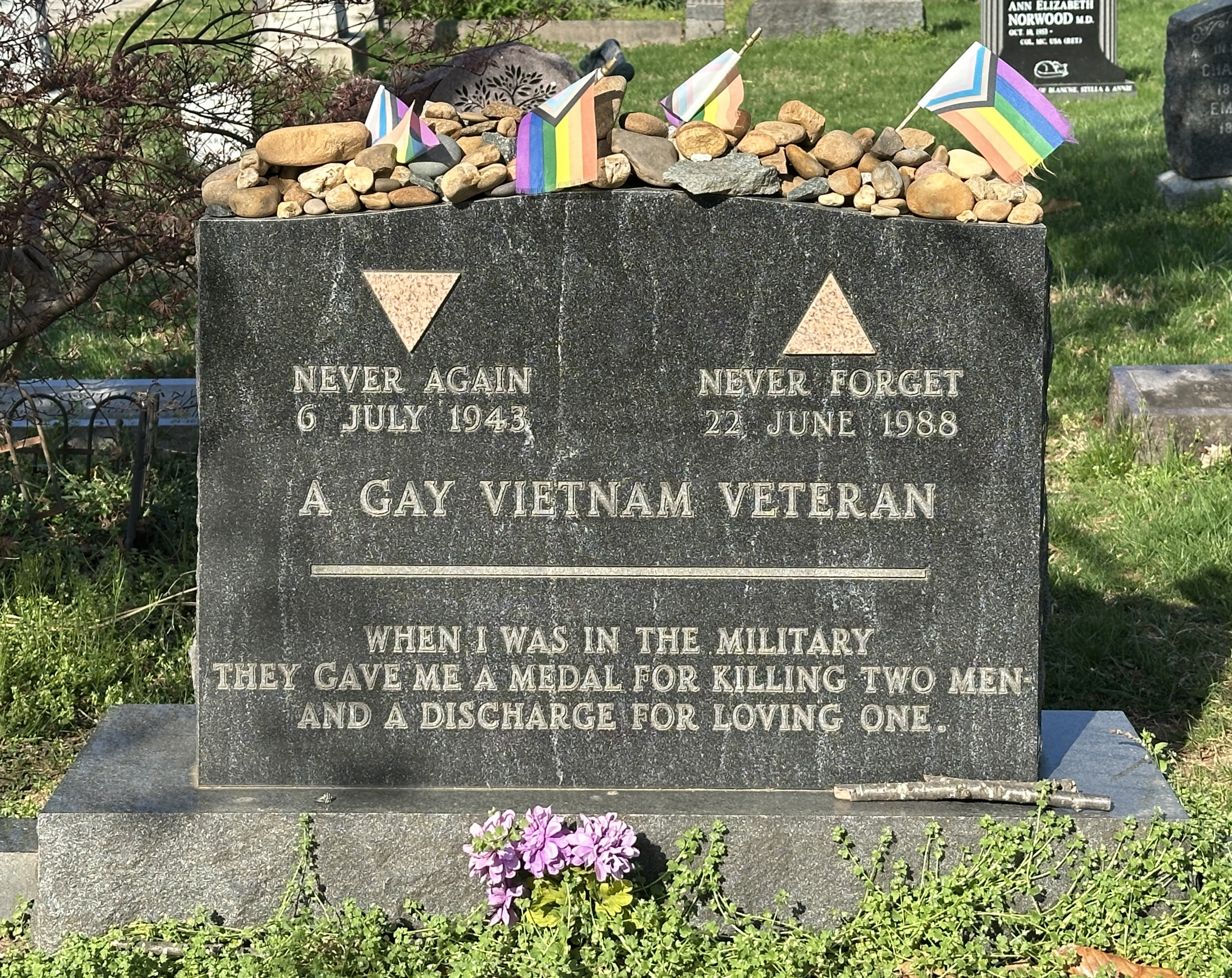
Sergeant Matlovich, was awarded a Bronze Star Medal for heroic service in the Vietnam War, but was discharged from the military and excommunicated from the LDS church for being gay.

- 1975 – LDS member Sergeant Leonard Matlovich was featured on the September 8 cover of Time magazine with the caption "I Am a Homosexual" for his challenging of the U.S. military ban against gay men and lesbian women. He was subsequently discharged from the military for openly stating his sexual orientation and excommunicated from the Church two months after the article was released.
- 1976 – BYU music professor Carlyle D. Marsden took his own life two days after being outed by an arrest during a series of police sting operations at an Orem rest stop.
- 1977 – The largely LDS Utah House of Representatives passed a bill outlawing same-sex marriages in the state by 71 votes to 3 without floor debate.
- 1977 – The Relief Society general president sent a telegram to Anita Bryant for her "Save Our Children" campaign which stated, "On behalf of the one million members of the Relief Society ... we commend you, for your courageous and effective efforts in combatting [sic] homosexuality and laws which would legitimize this insidious life style [sic]."
- 1977 – Under the name Affirmation: Gay Mormons United, the first Affirmation group was organized in Salt Lake City by a group of other Mormon and former-Mormon lesbian and gay people at the conference for the Salt Lake Coalition for Human Rights.

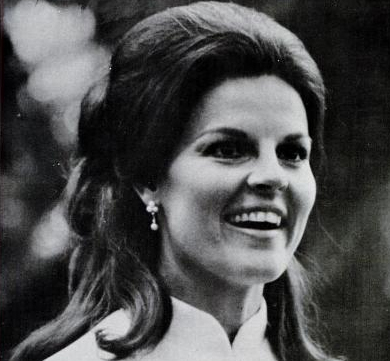
Anita Bryant's anti-gay campaign visit to Salt Lake City, applauded by LDS church leaders, sparked the first public protest by Utah's LGBTQ community.

- 1977 – Apostle Mark Petersen wrote in the Church News that every right-thinking should sustain Anita Bryant and should look at their own neighborhoods to determine how "infiltrated" they had become with gay people. He also wrote that "homosexual offenses" were next to murder in the hierarchy of sins.
- 1977 – With an invitation from LDS church leaders, Anita Bryant performed at the Utah State Fair on the 18th. Her presence prompted the first public demonstration from Utah's queer community, organized by gay, former-Mormon pastor Bob Waldrop, in what gay, former Mormon, and historian Seth Anderson referred to as "Utah's Stonewall."
- 1977 – At a backstage press conference Church president Kimball praised Anita Bryant's anti-gay "Save Our Children" crusade which sought to bar the passing of nondiscrimination laws which would protect sexual minorities from being kicked out of their homes, fired from their jobs, and banned from restaurants solely for their sexual orientation. He stated that she was "doing a great service." He continued stating that "the homosexual program is not a natural, normal way of life" and that church bishops and college-educated church counselors can aid those with "homosexual problems."

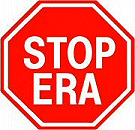
The church opposed the ERA in part from believing it would lead to same-sex marriage and parenting.

- 1978 – The First Presidency released a statement on August 24 outlining reasons for their opposition to the Equal Rights Amendment including "unnatural consequences" like an "increase in the practice of homosexual and lesbian activities".
- 1979 – Gay former Mormon Bob Waldrop who had served an LDS mission in Australia became a leader in the gay-inclusive Salt Lake Metropolitan Community Church. In February 1977 his congregation had had its permission rescinded by Utah state Lieutenant Governor David Monson (a Mormon) to hold a queer-inclusive church dance in the public Utah Capitol building.

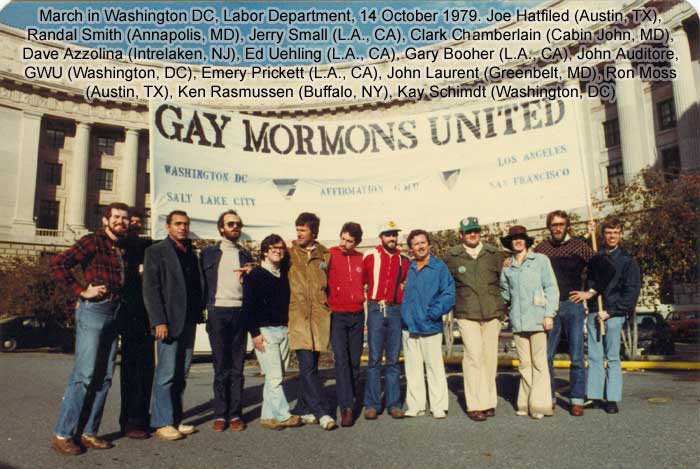
Gay Mormons at the National March on Washington for Lesbian and Gay Rights on 14 October 1979

- 1979 – Gay Mormons from Affirmation marched with 75,000 people in the National March on Washington for Lesbian and Gay Rights.

=== 1980s ===
- 1980 – The Ensign published an article stating that a passing of the Equal Rights Amendment would lead to legalizing same-sex marriage and children being raised in a homosexual home.
- 1981 – Church leaders sent every bishop and stake president a copy of a book on human sexuality and families by Church Welfare Services director Victor Brown Jr. The book stated that equating same-sex relationships with opposite-sex marriage was fallacious and inconsistent, and that homosexual people were less disciplined and orderly in their relationships.
- October – A march of about 15 gay post-Mormons calling themselves "Ethyl and Friends for Gay Rights" was given city permission to protest on public property around Temple Square during the church's general conference with signs like "We are God’s Children." The leader Randy Smith (whose drag performance name was Ethel) had previously undergone electroshock aversion therapy at BYU.
- 1984 – Apostle Oaks wrote a church memo that informed church action on LGBT legislation for more than three decades. In it he recommended the church make a public statement to "oppose job discrimination laws protecting homosexuals" unless there were exceptions for allowing employers to "exclude homosexuals from employment that involves teaching ... young people". He also noted "the irony [that] would arise if the Church used [Reynolds v. United States]," the principal 1878 ruling stating that marriage is between a man and a woman, "as an argument for the illegality of homosexual marriages [since it was] formerly used against the Church to establish the illegality of polygamous marriages." Oaks also clarified that the word homosexuality is used in two senses: as a "condition" or "tendency", and as a "practice" or "activity".
- 1986 – Twenty-six-year-old Clair Harward who was dying from complications due to AIDS was banned from church meetings for fear of spreading the disease. His story made national headlines and prompted a statement from a church spokesperson.
- 1987 – Gordon Hinckley of the First Presidency gave a conference address in which he stated, "marriage between a man and a woman is ordained of God .... Marriage should not be viewed as a therapeutic step to solve problems such as homosexual inclinations ...."
- 1988 – On November 22 a 20-year-old man from a prominent Mormon family in Delta, Utah and another Utah man raped, tortured, and brutally murdered Gordon Church—a 28-year-old, gay, Mormon, student—near Cedar City, Utah in an anti-gay hate crime before US hate crime laws existed.

=== 1990s ===
- 1990 – Church spokesperson John Lyons stated, "Since there is no marriage between homosexuals, then sexual activity between them is not acceptable under our principles."
- 1991 – During a case hearing Young Men's president and church Seventy Jack H. Goaslind gave a testimonial and stated on record that "[the church] would withdraw" from the Boy Scouts of America if homosexual youth were allowed to join, implying a current church policy banning youth based on sexual orientation. In March 1910 the church's Young Men's Mutual Improvement Association had adopted the Boy Scouts of America program as the church-wide program for young men in the US.
- 1992 – Seventy Vaughn Featherstone decried the attempts at legalizing homosexuality during his lifetime as among compromising, drifting philosophies in his general conference speech.
- 1992 – Then apostle Russell Nelson stated in general conference that the AIDS epidemic was a plague fueled by a vocal few concerned with civil rights and abetted by immoral people.
- 1993 – Packer gave a speech in which he identified social and political unrest from gay-lesbian movements as major invasions into the membership of the Church that leads them away.
- 1993 – Apostle Oaks gave a conference address stating that "there are many political, legal, and social pressures for changes that confuse gender and homogenize the differences between men and women".
- 1994 – The First Presidency issued a statement encouraging members to contact their legislators in an effort to reject same-sex marriage.
- 1994 – Apostle Boyd K. Packer gave a conference address mentioning that changes in the laws around marriage and gender threaten the family.
- 1994 – Apostle James E. Faust gave a speech at BYU in which he stated that same-sex marriage would unravel families, the fabric of human society.
- 1995 – The LDS Church began actions opposing same-sex marriage laws including recruiting members to work with and donate to Hawaii's Future Today in opposition to efforts to legalize same-sex marriage in Hawaii. Pamphlets were spread in church meetings and church facilities were used to fax statements to legislative committees. The campaign spanned years and the church reported giving $600,000 in 1998 to the Hawaiian political-action group Save Traditional Marriage '98.
- 1995 – James E. Faust gave a First Presidency message that stated same-sex relationships would help "unravel the fabric of human society" and if practiced by everyone would "mean the end of the human family".

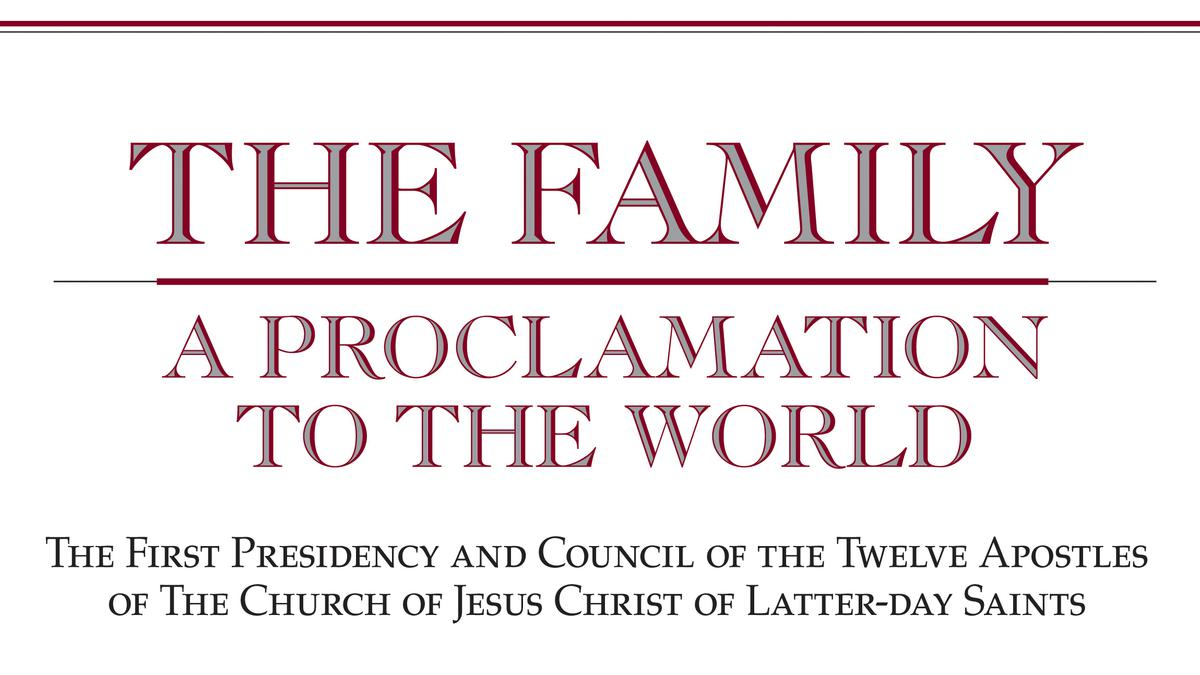
"The Family: A Proclamation to the World" is a 1995 LDS church statement used as a legal document in several court case amicus briefs opposing same-sex marriage.

- 1995 – Church president Gordon B. Hinckley read "The Family: A Proclamation to the World" in the Fall General Conference which states that marriage between a man and a woman is essential and ordained of God. It also teaches that gender is an essential part of one's eternal identity and purpose. The document has been submitted by the church in several amicus briefs as evidence against legalizing same-sex marriages.
- 1995 – Gordon B. Hinckley gave an October General Conference talk in which he stated that "same-sex marriage" is an "immoral practic[e]".
- 1995 – Church Seventy Durrel A. Woolsey stated in general conference that Satan makes powerful and ungodly proclamations like "same-gender intimate associations and even marriages are acceptable."
- 1996 – In California a letter was read to all congregations from the North American West Area Presidency encouraging members to contact their legislators in support of a California assembly bill (AB 1982) against the recognition of any same-sex marriages.

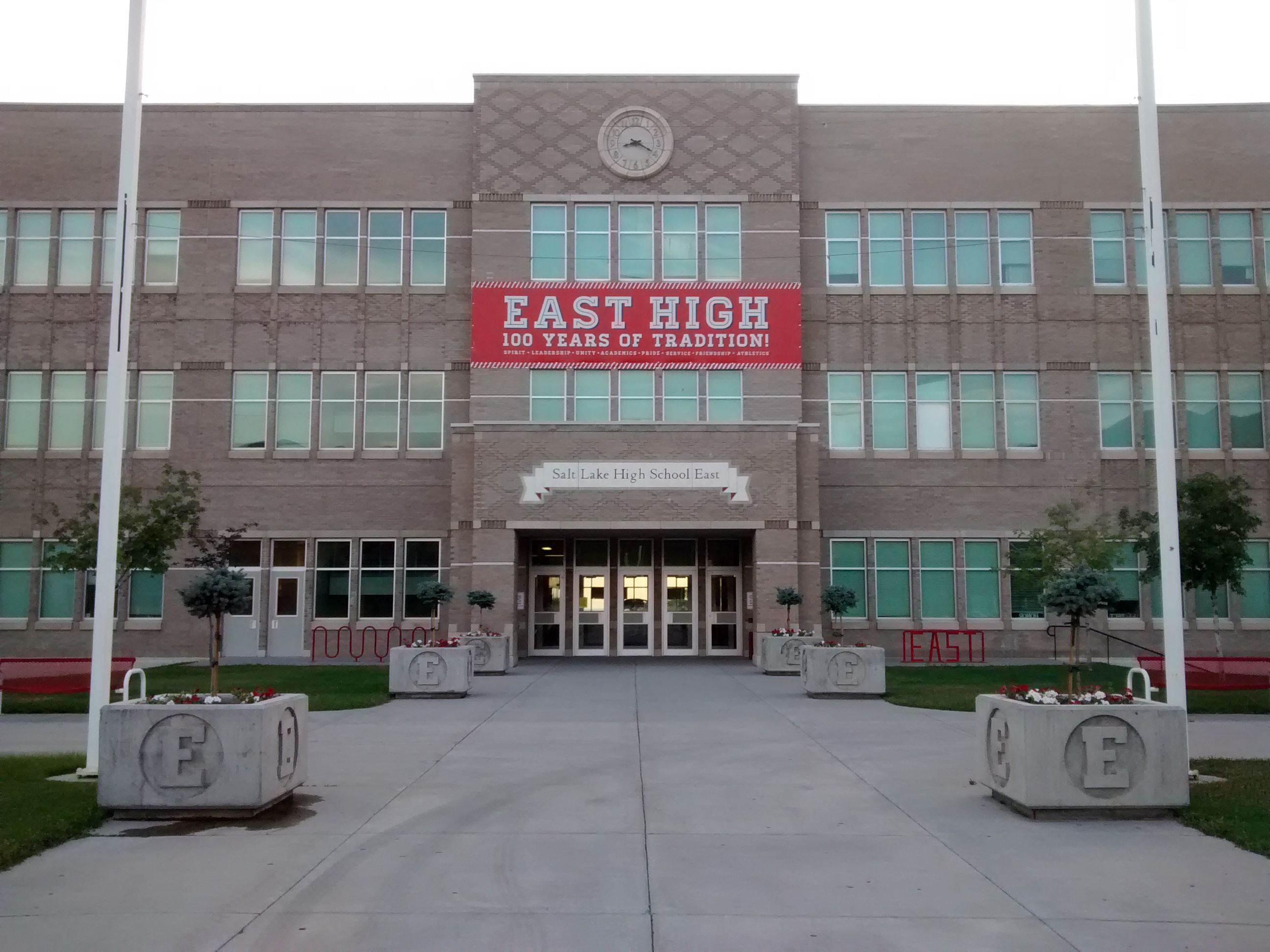
In 1996 a Salt Lake City high school became a focal point of tension between LGBT individuals and a largely LDS city administration and population.

- 1996 – Salt Lake City became the only US city to have its Board of Education ban all students clubs after Mormon students Erin Wiser and Kelli Peterson formed an East High School club called the "Gay/Straight Alliance" in September 1995. The club had cited a federal law sponsored by LDS Utah Senator Orrin Hatch which forbade school boards from discriminating against clubs, although, Hatch stated that the law was never meant to promote "immoral speech or activity". Four-hundred of Salt Lake's high school students protested the ban. One Mormon senior at East High was quoted stating that he would rather all clubs be banned than allow the gay-straight alliance. Additionally, Mormon state representative Grant Protzman stated “I think that many legislators have serious concerns about the group’s moving into recruitment of fresh meat for the gay population." Club founder Peterson responded that recruitment was not at all what the club is about, stating that it was founded to help her and her LGBT friends deal with a hostile school atmosphere where she faced physical and verbal assault as an out lesbian. In response to the gay-straight alliance group, some students at West High formed the Students Against Faggots Everywhere (SAFE) group.
- 1996 – BYU Spanish professor Thomas Matthews was reported to a top LDS authority for previously stating that he was gay in private conversations. He stated that BYU did not like that he was out of the closet despite being celibate and keeping BYU codes of conduct, and eventually left the university a few months later. BYU president Lee had stated that it was "simply not comfortable for the university" for him to continue teaching there.
- 1997 – A poll of over 400 BYU students found that 42% of students believed that even if a same-sex attracted person kept the honor code they should not be allowed to attend BYU. The poll's stated 5 percent margin of error was criticized as being too low an estimate because of the cluster sampling in classes, however.
- 1997 – Church president Hinckley stated at the World Forum of Silicon Valley that the church would "do all it can to stop the recognition of same-sex marriage in the United States."
- 1997 – Church seventy Bruce C. Hafen presented at the World Congress of Families in the Czech Republic. He stated that one thing that will unbridle societal principles and harm us was legalizing same-sex marriage and that, "if the law endorses everything it tolerates, we will eventually tolerate everything and endorse nothing—except tolerance."
- 1997 – Church president Hinckley gave an interview in which he reaffirmed the stance that God made marriage for one man and one woman and that essentially gay people must live a "celibate life".
- 1997 – General authorities Marlin Jensen, Loren Dunn, and Richard Wirthlin gave recommendations to the church Public Affairs Committee that the church's priesthood structure could be used to gather 70% of the required 700,000 signatures and raise up to $2 million to place an anti-same-sex-marriage ballot on California's June 1998 primary election.
- 1998 – The Church Handbook was updated encouraging members to appeal to government officials to reject same-sex marriage.
- 1998 – The church donated a half million dollars to oppose efforts to legalize same-sex marriage in Alaska.
- 1998 – Church president Hinckley stated again that the church could not support "so-called same-sex marriage".
- 1999 – The Area Presidency of the North America West Area sent a May 11 letter to all area leaders directing members to donate their means and time to pass the Knight Initiative against same-sex marriage in California. A second letter invited church members to donate money, and a third letter (sent a month and a half before the proposition would pass) asked members to redouble their efforts in contacting neighbors and to place provided yard signs.
- 1999 – Prop 22 fundraising quotas were given for some stakes and wards (e.g. one stake had a goal of $37,500 and one ward's goal was $4,000). Some local leaders wrote letter to members soliciting specific amounts. In some instances lawn signs were passed out in the church building after church meetings. An estimated half of pro-Prop 22 money raised came from LDS members. This direct involvement around same-sex marriage laws led certain groups to request the IRS reconsider the LDS Church's tax-exempt status.
- 1999 – Church president Hinckley stated in general conference that, "so-called same-sex marriage ... is not a matter of civil rights; it is a matter of morality. ... There is no justification to redefine what marriage is."
- 1999 – Some members of Affirmation staged a protest in Salt Lake City over the church's lobbying and funding of anti-same-sex-marriage initiatives in California and other states.
- 1999 – Director of BYU's World Family Policy Center Kathryn Balmforth addressed the World Congress of Families in Geneva. In her speech she stated that gay rights activists are part of an anti-family movement that is hijacking human rights by legal force to gain power and "curtail the freedom of most of humanity."

=== 2000s ===
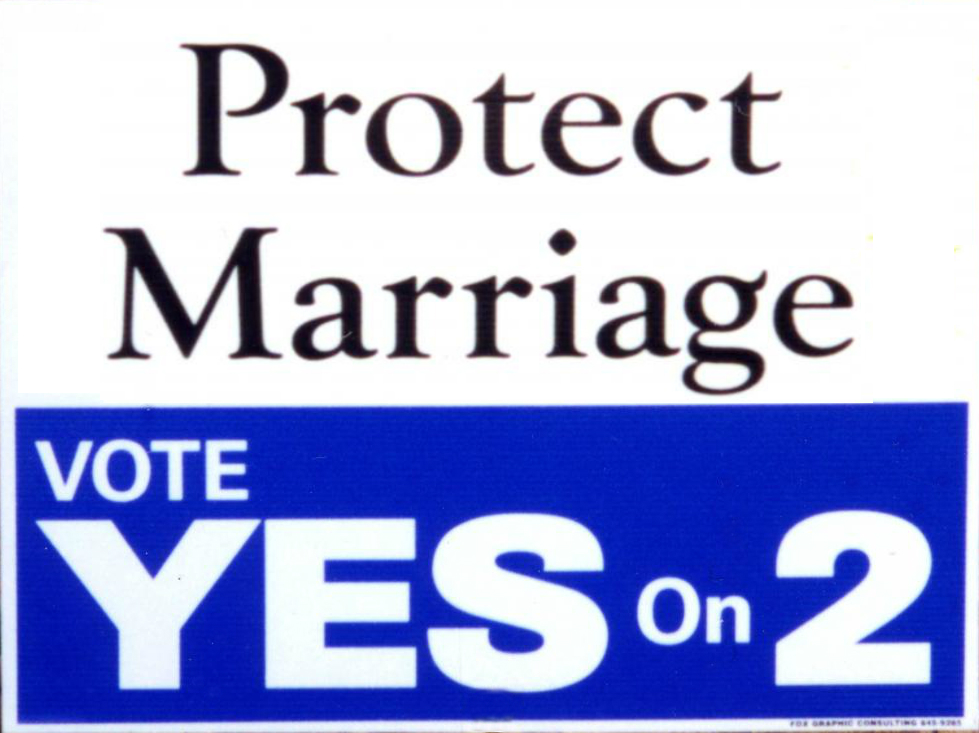
A yard sign distributed to church members

- 2002 – With heavy influence from the LDS Church, Nevada state's Question 2 on amending the state constitution to ban same-sex marriage passed on the 5th after also winning a majority vote in the general elections two-years prior. A Nevada Mormon newspaper Beehive first reported the Coalition for the Protection of Marriage's intent to file an initiative petition in December 1999. The coalition raised over $800,000 by October 2000 from mostly Mormon-owned businesses and LDS individuals. Mormon leaders had strongly encouraged members through letters with church letterhead to do campaign work and post yard signs distributed at church buildings.
- 2004 – In May the church spokesperson stated the church had no position on Utah's proposed anti-same-sex-marriage amendment. Polls showed 68% of Utah Latter-day Saints supported the amendment. Then the First Presidency issued a July 7 statement saying the church favors a constitutional amendment barring the legal status of any marriage outside one between one man and one woman, but did not mention any amendment by name. A few months later on October 19 they expounded this stance to reference a national amendment. The letter states that the church reaches out with understanding and respect for homosexual persons and realizes there may be great loneliness in their lives, but defend their stance.
- 2004 – Church president Gordon Hinckley gave an interview in which he did not support same-sex civil unions and spoke against same-sex marriage. He also stated that gay people have a problem that the church wants to help them solve, though, he said he did not know if they were born with this problem.
- 2005 – The church published an article tying the term gender confusion to homosexuality stating, "If governments were to alter the moral climate by legitimizing same-sex marriages, gender confusion would increase, particularly among children, and this would further blur the line between good and evil."
- 2005 – Shortly after Provo High School students started the first gay-straight alliance in the nearly 90% Mormon Utah County, LDS state Senator Chris Buttars announced a controversial bill to ban gay-straight alliances in Utah public schools.
- 2006 – The church published an extensive April interview with Oaks and Lance B. Wickman to clarify the church's stance on homosexuality. In the interview, Wickman states that giving even same-sex civil unions and domestic partnerships the same government rights given to opposite-sex marriage would not be appropriate.
- 2006 – In April Apostle Russell M. Nelson signed a letter with other religious leaders urging the US government to pass an amendment banning same-sex marriage. On May 25 the First Presidency released another statement supporting the amendment and urging members to contact their senators.
- 2006 – BYU fired adjunct professor Jeffrey Nielsen for writing an opinion piece in support of same-sex marriage.
- 2007 – Seventy Bruce C. Hafen addressed the 4th World Congress of Families in Poland on same-sex marriage. Additionally, BYU Law professor Lynn D. Wardle presented and compared his warnings "tragic consequences" and "dangers of legalizing same-sex marriage" as the warnings of a Hungarian man warning Elie Wiesel's town about the dangers the incoming Nazis posed to the Jewish population there. He also stated that if same-sex marriages were legalized there would be no basis to deny polygamous or incestuous marriages, and a decreased ability to "protect their children from exposure to gay propaganda."
- 2008 – The First Presidency again urged California members to do all they can by giving effort and time to help pass a state amendment banning same-sex marriage in a June 29 letter. A few months later Apostles Ballard and Cook and L. Whitney Clayton gave an October 8 satellite broadcast to all California members titled "The Divine Institution of Marriage Broadcast." In the broadcast they asked members to donate four hours per week and to set aside Saturdays morning to calling people and other efforts supporting the passage of Prop 8. They clarified that tolerance does not mean tolerating transgression, and noted the existence of temple-worthy members attracted to the same sex. Additionally, a video of Apostle Bednar answering youth's questions was shown from the church's official website PreservingMarriage.org. Members were directed to register on the coalition website ProtectMarriage.com.
- November – The Courage Campaign produced a controversial California-aired television ad depicting Mormon missionaries invading a lesbian couple's house and taking their rings and marriage license. The ad elicited a statement from a church spokesperson. The group also created a petition asking the LDS church to stop funding and advocating for Prop 8 which gained over 16,000 signatures.
- 2008 – After the 4 November 2008 close passing of California's Prop 8 banning same-sex marriage in which the LDS church was heavily involved, over two thousand protesters gathered at the Los Angeles LDS temple on November 6. The next day nearly five thousand protesters gathered at the Salt Lake Temple. That evening a candlelight vigil by about 600 mothers of LGBT children was also held at the Salt Lake Temple.
- 2008 – Seventy L. Whitney Clayton stated that the church does not oppose benefits like health insurance and property rights for same-sex civil unions or domestic partnerships.
- 2008 – A chapter of an activist group called for vandalizing LDS meetinghouses in response to their political involvement with Prop 8. Some Bash Back! members spray painted slogans chapels and put glue in the locks. More moderate gay rights groups condemned the actions of the Bash Back! group.
- 2009 – After anti-gay comments he made in a documentary interview became public, LDS bishop and state senator Chris Buttars was removed from a Senate committee for breaking an agreement with Senate leaders not to publicly speak on LGBT topics. He stated gay marriage was a "combination of abominations" that would never come to Utah because of his power and influence, and that he had consulted with other states on using Utah as a model for blocking "protection for the gays".
- 2009 – Then apostle Russell M. Nelson spoke against same-sex marriage at the World Congress of Families held in Amsterdam.
- 2009 – Church PR director Michael Otterson gave a statement at a Salt Lake City Council hearing in support of a proposed city anti-discrimination ordinance which would protect LGBT individuals.

=== 2010s ===
- 2010 – The documentary 8: The Mormon Proposition on LDS involvement with California's 2008 Prop 8 debuts at Utah's Sundance Film Festival.
- 2010 – In a special meeting for some Oakland, California members it was reported that church Seventy and historian Marlin K. Jensen apologized to straight and gay members for their pain from the California Prop 8 campaign and some other church actions around homosexuality.
- 2010 – Boyd K. Packer delivered an October conference address stating that The Family: A Proclamation to the World "qualifies according to the definition as a revelation", and described same-sex marriage as one of "Satan's many substitutes or counterfeits for marriage".
- 2010 – Apostle Packer delivered an October conference address stating that The Family: A Proclamation to the World qualified as a revelation.
- 2011 – A BYU law student published the book Homosexuality: A Straight BYU Student’s Perspective containing arguments in favor of same-sex marriage for which he stated he was threatened with expulsion.
- 2011 – Celibate gay Mormon Drew Call was denied his temple recommend renewal and fired from his LDS church printing office job for refusing to give up his gay friends.
- 2011 – BYU fired a gay broadcasting department faculty member. The employee stated that BYU had become an increasingly hostile work environment and that being gay played into his being fired.
- 2012 – The apostle Oaks stated that members should assume that children of same-sex couples face the same disadvantages of single and unmarried parents.
- 2012 – LDS public affairs leader Bill Evans met with several high-profile LGBT activists in Salt Lake City at the Alta Club including the national Human Rights Campaign director, Dustin Lance Black, Bruce Bastian, the Utah Pride Center director, and the director of Mormons Building Bridges.
- 2013 – Apostle Russell Nelson gave a speech discussing the controversy around same-sex marriage and church teachings. He admonished members to gain understanding of the church's position through prayer, pondering, and listening to conference.
- 2013 – On the 20th same-sex marriages became legally recognized in Utah and within two hours the first same-sex couple was married. They were two former Mormons, medical researcher Michael Ferguson and historian Seth Anderson.
- 2013 – On Christmas Eve Leisha and Amanda LaCrone became the first same-sex couple married in San Pete County, Utah, after being illegally denied the day before. They came from LDS backgrounds, and later reported being harassed by LDS leaders over a disciplinary council in 2016.
- 2013 – Apostle Russell M. Nelson gave a CES devotional discussing the debate around same-sex marriage.
- 2013 – On the 20th of December same-sex marriages became legally recognized in Utah and within two hours the first same-sex couple was married. They were two former Mormons, medical researcher Michael Ferguson and historian Seth Anderson.
- 2014 – A letter on same-sex marriage was sent to all congregational leaders to be shared with members. The letter reiterated church stances and urged members to review the Family Proclamation and called for "kindness and civility" for supporters of same-sex marriage.
- 2014 – An amicus brief was filed by the church with the US Tenth Circuit Court in defense of Utah's recently overturned Amendment 3 banning same-sex marriage in the state. The brief summarized the church's stance on marriage while stating that the church held no "anti-homosexual animus".
- 2014 – A former bishop Kevin Kloosterman, who had received media attention for speaking out for LGBT Mormons while a current bishop, received further coverage for being denied entrance to the temple by his bishop as directed by a church seventy in part because of his support of same-sex marriage.
- 2014 – Another amicus brief on a same-sex marriage case was filed on by the church, this time encouraging the U.S. Supreme Court to hear Utah's Kitchen v. Herbert.
- 2014 – BYU student Curtis Penfold who had been at the university for over two years was kicked out of his apartment, fired from his job, and expulsed from BYU after disagreeing with LDS teachings on LGBT rights.
- 2014 – The apostle Eyring stated at an international colloquium on marriage in the Vatican that "We want our voice to be heard against all of the counterfeit and alternative lifestyles that try to replace the family organization". His statement was quoted in the April 2015 general conference by Apostle Tom Perry.
- 2015 – Church leaders held a "Fairness for All" news conference on January 27 supporting LGBT non-discrimination laws for housing and employment that would also protect religious individuals. Apostle Christofferson called for a balance between religious freedom and LGBT rights. Apostle Oaks followed stating that the church rejects persecution based on gender or sexual orientation and called for legislation protecting religious freedoms and LGBT citizens in housing, employment, and public accommodations. Apostle Holland closed outlining the church's stance on religious freedom.
- 2015 – In early March the church released a public statement and employed its lobbyists to garner support for a proposed nondiscrimination and religious rights bill which would grant housing and employment protection for LGBT persons in Utah. Though similar bills had failed 6 times before, SB 296 was passed on March 11 and another statement of church approval was released. the new law (nicknamed the "Utah Compromise") passed and was praised by many.
- 2015 – Prominent gay member Josh Weed (who received media attention when he came out in 2012) and his wife stated their support for same-sex marriage when quotes from them were used without permission in an amicus brief opposing it ahead of the oral arguments in the Supreme Court Obergefell v. Hodges case.
- 2015 – After a disciplinary council on February 10, John Dehlin was excommunicated from the LDS church in part because of his visible advocacy for same-sex marriage, and his stake president had previously stated that, "if you come out openly in support of [same-sex marriage] that is a problem." An appeal was denied by the church's highest authority.
- 2015 – The apostle Christofferson gave an interview in which he acknowledged the diversity of sociopolitical views among church members and stated that advocating for same-sex marriage on social media or holding political beliefs differing from official church stances would not threaten a member's standing in the church, though, he said the church would never accept same-sex marriage.
- 2015 – The church filed an amicus brief with the Sixth Circuit Court on a pending consolidated same-sex case stating that allowing same-sex marriage would "impede the ability of religious people to participate fully as equal citizens".
- 2015 – Three days after the US Supreme Court ruled in favor of same-sex marriage the First Presidency sent a letter to be read to every US congregation affirming changing US law would not change God's moral law. The letter clarified that leaders should not perform same-sex marriages, and that any church property cannot be used for activities related to same-sex marriages.
- 2015 – D. Todd Christofferson stated that members who openly supported LGBT marriage would not be excommunicated.
- 2015 – Top church leaders sent out another letter to be read in all US congregations reaffirming the church's position on marriage and calling for civility.
- 2015 – A church statement is released saying leaders are "deeply troubled" and re-evaluating its scouting program, as a Boy Scouts of America (BSA) policy change permits openly gay scout leaders. A later announcement said the church will stay in the BSA program, despite the change.
- 2015 – Presidency of the Seventy member Rasband gave a BYU address (later reprinted in the Ensign) in which he addressed concerns about the church's involvement in politics. He shared hypothetical stories of a man fired for being gay and a woman marginalized at work for being Mormon and bemoaned that it is less politically correct to empathize with the religious woman. He invited listeners to discuss LGBT rights and religious freedom and to write comments on his Facebook post.
- 2015 – Apostle Dallin H. Oaks publicly disagreed with refusing gay marriages in violation of the recent supreme court ruling. Days later at the World Congress of Families, apostle Russell Ballard urged tolerance for the opposition.
- 2015 – An update letter to leaders for the Church Handbook was leaked banning a "child of a parent living in a same-gender relationship" from several ordinances. The policy update also added that entering a same-sex marriage as a type of "apostasy", mandating a disciplinary council. A few days later around 1,500 members gathered across from the Church Office Building to submit their resignation letters in response to the policy change with thousands more resigning online in the weeks after
- 2015 – Utah married couple April Hoagland and Beckie Peirce were denied guardian rights over their foster child because of their sexual orientation by BYU graduate, former stake presidency counselor, and Mormon bishop judge Scott Johansen, leading to calls for his impeachment and resulting in his retirement.
- 2016 – Apostle Nelson spoke at BYU-Hawaii on Jan 10 and declared the Nov 5 policy on same sex couples was a revelation from God to Pres Monson
- 2016 – BYU and church policies on LGBT persons got the spotlight as these served as a deterrent in their football team being considered as a Fall addition to the Big 12 Conference, a consideration which was ultimately denied.
- 2016 – Church spokesperson Dale Jones spoke against passing any LGBT-related laws which could affect the balance of religious liberty and gay rights. The statement was in reference to proposed Utah hate crime bill SB107 which would add sexual orientation to the current list of characteristics protected from hate crimes in Utah. The bill failed as it had in past years and its Mormon Republican sponsor criticized his church for its opposition to the bill citing the church's press release as the reason for its failure.
- 2016 – In June the Mexican area authority presidency had a letter read in congregations around the country urging members to oppose the national legalization of same-sex marriage and pointed them to the political organization Conciencia Nacional por la Libertad Religiosa.
- 2016 – After a court ruling, the parent company over one of the largest LDS dating sites, LDSsingles.com, was required to allow same-sex dating as an option.
- 2016 – Young Women's General President Bonnie L. Oscarson gave a conference speech in which she stated that Mormons shouldn't avoid speaking boldly against Satan's lies like same-sex marriage out of fear of offending gay people.
- 2017 – The Boy Scouts of America announced in January that transgender boys can join their troops prompting a wait-and-see response from the church. The church withdrew its support of the program for older teens four months later, though it denied any link to the policy changes around LGBT people.
- 2017 – The church filed an amicus brief with the US Supreme Court over the transgender bathroom case (G. G. v. Gloucester County School Board) in which it opposed the interpretation of sex in Title IX as gender identity.
- 2017 – SB 196 was signed into law which overturned the "no promo homo" laws which had banned "advocacy of homosexuality" while allowing for negative discussions in public schools. Former Mormon Troy Williams of Equality Utah was a driving force behind the change, and he stated that they had worked together with the LDS Church and the majority Mormon legislature to change the laws. One paper stated that the LDS Church was largely behind the reasoning for the laws and anti-gay culture of Utah. Similar laws were still enforced in seven conservative states mostly in the Southern US as of 2017.
- 2017 – An Ensign article by Seventy Larry Lawrence stated that "same-sex marriage is only a counterfeit" and quoted a canonized LDS scripture where Jesus warns that a counterfeit "is not of God, and is darkness".
- 2017 – A Fourth of July parade in the over 75% LDS town of Provo, Utah, reportedly gave permission then denied entry the day before the parade to the new Provo LGBT Mormon resource center Encircle garnering national attention.
- 2017 – An instructor at the church's BYU-Idaho reported being fired after refusing to take down a post on her private Facebook page in support of LGBT rights.
- 2017 – Minutes from a February 2014 Layton, Utah meeting for stake leaders were released without authorization in which the apostle L. Tom Perry stated that supporting same-sex marriage would "incriminate" members seeking to renew their temple recommend. The importance of opposite-sex marriage was stressed with the statement that Jesus and the prophets believed in it and that allowing evil like same-sex marriage to grow would destroy the basic family unit and bring calamities.
- 2017 – The Pacific area presidency sent a letter to be read in September in all Australian congregations which reemphasized the church's position against same-sex marriage and parenting and urged members to "vote their conscience" in the upcoming national referendum on the issue.
- 2017 – The LDS Church signs an amicus brief supporting wedding cake bakers discriminating against same-sex couples in a Colorado court case.
- 2017 – The apostle Oaks lamented the increase in public acceptance of same-sex marriage and acknowledged the conflicts with friends and family that opposing this acceptance could cause. He further stated that despite the conflict church members should choose God and the LDS Church's plan and way.
- 2017 – Apostle Dallin H. Oaks speaks in General Conference about "The Plan and the Proclamation". He states that "Converted Latter-day Saints believe that the family proclamation is the Lord's reemphasis of the gospel truths we need to sustain us through current challenges to the family like same-sex marriage and cohabitation without marriage.
- 2017 – In response to a question about LGBT young single adults in the church, apostle Ballard tells BYU students in a campus-wide event that church leaders believe "core rights of citizenship should be protected for all people — for LGBT people, for people of all faiths," and that "reasonable compromises" should be found "in other areas when rights conflict."
- 2018 – BYU Student Life hosted the first church-university-hosted LGBT campus event. It featured a panel of four students answering student-submitted questions.
- 2018 – After a controversy over BYU's policies around LGBT people, a conference for the US Society for Political Methodology was moved off of campus citing a "long-strained relations between the LGBTQ community and BYU" and concerns over the university's ban on homosexual behavior which the Society repudiated along with "the intolerance it represents."
- 2018 – The LDS Church released a statement in favor of the US Supreme Court ruling on the Masterpiece Cakeshop v. Colorado Civil Rights Commission case over a business owner who refused to serve a gay couple.

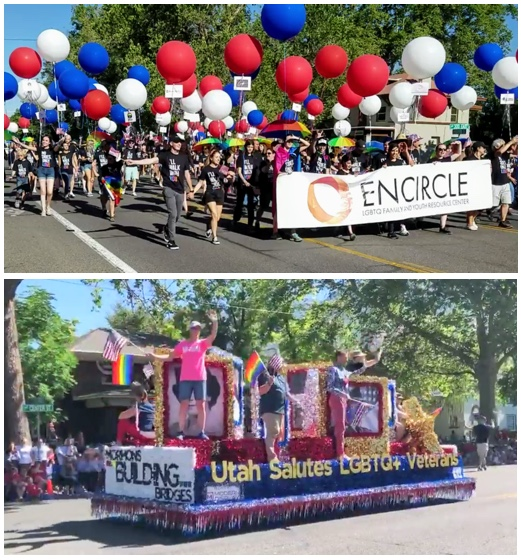
After much controversy LGBTQ marchers including some from the LGBT-Mormon organizations Encircle and Mormons Building Bridges were allowed to openly march in Provo's 4th of July parade for the first time.

- 2018 – Hours after agreeing to a non-discrimination clause in order to receive local tax funds the Provo Freedom Festival board denied LGBTQ groups a spot in the parade for the second year in a row sparking public outcry and criticism from Provo's mayor and Utah County Commissioner. One of these groups included a float of local Mormon LGBTQ veterans representing Mormons Building Bridges. After negotiations, the festival leaders decided to allow the groups to march. However, the day before the parade one LGBT group was almost forced out of the grand parade, and the groups were told they could not have rainbow flags.
- 2018 – Church leaders' continued denial of BYU LGBT students' years of requests to form a club on campus received national coverage.
- 2018 – The documentary Church and State—which highlighted the events surrounding the battle for same-sex marriage in Utah—debuted at the Broadway Theatre in Utah.
- 2019 – The November 2015 policy was changed to say same-gender marriage by a church member will no longer be considered "apostasy" for purposes of church discipline, although it would still be considered "a serious transgression".
- 2019 – Church president Nelson acknowledged that many countries, including the United States, had legalized same-sex marriage, but stated that God has not changed His definition of marriage.
- 2019 – The apostle Oaks stated the teachings of the Family Proclamation would not change, and that its reference to gender meant "biological sex at birth" and that marriage can only be between a man and a woman. A few days later he stated, "our knowledge of God's revealed plan of salvation requires us to oppose current social and legal pressures to retreat from traditional marriage and to make changes that confuse or alter gender or homogenize the differences between men and women." and that leaders of the Church must always teach the unique importance of marriage between a man and a woman.

=== 2020s ===
- 2021 – In an address to faculty and staff at BYU, Apostle Holland called for "a little more musket fire from this temple of learning" in "defending marriage as the union of a man and a woman."
- 2021 – Businessman Jeff Green publicly announced he was leaving the LDS Church and donating $600,000 to the LGBT rights organization Equality Utah. Writing to the president of the Church, Green said, "I believe the Mormon church has hindered global progress in women's rights, civil rights and racial equality, and LGBTQ+ rights."
- 2021 – The U.S. Department of Education began a civil rights investigation of BYU to determine if the university's discipline of LGBTQ students violated the scope of the university's Title IX exemptions.
- 2022 – The U.S. Department of Education dismisses the civil rights investigation of BYU regarding the university's discipline of LGBTQ students, determining that the university was acting within its rights under its approved Title IX exemptions and that the Department of Education's Office of Civil Rights lacked jurisdiction to investigate further.
- 2022 – The church released a statement in support of the Respect for Marriage Act, a bill which would require the states and the federal government to recognize legally performed same-sex marriages.
- 2022 – The church joined others in filing an amici curiae brief regarding the 303 Creative LLC v. Elenis case, supporting 303 Creative's argument that creating a website for a same-sex wedding would violate religious freedom protections for creative professionals.
- 2026 — LGBTQ+ musician and former member David Archuleta publishes his memoir Devout, in which he writes that the apostle M. Russell Ballard allegedly told him that the Quorum of the Twelve has prayed about LGBTQ+ issues but have not received an answer from God.
