= ProtectMarriage.com =

- Founded: 2002; 24 years ago
- Dissolved: 2014; 12 years ago
- Tax ID no.: 26-4753183 (EIN)
- Registration no.: C3196520
- Purpose: Political advocacy
- Location: Sacramento, California
- Key people: Ron Prentice, Executive Director
- Revenue: $416,921 (2009)
- Website: ProtectMarriage.com (Archived link to now defunct website)
- Formerly called: California Renewal

ProtectMarriage.com was a collection of conservative and religious American political activist groups aligned in opposition to same-sex marriage. The coalition's stated goal was to "defend and restore the definition of marriage as between a man and a woman". Beginning in 2001 as Proposition 22 Legal Defense and Education Fund holding the domain name protectmarriage.com, the organization reformed in 2005 as a coalition to sponsor California Proposition 8, called the California Marriage Protection Act, and was successful in placing it on the ballot in 2008. Proposition 8 amended the California Constitution, putting a halt to same-sex marriages in California for nearly two years until the proposition was overturned as unconstitutional. While it was in effect, ProtectMarriage.com defended the amendment in a series of legal challenges. Ron Prentice was the executive director.

== History ==
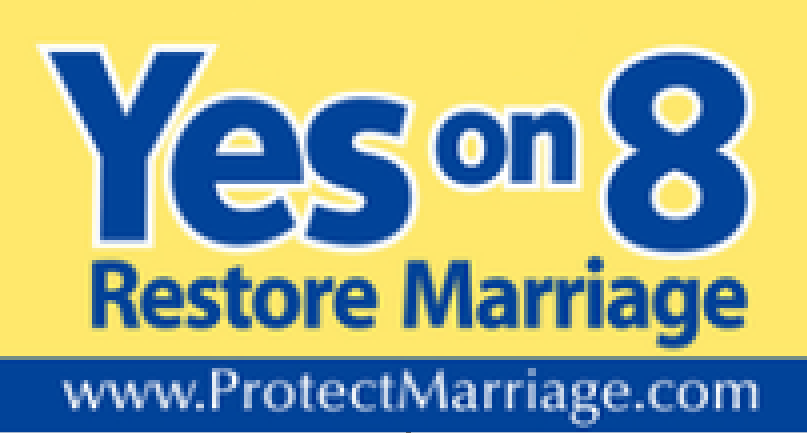
The coalition widely distributed these yard signs during their pro-Prop 8 California campaign in 2008.

In 2001, an organization was formed to defend the previous year's California Proposition 22 against legal challenges, to maintain Prop 22's definition of marriage in California as being between a man and a woman. The group, Proposition 22 Legal Defense and Education Fund, formed as a 501(c)(3) nonprofit, and established a website at protectmarriage.com in September 2002. With California State Senator William J. "Pete" Knight as chairman of the board, the group reported "just over $266,000 of revenue" in its first year. Andrew Pugno held the role of chief counsel—he had been associated with Knight's marriage definition legislation since 1995. Pugno helped Knight form the nonprofit.

Knight died in May 2004. In March 2005, a San Francisco Superior Court judge ruled Prop 22 unconstitutional, and in April, AB 205 was passed by the California legislature; a law which extended many marriage benefits to domestic partners of any sex. These challenges to the one-man-one-woman definition of marriage spurred a change in strategy: rather than defend Prop 22, the advocates associated with the Proposition 22 Legal Defense and Education Fund would re-organize under a new name to pass new legislation. Ron Prentice, executive director of the California Family Council, teamed with former Prop 22 defenders, including Pugno, to establish a coalition of like-minded groups such as Alliance Defending Freedom. The name ProtectMarriage.com was first presented online mid-2005.

== Organization ==
Ron Prentice, the executive director of ProtectMarriage.com, is a licensed marriage and family therapist. In addition to his duties at the organization, he was Chief Executive Officer of the California Family Council until December 2013.

Andrew Pugno was lead counsel at ProtectMarriage.com. He coauthored Proposition 8, and then provided its legal defense. Pugno began his efforts against same-sex marriage in 1995 with then-assemblyman Pete Knight. He was chief counsel in the defense of Proposition 22.

In July 2008, ProtectMarriage.com hired Jennifer Kerns as communications director. Kerns, a public relations consultant, had been the communications director for Steve Poizner's successful 2006 bid for the position of California Insurance Commissioner. She also was assistant to California Secretary of State Bruce McPherson, analyzing election practices and results.

ProtectMarriage.com comprised three programs: Proposition 8 Legal Defense Fund, the ProtectMarriage.com Educational Foundation and ProtectMarriage.com Action Fund.

== Relations with other organizations ==
Members of the coalition include: the Family Research Council, Focus on the Family, and the California Family Alliance.

Catholics for ProtectMarriage.com was formed to support the Proposition 8 campaign. The organization was a collaboration between the Knights of Columbus, the California Catholic Conference and Catholics for the Common Good.

L. Whitney Clayton is the Church of Jesus Christ of Latter-day Saints (LDS Church) liaison with the coalition. The LDS hurch distributed hundreds of thousands of the Protect Marriage Coalition lawn signs during their involvement with the pro-Prop 8 campaign. Church members were directed by top leaders to register and donate on ProtectMarriage.com.

== Proposition 8 ==
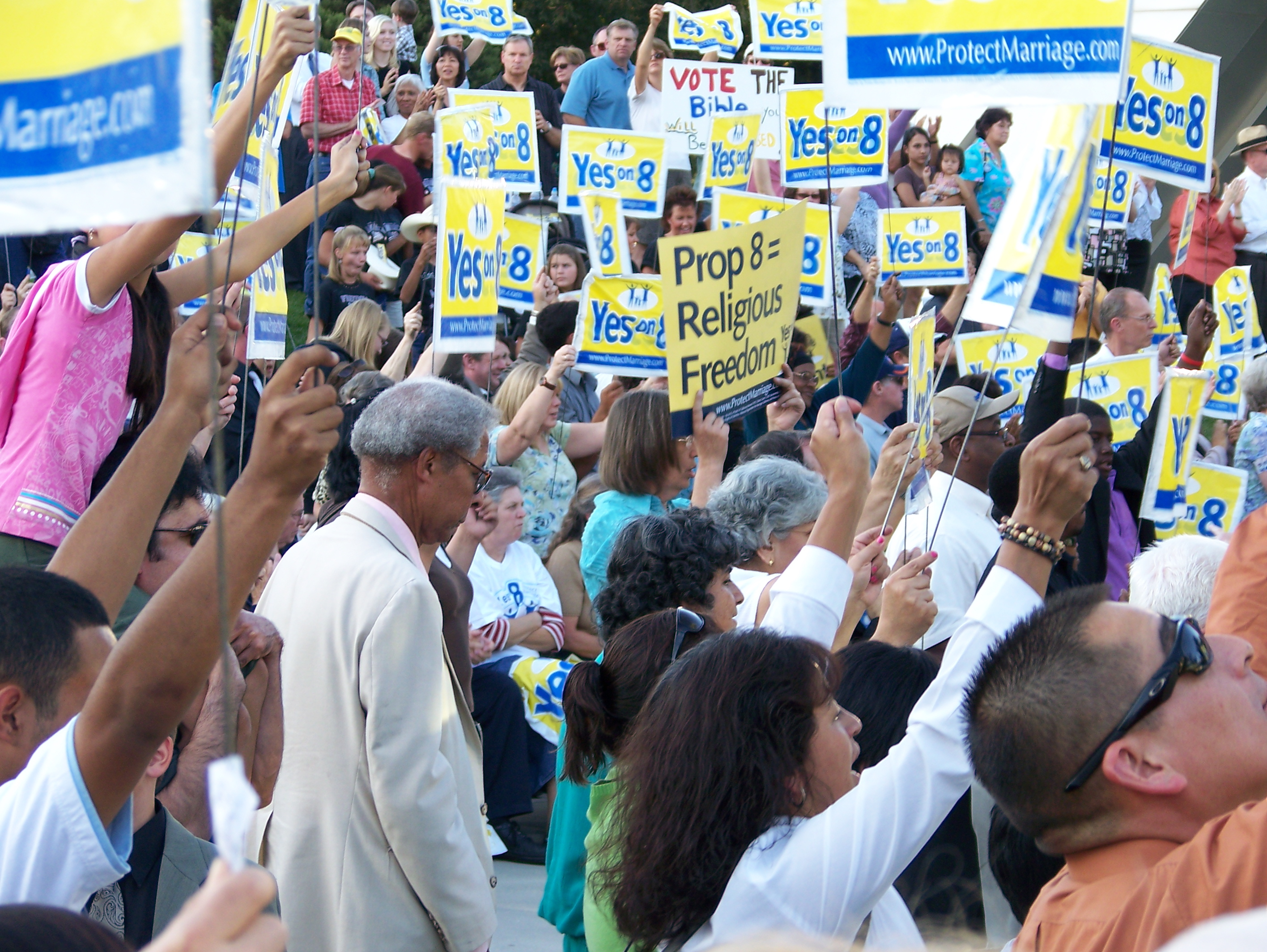
Proposition 8 rally in Fresno

In April, 2008, ProtectMarriage.com submitted a petition containing 1,120,801 signatures—426,447 more than was necessary to put the measure on the ballot. It appeared on the ballot as the Eliminates Rights of Same-Sex Couples to Marry Initiative Constitutional Amendment but was called the California Marriage Protection Act by proponents. The proponents of the measure spent approximately $40 million to promote the proposition, which passed, defining marriage in California as being between one man and one woman.

=== Strauss v. Horton ===
Opponents of Prop 8 filed a legal challenge in the California Supreme Court. The Proposition 8 legal defense team featured Ken Starr. The court upheld the constitutionality of the amendment.

=== Perry v. Schwarzenegger ===
A lawsuit resulted from Courage Campaign altering the top image. The bottom image, which shows two female adult figures, was allowed as a parody.

ProtectMarriage.com took on the role of main defense in Perry v. Schwarzenegger, the case challenging Proposition 8 in federal court. Under the leadership of California State Senator Dennis Hollingsworth, ProtectMarriage.com hired attorney Charles Cooper of Cooper & Kirk to form the defense. Pugno said he considered a number of legal firms but settled upon Cooper & Kirk because he believed them on par with Theodore Olson, former United States Solicitor General, the attorney for the plaintiffs. In October 2009, Cooper "deflected" an effort by Liberty Counsel to use the court case to prove that homosexuality was an "illness or disorder". Cooper explained to reporters his view that Liberty Counsel wanted to fight battles that "can't be won." Pugno said that ProtectMarriage.com has tried to distance itself from "strident and combative" fringe groups in order to set a "civilized tone" for the defense, in the same manner as the proposition campaign.

The court case would have been the first federal trial to be captured live by video cameras, shown in real time at public courthouses in San Francisco, Pasadena, Seattle, Portland, and Brooklyn, through an experimental new system developed by the Ninth Circuit Appeals Court. The trial would also have been shown on the video-sharing website YouTube. Federal judge Vaughn R. Walker noted that he had received 138,574 comments on the plans to broadcast the trial, and all but 32 were in favor. In January 2010, two days before the trial, ProtectMarriage.com filed emergency papers with the United States Supreme Court to bar telecasting the trial. The court ruled 8–1 to temporarily stay live streaming, then ruled 5–4 to indefinitely block live streaming. Plaintiff Rick Jacobs of Courage Campaign said that "Prop 8 backers are continuing their pattern of keeping the truth about this trial from the American public."

From January 11 to January 28, Courage Campaign mounted a website called Prop 8 Trial Tracker which received more than 464,000 views. The website used a logo very similar to their opponent's logo, and the ProtectMarriage.com legal team sent a cease and desist letter, demanding that Courage Campaign stop using the similar logo. Nathan Sabri, an attorney with Morrison & Foerster, the law firm handling the case pro bono for Courage Campaign, responded by writing that the request had no merit, and that his client had noted the irony of the ProtectMarriage.com position—that the image of two children flanked by a man and a woman was said by ProtectMarriage.com to be "substantially indistinguishable" from the two children flanked by two women. On January 19, ProtectMarriage.com filed a lawsuit asking for a temporary restraining order to stop the use of the similar logo. Federal judge Lawrence K. Karlton ruled in favor of Courage Campaign's argument which cited prior cases of one logo being parodied by another.

United States district court Judge Vaughn R. Walker overturned Proposition 8 on August 4, 2010, in the case Perry v. Schwarzenegger, ruling that it violated both the Due Process and Equal Protection clauses of the United States Constitution. ProtectMarriage.com appealed the ruling. In June 2011, Walker's ruling was upheld by James S. Ware, chief judge of the United States District Court for the Northern District of California. In 2012, the United States Court of Appeals for the Ninth Circuit affirmed that the proposition violated the constitutional rights of gays and lesbians. When the matter was appealed to the Supreme Court of the United States, the court found that ProtectMarriage.com had not had legal standing for a federal appeal case, and ordered the Appeals court ruling voided, leaving Walker's ruling standing. California resumed issuing same-sex marriage certificates the following day, leading ProtectMarriage.com to file an emergency application with the Supreme Court, asking that the marriages be halted because the state had not waited the usual 25 days during which the Supreme Court can be asked to reconsider a case before its disposition is considered final. That request was quickly denied by Supreme Court Justice Anthony Kennedy, who had dissented from the decision that had denied ProtectMarriage.com standing.

== See also ==
- National Organization for Marriage
- LGBTQ rights and the LDS Church
