= Cedar City Utah Temple =

LDS Church temple in Cedar City, Utah, US

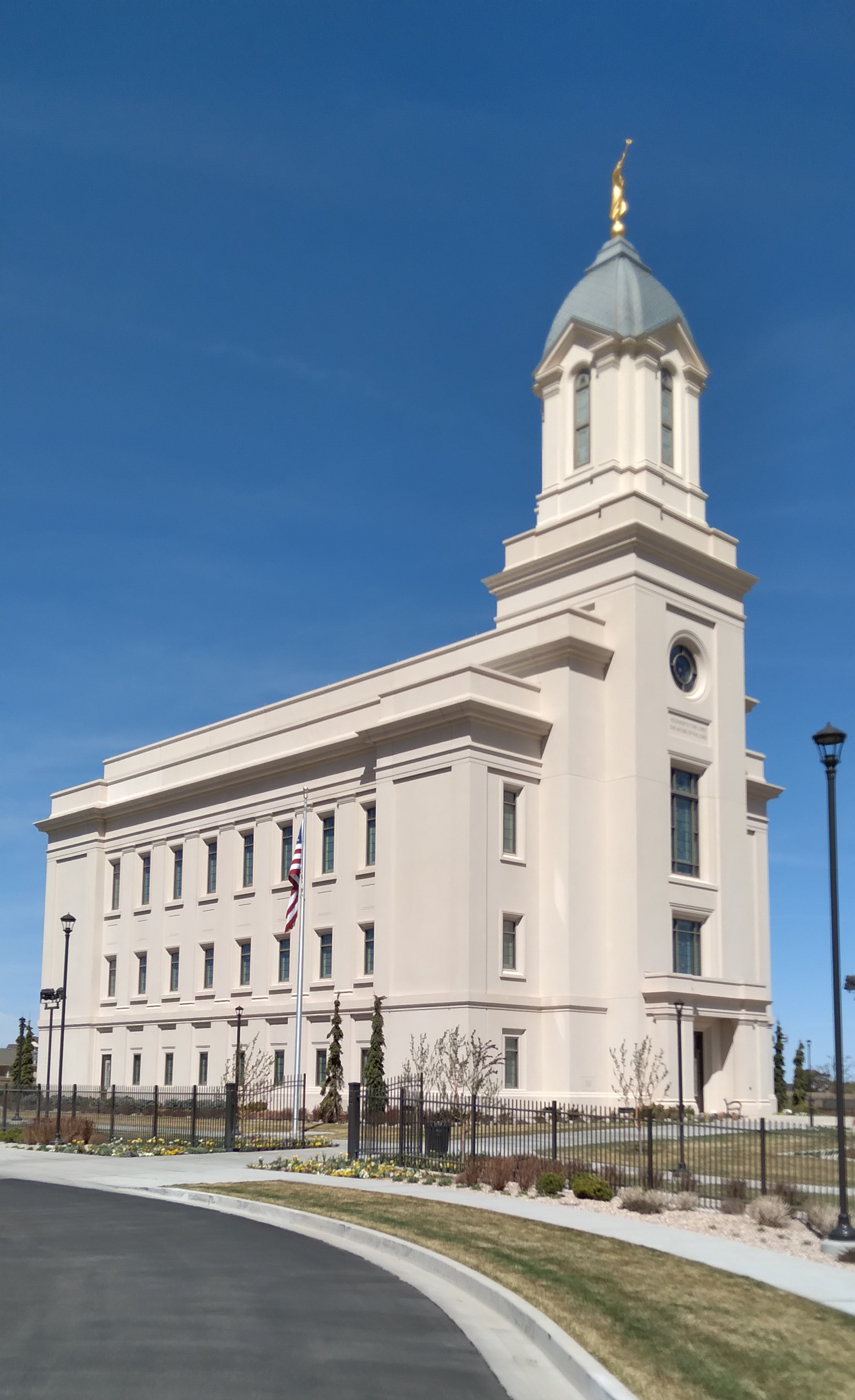
- Front view Cedar City, Utah temple
- Interactive map of Cedar City Utah Temple
- Number: 159
- Dedication: December 10, 2017, by Henry B. Eyring
- Site: 9.5 acres (3.8 ha)
- Floor area: 42,657 ft^{2} (3,963.0 m^{2})
- Height: 160.5 ft (48.9 m)
- Official website • News & images

Church chronology
← Meridian Idaho Temple	Cedar City Utah Temple	→ Concepción Chile Temple

Additional information
- Announced: April 6, 2013, by Thomas S. Monson
- Groundbreaking: August 8, 2015, by L. Whitney Clayton
- Open house: October 27 – November 18, 2017
- Current president: John Wallace Yardley
- Designed by: Architectural Nexus, Salt Lake City, Utah
- Location: Cedar City, Utah, United States
- Coordinates: 37°40′18″N 113°05′47″W
- Exterior finish: Precast concrete panels with sections of gypsum fiber reinforced concrete
- Baptistries: 1
- Ordinance rooms: 2
- Sealing rooms: 3

The Cedar City Temple is a temple of the Church of Jesus Christ of Latter-day Saints in Cedar City, Utah, United States. The intent to construct the temple was announced by church president Thomas S. Monson on April 6, 2013, during general conference. The temple was announced concurrently with the Rio de Janeiro Brazil Temple. At the time, this brought the total number of temples worldwide to 170. It is the 17th temple built in Utah.

The temple was designed by Architectural Nexus, a firm located in Salt Lake City. A groundbreaking ceremony, to signify the beginning of construction, was held on August 8, 2015, conducted by L. Whitney Clayton of the Presidency of the Seventy.

== History ==
The temple was announced by Thomas S. Monson on April 6, 2013. On May 4, 2015, the church announced that the temple would be constructed on a property located at 300 South Cove Drive in Cedar City. On August 8, 2015, L. Whitney Clayton presided at a groundbreaking to signify the beginning of construction. A public open house was held from October 27 through November 18, 2017, excluding Sundays. The temple was dedicated on December 10, 2017 by Henry B. Eyring.

In 2020, like all the church's others, the Cedar City Utah Temple was closed for a time in response to the COVID-19 pandemic.

== Design and architecture ==
The building’s architectural style was intended to reflect pioneer-era temples. Designed by Architectural Nexus, its architecture reflects both the cultural heritage of the southern Utah region and its spiritual significance to the church.

The temple is on a 9.5-acre plot, and its landscaping features “a mix of native plants and traditional ornamentals appropriate for the climate.” These elements are designed to enhance the sacred atmosphere of the site.

The structure is three stories tall and constructed with beige precast concrete panels. It has an attached end tower with a statue of the angel Moroni. The exterior has art glass windows depicting local flora.

The interior has motifs of local wildflowers and juniper berries, with colors inspired by the natural landscapes of southern Utah. The temple also houses two stained-glass windows from a Presbyterian church in New York, as well as eight artworks by local artists.

The temple includes three sealing rooms and one baptistry.

The design has elements representing the region’s pioneer heritage, providing spiritual meaning to the temple's appearance and function.

== Temple presidents ==
The church's temples are directed by a temple president and matron, each serving for a term of three years. The president and matron oversee the administration of temple operations and provide guidance and training for both temple patrons and staff.

Serving from 2017 to 2020, Daniel M. Jones was the first president, with JoAnn D. Jones serving as matron. As of 2024, John W. Yardley is the president, with Pamela R. Yardley serving as matron.

== Admittance ==
Following the completion of the temple, a public open house was held from October 27 to November 18, 2017 (excluding Sundays). During the open house, more than 187,000 people visited the temple. The temple was dedicated by Henry B. Eyring on December 10, 2017.

Like all the church's temples, it is not used for Sunday worship services. To members of the church, temples are regarded as sacred houses of the Lord. Once dedicated, only church members with a current temple recommend can enter for worship.

== See also ==
Temples in Utah
Wasatch Front Temples
Temples along the Wasatch Front
- = Operating
- = Under construction
- = Announced
- = Temporarily Closed

- The Church of Jesus Christ of Latter-day Saints in Utah
- Comparison of temples of The Church of Jesus Christ of Latter-day Saints
- List of temples of The Church of Jesus Christ of Latter-day Saints
- List of temples of The Church of Jesus Christ of Latter-day Saints by geographic region
- Temple architecture (Latter-day Saints)
