= L. Whitney Clayton =

American religious leader

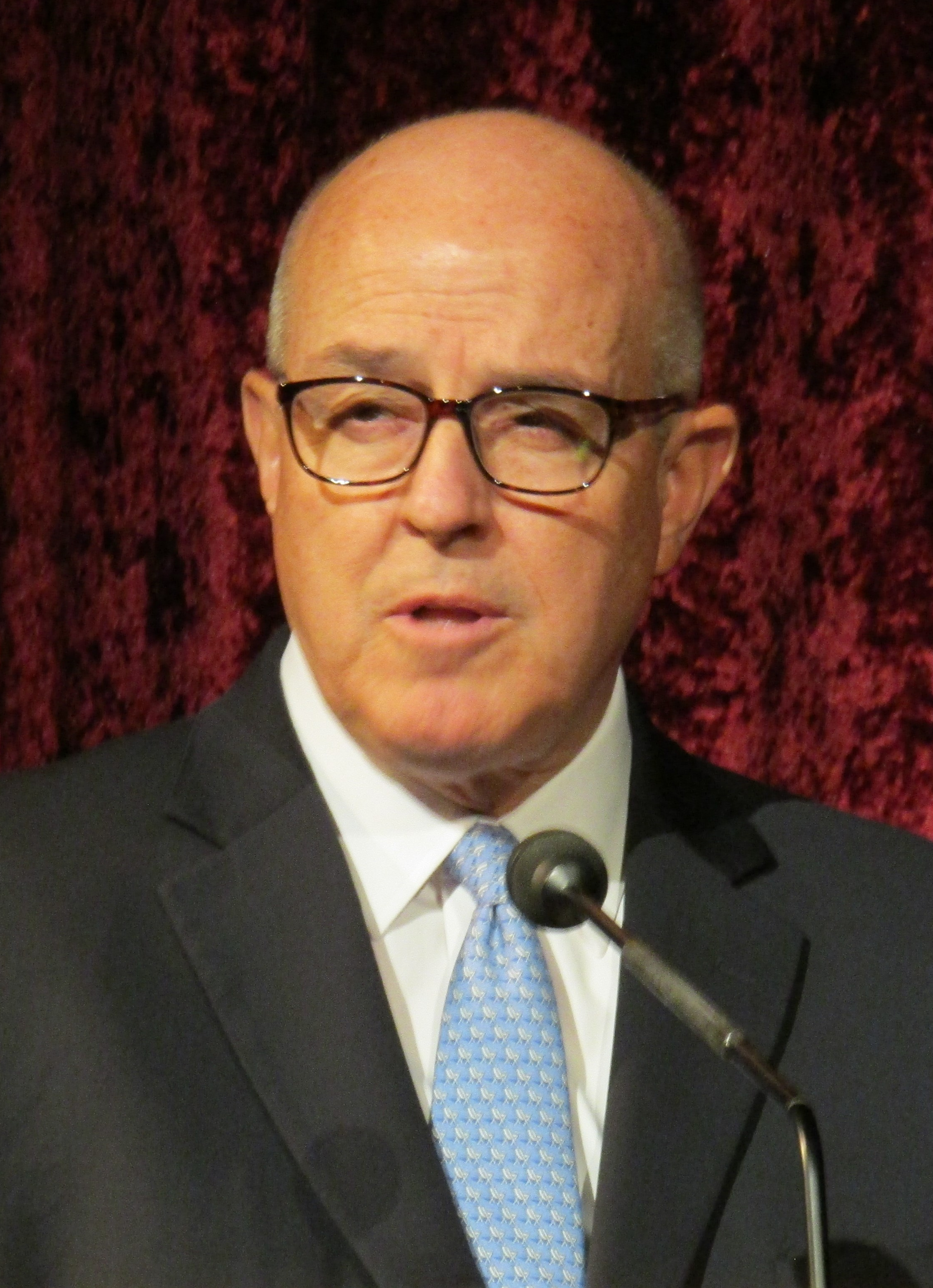

Emeritus General Authority
- October 3, 2020

First Quorum of the Seventy
- March 31, 2001 – October 3, 2020
- Called by: Gordon B. Hinckley

Presidency of the Seventy
- April 5, 2008 – August 1, 2020
- Called by: Thomas S. Monson

Personal details
- Born: Lyndon Whitney Clayton III; February 24, 1950 (age 75); Salt Lake City, Utah, United States
- Spouse(s): Kathy Ann Kipp
- Children: 7

Lyndon Whitney Clayton III (born February 24, 1950) has been a general authority of the Church of Jesus Christ of Latter-day Saints (LDS Church) since 2001. He became a member of the church's Presidency of the Seventy in 2008 and was its senior president from 2015 until 2020.

== Biography ==
Clayton was born in Salt Lake City, Utah, and attended the University of Utah. He served as a full-time missionary of the LDS Church in Peru. He graduated with a bachelor's degree in finance and earned a law degree at the University of the Pacific. Clayton was a partner in the Newport Beach, California–based law firm of Call, Clayton and Jensen. He was with this law firm from 1981 to 2001.

Clayton married Kathy Ann Kipp in the Salt Lake Temple on August 3, 1973, and they are the parents of seven children.

== LDS Church service ==
Clayton served previously in the LDS Church as a bishop, stake high councilor, counselor in a mission presidency, regional representative, and area seventy. At the time of his call as an area seventy, the Claytons lived in Irvine, California.

Clayton was called as a general authority and member of the First Quorum of the Seventy in 2001. Previous assignments as a general authority have included serving as both a counselor and as president of the church's South America South Area and as an Assistant Executive Director of the Family and Church History Department. When Clayton was called to the Presidency of the Seventy on April 5, 2008, he was assigned supervisory responsibility for the church's North America West and North America Northwest areas. From 2012 to 2015, he supervised the church's work in the three geographical areas within Utah. In August 2015, Clayton presided at the groundbreaking of the church's Cedar City Utah Temple.

As the LDS Church received criticism for alleged sexual abuse of boys in the church's scouting units, dating back decades but made public by allegations in 2015, Clayton commented on the church's ongoing efforts to prevent child abuse within its programs.

From October 2015 to August 2020, Clayton was the senior, or presiding, member of the Presidency of the Seventy. He filled the position previously held by Ronald A. Rasband, who was called to serve in the Quorum of the Twelve Apostles. He was designated as an emeritus general authority in October 2020.

In April 2016, Clayton's brother, Weatherford T. Clayton, was sustained as a general authority.

Since August 2021, Clayton has been first counselor to Mike Leavitt in the presidency of the Tabernacle Choir at Temple Square.

Clayton has been a speaker at a number of religious events or forums, frequently speaking on religious freedom.
