= LGBTQ Mormon people and organizations =

LGBTQ people in the Latter Day Saint community

LGBTQ Mormon people are LGBTQ individuals (Note: LGBTQ is an initialism for lesbian, gay, bisexual, transgender and queer or questioning which functions as an umbrella term broadly referring to all sexualities, romantic orientations, sex characteristics, and gender identities that are not heterosexual, heteroromantic, cisgender, or endosex.) with historical, cultural, or religious ties to the Latter Day Saint movement. There are many organizations centered on LGBTQ people within Mormon and Mormon-adjacent communities affiliated with several Latter Day Saint denominations. LGBTQ Latter-day Saints include both practicing members and former members of the largest denomination the Church of Jesus Christ of Latter-day Saints.

Public discussion of LGBTQ people by senior leaders of the LDS Church increased in the mid-to-late 20th century, and since the 1970s, LGBTQ individuals with Mormon connections have received growing attention in news media, scholarship, and popular culture. A range of independent support, advocacy, and community organizations has emerged in response, often operating separately from official denominational sponsorship.

== LGBTQ Mormon population estimates ==
Although there are no official numbers for how many members of the LDS Church identify as gay or lesbian, there have been several estimates. Large surveys of over 7,000 students at the church's largest school Brigham Young University (BYU) in 2020 and 2017 found that over 13% had marked their sexual orientation as something other than "strictly heterosexual", while the other survey showed that .2% had reported their gender identity as transgender or something other than cisgender male or female. Over 98% of BYU students are church members. In 2003, BYU's newspaper cited two LDS therapists who stated that the supermajority-Mormon BYU student body is "somewhere around 4 to 5 percent" homosexual. Family Services estimated that there are, on average, four or five members per church ward attracted to the same sex. An external study, conducted in 1972, found that between 10 and 13 percent of college-aged Mormon men reported past same-sex sexual behavior, which was similar to the percentage of non-Mormon men who similarly reported. The study did not tabulate the number of homosexual individuals who had never had a same-sex sexual experience. In 1979 BYU's newspaper published a series of articles on homosexuality in which Maxine Murdock of the BYU Counseling Center and Ford McBride, a former psychology student who conducted BYU electroshock aversion experiments on gay BYU students, estimated that 4% of BYU students (or around 1,200 students at the time) were attracted to the same sex.

Gary Watts, former president of Family Fellowship, estimates that only 10 percent of homosexual Mormons remain in the church. Others dispute that estimate, saying numbers in support groups for active Latter-day Saints and for self-identified gay Mormons are comparable. A number of LDS people who experience attractions to their same sex shared experiences in the 1997 book A Place in the Kingdom: Spiritual Insights from Latter-day Saints about Same-Sex Attraction. Others have shared their stories through the now defunct Ensign and Evergreen.

== Prominent LGBTQ Mormon people ==
=== Practicing Mormons ===
- Tom Christofferson is the brother of Apostle D. Todd Christofferson and has returned to activity in the church after leaving decades ago. He serves in Affirmation leadership.
- Ben Schilaty is a BYU adjunct instructor and Honor Code Administrator. He publicly came out as gay in 2015 and published a book on his experiences with homosexuality titled A Walk in My Shoes: Questions I'm Often Asked As a Gay Latter-Day Saint, published bv Deseret Book in 2021. He also co-hosts the popular Questions from the Closet podcast which discusses LGBTQ+ topics within the context of the LDS faith.
- Ty Mansfield served as a missionary in the New Hampshire Manchester Mission, graduated from BYU, and has been an adjunct instructor in Religious Education at BYU since the summer of 2013. He chronicled his coming to terms with his sexuality in a co-authored book with Fred and Marilyn Matis, In Quiet Desperation: Understanding the Challenge of Same-gender Attraction, published by Deseret Book in 2004. Mansfield later married and published another book on homosexuality, also by Deseret Book, in 2011, titled Voices of Hope: Latter-day Saint Perspectives on Same-gender Attraction—An Anthology of Gospel Teachings and Personal Essays.
- H. Stuart Matis, a celibate homosexual, stated that "straight members have absolutely no idea what it is like to grow up gay in this church. It is a life of constant torment, self-hatred and internalized homophobia." Matis committed suicide at an LDS Church meetinghouse in Los Altos, California in 2000. After two of his gay friends also committed suicide, Affirmation members began to hold suicide vigils around the country to raise awareness about suicide prevention and the destructive consequences of what they considered to be homophobic treatment by other church members. Suicide victims are posted on its website. Matis's story is described in the book In Quiet Desperation: Understanding the Challenge of Same-Gender Attraction and was later inspired and created into the play "Missa Solemnis; or, The Play About Henry" written by non-Mormon playwright Roman Feeser. Matis's death was described in the 2010 documentary 8: The Mormon Proposition.
- Mitch Mayne, a celibate homosexual member in San Francisco, served as of 2011 as executive secretary to the bishop in the local Bay Ward. Mayne has promoted family acceptance of LGBTQ youth and hopes to serve as a bridge to the gay community. He has also promoted the idea that all people with homosexual feelings, including those who are involved in homosexual behavior, should be welcomed into the church with no consequences for their sexual choices. He has said that he is not committed to church teachings about homosexuality and could well enter a gay relationship in the future. He believes that church leaders are mistaken in their teachings about homosexuality.
- Rich Wyler was excommunicated from the church due to his homosexual behavior, but has since rejoined the church. He was married and then widowed. He is the founder and executive director of People Can Change and co-creator and leader of Journey into Manhood. He established Higher Path Life Coaching and began coaching professionally in 2005. He leads telephone-based coaching group called "A Wife's Journey: Caring for Yourself and Your Family When Your Husband Struggles With Homosexuality or Addiction."
- Savannah, a Mormon girl, came out as a lesbian to her congregation at the age of 12 in 2017.
- Roswell Grey is a queer LDS activist. Grey is known for working to reconcile religious identity and queer identity, especially for youth of faith, and advocating visibility, support, and acceptance in both digital and physical spaces. They were a notable member of Beloved Arise's youth ambassador team. In 2022, Roswell Grey was chosen for Good Morning America’s Inspiration List among LGBTQ+ youth making change. Grey was also part of GLAAD’s 20 Under 20 class, as one of its honored changemakers.
- Kris Irvin was a transgender Latter-Day Saint activist. They wrote candidly about their experiences with faith, gender identity, and parenting on Twitter, where they had over 6,000 followers and was considered a "community icon." They organized demonstrations for fair treatment of queer members at both LGBTQIA+ and Latter-Day Saint events, including General Conference. They died January 23, 2022, at age 35.

=== Living former Mormons ===
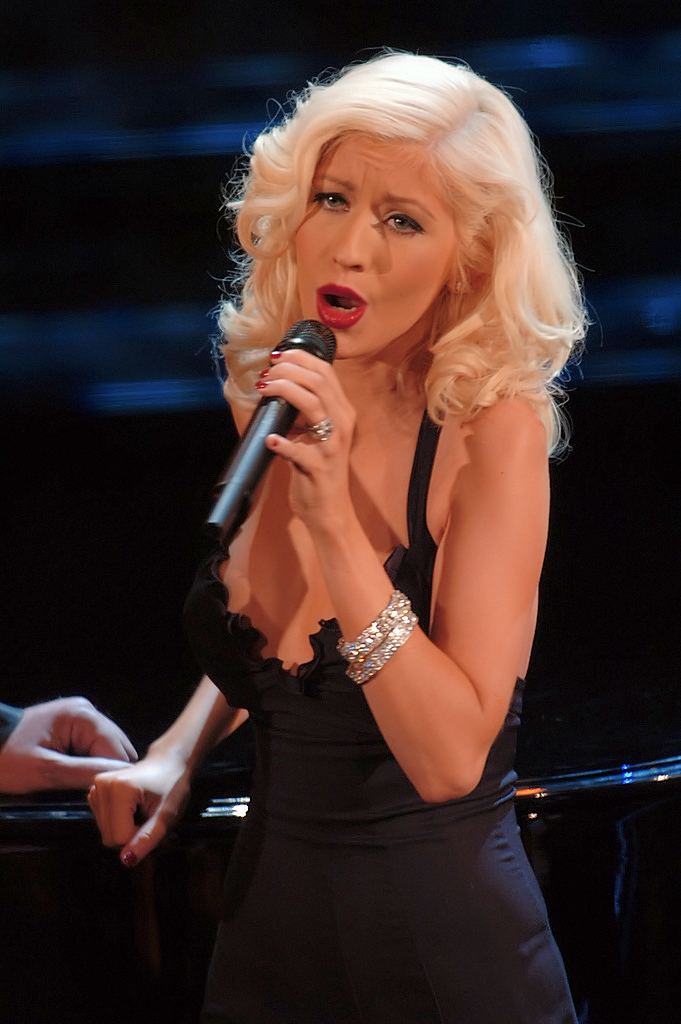
Singer Christina Aguilera

- Christina Aguilera is a singer who was raised in an LDS home by parents who met at BYU and married in the Washington D.C. Temple, though, Aguilera has not self-identified as Mormon. On several occasions Aguilera has mentioned her physical attraction to women as well as men.

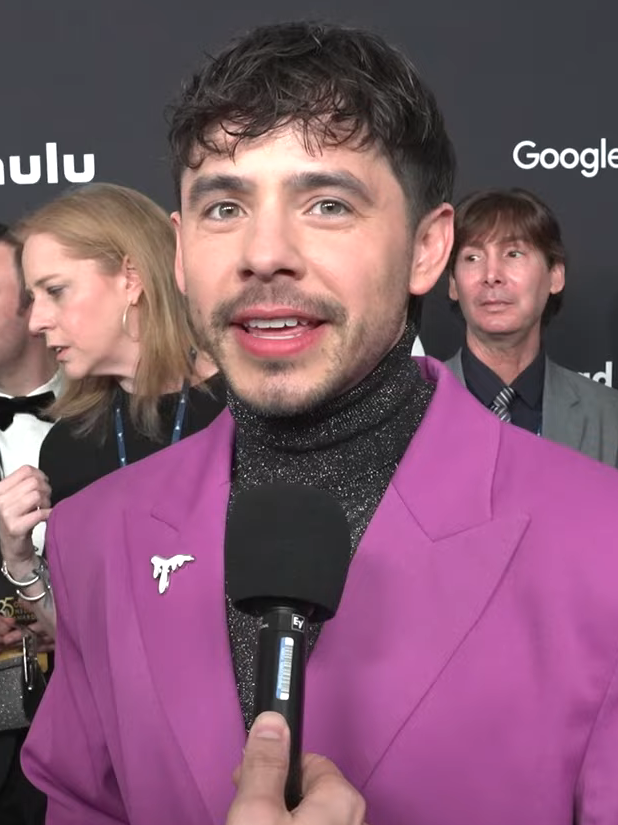
Singer David Archuleta

- David Archuleta came out as gay to his family in 2014, then publicly in June 2021. He and his mother disaffiliated from the LDS Church in 2022.
- Bruce Bastian served as a church missionary to Italy, graduated from BYU, and married in a church temple before coming out. He and a BYU professor developed and co-founded WordPerfect software for word processing. He currently serves on the board of the Human Rights Campaign, America's largest lesbian and gay rights political action committee. In 2008, Bastian donated $1 million to fight California Proposition 8, which defined marriage as between a man and a woman.
- Martha Nibley Beck, daughter of Mormon apologist Hugh Nibley and author of bestseller Leaving the Saints: How I Lost the Mormons and Found My Faith.
- Dustin Lance Black is an American screenwriter, director, film and television producer and LGBTQ rights activist. He who wrote for the HBO Series Big Love on a polygamous Utah family, created the LGBTQ history ABC docudrama miniseries "When We Rise", and narrated the documentary "8: The Mormon Proposition". In 2008, he won an Academy Award for writing the screenplay for Milk, a movie about the 1978 assassination of gay civil rights leader and San Francisco City Supervisor Harvey Milk.
- Patrick Califia is a writer on the topic of sexuality and is a bisexual trans man.
- John Cameron is a former BYU student who participated in electro-shock aversion therapy sessions on campus in 1976 with the goal of changing his sexual orientation. The controversial therapy was conducted by PhD student Max Ford McBride under the direction of Dr. D. Eugene Thorne of the Psychology Department. While hooked to electrodes, the subjects were shown pornographic images of men while simultaneously being shocked. The experience was so traumatic for Cameron that he left Mormonism. In 2006, he finished writing a play about his experience, titled 14, in reference to the number of men who were the subjects of this particular experiment. The play was first staged at the University of Iowa in 2007.

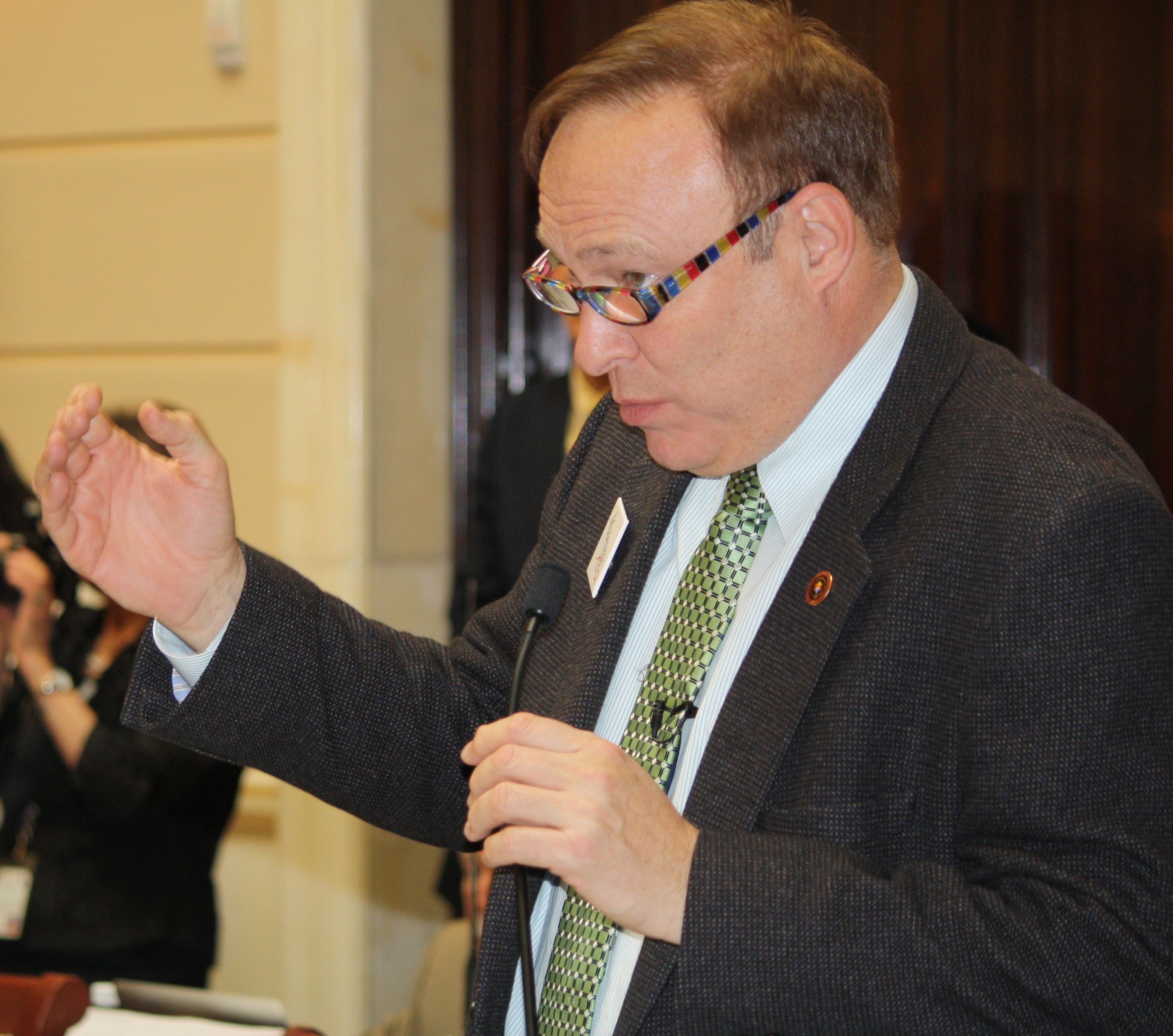
Senator Jim Dabakis sporting rainbow pride glasses in 2013.

- Jim Dabakis is a Utah state senator married to his husband Stephen Justeson and enrolled in BYU in 1971, but left after his mission when he came out at 23.
- Andrew Evans is a National Geographic journalist who wrote about his compulsory year of conversion therapy and "traumatic moments" as a student at BYU.
- Levi Jackman Foster is a queer artist/photographer, social media influencer, and LGBTQ activist raised Mormon in Alaska. Levi left home at age 16 to escape conversion therapy and has since voiced opinions advocating for LGBTQ rights working with organizations such as Trevor Project, GLAAD, FIERCE NYC, SAGE, Marriage Equality USA, No on 8, Human Rights Campaign, Ali Forney Center, Los Angeles LGBTQ Center, San Francisco AIDS Foundation, New York LGBTQ Center and has created multiple social media campaigns raising funds and awareness for at-risk, marginalized, ex-Mormon, and homeless LGBT youth and elderly.
- Michael Glatze is a former gay rights activist and publisher of Young Gay America's YGA Magazine. Glatze renounced his homosexual relationships and was baptized into the LDS Church. He stated that "Jesus, however, is what, ultimately, changed me." Glatze left the church within two years of his conversion and now considers himself a conservative Christian and serves as a pastor of a small church in Wyoming. His story is told in the independent film "I Am Michael" starring James Franco and Zachary Quinto.

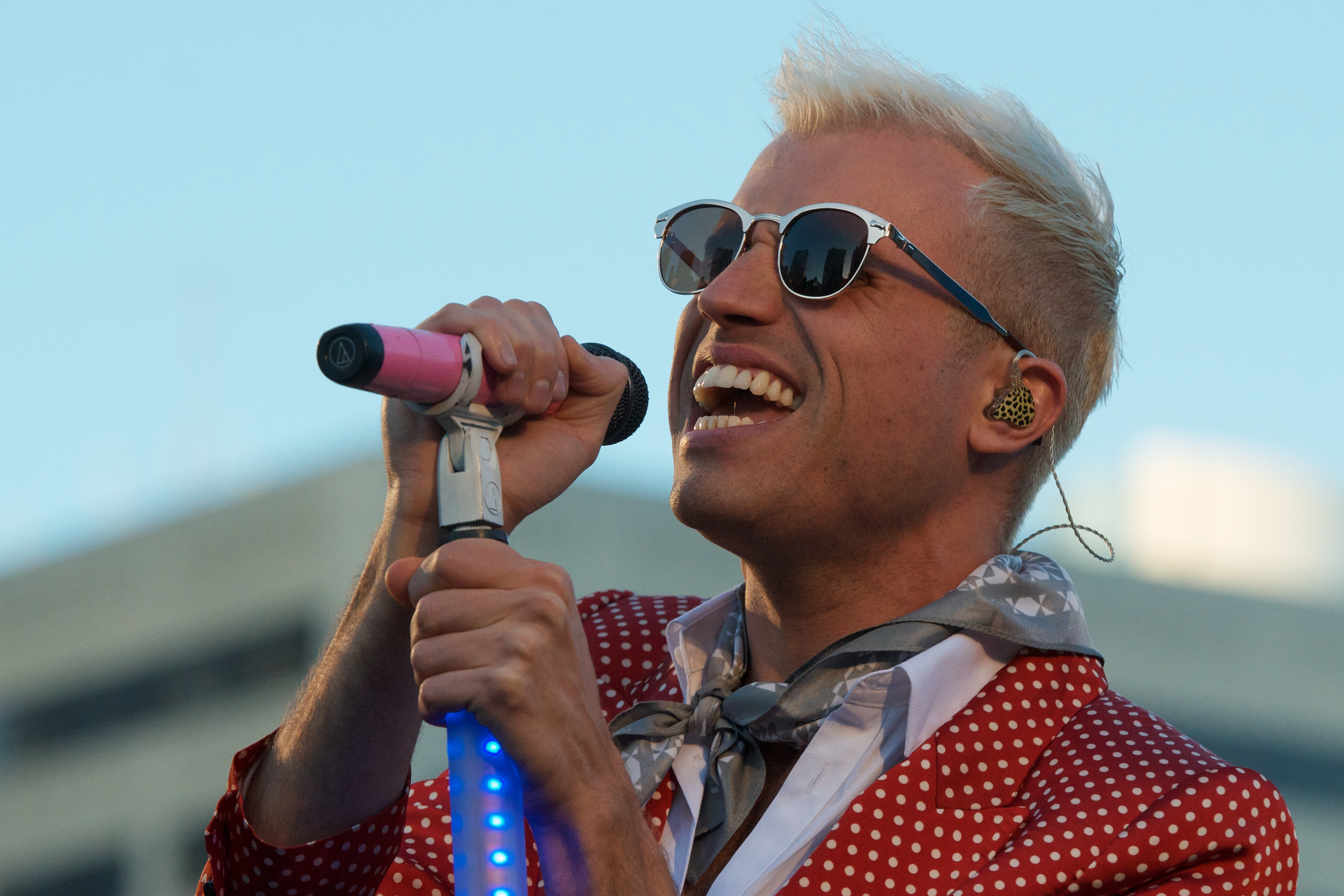
Singer Tyler Glenn

- Tyler Glenn is the lead vocalist of the American rock band Neon Trees and came out as a gay Mormon in Rolling Stones magazine in March 2014, but has since stopped identifying as Mormon since at least April 2016.

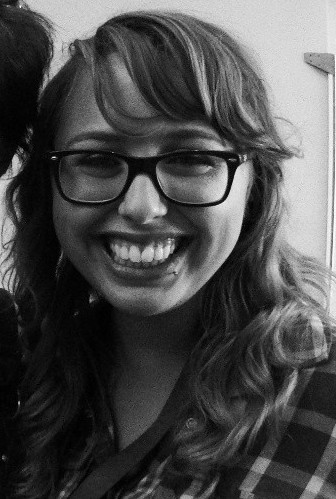
Laci Green, sex educator

- Laci Green is a bisexual sex educator and online video creator for Seeker and MTV. In 2016, Time named her one of the 30 most influential people on the Internet.
- Jimmy Hales gained media attention as a BYU student with his live coming out video.
- Jesse Havea is a drag queen with the stage name "Brita Filter".
- Stephen Holbrook is a Utah state politician and activist. He formed the Salt Lake community radio show featuring lesbian and gay voices while serving in the Utah State House of Representatives after his first election in 1975. The hour-long show called "Gayjavu" eventually became "Concerning Gays and Lesbians," lasting until 2003 as one of the nation's longest continually running homosexual radio programs. He had served an LDS mission in Hong Kong before disaffiliating from the LDS church, though, he did not come out as gay publicly until later.
- Sonia Johnson is a prominent radical feminist and supporter of the Equal Rights Amendment.
- Kate Kendell is a lesbian lawyer from Utah who currently serves as the executive director of the National Center for Lesbian Rights. She graduated from the University of Utah in 1988 and became the first staff attorney for the American Civil Liberties Union of Utah. Kate and her partner, Sandy Holmes, live in San Francisco with their two children, as well as Kendall's daughter from a previous marriage.
- David Matheson admitted to himself that he was attracted to men when he was 22 and married to a woman. Following seven years of therapy, he said he had changed his sexual orientation. He became a licensed professional counselor and has made his clinical focus to be "helping men who want to diminish unwanted homosexuality and feel whole as men." In January 2019, Matheson divorced his wife of 34 years, and has admitted that he is now dating men. He is the clinical director of the Center for Gender Wholeness, co-creator of the Journey into Manhood weekend, and a director of People Can Change. He has written the Evergreen International Workbook for Men, Four Principles of Growth, and has made several media appearances talking about overcoming homosexual attractions.
- Connell O'Donovan is a Utah-raised genealogist, historian, and gay activist who organized the first Utah pride march in 1990.
- David Petruschin is a drag queen with the stage name "Raven" and was raised Mormon.
- Benji Schwimmer, the winner of the 2006 So You Think You Can Dance show.
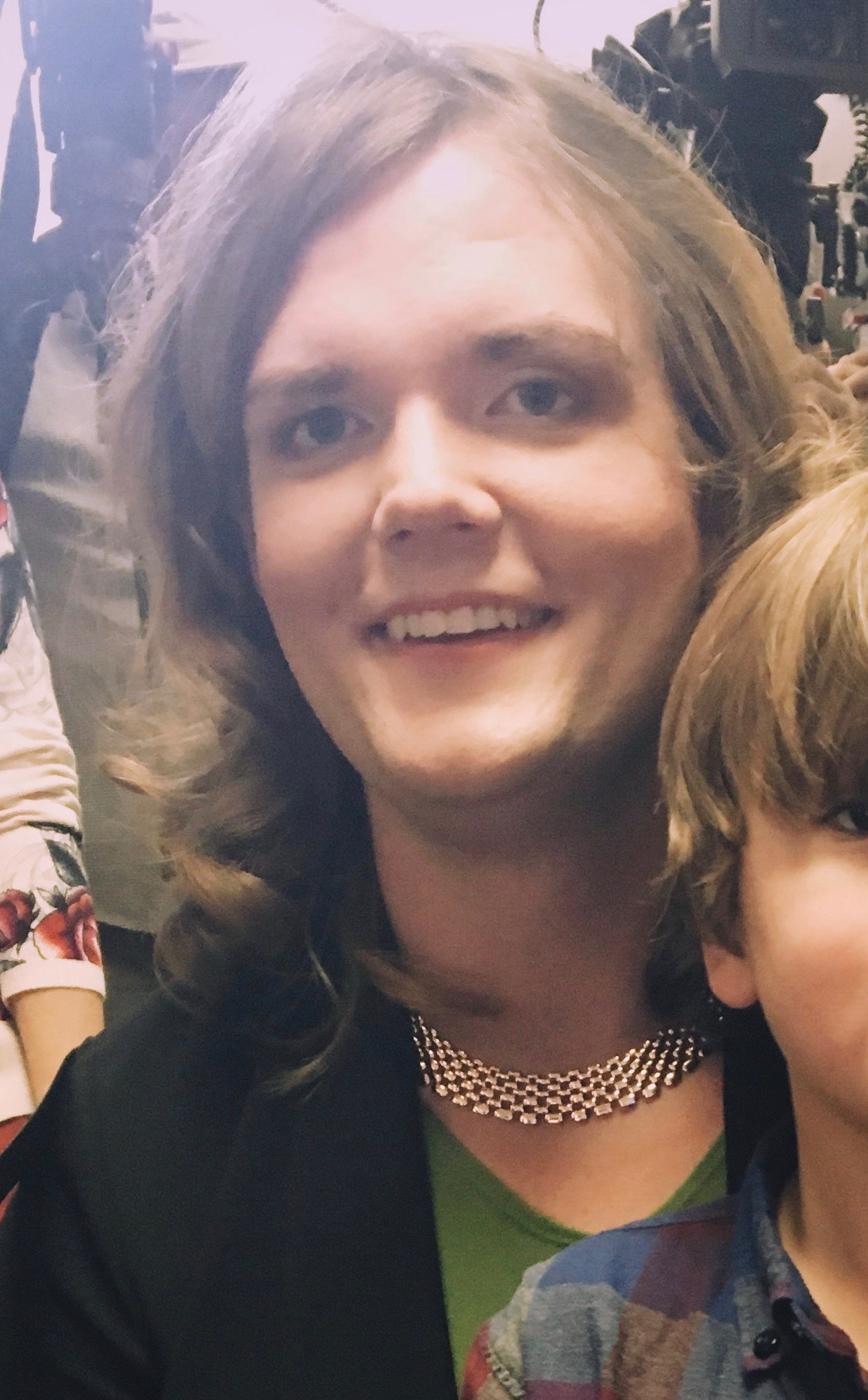
Former Mormon Misty Snow ran as the first transgender person nominated by a major party for the U.S. Senate.
- Misty Snow is an American politician and transgender woman who grew up Mormon in Salt Lake City. She won over 1/4th of Utah votes for state senator, as the first transgender nominee for a major party to the nation's Senate.
- Layla Taylor is a main cast member of The Secret Lives of Mormon Wives. She came out as bisexual on June 29, 2026.
- Brendon Urie is the lead singer of the band Panic! at the Disco. He was raised Mormon and has stated that he has "experimented in other realms of homosexuality and bisexuality" and has discussed his sexual fluidity.
- Justin Utley is a singer songwriter who has spoken out about the conversion therapy he underwent at the advice from church leaders.
- Troy Williams served a mission in Great Britain and now serves as the executive director of the LGBTQ rights organization Equality Utah. He is an activist and has published articles in several works.
- Josh Weed is a licensed therapist from Seattle who is married to a woman. He came out as gay in a 2012 blog post that was widely publicized. He and his wife came out in support of same-sex marriage in 2015 when quotes from them were used without permission in an amicus brief opposing it ahead of the oral arguments in the Supreme Court Obergefell v. Hodges case. In 2018, they announced their divorce in another blog post.

=== Deceased former Mormons ===
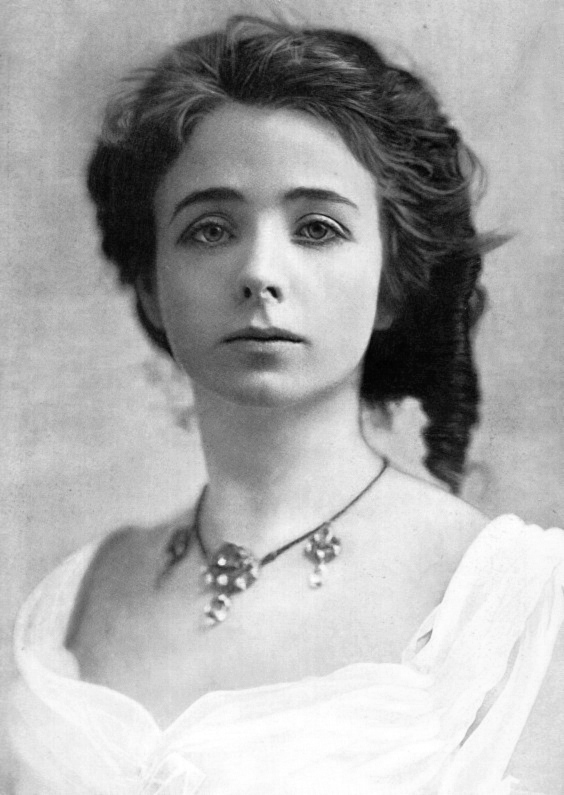
Maude Adams who was raised in a Utah Mormon home was a famous actress who had several romantic relationships with women.

- Maude Adams (1872–1953) was a famed actress who had several long-term romantic relationships with women. She was born in Salt Lake City to a Mormon mother and spent some of her early years from age 9 to 13 being raised in Salt Lake City by her Mormon grandmother and cousins. Although it is unknown whether Adams had ever identified as Mormon like her mother, she was never baptized Presbyterian despite attending one of their school and never joined Catholicism despite some stays at nunneries. She had additionally referred to her non-Mormon father as a "gentile", and invited the Mormon Tabernacle Choir to her 39th birthday performance.
- Mildred Berryman (1901–1972) was a pioneering researcher on lesbian and gay community in post-WWI Utah.

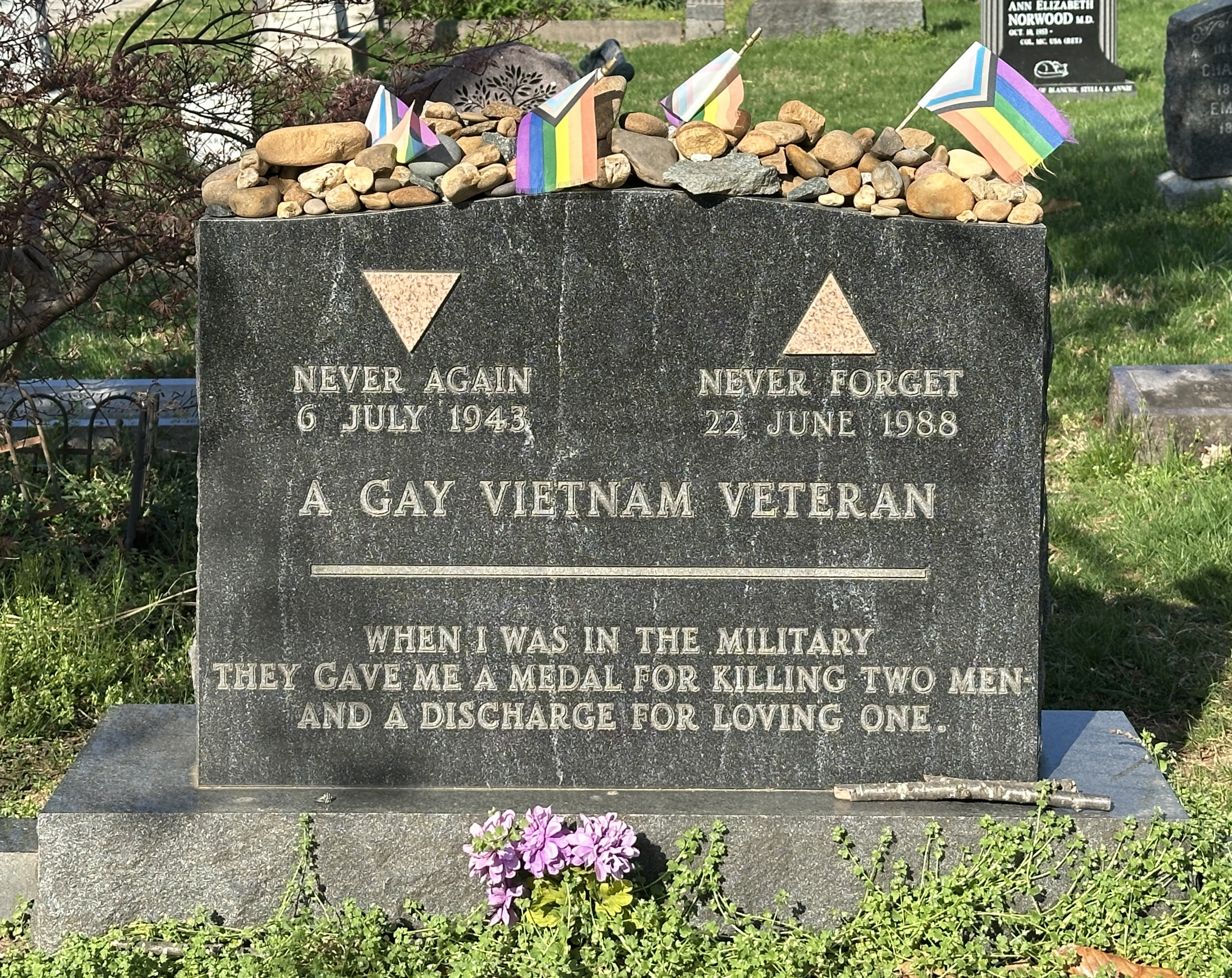
Sergeant Matlovich, was awarded a Bronze Star Medal for heroic service in the Vietnam War, but was discharged from the military and excommunicated from the LDS church for being gay.

- Sergeant Leonard Matlovich (1943–1988) was featured on the 8 September 1975 cover of Time magazine with the caption "I Am a Homosexual" for his challenging of the U.S. military ban against gay men and lesbian women. He was subsequently discharged from the military for openly stating his sexual orientation and excommunicated from the Church two months after the article was released.
- Robert McQueen (1942–1989) was the editor for the major LGBTQ news source Advocate in the late 70s and 80s. McQueen had ceased involvement with the LDS church in 1964 shortly after his mission in Austria and was excommunicated in 1979 after publishing several church-critical articles on the LGBT-LDS intersection. He died from complications due to AIDS on 8 October 1989.

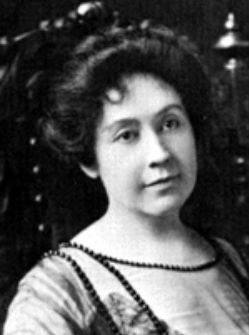
Actress Ada Dwyer Russell in 1916

- Michael Quinn is a well-known historian of Mormonism and former professor of history at BYU. He was excommunicated in September 1993 for publishing historical accounts he says revised traditional Mormon history. He then came out of the closet as gay and published Same Sex Dynamics Among Nineteenth-Century Americans: A Mormon Example in 1996. Quinn nevertheless identified as a Latter-day Saint and continued to believe in many LDS teachings.
- Natacha Rambova (1897–1966) was a Utah-born, Mormon-raised artistic director, costume designer, dancer and Egyptologist and is believed to have been bisexual, though there is disagreement there. She was the granddaughter of the apostle Heber Kimball and possibly had a romance with lesbian actress Alla Nazimova before marrying her possibly bisexual actor husband Rudolph Valentino.
- Ada Dwyer Russell (1863–1952) of Mormon upbringing was an actress and the long-term romantic partner of poet Amy Lowell.
- Trevor Southey (1940–2015) was a renowned painter and BYU student (1965–1969) and faculty member (1969–1979). He and his wife divorced and he came out as gay in 1982. He died at the age of 75.
- May Swenson (1913–1989) was a famous poet born in Logan, Utah to Swedish parents. She graduated from Utah State University and a few years later at age 22 she moved to the gay hotspot Greenwich Village in New York City to pursue her dreams of writing. She lived with her partner for 25 years and after decades of writing died at the age of 76.

Others individuals at the LGBT-Mormon intersection include Lino Brocka, Cam Clarke, Reed Cowan, C. Jay Cox, Nate Dushku, Angela Ellsworth, Steven Fales, Antonio A. Feliz, Michael Glatze, John C. Hamer, Todd Herzog, Roy Jeffs, Manny MUA, Sue-Ann Post, W. H. Pugmire, John W. Bryant, Patriarch Joseph Fielding Smith, and evidence exists that this list may include historical figures like May Anderson, Louie B. Felt, Evan Stephens, David Hyrum Smith, and John C. Bennett.

== Depiction in pop culture and media ==
LGBTQ Mormon characters and themes have been featured in many films, plays, and pieces of literature, with some examples listed below.

- Films: Latter Days, G.B.F., and The Falls trilogy
- Documentaries: Believer, Mormon No More, 8: The Mormon Proposition, Same-Sex Attracted, My Husband's Not Gay, Transmormon, Church and State, and A Long Way From Heaven
- TV series: Room 104, and The Catch
- Stage productions: Book of Mormon musical, Angels in America, 8, 14, Facing East, Confessions of a Mormon Boy, Bash: Latter-Day Plays, Little Happy Secrets, and Missa Solemnis or The Play About Henry
- Books (Fiction): Advise and Consent, Autoboyography, Leaving the Station, Let's Call It a Doomsday, Roland Rogers Isn't Dead Yet, His Right Hand
- Books (Nonfiction): Goodbye, I Love You, Mama's Boy: A Story from Our Americas, Tabernacles of Clay: Sexuality and Gender in Modern Mormonism, The Boughs of Love: Navigating the Queer Latter-day Saint Experience During an Ongoing Restoration, Swirling in the Eddy: LDS, Filipino, & Gay, Birds to Bones: Writings on Grief, Gender, Mormonism, and Magic, Queer Mormon Theology: An Introduction

== LGBTQ Mormon organizations ==
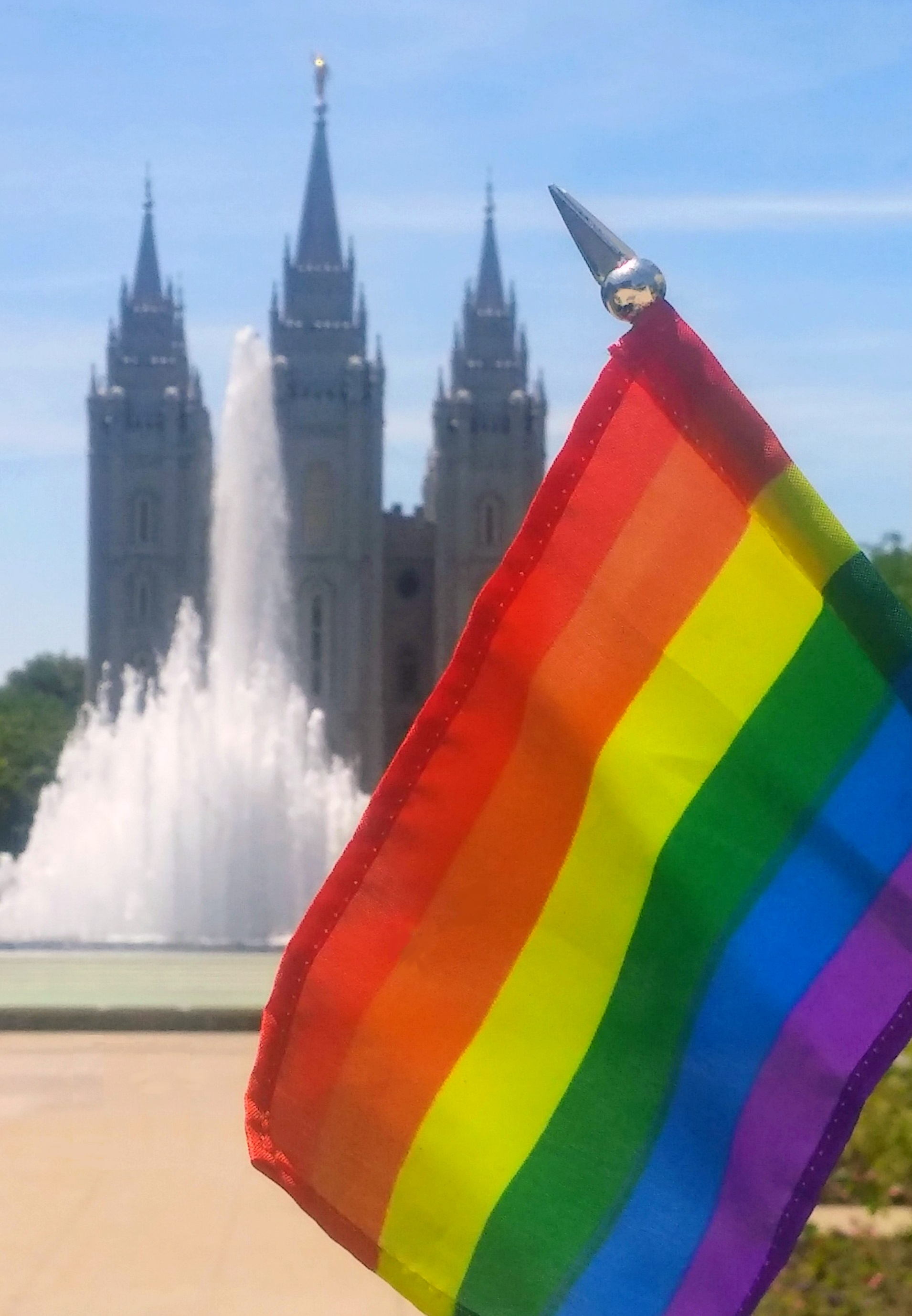
The LDS church does not sponsor any LGBTQ organizations.

The church neither encourages nor discourages support groups for those with same gender attractions. However, it does discourage members from participating in groups that foster homosexual conduct. Even though no support organization is officially sponsored by the church, several organizations have begun who have adopted theories and philosophies they believe are in line with church policy. Several church members have also joined ex-gay organizations. Some church members who identify as LGBTQ have also joined other support groups that seek changes in church doctrine, and greater church tolerance and awareness regarding LGBTQ topics. Several support groups are listed below:

=== Current organizations ===
- Affirmation: Gay & Lesbian Mormons is a support group originally organized in 1977 which aims to support "all affected by the nexus of homosexuality and Mormonism" by "becom[ing] a place of healing" and "avoid[ing] taking positions on how people choose to act on their sexuality or not." The group has expanded its mission to include bisexual, transgender, and intersex persons, and "avoid[s] taking positions on church doctrine."
- ALL Arizona LDS LGBT & Friends & Family is an Arizona-based group unaffiliated with North Star or Affirmation. They have an annual conference around April and monthly events including scripture study for those who feel unwelcome in church. Their "hope is to build and strengthen a community of Latter-day saints where LGBT/SSA Mormons feel loved and supported through what can be a challenging experience—being gay and being Mormon."
- Encircle is an LGBTQ resource center in Provo, Utah founded in 2016 by LDS individuals across from a Mormon temple. A church spokesperson welcomed the center saying it's good to see the property being used to serve LGBTQ people.
- Family Fellowship is for family members of lesbian, gay, bisexual, and/or transgender members and does not generally support church teachings about homosexuality.
- Harmony is an organization founded in 1982. It is closely associated with Community of Christ, although they do not have any formal relationship.
- I'll Walk With You is an organization collecting supportive videos featuring LDS parents of LGBTQ children and allies.
- LGBTQAI+ and Allies Club is an organization on the campus of Southern Virginia University, a predominantly-LDS liberal arts college in Buena Vista, Virginia. The group is recognized by the school but organized and run by students and volunteers with the support of multiple faculty members and local church leaders.
- Mama Dragons is a group for Mormon mothers and women supportive of LGBTQ persons.
- MoHo Directory is a global listing of over 100 gay Mormons and their blogs. For many, the MoHo Directory functions as a family of choice—a committed relationship network bound by friendship rather than blood.
- Mormons Building Bridges is a decentralized grassroots Facebook group, composed primarily of members of the LDS Church, who seek to improve the attitudes between members of the church and the LGBT community. The group's largest events are annual pride parade marches.
- North Star is an organization whose mission is to "provide a place of community for Latter-day Saints who experience homosexual attraction or gender identity incongruence, as well as their family, friends, and ecclesiastical leaders." The group supports the church's position that sexual relations are to be reserved for marriage between a man and woman, and aims to provide spiritual and social support for individuals and families who desire to live in harmony with church teachings. The organization takes "no official position on the origin or mutability of homosexual attractions or gender identity incongruence", and does not "endorse political causes or join political coalitions, including those officially sanctioned by the institutional Church."
- The OUT Foundation is an organization for prospective, current, and former LGBTQ Brigham Young University students. They provide scholarships for students who want to stay at BYU as well as financial support for students who want to transfer. They also partner with local therapists and the Rocky Mountain University of Health Professions to provide free counseling and gender-affirming voice therapy to students.
- USGA (Understanding Same-Gender Attraction) is an organization for LGBT Brigham Young University students and allies. The unofficial BYU group acts as the only group of its kind since there are no official LGBT-specific resources at BYU.

=== Past Organizations ===
Many homosexual Mormon support organizations sprung up and fell as social media technology changed. One published book's collection of resources for homosexual Mormons in the late 90s listed several email groups and online communities including Evergreen, Disciples2, LDS SSAers, and Q-Saints with most organization only leaving archived digital footprints.

- Disciples2 was a confidential online email support group from 1994 to about 2013 for what were termed male and female "strugglers" striving to follow church teachings.
- Evergreen International was an organization founded in 1989 for "people who want to diminish same-sex attractions and overcome homosexual behavior." It "sustains the doctrines and standards of The Church of Jesus Christ of Latter-day Saints without reservation or exception." In January 2014, Evergreen announced it would close and refer its clients to North Star.
- Gamofites was a support organization for homosexual Mormon and former-Mormon men with children from 1991 to 2012 hosting weekend retreats and publishing a newsletter.
- Gay LDS Young Adults (GLYA) was founded in March 2001 by Aaron Cloward and organized activities in the Intermountain West for gay Mormon young adults. They had over 400 people on their mailing list but seemed to be absorbed by Affirmation by about 2003. More sources:
- LDS Reconciliation was a group that held independent weekly meetings until 2012 in "home evening" type settings which "affirmed the spirituality of Gays and Lesbians and [sought] to provide a safe haven for individuals with a Latter-day Saint background to discuss the gospel of Jesus Christ. ... Reconciliation members [avoided] contention and criticism of any person or organization." It currently meets in combined Family Home Evenings with Affirmation.
- Restoration Church of Jesus Christ was a Mormon offshoot church started by Antonio Feliz that spanned from the 80s to 2010.
- United Order Family of Christ was a gay Mormon male commune in the 70s.
