= Homosexuality and the Church of Jesus Christ of Latter-day Saints =

The Church of Jesus Christ of Latter-day Saints (LDS Church) teaches that homosexual sexual activity is sinful under its law of chastity and that God does not approve of same-sex marriage. Adherents who participate in same-sex sexual behavior may face church discipline. Members of the church who experience homosexual attractions, including those who self-identify as gay, lesbian, or bisexual remain in good standing in the church if they abstain from same-sex marriage and any homosexual sexual activity or sexual relationships outside an opposite-sex marriage. However, all people, including those in same-sex relationships and marriages, are permitted to attend the weekly Sunday meetings.

In order to receive church ordinances such as baptism, and to enter church temples, adherents are required to practice sexual abstinence outside a legal marriage between one man and one woman. Additionally, in the church's plan of salvation noncelibate gay and lesbian individuals will not be allowed in the top tier of heaven to receive exaltation unless they repent during mortality, and a heterosexual marriage is a requirement for exaltation. The church's policies and treatment of LGBTQ people (Note: LGBTQ is an initialism for lesbian, gay, bisexual, transgender and queer or questioning which functions as an umbrella term broadly referring to all sexualities, romantic orientations, sex characteristics, and gender identities that are not heterosexual, heteroromantic, cisgender, or endosex.) have long been a source of controversy both within and outside the church, and a notable cause of disagreement and disaffection among members.

The LDS Church has campaigned against government recognition of same-sex marriage, and the topic of same-sex marriage has been one of the church's foremost public concerns since 1993. It has also supported legislation protecting members of the LGBTQ community against discrimination in employment, that also exempt religious institutions from honoring these protections. As of 2018, penalties from church leaders are stiffer for same-sex sexual sins than for heterosexual ones in matters of general church discipline, missionary requirements, and code of conduct enforcement at church-run universities.

The church's statements and actions throughout its history have overwhelmingly focused on male homosexuality, and only rarely on female homosexuality (lesbianism) or bisexuality. Church leaders previously taught that homosexuality was a curable condition. They counseled members that they could and should change their attractions, and provided conversion therapy and programs with that goal. From 1976 until 1989, the church handbook of policies called for church discipline for members attracted to the same sex, punishing merely being homosexual with sanctions similar to those for acts of adultery and child molestation. Even celibate gay people were subject to excommunication.

More recent church publications state that individuals do not choose same-sex attractions, and the church opposes conversion therapy. Church-run therapy services no longer provide sexual orientation change efforts. and the church has no official stance on the causes of homosexuality. Current teachings indicate that members who experience same-sex attraction may either pursue a mixed-orientation marriage with an opposite-sex partner or remain celibate

== Overview ==
=== Summarized changes in teachings through the decades ===
Since the first recorded mentions of homosexuality by top church leaders, teachings and policies around the nature, etiology, mutability, and identity around same-sex romantic and physical attractions have seen many changes through the decades. Church teachings and rhetoric regarding homosexuality have shifted over time. In earlier decades, some global church leaders (called general authorities) suggested various possible causes of homosexuality—including addiction, environmental influences, family dynamics, and selfishness —while generally dismissing biological explanation The church has since reversed many of its stances around homosexuality, including moving to a stance of neutrality on the origins of homosexuality, and acknowledging by implication that past leaders' encouragement of mixed-orientation marriages may have been erroneous. A table summarizing some of the major shifts in official dialogue is shown below.

Summary of changes in teachings on homosexuality
| Topic | Earlier teachings | Transitional teachings | Current teachings |
|---|---|---|---|
| Inborn | No | Maybe | No position |
| Causes | Addiction, masturbation, pornography, family dysfunction, smothering mother, distant or weak father, sexual abuse, selfishness, speaking about it, gender non-conforming dress or behavior | Biological and environmental factors | No position |
| Identity and labels | Wrong to use gay labels | | Identifying as gay is acceptable |
| Sexual orientation change efforts | Electroshock aversion therapy recommended, reparative therapy encouraged, curable disease, should be overcome | Conversion therapy may be appropriate, denounces any abusive practices | Church opposed to it, and church therapists no longer practice it |
| Heterosexual dating and marriage | As a therapeutic step | | Not to be seen as a therapy or solution |
| Descriptors used by leaders | Filthy, obscene, monstrous, devilish, degenerate, abominable, gross, evil, deviant, vicious, perverted, wicked, malady, contaminating | Unnatural, burden, impure, gender disorientation, weakness, tendency, selfish, distortion and perversion, addictive behavior | Trial, struggle, challenge, mortal test, difficult, hopeless, powerful inclination, immoral |

Though the church's position of homosexual behavior as sinful has remained the same, the tone in rhetoric from top leaders has transitioned to sympathetic concern for those "afflicted" with same-sex attraction. Some researchers from the Journal for the Scientific Study of Religion argue that this shift is ultimately just reproducing the same anti-LGBTQ rhetoric, but disguising it "in a kinder package" with a "gentler façade" to deflect criticism of overt homophobia, and that this rhetoric serves to strengthen institutional church power and the heterosexual subordination of LGBTQ people despite their growing societal acceptance. In reference to the harsh rhetoric on homosexuality of the past, the apostle D. Todd Christofferson stated in 2015, "I think we can express things better." The same year the apostle Dallin H. Oaks spoke on the topic saying, "I know that the history of the church is not to seek apologies or to give them. We sometimes look back on issues and say, 'Maybe that was counterproductive for what we wish to achieve,' but we look forward and not backward."

Previous teachings that have changed include the belief that homosexual attractions themselves were not inborn, and a curable illness. In 1959, in response to a rash of arrests of gay men in Utah and Idaho, church president David O. McKay appointed the apostles Spencer W. Kimball and Mark E. Petersen to focus on "curing" gay members. That same year the church's largest school Brigham Young University (BYU) began its on-campus electroshock aversion therapy program attempting to eliminate or diminish homosexual attractions which lasted over three decades into the mid-1990s. At the time, the American Psychiatric Association (APA) classified homosexuality as a mental illness in its Diagnostic and Statistical Manual of Mental Disorders (DSM), and Kimball adamantly stated on multiple occasions that it could and should be cured. Kimball also taught that local church leaders could influence gay members by quoting scripture to them, appealing to their reason, encouraging them to abandon gay lovers and associates, praying with them, and encouraging them to replace any sexual expression of homosexual feelings with heterosexual dating. In 1973 the APA removed homosexuality from the DSM, and in 1990 the World Health Organization (WHO) removed homosexuality from its list of disorders in the International Classification of Diseases.

Later, the church softened its stance on gay feelings, instead shifting to a focus on homosexuality as a behavior that should be overcome. This change was reflected in a 1992 guidebook update removing all previous references to homosexuality as a disease. Top leaders also taught on several occasions from the 1970s to the early 2000s that homosexual feeling may stem from a confusion over one's gender identity or gender roles. Since then the church has acknowledged the differences between gender identity and sexual orientation.

Some changes in teachings have seemed abrupt and contradictory as was the case in 1995 when a First Presidency leader affirmed in the church's Ensign magazine that the idea of an inborn homosexual orientation was a false belief with no scientific evidence, reasoning that if homosexuality were inborn it would frustrate God's plan. In the next month's edition, however the apostle Oaks refuted those statements (though without referring to them directly) by asserting that inheritance may have a complex relationship with a person's homosexual orientation.

=== In canonized scripture ===
The entire body of canonized LDS scriptures (i.e. the Bible, the Book of Mormon, the Pearl of Great Price, and Doctrine and Covenants) is silent on same-sex sexual activity, except for the Bible. However, one man's heterosexual misconduct (coupled with forsaking a ministry) was described in the Book of Mormon as the "most abominable above all sins save it be the shedding of innocent blood or denying the Holy Ghost." The church interprets certain Bible passages as forbidding same-sex erotic behavior.

=== Proposed historical tolerance ===
LDS historian Greg Prince wrote that prior to 1968 there was no standardized church response to homosexual attractions and intercourse, and that the most frequent response for over a century had been "benign neglect". Similarly, the LDS-raised historian D. Michael Quinn stated that early church leaders had a more tolerant view of homosexuality given that during the 19th century, the church (like American society as a whole) was relatively tolerant of same-sex intimate relationships. Quinn also stated that several prominent Utahns were not disciplined after stating they were living in romantic relationships with their same-sex domestic partners (though historic evidence often only hints at and does not prove sex between particular individuals). For example Mormon Tabernacle Choir director Evan Stephens never married a woman but had intimate relationships and shared a bed with a series of male domestic partners and traveling companions. These relationships were described with a euphemism in a church magazine.

Also notable was the relationship of Louise B. Felt and May Anderson, the church's first two general presidents of Primary, the church's organization for children. They lived together in the same bedroom for decades and were referred to by other top Primary leaders as the "David and Jonathan" of Primary. Additionally, LDS-raised sociologist Kimball Young cited the early church's practice of sealing men to each other as evidence of latent same-sex romantic desires.

=== Early instances ===
There were several known or alleged instances of members participating in same-sex sexual and romantic relationships in the 19th century and early 20th century. These include the young man George Naylor, the actress Ada Russell, and the researcher Mildred Berryman. During the early days of the church, when same-sex sexual activity by a member was suspected, the accused was sometimes disfellowshipped or excommunicated, and from 1852 on, under the church-controlled Utah Territory legislature, any sex between males was punished by the courts. Just over a decade after the church's founding the first known instance of church discipline for same-sex sexual activity occurred over the alleged acts between church leader John Bennett and Francis Higbee. Historian Valeen Avery has suggested that one of church founder Joseph Smith's sons, David Hyrum Smith (born in 1844, died in 1904), may have been gay.

==== Patriarch Joseph Fielding Smith ====
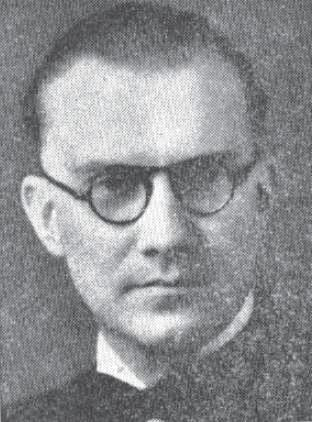
Patriarch Smith was released amidst accusations of homosexual affairs

One of the more prominent instances of same-sex erotic activity by a Mormon man in the early 20th century was that of the presiding patriarch Joseph Fielding Smith. He served in the position only four years before being released by church president George Albert Smith, reportedly for reasons of "ill health." However, there is evidence he had been involved in several gay affairs with at least three men.

=== Increasing attention from leadership ===
Though the terms "homosexuality" was in use in the United States (US) since 1892, the first instance of the term "homosexuality" in senior church leadership public discourse was in a 1952 General Conference speech. The first time homosexuality was explicitly discussed in the church's Handbook of Instructions was in the 1968 edition, over 130 years into the church's history. Quinn has suggested that early LDS Church leaders had a more tolerant view of homosexuality, but leaders like then apostle Gordon B. Hinckley have stated that top leaders have always considered homosexual behavior a serious sin. It appears that by the 1940s church leaders developed a greater preoccupation with homosexual behavior, as by 1947 apostle Charles Callis was assigned to handle cases of church members suspected of or having confessed to same-sex sexual behavior. Additionally, surveillance had been organized in 1945 to stop reported male-male sexual activity in the church's (now-demolished) Deseret Gymnasium steam room. Callis was succeeded in his appointment over homosexual cases by the apostle Spencer W. Kimball in 1947. Kimball began sharing this role with apostle Mark E. Petersen in 1959. Within eight years they had collectively counseled over one thousand individuals on the topic of homosexuality. From 1969 through at least 2013, nearly every year saw at least a mention of homosexuality in top leaders' discourse in general conference and the church's main magazine. From the 1950s into the 1990s top leaders taught that homosexuality was a problem correlated with the destruction of American society. Additionally, from the 1970s into at least the present they taught it was related to the destruction of the family, and a contradiction of God-given gender norms.

== Current beliefs and policies ==
As of 2024, all homosexual or same-sex sexual activity is forbidden by the church in its law of chastity, and the church teaches that God does not approve of same-sex marriage. Adherents who participate in same-sex sexual behavior may face church discipline. As of 2018, penalties from church leaders are stiffer for same-sex transgressions than for heterosexual ones in general church discipline, missionary requirements, and honor code enforcement at church-owned universities. Members of the church who experience homosexual attractions, including those who self-identify as gay, lesbian, or bisexual remain in good standing in the church if they abstain from same-sex marriage and all sexual relations outside an opposite-sex marriage. All people, however, including those participating in same-sex activity and relationships, are permitted to attend weekly church worship services. According to church teachings, after their deaths non-celibate gay and lesbian individuals will not be allowed in the top tier of heaven to receive unless they repent, and a heterosexual marriage is a requirement for exaltation. In the LDS Church's cosmology God the Father is a heterosexual man married to at least one Heavenly Mother, and reproduction for exalted beings is an important element of the afterlife. The church teaches that homosexual behavior has always been a grievous sin, and it no longer holds a position on the origins of homosexuality.

=== Baptismal requirements ===
In order to receive church ordinances such as baptism, and to participate in temple rites, adherents are required to abstain from same-sex relations or any sexual activity outside a legal marriage between one man and one woman. As of 2019, when baptismal candidates confess during a baptismal interview to having committed any "homosexual transgression", they require special clearance from a full-time mission president in order to be baptized. Any past heterosexual activity, however, does not require special clearance from a higher leader (unless the person is still cohabiting with any sexual partner out of wedlock).

=== Missionary service requirements ===
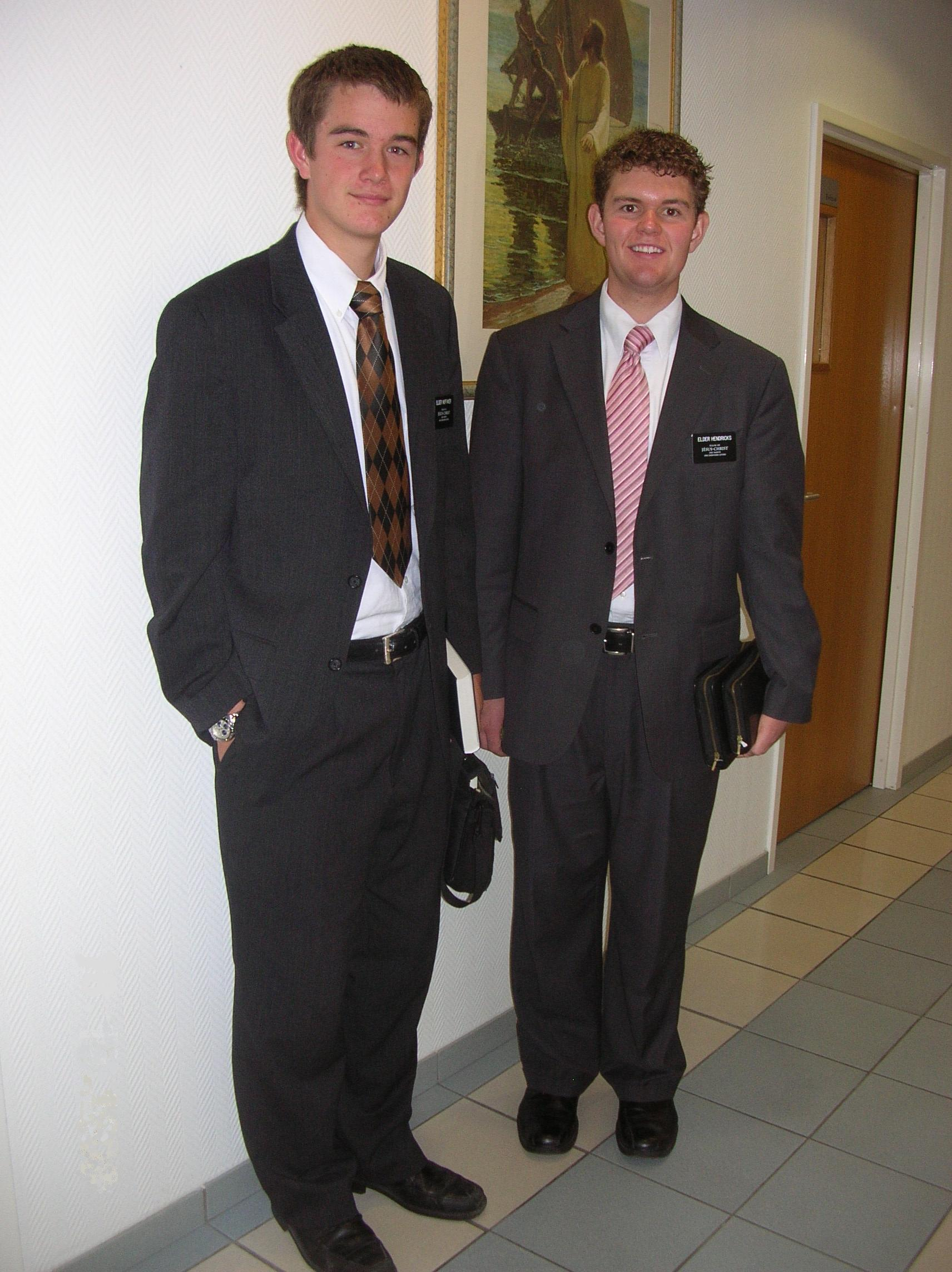
Full-time, young adult, proselyting missionaries typically commit to 18–24 months of full-time service. Openly gay (but celibate) members are allowed to be missionaries.

Currently, openly gay youth can serve a full-time proselyting mission for the church if they abstain from sexual activity. Although sex of any kind before a heterosexual marriage may permanently bar a person from serving as a church missionary, any homosexual acts from the age of 15 and later almost always disqualifies a missionary candidate for service (even after years of subsequent celibacy) except "in rare cases".

=== Pro-LGBTQ teachings ===
In 1999, church president Gordon B. Hinckley publicly welcomed lesbian and gay people into LDS congregations, and in an interview affirmed them as "good people". Church leaders have spoken out against "gay-bashing" and other physical or verbal assaults on those involved in homosexual relationships. They have also encouraged members to befriend gay members. The church website now implicitly acknowledges the biological causes of homosexuality.

=== November 2015 policy change ===
In November 2015, the church updated its policies regarding those in legal same-sex unions, stating that such couples are apostates from the church. These policies also barred such couples' children—either adopted or biological—from being baptized, confirmed, ordained, or participating in mission service until reaching adulthood or obtaining parental consent and permission from the First Presidency. Prior to this, local leadership had more discretion on whether or how far to pursue church disciplinary action against members in same-sex marriages. The policy was controversial and received national criticism.

==== The reversal ====
In April 2019, the church reversed its policy on couples in same-sex marriages, no longer automatically treating same-sex marriage as apostasy for church discipline. Additionally, children of same-sex couples would now be allowed to receive blessings from a priesthood holder in good standing, and be baptized without First Presidency approval. However, it still considered same-sex marriage to be a "serious transgression", and may discipline church members involved in any same-sex sexual activity.

=== Terminology used by the church ===
Church leaders now teach that it is acceptable to identify as gay. Previously, church leaders stated that the terms "homosexual", "lesbian", and "gay" should only be used as adjectives to describe feelings or behaviors, and not to describe people. Church leaders have referred to homosexuality as a sexual orientation. Since the 1990s through at least 2015, church leaders have tended to use the term "same-gender attraction" (SGA) instead of "homosexuality" in official publications. Many members have reflected that language in their self-identifications, with its use being interpreted as an in-group signalling of adherence to LDS teachings on sexuality.

=== Homosexuality after death ===
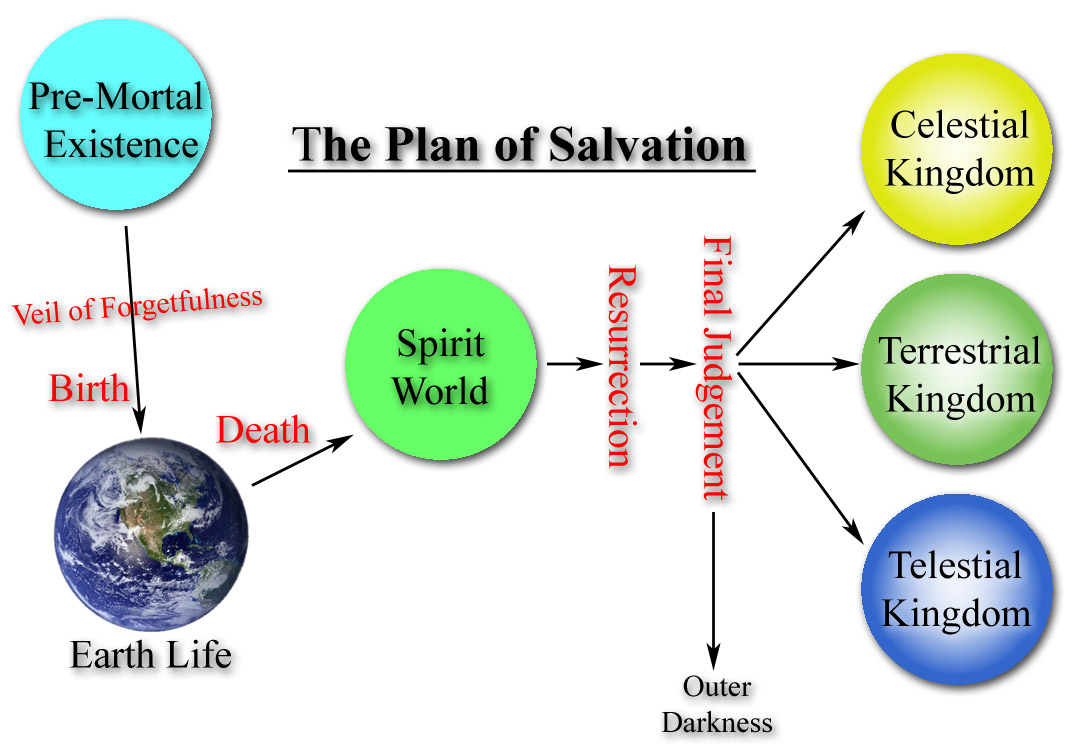
A diagrammed timeline of humanity according to LDS teachings called the plan of salvation showing potential destinations on the right side after death.

According to religious scholar Taylor G. Petrey, much of the LDS Church's opposition to same-sex relationships stems from its current teachings on the afterlife and the kinds of relationships that will exist there. On several occasions between 2006 and 2009, multiple top leaders stated that attractions to those of the same sex won't exist after death, saying "it must be true" that "gay or lesbian inclinations" will "not exist post-mortality", and only occur "right now in mortality." The 2007 church publication "God Loveth His Children" stated that, "others may not be free of this challenge [of same-gender attraction] in this life" but that "our bodies, feelings, and desires will be perfected in the next life so that every one of God's children may find joy in a family."

The 2012 church website MormonsAndGays.org also stated that "a person's attraction to the same sex can be addressed and borne as a mortal test. It should not be viewed as a permanent condition. ... some people ... may not have the opportunity to marry a person of the opposite sex in this life, a just God will provide them with ample opportunity to do so in the next." In the church's plan of salvation noncelibate gay and lesbian individuals will not be allowed in the top tier of heaven to receive what's called exaltation to become like God unless they repent, and a heterosexual marriage is a requirement. Author Charlotte Scholl Shurtz stated that the focus on Heavenly Parents as a cisgender, heterosexual couple enshrines heteronormativity and teaches that heterosexuality is an essential prerequisite to godhood. She further said that current teachings deny exaltation and godhood for LGBTQ people unless they eternally perform a cisgender, heterosexual relationship after death.

== Leader and member actions towards LGBTQ individuals ==
The church has occasionally addressed the treatment and views of LGBT+ members. Church leaders have given discretion to local leaders on whether to hold church courts for suspected homosexual members, with options ranging from acquittal to excommunication. In 2000 the apostle Packer addressed part of a speech to gay and lesbian youth stating church leaders don't reject, but rather love them, and show their love by teaching and disciplining them. Additionally, the 2007 church pamphlet "God Loveth His Children" stated that some gay members had felt rejection by other members, and criticized members who did not show them love. The document asked gay members to show love and kindness to help other church members become less rejecting. From 1976 until 1989 under president Kimball the church handbook called for church discipline for members attracted to the same sex equating merely being homosexual with the seriousness of acts of adultery and child molestation—even celibate gay people were subject to excommunication. Kimball's numerous publications discussing "curing" homosexuality and condemning same-sex attractions (even without action), and his rise to the church presidency in 1973 set the stage for years of harsh treatment of gay church members.

=== LGBTQ experiences ===
Many current and former members of the church´are attracted to people of the same sex, and they have had a range of positive and negative experiences with their own spiritual lives in the church and with leaders and other members. For example, one member who dated other men reported never having problems with his local leaders. Another instance was a Church employee who described in a 2011 article how his stake president denied his temple recommend (resulting in him getting fired from his job) simply because of his friendship with other gay men and his involvement in a charity bingo for Utah Pride. One former LDS bishop and temple ordinance officiator Antonio A. Feliz said that his Peruvian mission was directed in the early 1960s by South American area authorities to not teach known homosexuals. Several church employees have been fired, or pressured to leave for being gay (despite their celibacy), or for expressing support of LGBTQ rights. Research has found many nonheterosexual members have significant difficulty reconciling their sexual and religious identities. In his 2026 memoir Devout, queer musician and former member David Archuleta writes that the apostle M. Russell Ballard allegedly told him that the Quorum of the Twelve has prayed about LGBTQ+ issues but have not received an answer from God.

=== Polls on member views ===
Numerous surveys have been conducted to gauge LDS member views on LGBTQ topics. In a 2007 US poll, only one-fourth (24%) of members agreed that "homosexuality is a way of life that should be accepted" (less than any other major religious group in the survey except for Jehovah's Witnesses), and two-thirds (68%) of LDS adherents said it should be discouraged. In a similar poll seven years later there were small changes with one-third (36%) saying homosexuality should be accepted, and about half (57%) stating it should be discouraged.

A 2017 poll found that 40% of LDS members supported same-sex marriage while a slim majority (53%) were opposed. In the same poll two-thirds (69%) of adherents supported laws that protect LGBTQ Americans against discrimination in employment, housing, and public accommodations. However, half (53%) of church members said small private business should be able to deny products and services to gay or lesbian people for religious reasons.

Older surveys from the 20th century include a 1977 Utah poll in which three-fourths of LDS-identified responders opposed equal rights for gay teachers or ministers and 62% favored discrimination against gay people in business and government (versus two-thirds and 38% respectively of non-LDS responders). The same poll found that members ranked homosexuality as after only murder and adultery in degree of sinfulness, and two years later a 1980 poll found that members ranked homosexuality as the number one most serious sin. At BYU a 1997 poll found that 1/3 of male students would avoid befriending a gay student and 42% of all students believed that even celibate, honor-code-following gay members should be banned from attending the university.

== Views on gender diversity and identity ==
Expressions and identities for sexuality and gender are "separate, but related" aspects of a person and stem from similar biological origins. The church has acknowledged differences between gender identity and sexual orientation stating that leaders have "unfinished business in teaching on [transgender situations]." Gender identity and gender roles play an important part in Latter-Day Saint teachings which assert a strict binary of spiritual gender for spirit bodies. Leaders say every person's spirit body is a literal offspring of Heavenly Parents. According to current church policy, transgender and other gender diverse members who have undergone an "elective transsexual operation" are banned from temple rites or receiving priesthood authority. Additionally, a transgender baptismal candidate who had already undergone gender-confirming surgery can only be baptized with First Presidency approval, and a person currently considering such a surgery is barred from baptism. As of 2020 members who even non-surgically gender transition will receive membership restrictions, particularly with respect to priesthood and temple ordinances.

== LGBTQ Mormon people and organizations ==
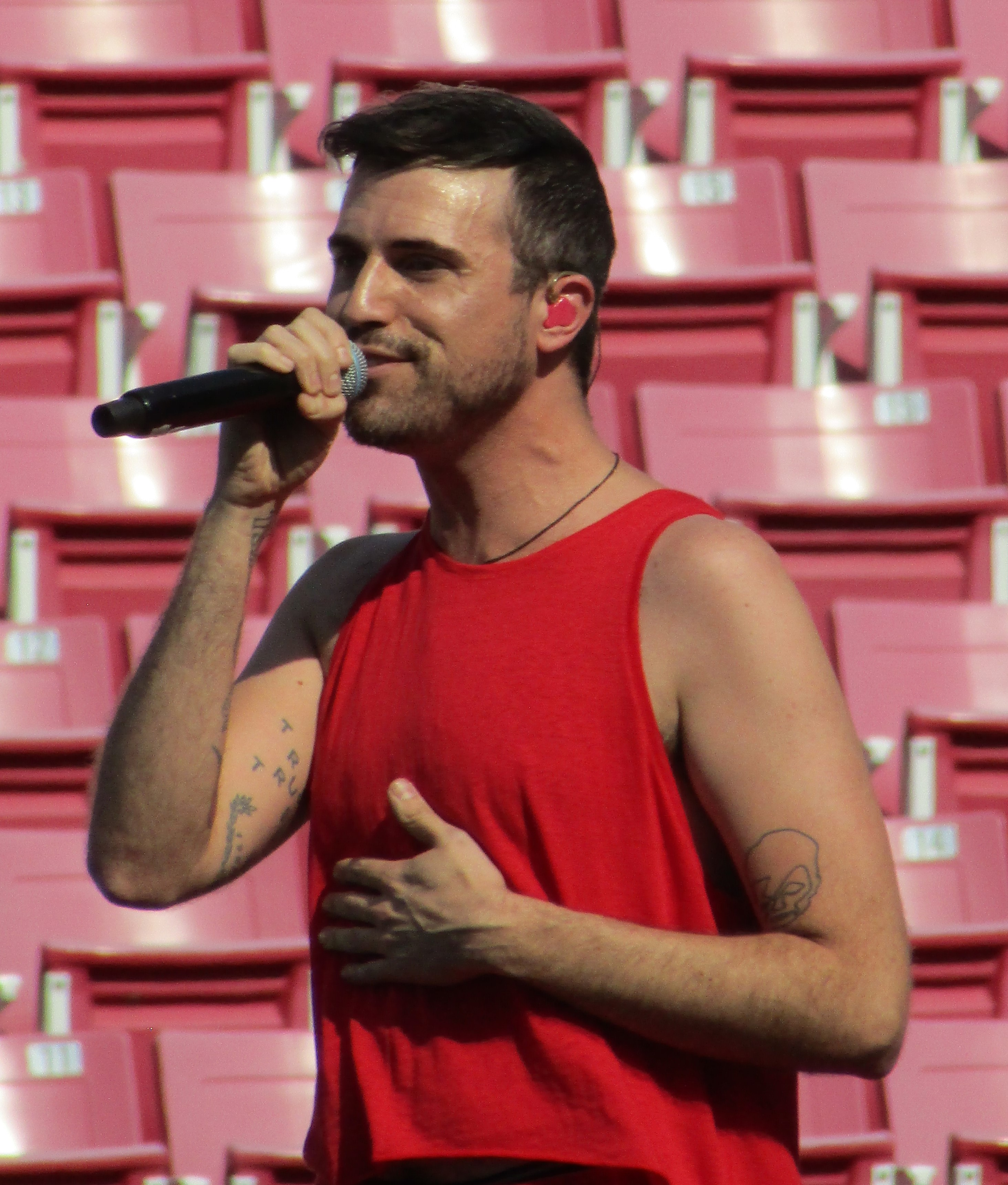
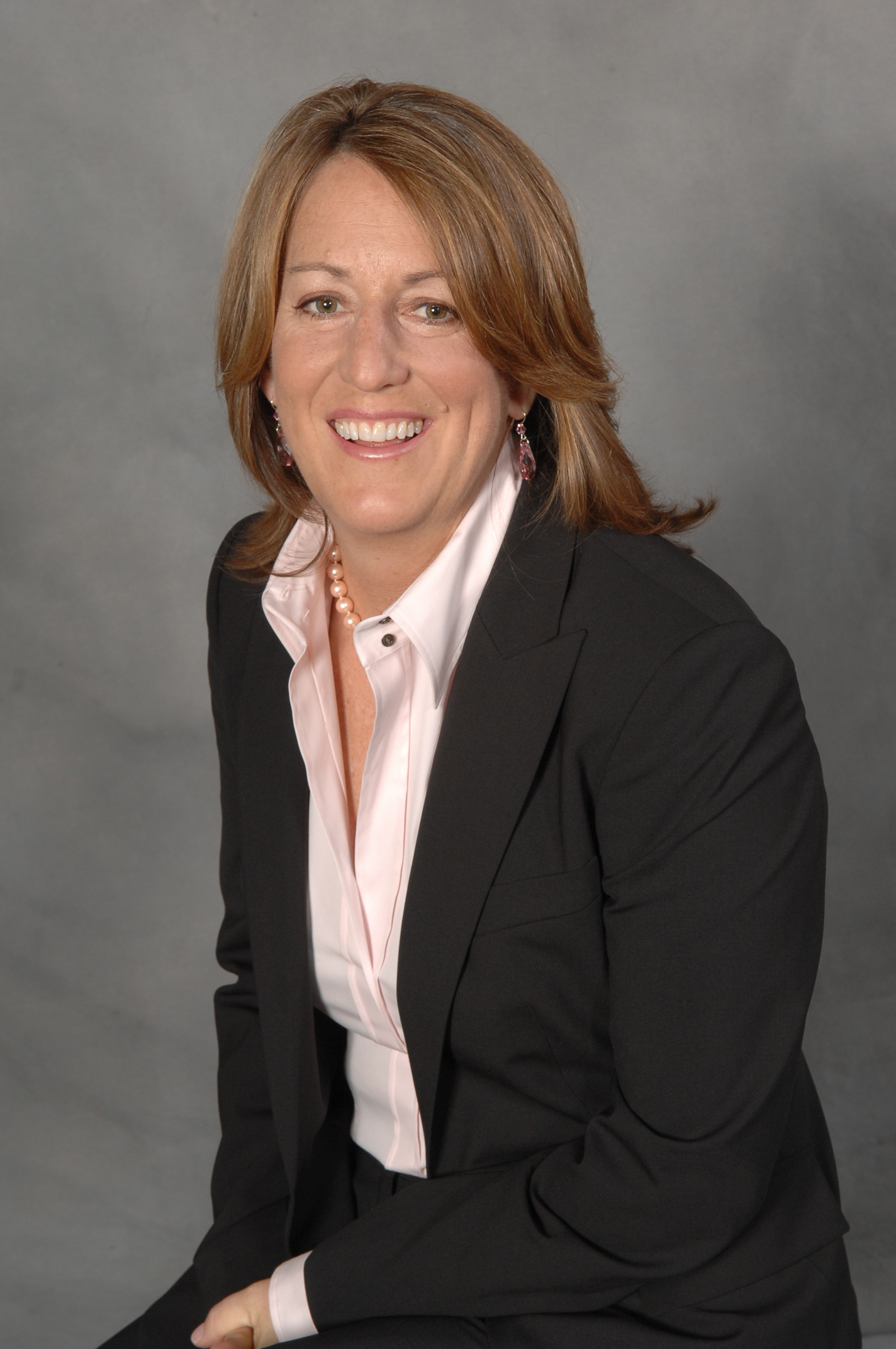
Two nationally recognized LGBTQ former Mormons, Tyler Glenn (left) and Kate Kendell

=== Statistics ===
Though there are no official numbers for how many members of the LDS Church identify their romantic orientation as gay, bisexual, or lesbian, Large surveys as recent as 2020 at the predominantly LDS BYU have found over 13% of students had marked their sexual orientation as something other than "strictly heterosexual". A 1972 study showed that between 10 and 13 percent of college-aged LDS men reported past experimentation with male-male sexual activity, which was similar to the percentage of non-LDS men. Another poll of BYU students in 1997 found that 10% had a gay family member and 69% knew someone attracted to those of the same sex. Gary Watts, former president of Family Fellowship, estimated in 2007 that only 10 percent of gay members stayed active in the church.

=== LGBTQ LDS people ===
Prominent LGBTQ or same-sex attracted church members include the apostle Christofferson's brother Tom, and therapist Ty Mansfield. Prominent LGBTQ former members include writer Dustin Lance Black, singer Tyler Glenn, historian D. Michael Quinn, gay rights activist Leonard Matlovich, and attorney Kate Kendell.

=== LGBTQ LDS organizations ===
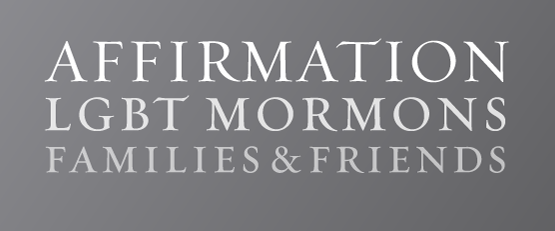
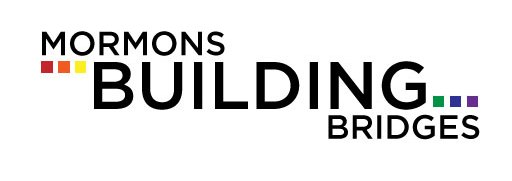
Some principal homosexual Mormon groups

Organizations that have supported members and former members attracted to those of the same sex include Affirmation, North Star, Mormons Building Bridges, Mama Dragons, Evergreen International, USGA. Previous break-off LDS-based churches for LGBTQ people included the United Order Family of Christ in the 70s and the Restoration Church of Jesus Christ in the 80s.

=== Depiction in pop culture and media ===
LGBTQ Mormon characters and themes have been featured in many films, plays, and pieces of literature, with some examples listed below:

- Films: Latter Days, G.B.F., and The Falls trilogy
- Documentaries: Believer, Mormon No More, 8: The Mormon Proposition, Same-Sex Attracted, My Husband's Not Gay, Transmormon, and Church and State
- TV series: Room 104, and The Catch
- Stage productions: Book of Mormon musical, Angels in America, 8, 14, Facing East, Confessions of a Mormon Boy, and Missa Solemnis or The Play About Henry
- Books: Advise and Consent

== Criticism and controversies ==
The church's policies and treatment of LGBTQ people has long been a source of controversy both inside and outside the church and a significant cause of disagreement and disaffection by members.

=== Among members ===
A 2011 online survey of over 3,000 individuals who no longer believe church truth claims found that around ten percent would consider returning if (among several changes) LGBTQ persons were accepted and treated equally. Past leaders' teachings on reparative therapy and the origins of homosexuality have also been criticized. DezNat has been criticized for promoting homophobia and harassment against LGBTQ people, reflecting a broader pattern of bigotry within the movement.

=== Among the public ===
The controversial policies for LGBTQ persons has made an impression on the general public. A 2003 nationwide Pew Research Center survey of over 1,000 LGBTQ Americans found that 83% of them said the LDS Church was "generally unfriendly towards lesbian, gay, bisexual, and transgender people" surpassed only by "the Muslim religion" at 84%. Additionally, in May 2008 a Georgia Tech gay-rights manual referred to the LDS Church as "anti-gay." After two students sued the school for discrimination, a judge ordered that the material be removed.

=== Packer's address ===
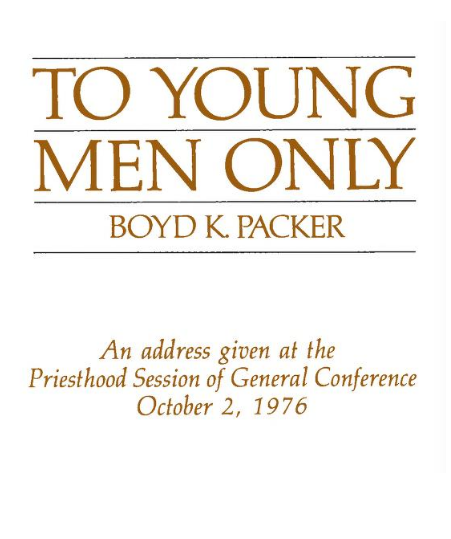
Packer's conference address published here has been criticized of condoning anti-gay violence.

One general conference address later distributed as a pamphlet that generated controversy was Packer's "To Young Men Only" which condones an example of a male missionary who punched his missionary companion for making romantic advances with Packer stating, "Well, thanks. Somebody had to do it". Historians Michael Quinn and Connell O'Donovan have argued these comments "essentially advocated anti-Gay violence", and that the church itself endorsed such behavior by continuing to publish Packer's speech in pamphlet form. Former bishop David Hardy also condemned the pamphlet and other publications as promoting violence against gay people, and providing harmful misinformation to his gay son. In 1995, Oaks said, "Our doctrines obviously condemn those who engage in so-called 'gay bashing'—physical or verbal attacks on persons thought to be involved in homosexual or lesbian behavior". In 2016, the church ceased publishing the pamphlet, and removed it from the church website.

=== Protests ===
The policies and treatment of LGBTQ individuals have prompted several protests and mass resignations including the following:

- November 2, 2008 – Hundreds of people gathered at the Salt Lake City library in a protest of Prop 8 organized by LDS mothers of gay children.
- November 6, 2008 – In Los Angeles over two thousand people protested at the LDS temple over the LDS Church's heavy involvement in the recent passing of California's Prop 8 banning same-sex marriage.
- November 7, 2008 – Three days after Prop 8 passed nearly five thousand protesters gathered at the Salt Lake Temple. That evening a candlelight vigil by about 600 mothers of LGBTQ children was also held at the Salt Lake Temple.
- October 7, 2010 – Thousands of individuals surrounded Temple Square in protest of Boyd K. Packer's "Cleansing the Inner Vessel" conference address in which he characterized same-sex physical attractions as impure and unnatural tendencies that could be overcome.
- November 14, 2015 – In response to a policy change on members in same-sex marriages and their children, 1,500 members gathered across from the church's offices to submit their resignation letters, with thousands more resigning online in the weeks after.

== Sexual orientation change efforts ==
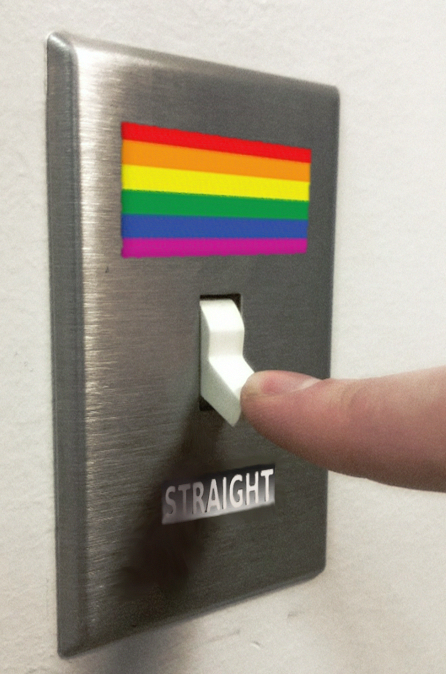
The 2011 Broadway musical The Book of Mormon satirized church teachings on changing sexual orientation with an LDS missionary character saying he could "turn it off like a light switch" in reference to his gay feelings.

Because of its ban against same-sex sexual activity and same-sex marriage the LDS Church has a long history of teaching that its adherents who are attracted to the same sex can and should attempt to alter their feelings through righteous striving and sexual orientation change efforts (also called conversion therapy or reparative therapy). These teachings and policies left homosexual members with the option of potentially harmful attempts to change their sexual orientation, entering a mixed-orientation opposite-sex marriage (MOM), or living a celibate lifestyle without any sexual expression (including masturbation). In 2019 the church reversed its implied and previously explicit endorsement of conversion therapy, and now opposes it.

=== Self-help ===
In the 60s and 70s Church leaders taught that homosexuality was a curable disease and they encouraged self-help attempts by homosexual members to change their sexual orientation and cultivate heterosexual feelings. While the LDS Church has somewhat softened its stance toward LGBTQ individuals in recent years, leaders continued to communicate into 2015 that changing one's sexual orientation was possible through personal righteousness, prayer, faith in Christ, psychotherapy, and group therapy and retreats. Conversion therapy has been shown to be unethical and harmful.

=== BYU aversion therapy program ===
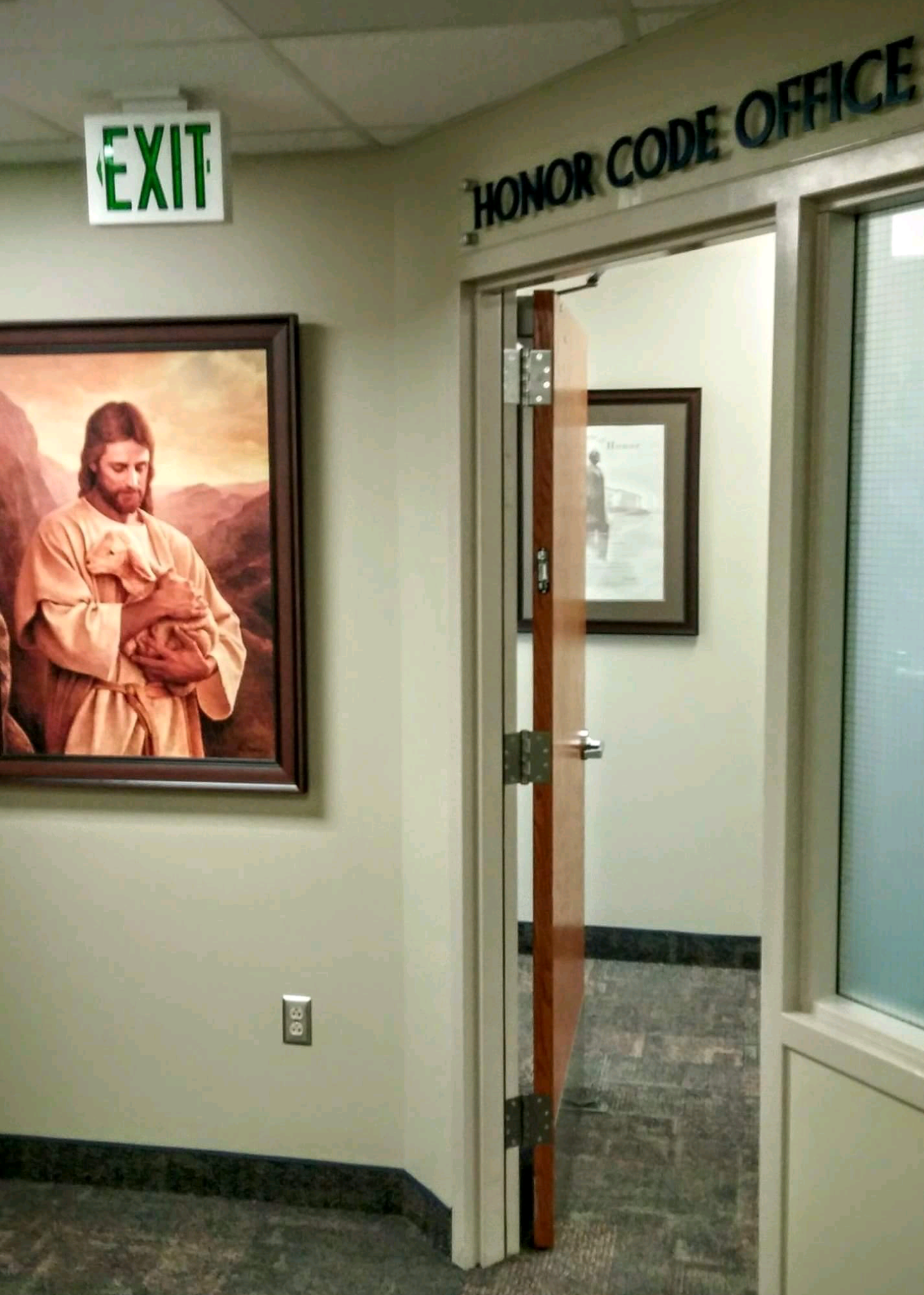
BYU's Honor Code office required some students reported for homosexual behavior to undergo electroshock and vomit aversion therapies in the 1970s

To assist in members' efforts for sexual orientation change, church leaders developed an aversion therapy program on BYU campus for gay adolescents and adults in 1959 since simply being attracted to people of the same sex was an excommunicable sin under church president Kimball. The on-campus aversion therapy program lasted into the mid-1990s.

=== Therapist-led conversion therapy efforts ===
Teachings later changed as it became clear these self-help and aversive techniques were not working. From the 80s to the 2000s reparative therapy (also called conversion therapy) became the dominant treatment method, and it was often recommended by the church-endorsed group Evergreen. Member attitudes reflected church leaders'. For example, in a 2010 survey of 625 Utah residents, 55% of LDS-identified respondents believed sexual orientation could be changed, and a 2015 survey of 1,612 LGBTQ Mormons and former Mormons found that 73% of men and 43% of women had attempted sexual orientation change, usually through multiple methods across many years. Local church leaders sometimes used church funds to pay for these therapies into at least 2015.

=== Decline ===
Counselor-led sexual orientation change efforts were declining among members around 2015 as church teachings evolved. Leaders had explicitly stated in the 2012 "MormonsAndGays" website that same-sex sexual attractions were not a choice, and affirmed in the 2016 "MormonAndGay" update that therapy focusing on a change in sexual orientation was unethical (the approach church leaders had used for decades). The 2016 update, however still offered qualified statements that reparative therapy should be an option, and promised that orientation change could occur. The implicit endorsement of conversion therapy was overturned in 2019 when a church representative stated, "We are opposed to conversion therapy and our therapists do not practice it."

== Mixed-orientation marriage ==
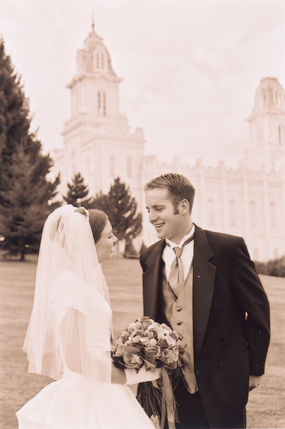
A couple in front of an LDS temple following their temple sealing marriage ceremony. LDS leaders have stated that opposite-sex marriage should not be viewed as a therapeutic step for members physically attracted to those of the same sex.

Many gay and lesbian members of the LDS Church have felt that they should marry someone of the opposite sex because of the LDS Church's emphasis on marriage. According to LDS historian Greg Prince, for decades church leaders counseled many men to marry a woman with the promise this would "cure" their homosexuality. He wrote that the overall track record of these mixed-orientation marriages (MOMs) has "generally been dismal, often catastrophic, and sometimes lethal" despite the best intentions.

The church's 2012 website acknowledged by implication that past leaders' advice for individuals attracted to the same-sex to marry someone of the opposite sex may have been erroneous. Leaders have said that homosexual attractions will not continue past death, and that those who don't have an opportunity to be married in this life will in the afterlife. The church teaches that heterosexual marriage is one of several requirements for afterlife entry into the "highest degree of glory" in the celestial kingdom. In 2012 an official church website stated church leaders no longer necessarily advise opposite-sex marriage to those attracted to the same sex.

A 2015 study found that 51% of the 1,612 LGBTQ Mormon respondents who had entered a mixed-orientation marriage ended up divorcing. It further projected that 69% of all these marriages would ultimately end in divorce. The study found that engaging in mixed-orientation marriages and involvement in the LDS Church were correlated with higher rates of depression and a lower quality of life for LGBTQ people.

== Political involvement around LGBTQ rights ==
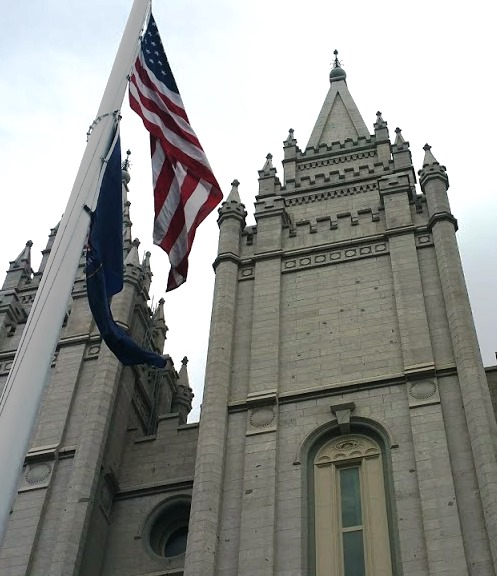
The LDS Church has held notable influence on laws around LGBTQ individuals in the United States, especially in the state of Utah.

The LDS Church has been involved with many pieces of legislation relating to discrimination against LGBTQ people, same-sex sexual activity, and same-sex marriage. For instance, in 1851 under Brigham Young's theocracy over the newly formed Utah Territory in the western US, the church-selected legislature passed a law banning any man from "sexual intercourse with any of the male creation" with penalties left to the courts' discretion.

=== Motivations ===
Church leaders have stated that it will become involved in political matters if it perceives that there is a moral issue at stake and wields considerable influence on a national level. In 1997 then church president Gordon Hinckley declared the church would "do all it can to stop the recognition of same-sex marriage in the United States", and the apostle M. Russell Ballard has said the church is "locked in" if anything interferes with the principle of marriage only being between a man and a woman.

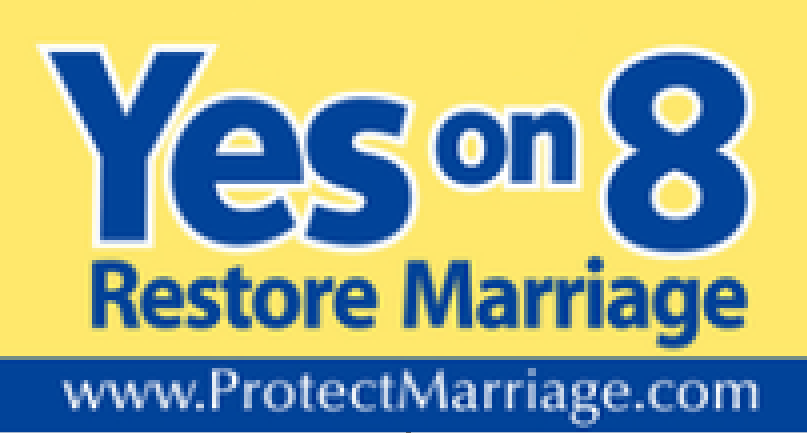
The church distributed hundreds of thousands of these Protect Marriage Coalition lawn signs during their involvement with the pro-Prop 8 campaign.

=== Same-sex marriage ===
Church involvement around same-sex marriage legislation include playing important roles in defeating same-sex marriage legalization in Hawaii (Amendment 2), Alaska (Measure 2), Nebraska (Initiative 416), Nevada (Question 2), California (Prop 22), and Utah (Amendment 3). During Prop 8 church members represented as much as 80 to 90 percent of the early volunteers petitioning voters door-to-door and 50 percent of the campaign funds in support of it. Church leaders are prohibited from employing their authority to perform same-sex marriages, and church property cannot be used for same-sex weddings or receptions. A 2017 Public Religion Research Institute survey found that over half (52%) of Mormon young adults (18–29) supported same-sex marriage while less than a third (32%) of Mormon seniors (65+) did the same.

=== Employment, housing, businesses ===
The church opposes same-sex marriage, but does not object to laws enshrining rights regarding hospitalization and medical care, fair housing and employment rights, or probate rights, as long as churches are exempt from honoring those laws.

A 2017 Public Religion Research Institute survey found that over half (53%) of all Mormon adults believed small private business should be able to deny products and services to gay or lesbian people for religious reasons (compared to 33% of the 40,000+ American adults surveyed), and 24% of all Mormon adults oppose laws that protect LGBTQ Americans against discrimination in employment, housing, and public accommodations.

== LGBTQ Mormon suicides and homelessness ==
=== Suicides ===
In society at large LGBTQ individuals especially youth are at a higher risk of depression, anxiety, and suicide due to minority stress stemming from societal anti-LGBTQ biases and stigma, rejection, and internalized homophobia. Some individuals and organizations have linked church teachings against homosexuality and the treatment of LGBTQ Mormons by other members and leaders as contributing to LGBTQ Mormon suicides. LDS historian Gregory Prince stated that by condemning homosexuality as "evil, self-inflicted, and impossible in postmortal existence" LDS Church leaders have enabled harsh behavior by its members with the alarming number of LDS LGBTQ homeless and Utah's highest per capita teen suicide rate in the country manifesting the effects of this cruelty.

LGBTQ Mormon suicides and experiences with suicidal ideation have received media coverage. In January 2016 the LDS Church mourned over reported suicides of LGBTQ Mormons and stated that leaders and members are taught to "reach out in an active, caring way to all, especially to youth who feel estranged or isolated." The Affirmation website reported over 30 LGBTQ Mormon victims died by suicide between 1971 and 2008 including five gay male BYU students who all died by suicide in 1965.

=== Homelessness ===
In 2013 it was estimated that among the approximately 1000 homeless Utah youths, 30% to 40% were LGBTQ with about half of those coming from LDS homes Another survey showed about 5,000 youth in Utah experience homelessness per year with 60% coming from LDS homes, and over 40% of unhoused Utah youth were LGBT. The Youth Futures Homeless Shelter in the predominantly-LDS city of Ogden, Utah reported in 2015 that over half their often homeless youth clients self-identified as gay or trans. A survey by the Utah Department of Human Services found 48% of gay, lesbian and bisexual teenagers in the state seriously considered suicide in 2021. In the large 2012 survey "Growing Up LGBT in America" over two-thirds of LGBTQ youth in Utah reported not feeling accepted in their community, compared to 42% of LGBTQ youth nationwide, and 3/4 said they would need to leave Utah to feel accepted.

== LGBTQ people at church-owned universities ==
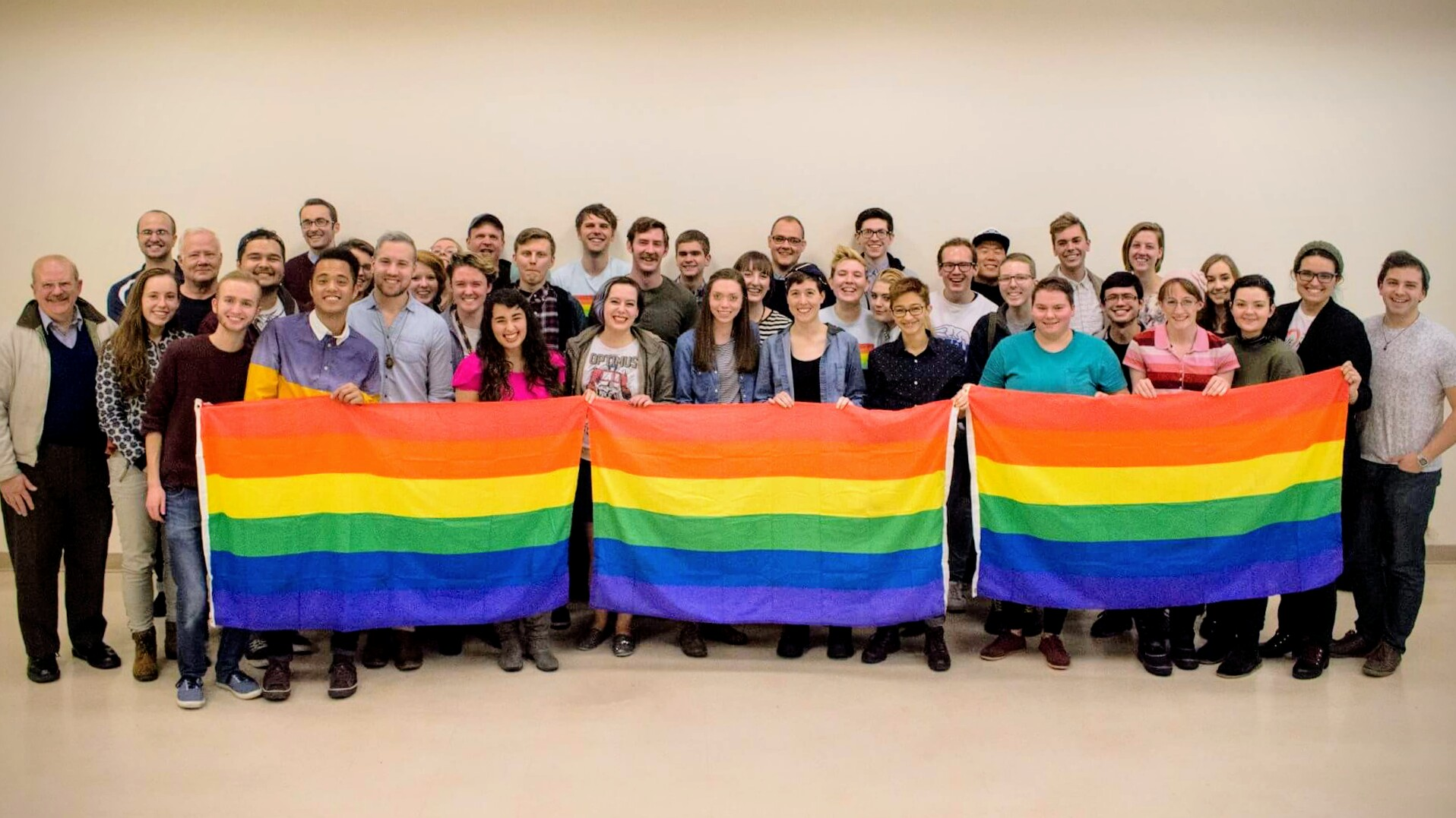
Students at an unofficial LGBTQ BYU organization (USGA) meeting in 2017

LGBTQ students have received media coverage at the three main universities owned by the LDS Church (Brigham Young University (BYU), BYU–Idaho, and BYU–Hawaii). Most media coverage concern the Utah-based BYU university, as it's the largest religious university in North America and is the flagship institution of the LDS Church's educational system. Several LGBTQ rights organizations have criticized BYU's Honor Code as it relates to LGBTQ students and The Princeton Review has regularly ranked BYU among the most LGBT-unfriendly schools in the United States. As of 2017, BYU campus offered no official LGBT-specific resources. Large surveys of over 7,000 BYU students in 2020 and 2017 found that over 13% had marked their sexual orientation as something other than "strictly heterosexual," while the other survey showed that .2% had reported their gender identity as transgender or something other than cisgender male or female.

=== BYU actions and policies ===
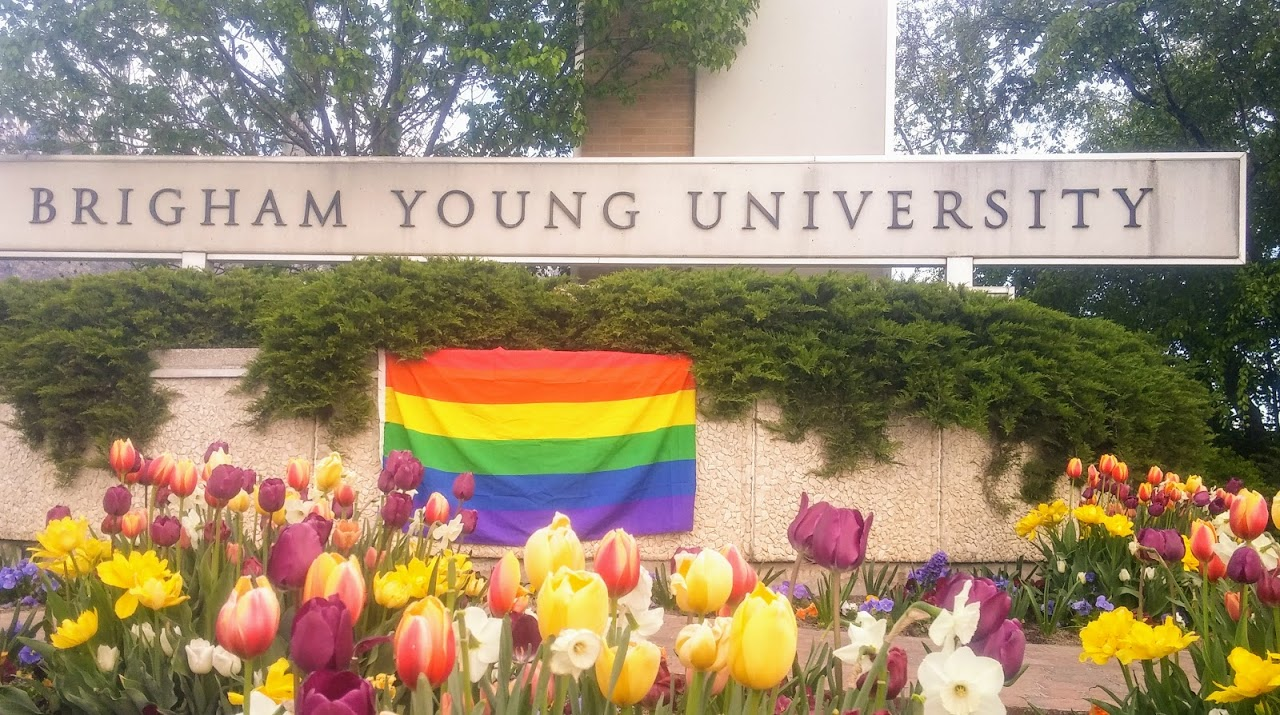
BYU has been ranked as the worst large US university for LGBTQ persons.

BYU has seen many changes in policies around its LGBTQ student population. In 1962 a ban on students known to have a homosexual orientation was enacted by Ernest Wilkinson, but softened a decade later by his successor Dallin H. Oaks to only ban "overt and active homosexuals." From the mid-1960s through the early 1980s BYU police targeted gay people both on and off campus. Under Oaks there was a system of surveillance and searches of student dorms in order to expel students suspected of any same-sex sexual activity. These efforts included stakeouts by BYU security looking for license plates of BYU students at gay bars in Salt Lake City and fake contact advertisements placed in gay publications attempting to ensnare BYU students. In the late 1990s a reference to "homosexual conduct" was added to the BYU Honor Code, and there was a ban on coming out for lesbian, gay, or bisexual students. In 2007, BYU changed the honor code to read that stating one's sexual orientation was not an honor code issue. In February 2020, BYU removed "homosexual behavior" from its Honor Code, but a ban on same-sex romantic behavior such as dating, holding hands, and kissing remains in place as of 2023.

== See also ==
- LGBTQ people and the Community of Christ
- Timeline of LGBTQ Mormon history
- LGBTQ Mormon people and organizations
- Gender minorities and the LDS Church
- BYU LGBTQ history
- Sexuality and Mormonism
- LGBTQ rights in Utah
- List of Christian denominational positions on homosexuality
