= Antonio A. Feliz =

American religious leader

Antonio A. Feliz is the founder and was the first president of the Restoration Church of Jesus Christ, a historical denomination in the Latter Day Saint movement that was founded to serve the spiritual needs of gay, lesbian, bisexual, transgender, and intersex Latter Day Saints.

Prior to the founding of the Restoration Church of Jesus Christ, Feliz was a member of the Church of Jesus Christ of Latter-day Saints (LDS Church). Feliz was a high priest in the church and had served as a bishop and a temple sealer. During the 1970s, Feliz was employed by the LDS Church as the Director of Church Welfare for the Andean Region of the church. In the early 1980s, Feliz was employed at Park College in Parkville, Missouri, which at the time was affiliated with the Reorganized Church of Jesus Christ of Latter Day Saints (now Community of Christ).

On August 23, 1985, Feliz — who had been excommunicated from the LDS Church for his homosexual activities — and five other members of the Los Angeles chapter of Affirmation: Gay and Lesbian Mormons founded the Church of Jesus Christ of All Latter-day Saints, which was later renamed the Restoration Church of Jesus Christ. Feliz served as the first president of the church for only eight months, when he was ousted for making changes to the church without the consent of its members.

Feliz is the author of several books, most dealing with LGBT issues and spirituality. He is one of two founders of GALA (Gay and Lesbian Acceptance), an LGBT support group associated with the Community of Christ, another Latter Day Saint denomination.

== Publications ==
- Antonio A. Feliz (2002). Becoming Open Souls: Transcending Institutional Seduction & Cultural Rape (Concord Press) ISBN 0-929582-01-2
- —— (2007). Elijah's Power: Early Mormon Mysticism & America's Ancient Wisdoms (Concord Press) ISBN 0-929582-03-9
- —— (2000). The Issue is Pluralism: An Urgent Call To Greater Pluralism in Civil Marriage Law (Concord Press) ISBN 0-9703314-0-1
- —— (1992, 2d ed.). Out of the Bishop's Closet: A Cure to Heal Ourselves, Each Other and Our World (Sacramento, Calif.: Alamo Square Press) ISBN 0-9624751-7-3

== See also ==
- Homosexuality and The Church of Jesus Christ of Latter-day Saints
