= Affirmation: LGBTQ Mormons, Families, & Friends =

Organization for LGBTQ+ Mormons

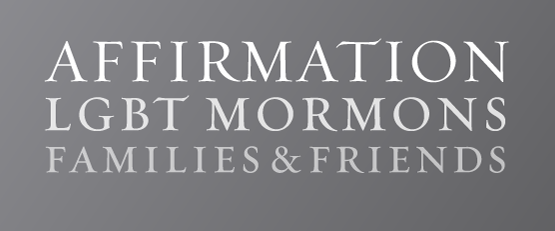
- Founded: June 11, 1977; 49 years ago
- Location: New York City, New York, U.S.
- Region served: Worldwide
- Members: 10,000+
- Volunteers: 30
- Website: affirmation.org
- Formerly called: Affirmation: Gay Mormons United

Affirmation: LGBTQ Mormons, Families, & Friends is an international organization for individuals who identify as gay, lesbian, transgender, bisexual, queer, intersex, or same-sex attracted, and their family members, friends, and church leaders who are members and former members of the Church of Jesus Christ of Latter-day Saints (LDS Church).

== History ==
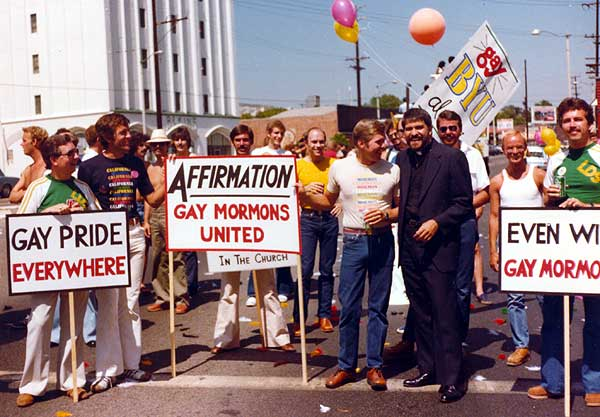
Gay Mormon marchers with Affirmation at the 1979 Los Angeles Pride parade.

=== 1970s ===
Under the name Affirmation: Gay Mormons United, the first Affirmation group was organized on June 11, 1977 in Salt Lake City by Stephan Zakharias (formerly Stephen James Matthew Price) and a group of other Mormon and former-Mormon gays and lesbians at the conference for the Salt Lake Coalition for Human Rights. Stephan organized the group in response to the suicides of two Brigham Young University students who had undergone shock aversion therapy on the campus.

The original organization struggled to survive until 1978, when Paul Mortensen, inspired by an article on the group in The Advocate, formed the Los Angeles chapter. Through the influence of the Los Angeles chapter, Affirmation groups began appearing in many cities around the US.

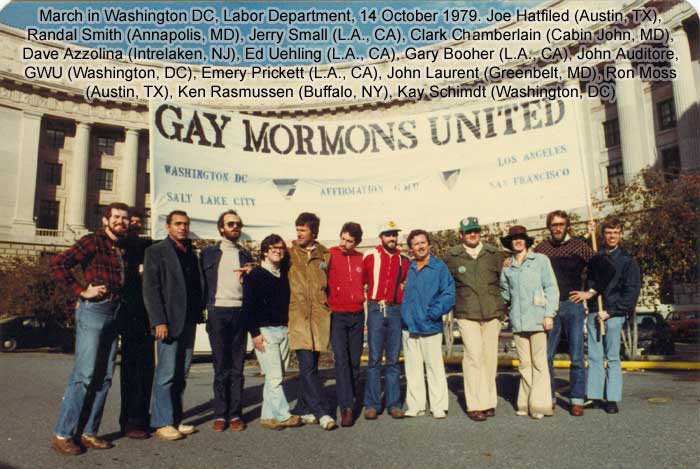
Gay Mormons at the National March on Washington for Lesbian and Gay Rights on 14 October 1979.

Signs saying "BYU alumni" and "Gay Mormon" were held aloft by the Affirmation group at the 1979 Los Angeles Pride Parade in what was called the first out gay Mormon presence at a pride parade. One of the participants was interviewed on camera wearing a BYU jersey.

=== 1980s–1990s ===
Throughout the late 1970s and 1980s, it was a common LDS Church practice to excommunicate individuals who identified as gay, without distinguishing between attraction and behavior.

A book by former LDS Church president Spencer W. Kimball, The Miracle of Forgiveness, counseled individuals with "same-sex attraction" that they could overcome same-sex oriented sexuality through faithful living. Because of the strong emphasis in Mormon theology on marriage of a man and a woman as a requirement for "exaltation" in heaven, it was common for LDS leaders to encourage members who confessed feelings of "same-sex attraction" to ignore their feelings and marry a member of the opposite sex based on the belief that this would overcome homosexuality.

In the 1980s and 1990s, Affirmation increasingly became an organization for ex-Mormons. Members and leaders of Affirmation tended to assume that activity in the LDS Church was psychologically damaging, and believed that the focus of the organization should be on helping people to transition out of Mormonism and to protest policies and doctrines of the LDS Church that were seen as harmful to gay people.

- 1980 – The name was changed to Affirmation: Gay & Lesbian Mormons.
- 1980 – Affirmation leaders sought to engage LDS Church leadership but these early attempts at dialog were rebuffed by LDS Church leadership.
- 1985 – A small number of members of Affirmation formed a Latter Day Saint church for gays and lesbians known as the Restoration Church of Jesus Christ.
- 1998 – In the late 1990s, then-current LDS Church president Gordon B. Hinckley spoke publicly about gay and lesbian issues in a different way than his predecessors, most famously in an interview on Larry King Live. He used the terms "gay and lesbian" and refrained from using harsh rhetoric. He also distinguished between gay or lesbian orientation and behavior, and suggested that gay and lesbian individuals could be members of the church in good standing, so long as they refrained from same-sex sexual activity.

=== 2000s ===
With a softening of the church's positions on homosexuality, increasing numbers of Affirmation members were choosing to stay active in and engaged. In the early 2000s, chapters of Affirmation formed in Mexico and in Chile. With the resurgence in the 2010s, Affirmation began to experience new growth in Latin America, with chapters opening in Argentina, Peru, Colombia and Brazil.

Affirmation quadrupled in active membership. Large numbers of parents and other family members and allies of LGBT individuals began to get involved in the organization. With the participation of entire families, LGBT Mormon teens and youth were a growing segment of the group's membership. Affirmation increasingly took advantage of social media to create community for LGBT Mormons.

- 2004 – Hinckley acknowledged the possibility that sexual orientation could be innate and determined at birth in another interview.
- 2006 – LDS apostle Dallin H. Oaks and member of the Quorum of the Seventy Lance Wickman acknowledged that sexual orientation might not be amenable to change through therapy or personal righteousness, distanced the LDS Church from reparative therapy, and counseled against heterosexual marriage as a "therapeutic step."

=== 2010s ===
- 2011 – Affirmation held its annual international conference in Kirtland, Ohio, an important Mormon historic site, and many Affirmation members experienced the Kirtland conference as a kind of Mormon spiritual "revival."
- 2012 – Randall Thacker was elected president of Affirmation, emphasizing the idea that individuals did not have to choose between being LGBT and Mormon.
- 2012 – In order to better reflect the diversity of the Affirmation community, Affirmation changed its name from Affirmation: Gay & Lesbian Mormons to Affirmation: LGBT Mormons, Families & Friends.

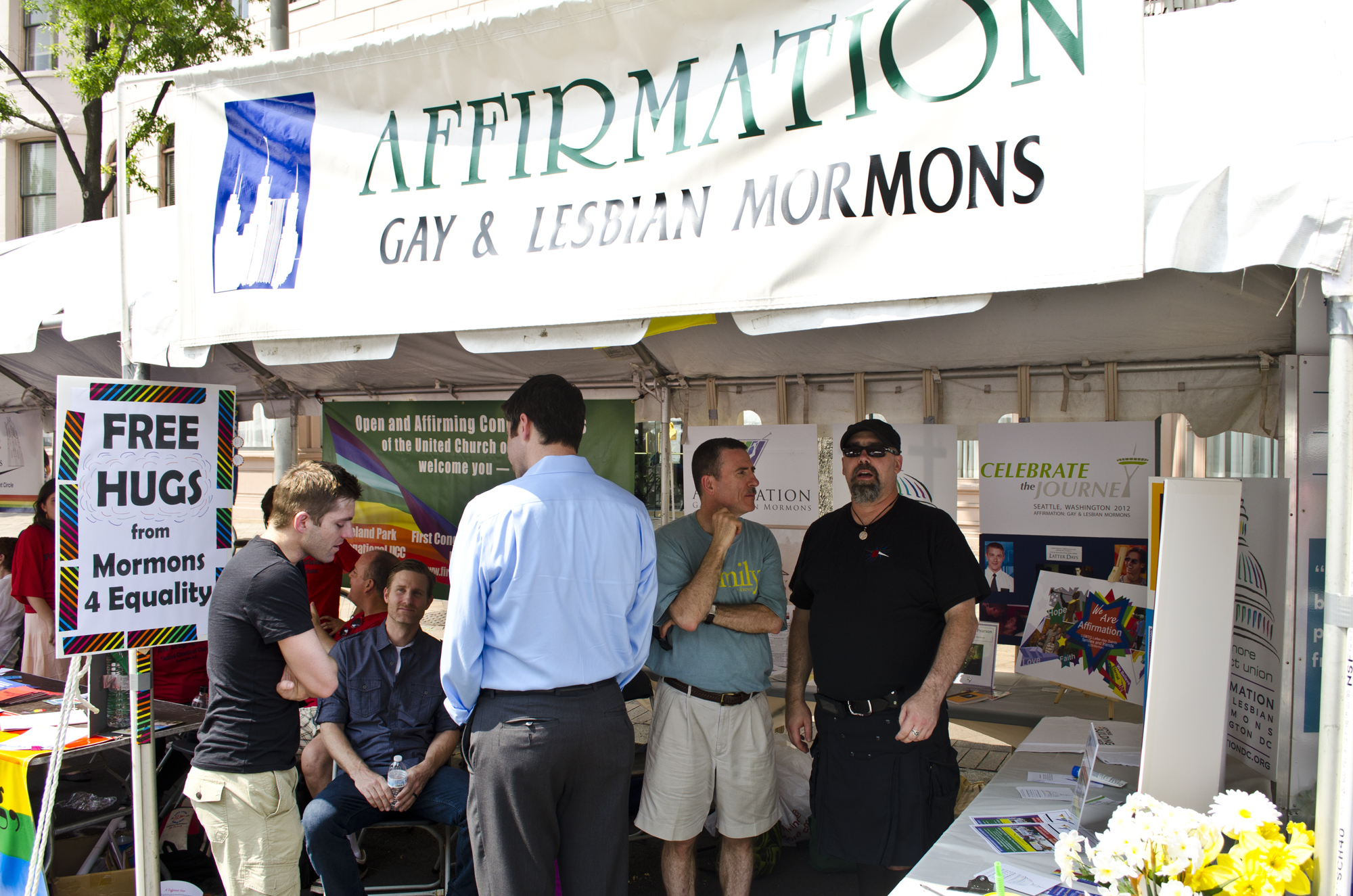
Affirmation booth at the 2013 Washington D.C. Capital Pride street festival.

- 2015 – In response to the legalization of same-sex marriage in the United States, the church modified its Handbook of Instructions in November to define same-sex marriage as "apostasy," and to deny the children of same-sex couples the right to be baptized into the Church unless they moved out of their parents' home and disavowed same-sex marriage. The new policy had a major emotional, spiritual and social impact on members of the Affirmation community, causing many to distance themselves from the church. Many Affirmation members also remained loyal to the church, and continued to stress the founding principles of the group which included working for greater understanding of LGBT issues in the church.
- 2017 – In a Salt Lake Tribune op-ed piece Affirmation president John Gustav-Wrathall stressed the importance of individual agency, and a "big tent" that is inclusive of both current and former Mormons.

== Affirmation and the LDS Church ==
Affirmation is not officially affiliated with the Church of Jesus Christ of Latter-day Saints, remaining an independent non-profit organization that is neither endorsed nor sponsored by the LDS Church.

Some Affirmation members have described the aversion therapy they were persuaded to undergo in the 1960s and 1970s at Brigham Young University, an LDS Church school. Gay students at Brigham Young University in 1977 widely distributed an anonymously published pamphlet called Prologue: An Examination of the Mormon Attitude Towards Homosexuality which described the aversion therapy, persecution of gays, and irregular behavior by the administration and faculty of Brigham Young University such as entrapment by the BYU security forces, recruiting student spies, and recruiting young Mormon women to attempt to sexually convert gays to heterosexuality by encouraging gay men to marry these women in order to "cure" their homosexuality. The pamphlet said a significant percentage of the students at BYU were in fact gay and that psychologists had noted that it seemed that there was a larger percentage of Mormon gays than in any other religion. This pamphlet led directly to the formation of Affirmation in June 1977.

Early in its history, leaders of Affirmation reached out to LDS Church leaders in an attempt to open up a dialog about LGBT issues. Those initial efforts at outreach were rebuffed, and in the four decades of its existence, Affirmation has had a sometimes rocky relationship with the Church. At times, members and leaders of Affirmation saw themselves as having an adversarial relationship with the Church, and members and leaders of the LDS Church perceived Affirmation as an "anti-Mormon" organization, even though the mission, charter and by-laws of Affirmation were focused on providing a community of support that would enable members to reconcile their Mormon faith or heritage with their identity as LGBT.

In October 1999, some Affirmation members in Salt Lake City protested the LDS Church's lobbying and funding of initiatives in California and other states to keep the traditional definition of marriage. Members of the LDS Church and members of Affirmation often found themselves on opposite sides of the political debate over same-sex marriage, when the LDS Church backed a number of political initiatives opposed to same-sex marriage, such as Proposition 22 (in 2000) and Proposition 8 (in 2008, both in California), though LDS Church leaders publicly stated that members of the Church could support same-sex marriage without risk to their membership status, and support for same-sex marriage was never an official part of Affirmation's mission.

In 2005, The Advocate reported that 14% of Affirmation's members had been excommunicated from the LDS church, while 46% of them were still active members of the church. However, only 300 dues-paying members were registered, as the overwhelming majority of those who participated in Affirmation events did not feel they could risk having their names included on membership rolls.

In 2012, leaders of Affirmation opened a dialog with the LDS Church's Public Affairs department. Since a significant portion of Affirmation's growing membership included members of the Church in good standing, Affirmation members were also participating in grassroots dialog events and discussions about LGBT issues and the Church, and have played a role in a continuing evolution of Church members' and leaders' understanding of what homosexuality and transgender are and aren't.

A majority of Affirmation members (based on Affirmation's 2016 survey of their membership) are not active in the LDS Church, and see the Church's political activism against same-sex marriage, its 2015 policy labeling individuals in same-sex marriages as apostate, and its 2016 opposition to statutes protecting transgender rights as signs of hostility to the LGBT community.

== Related organizations ==
GALA (Gay and Lesbian Acceptance), the support group for LGBT members of the Independence, Missouri -based Community of Christ (formerly the Reorganized Church of Jesus Christ of Latter Day Saints), was a break off from the Affirmation Chapter in Kansas City, Missouri, in the mid-1980s.

The decade of the 1990s saw the formation of other gay Mormon organizations, some of which are close allies. Gamofites, an organization for gay Mormon fathers, began in 1991. Family Fellowship, an organization for parents of gay and lesbian Mormons, was formed in 1993. LDS Reconciliation, a group of Gay and Lesbian Mormons that was originally started in conjunction with Family Fellowship, serves a similar purpose but is focused on gay and lesbian Mormons in the Utah and Idaho areas, rather than worldwide as is Affirmation. The first group for gay Mormon youth, Gay LDS Young Adults, was launched in Salt Lake City in 2001.

After the LDS Church's involvement in Prop 8, Mormons for Marriage Equality was formed by straight and LGBT Mormons supporting political campaigns for same-sex marriage equality. After 2012 they rebranded as “Mormons for Equality.” In 2012, a group of Mormons wanting to show support for the LGBT community organized a contingent to march in Utah Pride under the banner of Mormons Building Bridges. MBB now has thousands of members throughout the world, most concentrated in the Intermountain West. Both of these groups, though separate from and unaffiliated with Affirmation, included large numbers of Affirmation members.

== Membership and presence ==
For most of its history, Affirmation functioned through local chapters established mostly in the Pacific Northwest, and in other major American cities such as Portland, Seattle, Los Angeles, New York City and Washington, DC where there were critical masses of Mormons and LGBT people. With the advent of the Internet, many gay and lesbian Mormons began to participate in Affirmation from overseas, especially in Latin America. In 2001 the first non-English chapter was formed in Mexico City, and later chapters appeared in Santiago, Valparaíso, and Puebla. Affirmation chapters also organized in England and Australia in the early 2000s. In 2013, leadership in the U.S. began to support expansion in Latin America and Europe. Currently, in addition to the aforementioned countries, Affirmation has a presence in Ecuador, Peru, Argentina, Paraguay, Brazil, Colombia and in the Caribbean.

An important form of outreach for Affirmation was launched in 1980 with the beginning of the monthly newsletter Affinity. In 1994, Affirmation entered the world of the Internet through on-line bulletin board Q-Saints that evolved into a variety of chat groups and eventually a website, Affirmation.org. Affirmation currently has both Spanish and Portuguese websites as well. After 2012, Affirmation began to engage with LGBT Mormons and their families and friends through social media outlets such as Facebook, YouTube and Twitter in multiple languages. Affirmation began to take advantage of virtual meeting technology to allow its members to talk face-to-face, allowing individual LGBT Mormons in remote locations to network.

At the head of the organization is an executive committee composed of three members. Affirmation is also governed by a board of directors, and a leadership team consisting of international volunteers. Affirmation holds annual national and regional conferences as well in the dozen or so countries where there is an organized presence. In 2017, Affirmation hired its first full-time employees: Spanish- and Portuguese- language webmasters, and an executive director, to support the work of its executive committee, Board and leadership team throughout the world.

== Prominent LGBT Mormons ==
Prominent lesbian, gay, bisexual and transgender Mormons who have been associated with Affirmation include gay activist Leonard Matlovich, artist Trevor Southey, and writer Patrick Califia.

== See also ==
- LGBT Mormon people and organizations
- Homosexuality and The Church of Jesus Christ of Latter-day Saints
- Gender minorities and the LDS church
- Timeline of LGBT Mormon history
- Criticism of Mormonism
- Cultural Mormon
- Gay Liberation
- Law of adoption (Mormonism)
- LGBT-welcoming church programs
- Religion and sexuality
- Restoration Church of Jesus Christ
- United Order Family of Christ
- Same-sex reproduction
