= Restoration Church of Jesus Christ =

Defunct LDS church

- Classification: Restorationist
- Orientation: Latter Day Saint movement
- Scripture: Bible; Book of Mormon (LDS Church); Pearl of Great Price; Doctrine and Covenants (LDS Church); Doctrine and Covenants (Community of Christ); Hidden Treasures and Promises
- Leader: Robert A. McIntier, president
- Founder: Antonio A. Feliz and others (see article)
- Origin: August 23, 1985; Los Angeles, California, United States
- Separated from: The Church of Jesus Christ of Latter-day Saints
- Defunct: 2010
- Congregations: 1 (known as "families" in RCJC)
- Members: 500 (on rolls when denomination dissolved in 2010)

The Restoration Church of Jesus Christ (RCJC), based in Salt Lake City, Utah, was a church in the Latter Day Saint movement that catered primarily to the spiritual needs of LGBTQ Latter Day Saints. It was founded in 1985 and was dissolved 25 years later in 2010.

The RCJC was sometimes informally called the "Gay Mormon Church" because of its overwhelmingly homosexual membership, although people of any sexual orientation could join.

== History ==
The church was founded by Antonio A. Feliz, Lamar Hamilton, John Crane, Pamela J. Calkins and other members of the Los Angeles chapter of Affirmation: Gay & Lesbian Mormons on August 23, 1985, in Los Angeles, California. It was originally named The Restoration Church of Jesus Christ of All Latter-Day Saints or The Church of Jesus Christ of All Latter-Day Saints until the Church of Jesus Christ of Latter-day Saints (LDS Church) reportedly objected that the name was too similar to theirs.

Feliz, a former LDS Church bishop, had been excommunicated from that denomination for homosexual acts. Feliz had also served as the Director of Church Welfare for what was then called the Andean Region (now called the South America West Area) of the LDS Church during the 1970s.

The RCJC had rotating general officers. At a church conference in Sacramento, California, in May 1987, Feliz resigned as president. He was succeeded by Robert McIntier, who served as president of the church from 1987 through 2010, except for a period from 1997 to 1999 when Douglas B. Madrid served as president.

== Scripture ==
The scriptures of the church are the Bible (officially the King James Version, but others are accepted), the Book of Mormon (LDS Church edition), the Doctrine and Covenants (both the LDS Church and the Community of Christ versions, since the RCJC accepts that God can speak to different denominations), the Pearl of Great Price, and The Hidden Treasures and Promises, a book which members say consists of revelations given through the president of the church and other leaders.

=== The Hidden Treasures and Promises ===
The Hidden Treasures and Promises begins with a compilation of the Articles of Faith with insertions for inclusion of women (i.e., "2. We believe that men [and women] will be punished for their own sins, and not for Adam's transgression....5. We believe that a man [or woman] must be called of God, by prophecy, and by the laying on of hands of those who are in authority, to preach the Gospel and administer in the ordinances thereof.") and hymns composed by RCJC member John Crane. The second section of the work (attributed to Antonio Feliz) criticizes the LDS Church for refusing to "send the Restored Gospel to our people—to the gay and lesbian communities of the world." The section calls for the furtherance of the Restored Gospel to the LGBT populace through the "work of ordaining, calling, and setting-apart of missionaries". Altogether, the work consists of 58 sections of messages.

== Beliefs and practices ==
The Restoration Church became the first LDS denomination to ordain women to the priesthood. The Heavenly Mother was regarded as an equal member of the Godhead along with the Heavenly Father, Jesus Christ, and the Holy Ghost. Thus, the church believed in a quadriune Godhead. The Heavenly Parents (i.e., the Heavenly Father and the Heavenly Mother) were worshiped in prayers given in the name of Jesus Christ.

The priesthood leaders of the church were called "general officers" as in the Community of Christ, not general authorities as in the LDS Church. Church conferences were held periodically. Rebaptism was not required for anyone who had been previously baptized in a Latter Day Saint church that can trace its authority back to Joseph Smith. New members who had never previously been a member of a Latter Day Saint church, and those who chose to be rebaptized upon joining the RCJC, were baptized by immersion in the name of The Father, the Son, and the Holy Ghost. When passing the sacrament, either water or grape juice was used.

The Word of Wisdom was regarded as good advice, but not as an absolute requirement. The church counseled that it is best to consume meat in moderation; however, use of alcohol or tobacco by the church membership was discouraged. As in the LDS Church (called the "Orthodox Mormon Church" by the RCJC), it was popular to serve Jell-O, cake, and milk (or fruit punch and cookies) at church gatherings. Members were encouraged to store a one-year supply of food. Home teaching was practiced. The church practiced endowments, the law of adoption, and celestial marriage. In addition to heterosexual marriage, the church also practiced same-sex marriage. The church believed in the practice of baptism for the dead but did not practice it.

== Homosexual polygamy ==
In a 1986 interview with Sunstone magazine, Feliz stated he believed that it was good to practice The Principle (as polygamy is known by modern Mormon fundamentalists) and that he would be open to performing homosexual polygamous marriages if requested by any members.

Pamela J. Calkins, of Sacramento, was the first woman to be ordained to the priesthood in the RCJC. Later, she entered into a polygamous homosexual betrothal sealing in advance of a celestial marriage with three female partners, thus becoming the first women in Mormondom to do so. Calkins and Lynn R. LaMaster were the first lesbian couple to be sealed for time and eternity (celestial marriage). Later that same evening, Leanna R. Anderson and Carole L. Dee were also sealed for time and eternity to each other and to Calkins. No other polygamous homosexual celestial marriages were performed for any other members of the church.

In theory it was conceivable that a heterosexual member of the church (someone who joined the church primarily because of its liberal principles, not primarily because of its compatibility with LGBT people) could ask to be sealed in a heterosexual marriage, but this did not happen.

== Membership ==
During the period 2000–10 the total membership of the church was about 500 on the rolls (of which approximately 25 were active members who attended services at the meetinghouse in Salt Lake City, Utah). The church had one congregation (known as a "family" in the RCJC) in Salt Lake City. There were members on the rolls in many U.S. states (mostly Utah and California), as well as several foreign countries. There was also an online "Internet Sunday School" in which members discussed gospel topics, shared ideas, and offered support to one another.

== See also ==
- Affirmation: Gay & Lesbian Mormons
- GALA (Gay and Lesbian Acceptance)
- David and Jonathan
- Homosexuality and The Church of Jesus Christ of Latter-day Saints
- John the Beloved
- LGBT-affirming churches
- Queer theology
- Secret Gospel of Mark
- Thealogy
- United Order Family of Christ
