= Mama Dragons =

US nonprofit organization

- Founded: 2014; 12 years ago
- Founder: Gina Crivello
- Type: Nonprofit
- Purpose: "Support, educate, and empower mothers of LGBTQ children"
- Headquarters: Utah, United States
- Services: LGBTQ+ support, suicide prevention training, educational programming for parents
- Members: 10,000+
- Executive Director: Liz Welch
- Website: www.mamadragons.org

Mama Dragons is a nonprofit 501(c)(3) organization that supports, educates and reaffirms mothers of LGBTQ children. It provides online guidance to prevent LGBTQ youth suicide, depression, and homelessness as well as to affirm parenting practices for families with religious backgrounds.

Since its founding in 2014, Mama Dragons has grown to include approximately 10,000 members and establish home security for over 20,000 LGBTQ individuals across the United States and 18 other countries. While Mama Dragons originated in Mormonism, the organization is accessible to mothers of all faiths and beliefs. The nonprofit has been labeled as a "faith-based affirming resource" and alternative to conversion therapy by advocacy groups such as Conversion Truth for Families.

== History ==
Mama Dragons formed January 2014 by Gina Crivello, starting as a "small online community of Mormon mothers looking to support one another in their respective journeys with their LGBTQ children".

In November 2015, the Latter Day Church of Christ issued its "Nov 5th Exclusion Policy", which excludes married gays from the Mormon religion. A rise in LGBT suicides after the church announced this policy received media attention. Mama Dragons also garnered media attention for its advocacy and efforts to prevent LGBT Mormon suicides, as well as for bringing a spotlight to the intersection of religion, family, sexual orientation, and gender expression.

In 2017, the organization opened its support group to those outside of the LDS faith.

Mama Dragons became a nonprofit 501(c)(3) in June 2018 and shortened its mission statement to, "We support, educate, and empower mothers of LGBTQ children". In 2019, the organization shifted its focus to all moms of LGBTQ children while maintaining specialized support for mothers from non-affirming religions and cultures. In May 2019, Mama Dragons were featured in Oprah Magazine.

In September 2020, Mama Dragons hired its first Executive Director, Celeste Carolin, a queer businesswoman that had previously been on the Mama Dragons board of directors.

In 2021, Mama Dragons updated its membership policy to allow members to self-identify being a mother or being in a mothering role for admission to their support groups, making space for more diverse gender identity and expression. As of 2022, 5% of Mama Dragon members do not identify with being a cisgender woman.

In 2024, Liz Welch became Executive Director of Mama Dragons. Prior to her appointment, Welch co-facilitated a transgender education and advocacy project and worked at the ACLU, leading a National Faith Coalition to advance LBGTQ+ protections in communities of faith.

== Programs ==
=== Parachute eLearning Program ===
Dr. Jennifer Howell, Mama Dragons Parachute Education Director, created an academic research-based eLearning program called Parachute in July 2021. This program is designed for parents, families, and communities and provides the knowledge, tools, and resources needed to affirm, support, and celebrate LGBTQ children. The first courses focus on the Introduction to understanding your LGBTQ child and are available to all those supporting LGBTQ youth and adults. In May 2022 Mama Dragons launched their Introduction courses in Spanish.

=== QPR Suicide Prevention Training ===
In February 2018 Mama Dragons invested in training Mama Dragons QPR Gate Keeper instructors, a certification program for instructors to teach how to recognize suicidal behaviors and save lives by providing innovative, practical, and proven suicide prevention training. As of 2022 Mama Dragons offers weekly QPR Gate Keeper training to their members.

=== Paper Hugs ===
In September 2018, Lindsay Kinman's child received cards of encouragement from another Mama Dragon member and in turn she reached out to the community to do the same. This inspired Paper Hugs, a card-sending program where Mamas send cards of encouragement to other Mama's kiddos or mamas in crisis. In 2021 Mama Dragons sent 36,000 cards.

=== Wrapped In Hugs ===
In October 2019 a Mama Dragon member saw a quilting article about Shannon Downey using her Instagram community to build quilts and recommended starting a blanket-making program within Mama Dragons. Wrapped in Hugs was inspired by this article and is where Mamas make and send blankets to other Mama Dragons children or mothers in the support group who are in crisis.

=== Peer Led Support Groups ===
Mama Dragons' primary support group is called the Mama Dragons Main Group and provides support for all mothers of LGBTQ children navigating their journey within their family and community. This group is focused on building affirming parenting and is directed toward those that are new to the journey of parenting an LGBTQ child and for more seasoned members and leaders to offer support and education. In this group volunteer admins, moderators, and seasoned Mama Dragons members act as mentors and guides for newer members.

Mama Dragons provides 7 Facebook affinity groups.

1. Mamas of Transgender Children or "T-Mamas" The T-Mamas subgroup was created in response to the need for moms of transgender and non-binary children to have their own space to discuss gender and specific transition-related information.
2. Mamas with Children with Special Needs.
3. Madres Dragones, a Spanish-speaking Mama Dragons support group is a place to discuss the unique intersectionality of raising children who are LGBTQ and Hispanic/Latinx within the context of their primary language.
4. Mamas of Color.
5. Mama Dragons offers three religion-themed support subgroups to provide a space for moms who need support as they navigate the intersection of religion and raising LGBTQ children. Two of these subgroups are for moms with current or former ties to the LDS church and one subgroup is for moms from other religious denominations.
  1. LDS Mamas Tryna Stay - This subgroup is a safe haven for LDS moms to share their experiences and suggestions on how to navigate their relationship with the LDS church while also embracing, supporting, and raising their LGBTQ kids.
  2. Mamas Moving Forward from the LDS Church
  3. Mama's from Religious Roots - This group is a place for other Christian and religious moms to connect and discuss the intersection of faith and all things related to parenting LGBTQ children who need support as they navigate faith and their love for their children.

=== Regional Subgroups ===
Mama Dragons offers 20 Facebook regional subgroups that cover various geographical areas to provide an opportunity for Mama Dragons to connect with members in their local area, share local LGBTQ-friendly resources, and empower one another to fight against local anti-LGBTQ legislation and support pro-LGBTQ actions.

== See also ==
- Gender minorities and the LDS church
- Homosexuality and The Church of Jesus Christ of Latter-day Saints
- LGBT Mormon people and organizations
- LGBT-welcoming church programs
- Timeline of LGBT Mormon history
