= United Order Family of Christ =

Sect of Church of Jesus Christ in Colorado, USA (1966 - 1974)

- Classification: Restorationist
- Orientation: Latter Day Saint movement
- Founder: David-Edward Desmond
- Origin: 1966; Denver, Colorado
- Separated from: The Church of Jesus Christ of Latter-day Saints
- Defunct: ca. 1974
- Official website: rcjc.org

The United Order Family of Christ was a schismatic sect of the Church of Jesus Christ of Latter-day Saints (LDS Church), which was founded in 1966 by David-Edward Desmond, at some point was located in Denver, Colorado, and existed until at least 1973−1974.

The United Order Family of Christ was founded specifically for young gay men only, ages 18 to 30. Because they practiced a uniquely Mormon form of communalism called the United Order in which they held "everything in common", Desmond affirmed that the Family was "not for the great majority of the Gay LDS". Desmond's title as the President of the Church was First Key. He may have solemnized same-sex marriages between people in his congregation.

This Mormon schismatic church was the second gay Christian church founded in the United States, the first being a Catholic schism founded by Father George Hyde in 1946 in Atlanta, Georgia and called the Eucharistic Catholic Church, which later moved to New York City. Desmond's Homosexual Church of Jesus Christ of Latter-day Saints lasted at least until 1973, when Desmond was still corresponding with David C. Martin (then editor of the Restoration Reporter), and probably until 1974.

== David Edward Desmond ==
David E. Desmond was born in 1940 in Spokane, Washington to Wayne Koch and Betty Joyce Grasty, but raised by his maternal grandmother, Lafreda Launer Desmond. He married Sally Jo Hathaway from Costa Mesa, California in the St. George Utah Temple on December 8, 1965, though they presumably separated shortly after. He lived in Denver, Colorado during the 1960s and 1970s. He died on May 11, 1983 in Pullman, Washington. Grace Lutheran Church's Reverend Vernon Johnson held the funeral and he was buried in Fairmount Memorial Park, Spokane, Washington.

== See also ==
- Law of adoption
- LGBT-affirming churches
- Queer theology
- Restoration Church of Jesus Christ
- Secret Gospel of Mark
