= Harmony (organization) =

LGBTQ organization of the Community of Christ

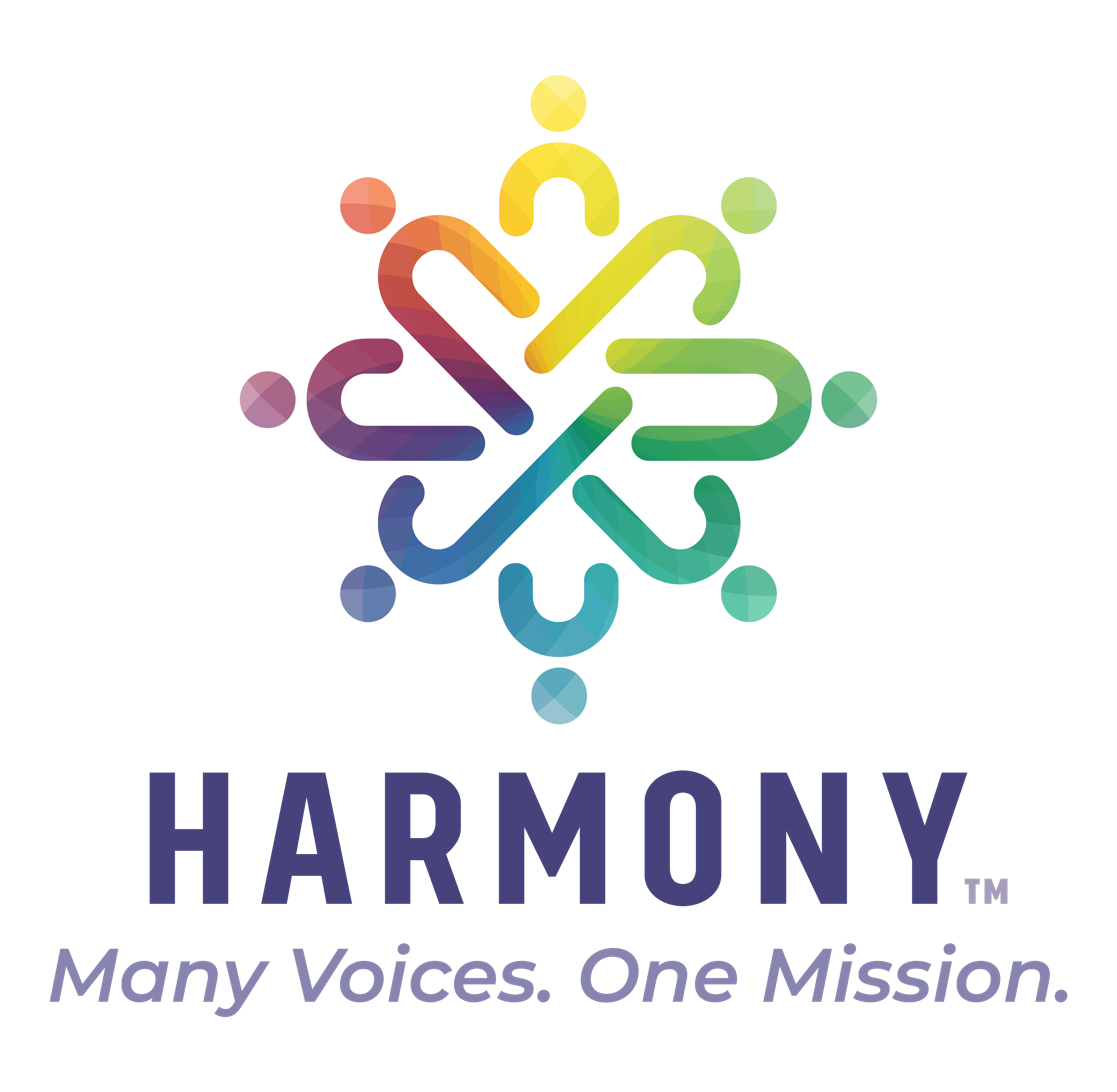
- Classification: Progressive Christianity
- Theology: Latter Day Saint movement
- Associations: Community of Christ
- Region: 3 countries
- Headquarters: Kansas City, Missouri, United States
- Origin: 1982; 44 years ago
- Congregations: 32
- Official website: www.harmony.lgbt

Harmony is an inclusive Latter Day Saint movement churches network. It is affiliated with the Community of Christ.

== History ==
Harmony was founded as Gay and Lesbian Acceptance (GALA) by Bob Swoffer and Antonio Feliz, who had pinned his Park College business card on the public bulletin board of a Kansas City gay bar. Bob Swoffer was the first person to respond to Tony's Park College business card on that gay bar bulletin board in Kansas City, Missouri. Its first gathering was in 1982 at Park College in Antonio Feliz home. Arthur Butler and Ginger Farley were founding members, and Allan Fiscus was the first president of GALA. In 2019, GALA legally merged with the Welcoming Community Network, a non-profit organization serving Community of Christ congregations seeking to become welcoming and affirming, and took the name Harmony.

In 2025, it has 32 churches in 3 countries.

== Beliefs ==
The network supports blessings of same-sex marriage.

== See also ==
- List of Christian denominations affirming LGBTQ people
- Affirmation: LGBTQ Mormons, Families, & Friends
