= List of LGBTQ characters in modern written fiction =

This is a list of LGBTQ characters in modern written fiction. This article covers notable characters who are lesbian, gay, bisexual, transgender or queer, as well as characters who are pansexual, asexual, non-binary and intersex. Characters listed here should have verifiable third-party sources commenting on their sexuality or gender identity, with additional explanation as necessary. Only notable/significant characters from a given work (which may have multiple LGBTQ characters) need to be listed here.

Names are organized alphabetically by surname (i.e. last name), or by single name if the character does not have a surname. If more than two characters are in one entry, the last name of the first character is used.

== Scope ==
A number of different classification schemes have been used to describe sexual orientation and gender identity since the mid-19th century, and scholars have often defined these terms in divergent ways or have failed to define them at all. As such, characters may be described in different ways today than they were historically.

== 19th century ==
Characters	Work	Year	Author	LGBTQ+ identities in story	Notes
Amaro; Aleixo	Bom-Crioulo	1895	Adolfo Caminha	Gay; Bisexual	This story, which takes place in Brazil circa 1870, deals with an interracial same-sex relationship between Amaro, a formerly enslaved black man, and his white partner, Aleixo.
Joseph Asten; Philip Held	Joseph and His Friend: A Story of Pennsylvania	1870	Bayard Taylor	Gay	Joseph and His Friend is considered to be the first gay-themed novel written by an American author.
Carmilla (AKA Millarca and Countess Mircalla Karnstein)	Carmilla	1872	Sheridan Le Fanu	Lesbian	Carmilla, published as part of the book, In a Glass Darkly, is considered the first lesbian vampire story. In this story, Laura, who lives with her father, meets Carmilla, and they form a close relationship, with Laura becoming ill as Carmilla draws nourishment from her.
Jacques Collin a.k.a. Vautrin a.k.a. Trompe-la-Mort	Père Goriot; Illusions perdues Splendeurs et misères des courtisanes	1835; 1837–1843; 1838–1847	Honoré de Balzac	Gay	Appears in a total of five novels of Balzac's La Comédie humaine, two are cameo appearances; often considered the first openly homosexual character in French literature.
Basil Hallward; Dorian Gray	The Picture of Dorian Gray	1890	Oscar Wilde	Gay	In this novel, Basil has a "repressed homosexuality" while Dorian has his own ambivalence, meeting with male prostitutes, even proposing to Sybil Vane in an attempt to suppress his homosexual feelings.
Arthur Ravener; Captain Dillington	A Marriage Below Zero	1889	Alan Dale	Gay	A Marriage Below Zero is considered to be the first English-language gay-themed novel.
Jack Saul	The Sins of the Cities of the Plain	1881	Anonymous	Gay	Jack is a male prostitute for other men, and also crossdresses; Sins is one of the earliest pieces of English-language pornography to explicitly and near-exclusively concern homosexuality.
René Teleny; Camille de Grieux	Teleny, or The Reverse of the Medal	1893	Anonymous; attributed to Oscar Wilde	Gay	Teleny and de Grieux engage in a passionate sexual/romantic affair; Teleny is one of the earliest pieces of English-language pornography to explicitly and near-exclusively concern homosexuality.

== 20th century ==
Characters	Work	Year	Author	LGBTQ+ identities in story	Notes
Francis Abernathy	The Secret History	1992	Donna Tartt	Gay	Francis is later revealed as a "mildly tormented homosexual," the only person who seems to have much of "a sexual existence" and is dressed for the part.
Carol Aird; Therese Belivet; Abby Gerhard	The Price of Salt (a.k.a. Carol)	1952	Patricia Highsmith	Lesbian	A married woman, Carol Aird, meets and falls in love with Therese Belivet, which results in her sexuality being used against her and relinquishing custody of her daughter, while Therese comes out to herself after meeting Carol, while Abby is also a lesbian character. Later made into a 2015 Hollywood film.
Akhenaten; Smenkhkara	A God Against the Gods; Return to Thebes	1976; 1977	Allen Drury	Bisexual	Ancient Egyptian Pharaoh Akhenaten is married to Nefertiti, but his romance with his brother Smenkhkara contributes to his downfall.
Alexander the Great; Hephaistion; Bagoas	Fire from Heaven; The Persian Boy	1969; 1972	Mary Renault	Bisexual; Gay	Alexander the Great is involved in a romantic sexual relationship with Hephaistion, and then the Persian slave Bagoas, but is also married three times and fathers a son.
Brigham Anderson	Advise and Consent	1959	Allen Drury	Bisexual	Married US senator Anderson is blackmailed over a secret wartime homosexual affair for which he is unapologetic.
Vanyel Ashkevron; Stefen	The Last Herald Mage trilogy	1989–1991	Mercedes Lackey	Gay	In the series, Vanyel has two sexual relationships, both with male partners, as confirmed by the author, Mercedes Lackey.
Pete Balkis	The Throne of Saturn	1971	Allen Drury	Gay	Astronaut Pete harbors unrequited romantic feelings for his commander, Conrad Trasker.
Balthamos; Baruch	His Dark Materials	1995–2000	Philip Pullman	Gay	Balthamos and Baruch are old gay men, with their characters poking at existing gay stereotypes in literature, with their relationship growing over the course of the book.
Renly Baratheon; Loras Tyrell	A Song of Ice and Fire	1991–2011	George R. R. Martin	Gay	Never explicitly stated in the novels, but Renly's sexual/romantic relationship with Loras is hinted at, and was later confirmed by author Martin; the TV adaptation makes it clear that they are lovers.
Berdine; Raina	Blood of the Fold; Temple of the Winds	1996; 1997	Terry Goodkind	Lesbian	In these books, the two Mord-Sith are in a relationship with each other. Berdine comes out as a lesbian in the third book of this series and says she loves Raina. This was later turned into a TV series, The Legend of the Seeker.
Frank Berry	The Hotel New Hampshire	1981	John Irving	Gay	
Molly Bolt	Rubyfruit Jungle	1973	Rita Mae Brown	Lesbian	Molly has numerous romantic and sexual relationships with other women. She confronts the "hypocrisies of both heterosexual and homosexual societies."
Beebo Brinker; Beth Ayers/Cullison; Laura Landon	The Beebo Brinker Chronicles	1957–1960	Ann Bannon	Lesbian	These books focus on gay and lesbian love, sexual adventure, with a positive, "yet still complicated look at lesbian relationships," in all five of the books in this series. In the first book, Odd Girl Out, a college girl named Laura gets seduced by Beth, and in the next book, I Am A Woman, Laura goes to a bar and meets a butch lesbian, Beebo Brinker, and talks about coming out to her father. The following book, Women In The Shadows, the relationship between Laura and Beebo continues, while Laura's first girlfriend returns in Journey To A Woman, leading to a "drama-laden lesbian love triangle" of Beebo, Beth, and Laura. The next book, Beebo Brinker looks back to the formative years of Beebo.
Anthony Blanche; Sebastian Flyte	Brideshead Revisited	1945	Evelyn Waugh	Gay	Sebastian is a flamboyant aristocrat, with Charles Ryder having an infatuation with him, with both kissing in the film. At the same time, Anthony Blanche is "openly homosexual, sarcastic and decadent."
Patrick "Kitten" Braden	Breakfast on Pluto	1998	Patrick McCabe	Trans	Braden is an Irish trans woman (and drag queen), with "transvestism...a defiant rejection of bigotry, labels, and borders" as one reviewer put it, with Braden refusing to confirm to sexual stereotypes and even flirting with a cop. Later turned into a motion picture, another reviewer noted the prevalence of the "Irish Troubles", with Kitten wrongly arrested and charged after a "bombing in a London disco."
Dave Brandstetter	Dave Brandstetter Mysteries	1970–1991	Joseph Hansen	Gay	A private investigator, he has been called "one of the few convincing gay (male) characters in crime writing."
Harlan Brown; Billy Sive; Vince Matti; Jacques LaFont	The Front Runner	1974	Patricia Nell Warren	Gay	The book has been called a "gay sports classic," with Harlan Brown described as a homosexual "who longed for romantic love that fully integrated hot sex."
Richard Brown; Louis Waters; Clarissa Vaughan; Sally Seton	The Hours	1998	Michael Cunningham	Gay; Lesbian	In this novel, which has strong parallels with Virginia Woolf's Mrs Dalloway, Clarissa rejects a relationship with Richard, a gay man, for the love of her life, Sally, who is invigorated by this love. Louis is also Richard's former lover, with Richard later taking his own life, while Clarissa comes to a full realization of her own identity.
Kitty Butler	Tipping the Velvet	1998	Sarah Waters	Bisexual	Has a sexual/romantic relationship with the main character and marries a man.
Nancy "Nan" Astley; Florence Banner; Diana Leathaby	Tipping the Velvet	1998	Sarah Waters	Lesbian	Nan has sexual/romantic relationships with Florence and Diana; all three have also been with other women.
Luis Carruthers	American Psycho	1991	Bret Easton Ellis	Gay	Luis is in love with the male protagonist, but later marries Courtney.
M. Charlus; Jupien	Sodom and Gomorrah	1921–1922	Marcel Proust	Gay	This book, which has strong homosexual themes, first coming about in the Combray section of Swann's Way, where the daughter of the piano teacher and composer Vinteuil is seduced, and the narrator observes her having lesbian relations in front of the portrait of her recently deceased father. Critics have often observed that while the character of the narrator is ostensibly heterosexual, Proust intimates that the narrator is a closeted homosexual. There is much debate as to how great a bearing Proust's sexuality has on understanding these aspects of the novel. In response to Gide's criticism that he hid his actual sexuality within his novel, Proust told Gide that "one can say anything so long as one does not say 'I'." In 1949, the critic Justin O'Brien published an article in the PMLA called "Albertine the Ambiguous: Notes on Proust's Transposition of Sexes" which proposed that some female characters are best understood as actually referring to young men. This theory has become known as the "transposition of sexes theory" in Proust criticism, which in turn has been challenged in Epistemology of the Closet (1990) by Eve Kosofsky Sedgwick and in Proust's Lesbianism (1999) by Elisabeth Ladenson.
Claudine; Rézi	Claudine at School	1902	Colette	Bisexual	Claudine is unfaithful to her husband, Renaud, having an affair with her friend Rézi, who herself has a secrete liaison with Renaud.
Clay	Less than Zero; Imperial Bedrooms	1985; 2010	Bret Easton Ellis	Bisexual	This is a coming-of-age story narrated by Clay, "a sexually ambiguous eighteen-year-old student", who tries to resume a relationship with the woman he loved in high school, but "leaves a party with a young man".
Clarissa Dalloway; Doris Kilman	Mrs Dalloway	1925	Virginia Woolf	Lesbian	This novel tells the day in the life of Clarissa Dalloway, a fictional woman in post–war times, and she is strongly attracted to Sally Seton, with both sharing a kiss. Clarissa also recognizes that Septimus dies without revealing his homosexuality, perceiving his failure to speak out as "protecting her private lesbian passion," while Doris later encourages Clarissa to name, at least privately, her "lesbian desires."
Septimus Warren Smith	Mrs Dalloway	1925	Virginia Woolf	Gay	Septimus is haunted by the image of his dear friend Evans, his commanding officer, with implied homosexual relations to them as noted by scholar Jean E. Kennard. [improve source] Septimus later dies in the novel without revealing the secret: that he is gay.
David; Giovanni; Jacques; Guillaume	Giovanni's Room	1956	James Baldwin	Gay	David, a protagonist of the book, escapes death from the guillotine since his "homosexual urges were experimental in nature" while the narrator is cited as a gay character as well.
Nicholas Dawson	City of God: A Novel of the Borgias	1979	Cecelia Holland	Gay	Nicholas has "a penchant for other men", including the gruff but handsome Stefano Baglione, a heterosexual man who has sex with Nicholas for money.
Nicolas de Lenfent	The Vampire Lestat	1985	Anne Rice	Gay	While human, Nicolas shares a romantic sexual relationship with Lestat de Lioncourt.
Lestat de Lioncourt; Louis de Pointe du Lac; Armand; David Talbot	The Vampire Chronicles	1976–2014	Anne Rice	Bisexual	Lestat, Armand and most of Rice's male vampires have intense sexual and emotional attractions and relationships with both sexes.
Edgar Deacon	A Dance to the Music of Time	1951–1975	Anthony Powell	Gay	Powell excavates the secret gay history in his earlier novels in the sequence and in the final volume, Hearing Secret Harmonies, a gay-themed exhibition of Deacon's work is a centerpiece.
Paul Denton	The Rules of Attraction	1987	Bret Easton Ellis	Bisexual	In this book, set in Camden like Ellis's other books, Paul lusts for another character, Sean Bateman, saying he slept with him, while Bateman "never admits as much." This book ended up fortifying Ellis's reputation as a "nihilistic authorial presence who reports action but seldom comments on it."
Albus Dumbledore	Harry Potter series	1997–2007	J. K. Rowling	Gay	Though not stated explicitly in the novels, author Rowling said in various interviews that the character is gay, creating controversy in the process.
Elinor "Lakey" Eastlake	The Group	1954	Mary McCarthy	Lesbian	Elinar is a lesbian and graduate from Vassar College in 1933, with the lives of the stories' protagonists involving the men in their lives. The Baroness is her lesbian lover, which her fellow seven female graduates realize when she returned from Europe. It was later adapted into a film in 1966.
Alluvia (Alice) Fairfax; Stella	Gut Symmetries	1997	Jeanette Winterson	Bisexual	Alice has romantic and sexual relationships with both Stella and Stella's husband Jove.
Lucy Farinelli	Kay Scarpetta novels	1994–2003	Patricia Cornwell	Lesbian	Lucy has romantic relationships and casual sexual encounters with other women. Lucy is not well accepted due to her suspected sexual orientation, has occasionally one-night stands, mostly with women and occasionally with men, but she is seduced by Carrie Grethen, early in her career, a relationship which haunts her and those close to her across several books.
Courtney Farrell; Barry Cabot	Chocolates for Breakfast	1956	Pamela Moore	Bisexual	Courtney develops a crush on her female boarding school teacher, and later has a sexual relationship with Barry Cabot, her mother's bisexual friend who is in a relationship with a man.
Jack Forster	What Happened to Mr. Forster?	1989; 1995	Gary W. Bargar	Gay	A sixth-grade teacher who is fired for being gay.
Simon Foster; Axel Nillson	A Fairly Honourable Defeat	1970	Iris Murdoch	Gay	Simon and Axel are gay characters in this novel.
George	A Single Man	1964	Christopher Isherwood	Gay	George is a gay character who is relatable to everyone.
Gilda	The Gilda Stories	1991	Jewelle Gomez	Lesbian	Composed of six vignettes, this speculative novel follows the heroine across her seven lives in the years of 1850, 1890, 1921, 1955, 1981, 2020, and 2050. The previously unnamed heroine assumes the name Gilda and becomes a vampire in her first life. In those she leads after, her sexuality is explored with numerous women.
Joan Gilling; Esther Greenwood	The Bell Jar	1963	Sylvia Plath	Lesbian	The novel has a central relationship between Joan and Esther, and it addresses the question of socially acceptable identity, examining Esther's "quest to forge her own identity, to be herself rather than what others expect her to be" while highlighting the problems with oppressive patriarchal society in mid-20th century America. There was the 1979 film adaptation of the book, and a lawsuit by Jane V. Anderson, claiming that she was not a lesbian and did not have a relationship with Sylvia Plath.
Jess Goldberg	Stone Butch Blues	1993	Leslie Feinberg	Trans	The narrative follows the life of Jess Goldberg, who grows up in a working class area of upstate New York in the 1940s to the 1950s, and explores her gender identity as a trans woman.
Stephen Gordon; Valérie Seymour	The Well of Loneliness	1928	Radclyffe Hall	Lesbian	This book, a candid novel about "coming to terms with a lesbian identity," was challenged as obscene, under the Obscene Publications Act 1857, for its "frank portrayal of lesbianism." Although the book has no language that is explicitly sexual, the lesbian themes were seen as a threat to the existing social order, seen as unpalatable, remained banned in the UK until 1959 when the Obscene Publications Act was amended. However, it was published in the U.S. in April 1929 when New York State courts agreed that "lesbianism in and of itself was neither obscene nor illegal," meaning the book was not either."
Lord John Grey	Lord John series	1998–2011	Diana Gabaldon	Gay	Lord John has sexual and romantic relationships with various men, though he has had sex with and married women to appease societal expectations of him.
Darvish Shayrif Hakem	The Fire's Stone	1990	Tanya Huff	Bisexual	Darvish is willing to have sex with anyone, whether men or women.
Maurice Hall; Clive Durham; Alec Scudder	Maurice	1913–1914 (1971) (Note: Maurice was written in 1913–14 but not published until 1971, after Forster's death.)	E. M. Forster	Gay	Maurice, Clive, and Alec are gay characters in this novel.
Vladimir Harkonnen	Dune	1965	Frank Herbert	Gay	Harkonnen's sexual preference for men is implied in Dune and Children of Dune (1976), and presented more explicitly in the Prelude to Dune prequel trilogy (1999–2001) by Brian Herbert and Kevin J. Anderson. (Note: Though Harkonnen is the biological father of Lady Jessica, it is noted in Dune that this is because he "once permitted himself to be seduced.")
Bill Haydon	Tinker Tailor Soldier Spy	1974	John le Carré	Bisexual	Has a girlfriend, a male lover, seduces Ann, the wife of George Smiley, and rumoured to be the lover of Jim Prideaux.
Herewiss; Freelorn; The Goddess	The Tale of the Five series	1979–1992	Diane Duane	Bisexual	This book is a fantasy with a "bisexual male protagonist whose main love interest is male", and is set in a world with normalized polyamory, with bisexuality and polyamory seeming to "be the default".
Harold Hutchins	Captain Underpants series	1997–2015	Dav Pilkey	Gay	When the two protagonists Harold and George meet their future selves, Harold's marriage to a man is presented in a matter-of-fact way, which some critics praised.
Jeanette	Oranges Are Not the Only Fruit	1985	Jeanette Winterson	Lesbian	This book is a coming-of-age story about a lesbian girl named Jeanette who grows up in an English Pentecostal community. Key themes of the book include transition from youth to adulthood, complex family relationships, same-sex relationships, and religion. A television adaptation of the book was made and aired by the BBC in 1990, starring Charlotte Coleman and Geraldine McEwan, which won the Prix Italia in 1991.
Sgt. Sean Jennison/Betty	King Rat	1962	James Clavell	Trans	A British POW plays the role of a female in a play, and ultimately starts living as a female full-time.
Kasia	The Career of Nicodemus Dyzma	1932	Tadeusz Dołęga-Mostowicz	Lesbian	Kasia is a lesbian who is having an affair with Kunicki's wife, Nina.
Annie Kenyon; Liza Winthrop	Annie on My Mind	1982	Nancy Garden	Lesbian	This book is a retrospective by Liza, remembering her first semester at MIT, how she met Annie, struggled to recognize her lesbian identity, and they reaffirm their love for each other on the phone at the end of the book. Due to these themes, religious fundamentalists burned a copy of the book, a Kansas superintendent removed it from school libraries, and a lawsuit ensued, with a judge ruling on the side the ACLU, ordering the book to be returned to library shelves. The book is well-regarded as "canonical lesbian-coming-of-age novel."
Keren; Vanyel	Arrows of the Queen	1987	Mercedes Lackey	Lesbian; Gay	Keren, a minor character, is life bonded to Ylsa and then Sherrill. Lackey, in making this book, took a stand, refusing the demand of an editor that Vanyel be "straight, or single, or not in the story," and as such he is a gay character.
Joel Harrison Knox; Randolph	Other Voices, Other Rooms	1948	Truman Capote	Gay	Joel is an "effeminate adolescent," with the narrative showing him have a desire for his cousin, Randolph.
Kochan	Confessions of a Mask	1949	Yukio Mishima	Gay	This novel tells the story of Kochan's childhood and adolescence in imperialistic Japan, where he struggles with his closeted sexuality, masculinity and keeping up his mask of heterosexuality.
Seregil i Korit; Alec i Amasa; Ilar i Sontir	The Nightrunner series	1996–2014	Lynn Flewelling	Bisexual	Seregil and Alec are committed lovers, but both have had experiences with women in the past; Ilar is one of Seregil's former lovers.
Renee LaRoche	Along the Journey River	1996	Carole LaFavor	Lesbian	Originally published in 1996, it is the first detective novel to have "an openly out Indigenous lesbian", the protagonist, Renee.
Lark; Becker	The Beauty of Men	1996	Andrew Holleran	Gay	Lark and Becker are gay characters.
North McAllister; Amos Wilson and Joel	University series	1990–1998	Allen Drury	Gay	North is a "tormented homosexual trying to keep his secret, but recklessly in love"; Amos is protagonist Willie Wilson's gay son, and Joel is Amos' lover.
René Suratt	University series	1990–1998	Allen Drury	Bisexual	René is protagonist Willie Wilson's nemesis, "a bisexual seducer of students".
Dirk McDonald; Duck	Weetzie Bat; Baby Be-Bop	1989; 1995	Francesca Lia Block	Gay	Dirk McDonald and Duck are gay characters in this novel.
Anna Madrigal; Jake Greenleaf	Tales of the City series	1978–2014	Armistead Maupin	Trans	Original character Anna is a transgender woman, and Jake (introduced in 2007's Michael Tolliver Lives) is a trans man.
Michael "Mouse" Tolliver; Jon Fielding; Ben McKenna	Tales of the City series	1978–2014	Armistead Maupin	Gay	Michael is a tolerant gay man, as is Jon and Ben.
Beauchamp Day; DeDe Halcyon Day; Mona Ramsey	Tales of the City series	1978–2014	Armistead Maupin	Bisexual	While the original series featured gay and bisexual characters, in the Netflix adaptation of this series, Shawna is an "explicitly bisexual character."
Anthony Malone; Andrew Sutherland	Dancer from the Dance	1978	Andrew Holleran	Gay	A beautiful and enigmatic man, subsumed by the "gay social curcuit."
Adrian Mellon; Don Hagarty; Phil and Tony Tracker; Eddie Kaspbrak; Richie Tozier	It	1986	Stephen King	Gay	Mellon and Hagarty are openly gay lovers. Mellon was the first of the 1984-85 killings that indicate the return of It. Phil and Tony Tracker are two brothers who are presumed to be gay by Eddie Kaspbrak's mother. Kasprak and Tozier are described as questioning their sexualities as children.
Christopher Metcalfe	Now and Then	1995	William Corlett	Gay	The main character has a sexual/romantic relationship as a boy with another boy at school; later he has sexual and romantic relationships with other men.
Paul Michel; The Protagonist	Hallucinating Foucault	1996	Patricia Duncker	Gay	Openly homosexual writer, said to have many male lovers, including relationship with male main character/narrator.
Luis Molina	Kiss of the Spider Woman	1976	Manuel Puig	Gay	Luis is a gay character in this novel.
Roberta Muldoon	The World According to Garp	1978	John Irving	Trans	One of the story's main characters is Roberta Muldoon, a trans woman and former player for the Philadelphia Eagles who has gender re-assignment surgery. She becomes the bodyguard of Jenny and one of the best friends of Garp.
Mr. Benson	Mr. Benson	1983	John Preston	Gay	Mr. Benson is "a groundbreaking leatherman and S/M Top."
Myron	Myra Breckinridge	1968	Gore Vidal	Trans	Myra Breckinridge is a transgender woman with a fascination for the Golden Age of Hollywood. The novel is the first written whose protagonist has undergone sexual reassignment surgery. Myra is more or less bisexual in that she pursues sexual relations with men and women.
Hélène Noris; Tamara Soulerr	The Illusionist (Le rempart des Béguines)	1951	Françoise Mallet-Joris	Bisexual	Tamara has a romantic relationship with both Hélène and her father; Hélène prefers men after the affair ends.
Jeff O'Brien; Lloyd Griffith; David Javitz; Eduardo; Henry Weiner; Luke West	The Men from the Boys; Where the Boys Are; Men Who Love Men	1997; 2003; 2007	William J. Mann	Gay	Jeff is a gay character whose sexual identity is explored outside the confines of a relationship and what it means to "set boundaries for yourself and your partner."
Laurie Odell; Ralph Lanyon; Andrew	The Charioteer	1953	Mary Renault	Gay	Laurie, Ralph, and Andrew are gay characters in this novel.
Gabriel Okimasis	Kiss of the Fur Queen	1998	Tomson Highway	Gay	The story slowly begins to focus on Gabriel's sexuality and when he confronts this new identity, he descends into "promiscuity and prostitution with constant flashbacks of the abuse he suffered at the hands of the priests."
Orlando Marmaduke Bonthrop Shelmerdine	Orlando: A Biography	1928	Virginia Woolf	Trans	The titular character lives for over 300 years as both a man and a woman, before marrying a non-binary captain near the end of the novel. In addition to a semi-permanent metamorphosis from man to woman, Orlando frequently chooses to present as one gender or another by intentionally changing attire, hairstyle and/or speech.
Patrick	The Perks of Being a Wallflower	1999	Stephen Chbosky	Gay	Has a secret relationship with the closeted Brad.
Margaret Prior; Selina Dawes	Affinity	1999	Sarah Waters	Lesbian	Margaret, also called "Peggy" and "Aurora", is an unmarried woman from an upper-class family, becomes a visitor at the prison, and meets Selina, but she is a prisoner in her life, "dictated by gender rules and societal expectations, as Selina is in her physical cell." This novel is set in a women's prison in London, explores the "Victorian world of spiritualism," and won the Somerset Maugham Award for Lesbian and Gay Fiction. Like her first novel, Affinity contains overarching lesbian themes, and was acclaimed by critics on its publication, and later turned into a feature film.
Pyrrhus; Philoctetes	An Arrow's Flight	1998	Mark Merlis	Gay	Pyrrhus, the 21-year-old son of Achilles, and Philoctetes, who has a magic bow, are gay characters.
Reggie Dick	The Leather Boys	1961	Gillian Freeman	Bisexual; Gay	Tells the story of a gay relationship between two young working-class London men, Reggie and Pete, one married and the other a biker.
Scratch, Winc	Nearly Roadkill	1996	Kate Bornstein and Caitlin Sullivan	Trans	Scratch and Winc are two lovers with ambiguous gender identity, with the plot is told through cyberchats and emails between each other, while the FBI is engaged in a nationwide manhunt to find them.
Danny Slocum	The Confessions of Danny Slocum	1980	George Whitmore	Gay	Danny is the titular character, a gay athlete gay men, and is "sexually broken."
Milo Sturgis	Alex Delaware series	1985–2017	Jonathan Kellerman	Gay	Milo is a gay character.
The Narrator	Written on the Body	1992	Jeanette Winterson	Ambiguous	Narrator of unspecified gender who has sexual/romantic relationships with men and women. Some reviewers describe the narrator as a lesbian.
Imogene "Idgie" Threadgoode; Ruth Jamison	Fried Green Tomatoes at the Whistle Stop Cafe	1987	Fannie Flagg	Lesbian; Bisexual	A friendship blossoms between Evelyn Couch, a middle-aged housewife, and Ninny Threadgoode, an elderly woman who lives in a nursing home, while her sister-in-law, Idgie, and her friend, Ruth, run a café. Idgie has a long-term romantic relationship with another woman. At the same time, Ruth is married to a man and bears his child, but subsequently has long-term romantic relationship with another woman. Although it is not explicitly labeled as a lesbian relationship, every resident both knows about and accepts Idgie and Ruth's relationship, making lesbianism a theme in the novel, while in the film adaptation, a story of Southern female friendship and love, Ruth had been in love with Buddy Threadgoode, Idgie's brother.
Aud Torvingen	The Blue Place	1998	Nicola Griffith	Lesbian	Aud Torvingen, an 18-year-old coming to the U.S., who is the daughter of a rich diplomat, rents an apartment near Atlanta, and becomes an Atlanta cop, but falls into passionate encounters. One of these encounters is with Julia. She remains a protagonist in the book's two sequels,Stay and Always, and becomes "one of the most human and intriguing lesbians in crime fiction."
Arnold Turner; Ewing Baird; Wayne	The Wrong People	1967	Robin Maugham	Gay	The novel follows Arnold Turner, a repressed English schoolmaster on holiday in Tangier, who gives in to his long-suppressed homosexual desires and subsequently becomes embroiled in a dangerous sex trafficking scheme devised by a wealthy and manipulative American expatriate, Ewing Baird.
Jack Twist; Ennis del Mar	"Brokeback Mountain" (short story)	1997	Annie Proulx	Gay	Jack and Ennis have a long term sexual and romantic relationship despite both being married to women and fathering children. Jack also has sexual relationships with other men and a woman, while Ennis does not. Critics have described both men as gay or, variably, Jack as bisexual and Ennis as heterosexual.
Jaret Tyler; Peggy Danziger	Happy Endings Are All Alike	1978	Sandra Scoppettone	Lesbian	This young adult book is the first one with a "clearly lesbian main character," named Jaret Taylor who comes out in the book's first line: "Even though Jaret Tyler had no guilt or shame about her love affair with Peggy Danziger she knew there were plenty of people in this world who would put it down." Jaret, a future lawyer, endures hardship and discrimination but remains strong even as Peggy, her girlfriend, "wavers in the face of family and small-town prejudices." Scoppettone would go on to write a popular mystery novel series featuring a lesbian detective named Lauren Laurano.
Raymond Tyler, Jr. Basil Henderson	Invisible Life; Just As I Am; Abide With Me; Any Way the Wind Blows	1991; 1995; 1999; 2001	E. Lynn Harris	Bisexual	Raymond is torn between his girlfriend Nicole and his married male lover; Basil leaves his fiancée Yancey at the altar and pursues a gay lifestyle.
Dr. Ethan Urquhart	Ethan of Athos	1986	Lois McMaster Bujold	Gay	Obstetrician Ethan is from a future society on the planet Ethos where male homosexuality is the norm and most inhabitants have never even seen a woman in person.
Clodagh Unwin; Alice Meadows	A Village Affair	1989	Joanna Trollope	Lesbian; Bisexual	In this story, Alice Meadows questions her identity, having an affair with a lesbian woman named Clodagh Unwin, while she remains married, with her awakening depending on "a heart-wrenching choice between her lover and her family."
Villanelle	The Passion	1987	Jeanette Winterson	Bisexual	In this book, Villanelle is an androgynous and bisexual daughter of a boatman from Venice who crosses paths with Henri, who also has an "ambivalent sexuality."
Wes	The Arizona Kid	1988	Ron Koertge	Gay	Wes is a gay character.
Patience White; Sarah Dowling	Patience and Sarah	1969	Isabel Miller	Lesbian	This book, which captures "Lesbian-feminist consciousness" in the U.S. in the 1960s, is not only a love story of Patience and Sarah but also became important in the "lesbian literary-political tradition," with Miller's experience as a woman and lesbian shaping the book itself.
Jim Willard; Ronald Shaw; Paul Sullivan	The City and the Pillar	1946	Gore Vidal	Gay	Jim, Ronald, and Paul are gay characters in this novel.
X Andrew; Joe	Boy Culture	1995	Matthew Rettenmund	Gay	X (narrator's pseudonym) has sexual and romantic relationships with Andrew, Joe and other men.

== 21st century ==
Characters	Work	Year	Author	LGBTQ+ identities in story	Notes
Aisling "Ash"; Kaisa	Ash	2009	Malinda Lo	Lesbian	This story tells the classic Cinderella story, but Ash falls in love with a beautiful woman, rather than a prince, named Kaisa, who saves her "from her oppressive new existence." The twist to this story is described by some as important, especially for "those looking for a girl romance."
Apollo; Piper McLean; Hemithea; Josephine; Lavina Asimov; Poison Oak	The Trials of Apollo series	2016–2020	Rick Riordan	Bisexual; Lesbian	Apollo was the god of the Sun, archery, healing, and prophecy and is bisexual. Piper initially dated Jason Grace, a male, but near the end of the series was found kissing a girl by Apollo, proving that she is bisexual. Hemethea and Josephine left the Hunters of Artemis to pursue a romantic relationship with one another and are the current caretakers of the Waystation. Lavina is a Roman demigod at Camp Jupiter who is a lesbian, and she ends up with the tree nymph poison oak.
Chuck Bass	Gossip Girl	2002–2011	Cecily von Ziegesar	Bisexual	In this series, Chuck was bisexual, although this was never explored in the Gossip Girl TV show, which creator Joshua Safran said he regretted.
Darla / "Chardonnay"	Final Destination: Looks Could Kill	2005	Nancy A. Collins	Lesbian	
Tori Beaugrand	Quicksilver	2013	R. J. Anderson	Asexual	Tori, an engineer, hacker, and friend, is asexual, an important part of her life, as she mediates on an attempt to have a sexual relationship. Her friend Milo wants their relationship to be sexual but he respects the sexual orientation of Tori. In a post on Livejournal, the author explained how Tori being asexual "adds a layer of complication and delicacy to her relationships with her parents and her best (male) friend," Milo, while explaining some of her choices.
Ben	The Darkest Part of the Forest	2015	Holly Black	Gay	Ben is a gay brother of the book protagonist, Hazel, and he also loves the sleeping prince.
Sadie Kane Walt Stone; Anubis	The Serpent's Shadow (The Kane Chronicles)	2012	Rick Riordan	Polyamorous	Sadie had crushes on both Walt and Anubis who also liked her. In The Serpent's Shadow they merge bodies but still keep separate thoughts. Both Walt and Anubis are still aware of everything around them so when Sadie starts dating, she is essentially in a polyamorous relationship.
Elizabeth Bennett; Caroline Bingley; Charlotte Lucas	Gay Pride and Prejudice	2012	Kate Christie	Lesbian	In this story, which takes the original text of Pride and Prejudice, tweaking it and rewriting passages to "queer-up the story," Caroline Bingley has a crush on Elizabeth Bennett, while Charlotte Lucas never thinks “highly either of men or matrimony."
Goran Beviin; Medrit Vasur	Star Wars: Legacy of the Force series	2006–2008	Karen Traviss	Gay	Married couple from the Star Wars Legends continuity, although it was subtle enough that some fans did not pick up on this, misinterpreting it, because they not explicitly noted as gay. Traviss, in a post on her website, described them as a gay couple in a same-sex marriage, saying it was important for Star Wars to have "its first gay characters," writing that these characters are gay as a detail rather than a major plot point because it is just a normal part of their lives.
Brandon; Angel	Freakboy	2013	Kristin Elizabeth Clark	Trans	The protagonists of the story, Angel and Brandon, are struggling to find their identity and where they fit in.
Cade; Dylan	The Love Interest	2017	Cale Dietrich	Gay	Caden is gay, while Dylan is either gay or bisexual.
Calixte; Tzara; Thyon Nero; Ruza	Strange the Dreamer series	2017–2018	Laini Taylor	Lesbian; Bisexual; Gay	Calixte and Tzara enter a long-term lesbian relationship with each other at the start of the series, while Thyon Nero has never been romantically or sexually attracted to a woman, but finds himself drawn to Ruza, who seems to reciprocate his interest, making them both gay or in Ruza's case at least bisexual.
Jason Carrillo; Kyle Meeks; Nelson Glassman	Rainbow Boys	2001	Alex Sánchez	Gay	Kyle is infatuated with Jason, a popular boy at the school, and Kyle establishes a Gay-Straight Alliance at the school, while Jason realizes he likes Kyle, even as Nelson is attracted to Kyle, his best friend.
Riley Cavanaugh	Symptoms of Being Human	2016	Jeff Garvin	Genderfluid	Riley is the daughter of a prominent Southern Californian politician, navigates being genderfluid "and experiencing panic attacks," while running a blog, and even Andie Gingham, a trans girl, reaches out to her for advice.
Emily Christina	Being Emily	2012	Rachel Gold	Trans	Never comfortable with being seen as a boy, they originally hide themselves as a girl, until they can no longer stand it anymore, with a psychologist later helping them in the coming-out process.
Alice Chu; Selwyn Kane; Greer Taylor; Victoria Morgan; Sarah; William	Legendborn	2020	Tracy Deonn	Lesbian; Bisexual; Nonbinary; Gay	Alice, the best friend of the protagonist Bree, is a lesbian. Selwyn, one of Bree's love interests, previously had a crush on Nick, another of Bree's love interests, and has had sexual relationships with both men and women. Greer, Bree's friend, is nonbinary and uses they/them pronouns. Victoria is bisexual as she once had a one-night stand with Selwyn but is now dating Sarah, who is a lesbian. William, another of Bree's friends, mentions that he has a boyfriend.
Clariel	Clariel	2014	Garth Nix	Asexual, aromantic	The protagonist "stands out for her assured asexuality" as she does not see the appeal of sex, wanting to live alone in the woods as a forest ranger. But at her current age her parents try to push her to marry a man who is the son of "an unpleasant political ally."
Cooper Clay; Kris Greene; Mikhail Powers	One of Us Is Lying	2017	Karen M. McManus	Gay	Cooper was a promising baseball star who was accused of steroid use by one of Simon Kelleher's post, but it was later revealed that the original post was edited. This post revealed that he was gay and in a relation with Kris Greene. Later, Mikhail shows anger about it, since he is also gay and was forced out of the closet, as Bronwyn Rojas remembers.
Click	Roving Pack	2012	Sassafras Lowrey	Trans	This is a story of "transgender gutterpunks" as one reviewer calls it, with Click, and the other young protagonists fighting for "the right to have a future, and, furthermore, the future they themselves choose." This story focuses on youth near Portland, many of which are parentless, homeless, and "without mooring."
Mia Corvere; Ashlinn Järnheim	Godsgrave (The Nevernight Chronicle series)	2017	Jay Kristoff	Bisexual; Lesbian	Mia Corvere, is an infamous assassin and fugitive slave, is fleeing from the Blades of the Red Church and Luminatii legion, with her family wanting her to die and her mentor in hands of her foes. She works with many individuals, like her lover, Ashlinn, to find out the "final answer to the riddle of her life."
Fever Crumb	Fever Crumb Series	2009–2011	Philip Reeve	Bisexual	Fever first falls in love with the male Arlo Thursday, and later with the female Cluny Morvish.
Anne Damer	Life Mask	2004	Emma Donoghue	Lesbian	This book is set in late 18th century London, telling the story of three women caught in a love triangle, one of whom is Anna, whose "lesbian side" is not realized until the end of the book.
Ambassador Dannyl; Tayend of Tremmelin	The Black Magician trilogy	2001–2003	Trudi Canavan	Gay	Dannyl has relationship with his assistant, Tayend of Tremmelin, who is referred to in the novel as a "lad."
David/Daniela	The Adventures of Tulip, Birthday Wish Fairy	2012	S. Bear Bergman and Suzy Malik	Trans	David is granted a wish by the story's protagonist, Tulip, to live as a girl named Daniela.
David/Kate, Leo	The Art of Being Normal	2015	Lisa Williamson	Trans	David is a 14-year-old kid who struggles with their gender identity which most of his fellow students do not understand, and neither do his parents, becomes isolated until he meets Leo Denton, who becomes one of his fast friends.
Nico di Angelo; Will Solace	Camp Half-Blood Chronicles	2013–2023	Rick Riordan; Mark Oshiro (The Sun and the Star)	Gay; Bisexual	Nico is gay, and Will is bisexual as revealed in The Sun and the Star. They become a couple in between The Heroes of Olympus and The Trials of Apollo with The Sun and the Star revealing the history of their relationship and exploring it more. Nico is also revealed to have had a crush on Percy Jackson and was previously extremely closeted. In turn, Will is depicted as having a crush on the goddess Persephone.
William Day	Where the Dead Wait	2023	Ally Wilkes	Gay	William Day is a closet gay in love with Jesse Stevens during two expeditions to the Arctic.
Ella	Just Girls	2014	Rachel Gold	Trans	Ella is a fully-transitioned, but closeted, trans woman who deals with a lot of transphobia while she explores her gender identity with a cisgender lesbian named Jess Tucker.
Emily	The Butterfly and the Flame	2005	Dana De Young	Trans	This book focuses on Emily, a trans girl in her teens, who is in a relationship with a boy, the son of the person who owns the farm their family lives on.
Emras	Banner of the Damned	2013	Sherwood Smith	Asexual	In this book, there are a variety of sexual orientations, with Emras choosing to be asexual. Despite the problematic element that she can decide her own sexual orientation, she realizes that this "choice" is actually a "way of being."
Tamar Kir-Bataar Tolya Kir-Bataar; Jesper Fahey; Wylan Van Eck; Nina Zenik; Hanne Brum	Grishaverse	2012–2021	Leigh Bardugo	Lesbian; Bisexual; Gay; Asexual; Pansexual; Trans	Tamar is lesbian and married to a woman, Nadia Zhabin. Tolya is asexual - when asked about his lovers, he says he isn't interested. Jesper is bisexual, and Wylan is gay; they begin dating each other by the end of the duology. Nina has also been confirmed to be pansexual. Hanne is trans, expressing unhappiness about their female body and feeling more comfortable when ending up in a man's body.
Alex Fierro; Magnus Chase	Magnus Chase and the Hammer of Thor	2016	Rick Riordan	Genderfluid; Pansexual	Alex is Magnus Chase's love interest. She is genderfluid and identifies as either a girl or a boy depending on the present moment, changing pronouns as appropriate. She goes by she/he pronouns, but has specified she uses she/her unless she says otherwise. Magnus' crush on her regardless of gender means that he is most likely pansexual, but also possibly polysexual or bisexual.
Gabe (Elizabeth)	Beautiful Music for Ugly Children	2012	Kirstin Cronn-Mills	Trans	A DJ and lover of music, he hides his true identity as a trans boy in public, only being himself (Gabe) on air. He is forcibly outed, dealing with much backlash, but is supported en masse by his listeners.
Joanna "Jo" Gordon; Mary Carlson	Georgia Peaches and Other Forbidden Fruit	2016	Jayde Robin Brown	Lesbian	In this sweet teen romance, Joanna, an "evangelical lesbian in a small Southern town," and Mary meet each other, as Joanna struggles to figure out her identity, but never considers it sinful. Even though Joanna and Mary are White, "the rest of their friends display considerable diversity," with one reviewer hoping it will help people "bridge the gap between faith and sexuality."
Will Grayson (Note: The novel features two protagonists named Will Grayson, one written by Green and one by Levithan; it is Levithan's Will Grayson who is referred to here.); Tiny Cooper	Will Grayson, Will Grayson	2010	John Green; David Levithan	Gay	One of the book's co-prostagonists, named Will Grayson is gay and is "struggling with coming out," while the other is a major character in a "one-man gay-freedom-day band named Tiny Cooper."
Basilton Grimm-Pitch; Simon Snow	Carry On	2015	Rainbow Rowell	Gay; Bisexual	Basilton and Simon are in a romantic relationship, in this book which borrows themes from Harry Potter, with Simon as bisexual and Basilton as gay, with some reviewers saying the book engaged in bisexual erasure.
Nick Guest; Wani Ouradi; Leo Charles	The Line of Beauty	2004	Alan Hollinghurst	Gay	Nick is a graduate of Oxford University who has a love affair with a council worker before he falls in love "with a cocaine-addicted millionaire."
Rosemary Harper; Sissix	The Long Way to a Small, Angry Planet	2015	Becky Chambers	Lesbian; Bisexual	Rosemary Harper and Sissix are both either lesbian or bisexual as the two women enter a relationship with each other over the course of the novel. In her review, Casey Stepaniuk describes the book as "like Star Trek but with lesbians and more aliens."
Sage Hendrix	Almost Perfect	2009	Brian Katcher	Trans	This story follows the relationship between Sage, a trans girl in her teens, and Logan, a straight man, who becomes more accepting and supportive of them.
Scott Hunter; Christopher "Kip" Grady; Shane Hollander; Ilya Rozanov; Ryan Price; Fabian Salah; Eric Bennett; Kyle Swift; Troy Barrett; Harris Drover	Game Changers series	2018–2027	Rachel Reid	Gay; Bisexual	A romance novel series set in the same universe, it follows six queer NHL players. Scott falls in love with barista Kip; Shane and Ilya are league rivals who hide their relationship for a decade; Ryan, teammates with Ilya and Troy at different points, falls in love with his childhood crush, musician Fabian; Scott's teammate Eric falls in love with Kip's friend Kyle; Ilya's new teammate Troy falls in love with his and Ilya's team's social media manager Harris.
Ijeoma; Amina	Under the Udala Trees	2015	Chinelo Okparanta	Lesbian	Ijeoma and Amina fall in love with each other as children and keep loving each other way into adulthood.
Wilma Irrling	Die Wilden Hühner und die Liebe	2003	Cornelia Funke	Lesbian	Wilma is one of the five main characters. She falls in love with Leonie, a girl from her theatre group and eventually comes out to her friends.
J	I Am J	2011	Cris Beam	Trans	J, who lives with his parents in a Manhattan apartment, and struggles with his gender identity.
Jackdaw	I Am Princess X	2015	Cherie Priest	Gay	
Jackson	Call Me Home: A Novel	2015	Megan Kruse	Gay	
Jared; Nathan	The Rest of Us Just Live Here	2015	Patrick Ness	Gay; Bisexual	Jared is gay, while Nathan is either bisexual or gay. They start seeing each other over the course of the novel.
Holland Jeager; Cece	Keeping You a Secret	2003	Julie Anne Peters	Lesbian	In this coming out novel, Holland is intrigued by a student transferring to her school who "wants to start a Lesbigay club at school." In the process, Holland faces homophobia, and begins a relationship with Cece, adjusting to her new sexuality quickly.
Griffin Jennings; Theo McIntyre; Jackson; Wade	History is All You Left Me	2017	Adam Silvera		Griffin is a gay teenager dealing with OCD and the recent loss of his ex-boyfriend, Theo. He then meets Theo's current boyfriend (before he died), Jackson. In the end of the book, Griffin and Wade are dating.
Jo; Lara	Ukiah Oregon series	2001–2004	Wen Spencer	Lesbian	In this series of books, Jo and Lara are the mothers of Ukiah Oregon, the story's protagonist. In the first book, Alien Taste, it is revealed that Ukriah was raised first by wolves, then by Jo and Lara. Jo and Lara also appear in the three other books in the series, Tainted Trail, Bitter Waters, and Dog Warrior, but only as minor characters.
Josh	Holding Still For As Long As Possible	2009	Zoe Whittall	Trans	Josh is a trans man and EMT who struggles with his identity.
Jude; Willem; JB; Caleb	A Little Life	2015	Hanya Yanagihara	Gay; Bisexual	JB and Caleb are gay. Willem is bisexual and has had relationships with women prior to his relationship with Jude. Jude is implicitly stated to be asexual, given that he does not enjoy engaging in sexual activities and does not understand the appeal of sex, even when he is in a healthy relationship with Willem.
Suruga Kanbaru	Monogatari Series	2006–present	Nisio Isin	Lesbian	Kanbaru's first arc in Bakemonogatari revolves around her unrequited love for Hitagi Senjougahara.
Vincent Katherinessen; Michelangelo Kusanagi-Jones; Claude Singapore; Maiju Montevideo	Carnival	2006	Elizabeth Bear	Lesbian; Gay	This story revolves around two spies sent to steal alien tech from Amazonia, a "planet ruled by man-enslaving lesbians" like Claude and Maiju. Additionally, the two spies, Vincent and Michelangelo are homosexuals from a world with "regressive and repressive mores."
Grady (Angela) Katz-McNair	Parrotfish	2011	Ellen Wittlinger	Trans	Angela, a teenage trans girl, transitions from a man to a woman, deals with a bully who wants to humiliate her, and struggles with her new identity.
Kevin	Guardian of the Dead	2011	Karen Healey	Asexual	Although he is not the protagonist, Kevin is a key part of the book, and he comes out as asexual to his friend, and the book's heroine, Ellie Spencer. This conversation is handled delicately, with Ellie offering support to Kevin when remembering how her sister, a lesbian, has a tough time trying to tell her parents. Unfortunately, as one reviewer puts it, he does not explore his asexual identity much after this point.
Renarin Kholin; Shallan Davar; Jasnah Kholin; Ral-Na	The Stormlight Archive series	2010–present	Brandon Sanderson	Gay; Bisexual; Asexual; Trans	Renarin is gay, and is implied to be attracted towards Rlain, a non-human male character. The author has stated that this will be explored further in later entries of the series. Shallan is Bisexual, although this is barely explored in the text. Jasnah is asexual and heteroromantic, with a neutral opinion towards physical intimacy. Ral-Na is a minor character who initially appears as a woman but is later shown having changed his body into a male one using magic.
Daja Kisubo; Rizuka fa Dalach "Rizu"; Lark	The Will of the Empress	2005	Tamora Pierce	Lesbian	Daja is the main character who begins a relationship with Rizu, while Lark (a more minor character) is in a long-term lesbian relationship. In this story, the relationship between Daja and Rizu ends sadly, making the point you should choose your chosen family over "a partner who's not good enough for you."
Denise Lambert	The Corrections	2001	Jonathan Franzen	Bisexual	In this novel, Denise begins affairs with both her boss and his wife, and though the restaurant is successful, she is fired when this is discovered.
August Landry; Biyu "Jane" Su; Niko Rivera; Isaiah; Wes	One Last Stop	2021	Casey McQuiston	Bisexual; Lesbian; Transgender; Gay	August is bisexual and Biyu, who goes by the name of Jane throughout this sapphic romance, is described as a "punk butch lesbian." They quickly become each other's love interests, with August mulling over her feelings towards Biyu throughout the novel. Niko is a transgender man. He is dating Myla. Isaiah and Wes, who are revealed to have been pining for each other, are gay.
Alec Lightwood; Magnus Bane; Raphael Santiago; Lily Chen; Helen Blackthorn; Aline Penhallow; Kieran; Mark Blackthorn; Michael Wayland; Diana Wrayburn; Woolsey Scott; Anna Lightwood; Ariadne Bridgestock; Charles Fairchild; Alastair Carstairs; Thomas Lightwood; Matthew Fairchild; Hypatia Vex; Claude Kellington; Kit Rook; Ty Blackthorn	The Shadowhunter Chronicles	2007–present	Cassandra Clare	Lesbian; Gay; Bisexual; Transgender; Asexual; Pansexual; Genderqueer	Alec is gay and Aline is a lesbian, and they are two of the first openly homosexual Shadowhunters. Alec eventually marries his longtime boyfriend Magnus Bane, a bisexual warlock who has had many relationships with both men and women. Raphael, Magnus's close friend, was confirmed to be asexual and aromantic by Cassandra Clare. Lily, Raphael's second in command, is pansexual and secretly in love with Raphael, although this does not stop her from having flings with Anna Lightwood and Helen Blackthorn. Helen, Aline's wife, her younger brother Mark and his ex-boyfriend Kieran are all bisexual and of faerie descent, with Clare describing faeries as, "being, in general, bisexual". Michael, the parabatai of Alec's father Robert, was a closeted bisexual who developed feelings for Robert but later married Eliza Rosewain. Diana is the series's first openly transgender character. Woolsey, one of Magnus's ex-lovers, was gay. Anna, a distant relative of Alec, was a genderqueer lesbian who despite her womanizing nature has never been able to move on from her first love Ariadne Bridgestock, who is a closeted lesbian. Ariadne enters a lavender engagement with Charles, a closeted gay man, to hide her own homosexuality even though Charles is in love with Alastair, another closeted gay man. Alastair later develops feelings for Anna's gay cousin Thomas Lightwood, who reciprocates his feelings. Matthew, Charles's younger brother, is bisexual. Hypatia, one of Anna's ex-lovers, is bisexual. Claude is bisexual and has had sexual relationships with both Matthew and Hypatia. While it is yet to be confirmed that Kit and Ty are queer it is heavily implied that the two have romantic feelings towards one another, with Kit most likely being bisexual (as he is of faerie descent and seems to also display attraction to women) and Ty most likely being gay (as he only shows attraction to Kit).
Ronan Lynch; Adam Parrish; Kavinsky	The Raven Cycle	2012–2016	Maggie Stiefvater	Bisexual	Adam shows a romantic interest in the female protagonist during the first two books, but then develops a relationship with Ronan Lynch.
Rhy Maresh; Alucard Emery	Shades of Magic trilogy	2015–2017	V.E. Schwab	Gay; Bisexual	Rhy is bisexual prince while Alucard is gay. They had a fling three years prior the events of the books. Victoria Schwab actually stated multiple times that in her eyes none of the characters are straight, but that is not mentioned in the series. Lila has also been described a genderfluid pickpocket.
Maxine	Maxine Wore Black	2014	Nora Olsen	Trans	Maxine is a lesbian trans girl who is a high school dropout and a babysitter, and cannot afford gender reassignment surgery, while in a romance with a cisgender woman.
Melissa	George	2015	Alex Gino	Trans	Melissa is a transgender girl whom the world sees as a boy named George.
Aristotle Mendoza; Dante Quintana	Aristotle and Dante Discover the Secrets of the Universe /Aristotle and Dante Dive into the Waters of the World	2012	Benjamin Alire Sáenz	Gay	Early in the novel Dante reveals he's attracted to boys and as the novel progresses, falls in love with his best friend Aristotle. At the end, Aristotle accepts his own love for Dante and they begin a relationship. In the sequel, both Aristotle and Dante explicitly identify as gay while in the first book, aside from being in love with Dante, Aristotle's exact sexuality was never specified.
Russel Middlebrook; Min Wei	Geography Club	2003	Brent Hartinger	Gay; Bisexual	Russel is a gay man, while Min is a bisexual character in this novel.
Henry "Monty" Montague; Felicity Montague; Percy	The Gentleman's Guide to Vice and Virtue	2017	Mackenzi Lee	Bisexual; Asexual	Henry Montague is bisexual and has romantic feelings towards Percy. His sister Felicity is asexual.
Mordred; Lancelot	Mordred, Bastard Son	2006	Douglas Clegg	Gay	Sympathetic Mordred and an exiled Lancelot fall into a romance.
Jonathan Morgan	All the White Spaces	2022	Ally Wilkes	Trans	A trans man who joins an expedition to Antarctica in 1920.
Moff Delian Mors	Star Wars: Lords of the Sith	2015	Paul S. Kemp	Lesbian	Mors, the first LGBT character in the Star Wars canon, was introduced in this book, (Note: There were same-gender relationships in “Star Wars: The Old Republic” online roleplaying game after an outcry, introduced in 2015.) is an Imperial officer who makes mistakes, is very capable, and happens to be a lesbian as well, with those who included it saying that Star Wars should be diverse, apart from stories about "straight, white males". Reviewers for the New York Daily News stated that while her sexuality is not a major concern in the novel, suggesting that "homophobia isn't an issue in the Empire," and something that the Imperial Army does not worry about, even as they fight the Rebels.
Nancy; Kade	Every Heart a Doorway	2016	Seanan McGuire	Asexual; Trans	Kade is a classmate of Nancy, who has an asexual crush on them.
Newt	The Maze Runner (book series)	2009-2016	James Dashner	Gay	In the maze runner, they have to escape the maze, and try not to die from a deadly virus. In the movie adaptation Newt was played by Thomas Brodie-Sangster.
Izumu Niounomiya	Zaregoto Series, Ningen Series	2002–2005, 2004–2010 (respectively)	Nisio Isin	Trans	Izumu and his sister Rizumu work as a team of professional killers.
Phèdre nó Delaunay; Moirin	Kushiel's Legacy series	2001–2011	Jacqueline Carey	Bisexual	Phèdre and Moirin are bisexual characters in this novel.
Jeff O'Brien; Lloyd Griffith	Where the Boys Are	2003	William J. Mann	Gay	Jeff and Lloy are gay men in this novel.
Nora O’Malley	The Girls I've Been	2020	Tess Sharpe	Bisexual	Nora is a con artist who is caught in a bank robbery with her ex-boyfriend and girlfriend.
Luna (Liam) O'Neill	Luna	2004	Julie Anne Peters	Trans	The story follows the life of Luna, who keeps her trans identity secret originally, pretending to be an average 16-year-old senior boy named Liam in the daytime. Later she considers transitioning and fights for her right to be the person she feels that she was meant to be, helped by her sister, Regan, in the process.
Oshima	Kafka on the Shore	2002	Haruki Murakami	Trans; Gay	Oshima is a 21-year-old intellectual gay trans man who is a librarian and owner of a cabin in the mountains near Komura Memorial Library. He becomes the mentor of Kafka as he guides him to the answers that he's seeking on his journey.
Benji Ovich	Beartown series	2017–2018	Fredrik Backman	Gay	Benji is a gay hockey player who "has an awakening".
Paul, Noah, Tony; Kyle "Infinite Darlene"/Daryl Heisenberg	Boy Meets Boy	2003	David Levithan	Gay	Paul and Noah are in love with each other and Tony is also gay; Paul's ex, Kyle, is bisexual and Daryl/Darlene is a cross-dresser.
Patroclus; Achilles	The Song of Achilles	2011	Madeline Miller	Gay; Bisexual	Achilles is gay, showing no interest in girls. Patroclus is bisexual, saying he would fall in love with Briseis if not for Achilles.
Emi Price; Ava	Everything Leads to You	2015	Nina LaCour	Lesbian	In this novel, Emi Price finds a letter written to a recently dead film icon, leading them to Ava, his granddaughter, who Emi is smitten with, and hopes for "new love with Ava."
Millie Quint; Flora Baird	Her Royal Highness	2019	Rachel Hawkins	Bisexual; Lesbian	The story centers on the developing romantic relationship between Millie and Flora.
Reese Ames/Amy	Detransition, Baby	2021	Torrey Peters	Trans	Reese is a trans woman who has relationships with both men and women, significantly Amy. Through flashbacks, the book shows Amy (originally James) living as a trans woman, while presenting as Ames in the present after detransitioning. Ames still considers himself a trans woman after his official detransition, which he did because of the threat of violence and hardships from living as a trans woman. In both the past and present, Ames is shown dating women.
Richie	The Slap	2008	Christos Tsiolkas	Gay	Male main character who has a sexual attraction to Hector.
Sal	Mask of Shadows duology	2017–2018	Linsey Miller	Genderfluid	Sal is genderfluid and signals by that day's clothing whether they want to be called "he", "she", or "they".
Lisbeth Salander	Millennium series	2005–2007	Stieg Larsson	Bisexual	Lisbeth has gender ambiguity, specifically "a mix of attributes within her identity as a woman" and she has various bisexual "relationships, sex with friends in non-exclusive relationships, recreational sex."
Arthur Seuss; Ben Alejo	What If It's Us Series	2018; 2021	Adam Silvera and Becky Albertalli	Gay	The two main characters are teenage boys in a relationship, who later reconnect as adults.
Shori	Fledgling	2005	Octavia Butler	Bisexual	The novel tells the story of Shori, a 53-year-old member of the Ina species, who appears to be a 10-year-old African-American girl, biting a construction worker named Wright because she finds his scent irresistible, and they begin their relationship.
Jerico Soberanis	The Toll (Arc of a Scythe trilogy)	2019	Neal Shusterman	Genderfluid	Jerico is a "hypercompetent, genderfluid sea captain" who is given space to shine in the novel.
Aaron Soto	More Happy Than Not	2015	Adam Silvera	Gay	Aaron Soto is a sixteen-year-old dealing with his father's suicide, his own recent suicide attempt, and his growing feelings for a boy and accepting his sexuality despite having a girlfriend and seemingly homophobic friends. He tries to "forget" that he's gay by suppressing his memories through a procedure at Leteo.
Simon Spier; Bram Greenfeld; Cal Price; Peter; Carter Addison; Leah Burke; Abby Suso; Cassie Peskin-Suso; Mina Choi; Nadine Suso; Patty Peskin; Julian Perillo	Simon vs. the Homo Sapiens Agenda	2015	Becky Albertalli	Gay; Lesbian; Pansexual	There are multiple LGBTQ+ characters in this story. For instance, Simon is a closeted gay teenager in love with his pen pal 'Blue', who is also a closeted gay teenager. Simon later discovers that Blue is his classmate Bram Greenfeld and the two start dating. Cal is Simon's bisexual classmate who initially shows an interest in Simon, but later dates Simon's younger sister Nora. Peter is an older guy who flirts with Simon at a gay bar and Carter is the gay older brother of Simon's classmate Martin. Leah and Abby, two of Simon's best friends, are both bisexual but do not come out until the sequel novel Leah on the Offbeat, when they start dating each other. Cassie, Abby's cousin and a major character in the novel The Upside of Unrequited, is a lesbian and Mina is her pansexual girlfriend. Cassie also has two mothers, Nadine, who is a lesbian, and Patty, who is bisexual. Julian, a former crush of Cassie's twin sister Molly, is gay and dating Carter Addison.
April Spink; Miriam Forcible	Coraline	2002	Neil Gaiman	Lesbian	April, a retired burlesque dancer who may know about magic and fairies, and another retired burlesque actress, Miriam, are lovers. On multiple occasions, Neil Gaiman, who wrote the novel the movie is based on, stated that they are an elderly couple and are together, relating to the many lesbians he put in his other works like Sandman, Death: The Time of Your Life, Neverwhere, American Gods, and Miracleman. He also confirmed that this was reflected in the movie, noting a review on the movie adaptation in 2009, stating that they had been called "thespians" in a Coraline musical in 2007, and stated that he did not call them a couple in the text because he wanted readers to have the same experience he had "with the couple that Spink and Forcible were based on."
Dana Stevens	Trans-Sister Radio	2000	Chris Bohjalian	Trans	Dana, the protagonist of this book, is a Vermont professor who is prepared to have a gender reassignment surgery to transition from male to female, leading Allison Banks, a teacher who has been divorced, to be even more attracted to Dana.
Corny Stone; Luis	Modern Faerie Tales trilogy (Tithe, Valiant, Ironside)	2002–2007	Holly Black	Gay	In this story, there are a number of LGBTQ+ characters. For one, Corny Stone is the gay brother of the childhood friend of the story's protagonist, Kaye Fierch, who tries to straddle the Faerie and human worlds. Luis is also gay, which the author confirmed, and has a relationship with Corny. Reportedly, in Valiant: A Modern Tale of Faerie, Ruth is Val's lesbian best friend.
Sundew; Willow; Umber; Anemone; Tamarin	Wings of Fire	2012–present	Tui T. Sutherland	Lesbian Gay	Sundew and Willow are in a lesbian relationship together. Umber is gay and had a romantic attraction to Qibli, another male character. Anemone and Tamarin are in a lesbian relationship as well.
Noah Sweetwine; Brian Connelly	I'll Give You the Sun	2014	Jandy Nelson	Gay	Noah is shown to be gay from the beginning, and later starts a relationship with Brian who is also gay.
Taako Taaco; Lup Taaco; Kravitz; Hurley; Sloane	The Adventure Zone graphic novel series	2018–present	Carey Pietsch	Gay; Lesbian; Trans	Taako is one of the three main characters, and canonically a gay man. In the books it has not yet been explicitly been stated, but in The Adventure Zone Podcast, he is confirmed to have a gay relationship. The third graphic novel, Petals to the Metal, features two secondary female characters named Hurley and Sloane who have a relationship/feelings for each other. The Hurley-Sloane lesbian couple survived to the end of the story, surviving a near-death experience, while Taako got a boyfriend (the Grim Reaper, known as Kravitz) and Lup, Taako's sister, is a trans woman.
Tamaru	1Q84	2009–2010	Haruki Murakami	Gay	Tamaru is a gay character.
Mike Tate	Whatever: or how junior year became totally f$@ked	2016	S.J. Goslee	Bisexual	Mike has a girlfriend who breaks up with him and he becomes close with a "classmate who used to torment him."
Ryan Thomson	The Sidekicks	2016–2017	Will Kostakis	Gay	Ryan is a gay man in this "super gay book" and is set at an "all-boys, sports-centric school."
Tommy; Ozzie; Calvin	At the Edge of the Universe	2017	Shaun David Hutchinson	Gay	Ozzie had a long-term relationship with Tommy before he vanished. Calvin is gay.
Mateo Torrez; Rufus Emeterio	They Both Die at the End	2017	Adam Silvera	Gay; Bisexual	Although Mateo's sexuality is never outwardly discussed in the book, he is presumed to be gay. Towards the end of the book he kisses Rufus, who is a bisexual teenager.
Danny Tozer/Dreadnought; Sarah Callisto/Calamity; Kinetiq	Nemesis series(Dreadnought, Sovereign)	2017	April Daniels	Trans; Lesbian; Bisexual; Genderqueer	Danny is a transgender lesbian who, when given the powers of the world's greatest superhero, also gained the feminine body she wanted. Calamity is a bisexual graycape(masked vigilante in contrast with professional hero). Kinetiq is a genderqueer Iranian-American superhero who had been working upstream for a couple years prior to the story.
Sue Trinder; Maud Lilly	Fingersmith	2002	Sarah Waters	Lesbian	Sue and Maud have a sexual/romantic relationship with each other.
Andrej "Tschick" Tschichatschow	Why We Took the Car	2010	Wolfgang Herrndorf	Gay	Tschick reveals his homosexuality to the main character Maik after they went on a roadtrip to Romania. To hide his homosexuality, Tschick took on a personality that he thought was very "male".
Various	The Collection: Short Fiction from the Transgender Vanguard (anthology)	2012	Tom Léger and Riley MacLeod (editors)	Trans	This book brings together 28 stories which focus on the experiences of trans people.
Various	A Safe Girl to Love	2014	Casey Plett	Trans	The story's protagonists, and many other unnamed characters, are all trans women, but this detail is not the main factor in their connections between each other, as they work to determine what paths are ahead for themselves in their lives.
Sinjir Rath Velus	Star Wars: Aftermath; Star Wars: Aftermath: Life Debt; Star Wars: Aftermath: Empire's End	2015–2017	Chuck Wendig	Gay	Sinjir Rath Velus is a gay imperial officer, raising the question of what life "is like for gay men and women in the Empire."
Seth Wearing; Gudmund	More Than This	2013	Patrick Ness	Gay; Bisexual	Seth is gay and secretly dated Gudmund until they got outed. Gudmund appears to be bisexual or in denial of his homosexuality.
Jude Winter; Dallas; Stevie	Jude Saves the World	2023	Ronnie Riley	Non-binary/Bisexual; Gay; Lesbian	Jude is a twelve-year old middle-school student who has chosen this name to replace their deadname. Jude has two school friends: Dallas comes out to Jude as being gay while Stevie has a crush on another girl but feels she must hide her feelings. The book sparked political backlash in Texas in 2025.
Felicity Worthington	Gemma Doyle Trilogy	2003–2007	Libba Bray	Lesbian	Felicity is an "alpha girl", who becomes friends with the protagonist, Gemma, and has an "obsession with power", and has a tortured lesbian relationship with Pippa. Felicity is revealed to be either bisexual or a lesbian (although most likely lesbian as she seemed to use men as a cover-up) in the last book when she shares a passionate kiss with Pippa, before leaving the corrupt Pippa behind forever.

== See also ==
- Bisexual literature
- Gay literature
- Lesbian literature
- Transgender literature
