= The First to Die at the End =

2022 young adult novel by Adam Silvera

- Book cover
- Author: Adam Silvera
- Language: English
- Genre: Young Adult • Drama
- Publisher: HarperCollins
- Publication date: October 4, 2022
- Publication place: United States
- Media type: Print (hardcover and paperback), e-book, audiobook
- Pages: 560
- ISBN: 9780063240803

The First to Die at the End is a young adult novel written by American author Adam Silvera and published on October 4, 2022, by HarperCollins. It focuses on two young adults, Valentino and Orion, who meet when Valentino discovers the controversial new company Death-Cast has announced he is fated to die that day. It is a prequel to Silvera's They Both Die at the End.

== Plot summary ==
Orion Pagan and his adopted sister Dalma attend the Times Square-based inaugural ceremony for Death-Cast, a company that claims to predict the deaths of individuals. Model Valentino Prince moves from Arizona to New York City, his twin sister Scarlett planning to join him the following day. He then goes to Times Square and meets Orion. Orion tells Valentino about his heart condition and his past; his parents died in the 9/11 attacks, after which Orion was adopted by his friend's family. Orion advises Valentino to sign up for Death-Cast, and Valentino does.

At midnight, Valentino receives the Death-Cast alert from founder Joaquin Rosa, informing him that he is a Decker and will die in the next twenty-four hours. A shooter barely misses Valentino, and Orion has a heart attack. Valentino and Dalma rush him to the hospital, where Orion recovers. Orion tells Valentino about how he is on a wait list for a new heart, but it could be a long time before he gets one. Valentino offers Orion his heart, and they discover that they are a match. Valentino calls Scarlett to tell her he's dying. Meanwhile, Joaquin Rosa learns that several people signed up for Death-Cast but won't get the alert, and he decides to keep it secret for now.

Frankie Dario, a struggling photographer and Valentino's landlord, intends to photograph Deckers dying. His wife Gloria's friend Rolando Rubio works at Death-Cast, so Frankie calls him to get the names of Deckers, but Rolando does answer. Valentino and Orion go to Valentino's apartment, where Valentino reveals to Orion that his parents rejected him when he came out as gay, and that he hasn't told his parents he's dying. Valentino had previously scheduled a photo shoot at a modeling agency, and the two decide to go to it, though Valentino will never see the results. Meanwhile, Scarlett discovers the pilot of her plane is a Decker.

Rolando finally calls Frankie back, and reluctantly agrees to help him. He tells Frankie the name of a Decker: Valentino Prince. Valentino and Orion go to the photo shoot, where Valentino's agent tells them the photo shoot has been delayed for two days. Valentino tells her that he's a Decker, but she doesn't believe in the validity of Death-Cast. At the same time, Scarlett is forced to find another flight after the pilot dies while they are still grounded. Meanwhile, Orion goes to Ground Zero with Valentino and decides to be strong for his parents. Orion takes Valentino to Brooklyn Bridge, where they kiss and decide to go to Times Square for their first date.

Joaquin Rosa informs the public that there is still one Decker who doesn't know they'll be dying, and says that this will never happen again. When Orion and Valentino get to Times Square, Dalma calls Orion to tell him what Joaquin Rosa said. Scarlett calls Valentino to tell him that the airline has grounded all their flights, and there's nothing Scarlett can do to get there on Valentino's End Day.

Rolando, Gloria, and Gloria and Frankie's son Paz go out to eat, and Rolando tells Gloria that he hopes she will divorce Frankie for her and Paz's safety. At around the same time, Valentino and Orion go to Orion's house, where Valentino calls his parents and tells them he's dying. When they refuse to speak to him, Valentino hangs up. Valentino and Orion go back to Valentino's apartment, where Valentino records a goodbye video for Scarlett to watch when she gets to New York.

Gloria, Rolando, and Paz all go to Frankie's apartment. Gloria tells Frankie she wants a divorce, and Frankie attacks Gloria as she screams for help. Valentino rushes to Frankie's apartment, and Frankie pushes Valentino down the stairs, knocking him unconscious. Paz grabs his father's gun and kills Frankie. Valentino is rushed to the hospital, where they discover that Valentino is brain dead. Orion says goodbye to Valentino and undergoes the heart transplant, which is successful.

When Scarlett comes to New York the next day, she watches the video Valentino made for her and finds a video Valentino filmed for Orion, which she shows to Orion. In the video, Valentino tells Orion to live his life for both of them.

== Reception ==
The First to Die at the End was a #1 New York Times Bestseller and received starred reviews from Publishers Weekly and Booklist.

Publishers Weekly called the novel "riveting", saying, "Through the boys' vulnerable alternating perspectives, interspersed with vignettes that explore varied supporting characters' relationships with death, Silvera crafts a stunning and thought-provoking narrative that examines difficult existential questions without eschewing hope."

Booklist described the novel as "An extraordinary—no, make that a brilliant—book with a riveting plot...Don't miss this one."

=== Accolades ===
Year	Accolade	Result	Ref.
2022	Barnes & Noble Best Teen & YA Book of the Year	Selection	
2022	Publishers Weekly Best Book — Young Adult	Winner	
2022	Goodreads Choice Award for Young Adult Fiction	Nominated	
2023	British Book Awards Book of the Year — Children's Fiction	Nominated	

== Series ==
The First to Die at the End is a prequel to They Both Die at the End, which was released on September 5, 2017. A third installment, No One Knows Who Dies At the End, was planned for publication in 2024, and later split into two books. The first, The Survivor Wants to Die at the End, was released on May 6, 2025. The second half, No One Knows Who Dies at the End, was set to be released in 2026.
