= Hex Hall =

Trilogy of novels by Rachel Hawkins

- Hex Hall (ISBN 9781847387226); Demonglass (ISBN 9781423128441); Spell Bound (ISBN 9781847389916)
- Author: Rachel Hawkins
- Country: United States
- Language: English
- Genre: Young adult Dark Fantasy; Paranormal Romance; Comedy
- Publisher: Hyperion Books
- Published: 2010–2012
- No. of books: 3
- Followed by: Hex Hall: School Spirits

Hex Hall is a best-selling trilogy of young adult paranormal romance novels by American author Rachel Hawkins. The trilogy is centered on Sophie Mercer, a sixteen-year-old witch who is sent to Hecate Hall (nicknamed "Hex Hall"), a boarding school for magical beings, after a string of disastrous spells gone wrong. While there, she gets caught up in the ongoing war between the Prodigium and the human organizations who seek to eradicate them from the world.

== Overview ==
The trilogy follows the exploits of Sophie Mercer, a young witch, who is sent to Hecate Hall ("Hex Hall"), a boarding school for Prodigium juvenile delinquents. An awkward, sarcastic girl, she becomes best friends with her vampire roommate, Jenna Talbot, who is an outcast like her. Sophie also gets swept up in a love triangle involving Archer, the school's resident bad boy, and Cal, her betrothed. Through a series of events, Sophie gets caught up in the secret war going on between the Prodigium and a group of humans who believe the Prodigium should be destroyed. As the trilogy progresses, Sophie discovers more about herself, powers, and the mystery behind her family's origins. Along with all of this she also meets an enemy

== Characters ==
Hex Hall has a large supporting cast of characters, whose plot significance varies by book.

=== Major characters ===
Sophia 'Sophie' Mercer/Atherton/Brannick

The narrator of the trilogy, who was sent to live at Hex Hall after a string of spells went disastrously wrong. After Sophie's mother discovered that her father was a warlock, they split up and Sophie lived solely with her mother. In order to keep Sophie a secret from her mother's family, the two were forced to move quite frequently. Upon attending Hex Hall, Sophie became close friends with her roommate, Jenna Talbot, the school's outcast. She finds herself caught up in a love triangle between Archer Cross and Alexander Callahan. Sarcastic, clumsy, and lazy, Sophie struggles to control her powers and avoid succumbing to her true nature as a demon.

Jennifer 'Jenna' Talbot

Sophie's best friend and roommate. A lesbian girl, Jenna was bitten by a vampire girl who she had fallen in love with who was later killed by The Eye. Lonely, snarky and guarded, Jenna is an outcast at Hex Hall due to her inherently violent nature as a vampire. She exhibits most powers generally associated with vampires such as heightened agility and strength. She wears a bloodstone -- a magical stone filled with the blood of a witch or wizard -- to control her vampire weaknesses (sunlight, garlic, etc.). For a short while she is sent to be questioned by the Prodigium Council, after being suspected of murdering two classmates. It is there she meets and falls in love with Vix, another vampire. Although she finds a home in a vampire coven, she believes her true place is with Sophie.

Archer Cross

A young, powerful warlock and Hex Hall's resident bad boy. While at first he frequently mocks Sophie due to her clumsiness and weak ability with magic, over time he comes to befriend and eventually fall in love with her. However, it is revealed that Archer is a member of The Eye (an organization that wants to kill all Prodigium), having been adopted by them as a child in order to help them fight the Prodigium. He was given the name Archer Cross after another warlock of the Eye. He feels conflicted over his family loyalty to The Eye and to Sophie. He is shunned from the Prodigium world and seen as a hostile enemy due to his association with The Eye, but does leave The Eye at the end of the series. It is later revealed that his real name is Daniel Anderson. His parents were killed by his uncle, and his cousin (Nick) who had been born a demon had tried to kill him not once, but twice.

Alexander 'Cal' Callahan

The groundskeeper of Hex Hall. He is betrothed to Sophie, and is in love with her. He is an extremely powerful white warlock, and has the unique ability to heal. He was sent to Hex Hall when he was thirteen when he healed someone and has lived there ever since. To Cal, Hex Hall is his home. At first Cal and Sophie hardly spoke to each other, but eventually they become friends.

=== Minor characters ===
Grace Mercer/Brannick

Sophie's mother. Grace was born a Brannick, but when she was 21, ran away from home and changed her last name to "Mercer". She went to England to find some other way she could help her family that didn't involve killing. It was in England that she met Sophie's father James. When Grace found out that he was a demon, they had already been together for a year, and she was pregnant with Sophie.

James Atherton

Sophie's father. Head of the Council. Went through the Removal in the end of the second book.

Anastasia Casnoff

Headmistress of Hecate Hall. Sister of Lara Cassnoff.

Elodie Parris

Dark witch. Killed by Sophie's great-grandmother Alice in the end of the first book. A member of a coven with Anna and Chaston.

Anna Gilroy

Friend of Elodie. Second to be attacked by Alice. Later turned into a demon by the Cassnoff sisters.

Chaston Burnett

Friend of Elodie. First to be attacked by Alice. Later turned into a demon like Anna.

Holly Mitchell

Jenna's first roommate. Accidentally murdered by the coven to raise a demon that just happened to be Alice.

Clarice Vanderltden (the Vandy)

Was put through the Removal by the Council. Clarice not only hates the Head of the Council, she also hates James' daughter.

Lara Cassnoff

Mrs. Cassnoff's sister. Second in command of the Council. Evil witch that was raising a bunch(batch?) of demons. Turned every student at Hecate Hall into a demon

Nick Anderson

Archer's cousin, demon raised by Lara.

Daisy

Another demon Lara raised. Nick's girlfriend in the end.

Kristopher

Was a Shifter and member in the Council that died at the end of the second book.

Roderick

Was a Faerie and member in the Council that died at the end of the second book.

Elizabeth

Was a Werewolf and member in the Council that died at the end of the second book.

Isolde 'Izzy' Brannick

Sister of Finley, cousin of Sophie, and daughter of Aislinn Brannick.

Finley Brannick

Sister of Izzy, cousin of Sophie, and daughter of Aislinn Brannick.

Aislinn Brannick

Big Mamma Brannick. Sister of Grace Brannick.

Torin

A warlock that attempted a spell back in 1587 that landed him in a mirror. Has the power of prophecy.

== Novels ==
=== Hex Hall ===
The story introduces Sophie Mercer as a witch who is ordered to attend school at Hex Hall after a long series of unfortunate spells that threaten to reveal the Prodigium world to the general human population, the spell that sent her to Hex Hall was a love spell that worked way too well. Reluctant, stubborn, and sarcastic, Sophie finds herself at odds with many people at Hex Hall, including a coven of dark witches and popular warlock Archer Cross. She becomes good friends with her vampire roommate, Jenna Talbot, despite the fact that Jenna was suspected the year before of murdering a classmate.

As Sophie attempts to adapt to this new world and learning to control her powers, the school is thrown into chaos after two other students are found attacked, drained of nearly all their blood. Jenna is again suspected of the attacks and is sent away for interrogation, despite Sophie's attempts to clear her best friend's name. Meanwhile, Sophie's great-grandmother, Alice, appears and extends the offer to help Sophie with her magic. Grateful for the help, Sophie is shocked to discover that she is much more powerful than she initially believed.

After getting in trouble with a teacher, Sophie is forced to spend time with Archer; the two fall in love, but Sophie is dismayed upon learning Archer is a member of The Eye, an Italian-based organization seeking to exterminate the Prodigium population, as they believe they are evil demons. Her life is thrown into further turmoil upon the discovery that her great-grandmother, Alice, is actually a demon who is responsible for the deaths at Hex Hall who was raised by the dark coven to help Prodigium defeat The Eye. Sophie ends up killing Alice with a special sword made of demonglass (a rare substance only found in hell), and learns that since she has demon blood, she could revert to demon nature and kill someone she loves, as did her grandmother, killing her grandfather. Sophie decides to go to London, and go through the Removal, which will take away her demon side.

=== Demonglass ===
After learning that she is not a witch but in fact a demon, Sophie requests to go through a process known as The Removal. Her father who's actually the head of The council, James Artherton, denies her request, persuading her to visit him in London at Thorne Abbey over the summer to learn to control her powers. She agrees to his proposal and travels to England with Jenna and Cal. Upon arriving, she meets the remaining members of The council as well as two children, Nick and Daisy, who had been turned into demons.

Sophie and her father begin to work on mastering her powers, culminating in Sophie helping her father steal an ancient spell book they believe will help them turn Nick and Daisy human once again. However, they discover the relevant pages in the book have been removed. Feeling neglected by and resentful of Jenna, who is enamored with her new girlfriend and desires to move away and join a vampire coven, Sophie begins to bond with Cal and attempts to befriend Nick and Daisy.

While at a Prodigium night club, Sophie and the others narrowly escape an attack by The Eye, who are looking for Sophie. Among the members of the attack is Archer, who secretly gives Sophie a magical coin she can use to communicate with him. Sophie ignores Archer's repeated attempts to talk to her, though later gives in when Archer attends her birthday party in disguise. After Sophie is attacked at the party, she and Archer use a portal called an Itineris to travel to Hex Hall, where they are attacked by humans that were used to be turned in to demons also known as ghouls.

Upon returning to England, Sophie confesses everything to her father, including the fact that she suspects the Casnoffs (the headmistress of Hex Hall and part of the council) to be behind Nick and Daisy's demon transformations. Elodie, who was previously murdered by Sophie's great-grandmother, appears as a ghost to warn Sophie of Archer being attacked by Nick. Sophie convinces Cal to heal Archer, who is immediately imprisoned by Sophie's father. The next day, Sophie is sentenced to go through the Removal, and her powers are rendered useless.

The Casnoffs' reveal they were indeed behind the demon raisings and subsequently force Sophie's father to go through the Removal as well. However, before Sophie is stripped completely of her powers, The Eye attacks Thorne Abbey, allowing Sophie to escape. Cal instructs Sophie to use the Itineris to go to her mother, who is currently staying with the Brannicks, one of the enemies of the Prodigium, and he kisses her. The novel ends as Sophie steps through the doorway.

=== Spell Bound ===
Sophie arrives at the homestead of the Brannicks, an ancient female clan that has been at war with the Prodigium, whose numbers are now dwindling. After being reunited, Sophie's mother explains that she was born into the Brannick's clan, but chose not to fight in the war against the Prodigium. At first wary of one another, Sophie and the Brannicks slowly begin to warm to each other. Meanwhile, Sophie reluctantly finds herself a companion in Elodie, and the two discover that Sophie is able to tap into her powers while Elodie is inhabiting her body.

After some time, Jenna and Archer manage to find Sophie, though almost immediately they are transported back to Hex Hall via a spell cast by the Casnoffs, who are using the school to imprison all of the recent Prodigium students. The Casnoffs plan on raising demons through the students, experimenting on which type of Prodigium will adapt best to the spell. While imprisoned at Hex Hall, the students—particularly Archer—undergo both physical and mental torture orchestrated by the Casnoffs. Meanwhile, Sophie finds herself conflicted between her love for both Cal and Archer, which is complicated by Elodie's intruding.

Sophie and the others learn of the Casnoffs ultimate plan, which is to raise an army of demons in a misguided attempt to protect the Prodigium from humans. Sophie and the others manage to escape Hex Hall through the Itineris after Sophie manages to regain her powers through sheer, desperate willpower. Sophie is reunited with her parents and the Brannicks, who explain they cannot defeat the demons that have been raised without the help of demonglass; Sophie, Jenna, Archer, and Cal journey to the Underworld to retrieve it, where they are forced to witness memories related to their tragic pasts. Sophie vows to kill the Casnoffs and break the demon spells, returning the Prodigium to their true forms.

A battle breaks out between the Casnoffs and Sophie's group. At first outnumbered, Archer manages to persuade a sect of The Eye to join in on the battle, in an attempt to help defeat a common enemy. Sophie and the others manage to defeat the Casnoffs and break the spell, however, Cal dies after sacrificing himself to save Sophie.

In the subsequent aftermath of the battle, Sophie is called into a meeting with The council, who offer her the position of Council Head, after witnessing her demonstrations of leadership and power in the fight against the Casnoffs. Sophie agrees to consider the offer, but explains that she would prefer to finish school first. In Cal's honor, Sophie requests that Hex Hall be re-opened, this time as a regular school for Prodigium students, and the Council acquiesces. Sophie releases her bond on Elodie, who is happily bound to Hex Hall. She joins a ghostly Cal for a walk on the grounds. Jenna and Archer return with Sophie to Hex Hall, explaining that they would prefer to stay with Sophie than to go off on their own, and Sophie realizes that she has finally found happiness.

== Spin-off novel ==
In March 2012, Rachel Hawkins announced on her book tour that she was currently writing a spin-off novel, with the book due to be published by Hyperion in 2013. This was later confirmed by Hawkins on her Livejournal, stating that the series was still untitled. Hawkins has hinted that it will focus on Izzy Brannick, who appeared in Spell Bound. It was later confirmed that book's name is School Spirits with a cover reveal on 19 November 2012.

=== School Spirits ===
School Spirits (published 2013), follows a new main character: Sophie's cousin Isolde 'Izzy" Brannick, after Izzy's sister Finley disappears mysteriously. Because of this, Izzy's mom enrolls her in a small town high school to go undercover for a new case. Izzy suspects that this is actually because her mother wants her to have a semblance of normal life, but she plays along, and prepares for her new life by binge-watching many high school drama shows with Torin, who she talks to regularly both through mirrors and in dreams, which he regularly brings her into. Izzy befriends students Anderson, Romy, and Dex, and after the paranormal mystery is solved, Dex leaves with her and her mom to go on a new case.

No new books have been confirmed.
