= History Is All You Left Me =

2017 novel by Adam Silvera

- Author: Adam Silvera
- Language: English
- Genre: Young Adult • Drama
- Publisher: Soho Teen
- Publication date: January 17, 2017
- Publication place: United States
- Media type: Print (hardcover and paperback), e-book, audiobook
- ISBN: 9781616956936

History Is All You Left Me is a young adult novel by Adam Silvera, published January 17, 2017 by Soho Teen.

It focuses on 18-year-old Griffin Jennings and his past relationship with Theodore "Theo" McIntyre until their breakup a year before his death; and the aftermath, where Griffin struggles with moving on.

== Plot ==
=== History: June 8, 2014 – November 13, 2016 ===
16-year-old Griffin Jennings meets his friend Theo McIntyre at a local flea market to find items from their favourite franchises. Although the item Theo gets for Griffin is not really accurate, he accepts it regardless.

On the way back, both of them confess their feelings for each other and as the summer progresses, they officially start dating after Griffin invites Theo to a quiz event in order to impress him. However, Theo looks past his blunder and remains firm in his love for Griffin. The two have sex for the first time, and are found out by their mutual friend Wade, who had suspected their relationship all along. At a birthday party for Theo's sister Denise, the two come out to their parents, who accept them.

After an awkward encounter with Griffin's father when they're buying condoms, much to Wade's amusement; Theo reveals he is bisexual. Griffin is hesitant at first, fearing competitiveness, but he accepts him while Theo assures him that he still loves him.

Once school is back in session, their relationship becomes public. Theo informs Griffin that the school counsellor thinks he could skip ahead one year to start college and that he is considering one in California. Though Griffin expresses his support, in reality he doesn't like the development.

Come Halloween, Theo is writing up his draft essay to send to college despite his promise to join both Griffin and Wade at a Halloween party. Wade goes on ahead to the party, while Griffin stays behind to comfort Theo, who is stressed out, and decides to help him with his essay.

Griffin and Theo spend their after Christmas dinner at Wade's to carry out their tradition of opening Christmas presents. Wade gives Theo a puzzle of him and Griffin, while Theo gives Griffin gryphons and Wade a photo of the two together. On New Year's Eve, Griffin gets emotional hearing a song while he and Theo lay down together. Theo comforts him as they count down to midnight going into the new year.

By March 2015, Theo has been accepted into Santa Monica College and receives school equipment in preparation for the semester. Two months later, he celebrates Griffin's birthday with him and Wade. Griffin admits to him that he will miss him when he's gone to California. Theo assures that they will stay in touch.

When the time comes for Theo to depart for California, he walks out into the road and is nearly hit by a car when Griffin and Wade accompany him to the post office. While waiting there, Griffin asks Theo to break up, not convinced that they will survive a long distance relationship. Despite this, Griffin reaffirms his love for Theo.

As the semester begins, Griffin and Theo stay routinely in touch, but by Halloween, Griffin is finally introduced to Jackson, who surprises Theo before driving him to a Halloween party off campus. Weeks later, Theo admits that he feels something about Jackson, and Griffin encourages him to pursue it. Despite this, deep down, he longs to get Theo back.

When Theo's birthday roles around, Griffin decides against attending his birthday dinner due to Jackson. Wade fails to convince him to attend the dinner. Later, Griffin calls Theo to wish him a happy birthday. A hurt Theo attempts to get him to open up, but he hangs up.

When his own birthday comes around in May, Griffin begins to wonder if Theo forgot it, since he hasn't called to congratulate him. However, a package with navy boots serves as compensation and when he meets Wade and Theo a month later, Theo admits he forgot to call him. On the subway, Griffin feels excluded as Theo and Wade catch up. When they arrive at the next station, Griffin pulls Theo aside and asks if he still loves him. He confirms this and confesses their relationship has been questionable ever since their break up. Theo also admits he would drop Jackson for Griffin should he also choose to study in California. As much as this makes Griffin hopeful, he still keeps a reasonable distance from the plausibility.

Two months later, while visiting Wade, Griffin rants about what Theo said on the subway and the chances of them getting back together. Wade continuously blames Theo for Griffin's mixed feelings, while also asking that he stop defending him. Unexpectedly, he kisses Griffin and the two have sex. Once done, Griffin leaves in a hurry, feeling that he betrayed their friendship.

In the months leading up to Theo's death, Griffin and Wade pursue a sexual relationship, but are unsure what to label it. In addition, Wade is questioning his sexuality, but admits his attraction to boys. Griffin finds himself tending to their sexual relationship as if he is getting back at Theo because of Jackson. Wade reveals that he had confided in Theo about liking boys back when Griffin and he were dating, contributing to Griffin realising how little he has cared for Wade the entire time and how much Wade has actually cared about him. Gradually, Wade convinces Griffin to let go of his hopes of getting Theo back and imagine a potential future with him. Theo later also informs them that Jackson wants him to cut ties with Griffin, albeit not permanently.

On the day of Theo's death, Griffin decides to prelude a conversation with Theo about his and Wade's relationship, but only keeps it brief when Theo's number goes to voice mail. Later, his mother calls to inform him of Theo's death. Initially Griffin refuses to believe it, until it dawns on him and breaks down. He storms out into icy cold streets in just underwear and socks, and almost commits suicide by jumping in front of a moving car. But he saves himself, knowing that Theo wouldn't want him to be hurt.

=== Today: November 20, 2016 – January 7, 2017 ===
One week after Theo's death, his funeral is held, but Griffin is uneasy knowing that his new boyfriend Jackson is present, who also gives a eulogy about how much he loved Theo equally so as Griffin's eulogy.

During Thanksgiving dinner with their relatives, one of Griffin's older cousins expresses something homophobic against Theo after Griffin tries to maintain the illusion that Theo is still alive to his grandmother who is suffering from dementia. His parents decides to leave early after Griffin almost hits his older cousin.

Later in the week, Theo's mother reaches out to Griffin and tells him that Jackson wants to contact him, which he reluctantly accepts. The two stroll around the block and stop at a fountain Griffin and Theo used to frequent. He and Jackson share positive memories of Theo and how much he will be missed. Griffin invites him over to his place to continue their conversation.

At Griffin's place, Jackson bluntly asks him if he hates him due to him being Theo's new boyfriend. Admittedly he does, but Griffin doesn't say so out loud. Jackson decides to leave, thinking a possible good connection with Griffin is out of the question, but Griffin asks him to stay, knowing he should get along with Jackson.

The next morning the two head back to Theo's place, with a detour to a game shop Griffin and Theo used to frequent. There he also opens up to Jackson about his OCD. At Theo's place, Griffin is reunited with Theo's parents and sister, Denise. He and Jackson decides to enter Theo's now abandoned room once the family has left for a party to one of Denise's friends. Griffin storms out once he notices pictures of Theo and Jackson instead of him, and returns home. He goes to bed, drowned in sorrow and confronts his father about subtly being hostile to Jackson that morning. He then asks his parents to give him some space.

Griffin decides to apologise to Jackson for his abrupt departure and they agree to meet in Central Park, intended as a tour of New York's "troll tunnels". After sharing a cup of hot chocolate, the two stroll past the tunnels and admit to one another that they never hated each other as individuals, but rather the shared history with Theo. Griffin offers Jackson to stay even though he is meant to return to California the next day. He elaborates that he wants them to work on healing together and further offers him to stay at his place despite his father's protests. Jackson agrees to this and moves in the following week.

As December rolls around, Griffin and Jackson head outside in a blizzard to make a snowman, which later becomes a snowwoman. Griffin accompanies him to meet two friends of his from NYU, Veronika and Anika. However, when their conversation begins, it quickly turns into an argument where Veronika accuses him of obsessing over Theo, all the while Griffin grows uncomfortable listening in. When Jackson confronts her about her latest boyfriend, she reveals that she had an abortion because of him and tells Jackson to check in next time he sees relationship statuses change and storms off. Anika remains sympathetic to Jackson, even though she agrees with most of Veronika's sentiment and goes to comfort her. Griffin and Jackson leave for the High Line, where the latter ponders about how they keep pushing people away. On the way home, Griffin tells him that maybe they should let friendships collapse before everything comes back together again.

Griffin has an episode at the school library, which nearly leads to a confrontation with a sophomore student, however Wade drags him away in time. When he misspeaks in an attempt to calm him down, Griffin storms out and heads home. Following the episode, his parents decide he should receive professional help, but he dismisses this. His parents also think Jackson is the cause of the episode and are willing to send him home. Jackson does exactly this, but Griffin suggests he could join him in California, however, his parents overrule the idea.

Shortly before Jackson is due to return to California, he and Griffin visit Theo's grave and Griffin decides to go against his parents' ruling to join Jackson anyway. When the day comes, Wade comes over for a brief visit, but leaves disgusted with Griffin and Jackson getting along. Griffin later sneaks out after Jackson's cab departs and he lets him in further down the road. Having not taken a plane before, Griffin is nervous, but Jackson comforts him as they depart New York. His mother deduces he left for California when calling him when they're in a cab heading for Jackson's home. Despite feeling betrayed, both Griffin's mother and father accepts him travelling as long as he pledges to go to therapy upon his return. Arriving at Jackson's house, Griffin settles into his room and gets acquainted with Jackson's mother and dog Chloe, with the former being informed about his situation. In Jackson's room, Griffin spots his and Theo's names carved into the wall. Jackson explains it came to be after they argued following Theo answering a call from Griffin and Theo proved his allegiance to Jackson. Shortly after, Griffin suggests they go out, which Jackson agrees to and they drive out with the music high and aimlessly.

Griffin and Jackson stop at a church, where he surprises Griffin by offering to teach him how to drive. The two later head to campus and bag down Theo's belongings. They later go to the spot Jackson and Theo first met. After Griffin awkwardly mentions how they should move on, they head back to Jackson's place. When night falls, he offers Griffin to sleep in his king size bed, which Griffin is hesitant about until Jackson insists.

On the one month anniversary of Theo's death, Griffin and Jackson visit the Santa Monica beach, where Theo drowned. Jackson shows him pictures from their last day, and the two head out to the ocean. Griffin breaks down and punches the sea until submerging himself. Jackson rescues him and drags him back to shore. Upon returning home, the two watch a movie Griffin was too scared to watch when he was younger. Jackson demonstrates different kissing variants, that unbeknown to him, Griffin taught Theo before his departure to California. The two then have sex. The next morning, they try to clear the air about the previous nights' events. Jackson confesses that he looked for a lifeguard rather than going out to save Theo himself. Griffin becomes enraged and punches him multiple times before storming out the house, and vomits. He ignores Jackson throughout the rest of the day and travels home in the afternoon.

Upon his return home, Griffin goes to therapy, but finds it hard to open up about his experiences. Internally, he makes a promise to Theo, vowing to be truthful about what happened when he came to visit ten months prior.

Having recounted internally what really happened while Theo was away in California, Griffin decides to visit Wade, who is revealed to be grounded at home after skipping school for three days. He tells him about his visit to California with Jackson, but leaves out them having sex. Wade praises the visit, but also questions what their own relationship was. Griffin argues that they should resume being friends and that he isn't ready for a new relationship yet, which Wade accepts. A few days later, the two join forces to look after Theo's sister Denise while her parents are Christmas shopping. They spend their time playing different puzzle games and watching a movie. When she falls asleep, Griffin goes to look in Theo's room, receiving a questioning look from Wade before joining him and Denise again. He also receives a cryptic message from Jackson, which he ignores.

On Christmas Day, Griffin and his parents again spend time with their relatives, but he keeps himself away from his homophobic cousin. He accompanies his grandmother, looking back on her favourite art animation Theo made. Later, he takes a walk with Wade home. Wade challenges him by breaking his compulsions, which Griffin accepts. Once back at Wade's home, they listen to music that they once heard when Theo was alive. Afterwards, Griffin opens up to Wade and tells him the truth about what happened in California and his contact with Theo's spirit. However, Wade is not surprised, citing that it's in Griffin's nature to do things he knows he shouldn't whenever he isn't in his "best space". Despite Griffin's protests, Wade indicates that he wants him to leave.

During Boxing Week, Griffin reconnects with Jackson and clears everything up with him. He also tries to reach out to Wade again, but is ignored until New Year's Eve, when he answers and accepts Griffin's invitation to join his family's New Year countdown. In the final minutes of the year, Griffin confesses his guilty feeling about Theo's death, and Wade likewise shares his hard feelings about Jackson and him. They agree to give their relationship a try, and share a kiss when the New Year's countdown to stops.

Several days into 2017, Griffin and Wade join Jackson in visiting Theo's family. There, both Griffin and Jackson admit their guilt contributing to Theo's death. Theo's parents however forgives them and reasons that they have enough with feeling guilty themselves. They also approve Griffin and Wade's relationship as they hold hands for the first time. Later, Griffin and Wade see Jackson off, as he aims to repair his friendship with Veronika and Anika before heading home to have his "Theo time". Griffin also vows to continue to take care of him.

Wade assists Griffin with his homework, and he plans to return to school the following week. Wade accompanies him to his next therapy appointment with a new doctor, who later diagnoses Griffin with delusion disorder. The day after, he visits Theo's grave and places his hoodie on the headstone. Having finally managed to move on, Griffin asks one last question, wondering if he got their history right.

== Characters ==
Griffin "Griff" Jennings
The protagonist and former boyfriend of Theo McIntyre. He also has OCD
Theodore Daniel "Theo" McIntyre
Griffin's former friend and later boyfriend
Jackson Wright
Theo's new boyfriend, whom he met when he moved to California for college
Wade Juliette
Griffin and Theo's mutual friend
Gregor Jennings
Griffin's father
Mrs. Jennings
Griffin's mother
Russell McIntyre
Theo's father
Ellen McIntyre
Theo's mother
Denise McIntyre
Theo's younger sister

== Reception ==
History Is All You Left Me received starred reviews from Booklist, Publishers Weekly, School Library Journal, and Kirkus, as well as positive reviews from The Bulletin of the Center for Children’s Books and The Horn Book Magazine. The book is a Junior Library Guild selection.

Before publication, Paste, Kirkus Reviews, and Entertainment Weekly named it one of the most anticipated young adult novels of the year following his 2015 debut, More Happy Than Not.

Booklist revered the book, saying that "splendid sophomore novel is filled with tantalizing questions about lies and honesty, love and loss, and past and present, with answers gradually metered out through Griffin’s growth as well as that of the other characters populating this beautifully realized, character-driven work of literary fiction."

Kirkus applauded Silvera's writing, noting, "The conversational yet profound tone of the book highlights the author’s ear for the musicality of language and his ability to convey deep emotion through attention to its cadence and flow." Publishers Weekly echoed the sentiment, stating that Silvera "excels at capturing the confusion and pain [the main character] feels."

The audiobook, narrated by Tom Picasso, received a mixed review from Booklist, who noted that "Picasso captures Griffin’s adolescent grief and depression with heartbreaking realism. He also gives Theo a distinctive, noticeably deeper voice and thankfully avoids a stereotyping sound for sidekick Wade, who’s African American. Picasso is less adept at creating an individual voice for Jackson, Theo’s California boyfriend, making Griffin’s imagined conversations between himself, Jackson, and Theo confusing at times. Picasso also misreads some text (unites for unties, for instance)."

TIME and Entertainment Weekly named History Is All You Left Me one of the best young adult books of the year.

Beyond popular media, History Is All You Left Me has been analyzed academically for its portrayal of queerness, written by a gay author.

Year	Award	Result	Ref.
2018	American Library Association Rainbow List	Selection	
2017	Goodreads Choice Award for Young Adult Fiction	Nominee	
