= What If It's Us =

2018 novel by Becky Albertalli and Adam Silvera

- Authors: Becky Albertalli and Adam Silvera
- Language: English
- Genre: Young adult Romantic comedy
- Publisher: HarperTeen, Simon and Schuster
- Publication date: October 18, 2018
- Publication place: United States
- Media type: Print (hardcover and paperback), e-book, audiobook
- Pages: 448
- ISBN: 978-1471176395

What If It's Us is a young adult romantic comedy novel series written by Becky Albertalli and Adam Silvera, published by HarperTeen and Simon and Schuster. The series consists of two books: What If It's Us (2019) and Here's to Us (2021).

What If It's Us focuses on Arthur and Ben, two teenage boys who meet each other by chance at a post office and fall for each other. The novel is told in alternating chapters from the point of view of each protagonist. Here's to Us follows Arthur and Ben's chance reunion in New York several years after the ending of the first book.

What If It's Us marked the first time Albertalli and Silvera collaborated after being friends for many years.

The audiobook is read by American actors Noah Galvin (Arthur) and Froy Gutierrez (Ben).

== Plot summary ==
On a coffee run for his NYC office, Arthur notices a cute boy and follows him into a nearby post office, where he overhears the boy discuss the breakup box he's mailing to his ex-boyfriend. After unsuccessfully attempting to track him down, Ben heads to his best friend Dylan's house to hang out, where Dylan reveals that he has met a barista that he really likes, named Samantha.

Arthur begins to lose hope of finding Post Office Boy until he remembers the ‘Dream N Bean’ Coffee shirt he was wearing when they met, so he hangs a poster seeking him on the ‘Dream N Bean’ Coffee in-store noticeboard. Meanwhile, the boy, whose name is Ben, struggles with attending summer school because his ex-boyfriend, Hudson, is repeating the same class. Also searching for Arthur, he enlists Dylan and Samantha to help. Catching up with Dylan at ‘Dream N Bean’, Ben is stunned to see his own face staring back at him from Arthur's poster on the in-store noticeboard and after reading Arthur's message, they finally reconnect when Ben emails Arthur in response to the poster.

Ben and Arthur start dating, but when Arthur finds out that Ben still has the break-up box, he questions whether Ben is invested in the relationship. After a couple more dates, Arthur and Ben have their first kiss and the two almost have sex but stop when they realize that Arthur isn't ready.

When Arthur surprises Ben after Ben's summer school class, he discovers Hudson was also attending and breaks up with Ben. Minutes after the breakup, Jessie and Ethan call Arthur and reveal that they've been in a relationship for months and were scared to tell Arthur, who suddenly finds himself estranged from not only Ben, but also Jessie and Ethan.

After Dylan ends up in the hospital, Ben texts Arthur, telling him how scared he is. Arthur rushes to the hospital to support Ben and they get back together. After a late night impromptu birthday party, Arthur and Ben have sex for the first time. Ben sends Arthur the new chapters of his fantasy novel, having written Arthur into the plot as a birthday gift.

At the end of summer, Arthur must return to Georgia. Arthur and Ben part as friends rather than trying to force a potentially doomed long-distance relationship and they say a tearful goodbye.

== Characters ==
- Arthur Seuss - A sixteen-year-old boy interning at his mom's law firm in New York City over the summer. He is obsessed with Broadway, especially the musical Hamilton by Lin-Manuel Miranda. Arthur was written by Becky Albertalli.
- Benjamin "Ben" Alejo - A white-passing Puerto Rican high schooler who lives in New York and has to go to summer school in order to avoid being held back. He is a writer. Ben was written by Adam Silvera.
- Hudson Robinson - Ben's ex-boyfriend.
- Harriett - Ben's ex-friend.
- Dylan Boggs - Ben's best friend. He is obsessed with coffee and enjoys playing video games with Ben, though Ben describes him as a hopeless romantic who often gets consumed when he is dating someone.
- Samantha O'Malley - Dylan's love interest.
- Jessie - One of Arthur's best friends from home.
- Ethan Gerson - One of Arthur's best friends from home. He mentions that Ethan has been acting weirdly towards him ever since he came out as gay.
- Juliet and Namrata - Arthur's friends at the law firm.

== Reception ==
=== What If It's Us ===
What If It's Us received starred reviews from Kirkus Reviews, Publishers Weekly, and School Library Journal, as well as a positive review from Booklist.

Accolades for What If It's Us
Year	Accolade	Result	Ref.
2018	Goodreads Choice Award for Young Adult Fiction	Nominee	
2019	Best Fiction for Young Adults	Top 10	
2020	Rhode Island Teen Book Award	Honor	

=== Here's To Us ===
''Here's To Us'' received starred reviews from Kirkus and Booklist. It was a #1 New York Times bestseller.

== Cancelled adaptation ==
In September 2018, Albertalli and Silvera sold the movie rights to the novel to Anonymous Content. Brian Yorkey was subsequently attached as the screenwriter for the film. However, Silvera revealed in a Threads post that production was set to begin in 2020 but was cancelled due to the COVID-19 pandemic.
