= A Marriage Below Zero =

1889 novel by Alan Dale

- Author: Alan Dale
- Language: English
- Publisher: G.W. Dillingham, New York City
- Publication date: 1889
- Publication place: United States
- Media type: Print
- Text: A Marriage Below Zero at Wikisource

A Marriage Below Zero is a novel by Alan Dale. Published in 1889, it has been described as the first English-language novel portraying a romantic relationship between two men. It is a melodrama told from the point of view of a young woman who realises her new husband has been in a long-standing affair with another man.

== Plot ==
The book is told from the point of view of Elsie Bouverie, a pretty, frivolous English girl who falls in love with handsome, quiet Arthur Ravener. They marry, and Elsie gradually comes to realise that she has competition for Arthur's affection in the form of Captain Dillington, Arthur's male lover. Elsie engages a private detective who provides her with an address in Notting Hill; she goes there to find Dillington and Arthur together. Elsie and Arthur leave London for New York City. While there they attend a service given by a clergyman who preaches against sodomy. This affects Arthur to such an extent that he leaves Elsie. Some years later, Elsie travels to Paris where she believes Arthur and Dillington have become involved in a homosexual scandal. She goes to the hotel where she believes Arthur is staying, only to find him dead in his room.

== Major themes ==
The book is notable for its portrayal of a gay romance at a time when mainstream fiction avoided this topic. It is the first English-language gay-themed novel, and establishes the pattern of gay novels ending in death, especially suicide. Its melodramatic format is closely linked to its author's occupation as a New York drama critic at a time when the primary American theatre form was melodrama.

Its publication roughly coincided with the Cleveland Street scandal, a case that had been developing for years involving a London gay brothel.

== Publication history ==
- 1889, USA, G.W. Dillingham, Paperback
- 2012, USA, Nabu Press, Paperback (reprint)
- 2017, USA, Amazon Digital Services (Kindle edition)
- 2017, Canada, Broadview, Paperback

== Reception ==
The book met with mixed reviews. An anonymous reviewer in Bedford's Magazine described it as "A saturnalia in which the most monstrous forms of human vice exhibit themselves shamelessly"; while an approving review in the New York World described it as "Absolutely unconventional".

== See also ==
- List of gay novels prior to the Stonewall riots

== Bibliography ==
- Marshall, Gail (2007). The Cambridge Companion to the Fin de Siècle. Cambridge University Press.
- Haggerty, George (2000). Encyclopedia of Gay Histories and Cultures. Routledge, London.
- Kaye, Richard (2013). "Oh God, There is No Woman In This": A Marriage Below Zero, the Somerset and Russell Scandals, and the Sodomitical Threat to Victorian Marriage. Victorian Review, Vol. 39, No. 2.
- Kaye, Richard A.,"The Return of Damon and Pythias: Alan Dale's "A Marriage Below Zero", Victorian Melodrama, and the Emergence of a Literature of Homosexual Representation," College Literature, Vol. 29, No. 2 (Spring, 2002), pp. 50–79
