= Adam Silvera =

American author (born 1990)

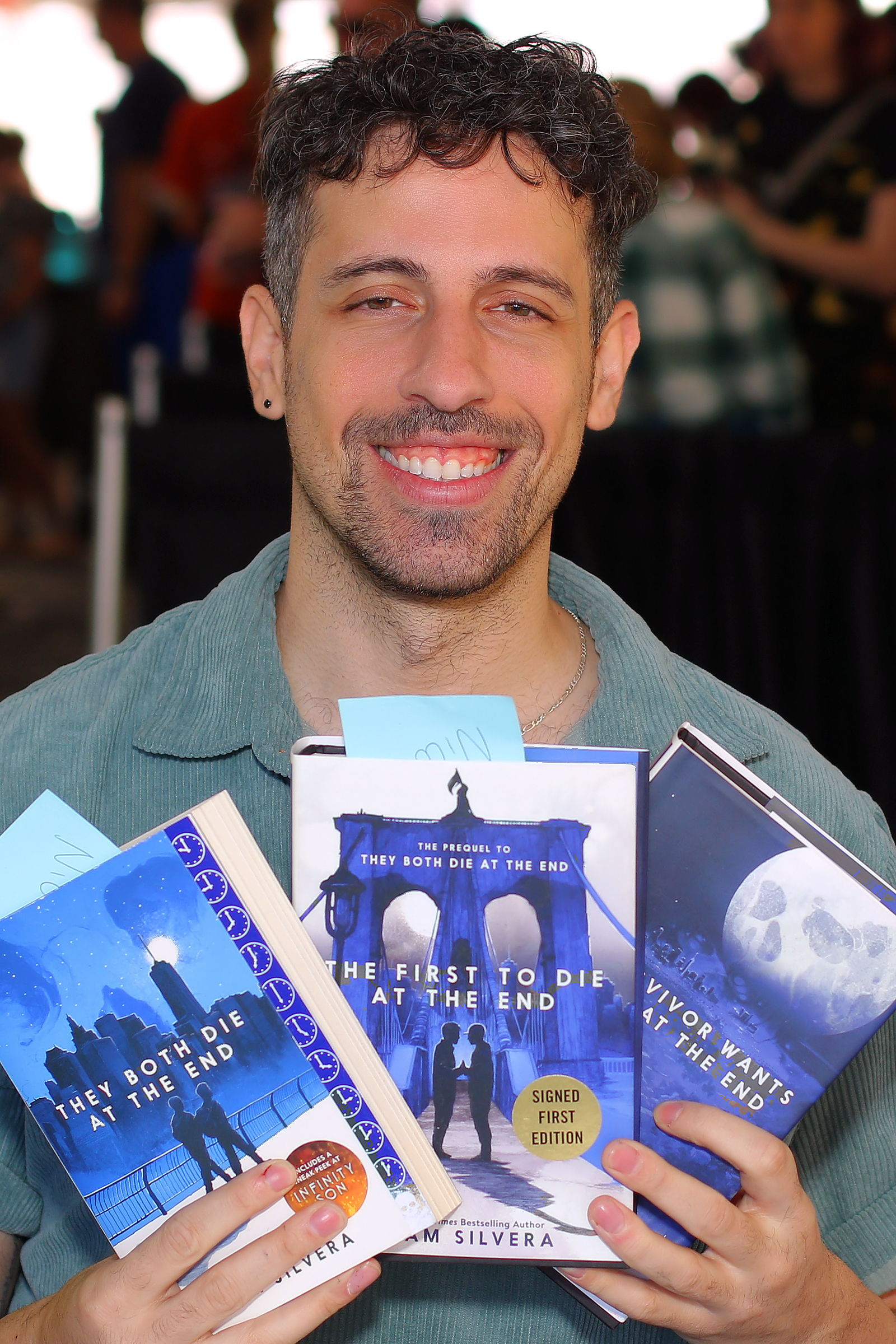
- Silvera at the 2025 Texas Book Festival
- Born: June 7, 1990 (age 36); New York City, U.S.
- Writing career
- Years active: 2015–present
- Genres: Young adult; LGBT
- Notable works: The First to Die at the End; They Both Die at the End; Infinity Son; History Is All You Left Me; What If It's Us (co-authored with Becky Albertalli)
- Website: adamsilvera.com

Adam Silvera (born June 7, 1990) is an American author of young adult fiction. His work frequently centers on queer characters and explores themes of identity, grief, and mortality. He is known for the bestselling novels More Happy Than Not (2015), History Is All You Left Me (2017), and They Both Die at the End (2017), which gained renewed public interest in 2020 through Tiktok's BookTok sub-community.

== Early life ==
Adam Silvera was born and raised in the South Bronx in New York City. His mother, Persi Rosa, is Puerto Rican and worked as a social worker. He began writing at a young age, producing fan fiction for franchises such as Harry Potter and Marvel, beginning around age eleven. Silvera has stated that he was interested in storytelling throughout his childhood, often prioritizing writing over schoolwork.

Although he read widely as a teenager, he has cited Cassandra Clare’s The Mortal Instruments series as an early influence, noting that it was the first time he encountered queer characters in fantasy literature. Silvera has also mentioned Benjamin Alire Sáenz’s Aristotle and Dante Discover the Secrets of the Universe as an important early example of queer Latino representation in YA fiction for him.

Silvera did not pursue a traditional college path, instead, he worked in various positions within the book industry. He was employed at Barnes & Noble, initially in the café before moving to the sales floor, where he became familiar with contemporary young adult literature. He later worked at the independent bookstore Books of Wonder and as a reviewer for Shelf Awareness. Silvera has explained that these roles, along with courses at the Gotham Writers Workshop, served as an informal education in publishing and craft. He has said that he “built (his) own MFA” by working in the book industry and taking writing courses.

Silvera has also spoken publicly about aspects of his identity and mental health. He has described himself as gay and has been open about his experiences with depression, suicidal ideation, and his diagnosis of borderline personality disorder. In a 2021 interview, Silvera stated that he initially wrote "straight narrators" because he had not encountered mainstream books featuring queer characters during his adolescence, noting that increased industry support for diverse stories helped make his own career possible.

== Career ==
Silvera’s debut novel, More Happy Than Not, was published in 2015 by Soho Teen. His second novel, History Is All You Left Me, was released in January 2017. Later that year, Silvera published They Both Die at the End with HarperTeen. The novel was optioned for television in 2019 and has since been reported as in active development, with Silvera attached as creator, screenwriter, and executive producer. Silvera also co-authored What If It’s Us with Becky Albertalli, published by HarperTeen in 2018. Film rights to the novel were acquired the same year, with Brian Yorkey announced as screenwriter. A sequel, Here’s to Us, was released in 2021.

Silvera also expanded into the fantasy genre with the Infinity Cycle series, beginning with Infinity Son in 2020. The series continued with Infinity Reaper (2021) and Infinity Kings (2024). Silvera has described the Infinity Cycle as a long-developed project, noting in interviews that earlier versions of the story date back to his late teenage years.

Beginning in 2020, They Both Die at the End experienced renewed commercial visibility as a result of its popularity on BookTok, leading to its return to national bestseller lists. In a 2021 interview, Silvera credited the novel’s renewed commercial success, particularly in the UK, to TikTok’s BookTok community, stating that readers connected with its themes during the COVID-19 pandemic. In turn, Silvera later published the Death-Cast prequel The First to Die at the End in 2022, followed by The Survivor Wants to Die at the End in 2025. He has also announced an additional installment, No One Knows Who Dies at the End, scheduled for release in 2026.

== Literary themes and academic reception ==
Silvera has stated that writing queer characters is central to his creative practice. In a 2021 interview, he explained that his early experiences as a queer Puerto Rican reader shaped his commitment to centering queer protagonists in his fiction, noting that he does not feel compelled to contribute to what he described as an already extensive body of heterosexual narratives. By his early thirties, Silvera had published eight young adult novels, all of which feature queer main characters.

He has also explained that his exploration of mortality in the Death-Cast novels was shaped by events from his adolescence. In a 2022 interview, he explained that witnessing the aftermath of the September 11 attacks, along with the subsequent death of a family member in a plane crash, contributed to his interest in stories about the unpredictability of death and the desire for characters to confront what remains unsaid in their lives.

Scholarly interest in Silvera’s work, particularly They Both Die at the End, has grown in recent years, with multiple studies examining the novel’s treatment of identity, mortality, and social structures. A 2022 paper in Research on Diversity in Youth Literature examines the novel’s representation of queer Latinx characters, noting its depiction of a bisexual Latino protagonist and its attention to varied forms of queer identity. The study also highlights the contrast between the two central characters’ relationships to their sexuality, suggesting that the novel presents more than one pathway to queer self-understanding.

A 2024 study positions the novel within broader trends in contemporary young adult fiction, arguing that it moves beyond narratives focused primarily on coming-out stories or sexuality-based tragedy. According to this study, the book has been discussed in relation to themes such as intimacy, agency, and grief.

Another 2024 academic study analyzes the novel through Marxist and psychoanalytic frameworks, focusing on how the Death-Cast system shapes characters’ lives and social institutions within the story. This analysis argues that Silvera portrays a “death ethos” shaped by capitalist and ideological structures, with the Death-Cast system functioning as a force that influences institutions and individual decision-making. The study further suggests that the novel’s alternating first-person narration emphasizes how adolescent subjectivity is formed within these social constraints. The research in this study also identifies the novel’s resurgence on platforms such as TikTok as a factor in its recent cultural visibility.

Discussing the themes of They Both Die at the End, Silvera noted that the novel’s focus is “about the journey and not the destination.” Critics and scholars have noted recurring themes across Silvera’s works, including grief, memory, mortality, queer identity, and the tension between fate and personal agency.

== Reception and cultural impact ==
Silvera’s debut novel, More Happy Than Not, became a New York Times bestseller and was shortlisted for the Lambda Literary Award for Children’s and Young Adult Literature.

Several of Silvera’s works have also appeared in school book ban discussions, and More Happy Than Not was listed in PEN America’s Index of School Book Bans following its removal from multiple Florida school districts during 2022–23.

In June 2020, in recognition of the 50th anniversary of the first LGBTQ Pride parade, Queerty named Silvera one of fifty LGBTQ “heroes” noted for contributions to equality and representation.

In 2021, They Both Die at the End experienced a major rise in readership. According to Deadline, the novel reached No. 1 on the New York Times Young Adult Paperback Best Sellers list and became the bestselling YA novel of 2021, with the report attributing the renewed visibility to reader activity on TikTok’s BookTok community and increased print runs to meet demand.

In November 2022, the New York Times Young Adult Hardcover Best Sellers list included They Both Die at the End among the top-selling titles, reflecting the book’s continued commercial reach several years after publication.

In October 2022, The First to Die at the End debuted at No. 1 on the New York Times Young Adult Hardcover list, marking a strong commercial launch for the Death-Cast prequel. A subsequent New York Times list from September 2023 showed the novel remaining on the hardcover bestseller list for 48 weeks, indicating sustained readership over nearly a full year.

In May 2025, the New York Times Children’s and Young Adult Series Best Sellers list included Silvera’s Death-Cast series among the top-selling book series in the United States, demonstrating continued interest in the novels and their cultural presence beyond their initial release periods.

== Publications ==
=== Novels ===
==== Standalone books ====
- More Happy Than Not (SoHo Teen, 2015)

A novel exploring identity, sexuality, and the relationship between memory and selfhood."

- More Happy Ending – a deluxe edition of More Happy Than Not which includes an additional final chapter, a foreword by Angie Thomas and an afterword by Silvera (2020)
- History Is All You Left Me (SoHo Teen, 2017)

A novel examining grief, mental health, and the complexities of past and present relationships.

==== Death-Cast series ====
- They Both Die at the End (HarperTeen, 2017)

A novel set in a speculative world where individuals receive advance notice of their deaths, focusing on connection, mortality, and choice.

1. The Father Does Not Die at the End (short story), (2022), published as part of They Both Die at the End, Collector's Edition

A companion short story expanding the Death-Cast universe.

- The First to Die at the End (2022) (prequel)

A prequel exploring the origins of the Death-Cast system and the early impact of mortality prediction technology.

1. Dalma Does Not Die at the End (2022)

A companion short story expanding the Death-Cast universe, published in the Barnes & Noble first edition of The First to Die at the End.

- The Survivor Wants to Die at the End (2025)

A continuation of the Death-Cast series centering themes of survival, uncertainty, and social pressure.

- No One Knows Who Dies at the End (2026)

Upcoming novel in the Death-Cast series, which includes returning characters from earlier installments and further develops the Death-Cast universe.

==== What If It's Us series ====
- What If It's Us, co-authored with Becky Albertalli (HarperTeen, 2018)

A contemporary YA novel about chance connection, romantic possibility, and queer relationships.

- Here's To Us, co-authored with Becky Albertalli (HarperTeen/Balzer + Bray, 2021)

A sequel exploring reunion, personal growth, and the reconsideration of past relationships.

==== The Infinity Cycle series ====
- Infinity Son (2020)

A fantasy novel involving magical conflict, sibling relationships, and tensions between magical and non-magical communities.

- Infinity Reaper (2021)

A continuation of the series focusing on political division, responsibility, and shifting alliances.

- Infinity Kings (2024)

The concluding novel focusing on the ongoing war, power struggles, and fractured family bonds.

=== Short stories ===
- Because You Love to Hate Me: 13 Tales of Villainy (contributing writer) (Bloomsbury, 2017)

Silvera contributed the story “You, You, It’s All About You” to this anthology that reinterprets fairy tales from the perspective of the villains.

- (Don't) Call Me Crazy (contributing writer) (Algonquin, 2018)

Silvera contributed “Happiness Goes On” to this collection, a personal essay reflecting on mental health and identity.

- Color Outside the Lines (SoHo Teen, 2019)

Silvera contributed the story “Something Gay and Magical” to this anthology, highlighting LGBTQ+ and interracial relationships.

== Screen adaptations ==
Several of Silvera’s works have been optioned for film and television, with multiple projects reported as in active development.

In 2020, HBO Max announced that More Happy Than Not was being developed as a one-hour television series, with Silvera and producer Drew Comins attached as executive producers.

Silvera’s 2017 novel They Both Die at the End has undergone multiple stages of adaptation. The book was initially optioned by HBO in 2019, with Chris Kelly set to write the pilot and J.J. Abrams attached as an executive producer. In 2021, eOne had acquired the rights after they became available, and Silvera plans to serve as creator, screenwriter, and executive producer on a new television adaptation of the novel. Drew Comins was again reported as producer through his deal with eOne, marking a continued partnership between the studio and the author.

Film rights for What If It’s Us, co-authored with Becky Albertalli, were acquired by Anonymous Content in 2018, with Brian Yorkey announced as the screenwriter for the adaptation.

As of December 2025, no release dates have been announced for the television or film versions of his works.
