= Rachel Hawkins (writer) =

American writer

- Born: November 23, 1979 (age 46); Newport News, Virginia, U.S.
- Writing career
- Pen name: Erin Sterling
- Period: 2010–present
- Genres: Young adult fiction, romance, thriller

Rachel Hawkins (born November 23, 1979) is the author of Hex Hall, a best-selling trilogy of young adult paranormal romance novels. She is from Dothan, Alabama. She also writes as Erin Sterling.

== Biography ==
Hawkins was born in Newport News, Virginia, moved to Dothan, Alabama at a young age, graduated from Houston Academy in 1998, and received a degree in English literature from Auburn University in 2002. She began writing her first novel, Hex Hall, while working as an English teacher at Sparkman High School. As of 2021, Hawkins lives with her family in Auburn, Alabama.

== Bibliography ==
=== Young adult ===
==== Hex Hall ====
- Hex Hall (2010)
- Demonglass (2011)
- Spell Bound (2012)
- School Spirits (2013)
- Short story: "A Very Hexy Valentine's Day" (2013)

==== Rebel Belle trilogy ====
- Rebel Belle (2014)
- Miss Mayhem (2015)
- Lady Renegades (2016)

==== Royals Series ====
- Prince Charming (2018) (first published as Royals)
- Her Royal Highness (2019)

==== Short stories ====
- "Eyes in the Dark", Defy the Dark, ed. Saundra Mitchell (2013)
- "The Key", Grim, ed. Christine Johnson (2014)

=== Middle grade fiction ===
- Journey's End (2016)
- Ruby & Olivia (2017)

=== Adult fiction ===
==== Thrillers ====
- The Wife Upstairs (2021)
- Reckless Girls (2022)
- The Villa (2023)
- The Heiress (2024)
- The Storm (2026)

==== Graves Glen Series ====
- The Ex Hex (2021) (writing as Erin Sterling)
- The Kiss Curse (2022) (writing as Erin Sterling)
- The Wedding Witch (2024) (writing as Erin Sterling)

=== Audiobooks ===
- Beatrix Greene, Serial Box (2020) (writing with Ash Parsons and Vicky Alvear Shecter; first published as The Haunting of Beatrix Greene)
