= They Both Die at the End =

2017 young adult novel

- Author: Adam Silvera
- Language: English
- Genre: Young Adult • novel • science fiction
- Publisher: HarperTeen
- Publication date: September 5, 2017
- Publication place: United States
- Media type: Print (hardcover and paperback), e-book, audiobook
- Pages: 384
- ISBN: 9780062457790
- Followed by: The First to Die at the End

They Both Die at the End is a young adult novel written by American author Adam Silvera and published on September 5, 2017, by HarperTeen. It is Silvera's third novel and focuses on two teenage boys, Mateo and Rufus, who discover that they only have one day left to live.

In April 2020, due to #BookTok, a popular hashtag for readers on social media platform TikTok, the book's popularity saw a resurgence, once again placing it on The New York Times Best Seller list.

== Plot ==
Shortly after midnight on September 5, 2017, Mateo receives a phone call from Death-Cast, a company that can predict the deaths of individuals, informing him that he is a Decker, someone with only twenty-four hours (or less) left to live. The introverted Mateo decides to try to push himself to truly live and reluctantly downloads Last Friend, an app developed to help lonely Deckers find someone to spend their End Day with.

Rufus is in the middle of beating up Peck, his ex-girlfriend Aimee's new boyfriend, when he receives a call from Death-Cast. He allows Peck to leave so that he can return to his foster home to say his goodbyes. Rufus, Aimee, Malcolm and Tagoe, collectively known as The Plutos, hold a funeral for Rufus at his foster home. However, it is interrupted by Peck, who calls the police to have Rufus arrested for assault. Rufus flees and goes on the run, downloading Last Friend so that he won't live out his final day alone.

Mateo and Rufus meet through Last Friend and decide to spend the day accompanying each other. Rufus agrees to go with Mateo to the hospital so Mateo can visit his father, who has been in a coma for two weeks. Mateo says goodbye to his father and leaves him a note for him to read when he wakes up. Mateo and Rufus then go to see Lidia, Mateo's best friend, and her baby daughter. Not wanting to make Lidia upset, Mateo pretends everything is normal, but leaves her an envelope of cash before leaving and blocks her phone number.

Rufus receives a call from Aimee telling him that Malcolm and Tagoe were arrested when they attempted to hold off the police to give him more time to escape. Rufus and Mateo discuss the plans they had for their life. As their friendship deepens, Mateo becomes bolder and Rufus begins to take color photos for his Instagram page, as opposed to his usual monochrome posts, to signify his End Day. Rufus and Mateo barely manage to escape an explosion at a nearby gym. They then head to the cemetery so that Mateo can visit his mother's grave, only to find a groundskeeper is in the process of digging Mateo's grave beside hers. Mateo discusses the afterlife with Rufus, debating what will happen to them in the near future.

Rufus and Mateo go to The World Travel Arena for Deckers where they can experience dangerous activities without fear. Mateo asks Lidia to meet them there, and the three do some of the Decker activities at the center. Rufus receives a call from Malcolm and Tagoe, who were released from custody, and tells them to bring Aimee and meet him at a club for Deckers.

At the club, Mateo finally works up the courage to kiss Rufus. Rufus says goodbye to the Plutos and Mateo says goodbye to Lidia. Peck and his gang arrive at the club, having tracked Rufus using his Instagram posts, with a loaded gun. Aimee tries to talk him down, giving Mateo enough time to cause a commotion, making Peck drop the gun. Mateo and Rufus return to Mateo's apartment. They lie in bed and confess their love for one another, falling asleep together.

Mateo wakes up first and goes into the kitchen to make breakfast. He absentmindedly turns on the burner which he had told his neighbor not to fix earlier that day since he knew he would be dying. The burner explodes, and Rufus wakes up and flees the building. Mateo is declared dead at the scene and a devastated Rufus calls Lidia to inform her. Rufus visits Mateo's father in the hospital and tells the unconscious man all about their day. He leaves a note telling Mateo's father who Rufus was and to look at the photos of Rufus and Mateo on the Instagram account.

On his way to the park to spend his final hours, Rufus puts on his headphones to listen to the video he took of Mateo singing when they were in his room together and steps out into the road without looking, getting hit by a car.

== Silvera's early life/influences ==
In an interview, Adam Silvera, shared that he witnessed his mother undergo cardiac failure and this influenced his work to a certain extent. Silvera had a complicated childhood because he had to deal with his father walking out of his life and had a mother with a heart condition. In addition, being a queer Hispanic boy in higher education and his struggles with mental health disorders also influenced his work.

== Reception ==
They Both Die at the End is a New York Times and IndieBound best seller, as well as a Junior Library Guild selection.

The book received starred reviews from Booklist, Publishers Weekly, School Library Journal, and Kirkus Reviews, as well as positive reviews from The Bulletin of the Center for Children's Books, American Review, BookPage, Common Sense Media, BuzzFeed, Children's Book and Media Review, and Teen Vogue.

Booklist called the novel "extraordinary and unforgettable." Kirkus Reviews noted that the book was "another standout from Silvera who here grapples gracefully with heavy questions about death and the meaning of a life well-lived" before concluding that They Both Die at the End is "engrossing, contemplative and as heart-wrenching as the title promises".

BuzzFeed noted that "Adam Silvera not only poignantly captures the raw emotion of facing your own mortality but also creates entirely relatable and authentic characters you'll want to follow on their journey."

American Review stated that "this book is an important contribution to young adult literature because of its humanizing portrayals of queer, adolescent characters of color." They note this is especially important "given the repeatedly cited issues of hegemonic Whiteness and heteronormativity in young adult publishing, particularly in speculative fiction."

The audiobook, narrated by Michael Crouch, Robbie Daymond, and Bahni Turpin, received a favorable review from Booklist, who noted that the voice actors brought "the full range of this story’s anguish and joy to the listener. Crouch and Daymond, voicing Mateo and Rufus, respectively, emphasize how the characters change yet remain true to themselves."

BuzzFeed named They Both Die at the End one of the best young adult books of the decade. Kirkus Reviews, BookPage, School Library Journal, Amazon, and BuzzFeed named it one of the best young adult novels of 2017, and Book Riot named it one of the best queer books of the year.

They Both Die at the End has also been analyzed in academic journals for its depiction of LGBT teens of color.

=== Accolades ===
Year	Accolade	Result	Ref.
2017	Amazon Best Young Adult Books of the Year	Selection	
2017	Booklist Editors' Choice: Books for Youth	Selection	
2017	BookPage Teen Top Pick of September	Selection	
2017	Book Riot's Best Queer Books of the Year	Selection	
2017	BuzzFeed Best Young Adult Books of the Year	Selection	
2017	Goodreads Choice Award for Young Adult Fiction	Nominee	
2017	Junior Library Guild selection	Selection	
2017	Kirkus Reviews' Best Young Adult Books of the Year	Selection	
2017	Los Angeles Public Library Best Teen Books of the Year	Selection	
2017	Paste Best Young Adult Books of the Year	Selection	
2017	School Library Journal’s Best Young Adult Books of the Year	Selection	
2018	American Library Association's (ALA) Best Fiction for Young Adults	Selection	
2018	American Library Association Rainbow List	Top 10	
2018	Capitol Choices for Fourteen and Up	Selection	
2018	Young Adults’ Choices Reading List	Selection	
2019	BuzzFeed's Best Young Adult Books of the Decade	Selection	
2020	ALA Quick Picks for Reluctant Young Adult Readers	Selection	
2021	Flicker Tale Children's Book Award for Older Readers	Winner	

== Adaptation ==
They Both Die at the End is in development by eOne with Bridgerton creator Chris Van Dusen attached to executive produce and write alongside author Silvera. Previously, the adaptation was set as a half-hour television miniseries at HBO with J. J. Abrams executive producing.

In January 2023, Netflix picked up the series with Van Dusen, Bad Bunny and Drew Comins executive producing.

== Prequel ==
The prequel novel The First to Die at the End gives an introduction to the Death-Cast system and introduces the reader to a set of new star-crossed lovers. It was released on October 4, 2022.

== Sequels ==
The third installment of the series is a sequel, The Survivor Wants to Die at the End, released on May 6, 2025. The fourth installment, No One Knows Who Dies at the End was planned for release in 2026.
