= Alan Dale (critic) =

British theatre critic, playwright and book author

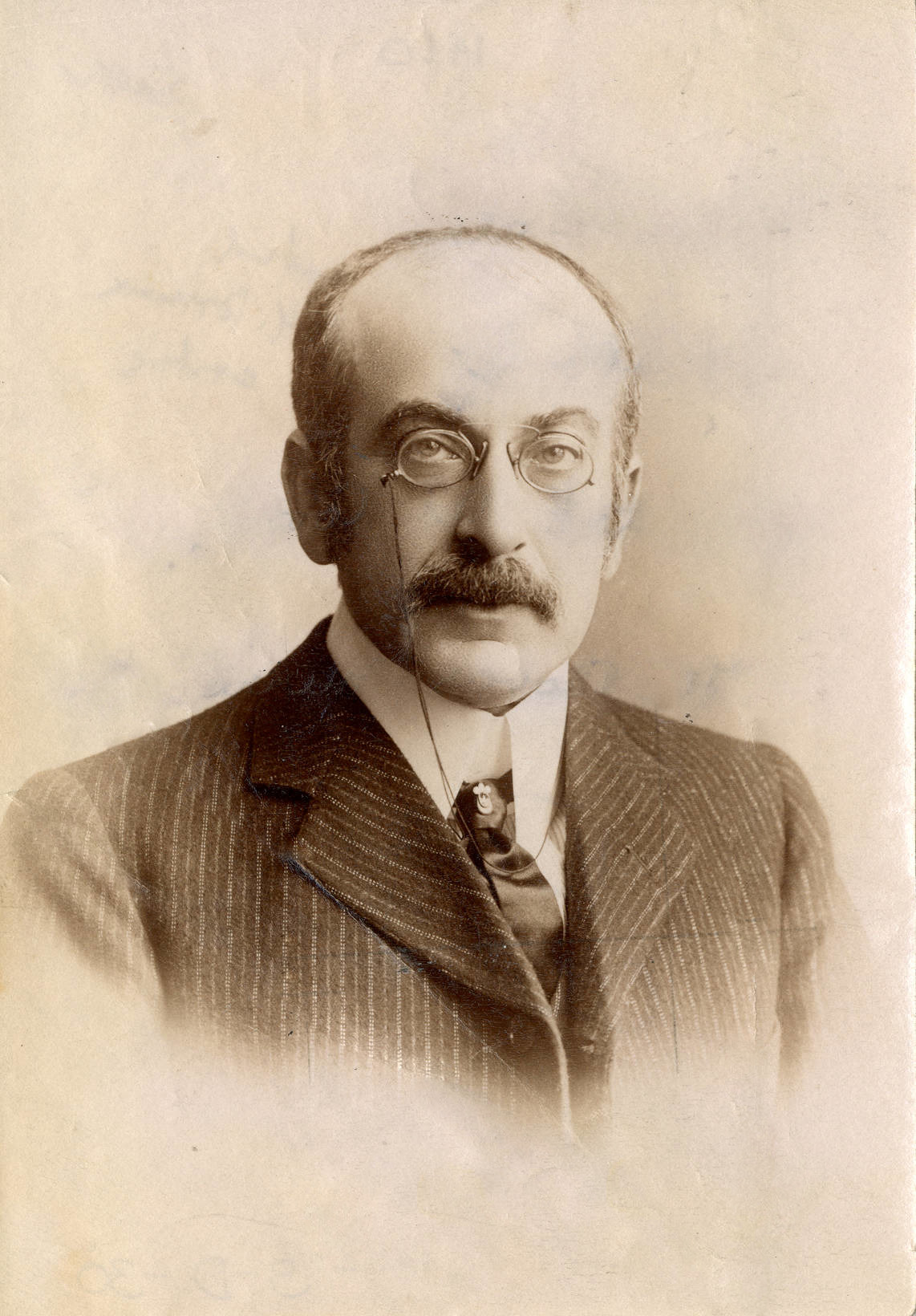
- Dale c. 1910
- Born: Alfred J. Cohen; May 14, 1861; Birmingham, England
- Died: May 21, 1928 (aged 67) on train en route from Plymouth to Birmingham England
- Occupations: critic, author,Theatre criticism
- Years active: 1880s-1928
- Spouse: Carrie L. Frost

Alan Dale (May 14, 1861 - May 21, 1928) was an influential British theatre critic, playwright and book author of the late Victorian and early 20th Century eras. He was born Alfred J. Cohen in Birmingham England. He arrived in New York in 1887 and became a drama critic for several New York papers i.e., New York Evening World, New York Journal and the New York American. His reviews of plays were often negative but helped sell a lot of William Randolph Hearst's newspapers. The theatre world despised Dale for his acid reviews.

His spouse was Carrie Livingston Frost and they had at least two daughters Marjorie R. (Dale) Cohen Knilling and Daisy Dale Cohen Orr.

Dale died aboard a train while traveling from Plymouth to Birmingham. He had previously undergone several operations after health problems.

== Selected bibliography ==
=== Novels ===
- Jonathan's Home (1885)
- Ned Bachman, the New Orleans Detective (1887)
- A Marriage Below Zero (1889)
- An Eerie He and She (1889)
- An Old Maid Kindled (1890)
- Miss Innocence (1890)
- Conscience on Ice: a story of the stage (1892)
- My Footlight Husband: a story of the stage (1893)
- A Moral Busybody: an episode of New York's today (1894)
- His Own Image: a novel (1899)
- A Girl Who Wrote (1902)
- Wanted, a Cook: domestic dialogues (1904)
- The Great Wet Way (1909)

== Other works ==
- Familiar Chats with Queens of the Stage (1880)
