= More Happy Than Not =

2015 young adult novel by Adam Silvera

- Author: Adam Silvera
- Cover artist: Janine Agro and Liz Casal
- Language: English
- Genre: Young adult novel
- Publisher: Soho Teen
- Publication date: June 2, 2015
- ISBN: 9781616955601

More Happy Than Not is the debut novel by American author Adam Silvera, published June 2, 2015 by Soho Teen.

The book is a New York Times best seller, was shortlisted for the Lambda Literary Award for Children's and Young Adult Literature, and has been included on many "best of" lists.

== Plot ==
Aaron Soto is a 16-year-old living in the Bronx with his mother and brother. His father died by suicide in the house three months ago. Aaron's ensuing depression caused him to attempt suicide as well, leaving him with a scar on his wrist in the shape of a smile. He maintains his happiness with his girlfriend Genevieve and his other friends in his project, promising himself to not make the same mistake again.

Aaron meets Thomas, a kid from a different project, and becomes friends with him due to his idealist and carefree personality. When Genevieve leaves for three weeks on an artist's retreat, their friendship deepens. Aaron suspects that Thomas is gay, and realizes that he had developed feelings for him as well. Aaron breaks up with Genevieve, and his old friends attack Thomas out of jealousy of Aaron's new friendship. Later that night he admits his feelings for Thomas, but Thomas rejects him, telling Aaron he's straight.

Distraught over losing his best friend, girlfriend, and old friends, Aaron turns to the Leteo Institute — an organization that uses neurosurgery to erase traumatic memories in their patients — to solve his problems. He figures that if he forgets that he is gay by erasing all his memories of Thomas, he'll have his old relationships back and be happy again. Before he does so, Thomas comes back and apologizes for reacting so harshly, though he states that he is straight and a romantic relationship between them isn't possible. Aaron's old friends overhear their conversation and physically assault Aaron for being gay.

A blow to his head from the attack causes his memories to be "unwound"; It is revealed that Aaron had already gone to the Leteo Institute before. He remembers memories that had been repressed: he secretly dated a classmate Collin while he was in a relationship with Genevieve. When he came out to his father, he kicked Aaron out of the house and killed himself in the bathtub. Aaron sought to confirm his relationship with Collin, but Collin drew back, due to his girlfriend getting pregnant. Devastated, Aaron decided to erase his memories of Collin so that he could be fully happy with his relationship with Genevieve.

Aaron recovers from the attack and the reappearance of the memories. He considers taking another Leteo procedure to forget the painful memories, but Thomas convinces him not to. Unfortunately, Aaron learns that he is developing anterograde amnesia as a side effect of the procedure. Before he fully loses his ability to create new memories, he sets out to gain closure in his relationships. He forgives Collin, Genevieve, and Thomas. Thomas pushes Aaron to focus on being "more happy than not" despite the hardships in his life. As Aaron waits for a cure to his amnesia, he promises to always try to find the happiness in the memories he remembers.

== Reception ==
More Happy Than Not is a New York Times best seller and a Junior Library Guild selection.

The book received starred reviews from Kirkus Reviews, School Library Journal, Publishers Weekly, and Booklist, as well as positive reviews from English Journal, The Bulletin of the Center for Children's Books, and The New York Times.

The New York Times's Gina Bellafonte applauded how Silvera "manages a delicate knitting of class politics through an ambitious narrative about sexual identity and connection that considers the heavy weight and constructive value of traumatic memory, as well."

Beyond popular media, More Happy Than Not has been discussed in academic journals, including English Journal, The Lancet, Children's Literature, Oregon Library Association Quarterly, The Clearing House, and Research on Diversity in Youth Literature. It was also analyzed in two chapters from Engaging with Multicultural YA Literature in the Secondary Classroom.

Accolades for More Happy Than Not
Year	Accolade	Result	Ref.
2015	Booklist Editors' Choice: Books for Youth	Selection	
2015	Booklist's Best First Novels for Youth	Top 10	
2015	Bustle's "25 Best YA Books Of 2015"	Selection	
2015	Goodreads Choice Award for Young Adult Fiction	Nominee	
2015	Kirkus Reviews' Best Young Adult Books of 2015	Selection	
2015	New York Public Library's Best Books for Teens	Top 10	
2015	New York Times Editors' Choice	Selection	
2015	Paste's Best Young Adult Books of the Year	Selection	
2015	School Library Journal's Best Books: Young Adult	Selection	
2016	Best Fiction for Young Adults	Top 10	
2016	CBC Children’ Choice Book Awards: Teen Choice Debut Author	Finalist	
2016	Cooperative Children's Book Center Choices: Fiction for Young Adults	Selection	
2016	Indies Choice Book of the Year, Young Adult	Selection	
2016	Lambda Literary Award for Children's and Young Adult Literature	Shortlist	
2016	Paste's Best Young Adult Books of All Time	Selection	
2017	Popular Paperbacks for Young Adults	Selection	
2017	Rainbow Project Book List	Selection	
