= Leah on the Offbeat =

2018 young adult novel by Becky Albertalli

- First edition cover
- Author: Becky Albertalli
- Language: English
- Genre: Young Adult, Romance, Drama, LGBT, Coming Of Age
- Publisher: Balzer & Bray, HarperCollins, Penguin
- Publication date: April 24, 2018
- Publication place: United States
- Media type: Print (hardcover and paperback), e-book, audiobook
- Pages: 368
- ISBN: 978-0241331057
- Preceded by: Simon vs. the Homo Sapiens Agenda
- Followed by: Love, Creekwood

Leah on the Offbeat is a 2018 young adult novel by American author Becky Albertalli. It is the direct sequel to her 2015 debut novel Simon vs. the Homo Sapiens Agenda and the third novel in the "Simonverse", the shared universe in which Albertalli's books take place and which also includes 2017's The Upside of Unrequited. The audiobook was read by actress Shannon Purser.

Leah on the Offbeat focuses on Leah, the best friend of Simon Spier, and her attempts to deal with various personal issues including friendships and relationships, body image, sexuality, self-esteem, going to college and feeling like an outsider. Leah was portrayed by Australian actress Katherine Langford in Love, Simon, the 2018 film adaptation of Simon vs. the Homo Sapiens Agenda.

== Synopsis ==
Leah Burke is a drummer, usually on the beat drumming in the band Emoji. However, Leah has kept something from all of her friends, even from her openly gay best friend, Simon: she is bisexual. The only person to know about her sexuality is her mother, whom Leah is very close to. When her friend group starts to rock, Leah doesn't know what to do, with prom and graduation coming up. In between her friends fighting and graduation, Leah then realizes she might like one of her friends more than she first thought.

== Characters ==
- Leah Burke – The young protagonist of the novel who is the drummer in the band Emoji. She has a deadpan, sarcastic sense of humor and is known to bottle up her feelings. She is very insecure and struggling to deal with her bisexuality.
- Simon Spier – Leah's gay best friend with whom she was secretly in love when they were younger. He is supportive, enjoys Oreos, musical theatre, Elliott Smith and Bram Greenfeld, his boyfriend.
- Nick Eisner – A talented singer, guitarist and soccer player and one of Leah's best friends. Towards the end of Simon, Nick began a relationship with Abby, much to Leah's annoyance.
- Abby Suso – Nick's girlfriend and one of Simon's closest friends. Leah develops a serious crush on Abby, later becoming her girlfriend.
- Bram Greenfeld – Simon's boyfriend. A quiet, polite, cute, soccer player.
- Garrett Laughlin – Bram's best friend and a member of the soccer team with Bram and Nick. Garrett has a crush on Leah and is a part of her larger circle of friends.
- Morgan – One of Leah's friends and the keyboardist in Emoji. She is Jewish and the events that occurred at her bat mitzvah are frequently mentioned by the other characters. In the novel, Morgan insinuates that Abby only got into Georgia State because she's black. The comment causes Leah's group to fracture.
- Anna – One of Leah's friends and the bassist in Emoji. She is Chinese-American, wears black eyeliner, and reads manga.
- Nora Spier – Simon's younger sister and the guitarist in Emoji. Nora is not very assertive but described by Simon as "under the radar cool".
- Taylor Metternich – Leah's self-obsessed, pretentious classmate and lead singer of Emoji.
- Cal Price – One of Leah's classmates and the stage manager of the school's theatre production of Joseph and the Technicolor Dreamcoat.
- Martin Addison – One of Leah's classmates who is universally disliked by the majority of the characters because he blackmailed and later outed Simon.
- Jessica Keane – Leah's mother. A lawyer to whom Leah is very close. Leah tells her everything, including the fact that she is bisexual.
- Wells – Jessica's new boyfriend. Leah dislikes him because he is older, and says things like "oh fudge".
- Caitlin – Abby's cousin's girlfriend's friend's sister, who lets Abby and Leah stay in her apartment during their college tour.

== Critical reception ==
Leah on the Offbeat received positive reviews. Booklist noted that Albertalli "has a fantastic ear for voice, and it’s beautifully on display in Leah’s funny, wry, and vulnerable first-person narrative." The entertainment site Hypable praised the story, Leah's characterization, and "a voice to another wave of LGBTQ+ youth". Bustle praised the story as well as depiction of social anxiety.

Albertalli won the Goodreads Choice Award for Best Young Adult Fiction in 2018 for Leah on the Offbeat. Leah on the Offbeat was included on the American Library Association's 2019 Rainbow Book List. It was a #1 New York Times best seller upon publication.

== Book banning controversy ==
The book was permanently banned from libraries and classrooms in Clay County School District, Florida, and temporarily banned (pending investigation) in Escambia County Public Schools, Florida, and Beaufort County School District, South Carolina.
