= Mixed-orientation marriage =

Marriage between partners of differing sexual orientations

A mixed-orientation marriage is a marriage between partners of differing sexual orientations. The broader term is mixed-orientation relationship, sometimes shortened to MOR or MORE (while mixed-orientation marriage is sometimes shortened as MOM).

The people involved in such a marriage may not be romantically or sexually compatible, for example if the marriage is between a straight man and a lesbian. The term also applies when one of the partners involved is asexual or aromantic, leading to a mixed desire for sexual activity or romantic connection.

The most visible and researched subset of mixed-orientation relationships is mixed-orientation marriages in which one spouse is straight and the other experiences same-sex attraction, but there is a much broader diversity of mixed-orientation relationships. A 2016 research review noted that "further research on MOREs that looks beyond the traditional viewpoint of MOMs is needed in order to better understand the particular challenges, as well as the unique resiliency factors, seen within these non-traditional relationships."

== Asexual–sexual marriage ==
In a marriage between an asexual person and an allosexual person (someone who experiences sexual attraction), the asexual partner does not experience sexual desire or attraction. These marriages are often based on romantic love; however, they may experience challenges around sexual relations. The word "compromise" is used by the Asexual Visibility and Education Network community to label the act of an asexual person consenting to have sex with their partner for their partner's benefit. Some marriages in which one partner is asexual are sexless marriages; other such marriages are polyamorous.

== Marriages in which one partner is bisexual ==
A major challenge to relationships in which one partner is bisexual is negative stereotypes about bisexual people. Due to bisexual erasure, bisexual people in relationships with heterosexual persons are frequently falsely perceived as being heterosexual, and relationships in which a bisexual person is married to a gay or lesbian person are usually falsely perceived as gay or lesbian relationships. In addition, bisexual people are incorrectly stereotyped as promiscuous, confused or going through a phase, and incapable of monogamy.

Research has shown that although bisexual people are, in general, more open to non-monogamy than gay, lesbian, and straight people are, bisexual people are just as likely as non-bisexual people to be in long-term monogamous relationships.

In 2020, researchers Kristen Mark, Laura Vowels, and Amanda Bunting published the results of a study on relationship satisfaction in 142 mixed-sex couples in which one partner identified as bisexual. They found that greater sexual and relationship satisfaction was experienced by couples who acknowledged bisexual identity and addressed issues surrounding it. Those who were out as bisexual to their friends and religious communities experienced more satisfaction in their relationships, but outness to other family members negatively impacted the satisfaction of the straight partner. The researchers theorized that "this might be due to the negativity that the straight partner may experience from their family" due to negative stereotypes about bisexual people.

== Marriage between homosexual and heterosexual partners ==
Societal or religious pressure to be heterosexual and to marry someone of a different sex can lead people to enter into relationships and marriages even if they do not identify as straight or are not sure if they are. Some people cite spiritual reasons for getting married. Early research by Michael M. Ross in the 1970s and 1980s on gay men who married women found that their reasons most often had to do with social expectancy, as a defense against being perceived as gay, or due to internalized homophobia.

In 2002, a study was conducted in Australia on 26 gay men who had previously been married to women, and found that 50% thought they were gay before they married and 85% identified as gay after their marriage. The study found that the most common reasons these men got married were that it "seemed natural" (cited by 65.4%) and that they "wanted children and family life" (cited by 65.4%).

Joe Kort, a counselor specializing in mixed-orientation marriages, has noted that often, men who later come out as gay "genuinely love their wives. They fall in love with their wives, they have children, they're on a chemical, romantic high, and then after about seven years, the high falls away and their gay identity starts emerging. They don't mean any harm." Some hide their orientation from their spouse, while others tell their spouse before marriage. Some people identify as exclusively heterosexual in behavior and fantasies before marriage, but grow toward a more homosexual orientation during marriage.

A 2008 study on men who have sex with men while married to women found that such men do so for a variety of reasons and do not always consider themselves to be gay; for some, "their heterosexual interests and behaviors remain primary." Of the 201 men in the study, 9 identified as heterosexual, 77 as bisexual, and 115 as homosexual.

A lesser-known but growing aspect of this category is couples where one of the partners is transgender and transitions during the relationship.

== Lavender marriage ==
A mixed-orientation marriage of convenience can serve to conceal one or both partners' sexual orientation, sometimes for purposes of maintaining or advancing their career, especially a highly public career. Such cases are sometimes called lavender marriages in popular writing. "Beard" is a slang term for a person who knowingly or unknowingly helps conceal someone's sexual orientation in this manner.

== Supports for those in mixed-orientation marriages ==
In the wake of the 2005 film Brokeback Mountain, which features two cowboys who are married to women and fall in love with each other, a 2006 New York Times article reported that "although precise numbers are impossible to come by, 10,000 to 20,000 wives of gay husbands have contacted online support groups, and increasing numbers of them are women in their 20s or 30s."

OurPath (previously the Straight Spouse Network), a volunteer-run peer-to-peer support organization for straight people in mixed-orientation marriages, has more than 50 local support groups in the United States and affiliated support groups in Canada, Australia, India, and Britain. OurPath responds to an average of 145 new support requests each month.

Husbands Out to Wives (HOW) is an online world-wide support group for married gay or bisexual men who have (or intend to) come out to their wives. HOW is a secure, confidential site accessed only through a vetting process. Men who are a gay, bisexual or otherwise LGBTQ-identifying husband of a woman, out to or committed to coming out to her, can join HOW by contacting how-support.org/ using a confidential email address, for further details about the group and instructions for joining.

Amity Pierce Buxton, a partner to HOW in its early years, and a long-time advocate for partners in mixed-orientation marriages and an early researcher in this area, noted that "peers provide the most support, while therapists are often unfamiliar with sexual orientation, mixed orientation couples, or societal attitudes that impact mixed orientation families."

== In media ==
The theme of mixed-orientation marriages in literature dates back at least to 1889 with the publication of A Marriage Below Zero by Alfred J. Cohen (writing under the pseudonym Chester Allan Dale). Cohen's heterosexual female narrator was married to a homosexual man. Cohen believed that women should be aware of the sexual orientation of a potential husband so they would avoid marrying a homosexual man. Lesbian pulp fiction sometimes included women who were married to men exploring their attraction to other women. Other examples of the theme include the book Brokeback Mountain by Annie Proulx, later a feature film, which features two married cowboys who fall in love with each other.

Brokeback Mountain helped bring the issue of mixed-orientation marriages to public attention, but several other movies had already dealt with the issue. Talk shows, such as Oprah, have also addressed mixed-orientation marriages, as did TLC's controversial 2015 reality show My Husband's Not Gay, which was about gay Mormon men married to women. Some of the movies and TV shows that feature mixed-orientation marriages include:

- The film Brokeback Mountain is about two cowboys, both married to women, who fall in love with each other.
- In the film Crustacés et Coquillages a married man (re)discovers his suppressed homosexual desires while spending his summer holidays with his wife and his two children.
- The film De-Lovely is about Cole Porter, a gay man, and his wife, Linda Lee Thomas.
- The film Far From Heaven is about a woman whose husband has an affair with another man.
- In the film Imagine Me & You a straight woman falls in love with a lesbian at her wedding.
- In the film Mulligans a gay man spends the summer with his best friend's family and begins an affair with the father.
- In the film The Wedding Banquet a gay Taiwanese immigrant man marries a mainland Chinese woman to placate his parents and get her a green card.
- The 1996 episode of The Simpsons titled "A Fish Called Selma" parodies the notion of a lavender marriage. Troy McClure marries Selma Bouvier to conceal his unusual sexual desire for fish/aquatic animals.
- In the television show Degrassi: The Next Generation, the character Ashley Kerwin was raised by parents in a lavender marriage.
- In the Japanese manga series and film Love My Life, the main character's parents have been in a lavender marriage for the purposes of silencing their relatives and becoming parents.
- In the television show Samantha Who? (2007–2009), the character Andrea Belladonna agrees to marry gay basketball player Tony Dane.
- The Playboy Club, a 2011 television series on NBC, includes the marriage of a lesbian and a gay man who are members of the Chicago chapter of the Mattachine Society.
- In James Frey's 2008 novel Bright Shiny Morning, the homosexual actor Amberton Parker and lesbian actress Casey Parker wed to conceal their sexual orientations.
- On the YouTube independent animated series Helluva Boss (2020-), Moxxie, a bisexual male, is married to Millie, a straight female.
- In the 2023 mini-series Fellow Travelers, also based on the 2007 novel by Thomas Mallon, a DC State Department official marries a woman to hide from the Lavender Scare, keep his position in government, and the DC elite.

== See also ==
- He never married
- Heterosexual relationships among LGBT people
- Lavender marriage
- Medieval singlewomen
- Side A, Side B, Side X, Side Y (theological views)
