= The Walker =

- Theatrical poster
- Directed by: Paul Schrader
- Written by: Paul Schrader
- Produced by: Deepak Nayar
- Starring: Woody Harrelson; Kristin Scott Thomas; Lauren Bacall; Ned Beatty; Moritz Bleibtreu; Mary Beth Hurt; Lily Tomlin
- Cinematography: Chris Seager
- Edited by: Julian Rodd
- Music by: Anne Dudley
- Production companies: Kintop Pictures; Ingenious Film Partners; Isle of Man Film
- Distributed by: THINKFilm (United States); Pathé Distribution (United Kingdom)
- Release dates: 13 February 2007 (Berlin International Film Festival); 10 August 2007 (United Kingdom); 7 December 2007 (United States)
- Running time: 107 minutes
- Countries: United States; United Kingdom
- Language: English
- Budget: $10 million
- Box office: $590,416

The Walker is a 2007 independent crime drama film written and directed by Paul Schrader and starring Woody Harrelson, Kristin Scott Thomas, Lauren Bacall, Ned Beatty, Lily Tomlin, Willem Dafoe, Moritz Bleibtreu and Mary Beth Hurt. It is the fourth installment in Schrader's night workers series of films, starting with Taxi Driver in 1976, followed by American Gigolo in 1980 and Light Sleeper in 1992.

== Synopsis ==
A middle-aged gay man in Washington, D. C., Carter Page III, is a male escort—a "walker"—a single man who escorts other men's wives to social events, rather than their husbands. One of the women he escorts, Lynn Lockner, is married to a United States senator and is having an affair with a lobbyist. When the lobbyist is murdered, she embroils Carter in an investigation that leads to the highest levels of the federal government.

== Cast ==
- Woody Harrelson as Carter Page III
- Kristin Scott Thomas as Lynn Lockner
- Lauren Bacall as Natalie Van Miter
- Ned Beatty as Jack Delorean
- Moritz Bleibtreu as Emek Yoglu
- Mary Beth Hurt as Chrissie Morgan
- Lily Tomlin as Abigail Delorean
- Willem Dafoe as Senator Larry Lockner
- William Hope as Mungo Tenant

== Production ==
Schrader completed the script in 2002. Initially the film was to be a direct sequel to American Gigolo, with Julian Kaye (played by Richard Gere) as the lead character. The director originally wanted Kevin Kline to play the lead.

Years later, Schrader would lament the film on his Facebook page as "the most distressing failure" of his career. He also said that the film was miscast and that he wanted openly gay actor Rupert Everett as the lead.

The Page character was based on Jerry Zipkin, for whom the term "walker" was coined.

== Critical reception ==
The film received positive reviews in its premiere run in the Berlin, Sydney, and Cambridge film festivals. The Walker was released direct-to-DVD but played in an independent film theater for two weeks in Dorris, California. The film received mixed reviews from critics. On the review aggregator Rotten Tomatoes, the film holds a 52% approval rating, based on 63 reviews with an average score of 5.3/10. On Metacritic, the film had an average score of 51 out of 100, based on 26 reviews indicating "mixed or average reviews".
