= Mixed-orientation marriage and the LDS Church =

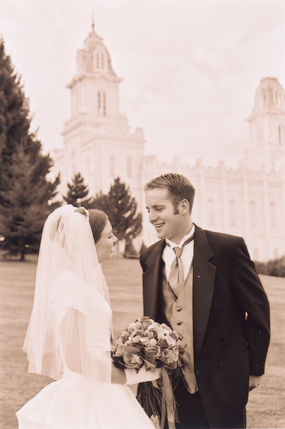
A couple in front of an LDS temple following their temple sealing marriage ceremony. LDS leaders have stated that opposite-sex marriage should not be viewed as a therapeutic step for members physically attracted to those of the same sex.

Because all homosexual sexual activity is condemned as sinful by the Church of Jesus Christ of Latter-day Saints (LDS Church) in its law of chastity, and the church teaches that God does not approve of same-sex marriage, many LGBTQ members of the LDS Church have felt that they should marry someone of the opposite sex. According to LDS historian Greg Prince, for decades church leaders counseled many men to be sealed to a woman with the promise this would "cure" their homosexuality, and the overall track record of these mixed-orientation marriages (MOMs) has "generally been dismal, often catastrophic, and sometimes lethal" despite the best intentions.

The church's 2012 website acknowledged by implication that past leaders' advice for individuals attracted to the same-sex to marry someone of the opposite sex may have been erroneous. Leaders have said that homosexual attractions will not continue past death, and that those who don't have an opportunity to be married in this life will in the afterlife.

== Background ==
All homosexual sexual activity is condemned as sinful by the church, and it teaches that God does not approve of same-sex marriage. Adherents who participate in same-sex sexual behavior may face church discipline. Members of the church who experience homosexual attractions, including those who self-identify as gay, lesbian, or bisexual remain in good standing in the church if they abstain from same-sex marriage and any homosexual sexual activity or sexual relationships outside an opposite-sex marriage. However, all people, including those in same-sex relationships and marriages, are permitted to attend the weekly Sunday meetings.

=== Plan of Salvation ===
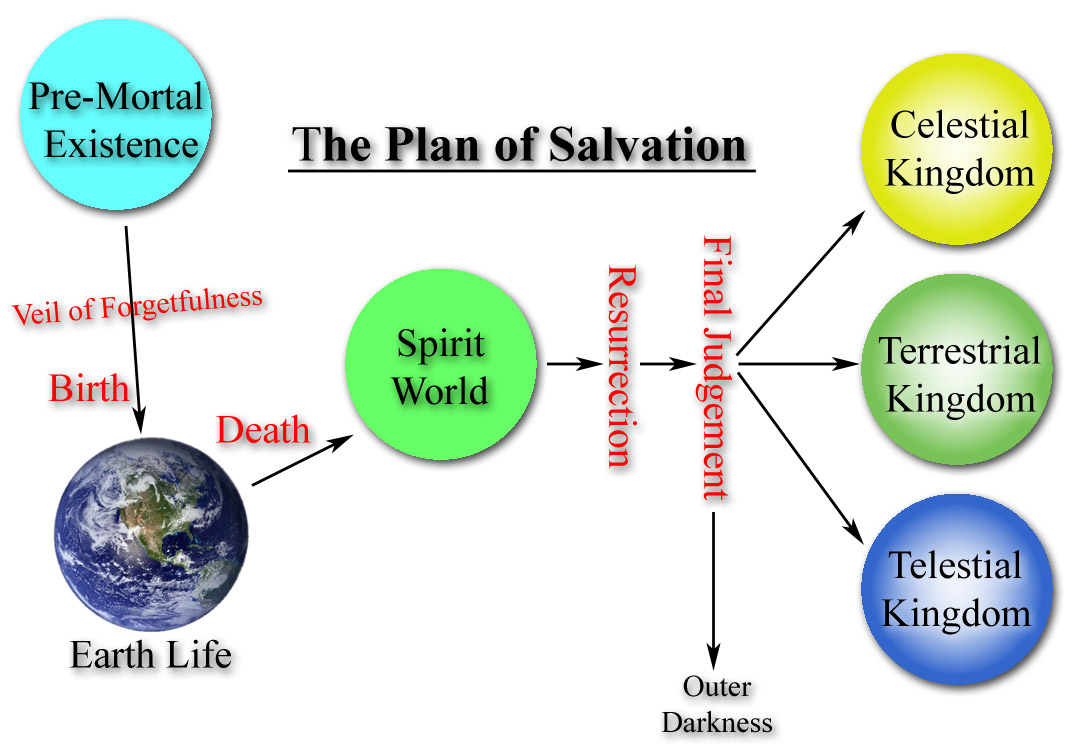
A diagrammed timeline of humanity according to LDS teachings called the plan of salvation showing potential destinations on the right side after death.

In the church's plan of salvation noncelibate gay and lesbian individuals will not be allowed in the top tier of heaven to receive exaltation unless they repent during mortality, and a heterosexual marriage is a requirement for exaltation. The LDS Church has campaigned against government recognition of same-sex marriage, and the topic of same-sex marriage has been one of the church's foremost public concerns since 1993. These current teachings and policies leave homosexual members with the options of attempting a mixed-orientation opposite-sex marriage, or living a lifetime of celibacy without any sexual expression.

In the church's plan of salvation noncelibate gay and lesbian individuals will not be allowed in the top tier of heaven to receive what's called exaltation to become like God unless they repent, and a heterosexual marriage is a requirement. Author Charlotte Scholl Shurtz stated that the focus on Heavenly Parents as a cisgender, heterosexual couple enshrines heteronormativity and teaches that heterosexuality is an essential prerequisite to godhood. She further said that current teachings deny exaltation and godhood for LGBTQ+ people unless they eternally perform a cisgender, heterosexual relationship after death.

== Prevalence ==
Evergreen director David Pruden was quoted as stating in 2002 that 40% of the approximately 150 callers requesting help each month on their hotline were Mormon men married to women, and distressed about their homosexual attractions. Additionally, a 2004 publication quoted Family Services statistics which showed that about half of the approximately 400 gay Mormon men they had seen as clients for over a year during the past 30 years were married, though only half of those were able to stay married.

The church teaches that heterosexual marriage is one of several requirements for afterlife entry into the "highest degree of glory" in the celestial kingdom. Church leaders previously encouraged this, with one former church employee stating in 1986 that he had experienced pressure to marry at the age of 24 in the belief that it would change his homosexual feelings, later resulting in a divorce. Artist Trevor Southey stated that he was counseled by the church to marry a woman in an attempt to reorient his sexuality, and the marriage ultimately failed.

=== Publicized instances ===
Several LDS individuals have been reported as being in an MOM. These include Ty Mansfield, and the late church patriarch Joseph Fielding Smith. LDS-raised individuals who later divorced from an MOM include Josh Weed, Bruce Bastian, Devon Gibby, Carol Lynn Pearson, Dave Matheson, and Connell O'Donovan. Deceased LDS-raised individuals who divorced from an MOM include D. Michael Quinn, Ada Dwyer Russell, and Mildred J. Berryman. LDS members in MOMs have received media coverage like in the reality television show My Husband's Not Gay, and the documentary series Mormon No More. A fictional depiction occurs in the play Angels in America.

== Changes in teachings ==
In 2012 an official church website stated church leaders no longer necessarily advise opposite-sex marriage to those attracted to the same sex. The first high-ranking LDS leaders to publicly speak out against mixed-orientation marriages was Gordon Hinckley in 1987 when he stated that "marriage should not be viewed as a therapeutic step to solve problems such as homosexual inclinations or practices ...." Church publications now warn local congregation leaders that encouraging members to attempt to cultivate heterosexual feelings generally leads to frustration and discouragement. Previously, the church had taught that it was possible to overcome same-sex feelings, and that heterosexual feelings can emerge once an individual ceases any same-sex sexual activity, making a heterosexual marriage possible.

Oaks stated in 2007 that marriages should not be entered under false pretenses, but also stated a heterosexual marriage would be appropriate for a man attracted to men who had "shown their ability to deal with these feelings or inclinations and put them in the background, and feel a great attraction for a daughter of God". The most recent statement by a general church leader as of 2015 was when the apostle Oaks stated that leaders no longer recommend marriage as a solution for same-gender feelings. Another recent mention is in the church website on homosexuality which features a gay man married to a straight woman.

Changes in teachings on dating & marriage for LGBTQ members
| Topic | Earlier teachings | Current teachings |
|---|---|---|
| Heterosexual dating and marriage | As a therapeutic step to overcome homosexuality | Not to be seen as a therapy or solution |

== Research on views and outcomes ==
Several surveys have been done on the topic of LGBT Mormons and opposite-sex marriages. A 1997 study by members of the BYU Family Studies Department found that of over 200 single LDS women of diverse ages polled, 33% would be willing to seriously date and consider marriage with a hypothetical LDS college grad who had been sexually active with other men 3 years ago. A 2015 study found that 51% of the 1,612 LGBT Mormon respondents who had entered a mixed-orientation marriage ended up divorcing,

The study projected that 69% of all these marriages would ultimately end in divorce. The study also found that engaging in mixed-orientation marriages and involvement in the LDS Church were correlated with higher rates of depression and a lower quality of life for LGBT people. In 2007 during a panel held in a church headquarters building, several gay LDS members reported that they were able to maintain their heterosexual marriage.

== See also ==
- LGBTQ people and the Community of Christ
- Timeline of LGBT Mormon history
- LGBT Mormon people and organizations
- Gender minorities and the LDS Church
- BYU LGBT history
- LGBT rights in Utah
- List of Christian denominational positions on homosexuality
- Brothers Road - Group founded by LDS men in MOMs
- Evergreen - LDS Church's now defunct group which supported men in MOMs
- North Star - LDS support group with prominent members in MOMs
