= Cross-sex relationships involving LGBTQ people =

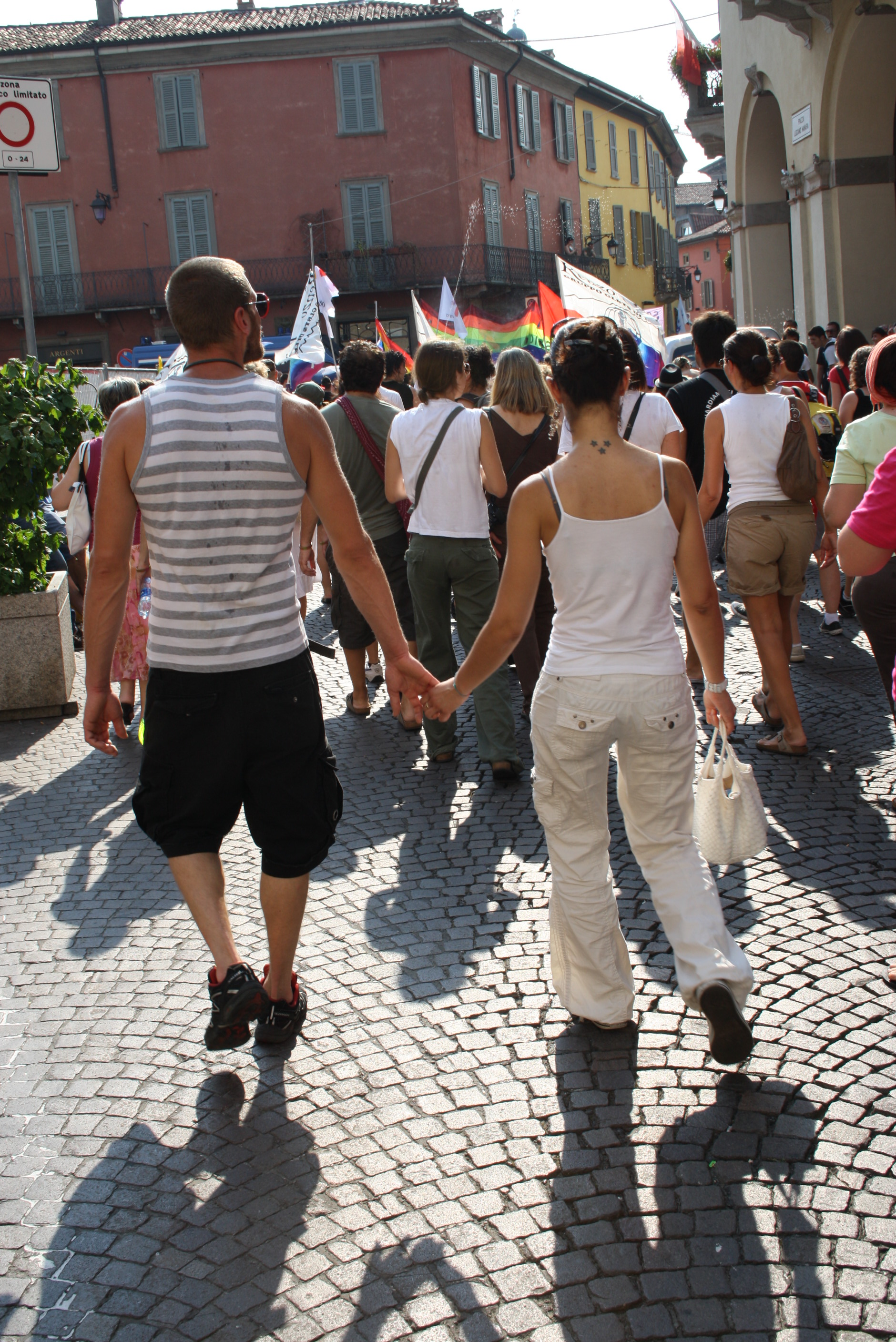
Mixed-gender couple at Treviglio Pride 2010

While LGBT people are often defined by society for their lack of heterosexual relationships, heterosexual relationships among them are fairly common, especially among bisexual people, who are attracted to multiple genders. Transgender people, who can be any sexual orientation, often enter heterosexual relationships as well.

== Statistics ==
A 2013 survey of LGBT Americans by the Pew Research Center found that 40% of all LGB Americans in committed relationships are in a heterosexual relationship. This includes 84% of bisexuals, 2% of gay men, and 1% of lesbians.

== Differences with non-LGBT heterosexual relationships ==
LGBT people in heterosexual relationships will often continue to follow some customs from queer relationships and queer culture. For example, LGBTQ people in these relationships may continue to use terms like top and bottom.

== Types ==
The following elements are included in such relationships

- Beards and mixed-orientation marriages
  - Lavender marriages
- Male-female bisexual couples
- Cis-trans heterosexual couples
- "T4T" relationships between trans males and trans females
- Asexual people who feel non-sexual romantic love for individuals of a different sex
- Other queer-identifying individuals in heterosexual relationships.

== See also ==
- Mixed-orientation marriage
- Bisexuality
- Asexuality
- Transgender sexuality
