= Love, Creekwood =

2020 novella by Becky Albertalli

- Author: Becky Albertalli
- Cover artist: Chris Bilheimer
- Language: English
- Genre: Young adult; LGBT; Coming of age
- Publisher: Balzer & Bray, HarperCollins, Penguin
- Publication date: June 30, 2020
- Publication place: United States
- Media type: Print (hardcover and paperback), e-book, audiobook
- Pages: 128
- ISBN: 0063048124
- Preceded by: Leah on the Offbeat

Love, Creekwood is a young adult novella by American author Becky Albertalli, released on June 30, 2020. The book follows Leah on the Offbeat (2018), and serves as an epilogue to it and Simon vs. the Homo Sapiens Agenda (2015).

== Background ==
After the release of Leah on the Offbeat (2018), author Albertalli stated that there would be no further sequels to the "Simonverse". However, following the announcement of the novella on Twitter, she wrote that the readers' "enthusiasm is the reason I had the opportunity to write this." Albertalli has also confirmed that all profits from the sale of the book will be donated to The Trevor Project, an American LGBTQ nonprofit organization.
