= Love, Simon =

2018 American teen romantic comedy drama film

- Theatrical release poster
- Directed by: Greg Berlanti
- Screenplay by: Elizabeth Berger; Isaac Aptaker
- Based on: Simon vs. the Homo Sapiens Agenda by Becky Albertalli
- Produced by: Marty Bowen; Wyck Godfrey; Isaac Klausner; Pouya Shahbazian
- Starring: Nick Robinson; Josh Duhamel; Jennifer Garner
- Cinematography: John Guleserian
- Edited by: Harry Jierjian
- Music by: Rob Simonsen
- Production companies: Fox 2000 Pictures; Temple Hill Productions
- Distributed by: 20th Century Fox
- Release dates: February 27, 2018 (Mardi Gras Film Festival); March 16, 2018 (United States and Canada)
- Running time: 110 minutes
- Country: United States
- Language: English
- Budget: $10–17 million
- Box office: $67.1 million

Love, Simon is a 2018 American teen romantic comedy drama film directed by Greg Berlanti from a screenplay by Elizabeth Berger and Isaac Aptaker, based on the 2015 novel Simon vs. the Homo Sapiens Agenda by Becky Albertalli. The film stars Nick Robinson, Jennifer Garner, Josh Duhamel, Talitha Bateman, Katherine Langford, Alexandra Shipp, and Jorge Lendeborg Jr. It centers on Simon Spier, a closeted gay teenage boy who is forced to balance his friends, his family, and the blackmailer threatening to out him to the entire high school, while simultaneously attempting to discover the identity of the anonymous classmate whom he has fallen in love with online.

Love, Simon premiered at the Mardi Gras Film Festival on February 27, 2018, and was released in the United States by 20th Century Fox on March 16, 2018. Critics praised the film for its "big heart, diverse and talented cast, and revolutionary normalcy", characterized it as a "classic", described it as a "funny, warm-hearted and life-affirming tale" that is "tender, sweet, and affecting" and a "hugely charming crowd-pleaser" that is "funny, heartfelt, and truly touching", and compared it to the teen films of John Hughes.

Notable as the first film by a major film studio about a gay teenage romance, it grossed $66.7 million worldwide against a production budget of $10–17 million, and became the 15th-highest-grossing teen film and the 3rd-highest-grossing teen film by 20th Century Fox at the domestic box office since 1980. A sequel television series titled Love, Victor premiered on Hulu on June 17, 2020, and was released on Disney+ on June 15, 2022.

== Plot ==
Simon Spier is a closeted gay teenage boy living in a suburb of Atlanta, Georgia. He has a close and loving family—parents Emily and Jack, and sister Nora—as well as three best friends: Nick and Leah, both of whom he has known since kindergarten, and newcomer Abby.

Leah informs Simon about an online confession of a closeted gay classmate at their high school, known only by the pseudonym "Blue". Simon begins communicating with Blue via email using the pseudonym "Jacques". The two confide personal details and form a connection. Their emails are accidentally discovered by a classmate, Martin, who is infatuated with Abby. After learning his secret, Martin threatens to out Simon by making his emails public unless he helps him win over Abby. Simon begins trying to figure out which of his classmates is actually Blue. At a Halloween party, Simon suspects his classmate Bram and attempts to connect with him but later walks in on Bram making out with a girl. Nick confides in Simon that he has feelings for Abby. Simon lies to Nick, telling him that Abby has a boyfriend in college. Leah walks an inebriated Simon home, where she speaks vaguely about how she feels that she is fated to love one person very intensely; Simon believes she is referring to Nick.

Simon meets up with Abby and Martin at a Waffle House after he convinces them to practice lines together for an upcoming school musical. Simon bonds with their server, a classmate named Lyle, and now suspects that Lyle may be Blue. That night, Simon comes out to Abby and is relieved when she reacts positively. At a school football game, Simon crosses paths with Lyle; before he can summon the courage to ask if Lyle is Blue, he finds out Lyle is actually interested in Abby. An upset Simon tells a pestering Martin to either "go big or go home" when courting Abby. Martin interrupts the national anthem and publicly declares his feelings for Abby. When Abby admits she does not share those feelings, Martin is humiliated and becomes the subject of ridicule.

On Christmas Eve, to distract people from his own humiliation, Martin outs Simon by posting his emails on the school's gossip site. Simon's sister, Nora, tries to comfort Simon but he shuts her out and does not return his friends' texts and calls. Simon comes out to his parents on Christmas morning, to their surprise and acceptance. After the holidays, Nick and Abby, now a couple, confront Simon about the lies he told and learn that he tried to keep them apart due to Martin's blackmail. Leah confesses to Simon that she was in love with him, not Nick, and is upset that he attempted to set her up with Nick. After his friends break off from him, Simon receives a final email from Blue, who is upset that their emails have been leaked. Blue tells Simon that they should stop emailing and deletes his email account.

In the cafeteria, Simon and an openly gay classmate, Ethan, are mocked by bullies. Ethan and Simon bond over the difficulties they have faced coming out. After his mother comforts him, Simon apologizes to Leah and tells her he is in love with Blue, and then his father comforts him. Simon posts a confession on the gossip site apologizing to his friends, seeking out Blue and asking him to meet at the school carnival. After the school musical, Leah, Nick and Abby make amends with Simon and invite him to go to the carnival with them. Waiting for Blue at the carnival, Simon rides the Ferris wheel, drawing a large crowd of classmates. When Simon runs out of tickets, Martin buys him one more ride. Just before the ride begins, Bram sits next to Simon, revealing himself as Blue; the kiss with a girl was an inebriated error. They ride the Ferris wheel together and kiss as their friends and classmates cheer them on.

Simon's life returns to normal and Bram has become his boyfriend. While picking up his friends and boyfriend for school, Simon suggests that they forgo their usual morning routine and instead go "on a little adventure".

== Cast ==
- Nick Robinson as Simon Spier
  - Bryson Pitts as 10-year-old Simon Spier
  - Nye Reynolds as 5-year-old Simon Spier
- Josh Duhamel as Jack Spier, Simon's father
- Jennifer Garner as Emily Spier, Simon's mother
- Katherine Langford as Leah Burke, one of Simon's best friends
- Alexandra Shipp as Abby Suso, one of Simon's best friends
- Jorge Lendeborg Jr. as Nick Eisner, one of Simon's best friends
- Keiynan Lonsdale as Abraham "Bram" Greenfeld, Simon's love interest
- Miles Heizer as Cal Price, one of Simon's classmates
- Logan Miller as Martin Addison, one of Simon's classmates who blackmails him
- Tony Hale as Mr. Worth, the awkward vice principal of the school Simon attends
- Talitha Bateman as Nora Spier, Simon's sister
  - Skye Mowbray as 6-year-old Nora Spier
- Natasha Rothwell as Ms. Albright, Simon's drama teacher
- Drew Starkey as Garrett Laughlin, one of Simon's classmates
- Clark Moore as Ethan, one of Simon's classmates who is openly gay
- Joey Pollari as Lyle, a flirty server at a local diner
- Mackenzie Lintz as Taylor Metternich, one of Simon's classmates

== Production ==
=== Filming ===
Principal photography began on March 6, 2017, in Atlanta, Georgia. Filming officially ended on April 23, 2017, two days earlier than scheduled, which is an effort that film director Greg Berlanti made to offset the cost of paying royalties for the most expensive songs on the film's soundtrack.

Becky Albertalli, the author of the novel the film is based on, and YouTubers Megan Hughes, Riyadh Khalaf, and Doug Armstrong make cameo appearances in a cafeteria scene of the film.

=== Music ===
Love, Simon (Original Motion Picture Soundtrack) was released by RCA Records and Sony Music Entertainment, on March 16, 2018. It featured music by several artists including Bleachers, Troye Sivan, Amy Shark, Brenton Wood, The 1975, Normani and Khalid, among others. It featured at #37 on Billboard 200's chart, #3 on Billboard Top Soundtracks chart, and at #24 in Billboard Canadian Albums chart for the week beginning with March 31, 2018, while also featured at #161 on Billboard 200 year-ender chart.

Rob Simonsen's original score for the film was distributed by Lakeshore Records as Love, Simon (Original Motion Picture Score) and released alongside the soundtrack album.

== Themes ==
=== Secrecy ===
The film's central narrative addresses secrecy as it follows Simon Spier's coming out journey. From the early voice-over of the film, the main character's fears surrounding his sexual orientation become apparent as he explains "I'm just like you. I have a totally perfectly normal life. Except I have one huge-ass secret". The secret being that he is gay is further confirmed as his family, friends, and classmates assume that he is heterosexual. His father's jokes about his son's assumed heterosexuality awkwardly reminds Simon of why he waits to come out: he is scared of the change that could result of him being open about his sexual orientation. Therefore, throughout the story, he "takes calculated steps not to raise suspicions about his sexual orientation; [...] taking these measures to feign heterosexuality, Simon created emotional distance between himself and his family and friends". Simon's attempt at keeping this secret, combined with Martin blackmailing him, lead him to lie and deceive his friends to keep up this front.

Another form of secrecy is seen through the online relationship between Simon and his classmate Blue via anonymous emails. They connect over the fact that they are both closeted gay teenage boys at the same school and their fears surrounding coming out. As the plot unfolds, Simon becomes more comfortable with revealing his sexual orientation, mentioning that he wants to come out, and know the real identity of his love interest, but Blue is still not ready. In fact, Blue's identity remains a cliffhanger plot point until the very end of the film, as Simon wonders and imagines several classmates being his pen pal. Director Greg Berlanti seems to have "a lot of fun keeping us in suspense", and thus, makes use of secrecy all throughout the film.

=== Normativity ===
The concept of normal is common throughout the film as the main character fears that his sexual orientation is the only reason that he is different from everyone else. The film also seems to aim for a target audience of preadolescents, adolescents, and young adults who can relate to Simon: "It's clear we're meant to see Simon beyond what makes him different—we're meant to see ourselves in his quirks, his shenanigans, his triumphs and even his heartbreaks. And we do". The use of relatability to Simon's character is also supported by the omnipresence of homonormativity and heteronormativity. Simon can be seen as the "poster child of homonormativity".

Simon notably "distances himself from Ethan, a gender-non-conforming black gay boy, in a move that reinforces Simon's desire to be accepted into the mainstream". This theme of homonormativity can be explored through an examination of the Ethan character, as Simon seems to think that his classmate's coming out was easy and even implicitly excuses some of the homophobic bullying targeted at him when Simon says "I wish Ethan wouldn't make it so easy for them." The film adapts a representation of Simon's homosexuality as superior to Ethan's homosexuality as Simon believes "that Ethan should align more closely to homonormativity in order to become less of a target". The difference between these two characters' homosexuality helps to define this homonormativity as it is "privileging gender normativity, societal integration, assimilation" and the "construction of an acceptable homosexuality" over non-conformity. Simon is only seen as a victim of homophobia after he is outed by Martin and this also supports his femmephobia of Ethan's character. Additionally, the homonormativity means Simon has a "complicated path to coming out [whereas] Ethan's coming out is seen as a joke". This encapsulates how this concept negatively portrays femininity and "feminine gay men are commonly constructed as failures of homonormative gender expectations".

With the presence of homonormativity in the film, it is given context by the heteronormative world in which it originates. The story follows a white, heterosexual-passing, gender-conforming, and middle-class main character's experience. Therefore, the gay love story does not escape the influences of privilege. Simon wants to fit in not only for his sexual orientation, but also by having a "great love story" in the same manner as his heterosexual parents, friends, and classmates. Through the clever use of clichés and scenes like the other teenage characters coming out to their parents as heterosexual, the overarching theme of heteronormativity can be seen. It primarily shows up as a barrier to Simon coming out as he experiences the "societal pressure to conform, thereby exemplifying the embodiment of fear in the face of social norms".

=== Acceptance ===
The prominent emotion of fear essentially drives the film forward, making acceptance of Simon's sexual orientation by his friends and family a key takeaway. Though it can be homonormative in its illustration of a gay love story, the acceptance of homosexuality provides a happy ending and a story that "should be celebrated for [its] portrayals of gay happiness". His relationships with his family and friends are repaired and positively impacted by the end of the film, and he gets to be with his newfound love Bram, who revealed himself to be Blue. Moreover, Simon's mother's monologue is considered to be "especially moving". The aspects of comedy and romance of the film finds purpose in alleviating some of the pressures that Simon faces, but also offering the LGBT community some positive representation. Following the history of negative stereotypes against LGBT people, the film becomes "a long overdue exhale", because LGBT life "should not be defined as an inherently tragic way of life".

Acceptance is also seen as it relates to feeling connected with others and being authentic. Simon wishes to stay connected to the people around him and this is ultimately what slows him from coming out on his own terms at the start of the film. He mentions feeling that he would be accepted for his sexual orientation, but that he fears the changes it might bring to his life. Of course, with blackmail and an online exposure of his email exchanges, his coming out becomes forced and out of his control. Though these circumstances are unwarranted and hurtful, they help Simon's process of coming out and becoming accepted by his friends and family. This also seems to be relatable for many viewers of the film that share the idea of vulnerability in the face of love. Whether it be the acceptance of homosexuality or the gay romance in the film, there seems to be positive responses for its relatability. It was "broadly well-received, despite criticisms of Simon's privilege [...] some [fans] shared stories of how the film helped them come out". Finally, "there was a feeling of cathartic release in the theatre, unique in my experience, especially with teenage rom-com fare".

== Release ==
Love, Simon premiered at the Mardi Gras Film Festival on February 27, 2018, and also screened at the San Diego International Film Festival on February 28, 2018; the Glasgow Film Festival on March 2, 2018; and the Miami International Film Festival on March 10, 2018, ahead of its domestic release. The film was released by 20th Century Fox in the United States and Canada on March 16, 2018, and in other countries on various dates throughout 2018.

Following the film's release, many celebrities – including Jennifer Garner, Kristen Bell, Neil Patrick Harris, Joey Graceffa, Matt Bomer, Robbie Rogers, Benj Pasek, Tyler Oakley, Martin Gero, Andrew Rannells, and Jesse Tyler Ferguson – bought out theaters and offered free screenings of the film, because they believed it conveyed an important message.

Love, Simon is notable as the first film by a major film studio about a gay teenage romance.

=== Home media ===
The film became available to pre-order on home video on January 17, 2018; was released on digital media on May 29, 2018; and was released on Ultra HD Blu-ray, Blu-ray, and DVD on June 12, 2018.

== Reception ==
=== Box office ===
Love, Simon grossed $40.8 million at the domestic box office in the United States and Canada, and $25.9 million at the international box office, for a worldwide total of $66.7 million, against a production budget of $10–17 million. It is the 15th-highest-grossing teen film and the 3rd-highest-grossing teen film by 20th Century Fox, after The Fault in Our Stars and Romeo + Juliet, at the domestic box office since 1980.

Love, Simon held early preview screenings on March 10 before its official release on March 16, where it grossed $800,000 from 927 theaters, which Deadline Hollywood considered "strong". In the United States and Canada, the film was released alongside Tomb Raider and I Can Only Imagine, and was projected to gross $10–12 million from 2,401 theaters in its opening weekend. The film made $4.6 million on its first day (including $850,000 from Thursday previews at 2,125 theaters). The film went on to debut at $11.8 million, finishing fifth at the box office; 58% of its opening weekend audience was female and 59% was under 25. In its second weekend, the film dropped 33% to $7.8 million, finishing 7th, and in its third weekend made $4.8 million, finishing ninth.

In the United Kingdom, the film debuted fourth at the box office, earning $1.6 million. In Australia, the film debuted fourth at the box office, earning $916,697. In Brazil, the film debuted fourth at the box office, earning $804,567. In Mexico, the film debuted third at the box office, earning $982,391.

=== Critical response ===
Upon release, Love, Simon received positive reviews from film critics. On review aggregation website Rotten Tomatoes, the film has an approval rating of 92%, based on 239 reviews, with an average rating of 7.5/10, and the critical consensus states that "Love, Simon hits its coming-of-age beats more deftly than many entries in this well-traveled genre – and represents an overdue, if not entirely successful, milestone of inclusion". On Metacritic, the film has a weighted average score of 72 out of 100, based on 38 critics, which indicates "generally favorable" reviews. Audiences polled by CinemaScore gave the film an average grade of A+ on an A+ to F scale, which makes it one of fewer than 90 films in the history of the service to earn such a score.

Benjamin Lee of The Guardian gave the film four out of five stars and described it as a "hugely charming crowd-pleaser". Pete Hammond of Deadline Hollywood also gave the film four out of five stars and stated that audiences are "guaranteed to fall in love with this sweet, funny coming-of-age film, a feel-good-about-yourself movie full of universal truths that just might surprise you".

Molly Freeman of Screen Rant also gave the film four out of five stars or an Excellent rating and stated that it is a "funny, heartfelt, and truly touching teen romantic comedy that instantly becomes a modern classic for today's generation". Josh Winning of GamesRadar+ also gave the film four out five stars and described it as a "warm, sensitive and engaging coming-out-of-ager" and "one of the freshest teen-coms in ages".

Sandy Cohen of the Associated Press gave the film three and a half out of four stars and stated that the film treated the story of its protagonist with the "tender, timeless, Hollywood touch of John Hughes". Meredith Goldstein of The Boston Globe also gave the film three and a half out of four stars and stated that it is a "sweet, modern romantic comedy that manages to channel the teen movie classics of the late John Hughes, but only the good stuff".

Bruce Demara of the Toronto Star also gave the film three and a half out of four stars and wrote, "The casting is high quality, the script – with a tantalizing mystery at its heart – is particularly well-crafted and the story hits all the right emotional notes in delivering a funny, warm-hearted and life-affirming tale". Brian Truitt of USA Today also gave the film three and a half out of four stars and wrote, "Young and old, jocks and nerds, geeks and freaks, and everyone in between should be able to find something to adore in Love, Simon".

Max Weiss of Baltimore gave the film three out of four stars and described it as a "sweet, funny, warm-hearted film". Johnny Oleksinski of the New York Post also gave the film three out of four stars and described it "as sweet as a pecan pie baked by Dolly Parton".

Joyce Slaton of Common Sense Media gave the film four out of five stars and described it as "tender, sweet, and affecting". The film received The Common Sense Seal, which recognizes films that offer families an exceptional media experience. MJ Franklin of Mashable stated that the film "feels like an instant classic that you're going to want to watch again and again".

Peter Debruge of Variety stated that the film "marks an important first, even if the movie is pretty much average in all other respects", but praised the content as "groundbreaking on so many levels, not least of which is just how otherwise familiar it all seems". Jesse Hassenger of The A.V. Club gave the film a C+ and stated that the film is "touching as a gesture", but as entertainment "it's nothing Degrassi hasn't done better".

Becky Albertalli, the author of the novel on which the film is based, watched an early cut and praised the film: "It's funny and relevant and timeless and charming and honest and painful and so romantic. It says exactly what I wanted the book to say."

=== Accolades ===
Award nominations for Love, Simon
Award	Date	Category	Nominee(s)	Result
Human Rights Campaign	May 12, 2018	Ally for Equality Award	Nick Robinson	Won
Golden Trailer Awards	May 31, 2018	Best Billboard	"Love, Simon LA billboard" (Works Adv)	Nominated
Golden Trailer Awards	May 31, 2018	Best Romance Trailer	"Courage" (Transit)	Nominated
Golden Trailer Awards	May 31, 2018	Best Romance TV Spot	"Digital Heart" (Aspect)	Nominated
Golden Trailer Awards	May 31, 2018	Best Teaser Campaign	"Love, Simon Love Letter Wildposts" (Works Adv)	Won
Maui Film Festival	June 14, 2018	Rising Star Award	Nick Robinson	Won
MTV Movie & TV Awards	June 18, 2018	Best Kiss	Nick Robinson and Keiynan Lonsdale	Won
MTV Movie & TV Awards	June 18, 2018	Best Musical Moment	Love, Simon	Nominated
Teen Choice Awards	August 12, 2018	Choice Breakout Movie Star	Nick Robinson	Won
Teen Choice Awards	August 12, 2018	Choice Movie – Comedy	Love, Simon	Won
Teen Choice Awards	August 12, 2018	Choice Movie Ship	Nick Robinson and Keiynan Lonsdale	Nominated
Teen Choice Awards	August 12, 2018	Choice Music – R&B/Hip-Hop Song	"Love Lies" – Khalid & Normani	Won
People's Choice Awards	November 11, 2018	Comedy Movie of 2018	Love, Simon	Nominated
People's Choice Awards	November 11, 2018	Comedy Movie Star of 2018	Nick Robinson	Nominated
People's Choice Awards	November 11, 2018	Male Movie Star of 2018	Nick Robinson	Nominated
Black Reel Awards	February 9, 2019	Best Original or Adapted Song	"Love Lies" – Khalid & Normani	Nominated
Humanitas Prize	February 9, 2019	Comedy Feature Film	Isaac Aptaker and Elizabeth Berger	Won
Satellite Awards	February 17, 2019	Actor in Motion Picture, Comedy or Musical (Major, Independent or International)	Nick Robinson	Nominated
Satellite Awards	February 17, 2019	Original Song	"Strawberries & Cigarettes" – Alex Hope, Jack Antonoff and Troye Sivan	Nominated
GLAAD Media Award	March 28, 2019	Outstanding Film – Wide Release	Love, Simon	Won

== Sequel television series ==
A sequel television series titled Love, Victor premiered on Hulu on June 17, 2020, and was released on Disney+ on June 15, 2022. The series is not a continuation of the story of Simon Spier, portrayed by Nick Robinson, but rather the story of Victor Salazar, portrayed by Michael Cimino, which is set at the same high school. Nick Robinson returned as a narrator and a producer of the series, and his character, Simon Spier, appears in some episodes.
