= Stevie Kaufmann =

American socialite (1913–2004)

- Born: Steven N. Kaufmann; May 29, 1913; Pittsburgh, Pennsylvania, U.S.
- Died: May 18, 2004 (aged 90); New York City, U.S.
- Occupation(s): Socialite, fashion consultant
- Years active: 1938–2004

Steven N. Kaufmann (May 29, 1913 – May 18, 2004) was an American socialite. A member of the Kaufmann and May retailing families, he was known for his extensive acquaintance in the New York social scene. His obituary in the New York Times noted that "Stevie was not important. He never did a thing of note in his life except to find a million ways to enjoy it." Ruth Reichl, another acquaintance, said much the same in Save Me the Plums: My Gourmet Memoir.

Kauffmann was born May 29, 1913, the son of Nathan and Selma Kaufmann in Pittsburgh, Pennsylvania. His uncle, Edgar J. Kaufmann founded Kaufmann's Department Store. His mother was part of the family that owned the May Department Stores Company. After a brief period of working at Kaufmann's, Kaufmann moved to New York and lived off his family money, effectively retiring at age 25. Since his father died at 61 and his mother at 60, he expected his money to outlast him.

Early in his residence in New York, Kaufmann met Jerry Zipkin, who was similarly socially connected, and they became close friends. During World War II, Kaufmann was an army morale officer, making 104 crossings of the Atlantic on the RMS Queen Mary. After the war, he became acquainted with Bill Blass, who provided him with a paying job when Kaufmann outlived his money. Kaufmann worked at Pincus Brothers Maxwell, who manufactured Bill Blass Limited's clothes, until 2003.

Kauffmann's extensive acquaintance included Greta Garbo, Lena Horne, Rock Hudson, Nancy Reagan and Gertrude Lawrence. He spoke to Zipkin and Blass every day. Blass called Kaufmann "his oldest friend" and named him in his will.

Kauffmann died on May 18, 2004, of lung cancer, a few days short of his 91st birthday. He had lived at 25 West 54th Street for 65 years. He was survived by his partner of 18 years, Edward DeLuca.
