= The Gay Travel Guide for Tops and Bottoms =

2011 travel guide by Drew Blancs

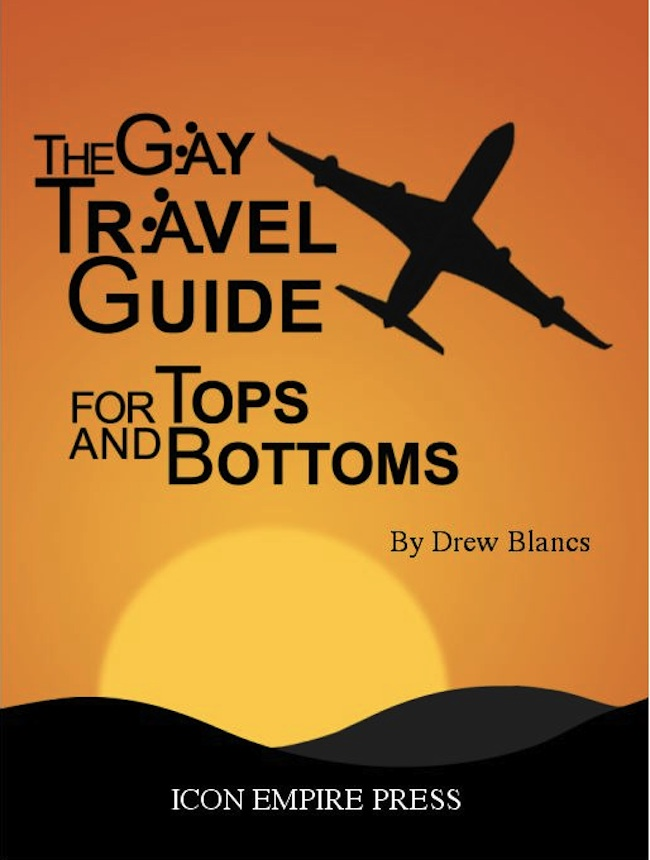
- Author: Drew Blancs
- Language: English
- Subject: Travel guide
- Publisher: Icon Empire Press
- Publication date: June 15, 2011
- Media type: Print, e-book
- Pages: 132 pages
- ISBN: 0986929786

The Gay Travel Guide For Tops And Bottoms is a 2011 international gay travel guide by Drew Blancs. The book was published on June 15, 2011, through Icon Empire Press. The author, Drew Blancs, spent 5 years traveling and writing the book. Blancs was a blogger from Los Angeles who had never written a book before and wrote it to assist people with finding compatible sex partners. The Gay Travel Guide for Tops and Bottoms set a sales record at its publisher Icon Empire Press for a new release. Robert Joseph of Goodreads praised the book calling it funny and recommended it "to those who are looking to have a fun way to travel."

== Contents ==
The book features reviews written by two men about thirteen countries in no chronological or alphabetical order. The reviews are written tongue in cheek, with each of the two reviewers given their own name depending on whether they prefer to be on top or on bottom during sex. Each man gives a review of their experience in each of the countries listed, as well as each country's taboos, sexual customs, and stance on homosexuality.

The countries reviewed in this guide book are: Singapore, Malaysia, Greece, Canada, South Korea, Thailand, Turkey, France, Philippines, Lebanon, India, Scotland, and Australia. The guide book lists hotels, restaurants and night clubs.

== Controversy ==
The book experienced some controversy when LinkedIn pulled an ad featuring the book from their website, citing that they objected to the sexual references of "tops" and "bottoms" in the title. The publisher responded that this was discrimination through censorship since the ads were targeted for men in the gay travel groups of LinkedIn. Icon Empire press also added that the book was intended as a humorous review and does not list any locations where men can find sex.
