= Love, Simon (soundtrack) =

2018 soundtrack album to Love, Simon

Love, Simon (Original Motion Picture Soundtrack)

Soundtrack album by Various artists
- Released: March 16, 2018
- Genre: indie pop
- Length: 47:24
- Labels: RCA; Sony

Singles from Love, Simon (Original Motion Picture Soundtrack)
- 1. "Alfie's Song (Not So Typical Love Song)" Released: January 10, 2018; 2. "Love Lies" Released: February 14, 2018; 3. "Strawberries & Cigarettes" Released: March 16, 2018

Love, Simon (Original Motion Picture Soundtrack) is the soundtrack album to the 2018 film of the same name. The soundtrack of the film includes music by Bleachers, Troye Sivan, Amy Shark, Brenton Wood, The 1975, Normani and Khalid, among others. The first track released from the soundtrack was "Alfie's Song (Not So Typical Love Song)", followed by "Love Lies" and "Strawberries & Cigarettes". The album was released by RCA Records and Sony Music Entertainment, on March 16, 2018, coinciding with the film's theatrical release. A separate score album, Love, Simon (Original Motion Picture Score), composed by Rob Simonsen was distributed and released by Lakeshore Records on the same day.

== Love, Simon (Original Motion Picture Soundtrack) ==
=== Track listing ===
No.	Title	Writer(s)	Performer	Length
1.	"Alfie's Song (Not So Typical Love Song)"	Jack Antonoff; Ilsey Juber; Harry Styles	Bleachers	3:01
2.	"Rollercoaster"	Antonoff; John Hill	Bleachers	3:12
3.	"Never Fall in Love"	Antonoff; Karen Marie Ørsted	Antonoff and MØ	3:36
4.	"Strawberries & Cigarettes"	Troye Sivan; Antonoff; Alex Hope	Sivan	3:21
5.	"Sink In"	Ben Berger; Julia Michaels; Ryan McMahon	Amy Shark	4:35
6.	"Love Lies"	Khalid Robinson; Normani Kordei Hamilton; Charlie Handsome; Jamil "Digi" Chammas; Taylor Parks	Khalid and Normani	3:23
7.	"The Oogum Boogum Song"	Alfred Smith	Brenton Wood	3:07
8.	"Love Me"	Adam Hann; George Daniel; Matthew Healy; Ross MacDonald	The 1975	3:42
9.	"I Wanna Dance with Somebody (Who Loves Me)"	George Merrill; Shannon Rubicam	Whitney Houston	4:50
10.	"Someday at Christmas"	Ron Miller; Bryan Wells	Jackson 5	2:44
11.	"Wings"	Nini Fabi; Benjamin Gebert	Haerts	4:58
12.	"Keeping a Secret"	Antonoff; Justin Tranter	Bleachers	3:25
13.	"Wild Heart"	Antonoff; Hill	Bleachers	3:21
Total length:				47:24

=== Additional music ===
Other songs that appear in the film but are not included on its soundtrack include "Waterloo Sunset" by The Kinks, "Diamond" by MONAKR, "Nobody Speak" by DJ Shadow & Run the Jewels, "Feel It Still" by Portugal. The Man, "No" by Meghan Trainor, "Out the Speakers" by A-Trak, Milo and Otis feat. Rich Kidz, "As Long as You Love Me" by Justin Bieber, "Add It Up" by Violent Femmes, "Monster Mash" by Bobby Pickett, "Bad Romance" by Lady Gaga (performed by the Michigan Marching Band), "Shine a Light" by BANNERS, and "Heaven" by Warrant.

=== Charts ===
==== Weekly charts ====
Chart (2018)	Peak position
Australian Albums (ARIA)	82
Canadian Albums (Billboard)	24
UK Soundtrack Albums (Official Charts)	11
US Billboard 200	37
US Top Soundtracks	3

==== Year-end charts ====
Chart (2018)	Position
US Billboard 200	161

=== Accolades ===
Award	Date	Category	Nominee(s)	Result	Ref.
MTV Movie & TV Awards	June 18, 2018	Best Musical Moment	"I Wanna Dance With Somebody (Who Loves Me)” – Whitney Houston	Nominated	
Teen Choice Awards	August 12, 2018	Choice Music – R&B/Hip-Hop Song	"Love Lies" – Khalid & Normani	Won	
Black Reel Awards	February 9, 2019	Best Original or Adapted Song	"Love Lies" – Khalid & Normani	Nominated	
Guild of Music Supervisors Awards	February 13, 2019	Best Music Supervision for Films Budgeted Under $10 Million	Season Kent	Nominated	
Satellite Awards	February 17, 2019	Original Song	"Strawberries & Cigarettes" – Alex Hope, Jack Antonoff and Troye Sivan	Nominated	

== Love, Simon (Original Motion Picture Score) ==
Love, Simon (Original Motion Picture Score)

Film score by Rob Simonsen
- Released: March 16, 2018
- Recorded: 2017–2018
- Genre: Film score
- Length: 47:24
- Label: Lakeshore Records

Rob Simonsen chronology
Father Figures (2017)	Love, Simon (2018)	Tully (2018)

=== Track listing ===
All music is composed by Rob Simonsen.

No.	Title	Length
1.	"Simon And Blue"	4:08
2.	"The Spier House"	1:04
3.	"Love, Simon"	2:36
4.	"Car Confessions"	2:30
5.	"Change Is Exhausting"	1:40
6.	"Vacation in the Middle of Nowhere"	1:23
7.	"New Message"	1:03
8.	"Creekwood High"	1:41
9.	"Gonna Get Some Air"	1:31
10.	"Coming Out Straight"	1:10
11.	"Abbey Deserves a Superhero"	2:07
12.	"You Get to Breathe Now"	1:57
13.	"Homecoming"	1:46
14.	"Doves"	2:11
15.	"Promise Me You Won't Disappear"	2:45
16.	"Tell Me About Blue"	0:51
17.	"I Shouldn't Have Missed It"	1:47
18.	"Something I Want to Tell You"	4:17
19.	"You Know Where to Find Me"	1:08
Total length:		37:47
