= Jerry Zipkin =

American socialite (1914–1995)

- Born: Jerome Robert Zipkin; December 18, 1914; New York City, U.S.
- Died: June 8, 1995 (aged 80); New York City, U.S.
- Occupations: Investor; socialite
- Years active: 1940–1995

Jerome Robert "Jerry" Zipkin (December 18, 1914 – June 8, 1995) was an American socialite. He was known for his friendship with Nancy Reagan, with whom he attended many of her social events, and for his role as a "walker," or social escort, for women at high-society events.

== Early life ==
Zipkin was born on December 18, 1914, in Manhattan to David Zipkin and Annette Goldstein. His father was a prominent New York real estate developer. Zipkin attended the Hun School of Princeton and then Princeton University, where he studied art and archaeology for two years. After leaving college he briefly moved to Florida, then returned to New York to assist his father in managing the family properties, which included the building Jerry lived in on Park Avenue.

== Socialite ==
Zipkin became known as a "walker," a man who would escort fashionable women to social events when their husbands were busy or did not care to accompany them. The term first appeared in Women's Wear Daily to describe Zipkin. Many of the women of Zipkin's acquaintance relied on his advice on fashion and styling. Also known as "the social moth", Zipkin became a trusted confidant who would give candid advice, often pointed or acerbic. The title character of the 2007 movie The Walker was based on Zipkin's social life.

In the 1940s, Zipkin spent time in California, and was introduced into Hollywood society, becoming acquainted with George Cukor, Paulette Goddard, Claudette Colbert, and Somerset Maugham. In 1949, Zipkin stayed with Maugham on the French Riviera. Maugham may have used his friend as the model for the snobbish Elliott Templeton in The Razor's Edge.

In the mid 1960s, Zipkin became acquainted with Nancy and Ronald Reagan, becoming a close friend to Nancy. They continued the friendship, which intensified, when Reagan ran for president. Zipkin accompanied the Reagans to campaign events and was with them on the night Reagan won election. Women's Wear Daily modified the "social moth" epithet to "social mouth", acknowledging Zipkin's reputation as a "nebulous, bitchy, very, very pretentious and affected" man. However, Zipkin was equally regarded for ferocious loyalty to his friends.

Zipkin inherited his art-filled apartment on Park Avenue from his parents. His mother continued to live there until her death in the 1970s. Zipkin died on June 8, 1995, of lung cancer. He was attended at his death by Nancy Reagan and longtime friend Stevie Kaufmann.
