= Love Lies (song) =

2018 song by Khalid and Normani

Single by Khalid and Normani

from the album Love, Simon
- Released: February 14, 2018
- Genre: R&B
- Length: 3:21
- Label: RCA
- Composers: Jamil Chammas; Ryan Vojtesak
- Lyricists: Khalid Robinson; Normani Hamilton; Taylor Parks
- Producers: Charlie Handsome; Digi

Khalid singles chronology
"Saved" (2017)	"Love Lies" (2018)	"Lovely" (2018)

Normani singles chronology
"Love Lies" (2018)	"Waves" (2018)

Music video
- "Love Lies" on YouTube

"Love Lies" is a song by American singers Khalid and Normani for the film Love, Simon. It was released through RCA Records on February 14, 2018, as the second single from the film's soundtrack, which was curated by Jack Antonoff. The song was written by the singers alongside Tayla Parx and producers Charlie Handsome & Digi. It marked Normani's first single release outside of Fifth Harmony.

"Love Lies" reached number nine on the US Billboard Hot 100, and also peaked within the top ten in six additional countries. It was the first duet with two African-American singers to reach number one on the US Mainstream Top 40 chart in over 20 years. The song also peaked at number two on the Rhythmic Top 40 chart. It was certified 5× platinum by the Recording Industry Association of America for selling over five million units; and was also certified diamond in Brazil, 5× platinum in Australia, and platinum or higher in five additional countries.

The song broke the record for the highest first-week position for a debut single by a girl group member. It was the top R&B song of 2018, according to BuzzAngle Music, and was the most Shazammed R&B song of 2018. "Love Lies" spent 45 weeks on Billboard's Mainstream Top 40 airplay chart, which tied the record at the time for most weeks on the chart. In 2019, Billboard named it the seventh biggest song of the 2010s decade on the Mainstream Top 40 chart. In 2021, the song was revealed to be the fifth most thumbed up duet on Pandora, of all time.

== Background ==
Normani first hinted at a possible collaboration between her and Khalid via an Instagram post in July 2017. Khalid also opened up about the collaboration during an interview with MTV News the next month. Later, Normani confirmed to Billboard that they were working together on collaboration ideas, calling him "an important artist and a great friend". She divulged to Kode in an interview in October 2017, when asked to share information on the collaboration:

Khalid and I have been wanting to work together for some time. We actually got into the studio and were excited about a record we wrote together along with Tayla Parx. It was all one huge vibe session. We wanted to create something that our peers would fall in love with. I remember him telling me "I want this to be my favorite record, if I were listening, I want it to be something I vibe with that's just dope," which is something I relate to because I listen to our song every day. Issa vibe. But the greatest part of it all is that were genuinely two friends that created something special that were so proud of. We're in two different countries on tour but we still text each other sometimes like, "but that record though..."

The duet was officially announced on January 16, 2018. On February 12, 2018, Normani posted a photograph of her and Khalid, captioning the photo: "2/14". Similarly, Khalid posted the single artwork with the same caption. The two artists also teased a few lyrics from the song, with Khalid replying Normani's announcement with "tell me where your love lies", to which Normani replied: "waste the day and spend the night". Normani spoke to Zane Lowe on his Beats 1 radio show about the song, saying that recording it was a "growing process" for her. "I feel like people are actually getting like a sense of who I actually am," she said. "Being in the studio and partnering with Khalid, it actually tells me more about myself that I didn't necessarily know was even there. This is definitely [a] growing process and I can't wait. I'm so excited for the journey."

== Composition ==
Musically, "Love Lies" is an R&B song that contains elements of snap, as well as synths and vocal effects. The song's verses are resigned and have a quaint 1980s sound, laden with a simple finger-click beat and drums. Khalid and Normani's vocals are both in E♭ minor.

== Critical reception ==
Nina Braca of Billboard wrote a positive review of the song, saying: "The romantically curious lyrics perfectly compliment Normani's smooth vocals over a simple guitar riff and slow pop beat." Hugh McIntyre of Fuse deemed the song "a laid-back R&B affair so mature it's difficult to believe the artists behind it are so young and still just getting started in their respective careers". He called the production "a natural progression" for Khalid and something "not far from Normani's comfort zone", and displaying herself as a ”sex symbol”. He also praised the guitar loop, calling it "a nice touch on a beat that is fairly sparse, and at times, nonexistent", writing that "it helps this song stand out among the hundreds of other similar tracks". Sam Damshenas of Gay Times described it as "incredibly catchy and addictive". Mike Wass of Idolator opined that "the dreamy mid-tempo anthem showcases her voice and hints at the R&B/pop direction of her side-project".

Billboard's critics' list placed it second on "Every Fifth Harmony Solo Single, Ranked" in March 2018, while "Love Lies" topped Billboard's critics' list on "Every Khalid collaboration, Ranked" in April 2019. Furthermore, Vanity Fair mentioned it among a group of "genre-averse" pop songs that blended multiple elements from other genres, and defined 2018 in music, and stated that "Love Lies" along with the other listed songs opened the door for ensuing genre-blending smash hits like "Old Town Road" by Lil Nas X and Billy Ray Cyrus. Former United States president Barack Obama named the song among his favorites of 2018 on social media.

=== Accolades ===
Year-end lists
Publication	Accolade	Rank	Ref.
Associated Press	Top Songs of 2018	7	
Billboard	100 Best Songs of 2018	39	
Entertainment Tonight Canada	The 20 Best songs of 2018	10	
HipHopDX	R&B songs of the year	6	
Idolator	100 Best singles of 2018	71	
IHeartRadio	140 Songs That Defined The 2010s	—N/a	
Refinery29	100 Best songs of 2018	—N/a	

== Commercial sales ==
=== Hot 100 ===
In the United States, "Love Lies" debuted at number 43 on the Billboard Hot 100, opening with 22,000 downloads and 11.7 million streams in its first week. This entry tied Fifth Harmony with Destiny's Child, The Go-Go's and Labelle for the most members (three) from an all-female group to chart solo on the Hot 100, with Normani being the third. It also scored the highest first-week position for a debut single by a girl group member; formerly, Diana Ross' first solo single "Reach Out and Touch (Somebody's Hand)" debuted at 49. After the pair performed on the Billboard Music Awards on May 20, "Love Lies" entered the top 40 on the Hot 100, moving from number 47 to 36.

The song eventually entered the top ten, reached a peak of number nine on the Hot 100. Khalid earned his second Hot 100 top ten and first as a lead artist, following his featured turn on Logic's "1-800-273-8255," which reached the region in September 2017. Normani reached the top 10 in her first solo visit to the Hot 100; she previously reached the region once as a member of Fifth Harmony. "Love Lies" claimed the longest climb to the top 10 among duets after reaching the region in its 28th week, surpassing the 19-week trip set by Billy Preston and Syreeta's "With You I'm Born Again," in 1979–80. "Love Lies" is the 10th single to reach the region in 28 weeks or more, while Carrie Underwood's "Before He Cheats" holds the overall record: 38 weeks to the top 10 in 2006–2007. The track spent nearly a full year on the Billboard Hot 100, staying on the chart for 51 weeks.

=== Pop radio ===
"Love Lies" topped the Billboard Mainstream Top 40 (pop radio airplay) chart, with Khalid earning his first number one and Normani earning her first solo number one. It claimed the longest climb to number one for a duet, doing it in its 24th week, and the third-longest among all songs. "Love Lies" became the first song released from a soundtrack to top the Mainstream Top 40 since Justin Timberlake's "Can't Stop the Feeling!" in June 2016. Fifth Harmony joined One Direction and Destiny's Child as the third group to spin off at least two chart-topping members on the mentioned chart.

Revolt TV noted in its "Charting Black Excellence" column, that "Love Lies" was the first song with solely black artists to top the pop charts since Flo Rida’s "My House" in 2016. According to music executive Courtney Stewart, It was the first duet by two African-American singers to reach number one at pop radio in 20 plus years. "Love Lies" spent 45 weeks on the chart and tied the record for the longest charting song on the Mainstream Top 40 chart. "Love Lies" also stayed in the Top 10 of the chart for twenty six weeks, making it the first song by a female artist or by black artists to do so.

In 2019, Billboard named it the seventh biggest song of the 2010s decade on the Mainstream Top 40 chart.

=== Global chart performance, and year-end charts ===
It was announced that "Love Lies" was the most-Shazamed R&B songs of 2018, in December of that year. "Love Lies" was also announced as one of the top 100 most-streamed songs of 2018 on Apple Music, landing at number 38. The song was one of the top 30 most-consumed songs of that year, landing at number 27 on Variety's 2018 Hitmakers list compiled by BuzzAngle Music. According to the 2018 BuzzAngle Music year-end report, it was the top R&B song of that year.

Outside the United States it peaked within the top ten of the charts in Australia, Denmark, New Zealand, Portugal and the Republic of Ireland and the top twenty of the charts in Sweden and the United Kingdom. The song cracked the top five on Spotify global viral chart. It finished the year as the second most-streamed collaboration of 2018 by New Zealand audiences on Spotify. As of 2018, it is the most-streamed female song ever by South African audiences on Spotify.

== Music video ==
The song's music video premiered on February 16, 2018. It was directed by filmmakers Gerard Bush and Christopher Renz. The video is situated in Downtown Los Angeles. Khalid plays a valet worker at a local hotel while Normani acts as a superstar staying there. It started with the two texting, they plan to meet each other in their "favorite room". Normani later arrives at the scene in a fancy car, Khalid opens her door and she heads up to her room, in which she showed off her dance moves in front of a window, as Khalid enjoys the performance from a nearby rooftop. It ended with the two celebrating with love messages via text. As of January 2022, the music video has reached over 217 million views.

== Cover versions and usage in the media ==
=== Covers and remixes ===
"Love Lies" was covered by the Canadian indie pop band Walk off the Earth, in 2018. The song was covered on BBC Radio 1 by Swedish singer Zara Larsson. Singer Jared Leto of the rock band Thirty Seconds to Mars, thanked the two artists for their "amazing songs and voices" after the band covered the song on BBC Radio 1, in a mashup with Juice Wrld's "Lucid Dreams" and Post Malone's "Better Now". The song was performed on season 18 of Idols South Africa by contestants Sean-Mickayla and Sai. It has also been performed on the American music competition series The Voice by contestants Tyshawn Colquitt and Zaxai on season 15 during the battle rounds, and on season 16 by Jej Vinson. Kelly Clarkson covered the song while on tour, in support of her album Meaning of Life. Actress and singer Coco Jones, posted a cover of the track, in a mashup with Ella Mai's "Boo'd Up" to her YouTube account.

In June 2018, an official remix of the track was released featuring rapper Rick Ross. Other notable remixes include versions by British edm duo Snakehips, Medasin, Louis the child, record producer Matt Medved, Jimmie and Felix Palmqvist, Harber, and Fairlane (featuring rapper IDK).

=== Usage in media ===
"Love Lies" was in included in a mashed up of the year's biggest hits by DJ Earworm for the track "United States of Pop 2018". It was also included on the popular music compilation albums Now That's What I Call Music! 66, and Kidz Bop 39. The song was featured on the British revival of Love Island, during episode 4 of Season 7.

== Live performances ==
The two artists performed "Love Lies" for the first time at The Tonight Show Starring Jimmy Fallon, on April 10, 2018. On May 20, 2018, Khalid and Normani performed the song again at the 2018 Billboard Music Awards. The performance went viral on social media, generating positive feedback from multiple publications and fans, who commended Normani's turn during the show, comparing it to Beyoncé. They also received a standing ovation from K-pop group BTS. While several other celebrities such as Lily Allen, Zendaya, Jennifer Hudson, and Anita Baker, took to Twitter to praise the performance.

The two artists have since performed the song together during Khalid's sets at 2019 Coachella, 2018 Lollapalooza, 2018 IHeartRadio Jingle Ball, and during Normani's opening set at Ariana Grande's Sweetener World Tour in Los Angeles, California.

== Credits and personnel ==
Credits adapted from Tidal.

- Khalid – vocals, songwriting
- Normani Kordei Hamilton – vocals, songwriting
- Jamil Chammas – production
- Charlie Handsome – production
- Serban Ghenea – mix engineering
- John Hanes – engineering

== Awards and nominations ==
Year	Award	Category	Result
2018	Teen Choice Awards	Choice R&B/Hip-Hop Song	Won
2019	Billboard Music Award	Top Collaboration	Nominated
2019	Billboard Music Award	Top Radio Song	Nominated
2019	Black Reel Awards	Best Original or Adapted Song	Nominated
2019	iHeartRadio Music Awards	Titanium Award	Won
2019	BMI Pop Awards	Award-winning songs	Won
2019	ASCAP Pop Awards	Award-winning songs	Won

== Charts ==
=== Weekly charts ===
Chart (2018–2019)	Peak position
Australia (ARIA)	3
Austria (Ö3 Austria Top 40)	38
Belgium (Ultratip Bubbling Under Flanders)	2
Belgium (Ultratip Bubbling Under Wallonia)	14
Canada Hot 100 (Billboard)	21
Czech Republic Singles Digital (ČNS IFPI)	16
Denmark (Tracklisten)	9
France (SNEP)	127
Germany (GfK)	36
Hungary (Stream Top 40)	11
Ireland (IRMA)	8
Netherlands (Dutch Top 40)	24
Netherlands (Single Top 100)	17
New Zealand (Recorded Music NZ)	2
Norway (VG-lista)	17
Portugal (AFP)	9
Scottish Singles Sales (Official Charts)	23
Slovakia Singles Digital (ČNS IFPI)	14
Spain (PROMUSICAE)	97
Sweden (Sverigetopplistan)	12
Switzerland (Schweizer Hitparade)	46
UK Singles (Official Charts)	12
UK Hip Hop/R&B (Official Charts)	5
US Billboard Hot 100	9
US Adult Pop Airplay (Billboard)	18
US Dance Airplay (Billboard)	4
US Pop Airplay (Billboard)	1
US Radio Songs (Billboard)	1
US Rhythmic Airplay (Billboard)	2

=== Year-end charts ===
Chart (2018)	Position
Australia (ARIA)	13
Canada (Canadian Hot 100)	21
Denmark (Tracklisten)	27
Ireland (IRMA)	33
Netherlands (Single Top 100)	60
New Zealand (Recorded Music NZ)	5
Portugal (AFP)	26
Sweden (Sverigetopplistan)	66
UK Singles (Official Charts Company)	52
US Billboard Hot 100	19
US Dance/Mix Show Airplay (Billboard)	23
US Mainstream Top 40 (Billboard)	6
US Radio Songs (Billboard)	20
US Rhythmic (Billboard)	3
Chart (2019)	Position
US Billboard Hot 100	88
US Mainstream Top 40 (Billboard)	30
US Radio Songs (Billboard)	41

=== Decade-end charts ===
Chart (2010–2019)	Position
US Mainstream Top 40 (Billboard)	7

== Certifications ==
Region	Certification	Certified units/sales
Australia (ARIA)	5× Platinum	350,000^{‡}
Brazil (Pro-Música Brasil)	Diamond	160,000^{‡}
Canada (Music Canada)	4× Platinum	320,000^{‡}
Denmark (IFPI Danmark)	Platinum	90,000^{‡}
France (SNEP)	Gold	100,000^{‡}
Germany (BVMI)	Gold	200,000^{‡}
Italy (FIMI)	Gold	25,000^{‡}
Mexico (AMPROFON)	Gold	30,000^{‡}
New Zealand (RMNZ)	6× Platinum	180,000^{‡}
Norway (IFPI Norway)	Gold	30,000^{‡}
Poland (ZPAV)	Gold	25,000^{‡}
Portugal (AFP)	Platinum	10,000^{‡}
Spain (Promusicae)	Gold	30,000^{‡}
United Kingdom (BPI)	2× Platinum	1,200,000^{‡}
United States (RIAA)	5× Platinum	5,000,000^{‡}
Streaming
Sweden (GLF)	Platinum	8,000,000^{†}
^{‡} Sales+streaming figures based on certification alone.^{†} Streaming-only figures based on certification alone.

== Release history ==
Region	Date	Format	Version	Label	Ref.
Various	February 14, 2018	Digital download	Original	RCA	
Australia	February 16, 2018	Contemporary hit radio	Original	Sony	
United States	March 20, 2018	Contemporary hit radio	Original	RCA	
Italy	March 30, 2018	Contemporary hit radio	Original	Sony	
United States	April 17, 2018	Urban contemporary radio	Original	RCA	
Various	May 11, 2018	Digital download	Snakehips remix	RCA	
Various	June 13, 2018	Digital download	Rick Ross remix	RCA	
