= Gay best friend =

Media trope of homosexual men

A gay best friend (GBF) is a homosexual man who has a close platonic relationship with a heterosexual woman. The term most often applies to a trope involving gay characters in fiction.

The gay best friend is a recurring theme in media, particularly from the 1990s and 2000s. He is usually flamboyant, fashionable, and white; he serves as a sidekick to the heterosexual woman. These portrayals became a common theme in Western cinema at the end of the 20th century, with notable examples such as the 1997 romantic comedy My Best Friend's Wedding and the 1998 romantic drama Get Real.

Portrayals of the gay best friend have been criticized as being harmful to young queer audiences. The filmmaker Amrou Al-Kadhi stated that "it was quite harmful for younger queer audiences to only see themselves in this way, as Shakespearean fools; not intrinsic to the story, but more there to offer the straights some comic relief." The portrayals are typically nonsexual, described by Al-Kadhi as "always a bit of a eunuch: sexually harmless, more a court jester than anything else".

A July 2010 article in Teen Vogue called the gay best friend a "must-have item" for fashionable young women. Some research has been undertaken regarding heterosexual women who befriend homosexual men; these women have been referred to by the derogatory term fag hag.

== See also ==
- G.B.F. (film)
- Media portrayal of LGBTQ people
- Tokenism
- Beard (companion)
- Walker (escort)
