= Becky Albertalli =

American author (born 1982)

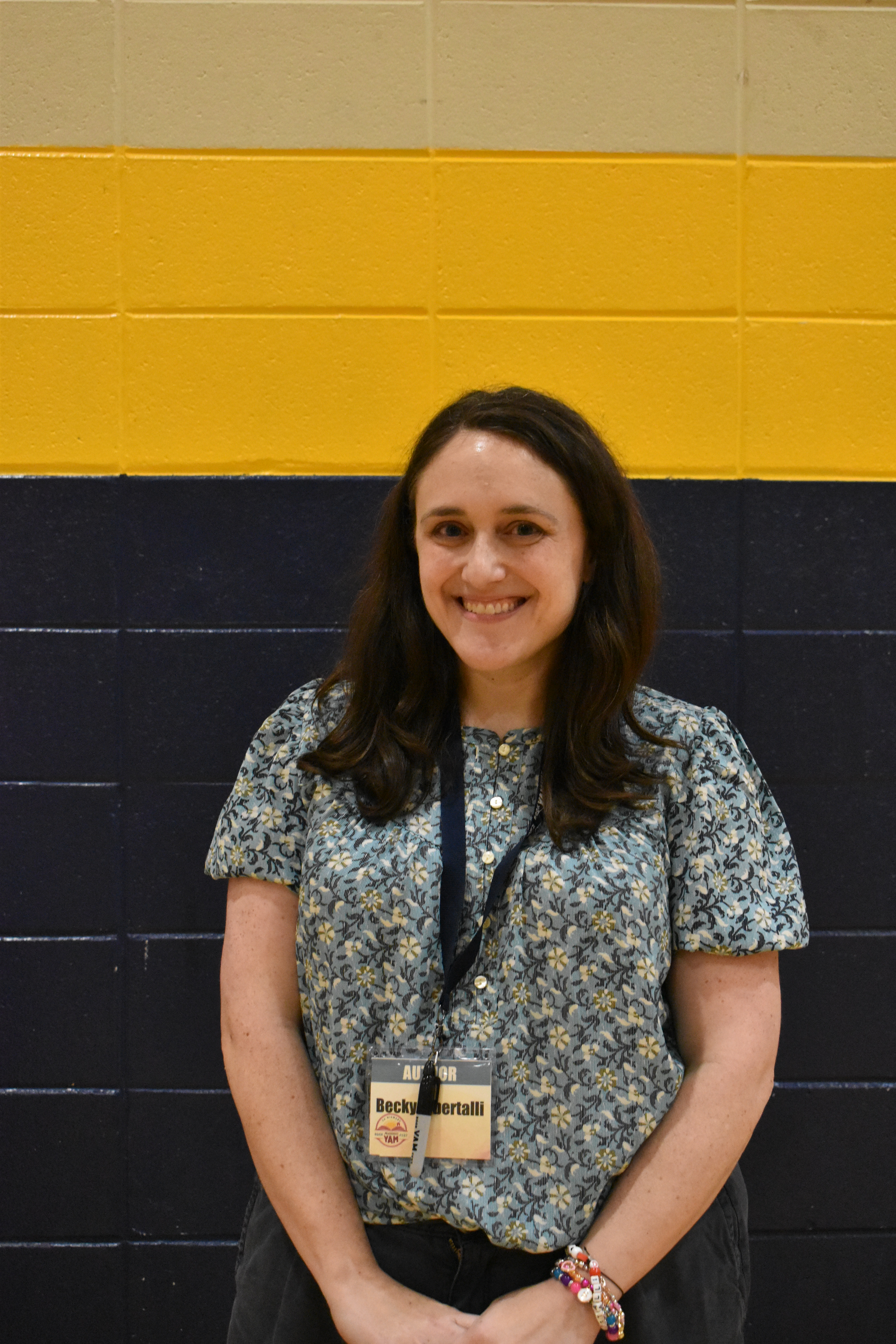
- Albertalli at YA Midwest on July 26, 2025
- Born: Rebecca Goldstein; November 17, 1982 (age 44); Atlanta, Georgia, U.S.
- Education: Wesleyan University (BA); George Washington University (PhD)
- Occupations: Novelist; former psychologist
- Spouse: Brian Albertalli
- Children: 2
- Writing career
- Period: 2015–present
- Genres: Young adult; Romance; LGBT; Coming of Age
- Notable works: Simon vs. the Homo Sapiens Agenda; Leah on the Offbeat; The Upside of Unrequited; Love, Creekwood; Kate In Waiting; Imogen, Obviously; Amelia, If Only
- Notable awards: William C. Morris Award: Best Young Adult Debut (2016); National Book Award: Young People's Literature (2015); Stonewall Book Award: Young Adult Books (2024)
- Website: beckyalbertalli.com

Rebecca Albertalli (née Goldstein; born November 17, 1982) is an American author of young adult fiction and former psychologist. She is known for her 2015 debut novel, Simon vs. the Homo Sapiens Agenda, which was adapted into the 2018 film Love, Simon and inspired the spin-off television series Love, Victor. Albertalli has subsequently published seven additional novel-length works of young adult fiction, along with 2020's novella Love, Creekwood, from which Albertalli has donated all proceeds to The Trevor Project.

== Life and career ==
Albertalli was born and raised in the Atlanta metropolitan area, with her sister Caroline and brother Sam, where she still lives with her husband, Brian, and two sons, Owen and Henry. Albertalli was raised in a Reform Jewish household. Albertalli attended Wesleyan University and majored in psychology, before moving to Washington, D.C., and earning her Doctor of Psychology degree from George Washington University. In her psychological practice, she specialized in working with LGBTQ teens and gender nonconforming children. She worked as a psychologist until 2012—when her first son was born—and subsequently decided to try writing a novel. Albertalli cites Australian author Jaclyn Moriarty as her primary inspiration in becoming a novelist.

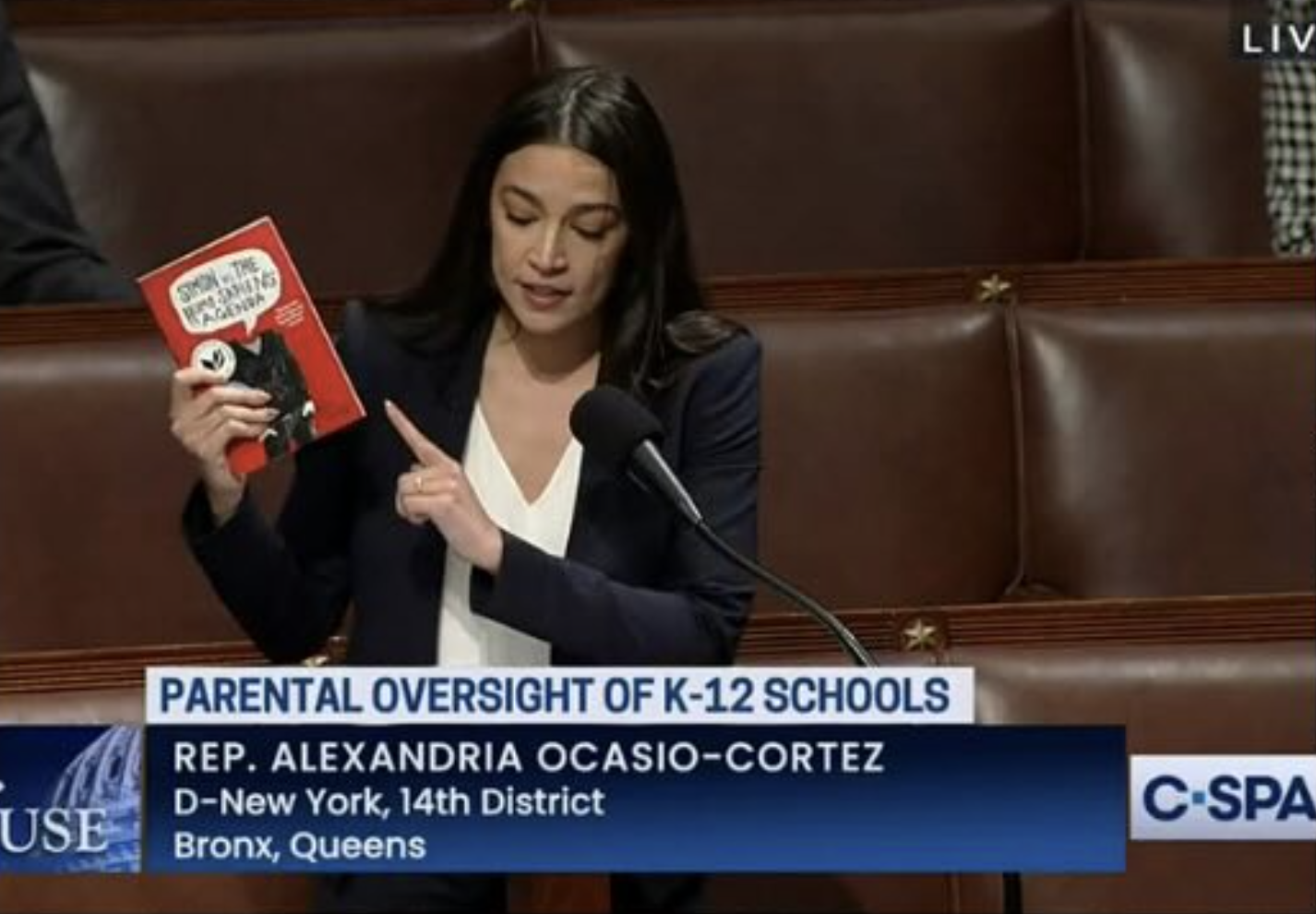
U.S. Rep. Alexandria Ocasio-Cortez holding Albertalli's debut novel, Simon vs. the Homo Sapiens Agenda, in the United States House of Representatives

On April 7, 2015, Albertalli's debut novel, Simon vs. the Homo Sapiens Agenda, was published. A sequel to Simon vs. the Homo Sapiens Agenda, titled Leah on the Offbeat, was released in 2018 and won the Goodreads Choice Award for Best Young Adult Fiction. In 2020, Albertalli released the third and final installment of the series, Love, Creekwood, described as an "epilogue."

Additional works include The Upside of Unrequited, Love, Creekwood, and the What If It's Us duology, the latter of which she co-wrote with Adam Silvera. Movie rights to What If It's Us sold to Anonymous Content in 2018, with Brian Yorkey attached as screenwriter. The film rights to The Upside of Unrequited were obtained by Shakespeare Sisters, a U.K. production company, in 2021. That year, Albertalli released her next novel, Kate in Waiting. In 2023, Albertalli published Imogen, Obviously, which became another New York Times best seller and received acclaim from Kirkus Reviews, Publishers Weekly, Booklist, and more. In 2024, Imogen, Obviously was named a Stonewall Honor Book.

== Personal life ==
In August 2020, Albertalli came out as bisexual in an essay responding to public figures who had criticized her for writing about gay characters as a presumed heterosexual. She stated that coming out was not an "attempt to neutralize criticism of [her] books" and asked her critics to acknowledge that "carelessness in these discussions has caused real harm".

== Bibliography ==
=== Simonverse ===
- Simon vs. the Homo Sapiens Agenda (Balzer + Bray, 2015)
- The Upside of Unrequited (Balzer + Bray, 2017)
- Leah on the Offbeat (Balzer + Bray, 2018)
- Love, Creekwood (Balzer + Bray, 2020)

=== Imogenverse ===
- Imogen, Obviously (Balzer + Bray, 2023)
- Amelia, If Only (HarperCollins, 2025)

=== What If It's Us ===
- What If It's Us, co-written with Adam Silvera (HarperTeen, 2018)
- Here's To Us, co-written with Adam Silvera (HarperTeen/Balzer + Bray, 2021)

=== Standalone works ===
- Yes No Maybe So, co-written with Aisha Saeed (Balzer + Bray, 2019)
- Kate in Waiting (Balzer + Bray, 2021)
- Something Unpredictable (Balzer + Bray, 2027)

=== Short essays ===
- In Dear Heartbreak: YA Authors and Teens on the Dark Side of Love, edited by Heather Demetrios (Henry Holt, 2018)

== Filmography ==
Year	Title	Director	Screenwriters	Based on	Ref.
2018	Love, Simon	Greg Berlanti	Isaac Aptaker, Elizabeth Berger	Simon vs. the Homo Sapiens Agenda	

== Awards ==
- 2015 American Library Association's William C. Morris Award for Simon vs. the Homo Sapiens Agenda
- 2015 National Book Award longlist for Simon vs. the Homo Sapiens Agenda
- 2015 Goodreads Choice Award finalist for Best Debut Author for Albertalli and Best Young Adult Fiction for Simon vs. the Homo Sapiens Agenda
- 2015 Wall Street Journal Best Young Adult novel for Simon vs. the Homo Sapiens Agenda
- 2016 Carnegie Medal nominee for Simon vs. the Homo Sapiens Agenda
- 2016 Lambda Literary Award finalist for LGBT Children's/Young Adult for Simon vs. the Homo Sapiens Agenda
- 2016 YALSA Best Fiction for Young Adults for Simon vs. the Homo Sapiens Agenda
- 2017 German Youth Literature Prize for Simon vs. the Homo Sapiens Agenda
- 2017 New York Public Library Best Books for Teens for The Upside of Unrequited
- 2018 American Library Association's Rainbow List for The Upside of Unrequited
- 2018 Goodreads Choice Award for Best Young Adult Novel for Leah on the Offbeat
- 2019 American Library Association's Rainbow Book List for Leah on the Offbeat and What If It's Us
- 2020 New York Public Library Best Books for Teens for Yes No Maybe So
- 2020 Goodreads Choice Award nominee for Best Young Adult Fiction for Yes No Maybe So
- 2021 YALSA Best Fiction for Young Adults for Yes No Maybe So
- 2021 Boston Public Library Best Young Adult Book for Kate in Waiting
- 2022 YALSA Best Fiction for Young Adults for Kate in Waiting
- 2023 School Library Journal Best Young Adult Book for Imogen, Obviously
- 2023 Goodreads Choice Award nominee for Best Young Adult Fiction for Imogen, Obviously
- 2023 Chicago Public Library Best Teen Fiction for Imogen, Obviously
- 2024 American Library Association's Rainbow List for Imogen, Obviously
- 2024 American Library Association's Stonewall Honor Book for Imogen, Obviously
- 2024 New York Public Library Summer 2024 Picks for Teens for Sí, No, Tal Vez (Spanish edition of Yes No Maybe So, translated by Francisco Vogt)
