= The Upside of Unrequited =

2017 young adult novel by Becky Albertalli

- First edition
- Author: Becky Albertalli
- Language: English
- Genre: Young Adult, Romance, Drama, LGBT, Coming Of Age
- Publisher: Balzer & Bray, HarperCollins
- Publication date: April 11, 2017
- Publication place: United States
- Media type: Print (hardcover and paperback), e-book, audiobook
- Pages: 336
- ISBN: 9780062348708
- Preceded by: Simon vs. the Homo Sapiens Agenda

The Upside of Unrequited is a 2017 young-adult novel by American author Becky Albertalli. It is her second novel and the second novel in the "Simonverse," the shared universe in which Albertalli's books take place.

It revolves around the insecure Molly Peskin-Suso, who has had 26 unrequited crushes. Albertalli was loosely inspired by the novel Emma by Jane Austen and the film Clueless.

The novel has been challenged due to its frank discussions and depictions of sexuality and LGBTQ+ content.

== Connection to other works by Becky Albertalli ==
Molly Peskin-Suso is the cousin of Abby Suso, who appears in the book Simon vs. the Homo Sapiens Agenda. There are references to characters from Simon vs. the Homo Sapiens Agenda and some make cameos in the book. This book is part of the “Simon-verse" along with Simon vs. the Homo Sapiens Agenda and Leah on the Offbeat.

== Synopsis ==
Molly Peskin-Suso is seventeen, and despite having had 26 crushes, has yet to have had her first kiss or romantic relationship. This is in stark contrast to her twin sister, Cassie, who has not only kissed plenty of girls, but has her first girlfriend, Mina. Meanwhile, Molly's mothers' are planning their wedding following the Supreme Court's Decision on gay marriage.

Feeling left behind, Molly sets out, with the help of Mina and Cassie, to get her first kiss. Molly finds herself between two boys. The first is Mina's best friend Will, a cute hipster boy who will bring her closer to Cassie. The second is her nerdy co-worker, Reid, who liked antiques and Cadbury Mini Eggs. Molly must then figure out which of these two boys she wants to be with.

== Characters ==
- Molly Peskin-Suso: Seventeen-year-old protagonist with 26 unrequited crushes. She is described as being introverted and crafty.
- Cassie Peskin-Suso: Molly's twin sister who is the extroverted twin and a lesbian.
- Mina Choi: Cassie's girlfriend who is Korean-American and pansexual. She is more outgoing than either Cassie or Molly.
- Will: Mina's best friend.
- Reid Wertheim: Molly's co-worker who likes Game of Thrones and Cadbury Mini Eggs.
- Patricia "Patty" Peskin-Suso: Molly, Cassie, and Xavier's mother; a midwife
- Nadine Suso: Molly, Cassie, and Xavier's mother; a teacher
- Xavier: Molly and Cassie's little brother.

== Reception ==
The Young Adult Library Services Association included The Upside of Unrequited on their 2018 Best Fiction for Young Adults list.

Writing for The Booklist, Michael Cart notes that Albertalli has captured "the agonies and ecstasies of adolescent love." He also writes that Molly is a "sympathetic", although sometimes "exasperating" character. The ALA includes the book on its 2018 Best List.

NPR's Caitlyn Paxson writes that The Upside of Unrequited is a "snappy romance" and "fresh, snarky, and poignant." She highlights that its strength is in the characters and diverse cast. She also states that Molly is relatable and the story is timeless, minus the pop culture references.

=== Book banning and censorship ===
In 2023, The Upside of Unrequited was removed from middle-school libraries in New Jersey's Sparta School District. The Sparta Board of Education voted to have the book removed in a 5–2 vote after a parent complaint. The board cited the book's use of words like "orgy" and "sex" as basis for its banning. A petition of over 500 signatures was compiled by local residents to repeal the ban, but the school board stands behind the ban.

The Upside of Unrequited has been banned from school districts in Florida including Clay County, Escambia County, and Flagler County due to its themes of sexuality and LGBTQ+ content.

Reader's Digest features The Upside of Unrequited as one of America's most banned books of 2023.

== Film ==
The film rights were acquired by UK production company Shakespeare Sisters. It was written and directed by Hillary Shakespeare and Anna-Elizabeth Shakespeare, with Albertalli joining as executive producer. In July 2024, Variety reported Ayvan Williams, Jessica Belkin, and Savannah Lee Smith were set to portray the principal cast, with the film entering production summer 2024. Later in July, Deadline reported that Siena Agudong, Luke Eisner, Noah Lomax, Patrick Luwis, and Matthew Sato joined the cast.
