= Joe Kort =

American psychotherapist and sexologist

Joe Kort (born 1963) is an American psychotherapist, clinical social worker, board-certified clinical sexologist, author, lecturer and facilitator of therapeutic workshops. He works as Clinical Director and founder of The Center for Relationship and Sexual Health in Royal Oak, Michigan.

Kort established his private practice in 1985, specializing in LGBTQIA Affirmative Therapy, mixed-orientation marriages and relationships, male sexual fluidity issues, sexual addiction, sexual abuse, and Imago Relationship Therapy.

His work also focuses on out-of-control sexual behaviors (OCSB)/sex addiction, Relationship Problems and Marital Conflict, Sex Therapy, and Sexual Identity Concerns, Depression, Anxiety and Post Traumatic Stress Disorder. He also is trained in EMDR (Eye Movement Desensitization Reprocessing).

He is the author of four books and numerous journal and magazine articles. He is also the host of Smart Sex, Smart Love, a podcast series (www.smartsexsmartlove.com).

His practice is located in Royal Oak, Michigan. He works with clients from all over the Metro Detroit area. Kort also conducts long-distance coaching and consultation.

== Education ==
Kort obtained his undergraduate degree from Michigan State University in East Lansing, Michigan, with a dual major in psychology and social work. He earned master’s degrees in social work and psychology from Wayne State University in Detroit, Michigan, and a doctorate (PhD) in Clinical Sexology from the American Academy of Clinical Sexologists.

== Career ==
Kort is the founder and clinical director of The Center for Relationship and Sexual Health in Royal Oak, Michigan. Kort specializes in marital problems and conflicts; mixed orientation marriages; male sexuality and sexual health concerns; "sex addiction", out-of-control sexual behaviors; sexual identity issues; childhood sexual abuse; LGBTQIA Affirmative Therapy; and Imago Relationship Therapy.

Kort was a part of the teaching faculty at University of Michigan Sexual Health Certificate Program on LGBT issues from 2014-2019.

=== Media ===
Kort was a featured guest on The Montel Williams Show and The Tyra Banks Show talk shows on the topic of mixed-orientation marriages. Kort was also a guest on Oprah and Friends Radio "Better in Bed" with Laura Berman, discussing straight men who have sex with men.

== Activism ==
Kort's career focuses on advancing the social acceptance, and professional treatment of the gay, lesbian, bisexual and transgender communities. His first book, 10 Smart Things Gay Men Can Do to Improve Their Lives (2003, Alyson Books) gave answers to the most common questions his clients brought to him. Kort came out with a second edition in 2016. This book has been updated and revised and includes a new chapter on the sexual health of gay men which replaces the chapter on sexual addiction. The old Chapter 5, "Avoid or Overcome Sexual Addiction", has been replaced by "Explore Erotic Turn-ons and Sexual Interests". It also reflects the contemporary culture of gay men in social media, marriage equality and updated information on HIV.

Kort advocates for men who have sex with men (MSM), particularly heterosexual men who engage in sexual behavior with other men and are not gay or bisexual. The term "down low" specifically addresses African-American males secretly engaging in sexual behavior with other men. Kort has expanded the awareness of down-low behavior to apply beyond men of color and writes about this sexual behavior crossing all ethnicities, races, religions and socioeconomics.

While many gay men consider themselves either top, bottom or versatile, the term side has been proposed and coined by Joe Kort for gay men who are not interested in anal sex.

== Personal life ==
Kort met his partner, Mike, in 1993, and they religiously married under Reform Judaism in 2000 and legally married in 2005 in Massachusetts. The New York Times quoted him as saying, "For many young gay men today, settling down in a relationship in their 20s—or getting married if they live in Massachusetts—will feel like a very natural thing to do."

In addition to identifying as gay, Kort also identifies as "homoflexible", stating that "as I get older, I find myself noticing women in sexual ways more than I ever have before." Kort is Jewish.

== Publications ==
- 10 Smart Things Gay Men Can Do to Improve Their Lives (ISBN 1-55583782-4)
- 10 Smart Things Gay Men Can Do to Improve Their Lives; Second edition
- 10 Smart Things Gay Men Can Do to Find Real Love (ISBN 1-55583898-7)
- Gay Affirmative Psychotherapy for the Straight Clinician (ISBN 0393704971)
- Is My Husband Straight, Gay, or Bi? (ISBN 1442223251: Rowman & Littlefield Publishers, 2014.)
- "Sexual aftereffects in male survivors of childhood sexual abuse: orientation confusion, compulsions, kinky sexual interests, and dysfunctions" a chapter in Understanding the Sexual Betrayal of Boys and Men: The Trauma of Sexual Abuse (ISBN 1138942227)
- LGBTQ Clients in Therapy: Clinical Issues and Treatment Strategies(ISBN 1324000481: W. W. Norton & Company; 1 edition (February 20, 2018))
- Erotic Orientation: Helping Couples and Individuals Understand Their Sexual Lives (ISBN 0997389850)
- Cracking the Erotic Code: Helping Gay Men Understand Their Sexual Fantasies (ISBN 0997389834)
- LGBTQ Clients in Therapy: Clinical Issues and Treatment Strategies (ISBN 9781324000488)
- Understanding the Sexual Betrayal of Boys and Men (Psychoanalysis in a New Key Book Series) (ISBN 1138942227)
