= Strawberries & Cigarettes =

Single by Troye Sivan

from the album Love, Simon (Original Motion Picture Soundtrack) and Blue Neighbourhood: Ten Years On
- Released: 16 March 2018
- Recorded: 2015
- Genre: Pop
- Length: 3:21
- Label: UMA Australia
- Songwriters: Troye Sivan Mellet; Jack Antonoff; Alex Hope
- Producer: Jack Antonoff

Troye Sivan singles chronology
"The Good Side" (2018)	"Strawberries & Cigarettes" (2018)	"Bloom" (2018)

"Strawberries & Cigarettes" is a song by Australian singer-songwriter Troye Sivan, released on 16 March 2018 as the third and final single from the Love, Simon soundtrack. The song was originally written for Sivan's debut album, Blue Neighbourhood (2015), and was later included on the tenth anniversary edition released in 2026.

At the 23rd Satellite Awards, the song was nominated for Satellite Award for Best Original Song.

== Critical reception ==
Fuse called the song "an immediate standout from the soundtrack that will remind you of the first time you ever fell in love" adding "From the romantic lyricism to the lush production, 'Strawberries & Cigarettes' is a beautifully heartbreaking tale of a fairytale-like love that is no longer." Sam Samshenas from Gay Times called it a "nostalgic pop number" and "one of Troye's best songs to date". All Things Go said "This is one of those perfect pop songs that go out to that special someone we love. Though heavily layered with studio magic, Troye's vocals stand out the most, serenading with the warmth of true love."

== Charts ==
Weekly chart performance for "Strawberries & Cigarettes"
Chart (2022)	Peak position
Indonesia (Billboard)	24

== Certifications ==
Region	Certification	Certified units/sales
Australia (ARIA)	Platinum	70,000^{‡}
Brazil (Pro-Música Brasil)	2× Platinum	80,000^{‡}
Canada (Music Canada)	Platinum	80,000^{‡}
New Zealand (RMNZ)	Gold	15,000^{‡}
United States (RIAA)	Gold	500,000^{‡}
^{‡} Sales+streaming figures based on certification alone.
