= Top, bottom, and versatile =

Positions during sexual activity

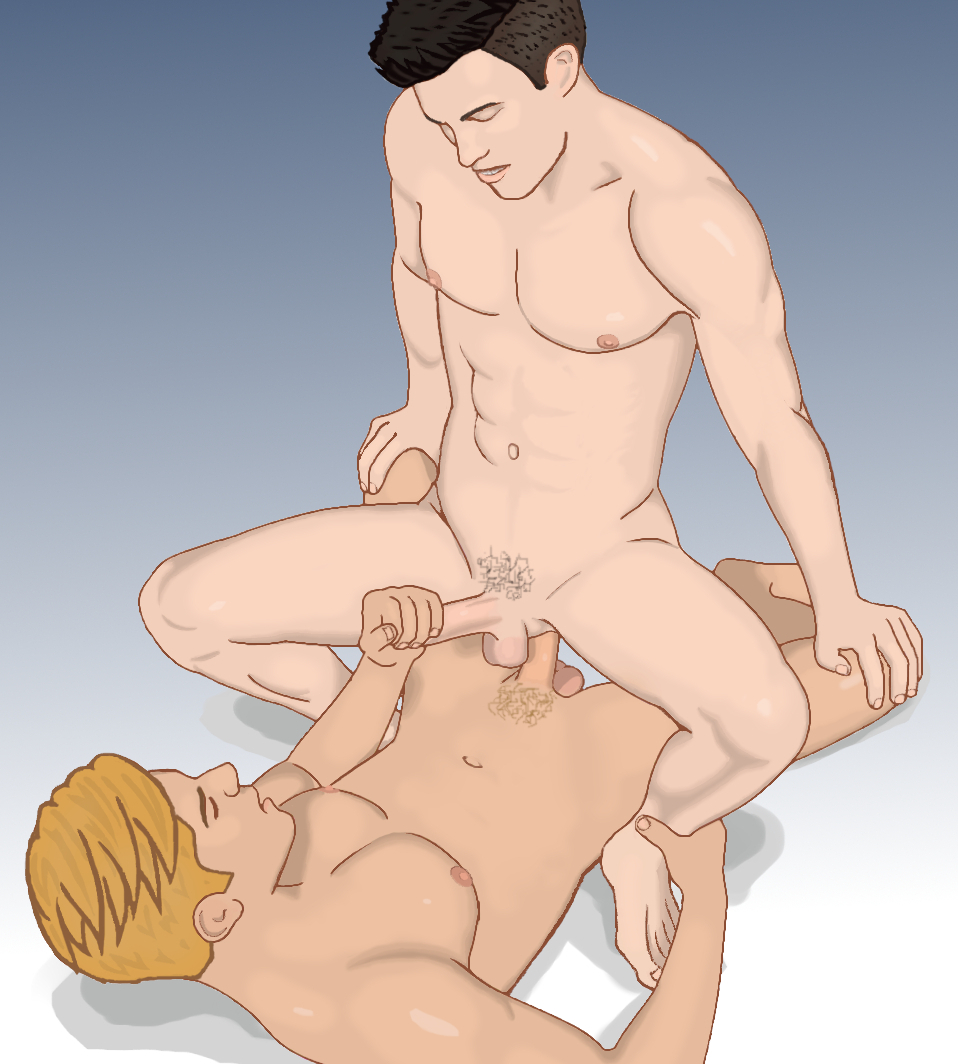
Contrary to their physical positions, for the "top, bottom, and versatile" sexual position, the man lying on his back is said to be in the "top position" and the other man is said to be in the "bottom position"

In human sexuality, top, bottom, and versatile are roles during sexual activity, especially between two (or more) males. A top is usually a person who penetrates, a bottom is usually one who receives penetration, and someone who is versatile engages in both roles. These terms may be elements of self-identity that indicate an individual's usual preference and habits, but might also describe broader sexual identities and social roles.

The terms top and bottom do not refer to the literal physical position during sex. For men who have sex with men and do not engage in anal sex, the term "side" has been used. Side men do not engage in anal sex but rather enjoy non-penetrative sex.

== Top ==
A top is usually a person who engages in the penetrative role during sexual activity; for men who have sex with men (MSM), this often involves penetration using the penis during anal and oral sex. Top is also used as a verb meaning "to penetrate another." Top may also describe a broader personal identity involving the display of dominance and authority in a romantic or sexual relationship; however, this stipulation is not a requisite element of being a top.

Several related terms exist. With regard to gay male sexuality, a total top or pure top is one who assumes an exclusively penetrative role for sex. A power top is one noted for their great skills or aggressiveness in penetrating their bottoms. Increasingly the term rough top is used on apps such as Grindr to describe a dominant top who penetrates with particular aggression often as a show of masculinity and power, and to let the submissive bottom know they are being sodomized hard as a way to psychologically humiliate them. A service top is "one who tops under the direction of an eager bottom," or is submissive while being the one who penetrates. A versatile top is one who prefers to top but who bottoms occasionally, colloquially, a soft top. The terms penetrative partner or giver are synonyms of top, created to describe the act of penetrating without implying non-egalitarian relations among participants.

== Bottom ==
A bottom is usually the receptive partner during sexual penetration. This frequently refers to MSM who are penetrated via the anus during anal sex. Bottom is also used as a verb meaning "to be penetrated by another, whether anally or orally." Bottom may also describe a wider social context of submission within a romantic or sexual relationship, though this element does not apply to all people who prefer to bottom. For example, a power bottom may refer to someone who takes a more dominant role while being the receptive partner.

In gay male sexuality, a total bottom is someone who assumes an exclusively receptive role during anal or oral intercourse. A versatile bottom is one who prefers to bottom but who tops occasionally. The terms receiver or receptive partner may be preferred by some. An oral bottom is the exclusively receptive partner in oral sex, providing the penetrative partner, or oral top, with unreciprocated fellatio or irrumatio.

== Versatile ==
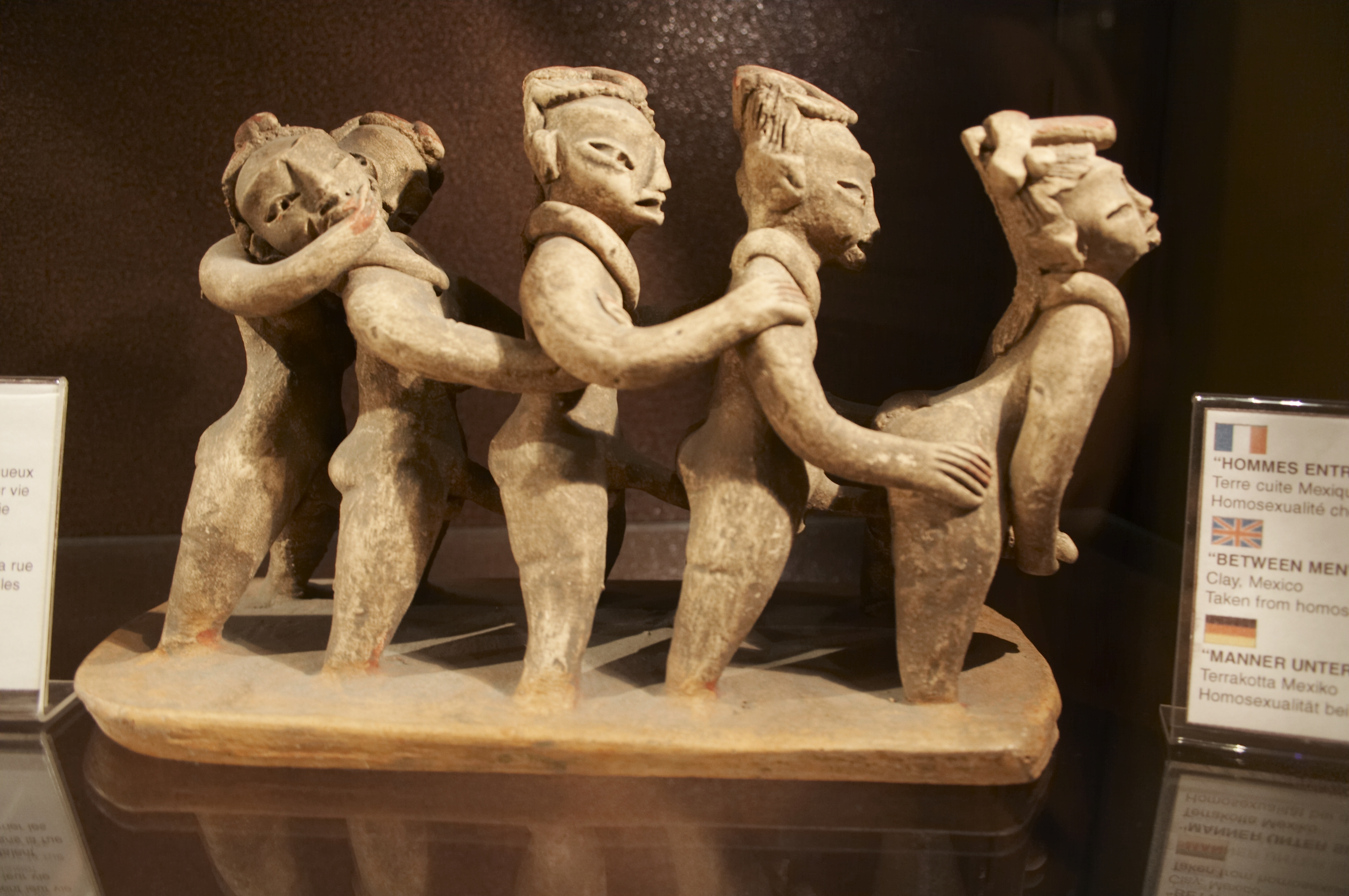
Group sex where all men but the first and the last are versatile

Versatile, or vers, refers to a person who enjoys both topping and bottoming and may alternate between the two in sexual situations. Flip-flop or flip fuck commonly describes switching from top to bottom during one sexual encounter between two men. Each participant penetrates the other and is penetrated in his turn. Versatility is a concept of lifestyle. Versatility, though, is not limited to the simple acts of anal or oral penetration, but also includes the splitting of duties and responsibilities in the relationship.

The reciprocal scenario, where both men take turns fucking each other, is often exercised as a celebration of equality. What sets this scenario apart from the others is the versatility of the men involved. Versatility is a unique and important feature of male anal sex. Some men consider it liberating; ... Versatility to them is akin to speaking two different languages. It requires a special kind of playfulness, creativity, curiosity, and coordination.

— Steven G. Underwood, Gay Men and anal eroticism: tops, bottoms, and versatiles, Harrington Park Press, 2003

According to some, living a versatile lifestyle implies a certain openness to new things and an opposition to labels, stereotypes and generalizations. Therefore, this concept differs from heterosexual relationships where sexual compatibility does not begin with guessing who will end up as top or bottom. In self descriptions of men seeking sex with other men, they may refer to themselves as a versatile tops or versatile bottoms in addition to using other terms.

== Side ==
The term side was coined in 2013 in an article by psychotherapist and sexologist Joe Kort for gay men who are not interested in anal sex. In the article, Kort offered this definition: "Sides prefer to kiss, hug and engage in oral sex, rimming, mutual masturbation and rubbing up and down on each other, to name just a few of the sexual activities they enjoy. These men enjoy practically every sexual practice aside from anal penetration of any kind."

The term has gained increasingly broad acceptance since then. In May 2022, the gay dating app Grindr added "Side" as a position option and other apps have subsequently followed suit. In Brazil, this concept is known as gouine, while the term gouinage is used to refer to non-penetrative sex; gouine was originally a term used by French-speaking lesbians, meaning "dyke". In Spanish-speaking countries, men who engage in non-penetrative sex have adopted the term neutro (or rol neutro, literally "neutral role").

== Health and safety ==
The bottom, or receptive partner carries a higher risk of exposure to sexually transmitted diseases (STDs) and certain bacterial infections. The lining of the anus is delicate and can more easily tear than other tissues, which often create easier pathways for infections to enter the body. Unlike the vagina, the anus does not self-lubricate so using artificial lubrication is usually encouraged to help prevent serious injury and pain.

== Prevalence ==
A tally of 55,464 profiles on gay.com from the United States showed that 26.46% preferred top, while 31.92% preferred bottom, and the largest group (41.62%) preferred versatile. The preferences seemed to vary by state, however. In Wyoming, for example, 16% preferred top, 44% preferred bottom, and 40% preferred versatile. In West Virginia, tops outnumbered bottoms by a slim margin (32% top, 29% bottom, and 39% versatile). In Oregon, "versatile" profiles made up nearly half (48.42%). A study of the most recent sexual encounter among men who have sex with men found only 37.2% of participants had engaged in anal sex, while 72.7% had participated in oral sex and 68.4% in partnered masturbation.

== Other ==
=== General ===
In the hanky code, a person flagging the top, or active, role would wear the hanky in the left pocket, and the bottom, or passive, role on the right. Acts which were not divisible into distinct roles, however, such as "69" or "anything," followed a pattern in which one flagged interest by wearing the hanky on the left and absence of interest by wearing it on the right. Preferences that did not relate to sexual mechanics, such as uniform fetishism or prostitution, followed a pattern in which the seeker flagged on the right and the object of desire flagged on the left.

The cowboy position is anal sex in which the bottom straddles the top. The position is often cited as being advantageous for bottoms who are new to anal sex, as it allows the receiving partner to lower himself on to the other's penis at his own pace.

=== Alternative terminology ===
Other terms for top and bottom include active and passive, and pitcher and catcher. The intended meanings of active vs. passive in reference to oral sex can be unclear, however. Switch is sometimes used for versatile.

=== Role vs. position among sexualities ===
The terms top, bottom and versatile do not necessarily refer literally to physical position during sex. For example, if the inserting partner lies on his back and the receptive partner straddles him, the inserting partner is still considered the top, and the receptive partner the bottom, despite their reverse physical arrangement.

== See also ==
- Seme and uke: related terms in Japanese manga and anime publications and fandom
- Sex position
- The Gay Travel Guide for Tops and Bottoms
- Top, bottom, and switch: terms used in BDSM erotic practices and roleplaying
