= Simon vs. the Homo Sapiens Agenda =

2015 novel by Becky Albertalli

- First edition cover
- Author: Becky Albertalli
- Language: English
- Genre: Young Adult, Romance, Drama, LGBT, Coming Of Age
- Publisher: Balzer + Bray
- Publication date: April 7, 2015
- Publication place: United States
- Media type: Print (hardcover and paperback), e-book, audiobook
- Pages: 303
- ISBN: 978-0062348678
- Followed by: Leah on the Offbeat

Simon vs. the Homo Sapiens Agenda is a 2015 young adult novel and the debut book by American author Becky Albertalli. The coming-of-age story focuses on its titular protagonist Simon Spier, a closeted, gay, high school-aged boy who is forced to come out after a blackmailer discovers Simon's emails written to another closeted classmate with whom he has fallen in love.

Albertalli received the William C. Morris Award from the American Library Association, an annual honor for young adult literature, as well as internationally the German Youth Literature Prize. The novel was also featured on the National Book Award Longlist and listed by the Wall Street Journal as one of the Best Young Adult novels in 2015.

The name of the novel is a parody of the term "homosexual agenda", a pejorative phrase that is commonly used by opponents of gay rights in the United States. This is also a reference to a conversation between Simon and his email pen pal, in which they discuss how they believe everyone should have to come out, not just gay people, jokingly referencing the aforementioned phrase and how their own version would be "the Homo Sapiens Agenda", since it applies to everyone regardless of sexuality.

The book was adapted into a film titled Love, Simon, which was released by 20th Century Fox in the United States on March 16, 2018, and was met with critical and commercial success.

== Synopsis ==
Simon Spier is a closeted, gay, 16-year-old student in his junior year of high school with a fondness for musical theater who lives in a suburb of Atlanta, Georgia. Unbeknownst to his family and friends, Simon has been sending emails to a person going by the name of "Blue," Simon himself using the pseudonym "Jacques." As the two become closer, however, Simon's secret suddenly falls under siege; the emails sent between him and Blue are threatened to be released if he doesn't play wingman for Martin, the class clown, and coerce his friend Abby into falling in love with him. Now, his sexual orientation could be revealed and the privacy of his enigmatic digital confidante could be compromised. Simon must find a way to step out of his comfort zone before he is pushed out, and before he loses Blue, who only grows more flirtatious by the day, and whom Simon, whether by choice or not, is on the cusp of encountering in person.

== Characters ==
- Simon Spier: The 16-year-old gay protagonist who has yet to come out and is in an online relationship with a boy named "Blue". He goes by the pseudonym "Jacques", which is a reference to "Jacques a dit", the French counterpart to the widespread game Simon Says. He loves Oreos and has a passion for the music of Elliott Smith. He is fond of musical theatre and participates in his school's productions, even though he is frequently relegated to playing bit roles. He plays "Fagin's boy" in their production of Oliver!. Simon's secret e-mail that he uses to communicate with Blue is "hourtohour.notetonote", a reference to Elliott Smith lyrics.
- Bram/Blue: Bluegreen118, commonly referred to as "Blue", is the boy Simon e-mails for five months. Simon met Blue on "creeksecrets", the school Tumblr page (referred to as "the Tumblr") after Blue posted a very intuitive and relatable post about being gay. He is Jewish-Episcopalian, has divorced parents (one of whom is an English teacher, the other an epidemiologist), likes superheroes and Reese's peanut butter cups, has excellent grammar, and is a very private person. Simon relays to him his utmost secrets, which is why it is difficult to prevent Blue from knowing of Martin's threats to release their private conversations into the public domain. At first, Simon believes Blue to be a classmate of his named Cal, but after sending him a series of questions pertaining to him, most of the answers sent back are a resounding "no". However, Blue discovers Simon's identity, and thus, their e-mails to one another begin to become tense. At the end of the book, Blue is revealed to Simon to be Bram Greenfeld, a quiet kid who sits at Simon's lunch table. He plays soccer and is very smart. Simon previously thought him to be "actually kind of adorable", with "expressive brown eyes, light brown skin, soft dark curls and cute, knobbly hands", and is "actually really funny inside his head", despite his shyness. Simon previously believed that Bram liked Leah romantically.
- Nick Eisner: Simon's male best friend. Simon has known Nick since he was four. Nick has a crush on Abby and is a talented singer and guitarist, is Jewish, and plays soccer. Oftentimes, he finds himself struck by sudden philosophical moods, spinning off into existential tangents regarding rather abstruse subjects, such as the interpretations of his own dreams. Simon finds this irresistible. Nick's crush on Abby is quite obvious, with him switching seats to sit next to her at lunch, and his "lingering, lovesick eyes" that look in her general direction. He becomes Abby's boyfriend at the end of the book.
- Leah Burke: Simon's female best friend. She is described as very "deadpan" and sarcastic and is shown to bottle up her emotions. She's very good at drawing and loves manga and anime. Simon believes Leah to be in love with Nick, and believes that she dislikes Abby due to her belief that she "intruded" upon their friend group. At the end of the novel, it is revealed that Leah has been learning how to play the drums for the past two years and is part of a band called "Emoji", in which Simon's sister is the guitarist, Taylor the vocalist, Anna the bassist, and Morgan the keyboardist.
- Abby Suso: Simon's other female best friend, who moved from Washington, D.C. to Atlanta, Georgia at the beginning of the junior year. They became friends after being required, due to partner assignments dictated by student alphabetization, to work together in their homeroom class. Abby is shown to be very conventionally attractive, perky, and well-liked. She is involved in many recreational clubs hosted at the school, such as those involving student council, cheerleading, and the theater production group assisting with the school musical, in which she plays the Artful Dodger. Simon comes out to her first, raising tensions between her and Leah. She is the object of Martin's (unreciprocated) affections. She and Nick become romantically involved at the end of the book. She is a cousin of twin sisters Molly and Cassie Peskin-Suso, the protagonists of Albertalli's novel The Upside of Unrequited.
- Martin Addison: The class clown. He has floppy brown hair, has a gay brother who goes to college in DC, and plays Fagin in the school production of Oliver!. He is portrayed as a nerdy, entertaining, well-liked guy, with Simon referring to him as a sort of "mascot" for the popular kids. However, his darker aspects are revealed when he blackmails Simon into helping him get close to Abby after he discovers that Simon is gay. Martin believes Abby is interested in Simon romantically when he witnesses their platonic hugging and impulsively discloses Simon's sexuality on "creeksecrets", the Tumblr blog for their high school. After Simon is subjected to several acts of harassment driven by homophobia, Martin displays remorse for his actions, confronting Simon in a parking lot, and sending him an apologetic and heartfelt e-mail. It is revealed in the sequel novel Leah on the Offbeat that Simon and Martin have reconciled, but Simon's friends and sister still dislike him.
- Cal Price: The stage manager of the school production. Simon was once interested in him romantically. He is described as very cute, with "awesome bangs", blue-green eyes, and a Southern accent. Simon initially believes Cal to be Blue until Simon sends Blue a series of questions pertaining to Cal, of which the majority of his answers to are a resounding "no." After Simon is outed, Cal comes out to him as bisexual and expresses possible romantic interest in him, saying that they should hang out sometime, but Simon doesn't pursue it because of his feelings for Blue.
- Nora Spier: Simon's younger sister. She is a freshman. She has blonde curls and is described to be "under the radar cool". She is not very assertive and seems to be subject to peer pressure. She taught herself guitar and is part of a band called "Emoji" with Leah, Taylor, and Anna.
- Alice Spier: Simon's older sister. She is a freshman at Wesleyan University and has dirty blonde hair. Alice has a boyfriend named Theo, who, for the first half of the novel, stays secret. She reveals their relationship to her family only after Simon encourages her after he himself comes out to them.
- Jack Spier: Simon's father. He tries to be a "cool, hipster dad" but often tells homophobic jokes, much to Simon's discomfort. He is also "obsessed" with Simon's life, focusing his attention upon it frequently, which only adds to Simon's difficulty in coming out to him and his wife, Simon's mother. He and Simon's mother enjoy watching The Bachelorette, and they (along with Simon) watch Love Actually every Christmas.
- Emily Spier: Simon's mother. She is a child psychologist and seems to be incredibly involved in Simon's life, much to his annoyance.
- Taylor Metternich: Simon's fellow actor in Oliver! She plays the lead, Oliver. She is skinny and has "super brushed blonde hair". Simon describes her as a "dark side of perfection". Taylor is quite self-obsessed, often boasting about her talents and appearance. This both annoys and amuses Simon and his friends. Taylor has an intense emotional reaction to Simon's harassment following his coming out, almost physically slapping one of the perpetrators involved in his mockery. Taylor is the lead vocalist for the band "Emoji".
- Ms. Albright: Simon's "moderately badass" theater teacher. She has electric red hair and is infuriated by others' harassment of Simon following his coming out, determined to bring it to a permanent cessation.
- Garrett: A soccer player who sits at Simon's lunch table. Simon describes him as a "semi-douche". He is best friends with Bram and is romantically interested in Leah.
- Anna: Simon's ex-girlfriend. She sits at his lunch table, wears black eyeliner, and reads manga. She is the bassist for Emoji.
- Morgan: Anna's best friend. Simon believes that she and Anna are practically interchangeable. She is the keyboardist for Emoji.
- Peter: A college student who buys several drinks for Simon at an LGBT-friendly restaurant/bar. He takes a drunk Simon back to Nick and Abby when he realizes Simon is still a high schooler.
- Maddie: A girl who is a member of the student council.
- Mr. Wise: Simon's English teacher.
- Theo: Alice's boyfriend.
- Carter Addison: Martin Addison's gay brother, who is attending college.

== Special editions ==
- Love, Simon: A movie tie-in novel including a new cover featuring Nick Robinson, official stills from the set, an excerpt from the script of the opening scenes of the film, and a behind-the-scenes interview with Albertalli, Robinson, and director Greg Berlanti.
- Special Edition Hardcover: A hardcover edition including previously unseen e-mails between Simon and Blue, a behind-the-scenes scrapbook of photographs taken by Albertalli on the set of Love, Simon, and an exclusive interview between Albertalli and fellow YA authors Angie Thomas and Adam Silvera.

== Awards and nominations ==
- William C. Morris Award: Best Young Adult Debut of the Year
- National Book Award for Young People's Literature: Longlist
- Pennsylvania Young Reader's Choice Award Nominee for Young Adults
- Lincoln Award Nominee
- North Carolina Young Adult Book Award
- Eliot Rosewater Indiana High School Book Award
- Connecticut Nutmeg Award
- Oklahoma Sequoyah Book Award
- Tennessee Volunteer State Book Award
- D. C. Capitol Choices
- New Hampshire Flume Young Readers' Choice Award
- New Jersey Garden State Teen Book Award
- Virginia Readers' Choice Award
- Washington Evergreen Teen Book Award
- Wyoming Soaring Eagle Teen Book Award
- Texas Tayshas Reading List
- Georgia Peach Teen Readers' Choice Award
- Florida Teen Reads Book Award
- Vermont Green Mountain Book Award
- Goodreads Choice Award Nominee: Debut Goodreads Author
- Goodreads Choice Award Nominee: Young Adult Fiction
- Deutscher Jugendliteraturpreis in 2017

== Sequels ==
A sequel focusing on the character of Leah (set in her senior year), titled Leah on the Offbeat, was released on April 24, 2018. The novella Love Creekwood, which serves as an epilogue to both novels released prior, came out in 2020.

== Film ==
Love, Simon is the title of the film adaptation of the book. It stars Nick Robinson in the lead role, along with Katherine Langford as Leah, Alexandra Shipp as Abby, Jorge Lendeborg Jr. as Nick, Keiynan Lonsdale as Bram, and Jennifer Garner and Josh Duhamel as Simon's parents. Jack Antonoff produced the soundtrack. The film was released in the United States on March 16, 2018.

Development of the film by production studio Fox 2000 was first reported in October 2015, with Elizabeth Berger and Isaac Aptaker signed to write the screenplay. Openly gay writer, director, and television showrunner Greg Berlanti directed the film.

The film has grossed $66.3 million at the box office worldwide, against a production budget of $10–17 million.

A television series titled Love, Victor, set in the same universe as the film, premiered on June 17, 2020, on Hulu, with Robinson serving as the series' narrator.

== Book banning controversy ==
The book was banned from libraries in Davison Community Schools, Michigan, and Canyons School District, Utah. It is temporarily banned (pending investigation) in Escambia County Public Schools, Florida, and Texarkana Independent School District, Texas.
