= Beard (companion) =

American slang term

Beard is a slang term, originating in the United States, which refers to a person who is used, knowingly or unknowingly, as a date, romantic partner, or spouse, either to conceal infidelity or to conceal one's sexual orientation. The term also refers, in some areas, to anyone who acted on behalf of another, in any transaction, to conceal a person's true identity. The term can be used in heterosexual and non-heterosexual contexts but is especially used within LGBTQ culture. References to beards are seen in mainstream television and films, and other entertainment.

== History ==
The usage of the term beard, also known as lavender dating or front dating, dates to the 20th century, prior to the gay rights movements. This was at a time when homosexual relationships had not yet gained public acceptance in the Western world. Often, in the early to mid-20th century, a beard companion was used by homosexual individuals to conceal one's sexual orientation through the disguise of a heterosexual relationship. This relationship typically was between a lesbian and a gay man in an attempt to dispel rumors of homo-orientation. In some situations, such as that of Vita Sackville-West and Harold Nicolson, the pair in the beard relationship may have children together despite a lack of sexual attraction. Today, the term beard or lavender dating is used less as a result of greater acceptance of homosexuality in both the United States and Western Europe, but is still occasionally used by young individuals from traditional communities or conservative countries.

== Concealing infidelity ==
In early usage of the term, a beard scenario involved concealing infidelity in a monogamous relationship. In a typical scenario, X and Y are in a supposedly exclusive relationship, but X is actually cheating with Z. However, to prevent Y from learning about X's infidelity, W, the "beard", pretends to be paired with Z. Such a scenario is a central premise of Woody Allen's 1984 film Broadway Danny Rose. The titular talent agent is the beard, pretending to date Tina, a single woman who is actually having an affair with married singer Lou Canova, Danny's client. By posing as Tina's date, Danny can bring her to Lou's performance without drawing attention from Lou's suspicious wife. The term "beard" is a running gag, used four times (e.g., "I'm only the beard") when Tina's ex assumes Danny is Tina's previously mysterious lover.

== Concealing sexual orientation ==
Many of the reported lavender marriages of the 1920s in Hollywood, and the similar reported romantic marriage of Rock Hudson (mid-1950s), employed the same usage. In Hudson's case, Phyllis Gates acted as his beard to avert the damage that the disclosure of Hudson's homosexuality might have caused to his career.

The reputedly unconsummated 1967 marriage of actress Sondra Locke and sculptor Gordon Anderson, which lasted until Locke's death in 2018, was initially intended to mask Anderson's homosexuality and Locke's promiscuity. Locke stopped actively bearding for her husband by the mid-1970s, but kept the marriage legally intact "for tax purposes."

In a 2011 interview, Betty White stated that she often served as a beard to Liberace to counter rumors of his homosexuality.

Such relationships can cause legal and emotional issues for both parties, particularly when they end.

== See also ==
- Alter ego
- Cross-sex relationships involving LGBTQ people
- Defense mechanism
- Down-low (sexual slang)
- Dramaturgy (sociology)
- Ego-dystonic sexual orientation
- Fag hag
- Gay best friend
- He never married
- Lavender marriage
- Medieval singlewomen
- Minority stress
- Passing
- Persona (psychology)
- Pronoun game
- Shibboleth
- Stigma management
- Undercover
- Walker (escort)
