= Walker (escort) =

Male companion to women in the 1900s

Walker is a term coined by Women's Wear Daily publisher John Fairchild to describe a man, often gay, who escorts fashionable women to societal events when their husbands are disinclined to attend. The term originated to describe Jerry Zipkin, a New York real estate heir who became a sought-after confidant and advisor to New York society, and eventually became a close confidant of Nancy Reagan.

The practice of using a walker stemmed from the social undesirability in the mid-20th century of women appearing unaccompanied, and the social impossibility of gay men appearing as a couple. The arrangement allowed both parties to socialize with greater freedom. With changing social practices that removed such stigmas, the practice was dying out by the late 20th century. Publicists or agents increasingly assumed the duty of walker. It is similar in function to the eighteenth-century Cicisbeo.

== See also ==
- Beard (companion)
- Cicisbeo
