= My Husband's Not Gay =

2015 reality television special

- Genre: Reality television
- Country of origin: United States
- Original language: English

Production
- Executive producers: Eric Evangelista; Shannon Evangelista; Jonathan Partridge
- Production location: Salt Lake City, Utah
- Running time: 42 minutes
- Production company: Hot Snakes Media

Original release
- Network: TLC
- Release: January 11, 2015

My Husband's Not Gay is an American reality television special broadcast by TLC. Filmed in Salt Lake City, Utah, the one-hour special premiered on January 11, 2015. The special followed four Mormon men who are attracted to men but do not identify as gay. The special depicts one of the men's search for a wife while the other three men, who are married to women, navigate their unconventional relationships.

== Format ==
Set in Salt Lake City, Utah, the one-hour special depicted four Mormon men—Jeff, Pret, Curtis, and Tom—who, while only attracted to men, are married to or seeking a relationship with women.

== Production ==
TLC said that the couples depicted in the special "reveal the decisions they have made and speak only for themselves."

== Reception ==
A Change.org petition drew over 100,000 supporters to ask TLC to pull the program because, "TLC is ... sending the message that being gay is something that can and ought to be changed, or that you should reject your sexual orientation by marrying someone of the opposite sex." Objectors stated that by airing a television special about this belief, TLC was implicitly endorsing it, a form of bigotry.

My Husband's Not Gay drew sharp criticism from advocacy groups, including the media monitoring organizations GLAAD and Truth Wins Out (TWO).
