= Timeline of LGBTQ Mormon history in the 2010s =

This is a timeline of LGBTQ Mormon history in the 2010s, part of a series of timelines consisting of events, publications, and speeches about LGBTQ individuals, (Note: LGBTQ is an initialism for lesbian, gay, bisexual, transgender and queer or questioning which functions as an umbrella term broadly referring to all sexualities, romantic orientations, sex characteristics, and gender identities that are not heterosexual, heteroromantic, cisgender, or endosex.) topics around sexual orientation and gender minorities, and the community of members of the Church of Jesus Christ of Latter-day Saints (LDS Church).

== Timeline ==
=== 2010 ===
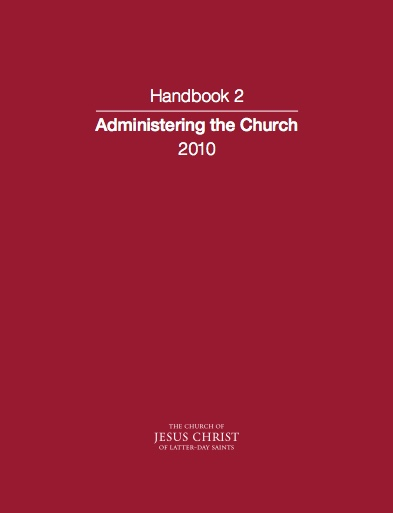
Cover of a 2010 LDS Handbook

- 2010 – The 2010 edition of the Church Handbook noted that the records of adult members who have participated in "repeated homosexual activities" would be permanently annotated. It also advised that those who have "participated in homosexual activity during or after the last three teenage years will not normally be considered for missionary service." The Handbook 2 also states if members who "feel same-gender attraction but do not engage in any homosexual behavior" may receive church callings and hold temple recommends and serve full-time proselytizing missions.
- 2010 – A queer-straight alliance, USGA, began meeting on BYU campus to discuss topics relating to homosexuality and the LDS Church. By the end of 2012, USGA was banned from meeting on BYU campus.
- January – The documentary 8: The Mormon Proposition on LDS involvement with California's 2008 Proposition 8 debuts at Utah's Sundance Film Festival.
- May – Mormon Doctrine by Bruce R. McConkie went out of print. First published in 1958, the book described homosexuality as a tool used by Lucifer to lead souls to hell.
- August – Proposition 8 was ruled unconstitutional by a federal court in Perry v. Schwarzenegger. The decision was upheld by the Ninth Circuit Court of Appeals in February 2012 and later upheld again by the U.S. Supreme Court in June 2013.
- September – BYU student Cary Crall published an article in the BYU Daily Universe that explained why California’s Proposition 8 was recently overturned in federal court, stating that the religious freedom arguments weren’t strong enough. The next day, the Daily Universe removed the article from its web edition and issued a statement saying they received complaints over the article being “offensive”.
- September – Keith B. McMullin of the Presiding Bishopric addressed the 20th Evergreen International annual conference and counseled that if someone says they are homosexual, lesbian, or gay that they should be corrected since it is "simply not true" and God "doesn't speak of His children this way". He further teaches that the "such limitations" as same-gender attraction won't exist after death, though it is not "in and of itself ... neither evil nor sinful".
- September – In a special meeting for some Oakland, California members it was reported that general authority seventy and historian Marlin K. Jensen apologized to straight and gay members for their pain from the California Proposition 8 campaign and some other church actions around homosexuality.
- September – John Donald Gustav-Wrathall published Why Theology Can't Save Us, And Other Essays on Being Gay and Mormon, a collection of writings exploring his experience as both an active Latter-day Saint and a man in a committed same-sex relationship.
- October – Boyd K. Packer delivered an October conference address stating that the Family Proclamation "qualifies according to the definition as a revelation". After referencing "Satan's many substitutes or counterfeits for marriage", he states "some suppose that they were pre-set and cannot overcome what they feel are inborn tendencies toward the impure and unnatural. Not so! Why would our Heavenly Father do that to anyone? Remember, he is our father." His characterization of same-sex physical attractions as "impure and unnatural" tendencies that can be "overcome" sparked a protest of thousands of individuals on October 7 which surrounded Temple Square. Packer later altered his words in the print version of his speech to say "Some suppose that they were preset and cannot overcome what they feel are inborn temptations toward the impure and unnatural. Not so! Remember, God is our Heavenly Father". His written talk was also altered to refer to the Family Proclamation as a "guide" instead of a "revelation".
- October – First Presidency member Dieter F. Uchtdorf stated on the origin of homosexuality that "Many questions in life, however, including some related to same-gender attractions, must await a future answer, even in the next life."
- October – In response to a petition from the Human Rights Campaign after the suicides of several bullied gay young men the church released a statement condemning unkindness towards those attracted to the same sex.

=== 2011 ===
- 2011 – The church website Mormon.org published a member profile with the headline, "I'm Gay. I'm a Mormon" as part of its 2010 "I'm a Mormon" campaign. Members were encouraged to create Mormon.org profiles. The profile disappeared from the archives, however, after early 2015.
- 2011 – The ninth version of the "For the Strength of Youth" pamphlet was released adding to the paragraph on homosexuality that "lesbian behavior" is also a "serious sin" and that the youth should speak to their parents and bishop if they "are being persuaded to participate in inappropriate behavior".
- January – The 28-year-old Mormon John Joe Thomas stated that he had beaten a 70-year-old man to death with rocks because God had told him to, citing scripture on stoning homosexual men in the Bible's Old Testament. He alleged that the mentally-delayed Murray Seidman had made sexual advances on him. Earlier, Thomas had befriended Seidman, and baptized him into the local Philadelphia LDS congregation, and eventually became the sole beneficiary of Seidman's will.
- January – A BYU law student published the book Homosexuality: A Straight BYU Student's Perspective containing arguments in favor of same-sex marriage for which he stated he was threatened with expulsion.
- February – The church's BYU Honor Code was updated to remove the ban on any "advocacy of homosexual behavior" defined as "promoting homosexual relations as being morally acceptable".
- March – Celibate gay Mormon Drew Call was denied his temple recommend renewal and fired from his LDS church printing office job for refusing to give up his gay friends.
- March – The Book of Mormon debuted on Broadway. Among other church teachings, the musical satirized church teachings on gay people being able to suppress their feelings.
- August – The Mormon Mental Health Podcast was launched by LDS sex therapist Natasha Helfer. The podcast includes many episodes relating the experiences of LGBTQ Latter-day Saints.
- August – Voices of Hope: Latter-day Saint Perspectives on Same Gender Attraction – An Anthology of Gospel Teachings and Personal Essays, compiled by Ty Mansfield, is published by Deseret Book. The book is a collection of writings by Latter-day Saint scholars, and it features stories by gay members.
- September – Mitch Mayne receives media coverage for being an out gay men serving in a high-profile position as secretary to the bishop.
- September – Affirmation held its annual international conference in the Kirtland, Ohio historic Mormon temple which was reported by many as an important moment.
- September – In a devotional for young adults at BYU, Dallin H. Oaks gave a talk titled “Truth and Tolerance”, in which he talked about how “evil acts that used to be localized and covered up like a boil are now legalized and paraded like a banner.”
- November – The first annual, 3-day Circling the Wagons conference was held in Salt Lake City as a nexus for sharing LGBTQ Mormons experiences, drawing over 300 attendees of diverse religious views. The conference was repeated in 2012, 2014, 2015, and 2016, with 2012 regional conferences held in D.C. and San Francisco.
- November – BYU fired a gay broadcasting department faculty member named Kendall Wilcox. Wilcox stated that BYU had become an increasingly hostile work environment and that being gay played into his being fired. He later released a documentary about being gay in the church titled "Far Between".

=== 2012 ===
- 2012 – An anonymously authored article was published on the church's website in which a man describes how he lived a "homosexual lifestyle" (engaged in same-sex dating) for a time, but then through counseling with Family Services and local bishop he was able to manage his burden, or struggle, with same-sex attraction. He stated that he was blessed with an alleviation of the intensity of feelings and knows of some people whose burden was lifted and "overcame" same-sex attraction, and no longer experience those feelings. He later married a woman, but states that marriage is not a "cure" for the challenge of same-sex attractions.

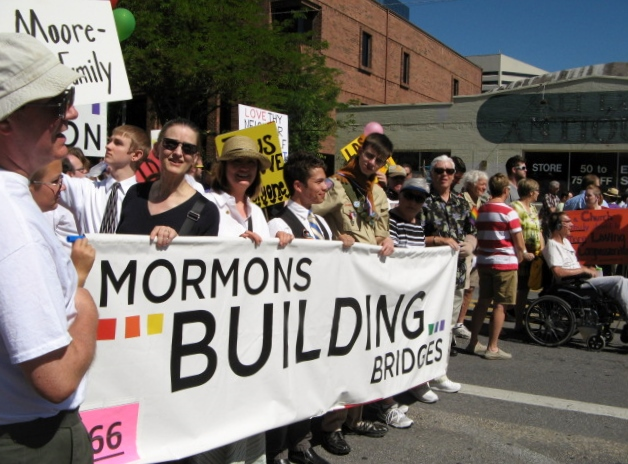
Mormons Building Bridges, a pro-LGBTQ group at a gay pride march

- 2012 – Mormons Building Bridges was founded.
- January – An edition of the church's New Era magazine for teens addressed a question on whether having friends with homosexual feelings was okay. It advised members to choose friends carefully who have similar values since homosexual behavior violates God's commandments, and that the church condemns the immoral behavior but not the person.
- March – The BYU LGBTQ group USGA published a series of videos titled It Gets Better. The videos feature LGBTQ students sharing their experiences.
- May – The church released a statement approving the Boy Scouts of America (BSA) administration's decision to remove the ban on homosexual youth (which had been made an official policy in 1991). The church's release stated, "sexual orientation has not previously been—and is not now—a disqualifying factor for boys who want to join [LDS] Scout troops", and that "young men ... who agree to abide by Church standards" (which bar any sexual activity) are allowed to participate. The church's policy, however, remains unclear for young men participating in any same-sex dating without sexual activity. The church's agreement with the BSA policy change was important because Mormon scouts constituted the largest group of young men in the BSA (21% in 2010).
- June – Josh Weed a licensed therapist from Seattle married to a woman came out as gay in a widely publicized blog post. He and his wife came out in support of same-sex marriage in 2015 when quotes from them were used without permission in an amicus brief opposing it ahead of the oral arguments in the Supreme Court Obergefell v. Hodges case.
- June – The Family Acceptance Project published the first evidence-based guide for Mormon parents wanting to support their LGBTQ children.
- June – Benji Schwimmer, Latter-day Saint and winner of the second season of So You Think You Can Dance, came out as gay. He later left the church and criticized the church’s LGBTQ policies.
- October – The apostle Oaks stated that members should assume that children of same-sex couples face the same disadvantages of single and unmarried parents. He also said that youth "struggling with any exceptional condition, including same-gender attraction" need loving and understanding.
- November – North Star launched the Voices of Hope video series. Each video features the story of a gay Latter-day Saint who chooses to remain in the church and not pursue a same-sex relationship.
- November – Companions (Nich’ooni) was published by Jed Bryan. The book tells the fictional story of two homosexual companions who are called by the church to preach to Navajo people in Arizona. Two sequels were later published.
- November – The Hero’s Journey of the Gay and Lesbian Mormon was published by Carol Lynn Pearson. The book discusses the journey of development and growth experienced by LGBTQ people and their loved ones.
- November – The Reconciling Faith and Feelings Conference, sponsored by the Association of Mormon Counselors and Psychotherapists (AMCAP), Evergreen, Foundation for Attraction Research, and North Star, was held in Provo. It was repeated in November 2013.

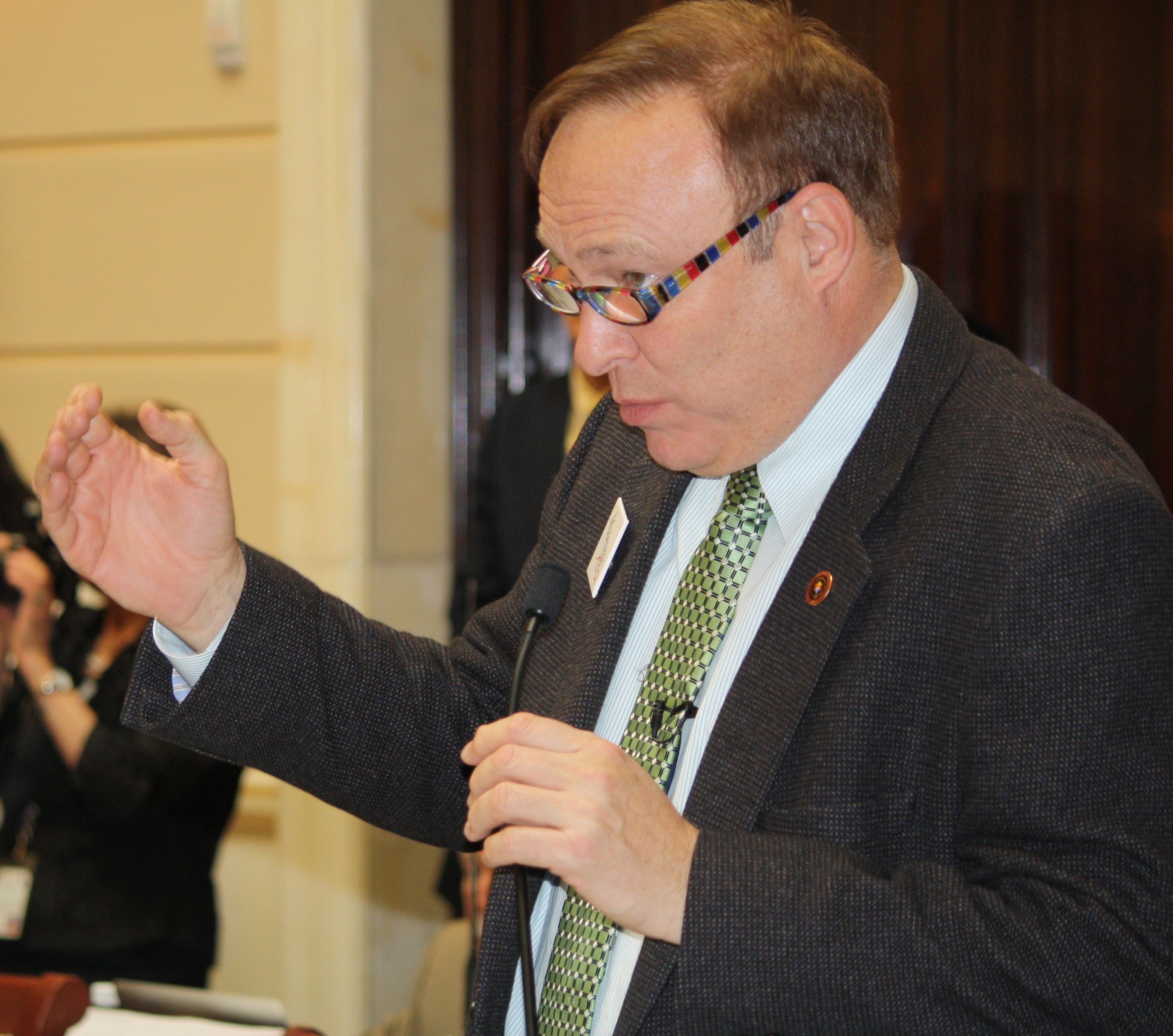
Senator Dabakis sporting rainbow pride glasses in 2013

- December – Jim Dabakis, a former Mormon who had attended BYU in the 70s, and came out at as gay at the age of 23, was elected to the Utah State Senate.

This header was at the top of the LDS church's first official website on homosexuality from December 2012 until an update in October 2016.

- December – The church launched the website titled Love One Another: A Discussion on Same-Sex Attraction at mormonsandgays.org in December "in an effort to encourage understanding and civil conversation about same-sex attraction." The website states that "individuals do not choose to have such attractions".
- December – The Gay Mormon Stories podcast series was started as an extension of the Mormon Stories podcast by John Dehlin. In 2019, the series was renamed to the Latter Gay Stories podcast hosted by Kyle Ashworth.
- December – LDS public affairs leader Bill Evans met with several high-profile LGBTQ activists in Salt Lake City at the Alta Club including the national Human Rights Campaign director, Dustin Lance Black, Bruce Bastian, the Utah Pride Center director, and the director of Mormons Building Bridges.

=== 2013 ===
- 2013 – Mama Dragons started as a group of 8 Latter-day Saint women with LGBTQ children. They provide support groups and workshops for parents with LGBTQ children.
- 2013 – Ty Mansfield, a Mormon man who described himself as almost exclusively attracted to men but married to a woman, taught two religion classes in the summer of 2013 at Brigham Young University as an adjunct faculty member.
- 2013 – Arizona LDS LGBTQ (All), a support group for people navigating both Latter-day Saint and LGBTQ identities, was founded in Arizona.
- January – Latter-Gay Saints: An Anthology of Gay Mormon Fiction was published with Gerald S. Argetsinger as editor. The book compiles a series of short stories that illustrate the experience of LGBTQ Latter-day Saints.
- January – General authority seventy Tad R. Callister stated in a speech at BYU-I reprinted in the Ensign that the church's views on same-sex sexual behavior is eternal doctrine and not a temporary policy. He additionally alluded to homosexual feelings as a weakness or imperfection for which those with those tendencies must do all they can to use the refining power of the atonement to convert into a strength through the atonement.
- February – Gay BYU student Jimmy Hales gained media attention with a comedic video of coming out live to family and friends.
- March – Dale Larsen was interviewed at North Star as one of the first former bishops to publicly come out as gay. Since then, more former bishops have talked about being LGBTQ at North Star.
- April – Leaders of the Community of Christ church voted to allow same-sex marriage and LGBTQ clergy in the United States.
- April – Reborn That Way was published by Laurie Campbell, a Latter-day Saint woman who left lesbian relationships and married a man. Campbell’s story was featured on the original Mormon and Gay website.
- July – The Southern Poverty Law Center published an article listing various “anti-gay” groups seeking to influence politics in foreign countries, such as the World Congress of Families. The article also drew connections between some of these groups and Latter-day Saints. This was followed a year later by a response article from Paul Mero in the Salt Lake Tribune, stating that the “World Congress of Families is not a hate group”.
- September – Apostle Russell M. Nelson gave a September CES devotional in which he discussed the "debate", "skirmish", and "controversy" around whether "two people of the same gender can be married". He admonished members to gain understanding of the church's position through prayer, pondering, and listening to conference, as well as memorizing and repeating the words of a hymn.

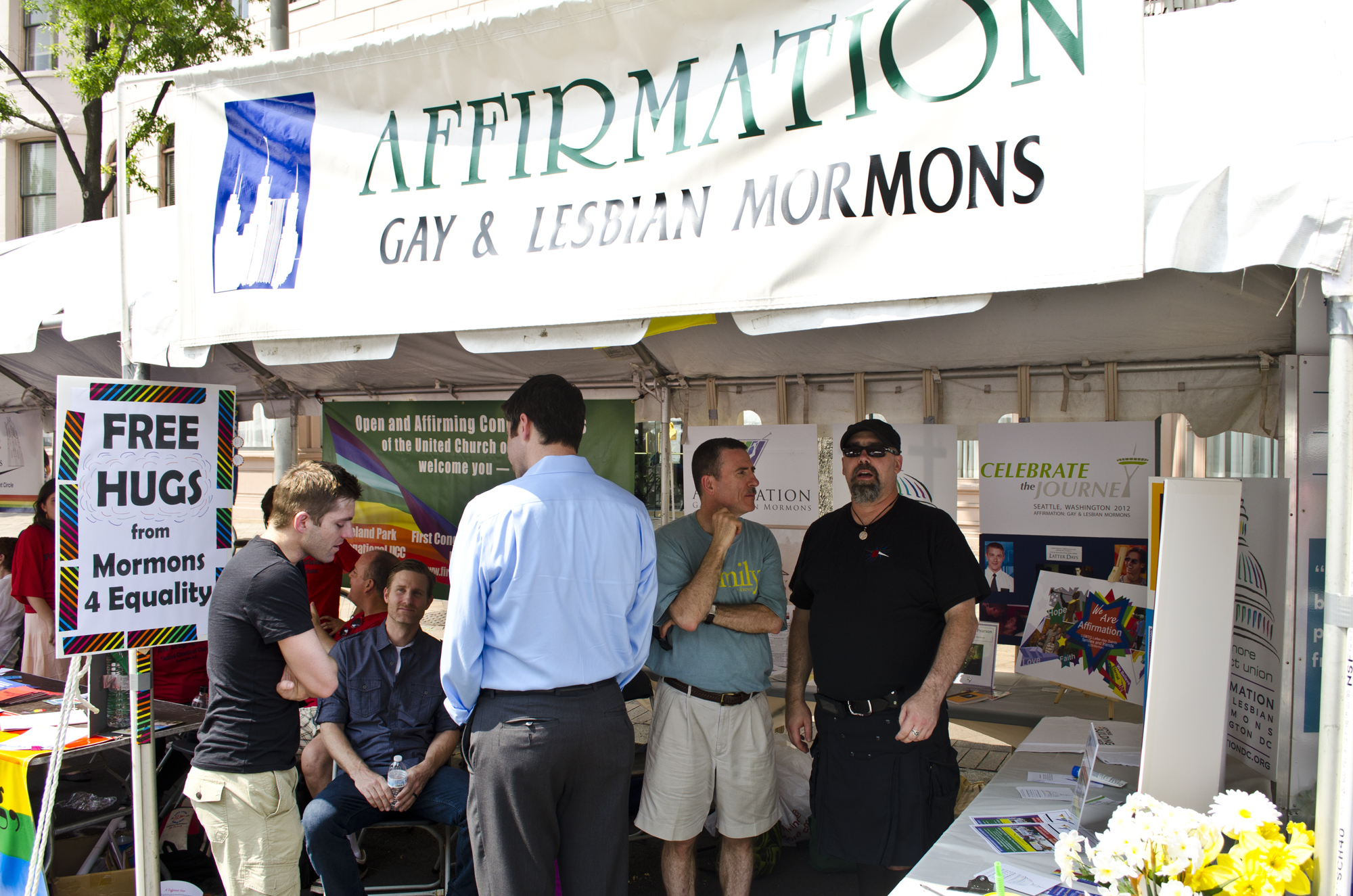
Affirmation booth at the 2013 Washington, D.C. Capital Pride street festival

- October – Elder Russell M. Nelson gave a talk in General Conference reiterating the church’s stance on traditional marriage and gender. In the talk, he says “Marriage between a man and a woman is fundamental to the Lord’s doctrine and crucial to God’s eternal plan. Marriage between a man and a woman is God’s pattern for a fulness of life on earth and in heaven. God’s marriage pattern cannot be abused, misunderstood, or misconstrued… Regardless of what civil legislation may be enacted, the doctrine of the Lord regarding marriage and morality cannot be changed. Remember: sin, even if legalized by man, is still sin in the eyes of God!”
- December – Same-sex marriages became legally recognized in Utah, and within two hours the first same-sex couple was married. They were two former Mormons, medical researcher Michael Ferguson and historian Seth Anderson.
- December – Leisha and Amanda LaCrone became the first same-sex couple married in San Pete County, Utah, after being denied the day before. They came from LDS backgrounds, and later reported being harassed by LDS leaders over a disciplinary council in 2016.

=== 2014 ===
- 2014 – An Old Testament student manual was released stating that homosexual behavior was one of the grievous sins widely accepted and practiced in the biblical cities of Sodom and Gomorrah leading to their destruction. The manual further discusses homosexuality and encourages members with gay feelings to "avoid lusting".
- January – Evergreen International shuts down and transfers its resources to North Star.
- January – A letter on same-sex marriage was sent to all congregational leaders to be shared with members. The letter reiterated church stances and urged members to review the Family Proclamation and called for "kindness and civility" for supporters of same-sex marriage. It also stated that everyone is welcome in LDS chapels as long as they "respect our standards of conduct while there".
- February - Transmormon was released as a short documentary about Eri Hayward, a transgender Latter-day Saint who grew up in Utah. The film talks about Hayward’s transition to female and the support from her family.
- February – An amicus brief was filed by the church with the US Tenth Circuit Court in defense of Utah's recently overturned Amendment 3 banning same-sex marriage in the state. The brief summarized the church's stance on marriage while stating that the church held no "anti-homosexual animus".

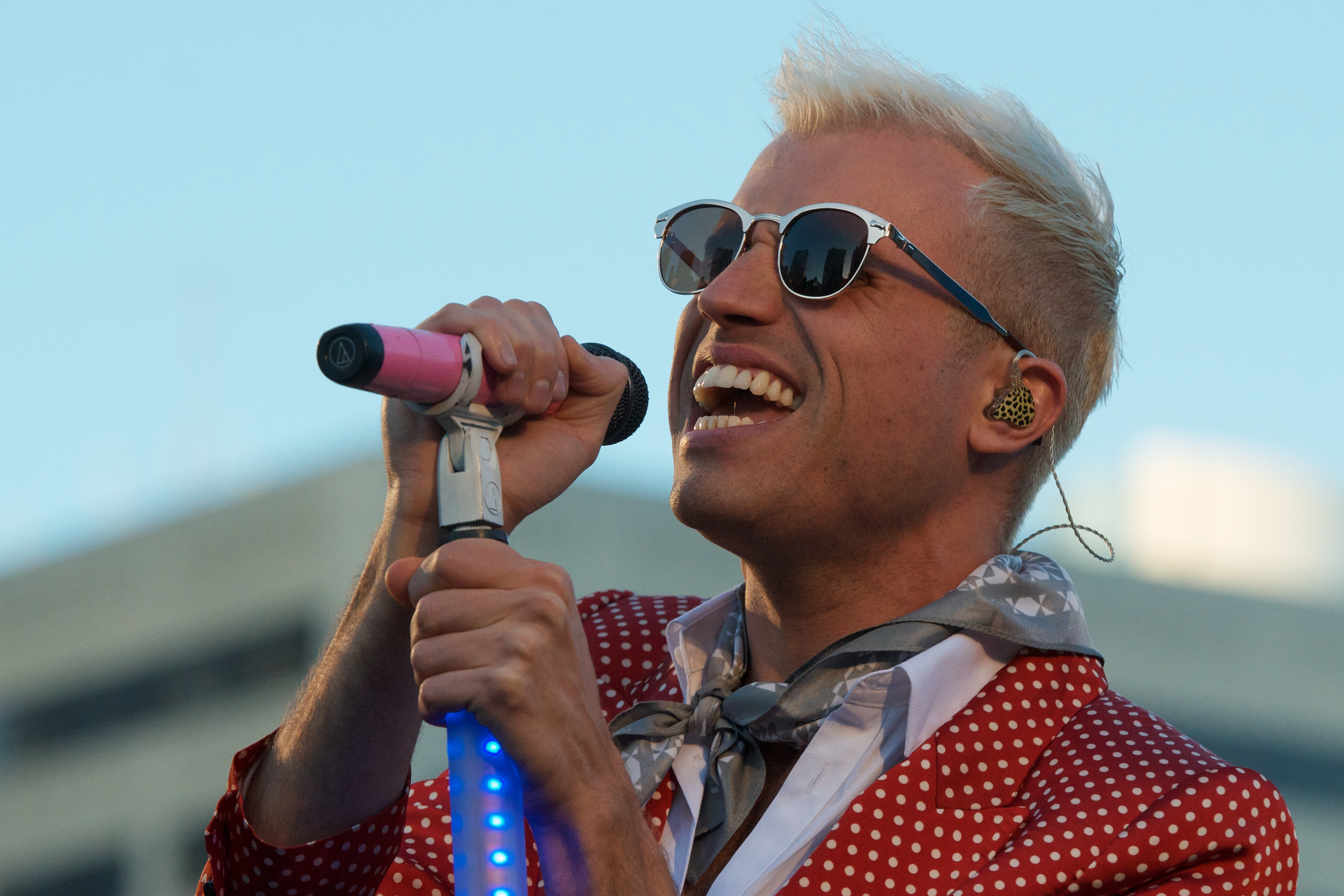
Singer Tyler Glenn came out as gay and later produced a solo album around the themes of his experiences as a gay Mormon disaffiliating from the church.

- February – A conservative Mormon blogger gained media attention for her theories that the Disney children's movie Frozen was intended to indoctrinate children by subversively promoting a "gay agenda to normalize homosexuality."
- March – A former Mormon bishop Kevin Kloosterman, who had received media attention for speaking out for LGBTQ Mormons as a current bishop, received further coverage for being denied entrance to the temple by his bishop as directed by a church seventy in part because of his support of same-sex marriage.
- March – Tyler Glenn, lead singer of Neon Trees, came out as a gay Mormon in a Rolling Stone magazine article, though, he stopped identifying as Mormon by at least April 2016.
- April – The church sent a survey via email to young single adult members in Utah asking among other things about their sexual identity. The options were: "I am heterosexual, but I struggle with same-sex attraction; I am heterosexual and do not struggle with same-sex attraction; Other, please specify." The survey options were criticized as implying that homosexuality doesn't exist and LGBTQ individuals are straight people who "struggle" with a problem. The question was later changed.
- May – The LDS church's Pioneer Day parade denied entry to the Mormon LGBTQ allies group Mormons Building Bridges, and continued to deny entry every following year into 2017.
- May – The apostle Ballard gave a CES devotional later reprinted in the September 2015 Ensign in which he quoted the church's website which stated that "individuals do not choose to have [same-sex] attractions".
- September – Another amicus brief on a same-sex marriage case was filed on by the church, this time encouraging the U.S. Supreme Court to hear Utah's Kitchen v. Herbert.
- October – BYU student Curtis Penfold who had been at the university for over two years was kicked out of his apartment, fired from his job, and expulsed from BYU after disagreeing with LDS teachings on LGBTQ rights. He stated that he, "felt so hated by this community I used to love."
- November – The apostle Eyring stated at an international colloquium on marriage in the Vatican that "We want our voice to be heard against all of the counterfeit and alternative lifestyles that try to replace the family organization". His statement was quoted in the April 2015 general conference by Apostle L. Tom Perry.

=== 2015 ===
- 2015 – A survey of 1,612 LGBTQ Mormons and former Mormons found that 73% of men and 43% of women had attempted sexual orientation change, usually through multiple methods across many years. It also found that the 51% of the respondents who had entered a mixed-orientation marriage ended up divorcing, and projected that 69% of all these marriages would ultimately end in divorce. The study also found that engaging in mixed-orientation marriages and involvement in the LDS church were correlated with higher rates of depression and a lower quality of life for LGBTQ people.
- 2015 – A version of The Eternal Family manual was released in which teachers are encouraged to ask students to treat lesbian and gay people with greater love, empathy, sensitivity, compassion and kindness and to evaluate their attitudes and actions towards homosexual individuals to see if they are Christ-like.
- 2015 – An edition of the New Testament guide for seminary students was released which interpreted a scripture in Romans as saying that lesbian and homosexual behavior is "against nature".
- January – The TLC special My Husband's Not Gay aired on the 11th featuring LDS men attracted to men but dating or married to women. Church spokesperson Eric Hawkins stated in response to media questions that the Church "does not promote marriage as a treatment method for same-sex attraction" and that religious couples in a mixed-orientation marriage should have our "support and respect".
- January – Church leaders held a "Fairness for All" news conference on the 27th supporting LGBTQ non-discrimination laws for housing and employment that would also protect religious individuals. Apostle D. Todd Christofferson opened calling for "a way forward" to balance religious freedom and LGBTQ rights. Next Neill Marriott of the presidency of Young Women's recognized the "centuries of ridicule, persecution and even violence against homosexuals". Oaks followed stating that the church rejects "persecution and retaliation of any kind, including persecution based on ... gender or sexual orientation" and called on all levels of government to pass legislation protecting "religious freedoms ... while also protecting ... LGBTQ citizens in ... housing, employment, and public accommodation." Holland closed outlining the church's stance on religious freedom. In answer to a press question afterwards Christofferson stated that "understanding is possible" and affirmed his love for his brother Tom who is gay and had been in a 20-year relationship with another man.
- March – The "Utah Compromise" was struck on the 4th between the LDS Church and LGBTQ advocates, creating a nondiscrimination law in Utah that also includes religious protections.
- March – In early March the church released a public statement and employed its lobbyists to garner support of a proposed nondiscrimination and religious rights bill in Utah. The bill would grant previously non-existent housing and employment protection for LGBTQ persons in Utah. Though similar bills had failed 6 times before, SB 296 was passed on March 11 and another statement of church approval was released. The new law, nicknamed the "Utah Compromise", was praised by many.
- March – After a disciplinary council, John Dehlin was excommunicated from the LDS church in a highly publicized case. He stated that it came in part because of his visible advocacy for same-sex marriage, and his stake president had previously stated that, "if you come out openly in support of [same-sex marriage] that is a problem." An appeal was denied by the church's highest authority.
- March – The apostle Christofferson gave an interview in which he acknowledged the diversity of sociopolitical views among church members and stated that advocating for same-sex marriage on social media or holding political beliefs differing from official church stances would not threaten a members standing in the church. He also stated that church leaders had "gained added understanding [of LGBTQ people] over the years, especially in recent years", though, he said the church would never accept same-sex marriage. In his closing answer to a question on members feeling on the outside because of their position on same-sex marriage, he stated that obedience to principles taught by the church may require "very significant sacrifice" for "all of mortal life", but "no one is predestined to a second class status" and that the result can be "a state of happiness".
- March – The church released Ministering Resources–Same-Sex Attraction for local leaders, which included the advice to "avoid offering overly simplified responses, such as the idea that ... missionary service will eliminate same-sex attraction." Former bishop Robert Rees stated in 2016 that he counseled many gay members who followed church leader promises about changing their sexual orientation via missions, temple attendance, and scripture reading, and when change didn't came they often blamed themselves for not being righteous enough and this led to many attempted and successful suicides.
- April – The church filed an amicus brief with the Sixth Circuit Court on a pending consolidated same-sex case stating that allowing same-sex marriage would "impede the ability of religious people to participate fully as equal citizens".
- May – Then & Now: How My Sexual Attractions Have Changed: 50 Brief Summaries of Successful Sexual Orientation Change Efforts was published by Latter-day Saint Rich Wyler, who previously experienced feelings of same-sex attraction.
- June – In Ferguson v. JONAH, North Star co-founder Jeff Bennion was subpoenaed to testify about his involvement with conversion therapy-adjacent organizations such as JONAH, Brothers Road, and North Star. During the trial, Bennion talked about organizing an unofficial group of North Star-affiliated men to come to his home to participate in “massages and cuddling with each other and that nudity sometimes played a part in their activities.”
- June – Three days after the US Supreme Court ruled in favor of same-sex marriage the First Presidency sent a letter to be read to every U.S. congregation affirming that "Changes in the civil ... cannot change the moral law that God has established." The letter clarified that leaders should not perform same-sex marriages and that any church property cannot be used for any activities "associated with same-sex marriages". It was noted, however, that "all visitors are welcome" on church property if church standards of conduct are respected.
- June – D. Todd Christofferson acknowledged that "we have individual members in the church with a variety of different opinions, beliefs and positions on these issues and other issues...In our view, it doesn't really become a problem unless someone is out attacking the church and its leaders," and stated that members who openly supported LGBTQ marriage would not be excommunicated.
- July – The church made a $2,500 donation to the Utah Pride Center which serves LGBTQ persons around Salt Lake City.
- July – The Miracle of Forgiveness by Spencer W. Kimball went out of print. Originally published in 1969, the book described homosexuality as a “crime against nature” and portrayed it as a curable condition.
- July – A. Dean Byrd published Mormons & Homosexuality, which discusses research and clinical data on same-sex relationships, as well as the historical relationship of the church and the United States with homosexuality. Byrd, who received a Ph.D in Psychology from BYU, was a proponent of gay conversion therapy.
- July – After the Supreme Court decision making same-sex marriage legal through the US, top church leaders sent out a letter to be read in all US congregations reaffirming the church's position on marriage and calling for civility.
- July – A church statement was released saying leaders are "deeply troubled" and re-evaluating its scouting program, as a Boy Scouts of America policy change permits openly gay scout leaders.
- August – Courtney and Rachelle who were formerly married received media attention over their divorce in order to join the LDS church.
- August – The LDS Church announced it will stay in the Boy Scouts of America program, despite concerns over permitting openly gay scout leaders.
- August – Following a Boy Scouts of America (BSA) policy change on July 27 allowing for gay scout leaders (though allowing for churches to continue banning them) the church stated that it has "always welcomed" gay youth, but that "the admission of openly gay leaders is inconsistent with the doctrines of the Church". The official press release (preceded by one on May 21 and July 13) alluded to a potential change in church relations with the BSA by stating "the century-long association with Scouting will need to be examined". Despite the majority of church members wanting to drop relations with the BSA, however, no change in relations occurred.
- September – Presidency of the Seventy member Ronald A. Rasband gave a BYU address (later reprinted in the Ensign) in which he addressed concerns about the church's involvement in politics. He shared hypothetical stories of a man fired for being gay and a woman marginalized at work for being Mormon and bemoaned that it is less politically correct to empathize with the religious woman. He invited listeners to discuss LGBTQ rights and religious freedom and to write comments on his Facebook post.
- October – Apostle Jeffrey R. Holland spoke in General Conference and told the story of Preston and Cheri Jenkins. Preston was a gay Latter-day Saint young man who experienced trauma and returned early from his mission. At the time of the address, the names were kept anonymous. The Jenkins family later published a book titled This Boy and His Mother recounting their experience.
- October – Apostle Dallin H. Oaks publicly disagreed with refusing gay marriages in violation of the recent Supreme Court ruling. Days later at the World Congress of Families, apostle Russell Ballard urges tolerance for the opposition.
- October – A church spokesperson stated that Family Services no longer offers any sexual-orientation change efforts, but are willing to help clients reconcile their attractions and religious beliefs. He also stated that their neutral stance on independent SOCE programs like Journey Into Manhood should not be taken as an endorsement.
- November – On the 5th an update letter to leaders for the Church Handbook was leaked. The policy banned a "child of a parent living in a same-gender relationship" from baby blessings, baptism, confirmation, priesthood ordination, and missionary service until the child was not living with their homosexual parent(s), was "of legal age", and "disavow[ed] the practice of same-gender cohabitation and marriage", in addition to receiving approval from the Office of the First Presidency. The policy update also added that entering a same-sex marriage as a type of "apostasy", mandating a disciplinary council. The next day, in a video interview, Todd Christofferson clarified that the policy was "about love" and "protect[ing] children" from "difficulties, challenges, conflicts" where "parents feel one way and the expectations of the Church are very different". On November 13, the First Presidency released a letter clarifying that the policy applied "only to those children whose primary residence is with a couple living in a same-gender marriage or similar relationship" and that for children residing with parents in a same-sex relationship who had already received ordinances the policy would not require that "privileges be curtailed or that further ordinances be withheld". The next day around 1,500 members gathered across from the Church Office Building to submit their resignation letters in response to the policy change with thousands more resigning online in the weeks after Two months later, in a satellite broadcast, Russell M. Nelson stated that the policy change was "revealed to President Monson" in a "sacred moment" when "the Lord inspired [him] ... to declare ... the will of the Lord".
- November – Utah married couple April Hoagland and Beckie Peirce were denied guardian rights over their foster child because of their sexual orientation by BYU graduate, former stake presidency counselor, and Mormon bishop judge Scott Johansen, leading to calls for his impeachment and resulting in his retirement.
- November – Seattle couple Celeste Carolin and Kathleen Majdali received media attention over their upcoming marriage that put them at risk of excommunication from the LDS church.
- November – An event on "overcoming" homosexuality through therapy hosted by BYU-Idaho faculty member Michael Williams was scheduled to be held the on BYU-Idaho campus and was advertised in church meetings. The event was cancelled, however, after receiving negative press. At the time BYU-I publicly hosted a video of Williams discussing ways to "treat" same-sex attraction, though, it is now accessible to students only.

=== 2016 ===
- 2016 – BYU and church policies on LGBTQ persons got the spotlight as these served as a deterrent in their football team being considered as a Fall addition to the Big 12 Conference, a consideration which was ultimately denied.
- January – Stumbling Blocks and Stepping-Stones: Including Lesbian, Gay, Bisexual, Transgender, and Intersex Children of God in the LDS Plan of Salvation was published as a 2-volume set by Duane E. Jennings. The books document the church’s relationship with its queer members.
- January – Esquire magazine published a piece on a gay church member and former members, brothers Logan and Garrett Smith and Garrett's husband Kyle Cranney.
- January – The church released a statement through spokesman Dale Jones mourning the reported suicides of 32 LGBTQ Mormons. It said leaders and members are taught to "reach out in an active, caring way to all, especially to youth who feel estranged or isolated".
- January – Judith Mehr, a commissioned painter for the church, wrote an article in the Salt Lake Tribune about showing love to gay members. She later came out as a lesbain herself.
- February – The LGBTQ Mormon and former-Mormon parent support group Mama Dragons received national media attention for its reports of LGBTQ Mormon youth suicides.
- February – The apostle Oaks was asked about church leaders and members' responsibility for the treatment of LGBTQ individuals that may have precipitated in suicides to which he stated "that's a question that will be answered on judgment day" and that "nobody is sadder about a case [of suicide] like that than I am".
- February – In a church statement on spokesperson Dale Jones spoke against passing any LGBT-related laws which could affect the "careful balance" of religious liberty and gay rights. The statement was in reference to proposed Utah hate crime bill SB107 which would add sexual orientation to the current law's list of existing groups protected by law from hate crimes in Utah. The bill failed as it had in past years and its sponsor a Mormon Republican senator criticized his church for its opposition to the bill citing the church's press release as the reason for its failure.
- February – The apostle Bednar answered a members question in a February 23 broadcast stating that "there are no homosexual members of the Church" since we are not defined by sexual attraction or behavior and "all of us have different challenges in the flesh". He compared homosexuality to a physical handicap like "being born with a body that is not fully functional".
- March – Saving Alex: When I Was Fifteen I Told My Mormon Parents I Was Gay, and That’s When My Nightmare Began was published by Alex Cooper and Joanna Brooks. The book tells Alex’s story as a gay teenager who was held captive by an unlicensed Utah-based residential treatment program after coming out to her Latter-day Saint parents.
- March – God’s Plan for Me: Keeping the Faith as a Latter-day Saint with Same-Gender Attraction was published by Ivan Neal. The book relates Neal’s internal struggles and efforts to keep his faith.
- March – Apostle Holland addressed a question on homosexuality in the church's first "face to face" broadcast event for youth on March 8. Stated at around 1 hour and 13 minutes into the broadcast, the question referred to homosexual members who felt "scared", "alone", and like they didn't "fit into the Lord's kingdom". Holland respond that the church does not "make any attempt to say why ... or how [homosexual attractions] happened" and that those with homosexual attractions have "complexities in their makeup" that we don't fully understand. He continued saying that what the church asks "for those inclined to a homosexual feeling is exactly what we ask for those with heterosexual feelings" and that the church is not making them "second-class citizens", later comparing them to women who never married.
- March – Church spokesperson Eric Hawkins stated that the church "denounces any therapy that subjects an individual to abusive practices" and hopes LGBTQ Mormons "find compassion and understanding from family members, professional counselors and church members". The statement was in response to media inquiries around the experiences of a lesbian Mormon teen who beginning in 2010 was subjected to physically abusive conversion therapy techniques in an attempt to change her sexual orientation leading to a suicide attempt.
- April – An application for a booth at the Salt Lake City pride parade by a website with gay male Mormon-themed erotic material was initially approved and then later denied by the event organizers.
- May – The Mama Dragon Story Project was published by Kimberly Anderson of the Mama Dragons nonprofit. The book includes essays and stories by Latter-day Saint mothers with LGBTQ children. A release event for the book was held in Salt Lake City in collaboration with John Dehlin and Mormon Stories.
- June – The Mexican area authority presidency had a letter read in congregations around the country urging members to oppose the national legalization of same-sex marriage and pointed them to the political organization Conciencia Nacional por la Libertad Religiosa.

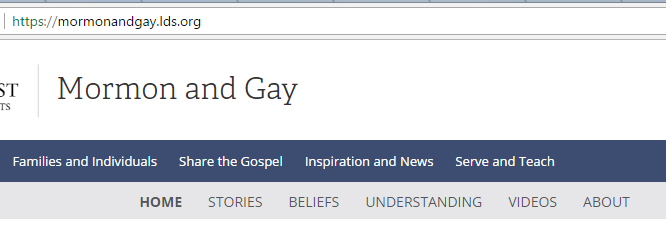
The 2016 website update contained the first church disavowal of all therapy focusing on changing sexual orientation.

- July – After a court ruling, the parent company over one of the largest LDS dating sites, LDSsingles.com, was required to allow same-sex dating as an option.
- September – The Student Government at Iowa State University passed a resolution stating their opposition to Brigham Young University joining the Big 12 Conference as a result of BYU's anti-LGBTQ policies in its Honor Code.
- October – Young Women's General President Bonnie L. Oscarson gave a conference speech in which she stated that Mormons shouldn't avoid speaking boldly against Satan's lies like same-sex marriage out of fear of offending gay people.
- October – A series of videos were released by MormonLeaks that show leaders of the church being briefed on various social and political topics. One of the videos, dated November 19, 2008, includes a conversation on the church’s involvement in politics with regards to LGBTQ people. Another shows a 2011 committee meeting of top church leaders where they discuss WikiLeaks and Chelsea Manning's diplomatic cable leaks, apostle Ballard asked if Manning was a "confirmed homosexual", apostle Oaks expressed his suspicion that the "news media cover up anything involving homosexuals when it would work to the disadvantage of the homosexual agenda".
- October – On October 25, the Mormons and Gays website was revised and moved to mormonandgay.lds.org An important addition to the website was the statement that "it is unethical to focus professional treatment on an assumption that a change in sexual orientation will or must occur." The 2016 update still offered qualified statements that reparative therapy should be an option, and promised that orientation change could occur.
- October – Tyler Glenn released his solo album, "Excommunication", about his experience with the LDS Church and his frustration with their policies.
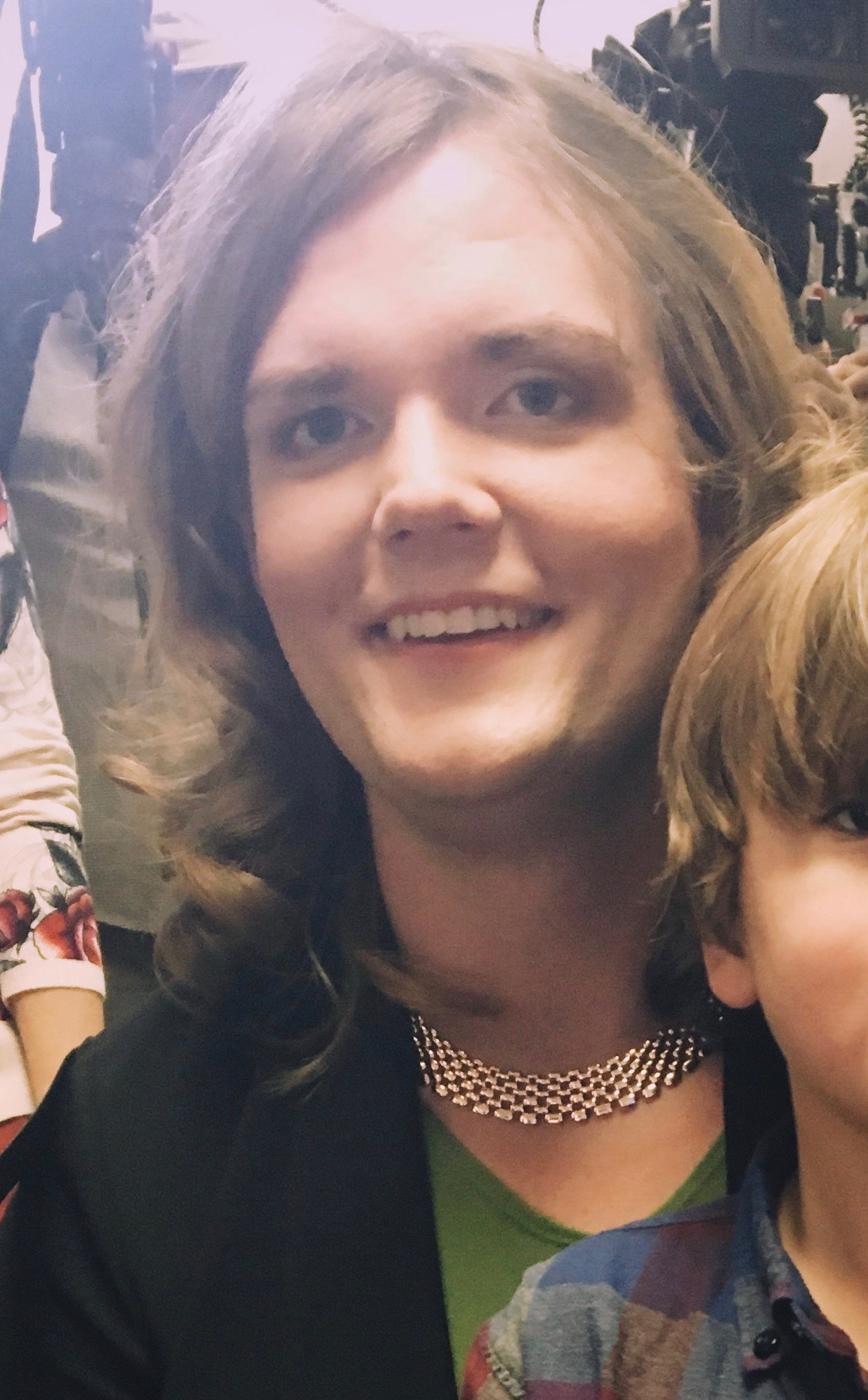
Former Mormon Misty Snow ran as the first transgender person nominated by a major party for the U.S. Senate.
- November – Salt Lake City native Misty Snow won over one-quarter of Utah votes for state senator, as the first transgender nominee for a major party to the nation's Senate. She was raised in a Mormon household.

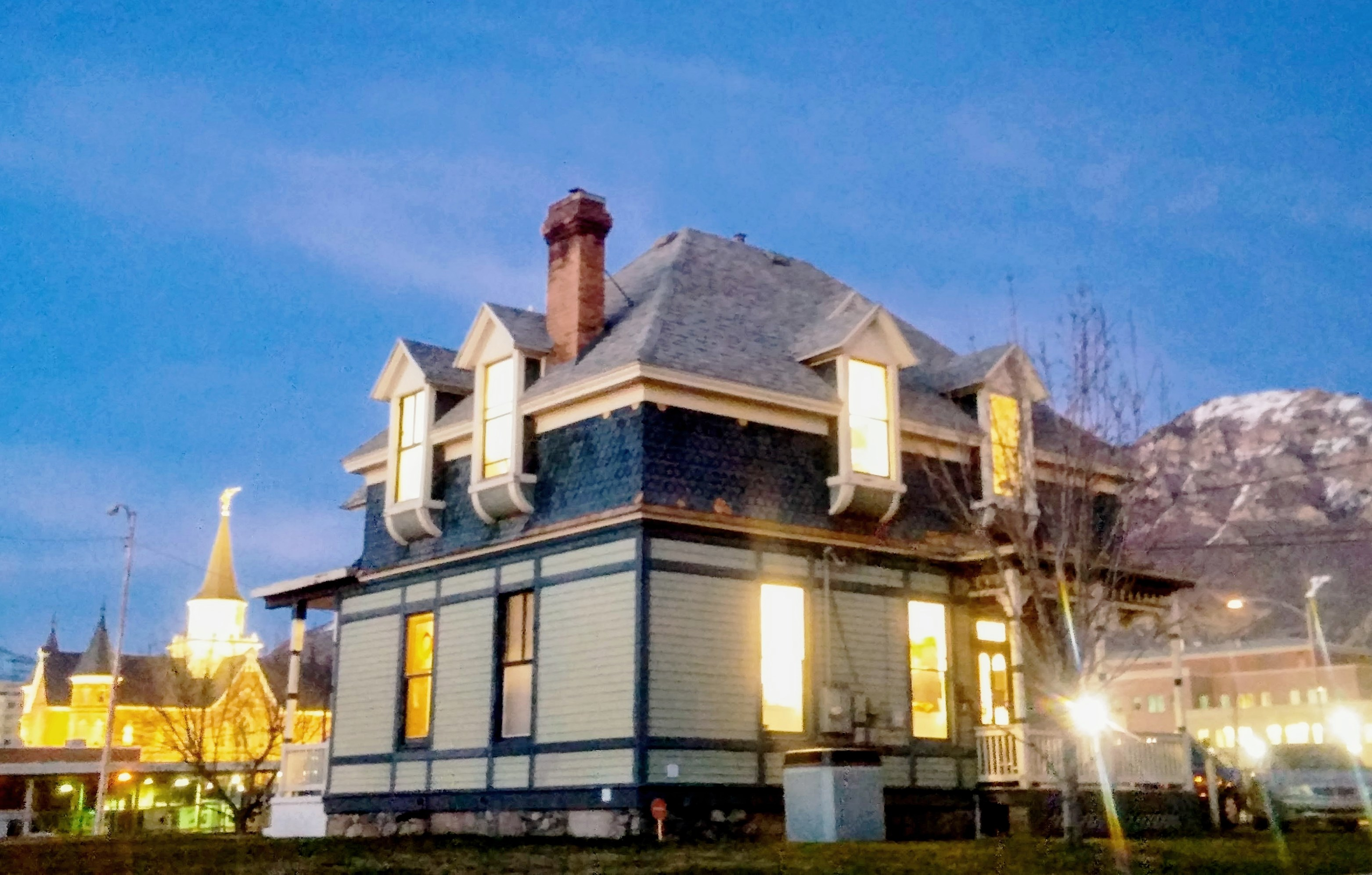
Encircle's LGBTQ center next to the Provo LDS temple

- November – The To Young Men Only pamphlet by apostle Boyd K. Packer was discontinued. This happened a year after Elder Packer died.
- December – An LGBTQ resource center "Encircle" was founded in Provo, Utah, across from a Mormon temple by a member. A church spokesperson welcomed the center saying it is good to see the property being used to serve LGBTQ people.
- December – Apostle Christofferson answered a youth's question on homosexuality at a "face to face" church broadcast in Guatemala. About 56 minutes into the broadcast he stated that "we don't know much about the causes" of why one would feel attractions to someone of the same sex, but stated that those individuals do not choose to feel those attractions and that the only sin would be in "acting" on those feelings. He encouraged the congregation of youth to respect, include, and fellowship those individuals and made clear that the church is not a place for gossip or making fun of a homosexual persons. He cited his brother Tom as a "great example" of a gay member of the church.

=== 2017 ===
- 2017 – The first 4 Options Survey was released, developed and administered by a group of researchers and academics, some of which came from a Utah and Latter-day Saint background. The survey seeks to compare life satisfaction and mental health outcomes between LGBTQ people in different relationship circumstances.
- January – The Boy Scouts of America announced in January that transgender boys can join their troops prompting a wait-and-see response from the church. The church withdrew its support of the program for older teens four months later, though it denied any link to the policy changes around LGBTQ people.
- February – The Flourish Therapy clinic was founded in Provo, Utah by Latter-day Saint Lisa Hansen. The clinic offers gender and sexuality-affirming services to LGBTQ people.
- February – The church filed an amicus brief with the US Supreme Court over the transgender bathroom case (G. G. v. Gloucester County School Board). The brief acknowledged the "heavy burdens" of gender dysphoria and stating that those who experience these "deserve compassion and respect", but opposed the interpretation of sex in Title IX as gender identity.
- March – Pass It On: A Perspective Offering Insight to All Faiths About Raising a Gay Child in a Religious Home was published by Jackie M. Smith, a Latter-day Saint mother.
- March – SB 196 was signed into law which overturned the "no promo homo" laws which had banned "advocacy of homosexuality" while allowing for negative discussions in public schools. Former Mormon Troy Williams of Equality Utah was a driving force behind the change, and he stated that they had worked together with the LDS Church and the majority Mormon legislature to change the laws. One paper stated that the LDS Church was largely behind the reasoning for the laws and anti-gay culture of Utah. Similar laws were still enforced in seven conservative states mostly in the Southern US as of 2017.
- March – The church published a video and blog post highlighting the Mackintosh's acceptance of their gay post-Mormon son and LGBTQ people. The video was added to mormonandgay.lds.org.
- April – An Ensign article by Seventy Larry Lawrence stated that "same-sex marriage is only a counterfeit" and quoted a canonized LDS scripture where Jesus warns that a counterfeit "is not of God, and is darkness".
- April – The apostle Jeffrey R. Holland stated in general conference that God created diversity and the loss of those on the margins of the church is felt by all and that, "There is room [in the church] for those with differing sexual attractions."
- May – Allison Dayton, a Latter-day mother, founded the Lift + Love Foundation and created its Instagram page. Lift + Love started as an online community and collection of resources for LGBTQ Latter-day Saints. They later started a podcast to help families with LGBTQ members, as well as a monthly LGBTQ-themed curriculum to follow the church's Come, Follow Me program.
- May – Twelve-year-old Savannah came out to her Utah ward as lesbian during a fast and testimony meeting. During her speech a Stake Presidency member had the mic cut off and told her to sit down. A video of the event gained media attention.
- May – The production of the documentary Faithful: A Lesbian Mormon Story telling the story of two lesbian Mormons, Lauralie and Marylu, received media attention.
- June – An anonymous essay by a Mormon mother of a lesbian daughter was published on the church's website in which she stated that, "the decision we made to even allow a [child's same-sex] partner to stay in the home might not be appropriate for other families. The presence of younger children or other factors may make what works for us unfeasible for someone else."
- June – Former stake president and church temple architect Laurie Lee Hall was excommunicated by her Utah local leaders for socially transitioning to express her gender identity as a transgender woman. She had experienced years of suicidal ideation and gender dysphoria before being released as a stake president in 2012. She reported being released because of expressing her identity and later decided to come out to her entire congregation in July 2016. Hall is one of the first former stake presidents in the church to come out as LGBTQ.
- June – Ruthie Robertson, an adjunct political science professor at BYU-Idaho, was fired from the university for making a pro-LGBTQ post on Facebook. One week after making the post, Robertson was asked to remove the post in exchange for keeping her job, to which she refused.
- July – A Fourth of July parade in the over 75% LDS town of Provo, Utah, reportedly gave permission then denied entry the day before the parade to the new Provo LGBTQ Mormon resource center Encircle garnering national attention.
- July – An instructor at the church's BYU-Idaho reported being fired after refusing to take down a post on her private Facebook page in support of LGBTQ rights. Her story gained national media attention.
- August – Minutes from a February 2014 Layton, Utah meeting for stake leaders were released without authorization in which the apostle L. Tom Perry stated that gay young men need association with "manly things" and strong, vigorous men who know the power they hold. He also stated that he does not believe that people are born with attractions to those of the same sex, but that it is instead a temptation like any other. He further stated that supporting same-sex marriage would "incriminate" members seeking to renew their temple recommend and that same-sex couples expressing any physical affection during church meetings should be allowed to attend but reprimanded by leaders in private. The importance of opposite-sex marriage was stressed with the statement that Jesus and the prophets believed in it and that allowing evil like this to grow would destroy the basic family unit and bring calamities.
- August – The OUT Foundation was created by several BYU alumni as a platform and resource for LGBTQ BYU students.
- August – The apostle Oaks told Kansas youth to not use sexual orientation labels on themselves, and that he has letters from people who stopped having gay feelings and married and had children.

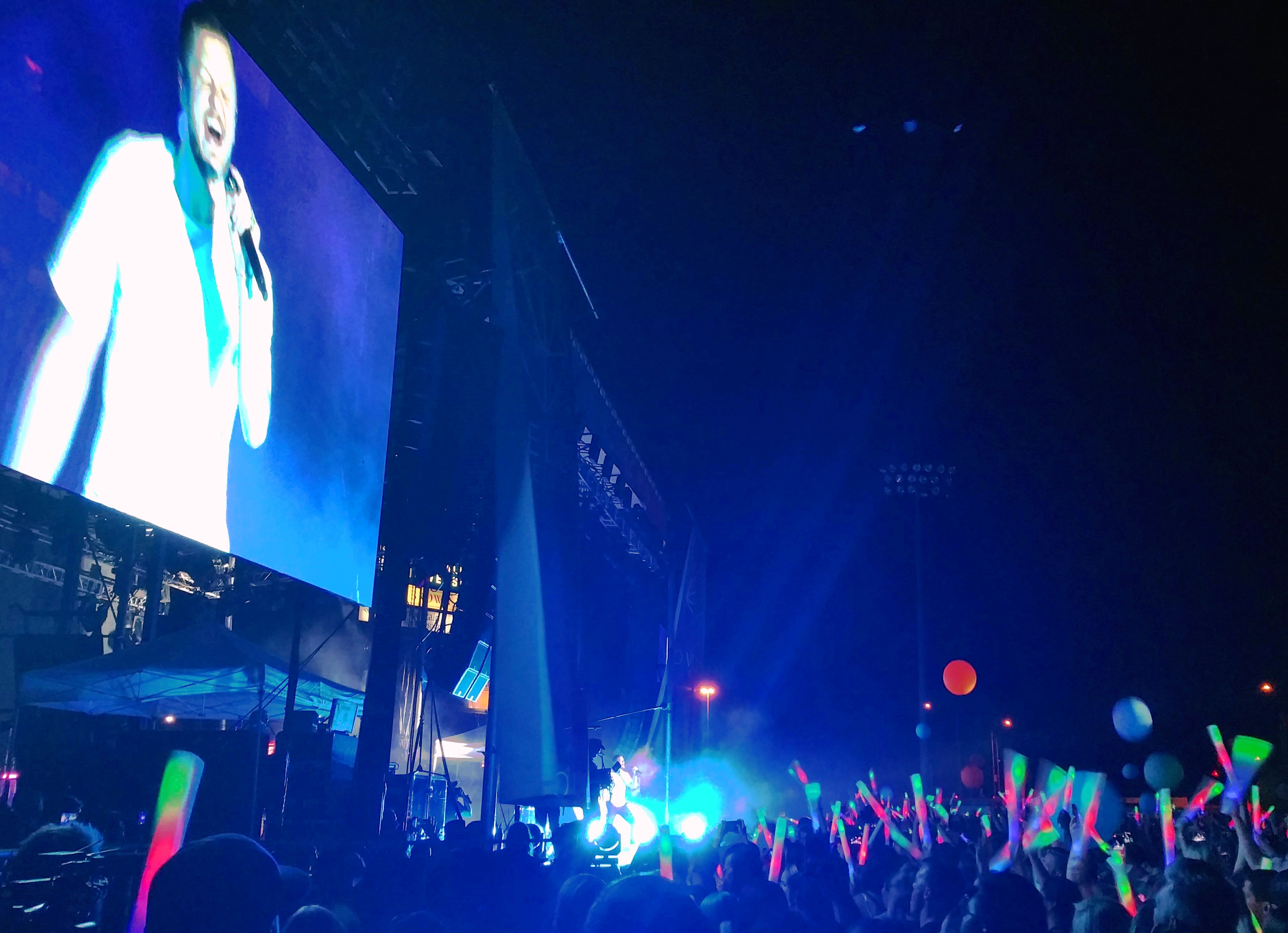
Dan Reynolds of Imagine Dragons performing at the 2017 Utah LoveLoud Fest dedicated to LGBTQ+ youth

- August – The church's newsroom released a statement on the 16th in support of the upcoming Utah County benefit concert, LoveLoud Fest, for LGBTQ youth held by popular bands Imagine Dragons, and Neon Trees. Former BYU student and Imagine Dragons lead singer Dan Reynolds as well as gay former Mormon and Neon Trees lead singer Tyler Glenn had both publicly criticized the church for its policies and treatment of LGBTQ people. The bands performed for a sold-out crowd of 17,000.
- September – Autoboyography was published by Christina Lauren, a coauthor novelist duo from Utah. The book tells the fictional story of a bisexual high school student in Provo, Utah who falls in love with his classmate.
- September – The Pacific area presidency sent a letter to be read in all Australian congregations which reemphasized the church's position against same-sex marriage and parenting and urged members to vote in the upcoming national referendum on the issue.
- September – The LDS Church signs an amicus brief supporting wedding cake bakers discriminating against same-sex couples in a Colorado court case.

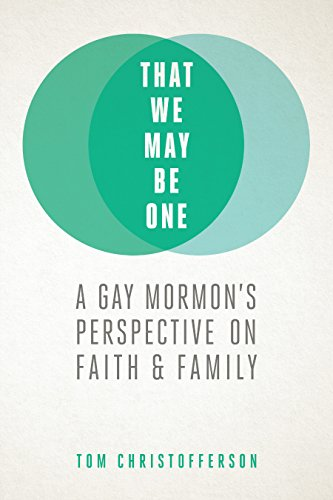
A church-published book on the experiences of Tom Christofferson as a gay Mormon.

- September – Tom Christofferson, the 60-year-old gay brother of church apostle D. Todd Christofferson, published his book on his 19-year relationship with another man and later return to involvement with the LDS Church. The book was published by the LDS church's Deseret Book publishers. He later participated in a panel discussion at the University of Utah.
- September – The apostle Oaks stated that the Family Proclamation's teachings on same-sex marriage were not changeable policies but statements of eternal truth, the will of God, and the basis for church teachings and practice over the last two decades. He lamented the increase in public acceptance of same-sex marriage and acknowledged the conflicts with friends and family that opposing this acceptance could cause. He further stated that despite the conflict church members should choose God and the LDS church's plan and way.
- October – Apostle Dallin H. Oaks speaks in General Conference about "The Plan and the Proclamation". He states that "Converted Latter-day Saints believe that the family proclamation, issued nearly a quarter century ago and now translated into scores of languages, is the Lord's reemphasis of the gospel truths we need to sustain us through current challenges to the family. Two examples are same-sex marriage and cohabitation without marriage. Just 20 years after the family proclamation, the United States Supreme Court authorized same-sex marriage, overturning thousands of years of marriage being limited to a man and a woman."
- October – Journalist Benjamin Adams wrote a HuffPost article about receiving unsuccessful gay conversion therapy from bishop Jeff Robinson, who received a Ph.D. in Marriage and Family Therapy from BYU and runs a private practice in Provo, Utah. Robinson’s dissertation in 1998 was on successful efforts to change the sexual orientation of gay married men. After the article, Robinson spoke at the 2018 FAIR conference and demonstrated a shift in ideas, where instead of stating that same-sex attraction can be reduced, he said that opposite-sex attraction can be learned.
- October – Jacinda Ardern became prime minister of New Zealand. Ardern grew up as a Latter-day Saint, but left due to the church’s stance against LGBTQ rights. In 2019 following the mosque shootings in Christchurch, New Zealand, the prophet Russell M. Nelson visited Ardern and offered donations to the mosques affected by the shootings. He also gave Ardern a Book of Mormon with her name on it and photos of the First Presidency and 12 apostles.
- November – In response to a question about LGBTQ young single adults in the church, apostle Ballard tells BYU students in a campus-wide event that, "I believe you have a place in the kingdom and recognize that sometimes it may be difficult for you to see where you fit in the Lord's Church, but you do." He also told cisgender, heterosexual members, "We need to listen to and understand what our LGBT brothers and sisters are feeling and experiencing. Certainly, we must do better than we have done in the past so that all members feel they have a spiritual home." He further explained that church leaders believe "core rights of citizenship should be protected for all people — for LGBT people, for people of all faiths," and that "reasonable compromises" should be found "in other areas when rights conflict." He stated that church leaders supported the recent LoveLoud Festival to send a message that "LGBT youth or anyone else should never be mistreated".
- November – Apostles Oaks and Ballard gave a broadcast in which they answered some pre-submitted questions, including those about homosexual members. Oaks stated that members should avoid labeling themselves, and "the commandment to love one another and help bear one another's burdens—that comes first." Ballard stated that members need to be willing to talk about the subject and to listen.
- December – The 1981 church guide on homosexuality that taught that masturbation made people gay received media attention.
- December – Gay Mormon Dad was published by Chad Anderson, a gay Latter-day Saint. The book recounts Anderson’s story of living and being married as a Latter-day Saint, and later coming out. A graphic novel with the same name was published by Anderson in 2026.

=== 2018 ===
- 2018 – J. Kirk Richards, a Latter-day Saint artist, completed an oil painting titled Jesus Said Love Everyone. The piece, part of a larger collection by Richards on diversity and inclusion, shows Jesus wearing a rainbow-colored gown. Other pieces by Richards include paintings of chapels and angels with rainbow colors.
- January – An obituary for the recently deceased church president Thomas S. Monson mentioned church actions on LGBTQ topics during his presidency that had garnered national attention. Many Mormons felt the obituary focused too much on controversies during Monson's presidency such as those around LGBTQ topics.
- January – Top leaders Nelson and Oaks answered a press question on LGBTQ people.
- January – A documentary on the AIDS crisis in Utah, Quiet Heroes, debuted at Utah's Sundance Film Festival. The film touched upon the effects the teachings and norms of the Mormon community played in the crisis including the effects that the state's religious monoculture had on furthering the marital spread of AIDS through closeted gay Mormon men who were pressured to marry women, but cheated on their spouse.
- January – The documentary "Believer" featuring Imagine Dragon's Mormon lead singer Dan Reynolds premiered at the Sundance Film Festival. The documentary discusses Dan's experiences with the intersection of LGBTQ youth and the Mormon community and its norms, as well as LGBTQ Mormon suicides.
- January – The LDS Church began running Facebook and YouTube advertisements on LGBTQ topics.
- January – The John Williams Encircle home is opened in Salt Lake City, Utah.
- January – The divorce of a Mormon gay man Josh Weed from his wife Lolly after a 15-year-long marriage brought media attention to Mormon mixed-orientation marriages.
- February – The church-run Family Services stated in the church's newspaper that it no longer provides reparative therapy or sexual orientation change efforts.
- February – Bishop Paul Augenstein and his wife Susie organized a 5th Sunday meeting about the needs of LGBTQ Latter-day Saints in their Riverton, Utah ward. They included LGBTQ speakers as well as allies.
- February – Former bishop Richard Ostler started a podcast called Listen, Learn, and Love. The podcast highlights experiences and stories of LGBTQ and other members of the church.
- March – BYU Student Life hosted the first church-university-hosted LGBTQ campus event. It featured a panel of four students answering student-submitted questions.
- April – Project Rainbow Utah was founded as a nonprofit organization that sets up LGBTQ pride flags at host businesses and homes on scheduled days.
- April – After a controversy over BYU's policies around LGBTQ people, a conference for the US Society for Political Methodology was moved off of campus citing a "long-strained relations between the LGBTQ community and BYU" and concerns over the university's ban on homosexual behavior which the Society repudiated along with "the intolerance it represents."
- April – Closeted: My Life as a Gay BYU Student: A Memoir was published by Jonathan Alder. In the book, Alder shares his experience at BYU of trying to reconcile being gay with following church teachings.
- May – The LDS Church announced that its charter with the Boy Scouts of America will end in 2019. The separation between the two groups comes as the Boy Scouts had evolved since 2010 on several topics, including allowing gay and transgender people into membership and leadership, which was opposed by the LDS Church.
- May – Laura Root shared her story as one of the first former ward Relief Society presidents to openly talk about being in a same-sex marriage. Another was Shaunie Schow, who shared her story in 2020.
- June – The LDS Church released a statement in favor of the US Supreme Court ruling on the Masterpiece Cakeshop v. Colorado Civil Rights Commission case over a business owner who refused to serve a gay couple.
- June – The Westboro Baptist Church protested the LDS Church in Rexburg, stating in a press release that due in part to their teachings on polygamy, Mormons would go to hell along with gay and transgender people. In February 2008 they had also protested in Salt Lake City at the funeral of church president Gordon B. Hinckley, and criticized Hinckley as being too accepting and ambiguous in speaking about gay people.
- June – Celebrity talk show host Ellen DeGeneres spoke about LGBTQ Mormon youth and suicides during an interview with Dan Reynolds about his Believer documentary. Reynolds also discussed LGBTQ Mormons on The Daily Show with Trevor Noah.

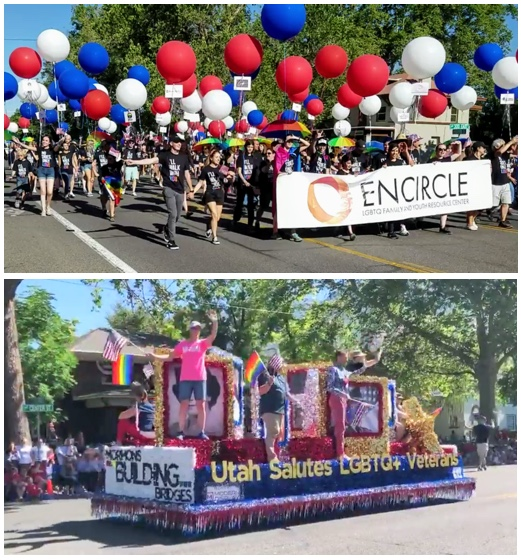
After much controversy LGBTQ marchers including some from the LGBT-Mormon organizations Encircle and Mormons Building Bridges were allowed to openly march in Provo's 4th of July parade for the first time.

- June – Hours after agreeing to a non-discrimination clause in order to receive local tax funds the Provo Freedom Festival board denied LGBTQ groups a spot in the parade for the second year in a row sparking public outcry and criticism from Provo's mayor and Utah County Commissioner. One of these groups included a float of local Mormon LGBTQ veterans representing Mormons Building Bridges. After negotiations, the festival leaders decided to allow the groups to march. However, the day before the parade one LGBTQ group was almost forced out of the grand parade, and the groups were told they could not have rainbow flags.
- June – The Mormon Tabernacle Choir and San Francisco Gay Men's Chorus performed a rehearsal song together in San Francisco.
- July – Church leaders' continued denial of BYU LGBTQ students' years of requests to form a club on campus received national coverage.
- August – BYU professor Eric Huntsman gave a BYU campus-wide devotional mentioning gay Mormons Tom Christofferson, and a Mormon Tabernacle Choir singer Alex. Huntsman said Alex felt frequent pain, struggle and loneliness trying to stay in the LDS church. He further stated that, "For not just our LGBTQ+ sisters and brothers but for many people, the choice to love can literally make the difference between life and death."
- August – The gay, LDS-raised Salt Lake County Republican Party's communication director Dave Robinson stated that while many people attribute the high LGBTQ suicide rate in Utah to the culture of The Church of Jesus Christ of Latter-day Saints he believed it had more to do with self-loathing caused by having too much sex with too many different partners, and that HIV-preventive drugs cause gay men to have sex like "bunny rabbits."
- August – The documentary Church and State—which highlights the events surrounding the battle for same-sex marriage in Utah—debuts at the Broadway Theatre in Utah.
- August – The church-published magazine LDS Living produced an article in which a gay Mormon man said that his mission president's loving response to him coming out "saved [his] life" and "prepared the way ... to handle the incredibly, overwhelmingly negative reactions [he] would get from every other priesthood leader and family member he came out to after."
- August – Kris A. Irvin, a transgender male and BYU student, was interviewed by the Salt Lake Tribune. They are considering top surgery to help with their gender dysphoria, but face expulsion from BYU and excommunication from the church.
- October – Apostle Oaks speaks in General Conference about "Truth and the Plan". He states "...some are troubled by some of our Church's positions on marriage and children. Our knowledge of God's revealed plan of salvation requires us to oppose current social and legal pressures to retreat from traditional marriage and to make changes that confuse or alter gender or homogenize the differences between men and women. We know that the relationships, identities, and functions of men and women are essential to accomplish God's great plan."
- November – The Latter-day Lesbian podcast was launched by Shelly Johnson (a former Latter-day Saint) and Mary Rutt (a former evangelical Christian). The podcast discusses their experience as lesbians and as former members of their respective churches.
- December – Studio C cast member Stacey Harkey came out as gay. His advocacy for LGBTQ people since then has included hosting the Encircle podcast, performing the same-sex marriage of Adam Berg (another original Studio C cast member), and co-hosting a gay comedy channel with Adam called Confessions of Mormon Boys.

=== 2019 ===
- 2019 – The church updated the Ministering Resources—Same-Sex Attraction page for leaders stating, "Avoid promising a reduction or elimination of same-sex attraction in exchange for faithfulness or missionary service."
- January – The wording of the temple’s Law of Chastity covenant was changed to say “legally and lawfully wedded according to [God’s] law”, instead of the previous “legally and lawfully wedded”. While the older version seemed to include any marriage under civil law, the newer version is more explicit in only including marriages sanctioned by church doctrine, therefore excluding same-sex marriages.
- January – David Matheson, a top proponent of "conversion therapy", announces that he is gay and is getting divorced to live his life as a gay man.
- February - An interview between Sterling Van Wagenen and Sean Escobar was released through the Truth & Transparency Foundation. Sterling, a co-founder of the Sundance Film Festival and director of multiple LDS temple videos, admitted to sexually molesting Sean when he was 13 in 1993 and that he considered himself bisexual.
- February – Former BYU mascot Charlie Bird came out as gay.
- February – Jana Riess published The Next Mormons: How Millennials Are Changing the LDS Church, a sociological analysis based on survey data showing generational differences among Latter-day Saints, including perspectives on LGBTQ topics.
- March – Travis Steward shared his experience at the North Star conference as one of the first openly gay former mission presidents.
- April – November 2015 policy changes announced. Children of parents who identify themselves as lesbian, gay, bisexual, or transgender may now be blessed as infants and baptized in the LDS Church without First Presidency approval. In addition, the church will no longer characterize same-gender marriage by a church member as "apostasy" for purposes of church discipline, although it is still considered "a serious transgression".
- April – Apostle Neil L. Andersen delivered a General Conference address emphasizing principles in The Family Proclamation. In his talk, he referenced a friend who "is not married because of same-sex attraction. He has remained true to his temple covenants, has expanded his creative and professional talents, and has served nobly in both the Church and the community."
- April – Gregory Prince published Gay Rights and the Mormon Church, a book documenting the LDS Church’s relationship with marriage equality and gay rights.
- April – BYU valedictorian Matt Easton spoke at a BYU commencement ceremony. He states "I stand before my family, friends and graduating class today to say that I am proud to be a gay son of God."
- April – The Beyond the Block podcast was launched by James Jones (a Black Latter-day Saint) and Derek Knox (a queer Latter-day Saint convert). The podcast discusses culture and theology within the church.
- April – Mama’s Boy was published by Dustin Lance Black, a Latter-day Saint screenwriter. The autobiography tells his story of coming out as gay, producing films, and being an activist for LGBTQ rights. In 2022, a film by the same name was produced and released by Black.
- June – Utah County Commissioner David Ivie publicly came out as gay. After losing his seat the next year in the Republican primaries, he claimed that his coming out contributed to his loss.
- June – The Husband in Law podcast was started by Latter-day Saints Jessica and Matt Frew, and Jessica’s gay ex-husband Steve Stoddard. The podcast discusses topics like marriage, divorce, and family relationships.
- June – President Russell M. Nelson met with Pulse nightclub owner Barbara Poma to offer condolences in the shooting three years prior.
- June – President Dallin H. Oaks spoke at a devotional at BYU Hawaii. He said "Along with these challenges—and caused by them—we are confronted by a culture of evil and personal wickedness in the world. This includes.....the increasing frequency and power of the culture and phenomenon of lesbian, gay, and transgender lifestyles and values."
- June – The Human Stories podcast was launched with Jill Hazard Rowe as host. The podcast features many stories of LGBTQ people in Utah and the church.
- June – In a church education broadcast, Jeffrey R. Holland spoke of Generation Z, saying “They tend to ‘[support] gay marriage and transgender rights … [as] part of everyday life. It would be rare for a Z to not have a [close] friend from the LGBT community.’ Because of this sociability, the thin line between friendship and condoning behavior begins to blur and is difficult to draw.”
- June – A play titled The Mama Dragons Monologues: Mormon Mothers of LGBTQ Kids Speak Out, written by Sue Bergin and Scott Winfield Sublett, had its first public reading in San Jose, California. The play presents the thoughts and stories of Latter-day Saint mothers with LGBTQ children.
- June – A neighborhood in Sandy, Utah displayed Pride flags for Pride Week. This was part of the Project Rainbow Utah initiative started by Kristy and Willy Donahoo. Several months after their 2020 initiative, an anonymous member of their LDS congregation sent a letter to each home that had flown a pride flag, calling into question their temple worthiness. This was closely correlated with several other anti-LGBTQ letters sent in Utah neighborhoods in response to LGBTQ pride flags.
- June – BYU track athlete Emma Gee comes out as bisexual.
- August – Beacon SSA Ministry was founded as a support group for gay Latter-day Saints in Rexburg, Idaho by Tember Harward, a gay man who converted to the church. The group aims to keep members faithful to teachings of the Family Proclamation, while also disavowing things like conversion therapy. The group includes a blog and podcast episodes.
- August – Edward Smart, father of Elizabeth Smart, came out as gay and stated that he no longer found solace in the LDS Church and that he had watched for years as, "LGBTQ individuals both in and out of the Church have been victims of ridicule, shunning, rejection and outright humiliation."
- August – Dennis Schleicher published Is He Nuts?: Why a Gay Man Would Become a Member of the Church of Jesus Christ, in which he shares his experiences as a gay man and his decision to join the church.
- September – Becky Mackintosh published Love Boldly, a book recounting her experience as a Mormon mother whose son came out as gay, and how their family grew to love and accept him. The book has been sold at Deseret Book.
- September – President Russell M. Nelson spoke at a BYU devotional, "The Love and Laws of God". He stated, "...let's consider the definition of marriage. In recent years, many countries, including the United States, have legalized same-sex marriage. As members of the Church, we respect the laws of the land and abide by them, including civil marriage. The truth is, however, that in the beginning—in the beginning—marriage was ordained by God! And to this day it is defined by Him as being between a man and a woman. God has not changed His definition of marriage."
- September – After a school district in Tucson, Arizona proposed a new sex education program, a locally circulated video caused protests in opposition to the proposal. The video claimed that comprehensive sex education was part of a conspiracy to sexualize children for profit. It was created and circulated by Family Watch International, a nonprofit founded in Gilbert, Arizona by a Latter-day Saint named Sharon Slater.
- October – Apostle Oaks spoke of three fundamental doctrinal truths that God has revealed: "First, ... that God created 'male and female,'" and that this "binary creation is essential to the plan of salvation." "Second, modern revelation teaches that eternal life, the greatest gift of God to His children, is only possible through the creative powers inherent in the combination of male and female joined in an eternal marriage (see Doctrine and Covenants 132:19). That is why the law of chastity is so important." "Finally, the long-standing doctrinal statements reaffirmed in [The Family: A Proclamation to the World] 23 years ago will not change. They may be clarified as directed by inspiration." For example, "the intended meaning of gender in the family proclamation and as used in Church statements and publications since that time is biological sex at birth."
- October – The United States Supreme Court hears three cases of LGBTQ people who claimed they were fired because of their identities.
- October – Apostle Oaks spoke in the Women's Session of General Conference on the "Two Great Commandments". He stated "Our zeal to keep [the second great commandment] must not cause us to forget the first, to love God with all our heart, soul and mind. We show that love by keeping His commandments." "The leaders of the Church must always teach the unique importance of marriage between a man and a woman and the related law of chastity." "Our walk must be considerate of children who are uncertain about their sexual orientation, but it discourages premature labeling because in most children such uncertainty decreases significantly over time." "...among those the women of this Church may save will be their own dear friends and family who are currently influenced by worldly priorities and devilish distortions."
- November – In the BYU Political Review, a magazine published by students, an article was included titled “Is the LGBT+ Moment Over?” The article discusses how more needs to be done nationally and internationally before LGBTQ people have equal rights. It also discusses LGBTQ suicide rates. After copies of the edition were distributed on campus, a group of anonymous students stapled copies of the Family Proclamation inside the magazines that said “BYU Political Review regularly publishes messages contrary to church doctrine.”
- November – A year after Gerrit W. Gong was called as an apostle, his son Matthew Gong published a letter on the Latter Gay Stories website coming out as queer.
- November – The church's 2016 tacit endorsement of conversion therapy was announced as overturned when a spokesperson for the church stated, "We are opposed to conversion therapy and our therapists do not practice it."
- December – The church publicly supported the U.S. federal Fairness For All Act, largely modeled after legislation passed in Utah in 2015, codifying more LGBTQ nondiscrimination and religious liberty. The federal bill failed to pass in 2019, and again in 2021 after being reintroduced with the church's support.
- December – The Church Newsroom announced that same-sex marriages could now be recorded on the church’s FamilySearch platform. The article also reiterated that same-sex couples still couldn’t be married in the temple.

== See also ==
- Homosexuality and the LDS Church
- Law of adoption (Mormonism)
- LGBTQ rights in Utah
- LGBTQ Mormon suicides
- List of Christian denominational positions on homosexuality
- Mormonism in the 21st century
- Sexuality and Mormonism
