= David Matheson =

David Matheson may refer to:

- David Matheson, member of Moxy Früvous
- David Matheson (campaigner), known for advocacy of conversion therapy
