= Gaylord K. Swim =

American businessman

- Born: Carmel, California
- Died: February 5, 2005 (aged 56)
- Occupations: Businessman, philanthropist
- Known for: Founder of the Sutherland Institute

Gaylord K. Swim (December 17, 1948 – February 5, 2005) was an American businessman. He was the founder of the Sutherland Institute and a prominent community leader.

== Biography ==
=== Early life ===
Swim was a native of Carmel, California. He attended Pomona College and then transferred to Brigham Young University (BYU). He joined the Church of Jesus Christ of Latter-day Saints (LDS Church) while a student at BYU. In 1970 he graduated with a BS in business. He then served a mission for the church in the Germany Central Mission (later called the Germany Düsseldorf Mission). After his return from his mission he earned an M.A. in political science from BYU.

=== Career ===
Early on Swim worked for Dominick & Dominick. He and his mother Kay Swim were involved with the publication of Stephen R. Covey's best-selling book The 7 Habits of Highly Effective People. Covey noted his thanks for their contribution in the Acknowledgements section of the book. In the late 80's, Swim established a wealth management company Pillar Capital Advisors. He also was a co-founder of the Rural Health Management Corporation which operates the Central Valley Medical Center in Nephi, Utah. He was active in the community, and served as the chairman of a committee which studied a proposed division of Alpine School District in northern Utah County. Swim and the majority of the committee ultimately recommended against dividing the school district, citing concerns about the impact on school budgets and property tax rates.

=== Philanthropy ===
Swim was active in philanthropic efforts. He was a long-time member of the Philanthropy Roundtable. He also served on the boards of several other non-profit organizations, including the State Policy Network, American Heritage School (Utah), Deseret International Foundation, Enterprise Mentors International, and the Council for National Policy.

=== Personal life ===
In 1973, he married Lauralyn Bankhead in the Salt Lake Temple. They had five children. In the LDS Church, he served in various positions including as a bishop and a counselor in a stake presidency. He died of brain cancer at the age of 56.
