= Brothers on a Road Less Traveled =

American nonprofit organization for men seeking to reduce unwanted same-sex attraction

Brothers Road
- Brothers on a Road Less Traveled
- Named after: "The Road Not Taken"
- Founded: 2000; 26 years ago
- Founders: Rich Wyler, Dave Matheson
- Type: Educational Organization
- Tax ID no.: 54-2056275
- Purpose: Support men wanting to attempt to decrease unwanted homosexual attractions, and increase heterosexual attractions
- Headquarters: Ruckersville, Virginia, USA
- Region served: Worldwide
- Subsidiaries: Journey Into Manhood
- Website: brothersroad.org (formerly PeopleCanChange.com)
- Formerly called: People Can Change (until 2016)

Brothers on a Road Less Traveled is an American nonprofit organization supporting men who wish to reduce or eliminate their homosexual desires. Formerly known as People Can Change (PCC), the organization was founded in 2000, and is sometimes called Brothers Road (BR). It runs the Journey Into Manhood program. The organization and program are controversial and have been alleged to be consumer fraud in a 2016 complaint made to the Federal Trade Commission. For decades, Brothers Road co-founder David Matheson was one of the nation's leading conversion therapists, but in 2019 he left the organization to date men.

== Formation and purpose ==
People Can Change was founded in 2000 by two Mormon men, Rich Wyler and David Matheson, based upon principles of reparative (conversion) therapy. Both men had ties to the now-defunct, ex-gay LDS organization Evergreen International. In 2016, PCC changed its name to Brothers on a Road Less Traveled.

In a 2007 interview, Wyler explained that the organization's purpose is to help men find peace and fulfillment in their lives; while Wyler states that some men may find peace and fulfillment in a gay identity, he contends that other men with homosexual attractions have found fulfillment in celibacy or in heterosexual relationships. Many mental health organizations have criticized conversion therapy. Though BR seeks to diminish same-sex attractions, it "does not identify as an organisation for gay conversion therapy." However, Mathew Shurka--the co-founder of Born Perfect--has asserted that Brothers Road and other groups like it are "repackaging" conversion therapy. The Brothers Road website states that BR "especially support[s] ... Men who want to explore affirming ways to lessen the distress, intensity, or frequency of any same-sex attractions" and "align their sexual and romantic thoughts, feelings, and behaviors with their own core values".

== Programs ==
The Journey Into Manhood (JiM) weekend is an ex-gay program offered by BR. The JiM weekend was founded in 2002 by Rich Wyler and counselor David Matheson. The JiM weekend lasts for 48 hours and includes psychodrama, visualizations, role-playing, and team-building exercises. Journeyers "are taught that their same-sex attractions are rooted in childhood traumas that pulled them away from male figures" and that to experience sexual orientation change, they "need to fulfill their needs for male attention through non-sexual platonic bonding." "The founders do not promise [attendees] they will transition from being gay to straight [overnight], but the overall goal is to give the men a foundation so they can work on making the change over time." In 2017, Wyler stated that Journey into Manhood weekend participants must be 21 years of age and must attend the program voluntarily; previously attendees were as young as 18.

JiM weekends also include an activity that PCC has described as "safe healing touch" or "'father-son-style holding'". Dr. Jack Drescher of the American Psychiatric Association has stated that "there is no scientific evidence that 'healthy touch' exercises can help diminish same-sex attractions." Wyler has defended the practice as "touch[ing] a core unmet need from childhood."

Witnesses testified about Brothers Road programs in Ferguson v. JONAH, a lawsuit in which a New Jersey jury found that conversion therapy constituted consumer fraud.

Some attendees of Brothers Road programs have later spoken out against the organization but others have spoken favorably about their experience.

== 2016 Federal Trade Commission complaint ==
In February 2016, Brothers Road (then PCC) was "reported to the Federal Trade Commission (FTC) and accused of breaking the prohibition on unfair and deceptive acts" by engaging in sexual orientation change efforts. The complaint alleged that PCC "defraud[ed] consumers into believing that being gay is tantamount to a mental illness or defect", and added that various mental health organizations had debunked that belief. The complaint was filed on behalf of "a coalition of LGBT and human rights groups", "including the Human Rights Campaign, National Center for Lesbian Rights and the Southern Poverty Law Center".

In a March 2016 statement, the World Psychiatric Association asserted that there "is no sound scientific evidence that innate sexual orientation can be changed".

Brothers Road co-founder Rich Wyler called the FTC complaint an "act of hate and vicious bullying against our community of adult men—gay, bi-sexual, ex-gay and same-sex attracted men [that] choose to not identify as gay".

== Exit of David Matheson ==
In January 2019, Journey Into Manhood co-founder David Matheson announced that he was disaffiliating from BR and the LDS Church and dating men.

== See also ==
- Ex-gay movement
- Homosexuals Anonymous
- Joel 2:25 International
- ManKind Project
- Sexaholics Anonymous
- Homosexuality and the LDS Church
