= Suzanne Fei =

American bioinformatics analyst

- Born: Suzanne Dunlap
- Education: Oregon State University, Oregon Health & Science University
- Occupations: Computational genomics analyst and core director
- Employer(s): Oregon Health & Science University
- Spouse: Yiyang Fei

Suzanne Fei is an American bioinformatics analyst. Since 2017, she has directed a Bioinformatics & Biostatistics Core at Oregon Health & Science University in Portland, Oregon. Fei was born in California and raised in Janesville, California, and later Coquille, Oregon. At birth she was placed for adoption by LDS Family Services. She was reunited with her birth mother, Brooke Hemming, while in graduate school. Her birth mother is also in the sciences as a Senior Physical Scientist with the Environmental Protection Agency. Fei is an advocate for LGBTQ Mormons and has served on the steering committee for Mormons Building Bridges and the ally committee for the organization Affirmation: LGBT Mormons, Families & Friends.

== Career ==
Fei obtained degrees in computer science and biochemistry from Oregon State University and earned a PhD in biomedical informatics from Oregon Health & Science University. Her dissertation title is "Integrating Genetics and Proteomics to Study Alcohol-drinking Behavior." She is now the Core Director for the Bioinformatics & Biostatistics Core at the Oregon National Primate Research Center at Oregon Health and Science University.

== Personal life ==
Fei is married to software engineer Yiyang Fei and they have a daughter and a son. She is a member of the Church of Jesus Christ of Latter-day Saints and lives in Oregon.

== Publications ==
Fei is listed as "Data Coordinator" as the fifteenth among the approximately 600 authors of the paper Raphael BJ, et al. Integrated genomic characterization of pancreatic ductal adenocarcinoma. Cancer cell. 2017 Aug 14;32(2):185-203, which has been cited 217 times according to Google Scholar

Fei's most cited other publications are:

- Fei SS, Wilmarth PA, Hitzemann RJ, McWeeney SK, Belknap JK, David LL. Protein database and quantitative analysis considerations when integrating genetics and proteomics to compare mouse strains. Journal of proteome research. 2011 May 9;10(7):2905-12. Cited 19 times according to Google Scholar
- Kulesz-Martin M, Lagowski J, Fei S, Pelz C, Sears R, Powell MB, Halaban R, Johnson J. Melanocyte and keratinocyte carcinogenesis: p53 family protein activities and intersecting mRNA expression profiles. In Journal of Investigative Dermatology Symposium Proceedings 2005 Nov 1 (Vol. 10, No. 2, pp. 142–152). Cited 17 times according to Google Scholar
- Fei SS, Mitchell AD, Heskett MB, Vocke CD, Ricketts CJ, Peto M, Wang NJ, Sönmez K, Linehan WM, Spellman PT. Patient-specific factors influence somatic variation patterns in von Hippel–Lindau disease renal tumours. Nature communications. 2016 May 13;7:11588. Cited 13 times according to Google Scholar
