= Sutherland Institute =

US think tank

Coordinates: 40.7690°N 111.8916°W

- Formation: 1995; 31 years ago
- Founder: Gaylord K. Swim
- Type: Public policy think tank
- Tax ID no.: 87-0531727
- Legal status: 501(c)(3) think tank
- Headquarters: 420 E South Temple, Suite 510, Salt Lake City, Utah
- Location: Salt Lake City, Utah
- President: Rick B. Larsen
- Revenue: $2.08 million (2024)
- Expenses: $2.22 million (2024)
- Staff: 12 (2024)
- Volunteers: 8 (2024)
- Website: www.sutherlandinstitute.org

Sutherland Institute is a conservative public policy think tank located in Salt Lake City, Utah. The institute was founded in 1995 by Utah businessman and philanthropist Gaylord K. Swim. The Sutherland Institute believes that families, private initiatives, voluntary associations, churches, and businesses are better than the government at solving problems.

== Organization ==
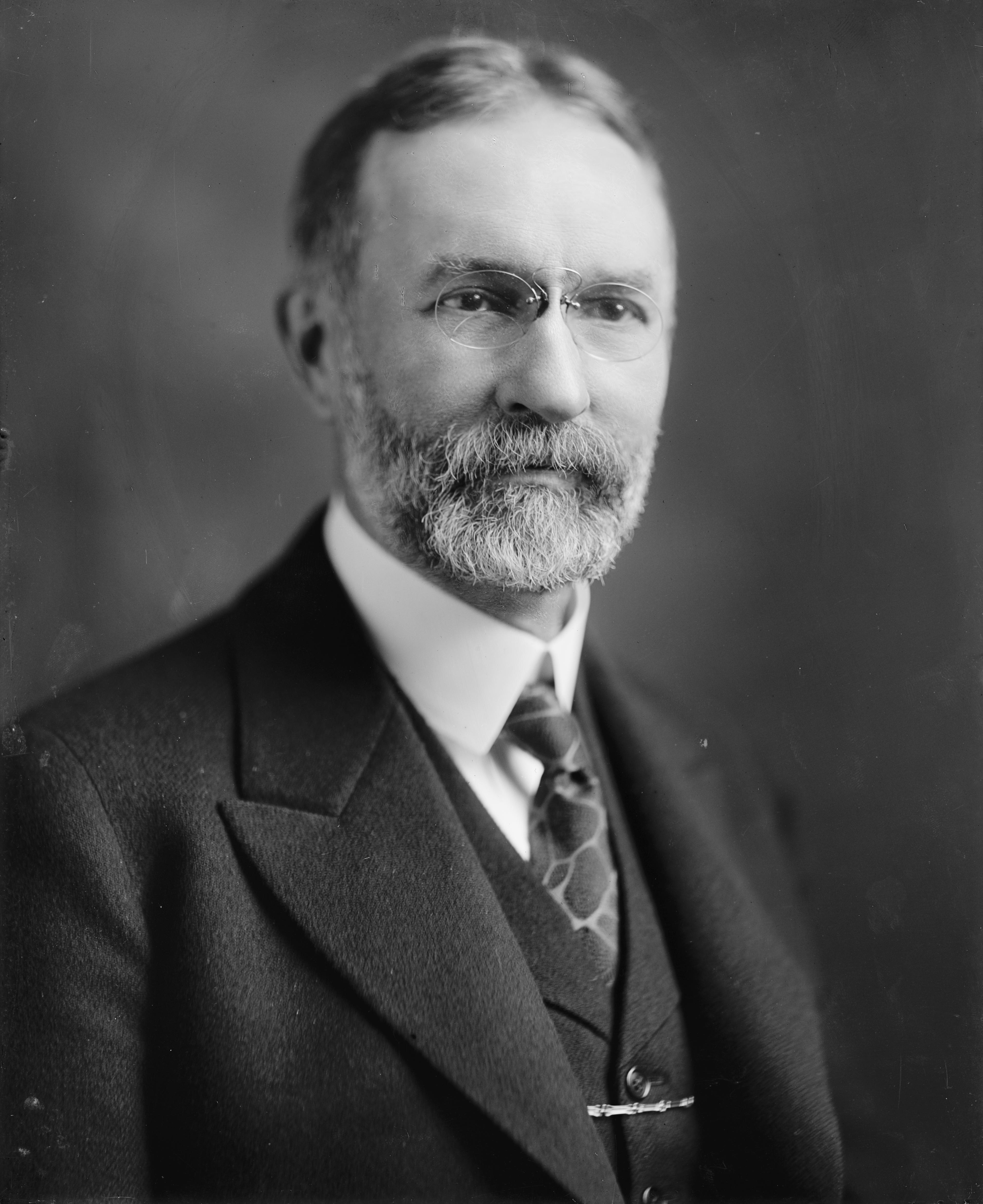
George Sutherland, the Institute's namesake

The Sutherland Institute is a 501(c)(3) non-profit organization. According to the institute's website, Sutherland does not perform contract work or accept government grants.

The institute is named for George Sutherland, the first Utahn to serve on the U.S. Supreme Court. Sutherland also served as a United States senator prior to being appointed to the bench in 1922. The Sutherland Institute was founded in 1995 by Gaylord K. Swim. Swim was a noted Utah businessman and philanthropist. He died in 2005.

Rick B. Larsen serves as president and CEO of the institute. Prior presidents include Paul Mero, who served from 2000 until 2014, when he stepped down at the board's request. He was replaced by Stanford Swim, son of founder Gaylord Swim, as interim president. In March 2016, Boyd Matheson, a former chief of staff for US Senator Mike Lee, was appointed president of the think tank until he stepped down in January 2018 for a position at Deseret News and Larsen (then vice president of development) was appointed by the board.

In 2016, the institute had fifteen staffers and a $3 million annual budget.

== Policy positions ==
Economic policy

The institute's policy research on Utah's economy has focused on issues such as health care and property tax reform. The institute has advocated for increased charity health care as a method to provide health services for the uninsured (in place of government welfare or assistance programs).

Education policy

Sutherland has advocated for greater educational freedom and less reliance on public schools. In March 2007, Utah became the first state to pass a universal school voucher law. The voucher law, which was supported by the institute, was overturned by referendum vote in November 2007. During the run-up to the referendum election, Sutherland issued a publication that presented the institute's view on the history of education in Utah. Sutherland released a subsequent companion article in a peer-reviewed law journal as part of an academic conference about school choice.

Sutherland's then-president Paul Mero collaborated with Daniel Witte, Sutherland's lead attorney, to publish a book titled Removing Classrooms from the Battlefield: Liberty, Paternalism, and the Redemptive Promise of Educational Choice, which focuses on the historical evolution of the parental liberty Doctrine.

Immigration policy

In 2008, Sutherland issued two reports on illegal immigration in Utah, Onus or Opportunity: Conservatism and Illegal Immigration in Utah and Utah's Citizens and Illegal Immigrants: Side-by-Side. These reports, which concluded that "we should welcome all people of good will to our state" drew criticism from Republican politicians and praise from the editorial board of the Deseret News, which wrote that Sutherland's immigration policy "stands squarely on the side of compassion, accommodation, and realistic reforms."

Family policy

In 2005, Sutherland contacted 232 local Utah governments with a proposal for a resolution whereby cities would state their support of Sutherland's definition of the family as a man, woman, and children. One city, Kanab, Utah, accepted and enacted the resolution, which was criticized as homophobic by some city residents and elected officials.

In 2013, former institute president Paul Mero voiced opposition to the annual Sundance Film Festival, saying Utah taxpayers should not have to subsidize a festival which featured obscenity and pornography.

The institute's opposition to a state-proposed nondiscrimination law placed it at odds with the Church of Jesus Christ of Latter-day Saints, which was pushing for the ordinance in place of more sweeping societal changes. Mero's involvement in the matter was later cited by the institute's board of directors as a reason that he was asked to resign in August 2014.

Limited government

In February 2007, Edwin Feulner announced the creation of Sutherland's Center for Limited Government, to focus on limiting the size and scope of government, promoting government transparency, and ending taxpayer subsidies of private companies.

Environment

In November 2002, Paul Mero presented a speech entitled "Why I'm Not an Environmentalist" at a conference called Dialogue Utah organized by Utah Issues, Sutherland, the University of Utah Hinckley Institute of Politics and the Utah Foundation, a politically neutral public policy research group.

== See also ==
- State Policy Network
- Libertas Institute (Utah)
