= Medical views of conversion therapy =

Many health organizations around the world have denounced and criticized efforts to change individuals' sexual orientation and gender identity. National health organizations in the United States have stated that there has been no scientific demonstration of conversion therapy's efficacy in the last fifty years, finding that conversion therapy is ineffective and potentially harmful. Anecdotal claims of cures are counterbalanced by assertions of harm. The American Psychiatric Association cautions ethical practitioners under the Hippocratic Oath to do no harm and to thus refrain from attempts at conversion therapy.

Mainstream medical bodies state that conversion therapy can be harmful because it may exploit guilt and anxiety, thereby damaging self-esteem and leading to depression and even suicide. There is also concern in the mental health community that the advancement of conversion therapy can cause social harm by disseminating inaccurate views about gender identity, sexual orientation, and the ability of LGBTQ people to lead happy, healthy lives.

== List of health organizations critical of conversion therapy ==
Major health organizations critical of conversion therapy include:

=== Multi-national health organizations ===
- World Psychiatric Association
- World Medical Association
- Pan American Health Organization regional office of the World Health Organization
- International Society of Psychiatric-Mental Health Nurses

=== Australian health organizations ===
- Australian Medical Association
- Australian Psychological Society
- National LGBTI Health Alliance
- Royal Australian College of General Practitioners - operates a unit titled Sex, sexuality, gender diversity and health as part of its curriculum for aspiring general practitioners and for professional development. It is intended to foster the provision of "non-judgmental holistic care that is affirming and positive when disclosure occurs and based on sound knowledge of any mental or physical health risks and requirements for screening, because like many others in the Australian population, many sex, sexuality and gender diverse individuals do not want to be solely defined by their gender or sexual identity."
- Royal Australasian College of Physicians - President Dr. Catherine Yelland stated in a press release issued by the college that "[g]ay conversion therapy is unethical, harmful and not supported by medical evidence".
- Royal Australian and New Zealand College of Psychiatrists

=== Canadian health organizations ===
- Canadian Psychological Association
- Public Health Agency of Canada

=== Hong Kong health organizations ===
- Hong Kong College of Psychiatrists
- Hong Kong Psychological Society

=== Indian health organizations ===
- National Medical Commission.
- Indian Psychiatric Society
- Indian Association of Clinical Psychologists
- Association of Psychiatric Social Work Professionals
- Centre of Mental Health Law and Policy

=== UK health organizations ===
- National Association of School Psychologists
- UK Council for Psychotherapy
- British Association for Counselling and Psychotherapy
- British Psychological Society
- British Psychoanalytic Council
- Royal College of Psychiatrists
- British Association for Behavioural and Cognitive Psychotherapies
- Association of Christian Counsellors
- National Counselling Society
- Scottish National Health Service
- English National Health Service
- Royal College of General Practitioners

=== US health organizations ===
- American Medical Association
- American Psychiatric Association
- American Association for Marriage and Family Therapy
- American Counseling Association
- National Association of Social Workers
- American Academy of Pediatrics
- American Academy of Physician Assistants
- American Association of Sexuality Educators, Counselors and Therapists
- Annals of Family Medicine
- American Foundation for Suicide Prevention
- American Psychological Association (APA)

==== APA taskforce study ====
The American Psychological Association (APA) undertook a study of the peer-reviewed literature in the area of sexual orientation change efforts (SOCE) and found several issues with the procedures used in conducting the research. The taskforce did find that some participants experienced a lessening of same-sex attraction and arousal, but that these instances were "rare" and "uncommon". The taskforce concluded that, "given the limited amount of methodically sound research, claims that recent SOCE is effective are not supported". An issue with SOCE claims is that conversion therapists falsely assume that homosexuality is a mental disorder. Additionally, their research focuses almost exclusively on gay men and rarely includes lesbians.

=== Other health organizations ===
- Albanian Order of Psychologists
- Brazilian Federal Council of Psychology
- Chilean College of Psychologists
- Israel Medical Association
- Lebanese Psychiatric Society
- Norwegian Psychiatric Association
- Psychological Society of Ireland
- Spanish Psychological Association
- South African Society of Psychiatrists

== Self-determination ==
The American Psychological Association's code of conduct states that "Psychologists respect the dignity and worth of all people, and the rights of individuals to privacy, confidentiality, and self-determination", but also that "Psychologists are aware that special safeguards may be necessary to protect the rights and welfare of persons or communities whose vulnerabilities impair autonomous decision making." The American Counseling Association says that "it is of primary importance to respect a client's autonomy to request a referral for a service not offered by a counselor". They said that no one should be forced to attempt to change their sexual orientation against their will, including children being forced by their parents.

Supporters of SOCE focus on patient self-determination when discussing whether therapy should be available. Mark Yarhouse, of Pat Robertson's Regent University, wrote that "psychologists have an ethical responsibility to allow individuals to pursue treatment aimed at curbing experiences of same-sex attraction or modifying same-sex behaviors, not only because it affirms the client's rights to dignity, autonomy, and agency, as persons presumed capable of freely choosing among treatment modalities and behavior, but also because it demonstrates regard for diversity". Yarhouse and Throckmorton, of the private Christian school Grove City College, argue that the procedure should be available out of respect for a patient's values system and because they find evidence that it can be effective. Haldeman similarly argues for a client's right to access to therapy if requested from a fully informed position: "For some, religious identity is so important that it is more realistic to consider changing sexual orientation than abandoning one's religion of origin ... and if there are those who seek to resolve the conflict between sexual orientation and spirituality with conversion therapy, they must not be discouraged."

In response to Yarhouse's paper, Jack Drescher argued that "any putative ethical obligation to refer a patient for reparative therapy is outweighed by a stronger ethical obligation to keep patients away from mental health practitioners who engage in questionable clinical practices". Chuck Bright wrote that refusing to endorse a procedure that "has been deemed unethical and potentially harmful by most medical and nearly every professional psychotherapy regulating body cannot be justifiably identified as prohibiting client self-determination". Some commentators, recommending a hard stand against the practice, have found therapy inconsistent with a psychologist's ethical duties because "it is more ethical to let a client continue to struggle honestly with her or his identity than to collude, even peripherally, with a practice that is discriminatory, oppressive, and ultimately ineffective in its own stated ends". They argue that clients who request it do so out of social pressure and internalized homophobia, pointing to evidence that rates of depression, anxiety, alcohol and drug abuse and suicidal feelings are roughly doubled in those who undergo therapy.

Haldeman argues that, due to concern for people whose "spiritual or religious concerns" may assume priority over their sexual orientation, mental health organizations do not ban conversion therapy outright.

== Ethics guidelines ==
In 1998, the American Psychiatric Association issued a statement opposing any treatment which is based upon the assumption that homosexuality is a mental disorder or that a person should change their orientation, but did not have a formal position on other treatments that attempt to change a person's sexual orientation. In 2000, they augmented that statement by saying that as a general principle, a therapist should not determine the goal of treatment, but recommends that ethical practitioners refrain from attempts to change clients' sexual orientation until more research is available.

The American Counseling Association has stated that they do not condone any training to educate and prepare a counselor to practice conversion therapy. Counselors who do offer training in conversion therapy must inform students that the techniques are unproven. They suggest counselors do not refer clients to a conversion therapist or to proceed cautiously once they know the counselor fully informs clients of the unproven nature of the treatment and the potential risks. However, "it is of primary importance to respect a client's autonomy to request a referral for a service not offered by a counselor". A counselor performing conversion therapy must provide complete information about the treatment, offer referrals to gay-affirmative counselors, discuss the right of clients, understand the client's request within a cultural context, and only practice within their level of expertise.

In 2012 the British Psychological Society issued a position statement opposing any treatments that are based on an assumption that non-heterosexual orientations are pathological.

A 2013 article by the Committee on Adolescence of the American Academy of Pediatrics stated "Referral for 'conversion' or 'reparative therapy' is never indicated; therapy is not effective and may be harmful to LGBTQ individuals by increasing internalized stigma, distress, and depression."

In 2014, the American Association of Christian Counselors amended its code of ethics to eliminate the promotion of conversion therapy for homosexuals and encouraged them to be celibate instead. An article in the American Medical Association's Journal of Ethics argues that if a pediatrician learns that parents of a 12-year-old patient seek conversion therapy, the pediatrician can advise against "the ineffective and potentially harmful intervention" while being culturally sensitive of their religious objections to homosexuality. The authors argue that the doctor's medical ethics means they should place the interests of the patient above the cultural sensitivities of the parents, and confidentially counsel the patient about resources for LGBT youth facing bullying, and advise the parents about resources for parents of LGBT children. In 2014, major therapy professional bodies in the United Kingdom issued a joint consensus statement opposing conversion therapy. Professional bodies supporting the statement included the UK Council for Psychotherapy, the British Psychoanalytic Council, the Royal College of Psychiatrists, the British Association for Counselling and Psychotherapy, the British Psychological Society and the National Counselling Society.

In 2015, the APA and the Substance Abuse and Mental Health Services Administration collaborated on a report stating "conversion therapy—efforts to change an individual's sexual orientation, gender identity, or gender expression—is a practice that is not supported by credible evidence and has been disavowed by behavioral health experts and associations. Conversion therapy perpetuates outdated views of gender roles and identities as well as the negative stereotype that being a sexual or gender minority or identifying as LGBTQ is an abnormal aspect of human development. Most importantly, it may put young people at risk of serious harm."

In 2015, with support of the UK Government's Department of Health, a wide range of UK organisations signed a memorandum of understanding (MoU) setting out an agreed framework for activities by parties concerned to help address the issues raised by the practice of conversion therapy in the UK. In addition to many of the professional bodies that previously issued the consensus statement, signatories included the UK Association of Christian Counsellors, the Royal College of General Practitioners, NHS England and NHS Scotland. The signatory organisations recognised a shared commitment to protecting the public from the risks of conversion therapy. They committed to raise awareness among healthcare professionals and psychological therapists of ethical issues involved in conversion therapy and to provide training to enable therapists to support clients in distress in an appropriate way.

In 2018, the APA reaffirmed its recommendation that ethical practitioners refrain from attempting to change their patient's sexual orientation and recommended they also respect the identities of those with diverse gender expressions. It encourages psychotherapies which affirm individuals' sexual orientations and gender identities and "encourages legislation which would prohibit the practice of "reparative" or conversion therapies that are based on the a priori assumption that diverse sexual orientations and gender identities are mentally ill."

== International medical views ==
The World Health Organization's ICD-10, which along with the DSM-IV is widely used internationally, states that "sexual orientation by itself is not to be regarded as a disorder".

In 2012, the Pan American Health Organization (the North and South American branch of the World Health Organization) released a statement cautioning against services that purport to "cure" people with non-heterosexual sexual orientations as they lack medical justification and represent a serious threat to the health and well-being of affected people, and noted that the global scientific and professional consensus is that homosexuality is a normal and natural variation of human sexuality and cannot be regarded as a pathological condition. The Pan American Health Organization further called on governments, academic institutions, professional associations and the media to expose these practices and to promote respect for diversity. The World Health Organization affiliate further noted that gay minors have sometimes been forced to attend these "therapies" involuntarily, being deprived of their liberty and sometimes kept in isolation for several months, and that these findings were reported by several United Nations bodies. Additionally, the Pan American Health Organization recommended that such practices be denounced and subject to sanctions and penalties under national legislation, as they constitute a violation of the ethical principles of health care and violate human rights that are protected by international and regional agreements.

The development of theoretical models of sexual orientation in countries outside the United States that have established mental health professions often follows the history within the U.S. (although often at a slower pace), shifting from pathological to non-pathological conceptions of homosexuality.

=== Australia ===
Major medical and psychological bodies in Australia uniformly prohibit conversion therapy practices, with published statements having come from peak bodies representing psychologists, psychiatrists, and medical practitioners. In a statement issued jointly with the College of Psychiatrists, Royal Australasian College of Physicians President Catherine Yelland summarised the view of the Australian medical community: "[g]ay conversion therapy is unethical, harmful and not supported by medical evidence." The approaches taken by peak medical bodies is exemplified by the 2015 Australian Psychological Society Position Statement, which declares (emphasis in original) that the:

"APS strongly opposes any approach to psychological practice or research that treats lesbians, gay men, and bisexual people as disordered. The APS also strongly opposes any approach to psychological practice or research that attempts to change an individual's sexual orientation."

The Position Statement supports this position by reference to the Society's Code of Ethics, which were adopted in 2007 and mandated as the Code of Ethics for Australian psychologists in 2010 by the Psychology Board of Australia. Under the Code, psychologists are required to "avoid discriminating unfairly against people on the basis of age, religion, sexuality, ethnicity, gender, disability, or any other basis proscribed by law" and mandates that they

"(a) communicate respect for other people through their actions and language;
(b) do not behave in a manner that, having regard to the context, may reasonably be perceived as coercive or demeaning;
(c) respect the legal rights and moral rights of others; and
(d) do not denigrate the character of people by engaging in conduct that demeans them as persons, or defames, or harasses them."

The Position Statement explicitly states that this ethical "requirement not to discriminate and to respect clients' moral rights does not equate to a justification to treat homosexuality or bisexuality as a disorder requiring treatment," relying on the Code of Ethics' section on propriety: "psychologists only provide psychological services within the boundaries of their professional competence [which] includes but is not restricted to ... basing their service on established knowledge of the discipline and profession of psychology". Regarding the knowledge base relating to conversion therapy, the statement is unequivocal (emphasis in original):

"There is no peer-reviewed empirical psychological research objectively documenting the ability to 'change' an individual's sexual orientation. Furthermore, there is no peer-reviewed empirical psychological research demonstrating that homosexuality or bisexuality constitutes a disorder. In addition to the lack of empirical support for the claim that sexual orientation can be changed, empirical evidence indicates that attempts at changing sexual orientation can be harmful."

The Society's position concludes by noting that it "is, of course, appropriate for psychologists to provide clinical services to clients who experience distress in regards to their sexual orientation ... [but this practice] should seek to understand the reasons for distress and how it may be alleviated. Evidence-based strategies to alleviate distress do not include attempts at changing sexual orientation, but could include challenging negative stereotypes, seeking social support, and self-acceptance, among others."

== Sources ==
- Bright, Chuck (December 2004), "Deconstructing Reparative Therapy: An Examination of the Processes Involved When Attempting to Change Sexual Orientation", Clinical Social Work Journal, 32 (4): 471–481, doi:10.1007/s10615-004-0543-2, S2CID 189871877
- Drescher, Jack (2001), "Ethical Concerns Raised When Patients Seek to Change Same-Sex Attractions", Journal of Gay & Lesbian Psychotherapy, 5 (3/4): 183, doi:10.1300/j236v05n03_11, S2CID 146736819
- Shidlo, Ariel; Schroeder, Michael (2002a), "Changing Sexual Orientation: A Consumers' Report", Professional Psychology: Research and Practice, 33 (3): 249–259, doi:10.1037/0735-7028.33.3.249
- Yarhouse, Mark A.; Throckmorton, Warren (2002), "Ethical Issues in Attempts to Ban Reorientation Therapies", Psychotherapy: Theory, Research, Practice, Training, 39 (1): 66–75, doi:10.1037/0033-3204.39.1.66
