= Mormons Building Bridges =

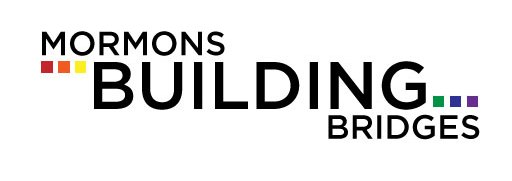
- Founded: 2012; 14 years ago
- Type: 501(c)(3) nonprofit organization

Mormons Building Bridges is a decentralized grassroots group composed primarily of members of the Church of Jesus Christ of Latter-day Saints (LDS Church) who seek to improve the attitudes between members of the LDS Church and the LGBT community.

== Overview ==
They facilitate communication and organizational efforts that help their gay members and friends to feel welcome within their church congregations and supported in their life’s path, focusing on ameliorating the experiences of LGBTQIA Mormon youth in hopes of decreasing the rates of their homelessness and suicides. MBB states they are not sponsored by nor do they represent the LDS Church.

== History ==
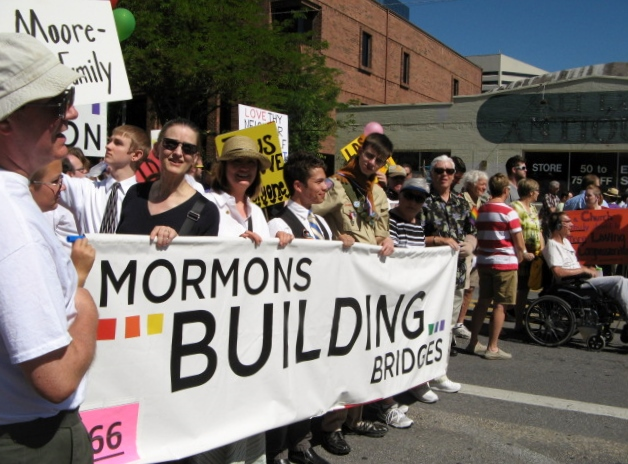
MBB marching in the SLC Pride Parade

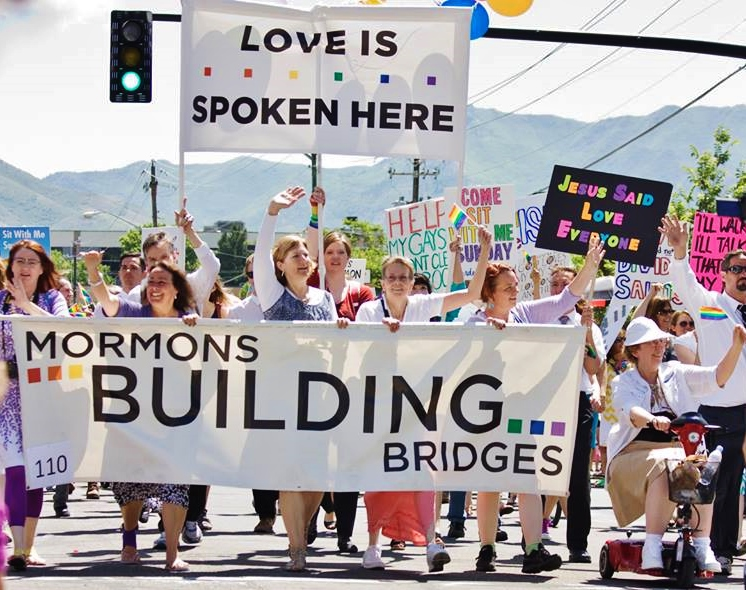
Over 400 Mormons marched in the 2014 SLC Pride Parade - Photo by Jay Jacobsen

MBB was founded in 2012 by Erika Munson, Kendall Wilcox and Bianca Morrison Dillard. The first official act of the group was to march in the Salt Lake City Gay Pride Parade on June 3, 2012. Subsequently, Mormons Building Bridges was named Utahns of the Year by The Salt Lake Tribune on January 10, 2013.

== Activities ==
A large group of MBB members march in the Salt Lake City Pride parade each year with over 400 Mormons marching in the 2013 and 2014 parades to loud applause. Smaller groups also march behind the MBB banner in other cities.

Several times a year, typically on religious holidays, MBB encourages its members to invite their LGBTQIA friends to attend local LDS church services in hopes of building ties between the two groups.

MBB participates in the political process when opportunities present themselves that have the support of their members and do not oppose the LDS church's position. For example, they have joined with Equality Utah to help pass an LGBTQIA non-discrimination law in Utah which is based on the city ordinances that the LDS church has officially supported in the past.

MBB also supports and endorse a number of other related efforts. They actively distribute the Family Acceptance Project materials promote the Safe and Sound program to find homes for homeless LGBTQIA youth in Utah, they participate in Pink Dot, and they encourage families to host Breaking Bread dinners where they invite Mormons and LGBTQIA friends to share a meal together and get to know each other. On the third Tuesday of each month, they hold Community Conversations on topics of interest to LGBT members at five libraries along the Wasatch Front. The public is invited. Sit With Me Sunday is an initiative to invite LGBT people to sit with friendly members in their neighborhood churches.

== Notable people ==
- Bianca Morrison Dillard
- Suzanne Fei, Computational biologist
- Erika Munson
- Kendall Wilcox
