= Paul Mero =

- Born: December 2, 1957 (age 68); Castro Valley, California USA
- Occupation: Government relations

Paul T. Mero (born December 2, 1957), worked in government affairs for Western Governors University (WGU) from 2019 to 2024. He is chairman of the board for Transcend Together, a state-based public policy group focused on lifting all Utahns to prosperity. Prior to WGU, Mero was CEO of Leadership Project for America and, prior to that, was president of the Sutherland Institute (2000–2014), a conservative think tank based in Salt Lake City, Utah.

== Background ==
Mero was born in the California Bay Area and grew up outside of Washington, DC in Fairfax County. He attended Brigham Young University from 1980 to 1984, graduating with a BA in public policy. While at BYU, Mero co-founded a conservative campus newspaper, The Western Scholar.

From 1987 to 1997, he worked in the United States Congress, serving two different House members from California. From 1987 to 1993, Mero served as press secretary and legislative assistant to California Republican congressman William E. Dannemeyer. From 1993 to 1994, he represented the Christian Action Network on Capitol Hill. From 1994 to 1997, Mero served as counselor and then chief of staff to California Republican congressman Robert K. Dornan.

In 1997, Mero left Capitol Hill to found the nonprofit Projects for America, creating SWAN, a social issues database. Projects for America merged in 1998 with the Howard Center for Family, Religion and Society in Rockford, Illinois. Mero served from 1998 to 2000 as its executive vice-president. In 1999, as part of his duties, he coordinated the meeting of the second World Congress of Families in Geneva, Switzerland.

From December 2000 to August 2014, Mero served as president of Sutherland Institute, a conservative think tank based in Salt Lake City, Utah.

From June 2015 until June 2016, Mero ran the Leadership Project for America. LPA promoted leadership, civility and free markets among public officials and published the Leadership Matrix, scoring all presidential contenders for the 2016 election. (Donald Trump received the lowest score of Republican candidates.)

From 2019 until 2024, Mero worked in government relations for WGU. Mero received his master's degree in management and leadership in 2022.

Mero is married to Sarah Ann Arntson. They have six children and twenty-four grandchildren and live in Eagle Mountain, Utah.
