= David Matheson (campaigner) =

Former advocate for ex-gay conversion therapy

David Matheson (born 1961) is an American clinical mental-health counselor based in Utah. He is known for his previous advocacy of conversion therapy. In 2019, he announced he was divorcing his wife of 34 years and intended to live as a gay man. He was involved in leadership with People Can Change (now known as Brother’s Road) and co-created the “Journey into Manhood” weekend retreat offered by that organization.

Matheson is sometimes described as a former leader within the “ex-gay” or “sexual-orientation-change-effort” movement. Once referred to by media outlets as “the intellectual godfather” of conversion therapy, he later disavowed the practice, expressing regret for the harm it caused. He currently operates a gay-affirmative counseling practice in Draper, Utah.

== Early life and education ==
David Matheson was born in 1961 in Murray, Utah, and raised in Sandy, Utah. He was raised in the Church of Jesus Christ of Latter-day Saints (LDS Church). He has described having experienced same-sex attraction since adolescence but long believed heterosexual marriage would resolve those feelings. He married at age 23 and remained married for 34 years. The couple had three children. He holds a Master of Science in Counseling and Guidance from Brigham Young University, the LDS Church’s largest school.

Matheson, a former member of the Church of Jesus Christ of Latter-day Saints, later said he had ended his membership and criticized what he described as the church’s “shame-based, homophobic-based system.” He has since stated that he fully renounced conversion therapy and expressed regret for the harm it caused.

== Career ==
In the 1990s, Matheson became involved with the now-defunct Mormon-affiliated group Evergreen International and co-authored its workbook for men. He was, early in his own career, a protégé of Joseph Nicolosi, founder of the National Association for Research & Therapy of Homosexuality (NARTH).

He later co-founded People Can Change (rebranded in 2016 as Brothers on a Road Less Traveled) and co-created the Journey into Manhood retreat program, which sought to help men reconcile conflicts between same-sex attraction and religious or cultural values.

Matheson established the Center for Gender Wholeness in Utah, where his practice centered on what he termed “gender wholeness”, counseling aimed at helping men “reduce unwanted same-sex attraction.” He began full-time practice in New Jersey in 2004, counseling only men, and the goal was always to help them develop what he called ‘gender wholeness.’ Over time, he stated that his clinical focus shifted away from attempting to alter sexual orientation toward helping clients achieve self-acceptance and reconcile faith and sexuality.

== Changing views and later work ==
Matheson has said his views began evolving around 2013 after involvement with a mixed-ideology professional dialogue group, the Reconciliation and Growth Project. By 2019 he publicly affirmed that “conversion therapy didn’t actually work, and homosexuality was never a disorder.” He has since offered counseling described as “gay-affirmative,” assisting clients who have experienced religious trauma or who are navigating conflicts between faith and sexual orientation.

== Publications ==
- Matheson, David (1993) "The Transition from Homosexuality: The Role of Evergreen International," Issues in Religion and Psychotherapy: Vol. 19 : No. 1, Article 7.
- Becoming a Whole Man: Principles and Archetypes (self-published, 2013).

== See also ==
- Alan Chambers
- John Paulk
- John Smid
