= Outline of the Church of Jesus Christ of Latter-day Saints =

Overview of and topical guide to the Church of Jesus Christ of Latter-day Saints

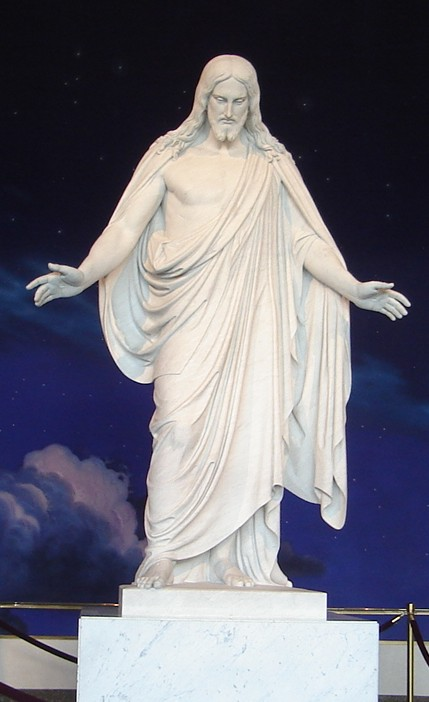
Replica of Thorvaldsen's Christus in Temple Square visitors' center

The following outline is provided as an overview of and a topical guide to the Church of Jesus Christ of Latter-day Saints.

The Church of Jesus Christ of Latter-day Saints (LDS Church or, informally, the Mormon Church) is a Christian restorationist church that is considered by its followers (often called Mormons) to be the restoration of the original church founded by Jesus Christ. The church is headquartered in Salt Lake City, Utah, and has established congregations (called wards or branches) and built temples worldwide. It is the largest denomination in the Latter Day Saint movement founded by Joseph Smith during the period of religious revival in the United States known as the Second Great Awakening.

== Nature of the church ==
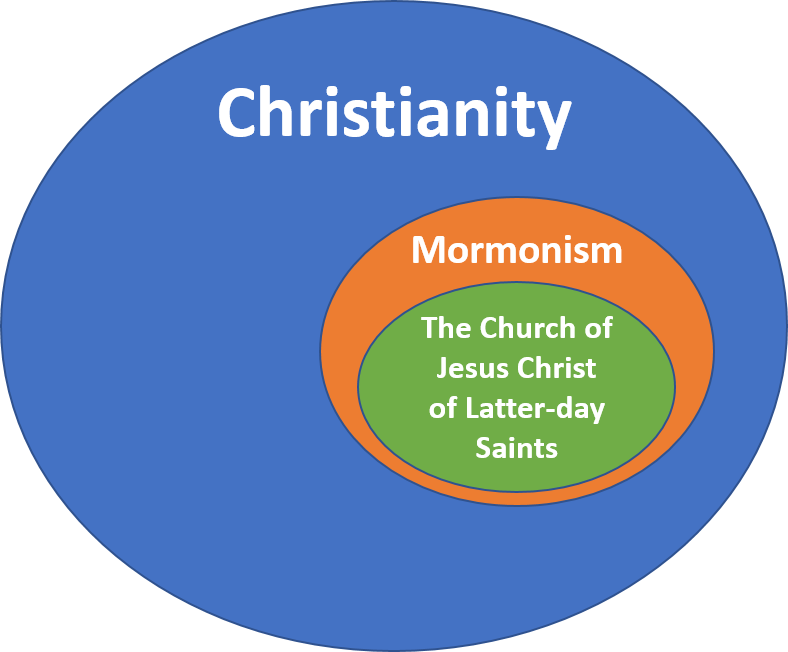
An Euler diagram showing the relationship between Christianity, Mormonism, and the Church of Jesus Christ of Latter-day Saints (not to scale)

The LDS Church can be described as all of the following:

- Belief system –
  - Religion –
    - Abrahamic religion –
      - Christianity –
        - Restorationism –
          - Latter Day Saint movement –
            - List of denominations –

== Beliefs ==
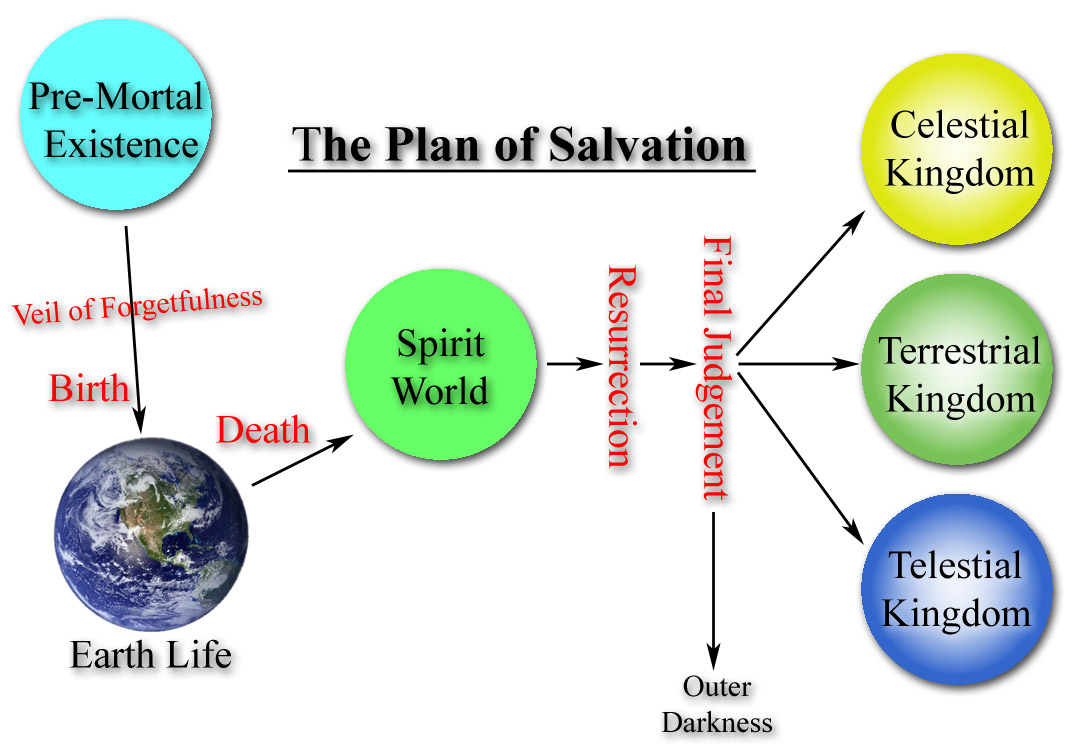
Diagram of the LDS plan of salvation

- Restoration
- Priesthood
  - Aaronic
  - Melchizedek
- Standard Works
- God
- Cosmology
- King Follett discourse
- Plan of salvation
  - Degrees of glory
  - Spirit world
- Revelation
  - Non-canonical revelations
- Ordinance
- Covenant
- Temple
- Exaltation
- Evolution
  - Timeline
- Baptism for the dead
- Suicide
- Criticism of LDS Church

=== Social principles ===
==== Gender ====
- Celestial marriage
- Mormonism and women
  - Ordain Women
- Gender minorities

==== Sexuality ====
- Birth control and abortion
- Masturbation
- Soaking

===== LGBTQ people =====
- Homosexuality teachings timeline
- Timeline of LGBTQ Mormon history
- LGBTQ Mormon people and organizations
- Sexual orientation change efforts and the LDS Church
- BYU LGBTQ history
  - Timeline
- LGBTQ Mormon suicides
- LGBTQ rights

==== Race ====
- Black people and Mormonism
  - Temple and priesthood policies
  - Joseph Smith's views on Black people
- Slavery
- Native Americans
  - Lamanites
- Interracial marriage
- Pacific Islanders
- House of Joseph

===== Laws related to Race =====
- Act for the relief of Indian Slaves and Prisoners
- Act in Relation to Service
- Indian Placement Program

===== Events related to Race =====
- Battle at Fort Utah
- Battle Creek massacre
- Bear River Massacre
- Black Hawk War (1865–1872)
- Bluff War
- Fountain Green massacre
- Salt Creek Canyon massacre
- Ute Wars

==== Duties ====
- Strengthening Church Members Committee
- Law of consecration
- Tithing (Latter Day Saints)
- Temple garment
- Calling
- Family Home Evening
- Word of Wisdom
- Missionary

== Ordinances ==
- Purpose: Exaltation

=== Non-temple ordinances ===
- Baptism in Mormonism
- Confirmation
- Baptism with the Holy Spirit
- Priesthood
- Chrism
- Hosanna shout
- Naming and blessing of children
- Patriarchal blessing
- Priesthood blessing
- Setting apart
- Shaking the dust from the feet
- Common consent
- Solemn assembly
- Sacrament

=== Temple-only ordinances ===
- Endowment (Latter Day Saints)
- Endowment
- Sealing
- Washing and anointing
- Celestial marriage
- Law of adoption
- Second anointing
- Baptism for the dead
- Right hand of Christian fellowship
- Prayer circle

== History ==
=== Early history ===
==== New York ====
- Second Great Awakening
- Burned-over district
- First Vision
- Golden plates
- Church of Christ

==== Ohio ====
- Kirtland, Ohio
- Kirtland Temple
- Sidney Rigdon
- High council
- School of the Prophets
- Joseph Smith Papyri
- Fanny Alger
- Kirtland Safety Society

==== Missouri ====
- Jackson County, Missouri
- Zion (Latter Day Saints)
- Far West, Missouri
- 1838 Mormon War
- Thomas B. Marsh
- Liberty Jail

==== Illinois ====
- History of Nauvoo, Illinois
- Nauvoo Temple
- University of Nauvoo
- Nauvoo Legion
- Second anointing
- Anointed Quorum
- William Law
- Nauvoo Expositor
- Killing of Joseph Smith
- Succession crisis

=== Pioneer Era ===
- History of the LDS Church

==== Utah ====
- Mormon pioneers
- Mormon Trail
- History of Utah
- Salt Lake City
- Council of Fifty
- Theodemocracy
- State of Deseret
- Utah Territory
- Mormon Reformation
- Jedediah M. Grant
- Heber C. Kimball
- Blood atonement
- Utah War
- Mountain Meadows massacre
- Alfred Cumming
- James Buchanan
- United Order
- Polygamy

=== Modern times ===
- Wilford Woodruff
- 1890 Manifesto
- Joseph F. Smith
- Second Manifesto
- Spencer W. Kimball
- 1978 Revelation on Priesthood
- Good Neighbor policy
- DezNat

=== By century ===
- 19th century
- 20th century
- 21st century

== Culture ==
=== Education ===
- Church Educational System
  - Brigham Young University
  - Jerusalem Center
  - BYU–Idaho
  - BYU–Hawaii
  - Ensign College
  - Sunday School
  - Institute of Religion
  - Perpetual Education Fund

=== Family history ===
- Genealogical Society of Utah
  - Sealing
  - Family History Centers
  - FamilySearch
  - Granite Mountain

=== Music ===
- Mormon music
  - Mormon Tabernacle Choir
  - Orchestra at Temple Square
  - Bells on Temple Square
  - Temple Square Chorale
  - Hymns of the LDS Church
  - Hymns in the LDS Church

=== Cinema ===
- Mormon cinema

== Mormon studies ==
- Association for Mormon Letters
- Church Historian and Recorder
- FairMormon
- John Whitmer Historical Association
- Mormon Historic Sites Foundation
- Mormon History Association
- Neal A. Maxwell Institute for Religious Scholarship
- Sunstone

Journals and Literature

- History of the Church
- The Joseph Smith Papers
- Journal of Discourses
- Encyclopedia of Mormonism
- Mormonism: A Historical Encyclopedia
- BYU Studies Quarterly
- Dialogue (journal)
- James McLachlan (scholar)
- Woman's Exponent
- International Journal of Mormon Studies
- Interpreter (journal)
- Journal of Book of Mormon Studies
- Mormon Studies Review
- Utah State Historical Society

== Polygamy ==
=== Background ===
- Origins
- In the late-19th century
- 1890 Manifesto
- Second Manifesto
- Council of Friends
- 1886 Revelation

=== Current state ===
- Mormon fundamentalism
- Fundamentalist Church of Jesus Christ of Latter-Day Saints
- Apostolic United Brethren

=== Related laws ===
- Morrill Anti-Bigamy Act
- Poland Act
- Edmunds Act
- Edmunds–Tucker Act
- Reed Smoot hearings

==== Related case laws ====
- Reynolds v. United States
- Angus M. Cannon
- Clawson v. United States
- Davis v. Beason
- Late Corp. of the LDS Church v. United States
- Cleveland v. United States (1946)
- Brown v. Buhman

=== Related articles ===
- Celestial marriage
- Spiritual wifery
- Polygamy in North America
- Mormon colonies in Mexico
- Latter-day Saint settlements in Canada
- Short Creek raid
- Lost boys (Mormon fundamentalism)
- YFZ Ranch
- Polygamy czar
- Legal status of polygamy

=== In media ===
- Big Love
- Sister Wives
- Sons of Perdition (film)
- Under the Banner of Heaven

=== Lists ===
- List of Joseph Smith's wives
- List of Brigham Young's wives
- List of Latter Day Saint practitioners of plural marriage
- List of Mormon fundamentalist leaders
- List of polygamy court cases

== Schools ==
=== Brigham Young University ===
- History
- Academic freedom
- Campus
- Buildings

==== Colleges ====
- David O. McKay School of Education
- Ira A. Fulton College of Engineering and Technology
- BYU College of Family, Home and Social Sciences
- BYU College of Fine Arts and Communications
- BYU College of Humanities
- J. Reuben Clark Law School
- BYU College of Life Sciences
- Marriott School of Management
- BYU College of Nursing
- BYU College of Physical and Mathematical Sciences
- BYU Religious Education

==== Academics ====
- Harold B. Lee Library
- Ernest L. Wilkinson Student Center
- Eyring Science Center
- Franklin S. Harris Fine Arts Center
- Gordon B. Hinckley Alumni and Visitors Center
- BYU Testing Center
- Jesse Knight Building
- Joseph Smith Building
- Maeser Building
- N. Eldon Tanner Building
- Spencer W. Kimball Tower

==== Museums ====
- Museum of Art
- Museum of Peoples and Cultures
- Museum of Paleontology
- Life Science Museum

==== Student life ====
- Student life
- Church Educational System Honor Code
- Ballroom Dance Company
- Centennial Carillon Tower
- BYU Cougars

==== Media ====
- BYUtv
- BYU Television International

==== Lists ====
- Alumni
- Faculty
- Presidents

=== Other schools ===
- Brigham Young University–Hawaii
  - Presidents of BYU-H
  - BYU–Hawaii Seasiders
  - BYU-H alumni
- Brigham Young University–Idaho
  - Presidents of BYU-I
  - BYU-I alumni

== Temples ==
- Kirtland Temple
- Nauvoo Temple
- St. George Utah Temple
- Salt Lake Temple
- Temple architecture

== Institutions of the LDS Church ==
=== Priesthood ===
==== Melchizedek ====
- Elder
- Seventy
- High priest
- Patriarch
- Apostle

==== Aaronic ====
- Deacon
- Teacher
- Priest
- Bishop

=== Quorums ===
- First Presidency
- Twelve Apostles
- Presiding Bishop
- Council on the Disposition of the Tithes
- Common Council of the Church
- Council of the Church
- High council
- Disciplinary council

=== Positions ===
- President
- President of the 12 Apostles
  - Acting President
- Prophet, seer, and revelator
- General authority
- Temple president
- Mission president
- Stake
- Church Historian and Recorder
- Branch president

==== Defunct Positions ====
- Assistant President
- Assistant to the Quorum of the Twelve Apostles
- Council of Fifty
- Regional representative of the Twelve
- Presiding Patriarch

=== Headquarters ===
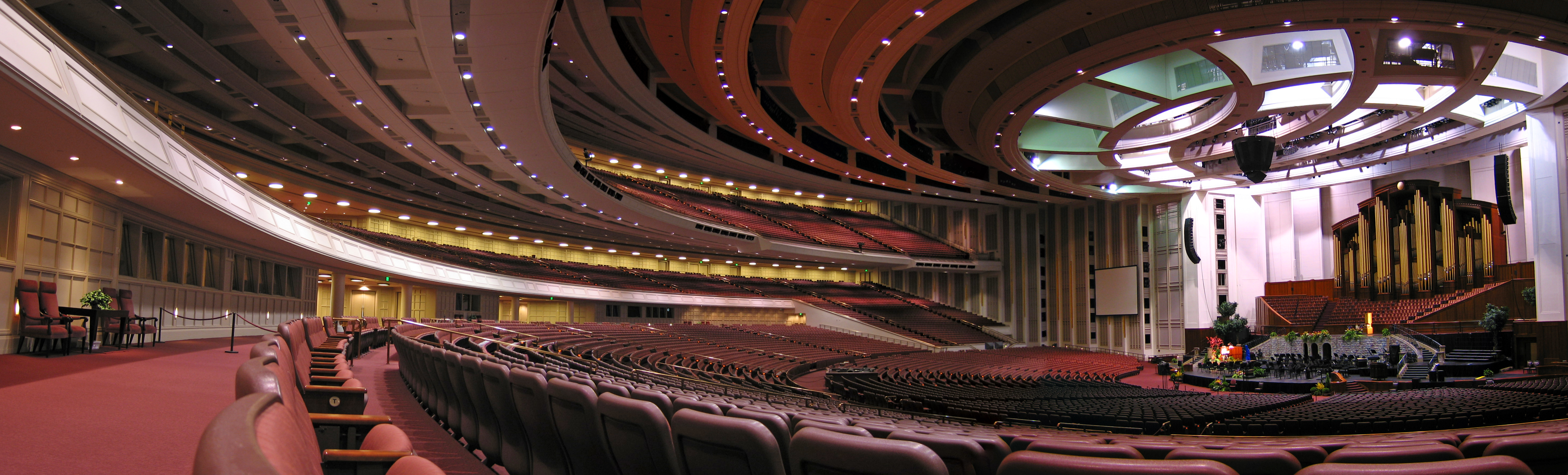
Interior of the Conference Center where the church holds its general conferences twice a year

- Salt Lake Temple
- Tabernacle
  - Tabernacle Organ
- Assembly Hall
- Gardens
- Conference Center
  - Conference Center Organ
- Church Office Building
- Joseph Smith Memorial Building
- Church Administration Building
- Relief Society Building
- Brigham Young Complex
  - Beehive House
  - Lion House
- Family History Library
- Church History Museum
- Church History Library

=== Hierarchy of leadership ===
Jesus Christ
General Authorities
The First Presidency: President of the Church, 1st Counselor and 2nd Counselor
The Quorum of the Twelve Apostles: President of the Quorum of the Twelve Apostles and eleven other Apostles
Quorums of the Seventy; The Seven Presidents of the Seventy and several dozen Seventies: First Quorum of the Seventy / Second Quorum of the Seventy
Area Presidencies: Presidents and 1st and 2nd Counselors are filled by Seventies
Local Authorities
Third through Twelfth Quorum of the Seventy (Area Seventies)					Temple Presidencies
Stake Presidencies and High Councils				Mission Presidencies	Temple Presidencies
Ward Bishoprics or Branch Presidencies			Elders Quorums	Mission Presidencies	Temple Presidencies
Deacons Quorums	Teachers Quorums	Priests Quorums	Elders Quorums	Mission Presidencies	Temple Presidencies

=== Organization ===
- Primary
- Relief Society
- Sunday School
- Young Men
- Young Women

=== Geographical divisions ===
Countries and territories with at least one LDS temple Countries and territories with no LDS temple, but with organized congregations and/or missionaries Countries and territories with no official LDS presence

- Area
  - Mission (List of)
    - District
      - Ward
      - Branch

== Texts and scriptures ==
- Criticism

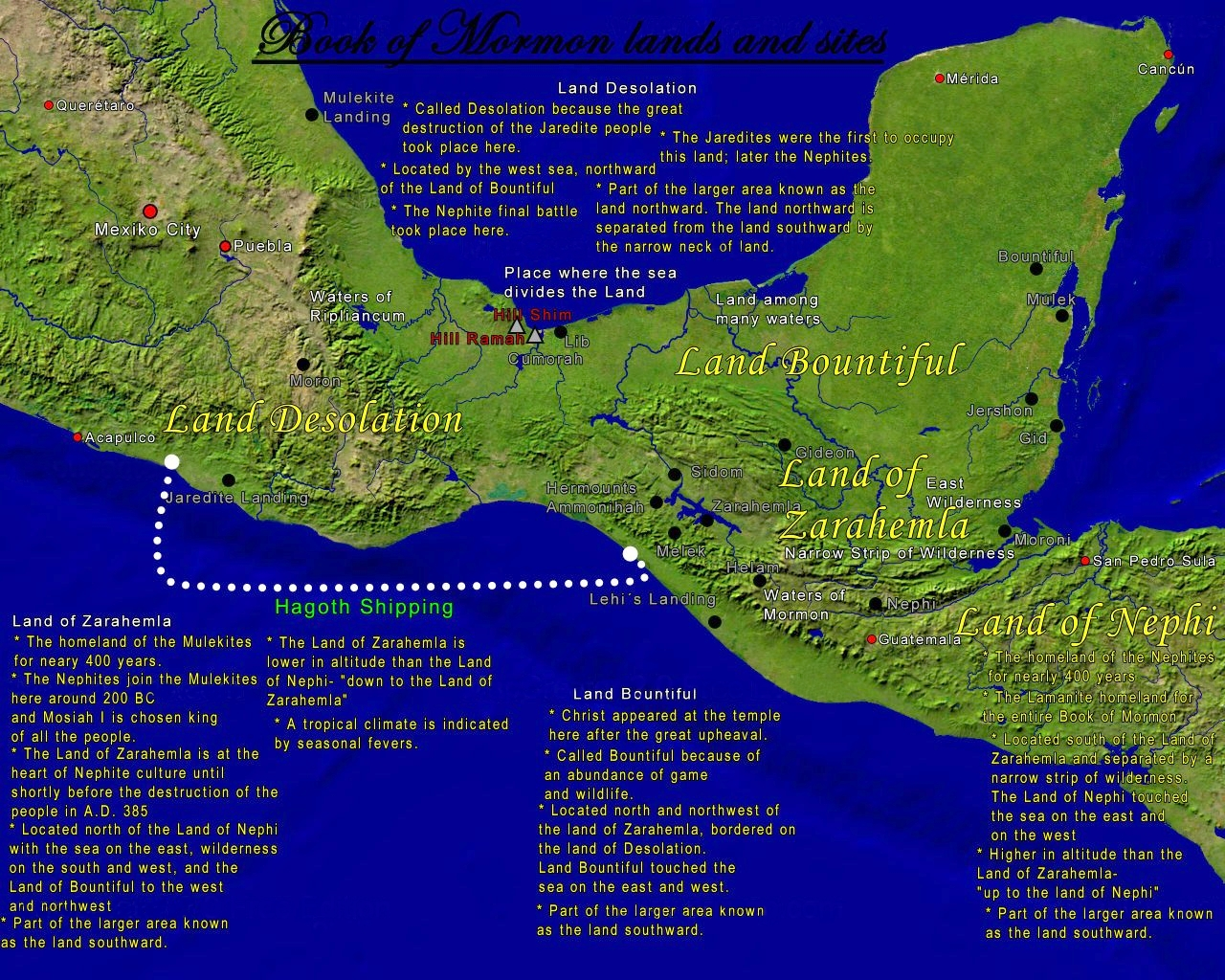
Proposed map of the lands and sites of the Book of Mormon

=== Bible ===
- LDS edition of the Bible
- Joseph Smith Translation

=== Book of Mormon ===
- Criticism
- Small Plates of Nephi
  - First Book of Nephi
  - Second Book of Nephi
  - Book of Jacob
  - Book of Enos
  - Book of Jarom
  - Book of Omni
  - Words of Mormon
- Mormon's abridgment of
  the Large Plates of Nephi
  - Book of Mosiah
  - Book of Alma
  - Book of Helaman
  - Third Nephi
  - Fourth Nephi
  - Book of Mormon
  - Book of Ether
  - Book of Moroni

=== Pearl of Great Price ===
- Book of Moses
- Book of Abraham
  - Criticism
- Book of Joseph
- Joseph Smith–Matthew
- Joseph Smith–History
- Articles of Faith

=== Other texts ===
- History of the Church
- Journal of Discourses
- The Family: A Proclamation to the World

== Important figures ==
=== =Overview ===
- President of the Church (LDS Church)
- Prophet, seer, and revelator
- President of the Quorum of the Twelve Apostles (LDS Church)
- Teachings of Presidents of the Church
- Salt Lake Temple
- Holy of Holies (LDS Church)

==== Chronological List ====
- Joseph Smith
- Brigham Young
- John Taylor (Mormon)
- Wilford Woodruff
- Lorenzo Snow
- Joseph F. Smith
- Heber J. Grant
- George Albert Smith
- David O. McKay
- Joseph Fielding Smith
- Harold B. Lee
- Spencer W. Kimball
- Ezra Taft Benson
- Howard W. Hunter
- Gordon B. Hinckley
- Thomas S. Monson
- Russell M. Nelson
- Dallin H. Oaks

=== Central figures ===
- Joseph Smith
  - Teachings
  - Prophecies
- Brigham Young
- List of presidents
  - Teachings of Presidents of the Church

==== LDS Church apostles ====
- Quorum of the Twelve Apostles
  - Chronology of the Quorum of the Twelve Apostles
    - List of members of the Quorum of the Twelve Apostles

==== Other influential figures ====
- Book of Mormon witnesses
  - Three Witnesses
  - Eight Witnesses
  - Mary Whitmer
- List of Latter Day Saints

== Groups ==
- Mormons
- Cultural Mormon
- Molly Mormon and Peter Priesthood
- Less-active Mormon
- Jack Mormon
- Ex-Mormon
- Anti-Mormon

== See also ==
- Index of articles related to the Church of Jesus Christ of Latter-day Saints
- Outline of the Book of Mormon
- Outline of Joseph Smith
