= Index of articles related to the LDS Church =

This is an index of articles about the Church of Jesus Christ of Latter-day Saints.

== 0–9 ==
- 1890 Manifesto
- 20th century warfare
- 2023 SEC charges against LDS Church

== A ==
- Aaronic priesthood
- Acting President of the Quorum of the Twelve Apostles
- Adam & Eve
- Adam-ondi-Ahman
- Adamic language
- Affirmation (LGBTQ)
- Age of accountability
- Agency
- Aiken massacre
- All Dead Mormons Are Now Gay
- Angels
- Anointing
- Anointing of the sick
- Apostle
- Architecture
- Area
- Art
- Articles of Faith
- Assistant to the Twelve
- Auxiliary organization

== B ==
- Baptism
- Baptism for the dead
- Baptismal clothing
- Beliefs & practices of the LDS Church
- Bible (LDS edition)
- Bible Dictionary
- Birth control & abortion
- Bishop
- Bishop's storehouse
- Black people
- Black people & temple & priesthood policies
- Blogosphere
- Blood atonement
- Book of Abraham
- Book of Commandments
- Book of Mormon
- The Book of Mormon musical
- Book of Moses
- Branch
- Branch president
- Brass plates
- Brigham Young
- Brigham Young University
- Brigham Young University–Hawaii
- Brigham Young University–Idaho

== C ==
- Calling
- Celestial marriage
- Children's Songbook
- Choose the right
- Christianity & Mormonism
- Church Administration Building
- Church Educational System
- Church Historian
- Church History Department
- Church History Library
- Church History Museum
- Church membership council
- Church News
- Church Office Building
- Cinema
- Circleville Massacre
- Clergy
- Common consent
- Conference Center
- Confession
- Confirmation
- Continuous revelation
- Correlation Program
- Cosmology
- Council on the Disposition of the Tithes
- Covenant
- Criticism of the LDS Church
- Culture of the LDS Church
- Cumorah
- Curses of Cain & Ham

== D ==
- Danite
- Deacon
- Denominations in the Latter Day Saint movement list
- Degrees of glory
- Deseret
- Deseret Industries
- Direct revelation
- Dispensation
- Dispensation of the fulness of times
- District
- Doctrine & Covenants

== E ==
- Elder
- Elohim
- Endowment
- Ensign
- Ensign College
- Eternal life
- Evangelist
- Evergreen International
- Evolution
- Evolution teachings timeline
- Exaltation
- Excommunication
- Exmormon Foundation

== F ==
- Family History Center
- Family History Library
- Family Home Evening
- Family Proclamation
- FamilySearch
- Fast offering
- Fast Sunday
- Fiction
- Finances of the LDS Church
- Fireside
- First Presidency
- First Presidency succession
- First Presidency chronology
- First Presidency's Christmas Devotional
- First Vision
- Folklore
- For the Strength of Youth
- Foreordination
- Foundation for Attraction Research
- Freemasonry & Mormonism
- The Friend

== G ==
- Garment
- Gathering
- Gender minorities (e.g. transgender)
- General authority
- General Conference
- General Handbook
- General officers list
- Genesis Group
- Gifts of the Spirit
- God
- Golden plates
- Good Neighbor policy
- Gospel Principles
- Great & abominable church
- Great Apostasy

== H ==
- Handcart pioneers
- Heavenly Mother
- High council
- High priest
- History of the LDS Church
- Holy of Holies
- Homosexuality
- Homosexuality teachings timeline
- House of Joseph
- Hymns
- Hymns (1985 book)

== I ==
- Improvement Era
- Indian Placement Program
- Institute of Religion
- Interracial marriage
- The Instructor
- Islam & Mormonism

== J ==
- Jehovah
- Joseph Smith
- Joseph Smith's children
- Joseph Smith's criminal charges
- Joseph Smith (killing of)
- Joseph Smith Hypocephalus
- Joseph Smith's views on Black people
- Joseph Smith's wives
- Joseph Smith–History
- Joseph Smith–Matthew
- Joseph Smith Memorial Building
- Joseph Smith Translation of the Bible
- Journal of Discourses
- Judaism & Mormonism
- The Juvenile Instructor

== K ==
- Kolob

== L ==
- Latter Day Saints list
- Lamanite
- Law of consecration
- Laying on of hands
- LDS Church vs. US
- LDS Family Services
- LDS Humanitarian Services
- LDS Motion Picture Studios
- LGBTQ BYU history
- LGBTQ BYU timeline
- LGBTQ Mormon history
- LGBTQ Mormon people & organizations
- LGBTQ rights
- LGBTQ Mormon suicides
- Liahona
- Liahona (magazine)
- Light of Christ
- Literature
- The Living Christ

== M ==
- Manifesto of 1890
- Manifesto of 1904 (Second Manifesto)
- Marriage
- Masturbation
- Meetinghouse
- Melchizedek priesthood
- Members of US Congress list
- Membership history
- Membership statistics
- Membership statistics (Canada)
- Membership statistics (United States)
- Millennial Star
- Ministering
- Mission
- Mission president
- Missionary
- Missionary Training Center
- Mixed-orientation marriage
- Mormon (Book of Mormon prophet)
- Mormon (word)
- Mormon Battalion
- Mormon colonies in Mexico
- Mormon corridor
- Mormon Trail
- Mormonism
- Mormons
- Moroni (angel)
- Moroni (prophet)
- Mountain Meadows Massacre
- Music
- Music & the Spoken Word

== N ==
- Name of the LDS Church
- Naming & blessing
- Native American people
- Nauvoo Legion
- Nephites
- New Era
- New Jerusalem

== O ==
- One true church
- Orchestra at Temple Square
- Ordinance
- Ordinance room
- Ordination
- Organization
- Outer darkness
- Outline of LDS Church

== P ==
- Pacific Islanders
- Pageants list
- Patriarch
- Patriarchal blessing
- Pearl of Great Price
- Penalty
- Personal Ancestral File
- Philanthropies
- Phrenology
- Pioneer Day
- Pioneers
- Plan of salvation
- Polygamy
- Polygamy's current state
- Polygamy's origins
- Poetry
- Politics in the US
- Prayer
- Prayer circle
- Premortal life
- President (honorific)
- President of the Church
- President of the Quorum of the Twelve Apostles
- Presiding Bishop
- Presiding Patriarch
- Priest
- Priesthood
- Priesthood blessing
- Primary
- Prophet, seer, and revelator
- Provo River Massacre
- Public relations

== Q ==
- Quorum
- Quorum of the Twelve Apostles
- Quorum of the Twelve Apostles chronology

== R ==
- Reformed Egyptian
- Regional representative of the Twelve
- Relief Society
- Relief Society Magazine
- Reorganized Church of Jesus Christ of Latter Day Saints
- Restoration
- Revelation
- Revelation on Priesthood

== S ==
- Sacrament
- Sacrament meeting
- Sacred Grove
- Saints
- Salt Lake Assembly Hall
- Salt Lake Tabernacle
- Salt Lake Temple
- Sealing
- Sealing power
- Second anointing
- Second Coming
- Second Manifesto
- Seer stone
- Seminaries
- Setting apart
- Seventy
- Sexual orientation change efforts
- Sexuality
- Single adult
- Skin color
- Soaking
- Solemn assembly
- Son of perdition
- Spirit body
- Spirit world
- Stake
- Standard works
- Stay LDS / Mormon
- Suicide
- Sunday School
- Symbolism

== T ==
- Tabernacle
- Tabernacle Choir
- Teacher
- Teachings of Presidents of the Church
- Temple
- Temple architecture
- Temple ceremonies changes
- Temple comparisons
- Temple list
- Temple list by region
- Temple president
- Temple Square
- Ten Lost Tribes
- Three Nephites
- Tithing
- Translation
- Tree of life vision

== U ==
- United Order
- Universalism & the LDS movement
- Urim & Thummim

== V ==
- Violence

== W ==
- War in Heaven
- Ward
- Washing & anointing
- Welfare Square
- Women
- Word of Wisdom
- Worship services of the LDS Church

== Y ==
- Young Men
- Young Women

== Z ==
- Zion

== See also ==
- Encyclopedia of Mormonism
- Glossary of Christianity
