= William Henry Chamberlin (philosopher) =

American Mormon theologian (1870–1921)

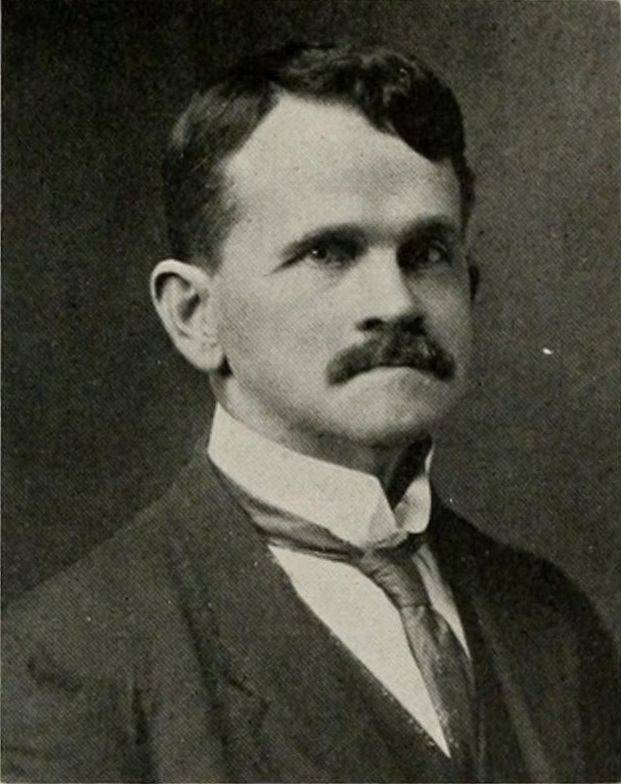
- Chamberlin c. 1914
- Born: February 12, 1870; Salt Lake City, Utah
- Died: May 9, 1921 (aged 51); Logan, Utah

Education
- Education: University of Utah; University of Chicago

Philosophical work
- Era: Modern philosophy
- School: Personalism
- Institutions: Brigham Young University (1909–1916); University of Utah (1917–1920)
- Main interests: Mormonism, higher criticism
- Notable ideas: Spiritual realism

William Henry Chamberlin Jr. (February 12, 1870 – May 9, 1921) was an American Mormon philosopher, theologian, and educator. His teachings and writings worked to reconcile Mormonism with the theory of evolution. He taught philosophy and ancient languages as well as science and math at several Latter-day Saints (LDS) institutions including Brigham Young University in the early 20th century. He was one of four educators at Brigham Young University whose teaching of evolution and attempts to reconcile it with Mormon thought, although strongly popular with students, generated controversy among university officials and the LDS community. Chamberlin has been called "Mormonism's first professionally trained philosopher and theologian."

== Biography ==
=== Early life ===
William Chamberlin was born in Salt Lake City, Utah on February 12, 1870, to parents William Henry Chamberlin and Eliza Frances Brown Chamberlin. William Jr. was the oldest of 12 children. He showed early interest in botany, geology, and mathematics. His brother Ralph Vary Chamberlin would go on to become a noted biologist and would later become embroiled with William in controversy regarding the teaching of evolution. On September 28, 1892, Chamberlin married Amelia Telle Cannon, a daughter of President George Q. Cannon, First Counselor in the First Presidency (LDS Church). William and Amelia had six children: Max Cannon, Hester, Martha, Paul, Frances, and Luke.

=== Mission and early career ===
Chamberlin's early career was divided between teaching, studying, and working to support his family. He taught in public schools from 1889 to 1891, and from 1891 to 1897 he taught math, geology, and astronomy at Latter-day Saint College. He finally completed a Bachelor of Arts in science with the University of Utah in 1896. From 1897 to 1900 he served a mission in the South Pacific Society Islands where as part of his proselytizing he translated the Book of Mormon into Tahitian, and became mission president, an ordained high priest of the Church. Around the turn of the century, he donated a large collection of ferns from Utah and the South Pacific to the University of Utah's natural history museum. From 1900 to 1904, he taught science and theology at Brigham Young College, where he was Chair of Geology and Mineralogy.

=== Philosophy and Brigham Young years ===
In 1901, Chamberlin began studying philosophy at the University of Chicago. Over several years he studied philosophy with several prominent thinkers, including George Howison at U.C. Berkeley and Josiah Royce at Harvard. He earned an M.A. from the University of Chicago in 1906.

In 1909, William Chamberlin was recruited to Brigham Young University (BYU) by president George H. Brimhall, as part of an effort to increase the academic quality of his university. Two years earlier, Brimhall had recruited brothers Joseph and Henry Peterson, professors of psychology and education, as well as Chamberlin's own brother Ralph, a biologist. William Chamberlin taught philosophy and ancient languages. The Chamberlin and Peterson brothers, while devout Mormons, actively sought to increase the intellectual atmosphere of the university and community, facilitating discussion and debates on evolution and the Bible, and sought to convey that evolutionary ideas and Mormon theology were not mutually exclusive, but rather complementary. The four instructors' courses were popular among students and other faculty, but university and church officials accused the professors of promoting heretical views, and in 1911 offered the Petersons and Ralph Chamberlin a choice: alter their teachings or lose their jobs. This ignited a great deal of controversy in the school and surrounding community. The students of BYU overwhelmingly supported the professors, and a petition of support signed by at least 80% of the student body was submitted to BYU officials and reprinted in the Salt Lake Tribune, Salt Lake City's largest secular newspaper. William Chamberlin was not given the same ultimatum, but soon after the accusations he published an essay entitled "The Theory of Evolution as an Aid to Faith in God and Belief in the Resurrection" in the BYU student newspaper, whose student editors wrote "the thoughtful reading of it will well repay any student". The Petersons and Ralph Chamberlin left the university in 1911, while William remained for another 5 years, resigning in 1916.

=== Later years ===
In 1917 Chamberlin began a PhD with Harvard philosopher Ralph Barton Perry, but left after one year due to poor health and financial troubles. He taught philosophy at the University of Utah from 1917 to 1920, and later at Utah State Agricultural College until his death.

Chamberlin died in Logan, Utah, following a flu infection on May 9, 1921. He was fifty-one years old.

== Philosophy and theology ==
Chamberlin's philosophical views have been termed "spiritual realism", and are rooted in the philosophical tradition of personalism. Mormon scholar James M. McLaughlin consolidated Chamberlin's philosophical views into five major statements:

1. Persons are eternal, they are ontologically and metaphysically ultimate. This personalism is tied to a pragmatic theory of knowledge in which truth is determined in relation to its outcome and the interests and purposes of persons.
2. Community and sociality is an essential feature of the being of persons. The moral meaning of the world grows out of the relation of eternal co-dependence of persons in community. At the head of this community is God.
3. God is a person and is the ultimate example of personal existence. God is dependent on the other members of the community of minds.
4. God's revelation in the world is limited to the capacity of human truth; it must be stated in human terms.
5. Evolution is a true and explanatory principle through which we can come to understand the development of the "Kingdom of God." Evolution must be viewed as a teleology reflecting God's design and not as a string of efficient causes.

Chamberlin was the first LDS scholar to extensively apply higher criticism to the Bible. Religious scholar Anthony Hutchinson labeled Chamberlin's style of biblical criticism (the academic study of the Bible) as a "critical historical and philological hermeneutic" approach, (Note: Philology is the study of language in historic texts, while hermeneutics is the interpretation of religious texts.) broadly characterized by acceptance of mainstream (non-LDS) biblical criticism and fluency in ancient biblical languages. According to Hutchinson, relative strengths of this approach, as compared to other LDS approaches to biblical studies, include ease of communicating with scholars of Christianity and Judaism, while relative weaknesses include a highly intellectual approach which may preclude its application to popular religious practice, and promotion of views that may be interpreted as heretical. Other LDS scholars Hutchinson grouped into this approach include Lowell L. Bennion, Sterling McMurrin, and John L. Sorenson.

In a survey of thirty-eight prominent LDS intellectuals conducted by Leonard J. Arrington in the late 1960s, Chamberlin was recognized as one of the top twelve figures in LDS intellectual history. However, Philip L. Barlow notes that Chamberlin is less well-known than other prominent LDS figures.

Students of Chamberlin's included E. E. Ericksen, who later become chairman of the Department of Philosophy at the University of Utah and who is known as a leading figure in LDS intellectual history.

== See also ==
- Mormon studies
- Theistic evolution
- Creation–evolution controversy
- Joseph Conrad Chamberlin - nephew
