= World War I and religion =

World War I, also known as the First World War or the Great War, had a major impact on global society and culture. Religion was also impacted. Christianity in both Europe and the United States served to unite fellow soldiers of the same denomination and motivated them to fight. Some European countries shared unity across denominations while others did not. In Germany, Catholic and Protestant differences caused tension while Austria-Hungary did not unify Catholic services.

== Christian institutions in Jerusalem ==
Prior to World War I, the Greek Orthodox Church received much of its income from pilgrimage; however, the war halted pilgrimage, and the impact of this, combined with a heavy tax levied on those who did not want to fight in the war contributed to the church borrowing large amounts of money that left it defective for the duration of the war.

Elsewhere, as Christian establishments dealt with the effects of the war, some were able to maintain themselves and prosper, while others experienced great loss. The war changed the relationship between Christians and Muslims in Jerusalem, and united them over a common attitude of opposition towards Jewish immigration. The war also caused the formation of new religious groups such as The Palestinian Association of Egypt. The war increased religious focus on custody of the Holy Land and local issues.

== Unity among Catholic, Protestant, and Jewish American soldiers ==
When the United States entered the First World War, the most prominent religious groups in America were Protestants, Catholics and Jews. The conflict served to unite these religions despite their differences and dissolve the idea that Jews and Catholics were inferior to Protestants. The loyalty to the same God and same country helped soldiers put aside their religious differences for the good of the war. Tense conditions still existed between these three religious groups, but efforts were made to provide equal opportunities to each. A committee called the Committee of Six represented the three faiths in the formation of new policy in the United States.

== Spiritualism ==
World War I also brought a focus on the afterlife and developed spiritualism into a religion. Spirituality was enticing to those dealing with death and loss of faith after the First World War, as some found Christianity lacking in its treatment of and beliefs about death.

== The Church of England ==
For national churches, such as The Church of England, war was heavily supported. They felt that it was their duty to pray for soldiers because they needed the grace of God. They believed that soldiers would pass through purgatory because violence was opposed to the church's belief in peace. Despite these conflicting beliefs, church leaders supported the war. Bishop Gore, a bishop of the Church of England, was one that fantasized and downplayed the realities of war in his attempt to support it.

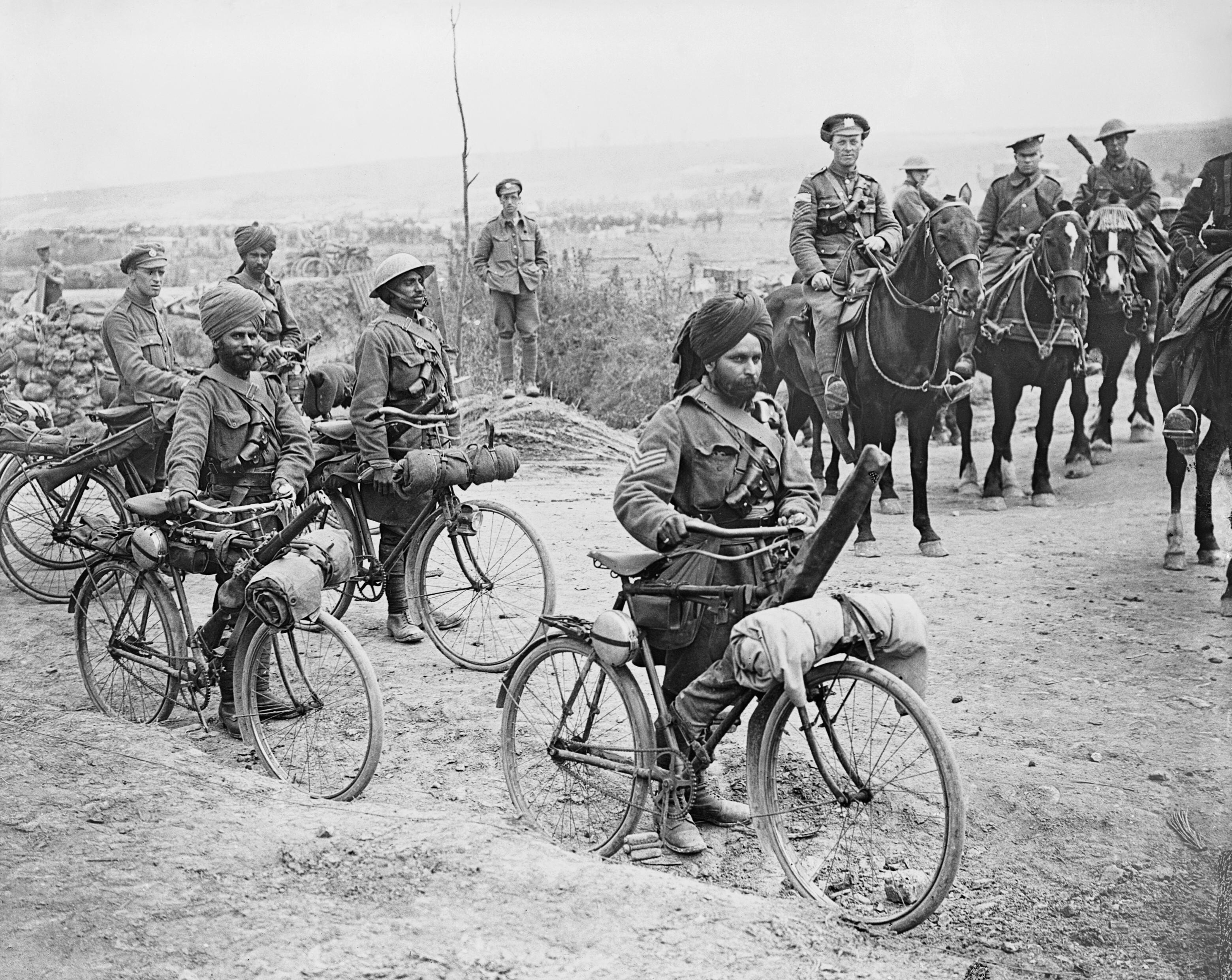
Indian bicycle troops Somme 1916 IWM Q 3983

== In the United States ==
Traditional peace denominations such as the Mennonites and the Quakers expressed antiwar sentiments. It can be said overall, however, that opponents of the war were scarce in number.

== The Vatican ==
Throughout the papacy of Pope Benedict XV, Benedict spoke out against the war having condemned it outright within the first week of his office saying, "the appalling spectacle of this war that has filled the heart with horror and bitterness, observing all parts of Europe, devastated by fire and steel, reddened with the blood of Christians". He declared that war was "the bane of God's wrath," and appealed to the Central Powers and the Allies of World War I to speedily end the war.

== Sikhism ==
Known for their bravery and distinction in warfare, Sikhs were more prominently found in the British Indian Army. Regiments were even formed strictly with members of the Sikh religion. The British Indian Army formed a core part of the British Empire and participated in a few battles during World War I, including the Battle of Gallipoli. In these battles, Sikh soldiers specifically served with great distinction and extraordinary bravery which was praised by British officials.

== The Church of Jesus Christ of Latter-day Saints ==
The participation of members from the Church of Jesus Christ of Latter-day Saints (LDS Church) in World War I provided an opportunity for members of the LDS Church to clearly define themselves to the world. In a time when many negative commentaries about the church were circulating, the War served to help in efforts to accurately portray the church. During this time, Mormons were accused of being disloyal to the United States of America. In 1886, a district attorney for the state of Utah was quoted to have said "We wish to say that the so-called Church of Jesus Christ of Latter-day Saints is steeped in disloyalty to the Government of the United States...We say, more than that, that the purpose of this Church here, one of its particular purposes, is to overthrow the American home and overturn the family altar in this country."

The soldiers of the LDS Church's active duty in the war fought against the idea that members of the LDS Church were not loyal to their country. In fact, many LDS men enlisted in the military for the sole purpose of trying to prove such accusations as false. Such soldiers also left notable impacts on their fellow comrades throughout their active participation in military service.

The LDS Church is known for its missionary work, and the case was not any different during the early years of the church. During World War I, however, missionary work was negatively affected. Many of those who would otherwise serve missions for the church, enrolled in military service, limiting the number of men available to become LDS missionaries. Areas where LDS missionaries previously proselyted, became too dangerous for such activity and as a result all LDS missionaries were taken out of Europe.

== Women of faith in the war ==
World War I made women into more influential figures in society, due to their symbolic necessity in representing their faith. It was women of faith that actively engaged in provided aid, emotionally, physically, and spiritually, to soldiers in need during the violence of the war. Additionally, women assisted in actual religious pursuits and activities. They held and supported positions that would not have been previously available to them.

Catholic women were remembered helping Priests who were overloaded with the amount of spiritual and physical aid they felt needed to be administered. They worked under such responsibilities to help people come back to their faith in Jesus Christ.

Women in the Protestant faith participated in similar ways, including providing care packages for soldiers. They even took over parishes when the pastors of such parishes were busy in other endeavors during the war. It was during this time that women were symbols during the war of religious faith and devotion to supporting their countries.

== Hinduism ==
Around 100,000 Gurkhas fought as part of the Indian Army. Gurkha battalions served at Neuve Chapelle, Loos, Givenchy and Ypres on the Western Front, and in Mesopotamia, Persia, Palestine and Gallipoli against the Turks. Gurkha regiments received hundreds of gallantry awards, including three Victoria Crosses. They also suffered over 20,000 casualties.

== Judaism ==
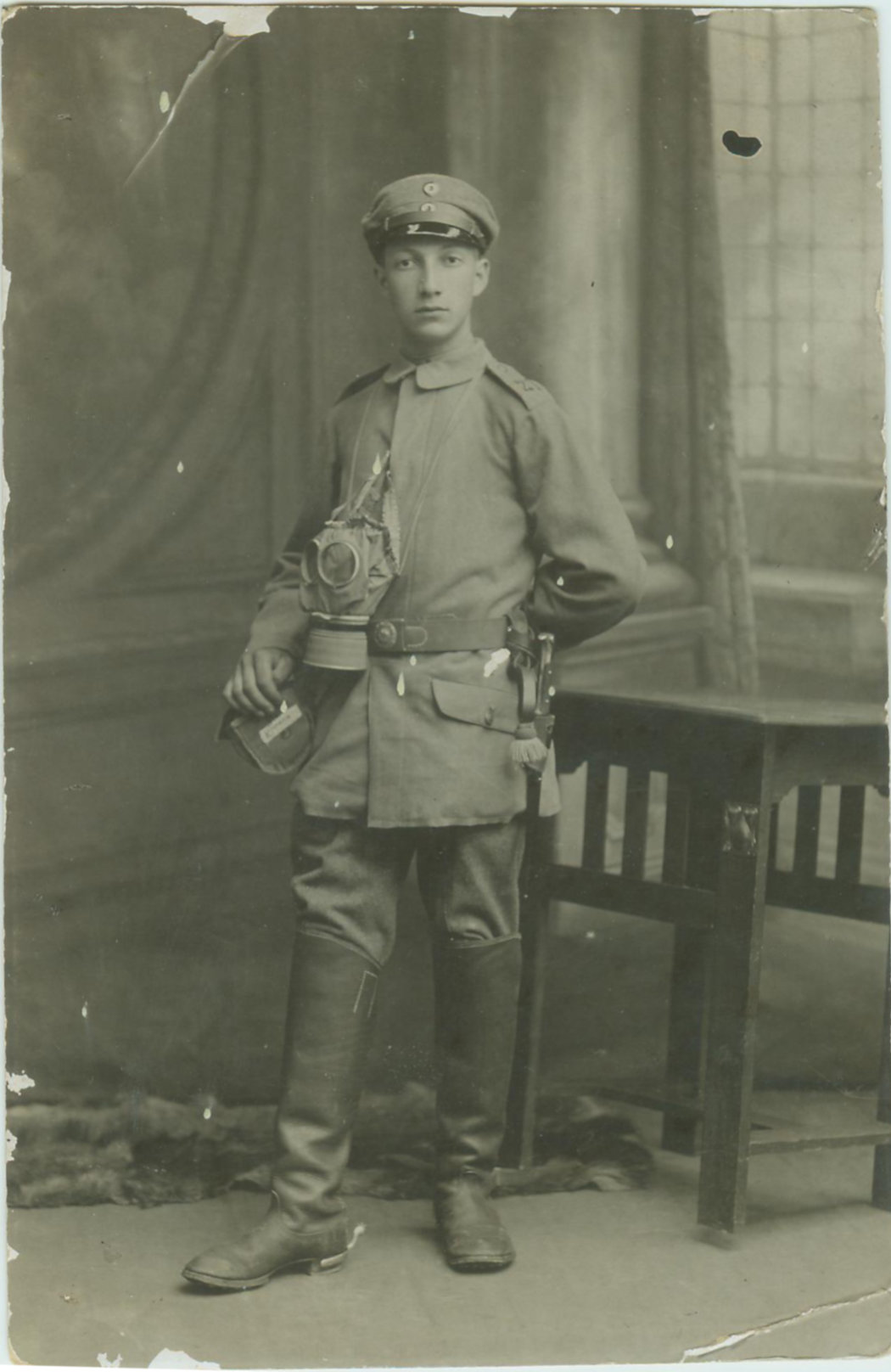
Willi Ermann, a German Jewish soldier in WW1

Jews served in the war for several different reasons, with many enlisting in order to join with fellow citizens in combat; another driving factor was the desire to engage in conflict against Russia, a nation known for being oppressive to Jews. Many felt the need to help their fellow Jewish comrades in dire circumstances.

Due to the destruction of Habsburg Monarchy and the Russian Empire, new nations were formed that developed different relations with the Jewish people than before World War I. The Jews became more recognizable and distinctive in the new states established thus creating greater Jewish influence.

== Islam ==
During World War I, the Ottoman Empire was under an immense amount of pressure to engage in the conflict. Leaders of the empire attempted to maintain neutrality for a time, but the pressure for inclusion only increased. The official religion of the Ottoman Empire during this time was Islam, making joining the war was a topic of controversy in the Islamic state, as Islamic law includes strict guidelines in regards to involvement in wars.

In October 1914, the Ottoman Empire faced enough pressure from Germany to agree to commence an attack on the Russian Navy stationed in the Black Sea. The Ottoman Empire deceptively claimed that they were attacked by Russia, hiding the fact that their presence in the Black Sea was to deliberately cause conflict with Russia. This event ultimately led to Russia's involvement in World War I.

Many argue that the Ottoman Empire's involvement was strictly due to benefits they desired for the Islamic state. Muslim scholars have argued that their participation was really an attempt to enlarge the Islamic state and grow in power and influence.

During the war, 2.5 million Muslims from British India fought for the Allies, the majority of these soldiers hailing from regions which today constitute modern day Pakistan. Although these soldiers were having problems on how to pray during the intense battles of trench warfare on the Western Front however they still fought with great distinction and some even earned Victoria Crosses, the most prominent being Khudadad Khan who was the first Indian soldier to ever be awarded the cross. Other soldiers included Mir Dast and Shahamad Khan, all three of whom were from modern day Pakistan.

Participation of thousands of Muslim soldiers from North Africa and South Asia in the war, fighting for and with the colonial powers, was one of the most significant factors that began the modern settlement of Muslims in European countries such as England and France. In many places, their contribution to the war efforts and settlement in Europe following it forced political authorities to consider things that were not done earlier, such as establishing Muslim cemeteries, financing, or at the very least allowing the building, of mosques, and more.
