= FSY =

FSY may refer to:

- Footscray railway station, in Victoria, Australia
- Forsys Metals, a Canadian mining company
- For the Strength of Youth (disambiguation), several meanings within The Church of Jesus Christ of Latter-day Saints
