= Elijah Millgram =

American philosopher (born 1958)

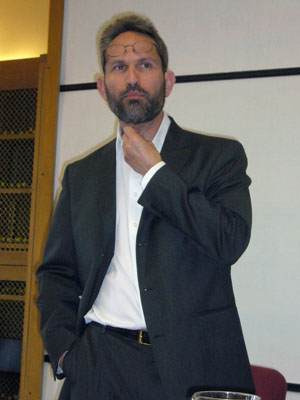
- Born: 1958 (age 67–68)
- Occupation: E.E. Ericksen professor
- Employer: University of Utah
- Known for: practical reasoning
- Website: http://www.elijahmillgram.net/

Elijah "Lije" Millgram (born 1958) is an American philosopher. He is E. E. Ericksen Professor of Philosophy at the University of Utah. His research specialties include practical reason and moral philosophy.

Elijah Millgram received his Ph.D. from Harvard University in 1991. He taught at Princeton University and Vanderbilt University before moving to Utah. He is a former fellow of the Center for Advanced Study in the Behavioral Sciences and of the National Endowment for the Humanities, and is a 2013 Guggenheim Fellow.

== Bibliography ==
- Millgram, E. (2019). John Stuart Mill and the Meaning of Life. Oxford University Press. ISBN 9780190873240
- Millgram, E. (2015). The Great Endarkenment: Philosophy for an Age of Hyperspecialization. Oxford University Press. ISBN 9780199326020
- Millgram, E. (2009). Hard Truths. Wiley-Blackwell. ISBN 978-1-4051-8815-9
- Millgram, E. (2005). Ethics Done Right: Practical Reasoning as a Foundation for Moral Theory. Cambridge University Press. ISBN 0-521-54826-8
- Millgram, E. ed. (2001). Varieties of Practical Reasoning. MIT Press. ISBN 0-262-63220-9
- Millgram, E. (1997). Practical Induction. Harvard University Press. ISBN 0-674-00073-0

== See also ==
- American philosophy
- List of American philosophers
