= Maxwell Institute =

Neal A. Maxwell Institute for Religious Scholarship
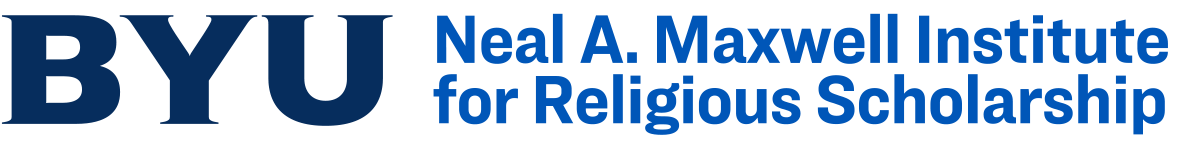
- Formation: 2006
- Type: Research Institute (Religion, Latter-day Saints)
- Headquarters: Brigham Young University
- Location: Provo, Utah, USA
- Executive Director: J.B. Haws
- Associate Director: Philip L. Barlow
- Parent organization: Brigham Young University
- Affiliations: The Church of Jesus Christ of Latter-day Saints
- Website: mi.byu.edu

The Neal A. Maxwell Institute for Religious Scholarship, or Maxwell Institute, is a research institute at Brigham Young University (BYU). The institute consists of faculty and visiting scholars who study religion, primarily the Church of Jesus Christ of Latter-day Saints (LDS Church). The institute is named after a former LDS Church apostle, known for his writings and sermons.

The LDS Church identifies the Maxwell Institute as one of several third-party church affiliates offering gospel study resources.

== History ==
The Maxwell Institute was established in 2006 as an umbrella organization for several of BYU's academic initiatives, including: the Middle Eastern Texts Initiative (METI), the Center for the Preservation of Ancient Religious Texts (CPART), the Laura F. Willes Center for Book of Mormon Studies, and the Foundation for Ancient Research and Mormon Studies (FARMS). By 2013, FARMS had become fully absorbed into the institute's Willes Center.

In 2012, a debate was sparked when the Maxwell Institute's director Gerald Bradford removed Daniel C. Peterson from a long-time editorship of the FARMS Review, shortly after it had been renamed the Mormon Studies Review. Peterson retained his position as editor of the Middle Eastern Texts Initiative (METI) until resigning in September 2013.

Under new leadership following Bradford's retirement in 2015, the Maxwell Institute underwent a series of internal and external reviews to determine its future direction. J. Spencer Fluhman was appointed director in 2016, and the Maxwell Institute began restructuring. Together with BYU administration and a new advisory board, Fluhman announced a new mission statement in March 2018.

As part of this restructuring, METI was transferred to the international publisher Brill. CPART completed its final project in 2017. The institute also published the Mormon Studies Review from 2013 through 2018, when complete ownership was transferred to the University of Illinois Press.

In November 2018, BYU announced plans to move the Maxwell Institute into the south wing of BYU's West View Building, taking place in 2020.

== Scholarship ==
The Maxwell Institute provides research positions for full-time faculty, visiting scholars, post-doctorate researchers, and other temporary research participants who study the LDS Church, as well as Christianity and other religions more broadly. Institute scholars occasionally publish in-house, but most of their work is placed in other venues.

The Maxwell Institute also includes the Laura F. Willes Center for Book of Mormon Studies, which deals principally with studying the Book of Mormon in ancient and modern settings, in addition to other LDS scripture.

The Maxwell Institute formerly hosted the William (Bill) Gay Research Chair, which focused on study directly related to the ancient world and LDS scripture, particularly the Book of Abraham. Egyptologist John Gee occupied the chair until 2018.

The Maxwell Institute frequently sponsors guest lectures at BYU, as well as symposia, workshops, and conferences on religious topics. Wednesday Brown Bag discussions allow scholars to workshop current projects, prepare for conference presentations, discuss recently published works, and examine the dimensions of "disciple-scholarship."

The Maxwell Institute also employs a small staff of office assistants, communications personnel, and a large number of student interns.

=== Criticisms ===
Commentator Michael Austin, reflecting on the institute's status as an officially sanctioned venue for Latter-day Saint theological studies, opined that resources cited within the institute's 2019 Study Edition of the Book of Mormon are "carefully curated to include only official Church sources and scholarship that supports the [LDS] Church’s conclusions," adding that he believes that "the Church has produced and authorized a version of its signature scripture that is orders of magnitude more helpful, and more scholarly, than anything it has produced before. But being official comes at a cost. Official books must tell official stories, which means that honest discussions of controversies and pressure points—no matter how important they may be to the study and interpretation of the text—cannot become part of the apparatus."

Commentator John H. Brumbaugh opined, "In a sense, New Mormon historians challenge the foundational beliefs of Mormonism in a quest for professional rigor. [...] Faithful historians never challenged foundational beliefs; instead they are intended to build the devotion of Church members. BYU Studies and Neal A. Maxwell Institute for Religious Scholarship are prime examples of Faithful history outlets. Renouncing objectivity, these organization functioned to 'Describe and defend the Restoration through highest quality scholarship.'"

Some voices in Latter-day Saint apologetics have made opposite accusations. Speaking at the 2012 conference of FairMormon (now known as FAIR), BYU professor Daniel C. Peterson accused the Maxwell Institute of "forego[ing] explicit defense and advocacy of Mormonism" by being too academic and insufficiently faithful. Former FARMS board member William J. Hamblin described the transition from FARMS to the Maxwell Institute as a "hostile takeover" that "destroyed ancient Book of Mormon Studies," and he called the Maxwell Institute a "Sunstone South," comparing it to Sunstone magazine, a Mormon studies publication perceived by some Latter-day Saints as "faith-eroding."

Hamblin's characterization of the Maxwell Institute has been disputed by Nathaniel Givens; he finds that most Maxwell Institute publications still aver, both explicitly and implicitly, that the Book of Mormon is an ancient document.

== Publications ==
Although the Maxwell Institute is not primarily a publisher, it maintains a publishing imprint and produces a handful of books and periodicals each year for both general and academic readers. Periodicals include the Journal of Book of Mormon Studies (published in partnership with the University of Illinois Press), Studies in the Bible and Antiquity (currently on hiatus), and the "Living Faith" series, among other books.

One of the Maxwell Institute's notable past publications is Royal Skousen's Book of Mormon Critical Text Project. Work from the Critical Text Project was incorporated into the Maxwell Institute Study Edition of the Book of Mormon, edited by Grant Hardy and published in partnership with BYU's Religious Studies Center and Deseret Book in 2018—the first study edition of the scripture ever published by an official church affiliate.
