= List of Brigham Young University–Hawaii alumni =

This list of Brigham Young University Hawaii alumni includes notable graduates, non-graduate former students, and current students of Brigham Young University Hawaii (BYUH).

== Academia and research ==
Name	Class year(s)	Degree(s)	Notability	Reference

== Arts ==
Name	Class year(s)	Degree(s)	Notability	Reference

== Business and finance ==
Name	Class year(s)	Degree(s)	Notability	Reference
Young Bo Chang	1979	B.A.	Awarded the National Medal from the Republic of Korea and two Presidential Medals (one from President Roh Tae Woo; one from President Kim Dae Jung) for his international work in the deep sea fishing industry	
Richie Norton	2005	B.S.	Best-selling author of The Power of Starting Something Stupid and CEO of Prouduct	

== Entertainment ==
Name	Class year(s)	Degree(s)	Notability	Reference
Clayton Thomas Kearl (aka "Gringasho")	2016	B.S.	American Internet and Instagram star in Peru known as "Gringasho"	
Preston Moss	2016	B.A.	American Internet star in Ecuador and spokesperson for the cheese company Reyqueso	
Hyram Yarbro	2018	N/A	Social media personality and skin care commentator	

== Government, law, and public policy ==
Name	Class year(s)	Degree(s)	Notability	Reference
Young Bo Chang	1979	B.A.	French Polynesia's representative on the Korea Trade Promotion Corporation	
Eni Fa'aua'a Hunkin Faleomavaega, Jr.	1964	A.A.	Delegate to Congress (D) from American Samoa	
Feki Puoha	2007	B.A.	Member of the Hawaii House of Representatives for District 47 (2014–2016)	

== Music ==
Name	Class year(s)	Degree(s)	Notability	Reference
Randall W. Boothe	1975	B.M.	Director of Light of the World and Faith in Every Footstep; former director of Disney's All American College Singers, Dancers and Show Band and artistic director for the Young Ambassadors	

== Religion ==
Note: all positions listed are within the Church of Jesus Christ of Latter-day Saints unless otherwise noted.

Name	Class year(s)	Degree(s)	Notability	Reference

== Sports ==
Name	Class year(s)	Degree(s)	Notability	Reference
Jet Chang	2012		Most Outstanding Player of the 2011 NCAA Men's Division II Basketball Tournament; member of the Chinese Taipei national basketball team	
Yuta Tabuse	2002		Professional basketball player playing in Japan for the Link Tochigi Brex in the JBL; first Japanese born player to play in the NBA	
Asi Taulava	1998	S	Professional basketball player playing in the Philippines for the Coca-Cola Tigers in the PBA	
Mike Wilton	1972	B.S.	Volleyball head coach for the University of Hawaii, three-time national coach of the year, 2002 national champion	

== Other ==
Name	Class year(s)	Degree(s)	Notability	Reference
George E. Wahlen			Medal of Honor recipient for heroic efforts in Battle of Iwo Jima	

== See also ==
- Category:Brigham Young University–Hawaii alumni
