= International Journal of Mormon Studies =

- Discipline: Mormon studies
- Language: English
- Edited by: David M. Morris

Publication details
- History: 2008-present
- Publisher: European Mormon Studies Association (United Kingdom)
- Open access: Yes

Standard abbreviations
- ISO 4: Int. J. Mormon Stud.

Indexing
- ISSN: 1757-5532 (print); 1757-5540 (web)
- OCLC no.: 456193972

Links
- Journal homepage; Online archive

The International Journal of Mormon Studies was a peer-reviewed open access academic journal of Mormon studies, that was established in 2008 as the British Journal of Mormon Studies, before obtaining its current title later in 2009. Its 2008 volume was renamed retroactively. It was published in Staffordshire, England by the European Mormon Studies Association. Its general editor between 2008 and 2018 was David M. Morris.

The European Mormon Studies Association also sponsored academic conferences throughout Europe (such as one in 2013, in association with Brigham Young University London Centre. The journal has been retired and archived.

Its introduction stated:

"The International Journal of Mormon Studies is a European based internationally focused, peer-reviewed online and printed scholarly journal, which is committed to the promotion of interdisciplinary scholarship by publishing articles and reviews of current work in the field of Mormon studies. With high quality international contributors, the journal explores Mormon studies and its related subjects. In addition, IJMS provides those who submit manuscripts for publication with useful, timely feedback by making the review process constructive."

Many of the articles came from leading scholars of Mormonism both within and without the church and from different academic disciplines.

The IJMS issues remain available online via archive.org (https://web.archive.org/web/20190212152123/https://www.ijmsonline.org/authors-a-z).

== See also ==
- List of Latter Day Saint periodicals
