= Philip Barlow =

American academic (born 1950)

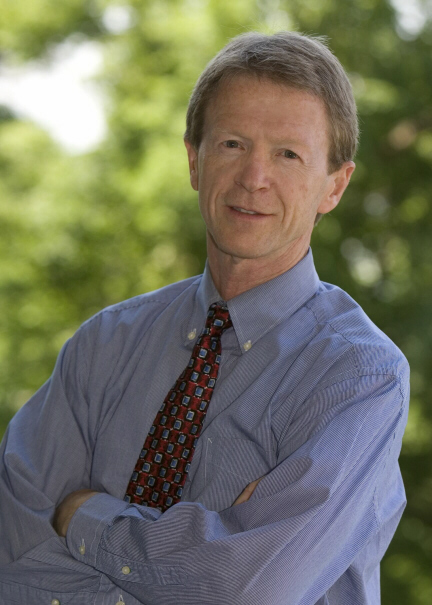
Philip Barlow

Philip Layton Barlow (born 1950) is a Harvard-trained scholar who specializes in American religious history, religious geography, and Mormonism. In 2019, Barlow was appointed associate director of the Neal A. Maxwell Institute for Religious Scholarship (Maxwell Institute). Barlow was the first full-time professor of Mormon studies at a secular university as the inaugural Leonard J. Arrington Chair of Mormon History and Culture at Utah State University (USU), from 2007 to 2018.

== Biography ==
Barlow was raised in Bountiful, Utah. He is a member of The Church of Jesus Christ of Latter-day Saints (LDS Church). In 1975, he graduated with a bachelor's degree in history from Weber State College. In 1980 and 1988, respectively, he received a master's degree in theological studies and a doctorate of theology (Th.D.) from the Harvard Divinity School. While in the Boston area, Barlow taught at the LDS Church's local Institute of Religion. He also served as a counselor in a bishopric to Mitt Romney.

In 2017, Barlow held the first fellowship at the Maxwell Institute at Brigham Young University.

== The Arrington Chair of Mormon History and Culture ==
The establishment in 2007 of the Arrington Chair at USU was one prominent symbol of a new era for the study of the Mormon faith in secular higher education. It was part of the new religious studies program at the university, the first program in Utah enabling students to major in religion. Since the establishment of the Arrington Chair, Richard Bushman was inaugurated as the Howard W. Hunter Chair of Mormon Studies at Claremont Graduate University of Religion, which was followed by the 2012 creation of the Richard Lyman Bushman chair of Mormon Studies at University of Virginia.

== Publications ==
As Author:

- New Historical Atlas of Religion in America. Oxford University Press, 2001. (Co-authored with Edwin Scott Gaustad)
- Mormons and the Bible: The Place of the Latter-day Saints in American Religion. Oxford University Press, 1991.

As Editor:

- Religion and Public Life in the Midwest: America’s Common Denominator? Alta Mira Press, 2004. (co-edited with Mark Silk)
- A Thoughtful Faith: Essays on Belief by Mormon Scholars. Canon Press, 1986.
- The Oxford Handbook of Mormonism. Oxford University Press, 2015, ISBN 978-0-1904-6350-2. (co-edited with Terryl L. Givens)
