= Birth control and abortion (LDS Church) =

Birth control and the LDS Church

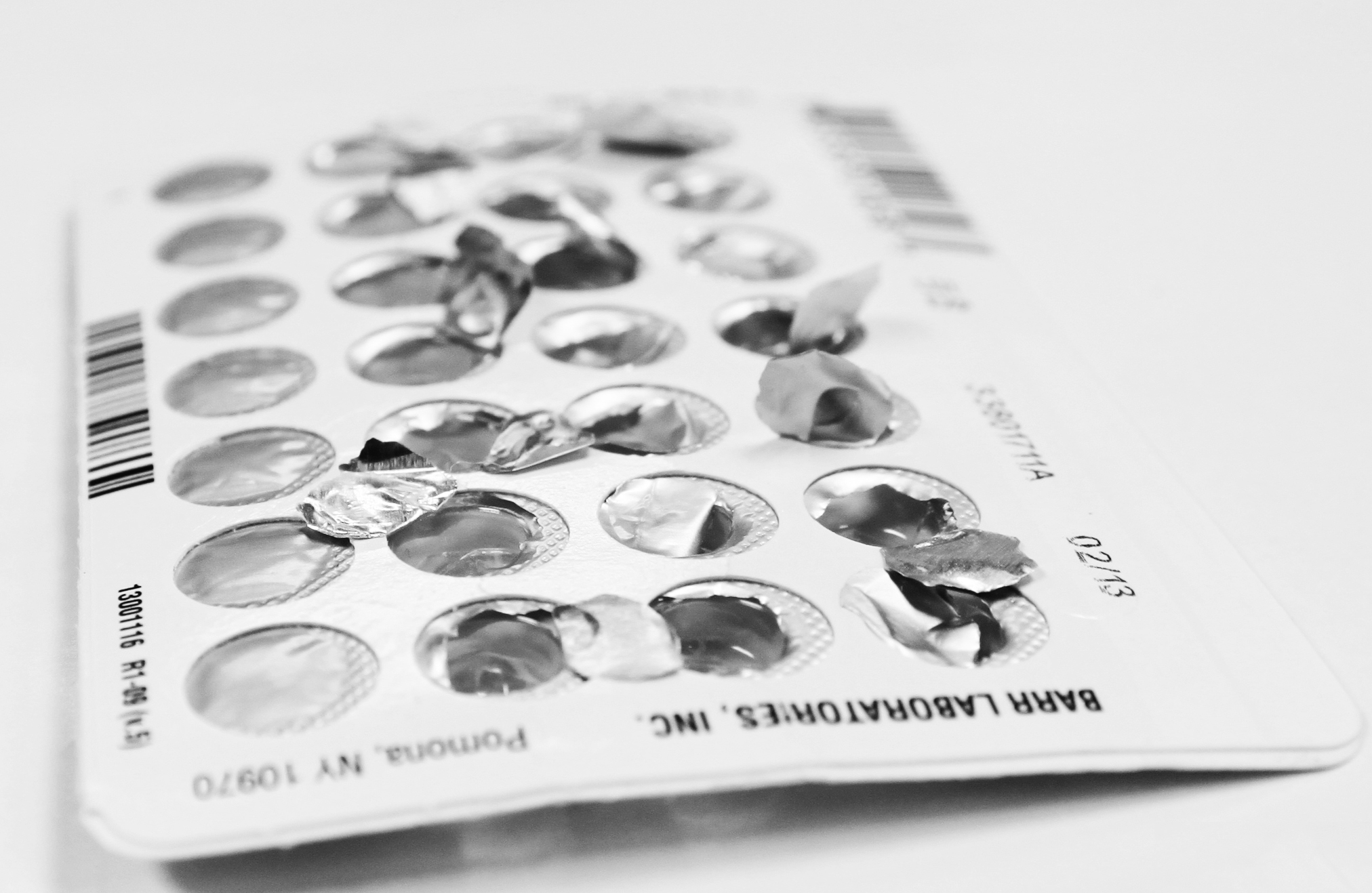
A package of birth control pills.

Views on birth control in the Church of Jesus Christ of Latter-day Saints (LDS Church) have changed from condemning all forms to allowing them over the course of the church's history. Top LDS leaders historically condemned any use of birth control as sinful. They regularly spoke out against birth control into the 1970s, and gradually in the 1980s and 1990s, leaders reduced overt teaching against it. By 1998 official church policy began explicitly allowing for uses of birth control.

As of 2025, the church opposes most elective abortions (excepting cases of rape, incest, and serious health complications to the mother) and discourages surgical sterilization. The church-owned insurance company which insures church employees did not provide coverage for any form of birth control until 2023, and continues to deny coverage for surgical sterilization except in specific circumstances.

== History ==
Leaders of the church have gone from historically condemning the use of any birth control as sinful, to allowing it in the present day. In the past the use of birth control methods including artificial contraception was explicitly condemned by LDS Church leaders. Members were encouraged to have many children by early LDS leaders such as Brigham Young who stated in 1856, "It is the duty of every righteous man and woman to prepare tabernacles for all the spirits they can." Church members have had the highest birth rate of any US religious group.

=== 1900–1949 ===
Beginning in July 1916, apostles were quoted in a church magazine stating that birth control was a "pernicious doctrine" and that "limiting the number of children in a family...is sinful". The same article said God wanted women to exercise their "sacred power of procreation to its utmost limit", and one top leader said his wife had birthed fifteen children and that anything less than that would have fallen short of her duty. The next year in the magazine birth control was deemed an evil "crime of race suicide" and "one of the greatest crimes of the world". Previous statements were given an official endorsement by the highest governing body of the church, the First Presidency.

The first time that any approval of a non-abstinence fertility control method was publicly expressed occurred in a 1942 church magazine article in which apostle John A. Widtsoe mentioned the rhythm method as an acceptable means of spacing children.

=== 1950–1999 ===
LDS leaders regularly spoke out against birth control into the 1970s, and gradually in the 1980s and 1990s, leaders stopped overtly teaching against it. In his influential 1956 treatise Doctrines of Salvation, then apostle Joseph Fielding Smith, who became a church president, called birth control a wickedness that leads to damnation and caused the downfall of nations. He further stated that a Latter-day Saint couple that deliberately prevents themselves from having more children after their second or third child is guilty of iniquity which must be punished. The 1958 edition of Bruce R. McConkie's popular book Mormon Doctrine stated that all those using condoms or other artificial contraception are "in rebellion against God and are guilty of gross wickedness."

The Church Educational System Honor Code in 1968 stated that "the Church does not approve of any form of birth control." In 1969, the First Presidency reemphasized it was "contrary to the teachings of the Church artificially to curtail or prevent the birth of children", though, for the first time there was a clarification that men should be considerate to "conserve" the "health and strength" of their wives when planning families since they carry the "greater responsibility" for bearing and rearing children. Other discussions of the topic include those by Ezra Taft Benson, who also became a church president. He stated that those that advocate for birth control perpetuate types of government that cause famine. In 1987 he taught that couples should not prevent births for selfish reasons, and that a sterilization operation could "jeapordiz[e] your exaltation."

By 1990 birth control was still considered forbidden by church leaders. In 1995 the Family Proclamation was released by top leaders as a near-scripture directive on family, and many adherents interpret part of it as of 2023 as encouraging them to have as many children as possible. In 1998 an update to the previous 1989 version of the Church Handbook "mark[ed] a significant break" from past teachings on family planning. It explicitly stated the decision of the number children was up to the couple, and no longer encouraged couples to have as many children as possible.

=== 2000–present ===
As recently as 2003, a church manual was published containing a quote from the late church president Spencer W. Kimball stating that the church does not "condone nor approve of" measures of contraception which greatly "limit the family". Historically, the church discouraged surgical sterilization, like vasectomies and tubal ligation, and encouraged members to only use these options for serious medical conditions after discussing it with a bishop.

== Current views ==
=== General birth control ===
As of 2023, the church stance is that when planning for their family, a couple's decisions regarding birth control is ultimately up to them. The church maintains that it is a responsibility and privilege for couples who can to have children. Couples are encouraged to prayerfully consider issues such as mental well-being and financial capabilities for supporting children.

=== Surgical sterilization ===
Present church policy regarding surgeries such as vasectomies and tubal ligation is, like with general birth control, ultimately the decision of the affected couple. However, the church does still express discouragement towards such methods, and entreats individuals to pray about such decisions before going through with surgical methods of birth control. In the church's General Handbook, it is acknowledged that such surgeries are sometimes medically necessary for reasons unrelated to birth control. In 2020, the church's General Handbook was modified and language regarding surgical sterilization softened from "strongly discourages" to state it was discouraged.

=== Abortion ===
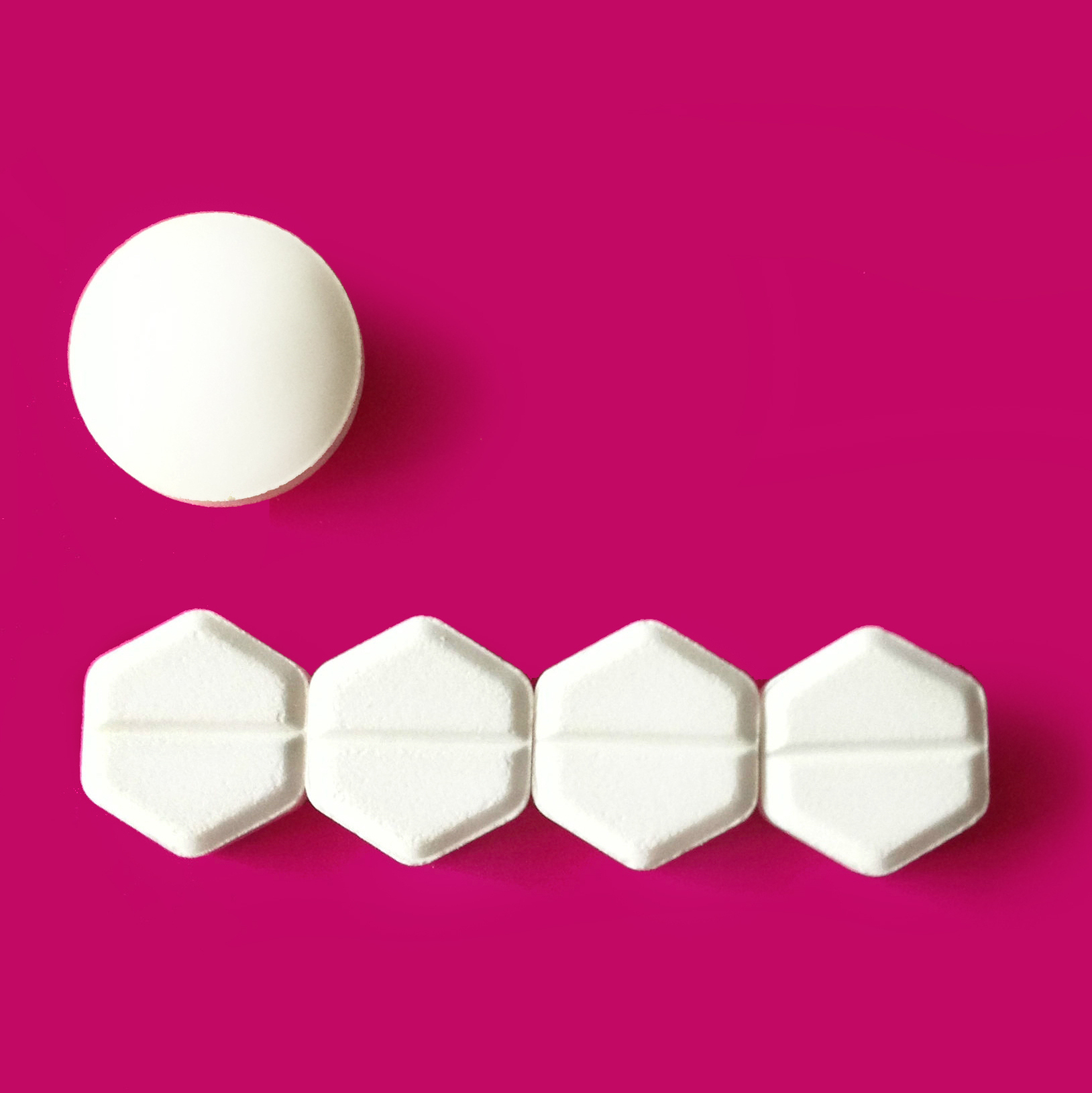
Shown here is the typical pharmaceutical abortifacient regimen for early medical abortions (200 mg mifepristone and 800 μg misoprostol).

The LDS Church opposes elective abortions "for personal or social convenience". It also states that abortions are acceptable in cases of rape, incest, danger to the health or life of the mother, or where the fetus will not survive beyond birth. In a 2011 US-wide Pew poll, of the 600 LDS-identifying respondents, 27% said abortion should be legal in all or most cases, and 70% said it should be illegal in all or most cases. The church has no official position on when life begins (i.e. when it believes the spirit enters the body), but does state that ordinances such as naming and blessing children and sealing them to their parents are not needed for stillborn or miscarried children.

As of 2019 baptismal candidates who confess during a baptismal interview to having had or encouraging an abortion require special clearance from a full-time mission president before baptism. In the 1800s top leaders Brigham Young and Erastus Snow both denounced abortion. In the early 1900s Joseph Fielding Smith called it murder.

== Church insurance and birth control ==
Before 2023 the church's insurance company, Deseret Mutual Benefits Administrators, which provides coverage for its employees, did not cover any form of birth control. In 2023, the church company began covering many types of birth control except emergency contraception (i.e. the-morning-after pill). However, it still does not cover any sterilization (whether by vasectomy or tubal ligation) for a couple unless the woman has already had five children or is over forty.
