= All Dead Mormons Are Now Gay =

American satirical website

All Dead Mormons Are Now Gay (ADMANG) is a satirical website which states that it turns deceased members of the Church of Jesus Christ of Latter-day Saints (informally called LDS or Mormons) gay in the afterlife.

== Purpose ==
The ADMANG site is meant to mock the practice in Mormonism of baptism for the dead for unwilling people, especially that of Jewish and LGBT Holocaust victims, a practice which has been widely seen as antisemitic, homophobic, and overall offensive. (Note: A note on the ADMANG website states "Holocaust victims are not eligible for conversion.") The site allows one to insert the name of "their favorite dead Mormon" into a slide and click the "Convert!" button to "baptize" the person into "the joys of homosexuality". There is also a "Choose-a-Mormon" option if the user does not have a specific Mormon in mind. The website warns that there is no way to undo this act. The LDS Church is largely perceived as being anti-gay in US polls, condemns all same-sex sexual activity as sinful, and was instrumental in defeating the legalization of same-sex marriage in six US states. The church also taught for decades that any adherents attracted to the same sex could and should convert those attractions through sexual orientation change efforts and righteous striving, and provided therapy and programs for attempts to change sexual orientation.

== Reception ==
Within a few days ADMANG garnered 17,000 likes on Facebook but drew the ire of many members of the LDS Church and some from the Christian right due to their belief that it was blasphemous. Jay Michaelson of Religion Dispatches named the site his favorite of 2012. Jack Werner of Sveriges Radio called the news of the site "perhaps the oddest news story" of February 2012.

== See also ==
- Shoah
- Persecution of homosexuals in Nazi Germany
- Homosexuality and the LDS Church
- LGBT rights and the LDS Church
- Sexual orientation change efforts and the LDS Church
- LGBTQ Mormon suicides
- Criticism of the LDS Church
