= Curses of Cain and Ham (LDS Church) =

Black people and LDS teachings

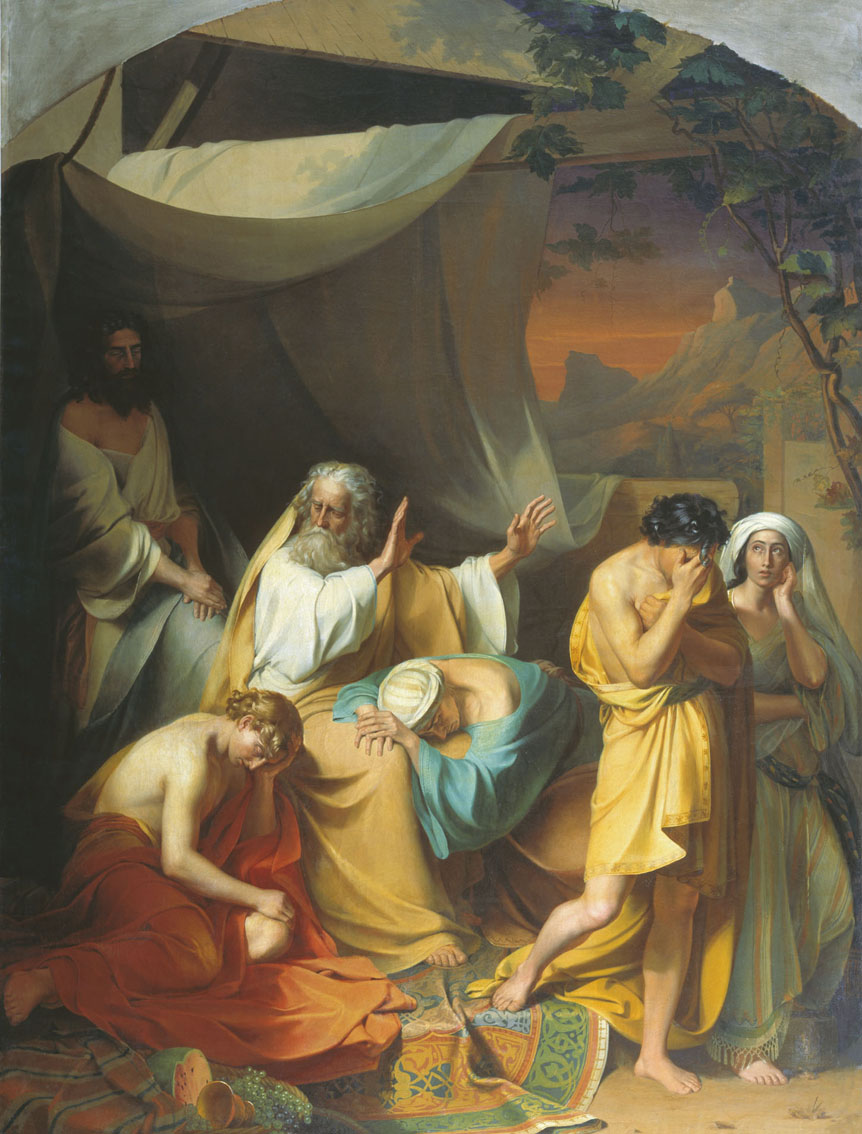
This painting shows Noah cursing Ham. Smith and Young both taught that Black people were under the curse of Ham, and the curse of Cain.

Teachings on the biblical curse of Cain and the curse of Ham in the Church of Jesus Christ of Latter-day Saints, and their effects on Black people in the LDS Church have changed throughout the church's history. Both church founder Joseph Smith, and his successor Brigham Young taught that Black people were under the curse of Ham, and the curse of Cain. Smith and Young both referred to the curses as a cause for slavery. They also taught that dark skin marked people of African ancestry as cursed by God. In Smith's revisions of the King James Bible, and production of the Book of Abraham he traced their cursed state back to the curses placed on Cain and Ham, and linked the two curses by positioning Ham's Canaanite posterity as matrilinear descendants of Cain.

Prior to the Latter Day Saint settlement in Missouri, Smith, like many other Northerners, was opposed to slavery, but softened his opposition to slavery during the Missouri years, going as far as writing a very cautious justification of the institution. Following the Mormon Extermination Order and violent expulsion of the church from the slave state, Smith openly embraced abolitionism and preached the equality of all of God's children, in 1841 stating that if the opportunity for Black people were equal to the opportunity provided to White people, that Black people could perform as well or better than them.

Young, while seemingly open to Black men holding the priesthood under Smith's leadership and praising of Black members of the church, later as Smith's successor used the curse as justification of barring Black people from the priesthood, banning interracial marriages, and opposing Black suffrage. He stated that the curse would one day be lifted and that Black people would be able to receive the priesthood post-mortally.

== In LDS Scripture ==
According to the Bible, after Cain killed Abel, God cursed him and put a mark on him. In another biblical account, Ham discovered his father Noah drunk and naked in his tent. Because of this, Noah cursed Ham's son, Canaan to be "servants of servants". Although the scriptures do not mention Ham's skin color, some doctrines associated the curse with Black people and used it to justify slavery.

Starting in 1831, Smith said he translated parts of the Old Testament, and those parts have been interpreted to mean that Black people were the descendants of Cain and Ham. In his translation Smith wrote "Canaan shall be his servant and a veil of darkness shall cover him that he shall be known among all men." He also wrote "there was a blackness come upon all the children of Canaan", and "the seed of Cain were black, and had not place among them." However, the term "black" at that time did not refer solely to skin color; the adjective was also defined by Noah Webster as "sullen; having a cloudy look or countenance [...] atrociously wicked; horrible [...] dismal; mournful; calamitous," which descriptions go hand-in-hand with the consequences of Cain having murdered Abel. The Pearl of Great Price, another LDS book of scripture, describes a blackness settling upon the children of Canaan; many critics take this as a reference to descendants of Cain, but the Church's doctrine does not make any claims about the Canaanites being Cain's descendants. Church president Brigham Young stated, "What is the mark? You will see it on the countenance of every African you ever did see....", and "the Lord put a mark upon [Cain], which is the flat nose and black skin".

== Teachings in the late 1800s ==
John Taylor taught on multiple occasions that the reason that a descendant of Cain was allowed to survive the flood so that the devil could be properly represented on the earth. The next president, Wilford Woodruff also affirmed that millions of people have Cain's mark of blackness drawing a parallel to modern Native Americans' "curse of redness".

== Teachings in the 1900s ==
In a 1908 Liahona article for missionaries, an anonymous but church-sanctioned author reviewed the scriptures about Blackness in the Pearl of Great Price. The author stated that Ham married a descendant of Cain. Therefore Canaan received two curses, one from Noah, and one from being a descendant of Cain. The article states that Canaan was the "sole ancestor of the Negro race" and explicitly linked his curse to be "servant of servants" to Black priesthood denial. To support this idea, the article also discussed how Pharaoh, a descendant of Canaan according to LDS scripture, could not have the priesthood, because Noah "cursed him as pertaining to the Priesthood".

In 1931, apostle Joseph Fielding Smith wrote on the same topic in The Way to Perfection: Short Discourses on Gospel Themes. For evidence that modern Black people were descended from Cain, Smith wrote that "it is generally believed that" Cain's curse was continued through his descendants and through Ham's wife. Smith states that "some of the brethren who were associated with the Prophet Joseph Smith have declared that he taught this doctrine." Smith also includes statements by Brigham Young summarizing the curse and indicating that it would in the future be lifted.

== After the temple and priesthood restrictions removed ==
In 1978, when the church ended the ban on the priesthood, apostle Bruce R. McConkie taught that the ancient curse of Cain and Ham was no longer in effect. General authorities in the LDS Church favored Smith's explanation until 2013, when a Church-published online essay disavowed the idea that Black skin is the sign of a curse. The Old Testament Student Manual, which is published by the church and is the manual currently used to teach the Old Testament in LDS institutes, teaches that Canaan could not hold the priesthood because of the cursing of Ham his father, but makes no reference to race.

== Antediluvian people of Canaan ==
According to the Book of Moses, the people of Canaan were a group of people that lived during the time of Enoch, before the Canaanites mentioned in the Bible. Enoch prophesied that the people of Canaan would war against the people of Shum, and that God would curse their land with heat, and that a blackness would come upon them. When Enoch called the people to repentance and established Zion, he taught everyone except the people of Canaan. The Book of Abraham identifies Pharaoh as a Canaanite. There is no explicit connection from the antediluvian people of Canaan to Cain's descendants, the Canaanites descended from Ham's son Canaan or modern Black people. However, the Book of Moses identifies both Cain's descendants and the people of Canaan as black and cursed, and they were frequently used interchangeably. Bruce R. McConkie justified restrictions on teaching Black people because Enoch did not teach the people of Canaan.

== Reported sightings of Cain by LDS members ==
According to the apostle Joseph Fielding Smith, Cain was cursed to roam the earth without dying. In 1835 church apostle David W. Patten said he saw the cursed Cain covered in hair with dark skin. Abraham O. Smoot reported the sighting as fact to Joseph F. Smith in a letter. The apostle Abraham H. Cannon also accepted the accounting as fact, and prominent member Eliza R. Snow penned a poem in 1884 about the encounter. Then apostle and later church president Spencer W. Kimball retold the account as factual in his popular 1969 book The Miracle of Forgiveness. Joseph F. Smith's son E. Wesley Smith, then a mission president, reported seeing a "monstrous tall dark figure covered with black hair" in 1921, whom his apostle brother Joseph Fielding Smith confirmed was also Cain. Additional sightings were reported in South Weber, Utah in 1980, and Cain being the same as Bigfoot became a part of Mormon folklore with various other reported sightings.

== See also ==
- Black people and Mormonism
- Joseph Smith's views on Black people
- Mormonism and slavery
- Racial segregation of churches in the United States
- Proslavery
