= James McLachlan (scholar) =

American Mormon studies scholar and theologian

- Education: Brigham Young University (philosophy and history); Indiana University Bloomington (M.A., European history); University of Toronto (Ph.D., Religious Studies)
- Occupation: Theology professor
- Known for: Religious studies journal editor
- Spouse: Carrie McLachlan
- Awards: 2007 R. L. "Buzz" Capener Memorial Contest in Comparative Religious Studies, First Place

James McLachlan is a scholar and theologian specializing in Mormon studies. In 2005, he became the inaugural co-editor, of Element: a Journal of Mormon Philosophy and Theology, alongside Carrie McLachlan. It is the flagship peer-reviewed journal of Mormon theology. McLachlan is also a Professor of Philosophy and Religion at Western Carolina University. As of 2011, McLachlan co-chaired the American Academy of Religion’s Mormon Studies Group and was a board member of the Society for Mormon Philosophy and Theology.
