= For the Strength of Youth =

For the Strength of Youth has several meanings within the Church of Jesus Christ of Latter-day Saints:

- For the Strength of Youth (conference), conferences for the youth of the church.
- For the Strength of Youth (magazine), a magazine for youth of the church.
- "For the Strength of Youth" (pamphlet), a pamphlet given to youth of the church setting out the standards of the church.
