= Soaking (sexual practice) =

Mormon premarital sex avoidance method

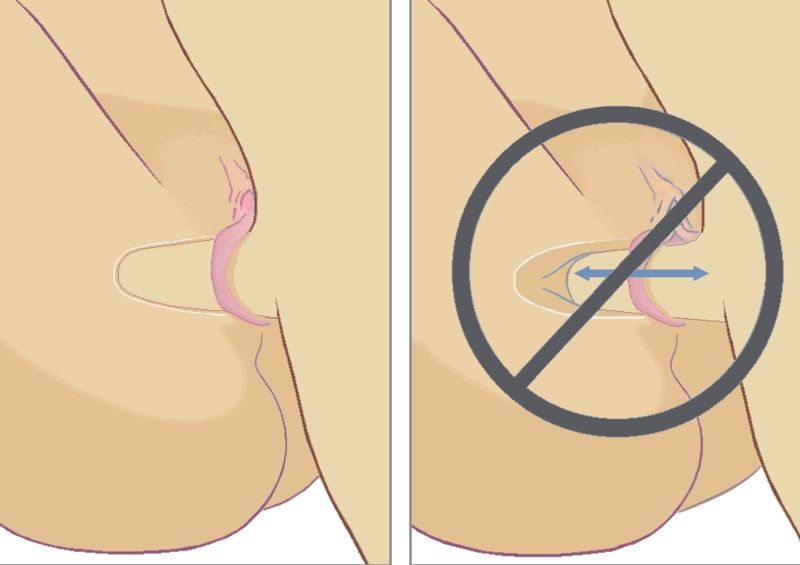
Illustration of soaking or the act of vaginal penetration without subsequent thrusting

Soaking is a sexual practice of inserting the penis into the vagina but not subsequently thrusting or ejaculating (without the help of a third person). It is said to be used by some Mormons, also known as members of the Church of Jesus Christ of Latter-day Saints (LDS Church). Soaking is reportedly used as a loophole to the LDS Church's strict rules against premarital sex. LDS Church leaders do not support this view, instead teaching that "it is wrong to touch the private [...] parts of another person's body" outside of marriage. There are no published scholarly surveys or research around the prevalence of the practice. Some Latter-day Saints have said that soaking is only an urban legend, while others have given firsthand accounts of having practiced it themselves.

== Background ==
Sexual activity before and outside of a monogamous, heterosexual marriage is strictly forbidden by Mormon teachings. This includes solo masturbation. These teachings around sexuality began with Mormonism's founder Joseph Smith, and are outlined in part in The Book of Mormon. A 2002 US survey found LDS teens had the highest rates of any religious group that reported their parents would be "extremely mad" if they had premarital sex (78%). Despite the prohibition, a study by LDS church university sociologists published in 1992 found that nearly 60% of 1,000 Mormon teen women surveyed reported having had sex before marriage, and a smaller survey of 158 married Mormon women in 1995 found that 32% reported having premarital sex.

Postings on TikTok and other social media sites have stated that soaking serves as a loophole to the LDS Church's sexual code of conduct, called the law of chastity. This code of sexual conduct taught by top LDS leaders says that all sexual activity outside of a heterosexual marriage is a sin. The term soaking comes from the idea that vaginal lubrication is "soaking" the penis.

Top LDS Church leaders do not believe soaking is a loophole to the church's code of sexual conduct, as they teach that "it is wrong to touch the private [...] parts of another person's body even if clothed" outside of a monogamous heterosexual marriage. At church-run schools like Brigham Young University, students who confess to or are reported for having pre- or extra-marital sexual contact can be expelled because of the universities' codes of conduct.

== Prevalence ==
There is no published scholarly surveys or research around the prevalence of the practice. Some Latter-day Saints have said that soaking is only an urban legend, while others report knowing church members who had soaked, or give firsthand accounts of trying the practice with a partner before marriage while a member of the LDS Church. One church member stated it was difficult to know how common soaking was among Mormon youth due to the secrecy and shame around sex in the LDS Church, and underreporting due to the social-desirability bias is a common issue even among anonymous surveys of many stigmatized sexual behaviors.

== In popular culture ==
In 2021, a video about soaking went viral on TikTok, and since then the topic has an estimated 69 million posts and 243 million mentions on the platform as of 2024. It has been used as a plot point in sitcoms in the early 2020s, such as the television series Alpha House, Get Shorty, and Jury Duty. The Real Housewives of Salt Lake City cast member Heather Gay reported having soaked as an LDS Church member, but did not believe jump humping (inviting a third person to generate bed motion for the soakers) was an actual practice. It was also referenced in the book Up Up, Down Down, in a Barstool Sports video segment by Adam Ferrone (Rone), a Make Some Noise improv sketch, and in at least one short film of Mormon pornography. Comedian Chelsea Handler explained the practice in an interview on The Late Late Show with James Corden. A hot tub company's Utah billboard that said "we love soaking too" was reported to have been removed after six days due to its controversial nature. Comedian Shane Gillis referenced the practice by Mormons in a Saturday Night Live sketch.

== Reactions ==
Two satirical social media accounts, the BYU Virginity Club and the BYU Slut Club, have both disavowed the practice. Articles have stated that soaking does not prevent the spread of sexually transmitted infection and may still result in pregnancy. One interviewee stated it was "a dangerous form of misinformation being used to manipulate naive girls in college dorms."

== Related terms ==
Terms related to soaking include jump humping, provo pushing, durfing, and the poophole loophole:

- Jump humping – Soaking is said to be sometimes accompanied by "jump humping", in which a third person is invited to bounce on the bed (or to push up on the mattress from below) for a couple engaged in soaking, thus generating motion for them (according to TikTokers ExmoLex and FuneralPotatoSlut, and a BYU student interviewee on Barstool Sports). The external source of motion allegedly absolves the soaking couple from responsibility for any genital movement.
- Provo pushing – The "jump hump" assistant has been termed the "bed jumper" or "Provo pusher" (after Provo, Utah, home of BYU). Other definitions of "provo push" refer to it as clothed or unclothed, non-penetrative dry humping or sexual frottage between Mormons.
- Durfing – Dry humping between church members is also called "durfing".

== Historical citing of the practice ==
In 1885, one of the LDS Church's top leaders, 73-year-old apostle Albert Carrington, argued during the hearings before his excommunication that his decade of extramarital sexual relationships with multiple younger women did not count as adultery (a violation of the church's law of chastity) and was just a "little folly" because he pulled out before ejaculation. Then First Presidency did not agree with him and excommunicated him from the church for his "crimes of lewd and lascivious conduct and adultery."

== See also ==
- Coitus reservatus
- Saddlebacking
- Technical virgin
