= LDS Church members in 20th-century warfare =

Members of The Church of Jesus Christ of Latter-day Saints (LDS Church) have participated in wars throughout the twentieth century, including World Wars I and II. LDS members are encouraged to be active participants in their community, and the church has supported its members serving in the armed forces, both in the United States and in other countries around the world.

== World War I ==
Participation Latter-day Saints in World War I can be shown by direct member involvement and the effects that the war had on the church as a whole.

=== Member involvement ===
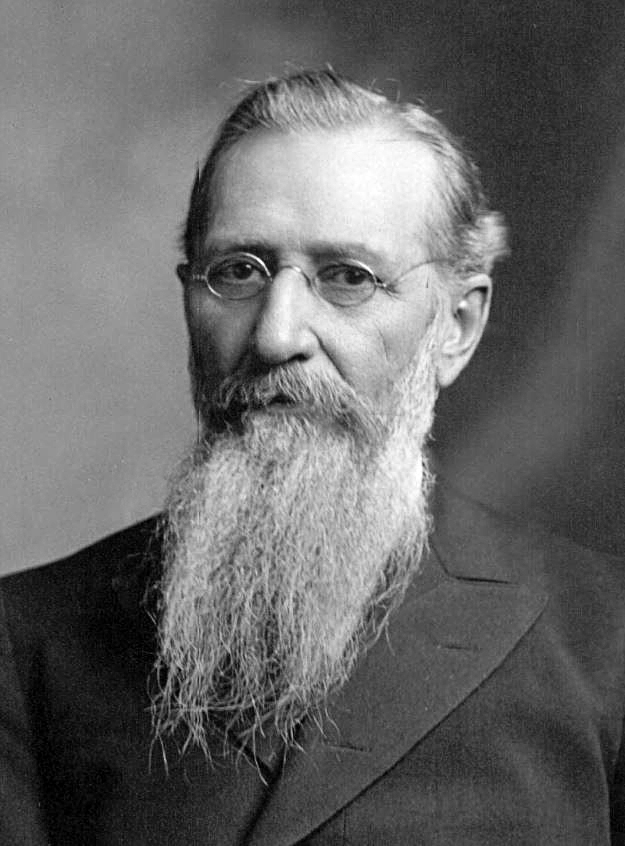
Joseph F. Smith was the president of the Church of Jesus Christ of Latter-day Saints during World War I

Joseph F. Smith was the president of the LDS Church during the time of World War 1. Even though he was an advocate for peace, when the United States entered WWI by declaring war on Germany, Smith supported the cause. He supported patriotism and responsibility, and pertaining to the two he once said, "a good Latter-Day Saint is a good citizen in every way." Smith showed this support by providing Latter-day Saint chaplains for active duty military units. This was the first time that the United States Military allowed the LDS Church to directly select active duty member chaplains, and they have continued to allow this practice to the present day. The first three LDS chaplains selected by the church were Calvin Schwartz Smith, Herbert B. Maw, and B. H. Roberts. Even though there were only three chaplains for the 15,000 LDS members in the war, these men labored diligently to contribute to the war effort by religiously strengthening the LDS soldiers.

Members of the LDS Church also contributed to the war on the homefront. Latter-day Saints along with the rest of the Americans were encouraged by national and local leaders to live more frugally during the war. The United States war effort required a lot of food and supplies for its soldiers, which caused shortages in supplies among Americans. Local LDS leaders began teaching a more thrifty way of living, which taught LDS members how to have what they needed even with the decrease in resources. Latter-Day Saints also practiced controlled conservation of their food and resources in order to contribute to the needs of the U.S. military. Members encouraged food production, used less fuel, purchased war bonds, and contributed supplies to show support for the war and their soldiers.

=== Effects on the Church ===
Joseph F. Smith and other church members had many concerns about the entrance of the United States into the war. Smith quickly began organizing the removal of Latter-day Saint missionaries from Europe. He considered evacuation as a necessary step to ensure the safety of the American church missionaries. This was a major set-back in LDS missionary work as LDS missionaries could no longer proselytize in European countries, but the war provided a new way for members to share their beliefs. Within the ranks of the U.S. forces, church members were able to tell fellow soldiers about their religion as well show them that Latter-day Saints did have feelings of national loyalty, as many Americans believed the LDS Church to be against nationalism.

Many LDS soldiers were killed in the conflict overseas, and were greatly mourned along with the other lost American lives. Also causing large casualties during this time was the influenza epidemic in Europe. WWI soldiers lived in close quarters, where germs were rapidly spread. The influenza disease was underestimated at first, but caused the death of hundreds of soldiers on all sides of the war, LDS soldiers included. Throughout World War I, approximately 700 Latter-day Saint soldiers lost their lives from either warfare or disease.

== World War II ==
Involvement of this community during World War II can be categorized in two ways: Church involvement as a whole, and the involvement of individual members. Effects on the church are generally much more broad, but individual members participated in the war effort in their own ways.

=== Member involvement ===
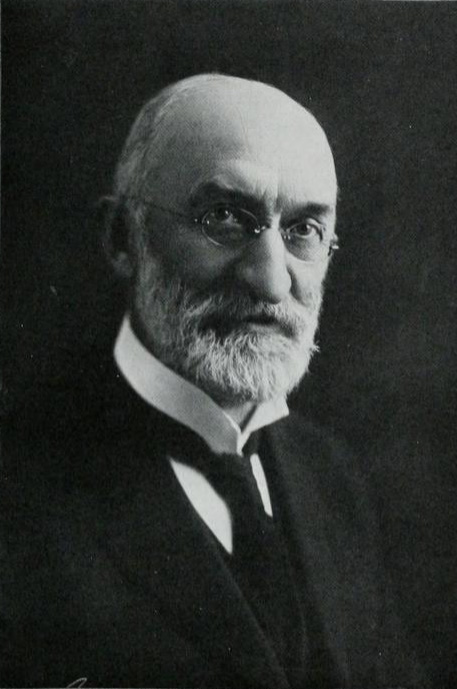
Heber J. Grant was the president of the Church of Jesus Christ of Latter-day Saints during World War II

Many members of the church served during World War II as members of the armed forces, and 45 different members served as chaplains during World War II. Many of them received awards for their service and acts during the war, including two who received Silver Stars, four who received Bronze Stars, and one who was awarded a Purple Heart.

Members in countries other than the United States also participated in this conflict in vastly different ways. A particularly noteworthy example is that of Helmuth Hübener, a German youth who opposed the Nazi Regime by writing and distributing pamphlets with anti–National Socialist material. He was later arrested and executed. Other German members of the church were drafted into the army, and some enlisted of their own accord. Many German church members also said that the years of the war were very difficult, but they also said that many of the hardships they experienced strengthened their faith.

=== Effects on the Church ===
Members of the LDS Church believe that they have the "duty to preach the gospel" (or in other words, share their beliefs) to the world. As a result of this belief, many members choose to serve full time proselytizing missions in certain areas assigned to them by leaders of the church. As tensions rose in Europe before the start of World War II the United States issued a warning to all citizens living abroad, especially in Germany, to leave Europe for their own protection. This directly affected missionaries for the church as most of them originated from within the States. On August 24, 1939, the church removed any missionaries that were in Europe in order to preserve their safety. In August of the following year, missionaries were evacuated from South-African and Pacific areas and later South America.

As conflict increased and the US officially entered the war, the church made official statements encouraging its members to serve their country in the armed forces.
