= Timeline of teachings on evolution in the LDS Church =

Evolution has been publicly discussed since the late 1800s by top leaders in the Church of Jesus Christ of Latter-day Saints (LDS church)—Mormonism's largest denomination. The church currently takes no official position on whether or not biological evolution has occurred, nor on the validity of the modern evolutionary synthesis as a scientific theory. In the twentieth century, the church's highest governing body, the First Presidency, published doctrinal statements on the origin of man and creation (in 1909, 1910, and 1925). In addition, top leaders of the church have expressed a variety of views on evolution, many of which have affected the beliefs and perceptions of Latter-day Saints.

Since the 1859 release of On the Origin of Species by Charles Darwin there have been a variety of LDS Church publications that address evolution, often with neutral or opposing viewpoints. A 2018 study found that over time, the views of Latter-day Saint university students towards evolution had changed from antagonistic to accepting, which was attributed in part to a reduction in the number of anti-evolution statements from top leaders. Below is a timeline of speeches and publications from LDS church officials on the topic of biological evolution.

== 1800s ==
- 1861 – George Q. Cannon of the Quorum of the Twelve responded to Darwin in stated that revelation is superior to science, but considered the possibility of evolution among animals and plants.
- 1873 – Church president and Brigham Young wrote that he was, "resolutely and uncompromisingly opposed" to "the theories...of Darwin."
- 1892 – Church president John Taylor wrote a book which stated in part, "All living beings exist in the same form as when they first received their impress from the Maker" and humans had not originated "from a chaotic mass of matter, moving or inert".

== 1900s ==
- 1909 – The first official statement from the First Presidency on the issue of evolution was in 1909, the centennial of Darwin's birth and the 50th anniversary of the publication of On the Origin of Species. Church president Joseph F. Smith appointed a committee headed by Orson F. Whitney, a member of Quorum of the Twelve, to prepare an official statement, "basing its belief on divine revelation, ancient and modern, proclaim[ing] man to be the direct and lineal offspring of Deity." In addition, the statement declares human evolution as one of the "theories of men". It states that, "man began life as a human being, in the likeness of our heavenly father". Moreover, it states that although man begins life as a germ or embryo, it does not mean that, "[Adam] began life as anything less than a man, or less than the human germ or embryo that becomes a man". Supported by signatures from the First Presidency, the statement was published in November 1909.

== 1910s ==
- 1910 – edition in the "Priesthood Quorum's Table" section of that periodical, Genesis 2:7 is cited as well as other scriptures from Genesis and the Pearl of Great Price. The article states that it is unclear whether the mortal bodies of man evolved through natural processes, whether Adam and Eve where transplanted to Earth from another place, or whether they were born on Earth in mortality. The article states that those questions are not fully answered in the church's current revelation and scripture. The article cites the answer is attributed to the church's First Presidency.
- 1910 – In response to continual questions from church members regarding evolution, as well as problems preceding the 1911 Brigham Young University modernism controversy, in its 1910 Christmas message, the First Presidency made reference to the church's position on science. It stated that the church is not hostile to science and that "diversity of opinion does not necessitate intolerance of spirit". The message continues by stating that proven science is accepted with joy, but theories, speculation, or anything contrary to revelation or common sense are not accepted.
- 1911 – Soon after the First Presidency's 1909 statement, Joseph F. Smith professed in an editorial that "the Church itself has no philosophy about the modus operandi employed by the Lord in His creation of the world", but that the theory of evolution was "more or less a fallacy."

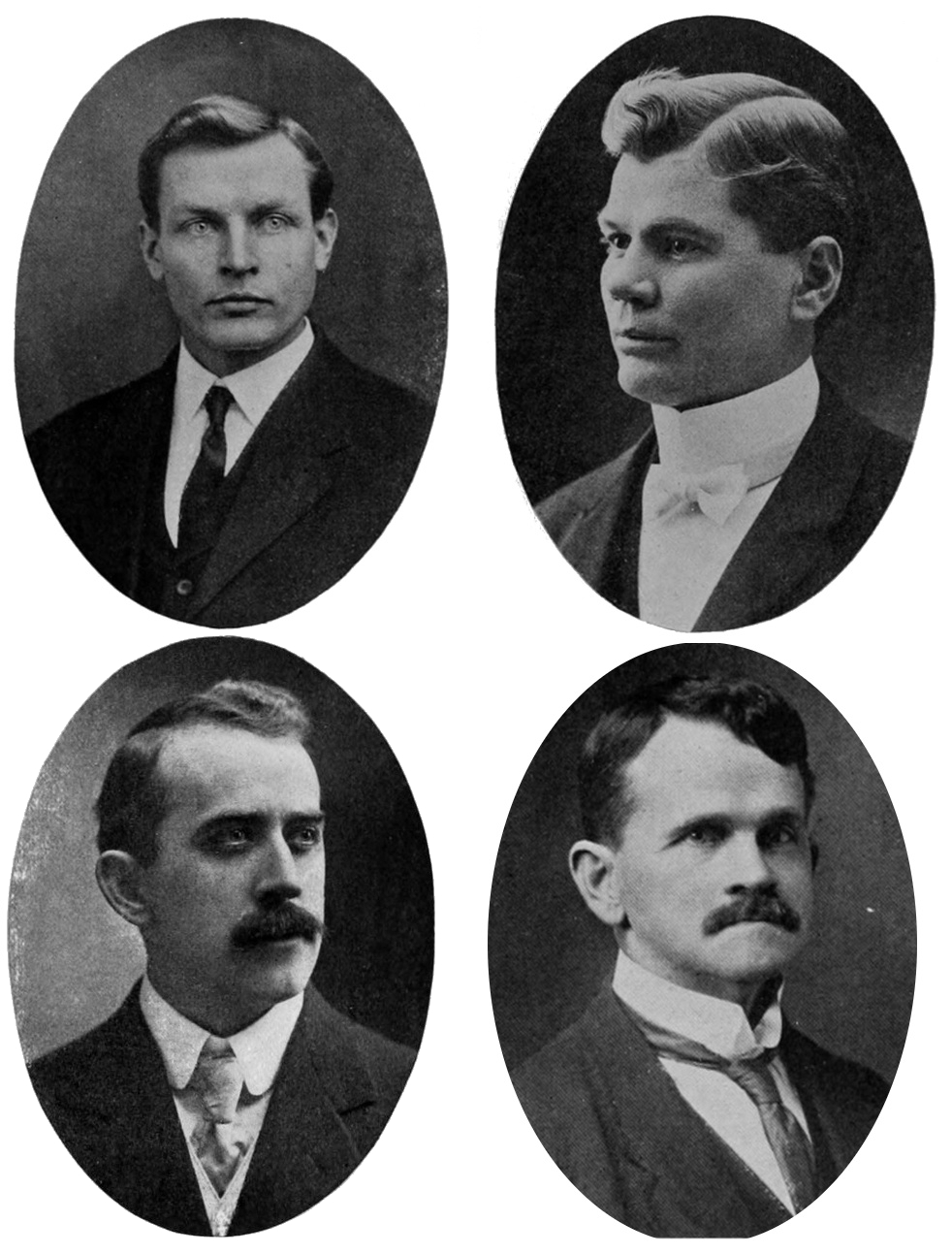
The four professors at the center of the BYU evolution controversy: Joseph and Henry Peterson (top row) and Ralph and W. H. Chamberlin (bottom)

- 1911 – Joseph F. Smith published and signed a statement wherein he explained some of the conflicts between revealed religion and the theories of evolution. He cited the 1911 Brigham Young University modernism controversy, stating that evolution is in conflict with scriptures and modern revelation. He continues that the church holds that "divine revelation" must be the "standard" and is "truth". Smith mentions that "science has changed from age to age", and "philosophic theories of life" have their place, but do not belong in LDS Church school classes and anywhere else when they contradict the word of God.

== 1920s ==
- 1925 – In the midst of the Scopes Trial in Tennessee, a new First Presidency issued an official statement which reaffirmed the doctrine that Adam was the first man upon the earth and that he was created in the image of God. The 1925 statement is shorter than the 1909 statement, containing selected excerpts from the 1909 statement. "Anti-science" language was removed and the title was altered from "The Origin of Man" to "Mormon View of Evolution". The comment which concluded that theories of evolution are "theories of men" in the 1909 official statement was no longer included in the 1925 official statement. The First Presidency has not publicly issued an official statement on evolution since 1925.

== 1930s ==
- 1930 – B. H. Roberts, the presiding member of the First Council of the Seventy, was assigned by the First Presidency to create a study manual for the Melchizedek priesthood holders of the church. Entitled The Truth, The Way, The Life, the draft of the manual that was submitted to the First Presidency and the Quorum of the Twelve Apostles for approval stated that death had been occurring on Earth for millions of years prior to the fall of Adam and that human-like pre-Adamites had lived on the Earth.
- 1930 – Joseph Fielding Smith, a junior member of the Quorum of the Twelve Apostles and the son of a late church president, "vigorously promulgated [the] opposite point of view" in a speech that was published in a church magazine. In his widely read speech, Smith taught as doctrine that there had been no death on earth until after the fall of Adam and that there were no "pre-Adamites".
- 1931 – the First Presidency sent out a lengthy memo to all church general authorities in response to the debate between B. H. Roberts of the Presidency of the Seventy and Joseph Fielding Smith of the Quorum of the Twelve on the existence of pre-Adamites. The memo stated the church's neutral stance on the existence of pre-Adamites.
- 1931 – In general conference, apostle Boyd K. Packer stated that "no one with reverence for God could believe that His children evolved from slime or from reptiles" as well as affirming that "those who accept the theory of evolution don't show much enthusiasm for genealogical research."
- 1931 – both Roberts and Smith were permitted to present their views to the First Presidency and the Quorum of the Twelve. After hearing both sides, the First Presidency issued a memo to the general authorities of the church which stated while they agree with the idea that "Adam is the primal parent of our race", there is no advantage to continuing the discussion and that church members should focus on "[bearing] the message of the restored gospel to the people of the world" and that those sciences do not have anything to do with, "the salvation of the souls of mankind". They stated that continuation of the discussion would only lead to "confusion, division, and misunderstanding if continued further."
- 1931 – Another of the apostles, geologist James E. Talmage, pointed out that Smith's views could be misinterpreted as the church's official position, since Smith's views were widely circulated in a church magazine but Roberts's views were limited to an internal church document. As a result, the First Presidency gave permission to Talmage to give a speech promoting views that were contrary to Smith's. In his speech on August 9, 1931, in the Salt Lake Tabernacle, Talmage taught the same principles that Roberts had originally outlined in his draft manual. Over Smith's objections, the First Presidency authorized a church publication of Talmage's speech in pamphlet form.

== 1940s ==
- 1946 – Roberts wrote that "the theory of evolution as advocated by many modern scientists lies stranded upon the shore of idle speculation. There is one other objection to be urged against the theory of evolution before leaving it; it is contrary to the revelations of God." Roberts further criticized the theories of evolution by stating that Darwin's claims of evolution are contrary to the experience and knowledge of man, because the law of nature requires that every organism reproduces of its own kind, and while variation may occur, changes usually revert due to extinction, chromosomal infertility, or by reversion to original species.

== 1950s ==
- 1952 – In a speech to students at BYU, McKay used the theory of evolution as an example while suggesting that science can "leave [a student] with his soul unanchored." He stated that a professor that denies "divine agency in creation" imposes on the student that life was created by chance. McKay insisted that students should be led to a "counterbalancing thought" that "God is the Creator of the earth", "the Father of our souls and spirits", and "the purpose of creation is theirs (God and Jesus Christ)."
- 1954 – Doctrine and Covenants 77:6 mentions "the seven thousand years of [the earth's] continuance, or its temporal existence", which has been interpreted by Joseph Fielding Smith and Bruce R. McConkie as a statement suggesting that the earth is no more than about six thousand years old (the seventh thousand-year period being the future millennium). "We have evidence beyond dispute that Adam was driven out of the Garden of Eden about 6,000 years ago, or perhaps a short time less. ... In [Doctrine and Covenants] section 77:6–15, we have more information in relation to the opening of these seals [i.e., the seven seals mentioned in the Book of Revelation], with the following significant detail: 'Q. What are we to understand by the book which John saw, which was sealed on the back with seven seals? A. We are to understand that it contains the revealed will, mysteries, and works of God; the hidden things of his economy concerning this earth during the seven thousand years of its continuance, or its temporal existence.'"
- 1954 – when he was President of the Quorum of the Twelve Apostles, Joseph Feilding Smith wrote at length about his personal views on evolution in his book Man, His Origin and Destiny stating that it was a destructive and contaminating influence and that "If the Bible does not kill Evolution, Evolution will kill the Bible." He further stated that "There is not and cannot be, any compromise between the Gospel of Jesus Christ and the theories of evolution" and that "It is not possible for a logical mind to hold both Bible teaching and evolutionary teaching at the same time" since "If you accept [the scriptures] you cannot accept organic evolution."
- 1954 – Smith also produced personal statements on evolution in his Doctrines of Salvation including that "If evolution is true, the church is false" since "If life began on Earth as advocated by Darwin ... then the doctrines of the church are false". Smith stated about his views on evolution, "No Adam, no fall; no fall, no atonement; no atonement, no savior." Smith also asserted that "There was no death of any living creature before the fall of Adam! Adam's mission was to bring to pass the fall and it came upon the earth and living things throughout all nature. Anything contrary to this doctrine is diametrically opposed to the doctrines revealed to the Church! If there was any creature increasing by propagation before the fall, then throw away the Book of Mormon, deny your faith, the Book of Abraham and the revelations in the Doctrine and Covenants! Our scriptures most emphatically tell us that death came through the fall, and has passed upon all creatures including the earth itself. For this earth of ours was pronounced good when the Lord finished it. It became fallen and subject to death as did all things upon its face, through the transgression of Adam."
- 1957 – In response to an inquiry about the book from the head of the University of Utah Geology Department, church president David O. McKay affirmed that "the Church has officially taken no position" on evolution, Smith's book "is not approved by the Church", and that the book is entirely Smith's "views for which he alone is responsible".
- 1958 – In his popular and controversial reference book Mormon Doctrine, McConkie devoted ten pages to his entry on evolution. "There is no harmony between the truths of revealed religion and the theories of organic evolution." The evolution entry in Mormon Doctrine quotes extensively from Smith's Man, His Origin and Destiny. McConkie characterized the intellect of those Latter-day Saints who believe in evolution while simultaneously having knowledge of church doctrines on life and creation as "weak and puerile". McConkie included a disclaimer in Mormon Doctrine stating that he alone was responsible for the doctrinal and scriptural interpretations. The 1958 edition stated that the "official doctrine of the Church" asserted a "falsity of the theory of organic evolution." McConkie also wrote that "there were no pre-Adamites," that Adam was not the "end-product of evolution," and that there "was no death in the world, either for man or for any form of life until after the Fall of Adam."

== 1960s ==
- 1965 – BYU professor of botany Bertrand F. Harrison, working with McKay to "foster greater understanding between Saints with differing viewpoints on evolution," publishes an article in The Instructor depicting a conversation between two fictional church members – a biologist and a farmer – wherein the biologist explains to the farmer why he believes in evolution. The conversation ends with the farmer stating that he still doesn't believe in evolution, but he "understand[s] enough to see that there is a place in the Church for both of us."
- 1965 – Talmage's speech was reprinted again by the church in an official church magazine. As Talmage points out in the article, "The outstanding point of difference ... is the point of time which man in some state has lived on this planet." With regards to evolution in general, Talmage challenged many of its aspects in the same speech. He said that he does not believe Adam descended from cavemen or lower forms of men, but is divinely created. He did, however, state that were it true that Adam evolved from lower form, it only seems likely that men will continue to evolve into something higher as a part of eternal progression. He continued by stating that, "evolution is true so far as it means development, and progress, and advancement in all the works of God", and that the scriptures, "should not be discredited by theories of men; they cannot be discredited by fact and truth." Talmage considered the possibility of pre-Adamites; however, he denied speciation and evolution.
- 1968 – In general conference, McKay's son, David, read a message on his father's behalf that was an edited version of the 1952 speech, including the omission of the word "beautiful" when describing the theory of evolution.

== 1970s ==
- 1975 – In the church women's conference, church president Spencer W. Kimball quoted, "And, I God created man in mine own image, and in the image of mine Only Begotten created I him; male and female created I them." (Kimball added that "the story of the rib, of course, is figurative.") Kimball continued, "we don't know exactly how [Adam and Eve's] coming into this world happened, and when we're able to understand it the Lord will tell us."
- 1979 – A previous article in the New Era also showed youth viewing evolution as an antagonistic idea to their faith and becoming upset when it was taught
- 1979 – In the Bible Dictionary of the LDS Church, the entry for "Fall of Adam" previously included the following statement: "Before the fall, Adam and Eve had physical bodies but no blood. There was no sin, no death, and no children among any of the earthly creations." Under the entry "Flesh", it is written: "Since flesh often means mortality, Adam is spoken of as the 'first flesh' upon the earth, meaning he was the first mortal on the earth, all things being created in a non-mortal condition, and becoming mortal through the fall of Adam.

== 1980s ==
- 1980 – The Old Testament Student Manual, published by the Church Educational System, contains several quotes by general authorities as well as academics from a variety of backgrounds (both members of the church and non-members) related to organic evolution and the origins of the earth.
- 1980 – McConkie wrote that "the greatest heresy in the sectarian world ... is that God is a spirit nothingness which fills the immensity of space, and that creation came through evolutionary processes."
- 1981 – Prior to becoming president of the LDS Church, Ezra Taft Benson gave a general conference address in which he stated that "the theory of man's development from lower forms of life" is a "false idea".
- 1982 – Bruce R. McConkie at BYU that there was no death in the world for Adam or for any form of life before the fall, and that trying to reconcile religion and organic evolution was a false and devilish heresy among church members.
- 1983 – Hinckley stated he, "heard the whole story of Darwinism as it was then taught. I wondered about it. I thought much about it. But I did not let it throw me, for I read what the scriptures said about our origins and our relationship to God." His staments were printed in a church magazine the next year.
- 1984 – McConkie disparaged the "evolutionary fantasies of biologists" and stated that yet to be revealed "doctrines will completely destroy the whole theory of organic evolution" and stated that any religion that assumes humans are a product of evolution cannot offer salvation since true believers know humans were made in a state in which there was no procreation or death.
- 1987 – Russell M. Nelson also stated in a church magazine article that he found the theory of evolution unbelievable.
- 1988 – after becoming president of the church, Benson published a book counseling members of the church to use the Book of Mormon to counter the theories of evolution. He wrote that "we have not been using the Book of Mormon as we should. Our homes are not as strong unless we are using it to bring our children to Christ. Our families may be corrupted by worldly trends and teachings unless we know how to use the book to expose and combat the falsehoods in socialism, organic evolution, rationalism, humanism, etc."
- 1988 – The 1909 and 1925 statements of the First Presidency have been subsequently endorsed by church leaders such as apostle Boyd K. Packer in 1988.
- 1988 – Benson wrote that educational institutions serve to mislead youth, which explains—he noted—why the church advises that youth attend church institutions, allowing parents to closely observe the education of their children and clear up "the deceptions of men like . . . Charles Darwin.

== 1990s ==
- 1992 – These statements generally adopt the position, as a church-approved encyclopedia entry. The entry on evolution in the Encyclopedia of Mormonism was approved by apostles Neal A. Maxwell and Dallin H. Oaks. states, "[t]he scriptures tell why man was created, but they do not tell how, though the Lord has promised that he will tell that when he comes again."
- 1992 – The LDS-owned universities, a packet of authoritative statements approved by the BYU Board of Trustees (composed of the First Presidency, other general authorities, and general organizational leaders) has been provided to students in classes when discussing the topic of organic evolution. The packet was assembled due to the large number of questions students had about evolution and the origins of man and is intended to be distributed along with other course material. The packet includes the first three Official First Presidency statements on the origin of man as well as the "Evolution" section in the Encyclopedia of Mormonism which includes elements from the 1909 and 1925 statements as well as the 1931 "First Presidency Minutes".
- 1992 – The Ensign, an official periodical of the church, published an article entitled "Christ and the Creation" by Bruce R. McConkie, which stated that "[m]ortality and procreation and death all had their beginnings with the Fall."
- 1992 – There is a short article in the Encyclopedia of Mormonism which is largely composed of quotes from the 1909 and 1925 statements. It states that men and women are created in the image of the "universal Father and Mother", and Adam, like Christ was a pre-existing spirit who took a body to become a "living soul". It continues by stating that because man is "endowed with divine attributes", he "is capable, by experience through ages and aeons, of evolving into a God."
- 1993 – church seventy using scientific arguments in an attempt to disprove evolutionary natural selection and adaptation.
- 1996 – Hinckley recalled his university studies of anthropology and geology during an interview stating he "Studied all about it. Didn't worry me then. Doesn't worry me now", insisting that the church only requires the belief that Adam was the first man of "what we would call the human race."
- 1997 – speech at an Institute of Religion in Ogden, Utah, church president Gordon B. Hinckley said: "People ask me every now and again if I believe in evolution. I tell them I am not concerned with organic evolution. I do not worry about it. I passed through that argument long ago."
- 1997 – Hinckley stated "I believe in evolution, not organic evolution, as it is called, but in the evolution of the mind, the heart, and the soul of man."

== 2000s ==
- 2002 – the entire 1909 First Presidency message was reprinted in the church's Ensign magazine.
- 2003 – The Old Testament Student Manual 2003 edition states that there is no official stance on the age of the earth but that evidence for a longer process is substantial and very few people believe the earth was actually created in the space of one week. However, it also includes a quote from Joseph Fielding Smith asserting that organic evolution is incompatible and inconsistent with revelations from God and that to accept it is to reject the plan of salvation.
- 2004 – An anonymously authored article did not attempt to reconcile church teachings and scientific views of evolution, but stated that not having the answers does not discredit the existence of God, and that God will not reveal more unto us until we prove our faith. An example was provided of how the author avoided a classroom debate on evolution by stating that they knew God existed and created us. The article also quoted past church president Gordon B. Hinckley giving his own example of how he chose to drop the question and not let it bother him.
- 2004 – Subsequent letters from youth stated that the youth viewed themselves as against evolution and supportive of intelligent design.
- 2004 – A quote from Hinckley was reprinted in a church magazine.
- 2007 – Russell M. Nelson stated in an interview with the Pew Research Center that "to think that man evolved from one species to another is, to me, incomprehensible. Man has always been man. Dogs have always been dogs. Monkeys have always been monkeys. It's just the way genetics works."

== 2010s ==
- 2012 – apostle Russell M. Nelson discussed the human body stating "some people erroneously think that these marvelous physical attributes happened by chance or resulted from a big bang somewhere". He then compared this to an "explosion in a printing shop produc[ing] a dictionary".
- 2013 – Doctrine and Covenants and Church History Seminary Teacher Manual the manual for seminary teachers states: "It may be helpful to explain that the 7,000 years refers to the time since the Fall of Adam and Eve. It is not referring to the actual age of the earth including the periods of creation."
- 2016 – An article for young adults in the New Era acknowledged questions about how the age of the earth, dinosaurs, and evolution fit with church teachings, stating "it does all fit together, but there are still a lot of questions." The article offered no further explanation to how science and LDS teachings fit together, and stated "nothing that science reveals can disprove your faith" and told youth "not to get worried in the meantime."
- 2016 – the church published an anonymously authored article stating that "the Church has no official position of the theory of evolution." The article continues by stating that the theory of organic evolution should be left for scientific study and that no details about the what happened before Adam and Eve and how their bodies were created have not been revealed, but the origin of man is clear from the teaching of the church.

== 2020s ==
- 2022 – The church published an article overview on the history of church teachings on evolution.

== See also ==
- Mormon views on evolution
