= FAIR (Mormon apologetics organization) =

Organization of apologetics of the Church of Jesus Christ of Latter-day Saints

- Faithful Answers, Informed Response
- Formation: December 19, 1997; 28 years ago
- Headquarters: Redding, CA
- Members: Scott Gordon (President), Gregory Smith (board member), Paul McNabb (board member), Daniel Peterson (board member), John Lynch (board member)
- Revenue: $306,251 (2019)
- Website: https://www.fairlatterdaysaints.org/
- Formerly called: Foundation for Apologetic Information and Research, Inc.; FairMormon

FAIR (Faithful Answers, Informed Response), formerly known as FairMormon and the Foundation for Apologetic Information & Research (FAIR), is a non-profit 501(c)(3) organization that specializes in Mormon apologetics and responds to criticism of the Church of Jesus Christ of Latter-day Saints (LDS Church). FAIR comprises volunteers who seek to answer questions submitted to its web site. It was founded in November 1997 by members of the Church of Jesus Christ of Latter-day Saints who wanted to defend their faith on AOL message boards. The members of FAIR are international volunteers. FAIR holds an annual conference where topics of current apologetic issues are presented. The organization also publishes a monthly electronic newsletter.

FAIR is not officially affiliated with the LDS Church, though its members are "all committed to defending the Church".

== Name ==
At its inception, FAIR was known as the Foundation for Apologetic Information and Research (FAIR). However, because of widespread unfamiliarity with the meaning of apologetics as reasoned argumentation, in August 2013 the organization announced it would change its name from FAIR to FairMormon.

Steven Densley, vice-president at the time, explained:

“We have changed our name and are updating our websites in order to make them more easily accessible. The name has been simplified. Instead of The Foundation for Apologetic Information and Research, it is now simply FairMormon. Hopefully this will be easier to remember and will allow us to spend more time doing apologetics rather than spending our time explaining what apologetics is. Our mission has not changed, but hopefully, with the name change and the changes with the websites, our organization will be more effective."

In February 2021, the organization announced an official rebranding effort, including a new name, website, and logo, in response to requests from church president Russell M. Nelson to avoid using the colloquial term "Mormon" to refer to the church or to Latter-day Saints. The group returned to the name FAIR, though it changed the acronym to stand for "Faithful Answers, Informed Response".

== Websites ==
Mormon Voices is a website run by FAIR which seeks to defend representations of the LDS Church in the media.

== Mormon FAIR-Cast ==
FAIR also sponsors a podcast called the Mormon FAIR-Cast. In 2011 and 2013, it won an award for best podcast in the Religion Inspiration category of the People's Choice Podcast Awards.

== See also ==
- Interpreter
- Foundation for Ancient Research and Mormon Studies (FARMS)
- Mormon apologetics
- Mormon blogosphere
- Mormon studies
