= Mormon views on suicide =

Topic article

On many occasions spanning over a century, leaders of the Church of Jesus Christ of Latter-day Saints (LDS Church) have taught that suicide is against the will of God, though, Church teachings on suicide have changed through the years. As of 2013 the LDS Church opposes physician-assisted suicide and euthanasia.

== Leader statements ==
One of the earliest recorded explicit mentions by a top church leader was by George Q. Cannon in the First Presidency who stated in an 1893 editorial to LDS youth that "Every member of the Church should be made to understand that it is a dreadful sin to take one’s own life. It is self-murder ...." He echoed this stating, "They who do so are guilty of murder, self-murder it is true ... no one can destroy so precious a gift as that of life without incurring a severe penalty." Cannon recorded that the First Presidency decided those who died by suicide would not receive an honorable burial in their LDS temple robes as was customary for endowed members. This policy is no longer in effect, and current LDS policy is that "The family, in consultation with the bishop, determines the place and nature of a funeral service for a person who has died under such circumstances. Church facilities may be used. If the person was endowed, he or she may be buried in temple clothing.”

In 1987 the apostle M. Russell Ballard also stated that "We cannot measure these particular spiritual experiences [of those who have died by suicide], of course. We do not know the extent to which the door is open for these particular people to grow and develop in righteousness until they possibly receive the blessings of exaltation. They committed a very serious sin, and some consequences of it may remain with them throughout eternity. Only our Father in Heaven knows the full answer to the questions our hearts ask regarding those who take their own lives.."

Church seventy Bruce R. McConkie wrote in his highly influential and doctrinally occasionally-controversial LDS bestseller Mormon Doctrine that "Suicide is murder, pure and simple, and murderers are damned." In the second edition of the book, McConkie updated the entry to say "Obviously persons subject to great stresses may lose control of themselves and become mentally clouded to the point that they are no longer accountable for their acts. Such are not to be condemned for taking their own lives. It should also be remembered that judgment is the Lord's; he knows the thoughts, intents, and abilities of men; and he in his infinite wisdom will make all things right in due course."

In the 2011 LDS Beliefs: A Doctrinal Reference published by the church, the section on suicide called it "self-murder" and stated that, "modern prophets and apostles have likewise spoken clearly about the seriousness of murder, including self-murder and the severity of consequences associated therewith." It also says "Because we do not understand all the circumstances surrounding someone’s suicide, the level of the person’s accountability, and the penalty that the Lord, in his infinite love and wisdom, may see fit to inflict upon the person, we must avoid judgment. Regardless of those circumstances and the Lord’s divinely imposed punishment, followers of Christ are to be loving and compassionate to those who are hurt by a loved one’s act of suicide. They are real victims themselves. Therefore, nothing in our comments or actions should inflict additional pain or add to the heavy emotional burdens they already bear. "

In 2018, the apostle Dale G. Renlund said, "There's an old sectarian notion that suicide is a sin and that someone who commits suicide is banished to hell forever. That is totally false. I believe the vast majority of cases will find that these individuals have lived heroic lives and that that suicide will not be a defining characteristic of their eternities."

== Church suicide prevention efforts ==
In June 2016 the church published its official Mental Health website followed shortly in September 2016 by its official Preventing Suicide website. In April 2018, the LDS Church donated $150,000 to the state of Utah to aid in suicide prevention. In July 2018, the LDS Church donated $25,000 to the LGBT advocacy group Affirmation: LGBT Mormons, Families & Friends to aid in worldwide suicide prevention training.

== Leader statements on LGBT Mormon suicides ==
The LDS Church released a statement through spokesman Dale Jones on 28 January 2016 mourning the reported suicides of 32 LGBT Mormons. Leaders and members are instructed to "reach out in an active, compassionate way to all, especially to adolescents who feel estranged or alone," according to the press release." On 9 February 2016 when apostle Dallin H. Oaks was asked about church leaders and members' responsibility for the treatment of LGBT individuals that may have precipitated in suicides he stated "that's a question that will be answered on judgment day" and that "nobody is sadder about a case like that than I am."

== See also ==
- David family murder–suicide
