= Joseph Smith's views on Black people =

Mormon founder's teachings on race

Joseph Smith's views on Black people varied during his lifetime. As founder of the Latter Day Saint movement, he included Black people in many ordinances and priesthood ordinations, but held multi-faceted views on racial segregation, the curses of Cain and Ham, and shifted his views on slavery several times, eventually coming to take an anti-slavery stance later in his life.

== Curses of Cain and Ham ==
Smith taught that Black people were under the curse of Ham, and the curse of Cain. He referred to the curses as a justification for slavery, and also taught that dark skin marked people of African ancestry as cursed by God. In Smith's revisions of the King James Bible, and production of the Book of Abraham (part of the Pearl of Great Price) he traced their cursed state back to the curses placed on Cain and Ham, and linked the two curses by positioning Ham's Canaanite posterity as matrilinear descendants of Cain. In another book of the Pearl of Great Price the descendants of Cain are described as dark-skinned. The biblical account of the Hamitic curse origins states that Ham discovered his father Noah drunk and naked in his tent. Because of this, Noah cursed Ham's son, Canaan to be "servants of servants". Although the scriptures do not mention Ham's skin color, some doctrines associated the curse with Black people and used it to justify slavery.

== Temple and priesthood ordinances ==
Smith was present at the priesthood ordination of Elijah Abel, a man of partial African descent, to the offices of both elder and seventy, and allowed for the ordination of a couple of other Black men into the priesthood of the early church. Smith's successor, Brigham Young, would later adopt the policy of prohibiting Black people from receiving the priesthood after Smith's death. In 1841, Joseph Smith stated that if the opportunity to Black people were equal to the opportunity provided to White people, Black people could perform as well or even outperform White people. Joseph Smith stated, about Black individuals, "They have souls, and are subjects of salvation. Go into Cincinnati or any city, and find an educated negro, who rides in his carriage, and you will see a man who has risen by the powers of his own mind to his exalted state of respectability."

Historian Fawn Brodie stated in her biography of Smith that he crystallized his hitherto vacillating views on Black people with his authorship of The Book of Abraham, one of the LDS church's foundational texts, which justifies a priesthood ban on ancient Egyptians, who inherited the curse of the Black skin based on their descent from Noah's son Ham. Brodie also wrote that Smith developed the theory that Black skin was a sign of neutral behavior during a pre-existent war in heaven. The official pronouncements of the church's First Presidency in 1949 and 1969 also attributed the origin of the priesthood ban to Joseph Smith, stating that the reason "antedates man's mortal existence." Several other scholars, such as Armand Mauss and Lester E. Bush, have since contested this theory, though, citing that a priesthood ban was never, in fact, implemented in Joseph Smith's time and that Smith allowed for the ordination of several Black men to the priesthood and even positions of authority within the church. Critics of Brodie's theory that the priesthood ban began with Joseph Smith generally agree that the prohibition originated as a series of racially motivated administrative policies under Brigham Young, rather than revealed doctrine, which were inaccurately represented as revelation by later general authorities of the church. The denial of the priesthood to Black church members can easily be traced to Brigham Young, but there is no contemporary evidence that would suggest it originated with Joseph Smith. Mauss and Bush found that all references to Joseph Smith supporting the doctrine were made long after his death and seem to be the result of an attempted reconciliation of the contrasting beliefs and policies of Brigham Young and Joseph Smith. Young himself also never associated the priesthood ban with Joseph Smith's teachings, nor did most of the earliest general authorities. Mauss and Bush detailed various problems with the theory that the Book of Abraham justified a priesthood restriction on Black people, pointing out that the effort to link Pharaoh and the Egyptian people with "black skin" and the antediluvian people of Canaan was "especially strained" and the lack of specificity in the account made such beliefs somewhat ungrounded. Outside of the Church of Jesus Christ of Latter-day Saints, most other Latter-day Saint churches remained open to the ordination of Black men and young men into the priesthood.

== Segregation and Black–White marriages ==
Smith argued that Black and White people would be better off if they were "separate but legally equal", at times advocating for segregation and stating, "Had I anything to do with the negro, I would confine them by strict law to their own species, and put them on a national equalization." Smith opposed Black–White interracial marriages, even fining people in two instances in Nauvoo.

== Views on Black enslavement ==
Initially, Smith expressed opposition to slavery, but after the church was formally organized in 1830, Smith and other authors of the church's official newspaper, The Evening and Morning Star, avoided any discussion of the controversial topic. The major reason behind this decision was the mounting contention between the Mormon settlers, who were primarily abolitionists, and the non-Mormon Missourians, who usually supported slavery. Church leaders like Smith often attempted to avoid the topic and took a public position of neutrality during the Missouri years.

On December 25, 1832, Smith authored "Revelation and Prophecy on War." In this text, Smith stated that "wars ... will shortly come to pass, beginning at the rebellion of South Carolina [and] ... poured out on all nations." He said, "it shall come to pass, after many days, slaves shall rise up against their masters, who shall be marshaled and disciplined for war." It was another two decades until the church formally disclosed the document to the general public. The document would later be canonized by the church as Section 87 of the Doctrine and Covenants.

During the Missouri years, Smith attempted to maintain peace with the members' pro-slavery neighbors. In August 1835, the church issued an official statement declaring that it was not "right to interfere with bond-servants, nor baptize them contrary to the will and wish of their masters" nor cause "them to be dissatisfied with their situations in this life." After this time, the official policy of the church was not to baptize enslaved people without their enslaver's consent, but this was only loosely enforced, and some enslaved people, such as 13-year-old Samuel D. Chambers, were baptized in secret. In April 1836, Smith published an essay sympathetic to the pro-slavery cause, arguing against a possible "race war", providing cautious justification of slavery based on the biblical Curse of Ham, and stating that Northerners had no "more right to say that the South shall not hold slaves, than the South have to say that the North shall."

Anti-Mormon sentiment among the non-Mormon Missourians continued to rise. Many Missouri public officials published a manifesto, stating that "In a late number of the Star, published in Independence by the leaders of the sect, there is an article inviting free Negroes and mulattoes from other states to become 'Mormons,' and remove and settle among us." The manifesto continued: "It manifests a desire on the part of their society, to inflict on our society an injury that they know would be to us entirely insupportable, and one of the surest means of driving us from the country; for it would require none of the supernatural gifts that they pretend to, to see that the introduction of such a caste among us would corrupt our blacks, and instigate them to bloodshed." Eventually, the contention became too great, and violence broke out between the Latter-day Saints and their neighbors in a conflict now referred to as the Missouri Mormon War. Governor Lilburn Boggs issued Executive Order 44, ordering the members of the church to leave Missouri or face death. The Latter Day Saints were forcibly removed and came to settle in Nauvoo, Illinois.

During the Nauvoo settlement, Smith began preaching abolitionism and the equality of the races. During his presidential campaign, Smith called for "the break down [of] slavery", writing that America must "Break off the shackles from the poor black man, and hire him to labor like other human beings." He advocated that existing enslaved people be purchased from their enslavers using funds gained from the sale of public lands and the reduction of federal legislators' salaries, and called for the several million newly freed slaves to be transported to Texas. Joseph Smith wished to free all enslaved people through this process by 1850. Mormon historian Arnold K. Garr has commented that Smith's chief concern was not slavery but the exercise of executive power. On February 7, 1844, Smith would write that "Our common country presents to all men the same advantages, the facilities, the same prospects, the same honors, and the same rewards; and without hypocrisy, the Constitution, when it says, 'We, the people of the United States, ... do ordain and establish this Constitution for the United States of America,' meant just what it said without reference to color or condition, ad infinitum."

== See also ==
- Mormonism and slavery
- Racial segregation of churches in the US
- Proslavery
