= E. E. Ericksen =

American philosopher (1882–1967)

- Born: January 2, 1882; Logan, Utah, U.S.
- Died: December 23, 1967 (aged 85)

Education
- Education: University of Chicago

Philosophical work
- Era: Modern philosophy
- Institutions: University of Utah

Ephraim Edward Ericksen (January 2, 1882 – 1967) was an American philosopher and Mormon scholar who taught philosophy at the University of Utah for 30 years. He was a president of the American Philosophical Association, and is known as an influential figure in LDS intellectual history. The University of Utah E. E. Ericksen Chair of Philosophy was established in his honor in 1965.
