= Naming and blessing of children =

The naming and blessing of a child (commonly called a baby blessing) in the Church of Jesus Christ of Latter-day Saints (LDS Church) is a non-saving ordinance, usually performed during sacrament meeting soon after a child's birth in fulfillment of the commandment in the Doctrine and Covenants: "Every member of the church of Christ having children is to bring them unto the elders before the church, who are to lay their hands upon them in the name of Jesus Christ, and bless them in his name." The purpose of the practice is twofold: to give a baby an official name and to provide an opportunity to give a blessing for the child's spiritual and physical welfare. This practice is usually only performed for infants, though older children may also receive the blessing; adult or teenaged converts to the church do not receive a comparable ordinance.

== Procedure ==
To offer the blessing, Melchizedek priesthood holders—often including priesthood leaders, family members and close friends—gather in a circle and hold the child in their arms or place their hands on the child's head if the child is older. One of them performs the blessing. Typically, this consists of the following:

- Addressing Heavenly Father
- Stating that the blessing is being given by the authority of the Melchizedek priesthood
- Giving a name
- Adding a blessing on the child as directed by the inspiration of the Holy Spirit

The blessing is closed in the name of Jesus Christ.

After the blessing has been performed, a certificate is provided that details the date of the blessing and who officiated; it is signed by the presiding officer of the ward or branch. A membership record is created for children who receive this blessing: they are counted as members of the church and described as "children of record". They remain on the church rolls unless they reach adulthood without being baptized or a request for name removal is received from their legal guardians. Children who were blessed in the church become confirmed members of the church when they receive the ordinances of baptism and confirmation, normally soon after their eighth birthday.

Naming and blessing of a child usually occurs in the monthly fast and testimony meeting, but may be performed in any sacrament meeting or at a private event attended by the bishop or one of his counselors.

== Policies and restrictions ==
Babies who are born out of wedlock may receive a name and a blessing. When one of the child's parents is a non-member, the bishop must receive verbal permission from both parents before the child can be blessed. If a newborn infant is critically ill, a Melchizedek priesthood holder may bless the child without previous authorization of the bishop. As of April 2019, a natural or adopted child of a parent living in a same-sex relationship may receive a name and a blessing.

== Cultural aspects ==
It is common for this blessing to be an occasion for family members to gather. In some families, it is also traditional for the baby or older child to be dressed in white clothing similar to a christening gown, but this is not required.

== See also ==
- Patriarchal blessing
- christening in other Christian traditions
