= George H. Brimhall =

American educator

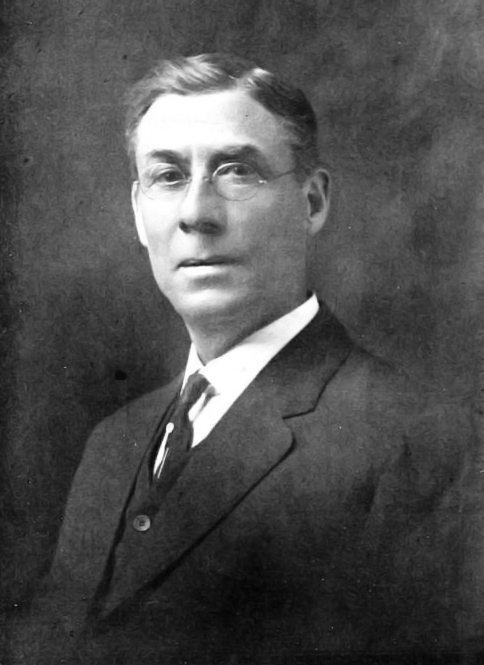

President of Brigham Young University
- In office April 1904 – July 1921
- Preceded by: Benjamin Cluff
- Succeeded by: Franklin S. Harris

Personal details
- Born: December 9, 1852 Salt Lake City, Utah, U.S.
- Died: July 29, 1932 (aged 79) Provo, Utah, U.S.

George Henry Brimhall (December 9, 1852 – July 29, 1932) was president of Brigham Young University (BYU) from 1904 to 1921. After graduating from Brigham Young Academy (BYA), Brimhall served as principal of Spanish Fork schools and then as district superintendent of Utah County schools, finally returning to BYU. In April 1904, Brimhall became president of the school, which had become BYU in October 1903. As president of BYU, Brimhall helped institute the collegiate program, departments for specific subjects, and an emphasis on religious learning.

== Early life ==
Brimhall was born to George W. Brimhall and Rachel Ann Meyer in Salt Lake City. When Brimhall was about a year old his family moved to Ogden and then moved to Spanish Fork, which is where Brimhall attended Timpanogos University. Because of his family's financial situation, one semester they gave the school a side of beef to pay for his tuition. After working closely with instructor George Carson at a Spanish Fork common school, he moved back to Spanish Fork, became a teacher, and received a county teacher's certificate. In 1874, Brimhall married Alsina Elizabeth Wilkins, with whom he eventually had six children.

== Early career ==
While in Spanish Fork, Brimhall was involved with the city's civil affairs. He became city marshal in 1875, but only for a short period of time and was later appointed as "auditor of accounts" for two terms. He also organized a literary and debate society and helped build a schoolhouse called "The Young Men's Academy." He eventually became principal of the academy. After being involved in most of the educational events in Utah County, Brimhall became interested in BYA and decided to begin attending in 1876. In 1877, Brimhall graduated from Maeser school, but often struggled to get good scores on teacher examinations and other academic assessments. In 1883, Brimhall was elected as the district superintendent of Utah County schools and oversaw many other educational programs in Utah County and in Salt Lake City. He worked closely with Warren Newton Dusenberry, who was an instructor at BYA. Brimhall also worked with the Sunday School organization of the Church of Jesus Christ of Latter-day Saints (LDS Church) and taught classes for the church's Young Men Mutual Improvement Association. He published some articles in the Contributor Magazine and was on the local board of examiners. He eventually moved from Spanish Fork to Provo in order to take his place as head of the Provo community schools.

In 1890, Abraham O. Smoot invited Brimhall to be a part of the faculty at BYA as a church calling. Through BYA and with special instruction from Benjamin Cluff, Brimhall was finally able to complete a college degree, while simultaneously heading the Intermediate Department and Preparatory School. When Cluff became BYA's principal, Brimhall took his place as head of the Normal Department, but continued in his position over the Training School as well. Then in 1894, Cluff returned to Michigan to complete his graduate work and left Joseph B. Keeler and Brimhall as co-acting principals of BYA. Both Brimhall and Keeler had desires to follow Cluff's example and go east to study, but because Keeler had been at BYA longer, he was permitted to go east first. Because of this delay in Brimhall's education, he would never again have such an interest in pursuing higher education. This became one of the greatest weaknesses of his administration.

In 1897, Brimhall was called by John W. Taylor to serve a month-long mission in Colorado. While in Colorado, Brimhall became ill, along with others he contracted continued the rest of his life. When he returned to BYA after his mission, he continued to work closely with Cluff. They worked to persuade the state legislature to recognize the BYA Normal School. He also worked closely with church leaders in Salt Lake City and in 1898, he became an official member of the Church Board of Education.

== BYA acting president ==
When Cluff left on an expedition to South America, Brimhall was appointed as the temporary superintendent of the LDS Church's schools and acting president of BYA. As acting president, Brimhall encountered many obstacles, especially with the funding of the school and the proposed Church University which threatened the existence of the Academy. Eventually, Brimhall was able to successfully secure enough money to construct a building for BYA's Training School and from the generous donations of the Jesse Knight family and colleagues, a new Central Building for BYA was built. Brimhall served on the high council of the Utah Stake during this time.

Because BYA was being closely watched by the Board of Education and resources were scarce, Brimhall took it upon himself to ensure the success of the students. He began a class to help local parents with childcare, gave emphasis to the importance of student assemblies and clubs, and sent students and faculty to local LDS meetinghouses to speak about the value of education and about BYA. He also gave much of his attention to finding excellent speakers for BYA's summer school and often found himself in the classrooms at the school lecturing and helping individual students with their educational pursuits. Because of this workload, many of Brimhall's past illnesses began to manifest themselves again. Luckily, a couple months after the illness took hold of Brimhall, Cluff returned from South America and was able to take on the responsibilities that Brimhall had been shouldering at BYA. In April 1902, Brimhall went to California to recuperate. The year after Cluff returned, the institution's name was officially changed from BYA to BYU.

== BYU president ==
In December 1903, the board met to appoint a new president for BYU. Brimhall and Keeler, who had served as co-presidents together during Cluff's absence, were the two main candidates. The votes were evenly divided between the two until Stephen L. Chipman decided to vote in favor of Brimhall, breaking the tie. On 16 April 1904, Brimhall was unanimously elected as president of BYU. Following the pattern of LDS Church leadership, the board requested that BYU, Latter-day Saints University, and Brigham Young College appoint a presidency for their respective institutions. Brimhall appointed Keeler and Edwin S. Hinckley as members of the BYU presidency. Just as in past years, the first couple years of Brimhall's presidency were met with financial problems. The church allocated more funds for BYU than any other of the schools supported by its funding, but it still was not enough money to cover BYU's expenses.

Brimhall continued to support the BYU athletics programs, just as his predecessor, Cluff, had done. During Brimhall's presidency, the Training School Building gymnasium was constructed and because football had been banned by the board, the school focused on basketball, baseball, and track. Brimhall was known for his influential speeches that were able to evoke both positive and negative emotions from the students and faculty. He was also known for his outgoing and talkative nature, which helped him secure friends who could come to his aid for emotional and financial hardships.

In 1907, BYU applied to be the official LDS Church university and Brimhall pushed for grants in order to fund the construction of its first university facility. The application to build the facility (now known as the Maeser Building) was approved by the board and BYU was the church's official university for a short time, but because of heated discussions among other Utah educators the board decided to keep all of the church's schools at the same status for the time being. However, BYU was recognized as the LDS Church Teacher's College, which accelerated its increase in prestige among other known universities. During Brimhall's time as BYU president, he helped organize the collegiate program into separate departments in order to increase concentration of certain subject. Class credits were better defined and a more defined separation of high school and college was put into place.

That same year, Brimhall permitted students to paint the letters "B", "Y", and "U" on the mountain nearest to campus, but because of limited time and resources, the "Y" was the only letter put on the mountain. The mountain that the students painted is now called "Y Mountain" In 1908, students built a concrete retaining wall around the Y.

The Maeser building was completed in 1911, but leading up to its completion, Brimhall took it upon himself to invest more in the school just as many students and faculty members had done monetarily for the new university building. In order to achieve the goals that he had set for BYU, Brimhall recruited educators who had degrees from prestigious universities in the East. These educators helped facilitate the organization of the departments and curriculum of the collegiate program. Many controversial topics relating to modernism were introduced to the school through faculty, which caused quite a stir at BYU. After a group of students approached Brimhall and let them know that they were questioning their belief in God because of their exposure to false doctrine, Brimhall and Horace H. Cummings (who was superintendent of the church's schools), decided to approach the board with the hopes of setting a precedent for what could be taught at BYU. After a hearing in front of the board, Ralph Vary Chamberlin, Joseph Peterson, and Henry Peterson, who advocated evolution, biblical criticism and historical criticism were to be dispensed from their teaching positions unless they would change their teachings. This caused many in the press and members of other church institutions to question the church's authority to regulate professor's freedom of speech in the classroom.

A similar controversy at the University of Utah in Salt Lake City — what Brimhall himself at the time described as 'a tempest in a teapot' — erupted four years later in February 1915. There, the dismissals of two professors and two instructors by Joseph T. Kingsbury — and the subsequent resignations of 14 faculty members in protest (including Peterson, who earlier had resigned from BYU) — launched the American Association of University Professors' (AAUP) first institutional academic freedom inquest, spearheaded by AAUP founders Arthur O. Lovejoy and John Dewey. The 1911 BYU controversy, involving some of the same professors, led in part to the University of Utah debacle.

As a result of these intertwined academic storms, the AAUP published, in December 1915, its inaugural volume of the Bulletin of the American Association of University Professors, including the document now known as the 1915 Declaration of Principles on Academic Freedom and Academic Tenure — the AAUP’s foundational statement on the rights and corresponding obligations of members of the academic profession.

Because of the recent controversies between the school and the board, Brimhall was surprised when the school was given $50,000 for BYU high school and $90,000 (initially $25,000) for BYU, although the school still remained in debt. BYU would continue to face financial problems throughout Brimhall's presidency and around 1914 unofficial reports stated that BYU would be closed and moved to Salt Lake City to become part of LDS University. Near the end of Brimhall's time as president, BYU began to emphasize its role as a religious institution, specifically focusing on the importance of testimony and morality. When the United States declared war with Germany in 1917, Brimhall conducted many patriotic assemblies and supported his students who enlisted. In October 1918, under the direction of Brimhall, BYU officially opened an Army Training Corps center. The school continued its growth by building the Mechanic Arts Building, which would be the first step to the construction of separate buildings for each of the colleges within the University.

== Executive committee ==
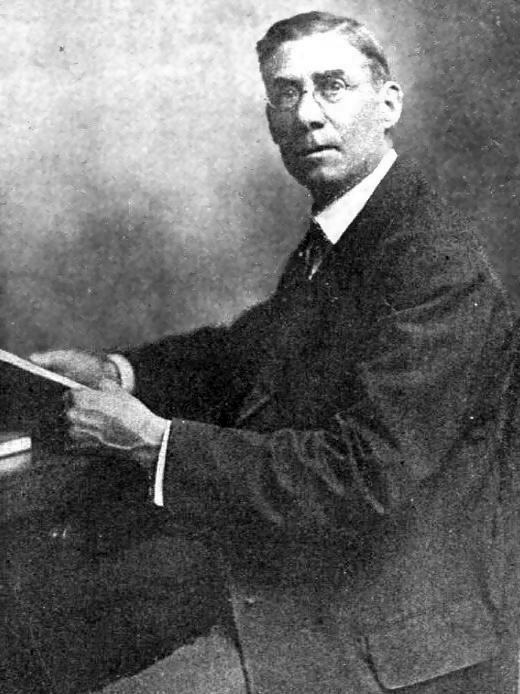
Brimhall in 1922

At a BYU board meeting, Brimhall announced that the church had asked him to devote some of his time to the seminary program. In order to keep BYU running without Brimhall's constant supervision, a faculty executive committee would help with important school affairs. This shift in power marked a new era for BYU. With regards to BYU, Brimhall was focused on the liberal arts program and would often travel with other faculty members to promote the program. Although Brimhall was not as interested in hiring professors from eastern universities, he did keep in touch with (Latter-day Saints|Latter-day Saints students who went to graduate schools and their reports helped Brimhall see the value of advanced degrees. Brimhall also received reports from eastern administrators praising the values and intellectual prowess of students who received their undergraduate education from BYU.

== Post-presidency ==
Suffering from chest and abdominal pain, Brimhall resigned the presidency of BYU in July 1921, although he remained head of the Department of Theology and Religion. Brimhall died by suicide on July 29, 1932, although many newspapers simply reported that he died after a long battle with illness.

== See also ==
- Creation–evolution controversy
- Mormon views on evolution

== Notes ==
Academic offices
Preceded by Benjamin Cluff	President of Brigham Young University; April 1904 – July 1921	Succeeded by Franklin S. Harris
