= Joseph Kingsbury =

Joseph Kingsbury may refer to:

- Joseph C. Kingsbury (1812–1888), Mormon pioneer
- Joseph T. Kingsbury (1853–1937), president of the University of Deseret
- Joseph Kingsbury (Dedham), an early settler of Dedham, Massachusetts
