= 1911 Brigham Young University modernism controversy =

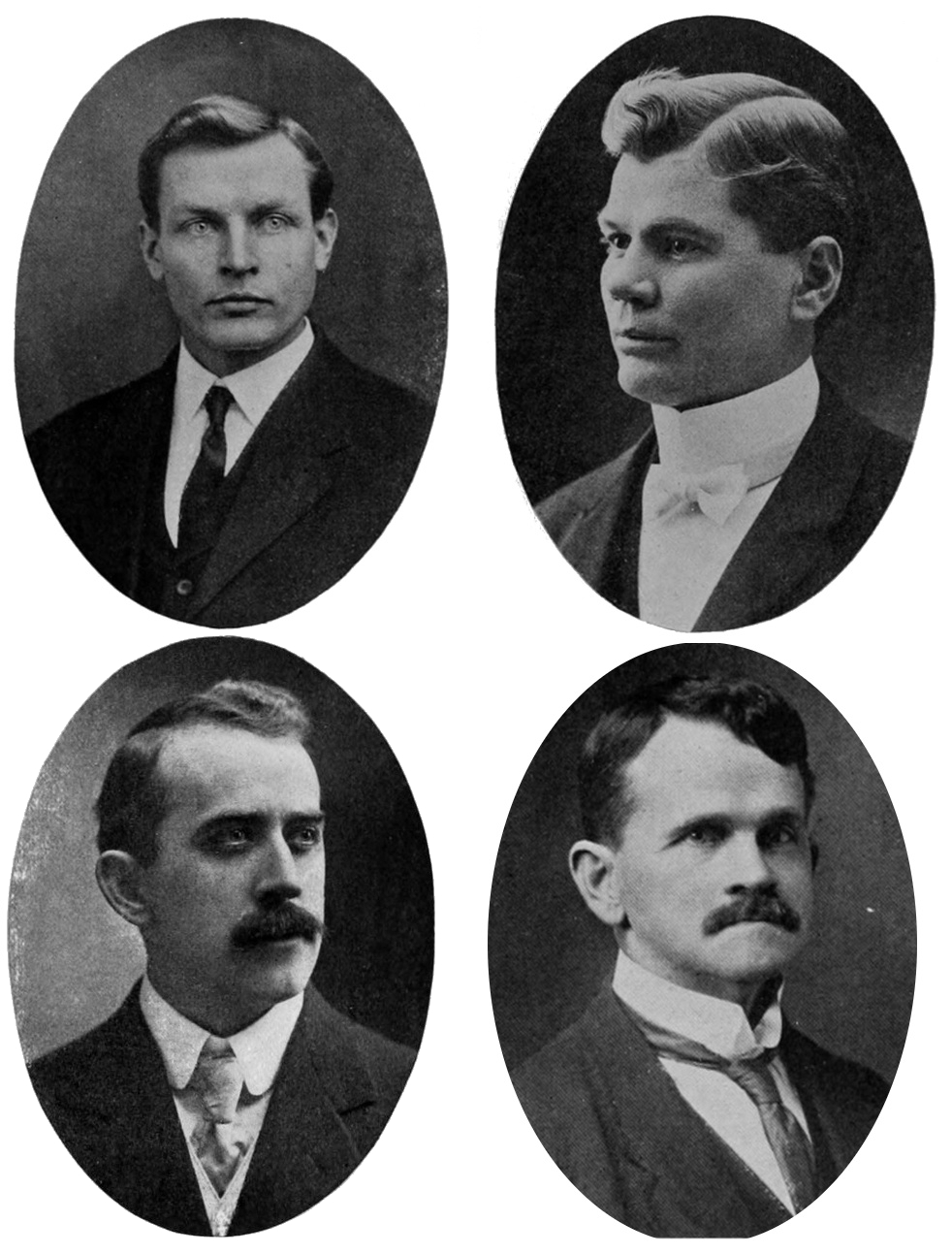
The four professors at the center of the controversy: Joseph and Henry Peterson (top row) and Ralph and W. H. Chamberlin (bottom)

The 1911 modernism controversy at Brigham Young University was an episode involving four professors at Brigham Young University (BYU), who between 1908 and 1911 widely taught evolution and higher criticism of the Bible, arguing that modern scientific thought was compatible with Christian and Mormon theology. The professors were popular among students and the community but their teachings concerned administrators, and drew complaints from stake presidents, eventually resulting in the resignation of all four faculty members, an event that "leveled a serious blow to the academic reputation of Brigham Young University—one from which the Mormon school did not fully recover until successive presidential administrations."

== History ==
In 1907, BYU president George H. Brimhall began hiring a new group of faculty to increase the academic reputation of his school. Joseph Peterson was hired to teach psychology, and his brother Henry Peterson hired as the director of the College of Education. Joseph Peterson was the first Ph.D on the faculty of BYU. In 1908 and 1909 Brimhall hired Ralph Vary Chamberlin and his brother William Henry Chamberlin, to teach biology and philosophy, respectively. The Chamberlin and Peterson brothers, while devout Mormons, actively sought to increase the intellectual atmosphere of the university and community, facilitating discussion and debates on evolution and the Bible, and sought to convey that evolutionary ideas and Mormon theology were not mutually exclusive, but rather complementary. Horace H. Cummings, the superintendent of the church schools, felt especially that teaching religion from non-Mormon sources and teaching evolution was contrary to Latter-day Saint teachings. The four instructors' courses were popular among students and other faculty, but university and church officials accused the professors of promoting heretical views, and in 1911 offered the Petersons and Ralph Chamberlin a choice: alter their teachings or lose their jobs. Privately, Joseph B. Keeler told Ralph Chamberlin he could stay, but he refused, as the Petersons weren't given the same offer.

This ignited a great deal of controversy in the school and surrounding community. The students of BYU overwhelmingly supported the professors, and a petition of support signed by at least 80% of the student body was submitted to BYU officials and reprinted in the Salt Lake Tribune, Salt Lake City's largest secular newspaper. Unwilling to change their teachings, the Petersons and Ralph Chamberlin left the university in 1911, while William remained for another 5 years, resigning in 1916.

The loss of the faculty represented an intellectual loss to the university, and a stifling effect on students as well as faculty. Milton Bennion, writing in March 1911, called the conflict the most significant event in Utah's recent educational history. Ann Weaver Hart wrote that the 1911 BYU controversy made Utah comparatively less emotional and reactionary than other parts of the country during the 1925 Scopes Monkey Trial.

At the University of Utah in Salt Lake City a similar controversy — what some at the time described as 'a tempest in a teapot' — erupted four years later in February 1915. There, the dismissals of two professors and two instructors by President Joseph T. Kingsbury — and the subsequent resignations of 14 faculty members in protest — launched the American Association of University Professors' first institutional academic freedom inquest, spearheaded by AAUP founders Arthur O. Lovejoy and John Dewey. The 1911 BYU controversy — involving some of the same professors, including the Peterson brothers and the Chamberlins — led in part to the University of Utah debacle.

As a result of these intertwined academic storms, the AAUP published the document now known as the 1915 Declaration of Principles on Academic Freedom and Academic Tenure. Appearing in the inaugural December 1915 volume of the Bulletin of the American Association of University Professors, this became the AAUP's foundational statement on the rights and corresponding obligations of members of the academic profession.

== See also ==
- Mormon views on evolution
- History of Brigham Young University
- Creation and evolution in public education in the United States
