= Ralph Vary Chamberlin =

American biologist (1879–1967)

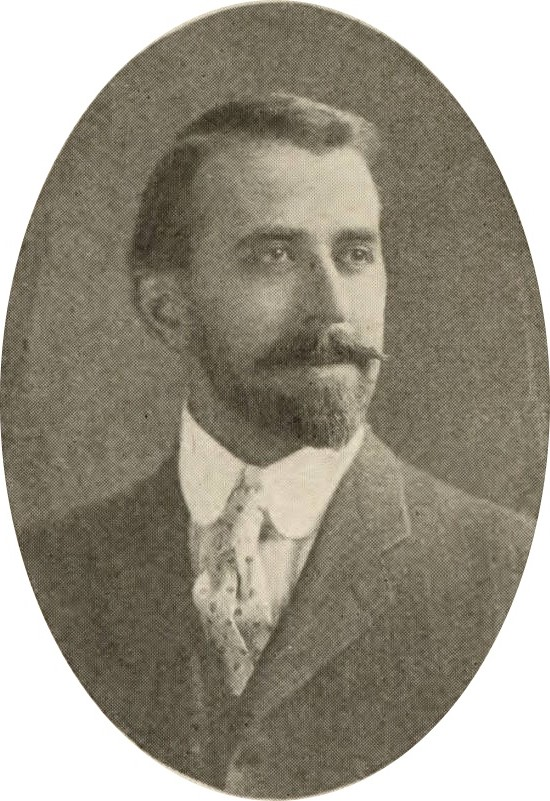
- Chamberlin circa 1905
- Born: January 3, 1879; Salt Lake City, Utah, US
- Died: October 31, 1967 (aged 88); Salt Lake City, Utah, US
- Education: Cornell University; University of Utah
- Known for: Spider and myriapod taxonomy, BYU modernism controversy
- Spouses: Daisy Ferguson (m. 1899; div. 1910) Edith Simons (m. 1922; died 1965)
- Children: 10
- Scientific career
- Fields: Invertebrate zoology; Ethnography; History
- Workplaces: University of Utah; Museum of Comparative Zoology; Brigham Young University
- Thesis: North American Spiders of the Family Lycosidae (1905)
- Doctoral advisor: John Henry Comstock
- Notable students: Willis J. Gertsch; Wilton Ivie; Stephen D. Durrant; William H. Behle

Ralph Vary Chamberlin (Note: His surname is sometimes spelled "Chamberlain" in print, e.g.) (January 3, 1879 – October 31, 1967) was an American biologist, ethnographer, and historian from Salt Lake City, Utah. He was a faculty member of the University of Utah for over 25 years, where he helped establish the School of Medicine and served as its first dean, and later became head of the zoology department. He also taught at Brigham Young University and the University of Pennsylvania, and worked for over a decade at the Museum of Comparative Zoology at Harvard University, where he described species from around the world.

Chamberlin was a prolific taxonomist who named over 4,000 new animal species in over 400 scientific publications. He specialized in arachnids (spiders, scorpions, and relatives) and myriapods (centipedes, millipedes, and relatives), ranking among the most prolific arachnologists and myriapodologists in history. He described over 1,400 species of spiders, 1,000 species of millipedes, and the majority of North American centipedes, although the quantity of his output was not always matched with quality, leaving a mixed legacy to his successors. He also did pioneering ethnobiological studies with the Goshute and other indigenous people of the Great Basin, cataloging indigenous names and cultural uses of plants and animals. Chamberlin was celebrated by his colleagues at the University of Utah, however he was disliked among some arachnologists, including some of his former students. After retirement he continued to write, publishing on the history of education in his home state, especially that of the University of Utah.

Chamberlin was a member of the Church of Jesus Christ of Latter-day Saints (LDS Church). In the early twentieth century, Chamberlin was among a quartet of popular Mormon professors at Brigham Young University whose teaching of evolution and biblical criticism resulted in a 1911 controversy among University and Church officials, eventually resulting in the resignation of him and two other professors despite widespread support from the student body, an event described as Mormonism's "first brush with modernism".

== Biography ==
=== Early life and education ===
Ralph Vary Chamberlin was born on January 3, 1879, in Salt Lake City, Utah, to parents William Henry Chamberlin, a prominent builder and contractor, and Eliza Frances Chamberlin (née Brown). Chamberlin traced his paternal lineage to an English immigrant settling in the Massachusetts Bay Colony in 1638, and his maternal lineage to an old Pennsylvania Dutch family. Born to Mormon parents, the young Chamberlin attended Latter-day Saints' High School, and although very interested in nature, initially decided to study mathematics and art before choosing biology. His brother William, the eldest of 12 children, also shared Ralph's scientific interests and would later teach alongside him. Ralph attended the University of Utah, graduating with a B.S. degree in 1898, and subsequently spent four years teaching high school and some college-level courses in biology as well as geology, chemistry, physics, Latin, and German at Latter-day Saints' University. By 1900 he had authored nine scientific publications.

In the summer of 1902 Chamberlin studied at the Hopkins Marine Station of Stanford University, and from 1902 to 1904 studied at Cornell University under a Goldwin Smith Fellowship, and was a member of the Gamma Alpha fraternity and Sigma Xi honor society. He studied under entomologist John Henry Comstock and earned his doctorate in 1904. His dissertation was a taxonomic revision of the wolf spiders of North America, in which he reviewed all known species north of Mexico, recognizing 67 out of around 150 nominal species as distinct and recognizable. Zoologist Thomas H. Montgomery regarded Chamberlin's monograph as one of "decided importance" in using the structure of pedipalps (male reproductive organs) to help define genera, and in its detailed descriptions of species. (Note: Montgomery, who named twenty wolf spider species of which Chamberlin recognized only two, in critiquing Chamberlin and defending his own species wrote "the main deficiency in [his] revision seems to have been insufficient type material.")

=== Early career: University of Utah ===
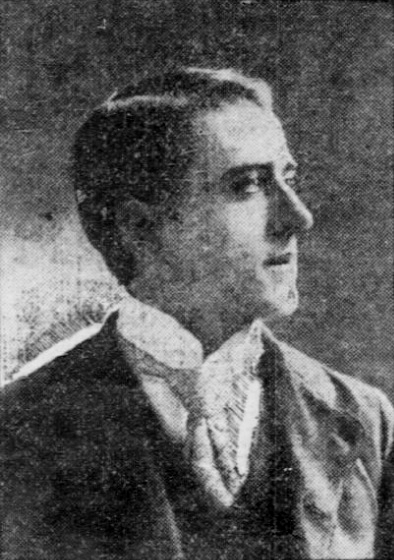
Chamberlin early in his career

It is to Professor Chamberlin that credit should be given for starting medical training in the University of Utah.

— Maxwell M. Wintrobe (1982)

After returning from Cornell, Chamberlin was hired by the University of Utah, where he worked from 1904 to 1908, as an assistant professor (1904–1905) then full professor. He soon began improving biology courses, which at the time were only of high school grade, to collegiate standards, and introduced new courses in vertebrate histology and embryology. He was the first dean of University of Utah School of Medicine, serving from 1905 to 1907. During the summer of 1906, his plans to teach a summer course in embryology at the University of Chicago were cancelled when he suffered a serious accident in a fall, breaking two leg bones and severing an artery in his leg. In 1907, university officials decided to merge the medical school into an existing department, which made Chamberlin's deanship obsolete. He resigned as dean in May, 1907, although remained a faculty member. The medical students strongly objected, crediting the school's gains over the past few years largely to his efforts.

In late 1907 and early 1908, Chamberlin became involved in a bitter lawsuit with fellow Utah professor Ira D. Cardiff that would cost them both their jobs. Cardiff, a botanist hired in spring of 1907, claimed Chamberlin offered him a professorship with a salary of $2,000 to $2,250 per year, but upon hiring was offered only $1,650 by the university regents. (Note: Cardiff and Chamberlin were simultaneously co-defendants in a separate lawsuit filed by a typewriter company, over $70.) Cardiff filed suit for $350, which a court initially decided Chamberlin must pay, and Chamberlin's wages were garnished. The two became estranged and uncommunicative. There had been tension between them for some time—Chamberlin's supporters claimed Cardiff was involved in his dismissal as dean—and the Salt Lake Tribune noted "friction between the two men, of a different nature and not entirely due to financial matters, arose even before Professor Cardiff received his appointment". In March 1908 the university regents fired both Chamberlin and Cardiff, appointing a single new professor to head the departments of zoology and botany. In July, upon appeal, the suit was overturned and Cardiff ordered to pay costs. Chamberlin had by then secured a job at Brigham Young University.

=== Brigham Young University ===
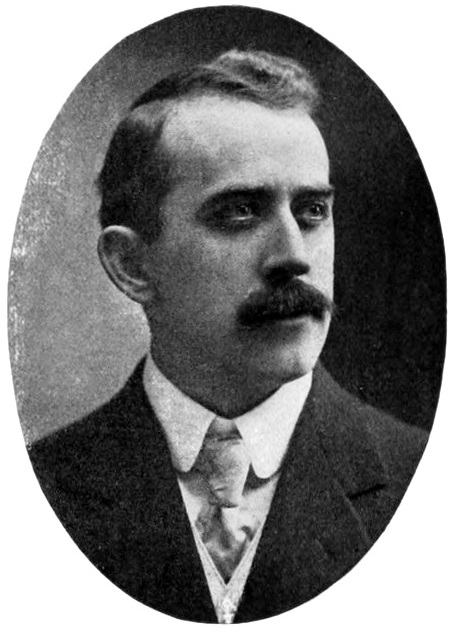
Chamberlin circa 1908

In 1908, Chamberlin was hired to lead the Biology Department at Brigham Young University (BYU), a university owned and operated by the Church of Jesus Christ of Latter-day Saints (LDS Church), during a period which BYU president George H. Brimhall sought to increase its academic standing. LDS College professor J. H. Paul, in a letter to Brimhall, had written Chamberlin was "one of the world's foremost naturalists, though, I think, he is only about 28 years of age. I have not met his equal ... We must not let him drift away". Chamberlin oversaw expanded biology course offerings and led insect-collecting trips with students. Chamberlin joined a pair of newly hired brothers on the faculty, Joseph and Henry Peterson, who taught psychology and education. Chamberlin and the two Petersons worked to increase the intellectual standing of the university. In 1909 Chamberlin's own brother William H. Chamberlin was hired to teach philosophy. The four academics, all active members of the Church, were known for teaching modern scientific and philosophic ideas and encouraging lively debate and discussion. The Chamberlins and Petersons held the belief that the theory of evolution was compatible with religious views, and promoted historical criticism of the Bible, the view that the writings contained should be viewed from the context of the time: Ralph Chamberlin published essays in the White and Blue, BYU's student newspaper, arguing that Hebrew legends and historical writings were not to be taken literally. In an essay titled "Some Early Hebrew Legends" Chamberlin concluded: "Only the childish and immature mind can lose by learning that much in the Old Testament is poetical and that some of the stories are not true historically." Chamberlin believed that evolution explained not only the origin of organisms but of human theological beliefs as well.

In late 1910, complaints from stake presidents inspired an investigation into the teachings of the professors. Chamberlin's 1911 essay "Evolution and Theological Belief" was considered particularly objectionable by school officials. In early 1911 Ralph Chamberlin and the Peterson brothers were offered a choice to either stop teaching evolution or lose their jobs. The three professors were popular among students and faculty, who denied that the teaching of evolution was destroying their faith. A student petition in support of the professors signed by over 80% of the student body was sent to the administration, and then to local newspapers. Rather than change their teachings, the three accused professors resigned in 1911, while William Chamberlin remained for another five years.

In 1910, Chamberlin was elected a fellow of the American Association for the Advancement of Science.

=== Pennsylvania and Harvard ===
After leaving Brigham Young, Chamberlin was employed as a lecturer and George Leib Harrison Foundation research fellow at the University of Pennsylvania from 1911 to 1913. From March 1913 to December 31, 1925, he was the Curator of Arachnids, Myriapods, and Worms at the Museum of Comparative Zoology at Harvard University, where many of his scientific contributions were made. Here his publications included surveys of all known millipedes of Central America and the West Indies; and descriptions of animals collected by the Canadian Arctic Expedition (1913–1916); by Stanford and Yale expeditions to South America; and by various expeditions of the USS Albatross. He was elected a member of the American Society of Naturalists and the American Society of Zoologists in 1914, and in 1919 served as second vice-president of the Entomological Society of America. He served as a technical expert for the U.S. Horticultural Board and U.S. Biological Survey from 1923 until the mid-1930s.

=== Return to Utah ===
Chamberlin returned to the University of Utah in 1925, where he was made head of the departments of zoology and botany. When he arrived, the faculty consisted of one zoologist, one botanist, and an instructor. He soon began expanding the size and diversity of the biology program, and by the time of his retirement the faculty consisted of 16 professors, seven instructors, and three special lecturers. He was the university's most celebrated scientist according to Sterling M. McMurrin, and his course on evolution was among the most popular on campus. He established the journal Biological Series of the University of Utah and supervised the graduate work of several students who would go on to distinguished careers, including Willis J. Gertsch, Wilton Ivie, William H. Behle and Stephen D. Durrant; the latter three would later join Chamberlin as faculty members. From 1930 to 1939, Chamberlin was secretary-treasurer of the Salt Lake City Mosquito Abatement Board and conducted mosquito surveys of the region, identifying marshes controlled by local hunting clubs as the main source of salt marsh mosquitoes plaguing the city. From 1938 to 1939 he took a year-long sabbatical, during which he studied in European universities and museums, presided over a section of the International Congresses of Entomology in Berlin, and later studied biology and archaeology in Mexico and South America. In 1942 he received an honorary Doctor of Science from the University of Utah. He retired in 1948, and in 1957, an honor ceremony was held by the Utah Phi Sigma Society in which a portrait of Chamberlin painted by Alvin L. Gittins was donated to the university and a book of commemorative letters produced. In 1960 the University of Utah Alumni Association awarded Chamberlin its Founders Day Award for Distinguished Alumni, the university's highest honor.

Wherever he has been, [Chamberlin] has produced unusual stimulation in students, many becoming imbued with his enthusiasm for the use of accurate, tested knowledge. Many caught the vision of what human life can mean when viewed in the light of man's evolutionary background and interpreted in terms of his emerging intelligence which has outdistanced so many of his animal competitors in the evolutionary race."

— Angus and Grace Woodbury (1958)

Chamberlin was noted by colleagues at Utah for being a lifelong champion of the scientific method and instilling in his students ideas that natural processes must be used to explain human existence. Angus and Grace Woodbury wrote that one of his greatest cultural contributions was his ability "to lead the naive student with fixed religious convictions gently around that wide gulf that separated him from the trained scientific mind without pushing him over the precipice of despair and illusion." His influence continued as his students became teachers, gradually increasing societal understanding of evolution and naturalistic perspectives. His colleague and former student Stephen Durrant stated "by word, and especially by precept, he taught us diligence, inquisitiveness, love of truth, and especially scientific honesty". Durrant compared Chamberlin to noted biologists such as Spencer Fullerton Baird and C. Hart Merriam in the scope of his contributions science.

=== Personal life and death ===
On July 9, 1899, Chamberlin married Daisy Ferguson of Salt Lake City, with whom he had four children: Beth, Ralph, Della, and Ruth. His first marriage ended in divorce in 1910. On June 28, 1922, he married Edith Simons, also of Salt Lake, and with whom he had six children: Eliot, Frances, Helen, Shirley, Edith, and Martha Sue. His son Eliot became a mathematician and 40-year professor at the University of Utah. Chamberlin's second wife died in 1965, and Chamberlin himself died in Salt Lake City after a short illness on October 31, 1967, at the age of 88. (Note: Biologist Ralph Crabill Jr. lists Chamberlin's death as October 31. Chamberlin's obituaries in the Deseret News and Salt Lake Tribune on Wednesday, November 1, 1967, both state simply Chamberlin "died Tuesday in a Salt Lake hospital." However, Behle (1990) states the date of Chamberlin's death as September 30, 1967.) He was survived by his 10 children, 28 grandchildren, and 36 great-grandchildren.

== Research ==
Chamberlin's work includes more than 400 publications spanning over 60 years. (Note: Durrant tallied 403 papers in 1958, with nine appearing before 1900. His publication record extends to at least 1966, and his obituary states 407 publications.) The majority of his research concerned the taxonomy of arthropods and other invertebrates, but his work also included titles in folklore, economics, anthropology, language, botany, anatomy, histology, philosophy, education, and history. He was a member of the American Society of Naturalists, Torrey Botanical Club, New York Academy of Sciences, Boston Society of Natural History, Biological Society of Washington, and the Utah Academy of Sciences.

=== Taxonomy ===
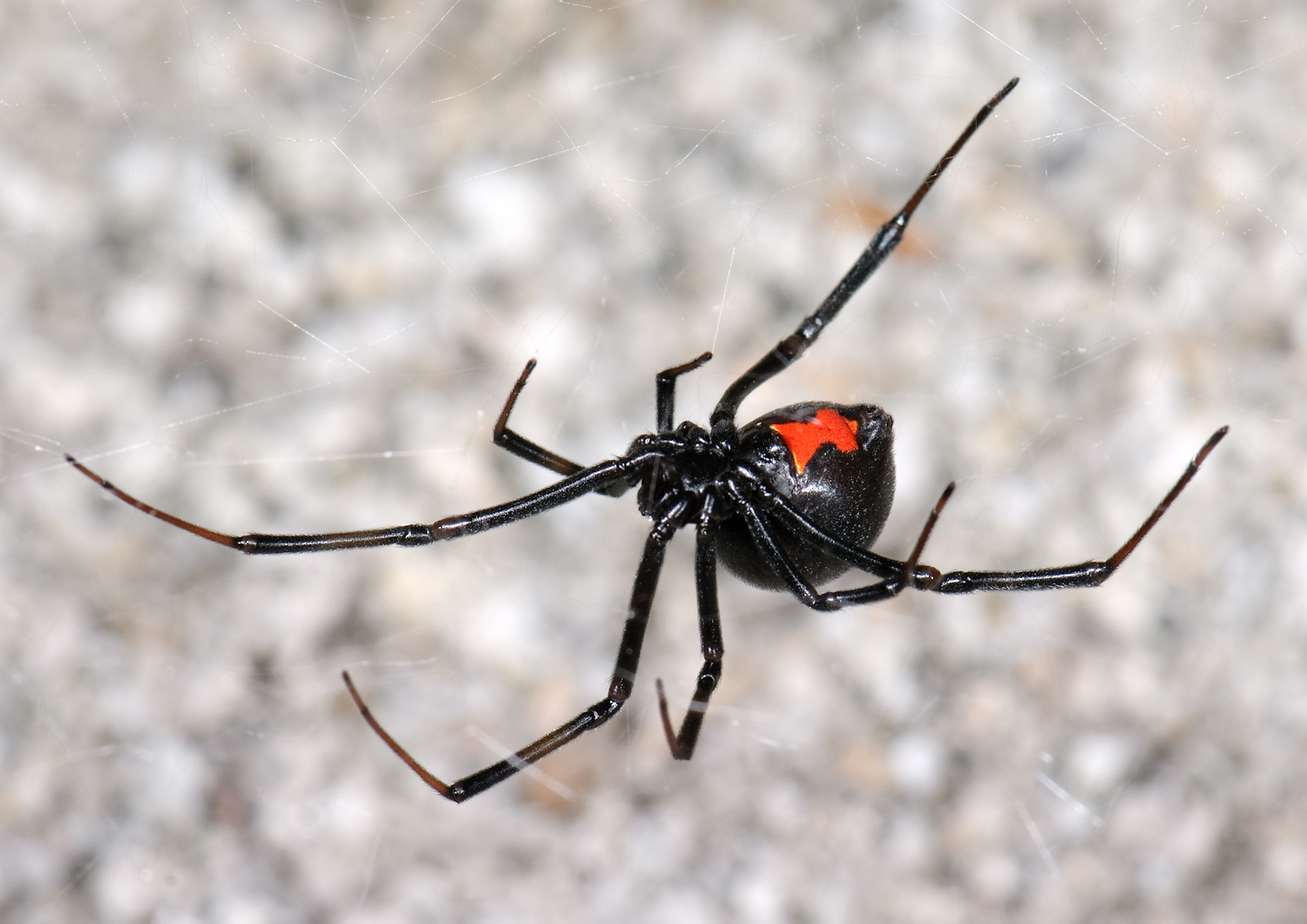
The western black widow, one of the hundreds of spiders described by Chamberlin & Wilton Ivie

Chamberlin was a prolific taxonomist of invertebrate animals who named and described over 4,000 species, specializing in the study of arachnids (spiders, scorpions, and their relatives), and myriapods (millipedes, centipedes, and relatives), but also publishing on molluscs, marine worms, and insects. By 1941 he had described at least 2,000 species, and by 1957 had described a total of 4,225 new species, 742 new genera, 28 new families, and 12 orders. Chamberlin's taxonomic publications continued to appear until at least 1966.

Chamberlin ranks among the most prolific arachnologists in history. In a 2013 survey of the most prolific spider systematists, Chamberlin ranked fifth in total number of described species (1,475) and eighth in number of species that were still valid (984), i.e. not taxonomic synonyms of previously described species. At the University of Utah Chamberlin co-authored several works with his students Wilton Ivie and Willis J. Gertsch, who would both go on to become notable spider scientists: the "famous duo" of Chamberlin and Ivie described hundreds of species together. (Note: One such publication was titled simply "A hundred new species of American spiders".) Chamberlin described or co-described more than a third of the 621 spiders known to occur in his native Utah. Chamberlin was also a leading expert in North American tarantulas, describing over 60 species. Chamberlin worked with other groups of arachnids as well, including scorpions, harvestmen, and schizomids, and described several pseudoscorpions with his nephew Joseph C. Chamberlin, himself a prominent arachnologist.

Among fellow arachnologists, Chamberlin was regarded as influential but not particularly well-liked: in many of his papers co-authored with Ivie, it was Ivie himself who did most of the collecting, and describing, while Chamberlin remained first author, and a 1947 quarrel over recognition led to Ivie abandoning arachnology for many years. When arachnologist Arthur M. Chickering sent Chamberlin a collection of specimens from Panama, Chamberlin never returned them and in fact published on them, which made Chickering reluctant to collaborate with colleagues. Chamberlin is said to have eventually been banned from the Museum of Comparative Zoology by Ernst Mayr in his later years, and after Chamberlin's death his former student Gertsch said "his natural meanness finally got him".

Chamberlin's other major area of study was myriapods. He was publishing on centipedes as early as 1901, and between then and around 1960 was the preeminent, if not exclusive, researcher of North American centipedes, responsible for naming the vast majority of North American species, and many from around the world. In addition, he named more than 1,000 species of millipedes, ranking among the three most prolific millipede taxonomists in history. (Note: Chamberlin, Carl Attems and Karl W. Verhoeff each described over 1,000 millipede species.) His 1958 "Checklist of the millipeds of North America", a compilation eight years in the making of all records and species north of Mexico, represented nearly a 600% increase in species recorded from the previous such list published over 50 years earlier, although the work itself described no new species. Chamberlin contributed articles on millipedes, pauropods and symphylans to the 1961 edition of the Encyclopædia Britannica.

Chamberlin's illustration of Prostemmiulus cooki, one of many new Central American millipedes he described in 1922

Although a prolific describer of species, his legacy to myriapod taxonomy has been mixed. Many of Chamberlin's descriptions of centipedes and millipedes were often brief and/or unillustrated, or illustrated in ways which hindered their use in identification by other researchers. He described some new species based solely on location, or on subtle leg differences now known to change during molting, and many of Chamberlin's names have subsequently been found to be, or are suspected to be, synonyms of species already described. (Note: In one notable case, Chamberlin divided a single sample of millipedes into three subgroups, naming the males as one species, the females as another, and the juveniles as a third species. Another millipede species was described by Chamberlin as five distinct species in three different genera before all were recognized as belonging to Gosodesmus claremontus. See also Lumpers and splitters.) Biologist Richard Hoffman, who worked with Chamberlin on the 1958 checklist, later described Chamberlin as "an exemplar of minimal taxonomy", and stated his taxonomic work on Central American myriapods "introduced far more problems than progress, a pattern which was to persist for many decades to come". Hoffman wrote Chamberlin was "an admitted 'alpha taxonomist' whose main interest was naming new species", although recognized Chamberlin's work with stone centipedes as pioneering, and of a quality unmatched in Chamberlin's later work.

Chamberlin studied not only arthropods but soft-bodied invertebrates as well. He described over 100 new species and 22 new genera of polychaete worms in a two-volume work considered one of the "great monuments" in annelid taxonomy by the former director of the Hopkins Marine Station, and published on Utah's molluscan fauna. He was section editor on sipunculids as well as myriapods for the academic journal database Biological Abstracts. William Behle has noted he also made indirect contributions to ornithology, including leading several multi-day specimen collecting trips and guiding the graduate research of Stephen Durrant, who worked on Utah game birds, and Behle himself, who studied nesting birds of the Great Salt Lake. (Note: Durrant and Behle, the first two graduate students in ornithology at the University of Utah, worked primarily under Chamberlin, although are on record as students of Angus M. Woodbury. Behle published extensively on the birds of Utah. Durrant's thesis was never published, and he became primarily known as a mammalogist.)

After Chamberlin's death, his collection of some 250,000 spider specimens was donated to the American Museum of Natural History in New York, bolstering the museum's status as the world's largest arachnid repository. Similarly, his collection of millipedes was deposited in the National Museum of Natural History in Washington, D.C., helping to make that museum the world's largest single collection of millipede type specimens—the individual specimens used to describe species.

=== Great Basin cultural studies ===
Early in his career, (Note: Chamberlin wrote he was among the Goshutes in the spring of 1901.) Chamberlin studied the language and habits of indigenous peoples of the Great Basin. He worked with the Goshute band of the Western Shoshone to document their uses of over 300 plants in food, beverages, medicine, and construction materials—their ethnobotany—as well as the names and meanings of plants in the Goshute language. His resulting publication, "The Ethno-botany of the Gosiute Indians of Utah", is considered the first major ethnobotanical study of a single group of Great Basin peoples. He also published surveys of Goshute animal and anatomical terms, place and personal names, and a compilation of plant names of the Ute people. One of Chamberlin's later colleagues at the University of Utah was Julian Steward, known as the founder of cultural ecology. Steward himself described Chamberlin's work as "splendid", and anthropologist Virginia Kerns writes that Chamberlin's experience with indigenous Great Basin cultures facilitated Steward's own cultural studies: "in terms of ecological knowledge, [Steward's younger informants] probably could not match the elders who had instructed Chamberlin. That made his research on Goshute ethnobotany all the more valuable to Steward." Chamberlin gave Goshute-derived names to some of the organisms he described, such as the spider Pimoa, meaning "big legs", and the worm Sonatsa, meaning "many hooks", in the Goshute language.

=== Other works ===
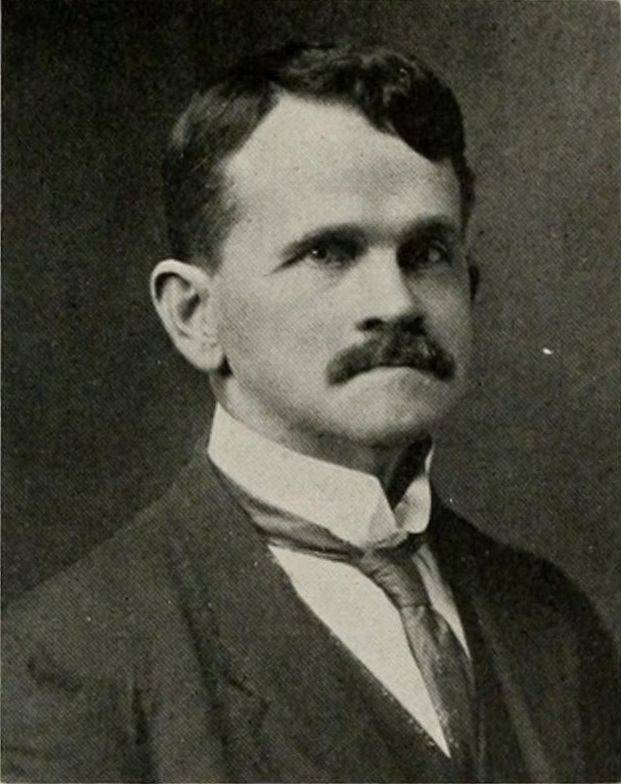
Chamberlin described the philosophical development of his brother W. H. Chamberlin in a 1925 biography.

Chamberlin's work extended beyond biology and anthropology to include historical, philosophical, and theological writings. At BYU he published several articles in the student newspaper on topics such as historical criticism of the Bible and the relationship of evolutionary theory with religious beliefs. In 1925, he wrote a biography of his brother William H. Chamberlin, a philosopher and theologian who had died several years earlier. Utah philosopher Sterling McMurrin, stated the biography "had a considerable impact" on his own life, and noted "the fact that the book adequately and persuasively presents W. H. Chamberlin's philosophic thought shows the philosophical competence of Ralph Chamberlin" In 1932, Chamberlin wrote "Life in Other Worlds: a Study in the History of Opinion", one of the earliest surveys from ancient to modern times of the concept of cosmic pluralism, the idea that the universe contains multiple inhabited worlds. After retiring in 1948, Chamberlin devoted significant attention to the history of the University of Utah. In 1949 he edited a biographical tribute to John R. Park, an influential Utah educator of the 19th century. Assembled from comments and reflections from Park's own students, Memories of John Rockey Park was praised by University of Utah English professor B. Roland Lewis, who claimed it "warrants being read by every citizen of [Utah]." Later in his career, Chamberlin produced an authoritative book, The University of Utah, a History of its First Hundred Years, which BYU historian Eugene E. Campbell called "an excellent history of this important western institution." The University of Utah also contains an extensive account of the University of Deseret, the LDS Church-founded university that preceded the University of Utah.

== Religious views ==
Chamberlin believed wholeheartedly in Darwin's theory of evolution including its least desirable implications such as the brutality of nature implied by natural selection and the descent of man from lower primates. It is also clear that Chamberlin was a devout Mormon ... Chamberlin believed that since science and religion were different parts of one eternal truth they could be reconciled.

— Tim S. Reid (1997)

Chamberlin was a Mormon, an active member of the Church of Jesus Christ of Latter-day Saints (LDS Church). He believed that there should be no animosity between religion and science. Stake President George W. McCune described a 1922 meeting in which Chamberlin testified "to the effect that all his labors and researches in the laboratories of science, while very interesting, and to a great extent satisfying to the intellect, did not satisfy the soul of man, and that he yearned for something more," adding Chamberlin "bore testimony that he knew that ours is the true Church of Jesus Christ." University of Oregon doctoral student Tim S. Reid called Chamberlin clearly devout, however, Sterling McMurrin stated "spiders are different from metaphysics, and I think Ralph was not such a devout Mormon."

== Selected works ==
=== Scientific ===
- The Meaning of Organic Evolution. Provo, Utah: Self-published. 1911. pp. 1–138.
- Chamberlin, Ralph Vary (1919). "The Annelida Polychaeta". Memoirs of the Museum of Comparative Zoology at Harvard College. 31: 1–514, 80 plates.
- Chamberlin, Ralph Vary (1920). "The Myriopoda of the Australian region". Bulletin of the Museum of Comparative Zoology. 64: 1–235.
- "A hundred new species of American spiders" (PDF). Bulletin of the University of Utah. 32 (13): 1–117. 1942. (With Wilton Ivie)
- "Checklist of the millipeds of North America". Bulletin of the United States National Museum. 212: 1–236. 1958. (With Richard L. Hoffman)

=== Historical & biographical ===
- The Life and Philosophy of W. H. Chamberlin. Salt Lake City: Deseret News Press. 1925.
- Memories of John Rockey Park. Salt Lake City: University of Utah Press. 1949.
- Life Sciences at the University of Utah: Background and History. Salt Lake City: University of Utah Press. 1950. pp. 1–417.
- The University of Utah, a History of its First Hundred Years, 1850 to 1950. Salt Lake City: University of Utah Press. 1960. pp. 1–668.
- The Exploration of the Colorado River in 1869 and 1871–1872 (Reprinted from Utah Historical Quarterly v. 15, 1947 ed.). Salt Lake City: University of Utah Press. 2009. ISBN 978-0-87480-963-3. (With William C. Darrah and Charles Kelly)

== Eponymous taxa ==
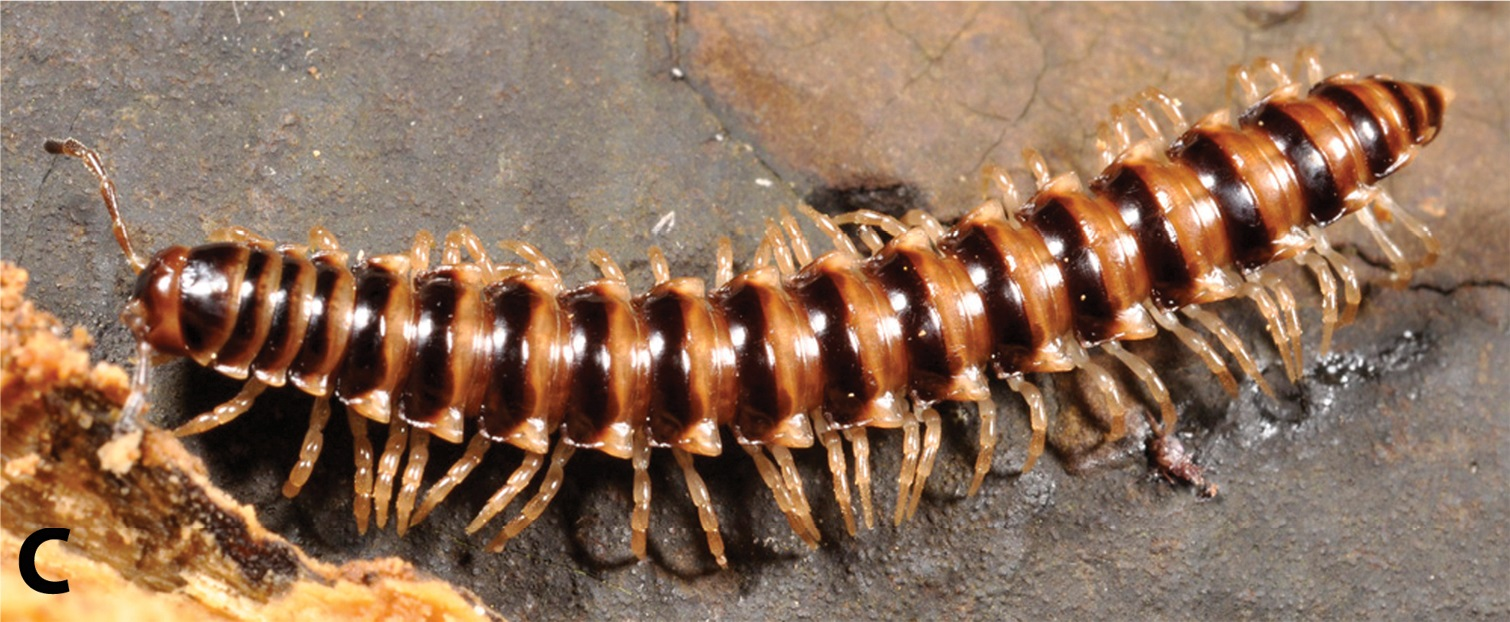
A species of Chamberlinius from Japan's Ryukyu Islands

The taxa (e.g. genus or species) named after Chamberlin are listed below, followed by author(s) and year of naming, and taxonomic family. Taxa are listed as originally described: subsequent research may have reassigned taxa or rendered some as invalid synonyms of previously named taxa.

- Paeromopus chamberlini Brolemann, 1922
- Tibellus chamberlini Gertsch, 1933 (Philodromidae)
- Hivaoa chamberlini Berland, 1942 (Tetragnathidae)
- Euglena chamberlini D. T. Jones, 1944 (Euglenaceae)
- Chondrodesmus chamberlini Hoffman, 1950 (Polydesmida, Chelodesmidae)
- Chamberlinia Machado, 1951 (Geophilomorpha, Oryidae)
- Haploditha chamberlinorum (Note: Named for both Chamberlin and his nephew J. C. Chamberlin) Caporiacco, 1951 (Tridenchthoniidae)
- Rhinocricus chamberlini Schubart, 1951
- Chamberlineptus Causey, 1954 (Spirostreptidae)
- Varyomus Hoffman, 1954 (Polydesmida, Euryuridae)
- Chamberlinius Wang, 1956
- Haplodrassus chamberlini Platnick & Shadab, 1975 (Gnaphosidae)
- Myrmecodesmus chamberlini Shear, 1977 (Pyrgodesmidae)
- Aphonopelma chamberlini Smith, 1995 (Theraphosidae)
- Mallos chamberlini Bond & Opell, 1997 (Dictynidae)
- Pyrgulopsis chamberlini Hershler, 1998 (Hydrobiidae)

== See also ==
- Creation–evolution controversy
- Ann Chamberlin, granddaughter
- Ecology of the Great Basin
- Great Basin Desert
- Mormon views on evolution
