= Brimhall =

Brimhall is a surname. Notable people with the surname include:

- Cynthia Brimhall (born 1964), American model and B-movie actress
- George H. Brimhall (1852–1932), President of Brigham Young University
- George W. Brimhall (1814–1895), politician in territorial Utah
- John Brimhall (1928–2003), American musical arranger and author of books on music composition, theory, and performance

== See also ==
- Brimhall, Utah, locality in Salt Lake County, Utah, United States
- Brimhall Nizhoni, New Mexico, census-designated place (CDP) in McKinley County, New Mexico, United States
- Grant R. Brimhall Library serves as the main library for the city of Thousand Oaks, California
