= Emma McVicker =

American politician (1846–1916)

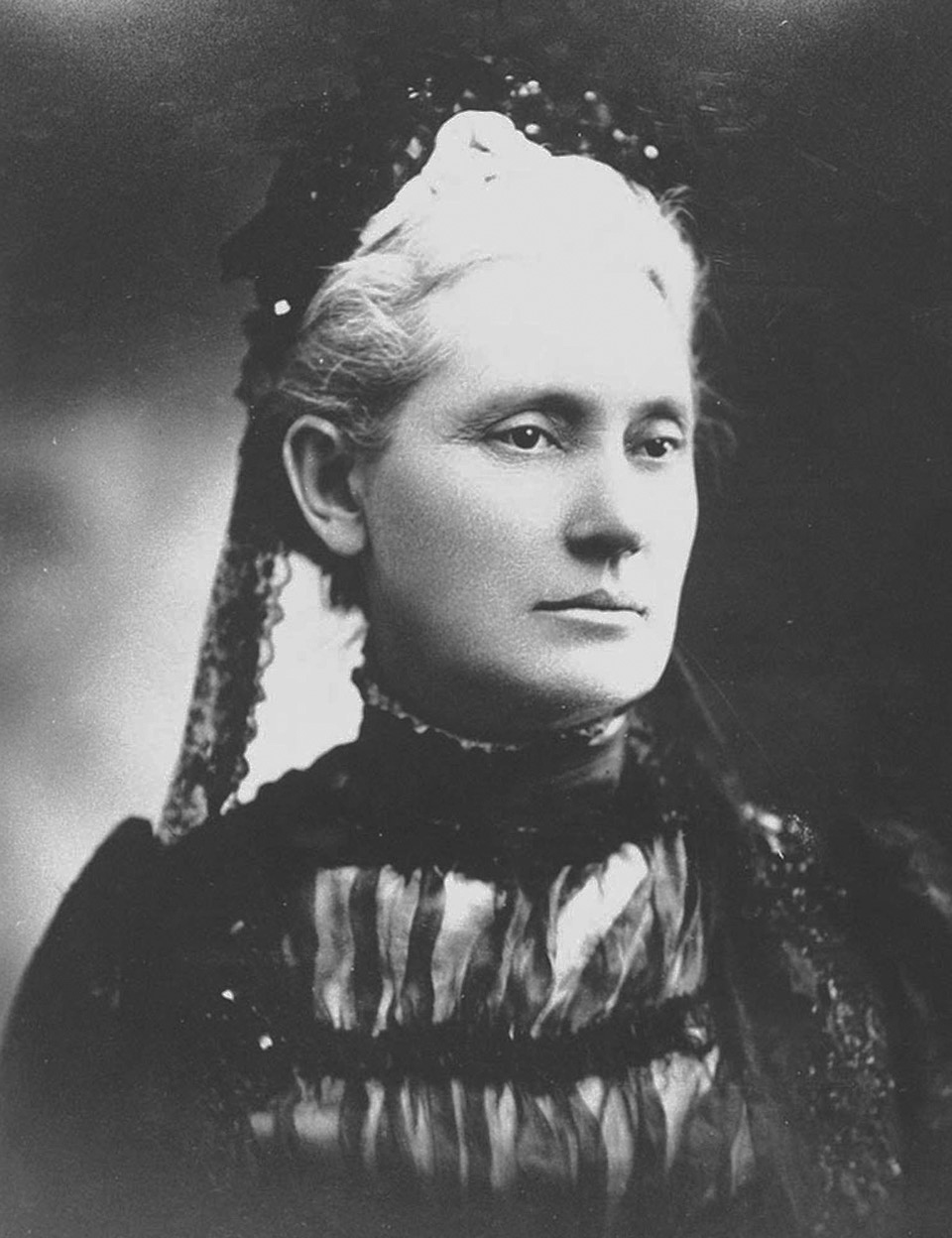
Emma McVicker, Salt Lake Tribune

Emma McViker (1846-1916) was the second state superintendent of education for the state of Utah. She served in this position from the death of John R. Park until A. C. Nelson succeeded her after he was elected to the position in 1900.

== Biography ==
She was born Emma Kelly in Watertown, New York. She received her education at Downer College in Milwaukee, Wisconsin. She came to Salt Lake City to work at the Salt Lake Collegiate Institute (now Westminster College) where she became principal serving till 1884. In 1884, she became a regent of the University of Utah. She received her bachelor's degree from the University of Utah in 1888. In 1886, she had married John McVicker who had come to Utah from California to work as an assayer.

McVicker became a leading advocate of Kindergarten. She founded the Free Kindergarten Association in Salt Lake City which eventually evolved into Neighborhood House. This organization had a key role in including Kindergarten in the new Utah constitution.

== Political career ==
She was the Republican Candidate for State Superintendent of Education in 1895 but was excluded because the state constitution allowing women to vote and hold office was not yet in effect. In 1900, when John R. Park died, she was appointed by Governor Heber Wells to succeed him as superintendent of instruction. As superintendent of instruction she advocated an active role for children in the learning process.

McVicker was also involved in various women clubs. She served for a time as president of the Women's Federation of Clubs of Utah. In 1905, she earned a master's degree from the University of California. Much of her will went to start the McVicker Loan Fund to provide no-interest loans to University of California students.

== Sources ==
- Utah Women's history bio of McVicker
- October 13, 1900 Deseret News article on McVicker
- https://www.utahwomenshistory.org/bios/emmamcvicker/
