= David Calder =

David Calder may refer to:

- David Calder (rower) (born 1978), Canadian rower and Olympic athlete
- David Calder (actor) (born 1946), British actor
- David O. Calder (1823–1884), Mormon pioneer and journalist
