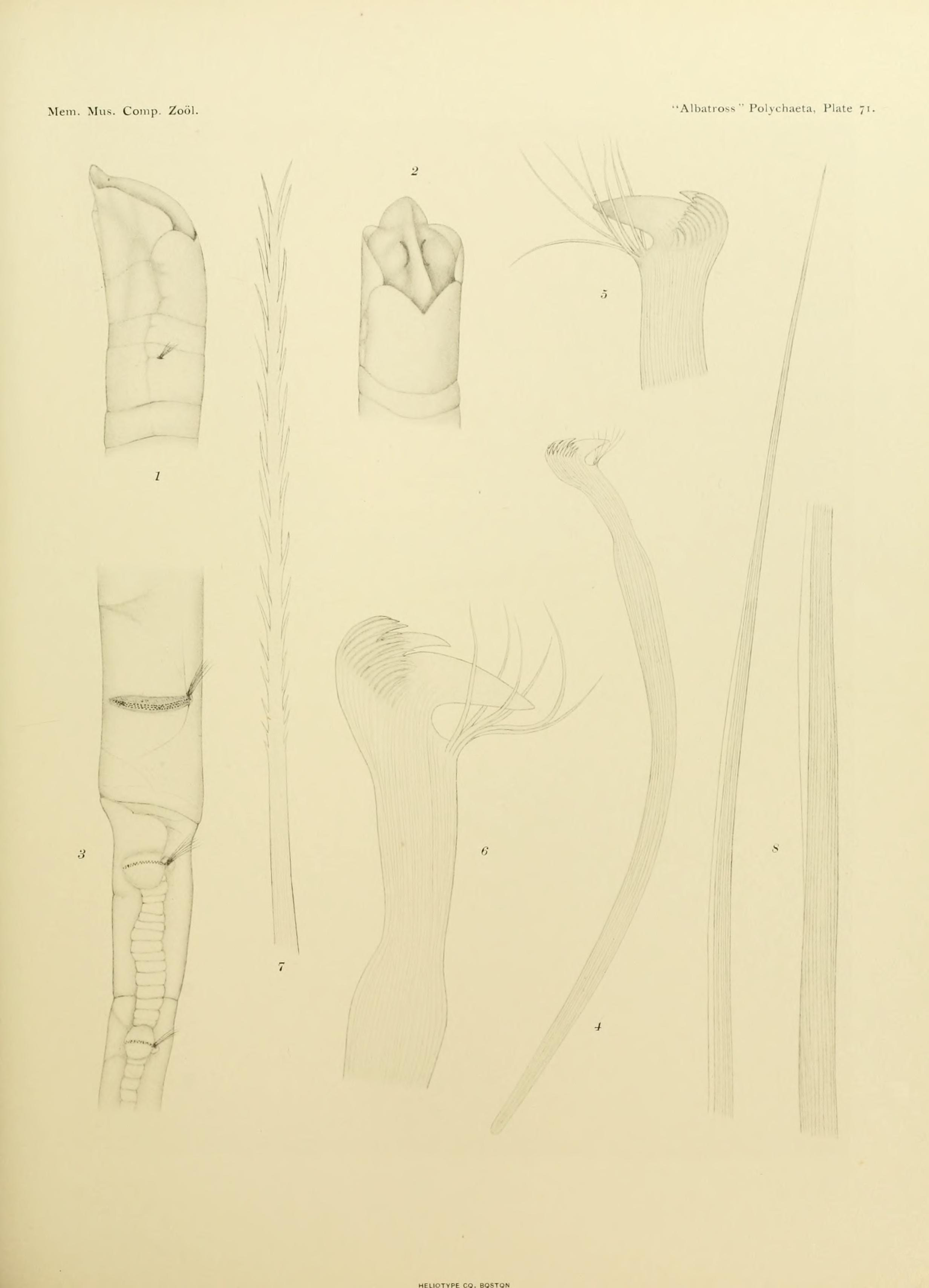
- Anatomy of S. meridionalis

Scientific classification
- Kingdom: Animalia
- Phylum: Annelida
- Clade: Pleistoannelida
- Clade: Sedentaria
- Clade: Maldanomorpha
- Family: Maldanidae
- Genus: Sonatsa; Chamberlin, 1919
- Species: S. meridionalis

Binomial name
- Sonatsa meridionalis Chamberlin, 1919

= Sonatsa =

Genus of annelid

Sonatsa is a genus of marine, mud-dwelling polychaete worms containing the sole species Sonatsa meridionalis. S. meridionalis was described in 1919 by Ralph Vary Chamberlin from a single specimen collected by the research ship USS Albatross during a 1904–05 survey of the southeast Pacific Ocean. The type specimen was collected between Peru and the Galapagos Islands, from muddy sediment at a depth of around 4 km. The name Sonatsa derives from the Goshute words soma, meaning "many", and natsani, meaning "hook", while the specific name meridionalis is Latin for "southern".
