= Stephen David Durrant =

American mammalogist (1902–1975)

- Born: October 11, 1902
- Died: November 11, 1975 (aged 73)
- Education: University of Utah
- Known for: President of the American Society of Mammalogists
- Scientific career
- Fields: Mammalogy
- Institutions: University of Utah

Stephen David Durrant (October 11, 1902 – November 11, 1975) was an American mammalogist from Salt Lake City, Utah and past president of the American Society of Mammalogists known for his work with pocket gophers of the genus Thomomys and other rodents of the Great Basin. The "foremost mammalogist in Utah," he was professor of zoology at the University of Utah for over 40 years.

Born October 11, 1902, Durant served as a missionary for the Church of Jesus Christ of Latter-day Saints (LDS Church) in Switzerland after high school. After his return, he enrolled in the University of Utah, earning an A.B. in French in 1929. He stayed at the University of Utah for graduate school, pursuing zoology and earning a M.S. under Ralph V. Chamberlin in 1931. After pursuing doctoral research first at the University of Minnesota, then University of California, Berkeley, and working several jobs while raising a family, he received his Ph.D. in 1950 from the University of Kansas. Over the course of his career he described 37 new subspecies or races of assorted small mammals, including gophers, mice, kangaroo rats, beavers, and picas. He died from lung cancer on November 11, 1975.

Durrant's 1952 book Mammals of Utah: Taxonomy and Distribution presented taxonomic synopses of 247 species and subspecies of Utah mammals, as well as Durrant's explanations for the origins of such diversity: largely that the geographic and hydrological history of the region, especially the prehistoric Lake Bonneville, promotes reproductive isolation and subsequent speciation or sub-speciation.
