= Joseph Peterson (psychologist) =

American psychologist

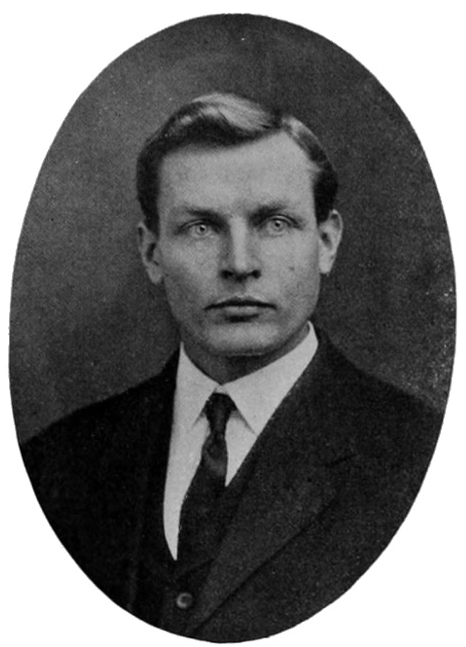
- Peterson, c. 1911
- Born: September 8, 1878; Huntsville, Utah, U.S.
- Died: September 20, 1935 (aged 57); Berkeley, California, U.S.
- Education: University of Chicago
- Known for: Past president, American Psychological Association
- Scientific career
- Fields: Psychology

Joseph Peterson (September 8, 1878 – September 20, 1935) was an American psychologist and a past president of the American Psychological Association (APA).

== Early life ==
Joseph Peterson was born on September 8, 1878, in Huntsville, Utah. His parents, Hans Jorgen Peterson and Inger Mary Christensen, were members of The Church of Jesus Christ of Latter-day Saints who had immigrated from Denmark to the United States.

Peterson attended Brigham Young University, the University of Utah and the University of California, before earning a B.S. in 1905 and Ph.D. in 1907 from the University of Chicago.

== Academic career ==
Peterson was the principal of a school in Kanab, Utah, from 1899 to 1901, followed by Cassia Academy in Oakley, Idaho, from 1901 to 1904. He was a Fellow at the University of Chicago from 1905 to 1907. He taught psychology at Brigham Young University from 1907 to 1911, where he was a central figure in the 1911 modernism controversy. He was Professor of Psychology at the University of Utah from 1911 to 1915, when he again resigned in protest against a serious institutional curtailment of academic inquiry.

For at the University of Utah in Salt Lake City a similar controversy to BYU's 1911 imbroglio erupted four years later in February 1915. There, the dismissals of two professors and two instructors by President Joseph T. Kingsbury — and the subsequent resignations of 14 faculty members in protest — launched the American Association of University Professors' first institutional academic freedom inquest, spearheaded by AAUP founders Arthur O. Lovejoy and John Dewey. The 1911 BYU controversy — involving some of the same professors, including Joseph Peterson and Ralph V. Chamberlin — led in part to the University of Utah debacle.

As a result of these intertwined academic storms, the AAUP published, in December 1915, its inaugural volume of the Bulletin of the American Association of University Professors, including the document now known as the 1915 Declaration of Principles on Academic Freedom and Academic Tenure — the AAUP's foundational statement on the rights and corresponding obligations of members of the academic profession.

Following his second resignation in four years from a Utah institution of higher education, Peterson taught psychology at University of Minnesota from 1915 to 1918, where he became Chair of the Psychology Department. From 1918 to 1935, he was Professor of Psychology at Peabody College (now part of Vanderbilt University) in Nashville, Tennessee.

During his time at Peabody, Peterson conducted research into race and intelligence. With his former student, Lyle H. Lanier, who by then taught at Vanderbilt University, he co-authored Studies in the comparative abilities of whites and Negroes in 1929. They concluded that "the whites were superior" due to "hereditary differences." Moreover, they added that whites finished their tests more quickly; they concluded this was due to "cultural factors." A review published in the American Journal of Sociology in 1930 suggested, "the results show enormous and statistically reliable superiority of whites over Negroes." [sic] However, in a review for the American Journal of Psychology, Otto Klineberg argued that based on their evidence, he came to a "totally different" interpretation. He stressed the role of environment in mental abilities, as New York City blacks tested higher than Southern blacks. Nevertheless, he added that the study offered "a number of other interesting results which would merit serious discussion."

Peterson was a member of Sigma Xi, the National Research Council and the Society of Experimental Psychologists, as well as a Fellow of the American Association for the Advancement of Science. He served as the president of the Southern Society for Philosophy and Psychology in 1922. A decade later, he served as the president of the American Psychological Association in 1934, becoming first APA president who worked at a Southern university. He was also the editor of Psychological Monographs.

== Death ==
Peterson died of pneumonia on September 20, 1935, in Berkeley, California.
