= David O. Calder =

American journalist

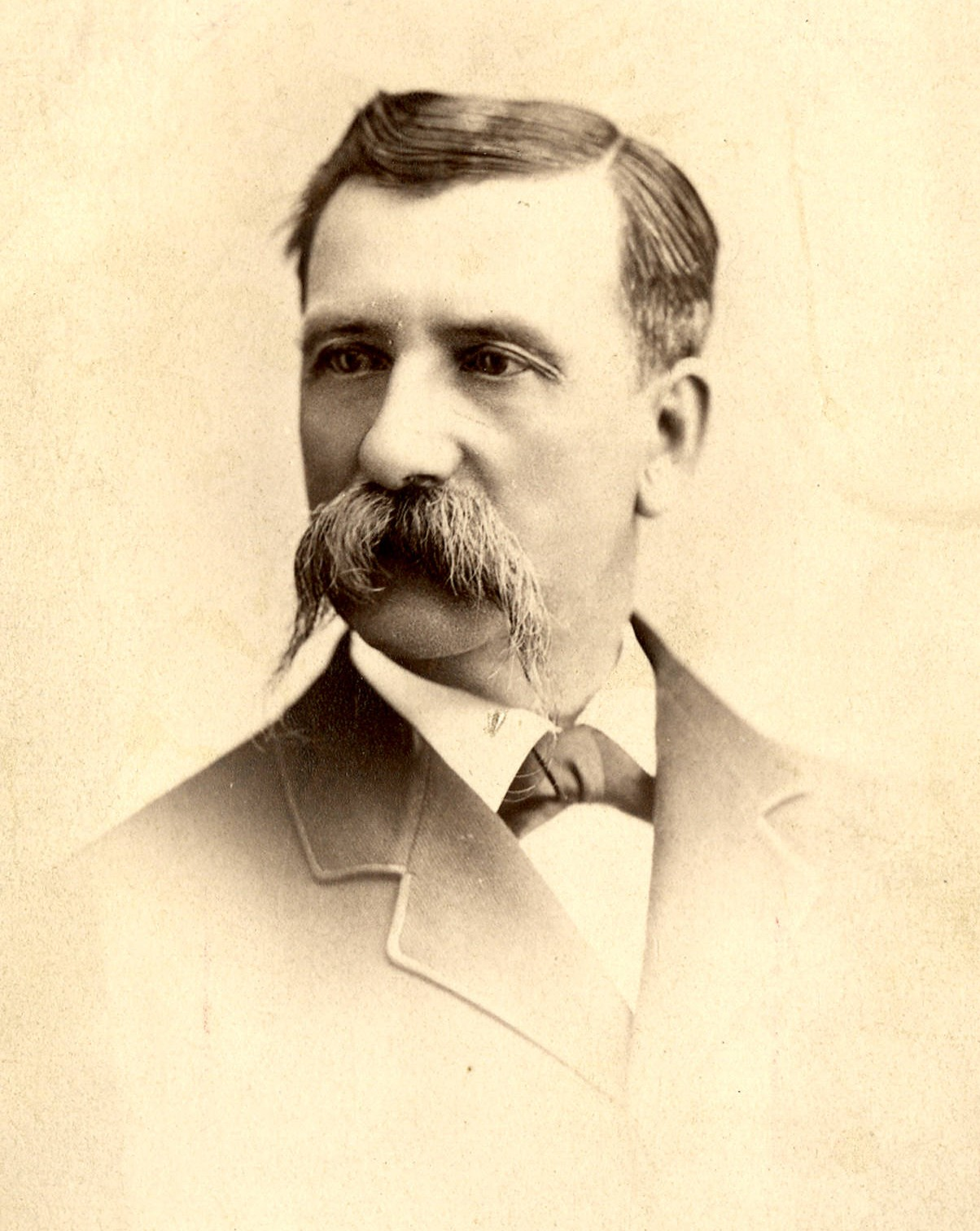
David O. Calder photographed ca. 1870.

David Orson Calder (June 18, 1823 – July 3, 1884) was a prominent early pioneer settler in Utah.

== Biography ==
A native of Thurso, Caithness, Scotland, he joined the Church of Jesus Christ of Latter-day Saints (LDS Church) in 1840, and in 1851 set off for Utah as a Mormon pioneer, accompanied by his widowed mother Anne Johnston Calder, his brother George Calder, and five other siblings. A man of excellent business ability, his talents were quickly recognized. In 1857, he was appointed chief clerk to the Trustee in Trust of The Church of Jesus Christ of Latter-day Saints, and in that position organized a system of accounts and records in all the departments of the church.

Between 1859 and 1870, he held office as Territorial Treasurer of the Utah Territory under Brigham Young. After a visit to his native country, where he also labored as a Mormon missionary, he was chosen business manager and managing editor of the Deseret News, the principal newspaper in Utah at the time, and even today the second-largest newspaper by circulation between Denver and San Francisco. In 1867, Calder was asked by Brigham Young to establish a commercial college in Salt Lake City, which subsequently evolved into one of the components of the University of Utah.

Calder ran the Deseret Musical Association in the late 1850s, which was largely a school teaching children to sing in choruses. This group was highly acclaimed in Utah by such people as Eliza R. Snow.

For part of the 1860s Calder held the monopoly on music supplies in at least Salt Lake City if not all of Utah, as owner of the Calder Music Store in Salt Lake City. He supplied music journals, scores for both classical and popular pieces, and strings, reeds and other necessary aids to playing ones instrument. Calder was also a founding shareholder of the Utah Central Railroad, and was elected a director of Zion's Co-operative Mercantile Institution (ZCMI), widely viewed as the first department store in the United States. He held his director position until his death in July 1884.

Academic offices
Preceded by Orson Spencer	President of the University of Utah; 1867 – 1869	Succeeded by John R. Park
