= John R. Park =

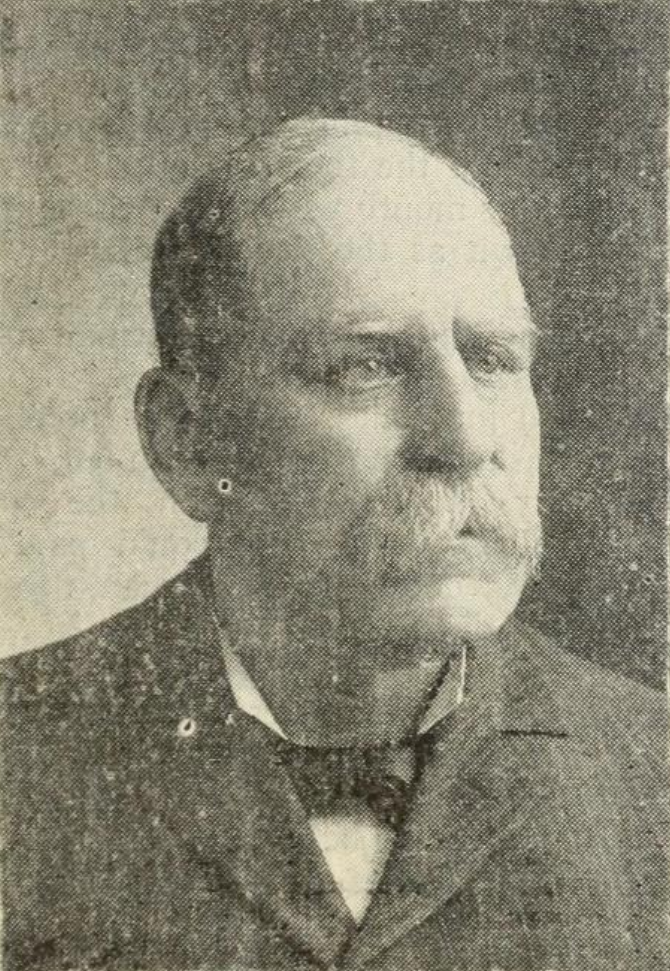

President of the University of Deseret (now the University of Utah)
- In office 1869–1892
- Preceded by: David O. Calder
- Succeeded by: Joseph T. Kingsbury

Personal details
- Born: May 7, 1833 Tiffin, Ohio
- Died: September 30, 1900 (aged 67) Salt Lake City, Utah
- Education: Ohio Wesleyan University; New York University

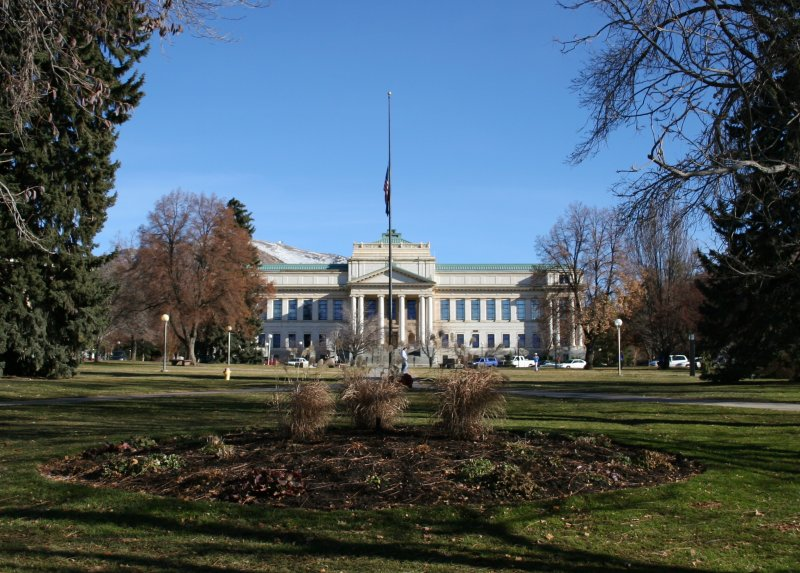
The Park Building at the University of Utah, named after John R. Park

John Rockey Park (May 7, 1833 – September 30, 1900) was a prominent educator in the Territory and State of Utah in the late 19th century, and in many ways was the intellectual father of the University of Utah.

== Educating "intelligent, industrious and moral" citizens ==
There is a statue of John Rockey Park in an alcove just to the left of the west (front) entrance to the University of Utah main administration building which bears his name. There is a plaque fixed to the base of the statue. The plaque lists biographical dates and statistics from Park's life and career, and then repeats the following quote from an 1885 speech he gave to future teachers:

I would have you remember that the best intellectual ability ... will result in worse than failure, unless it has underlying it a stratum of moral culture.

... Always remember in your teaching that the grand purpose of your labors is to make citizens—active, thinking, intelligent, industrious and moral men and women. This you cannot do by any narrow routine of school forms.

—Address to Normal Graduates, Class of 1885

== Childhood, education and early career (1833–1860) ==
Park was born in Tiffin, Ohio. As a young man he worked on his family's farm just outside town and attended Tiffin's public school.

From 1848 to 1850, Park was a student at the Seneca County Academy in the nearby town of Republic, Ohio. While Park studied at the academy, he was fortunate to associate with and learn from Thomas W. Harvey, the academy's principal. Harvey went on to write a number of grammar books, and he became a rather well-known figure in Ohio education history. He was one of several gifted teachers who would have an influence on Park, and by extension, on all of the students Park would teach in his own career as a teacher and teacher trainer.

After completing his preparatory studies, Park went on to graduate from Ohio Wesleyan University.

From 1853 to 1855, Park was employed as a teacher for the first time; he taught at the academy in Republic where he had attended classes as a student.

In 1855, Park entered medical school at New York University where he was a student of the chemist, historian and philosopher, John William Draper. In later life, Park would "gratefully acknowledge" the positive influence that Draper's teaching and friendship had on his life. In 1857, Park received his MD, and he began practicing medicine that same year.

By 1860, Park had decided to leave the practice of medicine. Instead, he ventured out west where (initially at least) he would not always find employment as a teacher.

== Education in Deseret / Utah Territory prior to Park's arrival (1847–1861) ==
In July 1847, fourteen years before Park's arrival, Brigham Young and the first large group of Mormon pioneers arrived in the area which now comprises the state of Utah. In 1849, Young submitted a fairly bold proposal to the U.S. Congress, asking that a large portion of the land which had been ceded to the United States at the end of the Mexican–American War (1846–1848) be admitted to the Union as the State of Deseret. At the time, Congress was consumed with an issue which would eventually only be resolved by the Civil War (1861–1865): whether slavery should be permitted to extend into the western territories. A year and a half after the State of Deseret was proposed, Congress passed the Compromise of 1850. The Compromise reduced the proposed state's borders, renamed it the Utah Territory, and specified that slavery would be permitted in the new territory if the inhabitants voted to permit it.

Utah's Mormon settlers were very different from the "rugged individual" adventurers who would pour into the American West before and after the Civil War. Mormon theology emphasized a kind of "mutual service salvation", and Mormon communities idealized mutual aid to such an extent that they attempted to implement a Christian collectivist economic system called the United Order in the 1830s, very briefly in the 1850s, and again in the 1870s. Also, despite federal efforts to rigorously enforce separation of church and state, the Utah territorial government retained some elements of a theocracy (or, as Joseph Smith had phrased it, a "theodemocracy"). Park's effectiveness as an educator would hinge on his ability to appreciate the benefits of, and to be accepted into, a community that was unique for its time and place.

Education in Utah Territory was similarly shaped by the religious philosophy of its Mormon settlers. Mormons held that "[t]he glory of God is intelligence, or, in other words, light and truth." Like their lax attitude toward separation of church and state, the Mormons did not make great efforts to distinguish between truth received from spiritual revelation or from empirical confirmation. In essence, they were willing to cross the Great Plains and the Rocky Mountains walking beside covered wagons or pulling handcarts so that they could engage in a search for light and truth using methods that valued both secular truth and spiritual truth.

Almost immediately after arriving in the Salt Lake Valley the Latter-day Saints began making plans to ensure that their children received the basics of a secular and religious elementary education. A few weeks after the first crops were planted in the mid-summer of 1847, a school was established. In 1848, Young sent an open letter to those who would soon be emigrating to "Zion", asking them to "improve every opportunity of securing at least a copy of every valuable treatise on education." During the 1850s, local LDS Church meeting houses typically served as schoolhouses for the community's children during the week, and the schools often used Mormon scriptures as supplemental texts. A territorial "Superintendent of Schools" position was created in 1851. However, as the settlers struggled with the realities of frontier life during the 1850s, there just weren't sufficient resources to ensure that schools throughout the Utah Territory taught to uniform standards. So, when Park arrived in 1861, the Territory's schools differed widely in the quality of education they offered.

The settlers started planning for a university almost as quickly as they laid the foundations of an elementary education system. The provisional State of Deseret's General Assembly—consisting of a Senate and a House of Representatives—met for the first time in January 1850. It took just another month or so for the Assembly to pass its eleventh official ordinance and create the University of Deseret (now the University of Utah) on February 28, 1850. The new school officially opened on November 11, 1850. The legislators and regents who founded the university intended for it to be the governing institution supervising all the schools in the proposed State of Deseret; this was a system which the Mormons had attempted to implement while settling Nauvoo, Illinois. The university was to serve primarily at first as a normal school, but its founders also believed that it would soon be a world-class learning institution. Unfortunately, in the early 1850s a significant portion of the Territory's economy was operating solely on barter, and it quickly became apparent that the university would have to wait at least until there was sufficient money in the Territory for students to pay tuition and for the legislature to fund, and not just pass, appropriation bills. In early March 1852, Utah Territory's newly formed legislature rescinded the university's funding. By the time Park arrived in 1861, the university had been closed for almost a decade.

== Frontier schoolteacher (1860–1869) ==
Park came to Utah Territory in 1861 settling in Draper. In 1862, he was baptized a member of the Church of Jesus Christ of Latter-day Saints (LDS Church).

== University president (1869–1892) ==
In 1869, Park became president of the University of Deseret, the predecessor of the University of Utah.

== Community leader and State Superintendent of Public Instruction (1892–1900) ==
In 1895, Park was elected as Utah Superintendent of Education on the Republican ticket. He continued to serve in this position until 1900. He was succeeded by Emma McVicker.

== Personal and family life ==
Park adopted several children as his own, but he never married.

He died at his home in Salt Lake City on September 30, 1900.

== Legacy ==
Upon his death in 1900, Park bequeathed his entire fortune, plus his library, to the University of Utah.

The John R. Park Debate Society at the University of Utah holds his name.

The Draper Park School, in Draper, Utah, near where Park taught school early in his career, is named after him, and is listed on the National Register of Historic Places.

== Notes ==
Academic offices
Preceded by David O. Calder	President of the University of Utah; 1869–1892	Succeeded by Joseph T. Kingsbury
