= A. C. Nelson =

American educator (1864–1913)

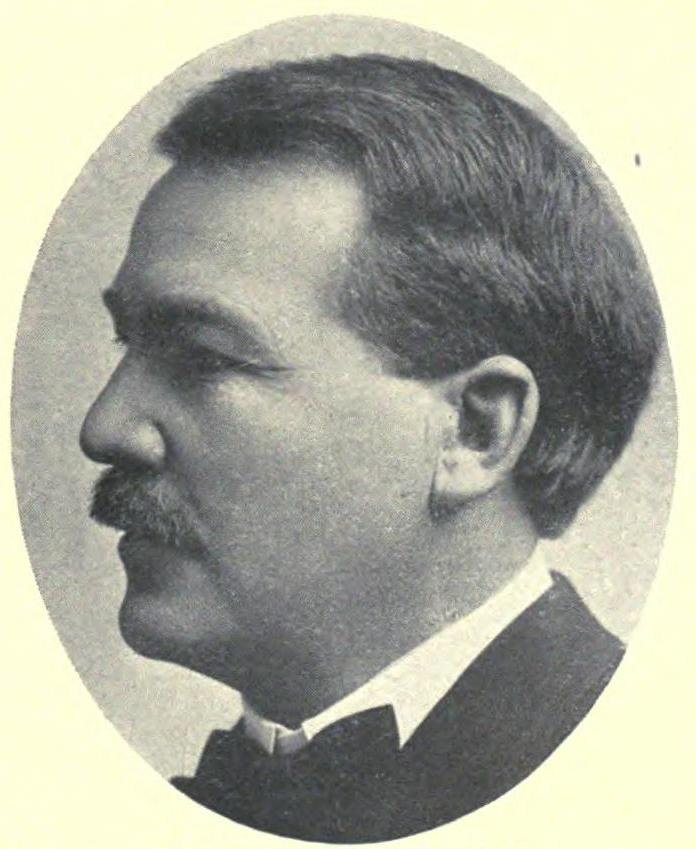
- Born: January 20, 1864
- Died: 1913 (aged 48–49)

Andrew C. Nelson (January 20, 1864 – 1913) was an educator in Utah and for 16 years state superintendent of education. He was also a committed member of the Church of Jesus Christ of Latter-day Saints.

Nelson was raised in Ephraim, Utah and Redmond, Utah. At age 20 he began attending Brigham Young Academy (BYA) in Provo, Utah, with the goal of becoming a school teacher. In 1885 he married Amanda Jensen who was from Ephraim in Manti, Utah. They settled in Koosharem, Utah, where he had his first teaching assignment. He then studied more at BYA and then became supervising teacher of a school in Manti.

From 1901 to 1913, Nelson was state superintendent of education. In 1904 he had to testify before the Reed Smoot heading on the connection between public education and The Church of Jesus Christ of Latter-day Saints in Utah. Nelson died while in office.

== Sources ==
- Report of the State School Superintendent
- Spencer J. Condie. Russell M. Nelson: Father, Surgeon, Apostle. Deseret Book, 2004. Chapter 1.
