= George W. Brimhall =

American politician (1814–1895)

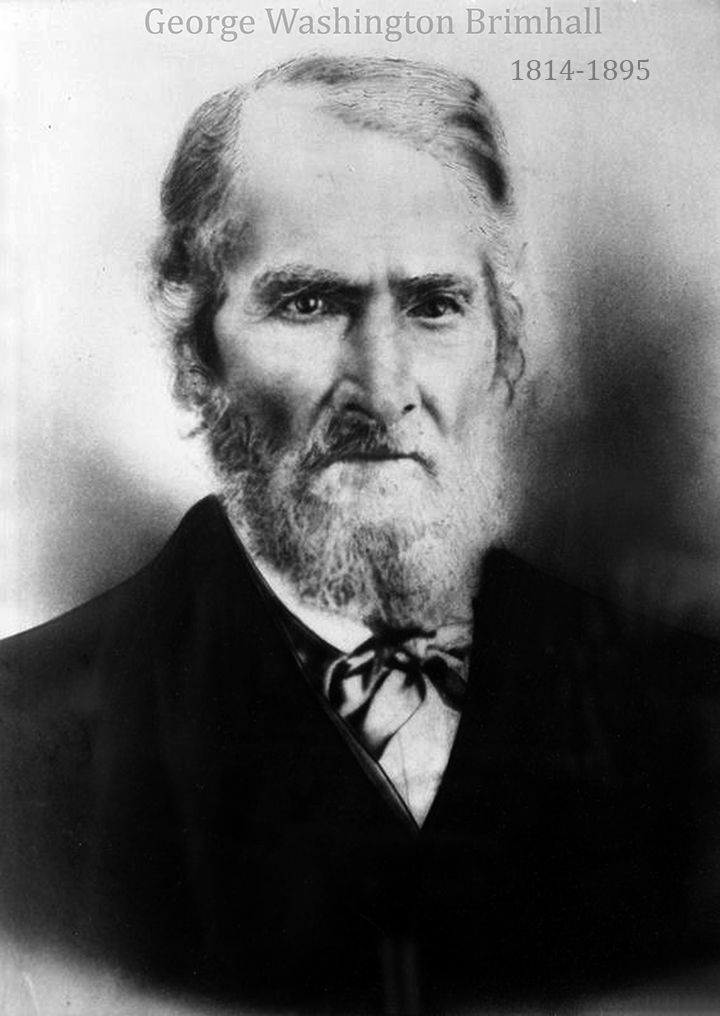

Personal details
- Born: George Washington Brimhall; November 14, 1814; South Trenton, New York, United States
- Died: September 30, 1895 (aged 80); Utah, United States
- Resting place: Spanish Fork City Cemetery; 40.103°N 111.646°W

George Washington Brimhall (November 14, 1814 – September 30, 1895) was a politician in Utah Territory. He was the father of George H. Brimhall.

Brimhall was the son of Sylvanus Brimhall and his wife the former Lydia Ann Guiteau. He was born along Canada Creek in the state of New York. In 1827, the family moved to Olean Point, New York and a short time later to Melville, Cattaraugus County, New York. After cutting and milling lumber at this location, the Brimhalls loaded it into a boat, went down the Allegany River to Pittsburgh and sold it, and then went down the Ohio to Dearborn County, Indiana. In 1837, Brimhall moved with his family to McHenry County, Illinois.

Brimhall joined the Church of Jesus Christ of Latter Day Saints in McHenry County in 1842. He spent the next two years as a Mormon missionary in McHenry and surrounding counties and then moved to Nauvoo, Illinois, in March 1844. Shortly afterwards, he moved to Knoxville, Illinois, where he met Lucretia Metcalf, whom he married in July 1845. Lucretia was opposed to going west with the Mormons. Brimhall hoped if he went to Utah he would be able to persuade her to come and join him with their two children. She refused. He left her in Illinois in 1850 and married his second wife in 1852 in Utah. Lucretia filed for divorce on the grounds of abandonment in late 1852 and remarried Elijah Beach in July 1853.

Brimhall was sent to Iron County, Utah, in 1850 as part of the Iron Mission, one of the efforts coordinated by Brigham Young to facilitate the growth of Utah Territory's economy. In 1852, Brimhall was elected to the Utah Territorial Legislature, where he served for three terms. Early that year he married Rachel Ann Meyer.

In 1854, Brimhall moved to Ogden where he served on the City Council for three years.

Brimhall moved to Salt Lake City in 1863. In 1864, he was called to be part of the mission that settled St. George and vicinity. Brimhall later moved to Spanish Fork, where he lived until the time of his death.

Brimhall and his wife Rachel were the parents of ten children. He served for many years as a patriarch of the Utah Stake, which then included all of Utah County. He held this position at the time of his death.
