= Joseph B. Keeler =

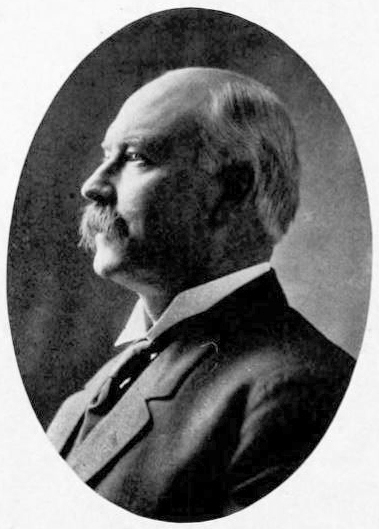
Joseph B. Keeler in 1911

Joseph Brigham Keeler (September 8, 1855 – December 21, 1935) was an American teacher and administrator at Brigham Young Academy (BYA) and then Brigham Young University (BYU). He was for a time a counselor to George H. Brimhall when the school had a presidency similar to other LDS Church Presidencies (see for example First Presidency with a president and two counselors).

== Early life ==
Keeler was born in Salt Lake City, to the stonemason Daniel Keeler. The elder Keeler had been born in New Jersey and worked as a stonemason in New York City and Philadelphia. After he came to Nauvoo in 1840 he was a stone Mason for the Nauvoo Temple.

When Joseph was two his family moved to Provo to avoid the anticipated destruction of Salt Lake by Johnston's Army. When a peace was negotiated most people returned north but the Keelers remained in Provo. Joseph initially followed the building trade as did his father. He assisted in building the Old Provo Tabernacle and in 1874-1875 was sent as a missionary to assist in building the St. George Temple. In 1873-1874 Keeler had been a student at the Timpanogos Branch of the University of Deseret (headed by William Dusenberry and Warren Dusenberry).

Keeler was one of the original students at the BYA when it opened in 1875. He graduated from BYA in 1880 and then became editor of the Provo Enquirer. He held this position for less than a year and then served for two years as a missionary in the Southern States Mission of the LDS Church.

== Family ==
In 1883 Keeler married Martha Alice Fairbanks. They eventually became the parents of ten children. Martha like her husband was active in the LDS Church and was involved in the writing of the First Relief Society Manual.

Prior to joining the BYA faculty in 1884 Keeler was County Recorder for Utah County and city assessor for Provo. Keeler was scheduled to begin work at BYA the day after the Lewis Building (which he had been one of the builders of) burned to the ground. Keeler later went to Poughkeepsie, New York where he received a Master of Accounts degree from Eastman Business College.

== Career ==
Keeler was the main person behind the establishment of the first BYA boarding house. In 1888 he was described as being the First Counselor to Karl G. Maeser. Keeler taught theology courses at BYA and later BYU. Keeler wrote a book on the Aaronic Priesthood which in 1904 was used as the first Aaronic Priesthood manual in the LDS Church, Foundation Stones of the Earth, A Concordance of the Doctrine and Covenants, The Student's Guide to Bookkeeping and also a book entitled First Steps in Church Government. In 1902 Keeler wrote a pamphlet entitled The Bishop's Court which provided for the standardization of procedures and was a key step in moving LDS bishops out of matters that were felt to be civil in nature. Forms from this book were still being recommended for use in official Church publications in 1939. Keeler was also an outspoken opponent of biological evolution.

Keeler was closely connected with both the Religion Classes and the YMMIA. He was involved with the organization of the first Religion Class, a program that was later merged with the primary. He also served was for many years part of the Utah Stake YMMIA presidency and was its president from 1893 to 1895. At that time Utah Stake covered all of Utah County.

From 1895 to 1901 Keeler was bishop of the Provo 4th Ward. In 1901 Keeler became first counselor to David John in the presidency of the Utah Stake, which had been reduced to just the city of Provo. Keeler became president of the Utah Stake in 1908. Keeler remained the president of the Utah Stake until 1919 when he was succeeded by Thomas N. Taylor.

Keeler remained on the faculty of BYU until his retirement May 1920. He was dean of BYU's business college from 1904 to 1920. In 1921 Keeler was ordained a patriarch for the Utah Stake by James E. Talmage.

== Sources ==
- bio of Keeler
- David J. Whitaker. "Joseph Keeler, Print Culture and the Modernization of Mormonism, 1885-1918 in Charles L. Cohen. Religion and the Culture of Print in Modern America (Madison: University of Wisconsin Press, 2008) p. 105-121
- Biography connected with Keeler's papers in BYU special collections
- Andrew Jenson. LDS Biographical Encyclopedia. Vol. 2, p. 770.
