= Mormon views on evolution =

The Church of Jesus Christ of Latter-day Saints (LDS Church) takes no official position on whether or not biological evolution has occurred, nor on the validity of the modern evolutionary synthesis as a scientific theory. In the twentieth century, the First Presidency of the LDS Church published doctrinal statements on the origin of man and creation. In addition, individual leaders of the church have expressed a variety of personal opinions on evolution, many of which have affected the beliefs and perceptions of Latter-day Saints.

There have been three public statements from the First Presidency (1909, 1910, 1925) and one private statement from the First Presidency (1931) about the LDS Church's view on evolution. The 1909 statement was a delayed response to the publication of On the Origin of Species by Charles Darwin. In the statement, the First Presidency affirmed their doctrine that Adam is the direct, divine offspring of God. In response to the 1911 Brigham Young University modernism controversy, the First Presidency issued an official statement in its 1910 Christmas message that the church members should be kind to everyone regardless of differences in opinion about evolution and that proven science is accepted by the church with joy. In 1925, in response to the Scopes Trial, the First Presidency published a statement, similar in content to the 1909 statement, but with "anti-science" language removed. A private memo written in 1931 by the First Presidency to church general authorities confirmed a neutral stance on the existence of pre-Adamites and "death before the fall." It further asserted that geology, biology, and other sciences were best left to scientists (and implicitly, not theologians), and were not central to church teachings.

There are a variety of LDS Church publications that address evolution, often with neutral or opposing viewpoints. In order to address students' questions about the church's position on evolution in biology and related classes, Brigham Young University (BYU) released a library packet on evolution in 1992. This packet contains the first three official First Presidency statement as well as the "Evolution" section in the Encyclopedia of Mormonism to supplement normal course material. Statements from church presidents are mixed with some vehemently against evolution and the theories of Charles Darwin, and some willing to admit that the circumstances of earth's creation are unknown and that evolution could explain some aspects of creation. In the 1930s, church leaders Joseph Fielding Smith, B. H. Roberts, and James E. Talmage debated about the existence of pre-Adamites, eliciting a memo from the First Presidency in 1931 claiming a neutral stance on pre-Adamites.

Since the publication of On the Origin of Species, some Latter-day Saint scientists have published essays or speeches to try and reconcile science and Mormon doctrine. Many of these scientists subscribe to the idea that evolution is the natural process God used to create the Earth and its inhabitants and that there are commonalities between Mormon doctrine and foundations of evolutionary biology. Debate and questioning among members of the LDS Church continues concerning evolution, religion, and the reconciliation between the two. Although articles from publications like BYU Studies often represent neutral or pro-evolutionary stances, LDS-sponsored publications such as the Ensign tend to publish articles with anti-evolutionary views. Studies published since 2014 have found that the majority of Latter-day Saints do not believe humans evolved over time. A 2018 study in the Journal of Contemporary Religion found that very liberal or moderate members of the LDS Church were more likely to accept evolution as their education level increased, whereas very conservative members were less likely to accept evolution as their education level increased. Another 2018 study found that over time, Latter-day Saint undergraduate attitudes towards evolution have changed from antagonistic to accepting. The researchers attributed this attitude change to more primary school exposure to evolution and a reduction in the number of anti-evolution statements from the First Presidency.

== Official doctrine ==
The LDS Church has no official position on the theory of evolution or the details of "what happened on earth before Adam and Eve, including how their bodies were created." Even so, some church general authorities have made statements suggesting that, in their opinion, evolution is opposed to scriptural teaching. Apostles Joseph Fielding Smith and Bruce R. McConkie were among the most well-known advocates of this position. Other church authorities and members have made statements suggesting that, in their opinion, evolution is not in opposition to scriptural doctrine. Examples of this position have come from B. H. Roberts, James E. Talmage, and John A. Widtsoe.

While maintaining its "no position" stance, the LDS Church has produced a number of official publications that have included discussion and personal statements from these various church leaders on evolution and the "origin of man." These statements generally adopt the position, as a church-approved encyclopedia entry (Note: The entry on evolution in the Encyclopedia of Mormonism was approved by apostles Neal A. Maxwell and Dallin H. Oaks.) states, "[t]he scriptures tell why man was created, but they do not tell how, though the Lord has promised that he will tell that when he comes again."

=== First Presidency statements ===
There have been three authoritative public statements (1909, 1910, and 1925) and one private statement (1931) given from the LDS Church's highest authority, the First Presidency, which represents the church's doctrinal position on the origin of mankind. The 1909 and 1925 statements of the First Presidency have been subsequently endorsed by church leaders such as apostle Boyd K. Packer in 1988.

In February 2002, the entire 1909 First Presidency message was reprinted in the church's Ensign magazine.

==== 1909 statement "The Origin of Man" ====
Historically, Latter-day Saints were isolated in the western plains when The Origin of Species was published by Charles Darwin in 1859. Consequently, there was little discussion about evolution among Mormon communities. The Latter-day Saints were trying to survive and build settlements in Utah and evolution was not a prominent concern for them. George Q. Cannon of the Quorum of the Twelve discussed his beliefs on Darwin in 1861, stating that revelation is superior to science, but considered the possibility of evolution among animals and plants. The building of the transcontinental railroad in 1869 allowed for the Saints to gain greater access to outside ideas and influences. Because of this new knowledge, Mormon schools sought to combat scientific theories such as evolution with faith. Publications helped reaffirm church doctrine; however, views on evolution were mixed. Some believed a belief in evolution was equivalent to atheism, whereas some sought to find common ground between evolution and faith. Due to the many differing opinions that emerged, in the early 1900s the LDS Church began to officially respond to the theories that had already been discussed for nearly fifty years.

The first official statement from the First Presidency on the issue of evolution was in November 1909, the centennial of Darwin's birth, and the 50th anniversary of the publication of On the Origin of Species. Church president Joseph F. Smith appointed a committee headed by Orson F. Whitney, a member of Quorum of the Twelve, to prepare an official statement, "basing its belief on divine revelation, ancient and modern, proclaim[ing] man to be the direct and lineal offspring of Deity." This teaching regarding the origin of man differs from traditional Christianity's doctrine of creation, referred to by some as "creationism", which consists of belief in a fiat creation. One author said the statement's wording wasn't "outright denying evolutionary claims", but "presented a clear anti-evolutionary slant", and a BYU columnist described the 1909 statement as "anti-evolution" and anti-science.

In reference to potential humans before Adam the First Presidency stated, "It is held by some that Adam was not the first man upon this earth and that the original human being was a development from lower orders of the animal creation. These, however, are the theories of men. The word of the Lord declared that Adam was 'the first man of all men' ... and we are therefore in duty bound to regard him as the primal parent of our race. ...[A]ll men were created in the beginning after the image of God ... Man began life as a human being, in the likeness of our Heavenly Father." Moreover, it stated that although man begins life as a germ or embryo, it did not mean that, "[Adam] began life as anything less than a man, or less than the human germ or embryo that becomes a man".

==== 1910 statement "Words in Season from the First Presidency" ====
In response to continual questions from church members regarding evolution, as well as problems preceding the 1911 Brigham Young University modernism controversy, in its 1910 Christmas message, the First Presidency made reference to the church's position on science. It stated that the church is not hostile to "real science" and that "diversity of opinion does not necessitate intolerance of spirit". The message continues by stating that "real science" which is demonstrated is accepted with joy, but theories, speculation, or anything contrary to revelation or common sense are not accepted.

==== 1925 statement "Mormon View of Evolution" ====
In 1925, in the midst of the Scopes Trial in Tennessee, a new First Presidency issued an official statement which reaffirmed the doctrine that Adam was the first man upon the earth and that he was created in the image of God. There is a short article in the Encyclopedia of Mormonism which is largely composed of quotes from the 1909 and 1925 statements. It states that men and women are created in the image of the "universal Father and Mother", and Adam, like Christ was a pre-existing spirit who took a body to become a "living soul". It continues by stating that because man is "endowed with divine attributes", he "is capable, by experience through ages and aeons, of evolving into a God." The official statement was initially published in Deseret News on July 18, 1925, and later published in the Improvement Era in September 1925. The 1925 statement is shorter than the 1909 statement, containing selected excerpts from the 1909 statement. "Anti-science" language was removed and the title was altered from "The Origin of Man" to "Mormon View of Evolution". The comment which concluded that theories of evolution are "theories of men" in the 1909 official statement was no longer included in the 1925 official statement. The First Presidency has not publicly issued an official statement on evolution since 1925.

==== 1931 statement "First Presidency Minutes" ====
In April 1931, the First Presidency sent out a lengthy memo to all church general authorities in response to the debate between B. H. Roberts of the Presidency of the Seventy and Joseph Fielding Smith of the Quorum of the Twelve on the existence of pre-Adamites. The memo stated the church's neutral stance on the existence of pre-Adamites.

== Official church publications ==
The subject of evolution has been addressed in several official publications of the church.

=== General conference speeches ===
The LDS Church has published several general conference talks mentioning evolution. In the October 1984 conference, apostle Boyd K. Packer stated that "no one with reverence for God could believe that His children evolved from slime or from reptiles" as well as affirming that "those who accept the theory of evolution don't show much enthusiasm for genealogical research." In the April 2012 conference, apostle Russell M. Nelson discussed the human body stating "some people erroneously think that these marvelous physical attributes happened by chance or resulted from a big bang somewhere". He then compared this to an "explosion in a printing shop produc[ing] a dictionary".

=== Instruction manuals ===
==== Old Testament Student Seminary Manual ====
The Old Testament Student Manual, published by the Church Educational System, contains several quotes by general authorities as well as academics from a variety of backgrounds (both members of the church and non-members) related to organic evolution and the origins of the earth. The 2003 edition states that there is no official stance on the age of the earth but that evidence for a longer process is substantial and very few people believe the earth was actually created in the space of one week. However, it also includes a quote from Joseph Fielding Smith indicating his interpretation of church doctrine as it pertains to the theory of organic evolution. He asserts that organic evolution is incompatible and inconsistent with revelations from God and that to accept it is to reject the plan of salvation.

==== Doctrine and Covenants and Church History Seminary Teacher Manual ====
Doctrine and Covenants mentions "the seven thousand years of [the earth's] continuance, or its temporal existence", which has been interpreted by Joseph Fielding Smith and Bruce R. McConkie as a statement suggesting that the earth is no more than about six thousand years old (the seventh thousand-year period being the future millennium). (Note: Joseph Fielding Smith: "We have evidence beyond dispute that Adam was driven out of the Garden of Eden about 6,000 years ago, or perhaps a short time less. ... In [Doctrine and Covenants] section 77:6–15, we have more information in relation to the opening of these seals [i.e., the seven seals mentioned in the Book of Revelation], with the following significant detail: 'Q. What are we to understand by the book which John saw, which was sealed on the back with seven seals? A. We are to understand that it contains the revealed will, mysteries, and works of God; the hidden things of his economy concerning this earth during the seven thousand years of its continuance, or its temporal existence.'") Speciation generally occurs over very large spans of time.

However, in relation to this verse, the manual for seminary teachers explains: "It may be helpful to explain that the 7,000 years refers to the time since the Fall of Adam and Eve. It is not referring to the actual age of the earth including the periods of creation."

==== BYU Library packet on evolution ====
Since 1992 at the LDS-owned universities, a packet of authoritative statements approved by the BYU Board of Trustees (composed of the First Presidency, other general authorities, and general organizational leaders) has been provided to students in classes when discussing the topic of organic evolution. The packet was assembled due to the large number of questions students had about evolution and the origins of man and is intended to be distributed along with other course material. The packet includes the first three Official First Presidency statements on the origin of man as well as the "Evolution" section in the Encyclopedia of Mormonism which includes elements from the 1909 and 1925 statements as well as the 1931 "First Presidency Minutes".

=== Official magazines ===
==== Ensign ====
In 1982, the Ensign, an official periodical of the church, published an article entitled "Christ and the Creation" by Bruce R. McConkie, which stated that "[m]ortality and procreation and death all had their beginnings with the Fall." In an earlier edition of the Ensign published in 1980, McConkie stated that "the greatest heresy in the sectarian world ... is that God is a spirit nothingness which fills the immensity of space, and that creation came through evolutionary processes."

==== New Era ====
A July 2016 article for young adults in the New Era acknowledged questions about how the age of the earth, dinosaurs, and evolution fit with church teachings, stating "it does all fit together, but there are still a lot of questions." The article offered no further explanation to how science and LDS teachings fit together, and stated "nothing that science reveals can disprove your faith" and told youth "not to get worried in the meantime."

A few months later in the same magazine, the church published an anonymously authored article stating that "the Church has no official position of the theory of evolution." The article continues by stating that the theory of organic evolution should be left for scientific study and that details about the what happened before Adam and Eve and how their bodies were created have not been revealed, but the origin of man is clear from the teaching of the church.

A much earlier anonymously authored article from 2004 did not attempt to reconcile church teachings and scientific views of evolution, but stated that not having the answers does not discredit the existence of God, and that God will not reveal more unto us until we prove our faith. An example was provided of how the author avoided a classroom debate on evolution by stating that they knew God existed and created us. The article also quoted past church president Gordon B. Hinckley giving his own example of how he chose to drop the question and not let it bother him. Subsequent letters from youth stated that the youth viewed themselves as against evolution and supportive of intelligent design. A previous article in the New Era also showed youth viewing evolution as an antagonistic idea to their faith and becoming upset when it was taught and another featured a church seventy using scientific arguments in an attempt to disprove evolutionary natural selection and adaptation.

==== Improvement Era ====
The Improvement Era was an official periodical of the church between 1897 and 1970. In the April 1910 edition in the "Priesthood Quorum's Table" section of that periodical, Genesis is cited as well as other scriptures from Genesis and the Pearl of Great Price. The article states that it is unclear whether the mortal bodies of man evolved through natural processes, whether Adam and Eve where transplanted to Earth from another place, or whether they were born on Earth in mortality. The article states that those questions are not fully answered in the church's current revelation and scripture. The article cites the answer is attributed to the church's First Presidency.

=== Canonized scriptures ===
Some verses in the standard works raise questions about the compatibility of scriptural teachings and scientists' current understanding of organic evolution. One such verse, in Doctrine and Covenants describes the "temporal existence" of the earth as 7,000 years old.

Other scriptural verses suggest that no organisms died before the fall of Adam. In the Book of Mormon, the prophet Lehi teaches: "If Adam had not transgressed he would not have fallen, but he would have remained in the garden of Eden. And all things which were created must have remained in the same state in which they were after they were created; and they must have remained forever, and had no end". In Moses in the Pearl of Great Price, the prophet Enoch states: "Because that Adam fell, we are; and by his fall came death; and we are made partakers of misery and woe."

=== Bible Dictionary ===
In the Bible Dictionary of the LDS Church, the entry for "Fall of Adam" previously included the following statement: "Before the fall, Adam and Eve had physical bodies but no blood. There was no sin, no death, and no children among any of the earthly creations." Under the entry "Flesh", it is written: "Since flesh often means mortality, Adam is spoken of as the 'first flesh' upon the earth, meaning he was the first mortal on the earth, all things being created in a non-mortal condition, and becoming mortal through the fall of Adam.

As noted above, the Bible Dictionary is published by the LDS Church, and its preface states: "It [the Bible Dictionary] is not intended as an official or revealed endorsement by the church of the doctrinal, historical, cultural, and other matters set forth."

== Statements from church presidents ==
Every statement by an LDS Church president does not necessarily constitute official church doctrine, but a statement from him is generally regarded by church membership as authoritative and usually represents doctrine. Official church doctrine is however presented and taught unitedly by the entire First Presidency, usually released in an official letter or other authorized publication.

=== Brigham Young ===
Brigham Young, the church's second president, stated that the LDS Church differs from other Christian churches, because they do not seek to clash their ideas with scientific theory. He further stated that whether God began with an empty Earth, whether he created the Earth out of nothing, and whether he made it in six days or millions of years will remain a mystery unless God reveals something about it. Two years later Young also stated it was unjust that the theories of scientists were taught in schools, but not the principles of the gospel, and hoped in the future to have schools teach from curriculum written by members of his church that taught church doctrine. He wrote to his son stating that he'd created Brigham Young Academy in part because of his opposition to the theory of evolution, and was "resolutely and uncompromisingly opposed" to "the theories...of Darwin."

=== John Taylor ===
John Taylor was the second church president to comment directly on Darwinian theory. In his 1882 book Mediation and Atonement, Taylor stated that nature and creation is governed by the laws of man and organisms exist in the same form since creation, as contradicted by the ideas of evolutionists. Taylor continued that man did not originate from chaos of matter, but from "the faculties and powers of a God".

=== Joseph F. Smith ===
Soon after the First Presidency's 1909 statement, Joseph F. Smith professed in an editorial that "the Church itself has no philosophy about the modus operandi employed by the Lord in His creation of the world." However, in the very same month (and in the wake of the evolution controversy that had recently ensued at Brigham Young University), Smith published and signed a statement wherein he explained some of the conflicts between revealed religion and the theories of evolution. He cited the 1911 Brigham Young University modernism controversy, stating that evolution is in conflict with scriptures and modern revelation. He continues that the church holds that "divine revelation" must be the "standard" and is "truth". Smith mentions that "science has changed from age to age", and "philosophic theories of life" have their place, but do not belong in LDS Church school classes and anywhere else when they contradict the word of God.

A 1910 editorial in a church magazine that enumerates various possibilities for creation is usually attributed to Smith or to the First Presidency. Included in the listed possibilities were the ideas that Adam and Eve: (1) "evolved in natural processes to present perfection"; (2) were "transplanted [to earth] from another sphere"; or (3) were "born here ... as other mortals have been." Smith authored an editorial the next year in the church magazine discouraging the discussion of evolution in church school stating that members of the church believe the theory of evolution was "more or less a fallacy."

=== David O. McKay ===
In a 1952 speech to students at BYU, McKay used the theory of evolution as an example while suggesting that science can "leave [a student] with his soul unanchored." He stated that a professor that denies "divine agency in creation" imposes on the student that life was created by chance. McKay insisted that students should be led to a "counterbalancing thought" that "God is the Creator of the earth", "the Father of our souls and spirits", and "the purpose of creation is theirs (God and Jesus Christ)." In the April 1968 general conference, McKay's son, David, read a message on his father's behalf that was an edited version of the 1952 speech, including the omission of the word "beautiful" when describing the theory of evolution. In 1954, McKay quoted the Old Testament while affirming to members of the BYU faculty that living things only reproduce "after their kind". He quoted Genesis which states, "Let the earth bring forth the living creatures after his kind, cattle and creeping things, and the beast of the earth after his kind."

=== Spencer W. Kimball ===
At a 1975 church women's conference, church president Spencer W. Kimball quoted, "And, I God created man in mine own image, and in the image of mine Only Begotten created I him; male and female created I them." (Kimball added that "the story of the rib, of course, is figurative.") Kimball continued, "we don't know exactly how [Adam and Eve's] coming into this world happened, and when we're able to understand it the Lord will tell us."

=== Ezra Taft Benson ===
Prior to becoming president of the LDS Church, Ezra Taft Benson gave an April 1981 general conference address in which he stated that "the theory of man's development from lower forms of life" is a "false idea". In 1988, after becoming president of the church, Benson published a book counseling members of the church to use the Book of Mormon to counter the theories of evolution. He wrote that "we have not been using the Book of Mormon as we should. Our homes are not as strong unless we are using it to bring our children to Christ. Our families may be corrupted by worldly trends and teachings unless we know how to use the book to expose and combat the falsehoods in socialism, organic evolution, rationalism, humanism, etc." In 1988, Benson published another book that included his earlier warnings about the "deceptions" of Charles Darwin. He wrote that educational institutions serve to mislead youth, which explains—he noted—why the church advises that youth attend church institutions, allowing parents to closely observe the education of their children and clear up "the deceptions of men like . . . Charles Darwin.

=== Gordon B. Hinckley ===
In a 1997 speech at an Institute of Religion in Ogden, Utah, church president Gordon B. Hinckley said: "People ask me every now and again if I believe in evolution. I tell them I am not concerned with organic evolution. I do not worry about it. I passed through that argument long ago." wherein he contrasts "organic evolution" with the evolution and improvement of individuals: In the late 1990s, Hinckley recalled his university studies of anthropology and geology to reporter Larry A. Witham: "'Studied all about it. Didn't worry me then. Doesn't worry me now'", insisting that the church only requires the belief that Adam was the first man of '"what we would call the human race."' In 2004, an official church magazine printed a quote from Hinckley from a 1983 speech where he expressed a similar sentiment.

== Statements from apostles ==
In the early 1900s, many general authorities, specifically those with science backgrounds, subscribed to the idea of an old earth, yet most of them rejected Darwinism. Joseph Fielding Smith and other general authorities were against the old earth theory as well as Darwin's theory of evolution. Individual leaders of the church have expressed a variety of personal opinions on biological evolution and as such these do not necessarily constitute official church doctrine.

=== Statements from the 1930s Roberts–Smith–Talmage dispute ===
In 1930, B. H. Roberts, the presiding member of the First Council of the Seventy, was assigned by the First Presidency to create a study manual for the Melchizedek priesthood holders of the church. Entitled The Truth, The Way, The Life, the draft of the manual that was submitted to the First Presidency and the Quorum of the Twelve Apostles for approval stated that death had been occurring on Earth for millions of years prior to the fall of Adam and that human-like pre-Adamites had lived on the Earth.

On 5 April 1930, Joseph Fielding Smith, a junior member of the Quorum of the Twelve Apostles and the son of a late church president, "vigorously promulgated [the] opposite point of view" in a speech that was published in a church magazine. In his widely read speech, Smith taught as doctrine that there had been no death on earth until after the fall of Adam and that there were no "pre-Adamites".

In 1931, both Roberts and Smith were permitted to present their views to the First Presidency and the Quorum of the Twelve. After hearing both sides, the First Presidency issued a memo to the general authorities of the church which stated while they agree with the idea that "Adam is the primal parent of our race", there is no advantage to continuing the discussion and that church members should focus on "[bearing] the message of the restored gospel to the people of the world" and that those sciences do not have anything to do with, "the salvation of the souls of mankind". They stated that continuation of the discussion would only lead to "confusion, division, and misunderstanding if continued further."

Another of the apostles, geologist James E. Talmage, pointed out that Smith's views could be misinterpreted as the church's official position, since Smith's views were widely circulated in a church magazine but Roberts's views were limited to an internal church document. As a result, the First Presidency gave permission to Talmage to give a speech promoting views that were contrary to Smith's. In his speech on August 9, 1931, in the Salt Lake Tabernacle, Talmage taught the same principles that Roberts had originally outlined in his draft manual. Over Smith's objections, the First Presidency authorized a church publication of Talmage's speech in pamphlet form.

In 1965, Talmage's speech was reprinted again by the church in an official church magazine. As Talmage points out in the article, "The outstanding point of difference ... is the point of time which man in some state has lived on this planet." With regards to evolution in general, Talmage challenged many of its aspects in the same speech. He said that he does not believe Adam descended from cavemen or lower forms of men, but is divinely created. He did, however, state that were it true that Adam evolved from lower form, it only seems likely that men will continue to evolve into something higher as a part of eternal progression. He continued by stating that, "evolution is true so far as it means development, and progress, and advancement in all the works of God", and that the scriptures, "should not be discredited by theories of men; they cannot be discredited by fact and truth." Talmage considered the possibility of pre-Adamites; however, he denied speciation and evolution. Roberts died in 1933 and The Truth, The Way, The Life remained unpublished until 1994, when it was published by an independent publisher.

Although it is apparent that Roberts and Smith may have had differing views on whether there was death before the fall of Adam, it is evident that they may have had similar views against organic evolution as the explanation for the origin of man. For example, Roberts wrote that "the theory of evolution as advocated by many modern scientists lies stranded upon the shore of idle speculation. There is one other objection to be urged against the theory of evolution before leaving it; it is contrary to the revelations of God." Roberts further criticized the theories of evolution by stating that Darwin's claims of evolution are contrary to the experience and knowledge of man, because the law of nature requires that every organism reproduces of its own kind, and while variation may occur, changes usually revert due to extinction, chromosomal infertility, or by reversion to original species.

=== Joseph Fielding Smith ===
In 1954, when he was President of the Quorum of the Twelve Apostles, Smith wrote at length about his personal views on evolution in his book Man, His Origin and Destiny stating that it was a destructive and contaminating influence and that "If the Bible does not kill Evolution, Evolution will kill the Bible." He further stated that "There is not and cannot be, any compromise between the Gospel of Jesus Christ and the theories of evolution" and that "It is not possible for a logical mind to hold both Bible teaching and evolutionary teaching at the same time" since "If you accept [the scriptures] you cannot accept organic evolution." In response to an inquiry about the book from the head of the University of Utah Geology Department, church president David O. McKay affirmed that "the Church has officially taken no position" on evolution, Smith's book "is not approved by the Church", and that the book is entirely Smith's "views for which he alone is responsible". Smith also produced personal statements on evolution in his Doctrines of Salvation including that "If evolution is true, the church is false" since "If life began on Earth as advocated by Darwin ... then the doctrines of the church are false". Smith stated about his views on evolution, "No Adam, no fall; no fall, no atonement; no atonement, no savior." Smith also asserted that "There was no death of any living creature before the fall of Adam! Adam's mission was to bring to pass the fall and it came upon the earth and living things throughout all nature. Anything contrary to this doctrine is diametrically opposed to the doctrines revealed to the Church! If there was any creature increasing by propagation before the fall, then throw away the Book of Mormon, deny your faith, the Book of Abraham and the revelations in the Doctrine and Covenants! Our scriptures most emphatically tell us that death came through the fall, and has passed upon all creatures including the earth itself. For this earth of ours was pronounced good when the Lord finished it. It became fallen and subject to death as did all things upon its face, through the transgression of Adam."

=== Bruce R. McConkie ===
Bruce R. McConkie was an influential church leader and author on the topic of evolution, having been published several times speaking strongly on the topic. He stated his view in 1982 at BYU that there was no death in the world for Adam or for any form of life before the fall, and that trying to reconcile religion and organic evolution was a false and devilish heresy among church members. In 1984, McConkie disparaged the "evolutionary fantasies of biologists" and stated that yet to be revealed "doctrines will completely destroy the whole theory of organic evolution" and stated that any religion that assumes humans are a product of evolution cannot offer salvation since true believers know humans were made in a state in which there was no procreation or death. In his popular and controversial reference book Mormon Doctrine, McConkie devoted ten pages to his entry on evolution.

After canvassing statements of past church leaders, the standard works, and the 1909 First Presidency statement, McConkie concluded that "[t]here is no harmony between the truths of revealed religion and the theories of organic evolution." The evolution entry in Mormon Doctrine quotes extensively from Smith's Man, His Origin and Destiny. (Note: McConkie was Smith's son-in-law and the two had largely compatible doctrinal views.) McConkie characterized the intellect of those Latter-day Saints who believe in evolution while simultaneously having knowledge of church doctrines on life and creation as "scrubby and grovelling". McConkie included a disclaimer in Mormon Doctrine stating that he alone was responsible for the doctrinal and scriptural interpretations. The 1958 edition stated that the "official doctrine of the Church" asserted a "falsity of the theory of organic evolution." McConkie also wrote that "there were no pre-Adamites," that Adam was not the "end-product of evolution," and that there "was no death in the world, either for man or for any form of life until after the Fall of Adam."

=== Russell M. Nelson ===
Prior to becoming president of the LDS Church, Russell M. Nelson stated in a 2007 interview with the Pew Research Center that "to think that man evolved from one species to another is, to me, incomprehensible. Man has always been man. Dogs have always been dogs. Monkeys have always been monkeys. It's just the way genetics works." He also stated in 1987 in a church magazine article that he found the theory of evolution unbelievable.

== Academic ==
The earliest instance in which science and evolution were used to support LDS doctrine occurred in a series of six published articles in 1895, "Theosophy and Mormonism" by Nels L. Nelson. These articles were published in 1904 in Scientific Aspects of Mormonism. Nelson used the ideas of evolution to consider the spiritual and physical development of God and humans. Nelson's view of evolution is spiritual with deliberate use of scientific processes by God rather than as a random, accidental process. Mormon philosopher William Henry Chamberlin's Essay on Nature (1915) and Frederick J. Pack's Science and Belief in God (1924) defended the theory of evolution; both attempted to reconcile religion and evolution. In a work, Pack states, "no warfare exists between 'Mormonism' and true science."

In 1978, dean of the College of Biology and Agriculture at BYU, A. Lester Allen, tried to present an approach to evolution from the perspective of an LDS biologist. Allen established seven doctrinal landmarks that are fundamental beliefs of the LDS Church, but considered that human's limited perspective and limited perception of reality means that humans may not very well understand the circumstances surrounding the creation of Adam and Eve and the existence of the Garden of Eden using only their mortal senses. Allen also stated that besides core doctrine of the LDS Church relating to the existence of Adam, Eve, and the Garden of Eden, all hypotheses are fair game for "responsible scientists" to consider and investigate. In 2018, BYU professor and evolutionary biologist Steven L. Peck at a Mormon studies conference at Utah Valley University explained that Mormons believe in "eternal progression" and that the universe was organized from pre-existing matter, which are ideas also held by evolutionary biologists.

== Views in the early 2000s ==
There is an ongoing discussion and questioning among members of the LDS Church concerning the religion, evolution, and the reconciliation between the two. There are a number of current Mormon-related publications with articles on evolution. According to scholar Michael R. Ash, a great number of church members read the Ensign, which generally publishes articles with unfavorable views on evolution. Other publications like BYU Studies, FARMS Review of Books, Dialogue, and Sunstone have published pro-evolution or neutral articles. The official stance of the church on evolution is neutral. Though scholar Joseph Baker argues that the church's position is rather "skeptically neutral", because the church continues to endorse their 1910 statement. There are many church members, including scientists, who accept evolution as a legitimate scientific theory.

== Surveys of LDS members ==
Multiple surveys of views on evolution by general LDS adults have been conducted. For example, in 1973, 81% of students at the church-run university BYU denied that the creation involved evolution in a survey of over 1,000 respondents. In a 2014 U.S. Religious Landscape Study, researchers found that 52% of Mormons believe that humans always existed in their present form while 42% believe that humans evolved over time. More specifically, 29% of Mormons believe that evolution is guided by a supreme being, while 11% believe the evolution occurred due to natural processes.

A 2017 study, the Next Mormons Survey, professor Benjamin Knoll surveyed Mormons about their beliefs in evolution. Of those surveyed, 74% responded that they were confident or had faith that God created Adam and Eve in the last 10,000 years and that Adam and Eve did not evolve from other forms of life. When asked whether evolution is the best explanation for how God brought about life on Earth, 33% of Mormons were confident or had faith that this was not true. After analyzing the results Knoll suggested that 37% of Mormons completely reject God-guided evolution. Another 37% accept God-guided evolution for life on Earth, but feel that Adam and Eve were an exception and were physically created by God. The other 26% were split between the belief that Adam and Eve may have been created through the process of evolution and the disbelief in God-guided evolution and the existence of a physical Adam and Eve. Moreover, unlike other studies conducted which have found a correlation between education level and belief in evolution, Next Mormons Survey found no correlation between education level and belief in evolution among Mormons.

In contrast, a 2018 study of American Mormons in the Journal of Contemporary Religion found that education was a defining factor of evolution acceptance. This is, however, only true when accounting for political ideology as well. The study determined that among those with moderate or liberal political ideology, the probability of accepting evolution increases with increasing education level. The correlation between evolution acceptance and education level was even higher among liberals. The probability of accepting evolution among very liberal Mormons with an 8th grade or less education was 9%, while the probability of accepting evolution among very liberal Mormons with a post-graduate degree increases to 82%. The findings were different from conservative Mormons who showed a decrease in probability of accepting evolution as their education level increased. A very conservative Mormon with an 8th grade education or less had a 35% probability of accepting evolution, whereas a very conservative Mormon with a post-graduate degree was 20% likely to accept evolution. Baker suggests that low rates of acceptance of evolution of Mormons may be related to the high rates of political conservatism among Mormons.

A 2018 study in PLOS One researched the attitudes toward evolution of Latter-day Saint undergraduates. The study revealed that there has been a recent shift of attitude towards evolution among LDS undergraduates. These attitudes have shifted from antagonistic to accepting. The researchers cited examples of more acceptance of fossil and geological records, as well as an acceptance of the old age of the earth. The researchers attributed this attitude change to several factors including primary-school exposure to evolution and a reduction in the number of anti-evolution statements from the First Presidency.

== See also ==
- William Henry Chamberlin (philosopher)
- Ralph Vary Chamberlin
- Relationship between religion and science
- Ahmadiyya views on evolution
- Evolution and the Roman Catholic Church
- Jainism and non-creationism
- Jewish views on evolution
- Hindu views on evolution
- Issues in Science and Religion
