= Varyomus =

Scientific classification
- Domain: Eukaryota
- Kingdom: Animalia
- Phylum: Arthropoda
- Subphylum: Myriapoda
- Class: Diplopoda
- Order: Polydesmida
- Family: Aphelidesmidae
- Genus: Varyomus; Hoffman, 1954

Genus of millipedes

Varyomus is a genus of millipedes belonging to the family Aphelidesmidae.

The species of this genus are found in America.

Species:

- Varyomus confluens (Chamberlin, 1950)
- Varyomus levigatus (Attems, 1944)
