= Joseph C. Kingsbury =

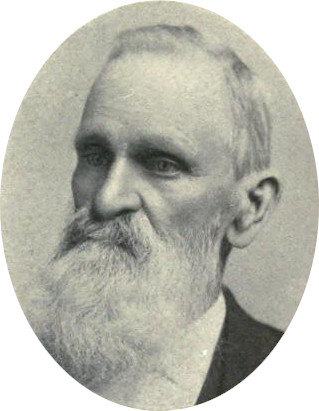
- Born: Joseph Corrodon Kingsbury; May 2, 1812; Enfield, Connecticut
- Died: October 15, 1898 (aged 86); Salt Lake City, Utah
- Burial place: Salt Lake City Cemetery
- Occupations: Pioneer, clergyman
- Spouses: Caroline Whitney (m. 1836; died 1842) Dorcas Moore (m. 1845; died 1869) Loenza Pond (m. 1846; died 1853) Eliza Mary Partridge (m. 1870)
- Children: Joseph T. Kingsbury; Mariah Loenza Kingsbury

Signature
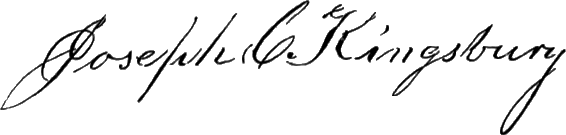

Joseph Corrodon Kingsbury (1812–1898) was a Mormon pioneer and local-level leader in the Church of Jesus Christ of Latter-day Saints (LDS Church).

== Biography ==
Kingsbury was born in Enfield, Connecticut on May 2, 1812. He joined the Church of Christ on January 15, 1832, while living in the household of Newel K. Whitney in Ohio. On February 3, 1836, he married Whitney's daughter Caroline. Caroline died on October 16, 1842 and shortly after that Kingsbury left to serve a mission in New England.

On November 22, 1845, he married Dorcas Moore (who would be the mother of future University of Utah President Joseph T. Kingsbury). In 1846, with Dorcas's consent, he polygamously married Stillman Pond's daughter Loenza, who would be the mother of Mariah Loenza Kingsbury, a wife of Apostle Marriner W. Merrill and mother of Apostle Joseph F. Merrill. As "sister wives", Dorcas and Loenza enjoyed a close relationship until Loenza's death in 1853 from "consumption," likely pneumonia. Dorcas died in 1869 from complications in childbirth, leaving Kingsbury widowed for a third time.

Kingsbury came to the Salt Lake Valley in 1847. From 1851 to 1854 he was bishop of the 2nd Ward in Salt Lake City. In 1883 he was ordained a patriarch. In 1870, Kingsbury married his fourth wife, English native Eliza Mary Partridge.

Kingsbury was a farmer in Weber County for several years. From 1858 on he worked in the tithing store in Salt Lake City. He was made its superintendent in 1867.

He died in Salt Lake City on October 15, 1898, and was buried at Salt Lake City Cemetery.

In 1985, a biography of Kingsbury by Lyndon W. Cook was published by Grandin Books in Provo, Utah.
