= Horace H. Cummings =

American educator and Latter-day Saints leader

Horace Hall Cummings (June 12, 1858 – August 1, 1937) was an American educator and a leader in the Church of Jesus Christ of Latter-day Saints (LDS Church).

Born in Provo, Utah Territory, Cummings attended the University of Utah and taught at a school in Millcreek, Utah and at Brigham Young College in Logan, Utah.

From 1885 to 1887, Cummings served as an LDS Church missionary in Mexico. He translated some sections of the Doctrine and Covenants into Spanish and in 1887 succeeded Helaman Pratt as the president of the Mexican Mission of the church.

In 1904 Cummings chaired the committee that put together the LDS education exhibit for the Palace of Education at the Louisiana Purchase Exposition, and exhibit that came away with more awards than the other state entrants.

In 1905, Cummings became the Commissioner of Church Schools for the LDS Church, succeeding Joseph M. Tanner. While Cummings was commissioner he was the key figure in investigating a group of professors at Brigham Young University for teaching new ideas, primarily that Joseph Smith's First Vision was not a real, physical event, and was heavily involved in removing these professors for advocating such unorthodox ideas.

He served as Church Commissioner of Education until 1920, when he was succeeded by apostle David O. McKay.

Cummings practiced plural marriage and was married to two women. Cummings died in Salt Lake City, Utah.

Cummings wrote a primary school textbook, Cummings Nature Study for Lower Grammar Grades. A review in the Journal of Education called it a "delightfully sensible" and "attractive" textbook.
