= Joseph T. Kingsbury =

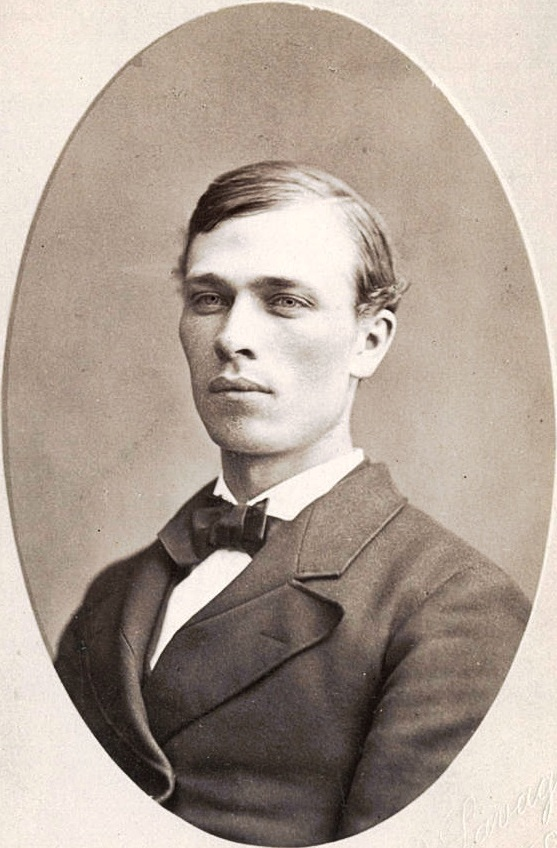

President of the University of Deseret
- Preceded by: John R. Park
- Succeeded by: James E. Talmage

Personal details
- Born: November 4, 1853 Weber County, Utah
- Died: April 10, 1937 (aged 84) Salt Lake City, Utah
- Education: University of Utah; Cornell University

Joseph Thomas Kingsbury (November 4, 1853 – April 10, 1937) was Acting President of the University of Deseret, now known as the University of Utah, from 1892 to 1894. In 1894 he was replaced by James E. Talmage, and then in 1897, was appointed President of the university. He held that position until he resigned because of a campus controversy in 1916. In spite of his resignation, Kingsbury's combined service as president of the university was longer than any other since.

== Family and Childhood ==
Joseph T. Kingsbury was born on November 4, 1853, to pioneer parents Joseph C. Kingsbury and Dorcas Moore, in Weber County, Utah. A few years after his birth, his family moved to Salt Lake City from the farm in Weber County, Utah. Kingsbury's father was a bishop in the Church of Jesus Christ of Latter-day Saints (LDS Church).

Kingsbury married Jane Mair on August 7, 1879. They had six children.

== Education and early career ==
Kingsbury attended the University of Deseret from 1872 to 1875 and Cornell University from 1875 to 1877. Kingsbury received his doctorate in 1894 through non-resident study from Illinois Wesleyan University.

Kingsbury joined the small faculty of the University of Deseret in 1878. (Until 1883, he was one of only three faculty members.) His teaching assignments included physics, chemistry, mineralogy, geology, geography and civil government.

== University Presidency ==
Kingsbury was the acting president of the University of Utah from 1892 to July 1894, when he became university vice president under James E. Talmage. He returned to the presidency on a permanent basis in 1897. He implemented plans to move the university to a new site on lands purchased from your Fort Douglas.

During Kingsbury's presidency the university added a law school. In 1907, a department of law was founded, with Kingsbury as one of its initial faculty members. In 1913, the department was organized into the School of Law.

University expansion continued. From 1900 to 1916 the total number of students tripled.

An escalating series of controversies began in 1914 — stemming from a similar 1911 controversy at Brigham Young University — which resulted in Kingsbury's resignation in 1916. On June 14, 1914, Milton H. Sevy, a student speaking at commencement, criticized Governor William Spry, the conservative atmosphere of Utah, and the political influence of Mormon leaders.

The following spring Kingsbury moved against professors supportive of Sevy's speech. On February 26, 1915, Kingsbury announced that the university would not reappoint two professors and two instructors. On March 1, he announced Osborne J.P. Widtsoe would replace George M. Marshall as the chair of the English department. A majority of enrolled students signed petitions protesting the firings. On March 17, a day after the Board of Regents upheld the dismissals, fourteen faculty members resigned in protest (including Joseph Peterson, who had first resigned from BYU in its 1911 imbroglio). Three more departed in subsequent weeks.

The controversy aligned opponents of Church influence with earlier detractors of Kingsbury's leadership. Frank E. Holman, the dean of the law school, later accused Kingsbury of maintaining a policy of repression. Others were concerned that the dismissals of the four non-Mormons and the promotion of Widtsoe reflected Church interference. Even though Kingsbury had been connected with the anti-Mormon Liberal Party, Mormon apostle Anthon H. Lund supported Kingsbury on the Board of Regents.

The dismissals and protests were reported in the local and national press. They prompted the first ever investigation conducted by the American Association of University Professors (AAUP), spearheaded by Arthur O. Lovejoy (Secretary) and John Dewey (President). The AAUP published, in December 1915, its inaugural volume of the Bulletin of the American Association of University Professors, including the document now known as the 1915 Declaration of Principles on Academic Freedom and Academic Tenure — the AAUP's foundational statement on the rights and corresponding obligations of members of the academic profession.

Majorities on the Board of Regents initially supported Kingsbury despite calls for his resignation. In April, Kingsbury traveled to the eastern United States to recruit replacements for departing faculty. Kingsbury finally resigned as president on January 20, 1916. John A. Widtsoe became the next university president.

== Later life ==
While accepting his resignation as president, the board gave Kingsbury an appointment in the chemistry department. Because that also was controversial, Kingsbury instead was given other work in the university, including chairing a committee on graduate work.

Kingsbury was an uncle of Joseph F. Merrill; also of Oliver Kingsbury Meservy.

In 1930 university auditorium was named Kingsbury Hall in his honor. Kingsbury died on April 10, 1937, in Salt Lake City.

Academic offices
Preceded by John R. Park	President of the University of Utah; 1892–1894	Succeeded by James E. Talmage
Preceded by James E. Talmage	President of the University of Utah; 1897–1916	Succeeded by John A. Widtsoe
