= Timeline of teachings on homosexuality in the LDS Church =

Mormon teachings on homosexuality

Homosexuality has been publicly discussed by top leaders in the Church of Jesus Christ of Latter-day Saints (LDS church)—Mormonism's largest denomination—since the late 19th century. The frequency of teachings on same-sex sexual activity increased starting in the late 1950s. Most discussion focuses on male homosexuality and rarely mentions lesbianism or bisexuality. Below is a timeline of notable speeches, publications, and policies in the LDS church on the topic of homosexuality.

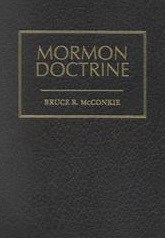
This highly influential publication was the first general-authority-authored book to explicitly contain church stances on homosexuality.

== 1890s to the 1950s ==
- 1897 – First Presidency member George Q. Cannon used the media attention on the 1895 conviction and two-year imprisonment of famed Irish poet Oscar Wilde as an opportunity to publicly condemn homosexual behavior as an abominable, filthy, nameless crime. He continued stating that the only way to stop homosexuals was for God to wipe them out.
- 1952 – An increase in US public discourse around homosexuality in the McCarthyist Lavender scare era contributed to the first explicit mention of the topic in general conference. The apostle Clark lamented homosexuality was found among men and women, and that homosexual people exercised great influence in shaping culture.
- 1958 – General authority Bruce R. McConkie published Mormon Doctrine, in which he stated that homosexuality is among Lucifer's chief means of leading souls to hell, and that it is better to be dead clean, than alive unclean. The book was viewed by many both then and now as representing official church doctrine despite never being endorsed by the church.

== 1960s ==
- 1964 – The apostle Spencer W. Kimball called homosexuality a malady, disease, and an abominable and detestable crime against nature that was curable by self mastery. He cited one lay bishop (a businessman by trade) assigned by the church to administer a program of sexual orientation change efforts through which he claimed there had been numerous "cures." He said the police, the courts, and the judges had referred many individuals directly to the church.

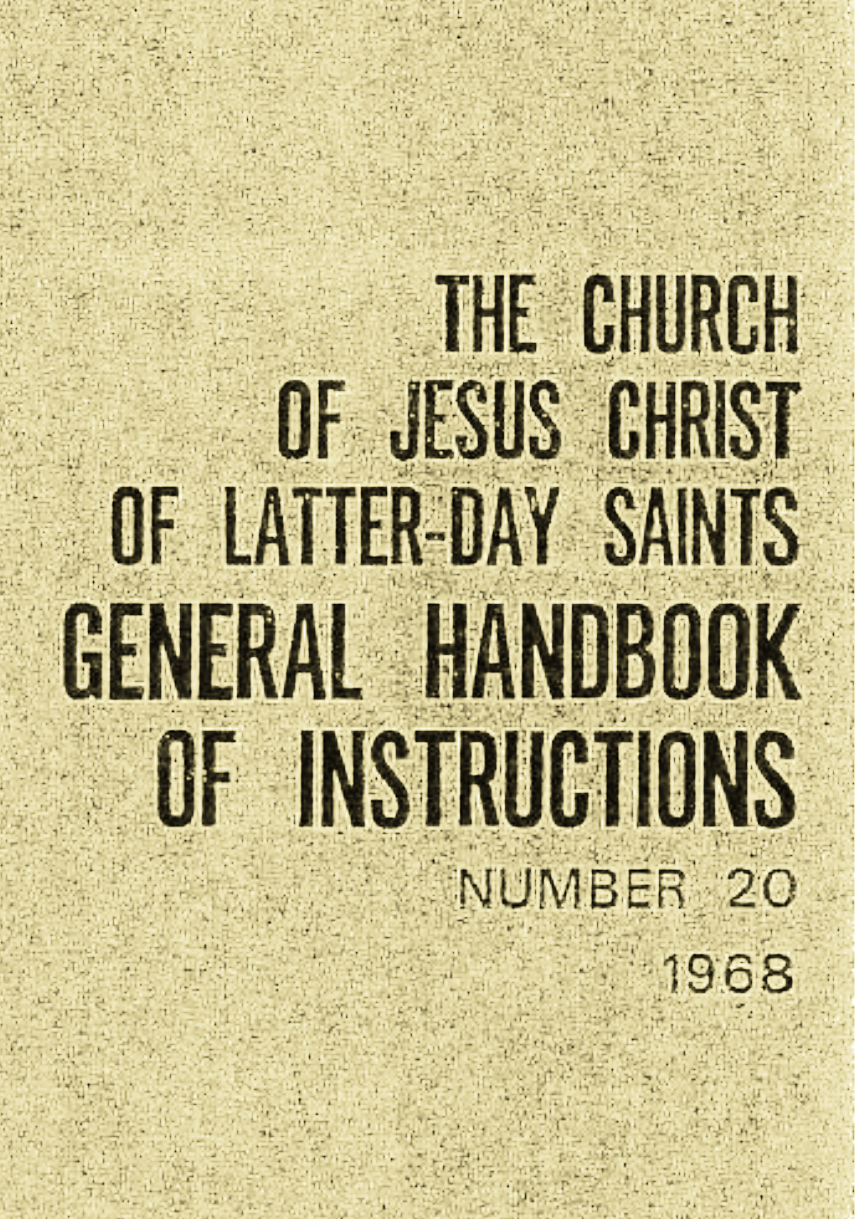
The 1968 leader handbook was the first release to explicitly mention homosexuality.

- 1965 – Kimball again addressed homosexuality calling it a gross, heinous, obnoxious, abominable, vicious sin. He stated that those with homosexual desires were like alcoholics and could correct and overcome their desires. In the BYU speech he stated the university will not knowingly enroll nor tolerate anyone with homosexual tendencies who failed to repent, and that it was a damnable heresy for a homosexual person to say God made them that way. He also stated that sometimes masturbation was an introduction to homosexuality.
- 1965 – Ernest L. Wilkinson, addressed the BYU student body implementing a ban on students with homosexual feelings since he believed they "contaminated" the campus.

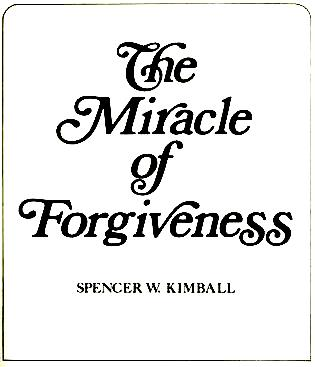
Kimball's influential book taught that homosexuality was curable and was officially recommended as a resource for homosexual members into the 90s.

- 1968 – An update to the church handbook contained its first explicit mention of homosexuality, specifying that homo-sexual [sic] acts require a church court.
- 1969 – Kimball released his book The Miracle of Forgiveness, in which he again taught that masturbation can lead to acts of homosexuality. It became a best-seller in the church and was routinely given to missionaries. His book was quoted in a 1979 church manual where it stated that homosexuality is curable and certainly overcome as long as the person continues knocking at the door to a cure until their knuckles are bloody. Kimball viewed homosexual people as basically good people trapped in sin, and posited that some of them totally conquer their homosexuality in a few months, but sometimes it led to sex with animals.

== 1970s ==
- 1970 – Victor L. Brown of the Presiding Bishopric stated that a normal and healthy 12- or 13-year-old boy or girl could develop into a homosexual if exposed to pornographic literature and other "abnormalities".

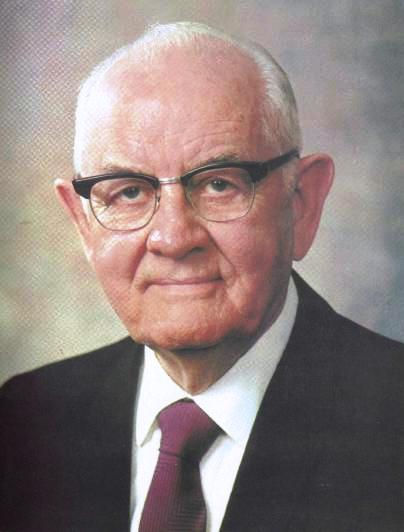
Spencer W. Kimball was assigned as a church specialist on homosexuality in 1946 and shaped church teachings on the subject through numerous speeches and publications in the 1960s and 1970s.

- 1970 – The church produced Hope for Transgressors, in which apostles Spencer W. Kimball and Mark E. Petersen offer ideas to leaders about how to effect a total "cure" and bring the lives of men with homosexual feelings into total normalcy. Suggestions included prayer, cutting off contact with homosexual friends, dating women, marriage, and scripture reading. It called homosexuality a despicable, degraded, dread practice, and a perversion that would doom the world, but stated it was not totally the fault of family conditions and concluded it "CAN be cured" (emphasis in the original).

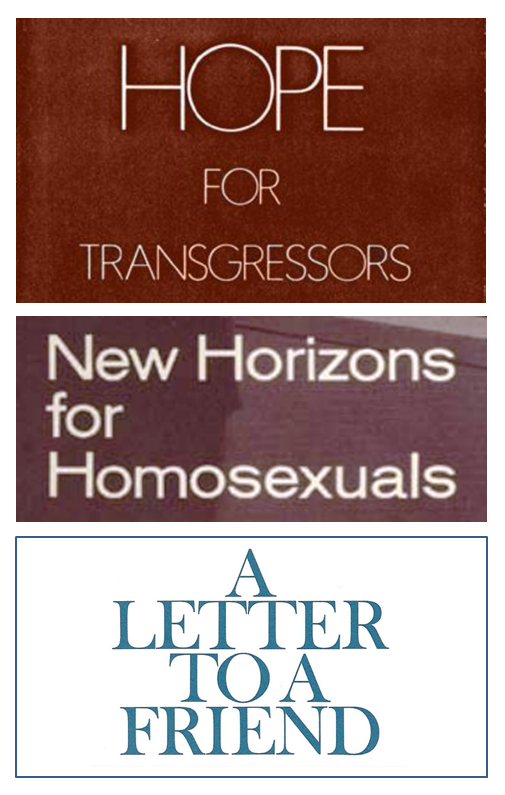
Booklet revisions of Kimball's influential 1970s discourse on homosexuality (from the top: 1970, 1971, 1978).

- 1971 – Kimball revised and retitled Hope for Transgressors as New Horizons for Homosexuals in which he called homosexuality a ruinous practice of perversion that the church will never condone. It states that the idea that "perverts" are "born that way" was a base lie since Kimball believed homosexuality was curable, and could be overcome until recovery. It also called homosexuality ugly, degenerate, unnatural, vicious, base, a waste of power, a deep sin, and an end to the family and civilization. The publication advised that for a homosexual man to recover he must shun anyone associated with the transgression and pray and read the scriptures. The pamphlet would be reissued in 1978 as a 30-page pamphlet titled A Letter to a Friend.

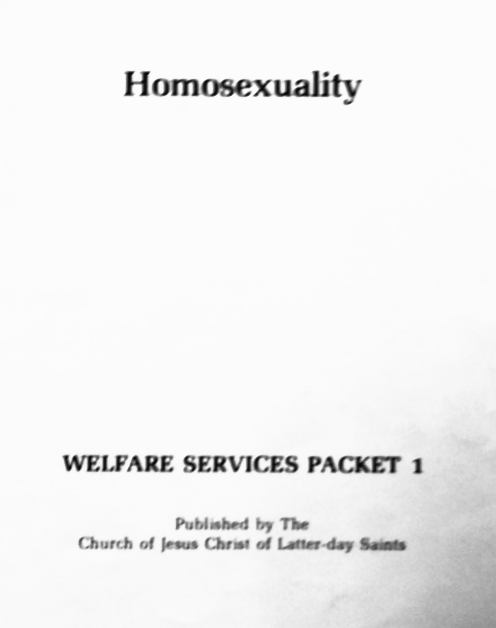
A 1973 church publication which taught that a passive father and domineering mother can cause homosexuality, and that conforming to gender norms will change it.

- 1973 – The church published a guide for bishops and stake presidents which posited that homosexual behavior begins by being molested (though stating that not all who are molested become homosexual). It also suggested that homosexuality was caused by a domineering mother and a passive father. As far as changing the sexual orientation, the packet says that a lesbian needs to learn feminine behavior, and a gay man must learn the manly, heterosexual, straight way of life.
- 1974 – Kimball as a recently appointed church president again stated that masturbation and pornography lead to homosexuality.
- 1975 – The presiding bishop Victor L. Brown stated that a "lack of proper affection in the home" can result in homosexual children.

Members of LDS Social Services (renamed "Family Services" in 1995) were tasked with treating homosexual Mormons in 1972 and produced several important publications on homosexuality in 1973, 1995, and 1999.

- 1975 – Robert L. Blattner of LDS Social Services addressed LDS psychologists and said the causes of homosexuality in men was a lack of relationship with peers, and a disturbed family background of an absent father and controlling mother. For the causes of female homosexuality he only acknowledged a lack of information. Blattner said homosexual behavior and alcoholism are similar and stated that most people can be helped by electric shock behavior modification (in reference to BYU's ongoing aversion therapy program).
- 1976 – A version of the church handbook changed the grounds for a church court from "homo-sexual [sic] acts" to "homosexuality." This change seemed to make members vulnerable to church punishment for having a homosexual orientation alone even without sexual activity.

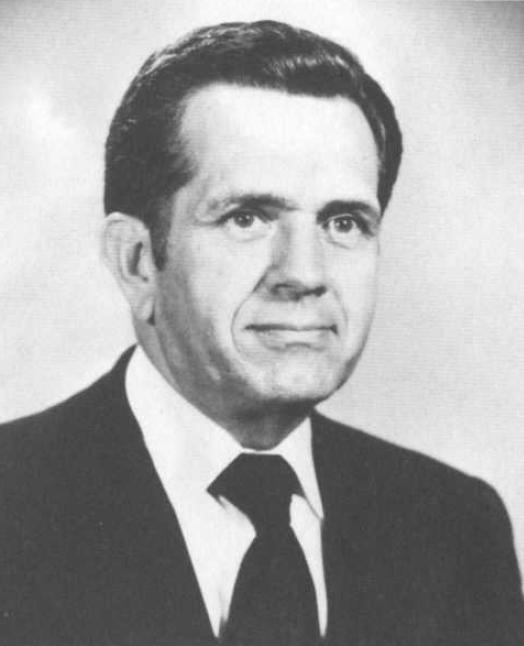
Apostle Boyd K. Packer played a large role in shaping over three decades of teachings on homosexuality through numerous speeches containing the subject.

- 1976 – Apostle Boyd K. Packer gave the sermon "To Young Men Only" in the October general conference in which he commended a missionary who was upset after he floored (i.e. punched so hard he fell to the ground) his assigned male companion in response to unwanted sexual advances, saying "somebody had to do it." He further asserted that it is a lie that some are born with homosexual attractions. The sermon circulated though the church as a pamphlet from 1980 until 2016.

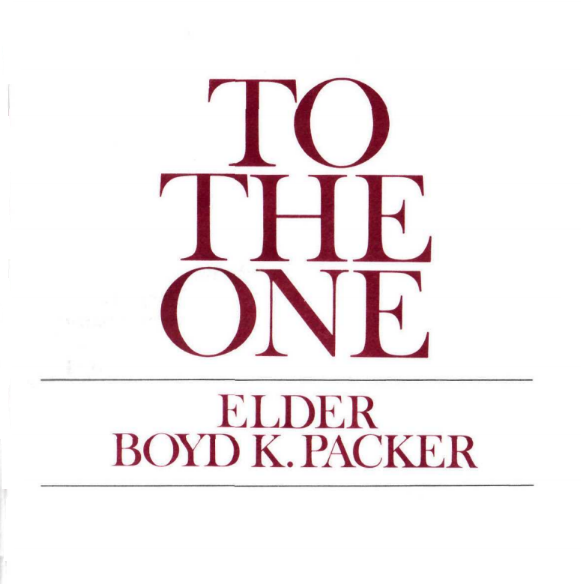
Pamphlet containing the apostle Boyd K. Packer's 1978 BYU speech on homosexuality.

- 1978 – Apostle Packer delivered the sermon "To the One" at BYU in response to the recent controversy generated from a widely circulated pro-gay pamphlet by a gay BYU student and gay BYU instructor. He characterized homosexual interaction as a perversion and presented the possibility that it had its roots in selfishness and could be cured with unselfish thoughts and acts. He stated that homosexuality was not discussed much publicly by the church since talking about it can very foolishly cause things leaders are trying to prevent.
- 1978 – The First Presidency released a statement outlining reasons for their opposition to the Equal Rights Amendment including unnatural consequences like an increase in the practice of homosexual and lesbian activities.

== 1980s ==
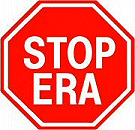
The church opposed the ERA in part because of the belief that it could lead to same-sex marriage and parenting.

- 1980 – The Ensign published an article stating that a passing of the Equal Rights Amendment would lead to legalizing same-sex marriage and children being raised in a homosexual home.
- 1981 – In an April General Conference, church Seventy Hartman Rector Jr. stated "If children have a happy family experience they will not want to be homosexual", and that homosexuality is an acquired addiction like drugs and pornography.
- 1981 – The church issued a guide for LDS Social Services employees instructing them that a homosexual orientation is not inborn and there is hope of change, as well as stating that a homosexual man is afraid of the other sex and does not fully understand how to act and think like a masculine man.

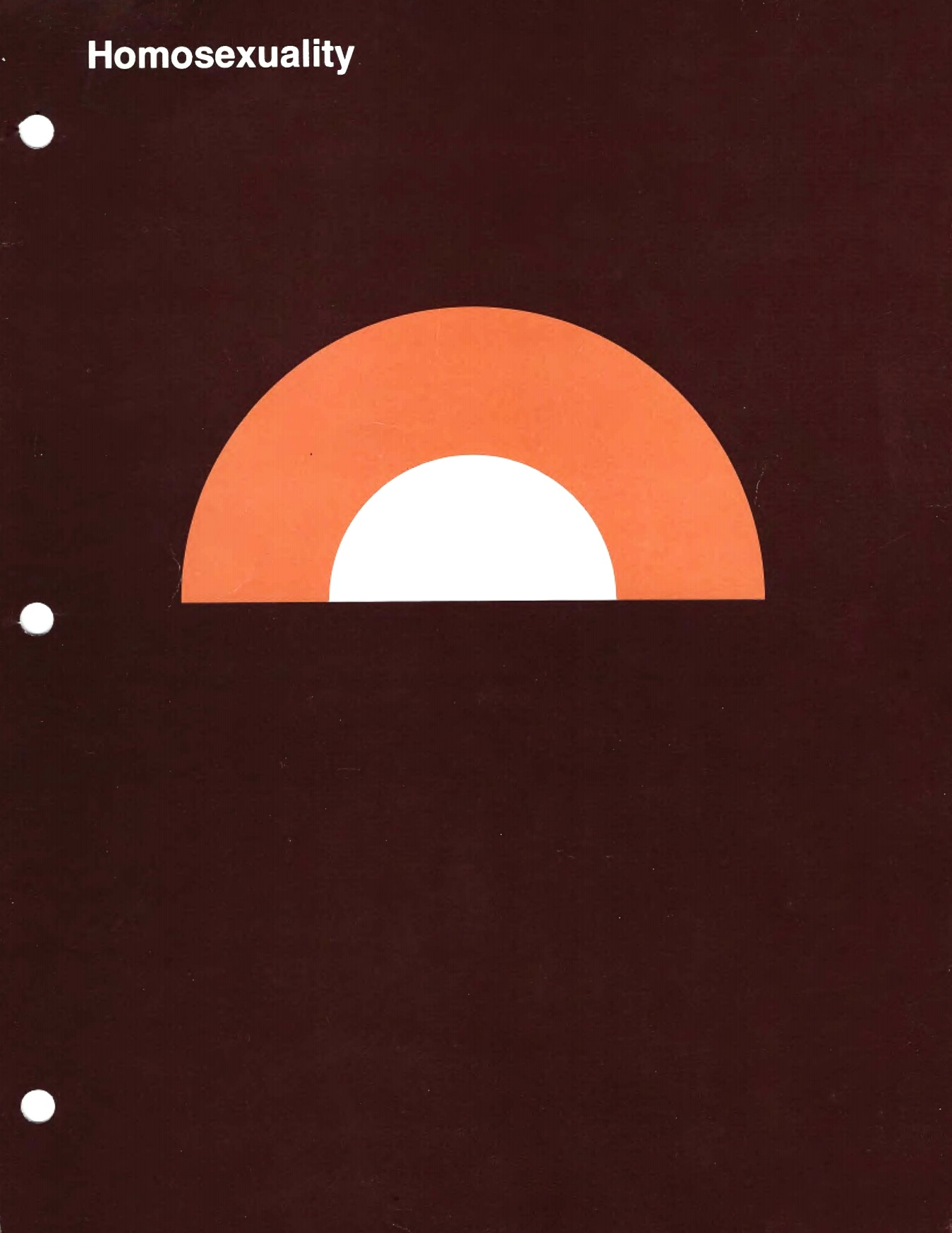
Cover of a 1981 church manual which taught homosexuality was not inborn, but caused by masturbation or an unhealthy childhood, and was changeable through praying, and heterosexual dating.

- 1981 – Another church guide was released for local church leaders which stated that homosexual inclinations are changeable and not inborn. The booklet gave guidelines for the treatment and prevention of homosexuality such as dating, praying, and reading church literature. It stated that homosexual behavior is learned and influenced by an unhealthy childhood, masturbation, and experimentation.
- 1983 – The Church Handbook wording was updated to state that a church court may be convened to consider serious transgressions like homosexuality and lesbianism, but that it was not required. Some leaders punished even celibate people who confessed to experiencing homosexual feelings.
- 1986 – Dallin H. Oaks commented on a CBS-TV interview that marriage is not doctrinal therapy for homosexual relations, and stated he did not know if any leaders had advised homosexual individuals to enter mixed-orientation marriages.
- 1987 – Gordon B. Hinckley of the First Presidency stated that marriage should not be viewed as a therapeutic step to solve problems such as homosexual inclinations or practices.
- 1989 – The Church Handbook wording was updated to refer to homosexual relations rather than just homosexuality itself. Additionally the update required a church court for any homosexual activity by members with a prominent church position.

== 1990s ==
- 1990 – An update to the "For the Strength of Youth" guidelines pamphlet mentioned homosexuality for the first time, characterizing it as an unnatural affection, sex perversion, and abomination.
- 1991 – The First Presidency sent a letter read before all congregations which stated homosexual thoughts and feelings can and should be overcome by sincere repentance, persistent effort, the help of others, and counsel from a bishop. The letter made a distinction between thoughts and behavior, and called for love and understanding for those struggling to overcome homosexual thoughts.

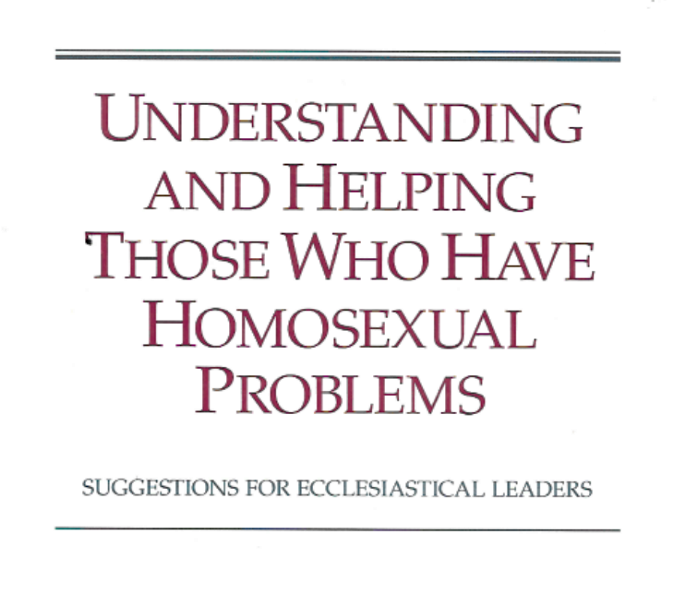
Cover of a 1992 manual which marked a shift in LDS Church rhetoric towards changing homosexual behavior rather than feelings

- 1992 – The church published a guide for local leaders which stated that homosexual feelings can be overcome, and sometimes heterosexual feelings emerge leading to happy, eternal marriage relationships. The pamphlet did not frame homosexuality as a disease corresponding to the recent change by the World Health Organization removing homosexuality as a mental disorder.
- 1994 – The First Presidency issued a statement encouraging members to contact their legislators in an effort to reject same-sex marriage.
- 1995 – First presidency member James Faust wrote an article denying any biological components in the causes of homosexuality, and stated that gay relationships would help unravel society.

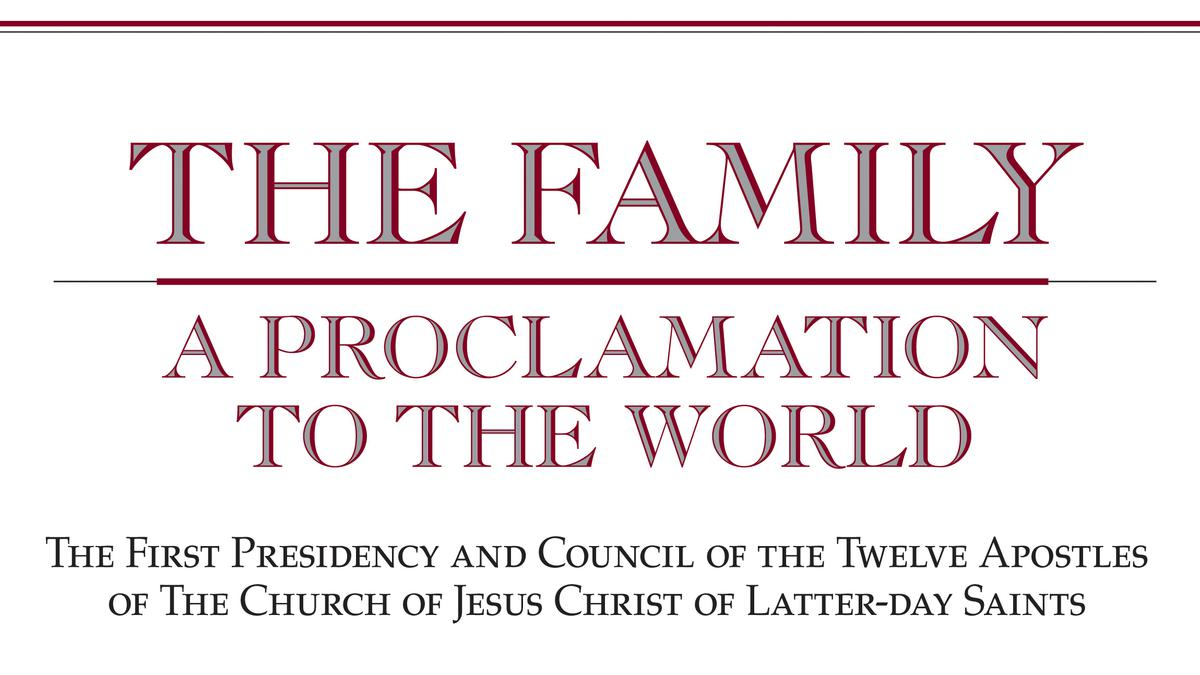
"The Family: A Proclamation to the World" is a 1995 LDS Church statement used as a legal document in several court case amicus briefs opposing same-sex marriage.

- 1995 – Church president Gordon B. Hinckley released "The Family: A Proclamation to the World" which stated that marriage between a man and a woman is essential and ordained of God, and that gender is an essential part of one's eternal identity and purpose. The document was submitted by the church in several amicus briefs as evidence against legalizing same-sex marriages.
- 1995 – Hinckley condemned same-sex marriage, but invited members of the church reach out and sympathize with homosexual individuals.
- 1995 – An article by Dallin H. Oaks denounced gay bashing and gave a nuanced view on potential biological components of the etiology of homosexuality. It also advised against using the sexual identifiers gay or lesbian.
- 1995 – The church's Family Services published a manual for practitioners stating that dysfunctional family relationships and abuse were at the root of homosexuality. The guide gave suggestions on how to prevent and treat homosexuality.

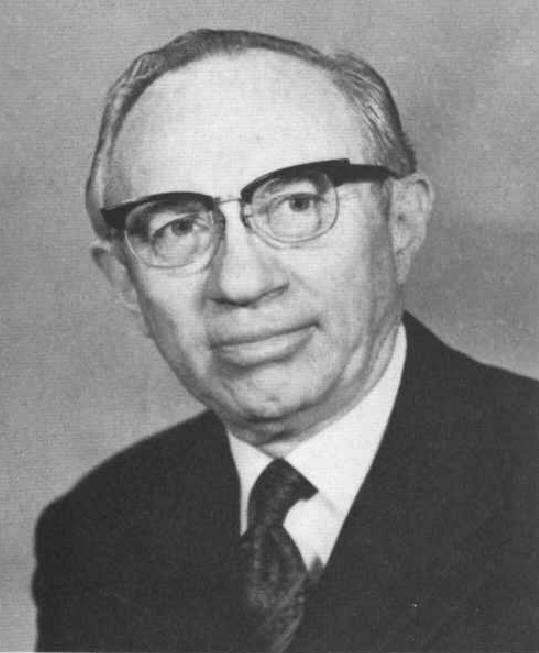
During his 13 years as president of the LDS Church, Hinckley brought a shift in tone towards empathy in church public discussions on homosexuality.

- 1997 – Hinckley gave an interview in which he called gay members of the church good people and said they are not reprimanded for their attractions unless they participated in sexual acts. He affirmed that gay Mormons must live a celibate life.
- 1998 – The Church Handbook was updated to ban members from full-time missionary service who had participated in "homosexual acts" from age 15 (unless it had been at least one year since the occurrence and there was strong evidence of reformation). The update also included the first handbook policy sections on homosexuality and same-gender marriage, stating that members with homosexual thoughts, feelings, or actions should be instructed in order to understand faith, repentance, life's purpose, and to accept responsibility for their thoughts. Additionally, the handbook encouraged members to petition government officials to reject same-sex marriage.
- 1999 – The Area Presidency of the North America West Area sent a letter to all area leaders directing members to donate their means and time to pass the Knight Initiative against same-sex marriage in California. A second letter invited church members to donate money, and a third letter (sent a month and a half before the proposition would pass) asked members to redouble their efforts in contacting neighbors and to place provided yard signs.
- 1999 – The church published an article stating that homosexuality was changeable and heterosexual feelings will emerge. It said homosexuality was caused by personality traits, sexual abuse, familial factors, and treatment by peers.

== 2000s ==
- 2000 – Packer called homosexuality a temptation which may lead to despair, disease, and death, and one which begins as an innocent curiosity leading to a pattern and then addiction. He said the idea that God created homosexual people with "overpowering, unnatural desires" is false and that they could be cured and healed.

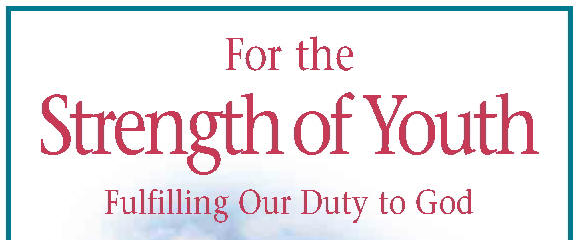
The 2001 update to the youth guideline pamphlet removed the harsher language of the 1990 edition which characterized homosexual feelings as unnatural, perverse, and an abomination.

- 2001 – An update to the "For the Strength of Youth" removed some previous descriptors and only said homosexual activity was a serious sin, and that those "struggling with same-gender attraction" should talk to their parents and bishop.
- 2004 – The church published True to the Faith, which stated that homosexual activity was contrary to the purposes of human sexuality, distorted loving relationships, and prevented people from receiving blessings. The book further said that sexual sins were more serious than any other sins except murder and denying the Holy Ghost.
- 2006 – Jeffrey R. Holland and Marlin K. Jensen were interviewed by PBS with questions about various topics including homosexuality. Jensen stated that he did not think the church could ever change its position on homosexual behavior, and acknowledged that this created a lot of pain since homosexual Mormons had no hope of falling in love in a church-sanctioned way. Holland stated that he did not anticipate a change in church stance, and affirmed that gay or lesbian attractions disappear after death.
- 2006 – A revision to the church's Mission Presidents Handbook recommended that, barring unusual circumstances, a missionary who makes a belated confession to a serious transgression like pre-mission homosexual acts should be sent home. The manual also specified that any baptismal candidate confessing to a homosexual transgression during a baptismal interview (usually with a mission district leader) needs a searching interview with the local mission president for baptism approval.

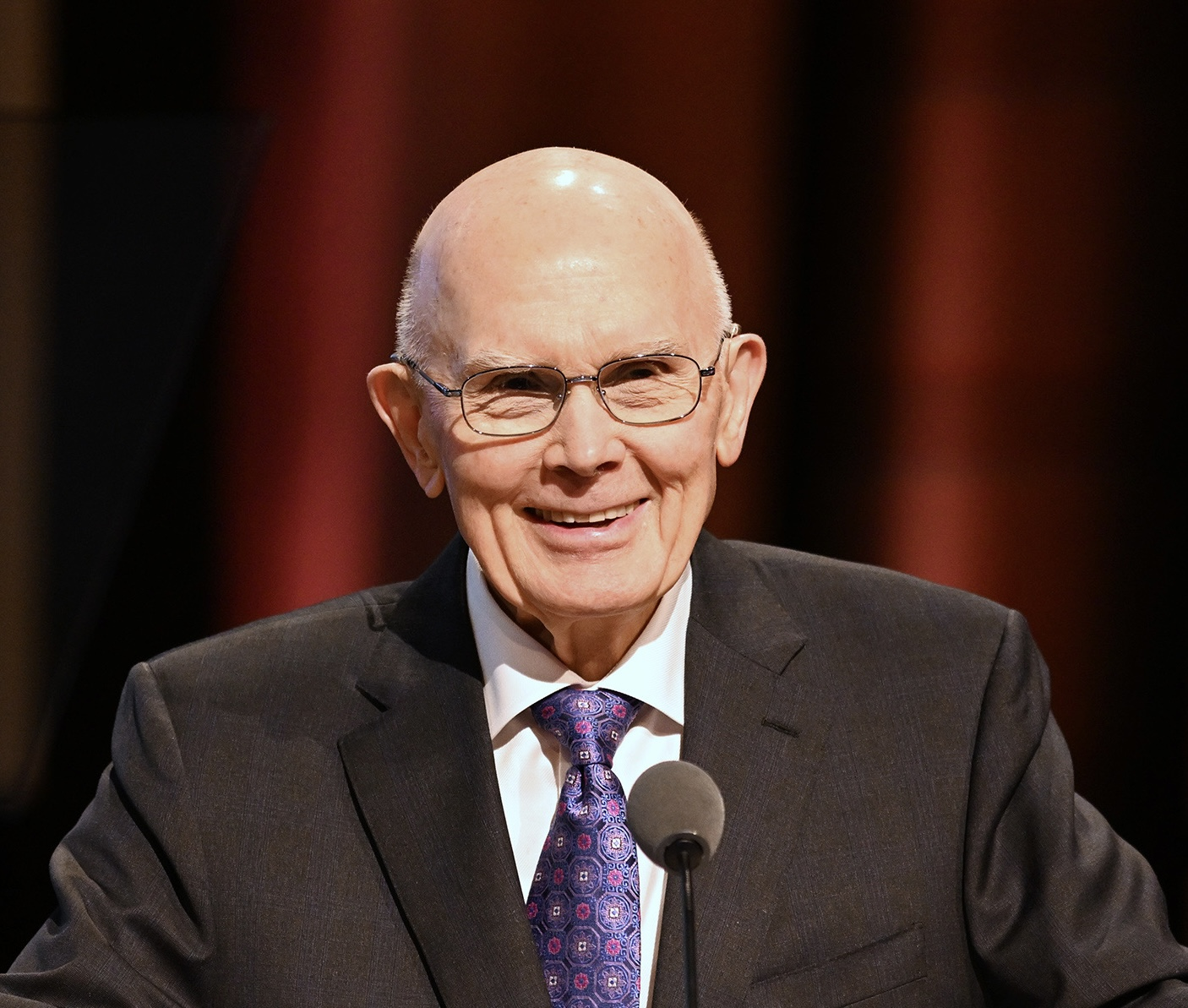
The apostle Dallin Oaks has been an influential figure in church interactions with homosexual people, instituting a system of surveillance to identify and expel or attempt to "cure" homosexual students as president of BYU in the 1970s, and doing numerous video interviews and articles on the topic in the 1980s, 1990s, and 2000s.

- 2006 – The church published an extensive interview about homosexuality with Dallin Oaks and Lance B. Wickman. In the interview, Wickman stated the church does not counsel against conversion therapy and that it may be appropriate for some. However, Oaks stated they cannot endorse the aversive therapies recommended in the past to change sexual orientation, and they do not accept responsibility for the abuses suffered by individuals who had experienced the now disavowed therapy. He added that a mixed-orientation marriage would be appropriate for a gay member who could put their homosexual feelings in the background and felt a great attraction to someone of the opposite sex. Oaks compared devout homosexual members to those with physical or mental disabilities who were also not be able to marry, and added that same-sex attraction did not exist in the pre-earth life, and would not exist in the next life. He further stated that parents of gay children in same-sex relationships might tell their child they could not stay overnight at the parents' house, or expect them to appear in public appearances with the same-sex couple as it could imply an approval of their relationship. He further stated the Lord's way was to love the sinner while condemning the sin.
- 2006 – In April the apostle Russell M. Nelson signed a letter with other religious leaders urging the US government to pass a national amendment banning same-sex marriage. The next month the First Presidency released another statement supporting the amendment and urging members to contact their senators.
- 2006 – The apostle Oaks stated that changing sexual orientation is possible, but that members should not focus on the causes of same-sex attraction. Oaks said that if faith, prayers, and priesthood do not heal one from an affliction, then the Atonement can help one bear the burden.
- 2007 – BYU's Board of Trustees, under the direction of First Presidency member Monson, revised the university's conduct code to state that coming out was not an Honor Code issue, but that it continued to ban all forms of physical intimacy expressing homosexual feelings.

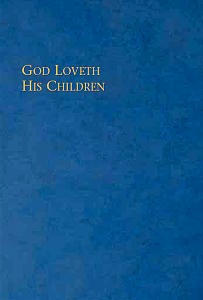
"God Loveth His Children" was the first church publication for members on homosexuality produced in nearly three decades since "To the One" and "A Letter to a Friend" were released in 1978.

- 2007 – In July, the church published the booklet "God Loveth His Children" summarizing church teachings on homosexuality.
- 2008 – The First Presidency again urged California members to do all they could by giving effort and time to help pass a state amendment banning same-sex marriage. A few months later the apostles Ballard, Cook, and L. Whitney Clayton gave a satellite broadcast to all California members asking them to volunteer four hours per week and to set aside Saturday mornings for calling other Californians and for other efforts supporting Prop 8. They stated that tolerance does not mean tolerating transgression, and noted the existence of temple-worthy members attracted to the same sex. Additionally, a video of the apostle Bednar was featured on the church's official website PreservingMarriage.org, and members were instructed to register there.
- 2009 – The seventy member Bruce C. Hafen promised members of Evergreen if they were faithful they may develop heterosexual attractions in this life, and would be resurrected with heterosexual attractions, citing the apostle Oaks, and affirming that "it MUST be true" (emphasis in original).

== 2010s ==
- 2010 – An update to the Church Handbook noted that records of adult members with repeated homosexual activities would be permanently annotated. It also advised that homosexual activity during or after the last three teenage years would bar someone from missionary service. The handbook also stated that members who experience same-sex attraction, but do not engage in homosexual behavior, may receive church callings and temple recommends.
- 2010 – The apostle Packer referred to homosexual relationships as "substitutes or counterfeits for marriage." He said it was "not so" that some are "preset and cannot overcome what they feel are inborn temptations toward the impure and unnatural." He continued stating, "Why would our Heavenly Father do that to anyone?", but the statement was omitted in the printed version of the talk. His remarks sparked a protest in which thousands surrounded Temple Square.
- 2011 – The BYU Honor Code was updated to remove the ban on advocacy and promotion of homosexual behavior as being morally acceptable.

This header was at the top of the church's first official website on homosexuality from 2012 until an update in 2016.

- 2012 – The church launched a website dedicated to the topic of homosexuality in an effort to encourage understanding. It stated individuals do not choose to experience same-sex attractions.
- 2013 – The church released a statement approving the Boy Scouts of America (BSA) administration's decision to remove the 1991 ban on homosexual youth. In 2010, the church had the largest portion of scouts in the BSA of any denomination (21%).
- 2015 – Church leaders held a news conference in support of LGBT non-discrimination laws for housing and employment as long as those laws exempted religious institutions. The apostle Christofferson called for a balance between religious freedom and LGBT rights while Neill F. Marriott of the Young Women's presidency recognized the centuries of ridicule, persecution, and violence against homosexual people. Apostle Oaks stated that the church rejected persecution based on gender or sexual orientation and called for legislation protecting religious freedoms as well as LGBT citizens in housing, employment, and public accommodations. In answer to a press question afterwards Christofferson affirmed his love for his gay brother Tom, who was in a 20-year relationship with a man.
- 2015 – The church released a public statement and employed its lobbyists to garner support for a proposed Utah nondiscrimination bill granting housing and employment protection for LGBT persons in Utah. Though similar bills had failed six times before, SB 296 was passed in March. The new law (nicknamed the "Utah Compromise") passed and was well regarded by many.
- 2015 – Three days after the US Supreme Court ruling in Obergefell v. Hodges in favor of same-sex marriage, the First Presidency sent a letter to be read in every US congregation stating that the changing US laws would not change God's moral law. The letter clarified that leaders should not perform same-sex marriages, and that church property could not be used for activities related to same-sex marriages. It welcomed all visitors on church property as long as LDS rules of conduct were respected.
- 2015 – Following a BSA policy change allowing for gay scout leaders (while still allowing for churches to continue banning them), the church stated it had always welcomed gay youth, but that allowing openly gay leaders was incompatible with church doctrine. The press release alluded to a potential change in church-BSA relations. Despite the majority of polled church members wanting to drop relations with the BSA, however, no change in relations occurred.
- 2015 – On November 5 an updated letter to leaders for the Church Handbook was leaked outlining stricter treatment of members in same-sex relationships and their children. The next day around 1,500 members gathered across from church headquarters to submit their resignation letters in response to the policy change, with thousands more resigning online in the weeks after. Two months later, the apostle Nelson stated the change was revealed to President Monson as the will of the Lord.
- 2016 – The church released a statement mourning the reported suicides of 32 LGBT Mormons. it said leaders and members were taught to reach out in an active, caring way to all, especially to youth who felt estranged or isolated.
- 2016 – A church spokesperson expressed opposition to the proposed hate crime bill SB107 in Utah which would add sexual orientation to the current list of attributes protected from hate crimes. The bill failed as it had in past years and its LDS, Republican sponsor criticized the church for its opposition to the bill, citing the church's press release as the reason for its failure.
- 2016 – The apostle David A. Bednar stated that there were no homosexual members of the church, and compared homosexuality to a physical handicap.
- 2016 – A church spokesperson stated the church denounces any therapy subjecting an individual to abusive practices, and hopes LGBT Mormons find compassion and understanding from family members, professional counselors and church members. The statement was in response to media inquiries around the experiences of a lesbian, teen church member subjected to physically abusive sexual orientation change efforts which ultimately lead to her suicide attempt.

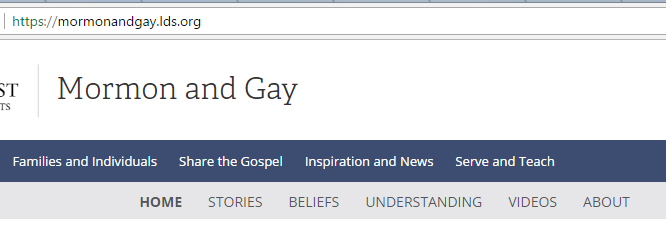
The 2016 website update contained the first church disavowal of all therapy focusing on changing sexual orientation.

- 2016 – The official Mormons and Gays website was revised and moved to mormonandgay.lds.org. The update supported members in identifying as gay and stated that therapy focusing on changing sexual orientation was unethical. The 2016 update still offered qualified statements that reparative therapy should be an option, and promised that orientation change could occur.
- 2017 - The apostle Oaks spoke at a BYU devotional saying, "I would like to hear a little more musket fire from this temple of learning, especially on the subject of our fundamental doctrine and policies on the family."
- 2017 – The apostle Oaks stated that the Family Proclamation's teachings on same-sex marriage were not changeable policies but statements of eternal truth, the will of God, and the basis for church teachings and practice over the last two decades. He lamented the increase in public acceptance of same-sex marriage and acknowledged the conflicts with friends and family that opposing this acceptance could cause. He further stated that despite the conflict church members should choose God and the LDS Church's plan and way.
- 2019 – The church's 2016 tacit endorsement of conversion therapy was announced as overturned when a spokesperson for the church stated, "We are opposed to conversion therapy and our therapists do not practice it."

== 2020s ==
- 2021 – The apostle Holland gave an address at a BYU devotional re-emphasizing Oaks' 2017 call for metaphorical "musket fire," in "defending marriage as the union of a man and a woman."
- 2022 - The Church releases an official statement supporting the proposed federal legislation of the Respect for Marriage Act, which is intended to protect gay-marriage rights, but only after an amendment was added, after passing through the House, stating that no church can face a civil lawsuit or other legal action for refusing to provide any service or access to its facilities for any marriage it opposes.
- 2025 - In the October 2025 General Conference, Apostle Rasband declares that The Family: A Proclamation to the World is "doctrine."
