= LDS Church and masturbation =

On many occasions spanning over a century, leaders of the Church of Jesus Christ of Latter-day Saints (LDS Church) have taught that adherents should not masturbate as part of obedience to the code of conduct known as the law of chastity. This denomination within Mormonism places great emphasis on the sexual behavior of Mormon adherents as a commitment to follow the law of chastity is required for baptism, adherence is required to receive a temple recommend, and it is part of the temple endowment ceremony covenants devout participants promise by oath to keep. A 2011 church manual quotes former church president Spencer W. Kimball who taught that the law of chastity includes "masturbation ... and every hidden and secret sin and all unholy and impure thoughts and practices." Before serving full-time missions, young adults are required to abandon the practice as it is believed to be a gateway sin that dulls sensitivity to the guidance of the Holy Ghost. The first recorded public mention of masturbation by a general church leader to a broad audience was in 1952 by apostle J. Reuben Clark, and recent notable mentions include in 2016, 2019, and 2021.

Although rhetoric has softened and become less direct, the prohibition on masturbation remains in place, but its enforcement and the opinions of local leadership vary. During regular worthiness interviews, church members—including preteens and teenagers— are required to confess any sexual sins like masturbation to church leaders in order to be deemed worthy to participate in the weekly sacrament or in temple ceremonies like baptisms for the dead. They are sometimes asked explicitly about masturbation. Church leaders are instructed that masturbation is not grounds for holding a church membership council. Masturbation is potential grounds for informal church discipline from a leader of a local congregation such as a bishop. Potential disciplinary restrictions include temporarily losing access to temples and/or a ban from receiving the weekly sacrament. The church's website contains numerous mentions of masturbation in a negative light. (Note: Examples include: "Getting Help"; "Other Safety Practices"; "Professional Treatment Information"; "Finally Understanding the Savior’s Grace Helped Me Overcome Pornography"; "Does My Spouse Have a Pornography Problem?"; "What Do I Do If I Discover My Spouse Has a Problem with Pornography?"; "Teenagers and Pornography Addiction: Treating the Silent Epidemic"; "How to Talk to Your Kids about Intimacy"; "Be Humble, Honest, Seek Truth")

== Range of teachings ==
In their overview on the topic, Mark Mallan and Vern Bullough describe Mormon community attitudes and teachings on masturbation as having gone through four major stages while various official church publications and new opinions of leaders have emerged throughout the church's history:

1. Silence, from 1830 to the first public statements
2. Secular Conformity, characterized by following popular medical opinion ranging from viewing masturbation as unhealthy to harmless
3. Counterrevolution, opposing modern medical views and scientific data
4. Emerging Reform, indicated by Mormon literature suggesting that masturbation may be normal and not immoral

Summary of church teachings on masturbation
Topic	Statements
Descriptors	Self-abuse, self-pollution, onanism, damnable & pernicious, strongly against it, problem, reprehensible sin, condemned by divine edict & leads souls to hell, abnormal, unnatural & unnecessary, weakness & habit, should be abandoned, common indiscretion, spiritually parasitic, unhealthy coping mechanism, condemned, slavery to the flesh, not all right, transgression & displeasing to the Lord, perversion, unholy & impure practice, forbidden, unworthy, misuse of divine & sacred power of procreation, highly addictive, to be avoided, immoral
Effects	Insanity & early death, souls eaten up with passion, psychological damage, guilt & depression, homosexuality, social-emotional isolation & erotic obsession, deviant behavior, heartache & a withholding of Holy Ghost's spiritual blessing (e.g. peace, comfort, happiness), detracts from the spiritual growth, serious emotional & spiritual consequences, loneliness, psychological dependency, becoming carnal
Motivations	Sexual abuse, loneliness, low self-esteem & poor self-control, curiosity, reinforced by pornography coping with pain (e.g. loneliness, rejection, abuse, frustration, anger, or boredom), mask distressing emotions
Prevention	Imagine bathing in worms, children's sexual interests should be guided not inhibited, fasting, prayer & staying busy, exercise, keeping a Book of Mormon held in hand at night, limiting bathroom time, praying to stop masturbating, tie hand to bed frame, end friendships with others who masturbate, read church books, serving others, report to bishop, develop coping mechanisms for stress & loneliness, exercise

== Research on sex and masturbation among LDS members ==
Data indicate a range of views by members on the morality of masturbation, and varied rates of self-reporting of having masturbated. Between 1950 and 1972, a survey of over 8,000 LDS-identified university students with frequent church attendance found 57% of men and 64% of women reported they did not think masturbation was immoral, in opposition to church teachings. The survey also found 78% of church-going Mormon men and 27% of active Mormon women reported having masturbated, with 50% of Mormon males and 11% of active Mormon females reporting recent masturbation. A 1995 survey of over 100 married LDS women found the majority (54%) reported having masturbated at some point, and 43% reported recent masturbation. For comparison, a study by church university sociologists published in 1992 found the majority (58%) of 1,000 LDS teen women surveyed self-reported having had sex before marriage, "indicat[ing] that a majority do not measure up to the Church's standard". According to LDS clinical psychologist Romel Mackelprang, LDS men often discuss masturbation "as though almost all boys have masturbated", while LDS women "are far more likely to display embarrassment and guilt about masturbation."

A study of thousands of university students by BYU sociology professor Wilford E. Smith spanning 1950-1972 found these statistics for male (blue) and female (pink) Mormon subjects who reported consistent LDS church attendance.

Based on the surveys of LDS students and married women spanning 1950 to 1995 along with a 2001 survey of 55 active LDS individuals, the summary in Mallan and Bullough's 2005 review stated the data indicate a majority of LDS Church member's attitudes and behavior are "at odds with the modern church policy of [masturbation] abstinence." Self-reported masturbation rates, in opposition to church leaders' teachings, were somewhat lower in a 2019 survey, and the survey did not ask participants on whether they believed masturbation to be immoral. Mallan and Bullough's 2005 review also stated the mandatory confessional confessional process of worthiness interviews in the church appears to increase the potential for psychosexual shame among members.

The self-reported numbers in a 2019 survey of over 1,700 LDS people found 31% of current, unmarried members and 53% of former members had masturbated before marriage. One LDS therapist believed the self-reported numbers were too low, and underreporting due to the social-desirability bias is a common issue even among anonymous surveys of many stigmatized sexual behaviors.

=== Research among general population ===
Despite well-documented individual, relational, and health benefits, sexual self-stimulation remains understudied in comparison to partnered sex, and has been stigmatized especially for women. A large 2019 survey found 78% of American women and 91% of US men masturbate. Other studies report most American adults have masturbated, with a 2009 survey of nearly 6,000 people finding that over half of men ages 16 to 59 and over 40% of women ages 20 to 29 reported masturbating in the past month. Global studies in other countries like China, Australia, and Croatia find masturbation is prevalent throughout the world.

== Timeline of teachings and events ==
Below is a timeline of events, publications, and speeches on the topic of masturbation in the LDS community.

=== 1800s ===
- 1871 – First Presidency member Daniel H. Wells told a group of church leaders that many of their young men had a masturbation habit (called "self-abuse", "self-pollution", and "onanism") that was a great sin and would prevent marriage and lead to insanity and an early death.
- 1883 – The First Presidency and apostles spoke at length with stake presidents about the "self-pollution of both sexes" in the first Mormon reference to female masturbation.

=== Early 1900s ===
- 1902 – In response to reports of many students at church schools masturbating, church president Joseph F. Smith stated that masturbation was a "damnable and pernicious practice" and that all top leaders should be strongly against it. He stated that stake leaders should instruct and warn their congregations about it.
- 1902 – The Seventy J. Golden Kimball wrote to his cousin Elias S. Kimball that they should not confront their pre-teen sons about their "self-abuse", and stated that children's souls "are eaten up with passion."
- 1920s and 1930s – During this time top leaders made lessons that warned parents against causing emotional distress in adolescents by overreacting to their children's masturbatory behaviors and referred them to secular books which taught that sexual interests in children and adolescents should be guided and directed and not inhibited.

=== 1950s ===
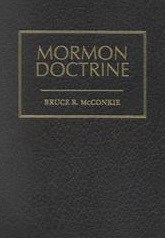
Bruce McConkie's 1958 book was the first major publication outlining church teachings on masturbation.

- 1952 – Apostle J. Reuben Clark stated that those who teach that "self-pollution" (a now obsolete dysphemism for masturbation) is non-sinful are as bad as "the teachers who prostitute the sex urge".
- 1953 – Alarmed by the results found in the Kinsey reports, Brigham Young University president Ernest Wilkinson appointed two faculty committees to tackle the "masturbation problem" on the church school's campus.
- 1954 – A speech at BYU by the apostle Spencer W. Kimball was published by BYU as a booklet "Be Ye Clean", and later by Deseret Book in 1970. In the speech and both print versions Kimball stated that masturbation and a preoccupation about sex in one's thoughts was a reprehensible sin. The pamphlet was given to missionaries.
- 1958 – Apostle Bruce R. McConkie spoke strongly against masturbation in his Mormon Doctrine, saying it was "condemned by divine edict" and among the "chief means" the devil uses "leading souls to hell". He also stated when psychiatrists tell their patients experiencing a serious "guilt complex" from masturbation that it is "not an evil" this keeps the patient from complying with the law of chastity and becoming clean, which would lead to "mental and spiritual peace" that helps one cope with or resolve mental disorders.

=== 1960s ===
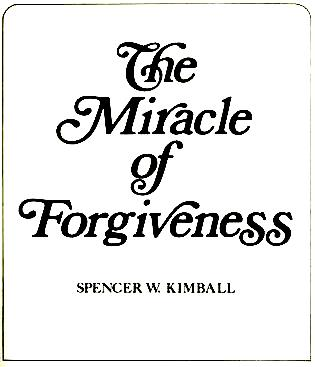
Kimball addressed masturbation numerous times as a leader, including in this influential 1969 publication.

- 1964 – In an address at BYU to instructors of religion Kimball refuted the statements of physicians and others to young Mormon men that masturbation was normal, natural, or necessary.
- 1965 – Apostle Spencer W. Kimball gave a BYU address in which he called masturbation a "common indiscretion"
- 1966 – Apostle Delbert L. Stapley told BYU students to avoid "perversions" like masturbation. He further stated that before receiving temple endowments or serving an LDS mission that this "weakness" and "habit" should be abandoned.
- 1967 – Apostle Kimball gave an April general conference address in which he compared sexual sins like masturbation to the leaves and twigs of a spiritually parasitic mistletoe plant that grows with every indiscretion.
- 1967 – A proposed update to the BYU Honor Code banning "masturbation" was removed in committee.
- 1968 – Popular Mormon author and later mission president Lindsay Curtis coauthored a book published by the church's Deseret Book which called masturbation an indication of emotional immaturity and an unhealthy coping mechanism which can cause psychological damage. The book further stated that it stems from loneliness, low self-esteem, and poor self-control, and that the habit can be broken by fasting, prayer, and staying busy.
- 1969 – Apostle Kimball wrote several paragraphs on masturbation in the Miracle of Forgiveness, stating that ancient and modern prophets "condemn masturbation" and that it shows "slavery to the flesh".

=== 1970s ===
- 1970 – In a missionary guide a section was included called "Steps to Overcome Masturbation" written by apostle Mark E. Petersen. The guide, reprinted in a 1973 church packet, recommended exercise, keeping a Book of Mormon held in hand at night, limiting time in the bathroom, and praying for help to stop masturbating. Petersen instructed readers that in "very severe cases it may be necessary to tie a hand to the bed frame" to prevent masturbation. It states masturbation is a difficulty which robs one of the Spirit, separates a person from God, defeats the gospel plan, causes a loss of self-respect and feelings of guilt and depressions, creates emotional stress, and is a totally self-centered, and secretive habit. He provided means of curing the habit by a determined decision to avoid being alone, shorten showers, wear tight, protective clothing for sleeping, eat a snack as a distraction, and keep the topic out of ones mind.
- 1972 – The Relief Society Courses of Study book stated that, "As boys and girls reach physical maturity, curiosity in one's body may result in self-stimulation (masturbation)."
- 1974 – The Relief Society Courses of Study book update contained an example conversation between mother and child where the child asks, "What's wrong with playing with my body? The other kids says it's okay." The mother responds, "Your body is sacred and you know more about your eternal potential than the other kids. Many so-called experts say that masturbation is all right, but it is not. The Lord expects us to use self-control."

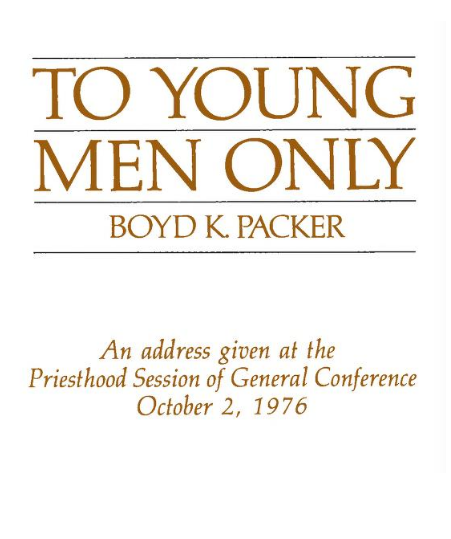
The pamphlet reprint of Packer's 1976 General Conference address on masturbation.

- 1976 – One of the lengthiest public discussions of masturbation by an apostle was Boyd K. Packer's October general conference address "To Young Men Only", in which he uses a "little factory" euphemism to discuss male reproductive organs and warns young men not to tamper with the factory lest it speed up and become a guilt- and depression-inducing habit that is not easy to resist. He gave vigorous exercise as a method to help control thoughts and break the habit of masturbation since it is a "transgression" that is "not pleasing to the Lord". The talk was printed as a pamphlet and widely distributed by the church from 1980 to 2016. The controversial address was also scrubbed from the church's website.
- 1976 – BYU sociology professor Wilford Smith published his study of thousands of students spanning 1950 to 1972. He found that 64% of active Mormon females and 57% of active Mormon males did not believe that masturbation was immoral.
- 1979 – LDS Family Services office director, David Albrecht, gave a Washington D.C. stake seminar presentation which offered suggestions for curbing masturbation by taking cool brief showers, keeping ones bladder empty, and reducing the amount of spices and condiments in ones food.

=== 1980s ===
- 1980 – The Association of Mormon Counselors and Psychotherapists (AMCAP) printed an article by a bishop and sociology professor discussing his counseling techniques to help a BYU student in his ward decrease his masturbation frequency.
- 1980 – Church president Spencer W. Kimball gave an address calling masturbation a "reprehensible sin."

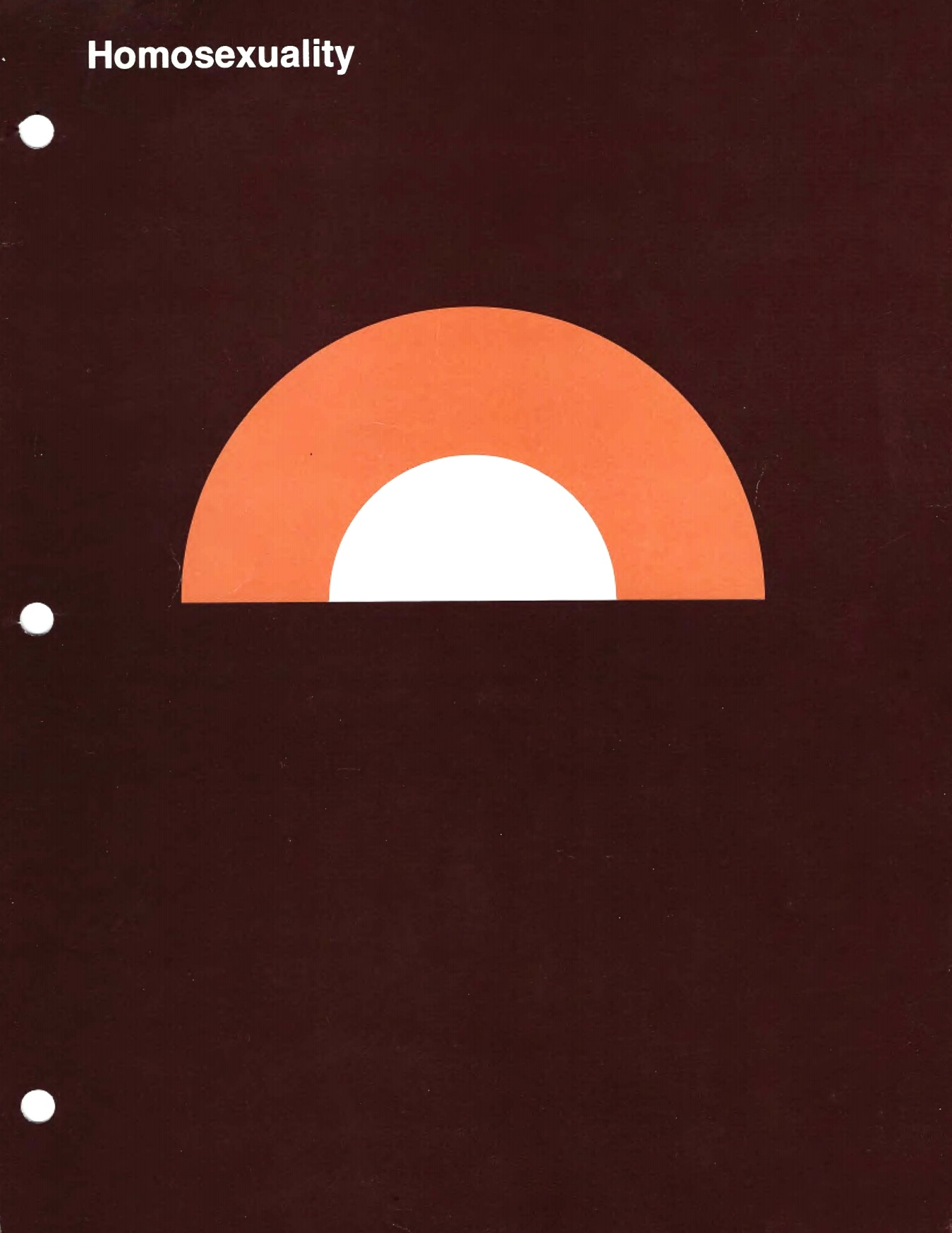
Cover of a 1981 church manual which gave bishops steps to help churchgoers stop masturbating.

- 1981 – A manual for bishops on attempting to "cure" homosexual LDS adherents was released. It listed masturbation as a cause of homosexuality, and contained steps on how leaders could help those in their congregations stop masturbating. These included asking them when, where, and how often they masturbate, and having them break off friendships with other people who also masturbate. Other ideas included reading church books, praying, fasting, serving others, regular accountability with the bishop, developing healthy coping mechanisms for stress and loneliness, and exercising. The manual received media attention in 2017.
- 1981 – Church leaders funded the writing of a book on sexuality and sent every bishop and stake president a copy. The book was written by Church Welfare Services director Victor L. Brown Junior and stated that habitual masturbation will cause social-emotional isolation and erotic obsession.
- 1981 – Mark Petersen's "Steps in Overcoming Masturbation: A Guide To Self Control" was distributed to branch presidents at the Provo, Utah Missionary Training Center.
- 1983 – In October an LDS psychiatrist Cantril Nielsen paid a death malpractice settlement to Eugene Eliason for prescribing that his patient 16-year-old Kip Eliason abstain from masturbation as directed by his bishop. This allegedly contributed to the patient's shame-induced suicide on 2 March 1982 over his inability to stop masturbating as recorded in his journal.
- 1983 – Then President of the Twelve Ezra Taft Benson stated in the October general conference that priesthood holders are virtuous and don't masturbate.
- 1984 – The Ensign published an article referencing a 1965 research article which stated that, "such sexual activity as masturbation, homosexuality, exhibitionism, and voyeurism can be prompted and reinforced by pornography. A number of studies I have reviewed suggest that persistent deviant sexual fantasies frequently lead later to deviant behavior."
- 1985 – The church began providing a manual for parents to use in discussing sexuality with their children. The manual includes statements that "prophets have condemned [masturbation] as a sin" and "perversion of the body's passions" that causes one to "become carnal".
- 1985 – This edition of the Relief Society Courses of Study book stated that fathers should, "caution their young sons about how masturbation detracts from the spiritual growth," and that parents should teach their children that the Lord has clearly told us to refrain from masturbation.
- 1985 – The Ensign published an article stating that music producers have gradually added more sexual perversions to their music including, "homosexuality, transvestism, sodomy, masturbation, sadomasochism, rape, prostitution, venereal disease, child abuse, and incest."
- 1986 – Church seventy Theodore Burton stated in an address to the BYU student body that pornography leads to masturbation and is an evil that takes a considerable amount of time to repent of.
- 1986 – A BYU professor at BYU published a book which stated that allowing any degree of sexual arousal in oneself prior to marriage was a moral sin.
- 1986 – Male adults and young men were told that a virtuous LDS priesthood holder does not practice "self-abuse" (i.e. masturbation) or any other sexual perversion by church president Ezra Taft Benson in the October general conference.
- 1987 – Church seventy Theodore Burton stated in a BYU-wide address that marriage infidelity can often start with "personal indulgences based on selfishness" such as viewing pornography which, "leads to self-abuse, homosexuality, fornication, adultery, child and spouse abuse, incest, rape, and cruelty."
- 1988 – In the church guide "Handbook for Families" BYU professor Lynn Scoresby advised parents to "Teach that self-abuse will result in loss of self-esteem and feelings of self-doubt" in reference to masturbation.

=== 1990s ===
The 1990 edition of the "For the Strength of Youth" pamphlet explicitly forbade masturbation.

- 1990 – An edition of the church's youth guidelines pamphlet was released stating that the "Lord specifically forbids ... masturbation". It also stated that violating this moral law would cause guilt, sin, heartache and withhold blessing of peace, comfort, and happiness from the Holy Ghost.
- 1992 – In a guide for bishops the Church called masturbation a deviant behavior linked to homosexuality, and stated that it makes it more difficult to cease same-sex sexual behavior. It characterized regular masturbation as an addiction that was difficult to quit.
- 1994 – An Ensign article stated that parents should teach their children about correct moral choices and standards taught by the First Presidency like that the Lord specifically forbids masturbation.
- 1995 – Another study on the masturbation habits of LDS individuals was released in which 43% of the 103 active, married, church-attending LDS women interviewed reported recent masturbation.
- 1997 – In the church-published Family Home Evening Resource Book fathers were instructed to caution their male children against self-stimulation, and that the 1976 pamphlet "To Young Men Only" could help.

=== 2000s ===
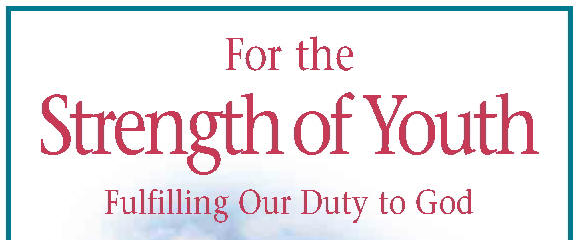
The 2001 update to the youth guideline pamphlet removed the explicit reference to masturbation, but alludes to it.

- 2000 – In its Sunday lesson manual for young and adult men, the LDS Church published that the law of chastity forbids "improper uses of the divine power of procreation," and that, "Among the other ways man misuses this sacred power are fornication (including living together without marriage), homosexuality, abortion, and masturbation."
- 2000 – Popular LDS writer, bishop, and BYU professor Brad Wilcox released a book Growing Up: Gospel Answers about Maturation and Sex sold by the church's book company in which he stated that masturbation causes serious emotional and spiritual consequences.
- 2000 – An Ensign article re-emphasized the teachings of the 1990 "For the Strength of Youth" pamphlet which states that the Lord specifically forbids masturbation.
- 2000 – A female BYU graduate was quoted in a book stating that she had experienced a lot of guilt around her masturbation growing up in a devout LDS family.
- 2001 – A new edition of the "For the Strength of Youth" pamphlet was released alluding to masturbation with statements forbidding anything that "arouses" any sexual feelings or emotions in one's "own body".
- 2003 – The apostle Packer again addressed masturbation while discussing sexual mores stating, "there are cravings and temptations, and there can be habitual self-stimulation, and a lot of things that are just unworthy."
- 2004 – LDS Family Services releases "A Practitioner's Guide: Addiction to Masturbation and Pornography" on how LDS therapists can help clients stop masturbating.
- 2006 – LDS author Carol Lynn Pearson published a book in which she quoted a gay LDS man who said he died inside at age twelve over guilt and shame for his occasional masturbation.

=== 2010s ===
- 2010 – The Church Handbook for leaders states that the three bishopric members should ensure that youth in their congregations from ages 12 to 17 are interviewed twice a year, and that during those one-on-one they are to discuss the "importance of obeying the commandments, particularly ... refraining from any kind of sexual activity, and refraining from viewing, reading, or listening to pornographic material." Additionally, leaders are told to "ensures that the discussion does not encourage curiosity or experimentation." It also states that disciplinary council should not be called for adherents "who are struggling with pornography or self-abuse."
- 2011 – An update to the "For the Strength of Youth" pamphlet contained the same wording against masturbation from the 2001 edition.
- 2011 – In the Ensign an LDS neurosurgeon is quoted saying viewing pornography and "the accompanying act of self-stimulation may not seem horribly bad at first," but that, "you may not believe you are addicted until it is too late."
- 2013 – Seventy Tad R. Callister stated in a 2013 speech at BYU-I that God condemns self-abuse which he clarifies stating, "Self-abuse is the act of stimulating the procreative power of one's own body." The speech was reprinted in the March 2014 Ensign.
- 2014 – Mark Petersen's masturbation prevention guide was shared on the US national television show Real Time with Bill Maher.
- 2015 – The church published two anonymous accounts related to masturbation in March. One was by a married woman navigating what she termed her husband's addiction to pornography and masturbation and the relapses he had. The other was of a man who stated that he became addicted to masturbation at the age of 12, and as a married man became paralyzed from the neck down and was still addicted so he sought the help of the LDS Addiction Recovery Program and stated that he had been "sober" from masturbating for one year.
- 2016 – In a recent BYU campus-wide address on suppressing and changing sexually impure thoughts, BYU administrator Jeffery Bunker quoted Benson stating that virtuous priesthood holders do not practice "self-abuse" (i.e. masturbation).
- 2017 – The LDS Church website published an anonymous account of a woman's experience with what she describes as an addiction to masturbation and pornography that began as a girl and continued as a problem as a married woman. The account includes her repentance consultations with a bishop and LDS counselor and describes a later relapse and involvement with the LDS Addiction Recovery Program.
- 2017 – The Ensign published an article in which an LDS Family Services employee stated that survivors of sexual abuse may, "become promiscuous to seek nurturing through sexual activity (including pornography and self-stimulation)."
- 2017 – LDS Living, a magazine published by the church's Deseret Book publishing, features an article stating, "Although the term 'masturbation' hasn't formally been used in a general conference talk since the 1970s, there are current Church publications that clearly teach that masturbation isn't necessary and is even considered sinful," and that it "can lead to loneliness and isolation." It also states that masturbation is "highly addictive" and leads to selfishly focus on one's own pleasure and comfort.
- 2017 – At a Sunstone presentation one married LDS man stated that after his bishop recommended he attend LDS Addiction Recovery Services in order to stop his occasional masturbation he became hopeless as the program wasn't helping and decided he needed to castrate himself in order to end all sexual feelings and alleviate his guilt, though, lack of money for a trip to a foreign doctor prevented his plans until he changed his mind.
- 2017 – In an Ensign article BYU professor Mark Butler taught that adolescents can use masturbation to replace or mask distressing emotions, and that this risks psychological dependency on the behavior to manage life stresses.
- 2017 – An episode of HBO's television series Room 104 focused on a fictional story of two male Mormon missionaries masturbating to a pornographic film.
- 2017 – Sam Young, a former bishop, gathered thousands of petition signatures and protested at Temple Square over the church's practice of bishops asking sexual questions about topics such as masturbation to minors during interviews behind closed doors.{{}} He gathered personal accounts from thousands of current and former church participants who said the youth interviews caused them distress, and some were driven to consider or even attempt suicide because of the shame they felt as a result of probing questions about masturbation, pornography, or sexual activity. He was later excommunicated from the church.
- 2017 – A church spokesperson released a statement on bishop's interviews in response to the petition which says, that bishops are "counseled to not be unnecessarily probing or invasive in their questions."
- 2018 – The BBC stated in an article that in the LDS Church "pornography and masturbation are banned," and quoted two Mormons who said they were taught masturbation was "satanic" and "just below murder."
- 2018 – A first-hand account of an experience with masturbation interviews growing up in the LDS Church was published by KUTV. In it Kip described his experience as a 13-year-old of confessing masturbation to his bishop. His bishop then had him confess to his father and then mother. Much later, a different bishop gave him the paper "Steps In Overcoming Masturbation" attributed to the LDS apostle Mark E. Petersen, which recommended aversive techniques such as imagining bathing in and eating worms while masturbating in order to stop. Kip stated that all of this made him feel he was disgusting and awful for masturbating and he reported feeling depression and self-loathing.
- 2018 – Another first-hand experience with masturbation interviews was published by KUTV in which a woman stated that during her teens three separate bishops had asked her sexually explicit questions during one-on-one interviews including about masturbation, and that these contributed to her repulsion and shame for her body.
- 2018 – An LDS bishop (now former bishop) was charged with inappropriately touching and frequently discussing masturbation with several teens.
- 2019 – An updated version of the Missionary Handbook was released specifically mentioning masturbation and arousing sexual feelings.

=== 2020s ===
- 2020 – The new General Handbook for leaders stated that masturbation is not grounds for holding a church membership council. However, a church membership council may be appropriate when there has been "intensive or compulsive use of pornography that has caused significant harm to a member's marriage or family".
- 2020 – The August 2020 Ensign teaches that masturbation is contrary to God's command. It says parents should teach children "God's commandment that sexual behavior occur within a marriage relationship, while also not reacting with disgust or anger when children engage in self-touching or youth admit to masturbating."
- 2021 – A short film about an LDS missionary confessing to masturbating and viewing pornography won jury award for US fiction at the Sundance Film Festival in Utah. The film's director stated, "I had a mission president that scared me a lot. I never masturbated my whole mission, because I was terrified. I said '... I don’t want to have to talk to this guy about this.'"
- 2021 – Church spokesperson Eric Hawkins stated the church condemns pornography in any form and sees masturbation as immoral.
- 2021 – Therapist Natasha Helfer Parker was excommunicated from the church in part because of publicly expressing her belief that masturbation was not a sin.
- 2021 – An Australian public broadcasting (SBS) editor stated, "There was a time when I was just so ashamed. Queerness and things like masturbation, things like porn, and all that stuff were so demonized within [the LDS Church], ... And that can have a really harmful effect on a person."
- 2024 – In a church form titled "Relapse Analysis" for members who had viewed pornography again, a question asks if they had masturbated as a result of their recent viewing of pornography.
