= Great and abominable church =

Church described in the Book of Mormon

In the Latter Day Saint movement, the great and abominable church (also called the great whore of all the earth) is a church described in the Book of Mormon and other revelations by Joseph Smith. The great and abominable church is identified as being synonymous with the Whore of Babylon described in chapter 17 of the Book of Revelation. Although many Latter Day Saints have associated the great and abominable church with the Catholic Church, official publications of the Church of Jesus Christ of Latter-day Saints (LDS Church) have discouraged this interpretation.

== Usage in the Book of Mormon ==
The canonical Doctrine and Covenants refers to the great and abominable church as both "the church of the devil" and the "whore of Babylon".

In a reprint of an Ensign article in Journal of Book of Mormon Studies, Stephen E. Robinson identifies six aspects of great and abominable church in the text of Nephi's vision in 1 Nephi 13. It persecutes and slays members of the church, seeks financial profit, is sexually immoral, takes important information out of the scriptures, has political power over the earth, and will be destroyed in a war. The great and abominable church is often equated with Babylon. Robinson finds five of the six characteristics from 1 Nephi attributed to Babylon in the Book of Revelation: persecuting members of the church, seeking material gain, sexual immorality, having political power, and being destroyed by the kings who make war against "the Lamb."

== Interpretation of the term as referring to the Catholic Church ==
The first edition of LDS Church general authority Bruce R. McConkie's Mormon Doctrine (1958) referenced the Catholic Church as "great and abominable" multiple times. Members of LDS Church leadership under president David O. McKay disapproved of Mormon Doctrine, and made McConkie promise not to publish a second edition. However, McConkie published a second edition in 1966, which softened some, but not all of the problems church leaders identified in the first edition.

Neil J. Young stated that McConkie's definition of the Catholic Church as the great and abominable church in Mormon Doctrine was uncontroversial with members because it was something that most members already believed. He subsequently stated that when Nephi sees priests clothed in "gold, and silver, and silks, and the scarlets, and fine-twined linen, and all manner of precious clothing", it is a direct allusion to the Catholic Church. According to Stephen H. Webb, a Catholic theologian, the "great and abominable church" was commonly identified by early Mormons as the Catholic Church, but Nephi's original vision was not anti-Catholic. It was primarily concerned with warning believers not to "fall away from the truth".

== LDS interpretations after the publication of Mormon Doctrine ==
Official LDS publications discourage the identification of the great and abominable church with the Catholic Church, as well as with any other specific religion, denomination or organization. According to a 1988 article by Stephen E. Robinson in Ensign, an official magazine of LDS Church, "no single known historical church, denomination, or set of believers meets all the requirements for the great and abominable church. ... Rather, the role of Babylon has been played by many different agencies, ideologies, and churches in many different times. The article was reprinted in Journal of Book of Mormon Studies. Robinson argues for the idea that the "great and abominable church" is historical in 1 Nephi 13 and typological in 1 Nephi 14. For Robinson, because of the phrase "most abominable above all other churches," the references in 1 Nephi 13 must apply to a specific church, but concludes that no known church thus far fulfills all the requirements described in Nephi's vision. In a similar vein, the semi-official Encyclopedia of Mormonism states: "Though many Protestants, following the lead of Martin Luther, have linked this evil force described in Revelation 17 with the Roman Catholic church, the particular focus of these LDS and New Testament scriptures seems rather to be on earlier agents of apostasy in the Jewish and Christian traditions".

Fatimah Salleh and Margaret Olsen Hemming, in their commentary The Book of Mormon for the Least of These, published by BCC Press, advocate for a reading that identifies the "abominable church" as an archetype, a force that "worships wealth" and "oppresses the saints of God." Salleh and Hemming identify these forces in slavery, colonialism, war, human trafficking, sweatshops, and mass incarceration.

== See also ==
- Mormon folklore
