= To Young Men Only =

1976 speech

Cover of the 1980 pamphlet, which printed the sermon.

"To Young Men Only" (also known as "Message to Young Men") is a sermon delivered by Latter-day Saint apostle Boyd K. Packer on October 2, 1976, at the priesthood session of the 146th Semiannual General Conference of the Church of Jesus Christ of Latter-day Saints (LDS Church). The sermon is addressed to young men of the Aaronic priesthood (ages 12 to 18) and discusses issues of human sexuality, puberty, and morality. From 1980 to 2016, the sermon was published as a pamphlet by the LDS Church. It has been criticized in several publications for allegedly encouraging violence against homosexuals. In 2016, the church discontinued the pamphlet.

== Content ==
Packer described his remarks as matters that "fathers should discuss with their sons." Packer stated that "because some young men do not have fathers and because some fathers (and some bishops) do not know how to proceed", he would be addressing sensitive subjects. The sermon compares the male reproductive system to a "little factory" and teaches that masturbation, use of pornography, and homosexual activities are immoral and forbidden by God. It encourages young male Latter-day Saints to "vigorously resist" homosexual advances, even with violence, if necessary. Packer teaches that nocturnal emission is natural and designed by God and that young men "should not feel guilty" when it happens. The sermon also offers suggestions on how to control one's thoughts and resist temptation.

== Publication ==
Unlike most general conference sermons, "Message to Young Men" was not published in the church's official magazine, The Ensign. Instead, the sermon was published in 1980 as a 14-page pamphlet, entitled "To Young Men Only", that was available for church leaders to distribute to members.

In 2016, the pamphlet was discontinued and it was removed from the LDS Church's website. The video of the sermon is no longer available on the LDS Church's website as of August 2019.

== Criticism ==
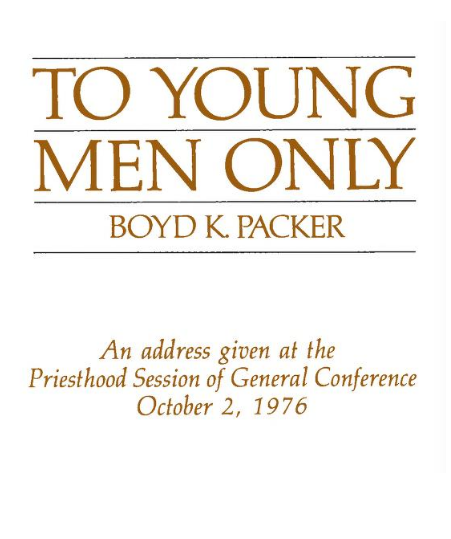
Packer's conference address published here has been criticized for condoning anti-gay violence.

One controversial part of the sermon states that some men entice others to join them in sexual behaviors and gives an example of a missionary who punched ("floored") his gay companion, to which Packer responded, "Somebody had to do it". Packer then continued “I am not recommending that course to you, but I am not omitting it. You must protect yourself.” In the original broadcast, the audience is heard laughing after the statement "somebody had to do it".

In 2001, gay Mormon historian D. Michael Quinn described the sermon as "[t]he low point in the Mormon hierarchy's homophobia since the 1950s"; Quinn argued that Packer's words constituted an endorsement of gay bashing and that the church itself endorsed such behavior by continuing to publish Packer's speech.

In 2000 and 2001, David E. Hardy, a Salt Lake City lawyer who is the father of a gay son, criticized the sermon for "demoniz[ing]" gays and implying that "homosexuality is a matter of choice".

In 2014, Samantha Allen, a columnist for The Daily Beast, wrote that the sermon "typifies organized religion’s approach to curtailing male masturbation", calling it "deeply paternalistic" and criticizing it for employing "a noxious mixture of condescension and euphemism".

== See also ==
- Christian views on masturbation
- "God Loveth His Children"
- Homophobia
- Homosexuality and The Church of Jesus Christ of Latter-day Saints
- Masturbation and The Church of Jesus Christ of Latter-day Saints
