= Sexuality and the Church of Jesus Christ of Latter-day Saints =

Teachings on human sexuality in the Church of Jesus Christ of Latter-day Saints (LDS Church) are deeply rooted in its doctrine. In its standard for sexual behavior, called the law of chastity, the church's leaders ban all premarital sex, all homosexual sexual activity, the viewing of pornography, masturbation, overtly sexual kissing, sexual dancing, and sexual touch outside of a heterosexual marriage. LDS theology teaches that gender is defined in premortal life, and that part of the purpose of mortal life is for men and women to be sealed together in heterosexual marriages, progress eternally after death as gods together, and produce spiritual children in the afterlife. The church states that sexual relations within the framework of monogamous opposite-sex marriage are healthy, necessary, and approved by God. The LDS denomination of Mormonism places great emphasis on the sexual behavior of Mormon adherents, as a commitment to follow the law of chastity is required for baptism, adherence is required to receive a temple recommend, and is part of the temple endowment ceremony covenants that devout participants promise by oath to keep.

== Law of Chastity ==
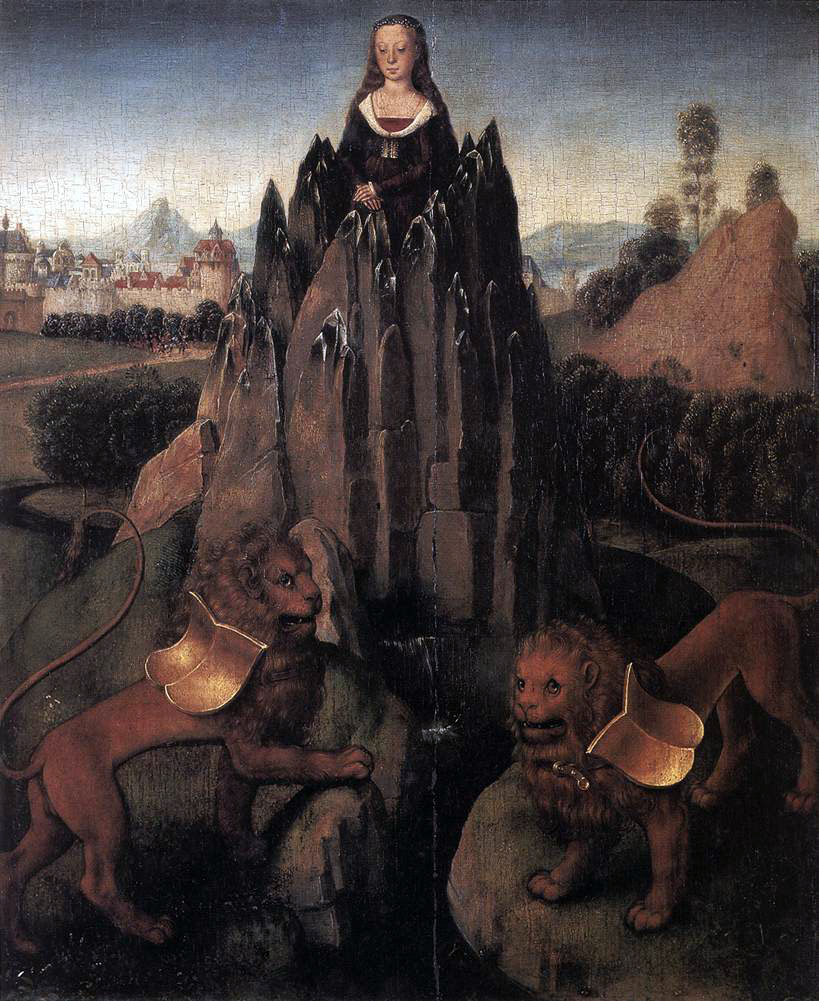
Two lions with shields guard a woman in this allegorical painting of chastity from 1490.

The LDS Church teaches its members to obey the law of chastity, which is a code of morality and modesty. Under this code, all members are taught to be "morally clean in their thoughts, words, and actions" and to abstain from pornography. Violations of this code include all premarital sex, all homosexual sexual activity, the viewing of pornography, overtly sexual kissing, dancing, and touch outside marriage and masturbation.

Though celestial marriage is the only form of marriage recognized as a sacrament, the church permits sex within government-recognized marital unions, the notable exceptions being same-sex marriage, common law marriage, civil unions (in jurisdictions where marriage is available), and polygamy. The church is sensitive about its historical relationship with polygamy, and entry into a polygamous marriage, even where legal, will result in mandatory consideration of church discipline and possible excommunication. The law of chastity includes standards of modesty in dress, grooming, and appearance which have varied according to cultural norms of the time. Serious offenses of the law of chastity may result in church discipline, including the possibility of excommunication. Penalties from church leaders are stiffer for same-sex sexual sins than for heterosexual ones in matters of general church discipline, missionary requirements, and code of conduct enforcement at church-run universities.

=== Teachings on importance ===
Church leaders have emphasized its importance. When discussing premarital sex in his book The Miracle of Forgiveness the apostle (and later church president) Spencer W. Kimball quoted church president David O. McKay in stating, "Your virtue is worth more than your life. Please, young folk, preserve your virtue even if you lose your lives." In the book Mormon Doctrine the apostle Bruce R. McConkie wrote in the section "Chastity" that it is better to be "dead clean, than alive unclean" and that many Mormon parents would rather their child "come back in a pine box with [their] virtue than return alive without it". It was a highly influential all-time bestseller in the LDS community, and was viewed by many members both then and now as representing official doctrine despite never being endorsed by the church.

=== Victims of sexual assault ===
Victims of rape, incest, or sexual abuse are not guilty of sin and are not considered to have broken the law of chastity. In a general conference address, Richard G. Scott stated, "The victim must do all in his or her power to stop the abuse. Most often, the victim is innocent because of being disabled by fear or the power or authority of the offender. At some point in time, however, the Lord may prompt a victim to recognize a degree of responsibility for abuse. Your priesthood leader will help assess your responsibility so that, if needed, it can be addressed." This statement was criticized by therapist Julie de Azevedo Hanks as reinforcing the likelihood that victims will mistake their abuse response for a spiritual prompting to repent. She further stated apportioning "responsibility" is "unrealistic and deeply harmful for someone who is in the aftermath of trauma", and causes a spiral into shame, and diverts survivors from putting the guilt on the abuser which she states is a crucial part of healing and justice.

== Pre-marital sex ==
Sex before and outside of a monogamous, heterosexual marriage is strictly forbidden by Mormon teachings. LDS teens have the highest rate of self-reported abstention from sexual activity of any US religious group surveyed in 2002 and 2024. The 2002 US survey also found LDS teens had the highest reported rates of supporting waiting for sex until marriage (77%) of any religious group, and the highest rates reporting their parents would be "extremely mad" if they had pre-marital sex (78%). A study by church university sociologists published in 1992 found that 60% of 1,000 LDS teen women surveyed reported having had sex before marriage. A smaller survey of 158 married LDS women in 1995 found that 32% reported having premarital sex.

== Soaking ==
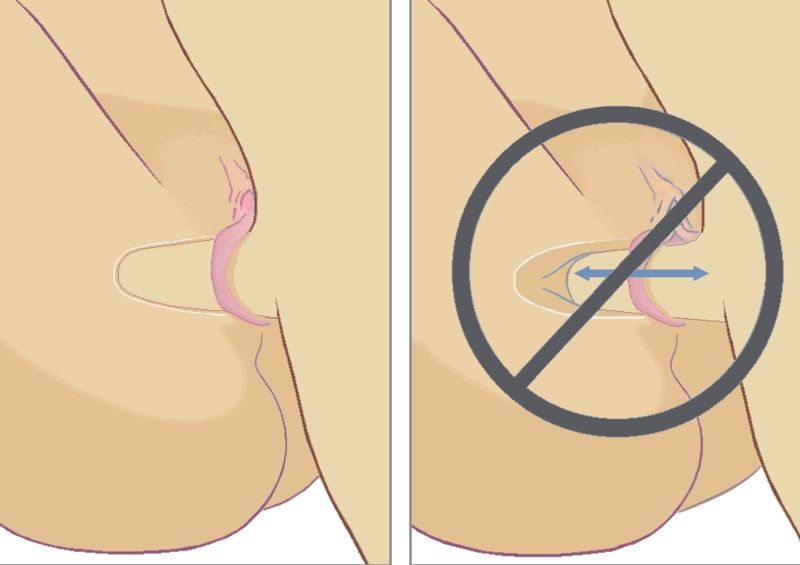
Illustration of "soaking" or the act of vaginal penetration without subsequent thrusting.

In 2021, reports of LDS Church members "soaking" (sexual insertion occurring, but without subsequent thrusting) as a workaround to the church's sexual restrictions made international news and received millions of views and social media tags. Many described the rumors as a myth while others stated that they knew people who had participated in the action. Other articles described a related act among LDS members of "jump humping" where two people soak while another jumps on the bed beside them. LDS soaking has been discussed on multiple American television series in the 2020s.

== Masturbation ==
On many occasions church leaders have taught that members should not masturbate as part of obedience to the law of chastity. The 1990 edition of the church's youth guidelines pamphlet which stated that the "Lord specifically forbids [...] masturbation", with the next two editions into 2022 alluding to it with statements forbidding anything that "arouses" any sexual feelings or emotions in one's "own body".

== Kissing ==
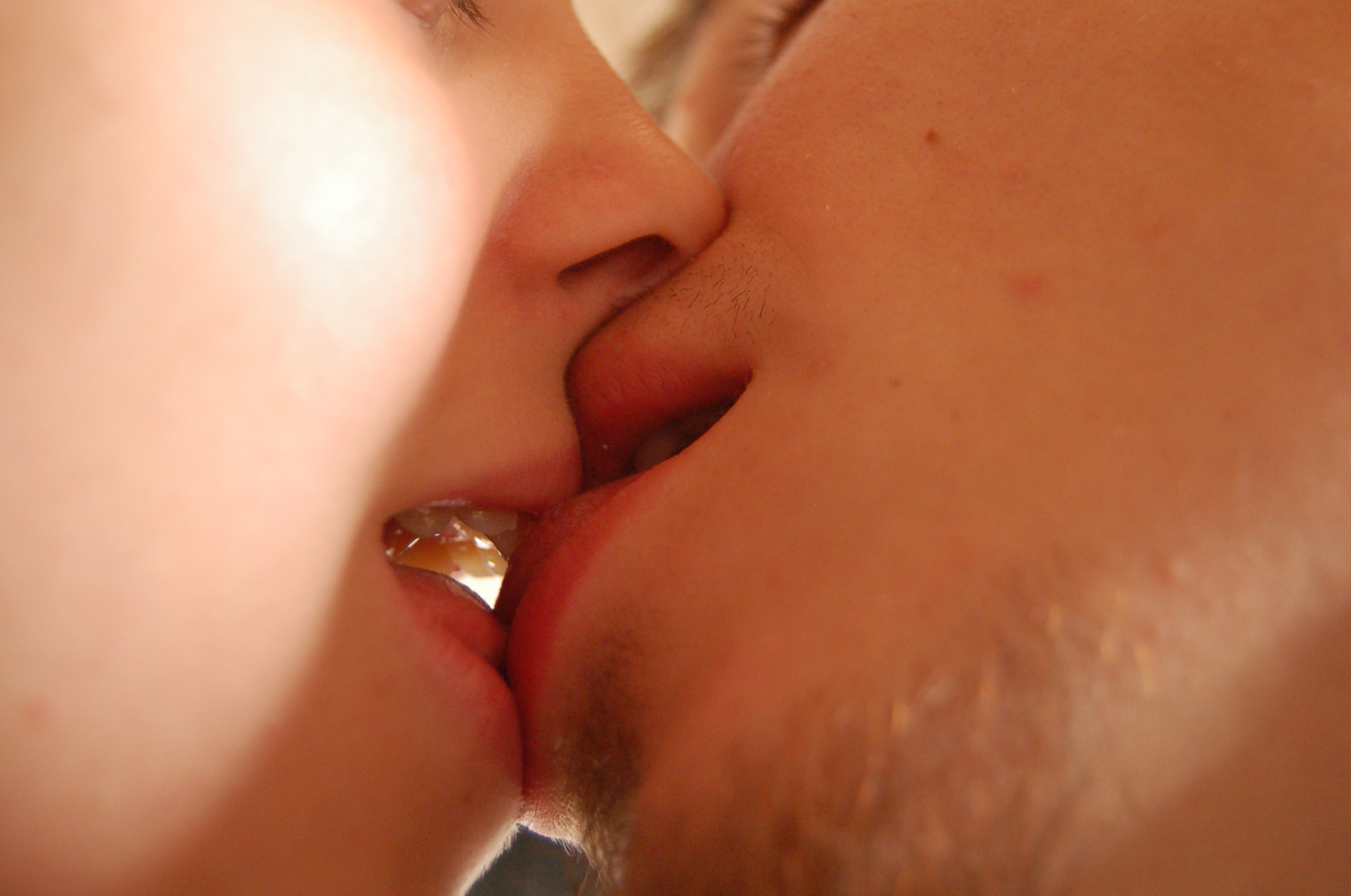
Two people kissing

Church leaders have stated that outside of marriage, prolonged and "passionate kisses" are off limits. For example, church president Spencer W. Kimball, called the "soul kiss" an "abomination" that leads to necking, petting, and "illegitimate babies". He further stated that even when dating for a time a kiss should be a "clean, decent, sexless one like the kiss between a mother and son". He also stated that kissing during casual dating is "asking for trouble" and that kisses should not be "handed out like pretzels". Apostle Richard G. Scott advised that physical expressions of romantic feelings between unmarried individuals should be kept to "those that are comfortable in the presence of your parents".

== Erotic touch ==
Church leaders have also condemned erotic touching outside of heterosexual marriage using terms like "necking" for general kissing and stroking of areas outside of the breasts, buttocks, or groin region, and "petting" for fondling another in private areas whether under or over clothing. Despite the policies on extramarital sex and making out, a 2007 survey of over 1,000 Brigham Young University (BYU) students showed that 4% of single women and 3% of single men had participated in oral sex or intercourse while dating. Additionally, 54% of men and 46% of women BYU students reported "making out and intense kissing" while dating.

== Oral sex ==
In the early 1980s, the church explicitly banned oral sex even for married couples as it was considered an "unnatural, impure, or unholy practice", which reflected verbiage for sexual misconduct in the church's General Handbook. In a January 5, 1982, First Presidency letter to bishops and other local leaders, it was explicitly stated that members who participated in any oral sex were barred from the temple unless they "repented and discontinued" this practice. In a popular book sold by the church's bookstore and cowritten by a BYU professor, the authors state that oral sex is unworthy and impure for married couples. An LDS magazine published a bishop's teaching in 2013 that oral sex was forbidden before marriage. Two BYU graduate LDS sex therapists, however, publicly stated in 2013 that oral sex was acceptable for married couples as did another LDS therapist in 2014.

== Pornography ==
LDS Church leaders have repeatedly condemned the use of sexually arousing literature and visual material for decades. Rhetoric has softened over time, however. They have compared pornography to a plague or epidemic that is overpoweringly addictive like hard drugs such as cocaine on multiple occasions. The church has also stated that viewing erotic material can become a habit that is "almost impossible to break" which can metaphorically "blast a crater" in the brain. The church hosts meetings and has a website to assist members who wish to curb their consumption of pornographic material, and has asked church members to attend an anti-pornography rally. Church leaders have also stated that women who dress immodestly become pornography to men around them.

The Church Handbook states that the three bishopric members should ensure that members from ages 12 to 17 are interviewed twice a year during which they are to discuss the "importance of obeying the commandments, particularly [...] refraining from any kind of sexual activity, and refraining from viewing, reading, or listening to pornographic material." It also states that disciplinary council should not be called for members "who are struggling with pornography or self-abuse."

=== Research ===
Sociological research into pornography and LDS individuals has included one BYU study that showed of 192 male BYU students ages 18–27, 100% of the sample considered viewing pornography "unacceptable". However, 35% reported having used pornography in the past 12 months, with 9.2% of the entire sample reporting viewing pornography at least once in the last month. No data was collected on female students. A nationwide study of paid porn subscriptions showed that the predominantly LDS state of Utah had the highest subscription rate of any state. Utah's LDS then governor Gary Herbert officially declared pornography to be a public health crisis in Utah in 2016. In 2017 the church school BYU released a study using data gathered online from nearly 700 unmarried English-speaking adults on the effects of religiosity on perceptions of porn addictiveness and relationship anxiety. The results showed that seeing oneself as addicted to pornography generated far more anxiety- and shame-related negative outcomes individually and in romantic relationships than any potential negative effects of consuming sexually explicit material. Additionally, individuals reporting higher religiosity were more likely to consider themselves addicted to porn regardless of their comparative usage rate.

== Dancing ==
Currently and in the past LDS Church leaders have looked down on dancing that includes full-body contact, is suggestive of sexual behavior, or has same-sex romantic overtones. A 1972 youth guide stated that unapproved dance movements that were deemed vulgar included shoulder- or hip-shaking, body jerking, crouching, slumping over, and backbending.

== Birth control ==
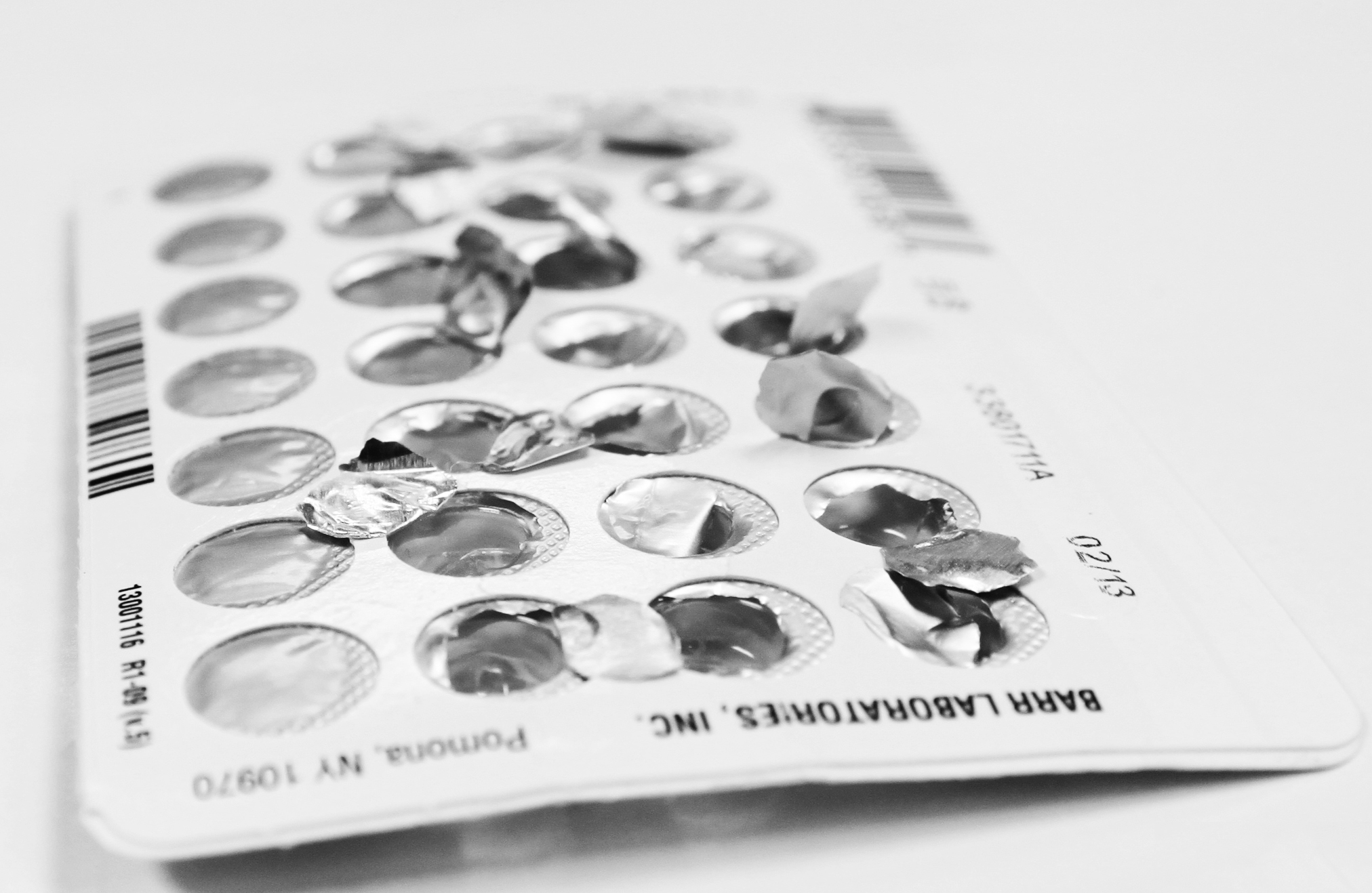
A package of birth control pills.

Teachings on birth control have changed over the course of the church's history going from condemning it as sinful to allowing it. The current church stance as of 2023 is that "decisions about birth control and the consequences of those decisions rest solely with each married couple" and that they should consider "the physical and mental health of the mother and father and their capacity to provide the basic necessities of life for their children" when planning a family. The church discourages surgical sterilization, like vasectomies and tubal ligation. In the past the use of birth control methods including artificial contraception was explicitly condemned as pernicious and sinful. As recently as 2003 a church manual was published containing a quote from the late church president Spencer W. Kimball stating that the church does not "condone nor approve of" measures of contraception which greatly "limit the family".

== Abortion ==
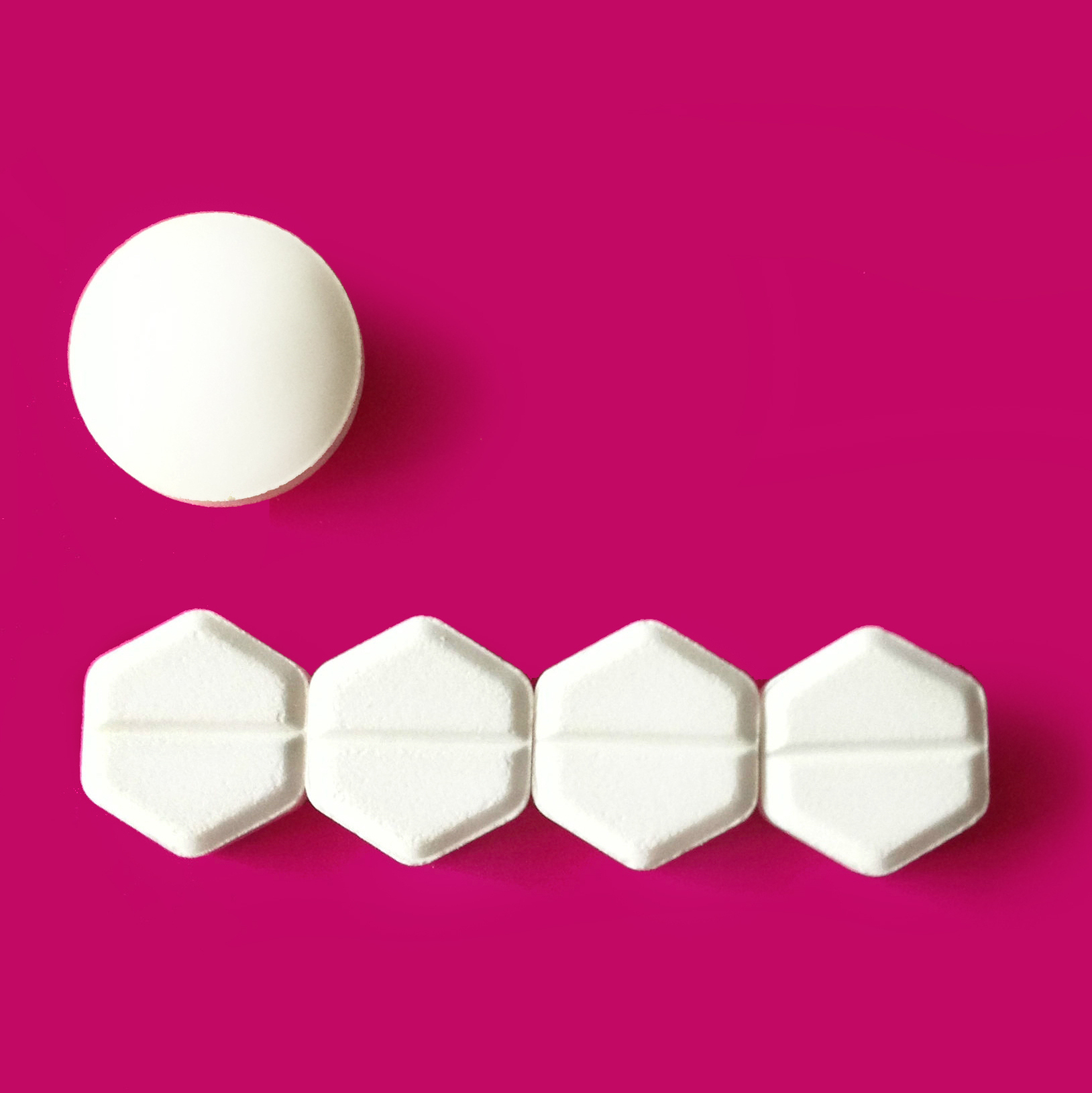
Shown here is the typical pharmaceutical abortifacient regimen for early medical abortions.

The LDS Church opposes elective abortion "for personal or social convenience", but states that abortion could be an acceptable option in cases of rape, incest, danger to the health or life of the mother, or where the fetus has been diagnosed with "severe defects that will not allow the baby to survive beyond birth." In a 2011 US-wide Pew poll, of the 600 LDS-identifying respondents, 27% said abortion should be legal in all or most cases, and 70% said it should be illegal in all or most cases.

== Marriage ==
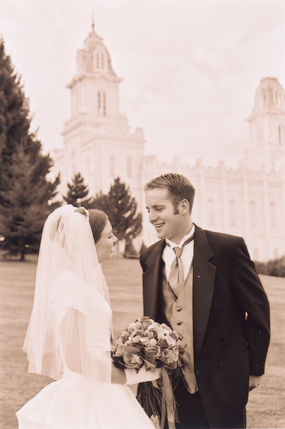
A couple following their marriage sealing ceremony in the Manti Utah Temple

From the 1830s, heterosexual marriage has been a central and distinctive component of the Latter Day Saint theology. LDS teachings on marriage begins with the belief that, if performed by a person who has the requisite priesthood authority, a marriage may continue in the afterlife. Such a marriage is called a celestial marriage or a temple marriage, and is a particular instance of a sealing which binds people together in the afterlife. Celestial marriage is considered to be a requirement for entry into the highest degree of the celestial kingdom (the highest degree of heaven in LDS theology), and is thought to allow the participants to continue to have spirit children in the afterlife and become gods. According to LDS belief, the continuance of a celestial marriage in the afterlife is contingent upon the couple remaining righteous.

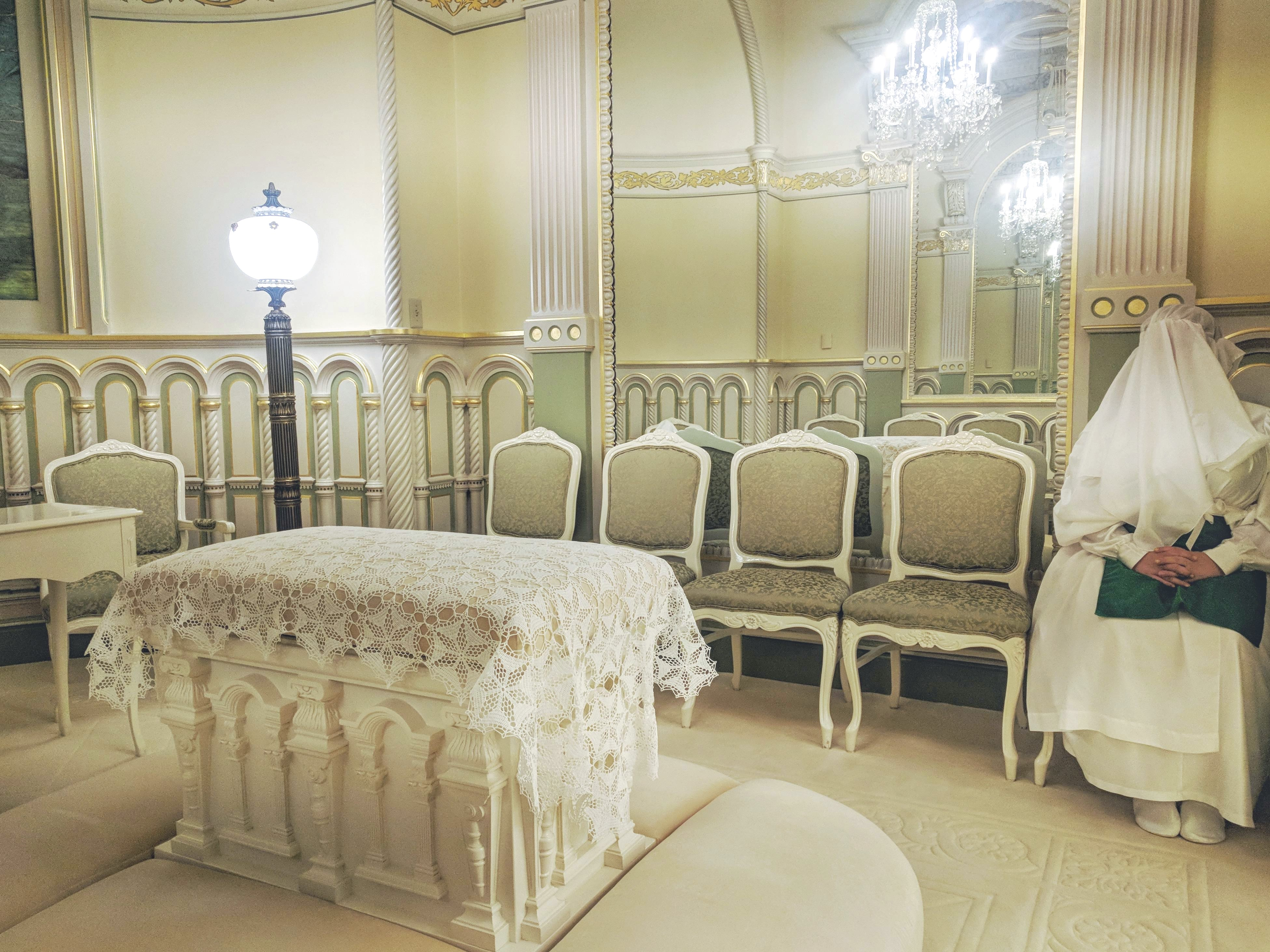
A woman in ceremonial temple clothing used during the LDS sealing sits next to the sealing room altar over which the wedding ceremony is performed. The infinite reflection of the double mirrors is seen in the background.

=== Polygamy ===
From 1852 until 1890, the LDS Church openly authorized polygamous marriages (an LDS term for polygamy) between one man and multiple wives, though polygamous families continued cohabitating into the 1950s. The LDS Church now embraces monogamy and the nuclear family. Members who are found entering into or solemnizing polygamous marriages or associating with polygamous groups are now subject to church discipline and possible excommunication. The topic of same-sex marriage has been one of the church's foremost public concerns since 1993.

=== Restrictions on marriage ===
As of 2024, the church teaches that God does not approve of same-sex marriage. The church played an important role in defeating same-sex marriage legalization in six US states in the late 1990s and early 2000s. Nearly every decade for over a century—beginning with the church's formation in the 1830s until the 1970s—saw some denunciations of interracial marriages (miscegenation), with most statements focusing on Black–White marriages. Until 2013 at least one official church manual in use continued discouraging interracial marriages. In 2013, the church disavowed its previous teachings on interracial marriage for the first time.

== Homosexuality ==
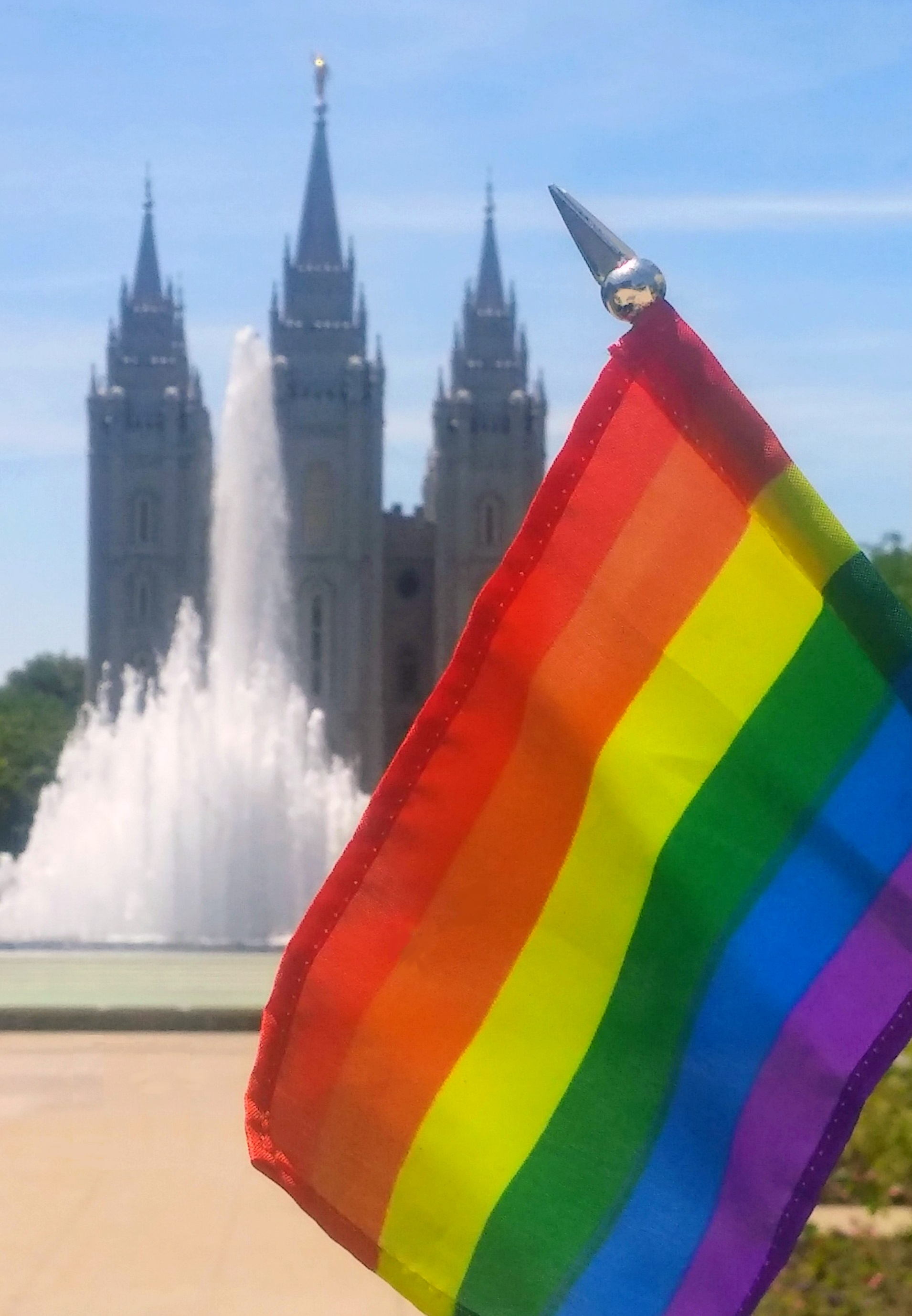
A gay pride flag in front of the SLC temple.

As of 2019, the church states that individuals do not choose their sexual orientation, it now opposes conversion therapy, its church-run therapy services no longer provides such sexual orientation change efforts for gay members, and it has no official stance on the causes of homosexuality. All homosexual sexual activity is condemned as sinful by the Church of Jesus Christ of Latter-day Saints (LDS Church) in its law of chastity, and the church teaches that God does not approve of same-sex marriage. Adherents who participate in same-sex sexual behavior may face church discipline. Members of the church who experience homosexual attractions, including those who self-identify as gay, lesbian, or bisexual remain in good standing in the church if they abstain from same-sex marriage and any homosexual sexual activity or sexual relationships outside an opposite-sex marriage. However, all people, including those in same-sex relationships and marriages, are permitted to attend the weekly Sunday meetings.

In order to receive church ordinances such as baptism, and to enter church temples, non-heterosexual adherents are required to live a celibate lifestyle without any sexual expression. Additionally, in the church's plan of salvation non-celibate gay and lesbian individuals will not be allowed in the top tier of heaven to receive exaltation unless they repent, and a heterosexual marriage is a requirement for exaltation. The church's policies and treatment of LGBT people has long been a source of controversy both within and outside the church. They have also been a significant cause of disagreement and disaffection by members.

=== Past teachings ===
Church leaders previously taught that homosexuality was a curable condition. They counseled members that they could and should change their attractions, and provided therapy and programs with that goal. Even celibate gay people were subject to excommunication.

== Gender ==
Gender identity and roles play an important part in LDS theology which teaches a strict binary of spiritual gender as literal offspring of Heavenly Parents. Part of Sunday Church meetings are currently divided by biological sex, and for most of the 1800s church presidents Joseph Smith and Brigham Young had men, women, and children sit separately for all Sunday meetings.

=== Women ===
The LDS Church is supportive of traditional gender roles. Women have a certain degree of authority in some areas, including leadership positions with authority over children and other women, although these women leaders receive supervision and guidance by male priesthood-holding leaders. Women are "endowed" with priesthood power, but are not ordained to priesthood office. Though not considered clergy, women play a significant part in the operation of local congregations.

=== Gender minorities ===
The transgender flag

Transgender people and other gender minorities currently face membership restrictions in access to priesthood and temple rites. Only recently have leaders begun directly addressing gender diversity and the experiences of transgender, non-binary, intersex, and other gender minorities whose gender identity and expression differ from the cisgender (i.e. non-transgender) majority.

== See also ==
- Christian views on contraception: The Church of Jesus Christ of Latter-day Saints
- Christianity and abortion: The Church of Jesus Christ of Latter-day Saints
