= God Loveth His Children =

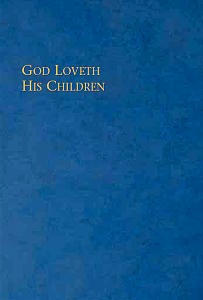
Pamphlet cover.

"God Loveth His Children" was a pamphlet produced by the Church of Jesus Christ of Latter-day Saints (LDS Church) for members with same-sex attraction. It was approved in April 2007 and was announced in July 2007 through a letter to LDS Church bishops and stake presidents, and is available in 27 languages. It represents an official statement from the church, and follows an unofficial interview with apostle Dallin H. Oaks and general authority Lance B. Wickman in April of that year. The pamphlet is not new revelation or doctrinal change, but a continuation of the direction the church has been going in the past several years. However, church leaders say chances are slim it would deviate from its sanctions against active gay relationships.

== Doctrine ==
The title comes from a conversation between the Book of Mormon prophet Nephi and the Holy Ghost. In it, the Holy Ghost asks Nephi if he understands the condescension of God. Nephi replies, "I know that he loveth his children; nevertheless, I do not know the meaning of all things." The pamphlet makes the analogy, that like Nephi, people with same-sex attractions should know that God loves them, but some questions about same-sex attraction "must await a future answer."

The pamphlet acknowledges the reality of same-sex attractions and makes clear that they are not sinful. However, it makes clear that any sexual relationship outside of a heterosexual marriage is sinful, and adds that "the desire for physical gratification does not authorize immorality by anyone." It emphasizes the importance of a heterosexual marriage, and that although many members have "overcome same-sex attraction in mortality, others may not be free of this challenge in this life." Instead, our "desires will be perfected in the next life so that every one of God's children may find joy in a family consisting of a husband, wife, and children."

The pamphlet does not state a cause for homosexuality. It does caution against placing blame on oneself, one's parents, or early experimentation. It teaches against pornography, co-dependent relationships, obsession with same-sex thoughts and feelings, flaunting homosexual tendencies and having friends who publicly display their homosexual feelings. Instead, it advises members with same-sex attraction to seek help from their leaders and other church members, develop self-mastery, fill their lives with goodness, nourish their spirits, and "go forward as do all other members of the church." It emphasizes that many Latter-day Saints with same-sex attraction move "forward with their lives by carefully adhering to gospel standards" and "they can be assured that all the blessings of eternal life will ultimately be theirs."

However, regardless of how people live their lives, members should remember that "no one is, or ever could be, excluded from the circle of God's love." It quotes Gordon B. Hinckley by saying: "Our hearts reach out to those who struggle with feelings of affinity for the same gender. We remember you before the Lord, we sympathize with you, we regard you as our brothers and sisters." It acknowledges that members of the church have not always shown love, and reprimands them, saying "No member of the church should ever be intolerant." It counsels that, "As you show love and kindness to others, you give them an opportunity to change their attitudes and follow Christ more fully."

== Criticism ==
According to Family Fellowship director Gary Watts the pamphlet, "is an improvement on the last three [pamphlets on homosexuality], but doesn't go far enough in embracing those with same-sex attractions." He further criticizes it stating it, "implies that those who are able to change their orientation do so through faith and self-mastery, and are therefore superior to those who don't", and that "[LDS leaders] are setting up an impossible situation for gays—either be celibate or change."

== See also ==
- Affirmation: Gay & Lesbian Mormons
- Evergreen International
- Homosexuality and The Church of Jesus Christ of Latter-day Saints
