= The Miracle of Forgiveness =

Book by Spencer W. Kimball

- Author: Spencer W. Kimball
- Language: English
- Subject: LDS doctrinal teachings about the atonement, repentance, and the plan of salvation.
- Publisher: Bookcraft
- Publication date: 1969
- Publication place: United States
- Media type: Print (Hardcover)
- Pages: 376 pp
- ISBN: 0-88494-444-1
- OCLC: 20950

The Miracle of Forgiveness is a book written by Spencer W. Kimball while he was a member of Quorum of the Twelve Apostles of the Church of Jesus Christ of Latter-day Saints (LDS Church). He later became the church's president.

== Content ==
Originally published in 1969, the book discusses the issues of repentance and forgiveness through Jesus Christ in LDS theology. It is primarily written for an LDS audience. It is notable for exposing sins, including:

Murder, adultery, theft, cursing, unholiness in masters, disobedience in servants, unfaithfulness, improvidence, hatred of God, disobedience to husbands, lack of natural affection, high-mindedness, flattery, lustfulness, infidelity, indiscretion, backbiting, whispering, lack of truth, striking, brawling, quarrelsomeness, unthankfulness, inhospitality, deceitfulness, irreverence, boasting, arrogance, pride, double-tongued talk, profanity, slander, corruptness, thievery, embezzlement, despoiling, covenant-breaking, incontinence, filthiness, ignobleness, filthy communications, impurity, foolishness, slothfulness, impatience, lack of understanding, unmercifulness, idolatry, blasphemy, denial of the Holy Ghost, Sabbath breaking, envy, jealousy, malice, maligning, vengefulness, implacability, bitterness, clamor, spite, defiling, reviling, evil speaking, provoking, greediness for filthy lucre, disobedience to parents, anger, hate, covetousness, bearing false witness, inventing evil things, fleshliness, heresy, presumptuousness, abomination, insatiable appetite, instability, ignorance, self-will, speaking evil of dignitaries, becoming a stumbling block; and in our modern language, masturbation, petting, fornication, adultery, homosexuality; and every sex perversion, every hidden and secret sin and all unholy and impure practices.

Kimball defines repentance as the perfect, successful abandonment of sin, through the following actions:

1. conviction, in which "the sinner consciously recognizes his sin."
2. abandonment of sin
3. confession to church authorities and/or other parties wronged by the sin
4. restitution
5. keeping God's commandments
6. forgiving others

"Trying is not sufficient. Nor is repentance complete when one merely tries to abandon sin," Kimball writes. The objective of repentance, he writes, is to obtain "perfection" as a prerequisite for achieving "immortality and eternal life. ... This progress toward eternal life is a matter of achieving perfection. Living all the commandments guarantees total forgiveness of sins and assures one of exaltation through that perfection which comes by complying with the formula the Lord gave us. ... Being perfect means to triumph over sin."

It is impossible for me or any other mortal to save another's soul, but it is my humble hope that through this book some who are suffering the baleful effects of sin may be helped to find the way from darkness to light, from suffering to peace, from misery to hope, and from spiritual death to eternal life. If to any degree the book achieves this and helps to confirm others in a life of righteous endeavor, my efforts in its production will have been justified.

== Reputation in the LDS Church ==
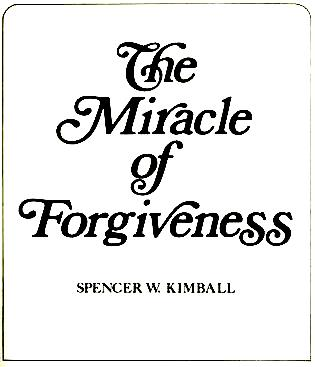
The title page of soon-to-be church president Kimball's controversial 1969 book.

According to Kimball's son, Edward, "[T]he book filled a need, as evidenced by the printing of half a million copies in English and sixteen other languages between its publication in 1969 and his death in 1985 .... By 1998 the total in all languages was roughly estimated at 1.6 million copies."

This book has received numerous accolades from LDS Church authorities. Ezra Taft Benson, who succeeded Kimball as church president, urged all church members "to read and reread President Spencer W. Kimball's book." More recently, in the November 2004 General Conference, LDS Church apostle Richard G. Scott called it a "masterly work" and, prior to that, "a superb guide to forgiveness through repentance." Scott recommended reading the last two chapters first, to better appreciate the book's message.

Although from 1976 to 1988 the LDS Church encouraged missionaries to read the book, since then it has not been part of the "approved missionary library". The book went out of print in 2015.

The book is controversial among LDS Church members for its treatment of masturbation, homosexuality, premarital sex, and rape. Rape survivors have been published criticizing parts of the book including the phrase "It is better to die in defending one's [virginity] than to live having lost it without a struggle" as victim blaming and shaming rhetoric that contributes to rape culture. Allen Bergin, a retired psychologist from Brigham Young University and past president of the Association of Mormon Counselors and Psychotherapists (AMCAP), felt the useful parts were "overshadowed by a host of negatives and also outdated policies that the church itself doesn't even endorse any more." Years after publication, Kimball reportedly remarked that its tone may have been too strong.

== See also ==
- Beliefs and practices of The Church of Jesus Christ of Latter-day Saints
- Law of chastity
- Sexuality and Mormonism
- Homosexuality and The Church of Jesus Christ of Latter-day Saints
- Masturbation and The Church of Jesus Christ of Latter-day Saints
