= Lance B. Wickman =

American religious leader

Lance Bradley Wickman

Emeritus General Authority
- October 2, 2010

First Quorum of the Seventy
- April 1, 2000 – October 2, 2010
- End reason: Granted general authority emeritus status

Second Quorum of the Seventy
- April 2, 1994 – April 1, 2000
- End reason: Transferred to First Quorum of the Seventy

Personal details
- Born: Lance B. Wickman; November 11, 1940 (age 85); Seattle, Washington, United States
- Alma mater: University of California, Berkeley (B.S.); Stanford University (J.D.)
- Awards: Bronze Star; Purple Heart; Valorous Unit Award; Combat Infantryman Badge; Silver Beaver; Silver Buffalo

Lance Bradley Wickman (born November 11, 1940) is an American lawyer and former religious leader who served as general counsel of the Church of Jesus Christ of Latter-day Saints (LDS Church) from January 1996 until October 2023. Wickman has been an LDS Church general authority since 1994 and was given emeritus status in 2010.

== Early life and education ==
Wickman was born in Seattle, Washington to Alton C. Wickman and Irene Carlson. He was raised in New Jersey and Glendale, California. Wickman graduated from the University of California, Berkeley, in 1964 with a bachelor's degree in political science. In 1966, Wickman, a U.S. Army Ranger, was sent to fight in South Vietnam as a platoon leader in the United States Army and on a second tour of duty as a military advisor to the Army of the Republic of Vietnam. During the war he was awarded the Bronze Star, the Purple Heart, the Valorous Unit Award and the Combat Infantryman Badge.

After his return from South Vietnam, Wickman graduated from Stanford Law School in 1972. In 1986, Wickman was elected to the board of directors of Rancho Bernardo Savings Bank. Wickman has been awarded the Silver Beaver and Silver Buffalo by the Boy Scouts of America.

== Legal career ==
After law school, Wickman entered private practice at the law firm Latham & Watkins. He was a founding partner of the firm's San Diego Office. He was involved in business, real estate, and construction law, and argued cases before both the Supreme Court of California and the US Court of Appeals for the Ninth Circuit. He retired from the firm at the end of 1995.

== LDS Church service ==
From 1961 to 1963, Wickman was a LDS missionary in the church's Central British Mission. Prior to his call as a general authority, Wickman was a bishop, stake president, and regional representative in the LDS Church. He became a member of the Second Quorum of the Seventy in 1994. In the late 1990s, Wickman worked with Dallin H. Oaks on an article, aimed at an international audience of government figures, on the functioning of the church's missionary program and why its operation is central to religious freedom for church members.

In 2000, Wickman was transferred to the First Quorum of the Seventy. In 2006, Wickman was part of an interview with Oaks regarding homosexuality and the LDS Church. In June 2008, Wickman issued a plea to the media to make clear the distinction between the LDS Church and the Fundamentalist Church of Jesus Christ of Latter-Day Saints.

On October 2, 2010, at the LDS Church's semi-annual General Conference, Wickman was released from the First Quorum of the Seventy and designated an emeritus general authority. In 2013, Wickman spoke on behalf of the LDS Church at the National Religious Freedom Conference in Washington, D.C.

Wickman served as the general counsel of the LDS Church from 1996 until 2023, when he was replaced by Alexander Dushku. He has spoken extensively on religious freedom issues.

== Personal life ==
Wickman married Patricia Farr in 1963 in the Los Angeles California Temple.

== See also ==
- Julie A. Dockstader, "'But as for me and my house, we will serve the Lord,'" Church News, 1994-05-28
- "Elder Lance B. Wickman Of the Seventy," Ensign, May 1994, p. 109
- 2008 Deseret News Church Almanac (Salt Lake City, Utah: Deseret Morning News, 2007)
