= Mormon Doctrine (book) =

1958 book by Bruce R. McConkie

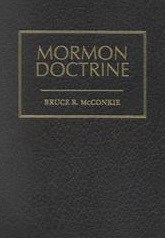
- Cover for the 1966 2nd edition of Mormon Doctrine
- Author: Bruce R. McConkie
- Publication date: 1958

Mormon Doctrine (originally subtitled A Compendium of the Gospel) is a 1958 book written by Bruce R. McConkie, a general authority of the Church of Jesus Christ of Latter-day Saints (LDS Church) and intended as an encyclopedic collection of the church's core concepts and beliefs.

The book was intended primarily for a Latter-day Saint audience and has been used as a reference book by church members because of its comprehensive nature, and was a highly influential bestseller in the LDS community. It was viewed by some members, then and now, as representing official doctrine despite the book never being endorsed by the church, and some church leaders objected to the tone and claims within the book.

Mormon Doctrine earned a mixed reception, being heavily criticized by some church leaders and members and well regarded by others. After the book's first edition was removed from publication at the instruction of the church's First Presidency and Quorum of the Twelve, corrections were made in subsequent editions. After three editions, Mormon Doctrine has been out of print since 2010.

== History ==
In 1958, McConkie, then a member of the First Council of the Seventy of the LDS Church, published a book entitled Mormon Doctrine: A Compendium of the Gospel, which he described as "the first major attempt to digest, explain, and analyze all of the important doctrines of the kingdom" and "the first extensive compendium of the whole gospel—the first attempt to publish an encyclopedic commentary covering the whole field of revealed religion." He included a disclaimer that he alone was responsible for the doctrinal and scriptural interpretations, a practice then unusual.

In writing the book, McConkie relied heavily upon the LDS Church's scriptures and recognized doctrinal authorities, including Joseph Smith, Brigham Young, Orson Pratt, John Taylor, and Joseph Fielding Smith.

== Scrutiny by church leaders ==
Church leaders were surprised by its publication since he had not asked permission and was not asked to develop such a work. They responded that while McConkie attempted to fulfill the need for a concise reference work on church topics, they took issue with the harsh tone and some of McConkie's statements and conclusions. Apostle Mark E. Petersen said it was "full of errors and misstatements, and it is most unfortunate that it has received such wide circulation."

On January 5, 1959, apostle Marion G. Romney was assigned by church president David O. McKay to read and report on the book. His report was delivered on January 28, which mainly "dealt with Elder McConkie's usage of forceful, blunt language; some strongly worded statements about ambiguous doctrine and matters of opinion; and the overall authoritative tone throughout the book, though in general Romney had a high regard for Mormon Doctrine and felt it filled an evident need remarkably well." The report concluded that "notwithstanding its many commendable and valuable features and the author's assumption of 'sole and full responsibility' for it, its nature and scope and the authoritative tone of the style in which it is written pose the question as to the propriety of the author's attempting such a project without assignment and supervision from him whose right and responsibility it is to speak for the church on Mormon Doctrine."

Petersen "gave McKay an oral report in which he recommended 1,067 corrections" to the book.

== Publication restriction ==
Nearly a year later, after meeting to discuss the book, the January 8, 1960 office notes of McKay reflect:

"We [the First Presidency of the church] decided that Bruce R. McConkie’s book, Mormon Doctrine recently published by Bookcraft Company, must not be re-published, as it is full of errors and misstatements, and it is most unfortunate that it has received such wide circulation. It is reported to us that Brother McConkie has made corrections to his book, and is now preparing another edition. We decided this morning that we do not want him to publish another edition."

McKay called Joseph Fielding Smith (McConkie's father-in-law) on January 27, 1960, to inform him of the decision to ban further publication of the book:

[McKay] then said: 'Now, Brother Smith, he is a General Authority, and we do not want to give him a public rebuke that would be embarrassing to him and lessen his influence with the members of the Church, so we shall speak to the Twelve at our meeting in the temple tomorrow, and tell them that Brother McConkie's book is not approved as an authoritative book, and that it should not be republished, even if the errors... are corrected.' Brother Smith agreed with this suggestion to report to the Twelve, and said, 'That is the best thing to do.'

When the First Presidency met with McConkie about their decision, he responded, "I am amenable to whatever you Brethren want. I will do exactly what you want. I will be as discreet and as wise as I can."

== Second edition ==
In his biography of his father, Joseph Fielding McConkie states:

"On July 5, 1966, President McKay invited Elder McConkie into his office and gave approval for the book to be reprinted if appropriate changes were made and approved. Elder Spencer W. Kimball [of the Quorum of the Twelve Apostles] was assigned to be Elder McConkie's mentor in making those changes .... My father told me that President McKay had so directed him. In addition to that, I am in possession of handwritten papers by my father affirming that direction."

Other accounts of the meeting suggest that McConkie sought out permission and generously interpreted McKay's counsel:

McConkie audaciously approached McKay six years later and pushed for publication of the book in a revised form .… McKay, age ninety-two and in failing health, did not take the matter up with his counselors or the Quorum of the Twelve. Rather, he said that 'should the book be re-published at this time,' McConkie would be responsible for it and 'that it will not be a Church publication.'

Three days after meeting with McKay, McConkie wrote in a memo to Clare Middlemiss, McKay's secretary, "President McKay indicated that the book should be republished at this time."

Another account was given in an audio interview of Oscar W. McConkie Jr. on June 26, 2017:

When I determined to retire from Kirton and McConkie, I was in my 85th year. I went to the First Presidency meeting to advise the First Presidency. As always, President Monson was kind to me and praised my lawyering. This was at a time when a book had been published about President David O. McKay in which it was falsely stated that Bruce had republished his book Mormon Doctrine without President McKay’s consent. President Monson went out of his way to say, so that it would be in the recorded minutes of the First Presidency, "Bruce and I got President McKay’s permission to republish Bruce's Mormon Doctrine."

=== Changes between the first and second editions ===
The second edition of Mormon Doctrine, with its approved revisions, was published in 1966. Horne states, "The most obvious difference between the two editions is a more moderate tone." Many entries were removed, while others were added, and entire paragraphs were changed in other entries. Complete removals included entire entries which specifically labeled the Roman Catholic church as the Church of the Devil and the great and abominable church, including the sections titled "Catholicism" and "Roman Catholicism". Other removed sections were critical of aspects unique to Catholicism including the sections "Indulgences", "Supererogation", and "Transubstantiation".

Other notable changes in the second edition also include the removal of sentences stating:

- "Suicide is murder, pure and simple, and murderers are damned",
- "No doubt psychiatry ... has some benefit ... but in many instances, it is in effect a form of apostate religion which keeps sinners from repenting....", and
- that all those using condoms or other artificial contraception are "in rebellion against God and are guilty of gross wickedness."

Additionally removed were references to evolution, including:

- one stating that the "official doctrine of the Church" asserted a "falsity of the theory of organic evolution", along with sentences stating
- that "There were no pre-Adamites",
- that Adam was not the "end-product of evolution", and
- that there "was no death in the world, either for man or for any form of life until after the Fall of Adam."

In later printings of the second edition, changes were made to statements regarding Black people in the pre-mortal life. The 1969 printing retained the controversial statements, but printings of the second edition by 1978 reflected the new church policy.

== Third edition ==
A third edition of the book was published in 1978 after church president Spencer W. Kimball said he received a revelation that the priesthood should be extended to all worthy male members. The changes were also included in the last printings of the second edition.

In the 1966 edition of Mormon Doctrine, McConkie wrote that those who were sent to Earth through the lineage of Cain (i.e., Black Africans) were those who had been less valiant in the premortal life. He also said that because Ham married Egyptus and because she was a descendant of Cain, that he was able to preserve the "negro lineage." The denial of the priesthood to certain men was then mentioned and he explained that in this life, Black people would not hold the priesthood, but that those blessings would be available to them in the next life. (Note: Bruce R. McConkie said, "Of the two-thirds who followed Christ, however, some were more valiant than others ....Those who were less valiant in pre-existence and who thereby had certain spiritual restrictions imposed upon them during mortality are known to us as the negroes. Such spirits are sent to earth through the lineage of Cain, the mark put upon him for his rebellion against God and his murder of Abel being a black skin (Moses 5:16–41; 12:22). Noah's son Ham married Egyptus, a descendant of Cain, thus preserving the negro lineage through the flood (Abraham 1:20–27). Negroes in this life are denied the priesthood; under no circumstances can they hold this delegation of authority from the Almighty. (Abra. 1:20–27.) The gospel message of salvation is not carried affirmatively to them (Moses 7:8, 12, 22), although sometimes negroes search out the truth, join the Church, and become by righteous living heirs of the celestial kingdom of heaven. President Brigham Young and others have taught that in the future eternity worthy and qualified negroes will receive the priesthood and every gospel blessing available to any man. The present status of the negro rests purely and simply on the foundation of pre-existence. Along with all races and peoples he is receiving here what he merits as a result of the long pre-mortal probation in the presence of the Lord....The negroes are not equal with other races where the receipt of certain spiritual blessings are concerned, particularly the priesthood and the temple blessings that flow therefrom, but this inequality is not of man's origin. It is the Lord's doing.") In 1881, church president John Taylor expounded on the belief that the curse placed on Ham (who was of the lineage of Cain), was continued because Ham's wife was also of that "seed." (Note: John Taylor said, "And after the flood we are told that the curse that had been pronounced upon Cain was continued through Ham's wife, as he had married a wife of that seed. And why did it pass through the flood? Because it was necessary that the devil should have a representation upon the earth as well as God; and that man should be a free agent to act for himself, and that all men might have the opportunity of receiving or rejecting the truth, and be governed by it or not according to their wishes and abide the result; and that those who would be able to maintain correct principles under all circumstances, might be able to associate with the Gods in the eternal worlds.") In 1978, McConkie said the curse of Cain was no longer in effect. McConkie's theology concerning people of African descent and the Mormon priesthood was removed from the third edition.

== Legacy ==
While the Bible Dictionary included with the LDS Church's publication of the Bible in 1979 is based upon the Cambridge University Press bible dictionary, modifications were made to many entries to better reflect Mormon beliefs, and McConkie's ideas as found in Mormon Doctrine heavily influenced those changes. For example, the entry for "Abraham, covenant of" in the Bible Dictionary is exactly the same as the entry for "Abrahamic covenant" in Mormon Doctrine except for one paragraph. Many other Bible Dictionary entries teach identical concepts with closely paralleled wording as corresponding entries in Mormon Doctrine.

In 1972, McConkie was called to serve in the Quorum of Twelve Apostles by church president Harold B. Lee.

== End of printing ==
Deseret Book opted in 2010 to cease printing Mormon Doctrine, saying sales were low. Despite Deseret Book's citing declining sales, a story published the same week on KUTV stated that local Salt Lake City booksellers reported consistently strong sales of the book.

== See also ==
- Black people and Mormonism
- Mormon folklore
- Mormonism and evolution
