= Delta Phi Kappa =

Delta Phi Kappa may refer to:

- Delta Phi Kappa, a sorority at University of Southern California
- Delta Phi Kappa (LDS Church), a former fraternity for returned missionaries of The Church of Jesus Christ of Latter-day Saints (LDS Church)

== See also ==
- Sigma Gamma Chi, an LDS Church fraternity founded in 1936.
