= Lambda Delta Sigma =

Lambda Delta Sigma may refer to:

- Lambda Delta Sigma (Concordia), a sorority at Concordia College
- Lambda Delta Sigma (LDS Church), a sorority for members of The Church of Jesus Christ of Latter-day Saints (LDS Church)

== See also ==
- Sigma Gamma Chi, an LDS Church fraternity founded in 1936 as Lambda Delta Sigma that spun off the LDS sorority of the same name
