= Delta Phi Kappa (LDS Church) =

American college fraternity (1920–1978)

- ΔΦΚ
- Delta Phi Kappa pledge pin, circa 1961
- Founded: 1920; 106 years ago University of Utah
- Type: Religious
- Affiliation: Independent
- Status: Merged
- Merge date: 1978
- Successor: Sigma Gamma Chi
- Emphasis: Latter-day Saints
- Scope: National (US)
- Chapters: 8
- Members: 10,000+ lifetime
- Headquarters: United States

Delta Phi Kappa (ΔΦΚ) (previously The Friars Club and Delta Phi), was a fraternity for male returned missionaries of the Church of Jesus Christ of Latter-day Saints (LDS Church) at colleges in Utah, Idaho, and Arizona. It existed from 1920 to 1978.

== History ==
=== Delta Phi Society ===
Delta Phi Kappa traces its origins to a predecessor organization, the Delta Phi Literary and Debating Society, which was established in 1869 at the University of Deseret (now University of Utah) as a society for seniors. The society was formed at the suggestion of the university's new president, John R. Park, who wanted to "groom student speakers and debaters." Although its charter members are unknown, Harry Culmer, Aaron Cummings, Theodore W. Curtis, W. C. Dunton Jr., John G. Felt, Lord Gilberson, C. P. Huey, Alonzo Hyde, Albert Kimball, S. H. Leaver, P. Margetts Jr., Arthur Pratt, Rolla Roberts, E. G. Taylor, Orson F. Whitney, and Alfales Young are listed as members in the society's minute books from 1872 to 1874.

Delta Phi Society was housed on campus in the Old Council House. Its members debated each other and members of Zeta Gamma after it formed in 1872. The society also created its library as the university's library was inferior. Member purchased shares in the library for $5. There was also a chess club associated with the library, along with a spittoon. Around March 1873, the society held an entertainment fundraiser for the library that was scandalous to the locals. In early 1873, seven women became honorary members of the society.

The society moved off-campus in the fall of 1873 and met at Boston High School. The group considered changing its mission to debating scientific topics rather than politics and philosophy, but did not approve a new constitution that would have formalized the change. However, these conversations impacted recruitment, and membership lagged by January 1874 when the group reduced its initiation fees from $5 to $2.50. Alice Overton, Adie Snow, and Caroline Young were initiated as the first female regular active members in February 1874, with Snow becoming the group's secretary.

When the university moved to Old Union Square, the society met on campus in Room A from 1884 to the late 1890s. The group was flourishing in 1885, with more applicants than spots for membership. In addition to debates, the society of this era brought in guest speakers, hosted musical performances, and held balls or dances. However, the university moved to a new location in October 1899, and the society faltered. In January 1900, the university's president Ernest Bramwell aspired to form an intercollegiate debating society. By February 26, 1901, the society "indefinitely adjourned" because 31 of its members voted to affiliate with a national social fraternity. This merger did not happen, and by the fall of 1902, 25 men re-established the Delta Phi Society. However, the society went dormant in 1904.

=== Friars Club ===
Former LDS Church missionaries turned students at the University of Utah, Stephen G. Covey and Elmer Jenkins wanted to create a social group for returned LDS Church missionaries. They described their idea to the university president John A. Widtsoe. Widtsoe counseled Covey and Jenkins on creating the group which had to open its membership to former missionaries of all faiths to obtain approval from the Board of Regents.

The Friars Club was formed on November 24, 1920. Its goal was to help its members keep "the high and worthy ideals of manhood which became a servant of the Master." Membership was open to those who had served at least a six-month mission for any Christian denomination or were attending a school of divinity and had done enough religious service to be equivalent to a six-month mission.

Its three founding members were Covey, Scott Partridge, and Donald Daynes. Because of Widtsoe's contributions to the establishment of the Friar's Club, he was known as its foster father. Covey was elected as the club's first president. Elva Chipman and Sadye Eccles were the only women to join the fraternity; membership was restricted to men after the first year due to the lack of returned female missionaries.

In 1922, in response to the Friars Club, some students and faculty members created the Fryers Club, a group of "avowed atheists" in an attempt to prevent the influence of the Friars Club on campus. The university's Board of Regents required the Fryers Club to submit meeting notes to be inspected due to complaints from Friars Club members. The Fryers Club did not comply with the requests of the Board and was dissolved.

The average membership of the Friars Club during the 1920s was over fifty members. In 1927, chapters of the Friars Club were added at Weber State College (W chapter) and the Utah Agricultural College (A chapter), with Lewellyn McKay named as the first interchapter president. Widtsoe, David O. McKay, Thomas E. McKay, Adam S. Bennion, and Richard R. Lyman were among patrons given honorary membership in the Friars Club.

The Friars Club tried to convince members of the Young Doctors of Divinity (YDD) Club at Brigham Young University (BYU) to join the Friars Club. After much correspondence, the clubs were merged on the condition that the women in the YDD be permitted to exist as an auxiliary group of the Friars Club, called the YDDers. The Y chapter of the Friars Club was established at BYU in 1929. In 1930, two alumni chapters were added in Los Angeles and Salt Lake City.

=== Name change and consolidation ===
LDS Church leaders lobbied the Friars Club for a name change and also objected to some of the group's fraternity-like activities, such as blackballing nominees. Bennion and Alton Melville, the Friars Club president, discussed their concerns about the purpose of the club and its name. In addition, a non-religious group in New York had the same name and would be confused if the Friars Club expanded eastward. Others stated that the group was insulting to Catholics. Melville confessed to another member that he secretly intended the club to be a social fraternity rather than a religious club.

Eventually, the church proposed that the Friars Club adopt the Delta Phi name and reform under the Church Educational System. Delta Phi had recently reformed, and many of its alumni approved this merger. The two groups officially consolidated at a ceremony on April 3, 1931, adopting the name of Delta Phi and its history as the oldest fraternity in Utah. Previous members of the Delta Phi debating society were considered honorary members of the new fraternity.

After the merger, the fraternity began selecting alumni as presidents rather than students. Delta Phi gained members and popularity during the 1930s, but membership in all chapters diminished during World War II except at the University of Utah, whose medical and engineering students were exempted from the United States draft. After the war, membership in the chapters increased significantly. Delta Phi was led by volunteer national officers who brought the fraternity to other campuses and established housing for some members. The fraternity established and ran housing at Utah State University, Ricks College, and the University of Utah.

In 1961, a larger, nationwide fraternity, also named Delta Phi, asked the fraternity to change its name. Its name was changed to Delta Phi Kappa in 1961. Delta Phi Kappa was not sponsored or funded by the LDS Church, although it was encouraged by the church. The purpose of the fraternity was to allow returned missionaries to socially interact with other men with "high standards" and to allow them to gradually adjust to normal dating and social lives after two years of missionary lifestyle.

Over ten thousand men belonged to the fraternity between 1920 and 1978. Chapters provided special sacrament meetings to wards near their campuses as well as presented spiritual programs and talent shows for local prisons and mental hospitals. Other service activities included attending the temple and helping train future church missionaries.

=== Dissociation ===
In 1978, Delta Phi Kappa was absorbed by the LDS Church into Sigma Gamma Chi, which was open to all college-aged men and not restricted to returned missionaries. Sigma Gamma Chi was disbanded in 2011 along with Lambda Delta Sigma, the equivalent for women, when the LDS Church discontinued its sponsorship of fraternities, sororities, and other social clubs at universities.

Delta Phi pin, circa 1950.

== Symbols ==
Members of the Friar's Club won a triangular pin over their hearts; the three sides represented faith, loyalty, and love. The black-enameled pin was decorated with three rubies and featured an image of a monk. The club's symbol was Friar Tuck and its colors were orange and black.

After the merger in 1931, Delta Phi adopted a new crest that included a shield that was decorated with a four-pointed jeweled star, the lamp of learning, a scroll, and the Greek letters ΔΦ. Member pins were a simplified version of the shield, featuring the star and Greek letters on a black background. The fraternity had three pins—a pledge pin, a Greek letter pin, and a membership pin. Only initiates could wear the latter two pins.

When the fraternity's name changed to Delta Phi Kappa in 1961, the Greek letters on its badge were also changed to ΔΦΚ.

== Chapters ==
At its height in the 1950s, Delta Phi Kappa had ten chapters.

Chapter	Chartered/Range	Institution	Location	Housing	Status	Reference
University of Utah	November 24, 1920 – 1978	University of Utah	Salt Lake City, Utah	Yes	Merged (ΣΓΧ)	(Note: This chapter originally formed as the Friars Club and changed its name to Delta Phi in 1931.)
A chapter	1927–1978	Utah Agricultural College	Logan, Utah	Yes	Merged (ΣΓΧ)	
W chapter	1927–1978	Weber State University	Ogden, Utah		Merged (ΣΓΧ)	
Y chapter	January 1929 – 1978	Brigham Young University	Provo, Utah		Merged (ΣΓΧ)	(Note: Chapter formed when the Friars Club absorbed the local Young Doctors of Divinity Club.)
University of Utah Alumni	1930–1978	University of Utah	Salt Lake City, Utah		Merged (ΣΓΧ)	
Los Angeles Alumni	1930–1978		Los Angeles, California		Merged (ΣΓΧ)	
Ricks College	1949–1978	Ricks College	Rexburg, Idaho	Yes	Merged (ΣΓΧ)	
Arizona State University	1951–1978	Arizona State University	Tempe, Arizona	Yes	Merged (ΣΓΧ)	
Southern Utah University	1965–1978	Southern Utah University	Cedar City, Utah		Merged (ΣΓΧ)	
Idaho State University	1966–1978	Idaho State University	Pocatello, Idaho		Merged (ΣΓΧ)	

== National presidents ==
- Howard G. Kelly, 1931–1932
- Milton Bennion, 1932–1934
- Levi E. Young, 1934–1937
- John A. Widtsoe, 1937–1952
- Avard Booth (acting president), 1952–1953
- Matthew Cowley, 1953
- Harold H. Smith, 1954 (acting president)
- Milton R. Hunter, 1954–1960
- Henry D. Taylor, 1960–1965
- Paul H. Dunn, 1965–1968
- Marion D. Hanks, 1968–1976
- Harold Smith, 1976–1978

== Notable members ==
=== Delta Phi Literary and Debating Society ===
- Harden Bennion, Utah State Insurance Commissioner
- J. Reuben Clark. U.S. State Department
- Joseph F. Merrill, dean at the University of Utah
- Stephen L Richards, lawyer
- Heber M. Wells, governor of Utah

=== Delta Phi / Delta Phi Kappa ===
- Milton Bennion, educator and university administrator
- Matthew Cowley, missionary and LDS Church leader
- Paul H. Dunn, general authority of LDS Church
- Marion D. Hanks, lawyer and general authority of LDS Church
- Milton R. Hunter, author, educator, and religious leader
- L. Tom Perry, general authority of LDS Church
- Ronald A. Rasband, general authority of LDS Church
- Henry D. Taylor, general authority of LDS Church
- John A. Widtsoe, scientist, author, and religious leader
- Levi E. Young, general authority of LDS Church
- Mahonri Young, sculptor and artist

== See also ==
- Christian fraternities
- Yesharah Society
