= Lambda Delta Sigma (LDS Church) =

American college sorority (1936–2000)

- ΛΔΣ
- Founded: 1936; 89 years ago University of Utah
- Type: Religious
- Affiliation: Independent
- Status: Merged
- Merge date: 2000
- Successor: LDS Student Association
- Emphasis: Latter-day Saints
- Scope: Local
- Chapters: 1 ?
- Headquarters: United States

Lambda Delta Sigma (ΛΔΣ) was a college sorority, although originally it was co-educational, sponsored by the Church of Jesus Christ of Latter-day Saints (LDS Church). The Greek letters in its name match LDS, the common initialization of Latter-day Saints.

== History ==
In the early years of the Institute of Religion at the University of Utah, attendance was growing and some male students wanted a way to build their brotherhood with fellow Latter-day Saints. Lowell L. Bennion, the institute director, helped them prepare a constitution and organized them as "Alpha House" in October 1936, followed by "Omega House" for women in December. Shortly afterward, these houses were collectively named Lambda Delta Sigma, which would be a co-educational Greek society open to anyone willing to uphold Latter-day Saint ideals.

In 1966 following a study by Paul H. Dunn, the LDSSA was formed and Lambda Delta Sigma was dissolved.

Elaine Cannon, Winnifred Jardine, Frank Bradshaw and Alfred Nielsen were called by the general authorities to make plans for a new LDS sorority and divided the organization, making Lambda Delta Sigma a sorority and creating Sigma Gamma Chi as its fraternity. Elaine Cannon was called as the new national advisor, and wrote the Pledge Ceremony, Initiation Ceremony and selected other symbols for the group.

In November 1967, this new Lambda Delta Sigma was approved at the first National Convention of the LDSSA. In 1977, the sorority was transferred to the leadership of the Relief Society General Presidency and the national LDS President served on the General Relief Society Board and by 1982, all Lambda Delta Sigma officers gained National Board positions.

In June 2000 it was announced that in September, the sorority was to absorbed by the Institute Women's Association, a church organization for all female Young Single Adults.

== See also ==
- Sigma Gamma Chi
- LDS Student Association
