= Elaine A. Cannon =

American Mormon leader (1922–2003)

8th Young Women General President
- 1978 – 1984
- Called by: Spencer W. Kimball
- Predecessor: Ruth H. Funk
- Successor: Ardeth G. Kapp

Personal details
- Born: Elaine W. Anderson; April 9, 1922; Salt Lake City, Utah, United States
- Died: May 19, 2003 (aged 81); Salt Lake City, Utah, United States
- Resting place: Salt Lake City Cemetery; 40.777°N 111.858°W
- Education: Sociology degree
- Alma mater: University of Utah
- Occupation: Writer
- Spouse(s): D. James Cannon
- Children: 6
- Parents: Aldon Joseph Anderson; Minnie Evaline Egan Anderson
- Website: Elaine Anderson Cannon

Elaine Anderson Cannon (April 9, 1922 – May 19, 2003) was the eighth general president of the Young Women organization of the Church of Jesus Christ of Latter-day Saints from 1978 to 1984. Cannon was a writer and an editor and the author of over fifty books.

== Biography ==
Elaine Anderson was born to Aldon Joseph and Minnie Egan Anderson in Salt Lake City, Utah. As a teenager, she started writing a daily column aimed at teenagers for the Deseret News. She studied philosophy, English, history, and speech at the University of Utah. She graduated in 1943 with a degree in sociology. On March 25, 1943, she married D. James Cannon in the Salt Lake Temple.

She also did freelance work, publishing articles in national magazines including Seventeen and Better Homes and Gardens.

Cannon was key figure in organizing the LDS Student Association. While she worked in establishing Lambda Delta Sigma, the church's sorority, W. Rolfe Kerr worked to establish the church's fraternity, Sigma Gamma Chi. Cannon was also a member of the church's Priesthood Correlation Committee.

In 1959, she served as a delegate to the White House Conference on Youth. During this year, she became an associate editor for "Era of Youth," a section of the Improvement Era that was targeted to adolescents. In 1971, the church magazine New Era was launched, which was patterned after the "Era of Youth" section of the Improvement Era.

In 1978, church president Spencer W. Kimball appointed Cannon as the successor to Ruth H. Funk as the general president of the Young Women organization. During her tenure, the young women of the church began holding a yearly meeting in the Salt Lake Tabernacle; the meeting was intended for all adolescent girls of the church and their mothers, and it was broadcast by satellite around the world. Also during her tenure, young women classes began being held on Sundays as part of the church's consolidated worship services. Cannon was released in 1984 and was succeeded by Ardeth G. Kapp.

Cannon died on May 19, 2003, in Salt Lake City.

The Church of Jesus Christ of Latter-day Saints titles
Preceded by Ruth H. Funk	Young Women General President; 1978–1984	Succeeded by Ardeth G. Kapp
