= Donald Cannon =

Donald Cannon may refer to:

- Donald Q. Cannon (born 1936), Mormon history professor at Brigham Young University
- D. James Cannon (1919–1998), member of the Utah House of Representatives
- Don Cannon (born 1979), American record producer and DJ.
- Don Cannon (news anchor) (born 1940), former television news anchor in Pittsburgh, Pennsylvania
