= Single adult =

Single adult may refer to:

- Single person
- Bachelor
- Single adult (LDS Church)
