= Logan Utah Temple =

Temple in Logan, Utah

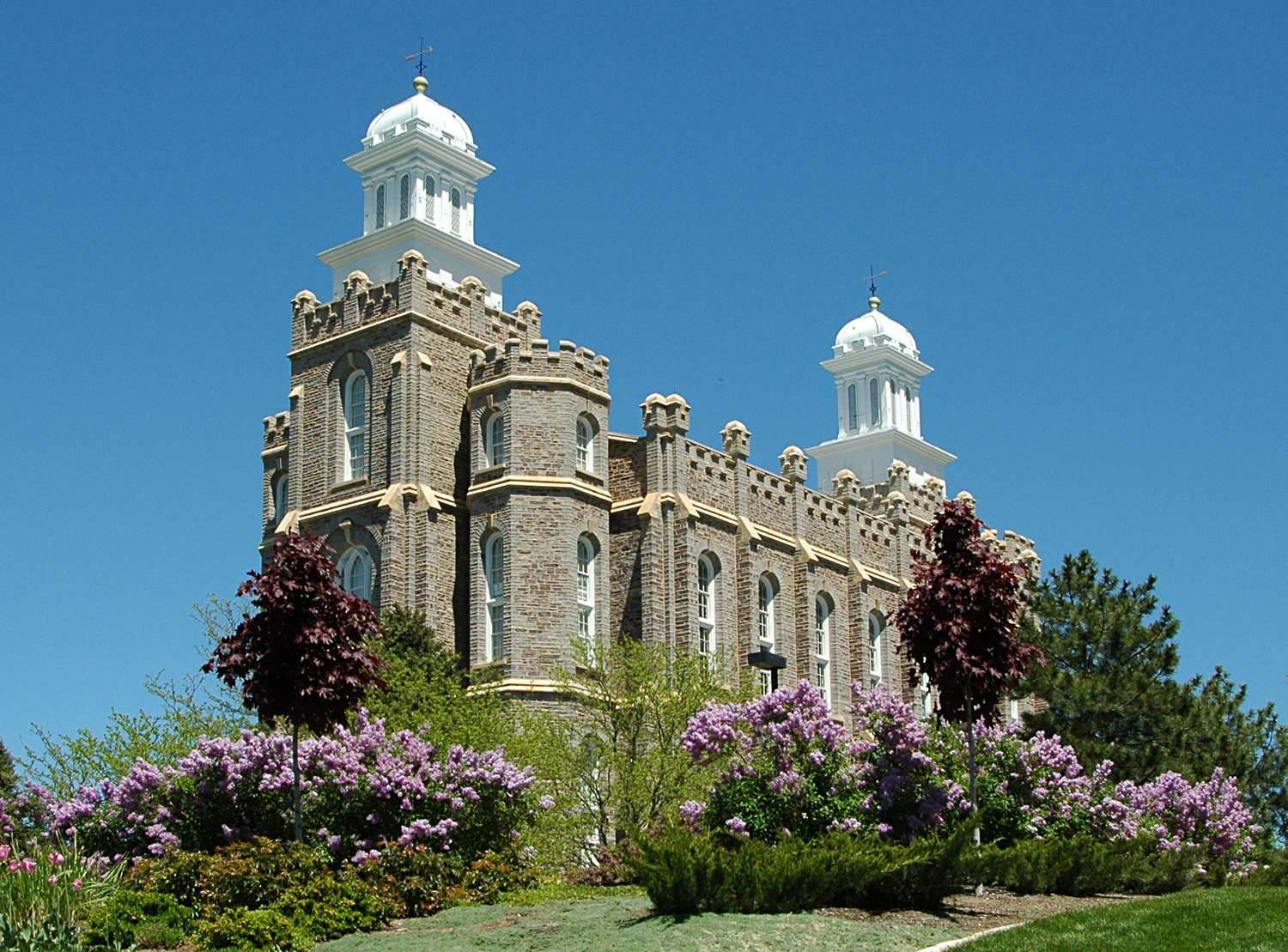
- Interactive map of Logan Utah Temple
- Number: 2
- Dedication: May 17, 1884, by John Taylor
- Site: 9 acres (3.6 ha)
- Floor area: 119,619 ft^{2} (11,113.0 m^{2})
- Height: 170 ft (52 m)
- Official website • News & images

Church chronology
← St. George Utah Temple	Logan Utah Temple	→ Manti Utah Temple

Additional information
- Announced: October 6, 1876, by Brigham Young
- Groundbreaking: May 17, 1877, by John Willard Young
- Open house: February 5 – March 3, 1979 (after renovations)
- Rededicated: March 13, 1979, by Spencer W. Kimball
- Current president: Jeffrey R. Burbank
- Designed by: Truman O. Angell
- Location: Logan, Utah, United States
- Coordinates: 41°44′2.979600″N 111°49′40.59480″W
- Exterior finish: Dark-colored siliceous limestone
- Design: Castellated Gothic
- Baptistries: 1
- Ordinance rooms: 4 (stationary)
- Sealing rooms: 11
- Clothing rental: Available

- Logan Temple
- U.S. National Register of Historic Places
- Location within Utah Location within the United States
- Location: Between 2nd and 3rd East and 1st and 2nd North, Logan, Utah
- Coordinates: 41°44′03″N 111°49′38″W
- Area: over 9 acres (3.6 ha)
- Built: 1884
- Architect: Truman O. Angell
- Architectural style: Gothic Revival
- NRHP reference No.: 75001801
- Added to NRHP: November 20, 1975

The Logan Utah Temple (formerly the Logan Temple) is a temple of the Church of Jesus Christ of Latter-day Saints. It was completed in 1884 and is the fourth temple built by the church. Located in the city of Logan, Utah, it was the second temple in Utah, after the St. George Temple. It was built on a 9-acre (3.6 ha) plot selected by church president Brigham Young.

The temple was announced on October 6, 1876, by Young during the church's general conference. The Salt Lake Temple had been announced in 1847, but construction was still underway and would not be completed until 1893, so the Logan and St. George temples were built to satisfy the church's need for temples. A groundbreaking ceremony was held on May 18, 1877, conducted by Orson Pratt with John W. Young breaking the ground.

The temple has a castellated exterior, a style it shares with the Manti Utah Temple. The Logan Temple was crafted by head church architect Truman O. Angell, using a blend of Gothic Revival architecture with a French Renaissance style.

== History ==
The temple in Logan was announced by Brigham Young on October 6, 1876, with its groundbreaking taking place on May 18, 1877. This ceremony was presided over by Orson Pratt and attended by local church members and community leaders. At the time of the groundbreaking, the nine-acre temple site had not actually been purchased by the church. The church did not officially acquire the land until April 24, 1878–a year after ground had been broken and construction had begun.

The site for the temple was selected by Brigham Young based on the view it offered of the surrounding valley and the suitability of the ground. The temple site had been held in reserve for many years. It was used as a park and public grounds before being dedicated as the temple site.

The preliminary plans called for a five-story structure of more than 59,000 square feet. While it was initially believed that the temple could be built in three years using only volunteer labor, in actuality it took seven years to build. A combination of hired hands and volunteers were used with wards providing quotas of volunteers. Donations to the temple could be made in the form of labor, materials or money. More than 25,000 people worked on the temple's construction. Timber for the building was hauled from the Temple Fork area of Logan Canyon. Lime and quartzite were quarried out of nearby Green Canyon. The sandstone for water tables, caps and window ledges came from Franklin quarry in Idaho. Most of the quarried materials were extracted during winter when farm duties were low and because transporting material was easier on sled than wagon. As completion of the temple neared, women in the area were asked to make carpets for the temple. The women spent two months working to hand make 2,144 square yards of carpet.

The temple was dedicated on May 17, 1884 by John Taylor. It was the only temple Taylor dedicated during his tenure as church president.

In 1896–97 the Logan Temple Barn was built to house the animals belonging to members of the Church who were working at or attending the nearby Logan Temple. The temple barn fell into disuse after automobiles began to bring worshipers to the temple and was sold in 1919.

A $50,000 renovation project was undertaken from July 9, 1915, to January 11, 1916. As part of this project electricity was installed in the temple. In 1917, a fire started in a closet under the grand staircase in the central north part of the main building. It completely destroyed the oval staircase which connected the first through the third floors. It caused approximately $40,000 in damage and took about three months to repair.

The Logan Temple was placed on the National Register of Historic Places on November 20, 1975.

== Design and architecture ==
The temple was the second temple to be completed in Utah and is the church's sixth largest. The temple has a total floor area of 115,507 square feet (10,731.0 m^{2}) with 4 ordinance rooms, 11 sealing rooms (used to perform marriages), and one baptistry. Because the upper room occupies the entire floor, 6 trusses were used across the width of the building to secure it. Due to the height of the building and inclement weather during construction, many of the doors, windows, door frames, sashes, etc. were made offsite in a carpentry shop, then installed later.

Architect Truman O. Angell’s design had two towers and was based on the same pattern as the Salt Lake Temple, with a large assembly hall and other similar rooms. The building’s architectural form is a combination of Gothic Revival and French Renaissance styles, along with traditional Latter-day Saint temple design.

Site

The temple sits on a nine-acre plot, and the landscaping around the temple features a pioneer-inspired oval reflecting pool. These elements are designed to provide a tranquil setting that enhances the sacred atmosphere of the site.

Exterior

The structure stands five stories tall and is primarily constructed with dark siliceous limestone. Buff-colored limestone was used for the more intricate carved details. Initially the dark siliceous limestone was painted a pinkish color, but after 1900 the paint was allowed to fade. The castellated exterior is characterized by two domed cupolas and two octagonal towers, each chosen for their symbolic significance and alignment with temple traditions. The design incorporates elements that are reflective of both the local culture and the broader church symbolism.

Interior

Initially, the interior featured muraled ordinance rooms for live-action presentation of temple ceremonies. However, these murals were removed during the 1976 renovation to allow for a motion-picture presentation of the ceremonies, like other temples, and were replaced with 1970s-style interior design. The temple's four ordinance rooms are each decorated in a different color scheme, and the celestial room features a large crystal chandelier. The layout is designed to create a spiritually uplifting environment which represents one's journey through life. In addition to the ordinance rooms and the celestial room, the temple includes a baptistry and 11 sealing rooms. Symbolic elements are integrated into the design, providing deeper meaning to the temple's function and aesthetics.

Symbols

Incorporated into the design are symbolic elements which are typical of both Latter-Day Saint architecture and medieval religious architecture, providing spiritual meaning to the temple's appearance and function. Symbolism is an important subject to members of the Church.

One of the most prominent symbols incorporated into the temple’s design is the towers to the east and west, which represent the Melchizedek and Aaronic priesthoods, respectively. Additionally, five-pointed stars can be seen on the exterior of the temple, a common religious symbol in the Middle Ages, representing the five wounds of Christ. The specific version of the five-pointed star used on the temple is called the "Star of the Morning", which is used in the book of Revelations as a title for God. The star points downward, with an elongated bottom ray which represents that “the Savior has descended from heaven to earth.”

The temple not only serves as a place of worship but also stands as an architectural landmark in Logan. This was the first temple to have muraled ordinance rooms for the endowment.

== Renovations ==
In 1949, the temple was remodeled and received updated lighting, heating, air conditioning, elevators, and other modern conveniences. Over the years, the temple has undergone several renovations to preserve its structural integrity, update facilities, and enhance its spiritual and aesthetic appeal. The most significant renovation project commenced in 1976 and the interior was completely gutted and redone. The roof was also removed, and at one point only the exterior walls were left standing. The renovation expanded the temple’s original 59,130 square footage to 115,507 square feet. New electrical, heating, and AC systems were added. One of the notable aspects of the renovation was the removal of pioneer-era murals from the interior. The muraled ordinance rooms were replaced with separate ordinance rooms which were equipped for motion-picture versions of temple ceremonies. These changes were made to ensure the temple's compliance with contemporary building standards and to accommodate the evolving needs of the church and its members. After remodeling, the temple was rededicated on March 13, 1979, by church president Spencer W. Kimball.

The temple grounds were renovated in 2009. Heated sidewalks were added to help with heavy snowfall, and an oval reflecting pool replaced a 1970s-style water feature.

On April 7, 2019, Russell M. Nelson stated during the church’s general conference that the temple would be renovated alongside the Salt Lake Temple and other pioneer-era temples. As of May 2024, no closing dates or renovation plans have been announced.

== Cultural and community impact ==
In the early days of the temple, it housed the Logan Temple Association (LTA) School. The dedicatory prayer for the temple mentioned the importance of education, and the Kirtland Temple had previously housed a school, so it was decided that the Logan Temple would be a place of learning as well as a house of the Lord. The wards and stakes from the area surrounding the temple selected delegates to form the LTA. The Association decided to establish a “School of Science for the promotion of learning,” which would teach a variety of subjects but refrain from teaching anything that might deny the existence of God. Books were donated to the school by the local community, and the school opened with 155 students on September 5, 1885. School attendance declined over the years, and the LTA was disbanded in 1912.

After construction many of the volunteers became skilled in their work and were eventually able to open their own businesses in masonry, woodwork, etc. Remnants of the temple construction, such as 500 tons of rock from Green Canyon quarry and sandstone from Franklin quarry were sold to construct Brigham Young College and Smithfield Tabernacle.

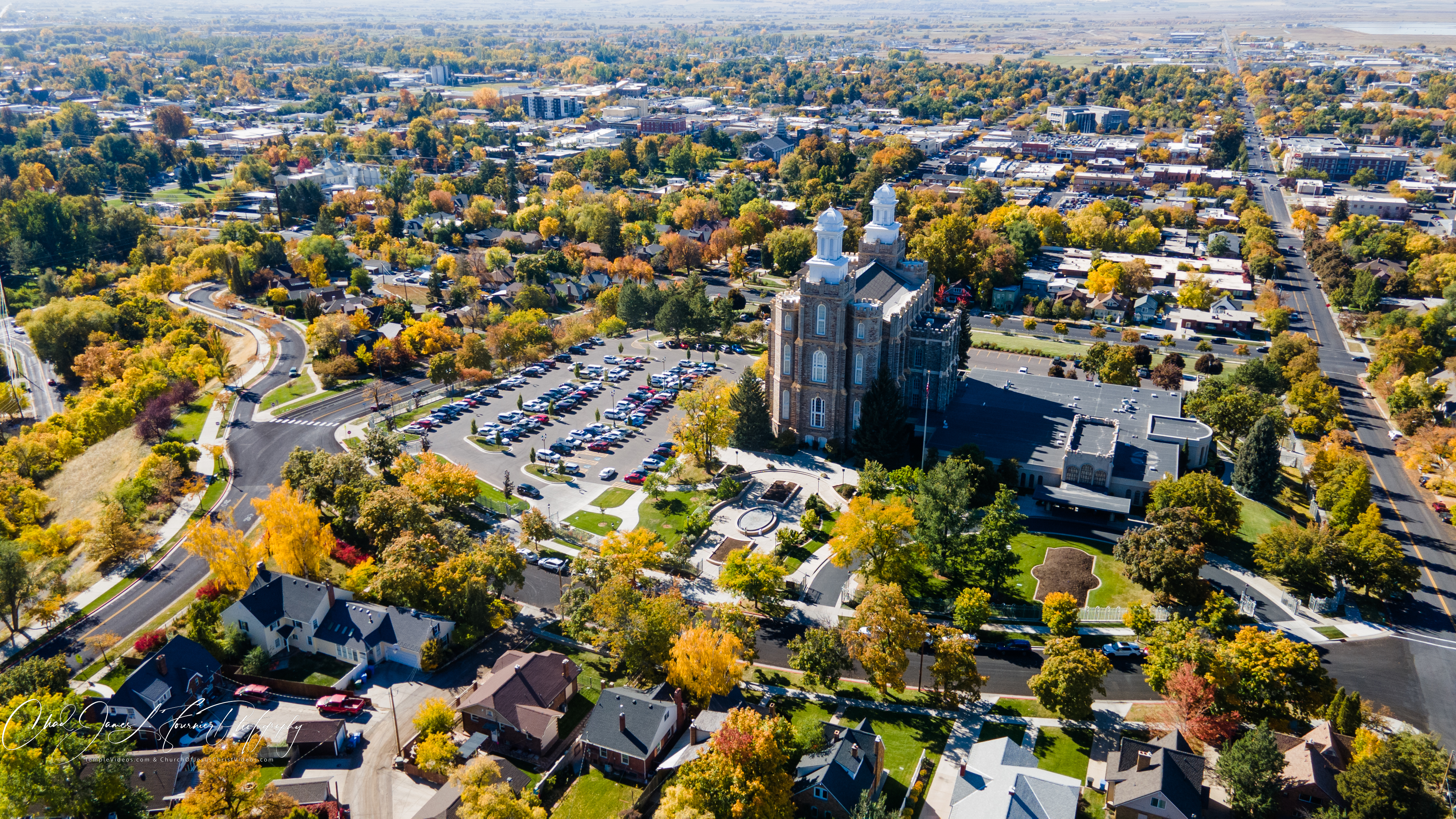
Logan Utah Temple

== Temple presidents ==
Since its dedication in 1884, the temple has been overseen by a series of temple presidents, each typically serving for a term of three years. The temple president oversees the administration of temple operations and provides spiritual guidance for both patrons and staff.

Logan's first temple president was Marriner W. Merrill, who served from 1884 to 1906. Other notable presidents include: William Budge (1906–18); ElRay L. Christiansen (1943–52); and W. Rolfe Kerr (2008–11). As of September 2023, Jeffrey R. Burbank is the temple president.

== Admittance ==
Like all temples of the church, the temple is not used for Sunday worship services. To members of the church, temples are regarded as sacred houses of the Lord. Once dedicated, only church members with a current temple recommend can enter for worship.

== See also ==
Temples in Utah
Wasatch Front Temples
Temples along the Wasatch Front
- = Operating
- = Under construction
- = Announced
- = Temporarily Closed

- The Church of Jesus Christ of Latter-day Saints in Utah
- Comparison of temples of The Church of Jesus Christ of Latter-day Saints
- List of temples of The Church of Jesus Christ of Latter-day Saints
- List of temples of The Church of Jesus Christ of Latter-day Saints by geographic region
- Temple architecture (Latter-day Saints)
- Logan Temple Barn
