= Ruth H. Funk =

American Mormon leader (1917–2011)

7th Young Women General President
- 1972 – 1978
- Called by: Harold B. Lee
- Predecessor: Florence S. Jacobsen
- Successor: Elaine A. Cannon

Utah State Board of Education

In office
- 1985 – 1992
- Political party: Republican Party

Personal details
- Born: Ruth Hardy; February 11, 1917; Chicago, Illinois, US
- Died: February 5, 2011 (aged 93); Salt Lake City, Utah, US
- Resting place: Wasatch Lawn Memorial Park; 40.6978°N 111.8417°W
- Home town: Salt Lake City, Utah, US
- Alma mater: University of Utah
- Spouse(s): Marcus C. Funk
- Children: 4
- Parents: Thomas F. Hardy; Polly A. Reynolds
- Website: Ruth Hardy Funk

Ruth Hardy Funk (February 11, 1917 – February 5, 2011) was the seventh general president of the Young Women organization of the Church of Jesus Christ of Latter-day Saints (LDS Church) from 1972 to 1978.

== Biography ==
Born in Chicago, Illinois, Ruth Hardy was raised in Salt Lake City, Utah. A musician who excelled at classical piano, she attended the University of Utah and earned a degree in music in 1938. On December 31, 1938, Ruth married Marcus C. Funk in the Salt Lake Temple. They moved to Chicago shortly thereafter so Marcus could attend dental school at Northwestern University.

When Funk moved back to Salt Lake City, she became a member of the general board of the YWMIA. In 1972, LDS Church president Harold B. Lee asked Funk to succeed Florence S. Jacobsen as the president of the organization. During her administration, the Young Womanhood Recognition and the Personal Progress programs were initiated. In 1972, the Young Men's Mutual Improvement Association and the Young Women's Mutual Improvement Association were merged and renamed Aaronic Priesthood MIA Young Women. This merge was only temporary, however, and in 1974 the organizations were separated again and renamed the Young Men and the Young Women. In 1978, Funk was released and was succeeded by Elaine A. Cannon.

After her tenure as Young Women president, Funk served as the chair of the Governor's Commission on the Status of Women in Utah and has been a member of the board of directors of Bonneville International Corporation. For eight years, she served as a member and chair of the Utah State Board of Education.

She died peacefully in her Salt Lake City home on February 5, 2011, surrounded by her children.

Funk is a descendant of the prominent nineteenth-century Mormon George Reynolds.

== See also ==
- Ardeth G. Kapp, Funk's second counselor

The Church of Jesus Christ of Latter-day Saints titles
| Preceded by Florence S. Jacobsen | Young Women General President; 1972–1978 | Succeeded by Elaine A. Cannon |
