= Logan Temple Barn =

- U.S. National Register of Historic Places
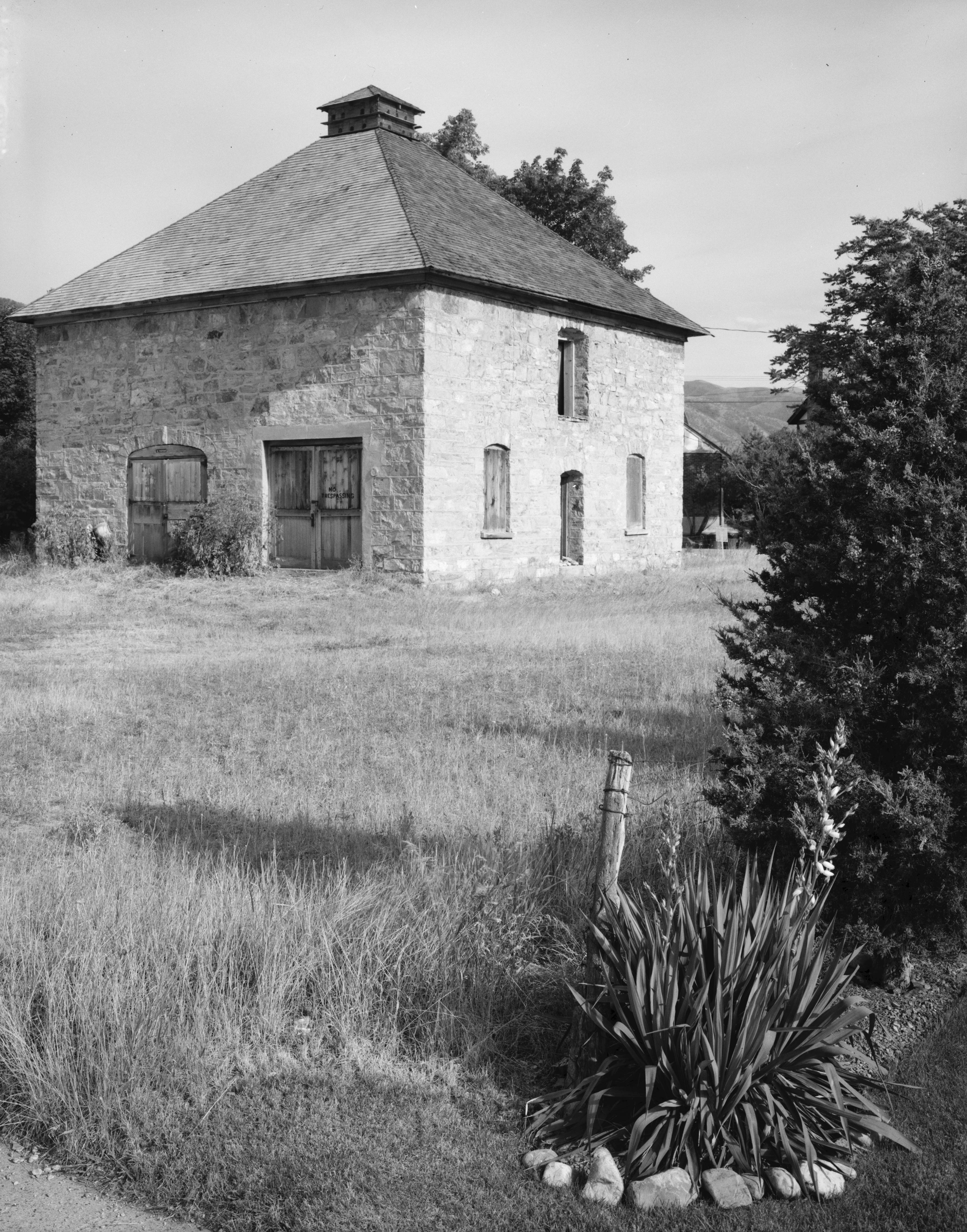
- Logan Temple Barn in 1985

- Location within Utah Location within the United States
- Location: 368 E 200 N, Logan, Utah
- Coordinates: 41°44′6″N 111°49′27″W
- Area: less than one acre
- Built: 1897
- NRHP reference No.: 85003199
- Added to NRHP: December 19, 1985

The Logan Temple Barn was built in Logan, Utah in 1896–97 to house the animals belonging to members of the Church of Jesus Christ of Latter-day Saints working at or attending the nearby Logan Temple. It is unique as one of only two stone barns in the Cache Valley, where wood-frame barns prevailed. The temple barn fell into disuse after automobiles began to bring worshipers to the temple and was sold in 1919, becoming an automobile repair shop. The owner at the time was Thomas B. Budge, who owned the Utah-Idaho Hospital across the street, later the William Budge Memorial Hospital. During the 1980s a conversion to apartment use was proposed but not pursued.

== Description ==
The Logan Temple Barn is a 36-foot (11 m) by 36-foot (11 m) square two-story stone structure with a pyramidal wood single roof. A pigeon-house cupola was added to the top by its first private owner. The front and rear elevations have double doors to the ground floor, and there is an original doorway on the east side. Two more openings on the east and west sides were added in 1919 using concrete lintels in lieu of the original openings' stone arches and lintels. There is a hayloft door on the eastern side and several old and new window openings on all sides. The interior is dominated by a central bearing wall supporting the wood framed floor and roof.

The Logan Temple Barn was placed on the National Register of Historic Places on December 19, 1985.
