= Fireside (LDS Church) =

LDS Church supplementary meeting

A fireside is a supplementary meeting in the Church of Jesus Christ of Latter-day Saints (LDS Church), often held in the evening.

The term "fireside" was first used in the 1930s for a variety of such meetings in the LDS Church. The official use of the term has been discontinued and largely replaced with "devotional" or "discussion", but "fireside" continues to be used informally by members.

Firesides are commonly held for a subset of members (youth, Young Single Adults, Single Adults, quorums, wards, etc.) of a congregation or congregations in an area. A fireside is most commonly held on Sunday evenings, but may be held any day of the week. They are often held in a meetinghouse, Institute of Religion, or a personal residence, depending on the number of people expected to attend. Often, refreshments are served afterwards while the attendees mingle amongst themselves.

A fireside usually either consists of a single speaker on a religious topic or a group discussion led by a church leader. They typically last between one and two hours. Sometimes, firesides are broadcast via satellite to stake centers and Institutes of Religion throughout the world.

The first church-wide radio firesides were broadcast for youth in 1960. Since 1992, monthly firesides for young adults have been produced by the Church Educational System (CES) and broadcast by satellite throughout North America. In 2015, these CES Devotionals were renamed as Worldwide Devotionals for Young Adults.
