= Ardeth G. Kapp =

Canadian cleric and writer (1931–2024)

9th Young Women General President
- 1984 – 1992
- Called by: Spencer W. Kimball
- Predecessor: Elaine A. Cannon
- Successor: Janette H. Beckham

Second Counselor in the Young Women General Presidency
- 1972 – 1978
- Called by: Ruth H. Funk
- Predecessor: Dorothy P. Holt
- Successor: Norma B. Smith

Personal details
- Born: March 19, 1931; Glenwood, Alberta, Canada
- Died: March 30, 2024 (aged 93)
- Spouse(s): Heber B. Kapp

Ardeth Greene Kapp (March 19, 1931 – March 30, 2024) was the ninth Young Women general president of the Church of Jesus Christ of Latter-day Saints (LDS Church) from 1984 to 1992.

== Early life ==
Ardeth Greene was born on March 19, 1931, in Cardston, Alberta, to Edwin Kent Greene and Julia Leavitt Greene. Shortly after her birth her family moved to Glenwood, Alberta. She was baptized into the LDS Church on April 4, 1939 in the Cardston Temple. In 1947, she underwent life-threatening surgery due to an ear infection.

== Biography ==
In 1949, Kapp graduated from Brigham Young High School in Provo, Utah. She received academic degrees from the University of Utah and Brigham Young University (BYU). Kapp is the author of 20 books and a series of television programs created by the Utah Education Network. She was for a time part of the faculty of BYU.

Kapp was the second counselor to Ruth H. Funk in the church's Young Women General Presidency from 1972 to 1978. In April 1984, Kapp succeeded Elaine A. Cannon as the organization's president. During her tenure, Kapp had five different counselors, including Elaine L. Jack, Janette C. Hales, and Patricia T. Holland. In 1992, Kapp was succeeded by Hales. For part of her time as Young Women general president, Russell M. Nelson was the organization's priesthood advisor. He would regularly seek Kapp's advice as he composed his talks for general conference. During Kapp's tenure, the Personal Progress program—which focused on preparing young women to enter the temple—was initiated.

From 1992 to 1995, Kapp and her husband, Heber B. Kapp, served as leaders of the Canada Vancouver Mission. From 2000 to 2003, they were president and matron of the Cardston Alberta Temple.

She died on March 30, 2024.

== Publications ==
- Ardeth G. Kapp (1977). Miracles in Pinafores & Bluejeans (Salt Lake City, Utah: Deseret Book) ISBN 0-87747-644-6
- —— (1978). The Gentle Touch (Salt Lake City, Utah: Deseret Book) ISBN 0-87747-724-8
- —— (1979). Echoes From My Prairie (Salt Lake City, Utah: Bookcraft) ISBN 0-88494-384-4
- —— (1981). More Miracles in Pinafores & Bluejeans (Salt Lake City, Utah: Deseret Book) ISBN 0-87747-890-2
- —— (1985). The Light and the Life (Salt Lake City, Utah: Bookcraft) ISBN 0-88494-559-6
- —— (1987). I Walk By Faith (Salt Lake City, Utah: Deseret Book) ISBN 0-87579-072-0
- —— (1990). My Neighbor, My Sister, My Friend (Salt Lake City, Utah: Deseret Book) ISBN 0-87579-299-5
- —— (1992). The Joy of the Journey (Salt Lake City, Utah: Deseret Book) ISBN 0-87579-633-8
- —— (1996). What Latter-day Stripling Warriors Learn from Their Mothers (Salt Lake City, Utah: Deseret Book) ISBN 1-57345-164-9
- —— (1997). Rejoice! His Promises are Sure (Salt Lake City, Utah: Deseret Book) ISBN 1-57345-233-5
- —— (1998). Lead, Guide, and Walk Beside (Salt Lake City, Utah: Deseret Book) ISBN 1-57345-439-7
- —— (2000). The Little Book of Big Ideas About Friendship (Salt Lake City, Utah: Deseret Book) ISBN 1-57345-829-5
- —— (2003). The Temple, Our Home Away from Home (Salt Lake City, Utah: Deseret Book) ISBN 1-57008-910-8
- —— (2005). Better than You Think You Are (Salt Lake City, Utah: Deseret Book) ISBN 1-59038-380-X
- —— (2007). The Joy of Believing (Salt Lake City, Utah: Deseret Book) ISBN 1-59038-809-7
- —— (2012). Doing What We Came to Do: Living a Life of Love (Salt Lake City, Utah: Deseret Book) ISBN 978-1-60908-743-2

== Books ==
- Janet Peterson and LaRene Gaunt (1993). Keepers of the Flame: Presidents of the Young Women (Salt Lake City: Deseret Book) pp. 137–157
- "Ardeth Greene Kapp: Young Women General President," Ensign, May 1984, p. 98.

The Church of Jesus Christ of Latter-day Saints titles
Preceded by Elaine A. Cannon	Young Women General President; 1984–1992	Succeeded by Janette Hales Beckham
Preceded by Dorothy P. Holt	Second Counselor in the Young Women General Presidency; 1972–1978	Succeeded by Norma B. Smith
