= Logan Institute of Religion =

LDS educational facility in Utah

Coordinates: 41.743198°N 111.814863°W

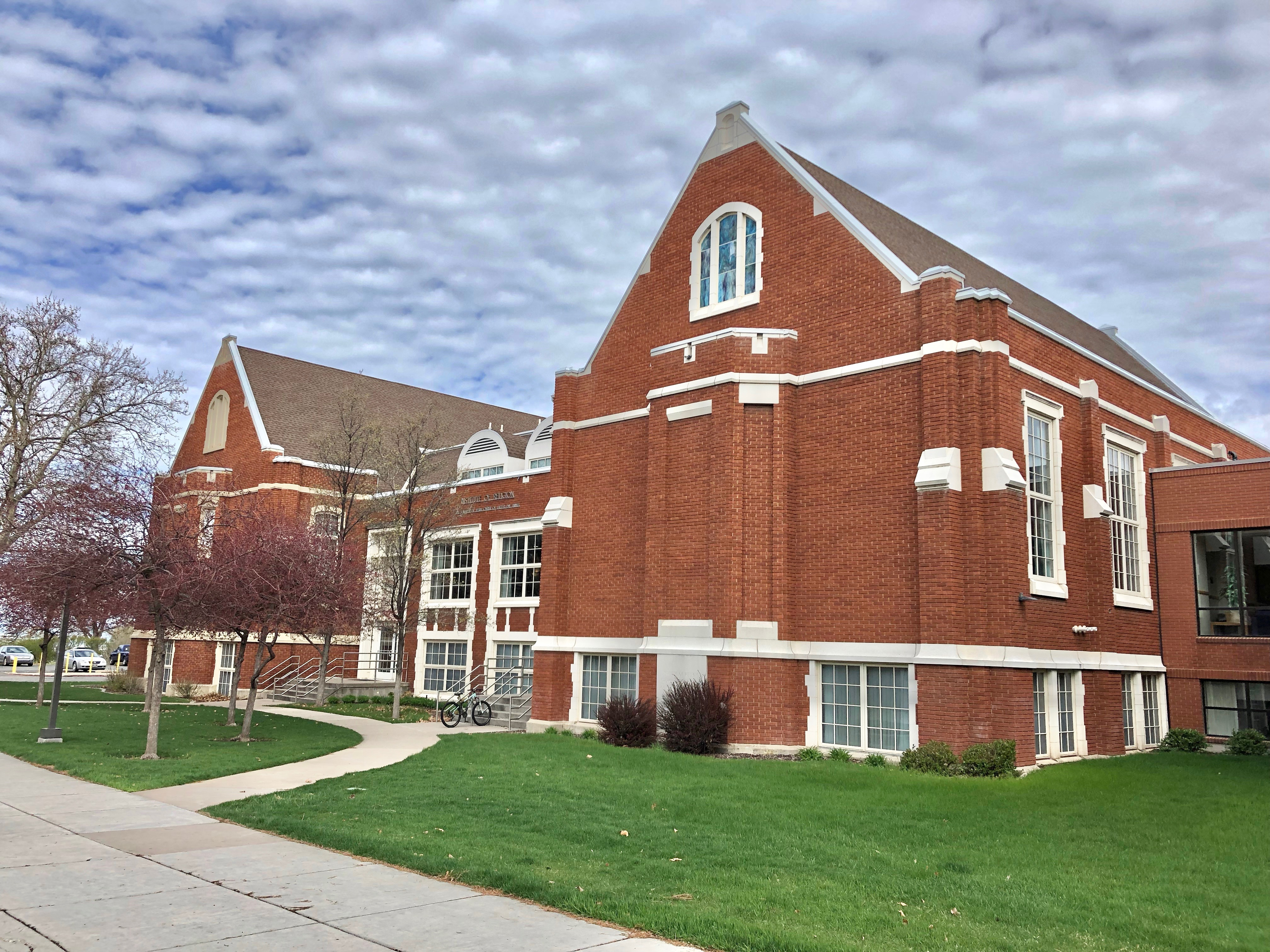
- Formation: 1929
- Purpose: Religious Education
- Parent organization: The Church of Jesus Christ of Latter-day Saints
- Website: instituteinlogan.org

The Logan Institute of Religion is a Latter-day Saint institute of religion located in Logan, Utah, adjacent to the campus of Utah State University. Operated by the Church Educational System of the Church of Jesus Christ of Latter-day Saints, it provides religious education courses for young adults and serves as an activity hub and meeting location for local Latter-day Saint student congregations. Following its opening in 1929, it has undergone multiple expansions and was replaced by a new two-story facility completed in 2025.

== History ==
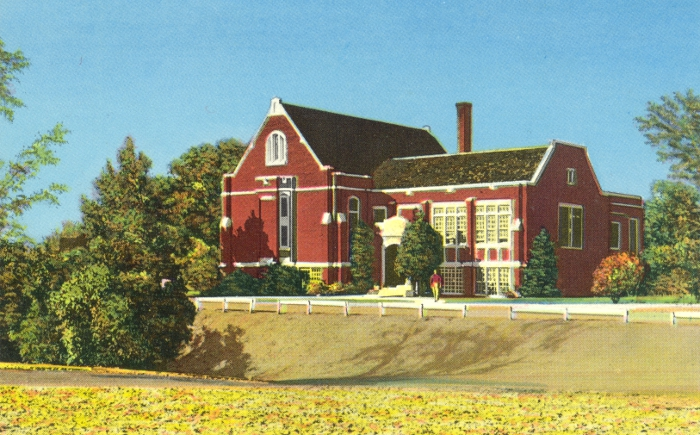
Painting of the Logan Institute of Religion c.1940

The Logan Institute was dedicated by LDS Church president Heber J. Grant on March 31, 1929. At its opening, enrollment totaled 114 students, with courses offered in Bible literature and moral philosophy. The institute's first class graduated on May 26, 1935, and had 21 students. Thomas C. Romney was the first institute director and the only instructor until Milton R. Hunter was hired in 1936.

=== Original building ===
Construction on the Logan Institute began in 1928 as the first institute of religion in the state of Utah. It has since been expanded with five additions which led to the building-block feel as different sections were added over time.

Additions to the original building

1929	Opening included one chapel, lounge, library, and classrooms.
1938	Added a ballroom, game room, two kitchens, and an apartment for the director (now offices).
1960	Doubled the building with a second chapel, six classrooms, a cultural hall, and offices.
1977	Added a larger library, student lounge, and instructor offices.
1990	Added the southeast wing with six classrooms and offices for local church leaders.
1994	Added a full-size gymnasium for sports, events, and weekly devotionals.

On January 25, 2012, a small fire occurred in a second-floor kitchen, causing an estimated $18,000 in damage. The fire began when a box of apples was left on a stove burner. Subsequent repairs included safety upgrades such as the installation of a sprinkler system on the building’s upper level.

=== Current building ===
In March 2023, the original structure was demolished to make way for a new facility. The current two-story, 100,000-square-foot building was completed on October 31, 2025, and dedicated on November 23, 2025, following a public open house.

The new building is U-shaped around a central courtyard accessible from Darwin Avenue and includes an underground parking structure with space for 170 vehicles. The side facing the Utah State University campus features extensive glasswork on the ground level.

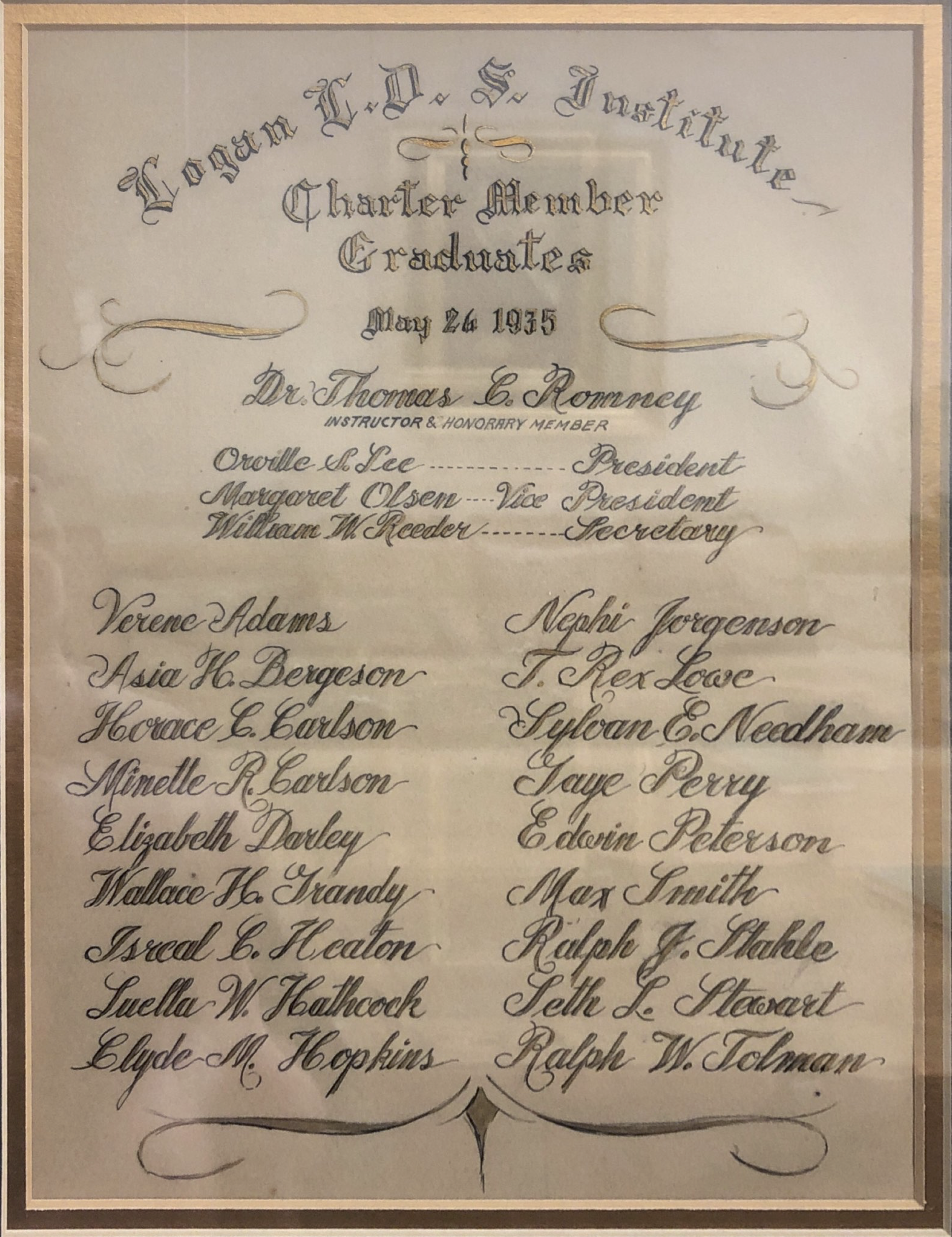
Logan Institute's first graduating class

== Features of the original building ==
=== Organs ===
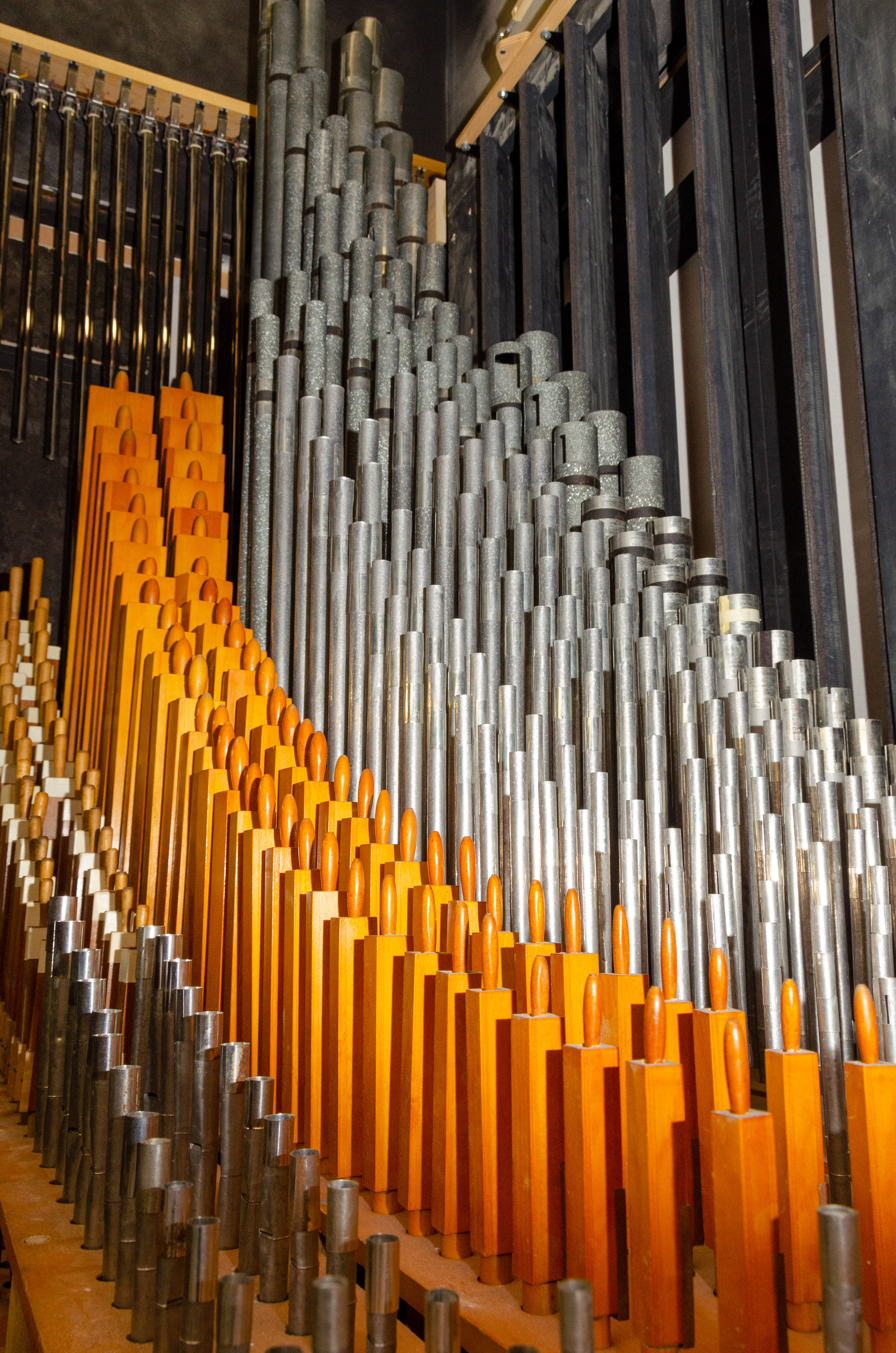
Organ pipes in the west chapel

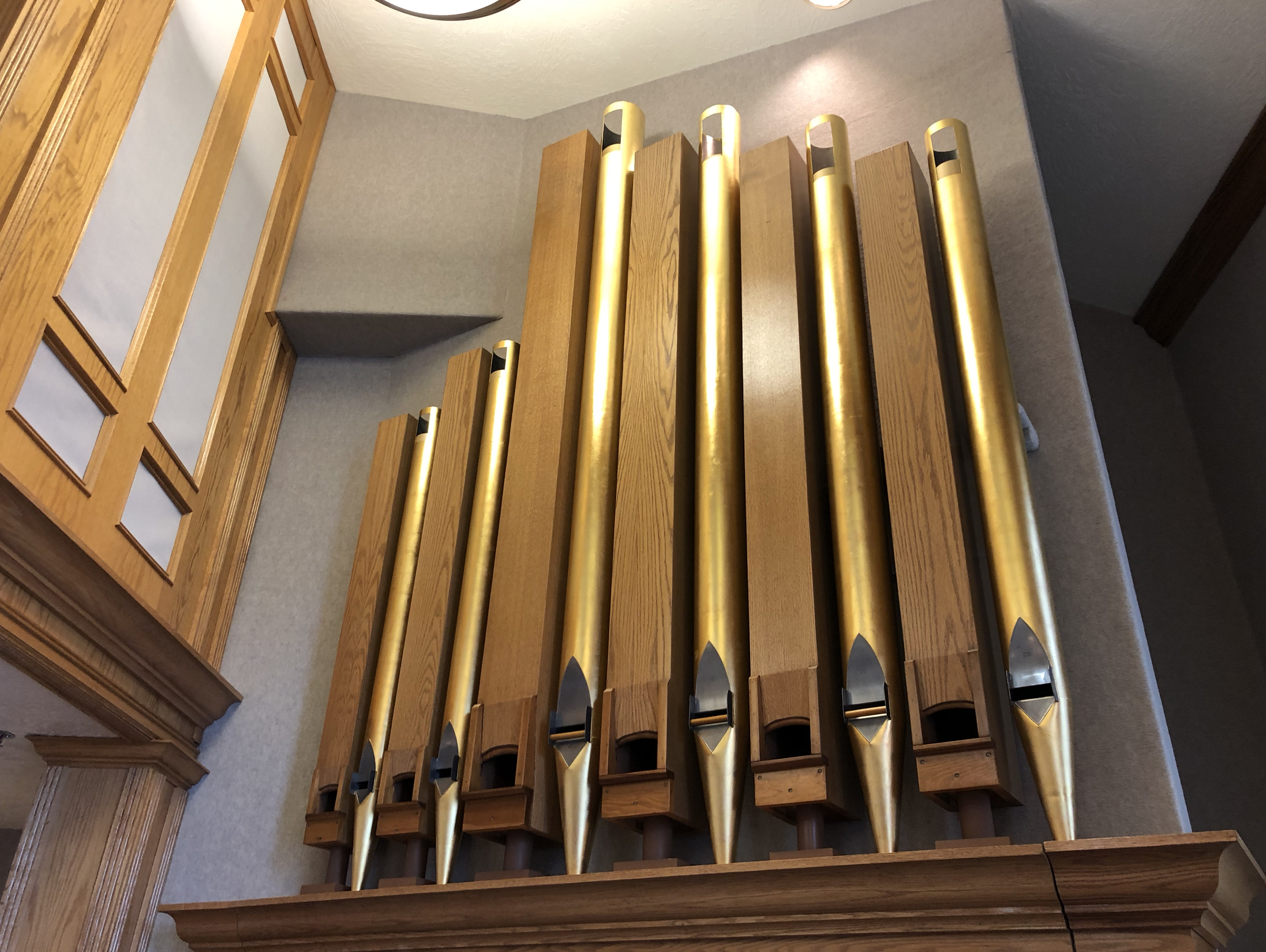
Unenclosed pipes

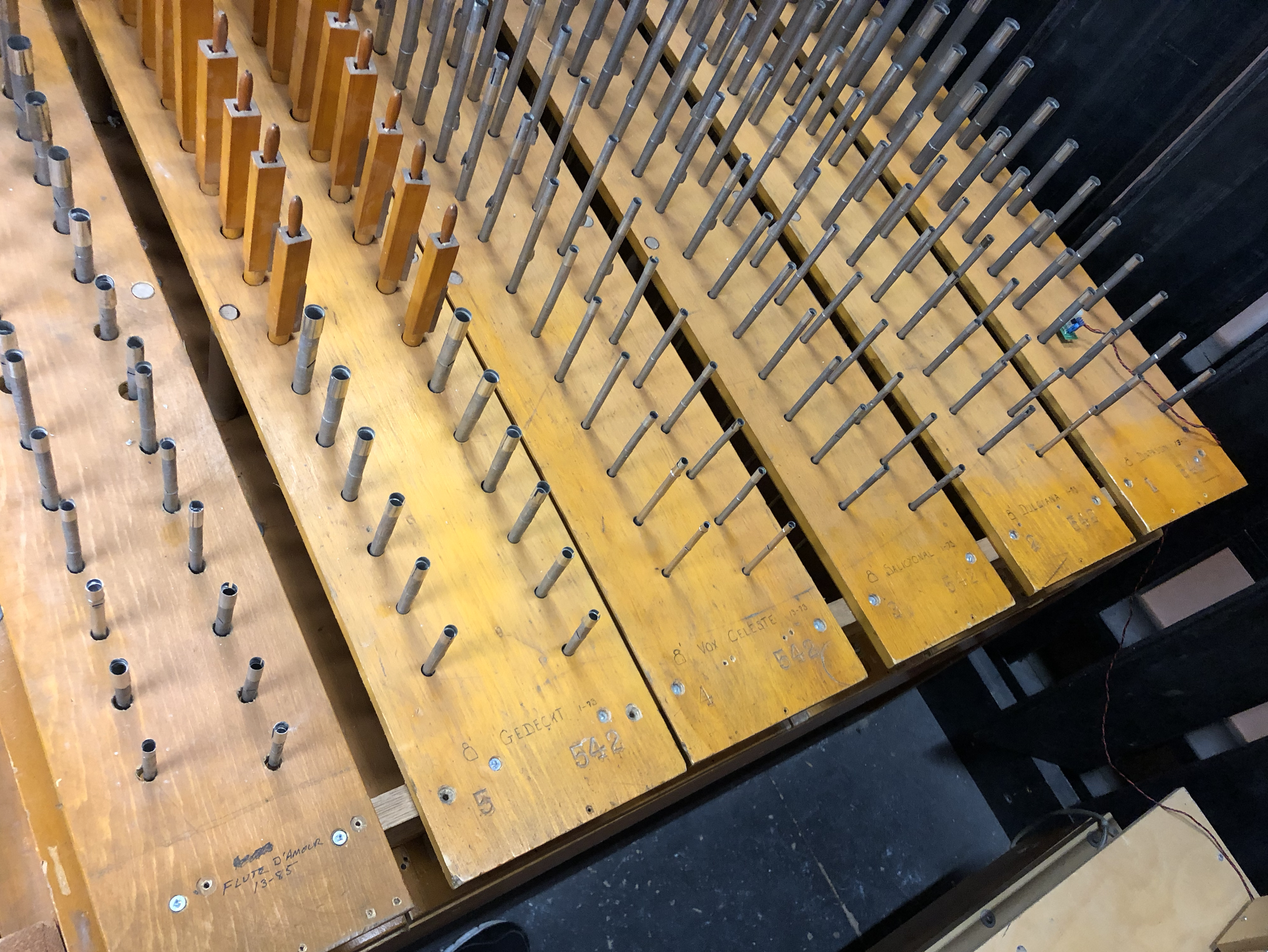
Names of pipes

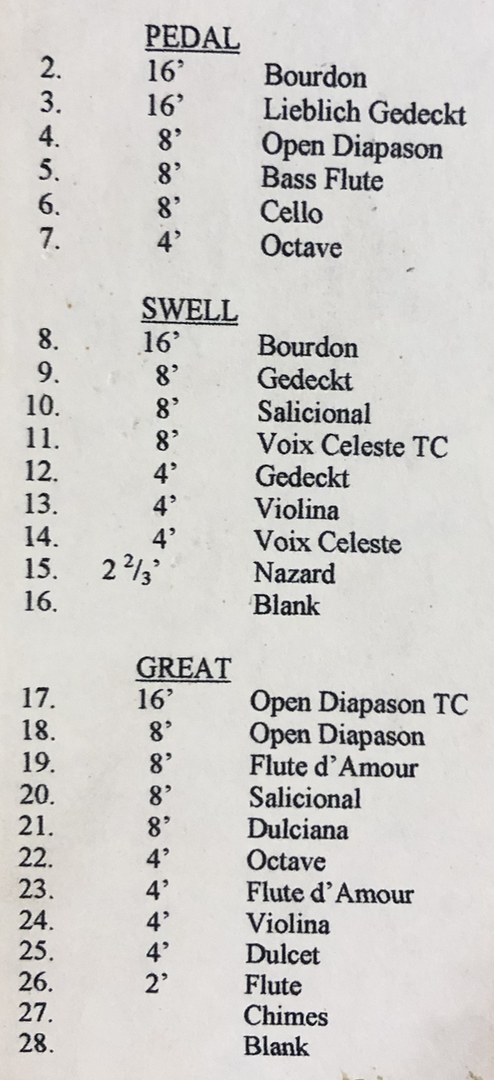
Voice list

The institute's west chapel contained a hybrid organ built by Anderson Organ Works with twenty-nine stops. Twenty-one of the stops were voiced by six ranks of pipes, with the remaining eight voices provided by speakers located within the swell box. The swell box also housed a rank of chimes, although the chimes were not playable from the organ console.

The institute had an additional three electronic organs: one in the east chapel; one in the gym used for weekly devotionals; and one that traveled with the institute choirs. Throughout the building there were also five grand pianos, and various upright pianos located in classrooms.

=== Art and artifacts ===
The Joseph Smith Student Lounge had a 10' x 26' mural of the sacred grove painted by Kent Wallis. The west chapel originally had a stained glass window, but after later renovations the window was only visible from the attic area.

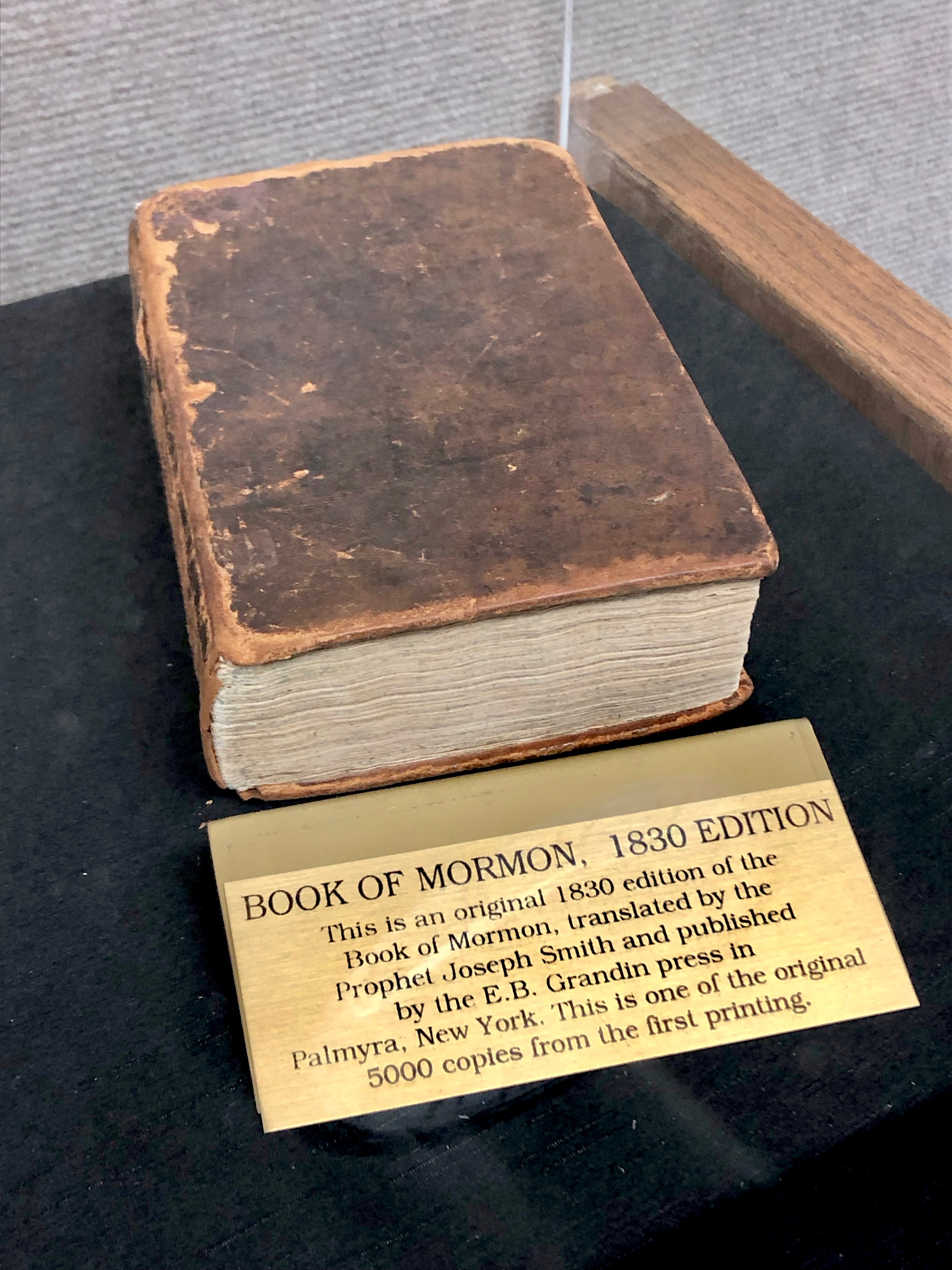
Library copy of 1830 edition Book of Mormon

The library was the largest in the state for an institute of religion and contained several items of historic value, including an original copy of the Book of Mormon and a 1906 sacrament set from the Mendon ward. Before the building was demolished in 2023, some of the library's contents were moved to the Church History Library.

== Student involvement ==
=== Student council ===
Student activities and events at the institute are organized by the local chapter of the Latter-day Saint Student Association (LDSSA). According to the Encyclopedia of Mormonism, LDSSA is "an organization which sponsors social, religious, and recreational activities for LDS college students and their friends." It was organized in 1966, with Richard Eyre serving as its first president.

LDSSA is led by the Logan Institute Student Council. The student council consists of seven presidencies who each lead a different LDSSA committee.

As of the 2025, the Logan LDSSA consists of the following committees:

- Digital media
- Recreation
- Just Serve
- Feed My Sheep
- Dance/Date
- Campus Relations And Missionary Work

=== Choirs ===
The Logan Institute's first choir, the Delta Phi Chorus, was organized in 1957 to serve as "ambassadors of good will for the institute." Today, the institute has two different choirs: the Logan Institute Choir and the Logan Institute Singers (formally the Latter-day Voices). The Logan Institute Choir is open for all students to join, and typically has 200-300 members. The Logan Institute Singers is by audition only, and will travel to perform in other venues, such as in seminaries.

The two choirs often combine to perform for special events such as semiannual concerts, the Joseph Smith Memorial Devotional, and for events held on Temple Square in Salt Lake City. The combined choir has performed for several worldwide young adult devotionals held in the Salt Lake Tabernacle when church general authorities have spoken, such as Lynn G. Robbins (2015) and Carl B. Cook (May 2019). A choir from the Logan Institute also performed in the church's general conference in April 2016 and April 2023.

== Devotionals ==
=== Religion in Life ===
Religion in Life devotionals are held weekly in the gymnasium. Often, speakers are local church leaders or other influential figures. Other members of the community have also spoken such as when USU president Noelle E. Cockett spoke in September 2017.

=== Joseph Smith Memorial ===
The Joseph Smith Memorial devotional series is held annually in honor of Smith, founder of the Latter Day Saint movement. It is scheduled as close as possible to December 23, Smith's birthday, and is usually held in USU's Smith Spectrum. The first devotional was held in 1944, and past speakers have included all who have served as church presidents since that time.
