= W. Rolfe Kerr =

American Mormon leader

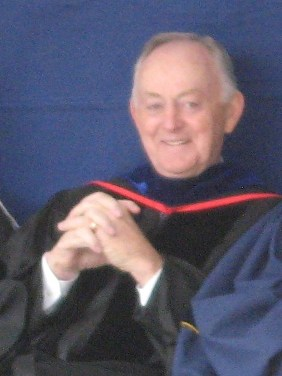

Emeritus General Authority
- October 6, 2007

First Quorum of the Seventy
- April 5, 1997 – October 6, 2007
- End reason: Granted general authority emeritus status

Second Quorum of the Seventy
- April 6, 1996 – April 5, 1997
- End reason: Transferred to First Quorum of the Seventy

Personal details
- Born: William Rolfe Kerr; June 29, 1935 (age 90); Tremonton, Utah, United States

William Rolfe Kerr (born June 29, 1935) is an emeritus general authority of the Church of Jesus Christ of Latter-day Saints (LDS Church). He served previously as the fifteenth Commissioner of Church Education and as president of the Logan Utah Temple.

Kerr was born in Tremonton, Utah, and grew up on a farm. He earned a bachelor's degree in agriculture from Utah State University (USU), where he was also the quarterback on the football team. He intending to spend his life farming, until he was offered a position as coordinator of student activities at USU after his military service. He later received a master's degree in marriage and family relations and a doctorate in education. He served an LDS Church mission in the British Mission. While at USU, Kerr played football and was the starting quarterback in 1958.

== Career ==
Kerr made his career in the field of learning, serving in administrative positions at USU, Weber State College and the University of Utah.

=== President of Dixie State College ===
From 1976 to 1980 he was president of Dixie State College of Utah (DSC). Under his leadership, DSC began a cooperative education work program. He also worked to increase ties and cooperation between the college and the surrounding community.

=== Executive Vice President of Brigham Young University ===
Kerr was executive vice president of Brigham Young University from 1980 to 1984. Stephen R. Covey quoted Kerr's personal mission statement in The Seven Habits of Highly Effective People.

=== Commissioner of the Utah System of Higher Education ===
Kerr had been serving as commissioner of the Utah System of Higher Education since 1985 when he was called as president of the church's Texas Dallas Mission in 1993.

== LDS Church service ==
Kerr also served in the LDS Church as a stake president, bishop's counselor, high councilor, and on the Sunday School General Board. For two years in the 1960s, he was involved in helping organize the LDS Student Association. While still serving in Dallas, Kerr was called as a general authority and member of the Second Quorum of the Seventy on April 6, 1996, and was transferred to the First Quorum of the Seventy on April 5, 1997. As a general authority, he served in a number of area presidencies prior to being appointed as the Commissioner of the Church Educational System (CES) in 2005. He was released from the First Quorum of the Seventy and granted emeritus status on October 6, 2007, but remained as CES commissioner until being released on August 1, 2008, when he was succeeded by Paul V. Johnson. He then served as president of the Logan Utah Temple from 2008 to 2011.

== Personal life ==
Kerr met Janeil Raybold at USU and they were married September 15, 1960, in the Logan Temple and have six children.

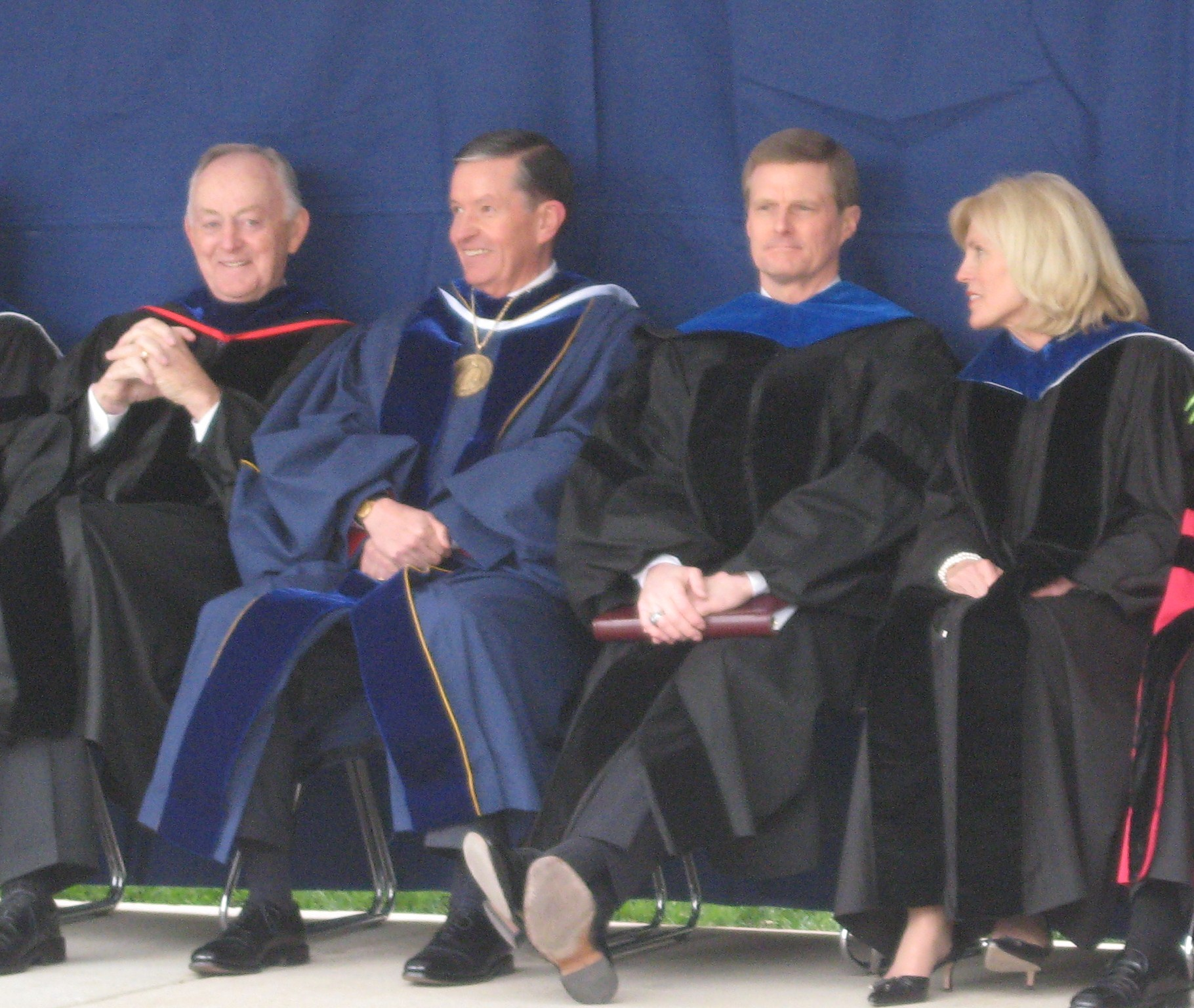
Kerr at the April 2008 BYU Commencement with Cecil O. Samuelson, Elaine S. Dalton, and David A. Bednar.

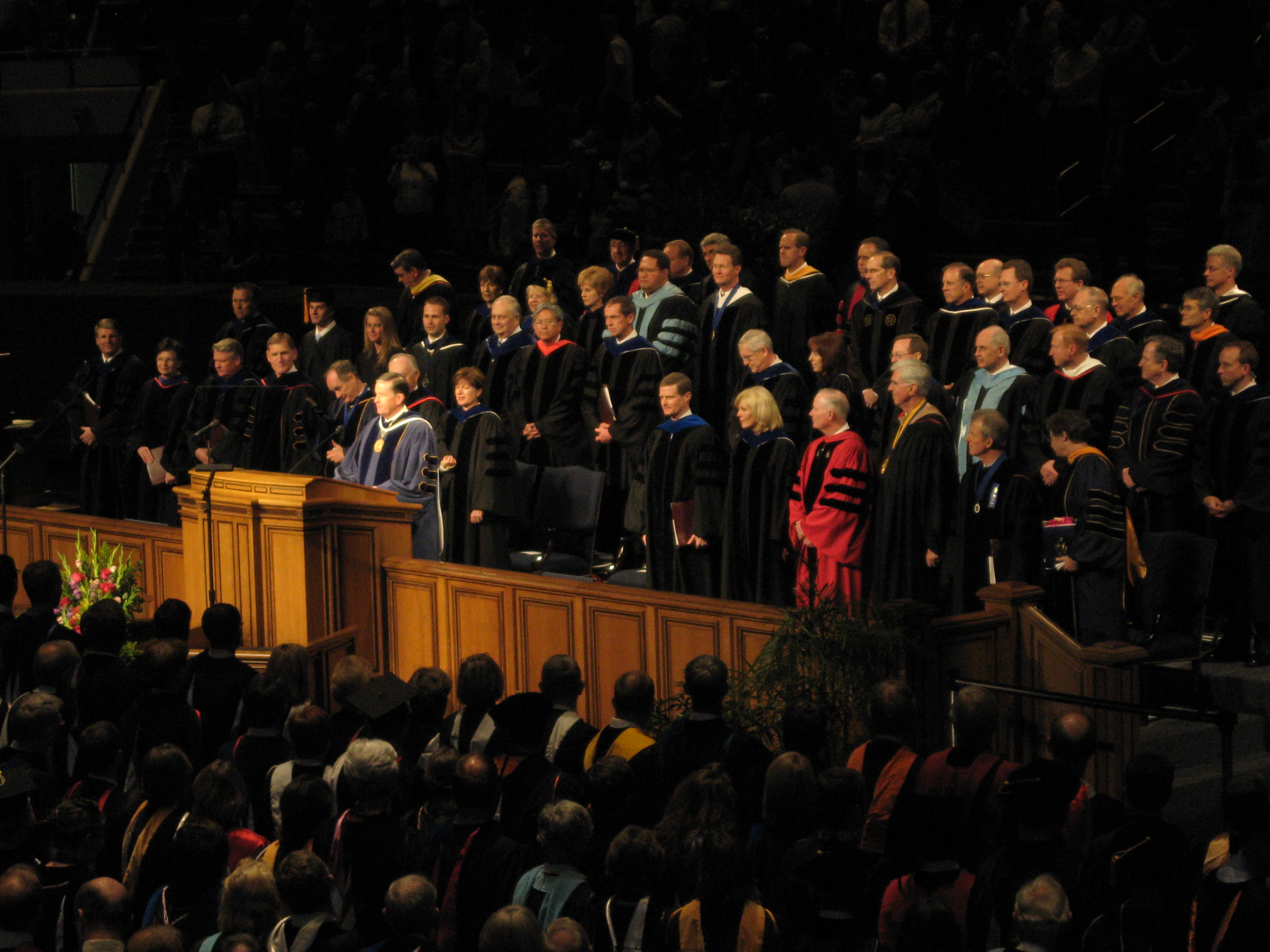
Kerr at the April 2008 BYU graduation ceremony

== See also ==
- Elaine A. Cannon
