= Henry D. Taylor =

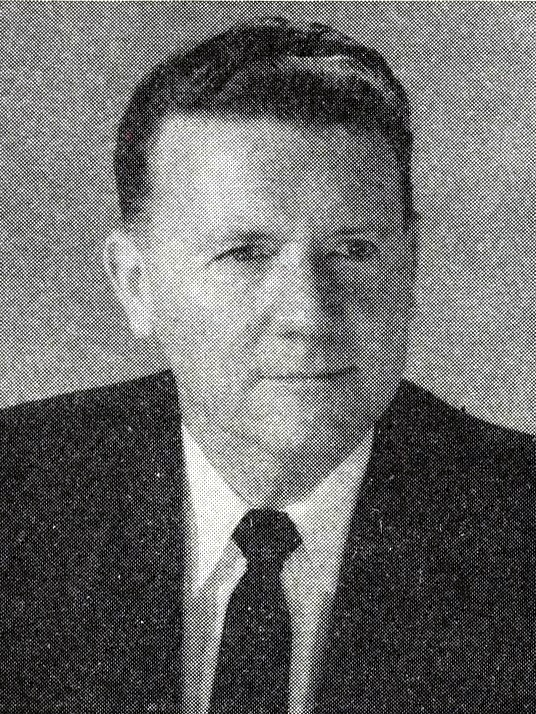

Emeritus General Authority
- September 30, 1978 – February 24, 1987

First Quorum of the Seventy
- October 1, 1976 – September 30, 1978
- End reason: Granted general authority emeritus status

Assistant to the Quorum of the Twelve Apostles
- April 6, 1958 – October 1, 1976
- End reason: Position abolished

Personal details
- Born: Henry Dixon Taylor; November 22, 1903; Provo, Utah, United States
- Died: February 24, 1987 (aged 83); Salt Lake City, Utah, United States
- Resting place: Provo City Cemetery; 40°13′30″N 111°38′39.84″W
- Alma mater: Brigham Young University
- Spouse(s): Alta Hansen; Ethelyn Peterson
- Children: Henry D. Taylor Jr. Anthony H. Taylor; Stephen K. Taylor; David A. Taylor
- Parents: Arthur N. Taylor(1929–1986); Maria Dixon(1986–1987)

Henry Dixon Taylor (November 22, 1903 – February 24, 1987) was a general authority of the Church of Jesus Christ of Latter-day Saints (LDS Church) from 1958 until his death.

Taylor was born in Provo, Utah. As a young man, he served as a missionary for the LDS Church in the Eastern States Mission. During his mission, Taylor was the president of the church's Connecticut District.

Taylor received a bachelor's degree from Brigham Young University (BYU) and a master's degree from New York University. For most of his life he was employed by his family's mercantile business, Dixon–Taylor–Russell Home Furnishers in Utah County.

From 1944 to 1946, Taylor was bishop of the Pleasant View Ward in Provo, Utah. He then served as president of the Sharon Stake, and then the Sharon East Stake after the Sharon Stake was split. The Sharon Stake covered a large part of Orem as well as all of Provo, north of the BYU campus. The Sharon East Stake was essentially the Provo part of the old Sharon Stake. Taylor served as a stake president until he was called as president of the church's California Mission in 1955. On 6 April 1958, Taylor was called as a general authority and Assistant to the Twelve. In 1976, when the position was abolished, Taylor became a member of the First Quorum of the Seventy. He acted in this capacity until 30 September 1978, when he was designated as an emeritus general authority.

Taylor married to Alta Hansen on December 26, 1929 and they were the parents of four sons. In 1986 after his wife had died, he married Ethelyn Peterson. Taylor died in Salt Lake City, Utah and was buried in Provo.
