= Single adult (LDS Church) =

Single adult is a term used in the Church of Jesus Christ of Latter-day Saints (LDS Church) to describe any unmarried person age 18 or older. A more specific term, "young single adult" (YSA), describes singles ages 18–35. Effective July 18, 2024, the age for YSA was increased from 30 to 35 to reflect that people are marrying later.

== Single adult ==
Single adult generally refers to unmarried adults age 36 and older in the LDS Church. The First Presidency and the Quorum of the Twelve Apostles have taught that "marriage between a man and a woman is ordained of God and that the family is central to the Creator's plan for the eternal destiny of His children." While this family unit is perceived as the ideal, many church members are single.

== Young single adult ==
YSA is a category used in the LDS Church to describe an unmarried adult between the ages of 18 and 35. The purpose of the church's YSA program is to "provide enhanced opportunities for them to serve in leadership positions, to teach, and to lead."

There are activities arranged within the church that allow YSA to mingle, get to know one another, and spend time with people of their own age group, standards, and beliefs. The activities range from fun-based activities such as dances or weekend conferences, to religious instruction such as Institute of Religion classes or firesides.

== Young single adult wards ==
A ward in the LDS Church is usually geographically constructed, but exceptions are made such as for wards for a specific language or for YSAs if the size of 125 to 225 for a ward is maintained (50 for a branch). Formerly, the LDS Church maintained student wards and singles wards, but now YSAs, depending on their location, may have the option to attend a YSA ward composed of other unmarried singles ages 18–35.

== See also ==
- LDS Student Association
- Mormons
