= Sigma Gamma Chi =

Defunct LDS collegiate fraternity

- ΣΓΧ
- Founded: 1967; 59 years ago University of Utah
- Type: Religious
- Affiliation: Independent
- Status: Defunct
- Defunct date: 2011
- Emphasis: Latter-day Saints
- Scope: National
- Motto: "Service to God and Country"
- Pillars: Spirituality, Brotherhood, Service, Leadership, Scholarship, and Patriotism
- Member badge
- Chapters: 105
- Members: 15,000 lifetime
- Headquarters: Salt Lake City, Utah; United States

Sigma Gamma Chi (ΣΓΧ) was a fraternal organization sponsored by the Church of Jesus Christ of Latter-day Saints (LDS Church). Although it once was a national organization, it later only operated at the University of Utah where it was established in 1967. The last chapter closed in 2011.

== History ==
Sigma Gamma Chi originated with Lambda Delta Sigma, a fraternity for Latter-day Saints founded in 1936 by Lowell L. Bennion, director of the University of Utah's Institute of Religion. Soon afterward it also admitted women into its membership. In 1967, the LDS Church assumed management and divided the organization, making Lambda Delta Sigma a sorority and creating Sigma Gamma Chi as its fraternity.

For decades the organization expanded and grew, creating new chapters within Sigma Gamma Chi and the sister organization Lambda Delta Sigma, and women outnumbered men 6 to 1. There were several charters at campuses throughout the United States. The fraternity's community service projects included repairs to the Jewish Community Center and creating Christmas baskets for the needy. It also sponsored dances and parties for young men to socialize with young women.

In 1978, Sigma Gamma Chi absorbed Delta Phi Kappa, the fraternity for returned missionaries. By 1999 it held 15,000 members in 105 chapters. In June 2000, it was announced that the fraternity would be absorbed by the new church organization Institute Men's Association in September 2000. The seventy chapters that were active at the time were allowed to keep their Greek letter name but functionally became chapters of the Institute Men’s Association. Eventually, the fraternity declined until it only remained at the University of Utah where at one time it had as many as thirteen chapters.

In 2011, the LDS Church closed all groups still operating as fraternities and sororities, replacing the remaining twelve chapters of Sigma Gamma Chi with non-collegiate "young single adult" congregations for Mormons between ages eighteen and thirty.

== Symbols and traditions ==
The Greek letters Sigma Gamma Chi were selected to stand for "Service to God and Country", the fraternity's motto. The fraternity's six ideals or pillars were spirituality, brotherhood, service, leadership, scholarship, and patriotism.

== Membership ==
Membership in Sigma Gamma Chi was open to anyone who wanted to join. Members were required to attend an institute class and live according to standards of the LDS Church. They also attended weekly chapter meetings.

== Organization ==
At the University of Utah, Sigma Gamma Chi had twelve chapters (Alpha, Beta, Chi, Delta, Iota, Mu, Nu, Pi, Rho, Sigma, Phi, and Xi). Chapters met weekly on either Wednesday or Thursday night. Meetings were held at the LDS Institute of Religion to the South of the University of Utah campus at 1780 East South Campus Drive. Sigma Gamma Chi was led by the Inter Chapter Council composed of a president and officers he selected from the twelve chapters. A chapter president led each chapter and assigned other officers from within the chapter.

Sigma Gamma Chi elected a new president annually to replace the previous president. Officer positions included president, vice president, secretary, and pledge trainer.

== Chapters ==
Sigma Gamma Chi had the following known chapters, with inactive chapters and institutions in italics. The fraternity originally had two Greek letters for each chapter's name. However, one chapter's letters conflicted with the lettering of another recognized fraternity, so all chapters were forced to reduce to single Greek letters.

Chapter	Charter date and range	Institution	Location	Status	Ref.
Alpha	1967	University of Utah	Salt Lake City, Utah	Inactive	
Beta		University of Utah	Salt Lake City, Utah	Inactive	
Delta		University of Utah	Salt Lake City, Utah	Inactive	
Iota		University of Utah	Salt Lake City, Utah	Inactive	
Mu		University of Utah	Salt Lake City, Utah	Inactive	
Nu		University of Utah	Salt Lake City, Utah	Inactive	
Xi		University of Utah	Salt Lake City, Utah	Inactive	
Pi		University of Utah	Salt Lake City, Utah	Inactive	(Note: Pi was formerly known as Pi Rho)
Rho		University of Utah	Salt Lake City, Utah	Inactive	
Phi		University of Utah	Salt Lake City, Utah	Inactive	
Chi		University of Utah	Salt Lake City, Utah	Inactive	
	1978	Arizona State University	Tempe, Arizona	Inactive	(Note: Formed from a chapter of Delta Phi Kappa, established in 1951.)
		Boise State University	Boise, Idaho	Inactive	
	1978	Brigham Young University	Provo, Utah	Inactive	(Note: From a chapter of Delta Phi Kappa, established in 1929.)
		Dixie State University	St. George, Utah	Inactive	
		Fullerton City College and California State University, Fullerton	Fullerton, California	Inactive	
	1978	Idaho State University	Pocatello, Idaho	Inactive	(Note: Formed from a chapter of Delta Phi Kappa, established in 1966.)
		Knoxville Institute of Religion	Knoxville, Tennessee	Inactive	
		LDS Business College	Salt Lake City, Utah	Inactive	
		Long Beach City College	Long Beach, California	Inactive	
		Orange Coast College	Costa Mesa, California	Inactive	
	1978	Ricks College	Rexburg, Idaho	Inactive	(Note: Formed from a chapter of Delta Phi Kappa, established in 1949.)
Delta Epsilon		Salt Lake Community College	Salt Lake City, Utah	Inactive	
		San Diego State University	San Diego, California	Inactive	
		Snow College	Ephraim, Utah	Inactive	
	1978	Southern Utah University	Cedar City, Utah	Inactive	(Note: Formed from a chapter of Delta Phi Kappa, established in 1965.)
		University of Idaho	Moscow, Idaho	Inactive	
Mu Eta Pi		University of New Mexico	Albuquerque, New Mexico	Inactive	
		University of Southern California	Los Angeles, California	Inactive	
		University of Tennessee	Knoxville, Tennessee	Inactive	
		University of Utah	Salt Lake City, Utah	Inactive	
		University of Wyoming	Laramie, Wyoming	Inactive	
	1978	Utah State University	Logan, Utah	Inactive	(Note: Formed from a chapter of Delta Phi Kappa, established in 1927)
	1978	Weber State College	Ogden, Utah	Inactive	

== See also ==
- LDS Student Association
