= D. James Cannon =

American politician (1919–1998)

Donald James Cannon (December 8, 1919 – March 5, 1998) was a member of the Utah House of Representatives from 1957 to 1959. He was also the Republican candidate for Governor of Utah in 1964 and ran unsuccessfully for mayor of Salt Lake City in 1967. He also coined the Utah slogan "the greatest snow on earth."

== Biography ==
Cannon was the son of Sylvester Q. Cannon and the husband of Elaine A. Cannon. James Cannon served as a Mormon missionary in Hawaii.

Cannon's Mormon Essays were published by Deseret Book in 1970. He also wrote a history of Sugar House, Utah.

Cannon also served as the executive director of the Utah Travel Council. It was in this position that he coined Utah's slogan.

Cannon was an alumnus of the University of Utah.

== Sources ==
- D. James Cannon at the MLCA Database
- Lambert, Maurice Reed. Scott R. Lambert, ed. All is Well, Mission to the Hawaiian Islands: 1941-44. p. 101
- political graveyard bio on Cannon
- Deseret News obituary
