= Paul H. Dunn =

American religious leader (1924–1998)

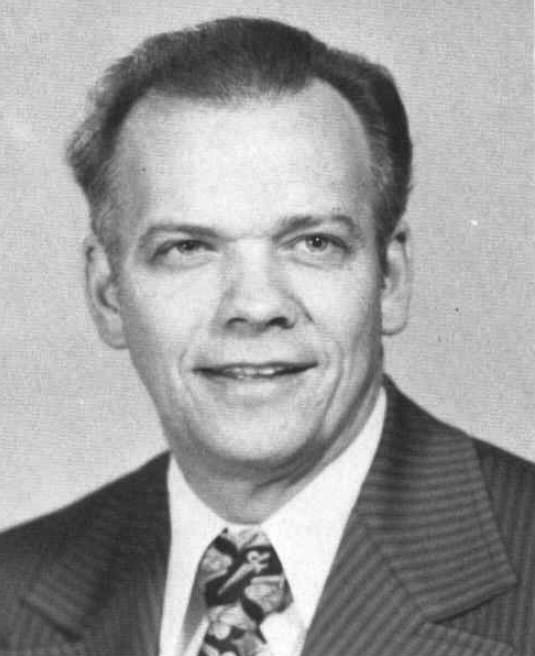

Emeritus General Authority
- September 30, 1989 – January 9, 1998
- Called by: Ezra Taft Benson

First Quorum of the Seventy
- October 1, 1976 – September 30, 1989
- Called by: Spencer W. Kimball
- End reason: Granted general authority emeritus status

Presidency of the First Quorum of the Seventy
- October 1, 1976 – February 22, 1980
- Called by: Spencer W. Kimball
- End reason: Honorably released

First Council of the Seventy
- April 6, 1964 – October 1, 1976
- Called by: David O. McKay
- End reason: Position abolished

Personal details
- Born: Paul Harold Dunn; April 24, 1924; Provo, Utah, United States
- Died: January 9, 1998 (aged 73); Salt Lake City, Utah, United States
- Resting place: Wasatch Lawn Memorial Park; 40.6978°N 111.8417°W

Paul Harold Dunn (April 24, 1924 – January 9, 1998) was a general authority of the Church of Jesus Christ of Latter-day Saints (LDS Church). Dunn was widely considered one of the most dynamic speakers among the general authorities in the 1970s and 1980s. In 1991, Dunn stated that he had "not always been accurate" in his speeches and writings after it was reported that he "made up many of the stories about baseball and battle he told as personal experiences".

== Biography ==
Born in Provo, Utah, to Joshua Harold Dunn and Geneve Roberts, Dunn was baptized a member of the LDS Church at the age of eight. Dunn earned a bachelor's degree from Chapman College in 1953 and master's and doctorate degrees in educational administration from the University of Southern California.

In 1952, Dunn began his professional career as a seminary teacher for the Church Educational System in Los Angeles. On April 6, 1964, LDS Church president David O. McKay called Dunn as a general authority and member of the First Council of the Seventy. While in this position, Dunn was the president of the church's New England Mission from 1968 to 1971.

In 1976, Dunn became a member of the newly constituted First Quorum of the Seventy. Dunn was a member of this quorum until he was designated an emeritus general authority on October 1, 1989. Additionally, Dunn served as a member of the Presidency of the Seventy from 1976 to 1980. Dunn wrote over 50 books during his time as a general authority.

Dunn married Jeanne Alice Cheverton on February 27, 1946, and they were the parents of three daughters. Dunn was named Utah's Father of the Year in 1972. He died of cardiac arrest in Salt Lake City while recovering from back surgery in 1998.

== Scandals ==
=== AFCO Enterprises, Inc fraud involvement ===
Dunn was a director of AFCO Enterprises, Inc., a property development company in the 1970s and early 1980s. In 1982 the company went bankrupt and in September 1983 the principal owner, Grant C. Affleck, was arrested for defrauding investors out of between $20–$50 million. Dunn's image was a prominent part of the promotional material provided to potential investors. Dunn said that he resigned from the company in 1978 because AFCO was exploiting his connection to the LDS Church. However, AFCO continued to provide Dunn with a new car every year until 1982, and Dunn continued to regularly attend AFCO board meetings until the company went bankrupt. In a sworn deposition Dunn stated his only role had been to deliver prayers and inspirational messages; however, evidence at Affleck's trial showed that Dunn had backdated his resignation from the company, and had continued to seek new investors and called creditors on the company's behalf into the 1980s.

=== Falsified experiences ===
During his time as a general authority, Dunn often included in his speeches and books extraordinary "real life" experiences that he claimed were from his past. In the late 1980s, a number of investigators, including Arizona Republic reporter Lynn Packer and church critics Jerald and Sandra Tanner, accused Dunn of fabricating or embellishing many of these events. Among Dunn's claims that came to be questioned were:

- that Dunn had played major league baseball with the St. Louis Cardinals;
- that Dunn was one of only six in his 1,000-man combat group who survived World War II, and was the only one of the six survivors who wasn't wounded;
- that Dunn was the sole survivor among 11 infantrymen in a 100-yard race against death, during which one burst of machine-gun fire ripped his right boot off, another tore off his ammunition and canteen belt and yet another split his helmet in half—all without wounding him.
- that Dunn's best friend died in his arms from serious injuries sustained in a battle on Okinawa.

When confronted with evidence that several of his stories were either completely falsified or substantially embellished, Dunn admitted that the stories were not completely true, yet continued to defend his use of the stories: "I haven't purposely tried to embellish or rewrite history. I've tried to illustrate points that would create interest. [I was] simply putting history in little finer packages." Dunn compared his stories to the parables of Jesus—although they were not true stories, they were nevertheless valuable means of teaching gospel principles.

In 1991, Dunn asked the church's First Presidency and Quorum of the Twelve Apostles for permission to issue an open letter to all Latter-day Saints. The church agreed, and on October 26 the following letter was published in the Church News, a supplement section of the Deseret News, a newspaper owned by the LDS Church:

October 23, 1991

I have been accused of various activities unbecoming a member of The Church of Jesus Christ of Latter-day Saints.

I confess that I have not always been accurate in my public talks and writings. Furthermore, I have indulged in other activities inconsistent with the high and sacred office which I have held.

For all of these I feel a deep sense of remorse, and ask forgiveness of any whom I may have offended.

My brethren of the General Authorities, over a long period of time, have conducted in-depth investigations of the charges made against me. They have weighed the evidence. They have censured me and placed a heavy penalty upon me.

I accept their censure and the imposed penalty, and pledge to conduct my life in such a way as to merit their confidence and full fellowship.

In making these acknowledgements, I plead for the understanding of my brethren and sisters throughout the Church and give assurance of my determination so to live as to bring added respect to the cause I deeply love, and honor to the Lord who is my Redeemer.

Sincerely, Paul H. Dunn

The exact nature of this "heavy penalty" imposed upon Dunn is unclear. It is clear that Dunn was not excommunicated from the church, though it is not known whether or not he was placed under some other form of church discipline, such as disfellowshipment or probation.
