= LDS Student Association =

An LDS Student Association (also known as a Latter-day Saint Student Association or LDSSA) is a social organization affiliated with the Church of Jesus Christ of Latter-day Saints (LDS Church) that helps LDS students connect with fellow Latter-day Saints during their time at university.

The Encyclopedia of Mormonism states:

The purposes of LDSSAs are to help college and university students stay closely affiliated with the church, succeed in their studies, and achieve a balanced educational-social life while on campus; to motivate LDS students to become a powerful influence for good on the campus; to provide meaningful activities that are consistent with church standards; and to coordinate church-related activities for college students.

Each LDSSA is affiliated with a post-secondary educational institution and the LDS Church. Membership is open to all students enrolled at the institution who espouse the purposes and standards of the LDSSA. Associate membership may be granted to non-students under special circumstances. Membership is not denied to anyone on the basis of race, religion, national origin, ethnicity, color, age, gender, marital status, citizenship, sexual orientation, veteran status, or disability. Some institute locations offer classes for students with learning disabilities or special needs. Members must keep LDSSA standards at LDSSA-sponsored events, which are the standards of the LDS Church. These standards include, but are not limited to: no acts of sexual immorality, no alcohol consumption or tobacco use, and no immodest attire.

== History ==
The LDSSA program was established in 1960, and LDSSAs exist in many locations where an institute of religion of the Church Educational System has been established. The institute advisory council—with counsel from faculty advisors—provides advice and guidance to the LDSSA and its members. One of the first LDSSA chapters was organized at the Logan Institute of Religion located adjacent to Utah State University.

LDSSA chapters at some schools (for example, Harvard College and the University of Virginia) are not formally governed by the LDS Church, as a result of official school requirements mandating the "local autonomy" of recognized campus organizations. However, they still interact with local institutes of religion and church organization structures in ways similar to other LDSSA chapters. One key difference is that these LDSSA chapters elect their president and other board officers, rather than having the institute advisory council nominate them.

W. Rolfe Kerr and Elaine A. Cannon were key figures in establishing the LDSSA program.

== See also ==
- Single adult (LDS Church)
- College religious organizations
