= Institute of Religion =

Young adult organization of the LDS Church

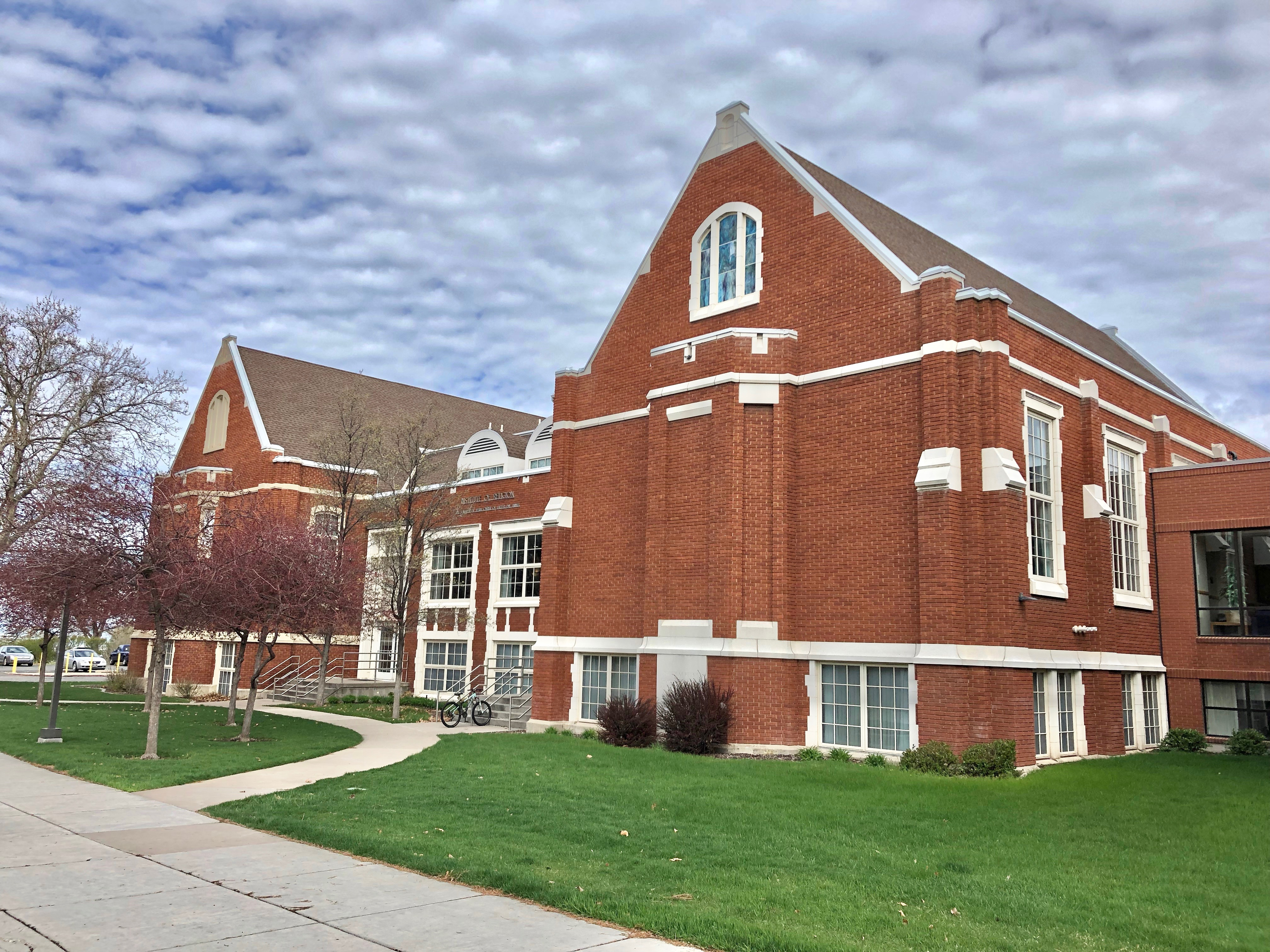
Logan Institute of Religion at Utah State University, Logan, Utah

An institute of religion is a local organization that provides religious education for young adults (ages 18–35) who are members of the Church of Jesus Christ of Latter-day Saints (LDS Church), with those of other religions also welcome to participate. Local institutes may function in church meetinghouses, but many also have a stand-alone building situated adjacent to colleges or universities (especially those found in the Mormon Corridor areas in the Western United States and Canada). Institutes of religion are managed by the Church Educational System, which also operates the church's seminary program and higher education institutions, including Brigham Young University (BYU).

In addition to offering classes, institutes often sponsor activities, such as dances, aimed at the needs of postsecondary students between eighteen and thirty-five years old. Young adult church members are encouraged, although not required, to be enrolled in an institute class whenever possible. In areas with a large LDS population, there are often special-needs institutes that serve adults who have mental or physical handicaps. These institutes adapt their curricula to meet individual student needs.

Among the standard institute course offerings are classes on the Book of Mormon, Old Testament, New Testament, the Doctrine and Covenants, and other modern revelation. Institute classes are offered on campus at LDS higher education institutions, such as BYU. However, BYU students are required to take religion classes offered by the university. Students can transfer institute course credit to BYU for a nominal charge and can graduate from the institute program after completing fourteen course credit hours.

The first institute of religion was established in 1926 in Moscow, Idaho, adjacent to the University of Idaho. Its first director was J. Wyley Sessions. The Logan Institute of Religion was the first institute opened in Utah. There are currently 450,000 students in over 2,700 locations.

== Administration ==
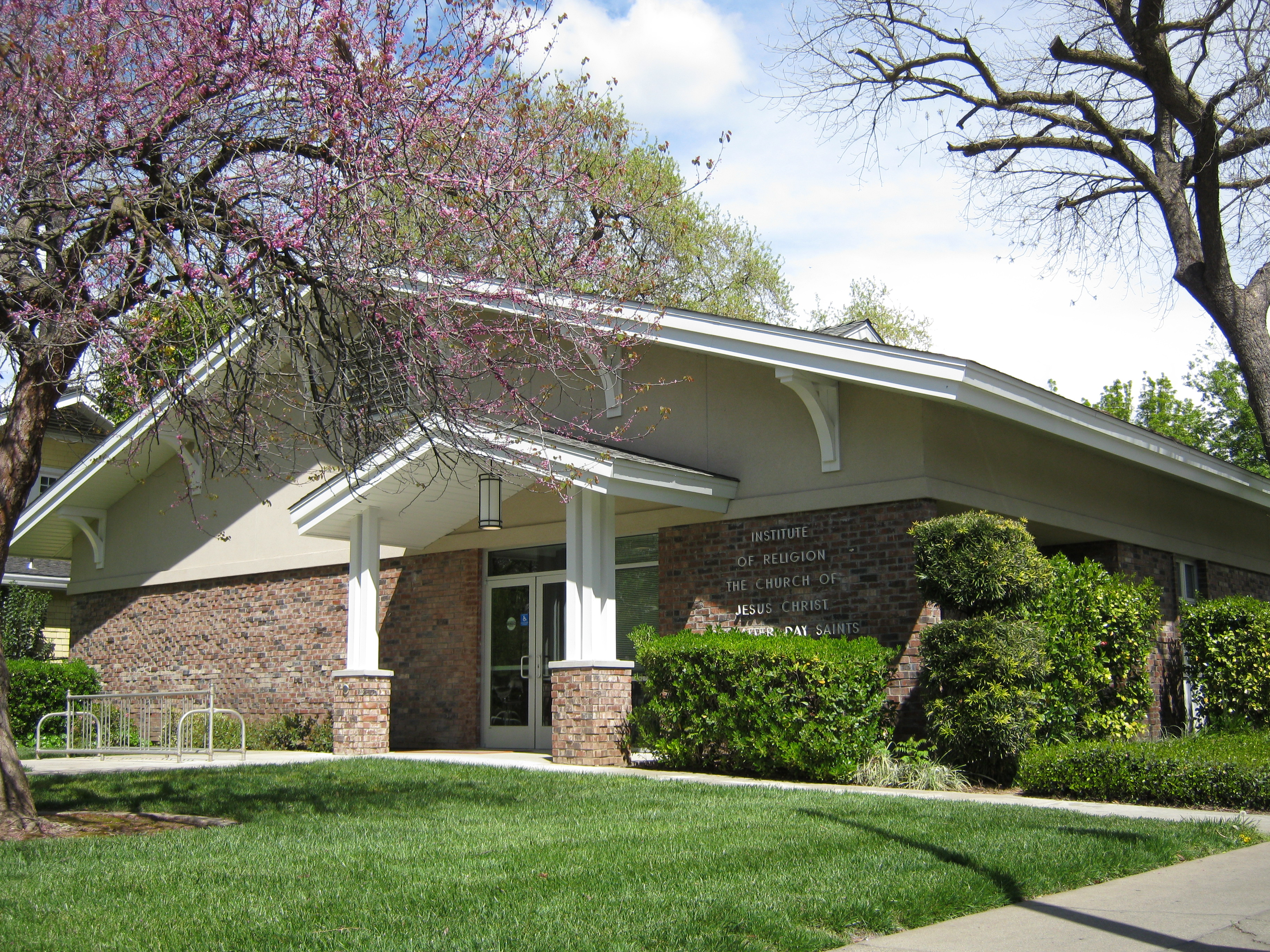
Institute of Religion at California State University, Chico.

Each institute has an institute director who is hired by Seminaries and Institutes of Religion (S&I). An institute council consists of students appointed by the local bishop or branch president. The institute council is a non-paid, voluntary position. Ultimate responsibility for the institute program falls on the Church Board of Education, which is composed of the church's First Presidency, three members of the Quorum of the Twelve Apostles, and other top leaders.

Institute directors often cover large areas. At times, institute directors may be based at a large university with many LDS students and multiple classes while teaching an institute class once a week at one or more other universities in the same general area with fewer LDS students. For example, as of fall 2009, the director of the LDS institute of religion in Ann Arbor, Michigan, taught one class a week at Eastern Michigan University and another weekly class at Wayne State University. These were each held on campus under the sponsorship of the LDS Student Association. The director also taught multiple classes at the institute building adjacent to the University of Michigan, while other classes were taught by an S&I missionary couple and part-time, volunteer instructors.

== Expanded institute ==
By the early 1990s, church leaders realized that young adults, especially young single adults, who did not attend a church college or were not currently in college at all could benefit from institute. Consequently, the church launched an expanded institute program in 1992, with the goal of having virtually every stake offer at least one institute class. These new institute classes were generally taught by volunteer instructors under CES supervision. All single members of the LDS church under the age of thirty-one were encouraged to attend institute where possible.

== Institute outreach center/center for young adults ==
Starting in the first years of the twenty-first century, and accelerating under the leadership of L. Tom Perry while he served as president of the Europe Central Area, the church developed a program called the "institute outreach center," later renamed the "center for young adults." This center focused on four aspects, including institute courses. The others included an activity council that would plan activities geared towards outreach, full-time missionaries who focused on reaching out to men and women of their own age group, and a senior missionary couple that would provide practical and spiritual guidance for the endeavor.

== See also ==
- LDS Student Association
